= List of New Brunswick by-elections =

The list of New Brunswick by-elections includes every by-election held in the Canadian province of New Brunswick. By-elections occur whenever there is a vacancy in the Legislative Assembly, although an imminent general election may allow the vacancy to remain until the dissolution of parliament. Between 1842 and 1927 incumbent members were required to recontest their seats upon being appointed to Cabinet. These Ministerial by-elections were almost always uncontested.

== 61st New Brunswick Legislature 2024–present ==
By-election	Date	Incumbent	Party	Winner	Party	Cause	Retained
Miramichi West	October 6, 2025	Michael Dawson	Progressive Conservative	Kevin Russell	Progressive Conservative	Resigned to run federally in Miramichi—Grand Lake; elected.	Yes

== 60th New Brunswick Legislature 2020–2024 ==
By-election	Date	Incumbent	Party	Winner	Party	Cause	Retained
Bathurst East-Nepisiguit-Saint-Isidore	April 24, 2023	Denis Landry	Liberal	Susan Holt	Liberal	Resigned to run for Mayor of Hautes-Terre, elected.	Yes
Restigouche-Chaleur	April 24, 2023	Daniel Guitard	Liberal	Marco LeBlanc	Liberal	Resigned to run for Mayor of Belle-Baie, elected.	Yes
Dieppe	April 24, 2023	Roger Melanson	Liberal	Richard Losier	Liberal	Resigned.	Yes
Southwest Miramichi-Bay du Vin	June 20, 2022	Jake Stewart	Progressive Conservative	Michael Dawson	Progressive Conservative	Resigned to run federally in Miramichi—Grand Lake; elected.	Yes
Miramichi Bay-Neguac	June 20, 2022	Lisa Harris	Liberal	Réjean Savoie	Progressive Conservative	Resigned to run federally in Miramichi—Grand Lake; defeated.	No

== 59th New Brunswick Legislature 2018–2020 ==
No by-elections were held during the 59th New Brunswick Legislature's term.

== 58th New Brunswick Legislature 2014–2018 ==
By-election	Date	Incumbent	Party	Winner	Party	Cause	Retained
Carleton	October 5, 2015	David Alward	Progressive Conservative	Stewart Fairgrieve	Progressive Conservative	Resignation to become Consul to Boston	Yes
Saint John East	November 17, 2014	Gary Keating	Liberal	Glen Savoie	Progressive Conservative	Resignation	No

== 57th New Brunswick Legislature 2010–2014 ==
By-election	Date	Incumbent	Party	Winner	Party	Cause	Retained
Kent	April 15, 2013	Shawn Graham	Liberal	Brian Gallant	Liberal	Resignation	Yes
Rothesay	June 25, 2012	Margaret-Ann Blaney	Progressive Conservative	Ted Flemming	Progressive Conservative	Resignation to become CEO of Efficiency New Brunswick	Yes

== 56th New Brunswick Legislature 2006–2010 ==
By-election	Date	Incumbent	Party	Winner	Party	Cause	Retained
Restigouche-La-Vallée	March 9, 2009	Percy Mockler	Progressive Conservative	Burt Paulin	Liberal	Appointed to Senate	No
New Maryland-Sunbury West	November 3, 2008	Keith Ashfield	Progressive Conservative	Jack Carr	Progressive Conservative	Resignation to contest the 2008 Federal Election	Yes
Moncton East	March 5, 2007	Bernard Lord	Progressive Conservative	Chris Collins	Liberal	Resignation	No

== 55th New Brunswick Legislature 2003–2006 ==
By-election	Date	Incumbent	Party	Winner	Party	Cause	Retained
Saint John Harbour	November 14, 2005	Elizabeth Weir	New Democratic	Ed Doherty	Liberal	Resignation	No
Shediac-Cap-Pelé	October 4, 2004	Bernard Richard	Liberal	Victor Boudreau	Liberal	Resignation to become Provincial Ombudsman	Yes

== 54th New Brunswick Legislature 1999–2003 ==
By-election	Date	Incumbent	Party	Winner	Party	Cause	Retained
Kent South	April 23, 2001	Camille Thériault	Liberal	Claude Williams	Progressive Conservative	Resignation	No
Caraquet	February 5, 2001	Bernard Thériault	Liberal	Gaston Moore	Progressive Conservative	Resignation to contest the 2000 Federal Election	No
Campbellton	February 5, 2001	Edmond Blanchard	Liberal	Jean F. Dubé	Progressive Conservative	Appointed to the Federal Court of Canada	No

== 53rd New Brunswick Legislature 1995–1999 ==
By-election	Date	Incumbent	Party	Winner	Party	Cause	Retained
Moncton East	October 19, 1998	Ray Frenette	Liberal	Bernard Lord	Progressive Conservative	Resignation	No
Kent	October 19, 1998	Alan R. Graham	Liberal	Shawn Graham	Liberal	Resignation	Yes
Fredericton South	October 19, 1998	Russell King	Liberal	Brad Green	Progressive Conservative	Resignation	No
Tantramar	November 17, 1997	Marilyn Trenholme Counsell	Liberal	Peter Mesheau	Progressive Conservative	Appointed Lieutenant Governor	No
Miramichi-Bay du Vin	November 17, 1997	Frank McKenna	Liberal	James Doyle	Liberal	Resignation	Yes
Victoria-Tobique	June 23, 1997	Larry Kennedy	Liberal	Larry Kennedy	Liberal	Void Election	Yes

== 52nd New Brunswick Legislature 1991–1995 ==
By-election	Date	Incumbent	Party	Winner	Party	Cause	Retained
Tracadie	September 26, 1994	Denis Losier	Liberal	Elvy Robichaud	Progressive Conservative	Resignation	No
Madawaska South	November 29, 1993	Pierrette Ringuette	Liberal	Percy Mockler	Progressive Conservative	Resignation to contest the 1993 Federal Election	No
Carleton North	June 28, 1993	Fred Harvey	Liberal	Dale Graham	Progressive Conservative	Resignation following conviction for election fraud	No
Moncton North	February 15, 1993	Michael McKee	Liberal	John Lebans	Liberal	Appointed a judge	Yes

== 51st New Brunswick Legislature 1987–1991 ==
By-election	Date	Incumbent	Party	Winner	Party	Cause	Retained
Tracadie	November 14, 1988	Doug Young	Liberal	Denis Losier	Liberal	Resignation to contest the 1988 Federal Election	Yes

== 50th New Brunswick Legislature 1982–1987 ==
By-election	Date	Incumbent	Party	Winner	Party	Cause	Retained
Edmundston	February 10, 1986	Jean-Maurice Simard	Progressive Conservative	Robert Beaulieu	Liberal	Appointed to the Senate	No
Riverview	April 29, 1985	Brenda Robertson	Progressive Conservative	Hubert Seamans	Liberal	Appointed to the Senate	No
Madawaska-Centre	November 26, 1984	Gérald Clavette	Liberal	Donald Marmen	Progressive Conservative	Resignation to contest the 1984 Federal Election	No
East Saint John	November 26, 1984	Gerald Merrithew	Progressive Conservative	Peter Trites	New Democratic	Resignation to contest the 1984 Federal Election	No

== 49th New Brunswick Legislature 1978–1982 ==
By-election	Date	Incumbent	Party	Winner	Party	Cause	Retained
Bay du Vin	November 5, 1979	Norbert Thériault	Liberal	Reginald MacDonald	Liberal	Appointed to the Senate	Yes

== 48th New Brunswick Legislature 1974–1978 ==
By-election	Date	Incumbent	Party	Winner	Party	Cause	Retained
Victoria-Tobique	November 29, 1976	J. Stewart Brooks	Progressive Conservative	J. Douglas Moore	Progressive Conservative	Resignation	Yes

== 47th New Brunswick Legislature 1970–1974 ==
By-election	Date	Incumbent	Party	Winner	Party	Cause	Retained
York	September 30, 1974	Harry Ames	Progressive Conservative	David Bishop	Progressive Conservative	Death	Yes
Campbellton	September 30, 1974	Charles Van Horne	Progressive Conservative	Fernand Dubé	Progressive Conservative	Resignation	Yes
Saint John Centre	June 25, 1973	George E. McInerney	Progressive Conservative	John W. Fernhill	Liberal	Death	No
Saint John East	December 11, 1972	Charles A. McIlveen	Progressive Conservative	Gerald Merrithew	Progressive Conservative	Death	Yes
Charlotte	December 11, 1972	John E. Rigby	Progressive Conservative	James N. Tucker, Jr.	Progressive Conservative	Death	Yes
Bathurst	December 11, 1972	H. H. Williamson	Liberal	Eugene McGinley	Liberal	Death	Yes
Gloucester	September 18, 1972	Bernard Jean	Liberal	Lorenzo Morais	Progressive Conservative	Resignation	No
Kent	October 1, 1971	Louis Robichaud	Liberal	Omer Léger	Progressive Conservative	Resignation	No

== 46th New Brunswick Legislature 1967–1970 ==
By-election	Date	Incumbent	Party	Winner	Party	Cause	Retained
Northumberland	June 16, 1969	J. L. A. Savoie	Liberal	Frank E. Kane	Liberal	Death	Yes
Restigouche	November 4, 1968	J.M. Joffre Daigle	Liberal	Charles Van Horne	Progressive Conservative	Death	No
Fredericton City	June 10, 1968	John F. McInerney	Progressive Conservative	Lawrence Garvie	Progressive Conservative	Death	Yes

== 45th New Brunswick Legislature 1963–1967 ==
By-election	Date	Incumbent	Party	Winner	Party	Cause	Retained
Restigouche	February 6, 1967	Georges Dumont	Liberal	Charles Van Horne	Progressive Conservative	Death	No
Saint John City	September 12, 1966	Daniel Aloysius Riley	Liberal	Stephen Weyman	Liberal	Resignation	Yes
Westmorland	September 27, 1965	Donald C. Harper	Liberal	W. Wynn Meldrum	Liberal	Death	Yes
Kent	March 16, 1964	Hugh A. Dysart	Liberal	Camille Bordage	Liberal	Death	Yes

== 44th New Brunswick Legislature 1960–1963 ==
By-election	Date	Incumbent	Party	Winner	Party	Cause	Retained
Kings	December 3, 1962	Gordon Fairweather	Progressive Conservative	John B. M. Baxter, Jr.	Progressive Conservative	Resignation to contest the 1962 Federal Election	Yes
Kings	December 3, 1962	Harry N. Jonah	Progressive Conservative	George E. Horton	Progressive Conservative	Appointed a judge	Yes
Northumberland	June 19, 1961	Paul B. Lordon	Liberal	J. Fraser Kerr	Liberal	Resignation	Yes
Carleton	June 19, 1961	Hugh John Flemming	Progressive Conservative	Richard Hatfield	Progressive Conservative	Resignation to contest a federal by-election	Yes

== 43rd New Brunswick Legislature 1956–1960 ==
no by-elections

== 42nd New Brunswick Legislature 1952–1956 ==
no by-elections

== 41st New Brunswick Legislature 1948–1952 ==
By-election	Date	Incumbent	Party	Winner	Party	Cause	Retained
Charlotte	January 9, 1950	James Joseph Hayes Doone	Liberal	William N. Campbell	Liberal	Appointed to the Senate	Yes

== 40th New Brunswick Legislature 1944–1948 ==
By-election	Date	Incumbent	Party	Winner	Party	Cause	Retained
Saint John County	July 30, 1945	Alphonso Colby Smith	Progressive Conservative	Edward Claude Seeley	Independent	Death	No
Restigouche	July 30, 1945†	Benoît Michaud	Liberal	Jean-Baptiste D'Astous	Liberal	Resignation to contest the 1945 Federal Election	Yes
Gloucester	July 30, 1945†	Clovis-Thomas Richard	Liberal	J. Michel Fournier	Liberal	Resignation to contest the 1945 Federal Election	Yes
Victoria	May 21, 1945†	Frederick William Pirie	Liberal	Michael F. McCloskey	Liberal	Appointed to the Senate	Yes

† Won by acclamation

== 39th New Brunswick Legislature 1939–1944 ==
By-election	Date	Incumbent	Party	Winner	Party	Cause	Retained
Gloucester	August 19, 1940†	Frederick T. B. Young	Liberal	Joseph E. Connolly	Liberal	Death	Yes
Kent	March 27, 1940†	Allison Dysart	Liberal	J. Killeen McKee	Liberal	Appointed a judge	Yes
Victoria	January 24, 1940	John W. Niles	Liberal	John B. McNair	Liberal	Resignation to provide a seat for McNair	Yes

† Won by acclamation

== 38th New Brunswick Legislature 1935–1939 ==
no by-elections

== 37th New Brunswick Legislature 1930–1935 ==
By-election	Date	Incumbent	Party	Winner	Party	Cause	Retained
Gloucester	October 26, 1931	John P. Lordon	Liberal	Wesley H. Coffyn	Conservative	Death	No
Saint John County	June 29, 1931	John Babington Macaulay Baxter	Conservative	Robert McAllister	Conservative	Appointed Chief Justice of New Brunswick	Yes
Westmorland	October 7, 1930†	Melville A. Oulton	Conservative	Lewis Smith	Conservative	Appointed Medical Officer of the New Brunswick Worker's Compensation Board	Yes

† Won by acclamation

== 36th New Brunswick Legislature 1925–1930 ==
By-election	Date	Incumbent	Party	Winner	Party	Cause	Retained
Albert	February 22, 1927†	John L. Peck	Conservative	Conrad J. Osman	Conservative	Death	Yes
Gloucester	December 17, 1926†	Peter Veniot	Liberal	Clovis-Thomas Richard	Liberal	Resignation to contest the 1926 Federal Election	Yes
Saint John County	December 10, 1926†	Frank L. Potts	Conservative	H. Colby Smith	Conservative	Death	Yes
St. Stephen-Milltown	December 13, 1925†	John M. Flewelling	Conservative	Arthur R. MacKenzie	Conservative	Death	Yes
Westmorland	September 26, 1925†	Antoine Joseph Léger	Conservative	Antoine Joseph Léger	Conservative	Sought re-election upon appointment as Provincial Secretary-Treasurer	Yes
Saint John County	September 26, 1925†	John Babington Macaulay Baxter	Conservative	John Babington Macaulay Baxter	Conservative	Sought re-election upon appointment as Premier and Attorney General	Yes
Restigouche	September 26, 1925†	David A. Stewart	Conservative	David A. Stewart	Conservative	Sought re-election upon appointment as Minister of Public Works	Yes
Fredericton City	September 26, 1925†	Charles Dow Richards	Conservative	Charles Dow Richards	Conservative	Sought re-election upon appointment as Minister of Lands and Mines	Yes
Charlotte	September 26, 1925†	Henry I. Taylor	Conservative	Henry I. Taylor	Conservative	Sought re-election upon appointment as Minister of Public Health	Yes
Albert	September 26, 1925†	Lewis Smith	Conservative	Lewis Smith	Conservative	Sought re-election upon appointment as Minister of Agriculture	Yes

† Won by acclamation

== 35th New Brunswick Legislature 1920–1925 ==
By-election	Date	Incumbent	Party	Winner	Party	Cause	Retained
Gloucester	February 5, 1925	James P. Byrne	Liberal	Ivan Rand	Liberal	Appointed a judge	Yes
Moncton City	December 1, 1924	Clifford William Robinson	Liberal	E. Albert Reilly	Conservative	Appointed to the Senate	No
Gloucester	February 8, 1923†	Jean George Robichaud	Liberal	J. André Doucet	Liberal	Resignation to contest a federal by-election	Yes
Kings	June 17, 1922	George Burpee Jones	Conservative	James D. McKenna	Liberal	Resignation to contest the 1921 Federal Election	No
Saint John County	June 10, 1922	John Babington Macaulay Baxter	Conservative	Allister Bentley	Liberal	Resignation to contest the 1921 Federal Election	No
Madawaska	June 3, 1922†	Donat L. Daigle	Liberal	Lorne J. Violette	Liberal	Appointed Sheriff of Madawaska	Yes
Northumberland	October 3, 1921	John Vanderbeck	Liberal	Abram V. Vanderbeck	Liberal	Death	Yes
Sunbury	December 27, 1920†	David W. Mersereau	Liberal	David W. Mersereau	Liberal	Sought re-election upon appointment as Minister of Agriculture	Yes
Queens	December 27, 1920†	Judson Hetherington	Liberal	Judson Hetherington	Liberal	Sought re-election upon appointment as Provincial Secretary-Treaurer	Yes

† Won by acclamation

== 34th New Brunswick Legislature 1917–1920 ==
By-election	Date	Incumbent	Party	Winner	Party	Cause	Retained
Saint John City	June 14, 1920†	William F. Roberts	Liberal	William F. Roberts	Liberal	Sought re-election upon the Minister of Public Health becoming a salaried office	Yes
Westmorland	April 23, 1917†	Ernest A. Smith	Liberal	Ernest A. Smith	Liberal	Sought re-election upon appointment as Minister of Lands and Mines	Yes
Victoria	April 23, 1917†	John F. Tweeddale	Liberal	John F. Tweeddale	Liberal	Sought re-election upon appointment as Minister of Agriculture	Yes
Victoria	April 23, 1917†	James Burgess	Liberal	Walter Edward Foster	Liberal	Resignation to provide a seat for Foster	Yes
Northumberland	April 23, 1917†	Robert Murray	Liberal	Robert Murray	Liberal	Sought re-election upon appointment as Provincial Secretary-Treasurer	Yes
Gloucester	April 23, 1917†	Peter Veniot	Liberal	Peter Veniot	Liberal	Sought re-election upon appointment as Minister of Public Works	Yes
Gloucester	April 23, 1917†	James P. Byrne	Liberal	James P. Byrne	Liberal	Sought re-election upon appointment as Attorney General	Yes

† Won by acclamation

== 33rd New Brunswick Legislature 1912–1917 ==
By-election	Date	Incumbent	Party	Winner	Party	Cause	Retained
Carleton	September 21, 1916	Benjamin Franklin Smith	Conservative	Benjamin Franklin Smith	Conservative	Sought re-election upon appointment as Minister of Public Works	Yes
Carleton	September 21, 1916	Donald Munro	Conservative	William S. Sutton	Conservative	Appointed Registrar of Deeds	Yes
Westmorland	May 30, 1916	Patrick G. Mahoney	Conservative	Ernest A. Smith	Liberal	Sought re-election upon appointment as Minister of Public Works	No
Carleton	January 11, 1915	James Kidd Flemming	Conservative	Benjamin Franklin Smith	Conservative	Resignation	Yes
Saint John County	December 31, 1914†	John Babington Macaulay Baxter	Conservative	John Babington Macaulay Baxter	Conservative	Sought re-election upon appointment as Attorney General	Yes
York	February 19, 1914	Harry Fulton McLeod	Conservative	Percy A. Guthrie	Conservative	Resignation to contest a federal by-election	Yes
Charlotte	February 19, 1914†	George Johnson Clarke	Conservative	George Johnson Clarke	Conservative	Sought re-election upon appointment as Attorney General	Yes
Charlotte	February 19, 1914†	W.C.H. Grimmer	Conservative	Robert Watson Grimmer	Conservative	Appointed to the Supreme Court of New Brunswick	Yes
Kings	February 5, 1914†	James Alexander Murray	Conservative	James Alexander Murray	Conservative	Sought re-election upon appointment as Minister of Agriculture	Yes

† Won by acclamation

== 32nd New Brunswick Legislature 1908–1912 ==
By-election	Date	Incumbent	Winner	Cause
Charlotte	February 10, 1912†	Thomas Aaron Hartt	Scott D. Guptill	Resignation to contest the 1911 Federal Election
Sunbury	December 7, 1911†	John Douglas Hazen	George A. Perley	Appointed to the Federal Cabinet
Saint John County	December 7, 1911	James Lowell	John Babington Macaulay Baxter	Resignation to contest the 1911 Federal Election
York	March 30, 1911	Thomas Robison	Oscar E. Morehouse	Death
Saint John County	July 20, 1909	Harrison A. McKeown	Allister F. Bentley	Appointed to the Supreme Court of New Brunswick
Northumberland	December 1, 1908	Donald Morrison	John Percival Burchill	Resignation to contest the 1908 Federal Election
Carleton	December 1, 1908	Benjamin Franklin Smith	George W. Upham	Resignation to contest the 1908 Federal Election
York	April 7, 1908†	Harry Fulton McLeod	Harry Fulton McLeod	Sought re-election upon appointment as Solicitor General
Sunbury	April 7, 1908†	John Douglas Hazen	John Douglas Hazen	Sought re-election upon appointment as Premier and Attorney General
Northumberland	April 7, 1908†	John Morrissy	John Morrissy	Sought re-election upon appointment as Chief Commissioner of Public Works
Kent	April 7, 1908†	David-Vital Landry	David-Vital Landry	Sought re-election upon appointment as Commissioner of Agriculture
Charlotte	April 7, 1908†	W.C.H. Grimmer	W.C.H. Grimmer	Sought re-election upon appointment as Surveyor General
Carleton	April 7, 1908†	James Kidd Flemming	James Kidd Flemming	Sought re-election upon appointment as Provincial Secretary

† Won by acclamation

== 31st New Brunswick Legislature 1903–1908 ==
By-election	Date	Incumbent	Winner	Cause
Saint John County	November 8, 1907†	Robert C. Ruddick	Harrison A. McKeown	Appointed Inspecting Physician at the Saint John Quarantine Station
Westmorland	April 30, 1907†	Clifford William Robinson	Clifford William Robinson	Sought re-election upon appointment as Provincial Secretary
Restigouche	January 2, 1907	Henry F. McLatchy	William Currie	Appointed a County Court Judge
Northumberland	March 11, 1905†	W. S. Loggie	Robert Murray	Resignation to contest the 1904 Federal Election
Carleton	February 15, 1905†	Wendell P. Jones	Wendell P. Jones	Sought re-election upon appointment as Solicitor General
Westmorland	December 30, 1904†	Francis J. Sweeney	Francis J. Sweeney	Sought re-election upon appointment as Solicitor General
Saint John County	December 30, 1904	Albert T. Dunn	James Lowell	Appointed Collector of the Port of Saint John
Saint John City	December 30, 1904	Harrison A. McKeown	Robert Maxwell	Resignation to contest the 1904 Federal Election
Madawaska	December 15, 1903†	Narcisse A. Gagnon	Cyprien Martin	Death
Saint John City	April 7, 1903†	Harrison A. McKeown	Harrison A. McKeown	Sought re-election upon appointment at Solicitor General

† Won by acclamation

== 30th New Brunswick Legislature 1899–1903 ==
By-election	Date	Incumbent	Winner	Cause
Kings	March 1, 1902	Albert Scott White	Ora P. King	Appointed to the Supreme Court of New Brunswick
Saint John County	January 18, 1902†	John McLeod	Robert C. Ruddick	Death
Westmorland	February 1901†	W. Woodbury Wells	Arthur Bliss Copp	Death
Carleton	February 1901†	Frank Broadstreet Carvell	Stephen Burpee Appleby	Resignation to contest the 1900 Federal Election
York	February 7, 1901†	Alexander Gibson	George W. Allen	Resignation to contest the 1900 Federal Election
Kent	January 1901†	Pierre H. Léger	Richard A. Poirier	Death
Queens	October 2, 1900	Laughlin Farris	Laughlin Farris	Sought re-election upon appointment as Commissioner of Agriculture
Albert	September 29, 1900	Henry Emmerson	Sanford S. Ryan	Resignation to contest the 1900 Federal Election
Kings	September 27, 1900	William Pugsley	William Pugsley	Sought re-election upon appointment as Attorney General
Carleton	January 1900	Charles L. Smith	James Kidd Flemming	Appointed Postmaster of Woodstock
Gloucester	December 4, 1899	Peter Veniot	John Young	Appointed Collector of Customs at Bathurst

† Won by acclamation

== 29th New Brunswick Legislature 1895–1899 ==
By-election	Date	Incumbent	Winner	Cause
Gloucester	February 28, 1898	John Sievewright	Joseph Poirier	Death
Charlotte	January 15, 1898†	James Mitchell	John Dewolfe Chipman	Death
Restigouche	June 23, 1897†	Charles H. LaBillois	Charles H. LaBillois	Sought re-election upon appointment as Commissioner of Agriculture
Westmorland	May 29, 1897†	Amasa E. Killam	Clifford William Robinson	Appointed Inspector of Railways for the Inter-Colonial Railway
Albert	January 23, 1897	William James Lewis	Charles J. Osman	Resignation to contest the 1896 Federal Election
Queens	September 14, 1896†	Andrew George Blair	Isaac W. Carpenter	Resignation to contest a federal by-election
Northumberland	July 30, 1896†	James Robinson	Allan A. Davidson	Resignation to contest a federal by-election
Saint John County	July 28, 1896†	Albert T. Dunn	Albert T. Dunn	Sought re-election upon appointment as Surveyor General

† Won by acclamation

== 28th New Brunswick Legislature 1892–1895 ==
By-election	Date	Incumbent	Winner	Cause
Carleton	January 15, 1895†	Henry A. Connell	Marcus C. Atkinson	Resignation due to election petition
Madawaska	January 7, 1895	Lévite Thériault	Cyprien Martin	Appointed Registrar of Deeds
Gloucester	November 5, 1894	Théotime Blanchard	Peter Veniot	Resignation to contest a federal by-election
Kings	February 15, 1893†	Albert Scott White	Albert Scott White	Sought re-election upon appointment as Solicitor General
Queens	November 22, 1892	Thomas Hetherington	Andrew George Blair	Resignation to provide a seat for Blair

† Won by acclamation

== 27th New Brunswick Legislature 1890–1892 ==
By-election	Date	Incumbent	Winner	Cause
Kent	September 15, 1891	Olivier J. Leblanc	Auguste Théophile Léger	Resignation to contest the 1891 Federal Election
Westmorland	February 14, 1891	H.T. Stevens	Joseph A. McQueen	Resignation to recontest over election petition
Westmorland	February 14, 1891	Henry Absalom Powell	Henry Absalom Powell	Resignation to recontest over election petition
York	October 23, 1890	Andrew George Blair	Andrew George Blair	Void Election
York	October 23, 1890	William Wilson	William Wilson	Void Election
York	October 23, 1890	John Anderson	John Anderson	Void Election
York	October 23, 1890	Richard Bellamy	Thomas Colter	Void Election
Victoria	August 23, 1890	George Thomas Baird	James Porter	Resignation to recontest over election petition
Northumberland	February 20, 1890	Lemuel John Tweedie	Lemuel John Tweedie	Sought re-election upon appointment as Surveyor General

== 26th New Brunswick Legislature 1886–1890 ==
By-election	Date	Incumbent	Winner	Cause
King's	May 25, 1889†	William Pugsley	William Pugsley	Sought re-election upon appointment as Solicitor General
Albert	February 23, 1889	Henry Emmerson	Henry Emmerson	By-election results voided
Albert	September 28, 1888	William James Lewis	Henry Emmerson	Resignation to recontest
Northumberland	December 13, 1887	William A. Park	John Morrissy	Appointed Collector of Customs for the Port of Newcastle
Kent	August 10, 1887	William Wheten	James D. Phinney	Appointed High Sheriff of Kent
Kent	August 10, 1887	Olivier J. Leblanc	Olivier J. Leblanc	Resignation to recontest over election petition
Madawaska	April 6, 1887	Lévite Thériault	Lévite Thériault	Resignation to contest the 1887 Federal Election
Northumberland	March 16, 1887	Michael Adams	John Percival Burchill	Resignation to contest the 1887 Federal Election
Saint John City	March 8, 1887†	John Valentine Ellis	Silas Alward	Resignation to contest the 1887 Federal Election

† Won by acclamation

== 25th New Brunswick Legislature 1882–1886 ==
By-election	Date	Incumbent	Winner	Cause
York	July 4, 1885	Frederick P. Thompson	William Wilson	Appointed to the Legislative Council
Kings	July 4, 1885	Edwin Arnold Vail	William Pugsley	Appointed to the Legislative Council
Restigouche	June 1885†	Joseph Cunard Barberie	William Murray	Appointed to the Legislative Council
Sunbury	January 9, 1885	Arthur Glasier	Arthur Glasier	By-election results voided
Victoria	June 28, 1884	Richard Tibbits	George Thomas Baird	Appointed Deputy Provincial Secretary
Sunbury	December 4, 1883	George A. Sterling	Arthur Glasier	Death
Westmorland	October 13, 1883	Pierre-Amand Landry	Amasa E. Killam	Resignation to contest a federal by-election
Saint John County & City	August 23, 1883	William Elder	Alfred Augustus Stockton	Death
Saint John County & City	August 23, 1883	David McLellan	David McLellan	Sought re-election upon appointment as Provincial Secretary
Charlotte	March 26, 1883†	James Mitchell	James Mitchell	Sought re-election upon appointment as Surveyor General
York	March 24, 1883	Andrew George Blair	Andrew George Blair	Sought re-election upon appointment as Premier and Attorney General
Gloucester	March 21, 1883†	Patrick G. Ryan	Patrick G. Ryan	Sought re-election upon appointment as Chief Commissioner of Public Works
Saint John County & City	March 16, 1883†	William Elder	William Elder	Sought re-election upon appointment as Provincial Secretary
Saint John County & City	March 16, 1883†	Robert J. Ritchie	Robert J. Ritchie	Sought re-election upon appointment as Solicitor General
Westmorland	January 9, 1883	Pierre-Amand Landry	Pierre-Amand Landry	Resignation to recontest over election petition
Westmorland	January 9, 1883	Charles A. Black	Charles A. Black	Resignation to recontest over election petition
Westmorland	January 9, 1883	Daniel Lionel Hanington	Daniel Lionel Hanington	Resignation to recontest over election petition
Westmorland	January 9, 1883	John A. Humphrey	John A. Humphrey	Resignation to recontest over election petition
Madawaska	October 7, 1882†	Patrick Lynott	Mathias Nadeau	Resignation due to election petition
Kings	September 27, 1882	Finnemore E. Morton	Finnemore E. Morton	Sought re-election upon appointment as Solicitor General
Kings	September 27, 1882	John Herbert Crawford	Gabriel Flewelling	Death
Kent	September 25, 1882	William Wheton	William Wheton	Resignation to recontest over election petition
Kent	September 25, 1882	Olivier J. Leblanc	Olivier J. Leblanc	Resignation to recontest over election petition

† Won by acclamation

== 24th New Brunswick Legislature 1878–1882 ==
By-election	Date	Incumbent	Winner	Cause
Sunbury	April 6, 1881	John S. Covert	James S. White	Death
Kings	May 28, 1879	John Herbert Crawford	John Herbert Crawford	Sought re-election upon appointment as Solicitor General
York	November 14, 1878	Andrew George Blair	Andrew George Blair	Resignation to recontest over election petition
York	November 14, 1878	Frederick P. Thompson	Frederick P. Thompson	Resignation to recontest over election petition
Westmorland	July 24, 1878†	Pierre-Amand Landry	Pierre-Amand Landry	Sought re-election upon appointment as Chief Commissioner of Public Works
Northumberland	July 24, 1878†	Michael Adams	Michael Adams	Sought re-election upon appointment as Surveyor General

† Won by acclamation

== 23rd New Brunswick Legislature 1874–1878 ==
By-election	Date	Incumbent	Winner	Cause
Saint John City	January 19, 1877†	Robert Marshall	Robert Marshall	By-election results voided
Saint John City	November 18, 1876	William H.A. Keans	Robert Marshall	Death
Gloucester	January 31, 1876	Théotime Blanchard	Patrick G. Ryan	Appointed Inspector of Weights and Measures for Restigouche County
Albert	January 18, 1876	Alexander Rogers	Alexander Rogers	By-election results voided
Albert	January 18, 1876	James Ryan	James Ryan	By-election results voided
Albert	August 28, 1875	Alexander Rogers	Alexander Rogers	Void Election
Albert	August 28, 1875	James Ryan	James Ryan	Void Election
Saint John County & City	March 6, 1875	Joseph Coram	William Elder	Death

† Won by acclamation

== 22nd New Brunswick Legislature 1870–1874 ==
By-election	Date	Incumbent	Winner	Cause
Kent	December 24, 1873	William Shand Caie	Henry O'Leary	Death
Carleton	November 4, 1873	George W. White	David Irvine	Resignation to contest a federal by-election
Kings	October 24, 1873	George Otty	James William Nowlan	Appointed a judge
Albert	August 16, 1873	Rufus Palmer	Martin B. Palmer	Death
Charlotte	September 20, 1872	John McAdam	John Cameron Brown	Resignation to contest the 1872 Federal Election
York	August 3, 1872†	George Luther Hathaway	John James Fraser	Death
Queens	June 21, 1872	Gideon D. Bailey	Walter S. Butler	Appointed to the Legislative Council
Westmorland	February 24(?), 1872	Joseph Lytle Moore	John A. Humphrey	Death
Westmorland	September 12, 1871	Daniel Lionel Hanington	Daniel Lionel Hanington	By-election results voided
Queens	April 4, 1871	Robert Thorne Babbit	Ebenezer Williams	Appointed Registrar of Deeds
Charlotte	March 16, 1871	Benjamin Robert Stephenson	Benjamin Robert Stephenson	Sought re-election upon appointment as Surveyor General
York	March 10, 1871†	George Luther Hathaway	George Luther Hathaway	Sought re-election upon appointment as Premier and Provincial Secretary
Westmorland	December 26, 1870	Bliss Botsford	Daniel Lionel Hanington	Appointed a judge
Restigouche	December 3, 1870	Alexander C. DesBrisay	John Phillips	Resignation to contest a federal by-election
Carleton	October 26, 1870†	William Lindsay	William Lindsay	Sought re-election upon appointment as Surveyor General

† Won by acclamation

== 21st New Brunswick Legislature 1866–1870 ==
By-election	Date	Incumbent	Winner	Cause
Northumberland	May 27, 1869	William Moore Kelly	William Moore Kelly	Sought re-election upon appointment as Chief Commissioner of Public Works
Kings	March 8, 1869†	William P. Flewelling	William P. Flewelling	Sought re-election upon appointment as Surveyor General
Northumberland	February 20, 1869†	Jacob C. Gough	Jacob C. Gough	Resignation to contest a federal by-election
Kent	February 12, 1869	Owen McInerney	Urbain Johnson	Appointed to the Legislative Council
Victoria	February 9, 1869	Benjamin Beveridge	Charles A. Hammond	Appointed to the Legislative Council
York	November 1868	John Pickard	William Hayden Needham	Resignation to contest a federal by-election
Carleton	November 14, 1868	James Hartley	George W. White	Death
Sunbury	September 22, 1868	John Glasier	John S. Covert	Appointed to the Senate
Saint John County & City	April 4, 1868†	Charles Nelson Skinner	John Waterbury Cudlip	Appointed a judge
Victoria	January 3, 1868	Vital Hébert	Lévite Thériault	Death
Gloucester	January 1–6, 1868	Robert Young	William Taylor	Appointed to the Legislative Council
Northumberland	October 22, 1867†	Richard Sutton	Richard Sutton	Sought re-election upon appointment as Surveyor General
York	October 19, 1867†	John Adolphus Beckwith	John Adolphus Beckwith	Sought re-election upon appointment as Provincial Secretary
Kings	October 19, 1867	George Ryan	Gideon McLeod	Resignation to contest the 1867 Federal Election
Saint John City	October 16, 1867	Samuel Leonard Tilley	William Keans	Resignation to contest the 1867 Federal Election
Saint John County & City	October 15, 1867	John Hamilton Gray	Joseph Coram	Resignation to contest the 1867 Federal Election
Saint John County & City	October 15, 1867	Robert Duncan Wilmot	George Edwin King	Appointed to the Senate
Westmorland	October 14, 1867†	Albert James Smith	Joseph Lytle Moore	Resignation to contest the 1867 Federal Election
Charlotte	October 10, 1867	James Watson Chandler	Henry Frye	Appointed County Court judges
Charlotte	October 10, 1867	James G. Stevens	Benjamin Robert Stephenson	Appointed County Court judges
Saint John City	October 4, 1867	Andrew Rainsford Wetmore	Andrew Rainsford Wetmore	Sought re-election upon appointment as Attorney General
York	October 2, 1867	Charles Fisher	John Pickard	Resignation to contest the 1867 Federal Election
Queens	September 23, 1867†	John Ferris	Walter S. Butler	Resignation to contest the 1867 Federal Election
Carleton	September 21, 1867	Charles Connell	James Hartley	Resignation to contest the 1867 Federal Election
Albert	September 14, 1867	Abner Reid McClelan	Charles Peck	Appointed to the Senate
Albert	September 14, 1867	John Lewis	Amos Atkinson Bliss	Appointed to the Legislative Council
Restigouche	September 11, 1867	John McMillan	William Montgomery	Resignation to contest the 1867 Federal Election
Saint John County & City	September 4, 1867†	Charles Nelson Skinner	Charles Nelson Skinner	Sought re-election upon appointment as Solicitor General
Northumberland	August 10, 1867†	John Mercer Johnson	William Moore Kelly	Resignation to contest the 1867 Federal Election
Northumberland	August 10, 1867†	Edward Williston	Jacob C. Gough	Appointed a County Court judge
Charlotte	July 1867†	John McAdam	John McAdam	Sought re-election upon appointment as Chief Commissioner of Public Works
Carleton	July 24, 1866†	Charles Connell	Charles Connell	Sought re-election upon appointment as Surveyor General

† Won by acclamation

== 20th New Brunswick Legislature 1865–1866 ==
By-election	Date	Incumbent	Winner	Cause
York	November 6, 1865	John Campbell Allen	Charles Fisher	Appointed to the Supreme Court
Westmorland	October 9, 1865†	Albert James Smith	Albert James Smith	Sought re-election upon appointment as Attorney General
Carleton	April 20, 1865†	Arthur Hill Gillmor	Arthur Hill Gillmor	Sought re-election upon appointment as Provincial Secretary
Westmorland	April 1865†	Bliss Botsford	Bliss Botsford	Sought re-election upon appointment as Surveyor General
York	April 17, 1865†	George Luther Hathaway	George Luther Hathaway	Sought re-election upon appointment as Chief Commissioner of Public Works
York	April 17, 1865†	John Campbell Allen	John Campbell Allen	Sought re-election upon appointment as Attorney General

† Won by acclamation

== 19th New Brunswick Legislature 1861–1865 ==
By-election	Date	Incumbent	Winner	Cause
Northumberland	January 13, 1865	Robinson Crocker	Richard Hutchison	Death
Charlotte	July 25, 1864	George S. Grimmer	John McAdam	Appointed Clerk of the Peace
Carleton	June 23, 1864	David Munro	Charles Connell	Appointed Registrar of Deeds
Queens	June 22, 1864	Samuel H. Gilbert	Joseph B. Perkins	Death
Saint John County & City	March 18, 1863	John Jordan	John Hamilton Gray	Death
Victoria	January 5, 1863	David B. Raymond	Benjamin Beveridge	Death
Northumberland	October 28, 1862†	John Mercer Johnson	John Mercer Johnson	Sought re-election upon appointment as Attorney General
Restigouche	August 16, 1861	John McMillan	John McMillan	Sought re-election upon appointment as Surveyor General
York	August 15, 1861	George Luther Hathaway	George Luther Hathaway	Sought re-election upon appointment as Chief Commissioner of Public Works

† Won by acclamation

== 18th New Brunswick Legislature 1857–1861 ==
By-election	Date	Incumbent	Winner	Cause
Westmorland	June 8, 1860†	James Steadman	James Steadman	Sought re-election upon appointment as Postmaster General
Carleton	November 15, 1858	Charles Connell	Charles Connell	Sought re-election upon appointment as Postmaster General
Saint John City	July 14, 1858	James A. Harding	Joseph Lawrence	Appointed Sheriff of Saint John
Westmorland	December 28, 1857	Robert K. Gilbert	Daniel Hanington	Death
Northumberland	December 26, 1857	Richard Sutton	Edward Williston	Sought re-election upon appointment as Deputy Treasurer of the port of Newcastle
Charlotte	July 1857	James Brown	James Brown	Sought re-election upon appointment as Surveyor General
Northumberland	July 22, 1857†	John Mercer Johnson	John Mercer Johnson	Sought re-election upon appointment as Postmaster General
Victoria	July 18, 1857†	Charles Watters	Charles Watters	Sought re-election upon appointment as Solicitor General
Saint John City	July 6, 1857	Samuel Leonard Tilley	Samuel Leonard Tilley	Sought re-election upon appointment as Provincial Secretary
York	June 13, 1857†	Charles Fisher	Charles Fisher	Sought re-election upon appointment as Premier and Attorney General

† Won by acclamation

== 17th New Brunswick Legislature 1856–1857 ==
By-election	Date	Incumbent	Winner	Cause
York	September 1856†	Charles Macpherson	Charles Macpherson	Sought re-election upon appointment as Provincial Secretary
Restigouche	August 20, 1856†	John Montgomery	John Montgomery	Sought re-election upon appointment as Surveyor General

† Won by acclamation

== 16th New Brunswick Legislature 1854–1856 ==
By-election	Date	Incumbent	Winner	Cause
York	February 28, 1856	James Taylor	John Campbell Allen	Death
Saint John County & City	September 22, 1855	John Richard Partelow	John F. Godard	Appointed Auditor General
Saint John County & City	September 22, 1855	William Johnstone Ritchie	R. Sands Armstrong	Appointed to the Supreme Court
Victoria	September 10, 1855	Francis Rice	Charles Watters	Appointed to the Legislative Council
Charlotte	December 1854	James Brown	James Brown	Sought re-election upon appointment as Surveyor General
Saint John City	November 15, 1854†	Samuel Leonard Tilley	Samuel Leonard Tilley	Sought re-election upon appointment as Provincial Secretary
Northumberland	November 14, 1854†	John Mercer Johnson	John Mercer Johnson	Sought re-election upon appointment as Solicitor General
York	November 12, 1854†	Charles Fisher	Charles Fisher	Sought re-election upon appointment as Premier and Attorney General

† Won by acclamation

== 15th New Brunswick Legislature 1850–1854 ==
By-election	Date	Incumbent	Winner	Cause
Westmorland	May 1853	William Crane	Amand Landry	Death
Carleton	April 18, 1853	Horace H. Beardsley	Charles Connell	Death
Saint John County & City	July 19, 1852	John Johnston	John Jordan	Appointed Police Magistrate for Saint John
Northumberland	July 6, 1852	Alexander Rankin	George Kerr	Death
Westmorland	May 18, 1852	Robert B. Chapman	Albert James Smith	Void Election
Albert	January 1852	William Steeves	John Lewis	Appointed to the Legislative Council
Queens	January 1852	Thomas Gilbert	Samuel H. Gilbert	Appointed to the Legislative Council
Restigouche	November or December 1851	Andrew Barberie	Andrew Barberie	Sought re-election upon appointment as Clerk of the Crown in the Supreme Court
Saint John City	November 15, 1851	Samuel Leonard Tilley	James A. Harding	Resignation
Saint John County & City	November 14, 1851	Charles Simonds	John F. Goddard	Resignation
Saint John County & City	November 11, 1851†	William Johnstone Ritchie	John Johnston	Resignation
Saint John County & City	October 18, 1851	Robert Duncan Wilmot	Robert Duncan Wilmot	Sought re-election upon appointment as Surveyor-General
Gloucester	September 29, 1851	Joseph Read	Joseph Read	Sought re-election upon appointment as Deputy Treasurer of Gloucester
Carleton	February 1851	Charles Connell	Richard English	Appointed to the Legislative Council
York	February 1851	Lemuel Allan Wilmot	Charles McPherson	Appointed a judge
Northumberland	February 16, 1851†	John Ambrose Street	John Ambrose Street	Sought re-election upon appointment as Attorney General

† Won by acclamation

== 14th New Brunswick Legislature 1846–1850 ==
By-election	Date	Incumbent	Winner	Cause
Saint John City	March 6, 1849	Robert Leonard Hazen	Barzilla Ansley	Appointed to the Legislative Council
Queens	March 1847	Hugh Johnston	John Earle	Void Election

== 13th New Brunswick Legislature 1843–1846 ==
By-election	Date	Incumbent	Winner	Cause
Kings	May 1844	Samuel Freeze	William McLeod	Death
Northumberland	July 1843	John T. Williston	John Ambrose Street	Void Election
York	June 1843†	Lemuel Allan Wilmot	Lemuel Allan Wilmot	Sought re-election upon appointment to the Executive Council
Saint John City	June 7, 1843†	Robert Leonard Hazen	Robert Leonard Hazen	Sought re-election upon appointment to the Executive Council

† Won by acclamation

== 12th New Brunswick Legislature 1837–1842 ==
By-election	Date	Incumbent	Winner	Cause
Charlotte	November 1839	Thomas Wyer	James Boyd	Appointed to the Legislative Council
Restigouche	November 5, 1838†	New Seat	Andrew Barberie	Restigouche County created

† Won by acclamation

== 11th New Brunswick Legislature 1835–1837 ==
By-election	Date	Incumbent	Winner	Cause
York	January 1837	Jedediah Slason	D. L. Robinson	Death
Westmorland	November–December 1836	Edward Barron Chandler	William Wilson	Appointed to Legislative Council

== 10th New Brunswick Legislature 1830–1834 ==
By-election	Date	Incumbent	Winner	Cause
York	June 16, 1834†	William Taylor	Lemuel Allan Wilmot	Death
Northumberland	February 28, 1833†	Joseph Cunard	John Ambrose Street	Appointed to Legislative Council
York	September 1832	John Dow	Jeremiah Connell	Death
York	September 1832	Jeremiah Connell	James Taylor	By-election results reversed March 1833

† Won by acclamation

== 9th New Brunswick Legislature 1827–1830 ==
By-election	Date	Incumbent	Winner	Cause
Northumberland	December 28, 1828	Richard Simonds	Joseph Cunard	Appointed Provincial Treasurer
Queens	August 14–27, 1828	Harry Peters	Thomas Gilbert	Appointed to the Council

== 8th New Brunswick Legislature 1820–1827 ==
By-election	Date	Incumbent	Winner	Cause
Saint John County & City	February 2, 1826†	Ward Chipman	Robert Parker	Appointed a judge and to the Council
Westmorland	April 27, 1825	Benjamin Wilson	Robert Scott	Death
Sunbury	March 1824	William Wilmot	Samuel Nevers	Unseated for being a member of the clergy
Westmorland	March 2, 1824	William Botsford	William Crane	Appointed a judge and to the Council
Sunbury	May 1823	William Wilmot	William Wilmot	Unseated for being a member of the clergy
Sunbury	March 1823	Amos Perley	William Wilmot	Death
Westmorland	March 19, 1822	Joseph Crandall	Malcolm Wilmot	Unseated for being a member of the clergy
York	March 1, 1822	Stair Agnew	Jedediah Slason	Death

† Won by acclamation

== 7th New Brunswick Legislature 1819–1820 ==
no by-elections

== 6th New Brunswick Legislature 1816–1819 ==
By-election	Date	Incumbent	Winner	Cause
Saint John City	May 12, 1818	Stephen Humbert	Stephen Humbert	Expulsion for writing a newspaper editorial criticizing another member of the House.
Queens	August 10, 1817	Richard Yeamans	Richard Yeamans	Void Election

== 5th New Brunswick Legislature 1809–1816 ==
By-election	Date	Incumbent	Winner	Cause
York	January 26, 1814	Duncan McLeod	John Murray Bliss	Death
Westmorland	February 24, 1813†	Amos Botsford	William Botsford	Death
Saint John City	November 7, 1810	John Garrison	John Robinson	Death
Kings	March 1810	John Coffin	Jasper Belding	Void Election
Kings	March 1810	George Pitfield	George Leonard	Void Election

† Won by acclamation

== 4th New Brunswick Legislature 1802–1809 ==
By-election	Date	Incumbent	Winner	Cause
Saint John County & City	November 9, 1803	Edward Sands	Munson Jarvis	Void Election
Westmorland	November 1803	Hugh McMonagle	Titus Knapp	Death

== 3rd New Brunswick Legislature 1795–1802 ==
By-election	Date	Incumbent	Winner	Cause
Kings	May 1, 1801	David Fanning	George Leonard	Expulsion following conviction for rape.
Charlotte	April 1799	David Owen	Ninian Lindsay	Did not take seat

== 2nd New Brunswick Legislature 1793–1795 ==
no by-elections held

== 1st New Brunswick Legislature 1785–1792 ==
By-election	Date	Incumbent	Winner	Cause
Kings	March 2–12, 1791	John Hamilton	David Fanning	Left the Province
York	February 25–26, 1791	Edward Stelle	John Saunders	Left the Province
Northumberland	March 1791	William Davidson	Harris William Hailes	Death
Saint John County & City	November 24-December 1, 1789	Stanton Hazard	Nehemiah Rogers	Death
Sunbury	November 9, 1789	Richard Vandeburg	James Glenie	Left the Province
Charlotte	November 1789	William Paine	Colin Campbell	Left the Province
Kings	September 1788	Ebenezer Foster	John Hamilton	Death

== See also ==
- List of federal by-elections in Canada
