= 24th New Brunswick Legislature =

The 24th New Brunswick Legislative Assembly represented New Brunswick between February 22, 1879, and May 25, 1882.

Edward Barron Chandler served as Lieutenant-Governor of New Brunswick until February 1880, when he was replaced by Robert Duncan Wilmot.

Benjamin Robert Stephenson was chosen as speaker.

The Conservative Party led by John James Fraser formed the government. Daniel L. Hanington replaced Fraser as leader in 1882.

== Members ==
| Electoral District | Name | Party | First elected / previously elected |
|---|---|---|---|
| Albert | W.J. Lewis | Independent | 1878 |
| Albert | Gaius S. Turner | Conservative | 1878 |
| Carleton | George W. White | Conservative | 1868, 1878 |
| Carleton | John S. Leighton | Liberal | 1874 |
| Charlotte | George F. Hill | Liberal | 1878 |
| Charlotte | Benjamin Robert Stephenson | Liberal | 1867 |
| Charlotte | Thomas Cottrell | Liberal | 1874 |
| Charlotte | James E. Lynott | Independent | 1878 |
| Gloucester | Patrick G. Ryan | Liberal | 1876 |
| Gloucester | Francis J. McManus | Liberal | 1878 |
| Kent | Urbain Johnson | Liberal | 1869, 1874 |
| Kent | Charles J. Sayre | Independent | 1878 |
| Kings | J. H. Crawford | Liberal | 1870 |
| Kings | Finnemore E. Morton | Independent | 1878 |
| Kings | E.A. Vail | Independent | 1856, 1870, 1878 |
| Madawaska | Lévite Thériault | Liberal | 1868 |
| Northumberland | M. Adams | Conservative | 1870, 1878 |
| Northumberland | Ernest Hutchinson | Independent | 1878 |
| Northumberland | Thomas F. Gillespie | Conservative | 1870, 1878 |
| Northumberland | Allan A. Davidson | Conservative | 1874 |
| Queens | Walter S. Butler | Independent | 1867, 1872 |
| Queens | Francis Woods | Liberal | 1874 |
| Restigouche | J.C. Barberie | Liberal | 1878 |
| Restigouche | Thomas F. Kenny | Conservative | 1878 |
| Saint John City | William Wedderburn | Independent | 1870 |
| Saint John City | Robert Marshall | Liberal | 1876 |
| Saint John County | David McLellan | Liberal | 1878 |
| Saint John County | William Elder | Liberal | 1875 |
| Saint John County | Robert J. Ritchie | Liberal | 1878 |
| Saint John County | Edward Willis | Independent | 1870 |
| Sunbury | William E. Perley | Conservative | 1856, 1874 |
| Sunbury | John S. Covert (Note: died in 1881) | Liberal | 1868 |
| Sunbury | James S. White (1881) | Conservative | 1881 |
| Victoria | William B. Beveridge | Conservative | 1874 |
| Westmorland | A.E. Killam | Conservative | 1878 |
| Westmorland | P.A. Landry | Conservative | 1870, 1878 |
| Westmorland | D.L. Hanington | Conservative | 1870, 1878 |
| Westmorland | J.L. Black | Independent | 1878 |
| York | A.G. Blair | Liberal | 1878 |
| York | Frederick P. Thompson | Liberal | 1878 |
| York | John J. Fraser | Conservative | 1865, 1872 |
| York | George J. Colter | Conservative | 1878 |

== Notes ==
| Preceded by 23rd New Brunswick Legislature | Legislative Assemblies of New Brunswick; 1879–1882 | Succeeded by 25th New Brunswick Legislature |
