= 25th New Brunswick Legislature =

The 25th New Brunswick Legislative Assembly represented New Brunswick between February 22, 1883, and April 2, 1886.

Robert Duncan Wilmot served as Lieutenant-Governor of New Brunswick until November 1885, when he was replaced by Samuel Leonard Tilley.

James E. Lynott was chosen as speaker.

In March 1883, the Conservatives led by Daniel L. Hanington lost a confidence motion and the Liberal Party led by Andrew G. Blair formed the new government.

== Members ==
Electoral District	Name	Party	First elected / previously elected
Albert	W.J. Lewis	Independent	1878
Albert	Gains S. Turner	Conservative	1878
Carleton	George W. White	Conservative	1868, 1878
Carleton	John S. Leighton	Liberal	1874
Charlotte	John McAdam	Conservative	1854, 1864, 1866, 1882
Charlotte	James E. Lynott	Independent	1878
Charlotte	James Mitchell	Liberal	1882
Charlotte	George F. Hibbard	Independent	1882
Gloucester	Francis J. McManus	Liberal	1878
Gloucester	Patrick G. Ryan	Liberal	1876
Kent	William Wheton	Independent	1882
Kent	Olivier J. Leblanc	Liberal	1882
Kings	Finnemore E. Morton	Independent	1878
Kings	J. H. Crawford (Note: died in 1882)	Liberal	1870
Kings	E.A. Vail (Note: died in 1885)	Independent	1856, 1870, 1878
Kings	Gabriel H. Flewelling (1882)	Conservative	1882
Kings	William Pugsley (1885)	Liberal	1885
Madawaska	P. Lynott (Note: resigned)	Independent	1882
Madawaska	Mathias Nadeau (1882)	Conservative	1882
Northumberland	Michael Adams	Conservative	1870, 1878
Northumberland	William A. Park	Conservative	1882
Northumberland	Thomas F. Gillespie	Conservative	1870, 1878
Northumberland	John P. Burchill	Liberal	1882
Queens	Thomas Hetherington	Liberal	1882
Queens	Albert Palmer	Liberal	1882
Restigouche	J.C. Barberie (Note: named to Legislative Council)	Liberal	1878
Restigouche	Charles H. LaBillois	Conservative	1882
Restigouche	William Murray (1885)	Conservative	1885
Saint John City	John V. Ellis	Liberal	1882
Saint John City	Ezekiel McLeod	Conservative	1882
Saint John County	David McLellan	Liberal	1878
Saint John County	William Elder (Note: died in 1883)	Liberal	1875
Saint John County	Robert J. Ritchie	Liberal	1878
Saint John County	William A. Quinton	Liberal	1882
Saint John County	Alfred Augustus Stockton (1883)	Conservative	1883
Sunbury	William E. Perley	Conservative	1856, 1874
Sunbury	George A. Sterling	Liberal	1882
Sunbury	Arthur Glasier (1883)	Liberal	1883
Victoria	Richard W.L. Tibbits	Conservative	1882
Victoria	George Thomas Baird (1884)	Conservative	1884
Westmorland	P.A. Landry	Conservative	1870, 1878
Westmorland	Charles A. Black	Conservative	1882
Westmorland	D.L. Hanington	Conservative	1870, 1878
Westmorland	John A. Humphrey	Conservative	1872, 1882
Westmorland	A.E. Killam (1882)	Conservative	1878, 1882
York	George J. Colter	Conservative	1878
York	Edward L. Wetmore	Liberal	1882
York	A.G. Blair	Liberal	1878
York	Frederick P. Thompson	Liberal	1878
York	William Wilson (1885)	Liberal	1885

== Notes ==
Preceded by 24th New Brunswick Legislature	Legislative Assemblies of New Brunswick; 1883–1886	Succeeded by 26th New Brunswick Legislature
