= 18th New Brunswick Legislature =

The 18th New Brunswick Legislative Assembly represented New Brunswick between June 24, 1857, and May 14, 1861.

The assembly sat at the pleasure of the Governor of New Brunswick John Henry Thomas Manners-Sutton.

James A. Harding was chosen as speaker for the house. In 1859, John M. Johnson was chosen as speaker after Harding resigned his seat.

== List of members ==
Electoral District	Name	First elected / previously elected
Albert	Abner R. McClelan	1854
Albert	John Lewis	1856
Carleton	Charles Connell	1846
Carleton	Charles Perley	1843, 1856
Charlotte	Arthur Hill Gillmor	1854
Charlotte	John McAdam	1854
Charlotte	James Brown	1857
Charlotte	James Watson Chandler	1857
Gloucester	Joseph Read	1846, 1856
Gloucester	William End	1830, 1854
Kent	Francis McPhelim	1850
Kent	Lestock P. W. DesBrisay	1856
Kings	Edwin A. Vail	1857
Kings	Walter B. Scovil	1856
Kings	Matthew McLeod	1850, 1857
Northumberland	Richard Sutton	1854
Northumberland	George Kerr	1852
Northumberland	Peter Mitchell	1852, 1856
Northumberland	John M. Johnson	1850
Queens	Samuel H. Gilbert	1852, 1857
Queens	John Ferris	1854
Restigouche	John McMillan	1857
Restigouche	John Montgomery	1846
Saint John City	Samuel Leonard Tilley	1850, 1854, 1857
Saint John City	James A. Harding	1851
Saint John City	Joseph Lawrence (1858)	1858
Saint John County	Richard Wright	1857
Saint John County	John W. Cudlip	1857
Saint John County	Robert D. Wilmot	1846
Saint John County	John H. Gray	1850
Sunbury	William E. Perley	1856
Sunbury	David Tapley	1856
Victoria	James Tibbits	1854
Victoria	Charles Watters	1855
Westmorland	Albert J. Smith	1854
Westmorland	James Steadman	1854, 1857
Westmorland	Robert K. Gilbert	1856
Westmorland	Bliss Botsford	1850, 1856
Westmorland	Daniel Hanington (1857)	1834, 1857
York	Charles Macpherson	1851
York	John McIntosh	1857
York	John C. Allen	1856
York	Charles Fisher	1854

Preceded by 17th New Brunswick Legislature	Legislative Assemblies of New Brunswick; 1857–1861	Succeeded by 19th New Brunswick Legislature
