= 16th New Brunswick Legislature =

The 16th New Brunswick Legislative Assembly represented New Brunswick between October 19, 1854, and May 30, 1856.

The assembly sat at the pleasure of the Governor of New Brunswick John Henry Thomas Manners-Sutton.

Daniel Hanington was chosen as speaker for the house.

== List of members ==
Electoral District	Name	First elected / previously elected
Albert	Edward Stevens	1854
Albert	Abner R. McClelan	1854
Carleton	Charles Connell	1846
Carleton	Richard English	1851
Charlotte	Arthur Hill Gillmor	1854
Charlotte	John McAdam	1854
Charlotte	James Boyd	1854
Charlotte	James Brown	1854
Gloucester	William End	1830, 1854
Gloucester	Patrick McNaughton	1854
Kent	Robert Barry Cutler	1850
Kent	Francis McPhelim	1850
Kings	Matthew McLeod	1850
Kings	George Ryan	1850
Kings	Henry W. Purdy	1850
Northumberland	John A. Street	1833, 1843
Northumberland	George Kerr	1852
Northumberland	John M. Johnson, Jr.	1850
Northumberland	Richard Sutton	1854
Queens	Samuel H. Gilbert	1852
Queens	John Ferris	1854
Restigouche	John Montgomery	1846
Restigouche	Chipman Botsford	1854
Saint John City	James A. Harding	1851
Saint John City	Samuel Leonard Tilley	1850, 1854
Saint John County	John R. Partelow (Note: named Auditor General in 1855)	1827
Saint John County	Robert Duncan Wilmot	1846
Saint John County	John Hamilton Gray	1850
Saint John County	William J. Ritchie	1846
Saint John County	John F. Godard (1855)	1850, 1855
Saint John County	R. Sands Armstrong (1855)	1855
Sunbury	George Hayward	1827, 1846
Sunbury	Enoch Lunt	1854
Victoria	Francis Rice	1850
Victoria	James Tibbits	1854
Victoria	Charles Watters (1855)	1855
Westmorland	Daniel Hanington	1834
Westmorland	Albert J. Smith	1854
Westmorland	Amand Landry	1846, 1853
Westmorland	James Steadman	1854
York	Charles Fisher	1854
York	Charles McPherson	1851
York	James Taylor	1833
York	George L. Hatheway	1850
York	John Campbell Allen (1856)	1856

== Notes ==
Preceded by 15th New Brunswick Legislature	Legislative Assemblies of New Brunswick; 1854–1856	Succeeded by 17th New Brunswick Legislature
