= 20th New Brunswick Legislature =

The 20th New Brunswick Legislative Assembly represented New Brunswick between April 27, 1865, and May 9, 1866.

The assembly sat at the pleasure of the Governor of New Brunswick Arthur Charles Hamilton-Gordon. Edwin Arnold Vail was chosen as speaker.

The anti-Confederation Party led by Albert James Smith formed the government.

In April 1866, the non-elected Legislative Council passed a reply to the throne speech supporting confederation, which was accepted by Governor Gordon. Smith and his administration resigned in protest of what they believed to be a violation of the fundamentals of responsible government. The assembly was dissolved and an election was called.

== Members ==
Electoral District	Name	First elected / previously elected
Albert	Abner R. McClelan	1854
Albert	John Lewis	1856, 1865
Carleton	William Lindsay	1861
Carleton	Charles Connell	1846, 1864
Charlotte	George F. Hill	1865
Charlotte	James Boyd	1854, 1861
Charlotte	Arthur Hill Gillmor	1854
Charlotte	Robert Thomson	1865
Gloucester	John Meahan	1861
Gloucester	Robert Young	1861
Kent	William S. Caie	1865
Kent	Lestock P. W. DesBrisay	1856
Kings	Edwin A. Vail	1857
Kings	Walter B. Scovil	1856
Kings	George Otty	1865
Northumberland	Edward Williston	1861
Northumberland	Richard Hutchison	1865
Northumberland	George Kerr	1852
Northumberland	Richard Sutton	1854, 1865
Queens	Joseph B. Perkins	1865
Queens	Gideon D. Bailey	1865
Restigouche	John McMillan	1857
Restigouche	Alexander C. DesBrisay	1865
Saint John City	Andrew R. Wetmore	1865
Saint John City	Jacob V. Troop	1865
Saint John County	John W. Cudlip	1857
Saint John County	Robert D. Wilmot	1850, 1865
Saint John County	Joseph Coram	1865
Saint John County	Timothy W. Anglin	1861
Sunbury	John Glasier	1861
Sunbury	William E. Perley	1856
Victoria	John Costigan	1861
Victoria	Benjamin Beveridge	1863
Westmorland	Albert J. Smith	1854
Westmorland	Amand Landry	1846, 1853, 1861
Westmorland	Bliss Botsford	1850, 1856, 1865
Westmorland	William J. Gilbert	1861
York	John C. Allen	1856
York	George L. Hatheway	1850, 1861
York	John J. Fraser	1865
York	William H. Needham	1850, (Note: Saint John City) 1865
York	Charles Fisher (1865)	1854, 1865

== Notes ==
Preceded by 19th New Brunswick Legislature	Legislative Assemblies of New Brunswick; 1865–1866	Succeeded by 21st New Brunswick Legislature
