= 15th New Brunswick Legislature =

The 15th New Brunswick Legislative Assembly represented New Brunswick between February 6, 1851, and May 19, 1854.

The assembly sat at the pleasure of the Governor of New Brunswick Edmund Walker Head.

Charles Simonds was chosen as speaker for the house. After Simonds resigned his seat, William Crane served as speaker from January 1852 to March 1853 when he resigned due to poor health. Daniel Hanington was chosen to replace Crane as speaker.

== List of members ==
Electoral District	Name	First elected / previously elected
Albert	William H. Steeves	1846
Albert	Reuben Stiles	1850
Albert	John Lewis (1852)	1852
Carleton	Charles Connell	1846
Carleton	Horace H. Beardsley	1850
Carleton	Richard English (1851)	1851
Charlotte	John James Robinson	1850
Charlotte	Robert Thomson	1837
Charlotte	William Porter	1846
Charlotte	Bartholomew R. Fitzgerald	1850
Gloucester	Robert Gordon	1850
Gloucester	Joseph Read	1846
Kent	Robert B. Cutler	1850
Kent	Francis McPhelim	1850
Kings	Matthew McLeod	1850
Kings	George Ryan	1850
Kings	Henry W. Purdy	1850
Northumberland	Alexander Rankin (Note: died in 1852)	1827
Northumberland	John A. Street	1833, 1843
Northumberland	John M. Johnson	1850
Northumberland	John T. Williston	1850
Northumberland	Peter Mitchell (1852)	1852
Northumberland	George Kerr (1852)	1852
Queens	John Earle	1847
Queens	Thomas Gilbert	1828
Queens	Samuel H. Gilbert (1852)	1852
Restigouche	John Montgomery	1846
Restigouche	Andrew Barberie	1838
Saint John City	Samuel Leonard Tilley (Note: resigned seat in 1851)	1850
Saint John City	William H. Needham	1850
Saint John City	James A. Harding (1851)	1851
Saint John County	Robert D. Wilmot	1846
Saint John County	William J. Ritchie	1846
Saint John County	John H. Gray	1850
Saint John County	Charles Simonds	1820, 1850
Saint John County	John F. Goddard (1851)	1851
Saint John County	John Johnson (1851)	1851
Sunbury	George Hayward	1827, 1846
Sunbury	William Scoullar	1850
Victoria	John R. Partelow	1827
Victoria	Francis Rice	1850
Westmorland	William Crane (Note: died in 1853)	1850
Westmorland	Daniel Hanington	1834
Westmorland	Bliss Botsford	1850
Westmorland	Robert B. Chapman	1850
Westmorland	Amand Landry (1853)	1846, 1853
York	James Taylor	1833
York	George L. Hatheway	1850
York	Thomas Pickard, Jr.	1850
York	Lemuel A. Wilmot	1834
York	Charles McPherson (1851)	1851

== Notes ==
Preceded by 14th New Brunswick Legislature	Legislative Assemblies of New Brunswick; 1851–1854	Succeeded by 16th New Brunswick Legislature
