= 30th New Brunswick Legislature =

The 30th New Brunswick Legislative Assembly represented New Brunswick between March 23, 1899, and February 5, 1903.

Abner Reid McClelan served as Lieutenant-Governor of New Brunswick until January 1902 when he was succeeded by Jabez Bunting Snowball.

C.W. Robinson was chosen as speaker.

The Liberal Party led by Henry Emmerson formed the government. Lemuel John Tweedie became party leader in 1907 when Emmerson entered federal politics.

== Members ==
Electoral District	Name	Party	First elected / previously elected
Albert	Henry Emmerson	Liberal	1888, 1892
Albert	Charles J. Osman	Liberal	1897
Albert	Sanford S. Ryan (1900)	Independent	1900
Carleton	Charles L. Smith	Liberal	1895
Carleton	Hugh H. McCain	Liberal	1895
Carleton	Frank B. Carvell	Liberal	1899
Carleton	James K. Fleming (1900)	Conservative	1900
Carleton	Stephen B. Appleby (1900)	Liberal	1900
Charlotte	William Frederick Todd	Liberal	1899
Charlotte	George F. Hill	Liberal	1878, 1892
Charlotte	James Russell	Liberal	1886
Charlotte	James O'Brien	Liberal	1892
Gloucester	Peter J. Veniot	Liberal	1894
Gloucester	Theobald M. Burns	Conservative	1899
Gloucester	Joseph Poirier	Conservative	1890, 1898
Gloucester	John Young (1899)	Independent	1899
Kent	Pierre H. Léger	Conservative	1895
Kent	James Barnes	Liberal	1895
Kent	Urbain Johnson	Liberal	1869, 1874, 1895
Kent	Richard A. Poirier (1901)	Independent	1901
Kings	George G. Scovil	Liberal	1892
Kings	Albert S. White	Liberal	1886
Kings	William Pugsley	Liberal	1885, 1899
Kings	Ora P. King (1902)	Independent	1902
Madawaska	Frederick LaForest	Liberal	1899
Madawaska	Narcisse A. Gagnon	Independent	1899
Northumberland	John P. Burchill	Liberal	1882, 1887
Northumberland	John O'Brien	Conservative	1890
Northumberland	Lemuel J. Tweedie	Liberal	1874, 1886
Northumberland	Charles E. Fish	Conservative	1899
Queens	Isaac W. Carpenter	Independent	1896
Queens	Laughlin P. Farris	Liberal	1892
Restigouche	William A. Mott	Conservative	1892
Restigouche	Charles H. LaBillois	Conservative	1892
Saint John City	George Robertson	Independent	1899
Saint John City	Harrison A. McKeown	Conservative	1890, 1899
Saint John City	Daniel S. Purdy	Independent	1899
Saint John City	William Shaw	Conservative	1890
Saint John County	Albert T. Dunn	Liberal	1892
Saint John County	John McLeod	Liberal	1892
Saint John County	Robert C. Ruddick (1902)	Independent	1902
Sunbury	Parker Glasier	Conservative	1899
Sunbury	John D. Hazen	Conservative	1899
Victoria	James E. Porter	Liberal	1890, 1895
Victoria	Thomas Lawson	Independent	1899
Westmorland	William F. Humphrey	Independent	1899
Westmorland	Clifford W. Robinson	Liberal	1897
Westmorland	Olivier-Maximin Melanson	Conservative	1890, 1899
Westmorland	W. Woodbury Wells	Liberal	1892
Westmorland	Arthur B. Copp (1901)	Liberal	1901
York	William T. Whitehead	Independent	1899
York	John A. Campbell	Independent	1899
York	Alexander Gibson	Liberal	1899
York	Frederick P. Thompson	Liberal	1878, 1898
York	George W. Allen (1901)	Independent	1901

Preceded by 29th New Brunswick Legislature	Legislative Assemblies of New Brunswick; 1899–1903	Succeeded by 31st New Brunswick Legislature
