= 14th New Brunswick Legislature =

The 14th New Brunswick Legislative Assembly represented New Brunswick between January 28, 1847, and May 31, 1850.

The assembly sat at the pleasure of the Governor of New Brunswick William MacBean George Colebrooke. Edmund Walker Head became governor in April 1848.

In May 1848, the governor formed what has been described as the first "responsible government" in the province, bringing more balanced representation of the members of the assembly into the Executive Council and giving more decision-making power to the council.

John Wesley Weldon was chosen as speaker for the house.

== List of members ==
Electoral District	Name	First elected / previously elected
Albert	William H. Steeves	1846
Albert	John Smith	1846
Carleton	Charles Connell	1846
Carleton	James Tibbits	1846
Charlotte	James Brown	1830
Charlotte	Robert Thomson	1837
Charlotte	William Porter	1846
Charlotte	James Boyd	1839
Gloucester	William End	1830
Gloucester	Joseph Read	1846
Kent	John Wesley Weldon	1827
Kent	David Wark	1843
Kings	Sylvester Z. Earle	1843
Kings	William McLeod	1844
Kings	John C. Vail	1820, 1830, 1846
Northumberland	Alexander Rankin	1827
Northumberland	John A. Street	1833, 1843
Northumberland	William Carman	1846
Northumberland	Martin Cranney	1846
Queens	Hugh Johnston, Jr.	1837, 1846
Queens	Thomas Gilbert	1828
Queens	John Earle (1847)	1847
Restigouche	John Montgomery	1846
Restigouche	Andrew Barberie	1838
Saint John City	Robert L. Hazen	1843
Saint John City	Isaac Woodward	1846
Saint John City	Barzilla Ansley (1849)	1849
Saint John County	John Jordan	1837
Saint John County	John R. Partelow	1827
Saint John County	William J. Ritchie	1846
Saint John County	Robert D. Wilmot	1846
Sunbury	George Hayward	1827, 1846
Sunbury	Thomas O. Miles	1846
Westmorland	Daniel Hanington	1834
Westmorland	William Wilson	1837, 1846
Westmorland	William Hazen Botsford	1843
Westmorland	Amand Landry	1846
York	Lemuel A. Wilmot	1834
York	Charles Fisher	1837
York	James Taylor	1833
York	Thomas Baillie	1846

Preceded by 13th New Brunswick Legislature	Legislative Assemblies of New Brunswick; 1847–1850	Succeeded by 15th New Brunswick Legislature
