= 17th New Brunswick Legislature =

The 17th New Brunswick Legislative Assembly represented New Brunswick between July 17, 1856, and April 1, 1857.

The assembly sat at the pleasure of the Governor of New Brunswick John Henry Thomas Manners-Sutton.

Charles Simonds was chosen as speaker for the house.

== List of members ==
Electoral District	Name	First elected / previously elected
Albert	John Lewis	1856
Albert	Abner R. McClelan	1854
Carleton	Charles Connell	1846
Carleton	Charles Perley	1843, 1856
Charlotte	James Boyd	1854
Charlotte	Arthur Hill Gillmor	1854
Charlotte	John McAdam	1854
Charlotte	George Dixon Street	1856
Gloucester	Joseph Read	1846, 1856
Gloucester	William End	1830, 1854
Kent	Francis McPhelim	1850
Kent	Lestock P. W. DesBrisay	1856
Kings	Sylvester Z. Earle	1843, 1856
Kings	Hugh McMonagle	1856
Kings	Walter B. Scovil	1856
Northumberland	George Kerr	1852
Northumberland	Peter Mitchell	1852, 1856
Northumberland	Richard Sutton	1854
Northumberland	John M. Johnson	1850
Queens	John Earle	1856
Queens	John Ferris	1854
Restigouche	John Montgomery	1846
Restigouche	Andrew Barberie	1843, 1856
Saint John City	James A. Harding	1851
Saint John City	Joseph Wilson Lawrence	1856
Saint John County	John H. Gray	1850
Saint John County	Robert D. Wilmot	1846
Saint John County	John F. Godard	1850, 1855
Saint John County	Charles Simonds	1820, 1850, 1856
Sunbury	William E. Perley	1856
Sunbury	David Tapley	1856
Victoria	Charles Watters	1855
Victoria	James Tibbits	1854
Westmorland	Albert J. Smith	1854
Westmorland	Bliss Botsford	1850, 1856
Westmorland	Amand Landry	1846, 1853
Westmorland	Robert K. Gilbert	1856
York	Charles Macpherson	1851
York	John C. Allen	1856
York	Charles Fisher	1854
York	George L. Hatheway	1850

Preceded by 16th New Brunswick Legislature	Legislative Assemblies of New Brunswick; 1856–1857	Succeeded by 18th New Brunswick Legislature
