= 19th New Brunswick Legislature =

The 19th New Brunswick Legislative Assembly represented New Brunswick between February 12, 1862, and February 8, 1865.

== Members ==
Electoral District	Name	First elected / previously elected
Albert	Abner R. McClelan	1854
Albert	Reuben Stiles	1861
Carleton	David Munro	1861
Carleton	William Lindsay	1861
Carleton	Charles Connell (1864)	1846, 1864
Charlotte	Arthur Hill Gillmor	1854
Charlotte	George S. Grimmer (Note: resigned to accept appointment as Clerk of the Peace)	1861
Charlotte	James Boyd	1854, 1861
Charlotte	James G. Stevens	1861
Charlotte	John McAdam (1864)	1864
Gloucester	Robert Young	1861
Gloucester	John Meahan	1861
Kent	Francis McPhelim	1850
Kent	Lestock P. W. DesBrisay	1856
Kings	George Ryan	1850, 1861
Kings	Edwin A. Vail	1857
Kings	Walter Bates Scovil	1856
Northumberland	Robinson Crocker	1861
Northumberland	Edward Williston	1861
Northumberland	John M. Johnson	1850
Northumberland	George Kerr	1852
Northumberland	Richard Hutchison (1865)	1865
Queens	John Ferris	1854
Queens	Samuel H. Gilbert	1852, 1857
Restigouche	John McMillan	1857
Restigouche	John Montgomery	1846
Saint John City	Charles Watters	1855
Saint John City	Samuel Leonard Tilley	1850, 1854, 1857
Saint John County	John W. Cudlip	1857
Saint John County	Timothy W. Anglin	1861
Saint John County	John Jordan	1861
Saint John County	Charles N. Skinner	1861
Saint John County	John Hamilton Gray (1863)	1850, 1863
Sunbury	William Edward Perley	1856
Sunbury	John Glasier	1861
Victoria	David B. Raymond	1861
Victoria	John Costigan	1861
Victoria	Benjamin Beveridge (1863)	1863
Westmorland	Albert J. Smith	1854
Westmorland	James Steadman	1854, 1857
Westmorland	Amand Landry	1846, 1853, 1861
Westmorland	William J. Gilbert	1861
York	Charles Fisher	1854
York	George L. Hatheway	1850, 1861
York	John C. Allen	1856
York	Hiram Dow	1861

== Notes ==
Preceded by 18th New Brunswick Legislature	Legislative Assemblies of New Brunswick; 1862–1865	Succeeded by 20th New Brunswick Legislature
