= 31st New Brunswick Legislature =

The 31st New Brunswick Legislative Assembly represented New Brunswick between March 26, 1903, and January 23, 1908.

Jabez Bunting Snowball served as Lieutenant-Governor of New Brunswick until March 1907 when he was succeeded by Lemuel John Tweedie.

C.W. Robinson was chosen as speaker. Charles J. Osman was selected as speaker in 1907 after Robinson became premier for the province.

The Liberal Party led by Lemuel John Tweedie formed the government. William Pugsley became party leader in 1907 when Tweedie became lieutenant governor. Clifford William Robinson succeeded Pugsley later that year when Pugsley entered federal politics.

== Members ==
Electoral District	Name	Party	First elected / previously elected
Albert	Charles J. Osman	Conservative	1897
Albert	Sanford S. Ryan	Independent	1900
Carleton	Benjamin F. Smith	Conservative	1903
Carleton	James K. Fleming	Conservative	1900
Carleton	Wendell P. Jones	Liberal	1903
Charlotte	Thomas A. Hartt	Conservative	1903
Charlotte	Ward C.H. Grimmer	Conservative	1903
Charlotte	George J. Clarke	Conservative	1903
Charlotte	George F. Hill	Liberal	1878, 1892
Gloucester	Joseph Poirier	Conservative	1890, 1898
Gloucester	Theobald M. Burns	Conservative	1899
Gloucester	John Young	Independent	1899
Kent	James Barnes	Liberal	1895
Kent	Jean-Baptiste Goguen	Conservative	1892, 1903
Kent	Urbain Johnson	Liberal	1869, 1874, 1895
Kings	George G. Scovil	Liberal	1892
Kings	Ora P. King	Independent	1902
Kings	William Pugsley	Liberal	1885, 1899
Madawaska	Narcisse A. Gagnon	Independent	1899
Madawaska	Thomas Clair	Liberal	1903
Madawaska	Cyprien Martin (1903)	Liberal	1895, 1903
Northumberland	John Morrissy	Liberal	1887, 1903
Northumberland	William S. Loggie	Liberal	1903
Northumberland	Lemuel J. Tweedie	Liberal	1874, 1886
Northumberland	Donald Morrison	Conservative	1903
Northumberland	Robert Murray (1905)	Liberal	1905
Queens	Laughlin P. Farris	Liberal	1892
Queens	Isaac W. Carpenter	Independent	1896
Restigouche	Charles H. LaBillois	Conservative	1892
Restigouche	Henry F. McLatchy	Independent	1900
Restigouche	William Currie (1907)	Liberal	1907
Saint John City	Harrison A. McKeown	Conservative	1890, 1899
Saint John City	George Robertson	Independent	1899
Saint John City	Daniel S. Purdy	Independent	1899
Saint John City	Edward Lantalum	Independent	1903
Saint John City	Robert Maxwell (1905)	Independent	1905
Saint John County	Albert T. Dunn	Liberal	1892
Saint John County	Robert C. Ruddick	Independent	1902
Saint John County	James Lowell (1905)	Conservative	1905
Saint John County	Harrison A. McKeown (1907)	Independent	1907
Sunbury	Parker Glasier	Conservative	1899
Sunbury	John D. Hazen	Conservative	1899
Victoria	John F. Tweeddale	Liberal	1903
Victoria	James Burgess, Jr.	Independent	1903
Westmorland	Arthur B. Copp	Liberal	1901
Westmorland	Clifford W. Robinson	Liberal	1897
Westmorland	Francis J. Sweeney	Liberal	1903
Westmorland	Clement M. Leger	Liberal	1903
York	William T. Whitehead	Independent	1899
York	George W. Allen	Independent	1901
York	John A. Campbell	Independent	1899
York	George F. Burden	Independent	1903

Preceded by 30th New Brunswick Legislature	Legislative Assemblies of New Brunswick; 1903–1908	Succeeded by 32nd New Brunswick Legislature
