= Minister of the Department of Transportation and Infrastructure (New Brunswick) =

Minister of Transportation and Infrastructure (New Brunswick) of New Brunswick
- Incumbent; Chuck Chiasson since November 2, 2024
- Department of Transportation and Infrastructure
- Style: The Honourable
- Member of: Executive Council
- Reports to: Premier of New Brunswick
- Appointer: Lieutenant Governor of New Brunswick
- Term length: At His Majesty's pleasure

Minister of the Department of Transportation and Infrastructure.

Since 2012, the Department of Transportation and the infrastructure management components of the Department of Supply and Services (the successor to the Department of Public Works) are merged back together which gave the charges of the minister of the department of Public Works back to the minister of transportation.

== 2012-present ==
#	Minister	Term	Administration of:
1.	Claude Williams	October 12, 2010* - October 7, 2014	David Alward
2.	Roger Melanson	October 7, 2014 - June 6, 2016	Brian Gallant
3.	Bill Fraser	June 6, 2016 - October 5, 2018	Brian Gallant
4.	Denis Landry	October 5, 2018 - November 9, 2018	Brian Gallant
5.	Bill Oliver	November 9, 2018 - September 29, 2020	Blaine Higgs
6.	Jill Green	September 29, 2020 - October 13, 2022	Blaine Higgs
7.	Jeff Carr	October 13, 2022 - June 27, 2023	Blaine Higgs
8.	Richard Ames	June 27, 2023 - November 2, 2024	Blaine Higgs
9.	Chuck Chiasson	November 2, 2024 - present	Susan Holt

* Williams served as Minister of Transportation and Minister of Supply and Services styled as Minister of Transportation of Infrastructure from October 12, 2010 and the formal establishment of the Department of Transportation and Infrastructure on March 15, 2012.

== 1967-2012 ==
See Department of Transportation (New Brunswick) and Department of Supply and Services (New Brunswick).

== 1856-1967 ==
#	Minister	Term	Administration of:
1.	George J. Colter	June, 1856 - June 8, 1857	John Hamilton Gray
2.	G. L. Hatheway	July 25, 1861 - April 14, 1866	Tilley/Smith
3.	John McAdam	1867 - 1868	Andrew Rainsford Wetmore
4.	W. M. Kelly	April 22, 1869 - 1882?	Wetmore/King/Fraser
	George J. Colter	May 25, 1882 - February 26, 1883	Daniel Lionel Hanington
5.	P. G. Ryan	March 3, 1883 - October 10, 1892	Andrew George Blair
6.	H. R. Emmerson	October 10, 1892 - August 31, 1900	Blair/Mitchell/Emmerson
7.	Charles H. LaBillois	1900-1908	Lemuel John Tweedie
8.	John Morrissy	March 24, 1908 - May 10, 1916	Hazen/Fleming/Clarke
9.	P. G. Mahoney	May 10, 1916 - August 18, 1916	George Johnson Clarke
10.	B. F. Smith	August 18, 1916 - April 5, 1917	Clarke/Murray
11.	P. J. Veniot	April 4, 1917 - January 31, 1923	Walter Edward Foster
12.	D. A. Stewart	September 14, 1925 - June, 1935	Veniot/Baxter/Richards/Tilley
13.	A. A. Dysart	July 16, 1935? - 1938	Allison Dysart
14.	W. S. Anderson	July 16, 1938? - October 8, 1952	Dysart/McNair
15.	H. J. Fleming	October 8, 1952 - August 1, 1958	Hugh John Flemming
16.	J. Stewart Brooks	August 1, 1958 - July 12, 1960	Hugh John Flemming
17.	André Richard	July 12, 1960 - November 20, 1967	Louis Robichaud
