= John C. Brown (disambiguation) =

John C. Brown (1827–1889) was a Confederate general and Tennessee governor. John C. Brown may also refer to:

- John C. Brown (offensive tackle) (born 1939), American NFL football offensive tackle
- John C. Brown (Ohio politician) (1844–1900), American politician
- John Cameron Brown (c. 1843–?), Canadian political figure in New Brunswick
- John Campbell Brown (1947–2019), Scottish astronomer
- John Carter Brown (1797–1874), American book collector and antiquarian
- John Crawford Brown (1805–1867), Scottish landscape painter
- John Crosby Brown (1838–1909), American banker; partner in Brown Bros. & Co.
- John Croumbie Brown (1808–1895), Scottish missionary and forestry pioneer in South Africa
- John Cunningham Brown (1844–1929), Irish-born political figure in British Columbia
