= Julia Catherine Beckwith =

Canadian writer (1796–1867)

Julia Catherine Beckwith (Hart)
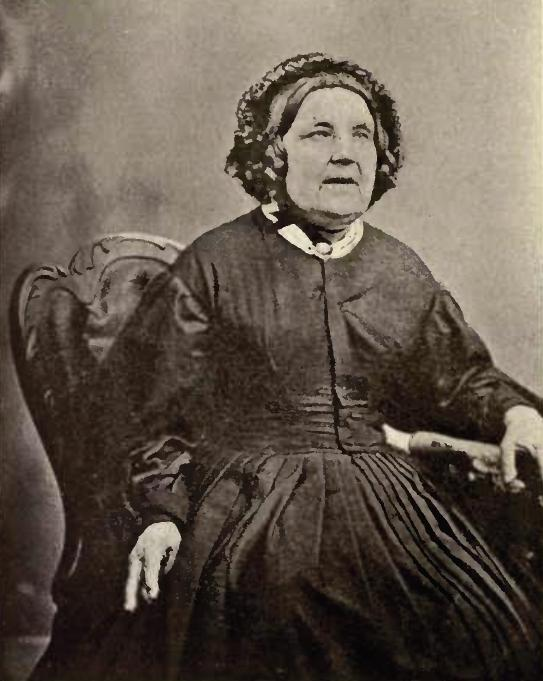
- Mrs Julia Catherine Beckwith (Hart)
- Born: March 10, 1796; Fredericton, New Brunswick, British Empire
- Died: November 28, 1867 (aged 71); Fredericton, New Brunswick, Canada
- Occupation: Writer
- Spouse: George Henry Hart
- Children: Six
- Relatives: Father: Nehemiah Beckwith; Mother: Julie-Louis Leburn
- Writing career
- Notable works: St. Ursula's Convent; St. Ursula's Convent or, The Nun of Canada; Containing Scenes from Real Life

Julia Catherine Beckwith Hart (March 10, 1796 – November 28, 1867) is credited for being Canada's first Canadian-born fiction novelist and romance author.

== Early life ==
Born in Fredericton, New Brunswick, she spent much of her early life in Nova Scotia and Quebec. Her mother Julie-Louise Le Brun, daughter of Jean Baptiste Le Brun de Duplessis, came from a wealthy French family who immigrated to Canada during the 17th and 18th century. Hart's father Nehemiah Beckwith (Pre-Loyalist), was from New England and settled in New Brunswick in 1780, where he owned a successful ship building company. It was through her travels to Quebec and Nova Scotia that she incorporated her experiences through her novels. Two years after Hart wrote her novel, her father died in a drowning accident and in 1820 and she was sent to live in Upper Canada (Kingston) with family where she would establish a boarding school for girls and meet and then marry George Henry Hart (between 1822 and 1824).

== Career ==
Hart's mother had renounced her Roman Catholic faith and shared her husbands Methodist views, yet it was her mother's religious background that would provide the subject matter of Canada's first novel St Ursula's Convent (or The Nun of Canada) at the age of seventeen.

It took over ten years for Hart to find someone who would publish her work. In 1824, Hugh C. Thomson agreed to publish St. Ursula's Convent or, The Nun of Canada; Containing Scenes from Real Life, and as Hart wished, as an anonymous author. However, only 165 copies were made. After Hart's romantic novel was criticized as "too complicated", almost all copies were lost.

Later, Hart and her husband moved to the United States where she would write her second novel Tonnawanda; or, The Adopted Son of America; an Indian Story and was published in Rochester, N.Y., as "By an American." In 1831 Hart, along with her husband and six children, moved back to Fredericton, where she would write her third novel in manuscript Edith (or The Doom) that was never published.

== Later life and death ==
In 1831 Hart returned to Fredericton, New Brunswick. On November 28, 1867, Hart died in Fredericton, New Brunswick at the age of 71.

== Genealogy ==
Research by Christine Lavallée revealed that Hart's brother (John Adolphus Beckwith) was the grandfather of Premier John Douglas Hazen and that Hart's extended family married into President Abraham Lincoln's family through Hart's uncle, Samuel Beckwith.

== Posthumous recognition ==
Hart was not recognized until at the end of the century when Canadian writing became of interest. In 1904, chief librarian of the Toronto Public Library, James Bain, obtained a copy of St. Ursula's Convent at an auction for $8.00. Only five other copies have been discovered (one at the Library of Congress in Washington, the others at the Bibliothèque Nationale de Quebec, Brock University and the University of New Brunswick) and one partial copy resides at the library of McGill University.

== Personal life ==
She married George Henry Hart in Kingston, Ontario on January 3, 1822.
