= Lestock P. W. DesBrisay =

Canadian politician (1820–1872)

Lestock Peach Wilson DesBrisay (March 28, 1820 – December 10, 1872) was a Canadian businessman and politician in the province of New Brunswick.

DesBrisay was born in Charlottetown, Prince Edward Island, the son of Lucy Wright and her husband Theophilus DesBrisay, Jr. (1789–1847), a naval officer from St. John's Island. In 1824 the family moved to Chatham, New Brunswick where Theophilus DesBrisay, Jr. served as special assistant to the customs service.

A businessman, Lestock P. W. DesBrisay made his home in Richibucto and, on October 14, 1841, he married Diana Gay Smith, daughter of Dr. Rufus Smith, a former member of the Legislative Assembly of New Brunswick for Westmorland County. DesBrisay followed in his father-in-law's footsteps and in 1856 DesBrisay was elected to the 17th New Brunswick Legislative Assembly for Kent County. He served more than ten years, being reelected in 1857 through 1865 to the 18th, 19th and 20th Legislative assemblies.. DesBrisay ran unsuccessfully for a seat in the House of Commons in 1867.

Lestock DesBrisay died in 1872.

1867 Canadian federal election: Kent
Party	Candidate	Votes	%	Elected
Liberal	Auguste Renaud	2,225	64.1	✓
Unknown	Lestock P. W. DesBrisay	757	21.8	
Unknown	Owen McInerney	485	14.0	
Unknown	Robert Barry Cutler	4	0.2	
Source: Canadian Elections Database
