= John James Fraser =

Canadian politician

The Honourable John James Fraser
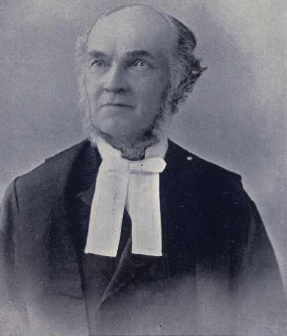
- Justice John James Fraser

5th Premier of New Brunswick
- In office May 3, 1878 – May 25, 1882
- Monarch: Victoria
- Lieutenant Governor: Samuel Leonard Tilley; Edward Barron Chandler; Robert Duncan Wilmot
- Preceded by: George E. King
- Succeeded by: Daniel L. Hanington

9th Lieutenant Governor of New Brunswick
- In office December 20, 1893 – November 24, 1896
- Monarch: Victoria
- Governor General: The Earl of Aberdeen
- Premier: Andrew George Blair; James Mitchell
- Preceded by: John Boyd
- Succeeded by: Abner Reid McClelan

MLA for York
- In office March 2, 1865 – June 1, 1866 Serving with George Luther Hatheway, William Hayden Needham, John Campbell Allen
- Preceded by: Charles Fisher
- Succeeded by: Charles Fisher
- In office August 3, 1872 – May 25, 1882 Serving with Robert Robinson, Andrew George Blair, Charles McPherson, Thomas F. Barker, Frederick P. Thompson, John Adolphus Beckwith, Hiram Dow, George J. Colter
- Preceded by: George Luther Hatheway
- Succeeded by: Edward Ludlow Wetmore

Personal details
- Born: August 1, 1829 Beaubears Island, New Brunswick, Canada
- Died: November 24, 1896 (aged 67) Genoa, Italy
- Party: Conservative
- Spouses: Martha Cumming (m. 1867; died 1871) Jane Maria Paulette Fisher (m. 1881)
- Children: 2 daughters who died in infancy
- Occupation: Lawyer, judge
- Profession: Politician

John James Fraser (August 1, 1829 – November 24, 1896) was a New Brunswick (Canada) lawyer, judge, and politician.

John Fraser was born at Beaubears Island, New Brunswick. He married twice, the first time in 1867 to Martha Cumming. She died in 1871, and in 1884 he married Jane Maria Paulette Fisher, the eldest daughter of former Premier, Charles Fisher.

In 1865 he won a seat in the colonial legislature as an Anti-Confederation Party MLA but lost his seat the next year. After Canadian Confederation he ultimately joined the government and was appointed to the legislative council serving as president of the Executive Council from 1871 to 1872. That year he won a seat in the legislature and served as Provincial Secretary from 1872 to 1878 when he succeeded George E. King as Premier and Attorney-General.

Fraser was the first premier to give both the Acadian and the Irish sections of the Roman Catholic community effective representation in cabinet. Pierre-Amand Landry was made commissioner of public works, while Michael Adams became a surveyor-general with responsibility for administering crown lands.

In 1882, after running unsuccessfully for a seat in the federal parliament, Fraser left politics and was appointed to the provincial supreme court and from 1893 to 1896 he served as the ninth Lieutenant Governor of the province.

John Fraser died in 1896 in Genoa, Italy.
