= John Cameron Brown =

Canadian politician (born c. 1843)

John Cameron Brown (born c. 1843) was a civil engineer and political figure in New Brunswick, Canada. He represented Charlotte County in the Legislative Assembly of New Brunswick from 1872 to 1874 as a Liberal member.

He was born at Tower Hill in Charlotte County near St. Andrews, the son of James Brown and Catherine Gillespie (née Cameron). He worked on the construction of a number of railways including the Intercolonial Railway. Brown was elected to the provincial assembly in an 1872 by-election held after John McAdam was elected to the House of Commons.
