= Jacob C. Gough =

Canadian politician

Jacob Carvell Gough (May 9, 1840 – ?) was a merchant, ship builder and political figure in New Brunswick. He represented Northumberland County in the Legislative Assembly of New Brunswick from 1868 to 1874.

He was born in Fredericton, New Brunswick, the son of James Gough and Isabella Carvell, and educated in Sackville. His father died while he was still young and his mother married Peter Mitchell in 1853. In 1862, he married Henrietta Porter. He ran unsuccessfully for a seat in the House of Commons in 1868 but was elected to the provincial assembly later that year. Gough also served as a justice of the peace and a lieutenant in the county militia.
