= Finnemore E. Morton =

Member of the Legislative Assembly of New Brunswick
- In office 1879–1886 Serving with Edwin Arnold Vail, William Pugsley, Gabriel Flewelling, John Herbert Crawford
- Constituency: Kings County

Personal details
- Born: January 21, 1832 Digby, Nova Scotia
- Died: January 26, 1899 (aged 67) Sussex, New Brunswick
- Party: Independent
- Spouse: Charlotte Elizabeth Wallace (m. 1887)
- Occupation: Lawyer

Finnemore E. Morton (January 21, 1832 – January 26, 1899) was a Canadian politician. He served in the Legislative Assembly of New Brunswick from 1879 to 1886 as an independent member. He served as Solicitor General in 1882. Morton was a lawyer, having been called to the bar in 1875 and appointed Queen's Counsel in 1882.
