= Arthur Glasier =

Canadian politician (1853 – 1922)

MLA for Sunbury County
- In office 1883 to 1890

Personal details
- Born: March 17, 1853 Fredericton, New Brunswick, British North America
- Died: February 16, 1922 (aged 68) Ottawa, Ontario, Canada
- Party: Liberal Party of New Brunswick
- Relations: John Glasier

Arthur Glasier (March 17, 1853 – February 16, 1922) was an agriculturalist and political figure in New Brunswick, Canada. He represented Sunbury County in the Legislative Assembly of New Brunswick from 1883 to 1890 as a Liberal member.

He was born in Fredericton, New Brunswick, the son of John Glasier, and educated there. He ran unsuccessfully for a seat in the provincial assembly in 1882 and was subsequently elected in an 1883 by-election held after the death of George A. Sterling. Glasier resigned his seat after an appeal but was reelected in the by-election that followed in 1885. He died in 1922 in Ottawa, Ontario.
