= James Ryan (Canadian politician) =

Canadian politician

James Ryan (March 15, 1821 – 1892) was a political figure in New Brunswick, Canada. He represented Albert County in the Legislative Assembly of New Brunswick from 1870 to 1878 as a Liberal member.

He was born in Kings County, New Brunswick, the son of Matthew Ryan. In 1848, he married Elizabeth Trites. Ryan was a justice of the peace. His election in 1875 was appealed but he won the by-election that followed later that year.
