= William Wilson (New Brunswick politician) =

Canadian politician (1845–1921)

William Wilson (June 2, 1845 – September 29, 1921) was a lawyer and political figure in New Brunswick, Canada. He represented York County in the Legislative Assembly of New Brunswick from 1885 to 1892 as a Liberal member.

He was born in Douglas, New Brunswick, the son of William Wilson, an Irish immigrant, and Maria Pugh. Wilson was educated there, in Fredericton and at the University of New Brunswick. He was called to the bar in 1876. In 1879, Wilson married Irene Thompson. He served as Grand Master for the provincial Orange Association. Wilson served on the county councillor and a city councillor for Fredericton City Council. He also was secretary-treasurer for York County. He was first elected to the provincial assembly in an 1885 by-election held after Frederick P. Thompson was named to the province's Legislative Council.
