= Amos Botsford =

Canadian politician

Amos Botsford (January 31, 1744/1745 – September 14, 1812) was a lawyer, judge, land owner and political figure in New Brunswick. He represented Westmorland County in the Legislative Assembly of New Brunswick from 1786 to 1812.

He was born in Newton, Connecticut Colony, the son of Gideon Botsford, a farmer, and Bertha Bennett and was educated at Yale College. He studied law with Jared Ingersoll, was admitted to the bar and taught law at Yale. In 1770, he married Sarah Chandler. Because Botsford remained loyal to Britain, his property was confiscated and, in July 1779, he left Connecticut.

In 1782, he was sent to Nova Scotia with a group of Loyalists from New York state; Botsford helped identify possible areas in the region for loyalist settlements. In 1784, he moved to Dorchester, New Brunswick. Botsford was named clerk of the peace, judge for the Inferior Court of Common Pleas and registrar of deeds for Westmorland. He was chosen as speaker for the first legislative assembly and performed that function until his death in Saint John in 1812. Botsford opposed the choice of St Anne's Point (later Fredericton) as the capital of New Brunswick. Besides his law practice, he also farmed and rented farm land and owned a retail business.

His son William also represented the county in the legislative assembly and later became a judge in the province's Supreme Court. His grandson Amos Edwin Botsford served in the Senate of Canada.
