= George S. Grimmer =

Canadian politician

George Skeffington Grimmer, QC (June 11, 1826 – March 1, 1887) was a lawyer and political figure in New Brunswick. He represented Charlotte County in the Legislative Assembly of New Brunswick from 1862 to 1864 as a Liberal member.

He was born in St. Stephen, New Brunswick, the son of Elizabeth Maxwell, daughter of a United Empire Loyalist, and her husband John Davidson Grimmer (1851–1936), a ship builder of German descent whose ancestor Thomas Grimmer (1759–1828) was also a United Empire Loyalist. His mother and he were educated in St. Stephen and at Washington Academy in East Machias, Maine.

Grimmer studied law with James Watson Chandler, was called to the bar in 1849 and set up practice in Charlotte County. In 1851 he married Mary Allan Hazen (1823–1906) and in 1865 the couple moved to a home in Chamcook, New Brunswick. He resigned his seat in the legislative assembly after he was named Clerk of the Peace for the county in 1864. He later served as clerk for the county court and for the circuit court and then was secretary for the county. Grimmer also served as a captain in the county militia. In 1873, he was named Queen's Counsel.

George Grimmer died in 1887. He and his wife are buried in the St. John the Baptist Chapel of Ease Anglican Church Cemetery in Chamcook. Their son, W.C.H. Grimmer, followed in his father's footsteps and became a lawyer who also served in the Legislative Assembly of New Brunswick from 1903 to 1917.
