= Robert Leonard Hazen =

Canadian politician

Robert Leonard Hazen (15 October 1808 – 15 August 1874) was a Canadian lawyer, judge, and politician.

Hazen was born in Fredericton, New Brunswick, and by age 23 had been called to the bar of New Brunswick. He had a successful legal career, and by 1846 was appointed a judge on the Court of the Vice-Admiralty. He first entered politics in 1837 when he was elected to the Legislative Assembly of New Brunswick. Upon Canadian Confederation he was appointed to the new Senate of Canada on 23 October 1867 by royal proclamation. He represented the senatorial division of New Brunswick until his death.

Robert Leonard Hazen was the grandson of William Hazen, a prominent New Brunswick businessman and officeholder who was born in Haverhill, Massachusetts.

== Sources ==
- Lindo, P.R. (1972). "Hazen, Robert Leonard". In Hayne, David (ed.). Dictionary of Canadian Biography. Vol. X (1871–1880) (online ed.). University of Toronto Press.
