= William Moore Kelly =

Canadian politician

William Moore Kelly (1827 – December 10, 1888) was a businessman and politician in New Brunswick. He represented Northumberland County in the Legislative Assembly of New Brunswick from 1867 to 1878.

He was born in Moncton, New Brunswick, the son of J.M. Kelly, an Irish immigrant. Kelly operated a stage coach between Moncton and Chatham. He married Eliza Ann Long and later married Margaret Fraser after his first wife's death. He was first elected to the legislature in an 1867 by-election held after John Mercer Johnson was elected to the Canadian House of Commons. From 1869 to 1878, he served as commissioner of public works in the province's Executive Council. He was heavily criticized later in his political career for accepting compensation in return for directing railway contracts to specific contractors. From 1878 to 1882, Kelly served as a member of the Legislative Council of New Brunswick. In 1882, he resigned due to poor health and moved to Toronto, Ontario. He died in Montreal, Quebec at the age of 61 while visiting a son there.
