= John S. Leighton =

Canadian politician

John Stewart Leighton (November 8, 1835 – January 25, 1916) was a farmer, merchant and political figure in New Brunswick. He represented Carleton County in the Legislative Assembly of New Brunswick from 1874 to 1886 as a Liberal member.

He was born in Charlotte County, New Brunswick, the son of James Leighton and Ann Stewart. Besides farming, Leighton also became involved in the lumber trade. In 1864, he married Amanda M. Collins; she died in 1875. He lived at Richmond from 1864 to 1873, served on the council for Carleton County and operated the local post office. Leighton also served as a school trustee. In 1873, he moved to Woodstock, where he owned a store. Leighton also owned a store in Houlton, Maine.
