= Robert Murray (New Brunswick politician) =

Robert Murray (July 17, 1853 – July 8, 1926) was a New Brunswick lawyer, police magistrate, and political figure. He represented Northumberland County as a Liberal member in the Legislative Assembly of New Brunswick from 1905 to 1908 and 1917 to 1920.

He was returned by acclamation in 1905 to fill the seat vacated by William S. Loggie who had been elected to the House of Commons of Canada in the general election of 1904. Returning to his legal practice after his defeat in the 1908 New Brunswick general election, he was re-elected in 1917 and served as Provincial Secretary-Treasurer until his defeat in the 1920 New Brunswick general election, after which he retired definitively from politics.
