= William Botsford =

Canadian politician

William Botsford (April 29, 1773 – May 8, 1864) was a lawyer, judge and political figure in the pre-Confederation Province of New Brunswick, Canada.

He was born in New Haven, Connecticut Colony, the son of Amos Botsford and Sarah Chandler, and went to Annapolis Royal, Nova Scotia with his family in 1782. The family settled at Westcock, New Brunswick two years later. Botsford was educated at Yale College, studied law with Jonathan Bliss and was called to the bar in 1795. In 1802, he married Sarah Lowell Hazen. From 1803 to 1808, he served as judge in the vice admiralty court. He was elected to the Legislative Assembly of New Brunswick in 1812 for Westmorland County following the death of his father. In 1816, he was named solicitor general and, in 1817, speaker for the assembly. In 1823, he became a judge in the province's Supreme Court. He retired to Westcock in 1845 and lived there until his death in 1864.

His sons Bliss, Hazen and Chipman served in the legislative assembly and his son Amos Edwin served in the Senate of Canada.
