= Cyprien Martin =

Canadian politician

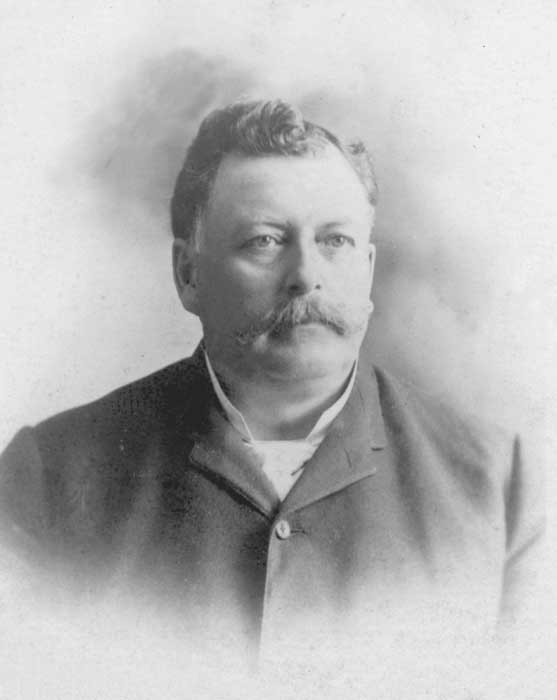
Portrait of Cyprien Martin (1860-1920).

Cyprien Martin (1860 – 1920) was a political figure in New Brunswick. He represented Madawaska County in the Legislative Assembly of New Brunswick from 1895 to 1899 and from 1903 to 1908 as a Liberal member.

He was the son of Rémi Martin and Éléonore Daigle and was educated at the College of Sainte-Anne-de-la-Pocatière. In 1887, he married Marie-Luce Daigle. He was a postmaster and custom officer for Saint-Basile. Martin also served as a member of the county council. He was elected to the provincial assembly the second time in a by-election held in December 1903.
