= James Watson Chandler =

Canadian lawyer, judge and politician

James Watson Chandler (July 18, 1801 – October 3, 1870) was a lawyer, judge, and political figure in New Brunswick. He represented Charlotte County in the Legislative Assembly of New Brunswick from 1857 to 1861.

He was born in Nova Scotia, the son of Samuel Chandler and Susan Watson, and was educated there. He went on to study law, moved to New Brunswick around 1829 and was admitted to the bar in the same year. He set up practice in St. Andrews. In 1843, he married Julia Hatheway. Chandler served as a justice of the peace, a judge in the Inferior Court of Common Pleas and a judge in the Probate Court. From 1852 to 1854, he also served on a commission to codify the provincial statutes. Chandler ran unsuccessfully for a seat in the provincial assembly in 1846 and 1854. He was defeated in a bid for reelection in 1861. Chandler supported Confederation and was elected again in 1866. He resigned his seat in 1867 after he was named judge in the courts for Westmorland, Kent, and Albert counties. He died in Moncton at the age of 69.

His cousin, Edward Barron Chandler, was a Father of Confederation and served as Lieutenant-Governor of New Brunswick.
