= Albert Scott White =

Canadian politician

Albert Scott White (April 12, 1855 – March 17, 1931) was a lawyer, politician, and judge in the Province of New Brunswick, Canada. From 1886 to 1903, he represented King's County as part of the official creation of the New Brunswick Liberal Party.

He was born in Sussex, New Brunswick; the only child of Margaret Scott and James E. White. He attended Mount Allison College for his undergraduate education before attending law school at Harvard University. He received his LL.B. from the latter in 1877. Thus began a 30-year career practicing law in Sussex. Additionally, in 1894 he was created a QC.

He married Ida Vaughan, and had one child, Donald Vaughan White.

From 1890 to 1892, White served as speaker for the provincial assembly, then in 1892 was named Solicitor General. He went on to be appointed Attorney General in October 1897, serving in this position until January 1900. After resigning his seat in provincial legislature, White became chair of the commission to revise New Brunswick statutes. In this time he also drafted the Railway Act of 1903.

After two unsuccessful bids for election to the House of Commons, White's acted as co-counsel in the prosecution of James Harvie Crocket, a Fredericton newspaper proprietor, in 1907.

He died in Saint John in 1931.
