= Robert Robinson (Canadian politician) =

Canadian politician

Robert Robinson (November 17, 1826 – September 5, 1885) was an Irish-born merchant, ship owner and political figure in New Brunswick. He represented York in the Legislative Assembly of New Brunswick from 1870 to 1878.

He was the son of George Robinson and came to York County, New Brunswick with his family. Robinson married Emma Pemberton. A resident of Canterbury, he served as warden for York County. Robinson was also a director for the Consolidated European and North American Railway, Western Extension. He was a supporter of the Common Schools Act of 1871. Robinson voted against the legislative union of the Maritime provinces proposed in 1875. He later settled in St. Andrews, Charlotte County.
