= John S. Covert =

Canadian politician

John Stewart Covert (died March 3, 1881) was a ship builder and political figure in New Brunswick, Canada. He represented Sunbury County from 1868 to 1881 in the Legislative Assembly of New Brunswick as a Liberal member.

He was born and educated in Maugerville, New Brunswick. He married a Miss Mouatt and then a Miss Hains after his first wife's death. He was first elected to the provincial assembly in an 1868 by-election held after John McAdam was named to the Canadian Senate. Covert was a member of the Executive Council from 1871 to 1873. He died in office of a heart attack at Saint John.
