= Charles A. Black =

Canadian politician

Charles Augustus Black (1837–1901) was a physician and political figure in New Brunswick, Canada. He represented Westmorland County in the Legislative Assembly of New Brunswick as a Conservative member from 1883 to 1886.

He was born in Sackville, New Brunswick, the son of Samuel F. Black, and educated at the Mount Allison Academy and the Lower Horton Seminary in Nova Scotia. He received his medical degree from the University of Pennsylvania in 1859. In 1860, Black married Elizabeth Silliker. He served on the county council and was warden for Westmorland County.
