= Robert Marshall (New Brunswick politician) =

Canadian politician

Robert Marshall (April 27, 1832 – May 26, 1904) was an insurance agent and political figure in New Brunswick. He represented the City of St. John in the Legislative Assembly of New Brunswick from 1876 to 1882 as a Liberal member.

He was born in Pictou County, Nova Scotia, the son of Alexander McNaughton Marshall, of Scottish descent. In 1837, he moved with his family to Chatham, New Brunswick and was educated there. Marshall became an accountant and clerk for a lumber firm at Miramichi, later moving to Saint John, where he was an accountant for the Intercolonial Railway. In 1855, he married Anna M. Henderson. He married Charlotte Neill Rees in 1863 after the death of his first wife. In 1866, he established an insurance agency at Satin John. Marshall also served as a notary public and magistrate for the city and county. He was a commissioner for the General Public Hospital at Saint John and a lieutenant in the local militia. Marshall was also a prominent member in the local Masonic lodge and a Grand Master for the province. He ran unsuccessfully for a seat in the provincial assembly in 1874 but was elected in an 1876 by-election held after the death of William H.A. Keans. The results of that election were appealed but Marshall also won the by-election that followed in 1877 and in the general election in 1878. He was named to the province's Executive Council as a minister without portfolio in December 1879.
