= Charles L. Smith (Canadian politician) =

Canadian politician

Charles L. Smith (1853 – ?) was a political figure in New Brunswick, Canada. He represented Carleton County in the Legislative Assembly of New Brunswick from 1895 to 1899 as a Liberal member.

He was born in Woodstock, New Brunswick, of United Empire Loyalist descent. Smith married Luella McClary. He was president of the Patrons of Industry association for the county. Smith also served as a member of the county council, also serving as county warden.
