= Robert C. Ruddick =

Former Canadian politician

Member of the Legislative Assembly of New Brunswick
- In office 1902–1907 Serving with Albert T. Dunn
- Constituency: Saint John County

Personal details
- Born: September 1, 1861 St. Martins, New Brunswick
- Died: 1921 (aged 59–60)
- Party: Independent
- Spouse: Eleanor Wallace (m. 1885)
- Children: 2
- Occupation: Physician

Robert Carter Ruddick (September 1, 1861 – 1921) was a Canadian politician. He served in the Legislative Assembly of New Brunswick from 1902 to 1907 as an Independent member.
