= Edward Barron Chandler =

Canadian Father of Confederation (1800–1880)

The Honourable Edward Barron Chandler
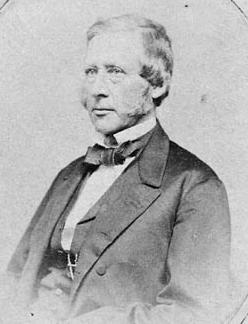
- Edward Barron Chandler

5th Lieutenant Governor of New Brunswick
- In office July 11, 1878 – February 6, 1880
- Monarch: Victoria
- Governors General: The Earl of Dufferin; Marquess of Lorne
- Premier: John James Fraser
- Preceded by: Samuel Leonard Tilley
- Succeeded by: Robert Duncan Wilmot

Government Leader of New Brunswick
- In office May 1848 – November 1, 1854
- Monarch: Victoria
- Lieutenant Governor: Sir Edmund Walker Head, Bt; Sir John Manners-Sutton
- Preceded by: New position
- Succeeded by: Charles Fisher

Personal details
- Born: August 22, 1800 Amherst, Nova Scotia
- Died: February 6, 1880 (aged 79) Fredericton, New Brunswick
- Party: Conservative
- Occupation: Lawyer
- Profession: Politician

Edward Barron Chandler (August 22, 1800 – February 6, 1880) was a New Brunswick politician and lawyer from a United Empire Loyalist family. He was one of the Fathers of Confederation.

== Early life ==
Edward Barron Chandler was born in Amherst, Nova Scotia on August 22, 1800, to parents Charles Henry Chandler and Elizabeth Rice. His grandfather, Colonel Joshua Chandler, was a wealthy Connecticut legislature member-turned loyalist.

== Career ==
He later moved to New Brunswick to study law. He moved to Dorchester, New Brunswick and served in the colony's government. In 1827 he was elected to the New Brunswick legislature as an opponent of responsible government and later served on the province's Legislative Council (the legislature's Upper House) and in Cabinet serving as leader of the "compact" government that ruled the colony from 1848 to 1854 prior to the institution of responsible government.

In 1836 Chandler became a member of New Brunswick's Legislative Council.

Later, Chandler was a New Brunswick delegate to the conferences in London, Charlottetown, and Quebec that led to Canadian Confederation. Though he supported the federal Conservatives of Sir John A. Macdonald he was a cautious supporter who opposed a strong central government.

Chandler was a supporter of railway development and was instrumental as a federally appointed commissioner overseeing construction of the Intercolonial Railway in having its surveys diverted from a direct route between Amherst and Moncton to run through his community of Dorchester. He also supported the policy of reciprocity with the United States. He refused an appointment to the Senate of Canada but accepted an appointment as the fifth Lieutenant Governor of New Brunswick in 1878.

Chandler was a Freemason of Sussex Lodge, No. 480 (England).

== Personal life and death ==
In 1822, Chandler married Phoebe Milledge; they had 11 children, of which seven survived into adulthood. Chandler died in Fredericton on February 6, 1880.

Chandler's home in Dorchester, Chandler House or Rocklyn, was designated a National Historic Site of Canada in 1971.

== See also ==
- List of New Brunswick lieutenant-governors
