= Robert J. Ritchie (politician) =

Canadian politician

Robert J. Ritchie was a lawyer and politician in New Brunswick, Canada. He represented St. John County in the Legislative Assembly of New Brunswick from 1878 to 1890.

He was born in Saint John, New Brunswick, of Irish descent. Ritchie was called to the bar in 1867. He served as solicitor general in the province's Executive Council.
