= Lemuel Allan Wilmot =

Canadian politician (1809–1878)

The Honourable Lemuel Allan Wilmot
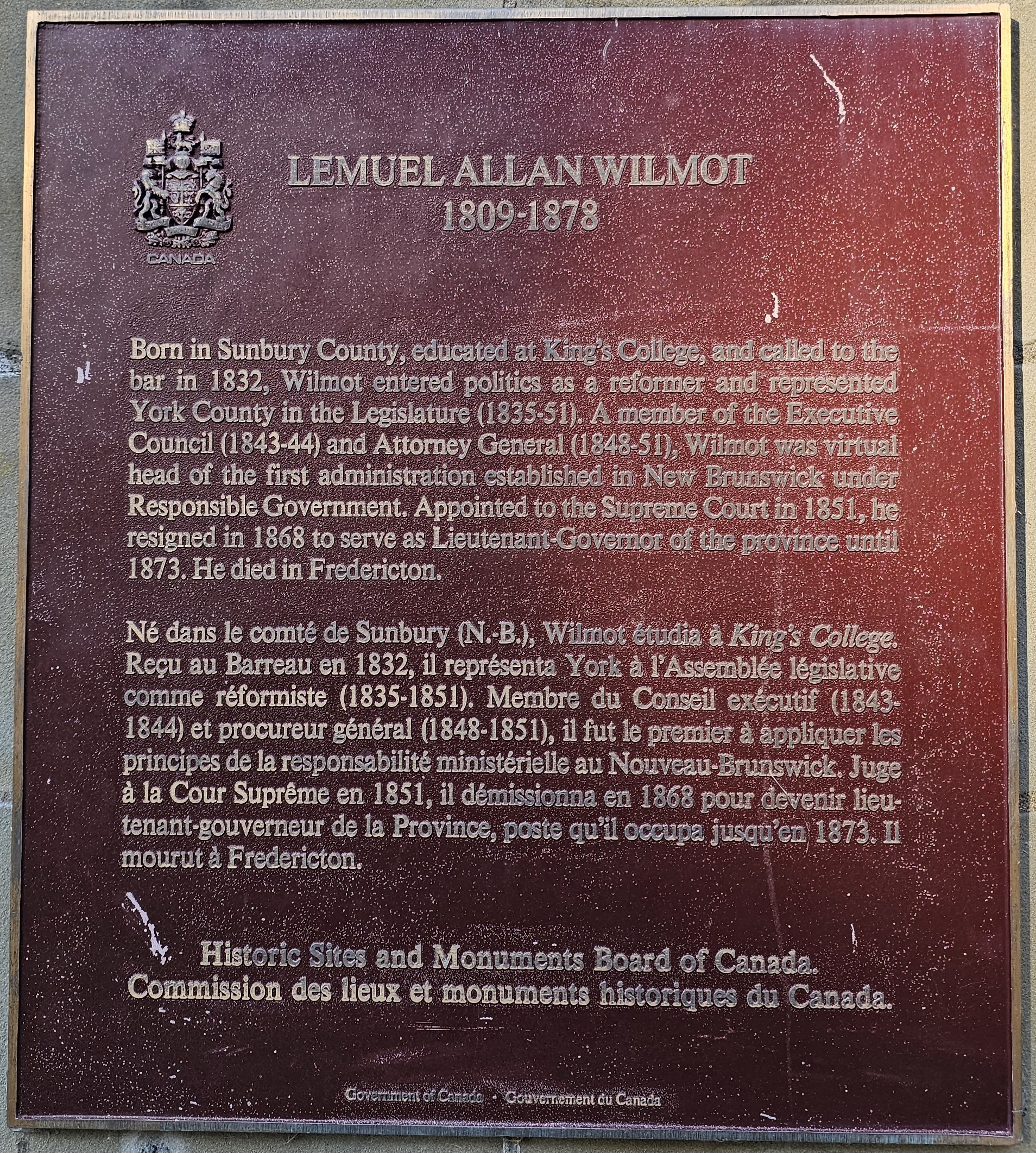
- A memorial plaque for Wilmot on the grounds of the New Brunswick Legislative Building

3rd Lieutenant Governor of New Brunswick
- In office 22 July 1868 – 15 November 1873
- Monarch: Victoria
- Governors General: The Viscount Monck; The Lord Lisgar
- Premier: Andrew Rainsford Wetmore; George Edwin King; George Luther Hatheway
- Preceded by: Francis Pym Harding
- Succeeded by: Samuel Leonard Tilley

Personal details
- Born: 30 January 1809 Sunbury County, New Brunswick, Canada
- Died: 20 May 1878 (aged 69) Fredericton, New Brunswick, Canada
- Party: Reformer
- Spouse: Margaret Elizabeth Black
- Education: King's College
- Occupation: Politician, lawyer, judge

Lemuel Allan Wilmot (31 January 1809 – 20 May 1878) was a Canadian lawyer, politician, and judge.

Born in Sunbury County, New Brunswick, the son of William M. Wilmot and Hannah Bliss, Wilmot was educated at the Fredericton grammar school and at King's College. He started articling law in 1825, became an attorney in 1830, and was admitted to the bar in 1832. He was created a Queen's Counsel in 1838.

From 1834 to 1851, he was a member of the Legislative Assembly of New Brunswick and was a Reformer. Responsible government was granted in 1848 and Wilmot served as Attorney-General from 1848 to 1851. From 1851 to 1868 he was a judge but was also outspoken in his support of Canadian Confederation which was achieved in 1867. He was the third Lieutenant Governor of New Brunswick from 1868 to 1873.

Wilmot had strong anti-Catholic and anti-French views once saying "Lower Canada would [not] be tranquillised and restored to a proper state, till all the French distinguishing marks were utterly abolished, and the English laws, language, and institutions, universally established throughout the Province."

In 1837, James Pierce, the publisher of the paper The Gleaner and Northumberland Schediasma was arrested and jailed for printing that Wilmot had "told an untruth" in the House of Assembly. He was held in York County Jail for 22 days, but he was released without charge after much criticism in other papers about freedom of the press.

A Methodist, he was the first non-conformist to serve as Attorney-General or as a judge in New Brunswick. He died in Fredericton in 1878 and is buried at Fredericton Rural Cemetery.
