= Harrison A. McKeown =

Canadian politician

Harrison Andrew McKeown (November 28, 1863 – July 10, 1932) was a lawyer, judge and political figure in New Brunswick, Canada. In the Legislative Assembly of New Brunswick, he represented Saint John County & City from 1890 to 1892, Saint John City from 1899 to 1904, and again Saint John County & City from late 1907 to 1909, always as a Liberal-Conservative member.

He was born in St. Stephen, New Brunswick and educated at Mount Allison University and Victoria University. McKeown was called to the bar in 1884. In 1908, he was named a justice in the Supreme Court of New Brunswick; he was later named the province's Chief Justice. In 1924, McKeown was named chairman of the board of Railway Commissioners after the death of Frank Broadstreet Carvell; he retired from that post in 1931. He also served as dean for the law faculty at the University of New Brunswick from 1922 to 1924.
