= Joseph Poirier (New Brunswick politician) =

Canadian politician

Joseph Poirier (1840 – 1914) was a merchant and political figure of Acadian descent in New Brunswick, Canada. He represented Gloucester County in the Legislative Assembly of New Brunswick from 1890 to 1892 and from 1899 to 1908 as a Conservative.

He was born in Grand Anse, New Brunswick, the son of Hubert Poirier. Poirier established himself as a merchant there and, in 1882, entered the lobster packing industry. He also was involved in the export of salmon. In 1860, he married Emelia Theriault. Poirier served as a member of the county council and was county warden. He was also a director of the Caraquet Railway.
