= John Adolphus Beckwith =

Canadian politician

Member of the Legislative Assembly of New Brunswick
- In office 1866–1871

Member of the Legislative Council of New Brunswick
- In office 1874–1880

Personal details
- Born: 1 December 1800 Fredericton, New Brunswick
- Died: 23 November 1880 (aged 79) Fredericton, New Brunswick

John Adolphus Beckwith (1 December 1800 – 23 November 1880) was a Canadian politician.

Born in Fredericton, New Brunswick, one of six children of Nehemiah Beckwith and Julie-Louise, Beckwith was a professional surveyor and engineer. He was mayor of Fredericton in 1863 and 1864. He was elected to the Legislative Assembly of New Brunswick in 1866. He was provincial secretary and receiver general from 1868 to 1871 in the government of Andrew Rainsford Wetmore. In 1874, he was appointed to the Legislative Council of New Brunswick.
