= Joseph Cunard Barberie =

Canadian politician

Joseph Cunard Barberie (February 1, 1835 – December 25, 1908 ) was a political figure in New Brunswick, Canada. He represented Restigouche County in the Legislative Assembly of New Brunswick as a Liberal member from 1879 to 1885.

He was born in Dalhousie, New Brunswick, the son of Andrew Barberie, who had also served in the legislative assembly. In 1866, he married Elizabeth, the daughter of former MLA John Phillips. Barberie served as clerk of the peace, registrar of probates, captain in the county militia and clerk for Restigouche. He was named to the Legislative Council of New Brunswick in 1885.
