= David McLellan (New Brunswick politician) =

Canadian politician

David McLellan (January 20, 1839 – December 19, 1894) was a merchant and political figure in New Brunswick. He represented St. John County in the Legislative Assembly of New Brunswick from 1878 to 1890 as a Liberal member.

He was born in Portland, St. John County, New Brunswick, the son of David McLellan, a Scottish immigrant, and Mary Knight, and was educated in Saint John. In 1865, he married Fannie B. Richards. McLellan was a partner in a lumber company. He was named provincial secretary in 1883. He was a freemason and a member of the Oddfellows.
