= Andrew Rainsford Wetmore =

Canadian politician

1st Premier of New Brunswick
- In office August 16, 1867 – May 25, 1870
- Monarch: Victoria
- Lieutenant Governor: Charles Hastings Doyle; Francis Pym Harding; Lemuel Allan Wilmot
- Preceded by: Office established
- Succeeded by: George E. King

MLA for Saint John City
- In office March 4, 1865 – May 25, 1870 Serving with Jacob Valentine Troop, Samuel Leonard Tilley
- Preceded by: Charles Watters
- Succeeded by: Aaron Alward

Personal details
- Born: August 16, 1820 Fredericton, New Brunswick
- Died: March 7, 1892 (aged 71) Fredericton, New Brunswick
- Party: Conservative
- Spouse: Louisa Elizabeth Lansdowne (m. 1848)
- Children: 9
- Education: Fredericton Collegiate School
- Occupation: Lawyer and judge
- Profession: politician

Andrew Rainsford Wetmore (August 16, 1820 – March 7, 1892) was a New Brunswick politician, jurist, and a member of a prominent United Empire Loyalist family.

Wetmore entered politics in 1865 with his election to the colonial legislature as an Anti-Confederate. His opposition to Canadian Confederation dissolved when he didn't get the appointment he expected as Attorney-General in the Anti-Confederate Party's government. Wetmore crossed the floor and joined the Confederation Party which formed the government in 1866. When New Brunswick joined Canada in 1867 many prominent pro-Confederation politicians assumed positions in the House of Commons of Canada, the courts or other offices. Wetmore was able to assume the leadership of the remaining Confederation Party forces in the legislature becoming Premier in 1867.

Wetmore's government helped finance extensions to rail lines in the province. His government also incorporated the College of Saint Joseph and granted full property rights to all married women living apart from, or deserted by, their husbands.

On May 25, 1870, he retired from politics to accept a position on the New Brunswick Supreme Court.
