= Albert T. Dunn =

Canadian politician

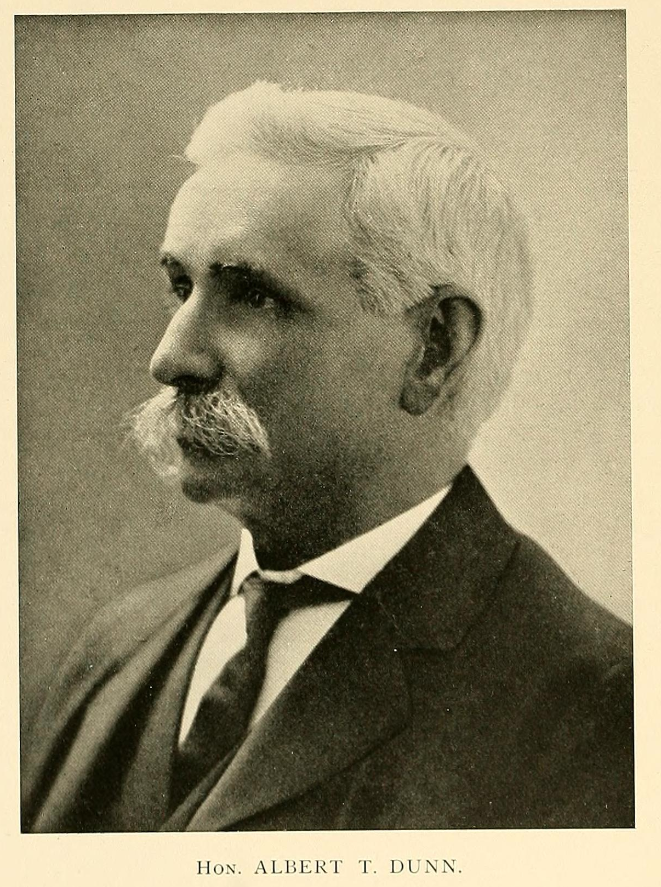

Albert T. Dunn (February 6, 1842 – April 30, 1916) was a political figure in New Brunswick. He represented Saint John County in the Legislative Assembly of New Brunswick from 1892 to 1908 as a Liberal member.

He was the son of John Dunn, who came to Saint John, New Brunswick from County Londonderry, Ireland, and Martha Gould. Dunn served as Surveyor General for the province. During the 1899 election, Dunn had a Conservative candidate arrested on a charge of libel.
