= William End =

Canadian politician

William End, QC (1798 – December 14, 1872) was an Irish-born lawyer and politician in New Brunswick. He represented Gloucester County in the Legislative Assembly of New Brunswick from 1830 to 1850 and from 1854 to 1861. He was assassinated in a house fire by an unknown assailant on December 14, 1872.

== Biography ==
End was born in Limerick and came to New Brunswick, where he studied law with William Botsford. End set up practice at Saint John as an attorney, was called to the bar in 1825 and moved to Newcastle. He married Lucy Morse in 1827. In Gloucester County, he was clerk of the peace from 1827 to 1847 and registrar from 1837 to 1841. In 1841, End was named Queen's Counsel. Although he described himself as a supporter of the common people, he generally voted with the government in the legislative assembly. He was defeated in 1850 and elected again in 1854 after spending some time in the United States. His election in 1856 was overturned on appeal but he was reelected in 1857. End became the first clerk for Gloucester County after Confederation and later served as a stipendiary magistrate.

End died in a fire in his office at Bathurst, likely assassinated by a man whom he had sentenced to time in jail.
