= Bliss Botsford =

Canadian politician

Bliss Botsford (November 26, 1813 – April 5, 1890) was a lawyer, judge and political figure in the Province of New Brunswick, Canada. He represented Westmorland County in the Legislative Assembly of New Brunswick from 1851 to 1854, from 1856 to 1861 and from 1866 to 1870.

He was born in Sackville, New Brunswick, the son of William Botsford and Sarah Lowell Murray who was the daughter of William Hazen. He studied at King's College in Fredericton but did not receive a degree. Botsford then studied law with William End, was called to the bar in 1838 and set up practice at the Bend of Petitcodiac (incorporated as Moncton in 1855). In 1842, he married Jane Chapman.

Botsford was named mayor of Moncton in 1862 and promptly had the town's incorporation act repealed so that its municipal debt would be spread across the county. Moncton was later incorporated again in 1875 after becoming a major railway centre for the province.

Botsford was an opponent of Confederation. He served as speaker for the Legislative Assembly from 1867 to 1870 and as a member of the Executive Council of New Brunswick, was Surveyor General from April 5, 1865 to April 14, 1866.

In 1870, Bliss Botsford was named judge for the court for Westmorland and Albert counties. He was also a major in the county militia and an active Freemason.

Botsford died in Moncton at the age of 76 after collapsing while descending a flight of stairs and then falling out through a window.
