= George F. Hill =

Canadian politician

MLA for Charlotte County
- In office 1865 to 1866; 1879 to 1882; 1892 to 1908

Personal details
- Born: February 1832 Saint Stephen, New Brunswick
- Died: October 21, 1910 (aged 78) Saint Stephen, New Brunswick
- Party: Liberal Party of New Brunswick

George Frederick Hill (February 1832 – October 21, 1910) was a lawyer, merchant and political figure in New Brunswick. He represented Charlotte County in the Legislative Assembly of New Brunswick from 1865 to 1866, from 1879 to 1882 and from 1892 to 1908 as a Liberal member.

He was born in Saint Stephen, New Brunswick, the son of George Stilman Hill, who had previously served in the Legislative Assembly of New Brunswick. He studied law and was admitted to practice as an attorney in 1854. Hill entered business as a merchant later that same year. He opposed Confederation. He was the Official Assignee in bankruptcy for the county from 1869 to 1878. He was named to the Legislative Council in 1882. Hill was named speaker for the council in 1887. He remained a member of the council until it was abolished in 1892. He died in 1910.
