= Patrick G. Ryan =

Canadian politician

Patrick George Ryan (May 9, 1838 – October 21, 1906) was a leather manufacturer and political figure in New Brunswick, Canada. He represented Gloucester County in the Legislative Assembly of New Brunswick from 1876 to 1892 as a Liberal.

He was born in Bathurst, New Brunswick, the son of Irish immigrants, and educated there. Ryan served on the council for Caraquet and was also warden for Gloucester and a justice of the peace. In 1862, he married Margaret Murphy. He served on the province's Executive Council as Chief Commissioner of the Board of Works. He was first elected in an 1876 by-election held after Théotime Blanchard resigned his seat to become inspector of weights and measures.
