= John Herbert Crawford (politician) =

Canadian politician

John Herbert Crawford (November 2, 1843 – August 28, 1882) was a lawyer and political figure in New Brunswick, Canada. He represented King's County in the Legislative Assembly of New Brunswick from 1870 to 1882 as a Liberal member.

He was born in Hampton, New Brunswick, the son of George Crawford and Eliza Sederquest, and educated in Saint John. He studied law with George Otty, was called to the bar in 1868 and set up practice in Saint John. Crawford was named to the Executive Council in 1872 and became solicitor general in 1879. He also served as a lieutenant in the local militia.
