= George J. Colter =

Canadian politician

George Johnson Colter (1840 – November 17, 1915) was a farmer and political figure in New Brunswick, Canada. He represented York County in the Legislative Assembly of New Brunswick as a Liberal-Conservative member from 1878 to 1886.

He was born in Sheffield, New Brunswick, the son of Alexander Colter, of Irish descent. In 1875, he married Celia Slipp. Colter served on the province's Executive Council as Chief Commissioner of Public Works and President of the Provincial Board of Agriculture from 1882 to 1883.
