= John Glasier =

Canadian politician (1809–1894)

The Honourable John Glasier
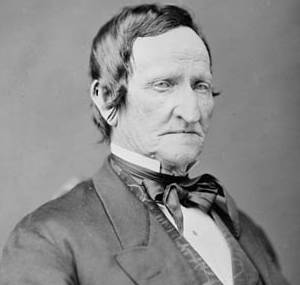

Senator for Sunbury, New Brunswick
- In office 1868–1894
- Appointed by: John A. Macdonald

Member of the Legislative Assembly of New Brunswick for Sunbury County
- In office 1861–1868

Personal details
- Born: September 3, 1809 Lincoln, New Brunswick
- Died: July 7, 1894 (aged 84)
- Party: Liberal

John Glasier (September 3, 1809 – July 7, 1894) was a Canadian lumberman and politician. His surname also appears as Glazier.

Born in Lincoln, New Brunswick, the son of Benjamin Glasier, he was elected to the Legislative Assembly of New Brunswick for Sunbury in the 1861 election. In 1842, he married Emmaline Garraty. A Liberal, he was re-elected in 1865. A supporter of Confederation, he was appointed to the Senate of Canada in 1868, representing the senatorial division of Sunbury, New Brunswick. He died in office of cholera in Ottawa in 1894.
