= George Luther Hatheway =

Canadian politician

3rd Premier of New Brunswick
- In office February 21, 1871 – July 5, 1872
- Monarch: Victoria
- Lieutenant Governor: Lemuel Allan Wilmot
- Preceded by: George E. King
- Succeeded by: George E. King

MLA for York
- In office June 18, 1850 – June 13, 1856 Serving with Thomas Pickard, Jr, Charles Fisher, Lemuel Allan Wilmot, Charles McPherson, James Taylor, John Campbell Allen
- Preceded by: Charles Fisher
- Succeeded by: John McIntosh
- In office June 4, 1861 – June 1, 1866 Serving with Charles Fisher, John James Fraser, Hiram Dow, William Hayden Needham, John Campbell Allen
- Preceded by: John McIntosh
- Succeeded by: Hiram Dow
- In office June 4, 1870 – July 5, 1872 Serving with Robert Robinson, Charles McPherson, John Adolphus Beckwith
- Preceded by: William Hayden Needham
- Succeeded by: John James Fraser

Personal details
- Born: August 4, 1813 Musquash, New Brunswick, Canada
- Died: July 5, 1872 (aged 58) Fredericton, New Brunswick, Canada
- Party: Conservative
- Spouse: Martha Slason (m. 1840)
- Occupation: Farmer, merchant, lumberman
- Profession: Politician

George Luther Hatheway (August 4, 1813 – July 5, 1872) was a politician in New Brunswick, Canada. His surname also appears as Hathaway.

He was born in Musquash, New Brunswick, the son of Calvin Luther Hatheway and Sarah Harrison.

He entered politics as a reformer and advocate of responsible government. Hatheway was a noted drinker, and often sipped brandy while campaigning. He was elected to the colony's legislative assembly in 1850, and re-elected in 1854 and 1856, but lost his seat in 1857. He returned to the house in 1861, and became chief commissioner of public works.

In 1865, Hatheway objected to the terms of Canadian Confederation and resigned from his government position when the terms were accepted by the government of Samuel Leonard Tilley. Hatheway's resignation helped defeat the government, and he was re-elected as an Anti-Confederate candidate later that year. He rejected Lieutenant Governor Arthur H. Gordon's invitation to form a new government. Hatheway instead became chief commissioner of public works in the government of Albert James Smith.

He did not run in the 1866 election won by the Confederation Party, but ran in 1870, three years after New Brunswick became a Canadian province. He was elected to the provincial legislature as a Conservative candidate. Party loyalties were weak during this period, however, and in February 1871, he helped depose the government of Conservative Premier George E. King, who was considered to be too close to the federal Conservative Party. Hatheway became the leader of a new Conservative government.

Hatheway's government passed the Common Schools Act which had been drawn up by his predecessor. The legislation implemented a single, tax supported public school system based on the principle of Separation of church and state that would have enacted direct taxation for education. He had run on this issue in the 1871 election and won. The school act called for "free, tax supported, non-sectarian schools" and was opposed both by opponents of direct taxation and by the Roman Catholic clergy who saw the bill as a threat to Catholic schools.

On June 25, 1872, Hatheway's hand was seriously injured when he jumped from a moving train. He died in Fredericton as a result of blood poisoning from this incident.
