= John Ambrose Street =

Canadian politician

John Ambrose Street, QC (September 22, 1795 – May 5, 1865) was a lawyer and political figure in New Brunswick. He represented Northumberland County in the Legislative Assembly of New Brunswick from 1833 to 1842 and from 1843 to 1856.

He was born in Burton, New Brunswick, the son of Samuel Denny Street and Abigail Freeman, and was educated there and in Fredericton. He studied law with his father and was called to the bar in 1817. Street lived in Newcastle from 1823 to 1845. He served as registrar of wills and deeds for Northumberland County and as a member of the county board of health. In 1823, he married Jane Isabella, the daughter of William Hubbard, who had represented Sunbury County in the provincial assembly. Street was first elected to the provincial assembly in an 1833 by-election held after Joseph Cunard resigned his seat. In 1837, he was named Queen's Counsel. He was defeated in the 1842 general election but was elected in an 1843 by-election held after the results of the election were challenged. In 1851, he became a member of the province's Executive Council as attorney general.

Street ran unsuccessfully for reelection in 1856, 1861 and 1865. He died in Saint John at the age of 69.

His brother George Frederick, also a lawyer, served as a judge and a member of the Legislative Council.
