= James Steadman (politician) =

Canadian politician (1818–1913)

- Born: March 27, 1818; Moncton, New Brunswick, Canada
- Died: May 16, 1913 (aged 95); Fredericton, New Brunswick
- Occupation: Politician
- Years active: 1844–1898
- Spouses: Julia Ann Beckwith (m. 1846; div. 1870) Emma Jean Turnbull (m. 1872)
- Children: 2
- Parents: William Steadman; Hannah Tatro Couch

James Steadman (March 27, 1818 – May 16, 1913) was a Canadian lawyer, judge and political figure in New Brunswick. He represented Westmorland in the Legislative Assembly of New Brunswick from 1854 to 1856 and from 1857 to 1865.

He was probably born in Moncton, the son of William Steadman and Hannah Tatro Couch. Steadman studied law and was called to the bar in 1844. He served in the Executive Council from 1860 to 1865 as Postmaster General. In 1860, he was Mayor of Moncton. Steadman practised in Moncton until 1866 when he moved to Fredericton. He was married twice: first to Julia Beckwith and then to Emma Jane Turnbull. In 1887, Steadman was named judge in the county court; he retired in 1898.

He died in Fredericton on May 16, 1913.
