= James Taylor (New Brunswick politician) =

Canadian politician

Member of the Legislative Assembly of New Brunswick
- In office 1833–1856
- Constituency: York

Personal details
- Born: c. 1794 Fredericton, New Brunswick
- Died: February 4, 1856 Fredericton, New Brunswick
- Spouse: Nancy Hatfield (m. 1829)
- Occupation: Businessman; political figure
- Known for: Timber, shipbuilding, banking, and milling enterprises

James Taylor (c. 1794 – February 4, 1856) was a businessman and political figure in New Brunswick. He represented York in the Legislative Assembly of New Brunswick from 1833 to 1856.

He was born in Fredericton, the son of James Taylor who was a native of Scotland. With his brothers William and John F., he entered the family business in timber, ship building and construction. In 1829, he married Nancy Hatfield, whose sister had married his brother William. Taylor was a director of the Nashwaak Mill and Manufacturing Company, later serving as president of its milling operations. He also was a founder of the Central Bank of New Brunswick and a director of the Fredericton branch of the Bank of British North America. Taylor also helped found the Fredericton Hotel and Stage Coach Company. He ran unsuccessfully for a seat in the New Brunswick assembly in 1830, but was declared elected in 1833 after he appealed the results of the by-election held in 1832 following the death of John Dow. Taylor served as paymaster and captain in the county militia. In 1840, he was named a justice of the peace and, in 1850, a customs controller. Taylor died in office in Fredericton.
