= Richard Sutton (Canadian politician) =

Canadian politician

Richard Sutton (ca 1815 – July 12, 1870) was an Irish-born political figure in New Brunswick, Canada. He represented Westmorland County in the Legislative Assembly of New Brunswick from 1854 to 1861 and 1865 to 1870.

He was born in Sutton, County Wexford and came to New Brunswick in 1829 to join his brother John. He married Mary Lowes in 1848. He served as deputy treasurer for the town of Newcastle, a justice of the peace and judge in the Court of Common Pleas. Sutton served in the province's Executive Council as Surveyor General from 1867 to 1869.
