= James Brown (New Brunswick politician) =

Canadian politician

James Brown (September 6, 1790 – April 18, 1870) was a Scottish-born farmer, educator and politician in New Brunswick. He represented Charlotte County in the Legislative Assembly of New Brunswick from 1830 to 1850, from 1854 to 1856 and from 1857 to 1861.

== Biography ==
He was born near Dundee, the son of James Brown and Janet Douglas, and was educated in Scotland. He immigrated to St. Andrews, New Brunswick in 1810. He bought land at nearby Tower Hill in Charlotte County. Brown farmed and taught school. In 1817, he married Sarah Sharman. He ran unsuccessfully for a seat in the provincial assembly in 1827. In 1838, he was named government supervisor for the road between Fredericton and St. Andrews. Brown married Catherine Gillespie (née Cameron) in 1842 after the death of his first wife.

In 1844, Brown, with Sylvester Zobieski Earle and John Gregory, was tasked with preparing a report describing the state of schools in the province. In 1854, he helped prepare another study which resulted in the creation of the University of New Brunswick to replace King's College at Fredericton. Brown was defeated in the 1850 general election but was then named to the province's Legislative Council. He resigned his seat on the council in 1854 and was elected to a seat in the legislative assembly. Brown served on the province's Executive Council as Surveyor General and then was a member of the Board of Works. He resigned in 1856, was reelected in 1857 and again served as Surveyor General.

He was also a minor poet, and cousin of Robert Burns. Some of his writings are housed at the Provincial Archives of New Brunswick.

After Brown was defeated in 1861, he was named an emigrant agent and went to Britain to promote immigration to the province. Brown was opposed to Confederation and ran unsuccessfully for a seat in the assembly in 1864. He died at his home at Tower Hill at the age of 79.
