= Charles Watters (politician) =

Canadian politician

Charles Watters (November 26, 1818 – August 7, 1891) was a lawyer, judge and political figure in New Brunswick. He represented Victoria County from 1856 to 1861, along with Sir Leonard Tilly, and the city of St. John from 1861 to 1865. He was the first Roman Catholic to occupy a seat in government in New Brunswick. He supported Canadian Confederation.

Charles Watters was born and was educated in Saint John, New Brunswick, the son of Thomas Watters and Eleanor Toole, both immigrants from Ireland. He studied law with William Johnston Ritchie and was called to the bar in 1847. He served as a member of the Executive Council and was solicitor general from 1857 to 1863.

On February 13, 1847 at the age of 28, Watters married Mary Ellen Doherty (1822 - 1859) in St. John, New Brunswick. They had seven children, four sons and two daughters, together before Mary Ellen died on July 29, 1859 at the age of 37. On April 20, 1862, at the age of 43, Watters married Malvina Wallace Priestley (1845 - 1902) in Fredericton, New Brunswick. They had eight children, five sons and three daughters, together.

Watters was named a county court judge in 1867 and judge in the vice admiralty court in 1876. Hon. Charles Watters died August 7, 1891 at the age of 72 in St. John, New Brunswick in his residence on the corner of Princess Street and Carmarthen Street.
