= Frederick P. Thompson =

Canadian politician (1846–1922)

Frederick Pemberton Thompson (February 17, 1846 – April 22, 1922) was a businessman and political figure in New Brunswick. He represented York County in the Legislative Assembly of New Brunswick as a Liberal member from 1878 to 1885 and again from 1899 to 1902 when he was called to the Senate of Canada and served until his death.

He was born in Douglas, New Brunswick, the son of Alexander Thompson, and was educated there and at Mount Allison Academy in Sackville. In 1876, he married Eliza Snowball. Thompson was a partner in a firm which manufactured agricultural implements. He served on the county council and was county warden for three years. He was named to the Legislative Council of New Brunswick in 1885 and served until 1891.
