= Edwin Arnold Vail =

Canadian politician

Edwin Arnold Vail (August 19, 1817 – July 31, 1885) was a medical doctor and political figure in the Province of New Brunswick, Canada. He represented Kings County in the Legislative Assembly of New Brunswick from 1857 to 1866, from 1870 to 1874 and from 1878 to 1885.

He was born in Sussex Vale, New Brunswick, the son of John Cougle Vail and Charlotte Hannah Arnold, and studied medicine in Edinburgh and Glasgow. He returned home and set up practice in King's County. He also served as surgeon for the local militia. In 1842, he married Frances Charlotte Cougle. Vail was an opponent of Confederation. He served as Speaker for the New Brunswick assembly from 1865 to 1866, when he was defeated in a general election. Vail was reelected in 1870 and again served as speaker from 1871 to 1874. He married Harriet Courtland Murphy in 1873 after the death of his first wife. He was defeated again in 1874 but reelected in 1878. Vail served as a minister without portfolio in the Executive Council from 1883 to 1885. He was president of the New Brunswick Medical Society from 1883 to 1884. In April 1885, Vail was named to the province's Legislative Council. He died a few months later in Sussex at the age of 67.

His brother William Berrian Vail served in the Nova Scotia assembly and the Canadian House of Commons.
