= George Kerr (New Brunswick politician) =

Canadian politician

George Kerr (born 1805) was a Scottish-born lawyer and politician in New Brunswick. He represented Northumberland County in the Legislative Assembly of New Brunswick from 1852 to 1870.

He was born in Kirkcudbright and educated there. In 1832, he was called to the bar. He married a Miss Abrams and then married Miss Swayne after the death of his first wife.
