= John Montgomery (shipbuilder) =

Canadian merchant, shipbuilder and political figure

John Montgomery (May 12, 1800 – January 9, 1867) was a merchant, shipbuilder and political figure in New Brunswick. He represented Restigouche in the Legislative Assembly of New Brunswick from 1847 to 1865.

He was born at Fox Point, Prince Edward Island, the son of Donald Montgomery, who represented Prince County in the assembly for the island, and Nancy Penman. Montgomery was educated there and moved to Dalhousie, New Brunswick, where he was one of the first settlers. He established a shipyard with his brother Hugh; the brothers also exported timber and fish. Montgomery married Elizabeth Hamilton in 1834. He was a justice of the peace, a justice for the Inferior Court of Common Pleas, a school board trustee and an officer in the militia, as well as holding various other offices. Montgomery was a member of the Executive Council from 1843 to 1846 and again from 1853 to 1854 and served as surveyor general from 1856 to 1857. A supporter of union with Canada, he was defeated in the 1865 general election. He died in Dalhousie at the age of 66.

His son William also served in the provincial assembly and his grandson William Scott Montgomery served as the first mayor of Dalhousie.
