= Robert Duncan Wilmot =

Canadian Father of Confederation (1809–1891)

The Honourable Robert Duncan Wilmot PC
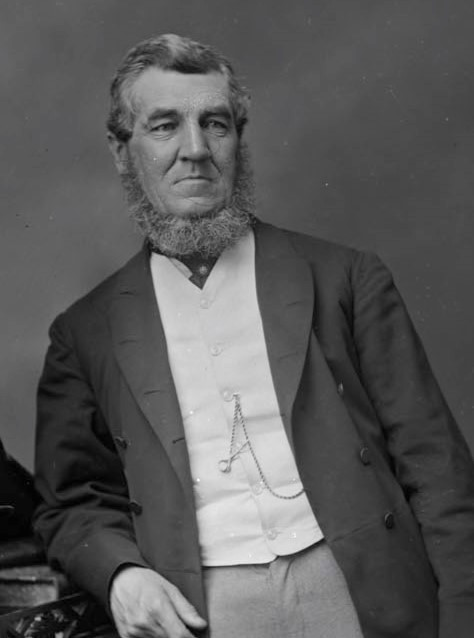
- Wilmot in May 1868

Senator for New Brunswick
- In office 23 October 1867 – 10 February 1880
- Appointed by: Royal Proclamation

6th Lieutenant Governor of New Brunswick
- In office 11 February 1880 – 10 November 1885
- Monarch: Victoria
- Governors General: Marquess of Lorne; The Marquess of Lansdowne
- Premier: John James Fraser; Daniel Lionel Hanington; Andrew George Blair
- Preceded by: Edward Barron Chandler
- Succeeded by: Samuel Leonard Tilley

16th Mayor of Saint John, New Brunswick
- In office 1849–1850
- Preceded by: William H. Street
- Succeeded by: Henry Chubb

Personal details
- Born: 16 October 1809 Fredericton, New Brunswick
- Died: 13 February 1891 (aged 81) Sunbury County, New Brunswick
- Party: Conservative
- Spouse: Susan Elizabeth Mowat
- Relations: John McNeil Wilmot (father)
- Children: John David Wilmot; Robert Duncan Wilmot Jr. Charlotte Gertrude Wilmot; Susan Harriet Wilmot; Henry Wilmot; Edward Ashley Wilmot; Elizabeth Blanche Wilmot
- Occupation: A Father of Confederation

Robert Duncan Wilmot, PC (16 October 1809 – 13 February 1891) was a Canadian politician and a Father of Confederation.

== Early life and family ==
Wilmot was born in Fredericton, New Brunswick on 16 October 1809. He was the son of John McNeil and Susanna (Susan) Harriet (born Wiggins) Wilmot. He moved to Saint John with his family at around the age of five, and there he was educated. In 1833 he married Susannah (Susan) Elizabeth Mowat of St Andrews. His father, John McNeil Wilmot, was a big tank and ship owner. Wilmot worked for his father's business and represented the company in Liverpool, England from 1835 to 1840. It is there that his son, Robert Duncan Wilmot, Jr., a future Member of Parliament, was born.

== Political career ==
=== New Brunswick ===
Wilmot served as mayor of Saint John from 1849 to 1850. He represented Saint John County in the Legislative Assembly of New Brunswick from 1847 to 1861, and from 1865 to 1867, and was member of the Executive Council of New Brunswick, serving as the Surveyor-General from 1851 to 1854, and provincial secretary from 1856 to 1857.

He was a New Brunswick delegate to the London Conference of 1866, which settled the final terms for Canadian Confederation.

=== Federal politics ===
Following Confederation, he was appointed to the Senate of Canada on 23 October 1867 by royal proclamation, and represented the Senate division of New Brunswick. In 1878, he became Speaker of the Senate, and was also a member of the ministry of John A. Macdonald.

=== Lieutenant Governor of New Brunswick ===
Wilmot resigned from the Senate on 10 February 1880 and was appointed the sixth Lieutenant Governor of New Brunswick. He served in that position until 1885.

== Death ==
Wilmot died at his estate in Sunbury County at the age of 81. His home was designated a National Historic Site of Canada in 1975. He is buried in Sunbury County Oromocto Anglican Church cemetery on Broad Road.
