= Westmorland (provincial electoral district) =

Defunct provincial electoral district in New Brunswick, Canada

New Brunswick electoral district

Defunct provincial electoral district
- Legislature: Legislative Assembly of New Brunswick
- District created: 1785
- District abolished: 1973
- First contested: 1785
- Last contested: 1970

Westmorland was a provincial electoral district for the Legislative Assembly of New Brunswick, Canada. It used a bloc voting system to elect candidates. It was abolished with the 1973 electoral redistribution, when the province moved to single-member ridings.

== Members of the Legislative Assembly ==
Legislature	Years	Member	Party	Member	Party	Member	Party	Member	Party
1st	1786 – 1792	Amos Botsford	Ind.	Charles Dixon	Ind.	Samuel Gay	Ind.	Andrew Kinnear	Ind.
2nd	1793 – 1795	Amos Botsford	Ind.	Thomas Chandler	Ind.	William Black	Ind.	Thomas Dixson	Ind.
3rd	1795 – 1802	Amos Botsford	Ind.	Samuel Gay	Ind.	Ralph Siddall	Ind.	Thomas Dixson	Ind.
4th	1802 – 1809	Amos Botsford	Ind.	Benjamin Wilson	Ind.	James Easterbrooks	Ind.		
5th	1809 – 1812	Amos Botsford	Ind.	Titus Knapp	Ind.	James Easterbrooks	Ind.	John Chapman	Ind.
5th	1813 – 1816	William Botsford	Ind.	Titus Knapp	Ind.	James Easterbrooks	Ind.	John Chapman	Ind.
6th	1817 – 1819	William Botsford	Ind.	Rufus Smith	Ind.	James Easterbrooks	Ind.	John Chapman	Ind.
7th	1820	William Botsford	Ind.	Rufus Smith	Ind.	James Easterbrooks	Ind.	Joseph Crandall	Ind.
8th	1821 – 1823	William Botsford	Ind.	Rufus Smith	Ind.	Benjamin Wilson	Ind.	Joseph Crandall	Ind.
8th	1823 – 1824	William Botsford	Ind.	Rufus Smith	Ind.	Benjamin Wilson	Ind.	Malcolm Wilmot	Ind.
8th	1824 – 1827	William Crane	Ind.	Rufus Smith	Ind.	Benjamin Wilson	Ind.	Malcolm Wilmot	Ind.
9th	1827 – 1830	William Crane	Ind.	Edward Barron Chandler	Ind.	Philip Palmer	Ind.	Robert Scott	Ind.
10th	1831 – 1834	William Crane	Ind.	Edward Barron Chandler	Ind.	Rufus Smith	Ind.	Robert Scott	Ind.
11th	1835 – 1837	William Crane	Ind.	Edward Barron Chandler	Ind.	Philip Palmer	Ind.	Daniel Hanington	Ind.
12th	1837 – 1842	William Crane	Ind.	William Wilson	Ind.	Philip Palmer	Ind.	Daniel Hanington	Ind.
13th	1843 – 1846	William Hazen Botsford	Ind.	John Smith	Ind.	Philip Palmer	Ind.	Daniel Hanington	Ind.
14th	1847 – 1850	William Hazen Botsford	Ind.	William Wilson	Ind.	Amand Landry	Ind.	Daniel Hanington	Ind.
15th	1851 – 1853	William Crane	Ind.	Bliss Botsford	Ind.	Robert B. Chapman	Ind.	Daniel Hanington	Ind.
15th	1853 – 1854	Amand Landry	Ind.	Bliss Botsford	Ind.	Robert B. Chapman	Ind.	Daniel Hanington	Ind.
16th	1854 – 1856	Amand Landry	Ind.	Albert James Smith	Lib.	James Steadman	Ind.	Daniel Hanington	Ind.
17th	1856 – 1857	Amand Landry	Ind.	Albert James Smith	Lib.	Bliss Botsford	Ind.	Robert K. Gilbert	Ind.
18th	1857 – 1861	James Steadman	Ind.	Albert James Smith	Lib.	Bliss Botsford	Ind.	Robert K. Gilbert	Ind.
19th	1862 – 1865	James Steadman	Ind.	Albert James Smith	Lib.	Amand Landry	Ind.	William J. Gilbert	Ind.
20th	1865 – 1866	Bliss Botsford	Ind.	Albert James Smith	Lib.	Amand Landry	Ind.	William J. Gilbert	Ind.
21st	1866 – 1867	Bliss Botsford	Ind.	Albert James Smith	Lib.	Amand Landry	Ind.	Angus McQueen	Ind.
21st	1867 – 1870	Bliss Botsford	Ind.	Joseph Lytle Moore	Ind.	Amand Landry	Ind.	Angus McQueen	Ind.
22nd	1870 – 1871	Bliss Botsford	Ind.	Joseph Lytle Moore	Ind.	Pierre-Amand Landry	Cons.	Angus McQueen	Ind.
22nd	1871 – 1874	Daniel Lionel Hanington	Lib.-Con.	John A. Humphrey	Lib.-Con.	Pierre-Amand Landry	Cons.	Angus McQueen	Ind.
23rd	1875 – 1878	Edward J. Smith	Lib.	John A. Humphrey	Lib.-Con.	Thomas Pickard	Lib.	Angus McQueen	Ind.
24th	1879 – 1882	Daniel Lionel Hanington	Lib.-Con.	Amasa E. Killam	Lib.-Con.	Pierre-Amand Landry	Cons.	Joseph Laurence Black	Ind.
25th	1882 – 1883	Daniel Lionel Hanington	Lib.-Con.	John A. Humphrey	Lib.-Con.	Pierre-Amand Landry	Cons.	Charles A. Black	Cons.
25th	1883 – 1886	Daniel Lionel Hanington	Lib.-Con.	John A. Humphrey	Lib.-Con.	Amasa E. Killam	Lib.-Con.	Charles A. Black	Cons.
26th	1886 – 1890	Daniel Lionel Hanington	Lib.-Con.	John A. Humphrey	Lib.-Con.	Amasa E. Killam	Lib.-Con.	Joseph Laurence Black	Ind.
27th	1890 – 1891	Daniel Lionel Hanington	Lib.-Con.	Henry Absalom Powell	Lib.-Con.	Olivier-Maximin Melanson	Lib.-Con.	Henry T. Stevens	Ind.
27th	1891 – 1892	Daniel Lionel Hanington	Lib.-Con.	Henry Absalom Powell	Lib.-Con.	Olivier-Maximin Melanson	Lib.-Con.	Joseph A. McQueen	Lib.
28th	1892 – 1895	John W. Y. Smith	Ind.	Henry Absalom Powell	Lib.-Con.	Amasa E. Killam	Lib.-Con.	W. Woodbury Wells	Lib.
29th	1896 – 1897	Ambrose D. Richard	Cons.	Frederick W. Sumner	Cons.	Amasa E. Killam	Lib.-Con.	W. Woodbury Wells	Lib.
29th	1897 – 1899	Ambrose D. Richard	Cons.	Frederick W. Sumner	Cons.	Clifford William Robinson	Lib.	W. Woodbury Wells	Lib.
30th	1899 – 1901	William F. Humphrey	Ind.	Olivier-Maximin Melanson	Lib.-Con.	Clifford William Robinson	Lib.	W. Woodbury Wells	Lib.
30th	1901 – 1903	William F. Humphrey	Ind.	Olivier-Maximin Melanson	Lib.-Con.	Clifford William Robinson	Lib.	Arthur Bliss Copp	Lib.
31st	1903 – 1908	Francis J. Sweeney	Lib.	Clement M. Leger	Lib.	Clifford William Robinson	Lib.	Arthur Bliss Copp	Lib.
32nd	1908 – 1912	Francis J. Sweeney	Lib.	Clement M. Leger	Lib.	Clifford William Robinson	Lib.	Arthur Bliss Copp	Lib.
33rd	1912 – 1916	William F. Humphrey	Ind.	Frank Bunting Black	Cons.	Olivier-Maximin Melanson	Lib.-Con.	Patrick G. Mahoney	Ind.
33rd	1916 – 1917	William F. Humphrey	Ind.	Frank Bunting Black	Cons.	Olivier-Maximin Melanson	Lib.-Con.	Ernest A. Smith	Lib.
34th	1917 – 1920	Francis J. Sweeney	Lib.	Clement M. Leger	Lib.	Fred Magee	Lib.	Ernest A. Smith	Lib.
35th	1921 – 1925	Frederick L. Estabrooks	Lib.	A. Chase Fawcett	UF	Fred Magee	Lib.	Reid McManus	Lib.
36th	1925 – 1930	Merville A. Oulton	Cons.	Antoine Joseph Léger	Cons.	Herbert M. Wood	Cons.	Medley G. Siddall	Cons.
37th	1930	Merville A. Oulton	Cons.	Antoine Joseph Léger	Cons.	Herbert M. Wood	Cons.	Medley G. Siddall	Cons.
37th	1931 – 1935	Lewis Smith	Cons.	Antoine Joseph Léger	Cons.	Herbert M. Wood	Cons.	Medley G. Siddall	Cons.
38th	1935 – 1939	Austin Claude Taylor	Lib.	Frank Copp	Lib.	E. R. McDonald	Lib.	Simeon Melanson	Lib.
39th	1939 – 1944	Austin Claude Taylor	Lib.	Frank Copp	Lib.	Édouard S. Léger	Lib.	A. W. McQueen	Lib.
40th	1944 – 1948	Austin Claude Taylor	Lib.	Frank Copp	Lib.	Édouard S. Léger	Lib.	L. C. Dysart	Lib.
41st	1948 – 1952	Austin Claude Taylor	Lib.	Frank Copp	Lib.	Édouard S. Léger	Lib.	L. C. Dysart	Lib.
42nd	1952 – 1956	Austin Claude Taylor	Lib.	Donald C. Harper	Lib.	Joseph E. LeBlanc	Lib.	Cléophas Léger	Lib.
43rd	1957 – 1960	Austin Claude Taylor	Lib.	Donald C. Harper	Lib.	Joseph E. LeBlanc	Lib.	Cléophas Léger	Lib.
44th	1960 – 1963	Percy Mitton	Lib.	Donald C. Harper	Lib.	Joseph E. LeBlanc	Lib.	Cléophas Léger	Lib.
45th	1963 – 1965	Percy Mitton	Lib.	Donald C. Harper	Lib.	Joseph E. LeBlanc	Lib.	Cléophas Léger	Lib.
45th	1965 – 1967	Percy Mitton	Lib.	W. Wynn Meldrum	Lib.	Joseph E. LeBlanc	Lib.	Cléophas Léger	Lib.
46th	1967 – 1970	Percy Mitton	Lib.	W. Wynn Meldrum	Lib.	Joseph E. LeBlanc	Lib.	Cléophas Léger	Lib.
47th	1970 – 1974	William J. McNevin	Lib.	W. Wynn Meldrum	Lib.	Joseph E. LeBlanc	Lib.	Cléophas Léger	Lib.
Riding dissolved into Memramcook, Petitcodiac, Shediac and Tantramar

== Election results ==
1970 New Brunswick general election
Party	Candidate	Votes	%	Elected
Liberal	Joseph E. Leblanc	10,683	13.10	✓
Liberal	Wendell W. Meldrum	10,495	12.87	✓
Liberal	William J. McNevin	10,284	12.61	✓
Liberal	J. Cléophas Léger	10,141	12.43	✓
Progressive Conservative	Frank K. Wortman	9,516	11.67	
Progressive Conservative	William Sloan	9,316	11.42	
Progressive Conservative	Max Gordon	9,143	11.21	
Progressive Conservative	Alfred Leger	8,713	10.68	
New Democratic	Colin McCabe	1,188	1.46	
New Democratic	Beatrice Boudreau	1,110	1.36	
New Democratic	Kevin Noon	982	1.20	
Total number of valid votes		81,571	100.00	
Number of electors who cast votes/Turnout		22,326	82.03	
Eligible voters		27,216		

1967 New Brunswick general election
Party	Candidate	Votes	%	Elected
Liberal	W. W. Meldrum	11,785	15.00	✓
Liberal	Joseph E. Leblanc	11,656	14.84	✓
Liberal	Percy Mitton	11,346	14.44	✓
Liberal	J. Cléophas Léger	11,314	14.40	✓
Progressive Conservative	Frank Wortman	8,476	10.79	
Progressive Conservative	Mark Yeoman	8,243	10.49	
Progressive Conservative	Leopold Leger	7,952	10.12	
Progressive Conservative	George Cormier	7,780	9.90	
Total number of valid votes		78,552	100.00	

New Brunswick provincial by-election, 27 September 1965 Death of Donald C. Harper
Party	Candidate	Votes	%	Elected
Liberal	Wendell W. Meldrum	10,570	66.24	✓
Progressive Conservative	Robert V. Landry	5,388	33.76	
Total number of valid votes		15,958		

1963 New Brunswick general election
Party	Candidate	Votes	%	Elected
Liberal	Donald C. Harper	11,284	14.18	✓
Liberal	Percy Mitton	11,195	14.07	✓
Liberal	Joseph E. Leblanc	11,083	13.93	✓
Liberal	Joseph C. Léger	11,072	13.92	✓
Progressive Conservative	Frank Lutes	8,779	11.04	
Progressive Conservative	Harvey Hicks	8,770	11.02	
Progressive Conservative	Louis Landry	8,699	10.93	
Progressive Conservative	Sylvain Léger	8,672	10.90	
Total number of valid votes		79,554		

1960 New Brunswick general election
Party	Candidate	Votes	%	Elected
Liberal	Donald C. Harper	11,889	14.16	✓
Liberal	Percy Mitton	11,832	14.09	✓
Liberal	Joseph E. Leblanc	11,811	14.07	✓
Liberal	Joseph C. Léger	11,759	14.00	✓
Progressive Conservative	James Henderson	9,269	11.04	
Progressive Conservative	Harvey Hicks	9,213	10.97	
Progressive Conservative	Louis Landry	9,138	10.88	
Progressive Conservative	Régis LeBlanc	9,060	10.79	
Total number of valid votes		83,971		

1956 New Brunswick general election
Party	Candidate	Votes	%	Elected
Liberal	Austin C. Taylor	11,159	13.84	✓
Liberal	Joseph E. Leblanc	11,012	13.66	✓
Liberal	Joseph C. Léger	11,005	13.65	✓
Liberal	Donald C. Harper	10,962	13.60	✓
Progressive Conservative	Aurèle Young	9,147	11.35	
Progressive Conservative	Howard Trueman	9,132	11.33	
Progressive Conservative	Louis Landry	9,128	11.32	
Progressive Conservative	Roy Beckwith	9,069	11.25	
Total number of valid votes		80,614		

1952 New Brunswick general election
Party	Candidate	Votes	%	Elected
Liberal	Austin C. Taylor	11,829	13.72	✓
Liberal	Donald C. Harper	11,569	13.42	✓
Liberal	Joseph E. Leblanc	11,487	13.33	✓
Liberal	Joseph C. Léger	11,375	13.20	✓
Progressive Conservative	Robert S. Black	8,998	10.44	
Progressive Conservative	Aurèle Young	8,763	10.17	
Progressive Conservative	Roy Beckwith	8,755	10.16	
Progressive Conservative	George Belliveau	8,472	9.83	
Co-operative Commonwealth	Percy Mitton	1,274	1.48	
Co-operative Commonwealth	Claude P. Milton	1,259	1.46	
Co-operative Commonwealth	George A. Wilson	1,259	1.44	
Co-operative Commonwealth	Joseph O. LeBlanc	1,182	1.37	
Total number of valid votes		86,204		

1948 New Brunswick general election
Party	Candidate	Votes	%	Elected
Liberal	Austin C. Taylor	13,203	16.91	✓
Liberal	Frank H. Copp	12,895	16.52	✓
Liberal	Langton C. Dysart	12,794	16.39	✓
Liberal	Edouard S. Léger	12,647	16.20	✓
Conservative	J. Lawrence Black	5,143	6.59	
Conservative	Percy J. Eagles	5,136	6.58	
Conservative	Ambrose Léger	4,832	6.19	
Conservative	M. J. Esliger	4,812	6.16	
Co-operative Commonwealth	Percy Mitton	2,261	2.90	
Co-operative Commonwealth	Gordon Wilson	2,208	2.83	
Co-operative Commonwealth	Joseph Breau	2,127	2.72	
Total number of valid votes		78,058		

1944 New Brunswick general election
Party	Candidate	Votes	%	Elected
Liberal	Austin C. Taylor	9,465	13.02	✓
Liberal	Frank H. Copp	9,148	12.59	✓
Liberal	Langton C. Dysart	9,076	12.49	✓
Liberal	Edouard S. Léger	8,913	12.26	✓
Conservative	Charles Cass	6,493	8.93	
Conservative	Carl C. Allen	6,323	8.70	
Conservative	William H. Humphrey	6,313	8.69	
Conservative	Eloi J. Léger	5,949	8.18	
Co-operative Commonwealth	R. J. Caldwell	2,840	3.91	
Co-operative Commonwealth	Edward R. McDonald	2,740	3.77	
Co-operative Commonwealth	G. W. R. Myles	2,740	3.77	
Co-operative Commonwealth	P. A. Bannister	2,685	3.69	
Total number of valid votes		72,685		

1939 New Brunswick general election
Party	Candidate	Votes	%	Elected
Liberal	Austin C. Taylor	9,999	14.85	✓
Liberal	Frank H. Copp	9,692	14.39	✓
Liberal	Alexander W. McQueen	9,725	14.44	✓
Liberal	Edouard S. Léger	9,593	14.25	✓
Conservative	Carl C. Allen	7,132	10.59	
Conservative	Emmerson C. Rice	7,104	10.55	
Conservative	Medley G. Siddall	7,096	10.54	
Conservative	Ferdinand J. Robidoux	6,992	10.38	
Total number of valid votes		67,333		

1935 New Brunswick general election
Party	Candidate	Votes	%	Elected
Liberal	Austin C. Taylor	10,558	15.49	✓
Liberal	Frank H. Copp	10,491	15.39	✓
Liberal	Edward McDonald	10,418	15.28	✓
Liberal	Siméon Melanson	10,230	15.01	✓
Conservative	William Humphrey	6,807	9.98	
Conservative	Herbert M. Wood	6,719	9.68	
Conservative	Medley G. Siddall	6,625	9.72	
Conservative	Antoine J. Léger	6,327	9.28	
Total number of valid votes		68,178		

New Brunswick provincial by-election, 7 October 1930 Resignation of Merville A. Oulton
Party	Candidate	Votes	Elected
Conservative	Lewis Smith	Acclaimed	✓

1930 New Brunswick general election
Party	Candidate	Votes	%	Elected
Conservative	Herbert M. Wood	7,156	12.98	✓
Conservative	Merville A. Oulton	7,060	12.81	✓
Conservative	Medley G. Siddall	7,051	12.79	✓
Conservative	Antoine J. Léger	6,927	12.57	✓
Liberal	Austin C. Taylor	6,841	12.41	
Liberal	William C. Rayworth	6,819	12.37	
Liberal	Reid McManus	6,671	12.10	
Liberal	Alphonse T. LeBlanc	6,603	11.98	
Total number of valid votes		54,896		

New Brunswick provincial by-election, 26 September 1925 Upon Antoine J. Léger being appointed to cabinet
Party	Candidate	Votes	Elected
Conservative	Antoine J. Léger	Acclaimed	✓

1925 New Brunswick general election
Party	Candidate	Votes	%	Elected
Conservative	Herbert Wood	6,690	13.11	✓
Conservative	Merville Oulton	6,662	13.06	✓
Conservative	Medley Siddall	6,572	12.88	✓
Conservative	Antoine Léger	6,486	12.71	✓
Liberal	Fred Magee	6,224	12.20	
Liberal	Ferdinand Bourgeois	6,147	12.05	
Liberal	Reid McManus	6,140	12.03	
Liberal	Fred Estabrooks	6,109	11.97	
Total number of valid votes		51,030		

1920 New Brunswick general election
Party	Candidate	Votes	%	Elected
Liberal	Fred Magee	4,875	13.30	✓
Liberal	Fred Estabrooks	4,707	12.84	✓
United Farmers	Albert Fawcett	4,648	12.68	✓
Liberal	Reid McManus	4,645	12.67	✓
Liberal	Ferdinand Bourgeois	4,515	12.31	
United Farmers	Arthur Robinson	4,513	12.31	
United Farmers	Frank Reilly	4,412	12.12	
United Farmers	Matthias Arsenault	4,319	11.78	
Total number of valid votes		36,664		

New Brunswick provincial by-election, 23 April 1917 Upon Ernest A. Smith being appointed to cabinet
Party	Candidate	Votes	Elected
Liberal	Ernest A. Smith	Acclaimed	✓

1917 New Brunswick general election
Party	Candidate	Votes	%	Elected
Liberal	Ernest Smith	3,585	13.84	✓
Liberal	Fred Magee	3,583	13.84	✓
Liberal	Frank Sweeney	3,491	13.48	✓
Liberal	Clément Léger	3,487	13.47	✓
Conservative	Albert Trites	2,981	11.51	
Conservative	Frank Black	2,980	11.51	
Conservative	Patrick Mahoney	2,919	11.27	
Conservative	Antoine Léger	2,868	11.08	
Total number of valid votes		36,664		

New Brunswick provincial by-election, 30 May 1916 Upon Patrick G. Mahoney being appointed to cabinet
Party	Candidate	Votes	%	Elected
Liberal	Ernest A. Smith	3,190	50.55	✓
Conservative	Patrick Mahoney	3,121	49.45	
Total number of valid votes		6,311		

1912 New Brunswick general election
Party	Candidate	Votes	%	Elected
Conservative	Frank Black	3,550	13.67	✓
Conservative	Patrick Mahoney	3,539	13.63	✓
Conservative	William Humphrey	3,501	13.49	✓
Conservative	Oliver Melanson	3,436	13.23	✓
Liberal	Arthur Copp	3,045	11.73	
Liberal	Fred Magee	2,992	11.52	
Liberal	I. Newton Killam	2,976	11.46	
Liberal	Clément Léger	2,923	11.26	
Total number of valid votes		25,962		

1908 New Brunswick general election
Party	Candidate	Votes	%	Elected
Liberal	Clifford Robinson	4,469	13.60	✓
Liberal	Arthur Copp	4,364	13.28	✓
Liberal	Frank Sweeney	4,352	13.24	✓
Liberal	Clément Léger	4,217	12.83	✓
Conservative	Frederick Sumner	3,925	11.94	
Conservative	Frank Black	3,892	11.84	
Conservative	Patrick Mahoney	3,851	11.72	
Conservative	Oliver Melanson	3,790	11.53	
Total number of valid votes		32,860		

1903 New Brunswick general election
Party	Candidate	Votes	%	Elected
Liberal	Arthur Copp	4,151	14.10	✓
Liberal	Clifford Robinson	4,138	14.05	✓
Liberal	Francis Sweeney	4,026	13.67	✓
Liberal	Clément Léger	3,949	13.41	✓
Conservative	William Humphrey	3,601	12.23	
Conservative	Frank Black	3,545	12.04	
Conservative	Oliver Melanson	3,523	11.96	
Conservative	Patrick Mahoney	2,515	8.54	
Total number of valid votes		29,448		

1899 New Brunswick general election
Party	Candidate	Votes	%	Elected
Independent	William Humphrey	4,097	12.81	✓
Liberal	Clifford Robinson	4,064	12.71	✓
Liberal–Conservative	Oliver Melanson	4,038	12.63	✓
Liberal	William Wells	4,022	12.58	✓
Unknown	Frank Black	3,986	12.47	
Unknown	Frederick Sumner	3,985	12.46	
Unknown	Ambroise Richard	3,922	12.27	
Unknown	Arthur Copp	3,857	12.06	
Total number of valid votes		31,971		

1895 New Brunswick general election
Party	Candidate	Votes	Elected
Liberal–Conservative	Amasa Killam	Acclaimed	✓
Conservative	Ambroise Richard	Acclaimed	✓
Conservative	Frederick Sumner	Acclaimed	✓
Liberal	William Wells	Acclaimed	✓

1892 New Brunswick general election
Party	Candidate	Votes	%	Elected
Independent	John Smith	3,492	13.13	✓
Liberal–Conservative	Amasa Killam	3,463	13.02	✓
Liberal–Conservative	Henry Powell	3,367	12.66	✓
Liberal	William Wells	3,321	12.48	✓
Unknown	Ambroise Richard	3,317	12.47	
Unknown	William Wells	3,254	12.23	
Unknown	Frederick Sumner	3,240	12.18	
Unknown	Oliver Melanson	3,147	11.83	
Total number of valid votes		26,601		

1890 New Brunswick general election
Party	Candidate	Votes	%	Elected
Liberal–Conservative	Oliver Melanson	4,338	22.77	✓
Liberal–Conservative	Henry Powell	3,235	16.98	✓
Independent	Henry Stevens	3,079	16.16	✓
Liberal–Conservative	Daniel Hanington	3,037	15.94	✓
Unknown	Amasa Killam	2,687	14.10	
Unknown	Josiah Anderson	2,675	14.04	
Total number of valid votes		19,051		

1886 New Brunswick general election
Party	Candidate	Votes	%	Elected
Independent	Joseph Black	2,678	13.22	✓
Liberal–Conservative	Amasa Killam	2,658	13.12	✓
Liberal–Conservative	Daniel Hanington	2,654	13.10	✓
Liberal–Conservative	John Humphrey	2,593	12.80	✓
Unknown	Edward J. Smith	2,588	12.78	
Unknown	E. Gaudet	2,573	12.70	
Unknown	William Robinson	2,415	11.92	
Unknown	Tilman Landry	2,096	10.35	
Total number of valid votes		20,255		

1882 New Brunswick general election
Party	Candidate	Votes	%	Elected
Conservative	Pierre Landry	2,743	19.22	✓
Conservative	Charles Black	2,585	18.12	✓
Liberal–Conservative	Daniel Hanington	2,545	17.84	✓
Liberal–Conservative	John Humphrey	2,544	17.83	✓
Unknown	Amasa Killam	2,023	14.18	
Unknown	Angus McQueen	1,829	12.82	
Total number of valid votes		14,269		

1878 New Brunswick general election
Party	Candidate	Votes	%	Elected
Liberal–Conservative	Amasa Killam	2,766	15.27	✓
Independent	Joseph Black	2,738	15.12	✓
Conservative	Pierre Landry	2,737	15.11	✓
Liberal–Conservative	Daniel Hanington	2,710	14.96	✓
Unknown	Josiah Wood	1,922	10.61	
Unknown	Angus McQueen	1,880	10.38	
Unknown	John Humphrey	1,788	9.87	
Unknown	John McKenzie	1,568	8.66	
Total number of valid votes		18,109		

1874 New Brunswick general election
Party	Candidate	Votes	%	Elected
Liberal	Edward Smith	2,024	13.78	✓
Independent	Angus McQueen	1,989	13.54	✓
Liberal–Conservative	John Humphrey	1,953	13.30	✓
Liberal	Thomas Pickard	1,912	13.02	✓
Unknown	Daniel Hanington	1,789	12.18	
Unknown	Pierre Landry	1,709	11.64	
Unknown	Titus Hicks	1,657	11.28	
Unknown	John McKenzie	1,654	11.26	
Total number of valid votes		14,687		

== See also ==
- List of New Brunswick provincial electoral districts
- Canadian provincial electoral districts
