= List of premiers of New Brunswick =

The Canadian province of New Brunswick was a British crown colony before it joined Canada in 1867. It had a system of responsible government beginning in 1854, and has kept its own legislature to deal with provincial matters. New Brunswick has a unicameral Westminster-style parliamentary government, in which the premier is the leader of the party that has the confidence of the Legislative Assembly to form a government. The premier is New Brunswick's head of government, and the king of Canada is its head of state and is represented by the lieutenant governor of New Brunswick. The premier picks a cabinet from the elected members to form the Executive Council of New Brunswick, and presides over that body.

Members are first elected to the legislature during general elections. General elections must be conducted every five years from the date of the last election, but the premier may ask for early dissolution of the Legislative Assembly. An election may also take place if the governing party loses the confidence of the legislature by the defeat of a supply bill or tabling of a confidence motion.

New Brunswick has had 37 individuals serve as first minister. The province had five individuals as leaders while a colony, and 32 individuals after Canadian Confederation, of which two were from the Confederation Party, 11 from the Progressive Conservative Party of New Brunswick, 16 from the New Brunswick Liberal Association, one from the Anti-Confederation Party, and seven with unofficial party affiliations.

== Premiers of New Brunswick ==
No.	Portrait	Name (Birth–Death)	Term of office	Electoral mandates (Assembly)	Political party	Parliamentary seat	Ref.
Leader of the Government of the Colony of New Brunswick (1854–1867)
1 (1 of 2)		Charles Fisher (1808–1880)	1 November 1854 – May; 1856	1854 election (16th Leg.)	Non-partisan	MLA for York	
2		John Hamilton Gray (1814–1889)	21 June 1856 – June; 1857	1856 election (17th Leg.)	Non-partisan	MLA for Saint John County	
3 (2 of 2)		Charles Fisher (1808–1880)	1 June 1857 – 19 March 1861	1857 election (18th Leg.)	Non-partisan	MLA for York	
4		Samuel Leonard Tilley (1818–1896)	19 March 1861 – March; 1865	Appointment (18th Leg.) 1861 election (19th Leg.)	Non-partisan	MLA for Saint John City	
5		Albert James Smith (1822–1883)	21 September 1865 – 14 April 1866	1865 election (20th Leg.)	Anti-Confederation	MLA for Westmorland	
6		Peter Mitchell (1824–1899)	14 April 1866 – August; 1867	Appointment (20th Leg.) 1866 election (21st Leg.)	Confederation (Ldr. 1866)	Legislative Councillor for colony at-large	
Premiers of the province of New Brunswick since Confederation (1867–present)
1		Andrew R. Wetmore (1820–1892)	16 August 1867 – 25 May 1870	Appointment (21st Leg.)	Confederation (Ldr. 1867)	MLA for Saint John City	
2* (1 of 2)		George E. King (1839–1901)	9 June 1870 – 21 February 1871	Appointment (21st Leg.) 1870 election (22nd Leg.)	Conservative (Ldr. 1870)	MLA for Saint John County	
3		George L. Hathaway (1813–1872)	21 February 1871 – 5 July 1872	Appointment (22nd Leg.)	Conservative (Ldr. 1871)	MLA for York	
4* (2 of 2)		George E. King (1839–1901)	5 July 1872 – 3 May 1878	Appointment (22nd Leg.) 1874 election (23rd Leg.)	Conservative (Ldr. 1872)	MLA for Saint John County	
5		John James Fraser (1829–1896)	June; 1878 – 25 May 1882	1878 election (24th Leg.)	Conservative (Ldr. 1878)	MLA for York	
6		Daniel L. Hanington (1835–1909)	25 May 1882 – February; 1883	Appointment (24th Leg.) 1882 election (25th Leg.)	Conservative (Ldr. 1882)	MLA for Westmorland	
7		Andrew G. Blair (1844–1907)	3 March 1883 – 17 July 1896	Appointment (25th Leg.) 1886 election (26th Leg.) 1890 election (27th Leg.) 1892 election (28th Leg.) 1895 election (29th Leg.)	Liberal (Ldr. 1879)	MLA for York (1876-1892) MLA for Queens (1892-1896)	
8		James Mitchell (1843–1897)	17 July 1896 – 29 October 1897	Appointment (29th Leg.)	Liberal (Ldr. 1896)	MLA for Charlotte	
9		Henry Emmerson (1853–1914)	29 October 1897 – 31 August 1900	Appointment (29th Leg.) 1899 election (30th Leg.)	Liberal (Ldr. 1897)	MLA for Albert	
10		Lemuel J. Tweedie (1849–1917)	1 September 1900 – 2 March 1907	Appointment (30th Leg.) 1903 election (31st Leg.)	Liberal (Ldr. 1900)	MLA for Northumberland	
11		William Pugsley (1850–1925)	6 March 1907 – 31 May 1907	Appointment (31st Leg.)	Liberal (Ldr. 1907)	MLA for Kings	
12		Clifford W. Robinson (1866–1947)	31 May 1907 – 24 March 1908	Appointment (31st Leg.)	Liberal (Ldr. 1907)	MLA for Westmorland	
13		John Douglas Hazen (1860–1937)	24 March 1908 – 10 October 1911	1908 election (32nd Leg.)	Conservative (Ldr. 1899)	MLA for Sunbury	
14		James Kidd Flemming (1868–1927)	16 October 1911 – 6 December 1914	Appointment (32nd Leg.) 1912 election (33rd Leg.)	Conservative (Ldr. 1911)	MLA for Carleton	
15		George Clarke (1857–1917)	6 December 1914 – 1 February 1917	Appointment (33rd Leg.)	Conservative (Ldr. 1914)	MLA for Charlotte	
16		James A. Murray (1864–1960)	1 February 1917 – 4 April 1917	Appointment (33rd Leg.)	Conservative (Ldr. 1917)	MLA for Kings	
17		Walter E. Foster (1873–1947)	4 April 1917 – 1 February 1923	1917 election (34th Leg.) 1920 election (35th Leg.)	Liberal (Ldr. 1916)	MLA for Victoria (1917-1920) MLA for Saint John City (1920-1923)	
18		Peter J. Veniot (1863–1936)	28 February 1923 – 10 September 1925	Appointment (35th Leg.)	Liberal (Ldr. 1923)	MLA for Gloucester	
19		John B. M. Baxter (1868–1946)	14 September 1925 – 19 May 1931	1925 election (36th Leg.) 1930 election (37th Leg.)	Conservative (Ldr. 1925)	MLA for Saint John County	
20		Charles D. Richards (1879–1956)	18 May 1931 – 2 June 1933	Appointment (37th Leg.)	Conservative (Ldr. 1931)	MLA for York	
21		Leonard P. D. Tilley (1870–1947)	1 June 1933 – 12 July 1935	Appointment (37th Leg.)	Conservative (Ldr. 1933)	MLA for Saint John City	
22		Allison A. Dysart (1880–1962)	16 July 1935 – 13 March 1940	1935 election (38th Leg.) 1939 election (39th Leg.)	Liberal (Ldr. 1926)	MLA for Kent	
23		John B. McNair (1889–1968)	13 March 1940 – 7 October 1952	Appointment (39th Leg.) 1944 election (40th Leg.) 1948 election (41st Leg.)	Liberal (Ldr. 1940)	MLA for Victoria (1940-1944) MLA for York (1944-1952)	
24		Hugh John Flemming (1899–1982)	8 October 1952 – 11 July 1960	1952 election (42nd Leg.) 1956 election (43rd Leg.)	Progressive Conservative (Ldr. 1951)	MLA for Carleton	
25		Louis Joseph Robichaud (1925–2005)	12 July 1960 – 11 November 1970	1960 election (44th Leg.) 1963 election (45th Leg.) 1967 election (46th Leg.)	Liberal (Ldr. 1958)	MLA for Kent	
26		Richard Bennett Hatfield (1931–1991)	11 November 1970 – 27 October 1987	1970 election (47th Leg.) 1974 election (48th Leg.) 1978 election (49th Leg.) 1982 election (50th Leg.)	Progressive Conservative (Ldr. 1967)	MLA for Carleton (1961-1974) MLA for Carleton Centre (1974-1987)	
27		Frank McKenna (b. 1948)	27 October 1987 – 14 October 1997	1987 election (51st Leg.) 1991 election (52nd Leg.) 1995 election (53rd Leg.)	Liberal (Ldr. 1985)	MLA for Chatham (1982-1995) MLA for Miramichi-Bay du Vin (1995-1997)	
28		Ray Frenette (1935–2018)	14 October 1997 – 14 May 1998	Appointment (53rd Leg.)	Liberal (Ldr. 1997)	MLA for Moncton East	
29		Camille Thériault (b. 1955)	14 May 1998 – 21 June 1999	Appointment (53rd Leg.)	Liberal (Ldr. 1998)	MLA for Kent South	
30		Bernard Lord (b. 1965)	21 June 1999 – 3 October 2006	1999 election (54th Leg.) 2003 election (55th Leg.)	Progressive Conservative (Ldr. 1997)	MLA for Moncton East	
31		Shawn Graham (b. 1968)	3 October 2006 – 12 October 2010	2006 election (56th Leg.)	Liberal (Ldr. 2002)	MLA for Kent	
32		David Alward (b. 1959)	12 October 2010 – 7 October 2014	2010 election (57th Leg.)	Progressive Conservative (Ldr. 2008)	MLA for Woodstock	
33		Brian Gallant (b. 1982)	7 October 2014 – 9 November 2018	2014 election (58th Leg.) 2018 election (59th Leg.)	Liberal (Ldr. 2012)	MLA for Shediac Bay-Dieppe	
34		Blaine Higgs (b. 1954)	9 November 2018 – 2 November 2024	Appointment (59th Leg.) 2020 election (60th Leg.)	Progressive Conservative (Ldr. 2016)	MLA for Quispamsis	
35		Susan Holt (b. 1977)	2 November 2024 – incumbent	2024 election (61st Leg.)	Liberal (Ldr. 2022)	MLA for Fredericton South-Silverwood	
* The New Brunswick practice is to count George E. King as the 2nd and 4th premier.

== See also ==
- Leader of the Opposition (New Brunswick)
