= 35th New Brunswick Legislature =

The 35th New Brunswick Legislative Assembly represented New Brunswick between March 17, 1921, and July 17, 1925.

William Pugsley served as Lieutenant-Governor of New Brunswick in 1921. He was succeeded by William Frederick Todd in 1923.

Allison Dysart was chosen as speaker.

The Liberal Party led by Walter Edward Foster partnered with members of the United Farmers to form the first minority government in the province's history. Peter Veniot succeeded Foster in 1923.

== Members ==
Electoral District	Name	Party	First elected / previously elected
Albert	Lewis Smith	Conservative	1917
Albert	John L. Peck	Conservative	1917
Carleton	Fred Smith	United Farmers	1920
Carleton	Rennie K. Tracey	United Farmers	1920
Carleton	Samuel J. Burlock	United Farmers	1920
Charlotte	Henry I. Taylor	Conservative	1908
Charlotte	Scott D. Guptill	Conservative	1912
Charlotte	John M. Flewelling	Conservative	1920
Charlotte	John W. Scovil	Liberal	1920
Gloucester	Peter J. Veniot	Liberal	1894, 1917
Gloucester	James P. Byrne (Note: resigned to accept appointment as judge)	Liberal	1908, 1917
Gloucester	Seraphine R. Léger	Liberal	1908, 1917
Gloucester	Jean G. Robichaud (Note: elected to federal seat)	Liberal	1917
Gloucester	J. André Doucet (1923)	Liberal	1923
Gloucester	Ivan Rand (1925)	Liberal	1925
Kent	A. Allison Dysart	Liberal	1917
Kent	Philias J. Melanson	Liberal	1917
Kent	Auguste J. Bordage	Liberal	1917
Kings	Ormond W. Wetmore	Liberal	1920
Kings	George B. Jones	Conservative	1908
Kings	Hedley V. Dickson	Conservative	1912
Kings	James D. McKenna (1922)	Liberal	1922
Madawaska	Joseph E. Michaud	Liberal	1917
Madawaska	Donat L. Daigle	Liberal	1920
Madawaska	Lorne J. Violette (1922)	Liberal	1922
Moncton	C.W. Robinson (Note: named to Senate of Canada)	Liberal	1897, (Note: Westmorland) 1917
Moncton	E. Albert Reilly (1924)	Conservative	1924
Northumberland	John Vanderbeck (Note: died in 1921)	Conservative	1920
Northumberland	Fred A. Fowlie	Liberal	1920
Northumberland	John S. Martin	Liberal	1920
Northumberland	Charles J. Morrissy	Liberal	1920
Northumberland	Abram V. Vanderbeck (1921)	Conservative	1921
Queens	George Herbert King	Liberal	1917
Queens	Judson E. Hetherington	Liberal	1917
Restigouche	David A. Stewart	Conservative	1912, 1920
Restigouche	Henry Diotte	Conservative	1920
Saint John City	Walter E. Foster	Liberal	1917
Saint John City	William F. Roberts	Liberal	1917
Saint John City	Robert Thomas Hayes	Conservative	1920
Saint John City	William Edward Scully	Liberal	1920
Saint John County	John M. Baxter	Conservative	1911
Saint John County	L. Murray Curren	Liberal	1920
Saint John County	Allister Bentley (1922)	Liberal	1922
Sunbury	Robert B. Smith	Liberal	1917
Sunbury	David W. Mersereau	Liberal	1917
Victoria	D. Wetmore Pickett	United Farmers	1920
Victoria	George W. Warnock	United Farmers	1920
Westmorland	Fred Magee	Liberal	1917
Westmorland	Frederick L. Estabrooks	Liberal	1920
Westmorland	A. Chase Fawcett	United Farmers	1920
Westmorland	Reid McManus	Liberal	1920
York	James K. Pinder	Conservative	1892, 1908
York	Charles D. Richards	Conservative	1920
York	John A. Young	Conservative	1908
York	Samuel B. Hunter	Liberal	1917

== Notes ==
Preceded by 34th New Brunswick Legislature	Legislative Assemblies of New Brunswick; 1921–1925	Succeeded by 36th New Brunswick Legislature
