= 34th New Brunswick Legislature =

The 34th New Brunswick Legislative Assembly represented New Brunswick between May 10, 1917, and September 16, 1920.

Gilbert Ganong served as Lieutenant-Governor of New Brunswick in 1917. He was succeeded by William Pugsley in November of that year.

William Currie was chosen as speaker in 1917. J.E. Hetherington became speaker after Currie resigned in 1919.

The Liberal Party led by Walter Edward Foster defeated the ruling Conservative party to form the government.

== Members ==
Electoral District	Name	Party	First elected / previously elected
Albert	Lewis Smith	Conservative	1917
Albert	John L. Peck	Conservative	1917
Carleton	Benjamin F. Smith	Conservative	1903
Carleton	William S. Sutton	Conservative	1916
Carleton	George L. White (Note: died)	Conservative	1912
Charlotte	Henry I. Taylor	Conservative	1908
Charlotte	R. Watson Grimmer	Conservative	1917
Charlotte	Scott D. Guptill	Conservative	1912
Charlotte	Harry D. Smith	Conservative	1917
Gloucester	Peter J. Veniot	Liberal	1894, 1917
Gloucester	James P. Byrne	Liberal	1908, 1917
Gloucester	Seraphine R. Léger	Liberal	1908, 1917
Gloucester	Jean G. Robichaud	Liberal	1917
Kent	Philias J. Melanson	Liberal	1917
Kent	Auguste J. Bordage	Liberal	1917
Kent	A. Allison Dysart	Liberal	1917
Kings	James A. Murray	Conservative	1908
Kings	George B. Jones	Conservative	1908
Kings	Hedley V. Dickson	Conservative	1912
Madawaska	Louis-Auguste Dugal	Liberal	1912
Madawaska	Joseph E. Michaud	Liberal	1917
Moncton	C.W. Robinson	Liberal	1897, (Note: Westmorland) 1917
Northumberland	John P. Burchill	Liberal	1882, 1887, 1908, 1917
Northumberland	Robert Murray	Liberal	1905, 1917
Northumberland	David V. Allain	Liberal	1917
Northumberland	Francis C. McGrath	Liberal	1917
Queens	George Herbert King	Liberal	1917
Queens	Judson E. Hetherington	Liberal	1917
Restigouche	Arthur T. Leblanc	Liberal	1917
Restigouche	William Currie	Liberal	1907, 1917
Saint John City	John R. Campbell	Conservative	1917
Saint John City	Leonard P. Tilley	Conservative	1912
Saint John City	Frank L. Potts	Conservative	1917
Saint John City	William F. Roberts	Liberal	1917
Saint John County	John M. Baxter	Conservative	1911
Saint John County	Thomas R. Carson	Conservative	1912
Sunbury	David W. Mersereau	Liberal	1917
Sunbury	Robert B. Smith	Liberal	1917
Victoria	John F. Tweeddale	Liberal	1903, 1917
Victoria	James Burgess (Note: resigned)	Liberal (Note: First elected as an Independent)	1903, 1917
Victoria	Walter Edward Foster (1917)	Liberal	1917
Westmorland	Ernest A. Smith	Liberal	1916
Westmorland	Francis J. Sweeney	Liberal	1903, 1917
Westmorland	Clement M. Leger	Liberal	1903, 1917
Westmorland	Fred Magee	Liberal	1917
York	James K. Pinder	Conservative	1892, 1908
York	John A. Young	Conservative	1908
York	William C. Crocket	Conservative	1917
York	Samuel B. Hunter	Liberal	1917

== Notes ==
Preceded by 33rd New Brunswick Legislature	Legislative Assemblies of New Brunswick; 1917–1920	Succeeded by 35th New Brunswick Legislature
