= Daniel Lionel Hanington =

Canadian politician and jurist

6th Premier of New Brunswick
- In office May 25, 1882 – March 3, 1883
- Monarch: Victoria
- Lieutenant Governor: Robert Duncan Wilmot
- Preceded by: John J. Fraser
- Succeeded by: Andrew G. Blair

MLA for Westmorland
- In office December 26, 1870 – June 18, 1874 Serving with Joseph Lytle Moore, John A. Humphrey, Pierre-Amand Landry, Thomas Pickard, Angus McQueen
- Preceded by: Bliss Botsford
- Succeeded by: Edward J. Smith
- In office June 25, 1878 – April 1, 1892 Serving with Amasa E. Killam, Charles A. Black, Joseph Laurence Black, Olivier-Maximin Melanson, Pierre-Amand Landry, Henry Absalom Powell, Joseph A. McQueen, Joseph Laurence Black, John A. Humphrey, H.T. Stevens, Henry Absalom Powell
- Preceded by: Thomas Pickard
- Succeeded by: Amasa E. Killam

Personal details
- Born: June 27, 1835 Shediac, New Brunswick, British North America
- Died: May 5, 1909 (aged 73) Dorchester, New Brunswick, Canada
- Party: Conservative
- Spouse: Emily Myers Wetmore (m. 1861)
- Relations: Daniel Hanington (father)
- Education: Mount Allison Academy
- Occupation: lawyer and jurist
- Profession: politician

Daniel Lionel Hanington (June 27, 1835 – May 5, 1909) was a New Brunswick, Canada politician and jurist.

He was born at Shediac, New Brunswick, the son of Daniel Hanington, and was educated there and at Mount Allison Academy in Sackville. He went on to study law and was called to the New Brunswick bar in 1861. In that same year, he married Emily Myers Wetmore. He served as a school trustee for several years and was clerk for the Westmorland County court from 1867 to 1870.

Hanington ran unsuccessfully for a seat in the provincial legislature for Westmorland in 1870 but was elected in an 1870 by-election as a Liberal-Conservative. He was defeated in 1874 then regained his seat in 1878 and entered the cabinet of Premier John James Fraser as minister without portfolio and succeeded Fraser as premier in 1882. Hanington was sympathetic to Acadian rights and appointed a member of that community, Pierre-Amand Landry, to the senior cabinet position of provincial secretary. However, Hanington faced a leader of the opposition, Andrew G. Blair who had organised the Liberal Party into a powerful force. In 1883, Blair defeated Hanington's Conservative government in a Motion of No Confidence and won the subsequent election. Hanington continued as leader of the opposition but was unable to defeat Blair's Liberals in the 1886 election. He remained in the legislature until 1892 and, in 1896, he accepted an appointment to the bench as a member of the province's Supreme Court.

He was the presiding judge at the last trial of Tom Collins.
