= 33rd New Brunswick Legislature =

The 33rd New Brunswick Legislative Assembly represented New Brunswick between February 13, 1913, and January 20, 1917.

Josiah Wood served as Lieutenant-Governor of New Brunswick.

G.J. Clarke was chosen as speaker in 1913. W.B. Dickson became speaker in 1914 after Clarke became party leader in 1914. O.M. Melanson became speaker in 1916 after Dickson died.

The Conservative Party led by James Kidd Flemming formed the government. George Johnson Clarke became party leader in 1914 when Flemming was forced to resign. When Clarke resigned due to poor health in 1917, James Alexander Murray served as leader until the general election held later that year.

== Members ==
Electoral District	Name	Party	First elected / previously elected
Albert	Walter B. Dickson	Independent	1908
Albert	George D. Prescott	Independent	1908
Carleton	James K. Fleming (Note: resigned)	Conservative	1900
Carleton	Donald Munro	Independent	1908
Carleton	George L. White	Conservative	1912
Carleton	Benjamin F. Smith (1915)	Conservative	1903, 1915
Carleton	William S. Sutton (1916)	Conservative	1916
Charlotte	Ward C.H. Grimmer	Conservative	1903
Charlotte	George J. Clarke	Conservative	1903
Charlotte	Henry I. Taylor	Conservative	1908
Charlotte	Scott D. Guptill	Conservative	1912
Gloucester	Joseph B. Hachey	Conservative	1912
Gloucester	Alfred J. Witzell	Conservative	1912
Gloucester	A.J.H. Stewart	Independent	1912
Gloucester	Martin J. Robichaud	Conservative	1912
Kent	Thomas J. Bourque	Conservative	1908
Kent	D.V. Landry	Conservative	1908
Kent	John Sheridan	Independent	1908
Kings	George B. Jones	Conservative	1908
Kings	James A. Murray	Conservative	1908
Kings	Hedley V. Dickson	Conservative	1912
Madawaska	Louis-Auguste Dugal	Liberal	1912
Madawaska	Joseph H. Pelletier	Independent	1912
Moncton	Otto B. Price	Conservative	1912
Northumberland	William L. Allain	Conservative	1908
Northumberland	John Morrissy	Liberal	1887, 1903
Northumberland	Francis D. Swim	Independent	1912
Northumberland	James L. Stewart	Independent Conservative	1912
Queens	Arthur R. Slipp	Independent	1908
Queens	Harry W. Woods	Independent	1908
Restigouche	David A. Stewart	Conservative	1912
Restigouche	Arthur Culligan	Conservative	1912
Saint John City	John E. Wilson	Independent	1908
Saint John City	Leonard P. Tilley	Conservative	1912
Saint John City	Charles B. Lockhart	Conservative	1895, 1912
Saint John City	Phillip Grannan	Independent	1912
Saint John County	John M. Baxter	Conservative	1911
Saint John County	Thomas B. Carson	Conservative	1912
Sunbury	Parker Glasier	Conservative	1899
Sunbury	George A. Perley	Independent	1899
Victoria	J. Leigh White	Independent	1912
Victoria	Titus J. Carter	Independent	1912
Westmorland	Frank B. Black	Conservative	1912
Westmorland	Patrick G. Mahoney (Note: named to cabinet; lost subsequent by-election)	Conservative	1912
Westmorland	William F. Humphrey	Independent	1899, 1912
Westmorland	Olivier-Maximin Melanson	Conservative	1890, 1899, 1912
Westmorland	Ernest A. Smith (1916)	Liberal	1916
York	Harry F. McLeod (Note: elected to federal seat)	Conservative	1908
York	James K. Pinder	Conservative	1892, 1908
York	Oscar E. Morehouse	Conservative	1911
York	John A. Young	Conservative	1908
York	Percy A. Guthrie (1914)	Conservative	1914

== Notes ==
Preceded by 32nd New Brunswick Legislature	Legislative Assemblies of New Brunswick; 1912–1917	Succeeded by 34th New Brunswick Legislature
