= 45th New Brunswick Legislature =

The 45th New Brunswick Legislative Assembly represented New Brunswick between May 28, 1963, and September 8, 1967.

Joseph Leonard O'Brien was Lieutenant-Governor of New Brunswick in 1963. He was succeeded by John Babbitt McNair in 1965.

Bernard A. Jean was chosen as speaker. H.H. Williamson became speaker in 1966 after Jean was named to the Executive Council.

The Liberal Party led by Louis Robichaud formed the government.

== Members ==
Electoral District	Name	Party	First elected / previously elected
Albert	Claude D. Taylor	Progressive Conservative	1952
Albert	Everett Newcombe	Progressive Conservative	1952
Carleton	Fred A. McCain	Progressive Conservative	1952
Carleton	Edison Stairs	Progressive Conservative	1960
Carleton	Richard B. Hatfield	Progressive Conservative	1961
Charlotte	Kenneth J. Webber	Liberal	1960
Charlotte	Henry G. Irwin	Liberal	1960
Charlotte	Leon G. Small	Liberal	1960
Charlotte	Alfred Hawkins	Liberal	1960
Gloucester	J. Omer Boudreau	Liberal	1963
Gloucester	Ernest Richard	Liberal	1948
Gloucester	Claude Savoie	Liberal	1956
Gloucester	H. H. Williamson	Liberal	1960
Gloucester	Bernard A. Jean	Liberal	1960
Kent	Louis J. Robichaud	Liberal	1952
Kent	André F. Richard	Liberal	1956
Kent	Hugh A. Dysart (Note: died in 1964)	Liberal	1952
Kent	Camille Bordage (1964)	Liberal	1964
Kings	John B.M. Baxter	Progressive Conservative	1962
Kings	Cyril B. Sherwood	Progressive Conservative	1952
Kings	George E. Horton	Progressive Conservative	1962
Madawaska	Laurier Lévesque	Liberal	1960
Madawaska	J. Adrien Lévesque	Liberal	1960
Madawaska	Fred E. Soucy	Liberal	1963
Moncton	L.G. DesBrisay	Liberal	1960
Moncton	Gilbert Robichaud	Liberal	1960
Northumberland	Clarence S. Menzies	Liberal	1960
Northumberland	Graham Crocker	Liberal	1960
Northumberland	Norbert Thériault	Liberal	1960
Northumberland	J. Fraser Kerr	Liberal	1961
Queens	Wilfred Bishop	Progressive Conservative	1952
Queens	J. Arthur Moore	Progressive Conservative	1925, 1939, 1952
Restigouche	Raymond Doucett	Liberal	1963
Restigouche	Patrick Guérette	Liberal	1960
Restigouche	Georges L. Dumont (Note: died in 1966)	Liberal	1960
Restigouche	J.C. Van Horne (1967)	Progressive Conservative	1967
Saint John City	D. A. Riley (Note: elected to federal seat)	Liberal	1963
Saint John City	John D. MacCallum	Liberal	1963
Saint John City	Donald D. Patterson	Progressive Conservative	1952
Saint John City	George E. McInerney	Progressive Conservative	1952
Saint John City	Stephen Weyman (1966)	Liberal	1966
Saint John County	C. A. McIlveen	Progressive Conservative	1960
Saint John County	Rodman Logan	Progressive Conservative	1963
Sunbury	R. Lee MacFarlane	Liberal	1960
Sunbury	William R. Duffie	Liberal	1961
Victoria	Leon B. Rideout	Progressive Conservative	1956, 1963
Victoria	J. Stewart Brooks	Progressive Conservative	1952
Westmorland	Joseph E. Leblanc	Liberal	1952
Westmorland	Donald C. Harper (Note: died in 1965)	Liberal	1952
Westmorland	Cléophas Léger	Liberal	1952
Westmorland	Percy Mitton	Liberal	1960
Westmorland	W. Wynn Meldrum (1965)	Liberal	1965
York	Harry Ames	Progressive Conservative	1952
York	George Everett Chalmers	Progressive Conservative	1960
York	C. Weldon Lawrence	Progressive Conservative	1952
York	J. F. McInerney	Progressive Conservative	1952

== Notes ==
Preceded by 44th New Brunswick Legislature	Legislative Assemblies of New Brunswick; 1963–1967	Succeeded by 46th New Brunswick Legislature
