= 46th New Brunswick Legislature =

The 46th New Brunswick Legislative Assembly represented New Brunswick between February 27, 1968, and September 3, 1970.

Wallace Samuel Bird was Lieutenant-Governor of New Brunswick.

Robert B. McCready was chosen as speaker.

The Liberal Party led by Louis Robichaud formed the government.

== Members ==
| Electoral District | Name | Party | First elected / previously elected |
|---|---|---|---|
| Albert | Claude D. Taylor | Progressive Conservative | 1952 |
| Albert | Brenda Robertson | Progressive Conservative | 1967 |
| Bathurst | H. H. Williamson | Liberal | 1960 |
| Campbellton | Lewis C. Ayles | Progressive Conservative | 1967 |
| Carleton | Richard B. Hatfield | Progressive Conservative | 1961 |
| Carleton | Fred A. McCain | Progressive Conservative | 1952 |
| Carleton | Edison Stairs | Progressive Conservative | 1960 |
| Charlotte | John E. Rigby | Progressive Conservative | 1967 |
| Charlotte | G. W. N. Cockburn | Progressive Conservative | 1967 |
| Charlotte | Leland McGaw | Progressive Conservative | 1967 |
| Charlotte | DeCosta Young | Progressive Conservative | 1967 |
| Edmundston | B. Fernand Nadeau | Liberal | 1967 |
| Fredericton | George Everett Chalmers | Progressive Conservative | 1960 |
| Fredericton | J. F. McInerney (Note: died in 1967) | Progressive Conservative | 1952 |
| Fredericton | Lawrence Garvie (1968) | Progressive Conservative | 1968 |
| Gloucester | Gérard Haché | Liberal | 1967 |
| Gloucester | Ernest Richard | Liberal | 1948 |
| Gloucester | J. Omer Boudreau | Liberal | 1963 |
| Gloucester | Bernard A. Jean | Liberal | 1960 |
| Gloucester | A. A. Ferguson | Liberal | 1967 |
| Kent | Louis J. Robichaud | Liberal | 1952 |
| Kent | André F. Richard | Liberal | 1956 |
| Kent | Alan R. Graham | Liberal | 1967 |
| Kings | John B.M. Baxter | Progressive Conservative | 1962 |
| Kings | George E. Horton | Progressive Conservative | 1962 |
| Kings | Cyril B. Sherwood | Progressive Conservative | 1952 |
| Madawaska | Laurier Lévesque | Liberal | 1960 |
| Madawaska | J. Adrien Lévesque | Liberal | 1960 |
| Madawaska | Gérald Clavette | Liberal | 1967 |
| Moncton | L.G. DesBrisay | Liberal | 1960 |
| Moncton | R. V. Lenihan | Liberal | 1967 |
| Moncton | Léonide H. Cyr | Liberal | 1967 |
| Northumberland | Graham Crocker | Liberal | 1960 |
| Northumberland | J. Fraser Kerr | Liberal | 1961 |
| Northumberland | Clarence S. Menzies | Liberal | 1960 |
| Northumberland | J. L. A. Savoie (Note: died in 1969) | Liberal | 1967 |
| Northumberland | Norbert Thériault | Liberal | 1960 |
| Northumberland | Frank E. Kane (1969) | Liberal | 1969 |
| Queens | Robert B. McCready | Liberal | 1967 |
| Queens | Wilfred Bishop | Progressive Conservative | 1952 |
| Restigouche | Wilfred Sénéchal | Liberal | 1967 |
| Restigouche | Raymond Doucett | Liberal | 1963 |
| Restigouche | J. M. Joffre Daigle (Note: died in 1968) | Liberal | 1967 |
| Restigouche | J.C. Van Horne (1968) | Progressive Conservative | 1967, 1968 |
| Saint John Centre | J. Lorne McGuigan | Progressive Conservative | 1967 |
| Saint John Centre | George E. McInerney | Progressive Conservative | 1952 |
| Saint John Centre | Donald D. Patterson | Progressive Conservative | 1952 |
| Saint John Centre | Robert J. Higgins | Liberal | 1967 |
| Saint John East | C. A. McIlveen | Progressive Conservative | 1960 |
| Saint John East | William J. Woodroffe | Progressive Conservative | 1967 |
| Saint John West | Rodman Logan | Progressive Conservative | 1963 |
| Sunbury | William R. Duffie | Liberal | 1961 |
| Sunbury | Douglas A. Flower | Liberal | 1967 |
| Victoria | Leon B. Rideout | Progressive Conservative | 1956, 1963 |
| Victoria | J. Stewart Brooks | Progressive Conservative | 1952 |
| Westmorland | Percy Mitton | Liberal | 1960 |
| Westmorland | Joseph E. Leblanc | Liberal | 1952 |
| Westmorland | W. Wynn Meldrum | Liberal | 1965 |
| Westmorland | Cléophas Léger | Liberal | 1952 |
| York | Harry Ames | Progressive Conservative | 1952 |
| York | Carl Mooers | Progressive Conservative | 1967 |

== Notes ==
| Preceded by 45th New Brunswick Legislature | Legislative Assemblies of New Brunswick; 1967–1970 | Succeeded by 47th New Brunswick Legislature |
