= John W. Y. Smith =

Member of the Legislative Assembly of New Brunswick
- In office 1892–1895 Serving with W. Woodbury Wells, Amasa E. Killam, Henry Absalom Powell
- Constituency: Westmorland

Personal details
- Born: March 18, 1869 Halifax, Nova Scotia
- Died: November 3, 1936 (aged 67) Shediac, New Brunswick
- Party: Independent
- Spouse: C. de Lancey Robinson (m. 1902)
- Relations: Albert James Smith (father)
- Children: 1
- Occupation: merchant

John Wilson Young Smith (March 18, 1869 – November 3, 1936) was a Canadian politician. He served in the Legislative Assembly of New Brunswick from 1892 to 1895 as an independent member. He died in 1936.
