= New Brunswick Legislature =

Legislative Assembly and Lieutenant Governor of New Brunswick

New Brunswick Legislature Législature du Nouveau-Brunswick
- 61st New Brunswick Legislature

Type
- Type: Bicameral (1786–1892); Unicameral (1892–present)
- Houses: Legislative Council (until 1892); Legislative Assembly
- Sovereign: The lieutenant governor (representing the King of Canada)

History
- Founded: 1786

Meeting place
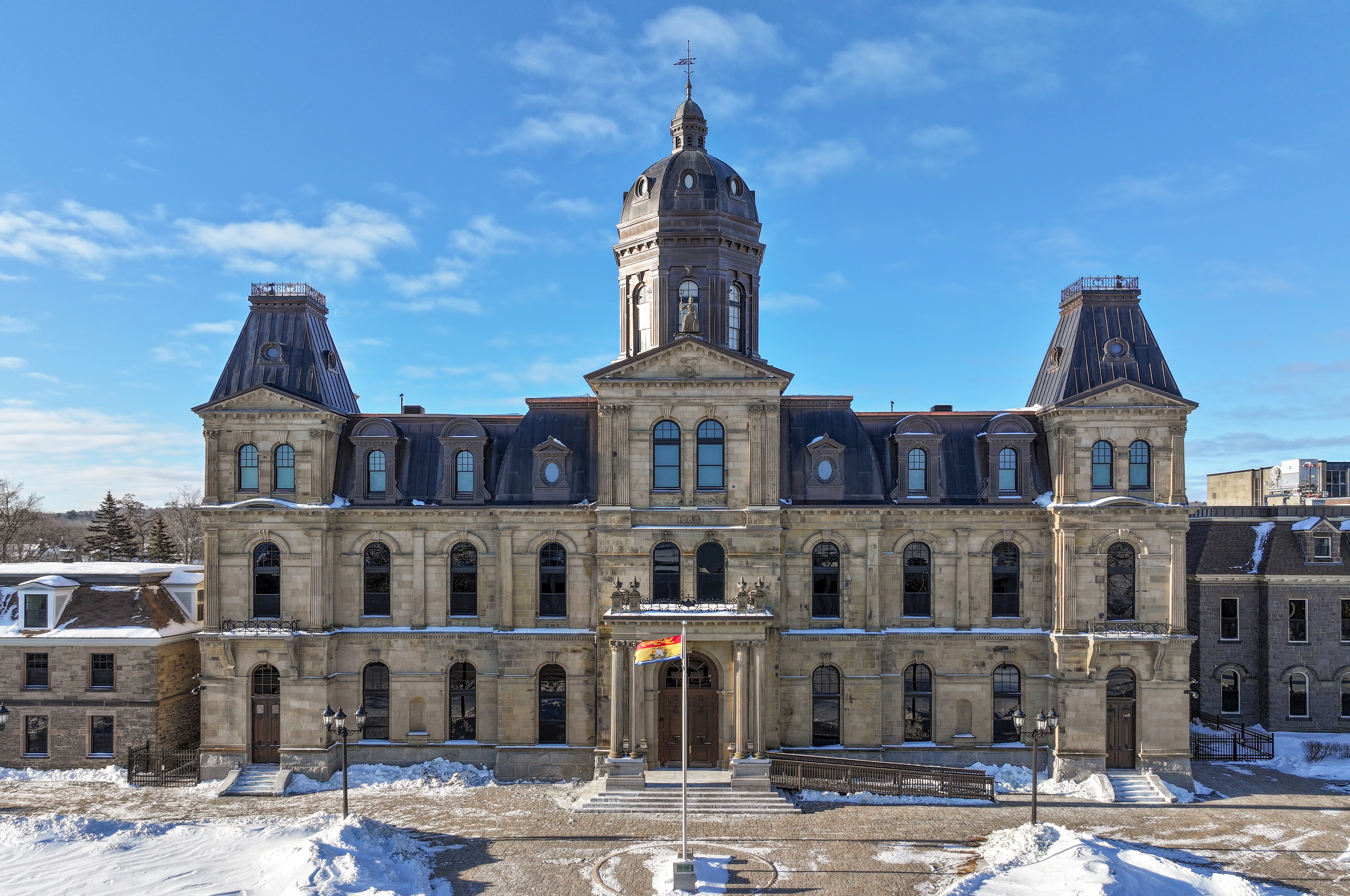
- Legislative Building, Fredericton, New Brunswick, Canada

The New Brunswick Legislature is the legislature of the province of New Brunswick, Canada. Today, the legislature is made of two elements: the lieutenant governor (representing the King of Canada) and the unicameral assembly called the Legislative Assembly of New Brunswick. The legislature has existed de jure since New Brunswick separated from Nova Scotia in 1784, but was not first convened until 1786.

Like the Canadian federal government, New Brunswick uses a Westminster-style system, in which members are sent to the Legislative Assembly after general elections. Usually the leader of the party with the most seats is asked by the lieutenant governor to form a government who then becomes Premier of New Brunswick and appoints an Executive Council of New Brunswick. The premier is New Brunswick's head of government, while the lieutenant governor represents Canada's head of state Charles III, King of Canada.

The legislature was originally bicameral, with an upper house called the Legislative Council of New Brunswick. The upper house was abolished in 1892.

== List of legislatures ==
Following is a list of the 61 times the legislature has been convened since 1786.

Assembly	Period	Election	Dissolution
61st New Brunswick Legislature	2024–present	October 21, 2024	
60th New Brunswick Legislature	2020–2024	September 14, 2020	June 7, 2024
59th New Brunswick Legislature	2018–2020	September 24, 2018	August 17, 2020
58th New Brunswick Legislature	2014–2018	September 22, 2014	August 23, 2018
57th New Brunswick Legislature	2010–2014	September 27, 2010	August 21, 2014
56th New Brunswick Legislature	2006–2010	September 18, 2006	August 2010
55th New Brunswick Legislature	2003–2006	June 9, 2003	August 18, 2006
54th New Brunswick Legislature	1999–2003	June 7, 1999	May 10, 2003
53rd New Brunswick Legislature	1995–1999	September 11, 1995	May 8, 1999
52nd New Brunswick Legislature	1991–1995	September 23, 1991	August 12, 1995
51st New Brunswick Legislature	1987–1991	October 13, 1987	August 22, 1991
50th New Brunswick Legislature	1982–1987	October 12, 1982	August 29, 1987
49th New Brunswick Legislature	1978–1982	October 23, 1978	September 1, 1982
48th New Brunswick Legislature	1974–1978	November 18, 1974	September 15, 1978
47th New Brunswick Legislature	1970–1974	October 26, 1970	October 11, 1974
46th New Brunswick Legislature	1967–1970	October 23, 1967	September 3, 1970
45th New Brunswick Legislature	1963–1967	April 22, 1963	September 8, 1967
44th New Brunswick Legislature	1960–1963	June 27, 1960	March 12, 1963
43rd New Brunswick Legislature	1956–1960	June 18, 1956	May 13, 1960
42nd New Brunswick Legislature	1952–1956	September 22, 1952	April 17, 1956
41st New Brunswick Legislature	1948–1952	June 28, 1948	July 16, 1952
40th New Brunswick Legislature	1944–1948	August 28, 1944	May 8, 1948
39th New Brunswick Legislature	1939–1944	November 20, 1939	July 10, 1944
38th New Brunswick Legislature	1935–1939	June 27, 1935	October 24, 1939
37th New Brunswick Legislature	1930–1935	June 18, 1930	May 22, 1935
36th New Brunswick Legislature	1925–1930	August 10, 1925	May 26, 1930
35th New Brunswick Legislature	1920–1925	October 9, 1920	July 17, 1925
34th New Brunswick Legislature	1917–1920	February 24, 1917	September 16, 1920
33rd New Brunswick Legislature	1912–1917	June 20, 1912	January 20, 1917
32nd New Brunswick Legislature	1908–1912	March 3, 1908	May 25, 1912
31st New Brunswick Legislature	1903–1908	March 3, 1903	January 23, 1908
30th New Brunswick Legislature	1899–1903	February 18, 1899	February 5, 1903
29th New Brunswick Legislature	1895–1899	October, 1895	January 26, 1899
28th New Brunswick Legislature	1892–1895	October, 1892	September 28, 1895
27th New Brunswick Legislature	1890–1892	January 20, 1890	September 28, 1892
26th New Brunswick Legislature	1886–1890	April 26, 1886	December 30, 1889
25th New Brunswick Legislature	1882–1886	June, 1882	April 2, 1886
24th New Brunswick Legislature	1878–1882	June, 1878	May 25, 1882
23rd New Brunswick Legislature	1874–1878	May–June, 1874	May 14, 1878
22nd New Brunswick Legislature	1870–1874	June–July, 1870	May 15, 1874
21st New Brunswick Legislature	1866–1870	May–June, 1866	June 3, 1870
20th New Brunswick Legislature	1865–1866	February–March, 1865	May 9, 1866
19th New Brunswick Legislature	1861–1865	June, 1861	February 8, 1865
18th New Brunswick Legislature	1857–1861	April–May, 1857	May 14, 1861
17th New Brunswick Legislature	1856–1857	June–July, 1856	April 1, 1857
16th New Brunswick Legislature	1854–1856	June, 1854	May 30, 1856
15th New Brunswick Legislature	1850–1854	June–July, 1850	May 19, 1854
14th New Brunswick Legislature	1846–1850	October, 1846	May 31, 1850
13th New Brunswick Legislature	1843–1846	December, 1842– January, 1843	September 16, 1846
12th New Brunswick Legislature	1837–1842	September–October, 1837	December 1, 1842
11th New Brunswick Legislature	1835–1837	December, 1834– January, 1835	August 18, 1837
10th New Brunswick Legislature	1830–1834	October, 1830	
9th New Brunswick Legislature	1827–1830	June, 1827	
8th New Brunswick Legislature	1820–1827	June, 1820	
7th New Brunswick Legislature	1819–1820	October, 1819	
6th New Brunswick Legislature	1816–1819	August–September, 1816	
5th New Brunswick Legislature	1809–1816	September–October, 1809	July, 1816
4th New Brunswick Legislature	1802–1809	October–November 1802	
3rd New Brunswick Legislature	1795–1802	August–September, 1795	May, 1802
2nd New Brunswick Legislature	1793–1795	December, 1792- January, 1793	1795
1st New Brunswick Legislature	1786–1792	November, 1785	December, 1792
