= Clifford William Robinson =

Canadian politician (1866–1944)

The Honourable Clifford William Robinson
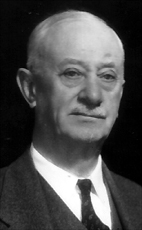
- The Hon. Clifford W. Robinson

12th Premier of New Brunswick
- In office May 31, 1907 – March 24, 1908
- Monarch: Edward VII
- Lieutenant Governor: Lemuel John Tweedie
- Preceded by: William Pugsley
- Succeeded by: John Douglas Hazen

MLA for Westmorland
- In office May 29, 1897 – June 20, 1912 Serving with Ambrose D. Richard, William F. Humphrey, Francis J. Sweeney, W. Woodbury Wells, Arthur Bliss Copp, Olivier-Maximin Melanson, Clement M. Leger
- Preceded by: Amasa E. Killam
- Succeeded by: William T. Humphrey

MLA for Moncton
- In office February 24, 1917 – May 5, 1924
- Preceded by: Otto Baird Price
- Succeeded by: E. Albert Reilly

Senator for Moncton, New Brunswick
- In office May 5, 1924 – July 27, 1944
- Appointed by: William Lyon Mackenzie King

Personal details
- Born: September 1, 1866 Moncton, New Brunswick
- Died: July 27, 1944 (aged 77) Montreal, Quebec, Canada
- Party: Liberal
- Spouses: Annie M. Hinson (m. 1890) Jane A. Harris Peters (m. 1933)
- Education: Mount Allison University
- Occupation: lawyer, businessman
- Profession: politician

Clifford William Robinson (September 1, 1866 – July 27, 1944) was a New Brunswick lawyer, businessman and politician, the 12th premier of New Brunswick.

He was born in Moncton, New Brunswick and was educated in Point de Bute, Saint John and Moncton before attending Mount Allison University. Robinson worked as a bookkeeper from 1886 to 1889 before studying law. He was called to the bar in 1892 and set up practice in Moncton. In 1897 he became both mayor of Moncton and a member of the provincial House of Assembly as a Liberal. He served as Speaker and Provincial Secretary before becoming Premier in 1907. The Liberals had been in power since 1883, however, and voters opted for a change in the 1908 election which brought the Conservatives to power. Robinson continued in the legislature as an opposition MLA.

When the Liberals returned to power in 1917, Robinson became minister without portfolio and then Minister of Lands and Mines in the governments of Walter E. Foster and Peter J. Veniot until 1924 when he was appointed to the Senate of Canada by Prime Minister William Lyon Mackenzie King.

Robinson was the main shareholder and, for a time, president for the Moncton Transcript. He also helped establish a French language newspaper l'Acadien. He was president or director for a number of businesses in the Moncton area, helped found the Central Trust Company Limited and the Petitcodiac Hydro Development Company and also helped establish Moncton radio station CKCW.

He died in office in Montreal at the age of 77.

Political offices
| Preceded by John Percival Burchill | Speaker of the Legislative Assembly of New Brunswick; 1901-1907 | Succeeded by Charles J. Osman |
New Brunswick provincial government of Walter E. Foster
Cabinet post (1)
| Predecessor | Office | Successor |
| 'Ernest A. Smith' | 'Minister of Lands and Mines'; 1920-1924 | 'Judson E. Hetherington' |
New Brunswick provincial government of Clifford W. Robinson
Cabinet posts (2)
| Predecessor | Office | Successor |
| 'William Pugsley' | 'Minister of Finance'; 1907-1908 | 'James K. Flemming' |
| 'William Pugsley' | 'Attorney General of New Brunswick'; 1907-1907 | 'Harrison A. McKeown' |
