= Amasa E. Killam =

Canadian politician and railroader (1834–1922)

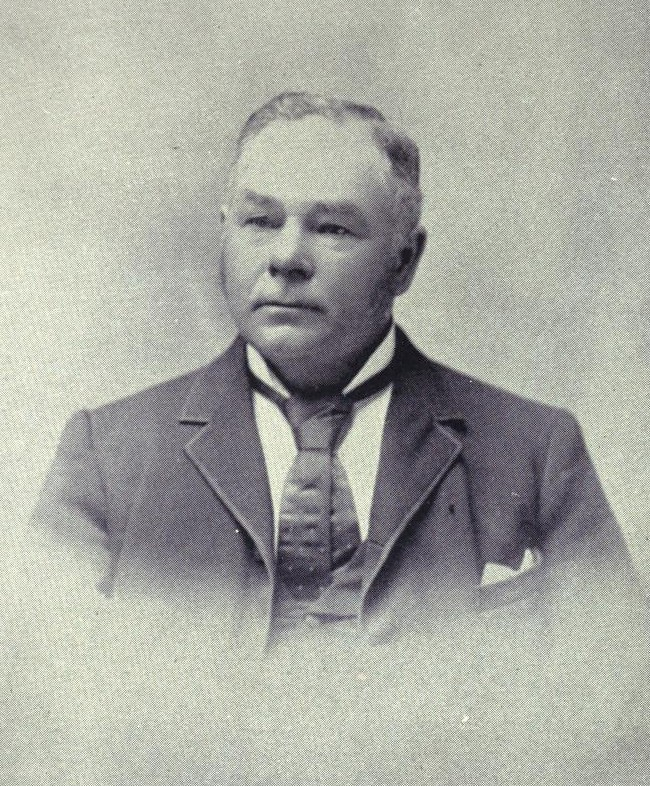
- Killam in 1895

Member of the Legislative Assembly of New Brunswick for Westmorland
- In office 1892–1897
- Preceded by: Olivier-Maximin Melanson
- Succeeded by: Clifford William Robinson
- In office 1883–1890
- Preceded by: Pierre-Amand Landry
- Succeeded by: Olivier-Maximin Melanson
- In office 1879–1882
- Preceded by: John A. Humphrey
- Succeeded by: John A. Humphrey

Personal details
- Born: 25 August 1834 Dorchester, New Brunswick, Canada
- Died: 20 August 1922 (aged 87) Moncton, New Brunswick, Canada
- Party: Liberal Conservative

Amasa Emerson Killam (25 August 1834 – 20 August 1922) was a Canadian politician, railroad official and postmaster general. He represented Westmorland County in the Legislative Assembly of New Brunswick from 1879 to 1882 and from 1883 to 1899 as a Liberal Conservative member. In his later years, he worked as a bridge inspector in Canada and then as president of the American Railway Bridge and Building Association (now part of the American Railway Engineering and Maintenance-of-Way Association). In the late 1800s, he was one of Moncton's wealthiest residents.

== Early life and family ==
Killam was born in 1834 in Dorchester, New Brunswick. Little is known about his ancestry. Some sources say that his paternal grandfather, Cyprian Killam, was an officer of the British Army who served in the American War of Independence, afterwards settling in Sackville after the war. However, others state that his paternal great-grandfather—also named Amasa Killam—was the one who served at the war and either the one who settled in Sackville or had died while doing garrison duties in Halifax, and that his son Cyprian moved from Connecticut to Dorchester to settle there. Killam's maternal grandparents were both United Empire Loyalists.

His parents moved to Wheaton Settlement in Salisbury when he was two years old. He was educated in common schools in Salisbury. At the age of 14, he took charge of a farm and cleared out 100 acres of land and built a house and barn there before he became 22. In 1875, he went to Moncton, where he established a permanent residence. Killam married three times, and had eight children among all of his marriages.

== Career ==
He held the title of postmaster general of Wheaton Settlement from 1863 until 1874. During that time, he worked as a subcontractor for public road bridges and was contracted by the New Brunswick government to rebuild the Apohaqui bridge in 1867. After that, he continued to work with bridges, like the Nerepis bridge near Saint John and the Roach bridge in Sussex and many more.

In 1876, he was persuaded to work as a railroad contractor and was contracted to help complete the Salisbury and Albert Railway, of which he was manager for several years. In 1881, he helped complete the construction of the St. Martins and Upham Railroad and became manager there for five years. In 1884, he bought the Elgin Petitcodiac and Havelock Railroad and built an extension in Havelock in 1885, and became the managing director there. In 1886, he took an interest in building the Central Railway and became the managing director of the Railway alongside the Buctouche and Moncton Railway.

In 1889, the chief contractor of the Albert Southern Railway Company, Warren Oliver, sold his interest of the Elgin Peticodiac and Havelock Railway to him because of Oliver's financial state of near bankruptcy. In the same year, Killam retired from active work in railways, and was elected to be one of the managing directors and the next chief contractor of the Albert Southern Railway Company. In 1890, lawyer Henry Absalom Powell sued Killam alongside Gaius S. Turner and H.R. Emmerson for the non-payment of a one thousand dollar bill dated in 1889, but was settled out of court.

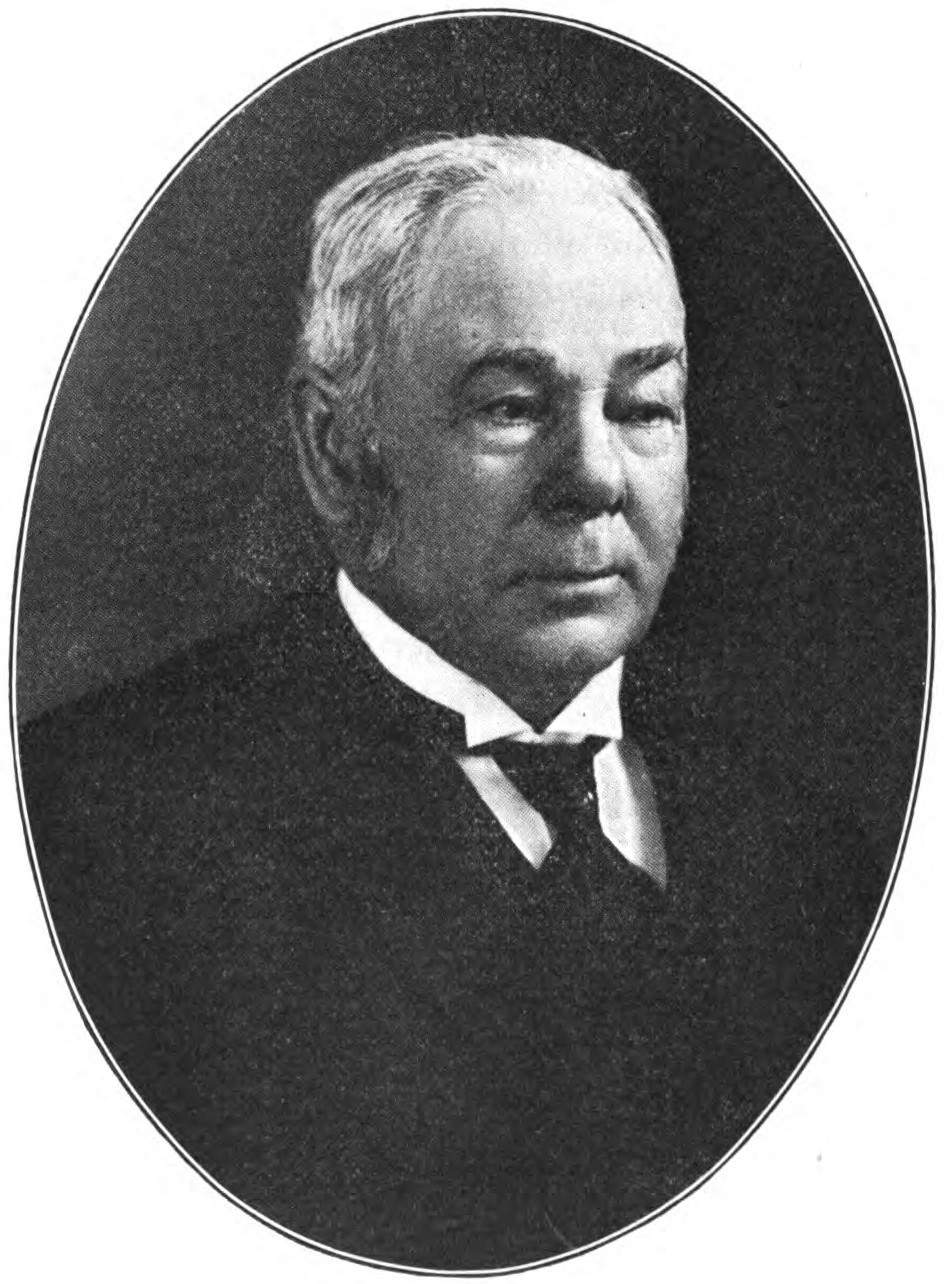
Killam in 1922

He was first elected to the House of Assembly in 1878 as the representative of Westmorland County. At the following general election, he failed to be returned until he was selected in September 1883, following the resignation of Pierre-Amand Landry, who was elected to the House of Commons in Ottawa, to fill his vacant seat. He was reelected after the general elections for several years. He resigned as a politician on 1 May 1897, two years before the expiration of his term.

After he retired from politics, he accepted the role of bridge inspector of the Intercolonial Railway and the Prince Edward Island Railway for 16 years. In 1898, he joined the American Railway Bridge and Building Association at Richmond, Virginia, and after ten years, was elected president.

Killam died in 20 August 1922, on Moncton. His house, called the Killam House, was registered to the Canadian Register of Historic Places based on a 2005 vote by the Moncton council after the house's owners wanted to replace it with a driveway.
