= Édouard S. Léger =

Canadian businessman and politician

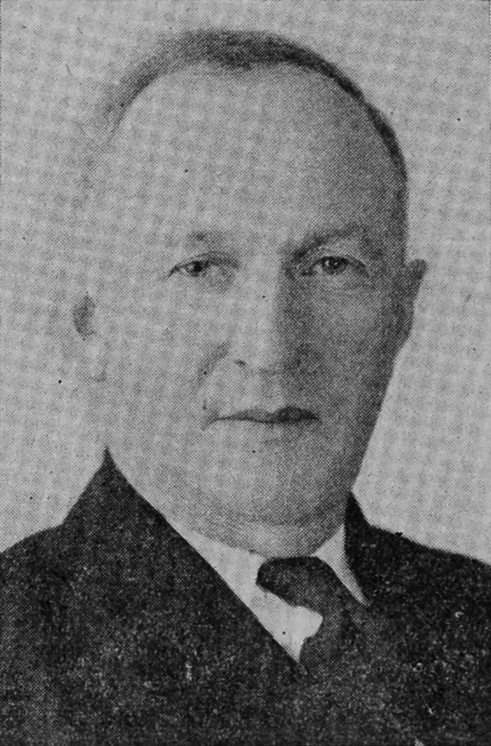
- Léger, pictured in a 1944 newspaper
- Born: May 27, 1890; Memramcook, New Brunswick, Canada
- Died: 1971 (aged 80–81); Memramcook, New Brunswick, Canada
- Education: St. Joseph's College
- Occupation: Businessman
- Political party: Liberal
- Spouse: Marie Landry
- Parent(s): Sylvain Léger & Rosalie LeBlanc

Édouard S. Léger (May 27, 1890 – 1971) was a Canadian businessman and politician in the Province of New Brunswick.

Léger was first elected to the Legislative Assembly in the 1939 New Brunswick general election as the Liberal Party candidate in the multi-member riding of Westmorland County. He was reelected in 1944 and again in 1948. He died in 1971.

Legislative Assembly of New Brunswick
| Preceded by Simeon Melanson | MLA for Westmorland County; 1939-1952 | Succeeded by J. Cléophas Léger |
