= Francis Sweeney =

Francis Sweeney may refer to:

- Francis E. Sweeney (1934–2011), American judge and politician
- Francis J. Sweeney (1862–1921), Canadian lawyer and politician
- Dr. Francis E. Sweeney (1894–1964), suspected to be the Cleveland Torso Murderer

== See also ==
- Frances Sweeney (1908–1944), American journalist and activist
