= McNevin =

McNevin is a surname derived from the Irish Mac Cnáimhín. Notable people with the surname include:

== McNevin ==
- Alexander McNevin (1885–1937), Canadian merchant and politician
- Bruce McNevin (1884–1951), Canadian politician
- William J. McNevin (born 1913), Canadian politician

== MacNevin ==
- Thomas MacNevin (1814–1848) - Irish writer
