= Frank Copp =

Canadian politician

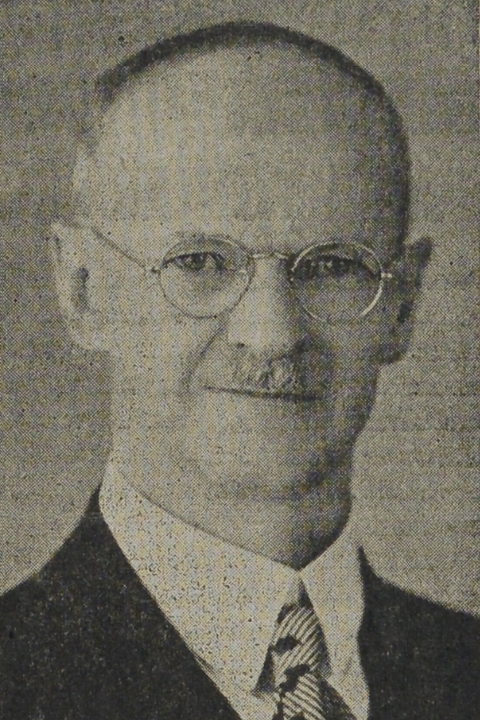
- Copp, pictured in a 1946 newspaper

Member of the Legislative Assembly of New Brunswick
- In office 1935–1952
- Constituency: Westmorland

Personal details
- Born: February 2, 1881 Bristol, New Brunswick, Canada
- Died: March 9, 1959 (aged 78) Port Elgin, New Brunswick
- Party: New Brunswick Liberal Association
- Spouse: Bertha (m. 1903)
- Education: Mount Allison University
- Occupation: Manufacturer

Frank Hubert Copp (February 2, 1881 – March 9, 1959) was a manufacturer and political figure in New Brunswick, Canada. He represented Westmorland County in the Legislative Assembly of New Brunswick as a Liberal member from 1935 to 1952.

He was born in Bristol, New Brunswick, the son of Adam Bliss Copp and Sarah Jane Oulton. He was educated at Mount Allison University. In 1903, he married Bertha Copp. Copp owned woollen mills and was also involved in fox ranching. He died in 1959.
