= David V. Allain =

Canadian businessman and politician

David Vital Allain (October 8, 1870 – April 15, 1945), son of Vital Allain and Mary Auger born in Neguac, New Brunswick, was a New Brunswick businessman and politician. He was married twice: first to Hélène Allain, and after her death to Emilie Sivret.

He was elected to the Legislative Assembly of New Brunswick where he served only one term (1917–1920). Elected in the 1917 general election, he sat as a Liberal member representing Northumberland County. He was defeated in the 1920 general election as well as in a by-election held in October 1921.
