= Herbert M. Wood =

Canadian politician

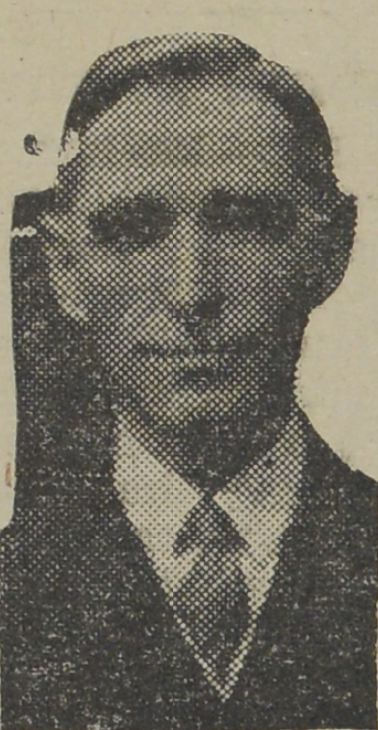
- Wood, pictured in a 1935 newspaper

Member of the Legislative Assembly of New Brunswick
- In office 1925–1935
- Constituency: Westmorland

Personal details
- Born: May 10, 1877 Sackville, New Brunswick
- Died: 1966 (aged 88–89) New Brunswick
- Party: Progressive Conservative Party of New Brunswick
- Spouse: Ethel S. Sumner
- Children: four
- Occupation: wholesale merchant

Herbert Mariner Wood (May 10, 1877 – 1966) was a Canadian politician. He served in the Legislative Assembly of New Brunswick as member of the Progressive Conservative party representing Westmorland County from 1925 to 1935.

He was the son of lawyer, entrepreneur, and politician Josiah Wood.

While attending Cornell University, Wood was a member of the school's ice hockey team and scored the first goal in the history of the program.
