= L. C. Dysart =

Canadian politician

Member of the Legislative Assembly of New Brunswick
- In office 1944–1952
- Constituency: Westmorland

Personal details
- Born: November 25, 1898 Grande-Digue, New Brunswick
- Died: December 8, 1956 (aged 58) Irishtown, New Brunswick
- Party: New Brunswick Liberal Association
- Spouse: Pauline Blanchard
- Occupation: marchinist

Langton Cutler Dysart (November 25, 1898 – December 8, 1956) was a Canadian politician. He served in the Legislative Assembly of New Brunswick as member of the Liberal party from 1944 to 1952.
