= Donald C. Harper =

Canadian politician

Member of the Legislative Assembly of New Brunswick
- In office 1952–1965
- Constituency: Westmorland

Personal details
- Born: November 27, 1904 Middle Sackville, New Brunswick
- Died: April 5, 1965 (aged 60) Sackville, New Brunswick
- Party: New Brunswick Liberal Association
- Spouse: Helen Hanson
- Occupation: farmer

Donald Chipman Harper (November 27, 1904 – May 4, 1965) was a Canadian politician. He served in the Legislative Assembly of New Brunswick from 1952 to 1965 as member of the Liberal party.
