= Medley G. Siddall =

Canadian politician

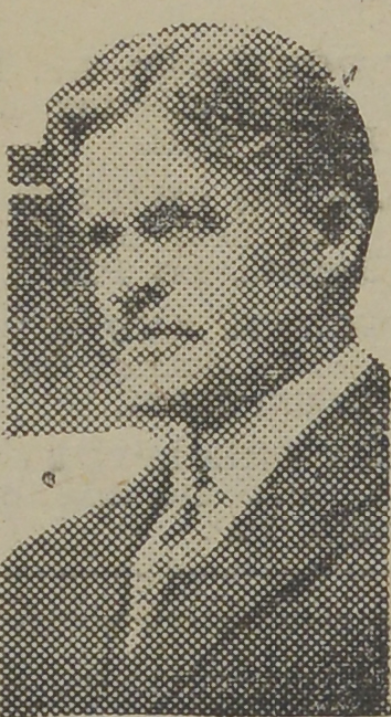
- Siddall, pictured in a 1935 newspaper

Member of the Legislative Assembly of New Brunswick
- In office 1925–1935
- Constituency: Westmorland

Personal details
- Born: January 20, 1875 Baie Verte, New Brunswick
- Died: August 31, 1964 (aged 89) Lancaster, New Brunswick
- Party: Progressive Conservative Party of New Brunswick
- Spouse: Linnie Richardson
- Occupation: farmer

Medley Godfrey Siddall (January 20, 1875 – August 31, 1964) was a Canadian politician. He served in the Legislative Assembly of New Brunswick as member of the Progressive Conservative party representing Westmorland County from 1925 to 1935.
