= Edward R. McDonald =

Canadian politician

Member of the Legislative Assembly of New Brunswick
- In office 1935–1939
- Constituency: Westmorland

Personal details
- Born: Edward Richard McDonald; September 24, 1871 Pointe-du-Chêne, New Brunswick, Canada
- Died: February 16, 1952 (aged 80) Shediac, New Brunswick, Canada
- Party: New Brunswick Liberal Association
- Spouse: Gertrude Ryan
- Children: 4
- Occupation: lawyer

Edward Richard McDonald (September 24, 1871 – February 16, 1952) was a Canadian lawyer, politician and inventor. He served as a lawyer for more than 50 years.

In 1926, both the United States Patent and Canadian Patent Offices issued similar patents to McDonald for a board game called Crossword Game. The wood tile game featuring letters of the alphabet with point value was played on a checker board and predates the first version of Scrabble by 12 years.

== Early life, education, family and recreation ==
Edward R. McDonald was born in Pointe-du-Chêne, New Brunswick in 1871 to Captain William McDonald and Catherine Costello McDonald. His father was of Irish descent and he was raised in the Catholic faith. He had an older sister, named Eliza born in 1870. He also had two half-brothers: Huntley and William McDonald. It is quite possible that his mother died during his childhood. Since his father was a sea captain, he and his sister were raised by their aunt Eliza and her husband Patrick Sweeney who was a Deputy Sheriff.

He attended public school and high school in Shediac, New Brunswick. He would then follow his father's calling of the sea for three years. After leaving the sea, he enrolled in a course of advance learning at St. Joseph's College in Memramcook, New Brunswick. After graduation, he began to study law in the office of James McQueen, (King's Counsel) in Shediac. Following his apprenticeship, he was admitted to the Bar of New Brunswick. But before committing to his new career as a lawyer, he travelled to Florida where he engaged in the real estate market for one year. He then made his way to Leadville, Colorado where he was employed in the gold mines for a couple of years before heading north of the border to Alberta to engage in ranching. He then became a gold mining prospector for a year in Porcupine, Ontario.

In 1908, he co-wrote a science fiction novel, The Mad Scientist: A Tale of the Future, with Raymond Alfred Léger. The book was published under the joint pen name of Raymond McDonald. The story line follows the increasingly dangerous interventions of the Mad Scientist in the dealings of US businessmen and of the US Government itself. The scientist's inclinations are socialist but, the authors are ambiguous about whether or not he is a menace. Many uncomfortable revelations – from fraud to conspiracies with German strikebreakers brought into the open by the scientist's numerous inventions, which include an anti-gravity device capable of levitating battleships to escape enemy torpedoes. Raymond Léger was a highly literate man who developed Jules Verne-like concepts of travel, rockets, spaceships and houses with wings.

At the age of 39, he married Annie Gertrude Ryan, age 21 on April 30, 1912. Their nuptials took place in Saint John, NB, the hometown of his bride. Raymond Alfred Léger, with whom he co-wrote the science fiction novel 4 years earlier was a witness at their wedding. They had four children, one son, Edward Ronald (b. 1920) and three daughters, Gertrude, Dorothy Mildred (b. 1914) and Elizabeth (Betty), b. 1926–27?).

Beside motoring, he was an avid sailor/yachtsman. The Shediac Bay Yacht Club was founded in 1933 by Donald Cowl of New York/Shediac Cape, New Brunswick, and Hal Weldon, a Montreal banker and Shediac area native. McDonald was among the first directors of the club which also included Allan S. Tait and Donald S. Smith.

The late Senator J. Anthony McDonald of Shediac and Toronto was his cousin. Edward McDonald is the great-grandfather of Oscar-winning director, screenwriter and Disney animator Chris Williams, and Todd McLellan, a former professional ice hockey player, Stanley Cup winning assistant-coach with the Detroit Red Wings in 2008, and current head coach of the Detroit Red Wings hockey team.

== Law practice ==
McDonald practiced law in New Brunswick for more than 50 years, appearing before both criminal and civil courts. During his career, he acquired knowledge in all other branches of the law. His practice embraced all the courts from the lowest to the highest. During the 1930s, he was appointed a King's Counsel. As a counsel, his services were retained in many cases. He remained active as a barrister in the province of New Brunswick and on many occasions before the Nova Scotia Courts until a few months prior to his death when illness struck.

== Political life ==
Conjointly with his law practice, he was also a very active politician on the local and provincial scene. He served as mayor of Shediac for three terms (1908–1911, 1915–1916, 1926–1929) as well as an alderman on the Shediac Town council for two decades. During his first mandate as mayor, the wharf in Pointe-du-Chêne, New Brunswick, was built in 1910–1911. In addition, he also served as town clerk for many year and councillor for the Shediac Parish at Westmorland Municipality Council for sixteen years. In provincial politics, he was elected in 1935 as a Liberal member to the New Brunswick Legislative Assembly (MLA) for Westmorland County, serving a four-year term during which he played a prominent role in the debates of the House and served in several committees.

== Crossword Game ==
In 1925, McDonald invented a board game called Crossword Game. The wood tile game featuring letters of the alphabet with point value was played on a checker board. He hired the patent agency, Fetherstonhaugh & Co of Toronto to prepare the patent submissions. His Crossword Game was granted a US patent, number 1591639 on July 6, 1926, and a Canadian Patent, number CA266459 on December 7, 1926.

McDonald's Crossword Game predates the first version of the Scrabble Word Game by 12 years, although the two games are not known to be related. The initial version of the Scrabble Word Game was invented in 1938 by American architect Alfred Mosher Butts and was called Lexiko. The version that would later become available commercially was revised by James Brunot in 1948. Edward McDonald's Crossword Game does differ significantly from Scrabble. The board is 13 spaces square for the Crossword Game compared to 15 spaces square for Scrabble. Each player has a set of 26 letter tiles, featuring the entire alphabet. Each set of tiles are of different colours. At the beginning of the game, the tiles are positioned in the two rows nearest each player, similar to chess pieces. Consonants have various point values as indicated on the tiles, while vowels have no point values. The players form words by moving tiles. Consonants are removed when a word has been formed and the score recorded. Vowels remain in place for the duration of the game. Players score double the point value for the use of an opponent letter in forming a new word. The complete instructions for the game are quite complex and are printed on 3 pages. It remains unknown if McDonald's Crossword Game was ever marketed since no original prototype are known to exist. McDonald's daughter, Betty Carvell. who was born around the same year the game was invented recalls during her childhood that family acquaintances would come to their house to play on a wooden board game with letter tiles on the kitchen table with her father.

The Scrabble-like board game invented by McDonald is documented by various sources, including the Province of New Brunswick website, the New Brunswick Book of Everything, and New Brunswick Facts, Firsts & Innovations. It was only in 2014, when Pierre Cormier, a member of the Chamber of commerce for the town of Shediac, initiated a search that eventually led to the find of the patents themselves. Until then, the connection with the Crossword Game with the small town of Shediac had remained untold. In 2016, the town of Shediac would pay homage to McDonald by organizing several activities to celebrate the 90th anniversary of his Crossword Game. The Chamber of Commerce commissioned a narrative painting of the inventor and his game that was created by Canadian artist Alvin Richard. During a press conference held on June 8, 2016, in Shediac, John Chew, co-president of the North American Scrabble Players Association announced that Hasbro, the current owner of the Scrabble Game, would be supplying a large number of games to the town to demonstrate their support for the initiative. Many Scrabble-related activities were revealed for the summer and fall of 2016. The town of Shediac would go on to form the first certified Scrabble Club in the Atlantic provinces, and hosted an International Scrabble Tournament from September 30 to October 2, with Mr Chew presiding over the event. The first tournament was won by Jackson Smylie of Toronto, a co-winner of the North American Scrabble Championship for students in 2011. On September 17, Shediac hosted a roaring 1920s Gatsby themed night in conjunction with Scrabble related activities, highlighting the flapper fashion period when McDonald's game was invented. Shediac is known as the Lobster Capital of the World and has recently claimed the title of The Scrabble Capital of Canada. Giant black and white letter tiles spelling "Shediac" were installed at the western entrance of the town alongside the 90-ton sculpture called (perhaps inaccurately) The World's Largest Lobster.

In conjunction with the celebration of Canada's 150th Birthday, "Ingenious", a book written by the Governor General of Canada, his Excellency The Right Honourable David Johnston and Tom Jenkins was released on March 27, 2017. Edward R. McDonald's Crossword Game is included in an article entitled, "Wood-tile Crossword". The illustrated volume celebrates Canadian innovations whose widespread adoption has made the world a better place.

== Death ==
Edward R. McDonald died on Saturday February 16, 1952, at his home in Shediac, of general arteriosclerosis.
