= Merville A. Oulton =

Canadian politician

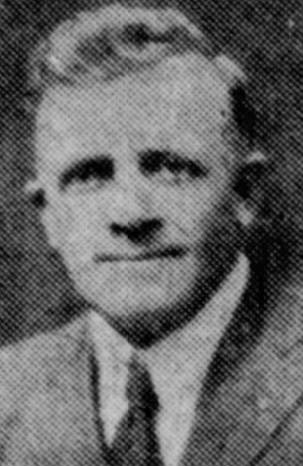

Member of the Legislative Assembly of New Brunswick
- In office 1925–1930
- Constituency: Westmorland

Personal details
- Born: July 22, 1888 Jolicure, New Brunswick
- Died: June 26, 1953 (aged 64) Saint John, New Brunswick
- Party: Progressive Conservative Party of New Brunswick
- Spouse: Elizabeth Wells
- Occupation: physician, surgeon

Merville Allen Oulton (July 22, 1888 – June 26, 1953) was a Canadian politician. He served in the Legislative Assembly of New Brunswick as member of the Conservative Party representing Westmorland County from 1925 to 1930.
