= Frederick L. Estabrooks =

Canadian politician (1876–1974)

Fred L. Estabrooks

Member of the Legislative Assembly of New Brunswick
- In office 1921–1925
- Constituency: Westmorland

Personal details
- Born: October 16, 1876 Middle Sackville, New Brunswick
- Died: January 31, 1974 (aged 97) Moncton, New Brunswick
- Party: New Brunswick Liberal Association
- Spouse: Mary Ethel Steeves
- Children: two
- Occupation: farmer, produce exporter

Frederick Leslie Estabrooks (October 16, 1876 – January 31, 1974) was a Canadian politician. He served in the Legislative Assembly of New Brunswick as member of the Liberal party representing Westmorland County from 1921 to 1925.
