= Simeon Melanson =

Canadian politician

Member of the Legislative Assembly of New Brunswick
- In office 1935–1939
- Constituency: Westmorland

Personal details
- Born: April 14, 1873 Pré-d'en-Haut, New Brunswick
- Died: August 22, 1964 (aged 91) Moncton, New Brunswick
- Party: New Brunswick Liberal Association
- Spouse: Marguerite Belliveau
- Occupation: general merchant

Simeon Melanson (April 14, 1873 – August 22, 1964) was a Canadian politician. He served in the Legislative Assembly of New Brunswick as member of the Liberal party from 1935 to 1939.
