= A. Chase Fawcett =

Canadian politician

Member of the Legislative Assembly of New Brunswick
- In office 1921–1925
- Constituency: Westmorland

Personal details
- Born: Albert Charles Fawcett; April 5, 1863 Upper Sackville, New Brunswick
- Died: January 1, 1934 (aged 70) Sackville, New Brunswick
- Party: United Farmers of New Brunswick
- Spouse(s): Maud Tingley; Lucretia Smith
- Children: five
- Occupation: farmer, agricultural products and fertilizer business

Albert Charles "Chase" Fawcett (April 5, 1863 – January 1, 1934) was a Canadian politician. He served in the Legislative Assembly of New Brunswick as member of the United Farmers party representing Westmorland County from 1921 to 1925.
