= Lewis Smith (politician) =

Canadian politician

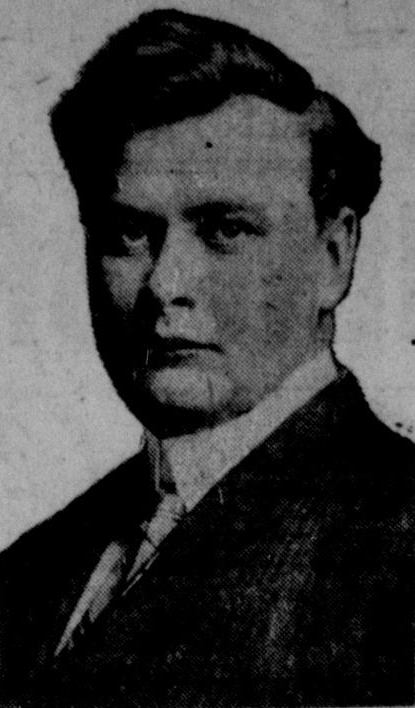
- Smith in a 1928 newspaper

Member of the Legislative Assembly of New Brunswick
- In office 1930–1935
- Constituency: Westmorland

Personal details
- Born: May 11, 1880 Lower Coverdale, New Brunswick
- Died: January 1, 1950 (aged 69) Bridgedale, New Brunswick
- Party: Progressive Conservative Party of New Brunswick
- Spouse: A. I. Ruby Tessier
- Occupation: farmer

Lewis Smith (May 11, 1880 – January 1, 1950) was a Canadian politician. He served in the Legislative Assembly of New Brunswick as member of the Conservative party representing Albert County from 1917 to 1930 and Westmorland County from 1930 to 1935. He served as Albert County's Minister of Agriculture.
