= Josiah Wood =

Canadian politician (1843–1927)

The Honourable Josiah Wood
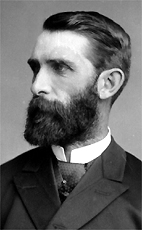

13th Lieutenant Governor of New Brunswick
- In office 6 March 1912 – 29 June 1917
- Monarch: George V
- Governors General: The Duke of Connaught and Strathearn; The Duke of Devonshire
- Premier: James K. Flemming; George J. Clarke; James A. Murray; Walter E. Foster
- Preceded by: Lemuel John Tweedie
- Succeeded by: Gilbert Ganong

Senator for Westmorland, New Brunswick
- In office 1895–1912
- Appointed by: Mackenzie Bowell

Member of the Canadian Parliament for Westmorland
- In office 1882–1895
- Preceded by: Albert James Smith
- Succeeded by: Henry Absalom Powell

Personal details
- Born: 18 April 1843 Sackville, New Brunswick, Canada
- Died: 13 May 1927 (aged 84) Sackville, New Brunswick, Canada
- Party: Conservative
- Spouse: Laura S. Trueman (m. 1874)
- Relations: Frank Bunting Black, son-in-law
- Children: 4 daughters, 2 sons

Josiah Wood (18 April 1843 – 13 May 1927) was a Canadian lawyer, entrepreneur, mayor, parliamentarian, and the 13th Lieutenant Governor of the province of New Brunswick. He was born in Sackville, New Brunswick in 1843.

== Personal life ==
He was the son of Mariner Wood and his wife Louisa Trueman of Point de Bute. On 14 January 1874, Wood married Laura S. Trueman of Sackville. His son, Herbert M. Wood served in the Legislative Assembly of New Brunswick from 1925 to 1935. He died on 13 May 1927 in Sackville, New Brunswick.

== Education ==
After attending public school in Sackville, he entered Mount Allison Academy; later he became a member of the first graduating class of the newly founded university, then known as Mount Allison Wesleyan College. In 1866 he was awarded a Master of Arts degree with admission to the Bar of New Brunswick occurring later in the year.

== Career ==
He entered the family business and built Mariner Wood & Sons into a company involved in retail, wholesale, shipbuilding, shipping, farming and lumbering, banking, real estate, including a large farm in Midgic plus the Wood Block in downtown Sackville. To this was later added investments in a variety of enterprises in Moncton.

== Political offices held ==
- As a Conservative, he served three terms as a Member of Parliament in the House of Commons of Canada, representing the New Brunswick riding of Westmorland, winning the seat in the elections of 1882, 1887 and 1891.
- On 5 August 1895, he was appointed to the Senate of Canada on the recommendation of Prime Minister Mackenzie Bowell. He resigned from the Senate on 12 March 1912 after being appointed Lieutenant Governor of New Brunswick.
- On 12 February 1903, he became the first mayor of the newly incorporated town of Sackville, New Brunswick.
- On 6 March 1912, he was appointed Lieutenant Governor of New Brunswick, a position he held until 1917.

== Electoral record ==
1882 Canadian federal election: Westmoreland
Party	Candidate	Votes	%	±%
Conservative	Josiah Wood	2,620	54.5	+11.7
Liberal	Albert James Smith	2,188	45.5	-11.7

1887 Canadian federal election: Westmoreland
Party	Candidate	Votes	%	±%
Conservative	Josiah Wood	3,252	54.5	n/c
Liberal	Henry Emmerson	2,710	45.5	n/c

1891 Canadian federal election: Westmoreland
Party	Candidate	Votes	%	±%
Conservative	Josiah Wood	4,205	67.2	+12.7
Liberal	William F. George	2,057	32.8	-12.7
