= Ernest A. Smith =

Canadian politician

Ernest Albert Smith (June 20, 1864 – June 1, 1952) was a dentist, merchant and political figure in New Brunswick, Canada. He represented Westmorland County in the Legislative Assembly of New Brunswick from 1916 to 1920 as a Liberal member.

He was born in Shediac, New Brunswick, the son of Edward J. Smith and Amelia Robb. He was educated at the Pennsylvania Dental College where he received a D.D.S. In 1896, he married Euphemia Russel. Smith also became a lumber dealer and general merchant.

He served as mayor of Shediac in 1906 and 1907. Smith was first elected to the Legislative Assembly by defeating Patrick G. Mahoney in a 1916 by-election held after Mahoney was named to the provincial cabinet and so forced to present himself again for reelection. Appointed to the Executive Council, he served as Minister of Lands and Mines from April 4, 1917 to September 14, 1920.

Smith was a member of the local Masonic Lodge. He ran unsuccessfully for a federal seat in 1921.

His uncle Albert James Smith was a premier of New Brunswick who also served in the House of Commons. He died in 1952, aged 87.

New Brunswick provincial government of Walter E. Foster
Cabinet post (1)
Predecessor	Office	Successor
Arthur R. Slipp	'Minister of Lands and Mines'; 1914-1917	Clifford W. Robinson
