= Antoine Joseph Léger =

Canadian politician (1880–1950)

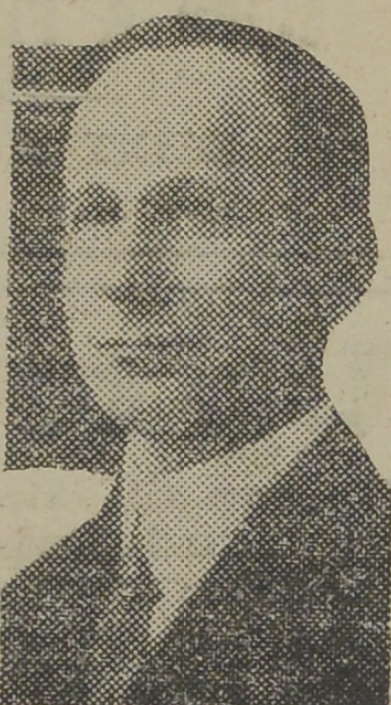
- Léger, pictured in a 1935 newspaper
- Born: October 16, 1880; Memramcook, New Brunswick
- Died: April 7, 1950 (aged 69); Moncton, New Brunswick
- Education: St. Joseph's College
- Occupations: Lawyer, author, politician
- Political party: Conservative
- Spouses: Alvina Léger; Marie Bourgeois
- Children: 5 children
- Parent(s): Julien T. Léger & Marie LeBlanc

Antoine Joseph Léger (October 16, 1880 – April 7, 1950) was a lawyer, author and political figure of Acadian descent in New Brunswick. He represented Westmorland County in the Legislative Assembly of New Brunswick from 1925 to 1935 as a Conservative member and then represented the division of L'Acadie in the Senate of Canada from 1935 to 1950.

Léger was born in Memramcook, New Brunswick. He was educated there and at the St. Joseph's College. Léger then attended the normal school in Fredericton and worked for several months in Quebec. He returned to New Brunswick to article in law with Alfred LaForest in Edmundston, was called to the Bar of New Brunswick in 1907 and set up practice in Moncton.

Antoine Léger ran unsuccessfully for a seat in the Legislative Assembly of New Brunswick in 1917 but won in the 1925 New Brunswick general election as a declared candidate in the Westmorland County Electoral District for the then unofficial Progressive Conservative Party. On September 14, 1925, new Premier John B. M. Baxter appointed him to his Cabinet as the Provincial Secretary-Treasurer (Minister of Finance). Léger held the position until July 16, 1935, when he was defeated in a bid for reelection.

On August 14, 1935, Canadian Prime Minister Richard B. Bennett appointed Antoine Léger to the Senate of Canada.

Léger published Les grandes lignes de l'histoire de la Société l'Assomption, the history of an Acadian association, and wrote articles on Acadian history as well as several historical novels.

== Personal life and death ==
He married twice, first to Alvina Léger. Widowed, he later married Marie Bourgeois (née Drisdelle).

Léger died in Moncton at the age of 69, from an intracerebral hemorrhage.

New Brunswick provincial government of John B. M. Baxter
Cabinet post (1)
Predecessor	Office	Successor
Judson Hetherington	'Provincial Secretary-Treasurer'; 1925–1935	Clovis T. Richard
