= Reid McManus =

Canadian politician

Member of the Legislative Assembly of New Brunswick
- In office 1921–1925
- Constituency: Westmorland

Personal details
- Born: October 1, 1874 Memramcook, New Brunswick
- Died: November 11, 1948 (aged 74) Moncton, New Brunswick
- Party: New Brunswick Liberal Association
- Spouse: Margaret Macdonald
- Children: seven
- Occupation: Civil engineer and contractor

James Thomas Reid McManus (October 1, 1874 – November 11, 1948) was a Canadian politician. He served in the Legislative Assembly of New Brunswick as member of the Liberal party representing Westmorland County from 1921 to 1925.
