= Edward J. Smith (Canadian politician) =

Canadian politician

Edward John Smith (1819–1903) was a merchant and political figure in New Brunswick, Canada. He represented Westmorland County from 1875 to 1878 as a Liberal member.

He was born in Shediac, New Brunswick, the son of Thomas Edward Smith, a descendant of United Empire Loyalists, and was educated there. In 1844, he married Mary Bell. He married Amelia E. Robb in 1856 after his first wife's death.

His son Ernest also served in the provincial assembly. His brother Albert James was a former New Brunswick premier who also served in the Canadian House of Commons.
