= Francis C. McGrath =

Canadian politician

Francis C. McGrath (February 20, 1875 – November 4, 1939) was a New Brunswick physician and political figure. He was born in the village of Norway, Prince Edward Island and died in Newcastle, New Brunswick.

He was elected to the Legislative Assembly of New Brunswick where he served only one term from 1917 to 1920. Sitting as a Liberal member representing Northumberland County, he was defeated in the 1920 general election and did not reoffer subsequently, although he later served as a Newcastle town councillor and school trustee.
