= Joseph Lytle Moore =

Canadian politician

Joseph Lytle Moore (1826 – December 1, 1871) was an Irish-born lawyer and political figure in New Brunswick. He represented Westmorland in the Legislative Assembly of New Brunswick from 1867 to 1872.

He was born in Donegal, the son of Robert Moore and Catherine Osborne. Moore was educated at King's College in Fredericton. He was called to the New Brunswick bar in 1857. Moore was elected to the assembly in an 1867 by-election held after Albert James Smith was elected to the House of Commons. He died at Amherst, Nova Scotia.
