= William J. McNevin =

Canadian politician (1913–1982)

Member of the Legislative Assembly of New Brunswick
- In office 1970–1974
- Constituency: Westmorland

Personal details
- Born: March 23, 1913 Moncton, New Brunswick
- Died: April 13, 1982 (aged 69) Moncton, New Brunswick
- Party: New Brunswick Liberal Association
- Spouse: Elise Edith Bourque
- Children: 1

William John McNevin (March 23, 1913 – April 13, 1982) was a Canadian politician. He served in the Legislative Assembly of New Brunswick from 1970 to 1974 as member of the Liberal party.
