= Fred A. Fowlie =

Member of the Legislative Assembly of New Brunswick
- In office 1921–1925 Serving with John S. Martin, Abram V. Vanderbeck, John Vanderbeck, Charles Joseph Morrissy
- Constituency: Northumberland

Personal details
- Born: May 9, 1866 Little Branch, New Brunswick
- Died: June 8, 1963 (aged 97) Newcastle, New Brunswick
- Party: Independent
- Spouse: Minnie Robertson (m. 1895)
- Children: one
- Occupation: Farmer and mill owner

Frederick Archibald Fowlie (May 9, 1866 – June 8, 1963) was a Canadian politician. He served in the Legislative Assembly of New Brunswick from 1921 to 1925 as an independent member. He died in 1963, aged 97.
