= Louis-Auguste Dugal =

Canadian politician

Member of the New Brunswick Legislative Assembly for Madawaska
- In office 1912–1920 Serving with Joseph-Enoil Michaud, Joseph H. Pelletier
- Preceded by: Charles L. Cyr
- Succeeded by: Donat L. Daigle

Personal details
- Born: August 8, 1869 Rivière-du-Loup, Quebec, Canada
- Died: October 20, 1926 (aged 57) Edmundston, New Brunswick, Canada
- Party: Liberal Party of New Brunswick
- Occupation: contractor, merchant

Louis-Auguste Dugal (August 8, 1869 – October 20, 1926) was a Canadian politician who was elected to the Legislative Assembly of New Brunswick in the 1912 New Brunswick general election. He represented Madawaska County as a member of the Liberal Party of New Brunswick, and served as Leader of the Opposition from 1912 to 1917. He was a general contractor and merchant, and served as mayor of Edmundston, New Brunswick.

Dugal was born in Rivière-du-Loup, Quebec. He married Philomène Gagné in 1891 and had three children.
