= Joseph Laurence Black =

Canadian politician

Joseph Laurence Black (January 12, 1829 – March 12, 1907) was a businessman and political figure in New Brunswick, Canada. He represented Westmorland County in the Legislative Assembly of New Brunswick from 1878 to 1882 and from 1886 to 1890.

He was born in Amherst, Nova Scotia, the son of Josiah Black and Hannah Embree, and was educated there and at Sackville, New Brunswick. He worked as a clerk in his uncle's store before opening his own general store. He later acquired lumber mills, farmland and a lobster factory. In 1857, he married Jane Humphrey. After her death, in 1862 he married Mary Ann Snowball, the sister of Jabez Bunting Snowball. In 1863, he was named a justice of the peace. In the assembly, he supported the construction of the New Brunswick and Prince Edward Island Railway. Black also served on the executive committee of the board of governors for Mount Allison College, now called Mount Allison University. He died of pneumonia in Sackville at the age of 78.

His brother Thomas Reuben served in the Nova Scotia assembly and the Canadian senate.
