= Joseph A. McQueen =

Canadian politician

Joseph Avard McQueen (November 10, 1862 – November 16, 1918 ) was a merchant and political figure in New Brunswick. He represented Westmorland County in the Legislative Assembly of New Brunswick from 1891 to 1892 as a Liberal member.

He was born in Point de Bute, New Brunswick, the son of Angus McQueen, and educated at Mount Allison College. He was elected to the provincial assembly in an 1891 by-election held after two members elected in the general election were unseated after an appeal.

Son of Angus McQueen.
