= William F. Humphrey =

Canadian politician

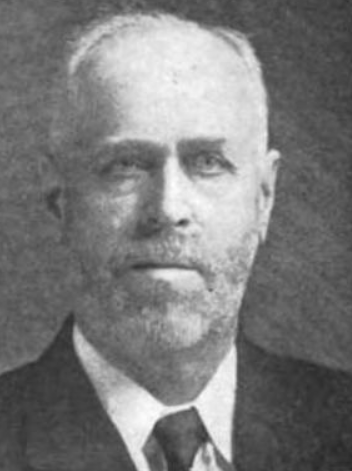

Member of the Legislative Assembly of New Brunswick
- Constituency: Westmorland
- In office 1899–1903
- In office 1912–1917

Personal details
- Born: William Flintoff Humphrey; November 13, 1860 Moncton, New Brunswick
- Died: June 5, 1928 (aged 67) Moncton, New Brunswick
- Party: Independent
- Spouse: E. Bessie Wallace (m. 1885)
- Children: 5
- Occupation: Manufacturer

William Flintoff Humphrey (November 13, 1860 – June 5, 1928) was a Canadian politician.

== Biography ==
William F. Humphrey was born in Moncton on November 13, 1860. He married E. Bessie Wallace on April 16, 1885 and they had five children.

He served in the Legislative Assembly of New Brunswick from 1899 to 1903 and from 1912 to 1917 as an independent member. He died in 1928.
