= Angus McQueen =

Canadian politician

Angus McQueen (c. 1828 – October 18, 1899) was a merchant and political figure in New Brunswick. He represented Westmorland County in the Legislative Assembly of New Brunswick from 1866 to 1878.

He was born in Little Harbour, Pictou County, Nova Scotia and later settled at Point de Bute, New Brunswick. He married Margaret Avard. McQueen was named as a member of New Brunswick's Executive Council in 1872 and served until 1878. After he retired from politics, McQueen served as high sheriff for Westmorland County.

His son Joseph later served as a member of the provincial assembly.
