= Samuel Black Hunter =

Canadian politician

Member of the Legislative Assembly of New Brunswick
- In office 1917–1925
- Constituency: York

Personal details
- Born: November 5, 1855 Kingsclear, New Brunswick
- Died: September 20, 1935 (aged 79) McAdam, New Brunswick
- Party: New Brunswick Liberal Association
- Spouse: Victoria Kitchen
- Children: four
- Occupation: produce merchant

Samuel Black Hunter (November 5, 1855 – September 20, 1935) was a Canadian politician. He served in the Legislative Assembly of New Brunswick as member of the Liberal party representing York County from 1917 to 1925.
