= Thomas Pickard (politician) =

Canadian politician

Thomas Pickard (1819 – 1895) was a college teacher and political figure in New Brunswick. He represented Westmorland County in the Legislative Assembly of New Brunswick from 1875 to 1878 as a Liberal member.

He was born in Fredericton, New Brunswick, the son of Thomas Pickard, a merchant there, and was educated at the Wesleyan University in Connecticut. In 1854, he married Mary Dixon. He was professor of mathematics at Mount Allison College in Sackville from 1848 to 1869.

His former house in Sackville is preserved as a Local Historic Place.
