= Cléophas Léger =

Canadian Liberal Party politician

Member of the Legislative Assembly of New Brunswick
- In office 1952–1974
- Constituency: Westmorland

Personal details
- Born: September 10, 1913 Memramcook, New Brunswick
- Died: April 9, 1991 (aged 77) Moncton, New Brunswick
- Party: New Brunswick Liberal Association
- Spouse: Blanche Johnson

Joseph Cléophas Léger (September 10, 1913 – April 9, 1991) was a Canadian politician. He served in the Legislative Assembly of New Brunswick from 1952 to 1974 as member of the Liberal party.
