= W. Wynn Meldrum =

Canadian politician

Member of the Legislative Assembly of New Brunswick
- In office 1965–1974
- Constituency: Westmorland

Personal details
- Born: May 28, 1916 Simpson's Corner, Nova Scotia
- Died: February 13, 2013 (aged 88) Sackville, New Brunswick
- Party: New Brunswick Liberal Association
- Spouse: Dorothy Ferne Downey
- Children: 2
- Occupation: lawyer

Wendell Wynn Meldrum (June 27, 1924 – February 13, 2013) was a Canadian politician. He served in the Legislative Assembly of New Brunswick from 1965 to 1974 as a member of the Liberal Party.
