= Joseph E. Leblanc =

Canadian politician

Joseph E. LeBlanc

Member of the Legislative Assembly of New Brunswick
- In office 1952–1974
- Constituency: Westmorland

Personal details
- Born: May 28, 1916 Shediac, New Brunswick
- Died: May 23, 1979 (aged 62) Shediac, New Brunswick
- Party: New Brunswick Liberal Association
- Spouse: Gisèle Richard
- Occupation: businessman

Joseph E. LeBlanc (May 28, 1916 – May 23, 1979) was a Canadian politician. He served in the Legislative Assembly of New Brunswick from 1952 to 1974 as member of the Liberal party.
