= John L. Peck =

Canadian politician

Member of the Legislative Assembly of New Brunswick
- In office 1917–1927
- Constituency: Albert

Personal details
- Born: July 6, 1857 Hopewell Hill, New Brunswick
- Died: January 14, 1927 (aged 69) Moncton, New Brunswick
- Party: Conservative Party of New Brunswick
- Spouse: Minnie F. Bishop
- Children: three
- Occupation: Banker and lumber merchant

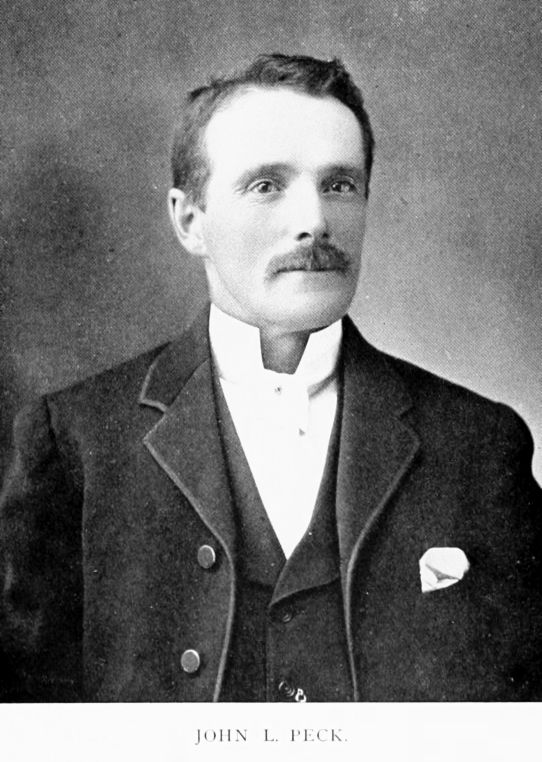

John Lewis Peck (July 6, 1857 – January 14, 1927) was a Canadian politician. He served in the Legislative Assembly of New Brunswick as member of the Albert party representing Albert County from 1917 to 1927.
