= Ambroise D. Richard =

Canadian politician

Ambroise D. Richard (February 6, 1850 – 1917) was a lawyer and political figure of Acadian descent in New Brunswick, Canada. He represented Westmorland County in the Legislative Assembly of New Brunswick from 1895 to 1899 as a Conservative member.

He was born in Memramcook, New Brunswick, the son of David Richard and Julie Ouelette. Richard was educated at St. Joseph's College there, at St. Dunstan's College in Prince Edward Island and at Boston University. He was called to the bar in 1879. In 1884, he married Lizzie V. Holt. Richard served on the municipal council for Dorchester and was a commissioner for Westmorland County. He was a member of the Legislative Council from 1882 to 1891. He ran unsuccessfully for a seat in the provincial assembly in 1892 after being named solicitor general.
