= Percy Mitton =

Canadian politician

Member of the Legislative Assembly of New Brunswick
- In office 1960–1970
- Constituency: Westmorland

Personal details
- Born: May 10, 1911 Upper Coverdale, New Brunswick
- Died: 1991 (aged 79–80)
- Party: New Brunswick Liberal Association
- Spouse: Kathleen Nellie Rockingham
- Children: 3
- Occupation: farmer and lumberman

Percy Elmer Mitton (May 10, 1911 – 1991) was a Canadian politician. He served in the Legislative Assembly of New Brunswick from 1960 to 1970 as member of the Liberal party.
