= Arthur R. Slipp =

Canadian politician (1869–1958)

Member of the Legislative Assembly of New Brunswick
- In office 1908–1917 Serving with Henry W. Woods
- Constituency: Queens

Personal details
- Born: September 10, 1869 Hampstead, New Brunswick
- Died: February 6, 1958 (aged 88) Fredericton, New Brunswick
- Party: Conservative
- Spouse: Elizabeth F. Logan (m. 1899)
- Children: 3
- Education: Boston University (LLB)
- Occupation: Lawyer

Arthur Reid Slipp (September 10, 1869 – February 6, 1958) was a Canadian politician. He served in the Legislative Assembly of New Brunswick as a member from Queens County.
