= David A. Stewart (politician) =

Canadian politician (1874–1947)

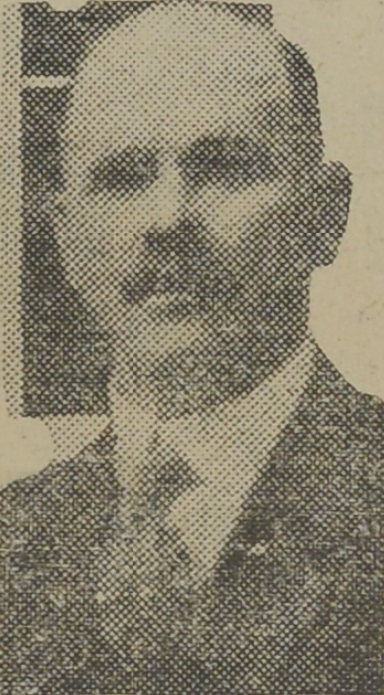
- Stewart, pictured in a 1935 newspaper

Member of the Legislative Assembly of New Brunswick
- In office 1912–1917; 1921–1935; 1939–1944
- Constituency: Restigouche

Personal details
- Born: David Alexander Stewart; May 23, 1874 Point La Nim, New Brunswick
- Died: March 20, 1947 (aged 72) Campbellton, New Brunswick
- Party: Progressive Conservative Party of New Brunswick
- Spouse: Margaret MacGorman
- Occupation: contractor

David Alexander Stewart (May 23, 1874 – March 20, 1947) was a Canadian politician. He served in the Legislative Assembly of New Brunswick as member of the Progressive Conservative party representing Restigouche County.
