= Leon Rideout (Canadian politician) =

Canadian politician

Leon B. Rideout

Member of the Legislative Assembly of New Brunswick
- In office 1957–1960; 1963–1970
- Constituency: Gloucester

Personal details
- Born: April 8, 1920 Grand Falls, New Brunswick
- Died: 1987 (aged 66–67)
- Party: Progressive Conservative Party of New Brunswick
- Spouse: Eleanor Joyce Wright
- Children: 6
- Occupation: factory manager

Leon Burton Rideout (April 8, 1920 – 1987) was a Canadian politician. He served in the Legislative Assembly of New Brunswick as member of the Progressive Conservative party.
