= Frank Bunting Black =

Canadian politician (1869–1945)

The Hon. Frank Bunting Black

Senator for Westmorland, New Brunswick
- In office 1921–1945
- Appointed by: Arthur Meighen

Personal details
- Born: February 28, 1869 Sackville, New Brunswick
- Died: February 28, 1945 (aged 76)
- Party: Conservative

Frank Bunting Black, VD (February 28, 1869 – February 28, 1945) was a merchant and political figure in New Brunswick, Canada. He represented Westmorland County in the Legislative Assembly of New Brunswick from 1912 to 1916 as a Conservative member. Black went on to represent the division of Westmorland in the Senate of Canada from 1921 to 1945.

He was born in Sackville, New Brunswick, the son of Joseph L. Black and Mary Ann Snowball, and was educated at Mount Allison University. He took over the operation of the family store after his father's death in 1907. Black served as mayor of Sackville in 1919. He married Eleanor, the daughter of Josiah Wood.

A long time reserve officer in the Princess Louise 8th Hussars (NB), he signed up for active duty, at the age of 46, in 1914. He went overseas as a major, was wounded twice in France, won several important medals, and an Honour, the Order of St. Stanislaw (for valour), from the Russian Ministry of Defence. he was soon promoted to full colonel and in 1917 was the first eastern Canadian to be gazetted a brigadier general on the field, but because of the death of his brother Captain J. W. S. Black in late 1916 chose instead to revert to reserve status so as to manage the family business. In 1926 he was named the 8th Hussars' first honorary colonel.
