= 1886 New Brunswick general election =

Canadian provincial election

The 1886 New Brunswick general election was held on 26 April 1886, to elect 41 members to the 26th New Brunswick Legislative Assembly, the governing house of the province of New Brunswick, Canada. The election was held before the adoption of party labels.

In 1883, the Opposition led by Andrew George Blair defeated the government of Daniel L. Hanington in a non-confidence vote which resulted in the government's resignation and Blair being asked to form a government. The 1886 election saw Blair's government returned to office. Of forty-one MLAs, thirty-three supported the government, and eight formed the opposition.

New Brunswick general election, 1886
Party	Leader	Seats
Government (Liberal)	Andrew George Blair	33
Opposition (Conservative)	Daniel L. Hanington	8
