= Middle Sackville, New Brunswick =

Community in New Brunswick, Canada

Coordinates: 45°55′20.9″N 64°21′43.5″W

Middle Sackville in New Brunswick

Middle Sackville is a Canadian rural community in Westmorland County, New Brunswick. Located in the Sackville Parish approximately 3 kilometres southwest of Sackville

== History ==
It is home to the historic Middle Braevale Manor and one of the province's largest potteries Atlantic Pottery.

== See also ==
- List of communities in New Brunswick
