= Scott D. Guptill =

Canadian politician

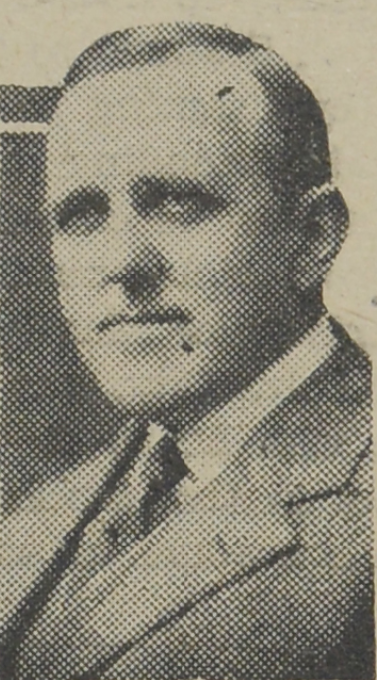
- Guptill, pictured in a 1935 newspaper

Member of the Legislative Assembly of New Brunswick
- In office 1912–1935
- Constituency: Charlotte

Personal details
- Born: May 16, 1889 Grand Manan, New Brunswick
- Died: February 24, 1949 (aged 59)
- Party: Conservative Party of New Brunswick
- Spouse: Gladys Aimee Dalzell
- Occupation: wholesale fish dealer, broker

Scott Darrell Guptill (May 16, 1889 – February 24, 1949) was a Canadian politician. He served in the Legislative Assembly of New Brunswick as member of the Conservative party representing Charlotte County from 1912 to 1935.
