= W. Woodbury Wells =

Canadian politician

William Woodbury Wells (1860 – January 5, 1901) was a teacher, lawyer and political figure in New Brunswick, Canada. He represented Westmorland County in the Legislative Assembly of New Brunswick from 1892 to 1899 as a Liberal member.

He was born in Point de Bute, New Brunswick, the son of Charles C. Wells. Wells married a Miss Turner. He was principal of the Superior School at Port Elgin. Wells was admitted to practice as a barrister in 1893. He died in office in 1901.
