= Fred Magee =

Canadian politician

Fred Magee (May 29, 1875 – May 5, 1952) was an industrialist and political figure in New Brunswick, Canada. He represented Westmorland County in the Legislative Assembly of New Brunswick from 1917 to 1925.

== Career ==
He was born in Baie Verte, New Brunswick, the son of Thomas and Olive (née Oulton) Magee, both of Irish descent. He was educated in Baie Verte, Saint John and Fredericton and went on to study at the University of New Brunswick. Following the family tradition, Fred, at age 22, opened a general store in Port Elgin. He was elected to and served on the Westmorland County council from 1908 to 1910. He was a member of the province's Executive Council, first as minister without portfolio in 1921 and then president. Magee later operated produce and fish processing plants in Port Elgin, selling lobster under the Mephisto label. He died in 1952, shortly before his 77th birthday. He had been married to Myrtle R. McLeod in 1899.

His former home on Main Street in Strait Shores is now an apartment and the neighbouring building, his former offices, used to house the municipal office, fire department and library. Was sold Nov 1 2018 to Kerry Phibbs and Christina Morrison who plan to use part of the building as Port Elgin Community Hall. In his will he left a large endowment to the University of New Brunswick.
