= John A. Humphrey =

Canadian politician

MLA for Westmorland
- In office 1872 to 1878; 1883 to 1890

Personal details
- Born: John Albert Humphrey; December 23, 1823 Southampton, Nova Scotia
- Died: November 3, 1895 (aged 71)
- Party: Liberal-Conservative
- Spouse: Sarah Jane Harris (m. 1855)

John Albert Humphrey (December 23, 1823 – November 3, 1895) was a mill owner and political figure in New Brunswick, Canada. He represented Westmorland County in the Legislative Assembly of New Brunswick from 1872 to 1878 and from 1883 to 1890 as a Liberal-Conservative.

== Early life ==
He was born on December 23, 1823, in Southampton, Nova Scotia. He was a son of William Humphrey and Mary (Trueman) Humphrey. Both of his parents were children of settlers from Yorkshire, England, his father having been born in Nova Scotia and his mother in Sackville, New Brunswick.

He was educated at Amherst, Nova Scotia and Mount Allison Academy.

== Business interests ==
He left school and ran a milling business for his father from 1845 to 1849, at which point he moved to the community then called The Bend (Later Moncton) where he purchased mills there.

Humphrey owned sawmills and woollen mills and was also director for several companies in Moncton.

His business operations were very profitable. By the 1890s, he was one of the richest men in Canada. He was among the largest stockholders in the Moncton Gas and Water Company, the Moncton Sugar Refining Company, and the Moncton Cotton Manufacturing Company, having been a director in all three companies.

== Public service ==
Humphrey sat four terms as a Member of the Legislative Assembly of New Brunswick representing Westmorland County. He was first elected on the free schools issue in 1872 and served until 1878. He was re-elected in 1882 and 1886 before declining nomination in 1890.

During his tenure as MPP, some key events occurred:

- 1871 : The Common Schools Act, establishing free public schooling in New Brunswick, establishing standards for teacher certification and limiting the influence of religion in education
- A partial extension of the voting franchise to widows and unmarried women who owned property
- 1890: The incorporation of Moncton as a city.
- 1892: The abolition of the Legislative Council, New Brunswick's upper house of government.

== Marriage and family ==
Humphrey married Sarah Jane Harris, daughter of John L. Harris who was one of the leading merchants and shipbuilders in the area. They had the following known children:

- Sarah (Humphrey) Lockhart m. L.D. Lockhart
- Jane Humphrey
- Mary Humphrey
- William F. Humphrey

== Illness, death and burial ==
Humphrey was in failing health for a number of years prior to his death. In 1891, he went to England where he consulted a specialist but obtained no relief. He was able to fulfil his business duties until the last few weeks of his life. He died on November 3, 1895, at the age of 72 and was interred at the Elmwood Cemetery.

== Legacy ==
John Humphrey was described as a man of "splendid physique, with a mind of more than ordinary grasp, with an ingrained honesty and a purpose that never varied… a model man in almost every relationship of life."

A small settlement known as Humphreys Mills, now a neighbourhood of Moncton, grew up around his mills on Humphreys Brook, a tributary of the Petitcodiac River.

As of 1996, the John A. Humphrey Residence located on Mill Road is now a historic property.
