= 1903 New Brunswick general election =

Canadian provincial election

The 1903 New Brunswick general election was held on 28 February 1903, to elect 46 members to the 31st New Brunswick Legislative Assembly, the governing house of the province of New Brunswick, Canada. The election was held before the adoption of party labels.

Of forty-six MLAs, thirty-three supported the government, ten formed the opposition, and the other three were neutral. The government of Lemuel John Tweedie was re-elected.

New Brunswick general election, 1903
Party	Leader	Seats
Government (Liberal)	Lemuel John Tweedie	33
Opposition (Conservative)	John Douglas Hazen	10
Neutral		3
