= Henry Absalom Powell =

Canadian politician

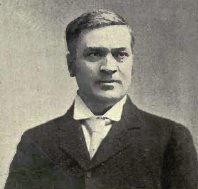

Member of the Canadian Parliament for Westmorland
- In office 1895–1900
- Preceded by: Josiah Wood
- Succeeded by: Henry Emmerson

Personal details
- Born: April 6, 1855 Richibucto, New Brunswick
- Died: April 15, 1930 (aged 75)
- Party: Liberal-Conservative

Henry Absalom Powell (April 6, 1855 – April 15, 1930) was a Canadian lawyer and politician.

Born in Richibucto, New Brunswick, the son of Edmund Powell, Powell was educated at Kent County Grammar School and at Mount Allison University where he graduated in 1875. He was called to the Bar of New Brunswick in 1880 and was appointed Queen's Counsel in 1894. Powell practised law in Sackville and Saint John. He was also professor of law at King's College in Windsor, Nova Scotia.

He was elected to the Legislative Assembly of New Brunswick in the general elections of 1890, but resigned after the election was protested. He was re-elected, and again, in 1891, after being unseated. He was re-elected in 1892 and resigned in August 1895 when he was elected to the House of Commons of Canada for the electoral district of Westmorland. A Liberal-Conservative, he was re-elected in 1896. He was defeated in 1900, 1904, and 1911. He was a member of the Board of Governors of Mount Allison University. He was appointed to the International Joint Commission in 1911 and served until 1928.

In 1878, he married Allie Payson. Powell died in Saint John at the age of 75.

== electoral record ==
By-election on 5 August 1895
Party	Candidate	Votes
Liberal-Conservative	Henry A. Powell	acclaimed

1896 Canadian federal election: Westmoreland
Party	Candidate	Votes	%	±%
Liberal-Conservative	Henry A. Powell	3,442	50.1	-17.1
Liberal	C.N. Robinson	3,427	49.9	+17.1

1900 Canadian federal election: Westmoreland
Party	Candidate	Votes	%	±%
Liberal	Henry Emmerson	4,420	52.9	+3.0
Conservative	Henry A. Powell	3,934	47.1	-3.0
