= Francis J. Sweeney =

Canadian politician

Francis Jeremiah Sweeney (April 21, 1862 – March 2, 1921) was a lawyer and political figure in New Brunswick. He represented Westmorland County in the Legislative Assembly of New Brunswick as a Liberal member from 1903 to 1912 and from 1917 to 1920.

He was born in Melrose, in Westmorland County, New Brunswick, the son of Jeremiah Sweeney and Catherine Sullivan, both natives of County Cork, Ireland. Sweeney was educated at St. Joseph's College in Memramcook. He was a police and stipendiary magistrate for the city of Moncton. Sweeney served on the province's Executive Council as Surveyor-General. He died in Montreal, Quebec in 1921.
