= 1948 New Brunswick general election =

Canadian provincial election

| ← 1944 | June 28, 1948 | 1952 → |

52 seats of the Legislative Assembly of New Brunswick 27 seats needed for a majority
| | First party | Second party |
|---|---|---|
| Leader | John B. McNair | Hugh H. Mackay |
| Party | Liberal | Progressive Conservative |
| Leader since | 1940 | 1939 |
| Leader's seat | York | Kings |
| Last election | 36 | 12 |
| Seats won | 47 | 5 |
| Seat change | ▲11 | ▼7 |
| Percentage | 57.8% | 31.2% |
| Swing | ▲9.5% | ▼8.8% |
Premier before election
John B. McNair
Liberal
Premier after election
John B. McNair
Liberal

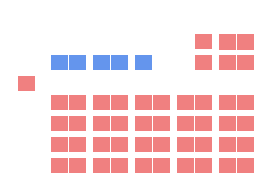
Rendition of party representation in the 41st New Brunswick Legislative Assembly decided by this election. Liberals (47) Conservatives (5)

The 1948 New Brunswick general election was held on June 28, 1948, to elect 52 members to the 41st New Brunswick Legislative Assembly, the governing house of the province of New Brunswick, Canada.

The Liberal government of John B. McNair was re-elected.

The election was held using 17 districts, electing between two and five members each, through Block Voting. Carleton, which elected 2 Progressive-Conservatives and a Liberal, was the only district where mixed representation was produced. The rest each produced one-party sweeps.

New Brunswick general election, 1948
| Party | Leader | Seats | Pop Vote |
|---|---|---|---|
| New Brunswick Liberal Association | John B. McNair | 47 | 57.8% |
| Conservative Party of New Brunswick | Hugh H. Mackay | 5 | 31.2% |
| Co-operative Commonwealth Federation | Joseph C. Arrowsmith | 0 | 6.0% |
| Social Credit Party | | 0 | 3.1% |
| Other / Non-Partisan | | 0 | 1.9% |

Popular vote
| Liberal | 57.80% |
| PC | 31.20% |
| CCF | 6.00% |
| Social Credit | 3.10% |
| Others | 1.90% |

Seats summary
| Liberal | 90.38% |
| PC | 9.62% |
