= Olivier-Maximin Melanson =

Canadian politician

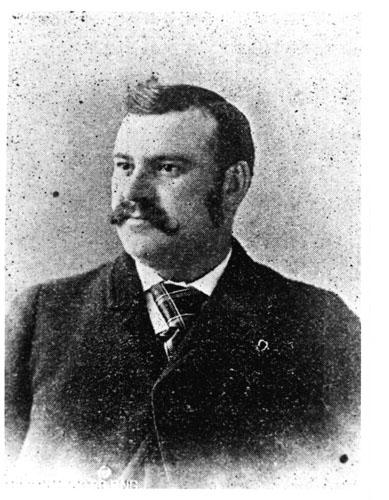
Portrait of Olivier-Maximin Melanson

Olivier-Maximin Melanson (July 2, 1854 – July 7, 1926) was an Acadian businessman and politician in the Province of New Brunswick, Canada. He represented Westmorland County in the Legislative Assembly of New Brunswick from 1890 to 1892, from 1899 to 1903 and from 1912 to 1917.

He was born and was educated in Haute Aboujagane, New Brunswick, the son of Maximin Melanson and Julie Le Blanc. He began work as a clerk in a store owned by an Acadian merchant in Shediac. After partnering with one of his employer's sons in business, Melanson opened his own store in 1874. He also began exporting produce, potatoes and eggs, and lobsters. In 1878, he married Marguerite Boudreau. In 1892, he was elected to the council for Shediac. Melanson was defeated in bids for reelection to the provincial assembly in 1892, 1903 and 1908. He was one of the first Acadians to give speeches in French in the assembly. He went on to serve as speaker for the legislative assembly from 1916 to 1917, when he retired from politics. Melanson died in Moncton at the age of 72 and was buried at Shediac.

Political offices
Preceded by Walter B. Dickson	Speaker of the Legislative Assembly of New Brunswick; 1916–1917	Succeeded by William Currie
