= Albert James Smith =

Canadian politician

The Honourable Sir Albert James Smith PC KCMG QC
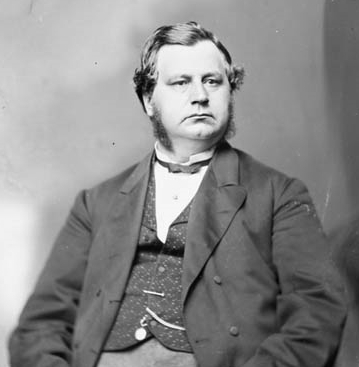
- Hon. Sir Albert James Smith, April 1868

Attorney General of Canada (Acting)
- In office June 1, 1874 – July 7, 1874
- Preceded by: Antoine-Aimé Dorion
- Succeeded by: Télesphore Fournier

Premier of the Colony of New Brunswick
- In office September 21, 1865 – April 14, 1866
- Preceded by: Samuel Leonard Tilley
- Succeeded by: Peter Mitchell

Member of the Canadian Parliament for Westmorland
- In office 1867–1882
- Succeeded by: Josiah Wood

Personal details
- Born: March 12, 1822 Shediac, New Brunswick
- Died: June 30, 1883 (aged 61) Dorchester, New Brunswick
- Resting place: Dorchester Rural Cemetery
- Party: Liberal
- Spouse: Sarah Marie Young (m. 1868)
- Children: one son (d. 30 June 1883)

Sir Albert James Smith PC KCMG QC (March 12, 1822 – June 30, 1883) was a New Brunswick politician and opponent of Canadian Confederation. Smith's grandfather was a United Empire Loyalist who left Massachusetts to settle in New Brunswick after the American Revolution.

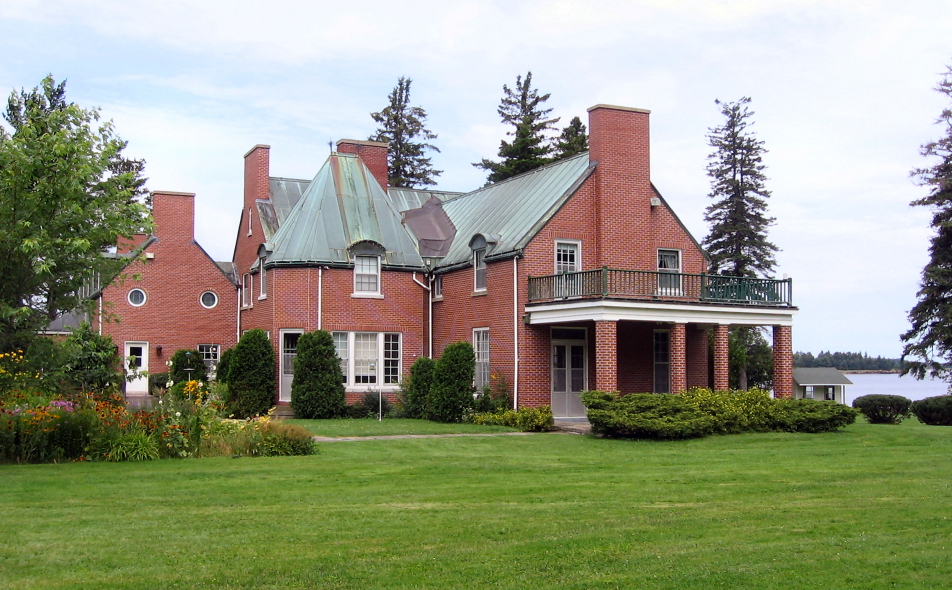
A. J. Smith's legacy paid for this house, the residence of his grandson J. W. Y. Smith, called Younglands, on Shediac Bay, New Brunswick. Built in 1927, it is now owned by a Catholic order.

Smith entered politics in 1852 entering the House of Assembly as an opponent of the Tory compact that ran the colony and became a leading reform and advocate of responsible government which was granted to the colony in 1854. Smith became a member of the reform government that took power that year and went on to become Attorney-General in 1861 under Premier Samuel Leonard Tilley. Smith split with Tilley over railway policy and Canadian Confederation with Smith becoming leader of the Anti-Confederates winning the 1865 election but was forced from office the next year by the lieutenant-governor.

He was created a Queen's Counsel in 1862.

Smith reconciled with Confederation after it became a fact and became minister of fisheries in the Liberal government of Alexander Mackenzie in 1873. He died in 1883, and was interred in Dorchester Rural Cemetery.

== Electoral record ==
1867 Canadian federal election: Westmoreland
Party	Candidate	Votes	%
Liberal	Albert James Smith	2,207	82.9
Conservative	Israël Landry	454	17.1

1872 Canadian federal election: Westmoreland
Party	Candidate	Votes	%	±%
Liberal	Albert Smith	acclaimed		
Source: Canadian Elections Database

By-election: on Mr. Smith being appointed Minister of Marine and Fisheries:

By-election on 7 November 1873
Party	Candidate	Votes
Liberal	Albert James Smith	acclaimed

1874 Canadian federal election: Westmoreland
Party	Candidate	Votes	%	±%
Liberal	Albert James Smith	acclaimed		
Source: lop.parl.ca

1878 Canadian federal election: Westmoreland
Party	Candidate	Votes	%	±%
Liberal	Albert James Smith	2,572	57.2	
Unknown	R.A. Chapman	1,928	42.8	

1882 Canadian federal election: Westmoreland
Party	Candidate	Votes	%	±%
Conservative	Josiah Wood	2,620	54.5	+11.7
Liberal	Albert James Smith	2,188	45.5	-11.7

Political offices
Preceded by Peter Mitchell (politician)	Minister of Marine and Fisheries; 1873–1878	Succeeded by James Colledge Pope
Preceded by Antoine-Aimé Dorion	Minister of Justice; 1874	Succeeded by Télesphore Fournier
