= 29th New Brunswick Legislature =

The 29th New Brunswick Legislative Assembly represented New Brunswick between February 13, 1896, and January 26, 1899.

John James Fraser served as Lieutenant-Governor of New Brunswick until November 1896 when he was succeeded by Abner Reid McClelan.

J.P. Burchill was chosen as speaker.

The Liberal Party led by Andrew G. Blair formed the government. James Mitchell became party leader in 1896 when Blair left provincial politics. Mitchell retired due to poor health in 1897 and was replaced by Henry Emmerson.

== Members ==
Electoral District	Name	Party	First elected / previously elected
Albert	W.J. Lewis (Note: elected to federal seat)	Independent	1878, 1890
Albert	H.R. Emerson	Liberal	1888, 1892
Albert	Charles J. Osman (1897)	Liberal	1897
Carleton	J.T. Allan Dibblee	Conservative	1892
Carleton	Hugh H. McCain	Liberal	1895
Carleton	Charles L. Smith	Liberal	1895
Charlotte	James Mitchell	Liberal	1882
Charlotte	James Russell	Liberal	1886
Charlotte	George F. Hill	Liberal	1878, 1892
Charlotte	James O'Brien	Liberal	1892
Charlotte	John Dewolfe Chipman (1898)	Conservative	1898
Gloucester	Peter J. Veniot	Liberal	1894
Gloucester	John Sievewright	Independent	1892
Gloucester	Prosper E. Paulin	Conservative	1895
Gloucester	Joseph Poirier (1898)	Conservative	1890, 1898
Kent	Urbain Johnson	Liberal	1869, 1874, 1895
Kent	James Barnes	Liberal	1895
Kent	Pierre H. Léger	Conservative	1895
Kings	George G. Scovil	Liberal	1892
Kings	Albert S. White	Liberal	1886
Kings	George W. Fowler	Conservative	1895
Madawaska	Alphonse Bertrand	Conservative	1895
Madawaska	Cyprien Martin	Liberal	1895
Northumberland	James Robinson	Conservative	1890
Northumberland	Lemuel J. Tweedie	Liberal	1874, 1886
Northumberland	John P. Burchill	Liberal	1882, 1887
Northumberland	John O'Brien	Conservative	1890
Northumberland	Allan A. Davidson (1896)	Conservative	1896
Queens	A.G. Blair	Liberal	1878, (Note: York) 1892
Queens	Laughlin P. Farris	Liberal	1892
Queens	Isaac W. Carpenter (1896)	Independent	1896
Restigouche	Charles H. LaBillois	Conservative	1882
Restigouche	William A. Mott	Conservative	1892
Saint John City	William Shaw	Conservative	1890
Saint John City	A.A. Stockton	Conservative	1883
Saint John City	Silas Alward	Liberal	1868, (Note: Victoria) 1886
Saint John City	Charles B. Lockhart	Conservative	1895
Saint John County	Albert T. Dunn	Liberal	1892
Saint John County	John McLeod	Liberal	1892
Sunbury	Charles B. Harrison	Liberal	1886
Sunbury	David Morrow	Independent	1895
Victoria	James E. Porter	Liberal	1890, 1895
Victoria	Adam J. Beveridge	Liberal	1895
Westmorland	A.E. Killam	Conservative	1878, 1883, 1892
Westmorland	Ambrose D. Richard	Conservative	1895
Westmorland	Frederick W. Sumner	Conservative	1895
Westmorland	W. Woodbury Wells	Liberal	1892
Westmorland	Clifford William Robinson (1897)	Liberal	1897
York	John Black	Liberal	1895
York	William T. Howe	Conservative	1892
York	Herman H. Pitts	Conservative	1892
York	James K. Pinder	Conservative	1892

== Notes ==
Preceded by 28th New Brunswick Legislature	Legislative Assemblies of New Brunswick; 1896–1899	Succeeded by 30th New Brunswick Legislature
