= 27th New Brunswick Legislature =

The 27th New Brunswick Legislative Assembly represented New Brunswick between March 13, 1890, and September 28, 1892.

Samuel Leonard Tilley served as Lieutenant-Governor of New Brunswick.

Albert S. White was chosen as speaker.

The Liberal Party led by Andrew G. Blair was able to form a government with the support of independent members.

The 27th New Brunswick Legislature abolished the upper house, the Legislative Council, on April 16, 1891. Donald Desserud and Stewart Hyson argued that "the impetus to rid the province of its upper assembly seems to have been less a concern over the council’s elite status, and more because it cost money to operate. Nevertheless, the time it took to abolish the upper chamber tested the patience of New Brunswick’s premier, Andrew Blair (1883-1896), who complained that his appointees to the upper chamber -- chosen for their supposed willingness to support his reform agenda -- developed an alarming independence once they took their seats. Blair eventually got the vote he wanted; however, the council imposed a condition: the council would continue until the next election. So Blair requested and was granted a dissolution two years early, and 'An Act Relating to the Legislative Council' formally abolished the chamber on 16 April 1891."

== Members ==
Electoral District	Name	Party	First elected / previously elected
Albert	W.J. Lewis	Independent	1878, 1890
Albert	Gains S. Turner	Conservative	1878
Carleton	Marcus C. Atkinson	Conservative	1886
Carleton	George R. Ketchum	Conservative	1886
Charlotte	James Mitchell	Liberal	1882
Charlotte	William Douglas	Conservative	1886
Charlotte	George F. Hibbard	Independent	1882
Charlotte	James Russell	Independent	1886
Gloucester	Patrick G. Ryan	Liberal	1876
Gloucester	Joseph Poirier	Conservative	1890
Kent	James D. Phinney	Conservative	1887
Kent	Olivier J. Leblanc (Note: ran for federal seat)	Liberal	1882
Kent	Auguste Théophile Léger (1891)	Liberal	1891
Kings	William Pugsley	Liberal	1885
Kings	Albert S. White	Liberal	1886
Kings	George L. Taylor	Conservative	1886
Madawaska	Lévite Thériault	Liberal	1868, (Note: Victoria) 1886
Northumberland	James Robinson	Conservative	1890
Northumberland	L.J. Tweedie	Liberal	1874, 1886
Northumberland	John P. Burchill	Liberal	1882, 1887
Northumberland	John O'Brien	Conservative	1890
Queens	Thomas Hetherington	Liberal	1882
Queens	Albert Palmer	Liberal	1882
Restigouche	William Murray	Conservative	1885
Restigouche	Charles H. LaBillois	Conservative	1882
Saint John City	Silas Alward	Liberal	1868, 1886
Saint John City	A.C. Smith	Conservative	1890
Saint John County	Harrison A. McKeown	Conservative	1890
Saint John County	Alfred Augustus Stockton	Conservative	1883
Saint John County	James Rourke	Conservative	1890
Saint John County	William Shaw	Conservative	1890
Sunbury	William E. Perley	Conservative	1856, 1874, 1890
Sunbury	Charles B. Harrison	Liberal	1886
Victoria	George Thomas Baird	Conservative	1884
Victoria	James E. Porter (1890)	Liberal	1890
Westmorland	O.M. Melanson	Conservative	1890
Westmorland	Henry A. Powell (Note: election appealed)	Conservative	1890
Westmorland	H.T. Stevens; Henry A. Powell (1891)	Independent	1890
Westmorland	D.L. Hanington	Conservative	1870, 1878
Westmorland	Joseph A. McQueen (1891)	Liberal	1891
York (Note: election protested and second election held in October 1890)	A.G. Blair (Note: re-elected)	Liberal	1878
York	William Wilson	Liberal	1885
York	Richard Bellamy (Note: lost second election); John Anderson (1890)	Liberal	1886
York	John Anderson	Independent	1890
York	Thomas Colter (1890)	Conservative	1890

== Notes ==
Preceded by 26th New Brunswick Legislature	Legislative Assemblies of New Brunswick; 1890–1892	Succeeded by 28th New Brunswick Legislature
