= 26th New Brunswick Legislature =

The 26th New Brunswick Legislative Assembly represented New Brunswick between March 3, 1887, and December 30, 1889.

== Government ==
Position	Name
Lieutenant-Governor of New Brunswick.	Samuel Leonard Tilley
Speaker	William Pugsley
Government formed by	Liberal Party led by Andrew G. Blair

== Members ==
Electoral District	Name	Party	First elected / previously elected
Albert	William James Lewis (Note: resigned)	Independent	1878
Albert	Gains S. Turner	Conservative	1878
Albert	H.R. Emmerson (1888)	Liberal	1888
Carleton	George R. Ketchum	Liberal	1886
Carleton	Marcus C. Atkinson	Conservative	1886
Charlotte	William Douglas	Conservative	1886
Charlotte	James Mitchell	Liberal	1882
Charlotte	James Russell	Independent	1886
Charlotte	George F. Hibbard	Independent	1882
Gloucester	James Young	Conservative	1886
Gloucester	Patrick G. Ryan	Liberal	1876
Kent	Olivier J. Leblanc	Liberal	1882
Kent	William Wheton	Independent	1882
Kent	James D. Phinney (1887)	Conservative	1887
Kings	William Pugsley	Liberal	1885
Kings	Albert S. White	Liberal	1886
Kings	George L. Taylor	Conservative	1886
Madawaska	Lévite Thériault	Liberal	1868, (Note: Victoria) 1886
Northumberland	Michael Adams (Note: ran for federal seat)	Conservative	1870, 1878
Northumberland	William A. Park	Conservative	1882
Northumberland	L.J. Tweedie	Liberal	1874, 1886
Northumberland	Ernest Hutchinson	Independent	1878, 1886
Northumberland	John P. Burchill (1887)	Liberal	1882, 1887
Northumberland	John Morrissy (1888)	Independent	1888
Queens	Albert Palmer	Liberal	1882
Queens	Thomas Hetherington	Liberal	1882
Restigouche	William Murray	Conservative	1885
Restigouche	Charles H. LaBillois	Conservative	1882
Saint John City	John V. Ellis (Note: elected to federal seat)	Liberal	1882
Saint John City	John Berryman	Liberal	1886
Saint John City	Silas Alward (1887)	Liberal	1887
Saint John County	David McLellan	Liberal	1878
Saint John County	Robert J. Ritchie	Liberal	1878
Saint John County	William A. Quinton	Liberal	1882
Saint John County	Alfred Augustus Stockton	Conservative	1883
Sunbury	Arthur Glasier	Liberal	1883
Sunbury	Charles B. Harrison	Liberal	1886
Victoria	George Thomas Baird	Conservative	1884
Westmorland	D.L. Hanington	Conservative	1870, 1878
Westmorland	Joseph L. Black	Independent	1878, 1886
Westmorland	John A. Humphrey	Conservative	1872, 1882
Westmorland	A.E. Killam	Conservative	1878, 1882
York	A.G. Blair	Liberal	1878
York	William Wilson	Liberal	1885
York	Richard Bellamy	Liberal	1886
York	David R. Moore	Liberal	1886

== Notes ==
Preceded by 25th New Brunswick Legislature	Legislative Assemblies of New Brunswick; 1886–1890	Succeeded by 27th New Brunswick Legislature
