= 28th New Brunswick Legislature =

The 28th New Brunswick Legislative Assembly represented New Brunswick between March 9, 1893, and September 1895.

Samuel Leonard Tilley served as Lieutenant-Governor of New Brunswick until September 1893, when he was replaced by John Boyd. John James Fraser became lieutenant-governor after Boyd's death in December of that year.

John Percival Burchill was chosen as speaker.

The Liberal Party led by Andrew G. Blair formed the government. However, Blair was defeated in his own riding and was forced to run in a by-election in Queen's.

The province's Legislative Council was abolished in 1892.

== Members ==
Electoral District	Name	Party	First elected / previously elected
Albert	H.R. Emmerson	Liberal	1888, 1892
Albert	W.J. Lewis	Independent	1878, 1890
Carleton	Henry A. Connell	Independent	1892
Carleton	J.T. Allan Dibblee	Conservative	1892
Carleton	Marcus C. Atkinson (1895)	Conservative	1895
Charlotte	James Mitchell	Liberal	1882
Charlotte	George F. Hill	Liberal	1878, 1892
Charlotte	James O'Brien	Liberal	1892
Charlotte	James Russell	Liberal	1886
Gloucester	Théotime Blanchard	Conservative	1870, 1892
Gloucester	John Sievewright	Independent	1892
Gloucester	Peter Veniot (1894)	Liberal	1894
Kent	James D. Phinney	Conservative	1887
Kent	Jean-Baptiste Goguen	Conservative	1892
Kings	Albert S. White	Liberal	1886
Kings	George G. Scovil	Liberal	1892
Kings	Gabriel Flewelling	Conservative	1882, 1892
Madawaska	Lévite Thériault	Liberal	1868, (Note: Victoria) 1886
Madawaska	Cyprien Martin (1895)	Liberal	1895
Northumberland	L.J. Tweedie	Liberal	1874, 1886
Northumberland	John O'Brien	Conservative	1890
Northumberland	John P. Burchill	Liberal	1882, 1887
Northumberland	James Robinson	Conservative	1890
Queens	Thomas Hetherington (Note: resigned)	Liberal	1882
Queens	Laughlin P. Farris	Liberal	1892
Queens	Andrew G. Blair (1892)	Liberal	1878, (Note: York) 1892
Restigouche	William A. Mott	Conservative	1892
Restigouche	Charles H. LaBillois	Conservative	1882
Saint John City	Alfred Augustus Stockton	Conservative	1883
Saint John City	Silas Alward	Liberal	1868, 1886
Saint John City	A.C. Smith	Conservative	1890
Saint John City	William Shaw	Conservative	1890
Saint John County	Albert T. Dunn	Liberal	1892
Saint John County	John McLeod	Liberal	1892
Sunbury	William E. Perley	Conservative	1856, 1874, 1890
Sunbury	Charles B. Harrison	Liberal	1886
Victoria	George Thomas Baird	Conservative	1884, 1892
Westmorland	John W. Y. Smith	Independent	1892
Westmorland	W. Woodbury Wells	Liberal	1892
Westmorland	Henry A. Powell	Conservative	1890
Westmorland	Amasa E. Killam	Conservative	1878, 1883, 1892
York	William K. Allen	Independent	1892
York	William T. Howe	Conservative	1892
York	James K. Pinder	Conservative	1892
York	Herman H. Pitts	Conservative	1892

== Notes ==
Preceded by 27th New Brunswick Legislature	Legislative Assemblies of New Brunswick; 1892–1895	Succeeded by 29th New Brunswick Legislature
