= Victoria (New Brunswick provincial electoral district) =

Defunct provincial electoral district in New Brunswick, Canada

New Brunswick electoral district

Defunct provincial electoral district
- Legislature: Legislative Assembly of New Brunswick
- District created: 1846
- District abolished: 1973
- First contested: 1846
- Last contested: 1970

Victoria was a provincial electoral district for the Legislative Assembly of New Brunswick, Canada. It used a bloc voting system to elect members, and was created from Carleton in 1846. It was abolished with the 1973 electoral redistribution, when the province moved to single-member ridings.

== Members of the Legislative Assembly ==
Legislature	Years	Member	Party	Member	Party
Riding created from Carleton
15th	1851 – 1854	John Richard Partelow	Independent	Francis Rice	Independent
16th	1854 – 1856	James Tibbits	Independent	Francis Rice	Independent
17th	1856 – 1857	James Tibbits	Independent	Charles Watters	Independent
18th	1857 – 1861	James Tibbits	Independent	Charles Watters	Independent
19th	1862 – 1865	David B. Raymond	Independent	John Costigan	Conservative
20th	1865 – 1866	Benjamin Beveridge	Independent	John Costigan	Conservative
21st	1866 – 1867	Benjamin Beveridge	Independent	Vital Hébert	Independent
21st	1868 – 1870	Benjamin Beveridge	Independent	Lévite Thériault	Independent
22nd	1870 – 1874	James Tibbits	Independent	Lévite Thériault	Independent
23rd	1875 – 1878	William Blackwood Beveridge	Liberal-Conservative		
24th	1879 – 1882	William Blackwood Beveridge	Liberal-Conservative		
25th	1883 – 1884	Richard Tibbits	Conservative		
25th	1884 – 1886	George Thomas Baird	Conservative		
26th	1886 – 1890	George Thomas Baird	Conservative		
27th	1890 – 1892	James Porter	Liberal		
28th	1892 – 1895	George Thomas Baird	Conservative		
29th	1896 – 1899	James Porter	Liberal	Adam Beveridge	Liberal
30th	1899 – 1903	James Porter	Liberal	Thomas Lawson	Independent
31st	1903 – 1908	John F. Tweeddale	Liberal	James Burgress Jr.	Independent
32nd	1908 – 1912	John F. Tweeddale	Liberal	James Burgress Jr.	Independent
33rd	1912 – 1917	J. Leigh White	Independent	Thomas J. Carter	Independent
34th	1917	John F. Tweeddale	Liberal	James Burgess	Liberal
34th	1917 – 1920	John F. Tweeddale	Liberal	Walter Edward Foster	Liberal
35th	1921 – 1925	D. Wetmore Pickett	United Farmers	George W. Warnock	United Farmers
36th	1925 – 1930	Oran B. Davis	Liberal	John W. Niles	Liberal
37th	1931 – 1935	Frederick William Pirie	Liberal	John W. Niles	Liberal
38th	1935 – 1939	Frederick William Pirie	Liberal	John W. Niles	Liberal
39th	1939 – 1940	Frederick William Pirie	Liberal	John W. Niles	Liberal
39th	1940 – 1944	Frederick William Pirie	Liberal	John B. McNair	Liberal
40th	1944 – 1945	Frederick William Pirie	Liberal	Michael F. McCloskey	Liberal
40th	1945 – 1948	Vernon R. Briggs	Liberal	Michael F. McCloskey	Liberal
41st	1948 – 1952	Vernon R. Briggs	Liberal	Michael F. McCloskey	Liberal
42nd	1952 – 1956	J. Stewart Brooks	Progressive Conservative	Walter Powers	Progressive Conservative
43rd	1957 – 1960	J. Stewart Brooks	Progressive Conservative	L.B. Rideout	Progressive Conservative
44th	1960 – 1963	J. Stewart Brooks	Progressive Conservative	T.E. Duffie	Liberal
45th	1963 – 1967	J. Stewart Brooks	Progressive Conservative	Leon B. Rideout	Progressive Conservative
46th	1967 – 1970	J. Stewart Brooks	Progressive Conservative	Leon B. Rideout	Progressive Conservative
47th	1970 – 1974	J. Stewart Brooks	Progressive Conservative	Joseph E. M. Ouellette	Progressive Conservative
Riding dissolved into Grand Falls and Victoria-Tobique

== Election results ==
1970 New Brunswick general election
Party	Candidate	Votes	Elected
Progressive Conservative	J. Stewart Brooks	3,834	✓
Progressive Conservative	Joseph Ouellette	3,307	✓
Liberal	Everard Daigle	3,273	
Liberal	Winfred V. Baker	3,226	

1967 New Brunswick general election
Party	Candidate	Votes	Elected
Progressive Conservative	J. Stewart Brooks	3,913	✓
Progressive Conservative	Leon B. Rideout	3,703	✓
Liberal	Everard Daigle	3,366	
Liberal	Gordon Matheson	3,193	

== See also ==
- List of New Brunswick provincial electoral districts
- Canadian provincial electoral districts
