= Saint John County (provincial electoral district) =

Defunct provincial electoral district in New Brunswick, Canada

New Brunswick electoral district

Defunct provincial electoral district
- Legislature: Legislative Assembly of New Brunswick
- District created: 1795
- District abolished: 1973
- First contested: 1795
- Last contested: 1970

Saint John County was a provincial electoral district for the Legislative Assembly of New Brunswick, Canada. It used a bloc voting system to elect candidates, and was created from Saint John in 1795 as Saint John City and County. It lost territory (and two members) to the riding of Saint John City in 1891 and was renamed Saint John County. It was abolished with the 1973 electoral redistribution, when the province moved to single-member ridings.

== Members of the Legislative Assembly ==
Legislature	Years	Member	Party	Member	Party	Member	Party	Member	Party
Saint John City and County; Riding created from Saint John
3rd	1795 – 1802	William Pagan	Ind.	Jonathan Bliss	Ind.	James Simonds	Ind.	Bradford Gilbert	Ind.
4th	1802 – 1804	William Pagan	Ind.	Hugh Johnston	Ind.	Edward Sands	Ind.	Bradford Gilbert	Ind.
4th	1804 – 1809	William Pagan	Ind.	Hugh Johnston	Ind.	Munson Jarvis	Ind.	Bradford Gilbert	Ind.
5th	1809 – 1816	William Pagan	Ind.	Hugh Johnston	Ind.	John Ward	Ind.	Thomas Wetmore	Ind.
6th	1817 – 1819	Thomas Millidge Jr.	Ind.	Hugh Johnston	Ind.	John Ward	Ind.	Craven Calverly	Ind.
7th	1820	Thomas Millidge Jr.	Ind.	Hugh Johnston	Ind.	John Ward	Ind.	Zalmon Wheeler	Ind.
8th	1821 – 1826	Ward Chipman Jr.	Ind.	Andrew S. Ritchie	Ind.	John McNeil Wilmot	Ind.	Charles Simonds	Ind.
8th	1826 – 1827	Robert Parker	Ind.	Andrew S. Ritchie	Ind.	John McNeil Wilmot	Ind.	Charles Simonds	Ind.
9th	1827 – 1830	Robert Parker	Ind.	John Richard Partelow	Ind.	John Ward Jr.	Ind.	Charles Simonds	Ind.
10th	1831 – 1834	Stephen Humbert	Ind.	John Richard Partelow	Ind.	John Ward Jr.	Ind.	Charles Simonds	Ind.
11th	1835 – 1837	George D. Robinson	Ind.	John Richard Partelow	Ind.	John McNeil Wilmot	Ind.	Charles Simonds	Ind.
12th	1837 – 1842	John Jordan	Ind.	John Richard Partelow	Ind.	John McNeil Wilmot	Ind.	Charles Simonds	Ind.
13th	1843 – 1846	John Jordan	Ind.	John Richard Partelow	Ind.	Robert Payne	Ind.	Charles Simonds	Ind.
14th	1847 – 1850	John Jordan	Ind.	John Richard Partelow	Ind.	William Johnstone Ritchie	Lib.	Robert Duncan Wilmot	Cons.
15th	1851	John Hamilton Gray	Cons.	Charles Simonds	Ind.	William Johnstone Ritchie	Lib.	Robert Duncan Wilmot	Cons.
15th	1851 – 1854	John Hamilton Gray	Cons.	John F. Godard	Ind.	John Johnson	Ind.	Robert Duncan Wilmot	Cons.
16th	1854 – 1856	John Hamilton Gray	Cons.	John Richard Partelow	Ind.	William Johnstone Ritchie	Lib.	Robert Duncan Wilmot	Cons.
17th	1856 – 1857	John Hamilton Gray	Cons.	John F. Godard	Ind.	Charles Simonds	Ind.	Robert Duncan Wilmot	Cons.
18th	1857 – 1861	John Hamilton Gray	Cons.	Richard Wright	Ind.	John W. Cudlip	Ind.	Robert Duncan Wilmot	Cons.
19th	1862 – 1865	Timothy Anglin	Lib.	John Jordan	Ind.	John W. Cudlip	Ind.	Charles Nelson Skinner	Lib.
20th	1865 – 1866	Timothy Anglin	Lib.	Robert Duncan Wilmot	Cons.	John W. Cudlip	Ind.	Joseph Coram	Ind.
21st	1866 – 1867	Charles Nelson Skinner	Lib.	Robert Duncan Wilmot	Cons.	John Hamilton Gray	Cons.	James Quinton	Ind.
21st	1867 – 1868	Charles Nelson Skinner	Lib.	George Edwin King	Cons.	Joseph Coram	Ind.	James Quinton	Ind.
21st	1868 – 1870	John W. Cudlip	Ind.	George Edwin King	Cons.	Joseph Coram	Ind.	James Quinton	Ind.
22nd	1870 – 1874	Edward Willis	Ind.	George Edwin King	Cons.	Joseph Coram	Ind.	Michael Whalen Maher	Ind.
23rd	1875	Edward Willis	Ind.	George Edwin King	Cons.	Joseph Coram	Ind.	Henry A. Austin	Ind.
23rd	1875 – 1878	Edward Willis	Ind.	George Edwin King	Cons.	William Elder	Ind.	Henry A. Austin	Ind.
24th	1879 – 1882	Edward Willis	Ind.	David McLellan	Lib.	William Elder	Ind.	Robert J. Ritchie	Ind.
25th	1883	William A. Quinton	Lib.	David McLellan	Lib.	William Elder	Ind.	Robert J. Ritchie	Ind.
25th	1883 – 1886	William A. Quinton	Lib.	David McLellan	Lib.	Alfred Augustus Stockton	Cons.	Robert J. Ritchie	Ind.
26th	1886 – 1890	William A. Quinton	Lib.	David McLellan	Lib.	Alfred Augustus Stockton	Cons.	Robert J. Ritchie	Ind.
27th	1890 – 1892	Harrison A. McKeown	Lib.-Con.	James Rourke	Lib.-Con.	Alfred Augustus Stockton	Cons.	William Shaw	Lib.-Con.
Saint John County
28th	1892 – 1895	John McLeod	Lib.	Albert T. Dunn	Lib.				
29th	1896 – 1899	John McLeod	Lib.	Albert T. Dunn	Lib.				
30th	1899 – 1901	John McLeod	Lib.	Albert T. Dunn	Lib.				
30th	1902 – 1903	Robert C. Ruddick	Ind.	Albert T. Dunn	Lib.				
31st	1903 – 1904	Robert C. Ruddick	Ind.	Albert T. Dunn	Lib.				
31st	1905 – 1907	Robert C. Ruddick	Ind.	James Lowell	Ind.				
31st	1907 – 1908	Harrison A. McKeown	Lib.-Con.	James Lowell	Ind.				
32nd	1908 – 1909	Harrison A. McKeown	Lib.-Con.	James Lowell	Ind.				
32nd	1909 – 1911	Allister F. Bentley	Lib.	James Lowell	Ind.				
32nd	1911 – 1912	Allister F. Bentley	Lib.	John Babington Macaulay Baxter	Cons.				
33rd	1912 – 1917	Thomas B. Carson	Cons.	John Babington Macaulay Baxter	Cons.				
34th	1917 – 1920	Thomas B. Carson	Cons.	John Babington Macaulay Baxter	Cons.				
35th	1921 – 1922	L. Murray Curran	Lib.	John Babington Macaulay Baxter	Cons.				
35th	1922 – 1925	L. Murray Curran	Lib.	Allister F. Bentley	Lib.				
36th	1925– 1926	John Babington Macaulay Baxter	Cons.	Frank L. Potts	Cons.				
36th	1926 – 1930	John Babington Macaulay Baxter	Cons.	H. Colby Smith	Cons.				
37th	1931	John Babington Macaulay Baxter	Cons.	H. Colby Smith	Cons.				
37th	1931 – 1935	Robert McAllister	Cons.	H. Colby Smith	Cons.				
38th	1935 – 1939	Robert McAllister	Cons.	Alphonso C. Smith	Cons.				
39th	1939 – 1944	Robert McAllister	Cons.	Alphonso C. Smith	Cons.				
40th	1944 – 1948	Robert McAllister	PC	Alphonso C. Smith	PC				
40th	1944 – 1948	Robert McAllister	PC	Edward C. Seeley	PC				
41st	1948 – 1952	Stephen D. Clark	Lib.	Harold C. Atkinson	Lib.				
42nd	1952 – 1956	Arthur W. Carton	PC	Robert McAllister	PC				
43rd	1957 – 1960	Arthur W. Carton	PC	Robert McAllister	PC				
44th	1960 – 1963	C. A. McIlveen	PC	Parker D. Mitchell	PC				
45th	1963 – 1967	C. A. McIlveen	PC	Rodman Logan	PC				
Riding dissolved into Saint John East and Saint John West

== See also ==
- List of New Brunswick provincial electoral districts
- Canadian provincial electoral districts
