= John Babington Macaulay Baxter =

Canadian politician (1868–1946)

The Honourable John Babington Macaulay Baxter PC KC DCL
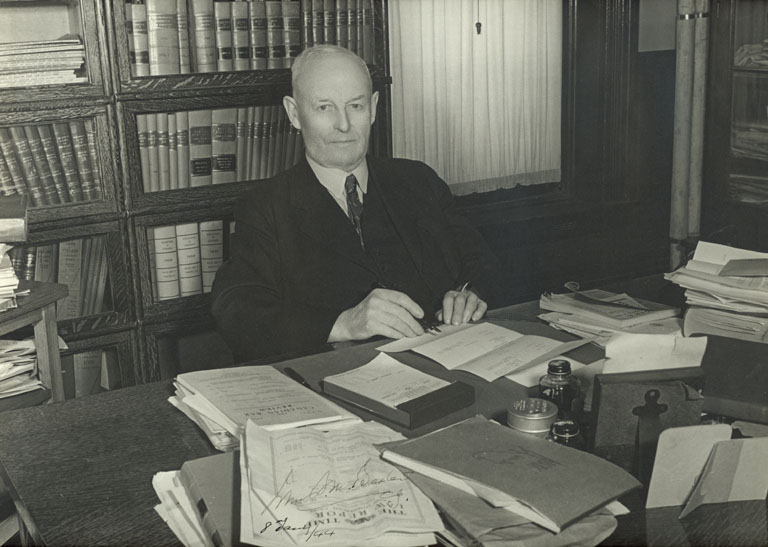
- Baxter in 1944

19th Premier of New Brunswick
- In office 14 September 1925 – 19 May 1931
- Monarch: George V
- Lieutenant Governor: William Frederick Todd; Hugh Havelock McLean
- Preceded by: Peter J. Veniot
- Succeeded by: Charles D. Richards

Member of the Canadian Parliament for St. John—Albert
- In office 6 December 1921 – 23 July 1925 Serving with Murray MacLaren
- Preceded by: Rupert Wilson Wigmore
- Succeeded by: Thomas Bell

Minister of Customs and Excise
- In office 21 September 1921 – 29 December 1921
- Prime Minister: Arthur Meighen
- Preceded by: Rupert Wilson Wigmore
- Succeeded by: Jacques Bureau

Member of the Legislative Assembly of New Brunswick for Saint John County
- In office 7 December 1911 – 6 December 1921 Serving with Allister F. Bentley, Thomas B. Carson, and L. Murray Curran
- Preceded by: James Lowell
- Succeeded by: Allister F. Bentley
- In office 10 August 1925 – 19 May 1931 Serving with Frank L. Potts and H. Colby Smith
- Preceded by: Allister F. Bentley
- Succeeded by: Robert McAllister

Personal details
- Born: 16 February 1868 Saint John, New Brunswick, Canada
- Died: 27 December 1946 (aged 78) Saint John, New Brunswick, Canada
- Party: Conservative
- Spouse: Grace W. Coster (m. 1924)
- Children: John B. M. Jr.; Frederick Coster Noel; Eleanor Crowden; and Mary Faith
- Education: King's College
- Occupation: Author; military officer; jurist; politician; warden

Military service
- Branch/service: Canadian Militia; Canadian Army
- Years of service: 1888–1912
- Rank: Lieutenant colonel
- Commands: 3rd Field Artillery Regiment

John Babington Macaulay Baxter PC KC DCL (16 February 1868 – 27 December 1946) was a Canadian barrister and jurist who was the 19th premier of New Brunswick.

Baxter rose to the rank of lieutenant colonel in the Canadian Army and was the author of Historical Records of the New Brunswick Regiment, Royal Artillery, published in 1896, about the 3rd Field Artillery Regiment which he would later command from 1907 to 1912. He also had a keen interest in genealogy and in 1943 the New Brunswick Museum published his book titled Simon Baxter - The first United Empire Loyalist to settle in New Brunswick, (Canada).

Born in Saint John, New Brunswick, John Baxter served on the municipal council for eighteen years from 1892 to 1910. A Conservative Party member, he was elected to the 32nd New Brunswick Legislative Assembly in 1911. He was appointed Attorney-General of the province, holding that office from 1915 to 1917. He entered federal politics and was Minister of Customs and Excise under Arthur Meighen, the 9th Prime Minister of Canada, in 1921 before taking over the leadership of the provincial Conservative party and leading it to victory in 1925.

Baxter was a leader of the Maritime Rights Movement which expressed the discontent felt by the maritime provinces concerning their loss of influence in the Canadian Confederation dominated by the provinces of Quebec and Ontario.

He left politics in 1931 and was appointed Chief Justice of the New Brunswick Supreme Court in 1935, which he would serve for the remainder of his life. Additionally, Baxter was a Freemason and served as the Grand Master for the Grand Lodge of New Brunswick, holding meetings at the Saint John Masonic Temple.

His son, John B. M. Baxter Jr., later served in the cabinet of Richard Hatfield.

He died in West Saint John in 1946 at 78.

Legal offices
Preceded by J. Douglas Hazen	Chief Justice of New Brunswick; 1935–1946	Succeeded by Charles D. Richards
