= 28th New Brunswick general election =

The 28th New Brunswick general election may refer to

- the 1892 New Brunswick general election, the 28th overall general election for New Brunswick, for the 28th New Brunswick Legislative Assembly, but considered the 8th general election for the Canadian province of New Brunswick, or
- the 1974 New Brunswick general election, the 48th overall general election for New Brunswick, for the 48th New Brunswick Legislative Assembly, but considered the 28th general election for the Canadian province of New Brunswick.
