= 29th New Brunswick general election =

The 29th New Brunswick general election may refer to

- the 1895 New Brunswick general election, the 29th overall general election for New Brunswick, for the 29th New Brunswick Legislative Assembly, but considered the 9th general election for the Canadian province of New Brunswick, or
- the 1978 New Brunswick general election, the 49th overall general election for New Brunswick, for the 49th New Brunswick Legislative Assembly, but considered the 29th general election for the Canadian province of New Brunswick.
