= 7th New Brunswick general election =

7th New Brunswick general election may refer to:

- 1819 New Brunswick general election, the 7th general election to take place in the Colony of New Brunswick, for the 7th New Brunswick Legislative Assembly
- 1890 New Brunswick general election, the 27th overall general election for New Brunswick, for the 27th New Brunswick Legislative Assembly, but considered the 7th general election for the Canadian province of New Brunswick
