= Archibald Harrison =

Canadian politician

MLA for Sunbury County
- In office 1870 to 1874

Personal details
- Born: May 27, 1834 Cambridge, New Brunswick
- Died: June 16, 1924 (aged 90) Maugerville, New Brunswick
- Party: Liberal Party of New Brunswick

Archibald Harrison (May 27, 1834 – June 16, 1924) was a farmer and political figure in New Brunswick, Canada. He represented Sunbury County in the Legislative Assembly of New Brunswick from 1870 to 1874 as a Liberal member.

He was born in Cambridge, New Brunswick, the son of Charles Harrison, who served in the province's Legislative Council. In 1862, Harrison married Amy Barker. He served as warden for Sunbury County and also was a member of the senate for the University of New Brunswick. He ran unsuccessfully for a seat in the provincial assembly in 1868. In 1874, he was named to the Legislative Council. Harrison was named to the province's Executive Council in 1883 and was a member of that body until its dissolution in 1892.

His brother Charles also served in the provincial assembly. He died in 1924 in Maugerville.
