= John Berryman (disambiguation) =

John Berryman (1914–1972) was an American poet and scholar.

John Berryman may also refer to:

- John Berryman (VC) (1825–1896), British soldier
- John Berryman (politician) (1828–1900), Canadian physician and political figure
