= 27th New Brunswick general election =

The 27th New Brunswick general election may refer to

- the 1890 New Brunswick general election, the 27th overall general election for New Brunswick, for the 27th New Brunswick Legislative Assembly, but considered the 7th general election for the Canadian province of New Brunswick, or
- the 1970 New Brunswick general election, the 47th overall general election for New Brunswick, for the 47th New Brunswick Legislative Assembly, but considered the 27th general election for the Canadian province of New Brunswick.
