= 9th New Brunswick general election =

9th New Brunswick general election may refer to:

- 1827 New Brunswick general election, the 9th general election to take place in the Colony of New Brunswick, for the 9th New Brunswick Legislative Assembly
- 1895 New Brunswick general election, the 29th overall general election for New Brunswick, for the 29th New Brunswick Legislative Assembly, but considered the 9th general election for the Canadian province of New Brunswick
