= William Beveridge (disambiguation) =

William Beveridge (1879–1963) was a British economist.

William Beveridge may also refer to:

- William Beveridge (bishop) (1637–1708), English Bishop of St Asaph
- William Beveridge (footballer) (1858–1941), Scottish footballer and athlete
- Bill Beveridge (1909–1995), Canadian ice hockey player
- William Blackwood Beveridge (1835–1890), Canadian merchant and political figure
- William Ian Beardmore Beveridge (1908–2006), Australian animal pathologist
