= Stephen Clark =

Stephen or Steve(n) Clark(e) may refer to:

== Arts and entertainment ==
- Stephen Carlton Clark (1882–1960), art collector and president of the Baseball Hall of Fame
- Steve Clark (tap dancer) (1924–2017), member of the tap-dancing duo The Clark Brothers
- Stephen Clarke (writer) (born 1958), British journalist and novelist
- Steve Clarke (drummer) (born 1959), British rock and heavy metal drummer
- Steve Clark (1960–1991), British guitarist for rock band Def Leppard
- Stephen Clark (playwright) (1961–2016), British playwright, librettist and lyricist
- Steven A. Clark, American pop and R&B singer, active 2011–present
- Stephen Clark (musician), American bassist for heavy metal band Deafheaven
- Steve Clarke, British rock bassist for Dumdums
- Steve Clark (animator), animator and director of animated television series
- Stephen Clarke-Willson, video game and software developer
- Steve Clarke (EastEnders), fictional character in the British soap opera Eastenders
- Steve Clark (actor) (1891–1954), American actor

== Politics ==
- Stephen Clark (New York treasurer) (1792–1871), New York State Treasurer 1856–1857
- Stephen D. Clark (1916–1997), Canadian politician, New Brunswick
- Stephen P. Clark (1924–1996), Mayor of Miami, Florida
- Stephen R. Clark (born 1966), American federal judge from Missouri
- Steve Clark (Canadian politician) (born 1960), Canadian politician, Ontario
- Steve Clark (Arkansas politician) (born 1947), Arkansas Attorney General

== Sports ==
- Steve Clark (swimmer) (1943–2026), American swimmer
- Stevan Clark (born 1959), American football defensive end
- Steve Clark (American football, born 1960), American pro football tackle
- Steve Clark (defensive back) (born 1962), American football defensive back
- Steven Clark (Australian footballer) (1961–2005), VFL/AFL player for three clubs
- Steve Clarke (born 1963), Scottish football player and manager
- Stephen Clarke (swimmer) (born 1973), Canadian swimmer
- Steven Clark (English footballer) (born 1982), English footballer
- Steven Clark (cricketer) (born 1982), Leicestershire cricketer
- Steve Clark (soccer) (born 1986), American soccer player
- Steven Clarke (gridiron football) (born 1991), Canadian football defensive back
- Steve Clark (referee), Australian rugby league referee

== Others ==
- Stephen C. Clark (bishop) (1892–1950), bishop of the Episcopal Diocese of Utah
- Stephen R. Clark, United States federal judge
- Stephen R. L. Clark (born 1945), British philosopher
- Steven Clarke (born 1949), American biochemist
- Stephen Clarke (archaeologist) (born 1942), Welsh archaeologist
- Steven Clark (born 1969), English man who disappeared in 1992

== See also ==
- Stephen Clark Foster (1822–1898), mayor of New York City
- Stephen Clark Foster (Maine politician) (1799–1872), U.S. representative from Maine
- Shooting of Stephon Clark, 2018 shooting in Sacramento, California involving a man similarly named Stephon Clark
