= Allister Bentley =

Canadian politician

Member of the Legislative Assembly of New Brunswick
- In office 1909–1912 Serving with L. Murray Curran
- In office 1922–1925 Serving with John Babington Macaulay Baxter, James Lowell
- Constituency: Saint John County

Personal details
- Born: March 18, 1854 Stewiacke, Nova Scotia
- Died: January 31, 1947 (aged 92) St. Martins, New Brunswick
- Party: New Brunswick Liberal Association
- Spouse(s): Mary Adams (m. 1878; died 1901) Mary J. Gray (m. 1903)
- Children: five
- Occupation: lumber manufacturer

Allister Fraser Bentley (March 18, 1854 – January 31, 1947) was a Canadian politician. He served in the Legislative Assembly of New Brunswick as member of the Liberal party representing Saint John County.
