= Henry Murphy (politician) =

Canadian politician (1921–2006)

Member of Parliament for Westmorland
- In office August 1953 – March 1958
- Preceded by: Edmund William George
- Succeeded by: William Creaghan

Personal details
- Born: Henry Joseph Murphy; 9 February 1921 Moncton, New Brunswick
- Died: 26 November 2006 (aged 85) Moncton, New Brunswick
- Party: Liberal
- Spouse: Joan Helena Barry (died 2006)
- Children: 5, including Mike Murphy
- Profession: Barrister, judge

Henry Joseph Murphy (9 February 1921 – 26 November 2006) was a Liberal party member of the House of Commons of Canada. He was born in Moncton, New Brunswick and became a barrister by career after attending the law program at the University of New Brunswick.

== Life and career ==
Murphy was born on February 9, 1921, in Moncton, New Brunswick, to parents Patrick Francis Murphy and Elizabeth A. Carey. He was a law student at the University of New Brunswick.

He was first elected at the Westmorland riding in the 1953 general election. Murphy was re-elected for a second term in 1957 then defeated in the 1958 election by William Creaghan of the Progressive Conservative party.

Murphy also served in municipal politics from 1951 to 1953 as both a city alderman for Moncton City Council and a regional councillor for Westmorland County.

In 1960, Murphy was appointed as a provincial judge by New Brunswick premier Louis Robichaud. Murphy had earlier competed against Robichaud for the role of provincial Liberal leader.

He was married to Joan Helena Barry and had four children; F. Patrick Murphy (engineer), Julia P. Murphy (teacher), Henry J. Murphy, QC (lawyer), and Michael B. Murphy (lawyer/politician). Upon his retirement from the bench Murphy was counsel with his son Henry's law firm Murphy Collette Murphy.

One of Murphy's nephews, Brian Murphy, became a Member of Parliament for Moncton—Riverview—Dieppe in 2006. His son Michael B. (Mike) Murphy is a prominent New Brunswick trial lawyer and was Minister of Health and later Attorney General, before resigning in January 2010 to return to the practice of law. In 2012, he followed in his father's footsteps to seek the leadership of the provincial Liberal Party but was also defeated by a young francophone lawyer from Kent County.

Murphy died on November 26, 2006, at the age of 85, although his obituary on The Toronto Star mistakenly said he was 89. His wife died earlier that year.

== Electoral record ==
1953 Canadian federal election: Westmoreland
Party	Candidate	Votes	%	±%
Liberal	Henry Murphy	20,160	54.4	-2.9
Progressive Conservative	William Gerald Stewart	14,788	39.9	+7.5
Co-operative Commonwealth	Claude Pearson Milton	2,099	5.7	-4.6

1957 Canadian federal election: Westmoreland
Party	Candidate	Votes	%	±%
Liberal	Henry Murphy	19,873	50.7	-3.7
Progressive Conservative	William Creaghan	16,478	42.0	+3.1
Social Credit	Silas Taylor	1,476	3.8	*
Co-operative Commonwealth	Edward McAllister	1,373	3.5	-2.2

1958 Canadian federal election: Westmoreland
Party	Candidate	Votes	%	±%
Progressive Conservative	William Creaghan	20,149	48.3	+6.3
Liberal	Henry Murphy	18,597	44.5	-6.2
Co-operative Commonwealth	Edward McAllister	2,478	5.9	+2.4
Social Credit	Silas Taylor	522	1.3	-2.5
