= Walter Powers =

Walter Powers may refer to:

- Walter Powers (musician), American bass guitarist
- Walter Powers (politician) (1895–1954), accountant and political figure in New Brunswick, Canada
- Walter W. Powers, politician in California
- Walter Powers II (1639–1708), co-founder of Littleton, Massachusetts, ancestor of two Revolutionary War patriots
