= 30th New Brunswick general election =

The 30th New Brunswick general election may refer to

- the 1890 New Brunswick general election, the 30th overall general election for New Brunswick, for the 30th New Brunswick Legislative Assembly, but considered the 10th general election for the Canadian province of New Brunswick, or
- the 1982 New Brunswick general election, the 50th overall general election for New Brunswick, for the 50th New Brunswick Legislative Assembly, but considered the 50th general election for the Canadian province of New Brunswick.
