= 1895 general election =

1895 general election may refer to:

- 1895 New Brunswick general election
- 1895 United Kingdom general election
