= Henry Read Emmerson =

Canadian politician (1883–1954)

The Hon. Henry Read Emmerson
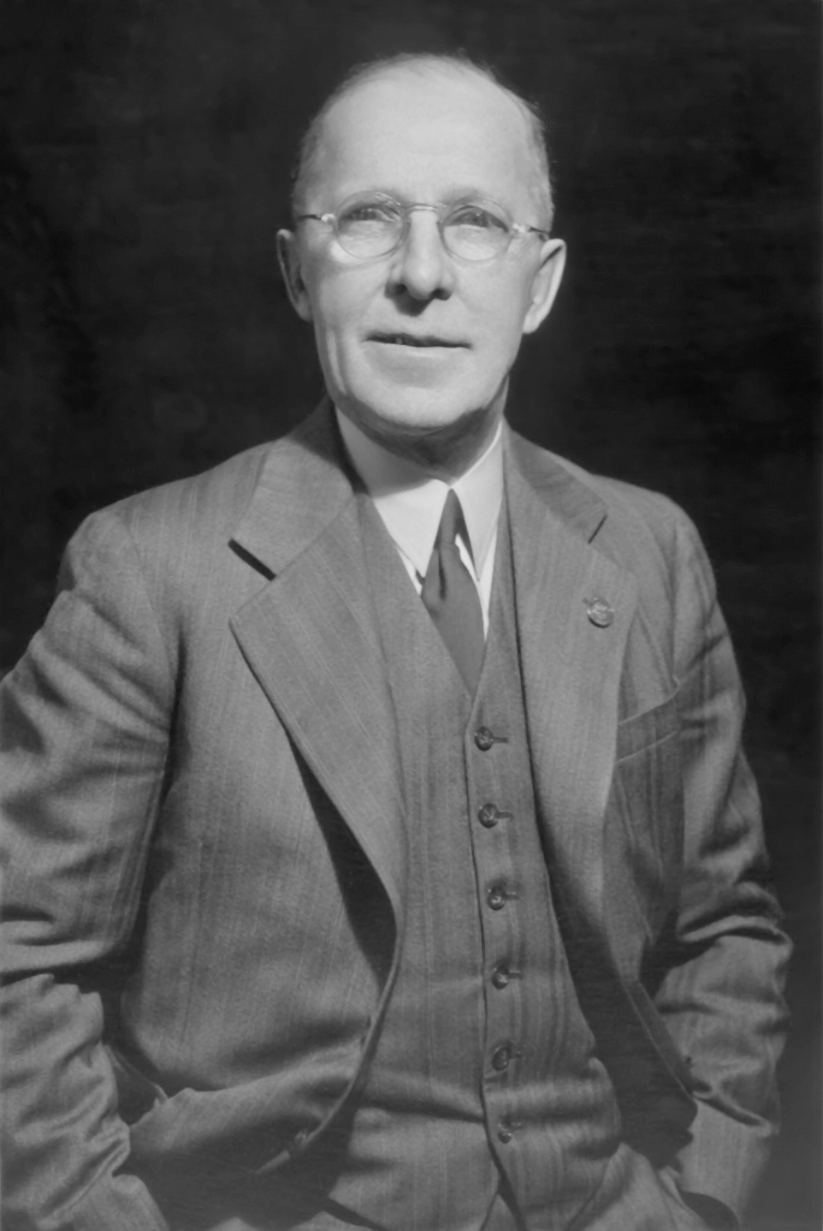

Member of the Canadian Parliament for Westmorland
- In office October 14, 1935 – June 24, 1949
- Preceded by: Otto Baird Price
- Succeeded by: Edmund William George

Senator for Dorchester, New Brunswick
- In office June 25, 1949 – June 21, 1954
- Appointed by: Louis St. Laurent

Personal details
- Born: November 7, 1883 Dorchester, New Brunswick
- Died: June 21, 1954 (aged 70)
- Party: Liberal

Henry Read Emmerson (November 7, 1883 – June 21, 1954) was a Canadian business executive, salesman, and politician.

Born in Dorchester, New Brunswick, the son of Henry Robert Emmerson and Emily Charlotte Record, he was defeated twice when he ran for the House of Commons of Canada as the Liberal candidate in the 1926 and 1930 federal elections for the riding of Westmorland. He was elected in the 1935 election and re-elected twice in 1940 and 1945. In 1949, he was appointed to the Senate of Canada representing the senatorial division of Dorchester, New Brunswick. He died in office in 1954.

== Electoral record ==
1926 Canadian federal election: Westmoreland
Party	Candidate	Votes	%	±%
Conservative	Otto Baird Price	10,737	51.3	-9.0
Liberal	Henry Read Emmerson	10,204	48.7	+9.0

1930 Canadian federal election: Westmoreland
Party	Candidate	Votes	%	±%
Conservative	Otto Baird Price	13,304	55.1	+3.8
Liberal	Henry Read Emmerson	10,836	44.9	-3.8
Source: lop.parl.ca

1935 Canadian federal election: Westmoreland
Party	Candidate	Votes	%	±%
Liberal	Henry Read Emmerson	16,307	62.8	+17.9
Conservative	Otto Baird Price	6,342	24.4	-30.7
Reconstruction	Charles Younger-Lewis	3,312	12.8	*

1940 Canadian federal election: Westmoreland
Party	Candidate	Votes	%	±%
Liberal	Henry Read Emmerson	16,431	61.6	-1.2
National Government	William Emmet McMonagle	10,259	38.4	+14.0

1945 Canadian federal election: Westmoreland
Party	Candidate	Votes	%	±%
Liberal	Henry Read Emmerson	17,251	53.0	-8.6
Progressive Conservative	William Alfred Walker	11,612	35.7	-2.7
Co-operative Commonwealth	Claude Pearson Milton	3,707	11.4	*
