= 8th New Brunswick general election =

8th New Brunswick general election may refer to:

- 1820 New Brunswick general election, the 8th general election to take place in the Colony of New Brunswick, for the 8th New Brunswick Legislative Assembly
- 1892 New Brunswick general election, the 28th overall general election for New Brunswick, for the 28th New Brunswick Legislative Assembly, but considered the 8th general election for the Canadian province of New Brunswick
