= Westmorland (federal electoral district) =

Former federal electoral district in New Brunswick, Canada

New Brunswick electoral district

Defunct federal electoral district
- Legislature: House of Commons
- District created: 1867
- District abolished: 1966
- First contested: 1867
- Last contested: 1965

Demographics
- Census division(s): Westmorland

Westmorland was a federal electoral district in New Brunswick, Canada, that was represented in the House of Commons of Canada from 1867 to 1968.

It was created by the British North America Act 1867, and was abolished in 1966 when it was redistributed into Westmorland—Kent and Moncton ridings.

It consisted of the County of Westmorland.

== Members of Parliament ==
This riding elected the following members of Parliament:

Parliament	Years	Member	Party
Westmorland
1st	1867–1872	Albert James Smith	Liberal
2nd	1872–1873	Albert James Smith	Liberal
2nd	1873–1874	Albert James Smith	Liberal
3rd	1874–1878	Albert James Smith	Liberal
4th	1878–1882	Albert James Smith	Liberal
5th	1882–1887	Josiah Wood	Conservative
6th	1887–1891	Josiah Wood	Conservative
7th	1891–1895	Josiah Wood	Conservative
7th	1895–1896	Henry Absalom Powell	Liberal–Conservative
8th	1896–1900	Henry Absalom Powell	Liberal–Conservative
9th	1900–1904	Henry Emmerson	Liberal
9th	1904–1904	Henry Emmerson	Liberal
10th	1904–1908	Henry Emmerson	Liberal
11th	1908–1911	Henry Emmerson	Liberal
12th	1911–1914	Henry Emmerson	Liberal
12th	1915–1917	Arthur Bliss Copp	Liberal
13th	1917–1921	Arthur Bliss Copp	Liberal
14th	1921–1922	Arthur Bliss Copp	Liberal
14th	1922–1925	Arthur Bliss Copp	Liberal
15th	1925–1926	Otto Baird Price	Conservative
16th	1926–1930	Otto Baird Price	Conservative
17th	1930–1935	Otto Baird Price	Conservative
18th	1935–1940	Henry Read Emmerson	Liberal
19th	1940–1945	Henry Read Emmerson	Liberal
20th	1945–1949	Henry Read Emmerson	Liberal
21st	1949–1953	Edmund William George	Liberal
22nd	1953–1957	Henry Murphy	Liberal
23rd	1957–1958	Henry Murphy	Liberal
24th	1958–1962	William Creaghan	Progressive Conservative
25th	1962–1963	Sherwood Rideout	Liberal
26th	1963–1964	Sherwood Rideout	Liberal
26th	1964–1965	Margaret Rideout	Liberal
27th	1965–1968	Margaret Rideout	Liberal
Riding dissolved into Westmorland—Kent and Moncton

== Election results ==
1867 Canadian federal election
Party	Candidate	Votes	%
Liberal	Albert James Smith	2,207	82.9
Conservative	Israël Landry	454	17.1

1872 Canadian federal election
Party	Candidate	Votes	%	±%
Liberal	Albert Smith	acclaimed		
Source: Canadian Elections Database

By-election: on Mr. Smith being appointed Minister of Marine and Fisheries:

By-election on 7 November 1873
Party	Candidate	Votes
Liberal	Albert James Smith	acclaimed

1874 Canadian federal election
Party	Candidate	Votes	%	±%
Liberal	Albert James Smith	acclaimed		
Source: lop.parl.ca

1878 Canadian federal election
Party	Candidate	Votes	%	±%
Liberal	Albert James Smith	2,572	57.2	
Unknown	R.A. Chapman	1,928	42.8	

1882 Canadian federal election
Party	Candidate	Votes	%	±%
Conservative	Josiah Wood	2,620	54.5	+11.7
Liberal	Albert James Smith	2,188	45.5	-11.7

1887 Canadian federal election
Party	Candidate	Votes	%	±%
Conservative	Josiah Wood	3,252	54.5	n/c
Liberal	Henry Emmerson	2,710	45.5	n/c

1891 Canadian federal election
Party	Candidate	Votes	%	±%
Conservative	Josiah Wood	4,205	67.2	+12.7
Liberal	William F. George	2,057	32.8	-12.7

By-election: on Mr. Wood being called to the Senate:

By-election on 5 August 1895
Party	Candidate	Votes
Liberal-Conservative	Henry A. Powell	acclaimed

1896 Canadian federal election
Party	Candidate	Votes	%	±%
Liberal-Conservative	Henry A. Powell	3,442	50.1	-17.1
Liberal	C.N. Robinson	3,427	49.9	+17.1

1900 Canadian federal election
Party	Candidate	Votes	%	±%
Liberal	Henry Emmerson	4,420	52.9	+3.0
Conservative	Henry A. Powell	3,934	47.1	-3.0

By-election: on Mr. Emmerson being appointed Minister of Railways and Canals:

By-election on 30 January 1904
Party	Candidate	Votes
Liberal	Henry Emmerson	acclaimed

1904 Canadian federal election
Party	Candidate	Votes	%	±%
Liberal	Henry Emmerson	4,693	55.6	+2.7
Conservative	Henry A. Powell	3,747	44.4	-2.7

1908 Canadian federal election
Party	Candidate	Votes	%	±%
Liberal	Henry Emmerson	5,047	58.0	+2.4
Conservative	Frederick William Sumner	3,662	42.0	-2.4

1911 Canadian federal election
Party	Candidate	Votes	%	±%
Liberal	Henry Emmerson	4,452	50.4	-7.6
Unknown	Medley Godfrey Siddall	4,388	49.6	+7.6

By-election: on Mr. Emmerson's death:

By-election on 1 February 1915
Party	Candidate	Votes
Liberal	Arthur Bliss Copp	acclaimed

1917 Canadian federal election
Party	Candidate	Votes	%	±%
Opposition	Arthur Bliss Copp	6,645	57.2	+6.8
Government	Otto Baird Price	4,982	42.8	-6.8

1921 Canadian federal election
Party	Candidate	Votes	%	±%
Liberal	Arthur Bliss Copp	12,646	61.4	+4.2
Conservative	Otto Baird Price	4,884	23.7	-19.1
Progressive	Albert Ernest Trites	3,059	14.9	*

By-election: on Mr. Copp's appointment as Secretary of State of Canada:

By-election on 19 January 1922
Party	Candidate	Votes
Liberal	Arthur Bliss Copp	acclaimed

1925 Canadian federal election
Party	Candidate	Votes	%	±%
Conservative	Otto Baird Price	11,806	60.3	+36.6
Liberal	Ernest Albert Smith	7,780	39.7	-21.7

1926 Canadian federal election
Party	Candidate	Votes	%	±%
Conservative	Otto Baird Price	10,737	51.3	-9.0
Liberal	Henry Read Emmerson	10,204	48.7	+9.0

1930 Canadian federal election
Party	Candidate	Votes	%	±%
Conservative	Otto Baird Price	13,304	55.1	+3.8
Liberal	Henry Read Emmerson	10,836	44.9	-3.8
Source: lop.parl.ca

1935 Canadian federal election
Party	Candidate	Votes	%	±%
Liberal	Henry Read Emmerson	16,307	62.8	+17.9
Conservative	Otto Baird Price	6,342	24.4	-30.7
Reconstruction	Charles Younger-Lewis	3,312	12.8	*

1940 Canadian federal election
Party	Candidate	Votes	%	±%
Liberal	Henry Read Emmerson	16,431	61.6	-1.2
National Government	William Emmet McMonagle	10,259	38.4	+14.0

1945 Canadian federal election
Party	Candidate	Votes	%	±%
Liberal	Henry Read Emmerson	17,251	53.0	-8.6
Progressive Conservative	William Alfred Walker	11,612	35.7	-2.7
Co-operative Commonwealth	Claude Pearson Milton	3,707	11.4	*

1949 Canadian federal election
Party	Candidate	Votes	%	±%
Liberal	Edmund William George	20,649	57.3	+4.3
Progressive Conservative	John Edward Murphy	11,696	32.4	-3.3
Co-operative Commonwealth	William Robert Rogers	3,702	10.3	-1.1

1953 Canadian federal election
Party	Candidate	Votes	%	±%
Liberal	Henry Murphy	20,160	54.4	-2.9
Progressive Conservative	William Gerald Stewart	14,788	39.9	+7.5
Co-operative Commonwealth	Claude Pearson Milton	2,099	5.7	-4.6

1957 Canadian federal election
Party	Candidate	Votes	%	±%
Liberal	Henry Murphy	19,873	50.7	-3.7
Progressive Conservative	William Creaghan	16,478	42.0	+3.1
Social Credit	Silas Taylor	1,476	3.8	*
Co-operative Commonwealth	Edward McAllister	1,373	3.5	-2.2

1958 Canadian federal election
Party	Candidate	Votes	%	±%
Progressive Conservative	William Creaghan	20,149	48.3	+6.3
Liberal	Henry Murphy	18,597	44.5	-6.2
Co-operative Commonwealth	Edward McAllister	2,478	5.9	+2.4
Social Credit	Silas Taylor	522	1.3	-2.5

1962 Canadian federal election
Party	Candidate	Votes	%	±%
Liberal	Sherwood Rideout	18,334	42.8	-1.7
Progressive Conservative	William Creaghan	17,818	41.6	-6.7
New Democratic Party	Edward McAllister	5,848	13.7	+7.8
Social Credit	John Bampton	836	2.0	+0.7

1963 Canadian federal election
Party	Candidate	Votes	%	±%
Liberal	Sherwood Rideout	19,989	48.1	+5.3
Progressive Conservative	Jean-Paul LeBlanc	16,356	39.4	-2.2
New Democratic Party	Edward McAllister	4,415	10.6	-3.1
Social Credit	John Bampton	771	1.9	-0.1

By-election: on Mr. Rideout's death:

By-election on 9 November 1964
Party	Candidate	Votes
Liberal	Margaret Rideout	20,401	55.0	+6.9
Progressive Conservative	Edward Murphy	14,090	38.0	-1.4
New Democratic Party	Henry Landry	2,615	7.0	-3.6

1965 Canadian federal election
Party	Candidate	Votes	%	±%
Liberal	Margaret Rideout	20,768	49.7	-5.3
Progressive Conservative	R.F. Robinson	15,090	36.1	-1.9
New Democratic Party	John Dimick	5,943	14.2	+7.2

== See also ==
- List of Canadian electoral districts
- Historical federal electoral districts of Canada
