= John James Robinson =

Canadian politician

Member of the Legislative Assembly of New Brunswick
- In office 1850–1854
- Constituency: Charlotte County

Member of the Legislative Council of New Brunswick
- In office 1856–1860
- Constituency: Charlotte County

Personal details
- Born: 1811 West Ham, Essex, England
- Died: 1874 (aged 62–63) Campobello Island, New Brunswick

John James Robinson-Owen (January 1811 – 1874) was a naval officer and political figure in England and New Brunswick. He represented Charlotte County in the Legislative Assembly of New Brunswick from 1850 to 1854.

He was born in West Ham, Essex, the son of Captain J. J. Robinson, and educated in England. Robinson served in the Royal Navy from 1824 to 1845, retiring as captain. He also maintained a home at Surrey in England. In 1839, he married Cornelia, the daughter of William Fitzwilliam Owen. Robinson was named to the Legislative Council of New Brunswick in 1856. He served as commissioner for lighthouse for the provinces. Robinson, now known as Robinson-Owen, also took over responsibility for administering Campobello Island during his father-in-law's later years and became owner of the island with his wife after Owen died in 1857. The Owen property was sold in 1881 to a group of Boston and New York businessmen. James Roosevelt of the Roosevelt family purchased several acres of land and had a summer home constructed; other wealthy visitors did the same.

== See also ==
- O'Byrne, William Richard (1849). "Robinson, John James" . A Naval Biographical Dictionary . John Murray – via Wikisource.
