= Margaret Rideout =

Canadian politician

- Official 1968 portrait

Member of Parliament for Westmorland
- In office 9 November 1964 – 24 June 1968
- Preceded by: Sherwood Rideout
- Succeeded by: Riding dissolved

Personal details
- Born: Margaret Isabel Saunders; 16 June 1923 Bridgewater, Nova Scotia, Canada
- Died: 5 December 2010 (aged 87)
- Party: Liberal
- Spouse: Sherwood Rideout (m. 1943–1964)
- Children: 3, including George
- Occupation: Homemaker

Margaret Isabel Rideout (née Saunders; 16 June 1923 – 12 May 2010) was a Canadian politician, who represented the electoral district of Westmorland in the House of Commons of Canada from 1964 to 1968. She was the first woman elected to the House of Commons from New Brunswick.

She was born to parents Vance and Dolena (McRae) Saunders of Bridgewater. A Liberal, Rideout first won the riding in a 1964 by-election following the death of Sherwood Rideout, her husband and the district's incumbent Member of Parliament.

She was re-elected in 1965, and was named parliamentary secretary to the Minister of Health and Welfare in 1966. She served in that role until the 1968 election, when she was defeated by Charlie Thomas in the redistricted riding of Moncton. After her service in Parliament was finished she worked as a Judge of the Court of Canadian Citizenship and ultimately became the Chief Judge. She was subsequently named a citizenship judge. She was a member of several Boards the likes of the Board of Governors at Acadia University where she was awarded an Honorary Doctor of Civil Laws Degree, the Board of the Atlantic Baptist Senior Citizens Home, the Salvation Army, the Canadian Bible Society, the Business and Professional Women's Association and was a long serving member of Board of the Moncton Hospital. She received the Muriel McQueen Fergusson Award in New Brunswick for her work for women. Margaret Rideout was the "public face of the Atlantic Division’s successful campaign to improve drug coverage to Newfoundland and Labrador".

Margaret Rideout had three sons. Sherwood and Margaret Rideout's son George served in the House of Commons in the 1990s, and served a term as mayor of Moncton.

1968 Canadian federal election: Moncton—Riverview—Dieppe
Party	Candidate	Votes	%
Progressive Conservative	Charlie Thomas	17,969	50.10
Liberal	Margaret Rideout	15,013	41.86
New Democratic	Barrie N. Hould	2,332	6.50
Independent	R.F. Robinson	553	1.54
Total valid votes		35,867	
