= Benjamin Beveridge =

Canadian politician

Benjamin Beveridge (June 10, 1811 – October 7, 1885) was a Scottish-born merchant and political figure in New Brunswick. He represented Victoria County in the Legislative Assembly of New Brunswick from 1863 to 1869.

== Biography ==
Beveridge was born in Kinross-shire, the son of William Beveridge and Betty Blackwood. He was involved in the trade in lumber at Tobique and Andover, retiring from business in 1874. He also was a justice of the peace. In 1834, he married Joanna Taylor. In 1869, Beveridge was named to the Legislative Council where he served until May of 1882. He also served as a member of the Executive Council from 1867 to 1871. He relocated to Appleton, Wisconsin in his retirement to join family members and died there on October 7, 1885.

His son William Blackwood Beveridge and his stepbrother Adam Beveridge also served in the provincial assembly.
