= Arthur Bliss Copp =

Canadian politician (1870–1949)

The Honourable Arthur Bliss Copp PC
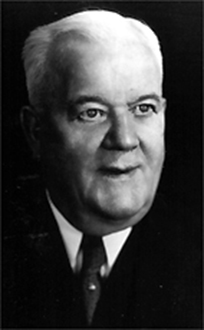
- The Honourable Arthur Bliss Copp, PC

Member of the New Brunswick Legislative Assembly for Westmorland
- In office 1901–1912

Leader of the Opposition of the New Brunswick Legislative Assembly
- In office 1912–1912
- Preceded by: Clifford William Robinson
- Succeeded by: Louis-Auguste Dugal

Member of the Canadian Parliament for Westmorland
- In office 1915–1925
- Preceded by: Henry Emmerson
- Succeeded by: Otto Baird Price

Secretary of State of Canada
- In office December 29, 1921 – September 24, 1925
- Prime Minister: W. L. Mackenzie King
- Preceded by: Rodolphe Monty
- Succeeded by: Walter Edward Foster

Senator for Westmorland, New Brunswick
- In office September 25, 1925 – December 5, 1949
- Nominated by: W. L. Mackenzie King
- Appointed by: The Viscount Byng of Vimy

Personal details
- Born: July 10, 1870 Jolicure, New Brunswick, Canada
- Died: December 5, 1949 (aged 79)
- Party: Liberal Party of Canada
- Other political affiliations: Liberal Party of New Brunswick

Arthur Bliss Copp PC (July 10, 1870 – December 5, 1949) was a Canadian politician.

Born in Jolicure, New Brunswick, to Joseph Harvey Copp and Frances Lydia Brennan. He was a lawyer before being elected to the Legislative Assembly of New Brunswick in a 1901 by-election; he represented Westmorland County until 1912. He was first elected to the House of Commons of Canada for the New Brunswick riding of Westmorland in a 1915 by-election. A Liberal, he was re-elected in 1917 and 1921. From 1921 to 1925, he was the Secretary of State of Canada. In 1925, he was called to the Senate of Canada representing the senatorial division of Westmorland, New Brunswick. He died in office in 1949. He is buried in the Sackville Rural Cemetery in Sackville, New Brunswick.

== Electoral record ==
By-election on 1 February 1915
Party	Candidate	Votes
Liberal	Arthur Bliss Copp	acclaimed

1917 Canadian federal election: Westmoreland
Party	Candidate	Votes	%	±%
Opposition	Arthur Bliss Copp	6,645	57.2	+6.8
Government	Otto Baird Price	4,982	42.8	-6.8

1921 Canadian federal election: Westmoreland
Party	Candidate	Votes	%	±%
Liberal	Arthur Bliss Copp	12,646	61.4	+4.2
Conservative	Otto Baird Price	4,884	23.7	-19.1
Progressive	Albert Ernest Trites	3,059	14.9	*
