= William Creaghan =

Canadian politician

William Lawrence Marven Creaghan

Alderman, City of Moncton
- In office 1952–1958

Member of Parliament for Westmorland
- In office March 1958 – June 1962
- Preceded by: Henry Murphy
- Succeeded by: Sherwood Rideout

Personal details
- Born: 30 May 1922 Newcastle, New Brunswick
- Died: 1 October 2008 (aged 86) Fredericton, New Brunswick
- Party: Progressive Conservative
- Spouse: Thérèse LeBlanc
- Profession: barrister, judge

William Lawrence Marven Creaghan (30 May 1922 – 1 October 2008) was a Progressive Conservative party member of the House of Commons of Canada. He was born in Newcastle, New Brunswick and became a barrister and judge by career.

Between 1952 and 1958, Creaghan was a Moncton city alderman at large.

After an unsuccessful attempt to win a Parliamentary seat at New Brunswick's Westmorland riding in the 1957 federal election, Creaghan won the seat in the following year's election. After serving only one term, the 24th Canadian Parliament, Creaghan was defeated in his riding in the 1962 election by Sherwood Rideout of the Liberal party.

After leaving federal office, Creaghan was a judge in various New Brunswick courts until his retirement in 1997. He died at Fredericton at age 86.

1958 Canadian federal election: Westmoreland
Party	Candidate	Votes	%	±%
Progressive Conservative	William Creaghan	20,149	48.3	+6.3
Liberal	Henry Murphy	18,597	44.5	-6.2
Co-operative Commonwealth	Edward McAllister	2,478	5.9	+2.4
Social Credit	Silas Taylor	522	1.3	-2.5
