= H. Colby Smith =

Canadian politician

Member of the Legislative Assembly of New Brunswick
- In office 1926–1939
- Constituency: Saint John County

Personal details
- Born: August 21, 1869 York County, New Brunswick
- Died: May 14, 1953 (aged 83) Saint John, New Brunswick
- Party: Progressive Conservative Party of New Brunswick
- Spouse: Mary Maud Gregory
- Children: Alphonso C. Smith
- Education: Lancaster, New Brunswick
- Occupation: businessman

Harry Colby Smith (August 21, 1869 – May 14, 1953) was a Canadian politician. He served in the Legislative Assembly of New Brunswick as a member of the Progressive Conservative Party from 1926 to 1939. His father, Albert Colby Smith, along with his son, Alphonso C. Smith also served in the Legislative Assembly.
