= Harold C. Atkinson =

Canadian politician (1900–1977)

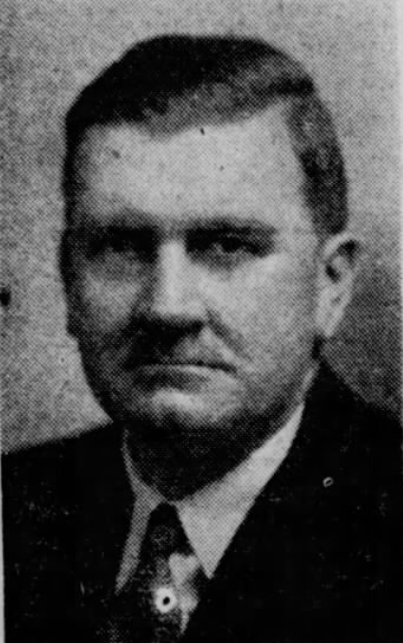
- Atkinson, pictured in a 1948 newspaper

Member of the Legislative Assembly of New Brunswick
- In office 1948–1952
- Constituency: Saint John County

Personal details
- Born: March 27, 1900 Sherbrooke, Quebec
- Died: 1977 (aged 76–77)
- Party: New Brunswick Liberal Association
- Spouse: Edith Katherine Marianne DeGeer
- Occupation: pulp mill superintendent

Harold Corlett Atkinson (March 27, 1900 – 1977) was a Canadian politician. He served in the Legislative Assembly of New Brunswick as member of the Liberal party from 1948 to 1952.
