= James Mitchell (Canadian politician) =

Canadian politician

8th Premier of New Brunswick
- In office July 17, 1896 – October 29, 1897
- Monarch: Victoria
- Lieutenant Governor: John James Fraser; Abner Reid McClelan
- Preceded by: Andrew George Blair
- Succeeded by: Henry Emmerson

MLA for Charlotte
- In office June 14, 1882 – December 15, 1897 Serving with John McAdam, James E. Lynott, William Douglas, George F. Hill, James Russell, George F. Hibbard, James O'Brien
- Preceded by: Thomas Cottrell
- Succeeded by: John Dewolfe Chipman

Personal details
- Born: March 16, 1843 Scotch Settlement, York County, New Brunswick, British North America
- Died: December 15, 1897 (aged 54) St. Stephen, New Brunswick, Canada
- Resting place: St. Stephen Rural Cemetery
- Party: Liberal
- Spouse: Mary Anne Ryder (m. 1873)
- Children: 1 daughter
- Education: Fredericton Collegiate School, University of New Brunswick
- Occupation: Lawyer and schoolteacher
- Profession: Politician

James Mitchell (March 16, 1843 – December 15, 1897) was a politician in the Province of New Brunswick, Canada. Prior to entering politics, Mitchell was a schoolteacher and a prominent lawyer in St. Stephen, New Brunswick.

In 1882 he was elected to the provincial legislature as a Liberal MLA. Appointed to the Executive Council, he served as Surveyor-General, Commissioner of Agriculture, Receiver-General and Provincial Secretary.

Mitchell became the eighth premier of New Brunswick in 1896 but resigned in 1897 due to ill health and died shortly thereafter.

Mitchell is buried in the St. Stephen Rural Cemetery in St. Stephen, with his wife Mary Ann (Ryder) and 2-year-old daughter, Christine.
