= Parker D. Mitchell =

Canadian politician (1900–1963)

Member of the Legislative Assembly of New Brunswick
- In office 1960–1963
- Constituency: Saint John County

Personal details
- Born: December 21, 1900 Lincoln, New Brunswick
- Died: April 2, 1963 (aged 62) Fredericton, New Brunswick
- Party: Progressive Conservative Party of New Brunswick
- Spouse: Ethel May Chittick
- Occupation: businessman

Parker Dufferin Mitchell (December 21, 1900 – April 2, 1963) was a Canadian politician. He served in the Legislative Assembly of New Brunswick as member of the Progressive Conservative party from 1960 to his death in 1963.
