= John G. Bryden =

Canadian politician (1937–2016)

The Honourable John G. Bryden B.A., LL.B.

Senator for New Brunswick
- In office November 23, 1994 – October 31, 2009

Personal details
- Born: August 25, 1937 Port Elgin, New Brunswick, Canada
- Died: July 24, 2016 (aged 78)
- Party: Liberal Party of Canada
- Education: Mount Allison University; University of Pennsylvania
- Profession: Lawyer

John G. Bryden (August 25, 1937 – July 24, 2016) is a former Canadian Senator.

A lawyer, former public servant and businessman, Bryden was summoned to the Senate as a Liberal by Governor General Ray Hnatyshyn, on the advice of Prime Minister Jean Chrétien, on November 23, 1994. He represented the province of New Brunswick until his resignation on October 31, 2009.
