= Edward Claude Seeley =

Canadian politician

Member of the Legislative Assembly of New Brunswick
- In office 1945–1948
- Constituency: Saint John County

Personal details
- Born: May 25, 1884 Blissville Parish, New Brunswick
- Died: September 25, 1969 (aged 85) New Brunswick
- Party: Progressive Conservative Party of New Brunswick
- Spouse: Mary Josephine Foster
- Occupation: farmer

Edward Claude Seeley (May 25, 1884 – September 25, 1969) was a Canadian politician. He served in the Legislative Assembly of New Brunswick as member of the Progressive Conservative party from 1945 to 1948.
