= Sherwood Rideout =

Canadian politician

Mayor of Moncton, New Brunswick
- In office 1961–1963
- Preceded by: Michael Baig
- Succeeded by: Leonard Jones

Member of Parliament for Westmorland
- In office 1962–1964
- Preceded by: William Creaghan
- Succeeded by: Margaret Rideout

Personal details
- Born: Sherwood Hayes Rideout; July 17, 1917 Moncton, New Brunswick
- Died: May 29, 1964 (aged 46)
- Party: Liberal
- Spouse: Margaret Rideout
- Children: George Rideout
- Occupation: Trainmaster

Sherwood Hayes Rideout (July 17, 1917 – May 29, 1964) was a Canadian politician, who represented the electoral district of Westmorland from 1962 until his death in 1964. Prior to his election to the House of Commons of Canada, he was the mayor of the City of Moncton. During World War 2, Rideout acted as a train-master and was considered a key figure in the management of the train system and logistics planning that allowed vehicles, supplies and troop transports to be shipped through Moncton (known as the Hub City) to the port in Halifax.

A Liberal, he was elected in the 1962 election. Following his death from a heart attack, on a train bound for Moncton from Ottawa, he was succeeded by his widow Margaret, the first woman from New Brunswick to be elected to the House of Commons. Their son George also served in the House of Commons in the 1990s.

== Personal life ==
Sherwood Rideout was the son of George R. Rideout, the former Police Chief of Moncton. His sibling were, Charles T. Rideout, who was an assistant to the vice-president of CN, Catherine who lived in Bermuda for most of her life, and Georgina "Georgie" Rideout Seeley, who was a nurse during ww2, and was married to Murray Seeley, a wealthy businessman.

1962 Canadian federal election: Westmoreland
Party	Candidate	Votes	%	±%
Liberal	Sherwood Rideout	18,334	42.8	-1.7
Progressive Conservative	William Creaghan	17,818	41.6	-6.7
New Democratic Party	Edward McAllister	5,848	13.7	+7.8
Social Credit	John Bampton	836	2.0	+0.7

1963 Canadian federal election: Westmoreland
Party	Candidate	Votes	%	±%
Liberal	Sherwood Rideout	19,989	48.1	+5.3
Progressive Conservative	Jean-Paul LeBlanc	16,356	39.4	-2.2
New Democratic Party	Edward McAllister	4,415	10.6	-3.1
Social Credit	John Bampton	771	1.9	-0.1
