= Otto Baird Price =

Canadian politician

Member of the House of Commons of Canada for Westmorland
- In office 1925–1935

Member of the Legislative Assembly of New Brunswick for the City of Moncton
- In office 1912–1920

Personal details
- Born: September 16, 1877 Petitcodiac, New Brunswick, Canada
- Died: January 18, 1947 (aged 69)
- Party: Conservative
- Spouse: Clare B. Sibler
- Occupation: Dentist

Otto Baird Price (September 16, 1877 – January 18, 1947) was a dentist and political figure in New Brunswick, Canada. He represented the City of Moncton in the Legislative Assembly of New Brunswick from 1912 to 1920 and Westmorland in the House of Commons of Canada from 1925 to 1935 as a Unionist and Conservative member.

He was born in Petitcodiac, New Brunswick, the son of Warren W. Price and Helena Crandall. In 1904, he married Clare B. Sibler. Price ran unsuccessfully for a seat in the House of Commons in 1917 and 1921. He was defeated in a bid for reelection in 1935.

== Electoral record ==
1917 Canadian federal election: Westmoreland
Party	Candidate	Votes	%	±%
Opposition	Arthur Bliss Copp	6,645	57.2	+6.8
Government	Otto Baird Price	4,982	42.8	-6.8

1921 Canadian federal election: Westmoreland
Party	Candidate	Votes	%	±%
Liberal	Arthur Bliss Copp	12,646	61.4	+4.2
Conservative	Otto Baird Price	4,884	23.7	-19.1
Progressive	Albert Ernest Trites	3,059	14.9	*

By-election: on Mr. Copp's appointment as Secretary of State of Canada:

By-election on 19 January 1922
Party	Candidate	Votes
Liberal	Arthur Bliss Copp	acclaimed

1925 Canadian federal election: Westmoreland
Party	Candidate	Votes	%	±%
Conservative	Otto Baird Price	11,806	60.3	+36.6
Liberal	Ernest Albert Smith	7,780	39.7	-21.7

1926 Canadian federal election: Westmoreland
Party	Candidate	Votes	%	±%
Conservative	Otto Baird Price	10,737	51.3	-9.0
Liberal	Henry Read Emmerson	10,204	48.7	+9.0

1930 Canadian federal election: Westmoreland
Party	Candidate	Votes	%	±%
Conservative	Otto Baird Price	13,304	55.1	+3.8
Liberal	Henry Read Emmerson	10,836	44.9	-3.8
Source: lop.parl.ca

1935 Canadian federal election: Westmoreland
Party	Candidate	Votes	%	±%
Liberal	Henry Read Emmerson	16,307	62.8	+17.9
Conservative	Otto Baird Price	6,342	24.4	-30.7
Reconstruction	Charles Younger-Lewis	3,312	12.8	*
