= Prosper E. Paulin =

Canadian politician

Prosper Elize Paulin (born October 1844) was a teacher, auctioneer and political figure in New Brunswick, Canada. He was elected in the 1895 provincial election to represent Gloucester County in the Legislative Assembly of New Brunswick as a Conservative member. He served until 1899.

He was born in Caraquet, New Brunswick. In 1869, he married Vitaline Gauvin. Paulin served as commissioner for the parish court, municipal councillor and county warden. He served in the local militia and was also a justice of the peace.

Legislative Assembly of New Brunswick
Preceded by ?	MLA for Gloucester County; 1895-1899	Succeeded by ?
