= Donald Morrison (politician) =

Canadian politician

Donald Morrison (November 27, 1852 – September 4, 1920) was a merchant and political figure in the Province of New Brunswick, Canada. He represented Northumberland County in the Legislative Assembly of New Brunswick from 1903 to 1908 as a Conservative member.

He was born in Burnt Church, New Brunswick, the son of Alexander and Elizabeth Morrison, Scottish immigrants, and was educated in Alwick and Chatham. In 1878, Morrison married Jane Elizabeth Fish. He served as mayor of Newcastle, New Brunswick and was a member of the county council, also serving as county warden. Morrison ran unsuccessfully for a seat in the provincial assembly in 1895 and 1899. He was named speaker in 1908 but resigned his seat later that year to run unsuccessfully for a federal seat. He was also an unsuccessful candidate in the 1911 federal election.

Political offices
Preceded by Charles J. Osman	Speaker of the Legislative Assembly of New Brunswick; 1908	Succeeded by George Johnson Clarke
