= Stephen D. Clark =

Canadian politician (1916–1997)

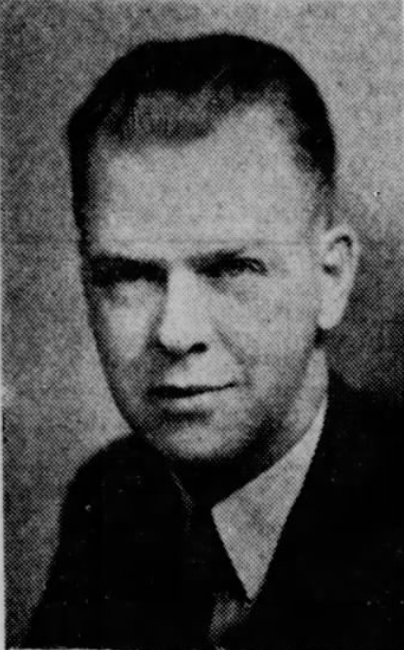
- Clark, pictured in a 1948 newspaper

Member of the Legislative Assembly of New Brunswick
- In office 1948–1952
- Constituency: Saint John County

Personal details
- Born: May 15, 1916 Fairville, New Brunswick
- Died: January 5, 1997 (aged 80) Saint John, New Brunswick
- Party: New Brunswick Liberal Association
- Spouse: June Denise Power
- Occupation: physician

Stephen Douglas Clark (May 15, 1916 – January 5, 1997) was a Canadian politician. He served in the Legislative Assembly of New Brunswick as member of the Liberal party from 1948 to 1952.
