= George Thomas Baird =

Canadian politician (1847–1917)

The Hon. George Thomas Baird
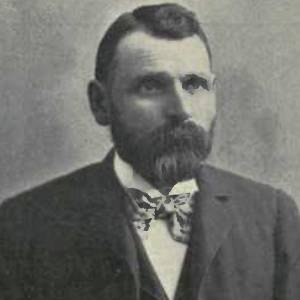

Senator for Victoria, New Brunswick
- In office June 19, 1895 – April 21, 1917
- Appointed by: Mackenzie Bowell

Member of the Legislative Assembly of New Brunswick for Victoria
- In office 1884–1890
- Preceded by: Richard Tibbits
- Succeeded by: James Porter
- In office 1892–1895
- Preceded by: James Porter
- Succeeded by: James Porter

Member of the Legislative Council of New Brunswick
- In office 1891–1892

Personal details
- Born: November 3, 1847 Andover, New Brunswick
- Died: April 21, 1917 (aged 69)
- Party: Conservative
- Other political affiliations: New Brunswick Conservative Party

George Thomas Baird (November 3, 1847 – April 21, 1917) was a Canadian politician.

Born in Andover, New Brunswick, the eldest son of George Baird of Scottish descent, he was educated at Carleton County Grammar School. He was married November 12, 1879 to Ida T. Sadler, of St. John, N.B. He held a first class certificate from the Normal School of New Brunswick, and for six years he taught a Superior School and was also Postmaster from 1878 until 1882. He became a lumber merchant and general dealer in Perth Centre, New Brunswick starting in 1874.

He was first elected to the Legislative Assembly of New Brunswick in 1884. He was appointed to the Legislative Council of New Brunswick in April 1891 and served until its abolition in 1892. At the general election held in 1892 he was again elected to the Legislative Assembly, where he sat until June 19, 1895 when he was called to the Senate on the advice of Mackenzie Bowell. A Conservative, he represented the senatorial division of Victoria, New Brunswick and served for almost 22 years until his death in 1917.
