= William Blackwood Beveridge =

Canadian politician

William Blackwood Beveridge (December 16, 1835 – April 13, 1890) was a merchant and political figure in New Brunswick. He represented Victoria County in the Legislative Assembly of New Brunswick from 1874 to 1882 as a Liberal-Conservative member.

He was born in Perth, Victoria County, New Brunswick, the son of Benjamin Beveridge and Joanna Taylor, and was educated at Mount Allison College. He worked in his father's store, later taking over the business, and also entered the lumber trade with his brother Henry Douglas. In 1862, he married Jane Elizabeth Stevens. Beveridge was postmaster at Andover, also serving as justice of the peace and as major in the local militia. In 1867, he ran unsuccessfully for a seat in the House of Commons. He was a member of the Masonic lodge. In 1882, he was named to the Legislative Council.

1867 Canadian federal election: Victoria, New Brunswick
Party	Candidate	Votes	%
Liberal–Conservative	John Costigan	778	57.93
Unknown	William Blackwood Beveridge	549	40.88
Unknown	James Workman	16	1.19
Unknown	James Tibbetts	0	0.00
Total valid votes		1,343	83.52
Eligible voters		1,608	
Source: 1867 Return of the Elections to House of Commons
