= James Lowell (politician) =

Former Canadian politician

Member of the Legislative Assembly of New Brunswick
- In office 1908–1912 Serving with Harrison A. McKeown, Allister F. Bentley
- Constituency: Saint John County

Personal details
- Born: December 25, 1867 St. Martins, New Brunswick
- Died: May 8, 1914 (aged 46) South Bay, New Brunswick
- Party: Independent
- Spouse: Isabella Lawson (m. 1887)
- Occupation: Lumber manufacturer

James Lowell (December 25, 1867 – May 8, 1914) was a Canadian politician. He served in the Legislative Assembly of New Brunswick from 1908 to 1912 as an Independent member.
