= Isaac Carpenter (Canadian politician) =

Former Canadian politician

Isaac W. Carpenter

Member of the Legislative Assembly of New Brunswick
- In office 1899–1908 Serving with Laughlin Farris
- Constituency: Queens

Personal details
- Born: June 22, 1849 Wickham, New Brunswick
- Died: October 13, 1933 (aged 84) Wickham, New Brunswick
- Party: Independent
- Spouse(s): Ida Woden (m. 1883; died 1887) Gertrude A. Carpenter (m. 1888)
- Occupation: Farmer

Isaac W. Carpenter (June 22, 1849 – October 13, 1933) was a Canadian politician. He served in the Legislative Assembly of New Brunswick as an Independent MLA from Queens County. He was elected in 1896 by-election. A farmer, it is likely he was elected as a Patrons of Industry candidate.
