= Alphonso C. Smith =

Canadian politician (1894–1945)

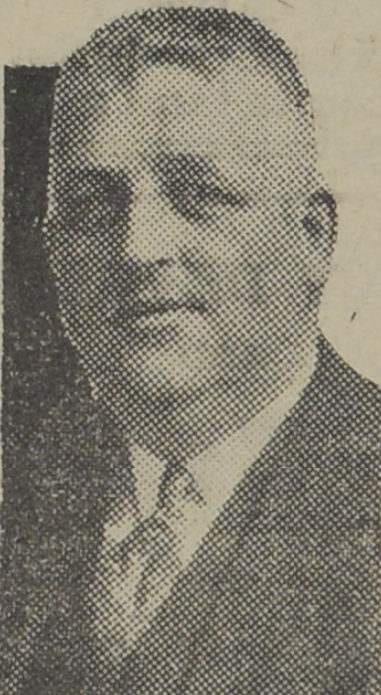
- Smith, pictured in a 1935 newspaper

Member of the Legislative Assembly of New Brunswick
- In office 1939–1945
- Constituency: Saint John County

Personal details
- Born: Alphonso Colby Smith; March 4, 1894 Saint John, New Brunswick
- Died: June 2, 1945 (aged 51) Lancaster, New Brunswick
- Party: Progressive Conservative Party of New Brunswick
- Spouse: Muriel Clarke Nicholl

Alphonso Colby Smith (March 4, 1894 – June 2, 1945) was a Canadian politician. He served in the Legislative Assembly of New Brunswick as member of the Progressive Conservative party from 1939 to 1945.

Alphonso Colby Smith was born on March 4, 1894 in Saint John, to Colby Smith and Marnie Gregory. He died at the age of 51 on June 2, 1945, at his home in Saint John West (Lancaster).
