= John Waterbury Cudlip =

Canadian politician

John Waterbury Cudlip (ca 1815 – November 22, 1885) was a merchant and politician in New Brunswick. He represented St. John County in the Legislative Assembly of New Brunswick from 1857 to 1866 and from 1868 to 1870.

== Life and career ==
=== 1815–1850s: Saint John positions ===
He was born in Saint John, New Brunswick, around 1815, the son of retired naval officer John Cudlip and Rebecca Waterbury. He went to school in Saint John, and possibly England as well.

As a teenager, he began work with Canadian businessman John Robertson, doing various positions. He became licensed as an auctioneer. In 1835, he was a militia officer in the Saint John City Light Infantry. He was made a freeman of Saint John in 1836. Cudlip was also commander of a volunteer fire brigade, which battled several fires in Saint John in the 1830s and 1840s. He was also active in the chamber of commerce and mechanics' institute.

In 1849, he was part of the Rail-Way League, and later that year, he was secretary of the organization's successor, the New Brunswick Colonial Association, which lobbied for a railway to be built from Saint John to Shediac. It also urged for reforms in government. By 1850, he had formed a business involved in exporting and wholesale with George E. Snyder.

=== 1852–1868: Political career ===
He was elected to the city council for Saint John in May 1852. As an organizer, in the 1854 election, he aided the election of Charles Fisher's Reform government. He ran unsuccessfully for a seat in the provincial assembly in 1854 and 1856. He was successful in 1857 as a Liberal.

In the 1860s, he became a leading critic of government policy, opposing the planned route for a railway to aid Saint John's trade, stating in 1963 "if the British Government want a Military Road, let them build it themselves."

He served as vice-consul for Sweden and Norway from 1864 to 1876. In the 1865 election, he received the most votes of candidates in teh province. He was named to the province's Executive Council in 1866 but defeated in the following general election. By 1868, his platform included a repeal of the British North America Act, and the annexation of New Brunswick to the United States. He was called "treasonable and disloyal" for the proposition, and his motion over New Brunswick was not permitted to be entered into the journal of the assembly, ending his political career.

=== 1869–1885: Business roles and customs ===
Even with his political career over, he remained popular in Saint John and continued to be active in business. In 1869, he was president of the chamber of commerce. In 1873, he was a director of the Maritime Bank of the Dominion of Canada.

In 1873, he was named customs inspector for New Brunswick and Prince Edward Island, and he served in that post until 1885.

== Personal life ==
He married Emily Allison in 1852. They went on to have seven children. He died on November 22, 1885, in Saint John from injuries sustained from a fire in his home.
