= James Quinton (politician) =

Canadian politician

MLA for St. John County
- In office 1866 to 1870

Personal details
- Born: May 5, 1821 Maugerville, New Brunswick
- Died: May 17, 1874 (aged 53) Lancaster, New Brunswick
- Children: William A. Quinton

James Quinton (May 5, 1821 – May 17, 1874) was a farmer, building contractor and political figure in New Brunswick. He represented St. John County in the Legislative Assembly of New Brunswick from 1866 to 1870.

Quinton supported union with Canada. He married Elizabeth Gove Tilley.

His son William A. Quinton also served in the New Brunswick assembly. He died in 1874.
