= Robert McAllister (politician) =

Canadian politician and businessman

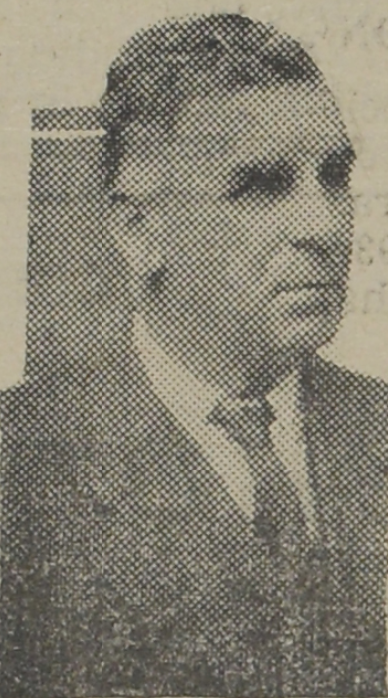
- McAllister, pictured in a 1935 newspaper

MLA for St. John County
- In office 1931 to 1960

Personal details
- Born: January 9, 1876 Saint John, New Brunswick
- Died: October 10, 1963 (aged 87) Saint John, New Brunswick
- Party: Conservative Party of New Brunswick

Robert McAllister (January 9, 1876 – October 10, 1963) was a businessman and politician in New Brunswick, Canada. He represented St. John County in the Legislative Assembly of New Brunswick as a Conservative member from 1931 to 1960.

== Early life ==
He was the son of James McAllister and Jessie Main, both of Scottish origin.

== Career ==
He was first elected to the provincial assembly in a 1931 by-election held after John M. Baxter was appointed a judge.

== Personal life ==
In 1902, McAllister married a Miss Humphrey. He was a dyer and cleaner. McAllister served as county warden. He was a member of the Knights of Pythias.

== Death ==
He died in 1963 of arteriosclerosis.
