= Silas Alward =

Canadian politician

Member of the Legislative Assembly of New Brunswick for City of St. John
- In office 1887–1899

Personal details
- Born: April 14, 1841 New Canaan, Queens County, New Brunswick, British North America
- Died: June 12, 1919 (aged 78)
- Party: Liberal

Silas Alward (April 14, 1841 – June 12, 1919) was a Canadian politician in the province of New Brunswick.

Born in New Canaan, Queens County, New Brunswick, the son of John Alward and Mary A. Corey, Alward received a Bachelor of Arts degree from Acadia College in Wolfville, Nova Scotia, in 1860. In 1871, he received an A.M. degree from Brown University in Providence, Rhode Island. He studied law in Saint John, New Brunswick, and was called to the bar of New Brunswick in 1866.

He was elected by acclamation to the Legislative Assembly of New Brunswick in 1887. A Liberal, he was re-elected in the 1890, 1892, and 1895 elections but was defeated in the 1899 election.
