= David Morrow (politician) =

Canadian politician

David Morrow (1831 – March 6, 1905) was a farmer and political figure in New Brunswick, Canada. He represented Sunbury County in the Legislative Assembly of New Brunswick from 1895 to 1899 as an independent Conservative member.

He was born in Burton, New Brunswick, the son of G.O. Morrow and Elizabeth Wood. Morrow was also involved in the lumber trade. He served as a member of the municipal council in Oromocto. Before being elected in 1895, he ran twice unsuccessfully for a seat in the provincial assembly.
