= Abner Reid McClelan =

Canadian politician (1831–1917)

The Honourable Abner Reid McClelan
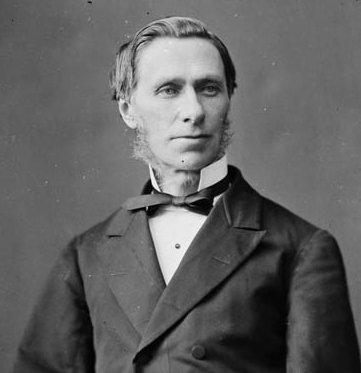
- McClelan in 1879

10th Lieutenant Governor of New Brunswick
- In office December 9, 1896 – January 21, 1902
- Monarchs: Victoria; Edward VII
- Governors General: The Earl of Aberdeen; The Earl of Minto
- Premier: James Mitchell; Henry Emmerson; Lemuel J. Tweedie
- Preceded by: John James Fraser
- Succeeded by: Jabez Bunting Snowball

Senator for New Brunswick, New Brunswick
- In office 1867–1896
- Nominated by: John A. Macdonald
- Appointed by: Royal Proclamation

Personal details
- Born: January 4, 1831 Riverside-Albert, New Brunswick
- Died: January 30, 1917 (aged 86) Moncton, New Brunswick, Canada
- Party: Liberal
- Spouse: Anna Reid (m. 1876)

Abner Reid McClelan (January 4, 1831 – January 30, 1917) was a Canadian senator and the tenth Lieutenant Governor of New Brunswick.

Born in Riverside-Albert, New Brunswick, the son of Peter McClelan and Lucy (Robinson) McLelan, he was educated at Mount Allison Wesleyan Academy in Sackville, (now Mount Allison University). He was elected to the Legislative Assembly of New Brunswick in 1854 and served until confederation in 1867 when he was called to the Senate of Canada for the senatorial division of New Brunswick. A Liberal, he resigned in 1896 when he was appointed Lieutenant Governor of New Brunswick. He served until 1902. McClelan died in Moncton, New Brunswick, in 1917.
