= Henry Emmerson =

Canadian politician (1853–1914)

The Honourable Henry Robert Emmerson PC
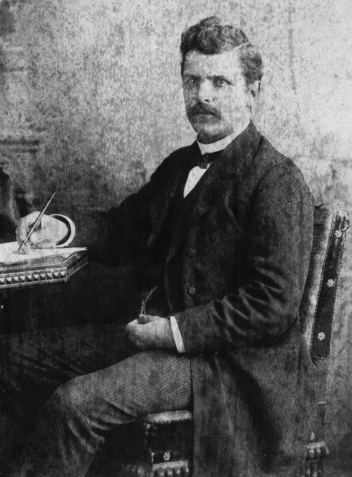
- H. R. Emerson, Premier of New Brunswick

9th Premier of New Brunswick
- In office October 29, 1897 – August 31, 1900
- Monarch: Victoria
- Lieutenant Governor: Abner Reid McClelan
- Preceded by: James Mitchell
- Succeeded by: Lemuel J. Tweedie

MLA for Albert
- In office September 28, 1888 – January 20, 1890 Serving with Gaius S. Turner
- Preceded by: W.J. Lewis
- Succeeded by: W.J. Lewis
- In office October 22, 1892 – August 31, 1900 Serving with W.J. Lewis, Charles J. Osman
- Preceded by: Gaius S. Turner
- Succeeded by: Sanford S. Ryan

Member of the Canadian Parliament for Westmorland
- In office November 7, 1900 – July 9, 1914
- Preceded by: Henry Absalom Powell
- Succeeded by: Arthur Bliss Copp

Personal details
- Born: September 25, 1853 Maugerville, New Brunswick, Canada
- Died: July 9, 1914 (aged 60) Dorchester, New Brunswick, Canada
- Party: Liberal
- Spouse: Emily Charlotte Record (m. 1878; died 1901)
- Children: Ethel Record Deacon, Henry Read Emmerson, Emily Keillor Cornell, Bernice Seaman McQueen, Marion Bennett Bowes
- Education: St. Joseph's College; Acadia College; Boston University
- Occupation: Lawyer, businessman and philanthropist
- Profession: Politician

Henry Robert Emmerson, PC (September 25, 1853 – July 9, 1914) was a Canadian lawyer, businessman, politician, and philanthropist who served as Premier of New Brunswick from 1897 to 1900.

Henry Emmerson was educated at Amherst Academy, Mount Allison Academy, St. Joseph's College, Acadia College and earned a law degree from Boston University. He went on to a lucrative law practice and was heavily involved in business. He was involved in woollen manufacturing, was a director of the Maritime Baptist Publishing Company Limited, president of the New Brunswick Petroleum Company Limited, the Acadia Coal and Coke Company, and the Sterling Coal Company, as well as a director of the Record Foundry and Machine Company.

He attempted to win a seat in the House of Commons of Canada in 1887 but was unsuccessful. The next year he was elected to the provincial legislature then after the win was contested by his opponent and a new election contest ordered in 1889, Emmerson won the seat. In 1891 he was appointed to the Legislative Council of the province and oversaw its abolition. He re-entered the House of Assembly and in October 1892 was appointed to the Executive Council, serving as Chief Commissioner of Public Works in the Liberal government of Premier Andrew George Blair.

As commissioner, Emmerson stopped the practice of building bridges out of wood and opted for more permanent, and more expensive, materials thus driving up the province's public debt. He also supported women's suffrage.

Emmerson became Premier in 1897. During his tenure, he briefly held the position of Attorney-General. His government tried to promote tourism and wheat farming and the development of natural gas and petroleum in the province. In 1899, he introduced legislation to grant women the right to vote but in a free vote, the bill was defeated.

Emmerson left provincial politics in 1900 to become a Liberal MP in the House of Commons of Canada. From 1904 to 1907 he was Minister of Railways and Canals in the federal cabinet of Sir Wilfrid Laurier.

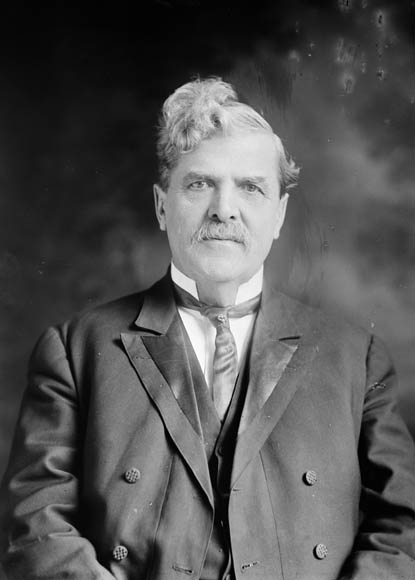
Portrait from March 1912

Although he was regarded as brilliant, capable, and personable, his alcoholism and reputation as a womanizer hampered his career. In 1906, an exasperated Laurier had Emmerson sign a pledge that he would "never . . . again taste wine, beer or any other mixed or intoxicating liquor" and that he would provide the prime minister with an undated and signed letter of resignation to be used should he fail in his promise. The letter of resignation was invoked in 1907 after The Daily Gleaner newspaper reported that Emmerson was thrown out of a Montreal hotel with "two women of ill repute". He denied the allegations but on April 1 submitted his resignation from Cabinet, which Laurier accepted. Emmerson filed an unsuccessful lawsuit against the Daily Gleaner for defamation and libel.

Henry Emerson remained a member of parliament for another seven years until his death in 1914. In his later years, Emmerson donated the money to build a new library, named Emmerson Hall, at Acadia University in honour of his father, Robert Henry Emmerson.

== Personal life ==
Emmerson was interred at Moncton's Elmwood Cemetery. His son, Henry Read Emmerson, was also elected to the Canadian House of Commons and was appointed to the Senate of Canada. His great great grandson was Chris Cornell, lead singer of Soundgarden. His great great great grandson is professional ice hockey player Noah Dobson.

== Electoral record ==
1891 Canadian federal election: Westmoreland
Party	Candidate	Votes	%	±%
Conservative	Josiah Wood	4,205	67.2	+12.7
Liberal	William F. George	2,057	32.8	-12.7

1891 Canadian federal election: Albert
Party	Candidate	Votes	%	±%
Conservative	Richard Chapman Weldon	1,096	51.80	-1.35
Liberal	Henry Emmerson	1,020	48.20	+1.35
Total valid votes		2,116	–	
Source: Library of Parliament

1900 Canadian federal election: Westmoreland
Party	Candidate	Votes	%	±%
Liberal	Henry Emmerson	4,420	52.9	+3.0
Conservative	Henry A. Powell	3,934	47.1	-3.0

By-election: on Mr. Emmerson being appointed Minister of Railways and Canals:

By-election on 30 January 1904
Party	Candidate	Votes
Liberal	Henry Emmerson	acclaimed

1904 Canadian federal election: Westmoreland
Party	Candidate	Votes	%	±%
Liberal	Henry Emmerson	4,693	55.6	+2.7
Conservative	Henry A. Powell	3,747	44.4	-2.7

1908 Canadian federal election: Westmoreland
Party	Candidate	Votes	%	±%
Liberal	Henry Emmerson	5,047	58.0	+2.4
Conservative	Frederick William Sumner	3,662	42.0	-2.4

1911 Canadian federal election: Westmoreland
Party	Candidate	Votes	%	±%
Liberal	Henry Emmerson	4,452	50.4	-7.6
Unknown	Medley Godfrey Siddall	4,388	49.6	+7.6
