= 1892 New Brunswick general election =

Canadian provincial election

The 1892 New Brunswick general election was held in October 1892, to elect 41 members to the 28th New Brunswick Legislative Assembly, the governing house of the province of New Brunswick, Canada. The election was held before the adoption of party labels.

There were a number of issues that led to dissatisfaction with the government among certain groups of voters in the province:

- in Bathurst, the Protestant minority felt that they were being overly taxed to support the operation of separate schools
- temperance societies did not support the government because it was opposed to prohibition
- some farmers were dissatisfied with the government's agricultural policy

However, the opposition was not able to organize an effective campaign to consolidate the support of factions opposed to the government.

The opposition had their best results in York County, where all the government candidates were defeated, and St. John County. A.G. Blair, the government leader, was defeated in York and was forced to run in a by-election held in Queen's.

Of forty-one MLAs, twenty-five supported the government, twelve formed the opposition, and the other four were neutral.

The province's Legislative Council had been abolished by legislation passed in 1891; that legislation now came into effect.

New Brunswick general election, 1892
Party	Leader	Seats
Government (Liberal)	Andrew George Blair	25
Opposition (Conservative)	Alfred Augustus Stockton	12
Neutral		4
