= Edmund William George =

Canadian politician

Member of Parliament for Westmorland
- In office June 1949 – June 1953

Personal details
- Born: Edmund William George; 14 March 1908
- Died: 27 September 1963 (aged 55)
- Party: Liberal
- Spouse(s): M. Phyllis Davison m 30 June 1931
- Profession: farmer

Edmund William George (14 March 1908 – 27 September 1963) was a Canadian politician, farmer and soldier. George served as a Liberal party member of the House of Commons of Canada.

George became a farmer by career, following graduation from Mount Allison University with a Bachelor of Arts in 1929. He served with the military in World War II with postings in North Africa and Europe.

He was first elected to Parliament at the Westmorland riding in the 1949 general election. After completing his only federal term, the 21st Canadian Parliament, George left the House of Commons and did not stand for re-election in the 1953 election.

1949 Canadian federal election: Westmoreland
Party	Candidate	Votes	%	±%
Liberal	Edmund William George	20,649	57.3	+4.3
Progressive Conservative	John Edward Murphy	11,696	32.4	-3.3
Co-operative Commonwealth	William Robert Rogers	3,702	10.3	-1.1
