= Charles J. Osman =

Canadian politician

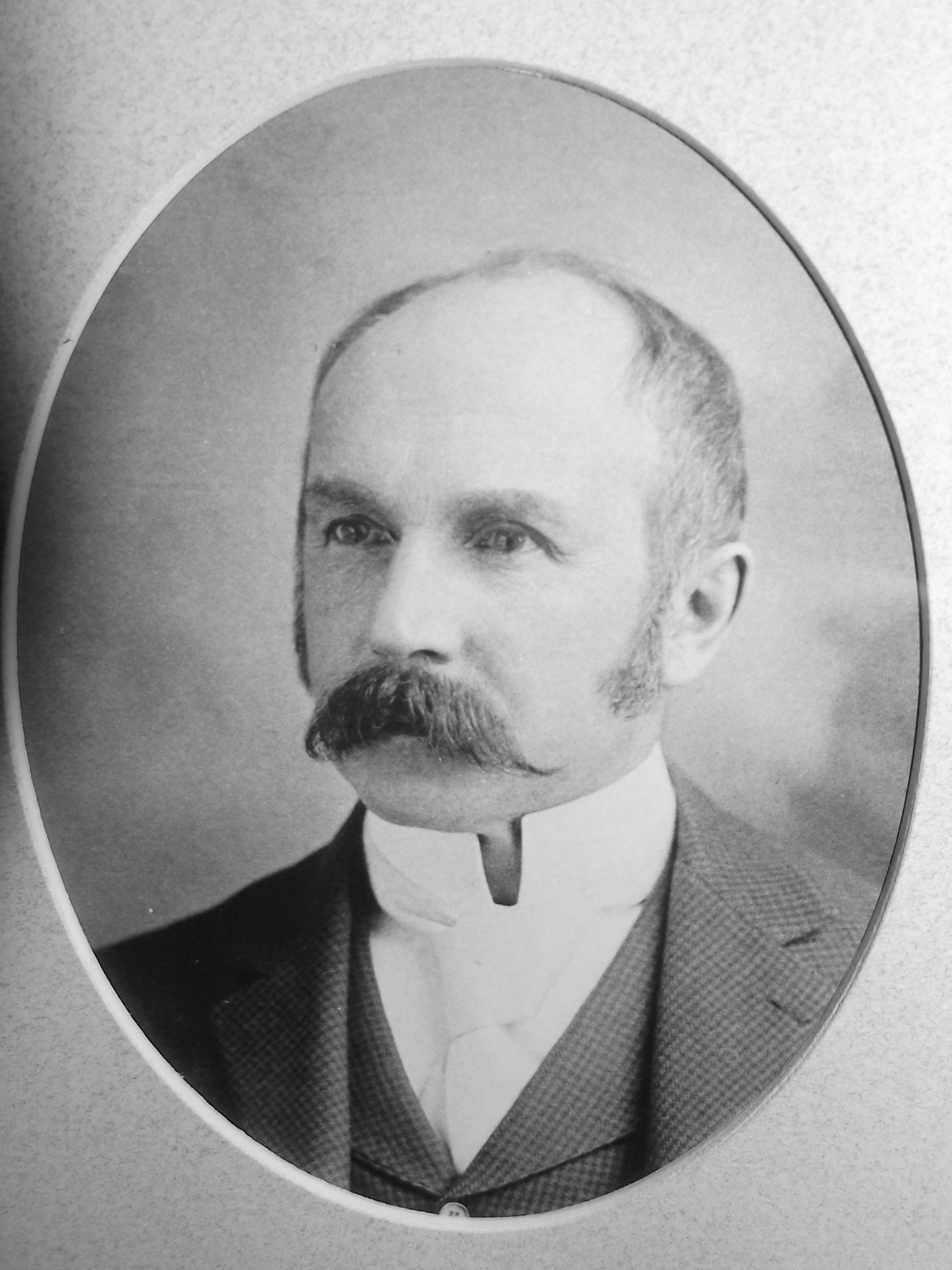
Charles Joseph Osman

Charles Joseph Osman (April 15, 1851 – April 13, 1922) was a businessman and political figure in New Brunswick, Canada. He represented Albert County in the Legislative Assembly of New Brunswick from 1897 to 1908 as a Liberal member.

Osman was born in London, England, was educated in Hertfordshire and later emigrated to New Brunswick. Osman married Laura E. Tomkins. He was the manager of a plaster mill and quarries at Hillsborough. He was first elected in an 1897 by-election held after William James Lewis was elected to the House of Commons of Canada. Osman served as speaker from 1907 to 1908.

Political offices
Preceded by Clifford William Robinson	Speaker of the Legislative Assembly of New Brunswick; 1907-1908	Succeeded by Donald Morrison
