= William T. Howe =

Canadian politician

William Thomas Howe (18 June 1835 – April 1918) was a farmer and political figure in New Brunswick, Canada. He represented York County in the Legislative Assembly of New Brunswick from 1892 to 1899 as a Conservative member.

He was born in Fredericton, New Brunswick, the son of Thomas William Howe and Esther Emaa Sutherland. In 1862 he married Mary Ann Donald (1830–1917). Howe was a major in the local militia and was a member of the Fredericton City Council, also serving as county warden. He died and was buried in Stanley, New Brunswick.
