= William Murray (New Brunswick politician) =

Canadian politician

William Murray (February 13, 1857 – March 27, 1913) was a lawyer and political figure in New Brunswick, Canada. He represented Restigouche County in the Legislative Assembly of New Brunswick from 1885 to 1892 as a Liberal-Conservative.

He was born in Cambellton, Colony of New Brunswick. His father had gone there from Prince Edward Island. In 1883, he married Gertrude M. Barberie (1867–1948). He was first elected to the provincial assembly in an 1885 by-election held after J.C. Barberie was named to the province's Legislative Council. Murray also served on the county council.

He died on March 27, 1913.
