= Herman Pitts =

Canadian politician

Herman H. Pitts (July 16, 1858 – March 8, 1923) was a journalist and political figure in New Brunswick, Canada. He represented York County in the Legislative Assembly of New Brunswick from 1892 to 1899 as a Conservative member.

He was born in Oromocto, New Brunswick the grandson of Henry Wood(s) Pitts, designer of King's Square and merchant of Saint John, New Brunswick. His ancestors were United Empire Loyalists on both parents sides. He was educated at The Fredericton Collegiate School, Fredericton. In 1884, he married a Miss Lilly Stirling Alexandrina McLeod. Pitts was owner and editor of the New Brunswick Reporter. He was Imperial Grand Secretary of the Triennial Council of the Orange Order. He founded The People's Gas Supply Company of Ottawa Carbide Company and Pitts Construction Company. He was a Director of The Toronto Power Company, The Toronto Electric Company, and the Electric Development Company and the Toronto Street Railway. He was also a member of the Sons of Temperance and a Grand Master in the Orange Lodge. He died in Ottawa on March 8, 1923.
