= John Berryman (politician) =

Canadian politician

John Berryman (December 9, 1828 – November 14, 1900) was a physician and political figure in New Brunswick, Canada. He represented the city of Saint John in the Legislative Assembly of New Brunswick from 1886 to 1890 as a Liberal member.

He was born in Saint John, New Brunswick, the son of John Berryman, an Irish immigrant, and a Miss Wade, of United Empire Loyalist descent. He studied medicine at the University of Edinburgh and, after receiving his M.D., was assistant of a professor there for two years. Berryman served as a surgeon in the Union army during the American Civil War from 1862 to 1863. In 1864, he married Mary Annie Brodie. He set up practice in Saint John. Berryman served as surgeon for the local militia from 1864 to 1875 and for the police from 1863 to 1875.
