= Thomas Colter =

Canadian politician

Thomas Henry Colter (November 24, 1849 — December 26, 1923) was a farmer and political figure in New Brunswick, Canada. He represented York County in the Legislative Assembly of New Brunswick from 1890 to 1892 as a Conservative member.

He was born in Sheffield, New Brunswick, the son of Irish immigrants. He was educated in York County and in Fredericton. Colter served on the county council and was warden for two years. He was elected in a by-election held in October 1890.
