= John Sievewright =

Canadian politician

John Sievewright (1846 — ca. February 1898) was a teacher and political figure in New Brunswick, Canada. He represented Gloucester County in the Legislative Assembly of New Brunswick from 1892 to his death in 1898 as an Independent member.

He was born in Newcastle, New Brunswick, the son of John Sievewright. He was educated at the University of New Brunswick. He was principal of a high school in Sydney, Nova Scotia and of a seminary in Newcastle. He served as secretary for the school board and then secretary-treasurer for the county. Sievewright ran unsuccessfully for a seat in the provincial assembly in 1878.
