= L. Murray Curren =

Canadian politician

Member of the Legislative Assembly of New Brunswick
- In office 1921–1925
- Constituency: Saint John County

Personal details
- Born: December 16, 1873 Highfield, New Brunswick
- Died: December 11, 1945 (aged 71) Boston, Massachusetts, U.S.
- Party: New Brunswick Liberal Association
- Spouse: Mabel Virtue
- Children: five
- Occupation: surgeon

Levi Murray Curren (December 16, 1873 – December 11, 1945) was a Canadian politician. He served in the Legislative Assembly of New Brunswick as a member of the Liberal party, representing Saint John County.
