= Walter Powers (politician) =

Canadian politician

Walter Vincent Powers (July 24, 1895 – November 8, 1954) was an accountant and political figure in New Brunswick, Canada. He represented Victoria County in the Legislative Assembly of New Brunswick from 1953 to 1954 as a Progressive Conservative member.

He was born in Fredericton, New Brunswick, the son of Thomas Powers and Bridget Burke. In 1918, he married Irene McLaughlin. Powers was clerk-treasurer for the town of Grand Falls from 1916 to 1936. He was an unsuccessful candidate for a seat in the provincial assembly in 1939, 1944 and 1948. Powers was named speaker for the provincial assembly in 1954 following the death of E.T. Kennedy but died in office before completing his term.
