= James Rourke =

Canadian politician

James Rourke (June 27, 1838 – March 3, 1914) was a lumber manufacturer and political figure in New Brunswick, Canada. He represented St. John County in the Legislative Assembly of New Brunswick from 1890 to 1892 as a Liberal-Conservative. He was born in Musquash, New Brunswick. In 1871, he married Charlotte Wishart. Rourke was a captain of the Saint Martin’s Rifle Company and served on the council for Saint John. He ran unsuccessfully for a seat in the provincial assembly in 1888.
