= Richard Tibbits =

Canadian politician

Member of the Legislative Assembly of New Brunswick
- In office 1883–1884
- Constituency: Victoria

Personal details
- Born: Richard White Longmuir Tibbits; 1846 Quebec, British North America
- Died: 1924 (aged 77–78)
- Party: Conservative
- Spouse: Sarah A. Clark (m. 1874)
- Parent: James Tibbits
- Occupation: Insurance agent; Justice of the peace; politician

Richard White Longmuir Tibbits (1846–1924) was an insurance agent and political figure in New Brunswick, Canada. He represented Victoria County in the Legislative Assembly of New Brunswick from 1883 to 1884 as a Conservative member.

He was born in Quebec, the son of James Tibbits, who also served in the New Brunswick assembly. He was educated at Lennoxville College. In 1874, he married Sarah A. Clark. Tibbits was also a justice of the peace and secretary-treasurer for the county. He lived in Andover.
