= George L. Taylor =

Canadian politician (1842–1897)

George L. Taylor (1842 – May 31, 1897) was a physician and political figure in New Brunswick, Canada. He represented King's County in the Legislative Assembly of New Brunswick from 1886 to 1892 as a Conservative member.

He was born in Saint John, New Brunswick, the son of George Taylor, a merchant. Taylor was educated in Saint John and at Sackville Academy. He studied medicine at Bellevue Hospital Medical College in New York City, receiving his M.D. in 1863. He served on the council for King's County and was warden in 1879.

Taylor died in Hampton on May 31, 1897.
