= Adam Beveridge =

Canadian politician

Adam J. Beveridge (December 28, 1826 – September 29, 1907) was a Scottish-born lumber merchant and political figure in New Brunswick, Canada. He represented Victoria County in the Legislative Assembly of New Brunswick from 1895 to 1899 as a Liberal member.

He was born in Kinross-shire, the son of William Beveridge, and came to Canada with his stepbrother Benjamin at the age of 15. Beveridge settled in Andover and served on the municipal council. He married Hannah Britt. Beveridge was a census taker for the 1851 New Brunswick Census.
