= William A. Quinton =

Canadian politician

MLA for St. John County
- In office 1883 to 1890

Personal details
- Born: April 4, 1845 Lancaster, New Brunswick
- Died: February 7, 1927 (aged 81) St. John County, New Brunswick
- Party: Liberal Party of New Brunswick

William Alfred Quinton (April 4, 1845 – February 7, 1927) was a farmer and political figure in New Brunswick, Canada. He represented St. John County in the Legislative Assembly of New Brunswick from 1883 to 1890 as a Liberal member.

He was born in Lancaster, New Brunswick, the son of James Quinton and Elizabeth Tilley, and was educated in Saint John. Quinton served on the municipal council and was a major in the militia. He was also involved in lumbering. In 1877, he married Kate Allan.

He died February 7, 1927.
