= John McLeod (New Brunswick politician) =

Canadian politician

Member of the Legislative Assembly of New Brunswick
- In office 1892 – November 26, 1901 Serving with Albert T. Dunn
- Constituency: Saint John County

Personal details
- Born: March 14, 1825 Greenock, Scotland
- Died: November 26, 1901 (aged 76) Black River, New Brunswick
- Party: New Brunswick Liberal Association
- Spouse: Mary Alward
- Occupation: shipbuilder

John McLeod (March 14, 1825 – November 26, 1901) was a Scottish-born ship builder and political figure in New Brunswick, Canada.

McLeod represented St. John County in the Legislative Assembly of New Brunswick from 1892 to 1901 as a Liberal. He served twenty years as a member of the council for St. John.

He was born in Greenock and came to Canada with his family in 1826. McLeod traveled at sea for several years and worked in the gold fields of Australia from 1852 to 1857. He married Mary Alward. McLeod began building ships in 1862 at Black River. He died on November 26, 1901, while still in office.
