= 1890 New Brunswick general election =

Canadian provincial election

The 1890 New Brunswick general election was held on 20 January 1890, to elect 41 members to the 27th New Brunswick Legislative Assembly, the governing house of the province of New Brunswick, Canada. The election was held before the adoption of party labels.

The government of Andrew George Blair was able to remain in power with the support of Independent MLAs. Of forty-one MLAs, twenty-six supported the government, and fifteen formed the opposition.

New Brunswick general election, 1890
Party	Leader	Seats
Government (Liberal)	Andrew George Blair	26
Opposition (Conservative)	Daniel L. Hanington	15
