= David R. Moore =

Canadian politician

David Richard Moore (August 28, 1856 – May 16, 1926) was a physician and political figure in New Brunswick, Canada. He represented York County in the Legislative Assembly of New Brunswick from 1886 to 1890 as a Liberal member.

He was born in Galt, Ontario, the son of Scottish immigrants, and came to Stanley, New Brunswick with his parents. He studied at Harvard Medical College and the University of Vermont. He married Susannah Samson and then married Dora McBean after his first wife died in 1883. Moore was coroner for the county and a surgeon in the militia.
