= Albert Palmer (Canadian politician) =

Canadian politician

Albert Palmer was a trader and a politician in New Brunswick, Canada. As a member of the Liberal Party of New Brunswick, he represented Queen's County in the Legislative Assembly of New Brunswick from 1882 to 1892 as an Honorary Member of the Provincial Parliament (MPP). He later was elected as the deputy speaker for the Provincial Parliament of New Brunswick.

== Early life ==
Palmer was born in Hampstead, New Brunswick and was educated there. In 1868, he married Sheloa A. Durgan. He first served as warden for the Queen's County prior to starting his political career.
