= William Douglas (Canadian politician) =

Canadian politician

William Douglas was a farmer, lumber merchant and political figure in New Brunswick, Canada. He represented Charlotte County in the Legislative Assembly of New Brunswick from 1886 to 1892 as a Conservative member.

He was born in Saint Andrews, New Brunswick and educated in Saint Stephen. In 1865, he married Sarah Eldridge. Douglas ran unsuccessfully for a seat in the provincial assembly in 1882. He served ten years as county councillor.
