= George F. Hibbard =

Canadian politician

George Francis Hibbard (April 17, 1848 – January 8, 1934) was a merchant and political figure in New Brunswick, Canada. He represented Charlotte County in the Legislative Assembly of New Brunswick from 1882 to 1892 as an Independent member.

He was born in St. George, New Brunswick, the son of Francis Hibbard. In 1848, he married Julia Etta Breed. He served on the council for Charlotte County for two years. After Hibbard retired from politics, he became registrar of deeds and wills for Charlotte County
