= Thomas Hetherington (politician) =

Canadian politician (1815–1913)

MLA for Queen's County
- In office 1882 to 1892

Personal details
- Born: August 10, 1815 Johnston Parish, New Brunswick
- Died: September 3, 1913 (aged 98) Cody, New Brunswick
- Party: Liberal Party of New Brunswick

Thomas Thorne Hetherington (August 10, 1815 – September 3, 1913) was a merchant, farmer and political figure in New Brunswick, Canada. He represented Queen's County in the Legislative Assembly of New Brunswick from 1882 to 1892 as a Liberal member.

He was born in Johnston, Queen's County, New Brunswick, the son of Richard Hetherington, who came from England. In 1860, he married Violet D. Thorne. Hetherington was a justice of the peace and a commissioner in the Parish Court. He was reelected in Queen's in 1892 but resigned his seat to allow Andrew George Blair to be elected there in a by-election.

His son Judson also served as a member of the provincial assembly, also serving as speaker. He died in 1913.
