= James O'Brien (New Brunswick politician) =

Canadian politician (1834–1922)

James O'Brien (November 26, 1834 – July 2, 1922) was a blacksmith and political figure in New Brunswick, Canada. He represented Charlotte County in the Legislative Assembly of New Brunswick from 1892 to 1903 as a Liberal member.

He was born in Windsor, Nova Scotia, the son of John O'Brien, an Irish immigrant, and Susan Sivewright, of Huguenot descent. O'Brien married Statira E. Nutter. He served as Scott Act inspector for the county. O'Brien lived in Saint George, New Brunswick.
