= 1895 New Brunswick general election =

Canadian provincial election

The 1895 New Brunswick general election was held in October 1895, to elect 46 members to the 29th New Brunswick Legislative Assembly, the governing house of the province of New Brunswick, Canada. The government of Andrew George Blair was re-elected.

The election was held before the adoption of party labels. Codewords were ministerialist or anti-ministerialist, and Government or opposition.

Of forty-six MLAs, thirty-four supported the government, nine formed the opposition, and the other three were neutral. Among the opposition ranks were two Patrons of Industry MLAs, representing the organized farmers movement.

New Brunswick general election, 1895
| Party | Leader | Seats |
|---|---|---|
| Government (Liberal) | Andrew George Blair | 34 |
| Opposition (Conservative) | Alfred Augustus Stockton | 9 |
| Neutral | | 3 |
