= John O'Brien (Canadian politician) =

Canadian politician

Member of the Legislative Assembly of New Brunswick for Northumberland County
- In office 1890–1903

Personal details
- Born: February 20, 1847 Nelson-Miramichi, New Brunswick
- Died: October 20, 1917 (aged 70)
- Party: Liberal-Conservative

John O'Brien (February 20, 1847 – October 20, 1917) was a Canadian merchant and politician in New Brunswick, Canada. He represented Northumberland County in the Legislative Assembly of New Brunswick from 1890 to 1903 as a Liberal-Conservative.

He was born in Nelson-Miramichi, New Brunswick, the son of John O'Brien and Mary Alward, both Irish immigrants, and was educated there. In 1890, he married Lillie McPeake. O'Brien was involved in the lumber trade. He served on the county council and was county warden. O'Brien also served as vice-president of the local Agricultural Society.
