= Legislative Council of New Brunswick =

Former upper house of New Brunswick Legislature

Type
- Type: Upper house of the New Brunswick Legislature

History
- Founded: 1785
- Disbanded: 1891
- Preceded by: Nova Scotia Council
- Succeeded by: none

The Legislative Council of New Brunswick was the upper house of the government of the British colony and later Canadian province of New Brunswick between 1785 and 1891.

Members were appointed by the New Brunswick governor.

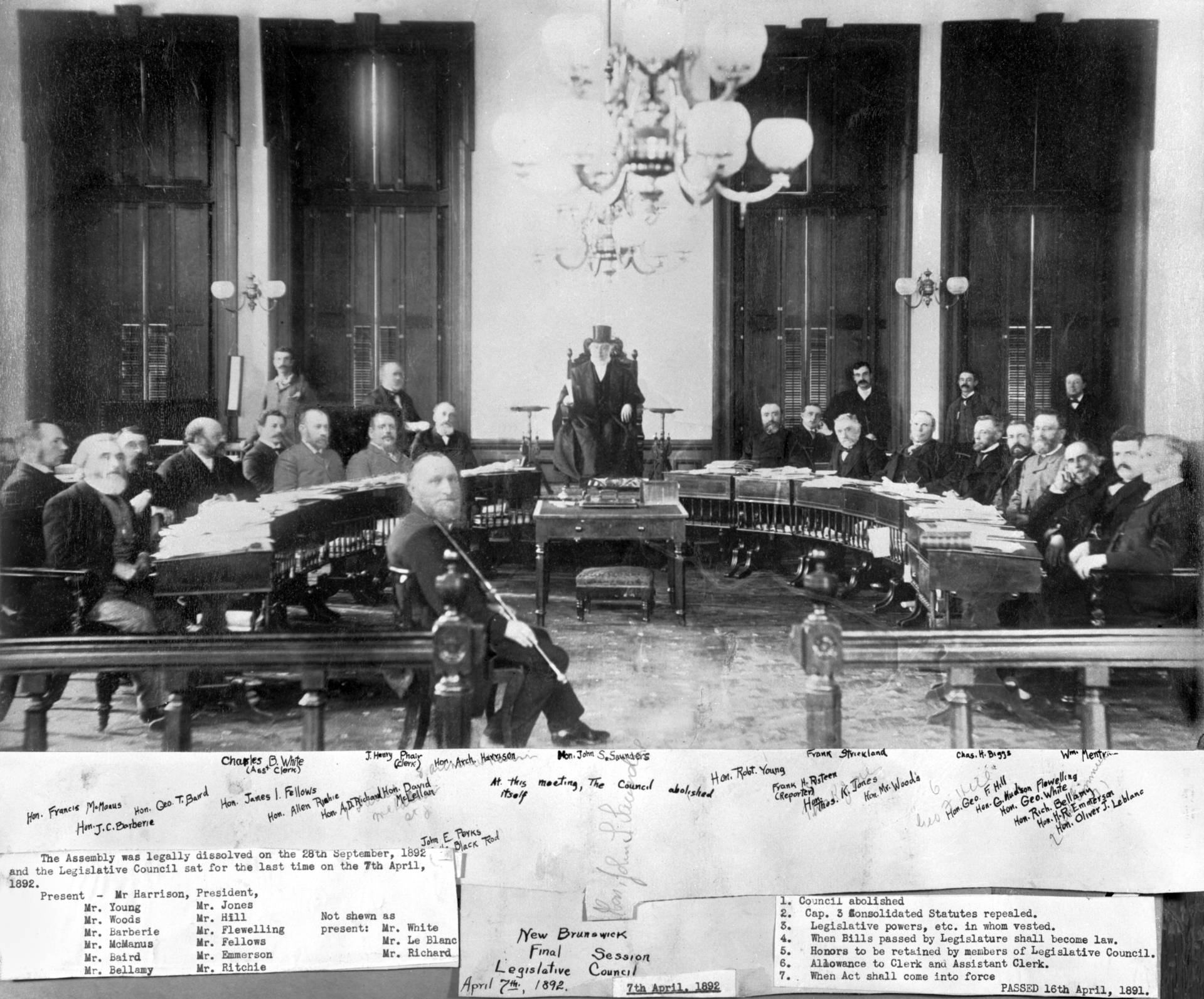
Photograph of the final session of the Legislative Council of New Brunswick

== Council chambers ==
The former chambers of the council are now used for committee meetings by the legislative assembly.

== Members ==
- Amos Edwin Botsford
- John James Robinson, 1856+
- Hugh Johnson
- William Crane
- Edwin Arnold Vail
- George Thomas Baird, 1891-1892
- James I. Follows, -1892
- David McLellan, -1892
- A. D. Richad, -1892
- Charles B. White, -1892
- John S. Saunders, -1892
- Robert Young, -1892
- Frank Strickland, -1892
- Thomas K. Jones, -1892
- Charles H. Biggs, -1892
- George F. Hill, -1892
- G. Hudson Flewelling, -1892
- George L. White, -1892
- Richard Bellamy, -1892
- Oliver J. Leblanc, -1892
- H. R. Emmerson, -1892
