= William Shaw (New Brunswick politician) =

Canadian politician

William Shaw (September 19, 1839 – March 3, 1922) was a farmer, baker and political figure in New Brunswick, Canada. In the Legislative Assembly of New Brunswick, he represented Saint John County & City from 1890 to 1892 and Saint John City from 1892 to 1903 as a Liberal-Conservative member.

He was born in Simonds parish, Saint John County, New Brunswick, of Irish descent, and was educated there. Shaw married Isabella Wooten. He served as alderman for Saint John and as chairman of the Public Works department. He died in 1922 at Saint John.
