= James Porter (New Brunswick politician) =

Canadian politician

MLA for Victoria County
- In office 1889 to 1892; 1896 to 1903

Personal details
- Born: November 6, 1846 New Brunswick, British North America
- Died: September 12, 1926 (aged 79) Andover, New Brunswick
- Party: Liberal Party of New Brunswick

James E. Porter (November 6, 1846 – September 12, 1926) was a farmer, miller and political figure in New Brunswick, Canada. He represented Victoria County in the Legislative Assembly of New Brunswick from 1889 to 1892 and from 1896 to 1903 as a Liberal member.

He was the son of John Porter, an early settler on the Upper Saint John River, and was educated at Presque Isle, Maine. Porter married Alma J. Watson. He served on the municipal council for 24 years and as county warden for 10 years. He ran unsuccessfully for a seat in the provincial assembly in the 1882, 1886 and 1890 general elections and was finally elected in a by-election held on August 23, 1890. He did not run in the 1892 general election but returned and won in the 1896 and 1899 general elections, but was defeated in the 1903 general election.

He died in Andover, New Brunswick in 1926.
