= Richard Bellamy (politician) =

Canadian politician

Richard Bellamy (1825 – November 29, 1892) was a farmer, land surveyor and politician in New Brunswick, Canada. He represented York County in the Legislative Assembly of New Brunswick from 1886 to 1890 as a Liberal member.

He was born in London, England and educated there. Bellamy came to New Brunswick as a "Blue Coat Boy", a juvenile emigrant. Later, he was also involved in the lumber trade. His reelection in 1890 was appealed and he lost the subsequent by-election. In 1891, Bellmay was named to the province's Executive Council. He died in office the following year.
