= Charles B. Harrison =

Canadian politician

Charles Burpee Harrison

MLA for Sunbury County
- In office 1886 to 1899

Personal details
- Born: May 13, 1824 Canning, New Brunswick
- Died: October 5, 1901 (aged 77) Maugerville, New Brunswick
- Party: Liberal Party of New Brunswick

Charles Burpee Harrison (May 13, 1824 – October 5, 1901) was a farmer and political figure in New Brunswick, Canada. He represented Sunbury County in the Legislative Assembly of New Brunswick from 1886 to 1899 as a Liberal member.

He was born in Canning, New Brunswick, the son of Charles Harrison, who served in the province's Legislative Council. Harrison married Charlotte Miles. He served on the county council.

His brother Archibald served in the provincial assembly and Legislative Council. He died in 1901.
