= James Russell (New Brunswick politician) =

Canadian politician

James Russell (November 15, 1824 – November 21, 1915) was a second generation farmer and respected political figure in New Brunswick, Canada. He represented Charlotte County in the Legislative Assembly of New Brunswick from 1886 to 1899, first as an independent and later as a Liberal member. Unsuccessful in his first attempt at a by-election on March 14, 1871, and defeated at the general election of 1882, he once again offered and was elected in 1886, and was subsequently returned to the Provincial Legislature in 1890, 1892, 1895, and again in 1899 and sat as a member until the dissolution of the house in 1903. He retired from political life at the age of seventy-nine and returned to Bayside, Charlotte County, NB.

He was born in Bayside, New Brunswick, of Scottish descent, and was educated there. His grandfather was one of many Castine Loyalists who received land grants in 1783. In 1851, he married Agnes McDouall, the daughter of Alexander McDouall and Margaret Cumming McDouall of High Curghie, Scotland. They had two sons: James Alexander Russell and John McDouall Russell. Russell was a magistrate and a member of the council for Charlotte County, serving two terms as county warden.

James Russell died on November 21, 1915, in Bayside, New Brunswick, and is buried at the Sandy Point Cemetery there.
