= Andrew George Blair =

Canadian politician

The Honourable Andrew George Blair PC KC
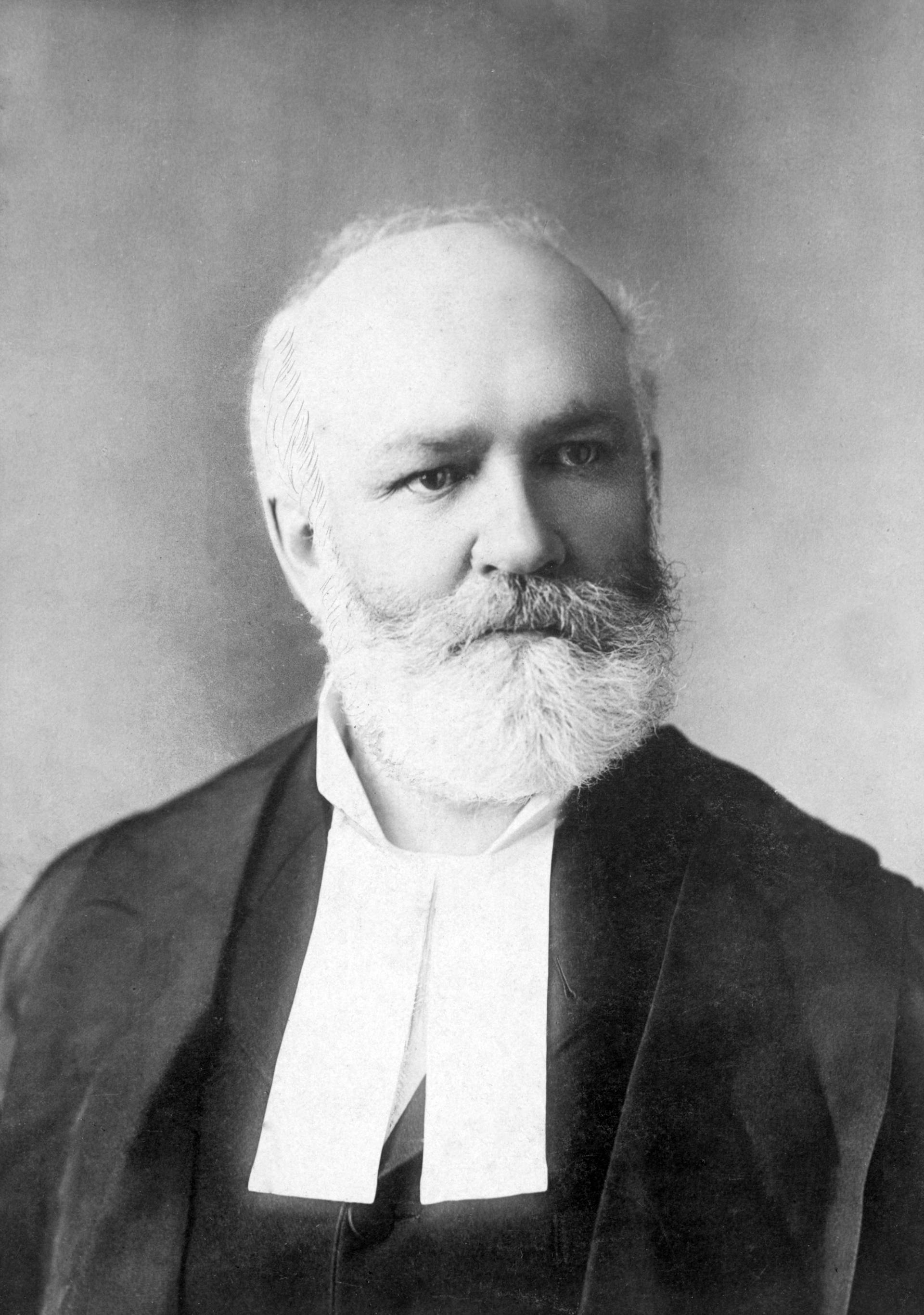
- Blair, photographed between 1883 – 1903

7th Premier of New Brunswick
- In office March 3, 1883 – July 17, 1896
- Monarch: Victoria
- Lieutenant Governor: Robert Duncan Wilmot; Samuel Leonard Tilley; John Boyd; John James Fraser
- Preceded by: Daniel L. Hanington
- Succeeded by: James Mitchell

MLA for York
- In office June 25, 1878 – October 22, 1892 Serving with John James Fraser, Edward Ludlow Wetmore, Richard Bellamy, Thomas Colter, Frederick P. Thompson, William Wilson, George J. Colter, David R. Moore, John Anderson
- Preceded by: Robert Robinson
- Succeeded by: George W. Allen

MLA for Queens
- In office October 22, 1892 – July 17, 1896 Serving with Laughlin Farris
- Preceded by: Thomas Hetherington
- Succeeded by: Isaac W. Carpenter

Member of the Canadian Parliament for Sunbury—Queen's
- In office August 25, 1896 – November 7, 1900
- Preceded by: George Gerald King
- Succeeded by: Robert Duncan Wilmot, Jr.

Member of the Canadian Parliament for City of St. John
- In office November 7, 1900 – December 27, 1903
- Preceded by: John V. Ellis
- Succeeded by: John Waterhouse Daniel

Personal details
- Born: March 7, 1844 Fredericton, New Brunswick, Canada
- Died: January 25, 1907 (aged 62) Fredericton, New Brunswick, Canada
- Party: Liberal
- Spouse: Annie Elizabeth Thompson (m. 1866)
- Children: 2 sons and 5 daughters
- Relatives: Andrew Brewin (grandson)
- Education: Fredericton Collegiate School
- Occupation: Lawyer, lecturer
- Profession: politician

Andrew George Blair PC KC (March 7, 1844 – January 25, 1907) was a Canadian politician in New Brunswick, Canada. He served as the seventh premier of New Brunswick for 13 years and 136 days, the second-longest tenure in the province's history, behind Richard Hatfield's tenure of 16 years and 310 days.

He was first elected to the Legislative Assembly of New Brunswick in 1878 after unsuccessful attempts in the previous two elections. Though Blair was a supporter of Sir John A. Macdonald's federal Liberal-Conservatives, he joined the parliamentary opposition in the legislature and, in 1879, became leader of the opposition to the Conservative government of Premier John James Fraser. He molded the disparate opposition into the modern Liberal Party of New Brunswick, instituting party platforms or manifestos. He launched the first province-wide political campaign in an era when campaign had been run largely on a constituency basis. He took the party to power in 1883, winning enough support in the newly elected legislature to form a government. Blair became premier and Attorney-General.

Blair's government built a three-quarters of a mile long bridge across the Saint John River, linking Fredericton with villages and factories, notably that of Boss Gibson, on the other side of the river, in spite of opposition by the federal government, which maintained that it was beyond provincial power to do so. His government also went to court to win the right to grant liquor licenses. He also extended the franchise, which had been exclusively male, to widows and unmarried women who owned property. He was opposed, however, to universal female suffrage. His government also abolished the Legislative Council (the legislature's Upper House).

The Liberal government almost lost the 1889 election but was able to stay in power with the support of independent Members of the Legislative Assembly (MLAs). Blair lost his own seat in the 1892 election, due to Protestant opposition to his policy of accommodating Acadians and other Catholics. Blair had appointed several Acadians and other Catholics to his cabinet and other government positions. Blair was able to re-enter the house through a by-election.

After leading his party to a major electoral victory in 1895, Blair left provincial politics in 1896 when he was appointed Minister of Railways and Canals in the federal Cabinet of Liberal Prime Minister Wilfrid Laurier. He was sworn in as Minister of Railways and Canals on 13 July 1896, entered the House of Commons of Canada in an August 1896 by-election for Sunbury and Queens riding, and was re-elected in the 1900 election.

In December 1901, Blair's daughter Bessie drowned while skating on the ill-frozen Ottawa River at a party put on by the Governor-General; Henry Harper dove in to try to rescue her, but drowned as well. His actions are remembered by the statue on Parliament Hill to Sir Galahad.

Blair notified the government of his resignation on 13 July 1903; in his speech on 16 July he outlined his reasons for his opposition to Laurier's plan to build the Grand Trunk Pacific Railway. The official New Brunswick biography has the date of his resignation 20 July. He spoke about the reason for his resignation for five hours in the House of Commons on 11 August. He did not see why the government "should build and own the lean section . . . and provide a company with government credit to enable them to build and operate the fat section," and referred to discussions about the railway that Wilfrid Laurier had had with other ministers behind his back, although he was the Minister charged with the portfolio. He further stated that other Ministers had been allowed to discuss with Grand Trunk officers plans for the transcontinental without informing him.

In order to prevent him from becoming a major opposition figure, Laurier appointed Blair to head the Board of Railway Commissioners in December 1903, taking Blair out of active politics and out of the House of Commons. However, Blair resigned from the Board sixteen days before the 1904 election in order to campaign against Laurier. He withdrew from the campaign, however, after discussions with Laurier.

== Personal life and death ==
Blair died on January 25, 1907, of a heart attack during a dinner party in Fredericton, New Brunswick. He was buried in the Beechwood Cemetery in Ottawa, Ontario.

One of Blair's grandsons, Andrew Brewin, served as a member of Parliament for the New Democratic Party.
