= 2nd New Brunswick Legislature =

The 2nd New Brunswick Legislative Assembly represented New Brunswick between January 3, 1793, and 1795.

The assembly sat at the pleasure of the Governor of New Brunswick, Thomas Carleton. All sessions were held in Fredericton in a building rented for that purpose.

The speaker of the house was selected as Amos Botsford.

== Members ==
Electoral District	Name	First elected
Charlotte	Robert Pagan	1786
Charlotte	Daniel McMaster	1793
Charlotte	Hugh Mackay	1793
Charlotte	Peter Clinch	1786
Kings	John Coffin	1786
Kings	David Fanning	1791
Northumberland	Ward Chipman	1786
Northumberland	John Black	1793
Queens	James Peters	1793
Queens	John Yeamans	1786
Saint John	William Thomson	1793
Saint John	William Pagan	1786
Saint John	George Younghusband	1793
Saint John	Edward Sands	1793
Saint John	Bradford Gilbert	1793
Saint John	Elias Hardy	1786
Sunbury	John Agnew	1793
Sunbury	James Glenie	1789
Westmorland	Amos Botsford	1786
Westmorland	Thomas Chandler	1793
Westmorland	William Black	1793
Westmorland	Thomas Dixson	1793
York	Daniel Murray	1786
York	Archibald McLean	1793
York	Stair Agnew	1793
York	Jacob Ellegood	1793

Preceded by 1st New Brunswick Legislature	Legislative Assemblies of New Brunswick; 1793–1795	Succeeded by 3rd New Brunswick Legislature
