= Kings (New Brunswick provincial electoral district) =

Defunct provincial electoral district in New Brunswick, Canada

New Brunswick electoral district

Defunct provincial electoral district
- Legislature: Legislative Assembly of New Brunswick
- District created: 1785
- District abolished: 1973
- First contested: 1785
- Last contested: 1970

Kings was a provincial electoral district for the Legislative Assembly of New Brunswick, Canada. It used a bloc voting system to elect candidates. It was abolished with the 1973 electoral redistribution, when the province moved to single-member ridings.

== Members of the Legislative Assembly ==
Legislature	Years	Member	Party	Member	Party	Member	Party
1st	1786 – 1792	John Coffin	Ind.	Ebenezer Foster	Ind.		
2nd	1793 – 1795	John Coffin	Ind.	David Fanning	Ind.		
3rd	1795 – 1802	John Coffin	Ind.	David Fanning	Ind.		
4th	1802 – 1809	John Coffin	Ind.	George Leonard, Jr.	Ind.		
5th	1809	John Coffin	Ind.	George Pitfield	Ind.		
5th	1810 – 1816	Jasper Belding	Ind.	George Leonard, Jr.	Ind.		
6th	1817 – 1819	James Brittain	Ind.	David B. Wetmore	Ind.		
7th	1820	Samuel Freeze	Ind.	David B. Wetmore	Ind.		
8th	1821 – 1827	John C. Vail	Ind.	David B. Wetmore	Ind.		
9th	1827 – 1830	Samuel Freeze	Ind.	John Humbert	Ind.		
10th	1831 – 1834	John C. Vail	Ind.	John Humbert	Ind.		
11th	1835 – 1837	William McLeod	Ind.	Samuel Freeze	Ind.		
12th	1837 – 1842	William McLeod	Ind.	Samuel Freeze	Ind.		
13th	1843 – 1846	Sylvester Zobieski Earle, Sr.	Ind.	Samuel Freeze	Ind.		
14th	1847 – 1850	Sylvester Zobieski Earle, Sr.	Ind.	William McLeod	Ind.	John C. Vail	Ind.
15th	1851 – 1854	Matthew McLeod	Ind.	George Ryan	Ind.	Henry W. Purdy	Ind.
16th	1854 – 1856	Matthew McLeod	Ind.	George Ryan	Ind.	Henry W. Purdy	Ind.
17th	1856 – 1857	Sylvester Zobieski Earle, Sr.	Ind.	Hugh McMonagle	Ind.	Walter Scovil	Ind.
18th	1857 – 1861	Matthew McLeod	Ind.	Edwin Arnold Vail	Ind.	Walter Scovil	Ind.
19th	1862 – 1865	George Ryan	Ind.	Edwin Arnold Vail	Ind.	Walter Scovil	Ind.
20th	1865 – 1866	George Otty	Ind.	Edwin Arnold Vail	Ind.	Walter Scovil	Ind.
21st	1866 – 1870	George Ryan	Ind.	William P. Flewelling	Ind.	John Flewelling	Ind.
22nd	1870 – 1873	George Otty	Ind.	Edwin Arnold Vail	Ind.	John Herbert Crawford	Lib.
22nd	1873 – 1874	James William Nowlan	Lib.	Edwin Arnold Vail	Ind.	John Herbert Crawford	Lib.
23rd	1875 – 1878	John Flewelling	Ind.	Robert E. McLeod	Ind.	John Herbert Crawford	Lib.
24th	1879 – 1882	Finnemore E. Morton	Ind.	Edwin Arnold Vail	Ind.	John Herbert Crawford	Lib.
25th	1883	Finnemore E. Morton	Ind.	Edwin Arnold Vail	Ind.	John Herbert Crawford	Lib.
25th	1883 – 1885	Finnemore E. Morton	Ind.	Edwin Arnold Vail	Ind.	Gabriel Flewelling	Lib.-Con.
25th	1885 – 1886	Finnemore E. Morton	Ind.	William Pugsley	Lib.	Gabriel Flewelling	Lib.-Con.
26th	1886 – 1890	Albert Scott White	Lib.-Con.	William Pugsley	Lib.	George L. Taylor	Lib.-Con.
27th	1890 – 1892	Albert Scott White	Lib.-Con.	William Pugsley	Lib.	George L. Taylor	Lib.-Con.
28th	1892 – 1895	Albert Scott White	Lib.-Con.	George G. Scovil	Lib.	Gabriel Flewelling	Lib.-Con.
29th	1896 – 1899	Albert Scott White	Lib.-Con.	George G. Scovil	Lib.	George William Fowler	Lib.-Con.
30th	1899 – 1902	Albert Scott White	Lib.-Con.	George G. Scovil	Lib.	William Pugsley	Lib.
30th	1902 – 1903	Ora P. King	Ind.	George G. Scovil	Lib.	William Pugsley	Lib.
31st	1903 – 1908	Ora P. King	Ind.	George G. Scovil	Lib.	William Pugsley	Lib.
32nd	1908 – 1912	George Burpee Jones	Cons.	Frederick M. Sproule	Ind.	James Alexander Murray	Cons.
33rd	1912 – 1917	George Burpee Jones	Cons.	Hedley V. Dickson	Cons.	James Alexander Murray	Cons.
34th	1917 – 1920	George Burpee Jones	Cons.	Hedley V. Dickson	Cons.	James Alexander Murray	Cons.
35th	1921 – 1922	George Burpee Jones	Cons.	Hedley V. Dickson	Cons.	Ormond W. Wetmore	Lib.
35th	1922 – 1925	James D. McKenna	Lib.	Hedley V. Dickson	Cons.	Ormond W. Wetmore	Lib.
36th	1925 – 1930	Alfred Johnson Brooks	Cons.	Hedley V. Dickson	Cons.	J. W. Smith	Cons.
37th	1931 – 1935	Alfred Johnson Brooks	Cons.	Jack Fairweather	Cons.	J. W. Smith	Cons.
38th	1935 – 1939	Walter W. V. Foster	Lib.	Colin C. McDonald	Lib.	W. A. Jeffries	Lib.
39th	1939 – 1944	Elmore T. Kennedy	Cons.	Hugh Mackay	Cons.	Harry A. McMackin	Cons.
40th	1944 – 1948	Elmore T. Kennedy	PC	Hugh Mackay	PC	John Woods	PC
41st	1948 – 1952	Elmore T. Kennedy	PC	Hugh Mackay	PC	John Woods	PC
42nd	1952 – 1956	Elmore T. Kennedy	PC	Cyril Sherwood	PC	Gordon Fairweather	PC
43rd	1957 – 1960	Harry N. Jonah	PC	Cyril Sherwood	PC	Gordon Fairweather	PC
44th	1960 – 1962	Harry N. Jonah	PC	Cyril Sherwood	PC	Gordon Fairweather	PC
44th	1962 – 1963	John B. M. Baxter, Jr.	PC	Cyril Sherwood	PC	George E. Horton	PC
45th	1963 – 1967	John B. M. Baxter, Jr.	PC	Cyril Sherwood	PC	George E. Horton	PC
46th	1967 – 1970	John B. M. Baxter, Jr.	PC	Cyril Sherwood	PC	George E. Horton	PC
47th	1970 – 1974	John B. M. Baxter, Jr.	PC	Cyril Sherwood	PC	George E. Horton	PC
Riding dissolved into Kings Centre, Kings East and Kings West

== Election results ==
1970 New Brunswick general election
Party	Candidate	Votes	Elected
Progressive Conservative	John B. M. Baxter	7,995	✓
Progressive Conservative	C. B. Sherwood	7,695	✓
Progressive Conservative	George Horton	7,593	✓
Liberal	Ralph H. London	4,185	
Liberal	Edward W. B. McLean	4,079	
Liberal	Michael J. Leclair	3,885	
New Democratic	Allan Hermitage	740	

1967 New Brunswick general election
Party	Candidate	Votes	Elected
Progressive Conservative	Cyril Sherwood	7,485	✓
Progressive Conservative	John B. M. Baxter, Jr.	7,288	✓
Progressive Conservative	George E. Horton	7,162	✓
Liberal	? Alward	4,472	
Liberal	? Dearborn	4,435	
Liberal	? Nibbet	4,334	

== See also ==
- List of New Brunswick provincial electoral districts
- Canadian provincial electoral districts
