= 3rd New Brunswick Legislature =

The 3rd New Brunswick Legislative Assembly represented New Brunswick between February 9, 1796, and 1802.

The assembly sat at the pleasure of the Governor of New Brunswick Thomas Carleton. Construction of a building to house the assembly at Fredericton, Province Hall, began in 1799 and was completed in 1802.

Amos Botsford was chosen as speaker for the house.

== Members ==
Electoral District	Name	First elected / previously elected
Charlotte	Robert Pagan	1786
Charlotte	James Campbell	1786, 1795
Charlotte	David Owen	1795
Charlotte	David Mowatt	1795
Charlotte	Ninian Lindsay (1799)	1799
Kings	John Coffin	1786
Kings	David Fanning	1795
Kings	George Leonard (1801)	1801
Northumberland	James Fraser	1795
Northumberland	Samuel Lee	1795
Queens	James Peters	1793
Queens	John Yeamans	1786
Saint John City	George Younghusband	1793
Saint John City	Nathan Smith	1795
Saint John County	William Pagan	1786
Saint John County	Jonathan Bliss	1786, 1795
Saint John County	James Simonds	1795
Saint John County	Bradford Gilbert	1793
Sunbury	James Glenie	1789
Sunbury	Samuel Denny Street	1795
Westmorland	Amos Botsford	1786
Westmorland	Samuel Gay	1795
Westmorland	Ralph Siddall	1795
Westmorland	Thomas Dixson	1793
York	Daniel Murray	1786
York	Jacob Ellegood	1793
York	Archibald McLean	1793
York	James French (Note: unseated after an appeal)	1795
York	Stair Agnew (1796)	1796

== Notes ==
Preceded by 2nd New Brunswick Legislature	Legislative Assemblies of New Brunswick; 1795–1802	Succeeded by 4th New Brunswick Legislature
