= 4th New Brunswick Legislature =

The 4th New Brunswick Legislative Assembly represented New Brunswick between February 8, 1803, and 1809.

The assembly sat at the pleasure of the Governor of New Brunswick Thomas Carleton. Carleton left the province in 1805 and the colony was governed by a series of colonial administrators after his departure.

Amos Botsford was chosen as speaker for the house.

== Members ==
Electoral District	Name	First elected / previously elected
Charlotte	Robert Pagan	1786
Charlotte	Ninian Lindsay	1802
Charlotte	Hugh Mackay	1802
Charlotte	Joseph Porter	1802
Kings	John Coffin	1786
Kings	George Leonard	1801
Northumberland	James Fraser	1795
Northumberland	Alexander Taylor	1802
Queens	James Peters	1793
Queens	John Yeamans	1786
Saint John City	George Younghusband	1793
Saint John City	John Robinson	1802
Saint John County	William Pagan	1786
Saint John County	Bradford Gilbert	1793
Saint John County	Hugh Johnston	1802
Saint John County	Edward Sands (Note: election appealed)	1802
Saint John County	Munson Jarvis (1804)	1804
Sunbury	James Glenie	1789
Sunbury	Elijah Miles	1802
Westmorland	Amos Botsford	1786
Westmorland	Benjamin Wilson	1802
Westmorland	James Easterbrooks	1802
Westmorland	Hugh McMonagle	1802
Westmorland	Titus Knapp (1803)	1803
York	John Davison	1802
York	Archibald McLean	1793
York	Walter Price	1802
York	Stair Agnew	1796

== Notes ==
Preceded by 3rd New Brunswick Legislature	Legislative Assemblies of New Brunswick; 1802–1809	Succeeded by 5th New Brunswick Legislature
