= York (provincial electoral district, 1785–1974) =

Defunct provincial electoral district in New Brunswick, Canada

New Brunswick electoral district

Defunct provincial electoral district
- Legislature: Legislative Assembly of New Brunswick
- District created: 1785
- District abolished: 1973
- First contested: 1785
- Last contested: 1970

York was a provincial electoral district for the Legislative Assembly of New Brunswick, Canada. It used a bloc voting system to elect candidates. It was abolished with the 1973 electoral redistribution, when the province moved to single-member ridings.

== Members of the Legislative Assembly ==
| Legislature | Years | Member | Party | Member | Party | Member | Party | Member | Party |
|---|---|---|---|---|---|---|---|---|---|
| 1st | 1786 – 1792 | Daniel Murray | Ind. | Isaac Atwood | Ind. | Daniel Lyman | Ind. | Edward Stelle | Ind. |
| 2nd | 1793 – 1795 | Daniel Murray | Ind. | Archibald McLean | Ind. | Stair Agnew | Ind. | Jacob Ellegood | Ind. |
| 3rd | 1795 – 1796 | Daniel Murray | Ind. | Archibald McLean | Ind. | James French | Ind. | Jacob Ellegood | Ind. |
| 3rd | 1796 – 1802 | Daniel Murray | Ind. | Archibald McLean | Ind. | Stair Agnew | Ind. | Jacob Ellegood | Ind. |
| 4th | 1802 – 1809 | John Davison | Ind. | Archibald McLean | Ind. | Stair Agnew | Ind. | Walter Price | Ind. |
| 5th | 1809 – 1816 | Peter Fraser | Ind. | John Allen | Ind. | Stair Agnew | Ind. | Duncan McLeod | Ind. |
| 6th | 1817 – 1819 | Peter Fraser | Ind. | John Allen | Ind. | Stair Agnew | Ind. | John Dow | Ind. |
| 7th | 1820 | Peter Fraser | Ind. | John Allen | Ind. | Stair Agnew | Ind. | John Dow | Ind. |
| 8th | 1821 | Peter Fraser | Ind. | John Allen | Ind. | Stair Agnew | Ind. | John Dow | Ind. |
| 8th | 1822 – 1827 | Peter Fraser | Ind. | John Allen | Ind. | William Taylor | Ind. | John Dow | Ind. |
| 9th | 1827 – 1830 | Richard Ketchum | Ind. | John Allen | Ind. | William Taylor | Ind. | John Dow | Ind. |
| 10th | 1831 – 1832 | Jedediah Slason | Ind. | John Allen | Ind. | William Taylor | Ind. | John Dow | Ind. |
| 10th | 1832 – 1834 | Jedediah Slason | Ind. | John Allen | Ind. | William Taylor | Ind. | James Taylor | Ind. |
| 11th | 1835 – 1837 | Jedediah Slason | Ind. | John Allen | Ind. | Lemuel Allan Wilmot | Ref. | James Taylor | Ind. |
| 12th | 1837 – 1842 | Charles Fisher | Ref. | John Allen | Ind. | Lemuel Allan Wilmot | Ref. | James Taylor | Ind. |
| 13th | 1843 – 1846 | Charles Fisher | Ref. | John Allen | Ind. | Lemuel Allan Wilmot | Ref. | James Taylor | Ind. |
| 14th | 1847 – 1850 | Charles Fisher | Ref. | Thomas Baillie | Ind. | Lemuel Allan Wilmot | Ref. | James Taylor | Ind. |
| 15th | 1851 – 1854 | George Luther Hathaway | Cons. | Thomas Pickard Jr. | Ind. | Lemuel Allan Wilmot | Ref. | James Taylor | Ind. |
| 16th | 1854 – 1856 | George Luther Hathaway | Cons. | Charles Fisher | Ref. | Charles McPherson | Ind. | James Taylor | Ind. |
| 17th | 1856 – 1857 | George Luther Hathaway | Cons. | Charles Fisher | Ref. | Charles McPherson | Ind. | John Campbell Allen | Ind. |
| 18th | 1857 – 1861 | John McIntosh | Ind. | Charles Fisher | Ref. | Charles McPherson | Ind. | John Campbell Allen | Ind. |
| 19th | 1862 – 1865 | George Luther Hathaway | Cons. | Charles Fisher | Ref. | Hiram Dow | Ind. | John Campbell Allen | Ind. |
| 20th | 1865 – 1866 | George Luther Hathaway | Cons. | John James Fraser | Cons. | William Hayden Needham | Ind. | John Campbell Allen | Ind. |
| 21st | 1866 – 1867 | Hiram Dow | Ind. | Charles Fisher | Ref. | Alexander Thompson | Ind. | John Adolphus Beckwith | Cons. |
| 21st | 1867 – 1868 | Hiram Dow | Ind. | John Pickard | Ind. | Alexander Thompson | Ind. | John Adolphus Beckwith | Cons. |
| 21st | 1869 – 1870 | Hiram Dow | Ind. | William Hayden Needham | Ind. | Alexander Thompson | Ind. | John Adolphus Beckwith | Cons. |
| 22nd | 1870 – 1872 | Robert Robinson | Ind. | George Luther Hathaway | Cons. | Charles McPherson | Ind. | John Adolphus Beckwith | Cons. |
| 22nd | 1872 – 1874 | Robert Robinson | Ind. | John James Fraser | Cons. | Charles McPherson | Ind. | John Adolphus Beckwith | Cons. |
| 23rd | 1875 – 1878 | Robert Robinson | Ind. | John James Fraser | Cons. | Thomas F. Barker | Cons. | Hiram Dow | Ind. |
| 24th | 1879 – 1882 | Andrew George Blair | Lib. | John James Fraser | Cons. | Frederick P. Thompson | Lib. | George J. Colter | Lib.-Con. |
| 25th | 1883 – 1885 | Andrew George Blair | Lib. | Edward Ludlow Wetmore | Lib. | Frederick P. Thompson | Lib. | George J. Colter | Lib.-Con. |
| 25th | 1885 – 1886 | Andrew George Blair | Lib. | Edward Ludlow Wetmore | Lib. | William Wilson | Lib. | George J. Colter | Lib.-Con. |
| 26th | 1886 – 1890 | Andrew George Blair | Lib. | Richard Bellamy | Lib. | William Wilson | Lib. | David R. Moore | Lib. |
| 27th | 1890 | Andrew George Blair | Lib. | Richard Bellamy | Lib. | William Wilson | Lib. | John Anderson | Ind. |
| 27th | 1890 – 1892 | Andrew George Blair | Lib. | Thomas Colter | Cons. | William Wilson | Lib. | John Anderson | Ind. |
| 28th | 1892 – 1895 | William K. Allen | Ind. | William T. Howe | Cons. | James K. Pinder | Cons. | Herman Pitts | Cons. |
| 29th | 1896 – 1899 | John Black | Lib. | William T. Howe | Cons. | James K. Pinder | Cons. | Herman Pitts | Cons. |
| 30th | 1899 – 1901 | William T. Whitehead | Ind. | John A. Campbell | Ind. | Alexander Gibson | Lib. | Frederick P. Thompson | Lib. |
| 30th | 1901 – 1903 | William T. Whitehead | Ind. | John A. Campbell | Ind. | George W. Allen | Ind. | Frederick P. Thompson | Lib. |
| 31st | 1903 – 1908 | William T. Whitehead | Ind. | John A. Campbell | Ind. | George W. Allen | Ind. | George F. Burden | Ind. |
| 32nd | 1908 – 1911 | Harry Fulton McLeod | Cons. | John A. Young | Cons. | Thomas Robison | Cons. | James K. Pinder | Cons. |
| 32nd | 1911 – 1912 | Harry Fulton McLeod | Cons. | John A. Young | Cons. | Oscar E. Morehouse | Cons. | James K. Pinder | Cons. |
| 33rd | 1912 – 1914 | Harry Fulton McLeod | Cons. | John A. Young | Cons. | Oscar E. Morehouse | Cons. | James K. Pinder | Cons. |
| 33rd | 1914 – 1917 | Percy A. Guthrie | Cons. | John A. Young | Cons. | Oscar E. Morehouse | Cons. | James K. Pinder | Cons. |
| 34th | 1917 – 1920 | William C. Crocket | Cons. | John A. Young | Cons. | Samuel B. Hunter | Lib. | James K. Pinder | Cons. |
| 35th | 1921 – 1925 | Charles Dow Richards | Cons. | John A. Young | Cons. | Samuel B. Hunter | Lib. | James K. Pinder | Cons. |
| 36th | 1925 – 1930 | B. H. Dougan | Cons. | G. C. Grant | Cons. | James M. Scott | Cons. | see Fredericton | |
| 37th | 1931 – 1935 | B. H. Dougan | Cons. | Marcus Lorne Jewett | Cons. | James M. Scott | Cons. | Charles Dow Richards | Cons. |
| 38th | 1935 – 1939 | John B. McNair | Lib. | Ernest W. Stairs | Lib. | H. Ralph Gunter | Lib. | Stewart E. Durling | Lib. |
| 39th | 1939 – 1944 | C. Hedley Forbes | Cons. | Charles Price | Cons. | John Rutherford Messer | Cons. | Arthur J. McEvoy | Cons. |
| 40th | 1944 – 1948 | Harry A. Corey | Lib. | Donald T. Cochrane | Lib. | Henry C. Greenlaw | Lib. | John B. McNair | Lib. |
| 41st | 1948 – 1952 | Harry A. Corey | Lib. | Donald T. Cochrane | Lib. | Henry C. Greenlaw | Lib. | John B. McNair | Lib. |
| 42nd | 1952 – 1956 | Harry Ames | PC | C. Weldon Lawrence | PC | John F. McInerney | PC | William J. West | PC |
| 43rd | 1957 – 1960 | Harry Ames | PC | C. Weldon Lawrence | PC | John F. McInerney | PC | William J. West | PC |
| 44th | 1960 – 1963 | Harry Ames | PC | C. Weldon Lawrence | PC | John F. McInerney | PC | George Everett Chalmers | PC |
| 45th | 1963 – 1967 | Harry Ames | PC | C. Weldon Lawrence | PC | John F. McInerney | PC | George Everett Chalmers | PC |
| 46th | 1967 – 1970 | Harry Ames | PC | Carl Mooers | PC | see Fredericton | | | |
| 47th | 1970 – 1974 | Harry Ames | PC | Carl Mooers | PC | | | | |
Riding dissolved into York North and York South

== Election results ==
1970 New Brunswick general election
| Party | Candidate | Votes | Elected |
|---|---|---|---|
| Progressive Conservative | Harry Ames | 6,050 | ✓ |
| Progressive Conservative | Carl Mooers | 5,954 | ✓ |
| Liberal | John Ker | 4,278 | |
| Liberal | Albert A. Knox | 4,272 | |
| New Democratic | James William Bradley | 318 | |
| New Democratic | Richard Lawrence Bright | 295 | |

1967 New Brunswick general election
| Party | Candidate | Votes | Elected |
|---|---|---|---|
| Progressive Conservative | Harry Ames | 5,616 | ✓ |
| Progressive Conservative | Carl Mooers | 5,393 | ✓ |
| Liberal | John Fawcett | 4,755 | |
| Liberal | William Gould | 4,403 | |

== See also ==
- List of New Brunswick provincial electoral districts
- Canadian provincial electoral districts
