= 1st New Brunswick Legislature =

The 1st New Brunswick Legislative Assembly represented New Brunswick between January 3, 1786, and 1792. The lower house was the Legislative Assembly and the upper house was named the Legislative Council.

The assembly sat at the pleasure of the Governor of New Brunswick, Thomas Carleton. The first and second sessions were held at the Mallard House, an inn in Saint John. Subsequent sessions were held in Fredericton.

Amos Botsford was chosen as Speaker Of The House.

== Composition ==
The lower house was the Legislative Assembly and the upper house was named the Legislative Council. The governor of New Brunswick was responsible for the appointment of the Legislative Council.

The General Assembly of New Brunswick had three distinct constitutional elements:

- the Crown (in the person of the appointed Lieutenant-Governor,
- the elected House of Assembly, and
- the Legislative Council, which consisted of members appointed by the Lieutenant-Governor.

In this period, the General Assembly met from two to ten weeks each year and it was then that the elected representatives of the voters could influence public policy. When New Brunswick had a bicameral General Assembly, new legislation had to be read three times and approved by the House of Assembly and then read three times and approved by the Legislative Council. Generally, legislation originated in the House of Assembly sometimes.

== History ==
The Loyalist Migration to Canada (1783-1784) followed the American Revolutionary War brought about 12,000 settlers, chiefly from New York, to this region. Convinced that the government and people of Nova Scotia were alien to their interest, they sought the creation of a new province. Sir Guy Carleton, 1st Baron Dorchester urged their claims at London and in 1784, their desire became reality. In 1785, an election was held and on 3 January 1786, the first legislature of New Brunswick met in the Mallard House, which at that time, Saint John, New Brunswick's leading hostelry once stood on this site.

== Acts ==
Acts that were commonly passed in the 1st New Brunswick Legislative Assembly generally centered around the topics of law and money. As an example, "An Act For Regulating Pilots".

== Members ==
The following are the members for the 1st New Brunswick Legislative:

Electoral District	Name	First elected
Charlotte	William Paine	1786
Charlotte	James Campbell	1786
Charlotte	Robert Pagan	1786
Charlotte	Peter Clinch	1786
Charlotte	Colin Campbell (1789)	1789
Kings	John Coffin	1786
Kings	Ebenezer Foster	1786
Kings	John Hamilton (1788)	1788
Kings	David Fanning (1791)	1791
Northumberland	Elias Hardy	1786
Northumberland	William Davidson	1786
Northumberland	Harris William Hailes (1791)	1791
Queens	Samuel Dickinson	1786
Queens	John Yeamans	1786
Saint John (Note: The members elected for Saint John were known as the Government candidates. Another group of candidates, Tertuluss Dickinson, Richard Lightfoot, Richard Bonsall, Peter Grim, Jonathan Boggs and Alexander Reid, actually received a majority of the votes but were unsuccessful because of the actions of the sheriff in validating the votes. A petition from the voters of Saint John was addressed to the governor but was ignored.)	William Pagan	1786
Saint John	Jonathan Bliss	1786
Saint John	Christopher Billop	1786
Saint John	Ward Chipman	1786
Saint John	John McGeorge	1786
Saint John	Stanton Hazard	1786
Saint John	Nehemiah Rogers (1791)	1791
Sunbury	William Hubbard	1786
Sunbury	Richard Vandeburg	1786
Sunbury	James Glenie (1789)	1789
Westmorland	Amos Botsford	1786
Westmorland	Charles Dixon	1786
Westmorland	Samuel Gay	1786
Westmorland	Andrew Kinnear	1786
York	Daniel Murray	1786
York	Isaac Atwood	1786
York	Daniel Lyman	1786
York	Edward Stelle	1786

== Notes ==
Preceded by none	Legislative Assemblies of New Brunswick; 1786–1792	Succeeded by 2nd New Brunswick Legislature
