= 12th New Brunswick Legislature =

Legislative Assembly

The 12th New Brunswick Legislative Assembly represented New Brunswick between December 28, 1837, and December 1, 1842.

The assembly sat at the pleasure of the Governor of New Brunswick John Harvey. William MacBean George Colebrooke became governor in April 1841.

Charles Simonds was chosen as speaker for the house.

== Members ==
| Electoral District | Name | First elected / previously elected |
|---|---|---|
| Carleton | Jeremiah M. Connell | 1832, 1835 |
| Carleton | Bartholomew C. Beardsley | 1837 |
| Charlotte | Thomas Wyer | 1827 |
| Charlotte | George S. Hill | 1830 |
| Charlotte | James Brown | 1830 |
| Charlotte | Robert Thomson | 1837 |
| Charlotte | James Boyd (1839) | 1839 |
| Gloucester | William End | 1830 |
| Gloucester | Peter Stewart | 1835 |
| Kent | John W. Weldon | 1827 |
| Kent | David McAlmon | 1837 |
| Kings | William McLeod | 1835 |
| Kings | Samuel Freeze | 1819, 1827, 1835 |
| Northumberland | Alexander Rankin | 1827 |
| Northumberland | John Ambrose Street | 1833 |
| Queens | Hugh Johnston, Jr. | 1835 |
| Queens | Thomas Gilbert | 1828 |
| Restigouche | Andrew Barberie | 1838 |
| Saint John City | Thomas Barlow | 1830, 1837 |
| Saint John City | Isaac Woodward | 1835 |
| Saint John County | Charles Simonds | 1820 |
| Saint John County | John R. Partelow | 1827 |
| Saint John County | John M. Wilmot | 1835 |
| Saint John County | John Jordan | 1837 |
| Sunbury | George Hayward, Jr. | 1835 |
| Sunbury | Henry T. Partelow | 1837 |
| Westmorland | William Wilson | 1836 |
| Westmorland | William Crane | 1824 |
| Westmorland | Daniel Hanington | 1835 |
| Westmorland | Philip Palmer | 1835 |
| York | John Allen | 1809 |
| York | James Taylor | 1833 |
| York | Lemuel A. Wilmot | 1835 |
| York | Charles Fisher | 1837 |

| Preceded by 11th New Brunswick Legislature | Legislative Assemblies of New Brunswick; 1837–1842 | Succeeded by 13th New Brunswick Legislature |
