= 11th New Brunswick Legislature =

The 11th New Brunswick Legislative Assembly represented New Brunswick between January 20, 1835, and August 18, 1837.

The assembly sat at the pleasure of the Governor of New Brunswick Sir Archibald Campbell.

The speaker of the house was selected as Charles Simonds.

== Members ==
Electoral District	Name	First elected / previously elected
Carleton	Jeremiah M. Connell	1832, 1835
Carleton	George Morehouse	1835
Charlotte	Thomas Wyer	1827
Charlotte	James Brown	1830
Charlotte	George S. Hill	1830
Charlotte	Patrick Clinch	1830
Gloucester	William End	1830
Gloucester	Peter Stewart	1835
Kent	John W. Weldon	1827
Kent	John P. Ford	1835
Kings	William McLeod	1835
Kings	Samuel Freeze	1819, 1827, 1835
Northumberland	Alexander Rankin	1827
Northumberland	John Ambrose Street	1833
Queens	Hugh Johnston, Jr.	1835
Queens	Thomas Gilbert	1828
Saint John City	Lewis Burns	1835
Saint John City	Isaac Woodward	1835
Saint John County	John R. Partelow	1827
Saint John County	Charles Simonds	1820
Saint John County	George D. Robinson	1835
Saint John County	John M. Wilmot	1835
Sunbury	Thomas O. Miles	1827
Sunbury	George Hayward, Jr.	1835
Westmorland	Philip Palmer	1835
Westmorland	William Crane	1824
Westmorland	Edward B. Chandler	1827
Westmorland	Daniel Hanington	1835
Westmorland	William Wilson (1836)	1836
York	John Allen	1809
York	Jedediah Slason	1830
York	James Taylor	1833
York	Lemuel A. Wilmot	1835
York	D. L. Robinson (1837)	1837

Preceded by 10th New Brunswick Legislature	Legislative Assemblies of New Brunswick; 1835–1837	Succeeded by 12th New Brunswick Legislature
