= 13th New Brunswick Legislature =

The 13th New Brunswick Legislative Assembly represented New Brunswick between December 28, 1843, and September 16, 1846.

The assembly sat at the pleasure of the Governor of New Brunswick William MacBean George Colebrooke.

John Wesley Weldon was chosen as speaker for the house.

== Members ==
| Electoral District | Name | First elected / previously elected |
|---|---|---|
| Carleton | Charles Perley | 1843 |
| Carleton | Jeremiah M. Connell | 1832, 1835 |
| Charlotte | Robert Thomson | 1837 |
| Charlotte | James Boyd | 1839 |
| Charlotte | George Stilman Hill | 1830 |
| Charlotte | James Brown | 1830 |
| Gloucester | William End | 1830 |
| Gloucester | Joshua Alexandre | 1843 |
| Kent | John Wesley Weldon | 1827 |
| Kent | David Wark | 1843 |
| Kings | Samuel Freeze (Note: died in 1844) | 1819, 1827, 1835 |
| Kings | Sylvester Z. Earle | 1843 |
| Kings | William McLeod (1844) | 1844 |
| Northumberland | Alexander Rankin | 1827 |
| Northumberland | John T. Williston (Note: unseated after an appeal) | 1843 |
| Northumberland | John Ambrose Street (1843) | 1833, 1843 |
| Queens | John Earle | 1843 |
| Queens | Thomas Gilbert | 1828 |
| Restigouche | Andrew Barberie | 1838 |
| Restigouche | Peter Stewart | 1843 |
| Saint John City | Robert L. Hazen | 1843 |
| Saint John City | Lewis Burns | 1843 |
| Saint John County | Charles Simonds | 1820 |
| Saint John County | John R. Partelow | 1827 |
| Saint John County | John Jordan | 1837 |
| Saint John County | Robert Payne | 1843 |
| Sunbury | William Scoullar | 1843 |
| Sunbury | Whitehead S. Barker | 1843 |
| Westmorland | Philip Palmer | 1835 |
| Westmorland | John Smith | 1843 |
| Westmorland | William Hazen Botsford | 1843 |
| Westmorland | Daniel Hanington | 1834 |
| York | John Allen | 1809 |
| York | James Taylor | 1833 |
| York | Lemuel A. Wilmot | 1834 |
| York | Charles Fisher | 1837 |

== Notes ==
| Preceded by 12th New Brunswick Legislature | Legislative Assemblies of New Brunswick; 1843–1846 | Succeeded by 14th New Brunswick Legislature |
