= Saint John (provincial electoral district) =

Defunct provincial electoral district in New Brunswick

New Brunswick electoral district

Defunct provincial electoral district
- Legislature: Legislative Assembly of New Brunswick
- District created: 1785
- District abolished: 1795
- First contested: 1785
- Last contested: 1793

Saint John was an electoral district for the Legislative Assembly of New Brunswick. It used a bloc voting system to elect candidates. It was split into the ridings of Saint John City and Saint John County in 1795.

== Members of the Legislative Assembly ==
| Legislature | Years | Member | Party | Member | Party | Member | Party | Member | Party | Member | Party | Member | Party |
|---|---|---|---|---|---|---|---|---|---|---|---|---|---|
| 1st | 1786 – 1792 | William Pagan | Ind. | Jonathan Bliss | Ind. | Christopher Billop | Ind. | Ward Chipman | Ind. | John McGeorge | Ind. | Stanton Hazard | Ind. |
| 2nd | 1793 – 1795 | William Pagan | Ind. | William Thomson | Ind. | George Younghusband | Ind. | Edward Sands | Ind. | Bradford Gilbert | Ind. | Elias Hardy | Ind. |
Riding dissolved into Saint John City and Saint John County

== See also ==
- List of New Brunswick provincial electoral districts
