= Flewelling =

Flewelling is a surname. Notable people with the surname include:

- Gabriel Flewelling (1842–1922), Canadian politician
- Lynn Flewelling (born 1958), American writer
- Ralph Tyler Flewelling (1871–1960), American philosopher and academic
- William P. Flewelling (1814–1875), Canadian politician
