= George Leonard (disambiguation) =

George Leonard (1923–2010) was an American author and pioneer in the Human Potential Movement

George Leonard may also refer to:

- George Leonard (colonial administrator) (c.1655-c. 1735), British Deputy Governor of Anguilla
- George Leonard (American politician) (1729–1819), U.S. congressman from Massachusetts
- George Leonard (New Brunswick) (1742–1826), Canadian farmer, New Brunswick politician
- George Leonard Jr. (died 1818), Canadian lawyer and political figure
- George B. Leonard (1872–1956), American attorney
- George Hare Leonard (1863–1941), professor of history
- George Leonard (ice hockey) (1886–1917), Canadian ice hockey player
