= Charlotte County Militia =

Militia unit in New Brunswick

The Charlotte County Militia was a militia organization in Charlotte County, New Brunswick. It was one of the original county regiments of the New Brunswick Militia established after the passage of the Provincial Militia Act by the 1st New Brunswick Legislature in 1787. The legislation required all men between 16 and 50 years of age to enrol, with exemptions for certain professions such as school teachers, millers, and ferrymen.

== Early years ==
Thomas Carleton, the Lieutenant Governor of New Brunswick, appointed Robert Pagan of St. Andrews colonel in command of the Charlotte County Militia. Unlike the other original county militia colonels appointed by Carleton, Pagan had no military experience. He served until approximately 1808 and was succeeded by Hugh Mackay of St. George.

During the war between Britain and France which began in 1793 the regular British garrison was withdrawn from New Brunswick, leaving the militias to defend the province's coastal settlements. In August 1795 a detachment of the Charlotte County militia led by Mackay and Captain Nathan Frink prevented a French privateer from carrying out raids on New Brunswick territory. The ship La Solide entered Passamaquoddy Bay and some crew members landed but the militia captured them and took them to St. Andrews as prisoners. The ship, some of whose crew were Americans, was also captured. The expedition had been organized by pro-French Americans and the sheriff of the neighbouring Washington County, Massachusetts cooperated with the New Brunswick authorities in arresting them. This raid was "the only attempt to invade or pillage made on the soil of New Brunswick during the continuance of the war."

== Battalions of the Charlotte County Militia ==
In 1808 the county regiments of the New Brunswick militia were reorganized into battalions, each of which was under the command of a lieutenant-colonel. In the same year the rank of militia colonel was eliminated. Eventually the Charlotte County militia comprised four battalions, all of which were dissolved after Canadian Confederation in 1867.

The First Battalion Charlotte County militia was a continuation of the original militia regiment. It was based in St. Andrews. The uniform in the 1860s was a scarlet tunic with blue facings and navy blue trousers.

The Second Battalion was formed in 1811 and was based in St. George. The first commanding officer was Thomas Wyer, a United Empire Loyalist who was succeeded in the role by his son Thomas Wyer Jr. The battalion uniform was the same as the first battalion's but with sky blue facings on the tunic.

The Third Battalion was formed in 1822 and was headquartered at Campobello. Its uniform was the same as the first battalion's but with yellow facings on the tunic.

The Fourth Battalion was formed in 1832 with its headquarters at St. Stephen. Its uniform was the same as those of the other battalions but with white facings on the tunic.

== Suspension and reorganization ==
By the 1850s the British government wanted the North American provinces to take more responsibility for their own defence, rather than relying on British garrisons. The New Brunswick government disagreed, and in 1852 the province's legislative assembly suspended the militia act and refused to spend any money on defence, which they considered to be an "imperial and not a provincial matter". The Suspending Act was renewed in 1856 for another 5 years and the militia remained inactive. In 1860 the example of the British volunteer movement led to the formation of a volunteer militia in New Brunswick consisting of 13 infantry and 6 artillery companies. This development was supported by Arthur Hamilton Gordon, who in 1861 became the province's lieutenant-governor and the militia commander in chief. The Militia Act of 1862 organized the provincial militia into Class A (volunteers, or active militia), and two classes of "sedentary militia": Class B (unmarried men and childless widowers between 16 and 45) and Class C (married men and widowers with children between 16 and 45). Another Militia Act in 1865 provided for camps of instruction where volunteers would be trained by instructors from the British army garrison. The volunteers in turn were responsible for training the members of the sedentary militia.

== Response to the Fenians ==
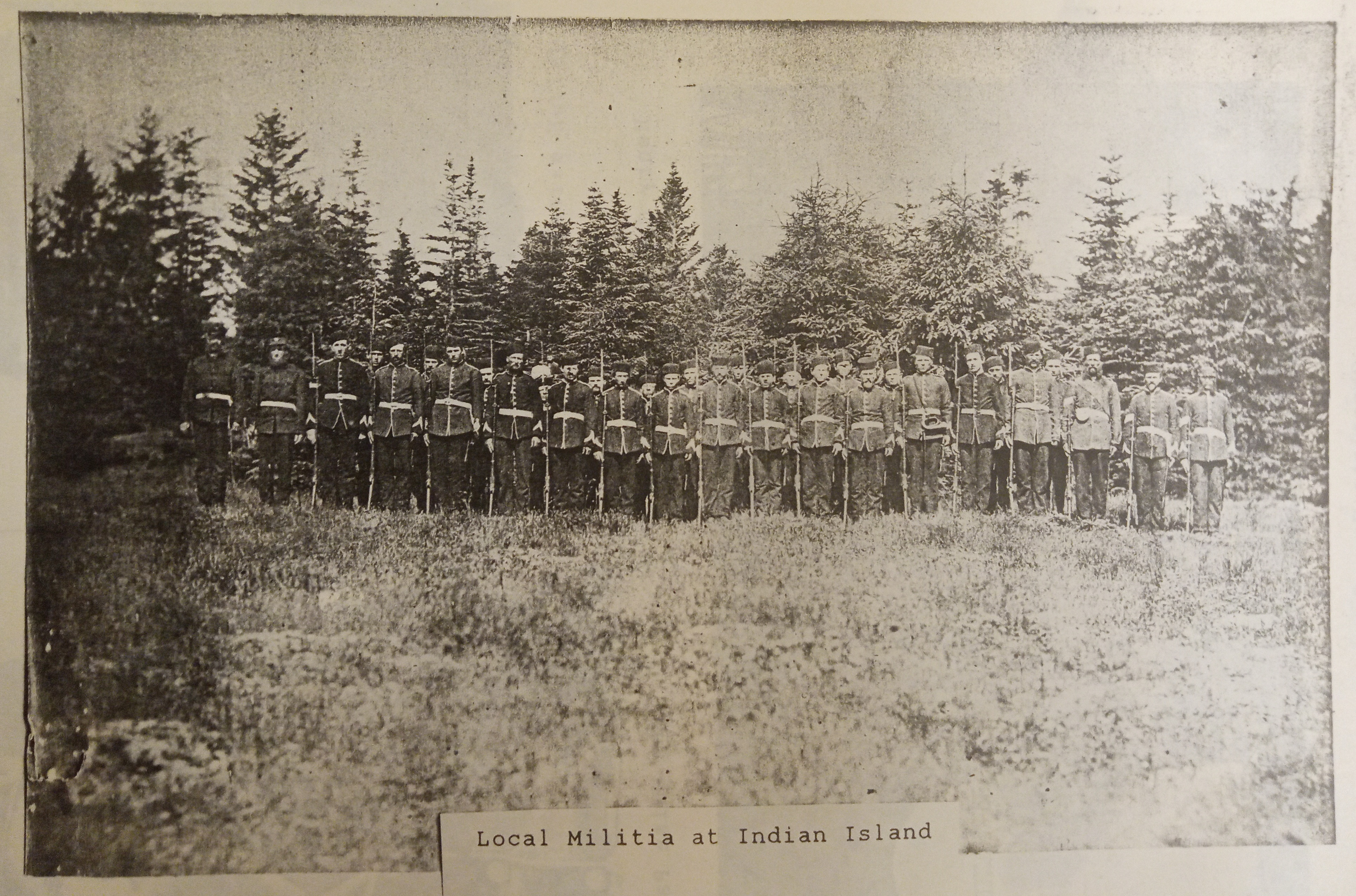
Indian Island was the muster site of the Charlotte County Militia.

A faction of the Fenian Brotherhood, an Irish republican organization based in the United States, was known to advocate attacking British North America. The provinces of Canada and New Brunswick were proposed as targets. In December 1865 Lieutenant-Governor Gordon visited Charlotte County to organize the defence against what he expected to be "small-scale raids across the Maine border, most likely in the small bands of marauders robbing and plundering frontier communities".

Gordon proposed establishing home guard units in the border towns. In St. Stephen Lieutenant Colonel James A. Inches of the 4th Battalion Charlotte County Militia immediately raised a home guard company of over 100 men, while companies were formed in two nearby towns. The St. Stephen militia's rifle company began daily drilling.

In St. Andrews a home guard was raised and commanded by a retired British Army captain. Lieutenant Colonel James Boyd of the 1st Battalion Charlotte County Militia, had opposed Gordon's 1862 reforms and had refused to allow the formation of a Class A militia company. In January 1865, following an inquiry ordered by Gordon into the situation in St. Andrews, a Class A volunteer company of the active militia (the "Gordon Rifles") was set up, as well as a volunteer artillery company. In March 1865 Boyd was replaced as commanding officer of the 1st Battalion by Cuthbert Willis, a retired British Army major.

St. George, under Lieutenant Colonel Douglas Wetmore of the 2nd Battalion, had two Class A volunteer companies and a home guard company. A two-story blockhouse, called Fort Carleton was built and equipped with two cannons and a swivel gun owned by the commanding officer.

The 3rd Battalion was headquartered in Deer Island where it was commanded by Lieutenant Colonel James Brown. It was responsible for defending the islands in Passamaquoddy Bay (the West Isles), including Campobello, which the Fenians had publicly announced they intended to attack. By mid-March 1866 Campobello had a class A volunteer rifle company and a home guard unit. Deer Island also had two volunteer militia companies.

As of April 1866 the battalion companies and their commanders were:

1st Battalion: Saint Andrews, divided into two companies under Major B. R. Stephenson and Captain E. S. Polley.
2nd Battalion: St George, under Lt. Col. D. Wetmore, divided into two companies under Capt. J. Bogue and Capt. J. Bolton.
3rd Battalion: West Isles, under Lt. Col. Brown, divided into three companies under Capt. L. Byron, Capt. A. Lloyd, and Capt. J. Grew.
4th Battalion: St. Stephen, under Lt. Col. J. Inches, divided into three companies under Capt. TJ Smith, Capt. W.A. Murchie and Capt. J.W. McAdam.

On March 17, 1865, the Fenian leader John O'Mahony authorized Bernard Doran Killian to lead an expedition to seize Campobello. The plan was to use the island as "a base from which to launch an invasion of Ireland and gain belligerent status to legally issue letters of marque to privateers who could disrupt British sea trade". In early April Killian and a group of several hundred Fenians arrived in Eastport, Maine, which was intended to be the staging ground for the attack on Campobello. A ship had been loaded with arms and was on its way to Eastport.

The Fenians' plan to seize Campobello was unsuccessful. The United States government had sent General George Meade to Eastport to enforce American neutrality, and he seized and impounded the Fenians' shipment of arms when he arrived on April 19. Meanwhile, the Royal Navy sent several ships to defend Passamaquoddy Bay and several hundred British army reinforcements under the command of Sir Charles Hastings Doyle arrived at St. Andrew's on April 19. The Fenians left Eastport over the following weeks, Killian was expelled from the organization, and O'Mahony was forced to resign his leadership.

Lieutenant Colonel George Maunsell, the adjutant general of the New Brunswick Militia at the time, later remarked on the "excellent military spirit" of the Charlotte County volunteers. In November 1866 Maunsell inspected the eight companies of the Charlotte County militia at St. Stephen, St. Andrews, Deer Island, Campobello and St. George and commended the "men of the Western Isles" for their "splendid physique" and for being "skilled in many important industries, in fishing, boat building, carpentering and farming".

== Confederation and after ==
After Confederation in 1867 the Canadian government became responsible for militia affairs and New Brunswick became one of 9 military districts. In 1871 after several years of reorganization "the last vestiges of an independent militia structure in New Brunswick disappeared".

In January 1899 the British government issued a commemorative medal for living veterans of the Fenian Raids. The medal was not awarded posthumously. 47 of the medals were awarded to former members of the Third Battalion Charlotte County Militia. One of these was acquired in 2025 by the New Brunswick Military History Museum at CFB Gagetown.

In April 1912 the Canadian government passed the Fenian Raid Volunteer Bounty Act, which gave $100 to militia members called out in 1866. The act was later amended to provide the bounty to members' widows.
