= James Alexander Murray =

Canadian politician

16th Premier of New Brunswick
- In office February 1, 1917 – April 4, 1917
- Monarch: George V
- Lieutenant Governor: Josiah Wood
- Preceded by: George J. Clarke
- Succeeded by: Walter E. Foster

MLA for Kings
- In office March 3, 1908 – October 9, 1920 Serving with George Burpee Jones, Frederick M. Sproule, Hedley V. Dickson
- Preceded by: William Pugsley
- Succeeded by: Ormond W. Wetmore

Personal details
- Born: November 9, 1864 Moncton, New Brunswick, British North American
- Died: February 16, 1960 (aged 95) Sussex, New Brunswick, Canada
- Party: Conservative
- Occupation: businessman
- Profession: politician

James Alexander Murray (9 November 1864 in Moncton, New Brunswick – 16 February 1960) was a Conservative politician and the 16th premier of New Brunswick. Murray was first elected to the legislature in 1908 and served as Minister of Agriculture before becoming Premier in 1917 only to have his government defeated in the general election weeks later.
