= Sylvester Zobieski Earle =

Canadian mayor (1822–1888)

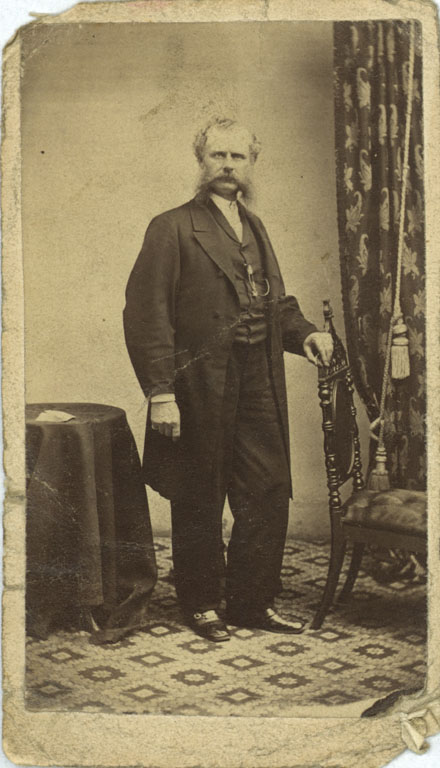
- Earle, c. 1865

28th Mayor of Saint John, New Brunswick
- In office 1877–1879
- Preceded by: A. Chipman Smith
- Succeeded by: Charles R. Ray

Personal details
- Born: August 7, 1822 Kingston, New Brunswick
- Died: April 1, 1888 (aged 65) Saint John, New Brunswick

Sylvester Zobieski Earle (August 7, 1822 – March 1, 1888) was a medical doctor and political figure in New Brunswick, Canada. He was mayor of Saint John, New Brunswick in 1877 and 1878.

== Biography ==
He was born in Kingston, New Brunswick, the son of Sylvester Zobieski Earle and Maria Hughson, and studied medicine at the University of the City of New York. In 1845, Earle returned to New Brunswick and joined his father in practice at Hampton. In 1847, he married Catherine McGill Otty, the sister of judge George Otty. In 1857, he was named county coroner. He also served as commissioned surgeon in the local militia with the 62nd Saint John Fusiliers, serving with the Fenian Raids in 1866. Earle helped lead the reconstruction efforts following the great fire in Saint John in June 1877. He died in Saint John at the age of 65.
