= John Yeamans (disambiguation) =

John Yeamans was a colonial administrator.

John Yeamans may also refer to:

- John Yeamans (politician)

== See also ==
- John Yeaman, Scottish prisoner
