= Ross Island (New Brunswick) =

Island in New Brunswick, Canada

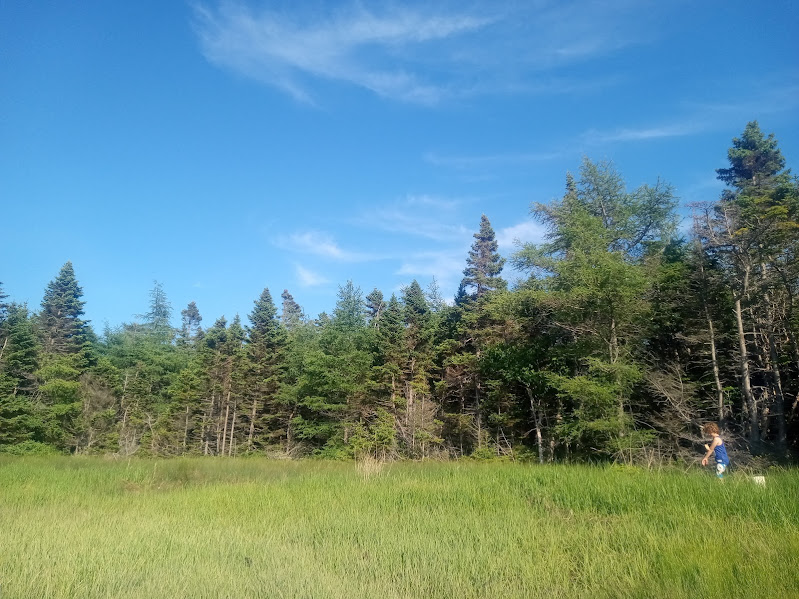
- The western edge of Ross Island
- Interactive map of Ross Island

Geography
- Location: Bay of Fundy
- Coordinates: 44°40′9″N 66°44′4″W
- Area: 372.9 ha (921 acres)

Administration
- Canada
- Province: New Brunswick
- County: Charlotte
- Parish: Grand Manan Parish

Ross Island (previously known as Harbour Island and White Land Island)is an island in the Grand Manan Parish of Charlotte County, New Brunswick, Canada in the Bay of Fundy. It is a tidal island that forms the eastern shore of Grand Harbour on Grand Manan island.

Ross Island was the first part of Grand Manan to be settled by United Empire Loyalists in 1784. From 1879 it was the site of a lighthouse that marked the entrance to Grand Harbour.

In 2021 the Nature Trust of New Brunswick purchased the majority of the island, which was officially designated the Keiko and Errol Nature Preserve in 2024. The island is predominantly spruce and fir forest, with Arctic terns and Carolina wrens.

== Settlement ==
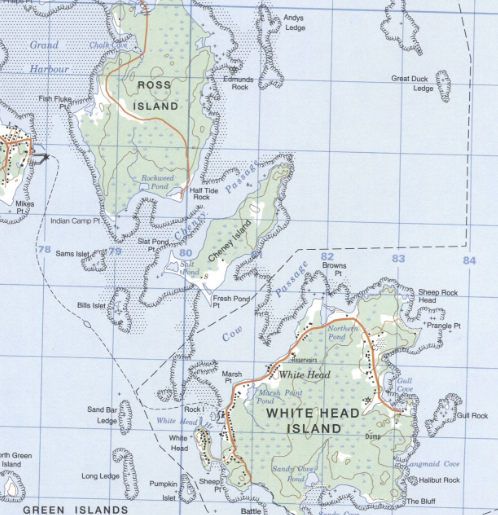
Map showing Ross Island between Grand Manan and Wood Island

A license signed by the governor of Nova Scotia on 30 December 1783 permitted the United Empire Loyalists John Jones, Thomas Oxnard, Thomas Ross, Peter Jones, and Moses Gerrish, "and others, being fifty families, to occupy during pleasure the Island of Grand Manan, and the small islands adjacent in the fishery, with liberty of cutting frame stuff and timber for building." The five named licensees hoped to receive a grant to the entire island of Grand Manan if they succeeded in attracting fifty families to the island in seven years, but they were not able to achieve this goal. The first settlers, including Moses Gerrish, arrived on Ross Island, then known as Harbour Island, on 6 May 1784 before settling Grand Manan while both Ross and Gerrish maintained homes on the original island. Gerrish is buried on Ross Island.

Ross was a mariner from Falmouth, Maine. Upon settling in the area, he began trading with the West Indies and was granted ownership of Ross Island.

== The Grand Harbour Lighthouse ==
Ross Island was the site of the Grand Harbour Lighthouse, which was constructed in 1879. The lighthouse was decommissioned after a light was installed on the breakwater at Ingalls Head, at the entrance to Grand Harbour opposite Ross Island. The last keeper left in August 1963 and the building was abandoned. It was severely damaged during the Groundhog Day gale of 1976 and continued to deteriorate until it was declared "North America's most endangered lighthouse" by Lighthouse Digest in 1999. The building finally collapsed during a gale on 19 November 2013.

== The Keiko and Errol Nature Preserve ==
In 2020, it was announced Ross Island would be the Nature Trust's most expensive venture to date, conserving 860 acres. In 2024 the Nature Trust of New Brunswick established the 372-hectare Keiko and Errol Nature Preserve on Ross Island after a fundraising campaign that raised CA$ 1.4M.
