= William Pagan =

William Pagan may refer to:

- William Pagan (politician)
- William Pagan (railway engineer)
