= Nathan Frink =

United Empire Loyalist (1758–1817)

Nathan Frink UE

Personal details
- Born: May 19, 1758 Pomfret, Connecticut Colony, British America
- Died: December 4, 1817 (aged 59) St. Stephen, New Brunswick
- Spouse: Hester Cuyler
- Children: 11
- Occupation: Lawyer; merchant; politician

Military service
- Allegiance: United States (until 1780); Great Britain (from 1780)
- Branch/service: British Army
- Years of service: 1780–1783
- Rank: Captain
- Unit: King's American Dragoons; American Legion
- Battles/wars: American Revolution; Battle of Groton Heights

Captain Nathan Frink Jr. (May 19, 1758 – December 4, 1817) was an American lawyer in Pomfret, Connecticut, and later a United Empire Loyalist in colonial New Brunswick. He joined the American Revolution first on the side of the Patriots and then switched to support the British, following which he was derided by Patriots as "a notorious traitor to the States".

He took a land grant from the Crown after the war, making his home in New Brunswick, where he served as a Member of the Legislative Assembly.

== Revolutionary War ==
=== Patriot service ===
Known as a "brisk, smart, young man" and a successful lawyer who cooperated with Oliver Grosvenor in planting prominent avenues of elm trees around Pomfret, Frink was appointed Deputy Stampmaster of Windham at the time the American colonies began to protest the Stamp Act of 1765.

On August 24, 1775, Frink was noted as having secured six guns and ten blankets "to supply the loss of our soldiers at Bunker Hill.

Frink turned to gunsmithing for the States, and in 1776 he and seven others were named to a committee by the Governor Jonathan Trumbull and Assembly of the State of Connecticut to procure firearms for the Patriot army. Frink had attended the General Assembly as the "Representative of the Freemen" of Pomfret alongside Thomas Williams.

He was again called upon for procurement of firearms for 1777, and was also named a Justice of the Peace by the State Assembly in May 1777. In October 1777, Capt. Thomas Fanning of the Continental Army left New York and deposited a 35£ bill of exchange in favor of Nathan Frink drawn by Lt. Colin McKenzie on the paymaster of the 71st Regiment. Capt. Fanning wrote to Samuel Blachley Webb seeking information for himself or Frink, who was then on the front lines, about the money.

In January 1778 Frink went into business with Elisha Childs and Benjamin Cargill to produce 100 muskets for the local Committee of Safety, although there was a late concern they'd only be able to provide 50 and were uncertain even of those.

In February 1778, Frink was granted permission by the State Assembly to cross enemy lines to New York "to transact some business". On April 12, 1778, Frink wrote to Col. Webb, who by then had been captured and paroled to Long Island, New York stating he sent along "several papers and a small book from Gen. Parsons" which he suggested "by perusing the letters you'll obtain a very plain idea of what I could wish to obtain.". He included a cryptic postscript, "Jack Heart-well — Worcester. All except Whiting, in consumption. Dont expect to see him alive on return. Vistelle resigned. In great haste."

In the following days, Frink stopped in to visit Col. Webb's brother and sister, having them to Col. Webb with social updates and that if an "Ensign Green" should visit then Webb should follow him to help out Mrs. Van Horn. On May 11, Frink wrote noting Webb's influence with Mrs Van Horn would be of great service in settling a matter, and noting Mrs Van Horn "can get Continental or Connecticut loan office certificates at six percent interest" In June, Frink wrote back noting he'd received a letter from Col. Webb that hadn't mentioned the documents he'd sent, noting "I do assure you there was not a syllable could in any way injure the public" and explaining away that his references to a Mrs. Van Horn were a trivial real estate matter. On January 8, 1779, Frink wrote to Col. Webb noting "Your friend SHP left this day before yesterday...at Kpps. Col. Eno's compliments, Bush, &c, &c, &c", which later compilers noted may be a cipher.

Frink testified on July 6, 1779, that he had witnessed Diah Cooke of New Haven smuggling British goods from New York hidden in his wagon.

=== Loyalist service ===
After working as a spy for the Americans for a substantial period, Frink saw little hope of success for the rebelling States and switched back his allegiance to re-adopt the British cause.

Massachusetts representative Lorenzo Sabine noted it was probable that, had Frink's neighbours treated him differently he would have remained loyal to the Patriots. It was also said he had been passed over for promotion, and Frink "thought himself ill-treated".

On July 31, 1779, the British-aligned veteran Joshua Loring wrote to the Lt. Col. John Graves Simcoe of the Queen's Rangers that Nathan Frink was awaiting to have British troops bring an enclosed document under flag of truce to the Continental Army's outpost. Since Frink had formally resigned his commission with the Americans before taking allegiance to the British, he was not guilty of desertion. Still, Frink's Pomfret estate that he had inherited from his father was later seized.

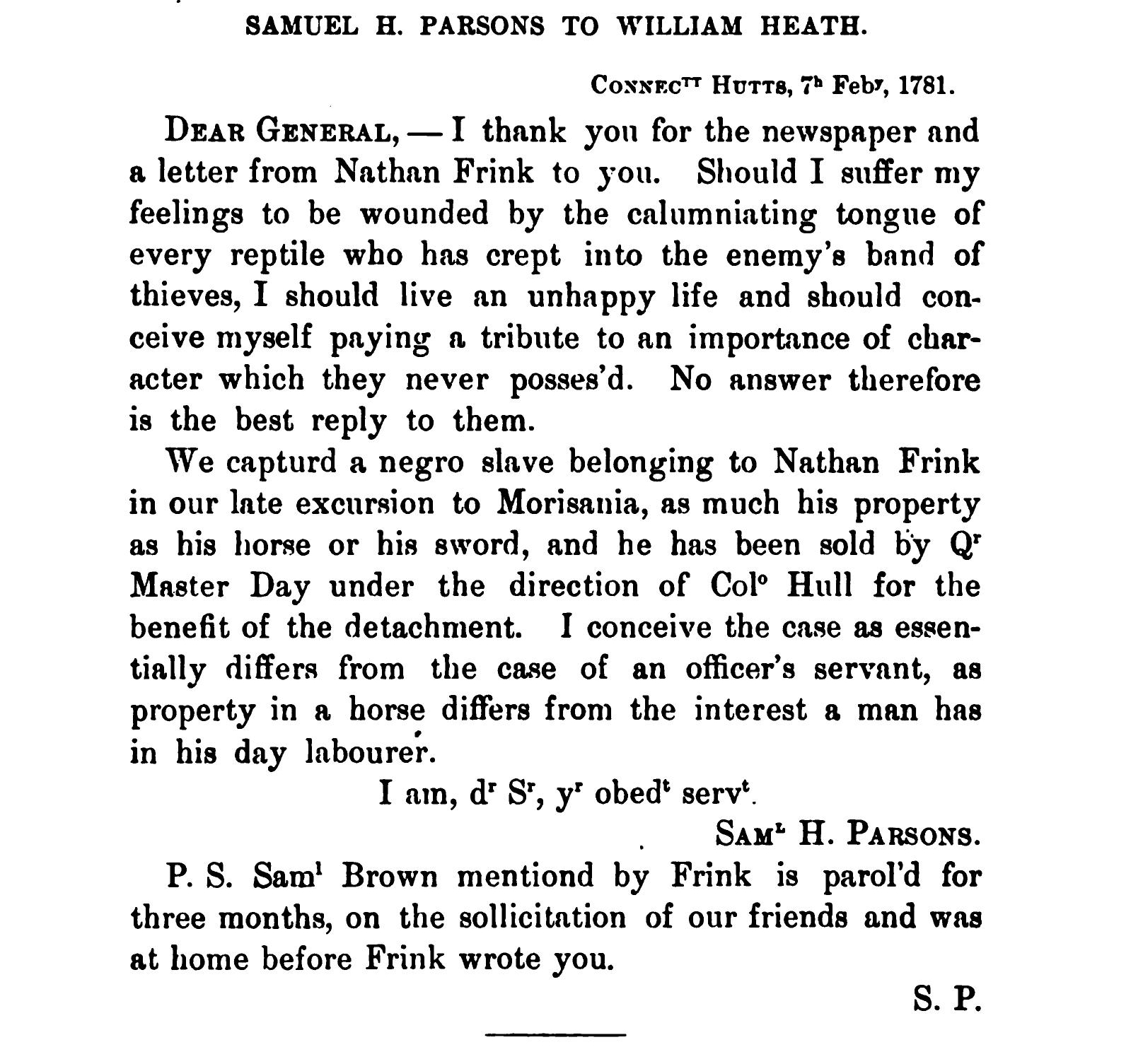
In February 1781, Gnl. Parsons wrote to Gnl. Heath, referencing a letter that Frink had written to Heath insulting Parsons. Parsons notes that they have captured "a negro slave" belonging to Frink and sold him to raise funds to benefit the soldiers involved.

Frink served a cavalry Captain in the King's American Dragoons under Benedict Arnold, to whom he served as an aide de camp. By July 1, 1780, Frink was accompanying raids in New York.

In 1781, Frink commanded the main battle force of Loyalists under Arnold capturing the new Fort Trumbull in the Battle of Groton Heights.

At one point Frink was captured, and placed in the Stamford guard house in the custody of James Wilson who was bribed to facilitate his escape. This led Jonathan Trumbull to write to General Washington asking whether Wilson's flag of truce at the time of his own capture merited amnesty. Wilson was tied to the tail of a horse and driven through town in humiliation, before being placed in a tree outside the Episcopalian minister's home, and then transferred to another prison where he was shot by a sentry. Fade Donaldson and Samuel Lockwood also hanged Brom Barrett, on suspicion of being a spy and effecting Frink's escape.

Frink led 300 refugees from Horseneck Meeting House to Bedford, and stopped at Clapboard Ridge, a farming community in mid-country Greenwich, Connecticut where they seized horses, cattle, sheep and hogs and took them to Morrisania after a skirmish with whaleboat militia guards. A whaleboat man, Henry Chichester, later recalled that in a skirmish off Davenport Neck that killed two British troops, Captain Frink had offered mercy to any irregulars who surrendered causing a fighter named Jones to respond "If you will wheel your horse about in five minutes, very well - otherwise I will instantly order my men to fire", causing Frink to withdraw.

In August 1783, a month before he quit the Colonies upon the disbanding of the American Legion, Frink joined Capt. G. Livingstone in renewing a plea that as the Inspector General had declined their June memo seeking horses and carbines for their troops, they asked for a reasonable number of men or reimbursement for repairs.

== Resettlement and life in New Brunswick ==
Frink married Hester Cuyler at Trinity Church in New York City on February 1, 1783. On September 18, 1783, Frink and Hester left New York harbour with their two enslaved African children, James and Diana, on the ship "Elizabeth", helmed by Captain Watson. James, 16, had been a gift to his wife from her mother, and Diana, age seven, had been purchased from Mrs. Beadle of Staten Island. As a United Empire Loyalist, Frink was granted four lots of land in Parrtown, today part of Saint John, New Brunswick. He left Saint John to move to Campobello Island, where he was implicated as part of a smuggling ring along with Moses Gerrish, who acted as the chief customs officer on Grand Manan. Frink offered to lease the entire island from David Owen, who resented him and declined the offer, calling Frink "by no means a fit tenant" for Campobello. Frink had earlier been called in 1791 as a crown witness against Owen for assault during a fracas with seamen.

Frink relocated to Saint Andrews, where he was granted the right in 1795 to erect a windmill while serving as an officer in the Charlotte County Militia. On September 11, 1795, the French privateer ship La Solide attempted to pillage St. Andrews upon the urging of Maine residents Andrew Bowman and Peter Merang. After landing a team of plunderers, the ship and its crew were captured by the Charlotte County Militia, transported to St. Andrews as prisoners of war and held for four days, chiefly by Captain Frink. He spent the following eight years requesting and receiving reimbursements for his service before an 1803 payment to satisfy "in full" his service during the incident.

During one of his petitions to the legislature, the phrase "Get to the Frink" came to replace "Get to the point", for those gathered and for years later was used with humour. Frink finally settled in St. Stephen, where he became involved in the Bank of St. Stephen and was elected the MLA for Charlotte County. He also became a ship owner.

In 1801, Francis Mathews Jr. complained to Frink, who was now appointed magistrate, that Owen had sworn out a warrant alleging Mathews was of bad character for keeping "a poor transient woman" in the marital home with his wife, leading Mathews to counter demanding a warrant against Owen for keeping the married woman Hannah Smith in his own home as a servant.

Mathews further noted Owen had imprisoned his own deputy sheriff on charges of conspiring to murder him, leading Frink and John McKenzie to request a further meeting about how to address dozens of complaints of "suffering unjustly from summonses, warrant and ex parte affidavits" issued by Owen as apparent lawfare against his neighbours. Frink declined to issue a warrant, but brought the two complaints before General Sessions in April 1802, and further wrote a pamphlet ridiculing Owens' cohabitation "in a most convoluted language".

Owen, who was a Justice of the Peace, brought an unsuccessful libel suit against Magistrate Frink and Magistrate Robert Pagan for having entertained legal accusations against him, for Frink having written a personal note in the margins of Mathew's filings, and for ridiculing his efforts to run for office. On one occasion, Thomas Farrell, the developer of Deer Island, travelled to Fredericton with the intent of challenging Frink to a duel, as was his custom. By 1816, Frink was the government agent overseeing Charlotte County's fisheries, leading to a lawsuit against him.

In 1803, Col. Hugh Mackay wrote to Colonel Edward Winslow, noting "between you and me, peace and tranquility will never be effectually established in this County while Robert Pagan, Nathan Frink and Ninian Lindsay are continued on the Commission of the Peace. The two latter the real incendiaries - indeed from teh violent conduct of all three, both at home and abroad, they have forfeited all claim to the least indulgence from Government.

On March 17, 1804, Frink declared a $100 reward for the capture of John Gilley, master of the ship Nancy who he accused of stealing his wares being shipped from New Haven before attempting to flee to the West Indies.

After his death, he was buried in St. Stephen's Loyalist Burying Ground. Frink's sister had married Schuyler Putnam, son of US General Israel Putnam, and they donated to the St. Stephen Bible Society following Frink's death. When the wife of Frink's son George died, two of the children named Elizabeth ("Lib") and Charlotte ("Lot") were subsequently raised by Frink's youngest daughter, Charlotte Ann, who was married to William Thompson. The house built in St. Stephen for his son James, a ship owner and magistrate, was added to the Canadian Register of Historic Places in 2007.
