= Harry A. McMackin =

Canadian politician

Member of the Legislative Assembly of New Brunswick
- In office 1939–1944
- Constituency: Kings

Personal details
- Born: February 10, 1880 Havelock, New Brunswick
- Died: October 13, 1946 (aged 66) Havelock, New Brunswick
- Party: Progressive Conservative Party of New Brunswick
- Spouse: Ica M. Perry
- Occupation: farmer

Harry Albert McMackin (February 10, 1880 – October 13, 1946) was a Canadian politician. He served in the Legislative Assembly of New Brunswick as member of the Progressive Conservative party from 1939 to 1944.
