= Mather Byles (loyalist) =

Congressional clergyman

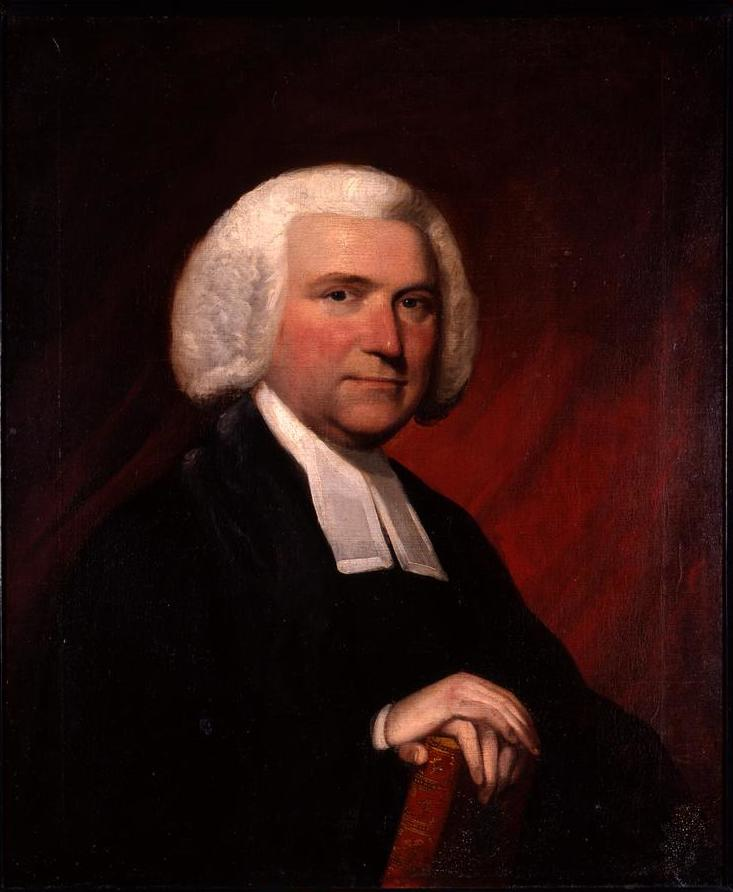
- Born: 12 January 1734/1735; Boston, Massachusetts
- Died: 12 March 1814; Saint John, New Brunswick
- Education: Harvard College, Yale College, University of Oxford
- Occupations: cleric, rector of Christ Church, Boston

Mather Byles II (12 January 1734/1735 – 12 March 1814), was a Congregational clergyman at New London, Connecticut Colony, until 1768. In 1768, he entered the Established Church, and became rector of Christ Church, Boston.

Sympathizing with the royal cause, he settled, after the War of Independence, in Halifax, Nova Scotia as Chaplain to the Garrison and later in Saint John, New Brunswick, where he was rector of a church until his death. He is buried at the Loyalist Burial Ground in Saint John.

The son of Mather Byles (1706–1788), he graduated from Harvard College in 1751 at the age of twelve, and later received his MA from the school. He also graduated from Yale College and the University of Oxford.
