= Oscar E. Morehouse =

Canadian politician (1857–1935)

Oscar Emery Morehouse

Member of the Legislative Assembly of New Brunswick for York County
- In office 1911–1917
- Preceded by: Thomas Robison

Personal details
- Born: 5 August 1857 Upper Keswick, New Brunswick, British North America
- Died: 1 January 1935 (aged 77) Fredericton, New Brunswick, Canada
- Party: Conservative
- Spouse: Ella Alberta Neales McKiel

Oscar Emery Morehouse (August 5, 1857 – January 1, 1935) was a Canadian medical doctor and Conservative political figure. He represented York County in the New Brunswick provincial legislature from 1911 to 1917.

A graduate of McGill Medical School, Morehouse practiced family medicine in the Kedgwick Ridge area of New Brunswick. He was first elected in a 1911 by-election held following the death of Thomas Robison. Re-elected in the 1912 general, he retired from politics to return to his medical practice at the dissolution of the 33rd Legislature in 1917.

Morehouse's granddaughter, Patricia Crossman, would also sit in the legislature as the Progressive Conservative member for Riverview from 1999 to her death in 2002.
