= Colin Campbell (probate judge) =

Canadian politician (1752–1834)

Colin Campbell (June 1752 – July 1834) was a Scottish-born lawyer, probate judge, official and political officer in Nova Scotia. He represented Shelburne Township in the Nova Scotia House of Assembly from 1793 to 1818.

He was born in Inverary, the son of David Campbell, and moved to New York City in 1776, later settling in Nova Scotia as a United Empire Loyalist. In 1789, he was named customs collector at Shelburne.

In 1818, he moved to St. Andrews, New Brunswick, serving as customs collector there. He retired in 1828 and moved to Weymouth in Digby County. In 1818, when the provincial parliament was dissolved over the issue of timber duties, Robert Pagan, Colin Campbell, Hugh Mackay and Joseph Porter were elected members of Assembly for Charlotte County.

He died in Sissiboo in Digby County.

Campbell was a first cousin of Sir Colin Campbell, lieutenant-governor of Nova Scotia. He was married twice, first to Alice Hogg, the widow of Samuel Campbell and mother of Samuel Campbell, then to Elizabeth Hardy. His grandson Colin Campbell also served in the provincial assembly.
