= King's American Dragoons =

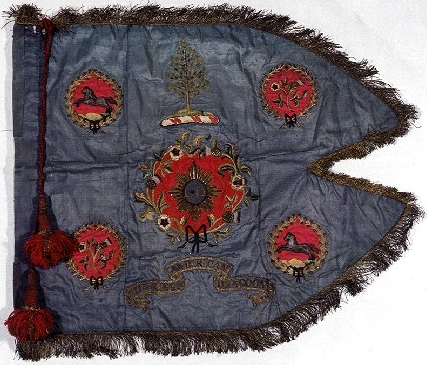
- Colours of the King's American Dragoons
- Active: 1781-October 1783
- Country: Great Britain
- Allegiance: British Army
- Branch: Dragoons (mounted infantry)
- Type: British provincial unit, (auxiliary troops)
- Role: Demolition, construction
- Size: Unknown
- Garrison/HQ: Long Island, Province of New York
- Engagements: American Revolutionary War

Commanders
- Notable commanders: Major General Sir Guy Carleton Lieutenant Colonel Benjamin Thompson

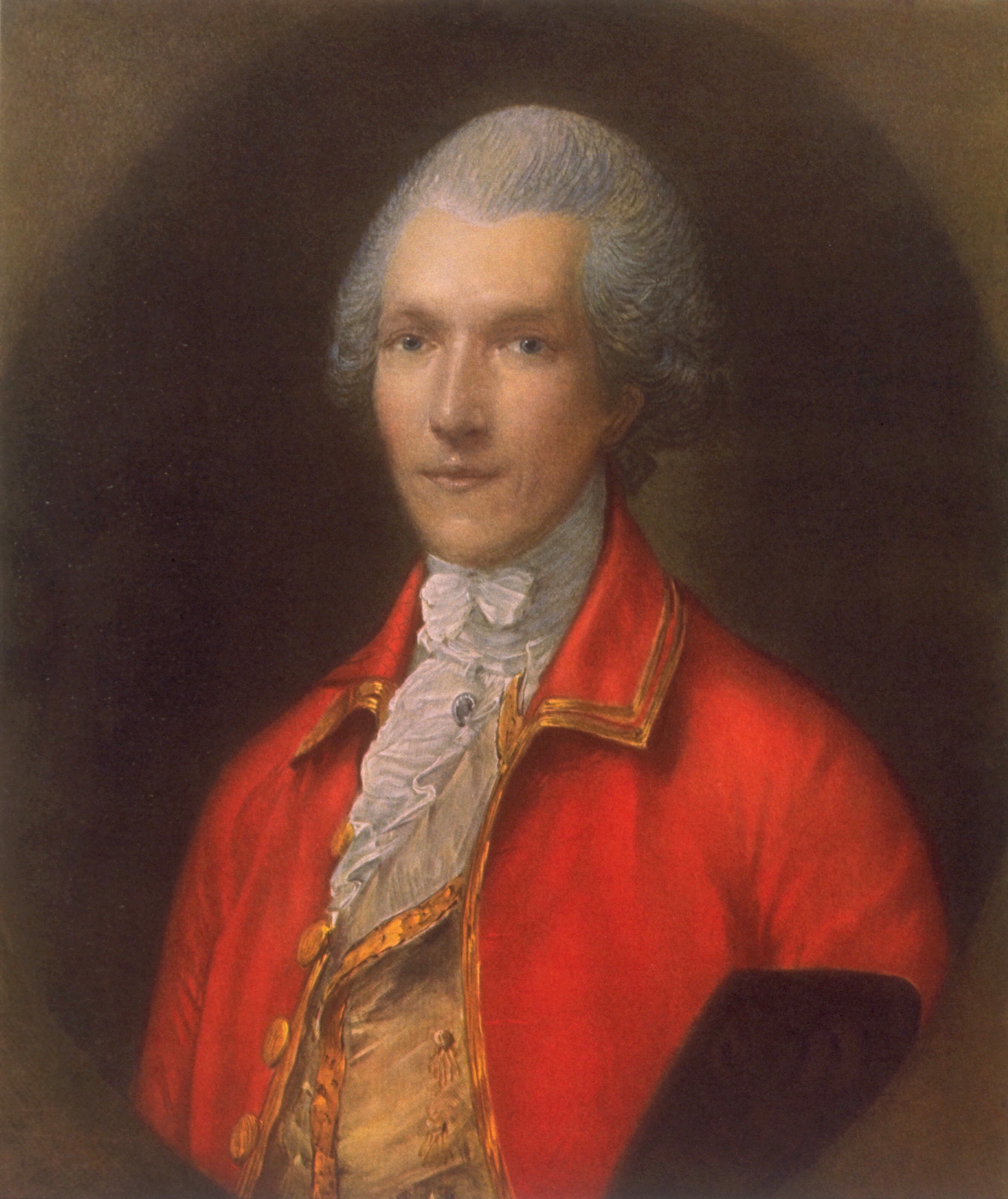
Lt. Col. Benjamin Thompson Count Rumford

The King's American Dragoons were a British provincial military unit, raised for Loyalist service during the American Revolutionary War. They were founded by Colonel Benjamin Thompson, later Count Rumford, in 1781. They were initially formed from the remnants of other British Loyalist units, including Black Loyalist soldiers. They were evacuated from New York and resettled in Saint John, New Brunswick, in July 1783. They were disbanded there in October.

== History ==
The King's American Dragoons were proposed in Great Britain, unique amongst other Loyalist militia regiments. They were proposed by Daniel Murray, the commander of the Wentworth's Volunteers independent cavalry unit. The Secretary of State for the Colonies, Lord Germain took the proposal to King George III, whom personally approved and encouraged their raising. The King's American Dragoons were raised in Colony of Massachusetts by General Timothy Ruggles.

The regiment primarily served on Long Island in 1782 and early 1783. While in Huntington, Thompson ordered the church dismantled to provide timber for the construction of Fort Golgotha. The burial ground was levelled for it, and the old tombstones used to build fireplaces, ovens, and floors. Before they left, Thompson ordered all the woods burnt. They were evacuated to Saint John, New Brunswick after the war and were disbanded in October 1783 by order of the King in August. Sir Guy Carleton wrote to the Prime Minister, Lord North detailing the King's order to disband the regiment, how it would be done and to expatriate all of their ordinance and weaponry back to Great Britain.
