= Ormond W. Wetmore =

Canadian politician

Lieutenant-Colonel Ormond W. Wetmore
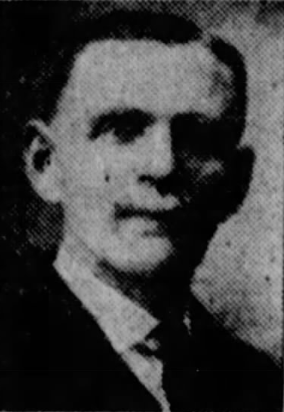

Member of the Legislative Assembly of New Brunswick
- In office 1921–1925 Serving with Hedley V. Dickson, James D. McKenna, George Burpee Jones
- Constituency: Kings County

Personal details
- Born: May 12, 1868 Clifton, New Brunswick
- Died: November 21, 1930 (aged 62) Clifton, New Brunswick
- Party: New Brunswick Liberal Association
- Spouse: Ellen B. Gorham (m. 1895)
- Children: three
- Occupation: farmer

Ormond Walker Wetmore (May 12, 1868 – November 21, 1930) was a Canadian politician. He served in the Legislative Assembly of New Brunswick from 1921 to 1925 as member of the Liberal party. He was a lieutenant colonel with the 74th Brunswick Rangers, retiring in 1916. He died in 1930, aged 62.
