= Grand Harbour Lighthouse =

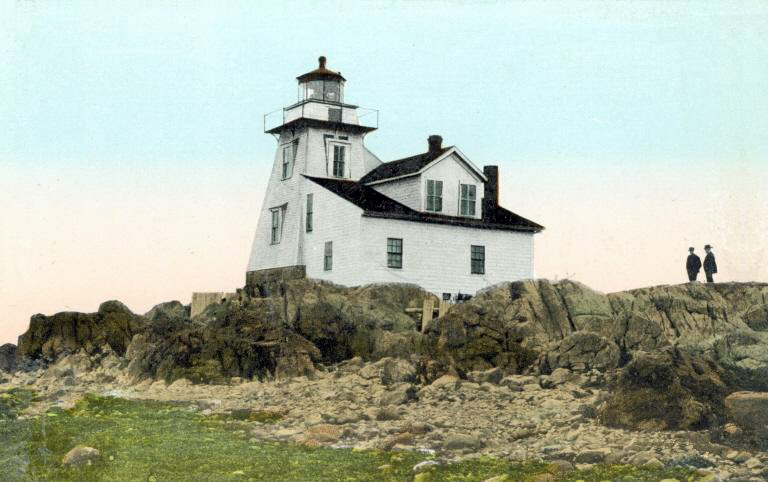
- The lighthouse and attached keeper's house in 1910
- Location: Ross Island, Grand Harbour, New Brunswick
- Coordinates: 44°40′00.8″N 66°44′57.0″W

Tower
- Constructed: 1879
- Construction: wood
- Height: 32 feet (9.8 m)
- Shape: square pyramidal tower

Light
- First lit: 1879
- Deactivated: 1963
- Focal height: 40 feet (12 m)
- Lens: catoptric
- Range: 11 miles (18 km)
- Characteristic: fixed white

The Grand Harbour Lighthouse was a Canadian lighthouse marking the entrance to Grand Harbour, Grand Manan, New Brunswick. It was built and first lit in 1879 and was decommissioned in 1963. It was severely damaged in the Groundhog Day gale of 1976 and destroyed by a gale in November 2013.

The lighthouse was built in 1879 at Fish Fluke Point on Ross Island, a tidal island that forms the eastern shore of Grand Harbour on Grand Manan island in the Bay of Fundy. Construction cost $1,050, in addition to $150 for the land on which it was built. The square wooden tower had an attached dwelling for the light keeper's family. The lighthouse was equipped with a catoptric lens and was lit for the first time on 10 October 1879. The fixed white light was visible for up to 11 miles (18 km).

The lighthouse was decommissioned after a light was installed on the breakwater at Ingalls Head, at the entrance to Grand Harbour opposite Ross Island. The last keeper left in August 1963 and the building was abandoned. It was severely damaged during the Groundhog Day gale in February 1976 and continued to deteriorate until it was declared "North America's most endangered lighthouse" by Lighthouse Digest in 1999.

The lighthouse, along with the whole of Ross Island, which is uninhabited, had been purchased by an American businessman in 1984. An effort spearheaded by Lighthouse Digest to raise enough money to save the building, in which the owner undertook to match funds donated by the public in 60 days, was unsuccessful. The building finally collapsed during a gale on 19 November 2013.
