= George Dixon Street =

Canadian politician

George Dixon Street (October 8, 1812– 1882) was a lawyer, judge and political figure in New Brunswick. He represented Charlotte in the Legislative Assembly of New Brunswick from 1856 to 1857.

He was born in Calcutta, India, the son of Thomas George Street, who was the son of Samuel Denny Street, and was educated in England and St. Andrews, New Brunswick. Street studied law, was called to the bar in 1835 and set up practice in St. Andrews. In 1840, he was named registrar of probates and, in 1866, probate judge. Street was president of the Charlotte county bank and a director of the New Brunswick and Canada railway. In 1835, he married Susan, the daughter of Thomas Wyer.
