= Charles Dixon (judge) =

Canadian politician

Charles Dixon (March 8, 1730 or 1731 – August 21, 1817) was an English-born farmer, merchant, judge and political figure in New Brunswick. He represented Westmorland in the 1st New Brunswick Legislative Assembly.

He was born in Kirklevington, the son of Charles Dixon and Mary Corps, and apprenticed with his father as a bricklayer. He pursued this trade at Yarm and then bought a paper factory at Hutton Rudby which he operated until 1771. Dixon married Susanna Coates in 1763. Originally a member of the Church of England, he converted to Methodism in 1765. In 1772, he emigrated with his family to Nova Scotia, arriving at Halifax and then moving to Fort Cumberland soon afterwards. Dixon purchased a farm at Sackville, also operating a small retail business. In 1776, he was named a justice of the peace and a judge in the Inferior Court of Common Pleas. Dixon became a customs collector at Sackville in 1784. He also served as highway commissioner, highway surveyor, assessor and overseer of the poor for Westmorland County. He died at his home in Sackville.
