= Loyalist Burial Ground =

Historic cemetery in Saint John, New Brunswick

- Interactive map of Loyalist Burial Ground

Details
- Established: 1783
- Location: Saint John, New Brunswick
- Country: Canada
- Coordinates: 45°16′29″N 66°03′23″W
- Find a Grave: Loyalist Burial Ground

The Loyalist Burial Ground, formerly known as the Old Burial Ground, is a historic cemetery and urban park in Saint John, New Brunswick. It was originally established following Loyalist arrival in 1783, with its oldest headstone dating back to July 13, 1784, following the death of Conradt Hendricks. It is located next to King's Square, another urban park in the city.

Following the death of K. C. Irving in 1992, the Irving family attempted to initiate plans to erect a statue in the cemetery to commemorate him the following year; it was called off after residents made complaints opposing the plans. Irving later contributed towards restoring the cemetery, which was re-opened in August 1995.

== Notable Burials ==
- James Putnam
- Edward Sands
- Mather Byles
- Jonathan Bliss
