= Moses Gerrish =

United Empire Loyalist (1744–1830)

Moses Gerrish UE
- Born: 10 June 1744; Byfield Parish, Newbury, Massachusetts
- Died: 30 July 1830 (aged 86); Grand Manan, Canada
- Occupations: teacher, justice of the peace, customs officer
- Known for: founding settler of Grand Manan
- Spouse: Ruth Ingalls

Moses Gerrish was a United Empire Loyalist and one of the original settlers of the island of Grand Manan.

== Early life and Revolutionary War activities ==
He was born in Byfield parish, Newbury, Massachusetts in 1744. He attended Harvard College, graduating in 1762 with a Bachelor of Arts degree, and became a school teacher. At the outbreak of the American Revolutionary War he took up residence in Lancaster, Massachusetts where his family owned land. He supported the British in the conflict and was arrested along with his brother in June 1777 on charges of being "dangerous persons to this and the other United States of America". Moses Gerrish had been circulating counterfeit money printed by the British in an effort to deflate the American currency's value. The family's property was confiscated and the brothers were imprisoned for one year.

Gerrish joined the British forces as an officer in the commissary department at Fort George, which was built in 1779 at the mouth of the Penobscot River at Castine, Maine. He stayed at Fort George until the British forces were evacuated at the end of the Revolutionary War.

== Grand Manan ==
As a member of the Penobscot Associated Loyalists, Gerrish was given land in Charlotte County, New Brunswick on Oak Bay near St. Andrews. However, he chose to found a settlement on Grand Manan, an uninhabited island in the Bay of Fundy. A license signed by the governor of Nova Scotia on 30 December 1783 gave Gerrish and four other Loyalists, "and others, being fifty families" the right to "occupy during pleasure the Island of Grand Manan and the small Islands adjacent in the fishery, with liberty of cutting frame Stuff and timber for building". Gerrish and the other licensees hoped to receive a grant to the entire island if they succeeded in attracting fifty families to the island in seven years, but they were not able to achieve this goal.

The first settlers, including Gerrish, arrived on Grand Manan on 6 May 1784. They landed on a tidal island originally called Harbour Island, and adjacent to the present-day community of Grand Harbour. The name was later changed to Ross Island after Thomas Ross, a sea captain who was one of the five licensees. Both Gerrish and Ross made their homes on Ross Island.

Gerrish performed the administrative work of the island. He was a justice of the peace and a customs officer, and had a license to perform marriages. In 1796 he was "implicated" as part of a smuggling ring along with Nathan Frink and others.

He and Ross continued in their efforts to attract settlers, with Gerrish assigning lots of land to new arrivals. These grants were unofficial, however, as the licensees did not own the land themselves. In 1804 the government of New Brunswick sent a surveyor to Grand Manan to report on conditions and in 1806 the government, in response to a petition by Gerrish, confirmed the de facto ownership of occupied lands and formalized the procedure for future land grants.

Gerrish died by drowning in 1830 when his boat capsized as he was returning home from performing a marriage ceremony at the village of Seal Cove. Years earlier he had indicated his desire to be buried on a lonely spot on Ross Island, where he was then buried - and his grave became overgrown and neglected.
