= C. Weldon Lawrence =

Canadian politician

C. Weldon Lawrence (April 15, 1926 – January, 2000) was a Canadian politician in the Province of New Brunswick. He was born at Dumfries in York County. He served in the Canadian Infantry Corps.

From 1950 to 1954, Weldon Lawrence served on the county council for the Parish of Dumfries. In the 1952 New Brunswick general election, he was elected to the Legislative Assembly as a Progressive Conservative Party candidate in the multi-member riding of York County. He was returned to office in the elections of 1956, 1960, and 1963. After fifteen years as an Assembly member, he did not seek reelection in 1967.

Weldon Lawrence was married to Jean Pike (1934–1971). They are buried together in the Prince William Cemetery.

Legislative Assembly of New Brunswick
Preceded by Henry C. Greenlaw	MLA for York County; 1952–1970	Succeeded by Carl Mooers
