= James Putnam (Nova Scotia politician) =

Canadian politician

James Putnam (November 16, 1756 – March 2, 1838) was a political figure in Nova Scotia. He was one of the first two representatives for Sydney County in the Legislative Assembly of Nova Scotia, serving from 1785 to 1793.

Putnam was born in Worcester, Massachusetts, the son of judge James Putnam and Elizabeth Chandler. Putnam was educated at Harvard University. He was an officer in the Associated Loyalists of Boston and came to Halifax in 1776. Putnam later went to England, where he was a barracks master and member of the commissary for the British Army. He was also a member of the household of the Duke of Kent. He died in England at the age of 81.
