= James Putnam (judge) =

New Brunswick politician and judge

James Putnam (1725 – October 23, 1789) was a judge and political figure in New Brunswick. He served as a member of New Brunswick's first Council.

Putnam was born in Salem, Massachusetts, was educated at Harvard University and studied law with chief justice Edmund Trowbridge. In 1749, he set up practice in Worcester, Massachusetts. He married Elizabeth Chandler in 1754. Putnam succeeded Trowbridge as Attorney General for Massachusetts. John Adams studied law with Putnam. At the start of the American Revolution, Putnam left with the British army for New York and later went to Halifax, finally settling in Saint John, New Brunswick. He was proscribed in the Massachusetts Banishment Act of 1778. He was named to the province's Council in 1783 and served as a judge in the Supreme Court of New Brunswick until his death at the age of 64. He is buried at the Loyalist Burial Ground in Saint John.

His son James served in the Nova Scotia assembly.
