= James William Nowlan =

Canadian politician

MLA for King's County
- In office 1873 to 1874

Personal details
- Born: November 4, 1818 King's County, New Brunswick
- Died: March 26, 1900 (aged 81)
- Party: Liberal Party of New Brunswick

James William Nowlan (November 4, 1818 – March 26, 1900) was a political figure in New Brunswick, Canada. He represented King's County in the Legislative Assembly of New Brunswick from 1873 to 1874 as a Liberal member.

He was born in King's County, the son of James Nowlan, an Irish immigrant, and the former Miss Crawford. Nowlan was married at least three times, to Miriam Hayward, then Leah Gillis and later to Abigail Hayward, his first wife's sister. He was an unsuccessful candidate for a seat in the provincial assembly but was elected in an 1873 by-election held after George Otty was named to the bench. He died March 26, 1900.
