= Groundhog Day gale of 1976 =

Severe winter storm in North America

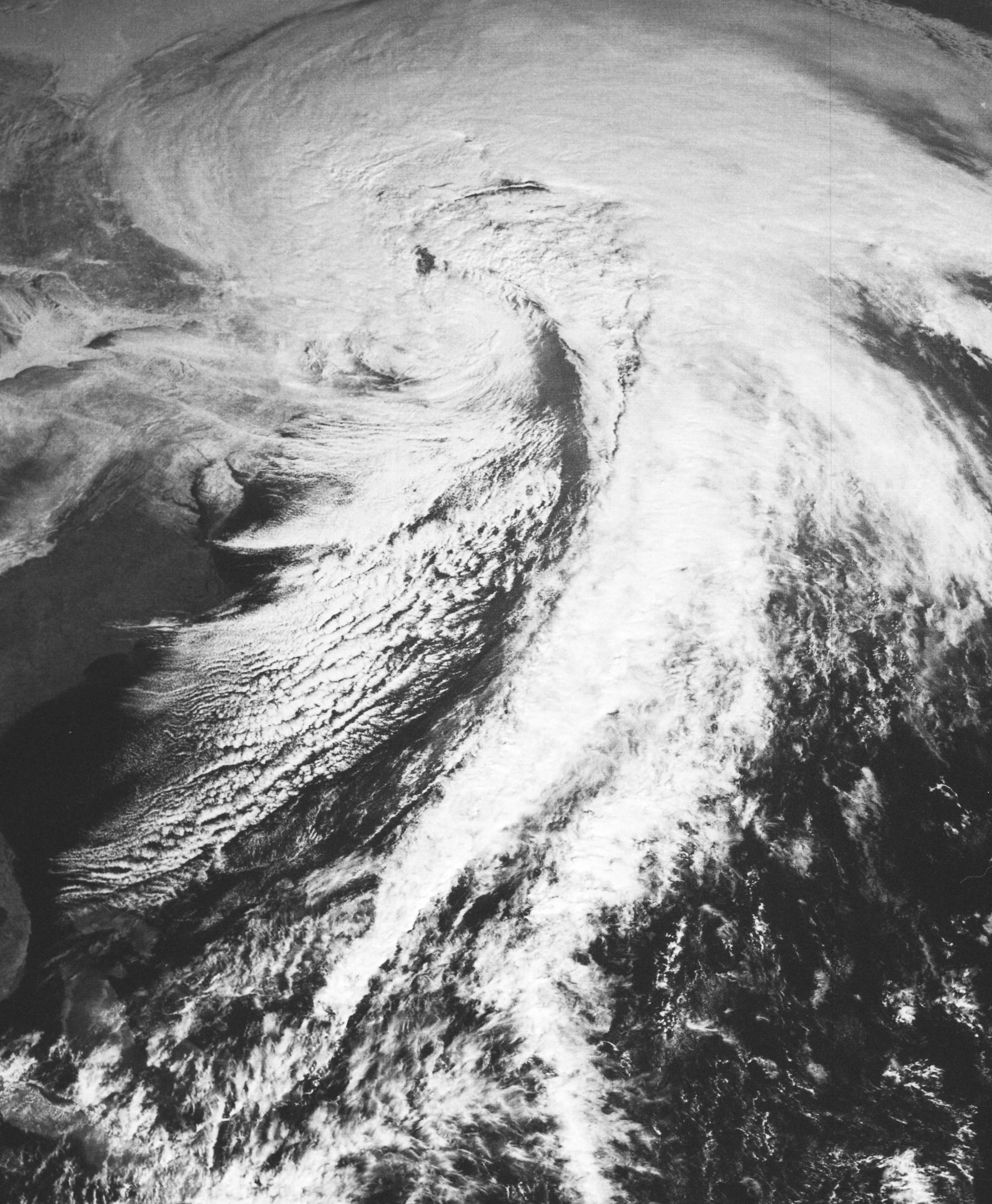
- Satellite imagery of the storm as it moved through New England on February 2

Meteorological history
- Formed: February 1, 1976
- Dissipated: February 5, 1976

Nor'easter blizzard
- Lowest pressure: 957 hPa (mbar); 28.26 inHg
- Max. snowfall: 56 inches (140 cm)

Overall effects
- Fatalities: 2
- Damage: $22 million USD
- Areas affected: New England and Atlantic Canada

The Groundhog Day gale was a severe winter storm that hit the Northeastern United States and southeastern Canada on February 2 (Groundhog Day), 1976.

== Meteorologist synopsis ==
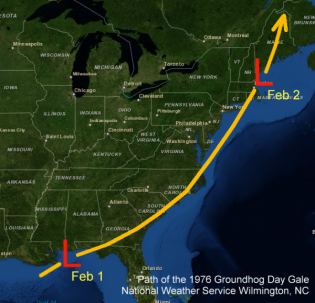
The storm track.

An upper-level low was stationary across the Desert Southwest of the United States, on January 28. A system in the northern branch of the Westerlies known as a Saskatchewan Screamer, similar to an Alberta clipper but originating as a frontal wave in the next Canadian province to the east, moved east-southeast across Canada beginning on January 30, luring the system in the United States eastward. The cyclones merged by February 2, becoming a significant storm over New England before lifting northward through Quebec into the Davis Strait. At this time, maximum sustained winds reached 164 kilometers per hour (102 mph) in coastal areas (equal to a Category 2 hurricane on the Saffir-Simpson hurricane scale), with wind gusts of up to 188 kilometers per hour (116 mph). By February 6, this extratropical cyclone was absorbed by another system in the northern Canadian archipelago.

== Effects in the United States ==
=== Maine ===
Caribou, Maine, recorded one of its lowest pressures on record, with much of New England recording its lowest values for the month of February, with a reading of 957.3 hectopascals (28.27 inHg). Winds gusted to 60 knots (69 mph) in Rockland and 100 knots (115 mph) at Southwest Harbor. Blizzard conditions were experienced for a few hours as the cyclone moved up into Canada. The storm caused extensive damage in many areas. Although many trees were blown down by the storm, many more were killed after large amounts of seawater were blown inland. Coastal flooding was seen from Brunswick to Eastport. A tidal surge went up the Penobscot River, flooding Bangor, Maine, for three hours around midday. At 11:15 am, waters began rising on the river and within 15 minutes had risen a total of 3.7 metres (12 ft) flooding downtown. About 200 cars were submerged and office workers were stranded until waters receded. There were no reported deaths during this unusual flash flood.

=== Massachusetts ===
Boston, Massachusetts, set their lowest February pressure on record, with a reading of 28.48 inches of mercury (964 hPa).

=== New York ===
Cyclonic flow and cold air around the backside of this system led to significant Lake effect snows for areas downwind of the Great Lakes.

=== Vermont ===
Burlington set a daily snow record on February 2 when 6.5 inches fell.

=== Elsewhere along the East Coast ===
The Robesonian newspaper of Lumberton, North Carolina, reported the drowning of a 20-year-old man in Lake Waccamaw. A person was hospitalized after their trailer overturned in Chadbourn, and a 45-foot boat ran aground on Wrightsville beach due to winds.

== Canada effects ==
Significant damage occurred in southern New Brunswick, especially to the city of Saint John. Saint John experienced winds of 188 km/h (116 mph). Southwest Nova Scotia and southern New Brunswick experienced coastal flooding of up to 1.6 meters (5 feet 3 inches) deep causing extensive damage to wharves, coastal buildings, boats and vessels. Power and communications lines were also knocked out. The tides along the coast were increased due to the convergence of anomalistic, synodical, and tropical monthly tidal cycles peaking simultaneously (known as Saros); a once in 18-year event. Damage was estimated in the tens of millions of dollars. Offshore New Brunswick, 12-m (39 ft) waves with swells of 10 metres (33 ft) were reported in the high seas. The decommissioned Grand Harbour Lighthouse at Fish Fluke Point on Grand Manan sustained extensive damage. The aftermath of this storm was worsened by a severe cold snap that followed the day after.

Campobello Island and Deer Island were located in the direct path of the gale and based on the tiny sizes of the islands, the salt spray that was carried up to 10 km inland meant that no area was sheltered from this phenomenon. Salt encrusted vehicles, building and vegetation all over these tiny islands.

A 30-year-old man from Saint John died after being swept away by floodwaters while attempting to secure a fishing hut on the Kennebecasis River in Rothesay, New Brunswick.

== See also ==
- Cyclogenesis
- Surface weather analysis
- Tide
