= Thomas Robison =

Canadian politician

Member of the Legislative Assembly of New Brunswick for York County
- In office 1908–1911
- Succeeded by: Oscar E. Morehouse

Personal details
- Born: 4 November 1856 Harvey, New Brunswick
- Died: 5 March 1911 (aged 54) Harvey, New Brunswick
- Party: Conservative
- Spouse: Frances Elkington

Thomas Robison (November 4, 1856 – March 5, 1911) was a Harvey, New Brunswick contractor and Conservative political figure. He was elected to the provincial legislature in the 1908, representing York County from 1908 to his death in 1911.

Among other buildings in Harvey, Robison built the Robison Hotel in 1905, initially with 26 rooms and expanding it to 48 rooms a few years later. His wife Frances continued to operate the hotel after his death until 1918, when she sold it to her brother-in-law Stephen (Allan) Robison. He operated the property until his death in February 1922, from which point his wife Catherine carried on until it was destroyed by fire on December 31, 1926.
