= Jeremiah Pote =

18th-century Massachusetts merchant

Jeremiah Pote was a leading merchant of Falmouth, Massachusetts (present-day Eastport, Maine) who owned a "hugely profitable shipyard" and several mills rising to prominence during the American Revolution where he was jailed multiple times. He was originally from Marblehead, Massachusetts.

== Life ==
Organising the Penobscot Loyalist evacuation with a handful of other prominent figures, Pote fled with the large group to settle in New Brunswick, Canada where he became a central planner for the development of Charlotte County.

In 1774, John Adams wrote to Abigail Adams that he had learned of a dispute between Captain Pote and William Gardiner, during which Pote refused to sign an agreement boycotting British goods and "rail'd away at Boston Mobs, drowning tea and tarring Malcolm". In May 1777, Captain Pote fled to British North America in an open boat.

In the 1780s, Pote offered a supporting affidavit to his son-in-law Robert Pagan noting that as owner of 9/16ths of the Favourite schooner, he could confirm considerable financial loss. He built his home in St. Andrews, New Brunswick.

Jeremiah Pote had two daughters, Miriam was engaged to an unknown suitor but broke it off to marry Robert Pagan, and her sister Joanna was one of the wives of Thomas Wyer.

He died November 23 1796. Upon his death, he was not buried in a churchyard but on a lot he'd sold which became a graveyard for himself, his wife Elizabeth, their children, and three families he called friends, Thomas Wyer and wife Mary, Robert Pagan and wife Miriam, and Samuel Andrews and wife Hannah.

In July 1798, the son of his brother Gamaliel, also jamed Jeremiah, was sentenced to death for killing his own wife "in a fit of jealous anger" but died in prison.
