= George Leonard (New Brunswick) =

George Leonard (November 1742 – April 1, 1826) was a British Loyalist and Canadian farmer from New Brunswick who served as alderman and chamberlain of Saint John.

== Early life ==
George was born in Plymouth, Massachusetts, the son of Nathaniel Leonard and Priscilla Rogers. He became a merchant in Boston selling "corn and flour" and married Sarah Thatcher there in 1765.

== Revolutionary War and Legacy ==
During the American Revolutionary War, he was a Loyalist and first served under Lord Hugh Percy at the Battle at Lexington in April 1775. After the British evacuated Boston in 1775, he was taken with the British troops to Halifax, Canada, with the rest of his family. Leonard went on to participate in the British capture of New York City. He later commanded a fleet of ships which raided coastal towns in 1779.

In 1780, Leonard went to Britain to obtain compensation for his loyalist actions. After later falling out with British commanders after the 1782 defeat at Yorktown, VA, Leonard left the Revolutionary War. He settled in Parrtown (later Saint John) in 1783, and named a director. In 1786, he was named superintendent of trade and fisheries at Canso, Nova Scotia. He served as a member of the Council for New Brunswick, serving until his death at Sussex Vale at the age of 83. He was also lieutenant colonel for the Kings County militia and quartermaster for the provincial militia. He founded the Masonic lodge at Saint John.

His son George Leonard was a member of the provincial assembly.
