= Daniel McMaster =

Canadian politician

Daniel McMaster (ca 1754 – June 16, 1830) was a merchant and politician in New Brunswick. He represented Charlotte in the Legislative Assembly of New Brunswick from 1793 to 1795.

He was a merchant in Boston at the time of the American Revolution. McMaster went to Halifax in 1776, eventually settling in Saint Andrews, New Brunswick. He married Hannah Ann Andrews. McMaster died in St. Andrews at the age of 76.
