= Carl Mooers =

Canadian politician

Member of the Legislative Assembly of New Brunswick
- In office 1967–1974
- Constituency: York

Personal details
- Born: Carl Osborne Mooers; September 29, 1929 Fredericton, New Brunswick
- Died: January 24, 1994 (aged 64) Fredericton, New Brunswsick
- Party: Progressive Conservative Party of New Brunswick
- Spouse(s): Shirley Margaret Patstone; Marit Helgerud
- Children: 6
- Occupation: businessman

Carl Mooers (September 29, 1929 – January 24, 1994) was a businessman and political figure in New Brunswick, Canada. He represented York in the Legislative Assembly of New Brunswick from 1967 to 1974 as a Progressive Conservative member.

He was born in Fredericton, New Brunswick, the son of Wilmot F. Mooers and Lily E. Culliton. Mooers studied at a business college there. In 1949, he married Shirley Margaret Patstone. They gave birth to three children, Wilmot Fraser, Sheila Margaret and Carl Michael. The two were divorced and Carl's second wife was Marit Helgerud (from Norway). They also had three children, sons; Arne Oyvind, Erik Andreas and Morten Magnus.

Mooers served in the province's Executive Council as Minister of Supply and Services from 1972 to 1974. He owned Treeland, Hayland (lumber and mill) and was the builder/owner of the province's first Mercedes dealership, among other ventures.

Mooers died in January 1994.
