= Harry Ames =

Canadian politician

Harry Ames (January 14, 1896 – December 14, 1973) was a lumberman and political figure in New Brunswick, Canada.

== Biography ==
He represented York County in the Legislative Assembly of New Brunswick, as a Progressive Conservative member, from 1952 to his death in 1973.

He was born in Redditch, England, the son of Arthur Ames. He was educated in England and then, after coming to Canada in 1905, at Scotch Settlement. In 1924, he married Annie May Wilson (1901–1984).

Legislative Assembly of New Brunswick
Preceded by Harry A. Corey	MLA for York County; 1844-1952	Succeeded by David Bishop
