= William Hubbard (New Brunswick politician) =

Canadian politician

William Hubbard (1751–1813) was a farmer, lawyer, judge and political figure in New Brunswick. He represented Sunbury in the Legislative Assembly of New Brunswick from 1785 to 1792.

He was the son of Nathaniel Hubbard and Mary Quintard. Hubbard, a United Empire Loyalist, came to New Brunswick from Stamford, Connecticut in 1783. He settled in Burton, Sunbury County. Hubbard was registrar of deeds and wills and chief justice for the Court of Common Pleas in Sunbury County. He married Benjamina W. Clarke.

His daughter Jane Isabella married John Ambrose Street. His grandson Jeremiah Smith Boies De Veber served in the Canadian House of Commons.
