= Walter Scovil =

Canadian politician

Walter Bates Scovil (November 2, 1823 – May 30, 1903) was a farmer and political figure in New Brunswick. He represented King's in the Legislative Assembly of New Brunswick from 1856 to 1866.

He was born in Springfield, New Brunswick, the son of Edward George Nichols Scovil and Mary Lucretia Bates, and was educated in Kingston, New Brunswick. In 1854, he married Charlotte Amelia Hewlett. Scovil later served as federal inspector of weights and measures for several counties in New Brunswick, serving in that post for 15 years. He died in Springfield.
