= William Hayden Needham =

Canadian politician

William Hayden Needham (December 9, 1810 – September 29, 1874) was a Canadian lawyer and political figure in New Brunswick. He represented the City of Saint John from 1850 to 1854 and York County from 1865 to 1866 and from 1869 to 1870 in the Legislative Assembly of New Brunswick.

He was born in Fredericton, New Brunswick, the son of Mark D. Needham, and was educated at King's College (later the University of New Brunswick). He studied law with George Frederick Street, was called to the bar in 1834 and practiced in Woodstock, Fredericton, and Saint John. Needham married Mary Ann Gale in 1835. He was elected mayor of Fredericton six times between 1856 and 1868. He was elected in 1865, defeated in 1866 and then reelected in an 1869 by-election. He ran unsuccessfully for reelection in 1870 and 1874. In 1873, he was named Queen's Counsel.

Needham died in Woodstock at the age of 63.
