= Wrightsville =

Wrightsville is the name of some places in the United States:

- Wrightsville, Arkansas
- Wrightsville, Georgia
- Wrightsville, Missouri
- Wrightsville, Adams County, Ohio
- Wrightsville, Madison County, Ohio
- Wrightsville, New Jersey
- Wrightsville, Pennsylvania
- Wrightsville, Wisconsin, a ghost town
- Wrightsville Beach, North Carolina
- Wrightsville, a recurring fictional New England small town in the novels of Ellery Queen
