= George Ryan (Canadian politician) =

Canadian politician

Member of the Canada Parliament for King's
- In office 1850–1856
- In office 1861–1865
- In office 1866–1866

George Ryan (August 12, 1806 – February 5, 1876) was a New Brunswick farmer and political figure. He represented King's in the 1st Canadian Parliament as a Liberal member.

He was born in Pointe de Bute, New Brunswick in 1806, the son of James Ryan, and moved to Studholm in Kings County with his family in 1814. In 1827, he married Miriam, the daughter of Samuel Freeze, a former member of the provincial assembly. Ryan represented Kings in the Legislative Assembly of New Brunswick from 1850 to 1856, from 1861 to 1865 and in 1866; he was elected to the same seat in the House of Commons following Confederation.

1867 Canadian federal election: King's
Party	Candidate	Votes	Elected
Liberal	George Ryan	1,303	✓
Unknown	George Otty	1,083	
Source: Canadian Elections Database
