= Gabriel Flewelling =

Canadian politician

G. Hudson Flewelling

MLA for Kings County
- In office 1882 to 1886

Personal details
- Born: May 13, 1842 Clifton, New Brunswick
- Died: May 9, 1922 (aged 79) Kingston, New Brunswick
- Party: Liberal-Conservative

Gabriel Hudson Flewelling (May 13, 1842 – May 9, 1922) was a merchant, shipbuilder and political figure in New Brunswick, Canada. He represented King's County in the Legislative Assembly of New Brunswick from 1882 to 1886 as a Liberal-Conservative member. Born in Clifton, the son of William P. Flewelling he married, in 1863, Augusta Whelpley. Flewelling was also a captain in the local militia and an auditor for King's County. He ran unsuccessfully for a seat in the provincial assembly in 1878 and was first elected in an 1882 by-election held after the death of John Herbert Crawford. In 1886, he was named to the Legislative Council. Some historians have said he had roots in Wales, where his family may have immigrated from. In fact, the Flewelling's/Flewwelling's had not been in Wales for at least three centuries before his birth, and Gabriel's great grandfather (Enos Flewelling) and great-great grandfather (Thomas Flewelling) were Loyalists in the American Revolution, from what was then North Castle, Westchester Co., New York. Flewelling had a brother, William, who was the deputy surveyor general of New Brunswick. On May 5, 1908, while Flewelling was staying at his brother's house, William died by a self-inflicted gunshot wound.

He died on May 9, 1922.
