= Ninian Lindsay =

Canadian politician

Ninian Lindsay (1753 – February 25, 1828) was an Irish-born political figure in New Brunswick. He represented Charlotte in the Legislative Assembly of New Brunswick from 1802 to 1809.

Lindsay's uncle was the Archbishop of Dublin for the Church of Ireland, and Lindsay migrated to Philadelphia to live with another uncle.

Lindsay came to New Brunswick around 1786, settling at St. Stephen in Charlotte County. He married Hannah Marks, daughter of Captain Nehemiah Marks.

In 1803, Col. Hugh Mackay wrote to Colonel Edward Winslow, noting "between you and me, peace and tranquility will never be effectually established in this County while Robert Pagan, Nathan Frink and Ninian Lindsay are continued on the Commission of the Peace. The two latter the real incendiaries - indeed from teh violent conduct of all three, both at home and abroad, they have forfeited all claim to the least indulgence from Government.
