= Daniel Lyman (loyalist) =

Canadian politician

Daniel Lyman (July 13, 1753 – November 3, 1809) was a political figure in New Brunswick. He represented York in the Legislative Assembly of New Brunswick from 1785 to 1792.

He was born in New Haven, Connecticut, the son of Deacon Daniel Lyman, and was educated at Yale College, graduating in 1770. Lyman married Statira Camp in 1773. He served with the Prince of Wales's American Volunteers during the American Revolution, first as captain and later as major. After the war, Lyman settled in New Brunswick. He leased a farm on the Nashwaak River from Benedict Arnold. He later moved to England and died at home in Piccadilly, London at the age of 55.
