= Ebenezer Foster =

Canadian politician

Ebenezer Foster (– before 1792) was a judge in New Jersey and political figure in New Brunswick. He represented King's in the Legislative Assembly of New Brunswick from 1785 until his death in office.

In New Jersey, he had served as a justice of the peace, a judge for the Court of oyer and terminer and a judge in the Court of Common Pleas for Middlesex County and as a school trustee for Woodbridge Township. Sometime around 1776, Foster was arrested as a British sympathizer; he was freed by the British in December of that year. He left Staten Island for Nova Scotia in 1783 and later settled in Kingston Parish, Kings County, New Brunswick.
