= George Otty =

Canadian politician

George Otty (August 8, 1820 – November 14, 1888) was a lawyer, judge and political figure in New Brunswick, Canada. He represented King's County in the Legislative Assembly of New Brunswick from 1865 to 1866 and from 1870 to 1873.

He was born and was educated in Saint John, New Brunswick, the son of Allan Otty and Elizabeth Crookshank. He studied law, was called to the bar in 1841 and set up practice in Saint John, moving to Hampton in 1849. In 1840, he married Elizabeth, the daughter of doctor Sylvester Zobieski Earle. Otty opposed Confederation. In 1873, he was named probate judge for King's County. He also served as secretary-treasurer for King's County.

== Electoral record ==
1867 Canadian federal election: King's
Party	Candidate	Votes	Elected
Liberal	George Ryan	1,303	✓
Unknown	George Otty	1,083	
Source: Canadian Elections Database
