= Hugh Mackay (New Brunswick politician, died 1848) =

Canadian politician

Hugh Mackay (ca 1751 – January 28, 1848) was a judge and political figure in New Brunswick, Canada. He represented Charlotte County in the Legislative Assembly of New Brunswick from 1793 to 1795, 1802-1809 and 1817–1830.

Mackay served in the loyalist forces during the American Revolution, afterwards settling in St. George, New Brunswick. He served as a colonel in the Charlotte County Militia there and was senior judge in the Court of Common Pleas for . Mackay died at the age of 97.

In 1803, Col. Hugh Mackay wrote to Colonel Edward Winslow, noting "between you and me, peace and tranquility will never be effectually established in this County while Robert Pagan, Nathan Frink and Ninian Lindsay are continued on the Commission of the Peace. The two latter the real incendiaries - indeed from the violent conduct of all three, both at home and abroad, they have forfeited all claim to the least indulgence from Government.

In 1818, when the provincial parliament was dissolved over the issue of timber duties, Robert Pagan, Colin Campbell, Hugh Mackay and Joseph Porter were elected members of Assembly for Charlotte County.

Military Service: Queen's Rangers, May 21, 1778

== Death ==
He died on January 28, 1848, in the Parish of Saint George in the County of Charlotte and province of New Brunswick. He was buried at the St. Mark's Cemetery in St. George. His tombstone epitaph reads:

"Sacred to the Memory of Hugh MacKay Esq.
Late of Suther Hall St. George.
Who Departed this Life 28th January A. D. 1848 in the 97th Year of his Age.
He was a Native of Sutherlandshire Scotland.
Served during the American Revolutionary War as an Officer in the Queen’s American Rangers Regiment of Foot.
And was for many Years Colonel of the Charlotte County Militia.
And was Leading Member in the House of Assembly of the Province for the said County."
