= Hedley V. Dickson =

Canadian politician (1858–1942)

Member of the Legislative Assembly of New Brunswick
- In office 1912–1930
- Constituency: Kings

Personal details
- Born: March 3, 1858 Jubilee, New Brunswick
- Died: April 24, 1942 (aged 84) Hammond River, New Brunswick
- Party: Conservative Party of New Brunswick
- Spouse: Emily L. Frost
- Children: seven
- Occupation: Farmer

Hedley Vicars Dickson (March 3, 1858 – April 24, 1942) was a Canadian politician. He served in the Legislative Assembly of New Brunswick as member of the Conservative party representing Kings County from 1912 to 1930.
