= William P. Flewelling =

Canadian politician (1814–1875)

MLA for Kings County
- In office 1866 to 1870

Personal details
- Born: August 10, 1814 Kingston, New Brunswick
- Died: March 6, 1875 (aged 60) New Brunswick, Canada

William Puddington Flewelling (August 10, 1814 – March 3, 1875) was a ship builder and political figure in New Brunswick, Canada. He represented King's County in the Legislative Assembly of New Brunswick from 1866 to 1870.

He was born in Kingston, New Brunswick, of Welsh and Scottish descent, and educated there. In 1835, he married Susannah Wetmore. He married Esther A. Merritt in 1839 following his first wife's death and Charlotte Whelpley after his second wife died in 1854. Flewelling was lieutenant colonel in the county militia. He was named to the Executive Council of New Brunswick in 1867, serving as Surveyor General from February 13, 1869 to October 1870.

Flewelling died in 1875. His son Gabriel later served in the provincial assembly. His other son, William P. Flewelling, was the deputy surveyor general of New Brunswick.
