= Thomas Wyer Jr. =

Canadian politician

Thomas Wyer Jr. (1789 – December 23, 1848) was a political figure in New Brunswick. He represented Charlotte in the Legislative Assembly of New Brunswick from 1827 to 1840.

== Life ==
He was the son of Thomas Wyer Sr., a United Empire Loyalist who came to St. Andrews, New Brunswick from Falmouth (later Portland, Maine), and Joanna Pote daughter of Jeremiah Pote. The elder Wyer was the owner of the schooner Miriam and son of the sea captain David Wyer.

In 1837, he was involved in the incorporation of the Campobello Mill and Manufacturing Company. In 1839 he was appointed commissioner of ensuring mail delivery to the Fundy Isles.

As of 1839-1842, Wyer was one of three commissioners of the lighthouses on Machias Seal Island, Campobello and at Saint Andrews.

Wyer served as a justice in the Court of Common Pleas, as a lieutenant in the militia, as commissioner of wrecks and as a member of the board of education. In 1840, Wyer was named to the Legislative Council of New Brunswick.

His daughter Susan married George Dixon Street, who also represented Charlotte in the assembly.
