= Sylvester Zobieski Earle Sr. =

Canadian politician (1791–1879)

Sylvester Zobieski Earle Sr. (1791 – December 4, 1879) was a Canadian medical doctor and political figure in New Brunswick. He represented King's County in the Legislative Assembly of New Brunswick from 1843 to 1850 and from 1856 to 1857.

He was born in Queens County, New Brunswick, and studied medicine in New York. Earle married Maria Hughson and returned to Kings County, New Brunswick. He died at Hampton.

His son Sylvester Zobieski Earle was mayor of Saint John.
