= Daniel Hanington =

Canadian politician

Daniel Hanington (1804 – May 5, 1889) was a farmer, mill owner and political figure in the Province of New Brunswick, Canada. He represented Westmorland County in the Legislative Assembly of New Brunswick from 1834 to 1862.

He was born at Shediac, New Brunswick, the son of William Hanington, one of the first English settlers on Shediac Bay, and was educated in Sackville. Hanington became a justice of the peace and a lieutenant colonel in the county militia. In 1831, he married Margaret, the daughter of William Peters, a former member of the legislative assembly. Hanington served for many years as the customs controller for the port of Shediac. He was speaker for the legislative assembly from March 1853 to 1856. He served as a member of the Executive Council from 1848 to 1851 and was named to the Legislative Council in 1867.
