= George Stilman Hill =

Canadian politician

MLA for Charlotte
- In office 1831 to 1846

Personal details
- Born: April 10, 1794 Milltown, New Brunswick
- Died: April 13, 1858 (aged 64) Fredericton, New Brunswick

George Stilman Hill (April 10, 1794 – April 13, 1858) was a lawyer and political figure in New Brunswick. He represented Charlotte in the Legislative Assembly of New Brunswick from 1831 to 1846.

Born in Milltown, New Brunswick, the son of Abner Hill, an American-born emigrant to New Brunswick, and Mary Whitney, he was educated at Dartmouth College in New England and went on to study law with Ward Chipman. Hill practised law in St. Stephen. He married Sarah Upton. Hill was named to the Legislative Council of New Brunswick in 1850. He died in office in Fredericton.

His son was George Frederick Hill, who also served on the Legislative Council of New Brunswick.

His former home at 90 King Street, St. Stephen was referred to as the Hill Home referencing both George and Arthur, and is a registered local historic place in St. Stephen.
