= Jacob Ellegood =

Canadian politician

Jacob Ellegood (1742–1801) was a farmer and political figure in New Brunswick. He represented York County in the Legislative Assembly of New Brunswick from 1793 to 1801.

Owning two plantations in Virginia, he was also born there. Ellegood was a justice of the peace and a colonel in the local militia. He married Mary Saunders, the sister of Chief Justice of New Brunswick, John Saunders. Ellegood supported the British governor and raised a loyalist regiment but was taken prisoner in 1776. At the end of the American Revolutionary War, he received a land grant on the Saint John River where he settled with his family. Ellegood purchased Benedict Arnold's property at Fredericton when Arnold departed from the colony. He was named a magistrate and supervised road building in the area. He died on his property in 1801. He held a number of slaves, which he gave to his sons and one granddaughter upon his death.

The Elligood (1794 ship) may have been named for him.
