= Edward Sands (politician) =

Canadian politician (c. 1760 – 1803)

Member of the Legislative Assembly of New Brunswick
- In office 1793–1795
- Constituency: Saint John
- In office 1802–1803

Personal details
- Born: c. 1760
- Died: 1803 Saint John, New Brunswick
- Resting place: Loyalist Burial Ground, Saint John
- Occupation: Politician

Edward Sands (ca. 1760 – 1803) was a politician in New Brunswick. He represented St. John in the Legislative Assembly of New Brunswick from 1793 to 1795 and from 1802 to 1803.

== Career ==
He served in the British Army during the American Revolution and retired on half pay to New Brunswick after the war, settling in Saint John. Sands served on the city council and was coroner for the city and county. He was reelected to the assembly in 1802 but his election was appealed and declared invalid the following year.

== Death ==
Sands died in Saint John at the age of 43 later that same year. He is buried at the Loyalist Burial Ground in Saint John.
