= Robert Pagan =

Canadian politician

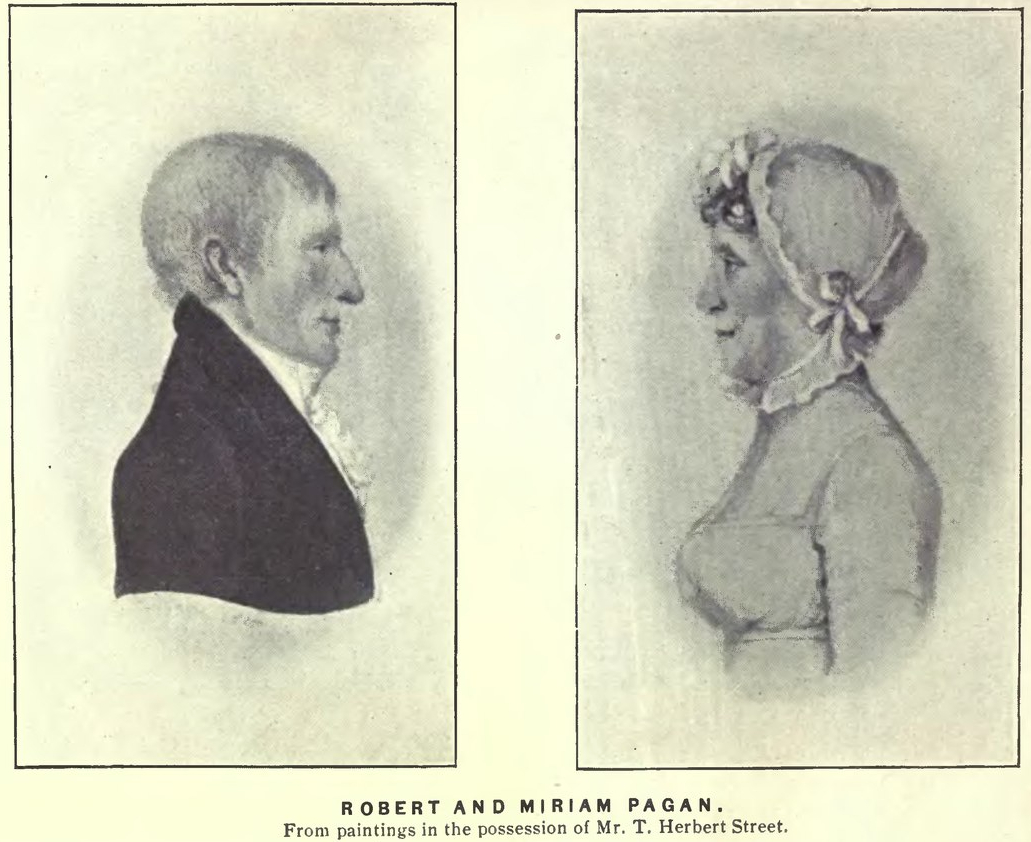
Paintings of Robert Pagan, and his wife Miriam

Robert Pagan (November 16, 1750 – November 23, 1821) was a Scottish-born merchant, judge and political figure in New Brunswick, Canada. He represented Charlotte County in the Legislative Assembly of New Brunswick from 1786 to 1819.

He was born in Glasgow, the son of William Pagan and Margaret Maxwell. In 1768 or 1769, he went to Falmouth Neck, Massachusetts (now Portland, Maine), where he became involved in the timber trade and ship building.

In October 1775, his premises were destroyed by American forces who were reacting to rebel activity in the area. In early 1776 Pagan and his brother Thomas brothers departed to the Barbadoes, as the schooner Favourite chiefly owned by Pagan set sail in January, and in February the Brig Falmouth in February although it was seized entering Bridgetown.

They returned in 1777, joining their brother William in New York City.

Pagan was named in the Massachusetts Banishment Act of 1778.

Pagan married Miriam Pote, daughter of Captain Jeremiah Pote who was also the father-in-law to prominent local Thomas Dyer who would cooperate extensively with Pagan in the future.

== Life in New Brunswick ==
In 1780, Pagan settled at the mouth of the Penobscot River, believing that this would become a loyalist settlement, and established sawmills, stores and engaged in ship building. In 1784, learning that the border would be established further east, he relocated to what would become Saint Andrews in the Passamaquoddy Bay. He was named a justice of the peace and a judge of the Inferior Court of Common Pleas for the county.

Pagan was involved in the timber trade, operating mills, shipbuilding and the fish trade and was a wholesale and retail merchant. In 1787 Thomas Carleton, the Lieutenant Governor of New Brunswick, appointed Pagan the first colonel in command of the Charlotte County Militia. He served as colonel until approximately 1808.

He assisted in research and surveys which helped establish the St. Croix River as the international boundary with Maine. Pagan swore a deposition that he had found the ruins of the fort, on the island.

In 1803, Col. Hugh Mackay wrote to Colonel Edward Winslow, noting "between you and me, peace and tranquility will never be effectually established in this County while Robert Pagan, Nathan Frink and Ninian Lindsay are continued on the Commission of the Peace. The two latter the real incendiaries - indeed from teh violent conduct of all three, both at home and abroad, they have forfeited all claim to the least indulgence from Government.

By 1815, Pagan was one of the twelve wealthiest men in the province.

In 1817, Pagan gave notice that he intended to resign as immigration commissioner for Charlotte County, New Brunswick specifically because there were too many American immigrants now outnumbering the local residents.

In 1818, when the provincial parliament was dissolved over the issue of timber duties, Robert Pagan, Colin Campbell, Hugh Mackay and Joseph Porter were elected members of Assembly for Charlotte County.

Pagan helped found the Bank of New Brunswick in 1820. The first Agricultural Society of New Brunswick was formed in St Andrews on January 11 1820, and speeches were given by Stubs, Robert Pagan, Dr. Henry Frye, Colon Campbell, H. Hatch and John Strang

He died in Saint Andrews in 1821 at the age of 71. He declared on his deathbed that he wished for no debtor owing monies to his estate to be imprisoned, forgiving any what they could not pay.
