= Archibald McLean (d. 1830) =

Canadian politician

Archibald McLean (c. 1753 – February 18, 1830) was a Scottish-born political figure in New Brunswick. He represented York in the Legislative Assembly of New Brunswick from 1793 to 1809.

== Biography ==
He was born on the Isle of Mull, the son of Hector McLean. In 1777, he became an ensign in the New York Volunteers, serving during the American Revolution and reaching the rank of captain before being placed on half pay in 1783. McLean settled on the Nashwaak River in New Brunswick. He served as a justice of the peace. McLean was married twice: first to Prudence French and then to Susan Drummond. In 1810, he was named staff adjutant to Lieutenant-Colonel Joseph Gubbins, inspecting field officer for the New Brunswick militia. McLean took over this post in 1816 after Buggins left New Brunswick. He died in Nashwaak.
