= Samuel Freeze =

Canadian politician

Samuel Freeze (May 3, 1778 – April 4, 1844) was a farmer and political figure in New Brunswick. He represented King's County in the Legislative Assembly of New Brunswick in 1820, from 1828 to 1830 and from 1835 to 1844.

He was born in Cumberland County, Nova Scotia, the son of William Freeze and Martha Bulmer who came to New Brunswick from Yorkshire, England. Freeze married three times, first marrying Margaret Wells, then Bethia Wager and then Mary Jane Scott; he had 21 children. He died in office in King's County at the age of 65.

His son Samuel Nelson served as sheriff for King's County. His daughter Miriam married George Ryan, who served in the provincial assembly and the Canadian House of Commons.
