= Bradford Gilbert (politician) =

Canadian politician (c.1746–1814)

Bradford Gilbert (ca 1746 – 1814) was a merchant and political figure in New Brunswick. He represented St. John in the Legislative Assembly of New Brunswick from 1793 to 1809.

Originally from Freetown, Massachusetts, the son of Thomas Gilbert, he was proscribed and banished in 1778 as a loyalist. Gilbert settled in New Brunswick. He served as an alderman in Saint John and was a member of the St. John Loyal Artillery. He died in Saint John at the age of 68.
