= George Leonard Jr. =

Canadian politician (died 1818)

George Leonard (died October 14, 1818) was a lawyer and political figure in New Brunswick. He represented King's County in the Legislative Assembly of New Brunswick from 1803 to 1816.

He was the son of George Leonard and Sarah Thatcher and came to New Brunswick with his father in 1783. Leonard was an attorney in Saint John, New Brunswick, later settling in Sussex, New Brunswick where he and his father were granted land. He was reelected in 1810 after the results of the election in King's County were appealed because the sheriff had closed the polls too early. In 1818, he drowned after falling off a log while crossing a creek.
