= John Yeamans (politician) =

Canadian politician

John Yeamans (c.1735 – 1824) was a political figure in New Brunswick. He represented Queen's in the Legislative Assembly of New Brunswick from 1786 to 1816.

As a loyalist, he fled to New Brunswick from Dutchess County, New York in 1783. He was also named in an 1817 will created by his son.

Yeamans served as a magistrate for Queen's County until his death at the age of 89.
