= Daniel Murray (politician) =

Canadian politician

Daniel Murray (October 19, 1751 – February 24, 1832) was a judge and political figure in New Brunswick. He represented York in the Legislative Assembly of New Brunswick from 1785 to 1802.

Born in Rutland, Vermont, he was the son of Colonel John Murray, of Scottish descent, and his second wife Elizabeth McClanathan. He was educated at Harvard University, graduating in 1771.

After briefly establishing a legal practice in Brookline, Massachusetts, Murray served as a Major in the King's American Dragoons during the American Revolution, serving with his brothers Robert and John. Murray was named in the Massachusetts Banishment Act of 1778. He was a justice in the Inferior Court of Common Pleas for New Brunswick. Murray left New Brunswick in 1803 and returned to the United States. He died in Portland, Maine at the age of 80.
