= William Pagan (politician) =

Canadian politician (1744–1819)

William Pagan (1744 – March 12, 1819) was a Scottish-born merchant and political figure in New Brunswick. He represented Saint John County in the Legislative Assembly of New Brunswick from 1786 to 1816.

He was born in Glasgow, the son of William Pagan, a dealer in sugar, and Margaret Maxwell. By 1766, he was master of his own ship, involved in the sugar trade between the West Indies and North America. Pagan established a business in New York City and later joined his brothers Robert and Thomas, who were based in Massachusetts, in the business of trading timber for goods from Scotland and the West Indies. Later, the brothers settled east of the Penobscot River in what is now part of Maine, expecting that this area would become part of a loyalist colony. In 1783, when it became clear where the border would be established, Pagan settled in Saint John, New Brunswick. He established a firm involved in trading goods with Britain and was also involved in shipbuilding. He also served on the town council for Saint John. During the War of 1812, Pagan was a partner in operating privateer ships. He helped found St. Andrew's Church in Saint John and served as the first president of the local Saint Andrew's Society. He was a member of the New Brunswick Legislative Council from 1817 until his death in Saint John two years later; as a member of the Church of Scotland, Pagan was the first council member who did not belong to the Church of England.
