= 1987 New Brunswick general election =

Canadian provincial election

- October 13, 1987

58 seats of the Legislative Assembly of New Brunswick 30 seats needed for a majority
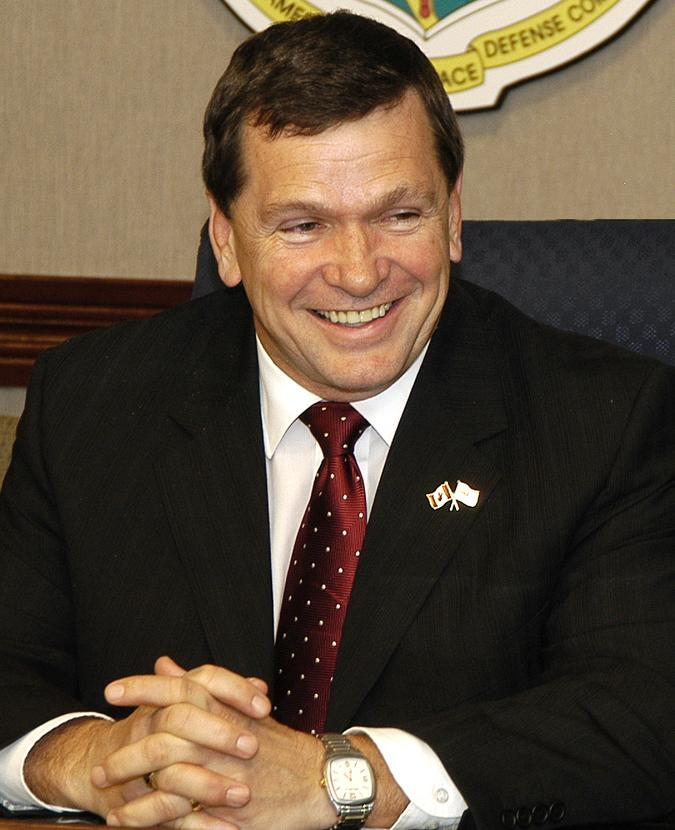
	First party	Second party	Third party
Leader	Frank McKenna	Richard Hatfield	George Little
Party	Liberal	Progressive Conservative	New Democratic
Leader since	1985	1967	1980
Leader's seat	Chatham	Carleton Centre (lost re-election)	Ran in Kings West (lost)
Last election	18	39	1
Seats won	58	0	0
Seat change	▲40	▼39	▼1
Popular vote	246,702	116,798	43,033
Percentage	60.39%	28.59%	10.55%
Swing	▲19.09%	▼18.86%	▲0.4%
- Popular vote by riding. As this is an FPTP election, seat totals are not determined by popular vote, but instead via results by each riding.
Premier before election
Richard Hatfield
Progressive Conservative
Premier after election
Frank McKenna
Liberal

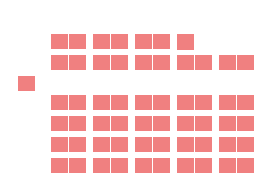
Rendition of party representation in the 51st New Brunswick Legislative Assembly decided by this election. Liberals (58)

The 1987 New Brunswick general election was held on October 13, 1987, to select the 58 members of the Legislative Assembly of New Brunswick of the 51st Legislature of the Canadian province of New Brunswick. The Liberal Party won power for the first time since 1967. They did so in a landslide, winning all 58 seats in the legislature. This feat was only accomplished one other time in Canadian history, in the 1935 Prince Edward Island election. These two elections were also two of only four in Canadian history, along with the 1935 Alberta election and the 2026 Quebec election, where a ruling party suffered a wipeout of all of their seats.

== Background ==
The popularity of Richard Hatfield, who had served as a popular premier from 1970 through the 1982 election, fell due to scandals in his last term. In 1984, during an official visit to New Brunswick by Queen Elizabeth II, Royal Canadian Mounted Police officers found marijuana in Hatfield's luggage. Hatfield was later acquitted of marijuana possession charges. As reported by the media, Hatfield was also alleged to have hosted parties with young men where illegal drugs were used. He was criticized by opposition parties and by the media for extravagant use of the government plane, which he used to travel to New York City where he visited night clubs, earning him the nickname "Disco Dick".

In 1985, three Saint John-area Progressive Conservative members of the legislature (MLAs) challenged Hatfield's leadership and led a brief caucus revolt after the Liberals won two by-elections in previously Tory seats, but Hatfield led the party through a fifth election.

== Campaign ==
Hoping to boost his popularity enough to avoid defeat, Hatfield delayed calling the election as long as possible. It was finally held on October 13, 1987, five years and a day since the last election—the longest allowed by the Constitution of Canada. The Tories lost all of their seats, and Hatfield himself lost his own seat to Liberal challenger Allison DeLong by 19 points. Taking full responsibility for the defeat, he announced his resignation the night of the election while being interviewed by media outside of his Hartland home. Tory supporters had crowded into Hatfield's home, but abandoned him early in the evening as the returns began to come in.

Frank McKenna's Liberals were virtually assured victory from day one, thanks to Hatfield's scandals. However, they ran a very successful campaign that enabled them to garner an unprecedented clean sweep of the legislature. The New Democrats also suffered a moral defeat, losing their one seat—something they had won for the first time in 1982.

== Opinion polls ==
=== During campaign ===
Evolution of voting intentions at provincial level
Polling firm	Last day of survey	Source	NBLA	NBPC	NBNDP	Other	ME	Sample
Election 1987	October 13, 1987		60.39	28.59	10.55	0.47		
Omnifacts	October 1987		62	26	12	—N/a	4.5	500
Baseline Research	September 30, 1987		65	25	10	—N/a	4.0	500
Canadian Facts	September 26, 1987		62	27	11	—N/a	2.8	1,245
Baseline Research	September 10, 1987		52	35	13	—N/a	4	545
Angus Reid	September 1987		67	22	10	—N/a	—N/a	—N/a
Omnifacts	July 1987		59	21	20	—N/a	4.3	700
Election 1982	October 12, 1982		41.3	47.45	10.2	1.05		

=== Edmundston by-election ===
Evolution of voting intentions at provincial level
Polling firm	Last day of survey	Source	NBLA	NBPC	NBNDP	ME	Sample
By-election 1986	February 10, 1986		63.25	32.38	4.36		
Baseline Research	January 31, 1986		58	33	9	5	300
Election 1982	October 12, 1982		40.24	53.09	6.67		

== Results ==
Party		Party Leader	# of candidates	Seats				Popular Vote		
Party		Party Leader	# of candidates	1982	Dissolution	Elected	% Change	#	%	Change
	Liberal	Frank McKenna	58	18	19	58		246,702	60.39%	
	Progressive Conservative	Richard Hatfield	58	39	38	0		116,798	28.59%	
	New Democratic	George Little	58	1	1	0		43,033	10.55%	
	Independents		10	-	-	-		1,933	0.47%	
***	Total			58	58	58		408,516	100.0%	

Popular vote
Liberal	60.39%
PC	28.59%
New Democratic	10.55%
Others	0.47%

Seats summary
Liberal	100.00%

== Results by riding ==
=== North ===
Consisting of Victoria, Madawaska, Restigouche and Gloucester county ridings.

Electoral district	Candidates				Incumbent
Electoral district	Liberal	PC	NDP	Other	Incumbent
Victoria-Tobique	Dr. Larry R. Kennedy 3,787	J. Douglas Moore 2,126	Evelyn Hathaway 372		J. Douglas Moore
Grand Falls	Paul E. Duffie 4,124	Réal Dionne 997	Henri Soucy 224		Everard Daigle†
Madawaska-les-Lacs	Georges Corriveau 3,839	Jean-Pierre Ouellet 1,933	Maurice Clavette 368		Jean-Pierre Ouellet
Madawaska Centre	Gérald Clavette 3,136	Don Marmen 1,759	Paul Morneault 386		Gérald Clavette
Edmundston	Roland Beaulieu 4,526	J. Pius Bard 1,387	Rodolphe Martin 394		Roland Beaulieu
Madawaska South	Pierrette Ringuette 2,597	Percy P. Mockler 2,272	Jean-Claude Bosse 131		Percy P. Mockler
Restigouche West	Jean-Paul Savoie 3,479	Yvon Poitras 3,462	James Gallant 262		Yvon Poitras
Campbellton	Edmond Blanchard 4,278	Fernand G. Dubé 2,244	Clara I. MacMillan 362		Fernand G. Dubé
Dalhousie	Allan Maher 4,479	Scott Chedore 919	Stewart Beckingham 380		Allan Maher
Restigouche East	Rayburn Doucett 3,382	Paul E. McIntyre 1,599	Wayne Lapointe 190		Rayburn Doucett
Nigadoo-Chaleur	Pierre Godin 5,953	Annonciade "Nancy" Arsenault 1,478	John Gagnon 595		Pierre Godin
Nepisiguit-Chaleur	Frank Branch 5,086	Claude Albert 1,029	Harry Scott 323		Frank Branch
Bathurst	Paul Kenny 6,281	René Pratt 1,126	Richard Doucet 566		Paul Kenny
Caraquet	Bernard Thériault 5,642	Emery Robichaud 4,508	Gérard Rousselle 171		Emery Robichaud
Shippagan-les-Îles	Aldéa Landry 5,601	Jean Gauvin 3,993	Charles Rail 100		Jean Gauvin
Tracadie	Douglas M. Young 5,787	Colette McGraw 3,081	Serge Robichaud 823	Fernand Losier (Ind.) 184	Douglas M. Young

=== Central ===
Consisting of Carleton, York, Sunbury and Northumberland county ridings.

Electoral district	Candidates				Incumbent
Electoral district	Liberal	PC	NDP	Other	Incumbent
Carleton North	B. Fred Harvey 2,687	Charles G. Gallagher 1,963	Anna Marie Kilfoil 217		Charles G. Gallagher
Carleton Centre	Allison Winston DeLong 2,787	Richard B. Hatfield 1,853	Kathryn Campbell 183		Richard B. Hatfield
Carleton South	Bruce Smith 3,059	Steven Porter 2,032	Arthur L. Slipp 303		Steven Porter
York North	Bob Simpson 6,221	David Bishop 2,714	Craig Melanson 1,075		David Bishop
York South	Al Lacey 6,894	Les Hull 3,485	Gary Hughes 1,002	H. Robert A. Storr (Ind.) 108	Les Hull
Fredericton South	Russ King 7,384	David Clark 2,672	Shauna MacKenzie 2,323	Harry John Marshall (Ind.) 116	David Clark
Fredericton North	Jim Wilson 6,667	Ed Allen 3,584	Carman J. Burns 888	Gordon "Brian" King (Ind.) 354	Ed Allen
Sunbury	Doug Harrison 4,551	Horace Smith 1,917	Christina Corey 569		Horace Smith
Oromocto	Tom Gilbert 3,807	Joe Mombourquette 1,377	Barbara Carr 436		Joe Mombourquette
Southwest Miramichi	Morris Green 4,676	Kevin Price 1,390	Patrick Kelly 180	Burton Joseph Kehoe (Ind.) 70	Morris Green
Miramichi-Newcastle	John McKay 4,120	Paul Dawson 3,334	Jeanne Theriault 214		Paul Dawson
Chatham	Frank McKenna 4,653	Leon Bremner 1,044	Patricia Marie Clancy 248		Frank McKenna
Bay du Vin	Reg MacDonald 3,026	Roger "Butch" Wedge 2,460	Yvon Roy 130		Butch Wedge
Miramichi Bay	Donald "Danny" Gay 4,422	James K. "Jim" Gordon 2,575	Joyce Carter 154		Jim Gordon

=== South West ===
Consisting of Queens, Kings, Saint John and Charlotte county ridings.

Electoral district	Candidates				Incumbent
Electoral district	Liberal	PC	NDP	Other	Incumbent
Queens North	Doug Tyler 2,212	Constance M. Webber 1,442	Ruth Nightingale 135		Wilfred Bishop†
Queens South	Vaughn Blaney 2,075	Robert B. McCready 1,296	Susan Barton 256		Robert B. McCready
Kings West	Laureen Jarrett 6,717	Don Horne 2,811	George Little 4,397		John B. M. Baxter, Jr.†
Kings Centre	Dr. Kal Seaman 4,419	Harold Newton Fanjoy 2,426	Marian G. Jefferies 1,392	Calvert M. "Colby" Fraser (Ind.) 403; Edward Freeman Gaunce (Ind.) 31	Harold Newton Fanjoy
Kings East	P.A. "Pete" Dalton 4,662	Hazen Myers 2,737	Mark Dibblee Connell 815		Hazen Myers
Saint John Fundy	Stuart Jamieson 2,724	Bev Harrison 2,399	Ben Donaldson 1,459		Bev Harrison
East Saint John	Peter Trites 3,746	Gary William Woodroffe 1,737	Ervan Cronk 2,976	Dolores H. Cook (Ind.) 375; Frank Brown (Ind.) 272	Peter Trites
Saint John Harbour	Louis Murphy 2,705	Gay Wittrien 830	Kenneth Wilcox 768		Louis Murphy
Saint John South	John Mooney 1,974	Nancy Teed 1,133	David Brown 1,416		Nancy Teed
Saint John Park	Shirley Dysart 2,596	Jean Porter 820	Paul Allen Maccovour 979		Shirley Dysart
Saint John North	Leo A. McAdam 2,753	Eric John Kipping 1,165	Lesley Orill MacLean 952		Eric John Kipping
Saint John West	Jane Barry 4,208	G. M. Keith Dow 3,057	Bob Jones 1,574		G. M. Keith Dow
Charlotte-Fundy	Eric Allaby 2,475	James Nelson Tucker 1,340	Dorothy Matthews 220		James Nelson Tucker
Charlotte Centre	Sheldon Lee 2,431	Stanley J. Smith 765	Graham Richardson 133		Sheldon Lee
Charlotte West	Reid Hurley 2,286	Leland W. McGaw 1,434	Ray "Bud" Parks 211		Leland W. McGaw
St. Stephen-Milltown	Ann Breault 2,054	Bob Jackson 1,922	Rick MacMillan 132	C. Ronald Campbell (Ind.) 21	Bob Jackson

=== South East ===
Consisting of Kent, Westmorland and Albert county ridings.

Electoral district	Candidates				Incumbent
Electoral district	Liberal	PC	NDP	Other	Incumbent
Kent North	Conrad Landry 3,697	Gérald Guimond 1,414	Charles Richard 416		Conrad Landry
Kent Centre	Alan R. Graham 3,232	Sammy Arsenault 662	Neil Gardner 268		Alan R. Graham
Kent South	Camille Thériault 5,546	Omer Léger 3,242	Gérald Mazerolle 522		Omer Léger
Shediac	Azor LeBlanc 7,219	Allard Robichaud 2,087	Omer W. Bourgue 858		Azor LeBlanc
Tantramar	Marilyn Trenholme 3,160	Lloyd Folkins 1,085	Robert Arthur Hall 1,825		Robert Arthur Hall
Memramcook	Greg O'Donnell 5,220	Clarence Cormier 2,914	Claire Doiron 932		Clarence Cormier
Moncton East	Ray Frenette 5,131	David Cutler 1,114	Raymond Boucher 1,046		Ray Frenette
Moncton North	Mike McKee 6,570	Stephen M. Trueman 1,083	Chris Collins 1,099		Mike McKee
Moncton West	Jim Lockyer 4,853	Mabel DeWare 1,916	David Lang 786		Mabel DeWare
Petitcodiac	Hollis S. Steeves 7,081	C.W. "Bill" Harmer 3,833	Richard James Hay 2,368		Bill Harmer
Riverview	Hubert Seamans 5,357	Dave Richardson 2,002	Terry Boudreau 814		Hubert Seamans
Albert	Harold A. Terris 2,668	Malcolm MacLeod 1,818	Eugene R. Marshall 765		Malcolm MacLeod
