= 1982 New Brunswick general election =

Canadian provincial election

← 1978	October 12, 1982	1987 →

58 seats of the Legislative Assembly of New Brunswick 30 seats were needed for a majority
	First party	Second party	Third party
		Lib	NDP
Leader	Richard Hatfield	Doug Young	George Little
Party	Progressive Conservative	Liberal	New Democratic
Leader since	1967	1982	1980
Leader's seat	Carleton Centre	Tracadie	Ran in Kings West (lost)
Last election	30	28	0
Seats won	39	18	1
Seat change	▲9	▼10	▲1
Percentage	47.45%	41.3%	10.2%
Swing	▲3.06%	▼3.06%	▲3.72%
- Popular vote by riding. As this is an FPTP election, seat totals are not determined by popular vote, but instead via results by each riding.
Premier before election
Richard Hatfield
Progressive Conservative
Premier after election
Richard Hatfield
Progressive Conservative

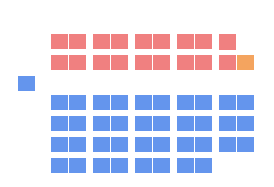
Rendition of party representation in the 50th New Brunswick Legislative Assembly decided by this election Progressive Conservatives (39) Liberals (18) New Democrats (1)

The 1982 New Brunswick general election was held on October 12, 1982, to elect 58 members to the 50th New Brunswick Legislative Assembly, the governing house of the province of New Brunswick, Canada. It saw Richard Hatfield's Progressive Conservative Party win its largest majority ever to that time. (Bernard Lord beat this record in 1999.)

== Background ==
The Opposition Liberal Party had changed leaders four times since the eve of the 1978 election. It chose Doug Young just months before the vote in a divisive contest that came down to a final ballot against Joseph A. Day.

== Campaign ==
The PCs ran two separate campaigns - one in English and one in French. The francophone campaign, which was mostly run by Hatfield's French lieutenant Jean-Maurice Simard, began with the Grand Ralliement, a symposium on language rights which took place in Shippagan ten days before the election call. Over 400 notable Acadians and other francophones attended. The dual campaigns were remarkably separate from each other, and in some cases contradictory: the English campaign revolved around attacking Doug Young's economic record, while the French campaign pointed out Hatfield's role working with Liberal Prime Minister Pierre Trudeau in enshrining francophone rights in the Charter of Rights and Freedoms.

The Liberals, divided by their recent leadership contest, ran a lackluster campaign which allowed Hatfield's and Simard's overtures to the Acadian population to carry many seats that had been Liberal strongholds for generations, including 10 of 21 Acadian ridings. The Parti Acadien made its last appearance, as the Conservatives adopted several key points of their former platform.

The New Democratic Party of New Brunswick elected Bob Hall as its first ever Member of the Legislative Assembly. He was later joined by a second NDP MLA, Peter Trites, in a by-election.

== Results ==
1982 New Brunswick Election Results
Party	Leader	Results	
Party	Leader	Seats	% of votes cast
Progressive Conservative	Richard Hatfield	39	47.45
Liberal	Doug Young	18	41.30
New Democratic	George Little	1	10.20
Parti Acadien	Louise Blanchard	0	0.87
Independents		0	0.18
Total		58	100.00

Popular vote
PC	47.45%
Liberal	41.30%
New Democratic	10.20%
Others	1.05%

Seats summary
PC	67.24%
Liberal	31.03%
New Democratic	1.72%

== Results by riding ==
=== North ===
Consisting of Victoria, Madawaska, Restigouche and Gloucester county ridings.

Electoral district	Candidates				Incumbent
Electoral district	PC	Liberal	NDP	Other	Incumbent
Victoria-Tobique	J. Douglas Moore 3,015	Maurice A. Dionne 2,556	Earl W. Christensen 333		J. Douglas Moore
Grand Falls	Bessie Cote 2,017	Everard H. Daigle 3,129	Patricia Morrell 155		Everard H. Daigle
Madawaska-les-Lacs	Jean-Pierre Ouellet 3,071	Luc Daigle 2,545	Rino Pelletier 176		Jean-Pierre Ouellet
Madawaska Centre	Jacques Tremblay 1,152	Gérald Clavette 2,774	Rodolphe Martin 241		Gérald Clavette
Edmundston	Jean-Maurice Simard 3,393	Laurier Levesque 2,572	Louise Winchester 426		Jean-Maurice Simard
Madawaska South	Percy Mockler 2,561	Héliodore Côté 2,108	Paul Murphy 87		Héliodore Côté
Restigouche West	Yvon Poitras 2,885	Alfred J. Roussel 2,680		Armand Ploudre (Parti acadien) 1,195	Alfred J. Roussel
Campbellton	Fernand G. Dubé 3,917	Lumina Senechal 2,467	John F. "Lofty" MacMillan 556		Fernand G. Dubé
Dalhousie	A.R. Sandy MacLean 1,866	Allan Maher 3,179	Bertha Huard 621	Réal Gendron (Parti acadien) 91	Allan Maher
Restigouche East	Aurèle Desrosiers 2,012	Rayburn Donald Doucett 2,418	Wayne Lapointe 507		Rayburn Donald Doucett
Nigadoo-Chaleur	Daniel Comeau 2,601	Pierre Godin 4,057	Rhéal Boudreau 996	André Blanchard (Parti acadien) 174	Pierre Godin
Nepisiguit-Chaleur	Patrice Battah 1,502	Frank Branch 3,510	Sherwood Scott 634	Léon Losier (Parti acadien) 205	Frank Branch
Bathurst	Jim MacLaggan 2,820	Paul Kenny 3,406	Kevin Mann, Jr. 2,352		Paul Kenny
Caraquet	Emery Robichaud 4,619	Onil Doiron 3,733	Yvon Roy 271	Louise Blanchard (Parti acadien) 966	Onil Doiron
Shippagan-les-Îles	Jean Gauvin 5,238	André Robichaud 3,487		Laval Auclair (Parti acadien) 113	Jean Gauvin
Tracadie	Henri Thomas 3,440	Doug Young 5,308		Michael Blanchard (Parti acadien) 301; Fernand Losier (Ind.) 193	Doug Young

=== Central ===
Consisting of Carleton, York, Sunbury and Northumberland county ridings.

Electoral district	Candidates				Incumbent
Electoral district	PC	Liberal	NDP	Other	Incumbent
Carleton North	Charles G. Gallagher 2,189	Robert D. MacElwain 1,725	Larry Lamont 240		Charles G. Gallagher
Carleton Centre	Richard B. Hatfield 2,266	David E. Crouse 1,976	L. William Maxon 128		Richard B. Hatfield
Carleton South	Steven P. Porter 2,811	Stephen A.R. "Steve" Paget 1,534	Arthur L. Slipp 451		Steven P. Porter
York North	David Bishop 4,278	John Hildebrand 3,667	Elizabeth Weir 1,115		David Bishop
York South	Les Hull 5,289	Ralph Annis 3,933	Dan Weston 664		Les Hull
Fredericton South	Dave Clark 5,507	Steve Patterson 4,369	Tom Good 1,716	Harry John Marshall (Ind.) 87	Bud Bird†
Fredericton North	Edwin G. Allen 6,392	Bob C. Chase 3,384	Nancy MacFarland 958		Edwin G. Allen
Sunbury	Horace Smith 3,192	Michael Edward McTiernan 2,680	Anna Trefry 401		Horace Smith
Oromocto	Joe Mombourquette 2,583	LeRoy Washburn 2,534			LeRoy Washburn
Southwest Miramichi	Sterling Hambrook 2,343	Morris Green 3,225	John Barry 244	Floyd Wilson (Ind.) 183	Morris Green
Miramichi-Newcastle	Paul Dawson 3,461	John McKay 2,988	Jerry Dunnett 761		John McKay
Chatham	John J. Barry 2,537	Frank J. McKenna 2,618	John T. McLaughlin 633		Frank Kane†
Bay du Vin	Roger "Butch" Wedge 2,579	Reg MacDonald 2,462	Harold J. Manual 155	Robert Wilfred Melanson (Parti acadien) 35	Norbert Thériault†
Miramichi Bay	James K. "Jim" Gordon 3,263	Alcide Léger 3,051	J. Albert Richardson 275		Edgar LeGresley†

=== South West ===
Consisting of Queens, Kings, Saint John and Charlotte county ridings.

Electoral district	Candidates				Incumbent
Electoral district	PC	Liberal	NDP	Other	Incumbent
Queens North	Wilfred G. Bishop 1,911	Cyril MacDonald 1,330	Frank Wuhr 212	William Taylor (Ind.) 93	Wilfred G. Bishop
Queens South	Robert B. McCready 1,799	Dawn Bremner 1,437	Mike Gormley 212		Robert B. McCready
Kings West	John B. M. Baxter 5,226	Malcolm A. Barry 3,219	George Little 3,034		John B. M. Baxter
Kings Centre	Harold Fanjoy 4,012	Edward Kelly 2,165	Marian Jefferies 1,283		Harold Fanjoy
Kings East	Hazen Elmer Myers 3,808	Gordon A. Lewis 2,161	Mark Connell 1,011		Hazen Elmer Myers
Saint John Fundy	Bev Harrison 3,064	Fred Fuller 1,746	Lawrence D. Hanley 1,585		Bev Harrison
East Saint John	G.S. "Gerry" Merrithew 4,246	Brian Fraser Hurley 2,359	Peter Trites 2,254		Gerry Merrithew
Saint John Harbour	Foster Hammond 1,892	Louis Edward Murphy 2,055	Dee Dee M.A. Daigle 695		Louis Edward Murphy
Saint John South	Nancy Clark Teed 1,890	Brian McCarthy 1,521	David Brown 1,012		Nancy Clark Teed
Saint John Park	Twyla Hartt 1,920	Shirley Dysart 2,247	David T. Pye 727		Shirley Dysart
Saint John North	Eric J. Kipping 2,223	Joseph A. Day 2,078	Erik Kraglund 1,079		Eric J. Kipping
Saint John West	G. M. Keith Dow 4,590	Al Brien 2,701	Barry Robson 1,167		Rodman Logan†
Charlotte-Fundy	James Tucker 2,291	Eric Allaby 1,272	Jim Aucoin 260		James Tucker
Charlotte Centre	Gregory F. Thompson 1,384	Sheldon A. Lee 1,471	Wayne Townsend 217		Sheldon A. Lee
Charlotte West	Leland W. McGaw 1,992	Dave E. Lively 1,237	Joseph N. Hansen 330		Leland W. McGaw
St. Stephen-Milltown	Bob Jackson 2,155	Joel Hansen 1,372	Judy Olsen 243		Bill Cockburn†

=== South East ===
Consisting of Kent, Westmorland and Albert county ridings.

Electoral district	Candidates				Incumbent
Electoral district	PC	Liberal	NDP	Other	Incumbent
Kent North	Elzée Thebeau 2,129	Conrad Landry 2,750	Charles R. Richard 357		Joseph Daigle†
Kent Centre	Fernand Savoie 1,244	Alan R. Graham 2,691	Derrold H. Barnes 216	Ronald S. MacDonald (Ind.) 77	Alan R. Graham
Kent South	Omer Léger 4,829	Bertin LeBlanc 3,732	Gérald Mazerolle 236		Bertin LeBlanc
Shediac	Alfred Landry 4,842	Azor LeBlanc 5,135	Henri-Eugène Duguay 273	Omer Bourque (Parti acadien) 86	Azor LeBlanc
Tantramar	Irvin D. Robinson 2,063	John Gideon Carter 1,334	Robert Arthur Hall 2,503		Lloyd Folkins†
Memramcook	Clarence Cormier 4,032	William "Bill" Malenfant 3,951	Ulysse Bastarache 438		Bill Malenfant
Moncton East	Norman H. Crossman 2,688	Ray Frenette 3,817	Raymond Boucher 687	Gilles Frenette (Parti acadien) 165; Raymond Leger (Ind.) 75	Ray Frenette
Moncton North	Kathryn Barnes 3,032	Mike McKee 4,768	Thomas F. Wilson 802		Mike McKee
Moncton West	Mabel DeWare 4,242	Wayne Patterson 2,892	Brian Harvey 601		Mabel DeWare
Petitcodiac	C.W. "Bill" Harmer 6,388	Hollis Stanley Steeves 3,813	Charles B. Sullivan 1,474		Bill Harmer
Riverview	Brenda M. Robertson 4,949	Jim Anderson 2,151	Ed Foley 582		Brenda M. Robertson
Albert	Malcolm MacLeod 2,827	Gordon L. Rattray 1,360	Gary Wayne Bannister 605		Malcolm MacLeod
