= 1978 New Brunswick general election =

Canadian provincial election

← 1974	October 23, 1978	1982 →

58 seats of the Legislative Assembly of New Brunswick 30 seats needed for a majority
	First party	Second party	Third party
		Lib	NDP
Leader	Richard Hatfield	Joseph Daigle	John LaBossiere
Party	Progressive Conservative	Liberal	New Democratic
Leader since	October 13, 1967	May 6, 1978	1976
Leader's seat	Carleton Centre	Kent North	Ran in Kent Centre (lost)
Last election	33	25	0
Seats won	30	28	0
Seat change	▼3	▲3	Steady
Percentage	44.39%	44.36%	6.48%
Swing	▼2.37%	▼3.12%	▲3.55%
- Popular vote by riding. As this is an FPTP election, seat totals are not determined by popular vote, but instead via results by each riding.
Premier before election
Richard Hatfield
Progressive Conservative
Premier after election
Richard Hatfield
Progressive Conservative

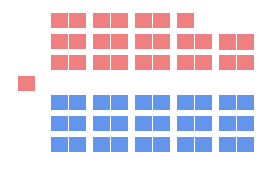
Rendition of party representation in the 49th New Brunswick Legislative Assembly decided by this election Progressive Conservatives (30) Liberals (28)

The 1978 New Brunswick general election was held on October 23, 1978, to elect 58 members to the 49th New Brunswick Legislative Assembly, the governing house of the province of New Brunswick, Canada. Richard Hatfield's Progressive Conservative Party narrowly won its third term.

The governing PCs won 30 seats to 28 for the opposition; the result was the closest in New Brunswick history. The popular vote was very close: 146,719 votes were cast for Conservative candidates, and 146,596 for Liberals. In order to secure a workable majority following the election, Hatfield appointed Liberal Robert McCready as speaker of the legislature, despite strong objections from McCready's Liberal colleagues; McCready went on to seek re-election as a Conservative and served in Hatfield's cabinet.

The Parti Acadien had its best ever showing in the election, winning 12% of the vote in the ridings where it fielded candidates, and coming within 200 votes of electing Armand Plourde in Restigouche West.

== Background ==
In the lead up to 1978, the Opposition Liberal Party seemed destined to return to power. A number of scandals had been tied to the Conservatives and Liberal leader Robert Higgins was widely popular. In early 1978, Higgins believed he had tied some of the scandals directly to Hatfield himself. In a bold move, Higgins promised to resign should Hatfield prove that he was not tied directly to the scandal, which Hatfield promptly did. Higgins was forced to abruptly resign and was replaced by Joseph Daigle as leader. The Liberals mused that Hatfield had purposely ensured false information was leaked to the Liberals to lead them into making false accusations.

Higgins' resignation created Hatfield's best chance to go to the polls. He called an election shortly after Daigle became Liberal leader. Despite the lack of a direct link to Hatfield, scandal remained tied to his government and a close election result was assured.

== Campaign ==
Hatfield's government was not entirely clean. The Liberals pointed to the Conservatives' budgets, which no longer maintained a surplus. The Bricklin failure was also fresh on voters' minds. While campaigning in anglophone sections of the province, Hatfield accused Daigle of being an anti-monarchist for supporting Pierre Trudeau's constitutional reforms.

== Results ==
1978 New Brunswick election results
Party	Leader	Results	
Party	Leader	Seats	% of votes cast
Progressive Conservative	Richard Hatfield	30	44.39%
Liberal	Joseph Daigle	28	44.36%
New Democratic	John LaBossiere	0	6.48%
Parti Acadien	Jean-Pierre Lanteigne	0	3.5%
Independents		0	1.27%
Total		58	100.0%

Popular vote
PC	44.39%
Liberal	44.36%
New Democratic	6.48%
Others	4.77%

Seats summary
PC	51.72%
Liberal	48.28%

== Results by riding ==
=== North ===
Consisting of Victoria, Madawaska, Restigouche and Gloucester county ridings.

Electoral district	Candidates				Incumbent
Electoral district	PC	Liberal	NDP	Other	Incumbent
Victoria-Tobique	J. Douglas Moore 2,763	Bruce Hoyt 2,032	Earl W. Christensen 727		J. Stewart Brooks†
Grand Falls	Joseph H. Rideout 1,063	Everard H. Daigle 2,779	Guildoi Pelletier 621		Everard H. Daigle
Madawaska-les-Lacs	Jean-Pierre Ouellet 2,876	Nelson Bellefleur 2,071		Yves C. LeClerc (Parti acadien) 90	Jean-Pierre Ouellet
Madawaska Centre	Léonard Plourde 1,352	Gérald Clavette 2,208		Aline Thérèse Gagnon (Parti acadien) 106	Gérald Clavette
Edmundston	Jean-Maurice Simard 3,228	Donald D'Amours 2,470		Céline Couturier (Parti acadien) 194	Jean-Maurice Simard
Madawaska South	Jean-Marc Violette 1,398	Héliodore Côté 1,832		Père Léo Theriault (Ind.) 659; Jacques Lapointe (Parti acadien) 137	Daniel Daigle†
Restigouche West	Jean Guy Ramond 1,576	Alfred J. Roussel 2,174		Armand Plourde (Parti acadien) 2,003	Alfred J. Roussel
Campbellton	Fernand G. Dubé 2,734	J. H. Wilfred Senechal 2,467	Bryce Andrew 331	Paul Aubin (Parti acadien) 337	Fernand G. Dubé
Dalhousie	Aubrey Brownie 2,201	Allan E. Maher 2,726	Léopold Arseneault 274	Réal Gendron (Parti acadien) 246	John Potter†
Restigouche East	Guy Laviolette 1,402	Rayburn Donald Doucett 2,035	Gail Walsh 509	Roland Godin (Parti acadien) 217	Rayburn Donald Doucett
Nigadoo-Chaleur	Roland Boudreau 2,346	Pierre Godin 2,960	Kevin O'Connell 387	Dr. Jean-Pierre Lanteigne (Parti acadien) 1,103	Roland Boudreau
Nepisiguit-Chaleur	Hilaire Brideau 1,102	Frank Branch 3,156		Paul-Émile Mourant (Parti acadien) 858	Frank Branch
Bathurst	John A. Duffy 2,075	Paul Kenny 2,667	Kevin Mann 2,176	Lucie Losier (Parti acadien) 560	Eugene McGinley†
Caraquet	Beatrice "Bibi" Doiron 2,809	Onil Doiron 3,925		Michel Blanchard (Parti acadien) 1,534	Onil Doiron
Shippagan-les-Îles	Jean Gauvin 3,023	André Robichaud 2,476		Michel Haché (Ind.) 1,280; Laval Auclair (Parti acadien) 466	André Robichaud
Tracadie	George McLaughlin 2,490	Doug Young 4,374		Alyre Morais (Parti acadien) 806	Adjutor Ferguson†

=== Central ===
Consisting of Carleton, York, Sunbury and Northumberland county ridings.

Electoral district	Candidates				Incumbent
Electoral district	PC	Liberal	NDP	Other	Incumbent
Carleton North	Charles G. Gallagher 2,397	Samuel J. "Sam" Perkins 1,694			Charles G. Gallagher
Carleton Centre	Richard B. Hatfield 2,043	David Crouse 1,734			Richard B. Hatfield
Carleton South	Steven P. Porter 2,317	Pat Saunders 1,776	Garth Brewer 389		A. Edison Stairs†
York North	Adelbert David Bishop 3,681	Richard Albert Carr 3,137	Albert Fraser MacDonald 741		Adelbert David Bishop
York South	Leslie "Les" Hull 4,440	Blaine E. Hatt 3,036	Mark Allen Canning 444		Les Hull
Fredericton South	J. W. "Bud" Bird 5,525	Stephen Patterson 4,252	Margo Dunn 643	Harry John Marshall (Ind.) 92	George Everett Chalmers†
Fredericton North	Edwin G. Allen 5,304	Carl Edward Howe 3,528	Christopher Devlin Hicks 662		Lawrence Garvie†
Sunbury	Horace Smith 3,045	Ted Rogers 2,233	Randy E. Brodeur 373		Horace Smith
Oromocto	John Edward McKee 2,467	LeRoy Washburn 2,522	Jim Aucoin 283		LeRoy Washburn
Southwest Miramichi	John Munn 2,578	Morris Green 2,725			Sterling Hambrook†
Miramichi-Newcastle	Douglas R. Woods 3,127	John McKay 3,200			John McKay
Chatham	Greg Barry 2,019	Frank E. Kane 2,920	Lloyd Vienneau 379		Frank E. Kane
Bay du Vin	Robert S. Lamkey 1,816	L. Norbert Thériault 2,515		Joseph Alban Mazerolle (Ind.) 101	L. Norbert Thériault
Miramichi Bay	James Kenneth Gordon 1,750	Edgar LeGresley 2,232		Solomon Curry (Ind.) 1,524	Edgar LeGresley

=== South West ===
Consisting of Queens, Kings, Saint John and Charlotte county ridings.

Electoral district	Candidates				Incumbent
Electoral district	PC	Liberal	NDP	Other	Incumbent
Queens North	Wilfred George Bishop 2,059	Eva Andries 1,145			Wilfred George Bishop
Queens South	A.P. Hetherington 1,446	Robert B. McCready 1,577	Charles Viger 202		Robert Corbett†
Kings West	John B. M. Baxter 4,047	Jack Stevens 3,023	George Little 1,132		John B. M. Baxter
Kings Centre	Harold N. Fanjoy 3,284	David L. Nice 2,130	R. Harvey Watson 745		Harold N. Fanjoy
Kings East	Hazen Myers 3,251	Gordon A. Lewis 2,135	Ernest A. Seedhouse 342		George Horton†
Saint John Fundy	Beverly J. Harrison 2,196	Kevin Kilfoil 1,370	Larry Hanley 932		William J. Woodroffe†
East Saint John	G.S. "Gerry" Merrithew 3,626	George Creary 2,220	Douglas Justason 1,143		Gerry Merrithew
Saint John Harbour	E. Lorne Richardson 1,680	Louis E. Murphy 1,772	Harrison G. Harvey 625		John Turnbull†
Saint John South	Nancy Clark 1,622	John P. Mooney 1,543	David M. Brown 416		John P. Mooney
Saint John Park	Garry Bona 1,677	Shirley Dysart 1,976	David T. Pye 551		Robert J. Higgins†
Saint John North	Eric J. Kipping 1,906	Harry G. Colwell 1,569	Henry Thomas Watts 430		Shirley Dysart*
Saint John West	Rodman Emmason Logan 3,935	Delvan G. O'Brien 2,411	James William Orr 886		Rodman Emmason Logan
Charlotte-Fundy	James Nelson Tucker 1,741	Bernard L. Moses 1,311	George Robertson 164		James Nelson Tucker
Charlotte Centre	Robert D. "Bob" Lee 1,210	Sheldon Lee 1,404			DeCosta Young†
Charlotte West	Leland W. McGaw 1,815	Philip Earl Johnson 1,074	William C. Mosher 201		Leland W. McGaw
St. Stephen-Milltown	Bill Cockburn 1,986	Sydney Holmes 1,238	Charles Roland Campbell 136		Bill Cockburn

=== South East ===
Consisting of Kent, Westmorland and Albert county ridings.

Electoral district	Candidates				Incumbent
Electoral district	PC	Liberal	NDP	Other	Incumbent
Kent North	Louis Arsenault 1,070	Joseph Daigle 3,156		Philippe Ouellette (Parti acadien) 358	Joseph Z. Daigle
Kent Centre	Claude Giruan Warren 1,171	Alan Robert Graham 2,352	John B. LaBossiere 249	Pierrette Leblanc (Parti acadien) 121	Alan Robert Graham
Kent South	Omer Léger 3,279	Bertin LeBlanc 4,276		Dolan Surette (Parti acadien) 138	Omer Léger
Shediac	Régis Cormier	Azor LeBlanc 5,342		Henri-Eugène Duguay (Parti acadien) 603	Azor LeBlanc
Tantramar	Lloyd Folkins 2,019	James G. Purdy 1,232	Robert Arthur Hall 1,924		Lloyd Folkins
Memramcook	Euclide Daigle 1,348	William "Bill" Malenfant 4,605	Joseph Eugene Guy LeBlanc 345	Donatien Gaudet (Parti acadien) 643	Bill Malenfant
Moncton East	Raymond J. Thibodeau 2,006	Ray Frenette 3,921	John William Kingston 592	Simone LeBlanc-Rainsville (Parti acadien) 469	Ray Frenette
Moncton North	Albert L. Galbraith 3,023	Father Mike McKee 4,362	Guy J. Richard 477	David Britton (Parti acadien) 225	Mike McKee
Moncton West	Mabel DeWare 4,211	Donald A. Canning 2,831		Paul Hebert (Parti acadien) 230	Paul Creaghan†
Petitcodiac	C.W. "Bill" Harmer 4,911	Harold Alward 3,420	Ronald McGrath 621	Rev. C. Edward Pickett (Ind.) 556; Patrick D. Clarke (Parti acadien) 117	Bill Harmer
Riverview	Brenda M. Robertson 4,443	W. A. "Bill" Payne 1,967			Brenda M. Robertson
Albert	Malcolm MacLeod 2,669	Grant William Colpitts 1,289	Robert J. Candy 351		Malcolm MacLeod
