= 1985 New Brunswick Liberal Association leadership election =

- Date: May 4, 1985
- Convention: Moncton
- Resigning leader: Doug Young
- Won by: Frank McKenna
- Ballots: 1
- Candidates: 2

The New Brunswick Liberal Association held a leadership election in 1985 to replace former leader Doug Young, the elected leader would face four-term premier Richard Hatfield in an election expected in 1986. Frank McKenna defeated legislative veteran Ray Frenette, who had served as the party's interim leader until early 1985.

== Candidates ==
- Ray Frenette, MLA since 1974 and interim leader from 1982 to 1985.
- Frank McKenna, MLA since 1982.

== Results ==
1985 Liberal leadership convention results May 4, 1985
Candidate	Votes	%
Frank McKenna	1,901	69.2
Ray Frenette	847	31.8
