= New Brunswick Liberal Association leadership elections =

This page lists the results of leadership elections held by the New Brunswick Liberal Association. Before 1930 leaders were chosen by the caucus.

== 1930 leadership convention ==
(Held April 23, 1930)

- Wendell P. Jones acclaimed

Jones was defeated in the 1930 general election and resigned. Allison Dysart remained House leader.

== 1932 leadership convention ==
(Held October 5, 1932)

- Allison Dysart elected
- John B. McNair

(Note: the vote totals do not appear to have been released. Dysart won by a large majority)

== Developments 1932-1954 ==
Dysart resigned as premier in 1940. He was succeeded by McNair on March 13 of that year. Following McNair's personal defeat in the 1952 general election which also swept the Liberals from power he resigned and Austin Claude Taylor was chosen House leader.

== 1954 leadership convention ==
(Held on October 16, 1954)

- Austin Claude Taylor acclaimed

Taylor resigned when he was appointed to the Senate on January 3, 1957. Joseph E. Connolly was chosen House leader.

== 1958 leadership convention ==
(Held on October 11, 1958)

First Ballot:

- Louis Robichaud 239
- A. Wesley Stuart 208
- Joseph E. Connolly 176
- George T. Urquhart 87
- T.E. Duffie 61
- Henry J. Murphy 53
- Howard Hicks 1

Second Ballot (Hicks eliminated. Murphy, Duffie and Urquhart withdrew):

- Louis Robichaud 403
- A. Wesley Stuart 278
- Joseph E. Connolly 151

Third Ballot (Connolly eliminated):

- Louis Robichaud 517
- A. Wesley Stuart 304

== 1971 leadership convention ==
(Held October 16, 1971)

First Ballot:

- Robert Higgins 737
- John G. Bryden 575
- Norbert Theriault 289
- H. H. Williamson 89
- Maurice Harquail 21

Second Ballot (Harquail eliminated. Williamson and Theriault withdrew):

- Robert Higgins 986
- John G. Bryden 683

== 1978 leadership convention ==
(Held May 6, 1978)

First Ballot:

- Joseph Daigle 700
- John G. Bryden 647
- Doug Young 432
- John Mooney 309
- Herb Breau 225
- Robert McCready 100

Second Ballot (McCready eliminated. Breau and Mooney withdrew):

- Joseph Daigle 1,042
- John G. Bryden 775
- Doug Young 565

Third Ballot (Young eliminated):

- Joseph Daigle 1,363
- John G. Bryden 899

Daigle resigned due to a caucus revolt on November 19, 1981. Doug Young was chosen interim leader.

== 1982 leadership convention ==
(Held on February 27, 1982)

- Doug Young 1,324
- Joseph A. Day 811
- Ray Frenette 308
- Allan E. Maher 160

== 1985 leadership convention ==
(Held May 4, 1985)

- Frank McKenna 1,901
- Ray Frenette 847

== 1998 leadership convention ==
(Held May 2, 1998)

- Camille Theriault 2.095
- Greg Byrne 1,005
- Bernard Richard 666

== 2002 leadership convention ==
(Held May 11, 2002)

- Shawn Graham 1,349
- Jack MacDougall 461

== 2012 leadership convention ==
(Held October 27, 2012 in Moncton)

2012 Liberal leadership election results
Candidate	Points	%
Brian Gallant	3,259.44	59.26
Michael Murphy	2,089.39	37.99
Nick Duivenvoorden	151.17	2.75

== 2019 leadership convention ==
(Scheduled for June 22, 2019 in Saint John, cancelled due to acclamation)

- Kevin Vickers (acclaimed)

== 2022 leadership convention ==
(Held August 6, 2022 in Fredericton)

First Ballot % of points

- T. J. Harvey 33.9%
- Susan Holt 32.12%
- Robert Gauvin 19.76%
- Donald Arseneault 14.22%

Aresenault eliminated

Second Ballot % of points

- T. J. Harvey 39.58%
- Susan Holt 36.76%
- Robert Gauvin 23.67%

Gauvin eliminated

Third Ballot % of points

- Susan Holt 51.67%
- T. J. Harvey 48.33%

Holt elected
