= Kent Centre =

Defunct provincial electoral district in New Brunswick, Canada

New Brunswick electoral district

Defunct provincial electoral district
- Legislature: Legislative Assembly of New Brunswick
- District created: 1973
- District abolished: 1994
- First contested: 1974
- Last contested: 1991

Kent Centre was a provincial electoral district in New Brunswick, Canada. It was created from the multi-member riding of Kent in the 1973 electoral redistribution, and was abolished in the 1994 electoral redistribution.

== Members of the Legislative Assembly ==
Assembly	Years	Member	Party
Riding created from Kent (1827–1974)
48th	1974–1978	Alan R. Graham	Liberal
49th	1978–1982	Alan R. Graham	Liberal
50th	1982–1987	Alan R. Graham	Liberal
51st	1987–1991	Alan R. Graham	Liberal
52nd	1991–1995	Alan R. Graham	Liberal
Riding dissolved into Kent (1994–2013)

== Election results ==
1991 New Brunswick general election
Party	Candidate	Votes	%	±%
Liberal	Alan Graham	3,025	69.11	-8.54
Confederation of Regions	Percy Beers	626	14.30	–
New Democratic	Neil Gardner	379	8.66	+2.22
Progressive Conservative	David MacDonald	347	7.93	-7.98
Total valid votes		4,377	100.0	
Liberal hold		Swing		-11.42

1987 New Brunswick general election
Party	Candidate	Votes	%	±%
Liberal	Alan R. Graham	3,232	77.65	+14.00
Progressive Conservative	Sammy Arsenault	662	15.91	-13.51
New Democratic	Neil Gardner	268	6.44	+1.33
Total valid votes		4,162	100.0	
Liberal hold		Swing		+13.76

1982 New Brunswick general election
Party	Candidate	Votes	%	±%
Liberal	Alan R. Graham	2,691	63.65	+3.23
Progressive Conservative	Fernand Savoie	1,244	29.42	-0.66
New Democratic	Derrold H. Barnes	216	5.11	-1.29
Independent	Ronald S. MacDonald	77	1.82	–
Total valid votes		4,228	100.0	
Liberal hold		Swing		+1.94

1978 New Brunswick general election
Party	Candidate	Votes	%	±%
Liberal	Alan Robert Graham	2,352	60.42	+2.72
Progressive Conservative	Claude Giruan Warren	1,171	30.08	-9.12
New Democratic	John B. LaBossiere	249	6.40	+3.29
Parti acadien	Pierrette Leblanc	121	3.11	–
Total valid votes		3,893	100.0	
Liberal hold		Swing		+5.92

1974 New Brunswick general election
Party	Candidate	Votes	%
Liberal	Alan Graham	2,024	57.70
Progressive Conservative	Lloyd Girvan	1,375	39.20
New Democratic	Lawrence Murphy	109	3.11
Total valid votes		3,508	100.0
The previous multi-member riding of Kent elected 3 (of 3) Liberals in the last election. One Progressive Conservative was elected in a 1971 by-election. Alan R. Graham was one of three incumbents.

== See also ==
- List of New Brunswick provincial electoral districts
- Canadian provincial electoral districts
