= Doug Tyler =

Canadian politician

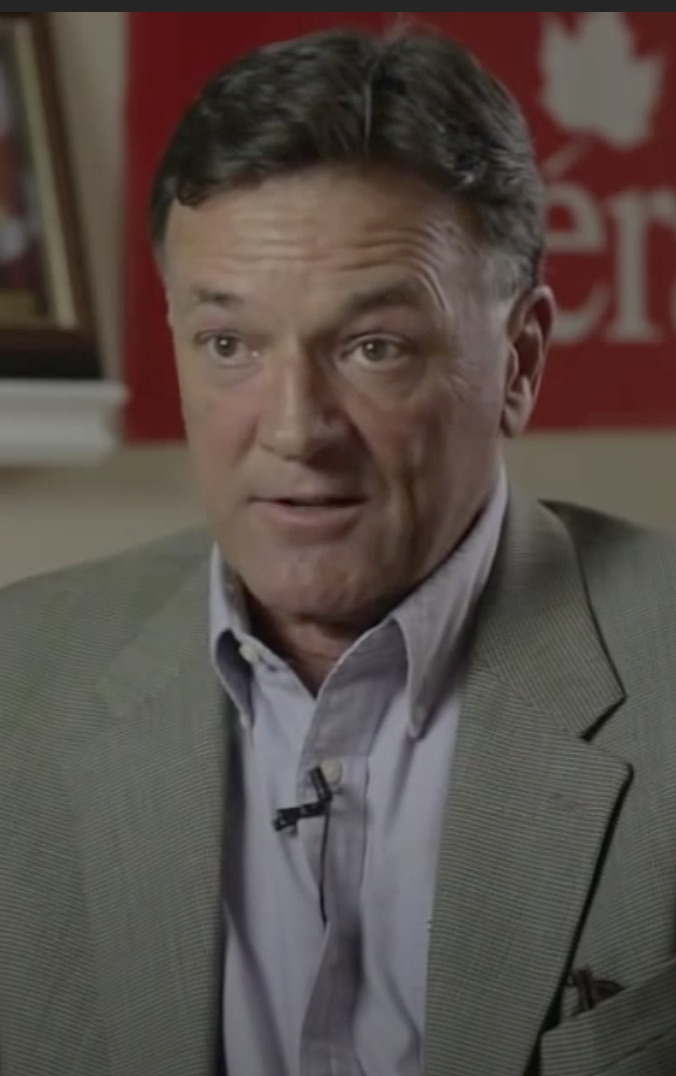
Tyler in 2013

Doug Tyler is a political figure in the province of New Brunswick, Canada.

Tyler was a member of the Legislative Assembly of New Brunswick from the 1987 election until his defeat in the 1999 election. He served in the cabinet from 1991 to 1999 overseeing various ministries, including a stint as Deputy Premier under Camille Thériault's leadership.

Tyler was campaign manager for Paul Duffie's unsuccessful bid for the New Brunswick Liberal Party leadership, campaign manager for the New Brunswick Liberals in the 2003 election, co-chair for the Liberal Party of Canada's campaign in New Brunswick in the 2004 federal election and co-campaign manager for the New Brunswick Liberals in the 2006 provincial election.

From 2004 to 2006 he served as chief of staff to New Brunswick MP Andy Scott in his role as Minister of Indian and Northern Affairs. On September 20, 2006, Premier-designate of New Brunswick Shawn Graham appointed Tyler to chair his transition team.

In his first press conference as Premier on October 3, 2006, Shawn Graham said that Doug Tyler was serving as his acting chief of staff. He was replaced by former cabinet colleague Bernard Thériault, who became Graham's first permanent chief of staff on October 30, 2006. He has worked at the Saint John-based public relations firm Revolution Strategy.

New Brunswick provincial government of Camille Thériault
Cabinet post (1)
Predecessor	Office	Successor
Alan R. Graham	Minister of Natural Resources and Energy; 1998–1999	Jeannot Volpé
Special Cabinet Responsibilities
Predecessor	Title	Successor
Alan R. Graham	Deputy Premier of New Brunswick; 1998–1999	Dale Graham
New Brunswick provincial government of Ray Frenette
Cabinet post (1)
Predecessor	Office	Successor
himself in McKenna government	Minister of Agriculture and Rural Development; 1997–1998	Stuart Jamieson
Special Cabinet Responsibilities
Predecessor	Title	Successor
Ray Frenette	Government House Leader; 1997–1998	Greg Byrne
New Brunswick provincial government of Frank McKenna
Cabinet post (1)
Predecessor	Office	Successor
Gérald Clavette	Minister of Agriculture and Rural Development; 1994–1997	himself in Frenette government
Special Cabinet Responsibilities
Predecessor	Title	Successor
Edmond Blanchard	Minister of State for Mines & Energy; 1991–1994	Laureen Jarrett
Other offices
new district	MLA for Grand Lake; 1995–1999	Succeeded by David Jordan (Progressive Conservative)
Preceded by Wilfred Bishop (Progressive Conservative)	MLA for Queens North; 1987–1995	district abolished
