= Alan R. Graham =

Canadian Farmer, businessman, former politician

Alan R. Graham MLA

Member of the Legislative Assembly of New Brunswick
- In office October 23, 1967 – October 19, 1998
- Preceded by: District created
- Succeeded by: Shawn Graham
- Constituency: Kent

Personal details
- Born: Alan Robert Graham; June 20, 1942 (age 83) Main River, New Brunswick
- Party: Liberal
- Spouse(s): 1) Sharon Crothers; 2) Constance Tramley
- Children: 5 children including Shawn
- Parent(s): Harrison M. Graham & Nell H. Ross
- Education: University of Moncton
- Occupation: Farmer, businessman, politician

Alan Robert Graham (born June 20, 1942) is a retired Canadian politician in the Province of New Brunswick and he is the father of Shawn Graham, who was Premier of New Brunswick from 2006 to 2010.

== Family history ==
Alan Graham is a son of Harrison Michael Graham (1901–1983) and Nellie Harris Ross (1900–1958).

== Longevity ==
Graham served the longest consecutive term of anyone in the history of the Legislative Assembly of New Brunswick, being re-elected in 1970, 1974, 1978, 1982, 1987, 1991 and 1995.

== Liberal politics ==
A Liberal, supporter of the government of Louis Robichaud from 1967 to 1970 and then served in opposition for 17 years until the Liberals returned to government by winning every seat in the 1987 election. Graham served in the cabinets of Frank McKenna and Ray Frenette but resigned his seat in 1998 and in the subsequent Kent County by-election, the community continued to support the Graham family and his son Shawn Graham was elected as MLA in 1998 and would go on to become leader of the Liberals in 2002, and win the 2006 election.

== Later political career ==
Graham was the Minister of Agriculture from 1987 to 1991, Minister of Natural Resources and Energy from 1991 to 1998 and served on Cabinet committees of Policy and Priorities, Board of Management, and Budget. From 1997 to 1998, he was Deputy Premier of New Brunswick. During his political career, Graham served on numerous Legislative Committees. While in opposition, he acted as critic for Agriculture, Natural Resources, Housing, Health, and Alcoholism and Drug Dependency. He was also Liberal Caucus Chairperson and Opposition House Leader. He was first appointed a member of the former Atomic Energy Control Board in 1999, and has since been reappointed a member of the Canadian Nuclear Safety Commission. He has been a Trustee of the Nature Conservancy of Canada, a member of the Board of the Atlantic Salmon Federation and an Honorary President of the Atlantic Canada Woodworking Centre of Excellence.

New Brunswick provincial government of Ray Frenette
Cabinet post (1)
Predecessor	Office	Successor
himself in McKenna government	Minister of Natural Resources; 1997–1998	Doug Tyler
Special Cabinet Responsibilities
Predecessor	Title	Successor
Ray Frenette	Deputy Premier of New Brunswick; 1997–1998	Doug Tyler

New Brunswick provincial government of Frank McKenna
Cabinet posts (2)
Predecessor	Office	Successor
Morris V. Green	Minister of Natural Resources; 1991–1997	himself in Frenette government
Malcolm MacLeod	Minister of Agriculture and Rural Development; 1987–1991	Gérald Clavette
