= Paul Duffie =

Canadian politician (born 1951)

Member of the Legislative Assembly of New Brunswick
- In office 1991–1999

New Brunswick Minister (of Municipalities from 1991-1995; of justice from 1995-1997)
- In office 1991–1997

Mayor of Grand Falls, New Brunswick
- In office 1986 – 1987, again from June 19, 2004-2008

New Brunswick Court Judge
- Incumbent
- Assumed office 2008

Personal details
- Born: Paul Duffie
- Party: Liberal

Paul Duffie (born June 14, 1951) is a former Canadian politician, lawyer, and judge in the province of New Brunswick. Duffie was born in Neguac, New Brunswick. A graduate of Ricker College in Houlton, Maine with a Bachelor of Science degree and the University of New Brunswick in Fredericton with a law degree. He was mayor of Grand Falls from 1986 until his election as MLA in 1987.

Elected as a Liberal in the Frank McKenna landslide, Duffie continued his law practice in addition to his legislative duties. In 1991, he was named to the board of governors for the University of New Brunswick.

In 1991, Duffie was re-elected as MLA and appointed to be the Minister of Education. He became Minister of Municipalities, Culture & Housing in 1994. Upon being re-elected in 1995 he became Minister of Justice.

Duffie resigned from cabinet in 1997, after considering a run for leader, to spend more time with his family. Duffie co-chaired the leadership campaign of Camille Theriault with Doug Tyler.

Duffie did not seek re-election in the 1999 general election.

In 2001, following the resignation of Theriault, Duffie was encouraged to run for leader. His biggest supporters in the seven-member Liberal caucus were House Leader Eric Allaby and former Minister of Transportation Sheldon Lee. In early 2002, Shawn Graham emerged as the clear leader in delegate selection meetings and Duffie dropped out of the race, backing Graham.

Though he originally pledged to run in the 2003 election, he backed fellow Liberal and fellow former Grand Falls mayor Ron Ouellette who was elected on June 9.

Duffie returned to municipal politics and was elected mayor of Grand Falls on May 10, 2004, 18 years after he was first elected to the post.

In June 2008, he was named a provincial court judge.

== Notes ==
New Brunswick provincial government of Frank McKenna
Cabinet posts (3)
Predecessor	Office	Successor
Edmond Blanchard	Minister of Justice and Attorney General; 1995–1997	Bernard Richard
Marcelle Mersereau	Minister of Municipalities, Culture and Housing; 1994–1995	Ann Breault
Shirley Dysart	Minister of Education; 1991–1994	Vaughn Blaney
