= Kent (New Brunswick provincial electoral district, 1994–2013) =

Defunct provincial electoral district in New Brunswick, Canada

New Brunswick electoral district
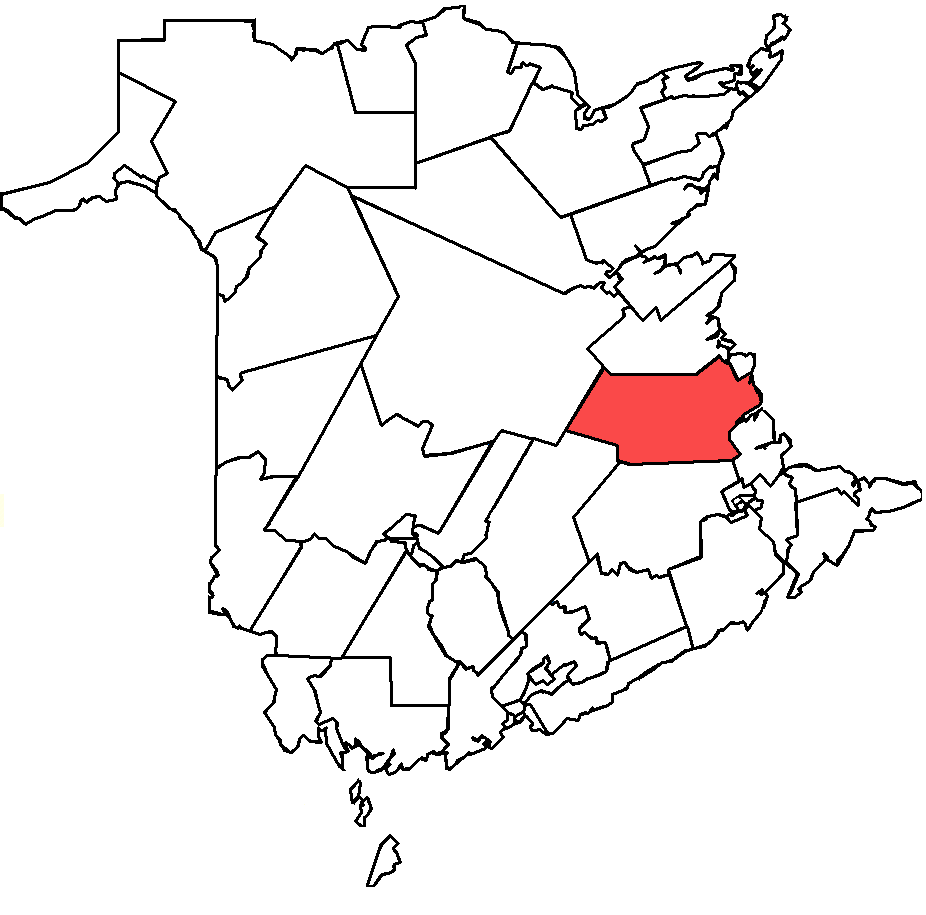
- Kent in relation to other New Brunswick Provincial electoral districts
- Coordinates: 46.474°N 65.118°W

Defunct provincial electoral district
- Legislature: Legislative Assembly of New Brunswick
- District created: 1994
- District abolished: 2013
- First contested: 1995
- Last contested: 2013

Demographics
- Electors (2010): 8,990
- Census division: Kent
- Census subdivision(s): Bouctouche, Buctouche 16, Dundas, Harcourt, Huskisson, Five Rivers, Richibucto (parish), Richibucto 15, Saint Mary, Saint-Paul, Weldford, Wellington

Kent was a provincial electoral district for the Legislative Assembly of New Brunswick, Canada. It was created in 1994 for the 1995 election, taking in most of Kent Centre and parts of Kent North. Its boundaries were expanded southward in 2006, while losing some territory to its north.

It was represented from its creation until 2013 by members of the Graham family. Senior Liberal cabinet minister and incumbent from Kent Centre Alan Graham was elected here in 1995. His son Shawn Graham, succeeded him in a 1998 by-election and was re-elected in the 1999, 2003, 2006 and 2010 general elections. The younger Graham served as Premier of New Brunswick from 2006 to 2010 and resigned in 2013 after the provincial conflict commissioner ruled he had violated the Members' Conflict of Interest Act in approving loan guarantees to a company with which Alan was associated.

== Members of the Legislative Assembly ==
Assembly	Years	Member	Party
Riding created from Kent Centre, Kent North and Kent South
53rd	1995–1998	Alan R. Graham	Liberal
53rd	1998–1999	Shawn Graham	Liberal
54th	1999–2003	Shawn Graham	Liberal
55th	2003–2006	Shawn Graham	Liberal
56th	2006–2010	Shawn Graham	Liberal
57th	2010–2013	Shawn Graham	Liberal
57th	2013–2014	Brian Gallant	Liberal
Riding dissolved into Kent South and Kent North

== Election results ==
New Brunswick provincial by-election, 15 April 2013
Party	Candidate	Votes	%	±%
Liberal	Brian Gallant	3,543	59.10	+3.75
New Democratic	Susan Levi-Peters	1,615	26.94	+11.86
Progressive Conservative	Jimmy Bourque	837	13.96	-12.46
Total valid votes		5,995	100.0	
Total rejected ballots		65	1.07	
Turnout		6,060	66.73	
Eligible voters		9,082		
Liberal hold		Swing		-4.06

2010 New Brunswick general election
Party	Candidate	Votes	%	±%
Liberal	Shawn Graham	3,817	55.35	+3.39
Progressive Conservative	Bruce Hickey	1,822	26.42	-18.57
New Democratic	Susan Levi-Peters	1,040	15.08	+12.02
Green	Garry Sanipass	217	3.15	–
Total valid votes		6,896	100.0	
Total rejected ballots		75	1.08	
Turnout		6,971	77.54	
Eligible voters		8,990		
Liberal hold		Swing		+10.98

2006 New Brunswick general election
Party	Candidate	Votes	%	±%
Liberal	Shawn Michael Graham	3,534	51.96	-3.84
Progressive Conservative	Aldeo Saulnier	3,060	44.99	+15.58
New Democratic	Graham Cox	208	3.06	-11.73
Total valid votes		6,802	100.0	
Total rejected ballots		73	1.06	
Turnout		6,875	75.74	
Eligible voters		9,077		
Liberal notional hold		Swing		-9.71

2003 New Brunswick general election
Party	Candidate	Votes	%	±%
Liberal	Shawn Graham	3,615	55.80	+3.49
Progressive Conservative	Valmond Daigle	1,905	29.41	-10.19
New Democratic	Jerry Cook	958	14.79	+8.35
Total valid votes		6,478	100.0	
Liberal hold		Swing		+6.84

1999 New Brunswick general election
Party	Candidate	Votes	%	±%
Liberal	Shawn Graham	3,264	52.31	-12.33
Progressive Conservative	Valmond Daigle	2,471	39.60	+27.57
New Democratic	Charles Richard	402	6.44	-16.89
Independent	J. R. Beers	103	1.65	
Total valid votes		6,240	100.0	
Liberal hold		Swing		-19.95

New Brunswick provincial by-election, October 19, 1998
Party	Candidate	Votes	%	±%
Liberal	Shawn Graham	4,045	64.64	-5.80
New Democratic	Amelia "Millie" Augustine	1,460	23.33	+8.60
Progressive Conservative	Everett Sanipass	753	12.03	+3.51
Total valid votes		6,258	100.0	
Liberal hold		Swing		-7.20

1995 New Brunswick general election
Party	Candidate	Votes	%	±%
Liberal	Alan Graham	4,318	70.44	
Progressive Conservative	Stéphane Comeau	903	14.73	
New Democratic	John LaBossiere	522	8.52	
Confederation of Regions	Percy R. Beers	387	6.31	
Total valid votes		6,130	100.0	
Liberal notional gain		Swing		

== See also ==
- List of New Brunswick provincial electoral districts
- Canadian provincial electoral districts
