= Department of Advanced Education and Labour (New Brunswick) =

The Department of Advanced Education and Labour was a part of the Government of New Brunswick. It was charged with the administration of post-secondary education and the enforcement of labour standards and facilitating relations between employers and employees in New Brunswick. The department took over the responsibilities of the Department of Labour and the Department of Advanced Education and Training in 1991. In 1998, the department's functions were split between the Department of Labour and the Department of Education.

== Ministers ==
#	Minister	Term	Government
1.	Vaughn Blaney	October 9, 1991 – April 27, 1994	under Frank McKenna
2.	Camille Thériault	April 27, 1994 – September 26, 1995	under Frank McKenna
3.	Roly MacIntyre	September 26, 1995 – October 13, 1997	under Frank McKenna
	Roly MacIntyre (cont'd)	October 13, 1997 – May 14, 1998	under Ray Frenette
