= Fernand Dubé =

Canadian lawyer and politician

Fernand G. Dubé QC
- Born: December 29, 1928; Edmundston, New Brunswick; Canada
- Died: October 5, 1999 (aged 70); Montreal, Quebec; Canada
- Education: University of Ottawa; University of New Brunswick
- Occupation: Lawyer
- Political party: Progressive Conservative
- Spouse: Monique Maltais
- Children: 4 children
- Parent(s): Paul-Léon Dubé& Lumina Lavoie

Fernand G. Dubé QC (December 29, 1928 – October 5, 1999) was a Canadian lawyer and politician in the Province of New Brunswick.

He graduated from the University of Ottawa in Ottawa and obtained a law degree from the University of New Brunswick in Fredericton. Dubé practised law in Campbellton, New Brunswick, and served as president of the Campbellton Tigers ice hockey club in 1970-71. The club's 1972 team was later inducted in the New Brunswick Sports Hall of Fame.

Fernand Dubé ran as the Progressive Conservative Party of Canada in the Restigouche—Madawaska, New Brunswick riding in the 1965 federal election, losing to Liberal incumbent, Jean-Eudes Dubé. Following the resignation of Charles Van Horne, in a September 1974 provincial by-election Dubé was elected to the Legislative Assembly of New Brunswick as the Progressive Conservative member for the riding of Campbellton-Restigouche Centre and would be re-elected in 1978, and again in 1982.

On December 3, 1974, Premier Richard Hatfield appointed Fernand Dubé to his Cabinet. During the ensuing thirteen years he held every major Cabinet portfolio. Dubé first served as the Minister of Tourism and Minister of the Environment, then on February 22, 1978, became Minister of Finance with the additional duty of Minister responsible for energy policy. After more than four and a half years in these portfolios, on October 30, 1982, he was appointed Minister of Justice then to his final Cabinet post on October 3, 1985, as the Minister of Commerce & Technology.

In the 1987 election, Fernand Dubé lost his seat to Liberal, Edmond Blanchard. On May 11, 1998, Dubé was elected Mayor of Campbellton. He died of a heart attack on October 4, 1999, in Montreal. Campbellton's City Hall park was named in his memory. His son, Jean F. Dubé, was elected to the House of Commons of Canada and the Legislative Assembly of New Brunswick.

New Brunswick provincial government of Richard Hatfield
Cabinet posts (5)
Predecessor	Office	Successor
Paul Dawson	Minister of Commerce & Technology; 1985–1987	Al W. Lacey
Rodman Logan	Minister of Justice; 1982–1985	David Clark
Lawrence Garvie	Minister of Finance; 1978–1982	John B. M. Baxter, Jr.
G. W. N. Cockburn	Minister of the Environment; 1974–1978	Eric Kipping
Jean-Paul LeBlanc	Minister of Tourism; 1974–1977	Leland McGraw
