= Edmond Blanchard =

Canadian jurist and politician

Edmond P. Blanchard QC
- Born: May 31, 1954; Atholville, New Brunswick, Canada
- Died: June 27, 2014 (aged 60); Ottawa, Ontario, Canada
- Education: Dalhousie University
- Occupations: Lawyer, judge, politician
- Political party: Liberal
- Parent(s): John E. Blanchard, Mary Rita Hughes

Edmond P. Blanchard QC (May 31, 1954 – June 27, 2014) was a Canadian jurist and politician.

Blanchard was born in Atholville, New Brunswick. He studied at Dalhousie University in Halifax, Nova Scotia where he earned a Bachelor of Commerce degree in 1975 and a Bachelor of Laws degree in 1978. He practised law in Campbellton, New Brunswick until 1987 when he was elected to the Legislative Assembly of New Brunswick in the 1987 general election as a member of the Liberal Party, which won every seat in the legislature. He joined the cabinet as the Minister of State for Mines in 1989 and, following his re-election in 1991, was appointed Minister of Justice and carried several other ministerial responsibilities. He was re-elected to a third term in the 1995 election and given the senior portfolio of finance minister.

His good looks, fluent bilingualism, and success as Minister of Finance made him a strong candidate to succeed Frank McKenna for the Liberal leadership in 1998. After announcing he was considering the possibility, he opted not to contest the leadership.

Blanchard continued in the finance ministry after Camille Thériault became Premier of New Brunswick and was re-elected to his Campbellton riding in 1999. He served briefly in opposition before being appointed to the Federal Court of Canada in 2000, shortly thereafter he also took a seat on the Court Martial Appeal Court of Canada. When the Federal Court of Canada was split into the Federal Court and the Federal Court of Appeal in 2003, he took a seat on the Federal Court while maintaining his post on the Court Martial Appeal Court.

In 2004, he became Chief Justice of the Court Martial appeals court and a member of the Canadian Judicial Council. He died in 2014 after almost ten years as a member of the council, where he served as a member of the Education Committee and the Judicial Conduct Committee.

Blanchard died on June 27, 2014, after a short illness.

New Brunswick provincial government of Camille Thériault
Cabinet post (1)
Predecessor	Office	Successor
himself in Frenette government	Minister of Finance; 1998–1999	Norman Betts
Special Cabinet Responsibilities
Predecessor	Title	Successor
himself in Frenette government	Minister of State for Quality; 1998–1999 designation discontinued	none
New Brunswick provincial government of Ray Frenette
Cabinet post (1)
Predecessor	Office	Successor
himself in McKenna government	Minister of Finance; 1997–1998	himself in Thériault government
Special Cabinet Responsibilities
Predecessor	Title	Successor
himself in McKenna government	Minister of State for Quality; 1997–1998	himself in Thériault government
New Brunswick provincial government of Frank McKenna
Cabinet posts (3)
Predecessor	Office	Successor
Allan Maher	Minister of Finance; 1995–1997	himself in Frenette government
James E. Lockyer	Minister of Justice and Attorney General; 1991–1995	Paul Duffie
Aldea Landry	Minister of Intergovernmental Affairs; 1991–1994	Roland Beaulieu
Special Cabinet Responsibilities
Predecessor	Title	Successor
none	Minister of State for Quality; 1995–1997 new designation	himself in Frenette government
?	Minister of State for Mines & Energy; 1989–1991	Doug Tyler

Preceded by Barry L. Strayer	Chief Justice of the Court Martial Appeal Court of Canada; 2004–2014	Succeeded by Dolores Hansen, Acting Chief Justice
