= Allison DeLong =

Canadian politician

MLA for Carleton Centre

Personal details
- Born: December 4, 1940 Bath, New Brunswick
- Died: April 14, 2014 (aged 73) Saint John, New Brunswick
- Party: New Brunswick Liberal Association

Allison Winston DeLong (December 4, 1940 - April 14, 2014) was a Canadian politician. He served in the Legislative Assembly of New Brunswick from 1987 to 1995, as a Liberal member for the constituency of Carleton Centre.

== Electoral record ==
1991 New Brunswick general election
Party	Candidate	Votes	%	±%
Liberal	Allison DeLong	2,087	42.95	-14.84
Progressive Conservative	Mary Hatfield	1,387	28.54	-9.88
Confederation of Regions	Lois M. Clark	1,281	26.36	–
New Democratic	Linda Marie Lawrence	104	2.14	-1.65
Total valid votes		4,859	100.0	
Liberal hold		Swing		-2.48

1987 New Brunswick general election
Party	Candidate	Votes	%	±%
Liberal	Allison DeLong	2,787	57.79	+12.57
Progressive Conservative	Richard B. Hatfield	1,853	38.42	-13.43
New Democratic	Kathryn Campbell	183	3.79	+0.86
Total valid votes		4,823	100.0	
Liberal gain from Progressive Conservative		Swing		+13.00
