= Susan Levi-Peters =

Canadian politician (born 1965)

Deputy Leader of the New Brunswick New Democratic Party
- Incumbent
- Assumed office March 2, 2011

Personal details
- Born: August 26, 1965 (age 60) Elsipogtog, New Brunswick
- Party: New Brunswick New Democratic Party
- Occupation: Deputy Leader, New Brunswick NDP, small business owner

Susan Levi-Peters (born August 26, 1965) is a Canadian politician from New Brunswick. Dominic Cardy, leader of the New Brunswick New Democratic Party, named her as his running mate and choice for Deputy Leader in the party's leadership election process ending on March 2, 2011. A resident of Elsipogtog, Levi-Peters was the party's candidate for the 2013 Kent byelection. During the 2015 Canadian federal election, she announced that she could no longer support the NDP and would be working to elect Liberals in the province.

== Political career ==
Levi-Peters served as chief of the Elsipogtog band council from 2004 to 2008, participating in the signing of the Bi-lateral Agreement between First Nation communities and the Government of New Brunswick in 2007. She has been involved in various First Nations organizations, and was a member of the Executive of the Atlantic Policy Congress. She served as the Social Development Director for Elsipogtog, Finance Comptroller for the North Shore District Council, and Supervisor for Big Cove Works.

In 2010, Levi-Peters was the New Brunswick New Democratic Party candidate for Kent finishing third with 15.3% of the vote. In 2011, Levi-Peters was the Federal NDP candidate for Beauséjour finishing third with 23.35% of the vote. In 2013, Levi-Peters was the New Brunswick New Democratic Party candidate for the Kent byelection finishing second with 26.94% of the vote.

In 2015, Levi-Peters announced that she could no longer support the NDP and would be working to elect Liberal candidates in New Brunswick such as Dominic Leblanc in the federal election that year.

== Electoral record ==
April 15, 2013 by-election: Kent
Party	Candidate	Votes	%	±%
Liberal	Brian Gallant	3543	59.10	+3.4
NDP	Susan Levi-Peters	1615	26.94	+11.64
Progressive Conservative	Jimmy Bourque	837	13.96	-11.74

2011 Canadian federal election
Party	Candidate	Votes	%	±%	Expenditures
Liberal	Dominic LeBlanc	17,399	39.08	-7.68	$60,854.20
Conservative	Evelyn Chapman	14,811	33.27	+4.12	$75,052.19
New Democratic	Susan Levi-Peters	10,397	23.35	+6.47	$13,825.57
Green	Natalie Arsenault	1,913	4.30	-2.89	
Total valid votes/Expense limit		44,520	100.00		
Total rejected ballots		534	1.19	-0.16	
Turnout		45,054	71.97	+2.77	
Eligible voters		62,599	–	–	

2010 New Brunswick election: Kent
Party	Candidate	Votes	%	±%
Liberal	Shawn Graham	3,722	55.7%	+3.8
Progressive Conservative	Bruce Hickey	1,720	25.7%	-19.3
NDP	Susan Levi-Peters	1,023	15.3%	+12.2
Green	Gary Sanipass	215	3.2%	**
