= Morris Vernon Green =

Canadian politician

Member of the Legislative Assembly of New Brunswick
- In office 1978–1991
- Preceded by: Sterling Hambrook
- Succeeded by: Brent Taylor
- Constituency: Southwest Miramichi

Personal details
- Born: c. 1942 (age 83–84) Astle's Crossing, New Brunswick
- Party: New Brunswick Liberal Association
- Spouse: Peggy Robichaud
- Children: 3
- Occupation: teacher

Morris Vernon Green (born c. 1942) is a retired history teacher and former politician in the Province of New Brunswick, Canada.

In 1960, he graduated from Upper Miramichi Regional High School in Boiestown, New Brunswick. He married Peggy Robichaud.

A member of the New Brunswick Liberal Association, in the 1978 provincial election, Morris Green was elected to the Legislative Assembly of New Brunswick as the representative for the Southwest Miramichi riding. He was reelected in 1982 and 1987 and on October 27, 1987 was appointed the Cabinet by Premier Frank McKenna as Minister of Natural Resources.

Green served in Cabinet until August 31, 1991 and did not seek reelection in that year's general election.

New Brunswick provincial government of Frank McKenna
Cabinet post (1)
Predecessor	Office	Successor
Malcolm MacLeod	'Minister of Lands and Mines'; 1987-1991	Alan R. Graham
