= L'Acayen =

Acadian neo-nationalist periodical (1972–1976)

L'Acayen was a neo-nationalist French-language political magazine published in Bathurst, New Brunswick, Canada, from 1972 to 1976. It was associated with Acadian neo-nationalism and shared political ideas with the Parti Acadien, although it was independent of the party. Towards the end of the publication it's editoral stance increasingly emphasized socialism and Marxism–Leninism.
