= Queens South =

Defunct provincial electoral district in New Brunswick, Canada

New Brunswick electoral district

Defunct provincial electoral district
- Legislature: Legislative Assembly of New Brunswick
- District created: 1973
- District abolished: 1994
- First contested: 1974
- Last contested: 1991

Queens South was a provincial electoral district in New Brunswick, Canada. It was created from the multi-member riding of Queens in the 1973 electoral redistribution, and was abolished in the 1994 electoral redistribution.

== Members of the Legislative Assembly ==
Assembly	Years	Member	Party
Riding created from Queens
48th	1974–1978	Robert Corbett	Progressive Conservative
49th	1978–1982	Robert McCready	Liberal
50th	1982–1987	Robert McCready	Progressive Conservative
51st	1987–1991	Vaughn Blaney	Liberal
52nd	1991–1995	Vaughn Blaney	Liberal
Riding dissolved into Grand Bay-Westfield, Grand Lake, New Maryland and Oromocto-Gagetown

== Election results ==
1991 New Brunswick general election
Party	Candidate	Votes	%	±%
Liberal	Vaughn Blaney	1,543	41.94	-15.27
Confederation of Regions	Jarvis M. Ducey	1,205	32.75	–
Progressive Conservative	Larry C. Black	676	18.37	-17.36
New Democratic	Gordon Black	255	6.93	-0.13
Total valid votes		3,679	100.0	
Liberal hold		Swing		-24.01

1987 New Brunswick general election
Party	Candidate	Votes	%	±%
Liberal	Vaughn Blaney	2,075	57.21	+15.53
Progressive Conservative	Robert B. McCready	1,296	35.73	-16.45
New Democratic	Susan Barton	256	7.06	+0.91
Total valid votes		3,627	100.0	
Liberal gain from Progressive Conservative		Swing		+15.99

1982 New Brunswick general election
Party	Candidate	Votes	%	±%
Progressive Conservative	Robert B. McCready	1,799	52.18	+7.34
Liberal	Dawn Bremner	1,437	41.68	-7.22
New Democratic	Mike Gormley	212	6.15	-0.11
Total valid votes		3,448	100.0	
Progressive Conservative gain from Liberal		Swing		+7.28
Progressive Conservative candidate Robert McCready gained 3.28 percentage points from his performance in 1978 running as a Liberal.

1978 New Brunswick general election
Party	Candidate	Votes	%	±%
Liberal	Robert B. McCready	1,577	48.90	+0.19
Progressive Conservative	A.P. Hetherington	1,446	44.84	-6.45
New Democratic	Charles Viger	202	6.26	–
Total valid votes		3,225	100.0	
Liberal gain from Progressive Conservative		Swing		+3.32

1974 New Brunswick general election
Party	Candidate	Votes	%
Progressive Conservative	Robert Corbett	1,528	51.29
Liberal	Robert B. McCready	1,451	48.71
Total valid votes		2,979	100.0
The previous multi-member riding of Queens elected one Progressive Conservative and one Liberal in the last election. Robert McCready was one of two incumbents.

== See also ==
- List of New Brunswick provincial electoral districts
- Canadian provincial electoral districts
