= 31st New Brunswick general election =

The 31st New Brunswick general election may refer to

- the 1903 New Brunswick general election, the 31st overall general election for New Brunswick, for the 31st New Brunswick Legislative Assembly, but considered the 11th general election for the Canadian province of New Brunswick, or
- the 1987 New Brunswick general election, the 51st overall general election for New Brunswick, for the 51st New Brunswick Legislative Assembly, but considered the 31st general election for the Canadian province of New Brunswick.
