= Gérald Clavette =

Canadian politician

Gérald Clavette (born May 9, 1941) is a New Brunswick politician. As a Liberal, he served in cabinet as chairman of the Board of Management from 1987 to 1991 and then as Minister of Agriculture in the government of Frank McKenna from October 9, 1991 to April 25, 1994.

Subsequently, he was the last Speaker of the New Brunswick Legislative Assembly to be appointed by the government rather than elected by a secret ballot. He was initially appointed by the government in the fall of 1994 during the 52nd New Brunswick Legislative Assembly after Speaker Shirley Dysart stepped down at the request of the government. Shortly thereafter the House adopted new rules to elect the speaker by secret ballot. Clavette resigned and did not seek office under the new rules so mrs. Dysart was elected by the assembly under the new rules for the balance of the life of the assembly.

Clavette was first elected to the New Brunswick legislature in the 1967 provincial election representing Madawaska. He was re-elected in six subsequent elections in 1970, 1974, 1978, 1982, 1987 and 1991 in what became Madawaska Centre and served until 1995 as an MLA when he was defeated in the riding of Madawaska-la-Vallée.

After leaving politics he served in a number of appointments. In 1997 he was appointed to the provincial forest products commission and also served as president of Enterprise Madawaska and chairman of the St. John Valley and Eastern Quebec Energy Committee.
