= 11th New Brunswick general election =

11th New Brunswick general election may refer to:

- New Brunswick general election, 1834-1835, the 11th general election to take place in the Colony of New Brunswick, for the 11th New Brunswick Legislative Assembly
- 1903 New Brunswick general election, the 31st overall general election for New Brunswick, for the 31st New Brunswick Legislative Assembly, but considered the 11th general election for the Canadian province of New Brunswick
