= John LaBossiere =

Canadian politician

Leader of the New Brunswick New Democratic Party
- In office 1976–1980
- Preceded by: J. Albert Richardson
- Succeeded by: George Little

Personal details
- Born: January 1, 1935
- Died: January 11, 2006 (aged 71)
- Party: New Brunswick New Democratic Party

John B. LaBossiere (January 1, 1935 – January 11, 2006) was a Canadian politician who was leader of the New Brunswick New Democratic Party from 1976 to 1980. The party's first francophone leader, he was noted for making inroads into the province's Acadian community, taking the party to a then-record level of support in the 1978 provincial election. He was also an early advocate of environmentalism in the province, building his campaign on opposition to aerial spraying and to the proposed Point Lepreau Nuclear Generating Station. He resigned as leader in July 1980, following a dispute with the party's executive committee, complaining that the NDP had drifted from its socialist principles.

A teacher by profession, he taught at the Bonar Law High School in Rexton, New Brunswick, and was married to Ferne (Fearon) LaBossiere, a native of Tide Head, New Brunswick. He was a graduate of the University of New Brunswick. LaBossiere was active in many community organizations and deeply committed to many causes. He was elected and served on the Rexton-Richibucto school board for many years.

He ran for the Legislative Assembly of New Brunswick in the 1978 and 1995 elections.
