= Frank E. Kane =

Canadian politician

Member of the Legislative Assembly of New Brunswick
- In office 1969–1982
- Preceded by: none, first member
- Succeeded by: Frank McKenna
- Constituency: Chatham

Personal details
- Born: August 4, 1932 Chatham, New Brunswick
- Died: November 16, 2025 (aged 93)
- Party: New Brunswick Liberal Association
- Spouse: Carole Frances Searle
- Children: 3
- Occupation: insurance agent

Frank Edward Kane (August 4, 1932 – November 16, 2025) was a Canadian politician. He served in the Legislative Assembly of New Brunswick from 1969 to 1982 as a Liberal member from the constituency of Chatham.
