= Evérard Daigle =

Canadian politician (1925–2022)

Evérard H. Daigle

MLA for Grand Falls
- In office 1974–1987
- Succeeded by: Paul Duffie

Personal details
- Born: December 2, 1925 Saint-Léonard, New Brunswick
- Died: March 2, 2022 (aged 96) Grand Falls, New Brunswick
- Party: New Brunswick Liberal Association
- Spouse: Jeannette Dionne (m. 1948; died 2003)
- Occupation: Businessman

Evérard H. Daigle (December 2, 1925 – March 2, 2022) was a Canadian politician. He served in the Legislative Assembly of New Brunswick from 1974 to 1987, as a French-speaking Liberal member for the constituency of Grand Falls. He was named to the Order of New Brunswick in 2010.

== Early life and business career ==
Daigle was born in Saint-Léonard, New Brunswick, in 1925, the son of Henri Daigle and Eva Albert. After completing his secondary schooling, he attended Collège Saint-Joseph in Memramcook, earning a bachelor's degree in commerce in 1949. He briefly worked as an accountant in Saint John before becoming a manager with New Brunswick Power in Grand Falls.

In 1952, Daigle founded Daigle Motors Ltd. and became a Chrysler dealer. In 1965, on the site of his car dealership, he opened the first Canadian Tire store in the region, which he owned until 1981. During the 1950s and 1960s he also operated a potato farm and a sawmill, Valley Lumber Ltd., a major regional employer. In 1972 he completed his largest business project, the construction of the Grand Falls Shopping Centre, which he owned until 1987.

== Honours ==
In 1973, Daigle was named "Personality of the Year" and made a lifetime member of the Grand Falls Gorge Commission for his role in promoting the falls and gorge as a tourist attraction. In April 1988 the town of Grand Falls renamed a street in his honour, now known as Boulevard Évérard-Daigle. He was named to the Order of New Brunswick in 2010 for his contributions to the town and province.

== Personal life ==
Daigle's first wife, Jeannette Dionne, whom he married in 1948, died in 2003; he later remarried, to Florence (Castonguay) McCluskey. On March 2, 2022, at the age of 96.
