= Vaughn Blaney =

Canadian politician (born 1938)

Member of the Legislative Assembly of New Brunswick
- In office 1987–1999
- Constituency: Queens South (1987–95); Oromocto-Gagetown (1995–99)

Personal details
- Born: August 13, 1938 (age 87) Saint John, New Brunswick
- Party: New Brunswick Liberal Association
- Spouse: Diana Le Blanc
- Children: 4
- Occupation: educator

Vaughn Blaney (born August 13, 1938) is a former educator and political figure in New Brunswick, Canada. He represented Queens South and then Oromocto-Gagetown in the Legislative Assembly of New Brunswick from 1987 to 1999 as a Liberal member.

He was born in Saint John, New Brunswick and was educated at the University of Moncton and University of New Brunswick. Blaney was a teacher and principal. He also served as mayor of Gagetown. Blaney was Minister of Municipal Affairs and Environment from 1987 to 1989, Minister of Environment from 1989 to 1991 and from 1995 to 1997, Minister of Advanced Education and Labour from 1991 to 1994, and Minister of Education and Minister of State for Youth from 1994 to 1995.

In August 2005, Blaney was named to head an inquiry into the use of Agent Orange at CFB Gagetown; in October of that year, Blaney resigned, citing health reasons.
