= Parti acadien =

Defunct political party in New Brunswick, Canada

The Parti Acadien was a political party in New Brunswick, Canada in the 1970s and 1980s. The party was founded in 1972 by Acadians who were upset over poorer living conditions in predominantly francophone areas of the province versus those areas dominated by anglophones. The economy of New Brunswick was concentrated in the cities of Fredericton, Saint John and Moncton, while the eastern and northern parts of New Brunswick, predominantly Francophone, was relatively poorer as a result of an economy based primarily on entrenched and seasonal commercial fishing and lumber industries.

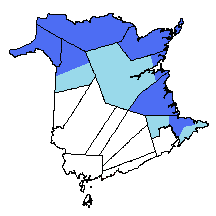
Approximate map of an Acadian province. In light blue, the areas of New Brunswick with a significant proportion of Francophones. In dark blue, the areas with a Francophone majority.

Despite efforts by Louis Robichaud, an Acadian who served as the province's premier between the 1960 and 1970 elections, to modernize through investment in education and business promotion by instituting what was called an equal opportunity program, some Acadians felt they would be better served by their own administration. As a result, the Parti Acadien advocated the formation of a separate Acadian province within Canada, a proposition that would require an amendment to the Canadian Constitution following a provincial referendum.

The Parti Acadien tried to distance itself from its more radical elements, even hesitating to use the word "nationalist". Their platform had several socialist policies, though officially their goal was to work for reforms using the already-existing framework of New Brunswick law. They also explained that they were not anti-anglophone per se, but felt that the capitalist system in place in the province favoured the predominantly English south. Many of the radicals joined a new cultural organization, the Société Acadienne du Nouveau-Brunswick (SANB). Euclide Chiasson was the party's first president and leader. The party nominated 13 candidates in the province's 58 ridings in the 1974 provincial election, 23 candidates in the 1978 provincial election, and 10 candidates in the 1982 provincial election, which was the party's last.

The party considered an alliance or merger with the New Brunswick New Democratic Party (NDP), encouraging voters in ridings with no Parti Acadien candidate to vote for the NDP instead. No formal agreement was ever reached.

In 1975, Jean-Pierre Lanteigne was elected leader. He sought to abandon demands for a new Acadian province, instead maintaining a social democratic agenda for New Brunswick as a whole. This caused a rift in the party, with some members hoping that the success of the sovereigntist Parti Québécois in the Province of Quebec would spark hopes for Acadian nationalism as well. Lanteigne insisted, however, that his party was not a New Brunswick branch of the Parti Québécois.

== 1978 provincial election ==
The Parti Acadien decided once again to support the creation of a separate province, in tandem with most (but not all) SANB members. The party went into the 1978 election with a platform of independence. However, Richard Hatfield and the governing Progressive Conservatives also promoted a platform that promised to increase the role of the Acadian people and culture within the province.

The party's platform was seen as vague during the election, so it subsequently clarified its positions. The party stood for in decentralization of provincial powers and French-language administrative units across the province. A convention of Parti Acadien supporters, SANB members and other Acadians in 1979 produced a split on the issue of whether to vote to secede from New Brunswick or work for reform from within. The SANB (still a cultural association at the core) risked having its funding from the Government of Canada cut off before it explained that the convention produced no consensus and was not binding.

The 1978 election was the Parti Acadien's most successful. Their candidates averaged 12% of the vote, and Restigouche West candidate Armand Plourde finished second, only 170 votes short of first place. This was the party's only second-place finish, and the closest it came to winning a seat. In the election the Liberal Party led by Acadian Joseph Daigle garnered 44.36% of the popular vote, just .03% less than the winning Progressive Conservatives and captured twenty-eight seats to the Conservative Party's thirty. The votes that went to the Parti Acadien traditionally had gone to the Liberals and it was widely believed that the Parti acadien cost the Liberals the election.

In 1980, the majority of the SANB membership votes in favour of promoting secession. As a result, it lost funding from both the federal and provincial governments, who feared that radicals had taken over the group (and by extension, the Parti Acadien). The more centrist factions of the party jumped ship, mostly to the Conservatives.

By the 1982 election, the Conservatives' policies on francophone rights resonated with Acadian voters, and Hatfield's party won an unprecedented number of Acadian seats. Hatfield's overtures to the Acadians did not sit well with many anglophone New Brunswickers; they later founded the New Brunswick Confederation of Regions Party, whose platform called for English as the only official language in New Brunswick. The Parti Acadien lost 75% of its support from 1978, and officially disbanded in 1986.

== Leaders of the Parti acadien ==
- Euclide Chiasson 1972-1975
- Jean-Pierre Lanteigne 1975-1979
- Donatien Gaudet 1979-1980
- Louise Blanchard 1980-1982

== See also ==
- List of New Brunswick political parties
- Secessionist movements of Canada

== Sources ==
- The Rise and Fall of the Parti Acadien by Monique Gauvin and Lizette Jalbert. Canadian Parliamentary Review, vol. 10 no. 3, 1987.
