= Conrad Landry =

Canadian politician (1938–2022)

MLA for Kent South
- In office 1978–1995
- Preceded by: Joseph Daigle
- Succeeded by: district abolished

Personal details
- Born: 1938 Memramcook, New Brunswick, Canada
- Died: October 29, 2022 (aged 83) Moncton, New Brunswick, Canada
- Party: New Brunswick Liberal Association
- Spouse: Blanche
- Occupation: Teacher

Conrad Landry (1938 – October 29, 2022) was a Canadian politician. He served in the Legislative Assembly of New Brunswick from 1982 to 1995, as a Liberal member for the constituency of Kent North. Landry died in 2022 at the age of 83.
