= Joseph Daigle (New Brunswick politician) =

Canadian lawyer and politician

The Honourable Joseph Daigle CM KC

Chief Justice of New Brunswick
- In office 1998–2003
- Preceded by: William L. Hoyt
- Succeeded by: J. Ernest Drapeau

MLA for Kent North
- In office 1974–1982
- Preceded by: Riding established
- Succeeded by: Conrad Landry

Personal details
- Born: Joseph Zénon Daigle; June 23, 1934 (age 92) Saint-Charles, New Brunswick, Canada
- Party: Liberal
- Spouse: Rhéa April
- Children: 4 children
- Parent(s): Antoine J. Daigle & Laura Daigle
- Education: St. Joseph's College, University of New Brunswick, University of Paris
- Occupation: Lawyer, judge, politician

Joseph Zénon Daigle, CM KC (born June 23, 1934) is a Canadian lawyer and a former politician and Chief Justice of New Brunswick.

== Early life and education ==
Of Acadian descent, Daigle was born in Saint-Charles, New Brunswick, and educated in his native province. He received a Bachelor of Arts degree from St. Joseph's College and a Bachelor of Civil Law degree from the University of New Brunswick before he studied public international law at the University of Paris in France. He entered private practise in 1960 and served as a provincial court judge from 1967 to 1974, when he entered politics.

== Political career ==
In the 1974 New Brunswick general election, Daigle was elected to the Legislative Assembly as the Liberal Party candidate for the newly created riding of Kent North. In 1978 he became leader of the provincial Liberal party and assumed the role of Opposition Leader in the Assembly.

In the 1978 election, Daigle was personally reelected while leading his party to a narrow loss. His Liberals garnered 44.36 per cent of the popular vote, just 0.03 per cent less than the winning Progressive Conservatives, and captured twenty-eight seats to the Conservative's thirty. Dissension arose within his caucus following the party's election loss in which 3.5 per cent of the popular vote went to the Parti Acadien, a party made up mainly of disgruntled former Liberals. He also attracted criticism for a campaign speech in which he referred to Premier Richard Hatfield as a "faded pansy", alluding to the Conservative leader's then-rumoured homosexuality.

== Judicial career ==
Daigle resigned as leader and withdrew from political life, returning to the practice of law. In 1982, he was appointed Judge of the Court of Queen's Bench of New Brunswick and was named its Chief Justice in 1994. He was appointed Chief Justice of New Brunswick in 1998, serving until 2003 when he was elected supernumerary status.

== Retirement and later life ==
In 2004, the Government of Canada appointed Daigle as chair of its Miramichi and Acadie—Bathurst Electoral Boundaries Commission that successfully dealt with what had become a contentious political issue.

In December 2015, he was appointed as a Member of the Order of Canada.

Legal offices
Preceded by William L. Hoyt	Chief Justice of New Brunswick; 1998–2003	Succeeded by J. Ernest Drapeau
Legislative Assembly of New Brunswick
Preceded by Robert J. Higgins	Opposition Leader in the New Brunswick Legislature; 1978–1981	Succeeded by Doug Young
Preceded by Robert J. Higgins	Leader of the New Brunswick Liberals; 1978–1981	Doug Young
Preceded by New riding	MLA for Kent North; 1974–1982	Conrad Landry
