= Nancy Teed =

Canadian politician (1949–1993)

The Honourable Nancy Teed

Senator from Saint John
- In office 1990 – January 29, 1993
- Appointed by: Brian Mulroney

Member of the Legislative Assembly of New Brunswick for Saint John South
- In office 1978–1987

Personal details
- Born: February 26, 1949 Saint John, New Brunswick, Canada
- Died: January 29, 1993 (aged 43) near Oromocto, New Brunswick
- Party: Progressive Conservative
- Spouse: W Teed
- Cabinet: Provincial: * Minister of Social Services * Minister of Health and Community Services * Minister responsible for the Alcoholism and Drug Dependency Commission

Nancy Elizabeth Teed (February 26, 1949 – January 29, 1993) was a Canadian politician.

Born in Saint John, New Brunswick, she was elected to Legislative Assembly of New Brunswick in the riding of Saint John South in the 1978 election. A Progressive Conservative, she was re-elected in 1982. She held three positions in the cabinet of Richard Hatfield: Minister of Social Services, Minister of Health and Community Services, and Minister responsible for the Alcoholism and Drug Dependency Commission.

She was summoned to the Senate of Canada in 1990 representing the senatorial division of Saint John, NB sitting as a Progressive Conservative.

Teed was killed in a car accident on New Brunswick Route 7 near Geary, New Brunswick on January 29, 1993, while in office as Senator. Her funeral was held at Trinity Anglican Church in Saint John, New Brunswick.
