= Shirley Dysart =

Canadian politician (1928–2016)

The Honourable Shirley Dysart CM

New Brunswick Leader of the Opposition
- In office 1985 – May 4, 1985
- Preceded by: Ray Frenette
- Succeeded by: Frank McKenna

MLA for Saint John North
- In office November 18, 1974 – October 23, 1978
- Succeeded by: District abolished

MLA for Saint John Park
- In office October 23, 1978 – September 11, 1995
- Preceded by: Robert J. Higgins
- Succeeded by: District abolished

Personal details
- Born: Shirley Theresa Britt; February 22, 1928 Boston, Massachusetts, United States
- Died: December 14, 2016 (aged 88) Saint John, New Brunswick, Canada
- Party: Liberal
- Spouse: H. Eric Dysart
- Children: 1

Shirley Theresa Dysart CM (née Britt, February 22, 1928 – December 14, 2016) was an American-born Canadian teacher and a politician in the province of New Brunswick.

She attained a number of "firsts" in New Brunswick politics. She was the first female Liberal in serve in the Legislative Assembly of New Brunswick, the first woman to serve as the leader of a party in the provincial Legislature (1985), the first woman to be Minister of Education (1987–1991) and first woman to be Speaker (1991–1995).

== Early years ==
Shirley Theresa Britt was born into an Irish Catholic family in Boston, Massachusetts in 1928, the eldest of eight children born to Canadians Leslie John Britt and Mary Agnes (née Donovan) Britt. Her parents were both born in Saint John, New Brunswick, Canada, and in May 1927 they traveled to Waltham, Massachusetts to stay with a cousin. They returned to Canada when Shirley was still a baby, and she was followed by seven more children: Daniel, Raymond, Kenny, Shirley Joan, Anne, John and Gerald. She often cared for her younger siblings while her parents worked.

Shirley and her siblings, fifth-generation residents of Saint John, grew up in Saint John's East Side in the Cathedral Parish, where they attended public schools and St. Vincent's High School. Upon graduating she studied at the New Brunswick Teachers' College and the University of New Brunswick. She was awarded a Beaverbrook Scholarship and studied at the University of London.

== Career ==
After graduating college, Dysart taught at her high school alma mater, St. Vincent's High School in Saint John. In 1967 she became a member of the school board for District 20. She later served as chair of the board for three years, the first woman to hold the position.

In 1974 the leader of the Liberal Party, Bob Higgins, suggested she run for a seat in the Legislative Assembly of New Brunswick; she won the seat of Saint John North, becoming the first female Liberal, and second female of any party, to serve in the Legislative Assembly. In 1976, she served on the Bi-Centennial Celebration Committee for the Province of New Brunswick.

Dysart was re-elected in 1978, 1982, 1987 and 1991, holding her seat for twenty years. She remains the only Liberal politician to win five consecutive elections in Saint John.

In 1985, she was appointed the interim Leader of the Opposition, becoming the first woman to serve as the Leader of a political party in New Brunswick. Following the 1987 election, she was appointed Minister of Education, becoming the first woman to hold the position. While serving as Minister of Education, she led the introduction of a province-wide universal, full-day public kindergarten program, becoming known as the "architect" of the province's kindergarten system. She was also responsible for a number of community projects in St. John, including the rebuilding of the Imperial Theatre.

In 1991, Dysart was elected Speaker of the Legislative Assembly, the first woman to hold the position. She retired from politics in 1995, not seeking re-election in the general election of that year.

In addition to her political career, Dysart held a number of community leadership positions. She was president of the Catholic Women's League Council, president of the University of New Brunswick Alumni Council, and a member of the board of governors of the Beaverbrook Art Gallery. She served on the boards of the New Brunswick Music Festival, Theatre New Brunswick, the University of New Brunswick Alumni Council, Saint John Family Services, and the Irish-Canadian Cultural Association.

== Honors and awards ==
In October 1996 Dysart was awarded an honorary LLD by the University of New Brunswick Saint John, and in 2000, she received a Red Cross Humanitarian Award. She was made a Member of the Order of Canada in 2004. In 2012 she was a recipient of the Queen Elizabeth II Diamond Jubilee Medal.

In 2015 she was named a Champion of Public Education by the national educational charity The Learning Partnership. She was also the recipient of the Commemorative Medal for the 125th Anniversary of the Confederation of Canada, and the Paul Harris Fellowship from the Rotary Club of Saint John.

== Personal life ==
Dysart was married to H. Eric Dysart and had one son, J. E. Britt Dysart.

Dysart died "after a period of failing health" on December 14, 2016, at the age of 88. She was survived by her son, daughter-in-law, and two grandchildren, as well as two sisters, two brothers, and a large extended family. Following her death, flags at Saint John City Hall were flown at half-staff as a sign of respect.
