= Robert McCready =

Canadian politician

Robert Black McCready (October 28, 1921 – November 3, 1995) was a restaurateur and political figure in New Brunswick, Canada. He was a member of the Legislative Assembly of New Brunswick, representing Queen's County from 1967 to 1974 as a Liberal member and then Queens South from 1978 to 1987 as a Progressive Conservative Progressive Conservative MLA.

He was born in Shannon, New Brunswick. In 1945, and married Kathleen Adelia Jones. He served as speaker for the Legislative Assembly from 1967 until 1970 and again from 1978 until 1982. McCready was Minister of Transportation in the province's Executive Council from 1985 to 1987.
