= John B. M. Baxter Jr. =

Canadian politician (1924–2000)

MLA for Kings West Kings from 1962 to 1974
- In office 1962–1987
- Preceded by: ?
- Succeeded by: Laureen Jarrett

Attorney General of New Brunswick
- In office 1970–1974
- Preceded by: B. A. Jean
- Succeeded by: Paul Creaghan

New Brunswick finance minister
- In office 1982–1987
- Preceded by: Fernand Dubé
- Succeeded by: Allan Maher

Personal details
- Born: November 4, 1924; Saint John, New Brunswick
- Died: March 9, 2000 (aged 75); Saint John, New Brunswick
- Political party: Progressive Conservative
- Spouse: Sally (Black) Baxter
- Children: Kirk, Keltie and Rahno
- Occupation: lawyer

John Babington Macaulay Baxter, Junior (November 4, 1924 – March 9, 2000) known as J.B.M. Baxter Jr. and Jack Baxter, was a politician in New Brunswick, Canada. He served as minister of a variety of portfolios under Premier of New Brunswick Richard Hatfield. His father, John Babington Macaulay Baxter, was premier from 1925 to 1931. He died in Saint John in 2000.
