= George Little (New Brunswick politician) =

Scottish-Canadian teacher and politician (1937–2021)

Leader of the New Brunswick New Democratic Party
- In office 1980–1988

Personal details
- Born: May 22, 1937 Bellshill, Scotland
- Died: May 15, 2021 (aged 83) Saint John, New Brunswick, Canada
- Party: New Democratic
- Spouse: Pearl Floey Cassels (m. 1959)
- Children: 2
- Occupation: teacher, politician

George Little (May 22, 1937 – May 15, 2021) was a Scottish-Canadian teacher and politician. He served as leader of the New Brunswick New Democratic Party (NDP) from 1980 to 1988.

== Early life ==
Little was born in Bellshill, Scotland, on May 22, 1937, one of five children of George Sr. and Mary (Wyper). He started his teaching career in Oban, before relocating to South Yemen and Saudi Arabia. He and his family immigrated to Saint John, New Brunswick, Canada in 1964.

== Career ==
Little was head of the English department at Simonds High School for more than three decades. He was also the author of many published poems and short stories. One of his books of short stories, The Many Deaths of George Robertson, was published by Goose Lane Editions in 1990.

=== Politics ===
Little was elected leader of the provincial NDP in 1980. During the provincial election two years later, the party ran on the platform of creating 17,000 jobs during their first year in power, a bill of rights for workers, affordable housing, cheaper energy, and the amelioration of education, healthcare, and transportation. A staunch advocate for environmental controls, Little was of the opinion that nuclear power was "expensive, risky, and not even necessary for our own power needs". He stated that the construction of the Point Lepreau Nuclear Generating Station "was a mistake, and we're determined that the same mistake should not be made again", in light of the four heavy water spills that occurred there during its first six months of operation. However, he was forced to make a key concession to his party – who risked losing some of its traditional votes over the issue – which took a neutral stance on nuclear energy. Under his leadership, the NDP received more than 10% of the province-wide vote for the first time and won seats in the legislative assembly for the first time. It ultimately gained two seats, although one of their members of the Legislative Assembly (MLA) ended up defecting to the Liberals.

Little himself ran in the electoral district of Kings West in the 1978, 1982 and 1987 provincial elections, but failed to win a seat. He stepped down as leader in 1988. He also ran for the federal New Democratic Party in Fundy Royal in the 1980 federal election, but was defeated by Robert Corbett of the Progressive Conservative Party.

== Personal life ==
Little married Pearl Floey (Cassels) in 1958. They remained married for 62 years until his death. Together, they had two children: Jacqueline and Alison.

Little died on May 15, 2021, at Saint John Regional Hospital in Saint John, New Brunswick. He was 83 years old.
