= Ray Frenette =

Premier of New Brunswick from 1997 to 1998

28th Premier of New Brunswick
- In office October 14, 1997 – May 14, 1998
- Monarch: Elizabeth II
- Lieutenant Governor: Marilyn T. Counsell
- Preceded by: Frank McKenna
- Succeeded by: Camille Thériault

MLA for Moncton East
- In office November 18, 1974 – June 30, 1998
- Preceded by: District created
- Succeeded by: Bernard Lord

Personal details
- Born: Joseph Raymond Frenette; April 16, 1935 Beresford, New Brunswick, Canada
- Died: July 13, 2018 (aged 83) Moncton, New Brunswick, Canada
- Party: Liberal
- Spouse: Armande Hachey

Joseph Raymond Frenette (April 16, 1935 – July 13, 2018) was a Canadian politician in New Brunswick. He was a Liberal representative for the riding of Moncton East in the Legislative Assembly of New Brunswick from 1974 until 1998 when he retired after a short term as the 28th premier of New Brunswick.

== Life and career ==
Frenette was born on April 16, 1935 in Beresford, New Brunswick, the son of Berthilde Pitre and Samuel Frenette. He attended the Collège du Sacré-Coeur in Bathurst. Before his election to the legislature, he was a Councillor for the village of Lewisville and, after Lewisville was amalgamated with the city of Moncton, he was a Moncton city Councillor.

He twice ran for leader of the New Brunswick Liberals. He lost in 1982 to Doug Young, and in 1985 to Frank McKenna. He served as interim leader of the party from 1983 to 1985 and again from October 1997 to May 1998, also serving as Premier.

Frenette was Frank McKenna's right-hand man in the legislature, serving as his House Leader throughout his tenure as leader from 1985 to 1997. He resigned from the New Brunswick legislature in July 1998.

Following his political career, Frenette was appointed by Prime Minister Jean Chrétien to be a director of Atomic Energy of Canada Limited (AECL) for a three-year term from 1998 to 2001 following which he served as chair from 2001 to 2005.

On May 11, 2006, it was announced that he would be New Brunswick chair of Gerard Kennedy's campaign for the leadership of the Liberal Party of Canada.

On July 13, 2018, Frenette died at the Dr. Georges-L.-Dumont University Hospital Centre in Moncton, aged 83.

New Brunswick provincial government of Ray Frenette
Cabinet posts (2)
Predecessor	Office	Successor
Frank McKenna	Premier of New Brunswick; 1997–1998	Camille Thériault
himself in McKenna government	President of the Executive Council; 1997–1998	Camille Thériault
New Brunswick provincial government of Frank McKenna
Cabinet posts (4)
Predecessor	Office	Successor
Frank McKenna	President of the Executive Council; 1995–1997	himself in Frenette government
Roland Beaulieu	Minister of Intergovernmental and Aboriginal Affairs; 1995–1997	Bernard Thériault
Al Lacey	Chairman of the New Brunswick Power Corporation; 1991–1995	chairman no longer a cabinet member
Nancy Teed	Minister of Health and Community Services; 1987–1991	Russ King
Special Cabinet Responsibilities
Predecessor	Title	Successor
Marcelle Mersereau	Deputy Premier of New Brunswick; 1995–1997	Alan R. Graham
Malcolm MacLeod	Government House Leader; 1987–1997	Doug Tyler
Party political offices
Preceded by Frank McKenna	Leader of the Liberal Party of New Brunswick; 1997–1998 (interim)	Succeeded by Camille Thériault
Preceded by Doug Young	Leader of the Opposition in the Legislative Assembly of New Brunswick; 1983–1985	Succeeded by Shirley Dysart
Preceded by Doug Young	Leader of the Liberal Party of New Brunswick; 1983–1985 (interim)	Succeeded by Shirley Dysart
Legislative Assembly of New Brunswick
Preceded by none, new district	Member of the New Brunswick Legislature for Moncton East; 1974–1998	Succeeded by Bernard Lord
