= Doug Young (politician) =

Canadian politician (born 1940)

Meredith Douglas Young, PC (born September 20, 1940 in Tracadie, New Brunswick) is a Canadian politician both provincial and federal spanning two decades.

== Provincial politics ==
He was first elected to the Legislative Assembly of New Brunswick in 1978 as a Liberal Member of the Legislative Assembly (MLA). He was elected leader of the New Brunswick Liberal Party in 1982, but resigned within a year of his rising to that post due to a poor showing in the 1982 provincial election. When the Liberals formed a government under Frank McKenna in 1987, Young served as Minister of Fisheries.

== Federal politics ==
Young left provincial politics to run in the 1988 federal election for the Liberal Party of Canada, and was elected to the House of Commons of Canada as a Liberal Member of Parliament (MP).

With the election of a Liberal government in the 1993 election, the new Prime Minister, Jean Chrétien, appointed Young to the Canadian cabinet as Minister of Transport. In that position, Young privatized Canada's air navigation system, creating Nav Canada, eliminated the Crow Rate which regulated the cost western farmers had to pay to transport their goods via rail, and privatized the Canadian National Railway.

In January 1996, he became Minister of Employment and Immigration (subsequently retitled Minister of Human Resources Development) and Minister of Labour. In October 1996, he was appointed Minister of National Defence and Minister of Veterans Affairs.

As Defence Minister, Young generated much criticism when, in 1997, he suspended the formal inquiry into the Somalia Affair in which Canadian troops had been accused of mistreating prisoners in Somalia in 1993.

In one of the chief upsets of the 1997 election, Young was defeated in his riding by Yvon Godin of the New Democratic Party. The Liberal government's changes to Unemployment Insurance were a key factor in his defeat because of the large number of seasonal workers in Young's riding. This was also a factor in the defeat of Young's Cabinet colleague and fellow Maritimer David Dingwall.

Since his defeat, Young has worked in Ottawa as a lobbyist. Despite his Liberal affiliations, Young supported the candidacy of Tom Long to lead the right-wing Canadian Alliance in that party's leadership election in 2000.

He supported Stéphane Dion for the leadership of the Liberal Party.

== Electoral record ==
1993 Canadian federal election: Acadie—Bathurst
Party	Candidate	Votes	%	±%	Expenditures
Liberal	Doug Young	26,782	66.35	+14.60	$45,888
Progressive Conservative	Luce-Andrée Gauthier	11,175	27.69	-15.04	$53,402
New Democratic	Kim Gallant	2,406	5.96	+0.43	$1,508
Total valid votes/expense limit		40,363	100.00	$53,496	
Liberal hold		Swing	+14.8		

1988 Canadian federal election: Gloucester
Party	Candidate	Votes	%	±%
Liberal	Doug Young	20,251	51.75	+13.37
Progressive Conservative	Jean Gauvin	16,721	42.73	-12.39
New Democratic	Serge Robichaud	2,163	5.53	+0.40
Total valid votes		39,135	100.00	
Liberal gain from Progressive Conservative.		Swing	+12.88	

26th Canadian Ministry (1993–2003) – Cabinet of Jean Chrétien
Cabinet posts (5)
Predecessor	Office	Successor
David Collenette	Minister of National Defence; 1996–1997	Art Eggleton
David Collenette	Minister of Veterans Affairs; 1996–1997 styled as Minister of National Defence	Fred Mifflin
legislation enacted	Minister of Human Resources Development; 1996	Pierre Pettigrew
Lloyd Axworthy	Minister of Employment and Immigration; 1996 styled as Minister of Human Resources Development	legislation enacted
Jean Corbeil	Minister of Transport; 1993–1996	David Anderson
Parliament of Canada
Preceded by Roger Clinch, PC	Member of Parliament from Acadie—Bathurst; 1988-1997	Succeeded by Yvon Godin, NDP
