= Frank McKenna =

Premier of New Brunswick from 1987 to 1997

The Honourable Frank McKenna PC OC ONB KC
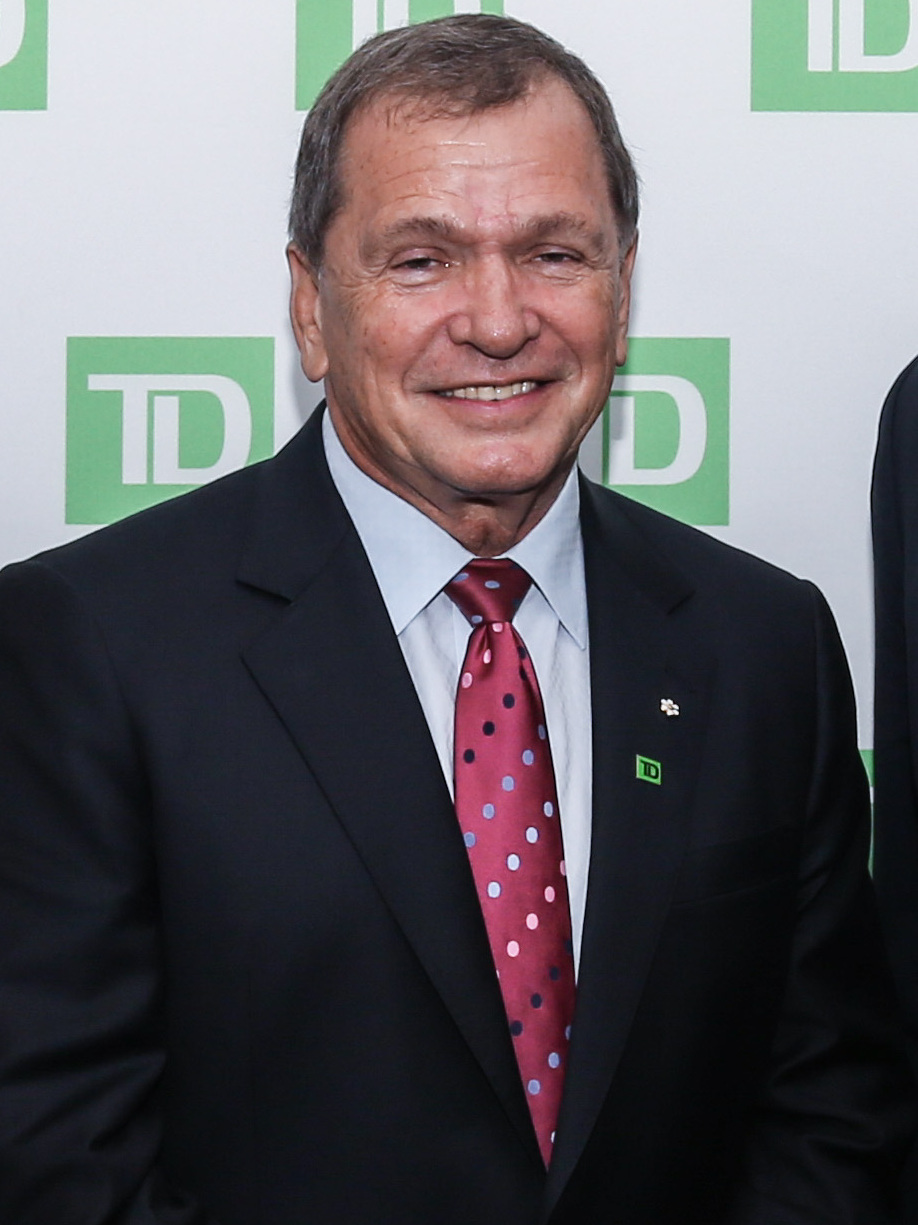
- McKenna in 2018

Canadian Ambassador to the United States
- In office March 8, 2005 – March 13, 2006
- Monarch: Elizabeth II
- Preceded by: Michael Kergin
- Succeeded by: Michael Wilson

27th Premier of New Brunswick
- In office October 27, 1987 – October 14, 1997
- Monarch: Elizabeth II
- Lieutenant Governor: Gilbert Finn; Margaret McCain; Marilyn T. Counsell
- Preceded by: Richard Hatfield
- Succeeded by: Ray Frenette

New Brunswick Leader of the Opposition
- In office May 4, 1985 – October 27, 1987
- Preceded by: Shirley Dysart
- Succeeded by: Camille Thériault

Leader of the New Brunswick Liberal Association
- In office May 4, 1985 – October 13, 1997
- Preceded by: Shirley Dysart
- Succeeded by: Ray Frenette (interim); Camille Thériault

MLA for Chatham
- In office October 12, 1982 – September 11, 1995
- Preceded by: Frank E. Kane
- Succeeded by: District abolished

MLA for Miramichi-Bay du Vin
- In office September 11, 1995 – October 13, 1997
- Preceded by: District created
- Succeeded by: James Doyle

Personal details
- Born: Francis Joseph McKenna; 19 January 1948 (age 78) Apohaqui, New Brunswick, Canada
- Party: Liberal
- Spouse: Julie Friel (1972-present);
- Children: 3
- Education: St. Francis Xavier University; University of New Brunswick

Francis Joseph McKenna (born January 19, 1948) is a Canadian businessman and former politician and diplomat. He is currently Chair of Brookfield Corporation and Deputy Chairman of the Toronto-Dominion Bank. He served as Canadian Ambassador to the United States from 2005 to 2006. He served as the 27th premier of New Brunswick from 1987 to 1997, winning every seat in the province in his first election.

== Early life ==
Frank McKenna was born on January 19, 1948, in Apohaqui, New Brunswick, one of eight children of Olive and Joseph McKenna. McKenna was raised in his grandparents' home. They lived adjacent to his parents as his large family could not be wholly housed in his parents' home.

Raised Catholic, after completing Sussex High School (in Sussex, New Brunswick), he completed a bachelor's degree in Political Science and Economics at St. Francis Xavier University in Antigonish, Nova Scotia. He began graduate studies at Queen's University in Kingston, Ontario, before enrolling in law school at the University of New Brunswick (Fredericton).

After earning a law degree, he moved to Chatham and began practicing law. He garnered a place in contemporary Acadian folklore as the defence lawyer in the high-profile widely publicized murder case of famous New Brunswick boxing champion, Yvon Durelle.

== Political career ==
A few years later, he entered provincial politics and won a seat in the Legislative Assembly of New Brunswick in the 1982 election to represent Chatham, New Brunswick. He became leader of the provincial Liberals in 1985, and won one of the largest electoral victories in Canadian history in the 1987 election when his party won every seat in the legislature.

McKenna's term in office was viewed mostly as a success. His key priority throughout his term was job creation and he was known to say that the "best social program we have is a job." He encouraged small business growth and tried to entice large companies to invest in the province with tax incentives, often directly calling individual professionals to urge them to bring their talents to New Brunswick. Another of his strategies was to raise the collective self-confidence of New Brunswickers, which he believed would increase productivity. He introduced a sophisticated public relations operation which included the use of controversial video news releases.

McKenna's time as premier, however, also saw some controversy. In his first move as premier, McKenna dismissed several senior public servants in an effort to gain greater control over the province's public service, which some observers perceived as a drastic step away from the integrity of the province's impartial and professional public service.

McKenna was also criticized for increasing the number of communications personnel on the government payroll but countered this complaint by pointing out that the primary government communications agency, Communications New Brunswick, had been depoliticized.

He was also criticized for creating a toll free telephone number to the premier's office which had the number 1-800-MCKENNA, the number was functional throughout North America and was used for both New Brunswick constituents and business interests that were considering moving to the province.

Believing ten years was long enough for a premier to hold office, and having pledged to serve such a term when first elected, McKenna resigned in 1997 – 10 years to the day of the 1987 election.

== Ambassador to the USA ==
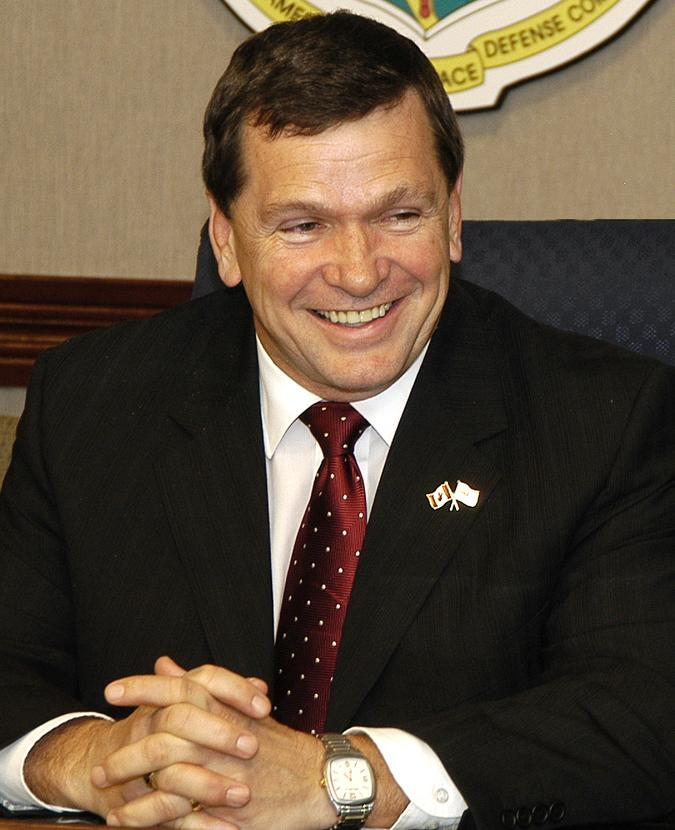
McKenna in 2005

McKenna was mentioned as a possible Ambassador to the US to succeed Michael Kergin after Paul Martin took power. Speculation increased after John Manley turned down Prime Minister Martin's offer. Many in the press commented on McKenna's business connections being an asset, notably as a member of the Carlyle Group and his friendship with former president George H. W. Bush.

On January 5, 2005, Prime Minister Paul Martin's office confirmed that McKenna would be the 21st Ambassador to the United States. On January 14, the posting was formally announced and would be effective on March 1. McKenna became the Ambassador on March 8 when U.S. President George W. Bush accepted his credentials.

On February 22, 2005, McKenna told reporters Canada was already a part of the U.S. National Missile Defense (NMD) (or Ballistic Missile Defense (BMD)) program through an amendment to the NORAD agreement made on August 5, 2004, which granted U.S. access to NORAD's missile warning systems explicitly for use in NMD. However, Martin contradicted this two days later when he announced that Canada would not formally participate in the NMD program but focus on other items of shared defence/security interest. While Canadian defence minister Bill Graham said McKenna was simply misunderstood (as the NORAD agreement and missile defence are separate), this initial contradiction was interpreted by others as evidence of characteristic indecision by the Martin government and was seen to somewhat hamper McKenna's credibility.

As Ambassador, McKenna attracted more media attention than most of his recent predecessors on both sides of the border. In the U.S., his message was one of dispelling common urban legends and misconceptions about Canada, while in Canada he urged Canadians to be more understanding of the American people and culture, particularly following what he argued is their understandable sensitivity after the September 11, 2001 attacks.

McKenna generated controversy after giving a luncheon speech on September 29, 2005, to a Toronto business club. McKenna blasted the U.S. bureaucracy and Congressional system of government saying, "the government of the United States is in large measure dysfunctional." He contrasted it with Canada's government, and praised Canada's strong parliamentary party discipline as being much more "efficient" though sometimes less preferable.

On January 25, 2006, McKenna offered his resignation as Ambassador, writing to Prime Minister-designate Stephen Harper that he wished to be relieved of his duties, but offering to stay on until his successor was chosen. He was succeeded as ambassador by Michael Wilson on March 13, 2006.

== Later career ==
=== Business career ===
After leaving office, McKenna moved to Cap-Pélé, New Brunswick, near Moncton, and returned to the practice of law and sat on numerous corporate boards. He also purchased (with his son, James McKenna), Glenwood Kitchen Ltd., a manufacturer of high-end custom cabinetry in Shediac, New Brunswick. His membership on the Canadian advisory board of the Carlyle Group drew adverse media attention; the media ceased pursuing the issue when McKenna explained that the board was established to advise on a Canadian investment fund that the group never created and that the board had never become active.

Following the announcement of his appointment as Canadian ambassador to Washington, he resigned his position as counsel at law firms including McInnes Cooper and Osler, Hoskin & Harcourt, as well as all positions on corporate boards including his role as interim chairman of the board of CanWest Global Communications, a post he assumed upon the death of its founder and chairman Israel Asper.

McKenna was appointed as Deputy Chair, TD Bank Financial Group effective May 1, 2006. Effective August 2006, McKenna was appointed to the board of Brookfield Corporation (known as Brookfield Asset Management until the spinoff of the operations of the current Brookfield Asset Management in 2022), and he has been the Chair of Brookfield Corporation since August 2010.

McKenna is referenced in the book Clinton Cash by Peter Schweizer. The majority of the reference is regarding the Keystone Pipeline decision-making process. Hillary Clinton serving as secretary of State in the United States, and the monetary involvement with TD Bank in Canada is described in depth. The book describes TD Bank, with McKenna as vice chairman, as having "paid Bill more than any other financial institution for Lectures. More than Goldman Sachs, UBS, JPMorgan, or anyone on Wall Street." Quoting from the book,

TD Bank paid Bill $1.8 million for ten speeches over a roughly two-and-half-year period from late 2008 to mid-2011. ... At several of the speeches, (Bill) Clinton was introduced or interviewed by TD Bank vice chairman Frank McKenna. Frank McKenna is described as a 'good friend of both Bill and Hillary Clinton.'

=== Federal politics involvement ===
Since leaving politics in 1997, McKenna served for a brief time on the Security Intelligence Review Committee. He has been touted several times as a potential Atlantic Canadian minister in the cabinets of Jean Chrétien and Paul Martin. He expressed some interest in running in the 2004 federal election but announced he would not do so because of the lack of an available riding in the Moncton, New Brunswick, area. He did not want to push aside any incumbent Liberal member of Parliament.

After resigning the premiership of New Brunswick, McKenna was identified as a potential future leader of the Liberal Party of Canada, and Prime Minister of Canada. A poll released on August 23, 2005, commissioned by the Toronto Star, showed that McKenna was the top choice of the public to succeed Prime Minister Paul Martin. Among the general public, McKenna beat former New Democratic Party Ontario Premier Bob Rae by a margin of 23 to 11 while among self-identified Liberals, McKenna beat former Deputy Prime Minister of Canada John Manley by a margin of 28 to 13. The October 2005 issue of Saturday Night magazine had pollster Darrell Bricker and Liberal strategist Warren Kinsella create odds for potential Liberal leadership candidates. They made McKenna the favourite with 7 to 2 odds beating Scott Brison (8 to 1), Martin Cauchon (10 to 1), Michael Ignatieff and John Manley (each 15 to 1) among others.

On January 30, 2006, McKenna confirmed earlier reports that he was not running for the Liberal leadership to replace Paul Martin, who announced his resignation as party leader on the January 23, 2006 election night. McKenna acknowledged the strength of the Liberal brand stating: "You've got pretty good odds of being the prime minister if you're the leader of the Liberal party" – every leader of the Liberal party since Sir Wilfrid Laurier in 1896 had become prime minister. However, he put an end to his involvement in the 2006 Liberal Party leadership race, explaining his decision by saying that he did not want "his life to become consumed by politics." and that: "I reminded myself of my vow upon leaving office that, having escaped the trap, I wouldn’t go back for the cheese."

Following Stéphane Dion's resignation as federal Liberal leader after the 2008 election, McKenna was once again touted as a possibility to take the helm of the federal Liberal Party. However, on October 28, 2008, McKenna said that he would not be seeking the leadership, saying "Although I have been deeply moved by expressions of support for me from across the country, I have not been persuaded to change my long-standing resolve to exit public life for good," and "My only regret is that I cannot honour the expectations of friends and supporters who have shown enormous loyalty to me."

== Distinctions ==
- Queen's Privy Council for Canada (1999)
