= New Brunswick Liberal Association =

Provincial political party in Canada

New Brunswick Liberal Association Association libérale du Nouveau-Brunswick
- Leader: Susan Holt
- President: Carley Parish
- Founded: 1883; 143 years ago
- Headquarters: 715 Brunswick Street; Fredericton, New Brunswick; E3B 1H8
- Membership (2022): 9,408
- Ideology: Liberalism
- Political position: Centre
- National affiliation: Liberal Party of Canada
- Colours: Red
- Seats in Legislature: 31 / 49

Website
- nbliberal.ca

The New Brunswick Liberal Association (French: Association libérale du Nouveau-Brunswick), commonly known as the New Brunswick Liberal Party, or Liberal Party of New Brunswick, is one of the two major provincial political parties in New Brunswick, Canada. The party descended from both the Confederation Party and the Anti-Confederation Party whose members split into left-wing and right-wing groups following the creation of Canada as a nation in 1867. It is the current governing party in the province, led by premier Susan Holt.

The current political organization emerged in the 1880s to serve as an organization housing the supporters of Premier Andrew G. Blair and, later, federal Liberal Party of Canada leader Wilfrid Laurier.

They compete with the Progressive Conservative Party of New Brunswick to form government in the provincial legislature. The Green Party of New Brunswick is the only other party that has seats in the legislature, with the New Brunswick New Democratic Party not being currently represented.

== History ==
=== Early years and Andrew Blair ===
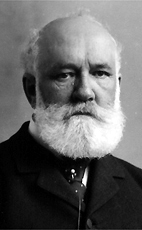
A. G. Blair

Prior to Canadian Confederation, advocates of responsible government ran under the labels "Reform" or "Liberal", while opponents of responsible government were known as "Conservatives". With the debates over confederation in the 1860s, the party lines which had emerged blurred as Reformers split along pro and anti-Confederation lines, resulting in Confederation and Anti-Confederation Parties.

Following 1867, supporters of Confederation generally became known as Liberal-Conservatives, or just Conservatives. Those who had been against confederation regrouped loosely as "Liberals", but did not become a coherent party until Andrew Blair, a supporter of Confederation, became Premier of New Brunswick and forged members of his parliamentary government and their supporters into the New Brunswick Liberal Association in 1883.

Blair led a very successful government and served as the Premier of New Brunswick for 13 years. He was New Brunswick's longest serving premier until his tenure was surpassed by Richard Hatfield nearly a century later.

Though Blair had not been a candidate in the 1896 federal election, he joined the federal cabinet of Sir Wilfrid Laurier shortly thereafter when Laurier approached a number of Liberal premiers to join his government and address its lack of experience. This move was not expected by the party and, although it remained in government for 12 more years, it went through a rapid succession of leaders.

=== Early 1900s ===
After Blair abruptly left the province to join Wilfrid Laurier's cabinet in 1896, the Liberals had a leadership vacuum. James Mitchell, who had been provincial secretary, served briefly as Premier, but Mitchell soon resigned the post due to ill health. Mitchell was replaced by Henry Emmerson, who showed some promise but lost the confidence of the house when he tried to introduce women's suffrage in 1900.

The party was saved electoral disaster when Lemuel J. Tweedie, a federal Conservative, replaced Emmerson, and won two large majorities at general elections. Though women's suffrage could not be introduced in the province, he admitted women into the practice of law in 1906, and began the first major hydroelectric project in New Brunswick at Grand Falls. Tweedie unexpectedly accepted the appointment of Lieutenant-Governor of New Brunswick in 1907, and the Liberals soon found themselves again in a leadership vacuum. William Pugsley became leader and premier, but left the post after a few months to join the Laurier's government in Ottawa. His replacement, Clifford W. Robinson was able but the electorate grew weary of the ever-changing face at head of their government, and the Conservatives swept to power in 1908. The Conservatives were an easy choice for many New Brunswickers in the 1908 provincial election as they had been led since 1899 by John Douglas Hazen, a man with whom they had become familiar. Hazen served only briefly, leaving in 1911 to join the federal cabinet of Robert Borden, and was replaced by the charismatic and popular James Kidd Flemming. The Liberals were easily defeated by Flemming in the 1912 election, however, after Flemming was forced to resign in 1914 over a fundraising scandal, the Liberals seemed on track to return to government. This likelihood was reinforced by the lackluster administration of George Johnson Clarke who was in ill health throughout his term. The Liberals were victorious in the 1917 provincial election.

=== Dysart and McNair ===
In the midst of the depression, the Liberals made a resurgence in 1935 with Allison Dysart becoming premier. McNair was Dysart's right hand, serving as Attorney General until replacing him as premier in 1940. McNair served until 1952 when he was defeated by Hugh John Flemming.

=== Louis J. Robichaud ===
During the 1960s, the Liberals under Louis Joseph Robichaud were instrumental in bringing Acadians into the mainstream of life in New Brunswick, declaring the province to be officially bilingual. The English and French languages were given equal status. Robichaud's government modernized the province's hospitals and public schools and introduced a wide range of social reforms. The Liberals also passed an act in 1969 making New Brunswick officially bilingual. "Language rights", he said when he introduced the legislation, "are more than legal rights. They are precious cultural rights, going deep into the revered past and touching the historic traditions of all our people."

Robichaud also restructured the municipal tax regime, ending the ability of business to play one municipality against another in order to extract the lowest tax rates. He introduced in 1963 the Municipal Capital Borrowing Act and Board, which is designed to act as a brake for spendthrift municipalities. He also expanded the government and sought to ensure that the quality of health care, education and social services was the same across the province—a programme he called Equal Opportunity, which is still a political buzz phrase in New Brunswick. "When I first realized that there was absolutely no equal opportunity, no equality, in New Brunswick," he recalled in the 1980s, "well, I had to come to the conclusion that something had to be done immediately."

=== Opposition in the Hatfield years ===
Following defeat in the 1970 election, the Liberals were largely in disarray. The party's prospects in the 1978 election were good, but it changed leaders on the eve of the election, and, under Joseph Daigle was defeated narrowly by the Progressive Conservatives. The PCs won 30 seats in the Legislative Assembly to the Liberals' 28. The party was reduced to 18 seats in 1982 under new leader Doug Young.

=== Frank McKenna ===
In 1985, the party chose Frank McKenna as leader. McKenna, a young lawyer representing Chatham in the legislature in his first term, ran as the underdog candidate in a leadership campaign against party stalwart Ray Frenette. Frenette had served as interim leader from the disastrous 1982 election until the eve of the 1985 leadership race. McKenna won by significant margin.

McKenna immediately set out to prepare the party for returning to government after 15 years in opposition. The momentum was on the side of the Liberals and it seemed inevitable that McKenna would be premier as soon as an election was held. Few expected, though, that the Liberals would sweep the province, winning every seat—the second time this had happened in Canadian history (the first time was in the Prince Edward Island provincial election of 1935).

McKenna was regarded as a fiscal conservative and was called by some the "Best Tory Premier New Brunswick never had". Despite this, McKenna was a progressive on many issues. He made considerable cuts to social programs because of the province's dire fiscal situation and cuts to federal equalization payments and other transfers. He also instituted new programs. Notably, McKenna instituted a publicly funded kindergarten program—something that had been promised by the Hatfield-led Progressive Conservatives in the previous four elections. McKenna also launched a home care program called "Extramural Nursing" which has been hailed as the best in Canada. In the 2002 Romanow report on the Future of Healthcare in Canada, New Brunswick's system was specifically cited as a model for homecare in Canada.

Despite riding high in the polls, McKenna resigned on October 13, 1997, ten years (to the day) since his first election as premier, fulfilling a promise to serve for only ten years.

McKenna was replaced by Frenette, who had served as his right-hand in the legislature throughout his term. Frenette served as premier for the following seven months while the party chose a new leader. Frenette was replaced by Camille Thériault who served as premier until the 1999 election.

In the 1999 election, the Liberals suffered their worst ever defeat, winning only 10 seats despite having begun the campaign with a double-digit lead in opinion polls. The by-election losses were a further blow to Camille Thériault's leadership, and he resigned from the party leadership and the legislature on March 21, 2001. Bernard Richard, who had finished third in the leadership contest against Thériault in 1998, became interim leader.

In 2000, Liberal Member of the Legislative Assembly (MLA) Bernard Thériault resigned to make an unsuccessful bid for the House of Commons of Canada in Acadie-Bathurst, and Edmond Blanchard resigned to accept an appointment to the Federal Court of Canada. The Progressive Conservatives won both of these seats in by-elections in early 2001, reducing the Liberals to eight seats in the legislature.

=== Shawn Graham ===
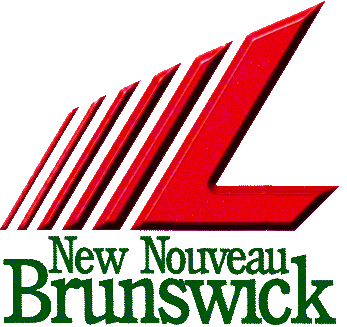
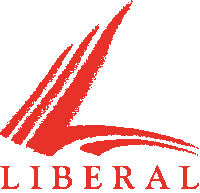
Logos used during the late 1990s (left) and early 2000s (right)

In the following leadership contest, many candidates appeared briefly but withdrew. Early candidates included former cabinet minister Paul Duffie, former McKenna adviser Francis McGuire, and Moncton lawyer Mike Murphy. McGuire, after briefly considering a bid, declined. Murphy began the formative stages of a campaign, but abruptly withdrew, surprising many of his supporters. This left Duffie largely unchallenged. The only other candidate was former party organizer Jack MacDougall who had abruptly left the party in the midst of the 1999 campaign.

Many in the party felt that Duffie, who was close to Thériault, was the wrong choice. Bernard Richard was urged to abandon the interim leadership and contest the race, and began a formative campaign before announcing he would continue as interim leader instead. After the campaign had already begun in earnest, Shawn Graham, a rookie MLA in his early 30s, announced his candidacy in January 2002. Graham took a convincing lead in delegate selection meetings. Duffie withdrew, leaving Graham to face only MacDougall whom he defeated by a 3-to-1 margin.

The party chose Shawn Graham as leader on May 12, 2002. Graham nearly won the 2003 election taking 26 of 55 seats in the New Brunswick legislature. Richard, who was re-elected in 2003, accepted a provincial appointment on November 26, 2003. This was viewed as a serious blow to Graham's leadership.

Graham led the Liberals to a narrow victory in the 2006 provincial election winning 29 of 55 seats and losing the popular vote 47.2% to 47.5% for the Progressive Conservatives. The Liberals took power on October 3, 2006. They subsequently added three extra seats. Chris Collins captured the seat in the riding of Moncton East on March 5, 2007, which was vacated when former Premier Bernard Lord stepped down as leader of the Progressive Conservatives. Wally Stiles and his wife Joan MacAlpine Stiles, elected as Progressive Conservatives, crossed the floor to join the Liberals the following month, April 17.

Previous New Brunswick Liberal logo

On September 27, 2010, Shawn Graham lost his bid to be re-elected as Premier (13 to 42) to provincial PC leader David Alward, but remained MLA for Kent riding. He stepped down as leader of the party on November 9, 2010, and Victor Boudreau was selected as the party's interim leader the following day. The Shawn Graham Government was the first one of the province to not get re-elected for a second term.

=== Brian Gallant ===
After a term in Opposition, the Liberals returned to power under Brian Gallant, winning a majority in the 2014 provincial election with Gallant being sworn in as Premier on October 7, 2014. Gallant's first cabinet, of 13 members, was smaller than the outgoing cabinet.

During his government's mandate the province's economy and exports grew each year; the unemployment rate which was hovering around 10% was reduced to just over 7%; in 2016 KPMG found that three of the four most cost competitive cities in which to do business in Canada and the United States were in New Brunswick; the province's population grew to a record high surpassing 770,000 people for the first time; one of the most vibrant cybersecurity clusters in North America was developed in New Brunswick's capital city; and the province saw its first budget surplus in a decade.

The Gallant government increased the budget for education and early childhood development by 15% over its mandate in order to invest in literacy initiatives, introduce coding in more schools, and reintroduce trades in high schools.

The Gallant government created programs to help the middle class with the cost of childcare and to provide free childcare to families which need the most support. The Gallant government also created programs to help the middle class with the cost of tuition and to provide free tuition for those who need the most support.

The Gallant government eliminated the unconstitutional two doctor rule that was hindering a women's right to choose for decades in New Brunswick. In 2016, New Brunswick welcomed the most Syrian refugees displaced by the humanitarian crisis per capita of all the provinces in the country.

The Gallant government also advanced women's equality by moving pay equity forward to the point of New Brunswick having the second lowest gender wage gap of all the Canadian provinces in 2017; by having over 50% of government appointments to agencies, boards, and commissions go to women; and by providing the first gender parity on New Brunswick's provincial court.

Gallant has repeatedly stated that climate change is the greatest challenge facing humanity. With this in mind, the Gallant government took concrete action to protect the environment including by creating the "Transitioning to a Low Carbon Economy" plan which commits to historic measures to fight climate change. The Gallant government also placed a moratorium on hydraulic fracturing and a ban on the disposal of fracked wastewater in municipal systems.

In addition to premier, Gallant has served New Brunswick as the Attorney General, the Minister responsible for innovation, the Minister responsible for women's equality, and the Leader of Her Majesty's Loyal Opposition.

The 2018 provincial election resulted in Gallant's Liberals winning only 21 seats compared to Blaine Higgs and the Progressive Conservative Party of New Brunswick who won 22. Gallant vowed to attempt to remain in power with a minority government and hoped to retain the confidence of the Legislative Assembly of New Brunswick either on a vote-by-vote basis or with the agreement of the smaller parties, the Green Party of New Brunswick and the People's Alliance of New Brunswick, each of which won three seats in the election.

=== In opposition (2018–2024) ===
On November 2, 2018, Gallant's Liberal minority government was defeated by a confidence vote on its throne speech by a margin of 25 to 23 with the opposition Progressive Conservatives and People's Alliance voting against the government and the Greens voting with the government. Gallant resigned as premier on November 2, 2018 and was replaced by Higgs, leading a Progressive Conservative minority government with support from the People's Alliance.

Kevin Vickers was acclaimed as the new Liberal leader in April 2019. He ran in Miramichi in 2020 and lost to incumbent MLA Michelle Conroy; Conroy later crossed the floor to join the PCNB). He resigned as party leader the same day. In September 2020, Roger Melanson was named interim leader until Susan Holt was elected as party leader on August 6, 2022.

=== Susan Holt ===
After 2 terms in Opposition, the Liberals returned to power under Susan Holt, winning a majority in the 2024 provincial election with Holt being sworn in as Premier on November 2, 2024.

== Electoral performance ==
Election	Leader	Votes	%	Seats	+/–	Position	Status
1935	Allison Dysart		59.6	43 / 48	▲43	▲1st	Majority
1939	Allison Dysart		54.8	29 / 48	▼14	1st	Majority
1944	John McNair		48.3	36 / 48	▲7	1st	Majority
1948	John McNair		57.8	47 / 52	▲11	1st	Majority
1952	John McNair		49.2	16 / 52	▼31	▼2nd	Opposition
1956	Austin Taylor		46.1	15 / 52	▼1	2nd	Opposition
1960	Louis Robichaud		53.4	31 / 52	▲16	▲1st	Majority
1963	Louis Robichaud		51.8	32 / 52	▲1	1st	Majority
1967	Louis Robichaud		52.8	32 / 58	0	1st	Majority
1970	Louis Robichaud		48.6	26 / 58	▼6	▼2nd	Opposition
1974	Robert Higgins	147,372	47.5	25 / 58	▼1	2nd	Opposition
1978	Joseph Daigle		44.4	28 / 58	▲3	2nd	Opposition
1982	Doug Young		41.3	18 / 58	▼10	2nd	Opposition
1987	Frank McKenna	246,702	60.4	58 / 58	▲40	▲1st	Majority
1991	Frank McKenna	193,890	47.1	46 / 58	▼12	1st	Majority
1995	Frank McKenna	201,150	51.6	48 / 55	▲2	1st	Majority
1999	Camille Thériault	146,934	37.3	10 / 55	▼38	▼2nd	Opposition
2003	Shawn Graham	170,028	44.4	26 / 55	▲16	2nd	Opposition
2006	Shawn Graham	176,410	47.1	29 / 55	▲3	▲1st	Majority
2010	Shawn Graham	128,078	34.5	13 / 55	▼16	▼2nd	Opposition
2014	Brian Gallant	158,848	42.7	27 / 49	▲14	▲1st	Majority
2018	Brian Gallant	143,791	37.8	21 / 49	▼6	▼2nd	Opposition
2020	Kevin Vickers	129,022	34.3	17 / 49	▼3	2nd	Opposition
2024	Susan Holt	176,751	48.6	31 / 49	▲14	▲1st	Majority

== Current members of the legislature ==
Name	Riding	First elected
Guy Arseneault	Restigouche East	2018
Lyne Chantal Boudreau	Champdoré-Irishtown	2024
Benoît Bourque	Beausoleil-Grand-Bouctouche-Kent	2014
Chuck Chiasson	Grand Falls-Vallée-des-Rivières-Saint-Quentin	2014
Keith Chiasson	Tracadie-Sheila	2018
Jean-Claude D'Amours	Edmundston-Vallée-des-Rivières	2018
John Dornan	Saint John Portland-Simonds	2024
Alexandre Cédric Doucet	Moncton East	2024
Pat Finnigan	Kent North	2024
Robert Gauvin	Shediac Bay-Dieppe	2020
John Herron	Hampton-Fundy-St. Martins	2024
David Hickey	Saint John Harbour	2024
Susan Holt	Fredericton South-Silverwood	2023
Claire Johnson	Moncton South	2024
Sam Johnston	Miramichi Bay-Neguac	2024
Aaron Kennedy	Quispamsis	2024
Francine Landry	Madawaska Les Lacs-Edmundston	2014
Jacques LeBlanc	Shediac-Cap-Acadie	2018
Marco LeBlanc	Belle-Baie-Belledune	2023
René Legacy	Bathurst	2020
Gilles LePage	Restigouche West	2014
Eric Mallet	Shippagan-Les-Îles	2020
Rob McKee	Moncton Centre	2018
Cindy Miles	Hanwell-New Maryland	2024
Luke Randall	Fredericton North	2024
Luc Robichaud	Hautes-Terres-Nepisiguit	2024
Tania Sodhi	Moncton Northwest	2024
Isabelle Thériault	Caraquet	2018
Alyson Townsend	Rothesay	2024
Natacha Vautour	Dieppe-Memramcook	2024
Kate Elman Wilcott	Saint John West-Lancaster	2024

== Party leaders since 1867 ==
- Andrew George Blair, 1879–1896
- James Mitchell, 1896–1897
- Henry Emmerson, 1897–1900
- Lemuel John Tweedie, 1900–1907
- William Pugsley, 1907
- Clifford W. Robinson, 1907–1912
- Arthur Bliss Copp, 1912 (interim)
- Louis-Auguste Dugal, 1912–1916
- Walter E. Foster, 1916–1923
- Peter Veniot, 1923–1926
- Allison Dysart, 1926–1930
- Wendell P. Jones, 1930–1932
- Allison Dysart, 1932–1940
- John B. McNair, 1940–1954
- Austin Claude Taylor, 1954–1957
- Joseph E. Connolly, 1957–1958 (interim)
- Louis Robichaud, 1958–1971
- Robert J. Higgins, 1971–1978
- Joseph Daigle, 1978–1981
- Doug Young, 1981–1983
- Ray Frenette, 1983–1985 (interim)
- Shirley Dysart, 1985 (interim)
- Frank McKenna, 1985–1997
- Ray Frenette, 1997–1998 (interim)
- Camille Thériault, 1998–2001
- Bernard Richard, 2001–2002 (interim)
- Shawn Graham, 2002–2010
- Victor Boudreau, 2010–2012 (interim)
- Brian Gallant, 2012–2019
- Denis Landry, 2019 (interim)
- Kevin Vickers, 2019–2020
- Roger Melanson, 2020–2022 (interim)
- Susan Holt, 2022–present

== Presidents since 1932 ==
- John B. McNair (1932–1940)
- G. Percival Burchill (1941–1953)
- Harry A. Corey (1953–1959)
- Wesley Stuart (1960–1963)
- Daniel A. Riley (1963–1964) (Acting)
- Hugh Tait (1964–1966)
- Donald A. McLean (1966–1971)
- Norbert Thériault (1971–1977)
- Peter Seheult (1977–1979)
- Jack Stevens (1979–1983)
- Sumner Fraser (1983–1986)
- Aldéa Landry (1986–1988)
- Mike Murphy (1988–1992)
- Réginald Léger (1992–2000)
- Maurice Richard (2000–2002)
- Jim Mockler (2002–2003) (Acting)
- Greg Byrne (2003–2006)
- Marcelle Mersereau (2006–2007) (Acting)
- J. E. Britt Dysart (2007–2015)
- Joel Reed (2015–present)

== See also ==
- List of New Brunswick premiers
- List of political parties in Canada
- 2002 New Brunswick Liberal Association leadership election
- 2012 New Brunswick Liberal Association leadership election
- 2019 New Brunswick Liberal Association leadership election
- 2022 New Brunswick Liberal Association leadership election
- New Brunswick Liberal Association leadership elections
