= Oromocto (electoral district) =

Defunct provincial electoral district in New Brunswick, Canada

New Brunswick electoral district
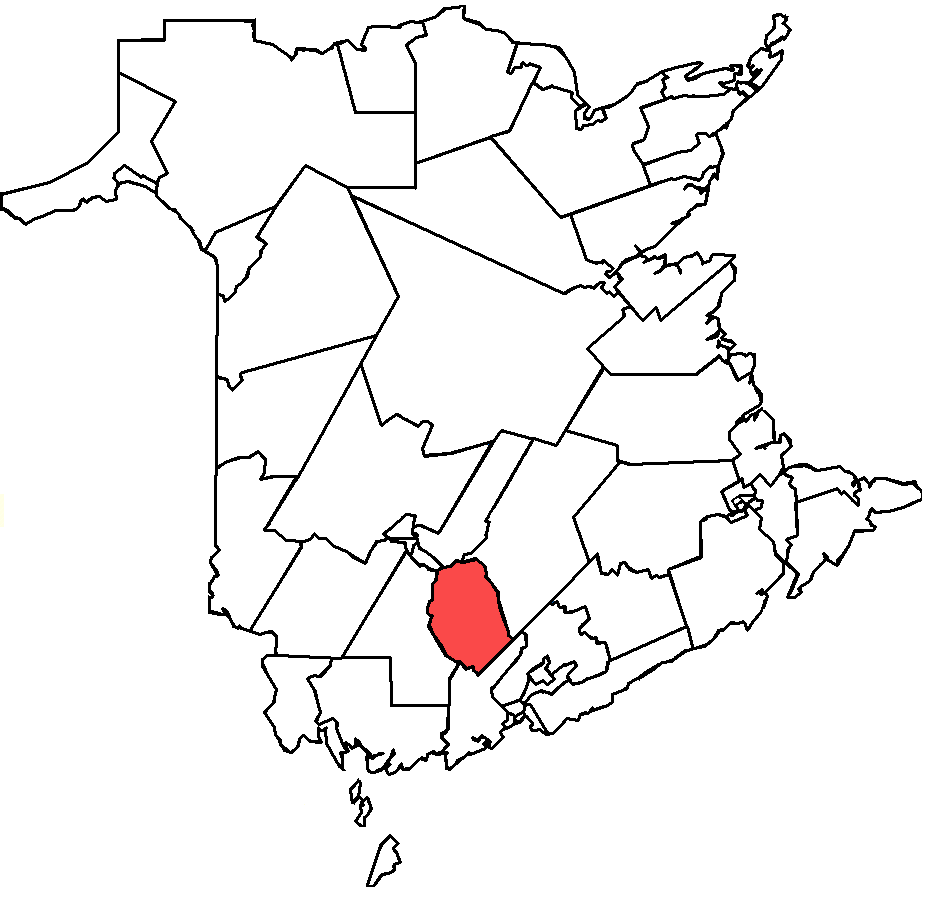
- Coordinates: 45.714°N 66.331°W

Defunct provincial electoral district
- Legislature: Legislative Assembly of New Brunswick
- District created: 1973
- District abolished: 2013
- First contested: 1974
- Last contested: 2010

Demographics
- Population (2006): 14,136

Oromocto was a provincial electoral district for the Legislative Assembly of New Brunswick, Canada.

The district was created in 1973 from the old multi-member district of Sunbury, taking in the Town of Oromocto, CFB Gagetown and immediate surrounding areas. In 1994 its boundaries were considerably expanded, taking in larger parts of Sunbury County and parts of Queens County and it was renamed Oromocto-Gagetown (in recognition of the village of Gagetown, not the Canadian Forces Base known as CFB Gagetown). In 2006, its boundaries were changed again when it lost all of its territory north of the Saint John River and was returned to the original name of Oromocto.

== Members of the Legislative Assembly ==
Assembly	Years	Member	Party
Oromocto; Riding created from Sunbury
48th	1974–1978	LeRoy Washburn	Liberal
49th	1978–1982	LeRoy Washburn	Liberal
50th	1982–1987	Joseph Mombourquette	Progressive Conservative
51st	1987–1991	Tom Gilbert	Liberal
52nd	1991–1995	Ab Rector	Confederation of Regions
Oromocto-Gagetown
53rd	1995–1999	Vaughn Blaney	Liberal
54th	1999–2003	Jody Carr	Progressive Conservative
55th	2003–2006	Jody Carr	Progressive Conservative
Oromocto
56th	2006–2010	Jody Carr	Progressive Conservative
57th	2010–2014	Jody Carr	Progressive Conservative
Riding dissolved into Oromocto-Lincoln, New Maryland-Sunbury and Gagetown-Petitcodiac

== Election results ==
=== Oromocto (2006–2010) ===
2010 New Brunswick general election
Party	Candidate	Votes	%	±%
Progressive Conservative	Jody Carr	3,660	81.21	+14.80
Liberal	Georgina Jones	567	12.58	-17.73
New Democratic	Beau Davidson	280	6.21	+2.93
Total valid votes		4,507	100.0	
Total rejected ballots		37	0.81	
Turnout		4,544	58.78	
Eligible voters		7,731		
Progressive Conservative hold		Swing		+16.26
Source: Elections New Brunswick

2006 New Brunswick general election
Party	Candidate	Votes	%	±%
Progressive Conservative	Jody Carr	3,179	66.41	+4.56
Liberal	Shelby Mercer	1,451	30.31	-0.37
New Democratic	Stephen Beam	157	3.28	-2.34
Total valid votes		4,787	100.0	
Progressive Conservative hold		Swing		+2.46

=== Oromocto-Gagetown ===
2003 New Brunswick general election
Party	Candidate	Votes	%	±%
Progressive Conservative	Jody Carr	4,314	61.85	-1.84
Liberal	Maurice Harquail	2,140	30.68	+0.69
New Democratic	Terry Hovey	392	5.62	+1.50
Grey	James Lee	129	1.85	–
Total valid votes		6,975	100.0	
Progressive Conservative hold		Swing		-1.26

1999 New Brunswick general election
Party	Candidate	Votes	%	±%
Progressive Conservative	Jody Carr	4,372	63.69	+35.92
Liberal	Ron Lindala	2,059	29.99	-22.79
New Democratic	Terry John Hovey	283	4.12	-1.70
Confederation of Regions	Paul Pye	151	2.20	-11.44
Total valid votes		6,865	100.0	
Progressive Conservative gain from Liberal		Swing		+29.36

1995 New Brunswick general election
Party	Candidate	Votes	%	±%
Liberal	Vaughn Blaney	3,537	52.78	+15.55
Progressive Conservative	Jody Carr	1,861	27.77	+10.60
Confederation of Regions	Ab Rector	914	13.64	-26.53
New Democratic	Sandra Burtt	390	5.82	+0.39
Total valid votes		6,702	100.0	
Liberal gain from Confederation of Regions		Swing		+2.48

=== Oromocto (1974–1995) ===
1991 New Brunswick general election
Party	Candidate	Votes	%	±%
Confederation of Regions	Ab Rector	2,197	40.17	–
Liberal	Tom Gilbert	2,036	37.23	-30.51
Progressive Conservative	Joe Mombourquette	939	17.17	-7.33
New Democratic	Alton Shears	297	5.43	-2.33
Total valid votes		5,469	100.0	
Confederation of Regions gain from Liberal		Swing		+35.34

1987 New Brunswick general election
Party	Candidate	Votes	%	±%
Liberal	Tom Gilbert	3,807	67.74	+18.16
Progressive Conservative	Joe Mombourquette	1,377	24.50	-25.98
New Democratic	Barbara Carr	436	7.76	–
Total valid votes		5,620	100.0	
Liberal gain from Progressive Conservative		Swing		+22.07

1982 New Brunswick general election
Party	Candidate	Votes	%	±%
Progressive Conservative	Joe Mombourquette	2,583	50.48	+3.69
Liberal	LeRoy Washburn	2,534	49.58	+1.74
Total valid votes		5,117	100.0	
Progressive Conservative gain		Swing		+0.98

1978 New Brunswick general election
Party	Candidate	Votes	%	±%
Liberal	Leroy Washburn	2,522	47.84	-1.84
Progressive Conservative	John Edward McKee	2,467	46.79	-0.68
New Democratic	Jim Aucoin	283	5.37	+2.51
Total valid votes		5,272	100.0	
Liberal hold		Swing		-0.58

1974 New Brunswick general election
Party	Candidate	Votes	%
Liberal	LeRoy Washburn	2,244	49.68
Progressive Conservative	R.W. "Reg" Mabey	2,144	47.47
New Democratic	James H. Aucoin	129	2.86
Total valid votes		4,517	100.0
The previous multi-member riding of Sunbury went totally Progressive Conservative in the last election. Reginald W. Mabey was one of the two incumbents.

== See also ==
- List of New Brunswick provincial electoral districts
- Canadian provincial electoral districts
