= Beverly Brine =

Canadian politician

Beverly Mae Brine (June 19, 1961 - December 14 2025) was an investment counsellor and former political figure in New Brunswick, Canada. She represented Albert in the Legislative Assembly of New Brunswick as a Confederation of Regions member from 1991 to 1994 and as an independent from 1994 to 1995.

She was born in Moncton, New Brunswick and educated there, as well as in Labrador City. After disputing Danny Cameron's leadership of the party, both Brine and colleague Brent Taylor left the Confederation of Regions caucus in 1994 and did not run for reelection in 1995.

She died in 2025.

Legislative Assembly of New Brunswick
Preceded by Harold A. Terris	MLA for Albert; 1991-1995	Succeeded by Harry Doyle

== See also ==
- NB Legislative Library profile for Beverly Brine
