= James Gordon (New Brunswick politician) =

Canadian politician

Member of the Legislative Assembly of New Brunswick
- In office 1982–1987
- Preceded by: Edgar LeGresley
- Succeeded by: Danny Gay
- Constituency: Miramichi Bay

Personal details
- Born: March 10, 1949 (age 77) Chatham, New Brunswick
- Party: Progressive Conservative Party of New Brunswick
- Spouse: Tilly O'Neill-Gordon (divorced)
- Occupation: security guard

James Kenneth Gordon (born March 10, 1949) is a former Canadian politician. He served in the Legislative Assembly of New Brunswick from 1982 to 1987 as member of the Progressive Conservative Party from the constituency of Miramichi Bay.

On January 6, 2007, Gordon was arrested at Miami International Airport and charged with lewd and lascivious conduct over an incident involving a 15-year-old boy. He pleaded guilty and was sentenced to five years' probation.
