= Brent Taylor (Canadian politician) =

Canadian politician

Member of the Legislative Assembly of New Brunswick
- In office 1991–1995

Brent Taylor
- Born: December 4, 1959 (age 66); Lachine, Quebec
- Education: Bachelor of Arts
- Occupations: politician; YouTuber; newspaper columnist; educator; disc jockey
- Years active: 1980s-present
- Employer: Veterans Affairs Canada
- Political party: Confederation of Regions Party of New Brunswick (1991-1994); Progressive Conservative Party (2006)

Brent Taylor (born December 4, 1959) is a former Canadian politician, educator, newspaper columnist, disc jockey, and YouTuber. He was a member of the Legislative Assembly of New Brunswick from 1991 to 1995. Additionally, he was the Progressive Conservative Party's candidate for the Southwest Miramichi riding, which he previously represented, in the 2006 election when he was unsuccessful in being re-elected. Before entering politics, he was a radio personality for a brief time in the 1980s, and after his departure from the Legislative Assembly in 1995 he worked as a newspaper columnist and educator. He returned to government work in 2007 when he took a job with Veterans Affairs Canada, where he remains employed as of 2020.

== Early life ==
Taylor was born in Lachine, Quebec, the son of Eldon Taylor and Helen Dickson, and briefly attended the University of New Brunswick.

== Political and government work ==
Taylor first became involved in electoral politics in the early 1990s with the formation of the Confederation of Regions Party of New Brunswick. He was elected to the Legislative Assembly of New Brunswick in the 1991 provincial election to represent the riding of Southwest Miramichi.

Taylor was an ally of CoR leader Arch Pafford and was considered on the right of the already generally conservative CoR Party. Pafford did not win a seat in the legislature and, as a result, resigned the leadership in favour of Danny Cameron who became interim leader. Pafford then unsuccessfully tried to rescind his resignation, but a leadership convention was organized at which Taylor ran as the pro-Pafford candidate and won. His term as leader was brief however as Cameron's supporters on the party executive declared Taylor's victory void and Cameron returned to the leadership.

Though CoR formed the official opposition in the legislature at the time, Taylor was never leader of the opposition, because the House did not sit during his brief tenure. He did however serve as chair of the Public Accounts Committee from 1991 to 1994.

Taylor's relationship with Cameron remained cold and he and caucus colleague Beverly Brine were expelled from the caucus in 1994. Taylor served out the remainder of his term as an independent and did not seek re-election in 1995.

In 2003, he was appointed to serve on the Commission on Legislative Democracy appointed by Progressive Conservative Premier Bernard Lord to examine means to modernize and improve democracy in New Brunswick. The commission, among other things, recommended fixed election dates and a form of mixed member proportional representation.

On August 3, 2006, the Fredericton Daily Gleaner reported that Taylor would seek the Progressive Conservative nomination in the riding of Southwest Miramichi for the next provincial election. CoR which was formed in large part by conservatives opposed to the policy of official bilingualism which was supported by the Progressive Conservatives and Taylor had been one of the policy's most vocal critics. However, Taylor said he had moderated his views, stating that he had always supported bilingual services and just did not think that they needed to be enshrined in law but that "I thought that a good government would provide the service anyway. I came to a different conclusion because we can't always guarantee we will have good government."

Despite being billed as a star candidate and receiving much positive media attention, Taylor was unsuccessful in his bid to defeat Liberal incumbent Rick Brewer.

In 2007, he was named to the Veterans Review and Appeal Board. He left that position in 2017 to take another job with Veterans Affairs Canada, the same organisation.

== Other employment ==
In the 1980s, he was a late-night radio personality.

Following his departure from electoral politics, Taylor wrote newspaper columns for the Miramichi Leader and the Daily Gleaner.

From April 1998 to February 2007, he was employed by Atlantic Business College in Fredericton, New Brunswick as a director of information systems.

== Personal life ==
Sometime in the 1970s, he climbed to the summit of Mount Washington.

In 1981, he married Janice Helen Price.

Starting in late 2017, he appeared with regularity on a YouTube channel called "Post2Post", of whose videos he is considered the co-host, and that was created by his son Neil, where they talk about ice hockey. Taylor is a great fan of the Montreal Canadiens. He is affectionately referred to by fans of the channel as the "GOAT" (an acronym for Greatest of All Time). In a video posted on October 6, 2019, his son Neil Taylor said that he would be moving from Prince Edward Island to Fredericton, New Brunswick; as a result, it was said that Brent would be appearing less frequently from then on, but both Neil and Brent said that Brent would still make occasional appearances on the channel.

He is a distant relative of American journalist and media personality Anderson Cooper.

On May 13, 2026, Taylor's son Neil publicly revealed that Taylor had stage 4 terminal cancer.
