= Miramichi Bay-Neguac =

Provincial electoral district in New Brunswick, Canada

New Brunswick electoral district
- The riding of Miramichi Bay-Neguac (as it exists from 2014) in relation to other New Brunswick electoral districts
- Coordinates: 47.171°N 65.847°W

Provincial electoral district
- Legislature: Legislative Assembly of New Brunswick
MLA
Sam Johnston
Liberal
- District created: 1973
- First contested: 1974
- Last contested: 2024

Demographics
- Population (2011): 15,122
- Electors (2022): 12,045
- Census division: Northumberland
- Census subdivision(s): Alnwick, Big Hole Tract 8, Blackville (parish), Blissfield, Eel Ground 2, Esgenoôpetitj 14, Miramichi, Neguac, Newcastle, Northesk, Red Bank 4, Southesk, Tabusintac 9

Miramichi Bay-Neguac (French: Baie-de-Miramichi-Neguac) is a provincial electoral district for the Legislative Assembly of New Brunswick, Canada. It was formerly known more simply as Miramichi Bay. The riding was created from part of the multi-member Northumberland riding, and was first contested in 1974. At the 2013 boundary adjustment, the riding moved western and inland taking in the northeast parts of the city of Miramichi and rural areas to the north and west of the city.

The riding's previous representative in the Legislative Assembly was Carmel Robichaud of the Liberal Party. Roger Duguay, leader of the New Democratic Party from 2007 to 2010, was that party's candidate in Miramichi Bay-Neguac in the 2006 provincial election.

Lisa Harris of the Liberal Party was elected in the September 2014 provincial election.

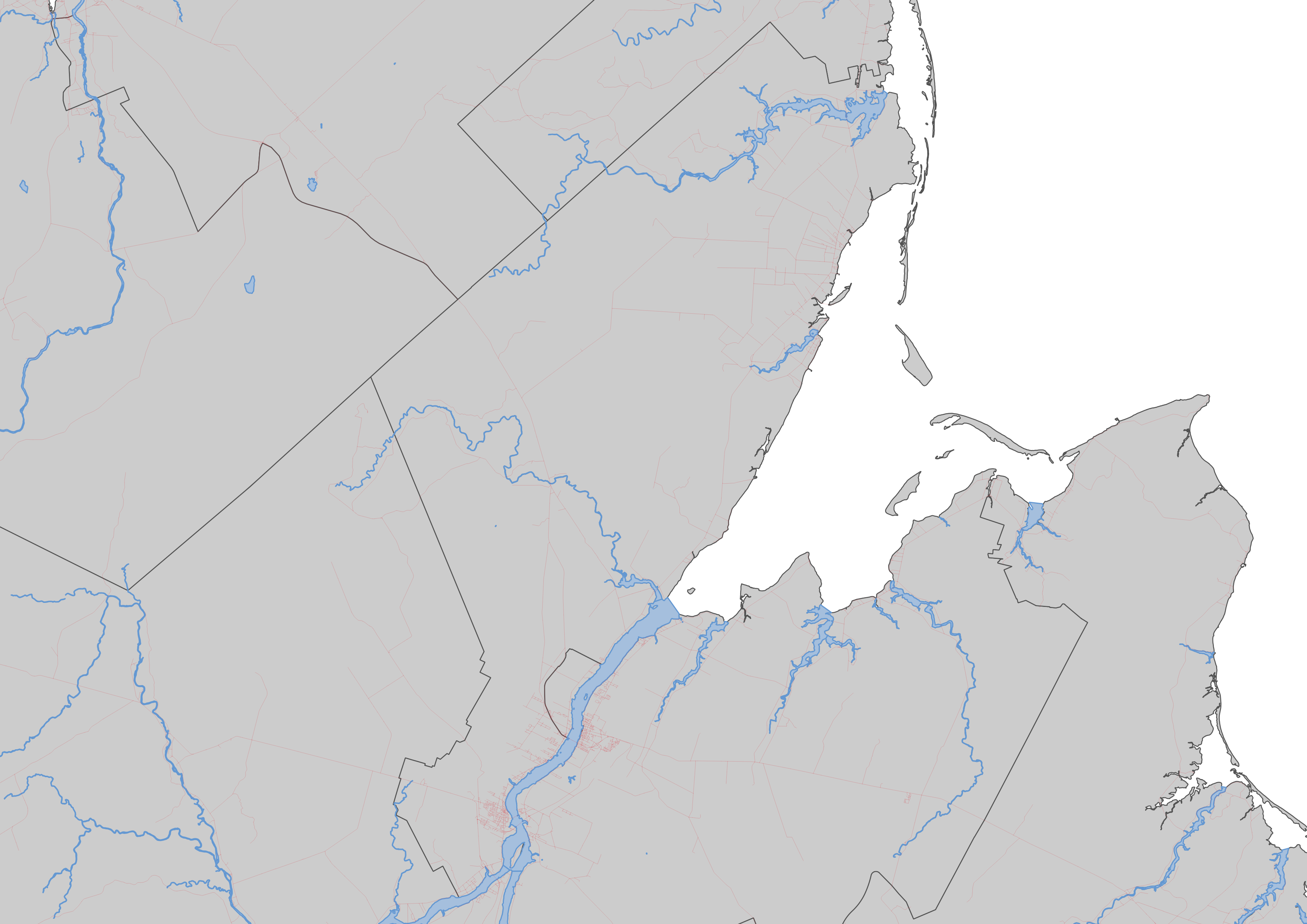
Miramichi Bay-Neguac (as it exists from 2023) and the roads in the riding

== Members of the Legislative Assembly ==
Assembly	Years	Member	Party
Miramichi Bay; Riding created from Northumberland
48th	1974–1978	Edgar LeGresley	Liberal
49th	1978–1982	Edgar LeGresley	Liberal
50th	1982–1987	James Gordon	Progressive Conservative
51st	1987–1991	Danny Gay	Liberal
52nd	1991–1995	Danny Gay	Liberal
53rd	1995–1999	Danny Gay	Liberal
54th	1999–2003	Réjean Savoie	Progressive Conservative
55th	2003–2006	Carmel Robichaud	Liberal
Miramichi Bay-Neguac
56th	2006–2010	Carmel Robichaud	Liberal
57th	2010–2014	Serge Robichaud	Progressive Conservative
58th	2014–2018	Lisa Harris	Liberal
59th	2018–2020	Lisa Harris	Liberal
60th	2020–2021	Lisa Harris	Liberal
60th	2022–2024	Réjean Savoie	Progressive Conservative
61st	2024–Present	Sam Johnston	Liberal

== Election results ==
=== Miramichi Bay-Neguac ===
2024 New Brunswick general election
Party	Candidate	Votes	%	±%
Liberal	Sam Johnston	4,219	52.24	+9.4
Progressive Conservative	Réjean Savoie	3,146	38.95	+12.3
Green	Wayne Hitchcock	711	8.80	-0.7
Total valid votes		8,076	99.72	
Total rejected ballots		23	0.28	
Turnout		8,099	64.76	
Eligible voters		12,507		
Liberal gain from Progressive Conservative		Swing		-1.4
Source: Elections New Brunswick

2020 provincial election redistributed results
Party	%
Liberal	42.8
Progressive Conservative	26.7
People's Alliance	19.5
Green	9.5
New Democratic	1.3
Independent	0.2

New Brunswick provincial by-election, June 20, 2022 Resignation of Lisa Harris
Party	Candidate	Votes	%	±%
Progressive Conservative	Réjean Savoie	2,286	44.98	+11.33
Liberal	Shawn Wood	1,753	34.49	-9.07
Green	Chad Duplessie	772	15.19	+5.10
People's Alliance	Thomas L'Huillier	172	3.38	-7.60
Independent	Hoss Sutherland	99	1.95	–
Total valid votes		5,082	99.82	
Total rejected ballots		9	0.18	-0.09
Turnout		5,091	42.08	-25.57
Eligible voters		12,098		
Progressive Conservative gain from Liberal		Swing		+10.20
Source: Elections New Brunswick

2020 New Brunswick general election
Party	Candidate	Votes	%	±%
Liberal	Lisa Harris	3,561	43.56	+1.59
Progressive Conservative	Robert Trevors	2,751	33.66	+12.85
People's Alliance	Thomas L'Huillier	898	10.99	-13.48
Green	Curtis Bartibogue	825	10.09	+5.92
New Democratic	Douglas Mullin	139	1.70	-6.88
Total valid votes		8,174	99.73	
Total rejected ballots		22	0.27	-0.02
Turnout		8,196	67.65	-2.59
Eligible voters		12,115		
Liberal hold		Swing		-5.63
Source: Elections New Brunswick

2018 New Brunswick general election
Party	Candidate	Votes	%	±%
Liberal	Lisa Harris	3,512	41.97	-7.25
People's Alliance	Terry Collette	2,047	24.47	–
Progressive Conservative	Debi Tozer	1,741	20.81	-17.96
New Democratic	Willie Robichaud	718	8.58	-0.62
Green	James "Junior" Denny	349	4.17	+1.36
Total valid votes		8,367	99.71	
Total rejected ballots		24	0.29	-0.08
Turnout		8,391	70.24	-1.01
Eligible voters		11,946		
Liberal hold		Swing		-15.86
Source: Elections New Brunswick

2014 New Brunswick general election
Party	Candidate	Votes	%	±%
Liberal	Lisa Harris	4,199	49.22	+11.84
Progressive Conservative	Serge Robichaud	3,307	38.76	-3.95
New Democratic	Curtis Bartibogue	785	9.20	-7.41
Green	Filip Vanicek	240	2.81	+1.46
Total valid votes		8,531	99.64	
Total rejected ballots		31	0.36	-0.55
Turnout		8,562	71.25	-5.64
Eligible voters		12,016		
Liberal notional gain from Progressive Conservative		Swing		+7.89
Source: Elections New Brunswick

2010 New Brunswick general election
Party	Candidate	Votes	%	±%
Progressive Conservative	Serge Robichaud	2,908	42.71	+14.08
Liberal	Carmel Robichaud	2,545	37.38	-7.96
New Democratic	Marc-Alphonse Leclair	1,131	16.61	-9.41
People's Alliance	Tommy L'Huillier	132	1.94	–
Green	Filip Vanicek	92	1.35	–
Total valid votes		6,808	99.08	
Total rejected ballots		63	0.92	+0.02
Turnout		6,871	76.89	+1.50
Eligible voters		8,936		
Progressive Conservative gain from Liberal		Swing		+11.02
Source: Elections New Brunswick

2006 New Brunswick general election
Party	Candidate	Votes	%	±%
Liberal	Carmel Robichaud	3,108	45.34	-0.72
Progressive Conservative	Guy Vautour	1,963	28.64	-14.90
New Democratic	Roger Duguay	1,784	26.02	+15.62
Total valid votes		6,855	99.10	
Total rejected ballots		62	0.90	-0.37
Turnout		6,917	75.39	-3.02
Eligible voters		9,175		
Liberal notional hold		Swing		+7.09
Source: Elections New Brunswick

=== Miramichi Bay ===
2003 New Brunswick general election
Party	Candidate	Votes	%	±%
Liberal	Carmel Robichaud	3,227	46.06	+4.88
Progressive Conservative	Réjean Savoie	3,050	43.53	-10.38
New Democratic	Hilaire Rousselle	729	10.41	+5.50
Total valid votes		7,006	98.73	
Total rejected ballots		90	1.27	+0.50
Turnout		7,096	78.41	-6.69
Eligible voters		9,050		
Liberal gain from Progressive Conservative		Swing		+7.63
Source: Elections New Brunswick

1999 New Brunswick general election
Party	Candidate	Votes	%	±%
Progressive Conservative	Réjean Savoie	4,014	53.92	+7.32
Liberal	Danny Gay	3,066	41.18	-7.65
New Democratic	Donald Doucet	365	4.90	+1.60
Total valid votes		7,445	99.23	
Total rejected ballots		58	0.77	-0.08
Turnout		7,503	85.10	+3.91
Eligible voters		8,817		
Progressive Conservative gain from Liberal		Swing		+7.48
Source: Elections New Brunswick

1995 New Brunswick general election
Party	Candidate	Votes	%	±%
Liberal	Danny Gay	3,504	48.83	-5.98
Progressive Conservative	James Gordon	3,344	46.60	+17.15
New Democratic	Mary M. Parker	237	3.30	-3.56
Confederation of Regions	Allison Furlotte	91	1.27	-7.61
Total valid votes		7,176	99.14	
Total rejected ballots		62	0.86	+0.21
Turnout		7,238	81.19	-2.45
Eligible voters		8,915		
Liberal hold		Swing		-11.57
Source: Elections New Brunswick

1991 New Brunswick general election
Party	Candidate	Votes	%	±%
Liberal	Danny Gay	3,940	54.81	-7.03
Progressive Conservative	Emilien LeBreton	2,117	29.45	-6.56
Confederation of Regions	James Grant MacIntosh	638	8.88	–
New Democratic	Norman A. Richardson	493	6.86	+4.71
Total valid votes		7,188	99.35	
Total rejected ballots		47	0.65	
Turnout		7,235	83.64	
Eligible voters		8,650		
Liberal hold		Swing		-0.24
Source: Elections New Brunswick

1987 New Brunswick general election
Party	Candidate	Votes	%	±%
Liberal	Donald "Danny" Gay	4,422	61.84	+15.54
Progressive Conservative	James K. "Jim" Gordon	2,575	36.01	-13.51
New Democratic	Joyce Carter	154	2.15	-2.02
Total valid votes		7,151	100.0	
Liberal gain		Swing		+14.52
Source: Elections New Brunswick

1982 New Brunswick general election
Party	Candidate	Votes	%	±%
Progressive Conservative	James K. "Jimmy" Gordon	3,263	49.52	+17.74
Liberal	Alcide Léger	3,051	46.30	+5.76
New Democratic	J. Albert Richardson	275	4.17	–
Total valid votes		6,589	100.0	
Progressive Conservative gain from Liberal		Swing		+5.99
Source: Elections New Brunswick

1978 New Brunswick general election
Party	Candidate	Votes	%	±%
Liberal	Edgar LeGresley	2,232	40.54	-20.44
Progressive Conservative	James Kenneth Gordon	1,750	31.78	-2.76
Independent	Solomon Curry	1,524	27.68	–
Total valid votes		5,506	100.0	
Liberal hold		Swing		-8.84
Source: Elections New Brunswick

1974 New Brunswick general election
Party	Candidate	Votes	%
Liberal	Edgar LeGresley	2,841	60.98
Progressive Conservative	George R. Savoie	1,609	34.54
New Democratic	Jean-Claude Morris	209	4.49
Total valid votes		4,659	100.0
The previous multi-member riding of Northumberland went totally Liberal in the last election, with Edgar LeGresley being one of five incumbents.
Source: Elections New Brunswick

== See also ==
- List of New Brunswick provincial electoral districts
- Canadian provincial electoral districts
