= Al Lacey =

Canadian politician (born 1942)

Member of the Legislative Assembly of New Brunswick
- In office 1987–1991
- Preceded by: Les Hull
- Succeeded by: Danny Cameron
- Constituency: York South

Personal details
- Born: Alfred William Lacey; January 31, 1942 (age 84) Saint John, New Brunswick
- Party: New Brunswick Liberal Association
- Spouse: Norma Faye Greer
- Children: 4
- Occupation: businessman

Alfred William Lacey (born January 31, 1942) is a former Canadian politician. He served in the Legislative Assembly of New Brunswick from 1987 to 1991 as a Liberal member from the constituency of York South.
