= Keith Ashfield =

Canadian politician (1952–2018)

The Honourable Keith Ashfield PC

Member of Parliament for Fredericton
- In office October 14, 2008 – October 19, 2015
- Preceded by: Andy Scott
- Succeeded by: Matt DeCourcey

Member of the New Brunswick Legislative Assembly for New Maryland-Sunbury West New Maryland (1999-2006)
- In office June 7, 1999 – September 8, 2008
- Preceded by: Joan Kingston
- Succeeded by: Jack Carr

Personal details
- Born: March 28, 1952 Fredericton, New Brunswick, Canada
- Died: April 22, 2018 (aged 66) Fredericton, New Brunswick, Canada
- Party: Conservative

Keith John Ashfield PC (March 28, 1952 – April 22, 2018) was a Canadian politician. He served as the member of Parliament (MP) for the electoral district of Fredericton from 2008 to 2015 and, before that, was a member of the New Brunswick Legislature from 1999 to 2008. He served in the federal cabinet in various capacities from 2008 to 2013.

== Early life ==
The son of Jack Ashfield and Nora Locke, he studied Business at the University of New Brunswick for two years.

== Political career ==
=== Provincial ===
Ashfield was a school trustee for a number of years and was first a candidate for the Legislative Assembly of New Brunswick in the 1991 election. A Progressive Conservative, Ashfield placed third with Confederation of Regions candidate Max White being victorious.

Ashfield was again a candidate in 1999 and was successful, defeating cabinet minister Joan Kingston in the riding of New Maryland. He was named deputy speaker of the Legislature. Ashfield faced Kingston again in 2003 and won again though by a closer margin. He was sworn in as Minister of Natural Resources & Energy on June 27, 2003. He was elected to a third term in 2006 in the redistributed district of New Maryland-Sunbury West, however he left the cabinet as his party formed the opposition following the election.

On March 6, 2018, Ashfield ran for the Progressive Conservative nomination in Oromocto-Lincoln-Fredericton. The nomination ultimately went to Mary Wilson.

=== Federal ===
On November 7, 2007, he won the nomination to be the candidate of the Conservative Party of Canada in Fredericton for the next federal election. When the election was called, he resigned his provincial seat. He was elected in the 2008 federal election and re-elected in the 2011 federal election. Ashfield was appointed Minister of Fisheries and Oceans on May 18, 2011.

Ashfield co-chaired the annual meeting of the Canadian Council of Fisheries and Aquaculture Ministers (CCFAM) in Victoria, British Columbia in 2012. Ministers discussed a range of issues such as aquaculture, aquatic invasive species, and protecting Canada's fisheries.

In March 2013, Ashfield faced criticism for a photo-op during which he remarked to the teenage daughter of a constituent, "Grace, you’re a great cook. You’re going to make a wonderful wife for somebody." Later that year, he was replaced as Minister of Fisheries and Oceans, and left the Cabinet.

He was defeated in the 2015 federal election.

== Personal life and death ==
In October 2012, Ashfield had a heart attack and temporarily gave his role to then National Revenue Minister Gail Shea. In June 2013, Ashfield announced he had been diagnosed with Hodgkin's lymphoma. When he declared his candidacy for the 2015 Canadian federal election, he had beaten his cancer that had returned in Fall 2014.

The Progressive Conservative Party of New Brunswick officially announced Keith Ashfield's death in the early afternoon of April 22, 2018.

== Electoral history ==
2015 Canadian federal election: Fredericton
Party	Candidate	Votes	%	±%	Expenditures
Liberal	Matt DeCourcey	23,016	49.26	+25.24	$98,991.33
Conservative	Keith Ashfield	13,280	28.42	-18.55	$79,507.14
Green	Mary Lou Babineau	5,804	12.42	+8.27	$159,022.44
New Democratic	Sharon Scott-Levesque	4,622	9.89	-14.41	–
Total valid votes/expense limit		46,722	100.0		$195,873.36
Total rejected ballots		188	0.40	–	
Turnout		46,910	77.43	–	
Eligible voters		60,587			
Liberal gain from Conservative		Swing		+21.90	
Source: Elections Canada

2011 Canadian federal election: Fredericton
Party	Candidate	Votes	%	±%	Expenditures
Conservative	Keith Ashfield	21,573	48.38	+5.85	$80,569.94
New Democratic	Jesse Travis	10,626	23.83	+8.47	$8,535.27
Liberal	Randy McKeen	10,336	23.18	-8.35	$53,834.28
Green	Louise Comeau	1,790	4.01	-6.15	$8,177.72
Independent	Adam Scott Ness	266	0.60	–	$101.69
Total valid votes/expense limit		44,591	100.0		$83,547.51
Total rejected, unmarked and declined ballots		207	0.46	-0.11	
Turnout		44,798	64.24	+2.11	
Eligible voters		69,732			
Conservative hold		Swing		-1.31	

2008 Canadian federal election: Fredericton
Party	Candidate	Votes	%	±%	Expenditures
Conservative	Keith Ashfield	17,962	42.53	+7.87	$73,954.11
Liberal	David Innes	13,319	31.53	-10.27	$64,776.23
New Democratic	Jesse Travis	6,490	15.36	-5.89	$6,944.89
Green	Mary Lou Babineau	4,293	10.16	+8.28	$8,526.99
Canadian Action	Ben Kelly	168	0.39	–	none listed
Total valid votes/expense limit		42,232	100.0		$80,195
Total rejected, unmarked and declined ballots		242	0.57	+0.13	
Turnout		42,474	62.13	-5.86	
Eligible voters		68,368			
Conservative gain from Liberal		Swing		+9.07	

28th Canadian Ministry (2006–2015) – Cabinet of Stephen Harper
Cabinet posts (4)
Predecessor	Office	Successor
Gail Shea	Minister of Fisheries and Oceans; 2011–2013	Gail Shea
Jean-Pierre Blackburn	Minister of National Revenue; 2010–2011	Gail Shea
Peter MacKay	Minister of the Atlantic Gateway; 2010–2013	Lisa Raitt
Peter MacKay	Minister of State (Atlantic Canada Opportunities Agency); 2008–2011	Bernard Valcourt
New Brunswick provincial government of Bernard Lord
Cabinet post (1)
Predecessor	Office	Successor
Jeannot Volpé	Minister of Natural Resources & Energy; 2003–2006	Donald Arseneault
