= Tilly O'Neill-Gordon =

Canadian politician

Member of Parliament for Miramichi
- In office October 14, 2008 – October 19, 2015
- Preceded by: Charles Hubbard
- Succeeded by: Pat Finnigan

Personal details
- Born: February 16, 1949 (age 77) Escuminac, New Brunswick, Canada
- Party: Conservative
- Profession: teacher

Tilly O'Neill-Gordon (born February 16, 1949) is a Canadian politician, represented the New Brunswick electoral district of Miramichi in the House of Commons from 2008 to 2015. She is a member of the Conservative Party.

== Biography ==
She was born to Tom and Carmel (Jimmo) O’Neill. Her family moved to the Chatham, New Brunswick in 1961 and she graduated St. Michael's Academy in 1967. After graduating she attended Teachers’ College in Fredericton and began teaching in 1970 in her native village of Escuminac. In 1972 she was transferred to Nelson-Miramichi followed by another transfer the next year to Chatham Head. She remained there for 15 years until the school closed officially in 1988, when she was transferred to Ian Baillie Primary until retirement in 2003. She then re-entered the teaching profession a year later at Burnt Church and was employed there until being elected.

== Transition into politics ==
O'Neill-Gordon had been teaching in a classroom for a week when she was asked to run. She took a leave of absence she thought would only last six weeks. O'Neill-Gordon ended up defeating the Liberal incumbent, becoming the third Conservative MP in Miramichi since 1867.

== Personal life ==
She has four sisters, three live in the Miramichi area and the other in Bathurst. Her ex-husband James Gordon was a MLA representing Miramichi Bay from 1982 to 1987.
