= Edgar LeGresley =

Canadian politician

Member of the Legislative Assembly of New Brunswick
- In office 1974–1982
- Preceded by: none, first member
- Succeeded by: James Gordon
- Constituency: Miramichi Bay

Personal details
- Born: August 20, 1940 Neguac, New Brunswick
- Died: September 7, 2007 (aged 67) Moncton, New Brunswick
- Party: New Brunswick Liberal Association
- Spouse: Muriel Carmella Savoy
- Children: 3
- Occupation: businessman

Bernard Edgar LeGresley (August 20, 1940 – September 7, 2007) was a Canadian politician. He served in the Legislative Assembly of New Brunswick from 1974 to 1982 as a Liberal member from the constituency of Miramichi Bay.
