= Carmel Robichaud =

Canadian politician and teacher

Member of the New Brunswick Legislative Assembly for Miramichi Bay-Neguac Miramichi Bay (2003-2006)
- In office June 9, 2003 – September 27, 2010
- Preceded by: Réjean Savoie
- Succeeded by: Serge Robichaud

Personal details
- Born: Neguac, New Brunswick
- Party: Liberal
- Occupation: teacher

Carmel Robichaud is a politician and retired teacher in New Brunswick, Canada. She is a member of Legislative Assembly of New Brunswick representing the electoral district of Miramichi Bay-Neguac.

== Early life ==
Born in Neguac, New Brunswick, the daughter of Côme Robichaud, Robichaud's career spanned 35 years from teaching kindergarten to high school, in both official languages. In 1959 she received her Teacher's License from the New Brunswick Teachers' College in Fredericton. She holds a teacher's diploma from the Université de Montreal (1989), a Bachelor of Teaching from St. Thomas University; and a Bachelor of Arts from the Université de Moncton. In 1990, she completed the Principal's In-Service Program in Fredericton and, in 1995, the leadership program at Le Centre de Leadership en Education at the University of Ottawa. In 1997 she received her Master of Education in School Administration from the Université de Moncton. She has been a teacher, a coordinator of the French as a second language and immersion program, a French department head, and a vice-principal. She was also a university professor at Memorial University of Newfoundland and the University of New Brunswick. She has worked in the school systems of the provinces of New Brunswick, Ontario, and Quebec.

== Political career ==
She was first elected to the Legislative Assembly of New Brunswick on June 9, 2003. As the Liberal member for Miramichi Bay, she was the official opposition critic for areas of interest relating to education and the status of women. She was chair of the Standing Committee on Education.

She was re-elected in 2006 and joined the cabinet.

New Brunswick provincial government of Shawn Graham
Cabinet posts (2)
| Predecessor | Office | Successor |
| Victor Boudreau | Minister of Local Government; 2007–2008 | Bernard LeBlanc |
| Madeleine Dubé | Minister of Family and Community Services; 2006–2007 | Mary Schryer |
Special Cabinet Responsibilities
| Predecessor | Title | Successor |
| none | Minister responsible for community non-profit organizations 2007–2008 new designation | Brian Kenny |
| Joan MacAlpine-Stiles | Minister responsible for the Status of Women; 2006–2007 | Mary Schryer |
