= LeRoy Washburn =

Canadian politician (1934–2019)

MLA for Oromocto
- In office 1974–1982
- Succeeded by: Joseph Mombourquette

Personal details
- Born: June 16, 1934 Blackville, New Brunswick
- Died: April 13, 2019 (aged 84) Oromocto, New Brunswick
- Party: New Brunswick Liberal Association

LeRoy James Washburn (June 16, 1934 – April 13, 2019) was a Canadian politician. He served in the Legislative Assembly of New Brunswick from 1974 to 1982, as a Liberal member for the constituency of Oromocto.
