= Mike Holland (politician) =

Canadian politician (born 1970)

The Honourable Mike Holland MLA
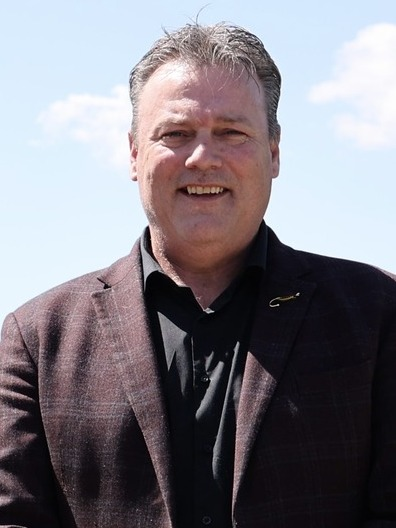
- Holland in 2024

Minister of Energy and Resource Development
- In office November 9, 2018 – June 20, 2024
- Premier: Blaine Higgs
- Preceded by: Roger Melanson
- Succeeded by: Ted Flemming

Minister of Indigenous Affairs
- In office February 2, 2024 – June 20, 2024
- Premier: Blaine Higgs
- Preceded by: Arlene Dunn
- Succeeded by: Réjean Savoie

Member of the New Brunswick Legislative Assembly for Albert
- In office September 24, 2018 – June 20, 2024
- Preceded by: Brian Keirstead

Personal details
- Born: 1970 (age 55–56)
- Party: Progressive Conservative

Mike Holland (born 1970) is a Canadian politician, who was elected to the Legislative Assembly of New Brunswick in the 2018 election. He represented the electoral district of Albert as a member of the Progressive Conservative Party of New Brunswick until 2024.

Holland was appointed Minister of Natural Resources and Energy Development in November 2018 and reappointed to the position after the NB general election of 2020.

Holland has served on the Provincial Treasury Board as well as the Provincial Policy and Priority Board

Holland was re-elected in the 2020 provincial election.

Holland has argued that New Brunswick cannot meet the Canadian federal deadline for phasing out the use of coal for electricity by 2030, which is an international commitment that Canada has made as part of its Nationally Determined Contribution to the Paris Agreement as part of the Pan-Canadian Framework.

In 2020 Holland was awarded with the Canadian Wildlife Federation's "Past President's Canadian Legislator Award". This award is presented annually to an elected official, territorial, or federal legislators in recognition of a significant contribution to the conservation of wildlife in Canada.

In 2020 Holland received the "Sportsman of the Year" award from the New Brunswick Wildlife Federation for his work that doubled the protected areas in New Brunswick.

In 2023 Holland was awarded the 2022-2023 Sportsman of the Year by The Ruffed Grouse Society of Canada in Fredericton NB.

Holland was awarded the Waterfowling Legacy Award 2023-2024 from Delta Waterfowl.

On February 2, 2024, Holland announced that he would not be a candidate in the next provincial election but would remain in the legislature until then. However, on June 20, 2024, he resigned as a cabinet minister and MLA, ahead of the election.

== Election results ==
=== Albert-Riverview ===
2020 New Brunswick general election
Party	Candidate	Votes	%	±%
Progressive Conservative	Mike Holland	5,040	62.35	+19.56
Green	Jenny O'Neill	1,056	13.06	+2.36
People's Alliance	Sharon Buchanan	977	12.09	-6.93
Liberal	Kelly Nagle	921	11.39	-10.43
Independent	James Wilson	90	1.11	+0.04
Total valid votes		8,084		
Total rejected ballots		5	0.06	-0.13
Turnout		8,089	64.11	-0.45
Eligible voters		12,617		
Progressive Conservative hold		Swing		+8.60
Source: Elections New Brunswick

2018 New Brunswick general election
Party	Candidate	Votes	%	±%
Progressive Conservative	Mike Holland	3,479	42.78	+2.00
Liberal	Catherine Black	1,775	21.83	-6.41
People's Alliance	Sharon Buchanan	1,546	19.01	+11.35
Green	Moranda van Geest	870	10.70	-1.28
New Democratic	Betty Weir	375	4.61	-6.74
Independent	James Wilson	87	1.07	--
Total valid votes		8,132	100.0	
Total rejected ballots		16		
Turnout		8,148	64.6	
Eligible voters		12,620		
Source: Elections New Brunswick
