= Tom Gilbert (politician) =

Canadian politician

MLA for Oromocto
- In office 1987–1991
- Preceded by: Joseph Mombourquette
- Succeeded by: Ab Rector

Personal details
- Born: June 15, 1926 Oromocto, New Brunswick
- Died: December 22, 2016 (aged 90) Fredericton, New Brunswick
- Party: New Brunswick Liberal Association

Thomas William Gilbert (June 15, 1926 – December 22, 2016) was a Canadian politician. He served in the Legislative Assembly of New Brunswick from 1987 to 1991, as a Liberal member for the constituency of Oromocto.
