= Jack Carr (politician) =

Canadian politician (born 1975)

Member of the New Brunswick Legislative Assembly for New Maryland-Sunbury West
- In office November 3, 2008 – September 22, 2014
- Preceded by: Keith Ashfield
- Succeeded by: Jeff Carr

Personal details
- Born: July 3, 1975 (age 50) Saint John, New Brunswick
- Party: Progressive Conservative
- Relatives: Jeff Carr, Jody Carr (brothers)

Jack Carr (born July 3, 1975 in Saint John, New Brunswick) is a politician in the province of New Brunswick, Canada. He was elected to the Legislative Assembly of New Brunswick in a byelection on November 3, 2008, as the Progressive Conservative MLA for New Maryland-Sunbury West.

He is the twin brother of his caucus colleague Jody Carr.

He did not run for reelection in the 2014 provincial election. His older brother Jeff Carr was named as the Progressive Conservative candidate in New Maryland-Sunbury, and won the election.
