= Harold A. Terris =

Canadian politician

Member of the Legislative Assembly of New Brunswick
- In office 1987–1991
- Preceded by: Malcolm MacLeod
- Succeeded by: Beverly Brine
- Constituency: Tantramar

Personal details
- Born: December 11, 1916 Hillsborough, New Brunswick
- Died: April 22, 2001 (aged 84) Riverside-Albert, New Brunswick
- Party: New Brunswick Liberal Association
- Spouse: Arleen M. Betts
- Children: 2
- Occupation: pilot

Harold Allison Terris (December 11, 1916 – April 22, 2001) was a military pilot, civil servant, and politician in the province of New Brunswick, Canada.

Terris was born in Hillsborough, New Brunswick in 1916. During World War II, Harold Terris served overseas as a Spitfire pilot with the Royal Canadian Air Force. After the War, he worked as a civil servant for the province of New Brunswick. In 1987 he was the successful Liberal Party candidate for the riding of Albert, defeating incumbent Malcolm MacLeod. Terris chose not to seek reelection in 1991.

He married Arleen M. Betts (1921–2008) of Doaktown, New Brunswick. The couple had a daughter, Susan, and a son, James.
