= Norman Betts =

Canadian politician

Norman M. Betts
- Born: April 1, 1954 (age 72); Doaktown, New Brunswick; Canada
- Education: University of New Brunswick, Queen's University
- Occupations: Chartered Accountant, University Professor, Politician
- Political party: Progressive Conservative
- Children: 5 children

Norman M. Betts (born April 1, 1954 in Doaktown, New Brunswick) is a Chartered Accountant, university professor, and former provincial politician.

Norman Betts graduated from the University of New Brunswick (UNB) in 1978 with a Bachelor of Business Administration degree and went to work for a firm of chartered accountants in Fredericton, New Brunswick with whom he remained associated until 1988. In 1991, he obtained a PhD in Management (accounting and finance) from Queen's University in Kingston, Ontario. The following year joined the Faculty of Business Administration at the University of New Brunswick as an associate professor where he held various responsibilities including Assistant Dean of the Master of Business Administration program.

In 1997, Norman Betts was an unsuccessful candidate for the leadership of the Progressive Conservative Party of New Brunswick in a contest won by Bernard Lord. The Party was voted in power in the 1999 New Brunswick general election and Betts won a seat in the Southwest Miramichi riding and was immediately appointed Minister of Finance. Betts held the position until October 9, 2001 when he was made the Minister of Business New Brunswick.

In the June 9, 2003 New Brunswick general election, Norman Betts lost his seat to Liberal Party candidate, Rick Brewer. Betts then returned to his teaching job at the University of New Brunswick. He has served on the board of directors of several companies including Tembec Inc. and on the board of the Nature Conservancy for the Atlantic Canada region. In 2005, he was appointed to the Advisory Committee of the Atlantic Canada Chapter of the Institute of Corporate Directors.

Norman Betts was appointed to the board of directors of the Bank of Canada in June 2014.

New Brunswick provincial government of Bernard Lord
Cabinet posts (2)
Predecessor	Office	Successor
Peter Mesheau	'Minister of Business New Brunswick'; 2001–2003	Joan MacAlpine
Edmond Blanchard	'Minister of Finance'; 1999–2001	Peter Mesheau
