= Rick Brewer =

Canadian politician

Member of the New Brunswick Legislative Assembly for Southwest Miramichi
- In office June 9, 2003 – September 27, 2010
- Preceded by: Norm Betts
- Succeeded by: Jake Stewart

Personal details
- Party: Liberal

Rick Brewer (born in Stanley, New Brunswick) is a New Brunswick businessman and politician, and a former assistant pastor.

== Early life ==
Brewer was the son of Richard C. Brewer and Emma Hanson. He was an assistant pastor in the Pentecostal Church. Brewer has been involved in business for most of his life, largely in the grocery industry. He has been involved in the grocery industry for the past 33 years, beginning with the wholesale business at Willett Foods and The Food Group Inc. He then entered the retail market as the manager and supervisor of five convenience stores.

== Political career ==
He was elected to the Legislative Assembly of New Brunswick in the 2003 election to represent the riding of Southwest Miramichi, defeating cabinet minister Norman Betts. A Liberal, he has been the critic of the Department of Supply and Services since the election. On July 6, 2006 he was named chair of the Opposition's Petroleum Products Pricing Task Force, established in the wake of gas price regulation taking effect in New Brunswick on July 1.

He was re-elected in the 2006 election despite a strong challenge from former MLA Brent Taylor. Following the election, on November 7, 2006, he was named whip for the government caucus. On November 12, 2008, he was added to the cabinet. He served as Minister of Human Resources and Minister responsible for Aboriginal Affairs until September 2010. Presently (fall of 2010) Rick & Ruth are involved in building a school in Iquitos, Peru. Rick recently received his Clergy license with Faith Christian Fellowship of Canada.

== Personal life ==
Brewer is married with two children and operates a convenience store in Boiestown.

== Notes ==
New Brunswick provincial government of Shawn Graham
Cabinet post (1)
Predecessor	Office	Successor
Wally Stiles	Minister of Human Resources; 2008–2010	Blaine Higgs
Special Cabinet Responsibilities
Predecessor	Title	Successor
Ed Doherty	Minister responsible for Aboriginal Affairs; 2008–2010	
