= Lisa Harris (politician) =

Canadian politician

Lisa Harris MLA
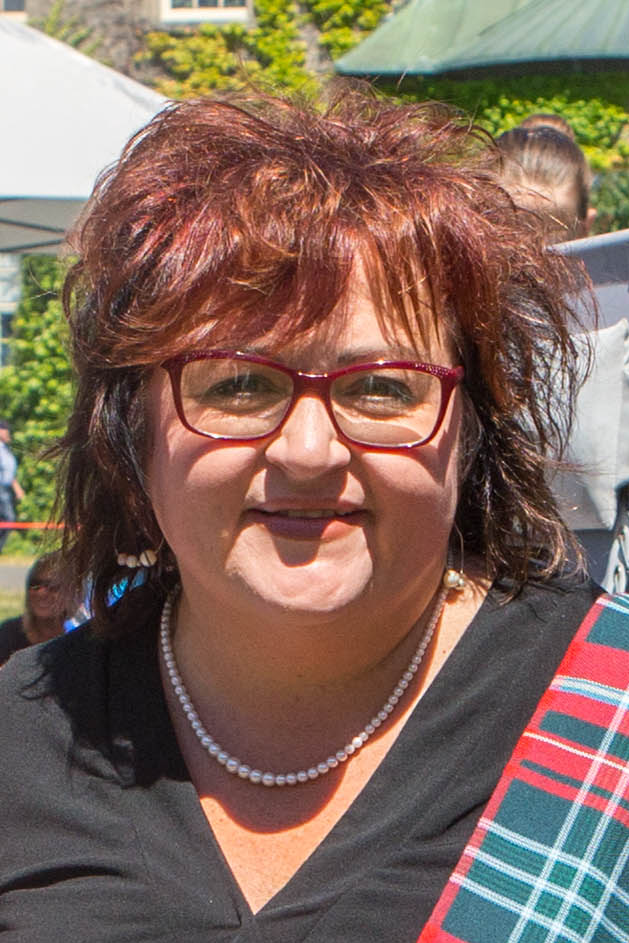
- Harris in 2017

Minister of Seniors and Long-Term Care
- In office June 6, 2016 – November 8, 2018
- Premier: Brian Gallant
- Preceded by: Cathy Rogers (Social Development)
- Succeeded by: Dorothy Shephard (Social Development)

Member of the New Brunswick Legislative Assembly for Miramichi Bay-Neguac
- In office September 22, 2014 – August 17, 2021
- Preceded by: Serge Robichaud
- Succeeded by: Réjean Savoie

Personal details
- Party: New Brunswick Liberal Association
- Other political affiliations: Liberal Party of Canada

Lisa Lynn Harris is a Canadian politician, who was elected to the Legislative Assembly of New Brunswick in the 2014 provincial election. She represented the electoral district of Miramichi Bay-Neguac as a member of the Liberal Party. She resigned on August 17, 2021, to run federally in the riding of Miramichi—Grand Lake in the 2021 federal election, but was defeated by the Conservative candidate, Jake Stewart.

Harris served as provincial Minister of Seniors and Long-Term Care from 2016 to 2018. She was re-elected in the 2018 and 2020 provincial elections.

At the time of the 2025 Canadian federal election, she lived in Miramichi, New Brunswick.

== Electoral record ==
2025 Canadian federal election: Miramichi—Grand Lake
Party	Candidate	Votes	%	±%	Expenditures
Conservative	Mike Dawson	18,421	48.15	+2.69	
Liberal	Lisa Harris	18,037	47.15	+10.15	
New Democratic	Josh Floyd	968	2.53	-4.86	
Green	Matthew Ian Clark	831	2.17	-2.52	
Total valid votes/expense limit		38,257	99.22	+0.11	
Total rejected ballots		302	0.78	-0.12	
Turnout		38,559	74.30	+7.0	
Eligible voters		51,896			
Conservative hold		Swing		-3.73	
Source: Elections Canada
Note: number of eligible voters does not include voting day registrations.

2020 New Brunswick general election
Party	Candidate	Votes	%	±%
Liberal	Lisa Harris	3,561	43.56	+1.59
Progressive Conservative	Robert Trevors	2,751	33.66	+12.85
People's Alliance	Thomas L'Huillier	898	10.99	-13.48
Green	Curtis Bartibogue	825	10.09	+5.92
New Democratic	Douglas Mullin	139	1.70	-6.88
Total valid votes		8,174	99.73	
Total rejected ballots		22	0.27	-0.02
Turnout		8,196	67.65	-2.59
Eligible voters		12,115		
Liberal hold		Swing		-5.63
Source: Elections New Brunswick

2018 New Brunswick general election
Party	Candidate	Votes	%	±%
Liberal	Lisa Harris	3,512	41.97	-7.25
People's Alliance	Terry Collette	2,047	24.47	–
Progressive Conservative	Debi Tozer	1,741	20.81	-17.96
New Democratic	Willie Robichaud	718	8.58	-0.62
Green	James "Junior" Denny	349	4.17	+1.36
Total valid votes		8,367	99.71	
Total rejected ballots		24	0.29	-0.08
Turnout		8,391	70.24	-1.01
Eligible voters		11,946		
Liberal hold		Swing		-15.86
Source: Elections New Brunswick

2014 New Brunswick general election
Party	Candidate	Votes	%	±%
Liberal	Lisa Harris	4,199	49.22	+11.84
Progressive Conservative	Serge Robichaud	3,307	38.76	-3.95
New Democratic	Curtis Bartibogue	785	9.20	-7.41
Green	Filip Vanicek	240	2.81	+1.46
Total valid votes		8,531	99.64	
Total rejected ballots		31	0.36	-0.55
Turnout		8,562	71.25	-5.64
Eligible voters		12,016		
Liberal notional gain from Progressive Conservative		Swing		+7.89
Source: Elections New Brunswick
