= Arch Pafford =

Canadian politician

Leader of the Confederation of Regions Party
- In office 1985–1988?
- Preceded by: Elmer Knutson
- Succeeded by: Party dissolved

Leader of the New Brunswick Confederation of Regions Party
- In office 1988–1991
- Preceded by: Party founded
- Succeeded by: Danny Cameron

Personal details
- Born: October 21, 1941 Corner Brook, Dominion of Newfoundland
- Died: June 5, 2024 (aged 82) Miramichi, New Brunswick
- Party: Confederation of Regions Party (1985-1988) New Brunswick Confederation of Regions Party (1988-2001) Grey Party of Canada (2001-present)

Arch C. Pafford (October 21, 1941 – June 5, 2024) was a Canadian politician in New Brunswick.

In the 1988 federal election, he ran for office as a candidate of the Confederation of Regions Party of Canada (CoR). He placed third with 10.7 per cent of the vote in the riding of Miramichi. CoR did surprisingly well in New Brunswick, with 4.3 per cent of the popular vote, considering it was a Western Canada-based party whose national results were less than one-half of one per cent.

Due to this success, Pafford and other CoR supporters founded the New Brunswick Confederation of Regions Party, a party to contest provincial elections. The party attracted a lot of support in anglophone areas of the province because of the collapse of the Progressive Conservative Party of New Brunswick in the 1987 election, and resentment against PC Premier Richard Hatfield's support of official bilingualism.

The CoR party won eight seats in the 1991 New Brunswick election, and formed the official opposition. Pafford did not win a seat, finishing in third place in his Newcastle riding. As a result, Pafford resigned the leadership.

In 1995, Pafford ran for mayor of the new city of Miramichi, but was defeated. He largely withdrew from the political scene but participated with other former CoR members in founding the Grey Party of Canada in 2001. He re-entered politics in 2004 when he again ran for mayor of Miramichi. He finished in a distant fourth of four candidates with 9.6 per cent of the vote, while the other three candidates were virtually tied with approximately 30 per cent of the vote each.
