= Jody Carr =

Canadian politician (born 1975)

Jody Carr MLA

Minister of Post-Secondary Education
- In office 15 September 2013 – 8 October 2014
- Premier: David Alward
- Preceded by: Martine Coulombe
- Succeeded by: Francine Landry
- In office 14 February 2006 – 3 October 2006
- Premier: Bernard Lord
- Preceded by: Madeleine Dubé
- Succeeded by: Ed Doherty

Minister of Education
- In office 12 October 2010 – 23 September 2013
- Premier: David Alward
- Preceded by: Roland Haché
- Succeeded by: Marie-Claude Blais

Member of the New Brunswick Legislative Assembly for Oromocto-Gagetown
- In office June 7, 1999 – 2006
- Preceded by: Vaughn Blaney
- Succeeded by: Riding redistributed

Member of the New Brunswick Legislative Assembly for Oromocto
- In office 2006–2014
- Preceded by: First Member
- Succeeded by: Riding redistributed

Member of the New Brunswick Legislative Assembly for Oromocto-Lincoln-Fredericton
- In office 2014–2018
- Preceded by: First Member
- Succeeded by: Mary Wilson

Dean of the Legislative Assembly of New Brunswick
- In office August 21, 2014 – August 23, 2018 Serving with David Alward (2014 – 2015); Madeleine Dubé (2014 – 2018); Trevor Holder; Kirk MacDonald
- Preceded by: Dale Graham

Personal details
- Born: 3 July 1975 (age 51) Saint John, New Brunswick
- Party: Progressive Conservative
- Spouse: Krista Carr
- Children: Taylor Carr Madison Carr
- Relatives: Jack Carr, Jeff Carr (brothers)

Jody Rochelle Carr (born July 3, 1975) is a Canadian politician. He is a former member of the Legislative Assembly of New Brunswick, from 1999 to 2018, and served in the cabinet for part of 2006 as well as 2010-2014.

== Political career ==
He first got involved with politics in 1993 just after graduating from Oromocto High School as class president by volunteering in the 1993 federal election.

While still in university, Carr ran in the riding of Oromocto-Gagetown for the first time in the 1995 provincial election and was the youngest ever Progressive Conservative candidate for MLA in New Brunswick at the age of 20. Carr received 28% of the vote which was the best showing of all 8 PC candidates in the greater Fredericton Region. Though he was defeated in that election, he stayed involved in his riding and his party and co-chaired the 1997 leadership convention which elected Bernard Lord. Carr kept active in his riding while finishing his university degree at the University of New Brunswick. After graduating with a Bachelor of Business Administration Carr worked under Lord in the office of the official opposition before being elected with nearly 64% of the vote in the 1999 election at age 23. He was re-elected in 2003 with 62% of the vote.

On February 14, 2006, Carr was named to the cabinet of Bernard Lord overseeing the new portfolio of Post-secondary Education and Training.

Carr was re-elected in the new riding of Oromocto in 2006 with 66% of the vote. However, the PC Party lost government and formed the opposition despite winning the popular vote.

On November 3, 2008, Carr's twin brother, Jack, was elected to the Legislative Assembly of New Brunswick in a byelection in the electoral district of New Maryland-Sunbury West.

On September 27, 2010, Carr was re-elected with over 81% of the vote. His closest opponent garnered only 12% in the Oromocto riding.

Carr was reelected in the redistributed riding of Oromocto-Lincoln in the 2014 provincial election. His brother Jack did not stand for reelection, but was instead succeeded by their older brother Jeff.

== Personal life ==
Jody Rochelle Carr was born on July 3, 1975, in Saint John, New Brunswick. He has an older brother Jeff Carr and is the twin brother to Jack Carr. The family moved to Geary, New Brunswick, shortly after Carr's birth. Carr attended Oromocto High School and graduated in 1993. He then pursued a business degree from the University of New Brunswick.

In 2001, Carr married Krista Barker and they now have two children. In 2014, Carr went back to school to pursue a law degree and graduated in 2018. He is now a lawyer and has since opened his own law firm, Jody R. Carr Law Office.
