= Jeff Carr (Canadian politician) =

Canadian politician

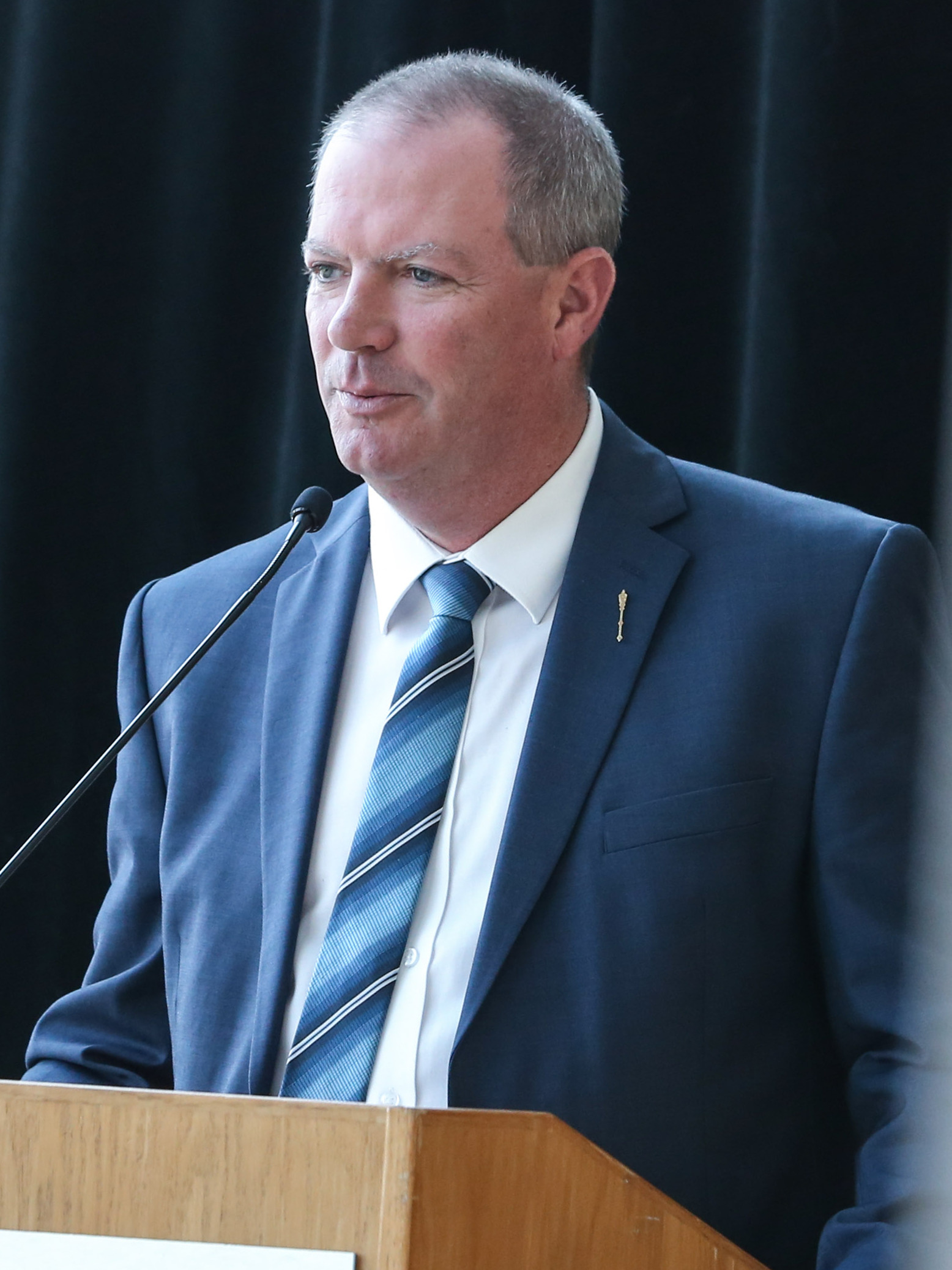
- Carr in 2019

Minister of Transportation and Infrastructure
- In office October 13, 2022 – June 27, 2023
- Preceded by: Jill Green
- Succeeded by: Richard Ames

Minister of Environment and Local Government
- In office November 9, 2018 – September 29, 2020
- Premier: Blaine Higgs
- Preceded by: Andrew Harvey
- Succeeded by: Gary Crossman (Environment and Climate Change); Daniel Allain (Local Government and Local Governance Reform)

Member of the New Brunswick Legislative Assembly for New Maryland-Sunbury
- In office September 22, 2014 – September 19, 2024
- Preceded by: Jack Carr

Personal details
- Born: February 7
- Party: Progressive Conservative
- Relatives: Jack Carr, Jody Carr (brothers)

Jeff Basil Carr (born February 7) is a Canadian politician, who was elected to the Legislative Assembly of New Brunswick in the 2014 provincial election. He represented the electoral district of New Maryland-Sunbury as a member of the Progressive Conservatives from 2014 until 2024.

Throughout his political career, Carr spent three terms as a Member of the Legislative Assembly and was appointed twice as a cabinet minister, first as the Minister of Environment and Local Government and secondly as the Minister of Transportation and Infrastructure until being removed by Blaine Higgs in 2023 for supporting an opposing motion on Policy 713. On February 27, 2024, Carr announced that he would be leaving politics and would not run in the next election.

== Political career ==
Following his re-election in 2018, Carr was appointed as Minister of Environment and Local Government. Carr was re-elected in the 2020 provincial election.

Following premier Blaine Higgs's revision of Policy 713, Carr, then serving as the Minister of Transportation and Infrastructure, expressed his “extreme disappointment in a lack of process and transparency” in a jointly signed letter with fellow cabinet minister Daniel Allain. On June 27, 2023, Higgs dismissed both Carr and Allain from their cabinet positions, citing a breach of cabinet solidarity due to their support for the opposition motion on the policy. Carr and Allain, along with resigned ministers Dorothy Shephard and Trevor Holder, all voted with the opposition parties on June 15 which favoured a Liberal motion which opposed the policy revision and called for increased consultation on the policy. Carr and Allain were both relegated to backbencher positions, and new ministers were appointed to fill their cabinet roles. In an interview with CBC News, Carr, who remained a Progressive-Conservative MLA, expressed his disagreement with Higgs's leadership style.

On February 27, 2024, Carr announced on Twitter that he would be leaving politics and would not be running in the next election. On October 21, 2024, during election night for the 2024 general election, Carr spoke with CBC News, stating that Liberal leader Susan Holt "sustained a terribly negative hate attack campaign" by the Progressive Conservative party, calling for Higgs to apologize to Holt.

== Personal life ==
Carr is the older brother of Jack Carr, his predecessor as MLA for New Maryland-Sunbury, and Jody Carr, the previous MLA for the neighbouring district of Oromocto-Lincoln.

Prior to his election to the legislature, he worked as an executive assistant in his brother Jody's office when he was the Minister of Education and later as Minister of Post-Secondary Education, Training and Labour.
