= Jake Stewart (politician) =

Canadian politician (born 1978)

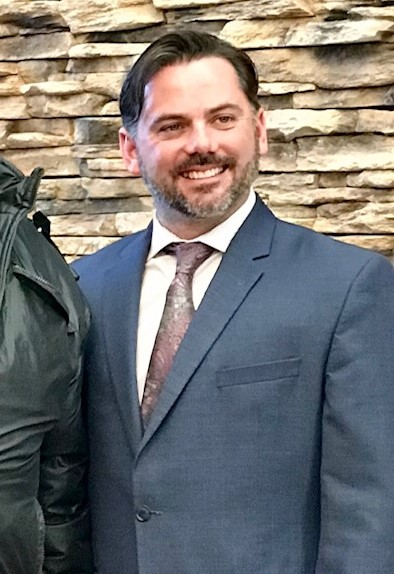
- Stewart in 2020

Member of Parliament for Miramichi—Grand Lake
- In office September 20, 2021 – March 23, 2025
- Preceded by: Pat Finnigan
- Succeeded by: Michael Dawson

Minister of Aboriginal Affairs for New Brunswick
- In office November 9, 2018 – September 29, 2020
- Premier: Blaine Higgs
- Preceded by: Roger Melanson
- Succeeded by: Arlene Dunn

Member of the New Brunswick Legislative Assembly for Southwest Miramichi-Bay du Vin (Southwest Miramichi; 2010–2014)
- In office September 27, 2010 – August 17, 2021
- Preceded by: Rick Brewer
- Succeeded by: Michael Dawson (2022)

Blackville City Councillor
- In office October 2008 – October 2010

Personal details
- Born: Jake Daniel Stewart; March 10, 1978 (age 48) Newcastle, New Brunswick, Canada
- Party: Conservative
- Other political affiliations: Progressive Conservative

Jake Daniel Stewart (born March 10, 1978) is a Canadian politician who was elected to the Legislative Assembly of New Brunswick in the 2010 provincial election. He represented the electoral district of Southwest Miramichi as a member of the Progressive Conservatives. He resigned on August 17, 2021 and was elected the Conservative Member of Parliament for the riding of Miramichi—Grand Lake on September 20, 2021 and served for one term, not running for re-election in 2025.

== Political career ==
=== Provincial politics ===
Stewart entered municipal politics in 2008, having run for the office of councillor in his hometown of Blackville. In 2010, he entered provincial politics, and defeated incumbent Liberal MLA Rick Brewer, who at that time was the Minister of Human Resources.

Stewart was a member of the Standing Committees on Education, Private Bills, Procedure, Public Accounts, and Chaired the Standing Committee on Legislative Officers. He has also been appointed by Jody Carr, then current Minister of Education to sit on the Ministerial Advisory Committee on Positive Learning and Working Environment (Anti Bullying).

Re-elected in 2014, Stewart was the opposition critic for Energy and Mines, and Aboriginal Affairs. He was also a member of the Standing Committee on Economic Policy.

In 2016, he entered the Progressive Conservative leadership race. In 2018, he was appointed as minister of Aboriginal Affairs but was dropped after the 2020 election.

=== Federal politics ===
Stewart resigned on August 17, 2021, and was elected the Conservative Member of Parliament for the riding of Miramichi—Grand Lake on September 20, 2021.

On February 25, 2025, the Telegraph-Journal reported that the financial agent for the Stewart's riding association had quit his post in January over allegations that he was mistreated by Stewart and his staff. The allegations were based on the fact that financial agent observed that Stewart made unauthorized expenses exceeding $500 limit established for transparency and never disclosed them to the board. Jacques Poitras of CBC News reported that Brennan also named eight other staffers that had left their jobs during Stewart's tenure. On March 3, 2025, Mike Morrison, a former Conservative candidate for Miramichi, confirmed some of the people to Poitras and stated that Stewart's temper played a role in their departures. Morrison added that he felt that many of Stewart's own staff and volunteers had alienated and took issues to Stewart mocking Morrison having a stroke last December. The Toronto Star revealed that Stewart terminated an employee from a two month medical leave without any communication or consideration for their recovery.

On March 6, 2025, Stewart announced that he is not running for re-election during the 2025 federal election.

== Electoral record ==
=== Federal ===
2021 Canadian federal election: Miramichi—Grand Lake
Party	Candidate	Votes	%	±%	Expenditures
Conservative	Jake Stewart	14,218	43.7	+8.0	$105,621.33
Liberal	Lisa Harris	12,762	39.3	+2.5	$61,063.68
New Democratic	Bruce Potter	2,291	7.0	-1.3	$0.00
People's	Ron Nowlan	1,839	5.7	+2.3	$7,358.46
Green	Patricia Deitch	1,393	4.3	-7.0	$0.00
Total valid votes/expense limit		32,503	99.1	–	$106,042.83
Total rejected ballots		306	0.9		
Turnout		32,809	67.3		
Eligible voters		48,779			
Conservative gain from Liberal		Swing		+2.8	
Source: Elections Canada

=== Provincial ===
2020 New Brunswick general election: Southwest Miramichi-Bay du Vin
Party	Candidate	Votes	%	±%
Progressive Conservative	Jake Stewart	3,887	47.97	+12.55
People's Alliance	Art O'Donnell	2,268	27.99	-7.01
Liberal	Josh McCormack	1,760	21.72	-1.12
New Democratic	Glenna Hanley	188	2.32	+1.16
Total valid votes		8,103	99.75	
Total rejected ballots		20	0.25	-0.04
Turnout		8,123	71.87	-2.28
Eligible voters		11,303		
Progressive Conservative hold		Swing		+9.78
Source: Elections New Brunswick

2018 New Brunswick general election: Southwest Miramichi-Bay du Vin
Party	Candidate	Votes	%	±%
Progressive Conservative	Jake Stewart	2,960	35.42%	
People's Alliance	Art O'Donnell	2,925	35.00%	
Liberal	Andy Hardy	1,909	22.84%	
Green	Byron J. Connors	447	5.35%	
New Democratic	Roger Vautour	97	1.16%	
KISS	Dawson Brideau	19	0.23%	
Total valid votes		8,357		
Total rejected ballots				
Turnout				
Eligible voters				

2014 New Brunswick general election: Southwest Miramichi-Bay du Vin
Party	Candidate	Votes	%	±%
Progressive Conservative	Jake Stewart	3,837	47.62	-10.95
Liberal	Norma Smith	2,951	36.63	+6.45
People's Alliance	Wes Gullison	694	8.61	+3.61
New Democratic	Douglas Mullin	361	4.48	+1.37
Green	Kevin W. Matthews	214	2.66	-0.48
Total valid votes		8,057	100.0	
Total rejected ballots		27	0.33	
Turnout		8,084	71.02	
Eligible voters		11,382		
Progressive Conservative notional hold		Swing		-8.70

2010 New Brunswick general election: Southwest Miramichi
Party	Candidate	Votes	%	±%
Progressive Conservative	Jake Stewart	3,786	58.57	+14.05
Liberal	Rick Brewer	1,951	30.18	-21.90
People's Alliance	Wes Gullison	323	5.00	–
Green	Jimmy D. Lawlor	203	3.14	–
New Democratic	Jason Robar	201	3.11	-0.29
Total valid votes		6,464	100.0	
Total rejected ballots		40	0.62	
Turnout		6,504	75.61	
Eligible voters		8,602		
Progressive Conservative gain from Liberal		Swing		+17.98

=== Municipal ===
Candidate	Votes	Incumbent
Jonathan A. Brennan (X)	323	
Kirby G. Curtis M	228	inc./sort.
Ryan L. McLaughlin	193	
Harold W. Moody	85	
Cindy Marie Ross (X)	316	inc./sort.
Jake Stewart (X)	252	
Cindy A. Sturgeon (X)	373	inc./sort.
Sharon M. Vickers	251	inc./sort.
