= Les Hull =

Canadian politician

MLA for York South
- In office 1974–1987
- Succeeded by: Al Lacey

Mayor of Fredericton, New Brunswick
- In office 2001-2004
- Preceded by: Sandy DiGiacinto
- Succeeded by: Brad Woodside

Personal details
- Born: December 21, 1935 (age 90) Springfield, New Brunswick
- Party: Progressive Conservative Party of New Brunswick
- Spouse: Eve Elizabeth Jackson (m. 1958)
- Occupation: Physical Education Instructor

Leslie Irvine Hull (born December 21, 1935) is a former Canadian politician. He served in the Legislative Assembly of New Brunswick from 1974 to 1987 as a Progressive Conservative member for the constituency of York South, and later served a term as mayor of Fredericton, New Brunswick from 2001 to 2004.

He was also a candidate for mayor of Fredericton in the October 1999 by-election following the resignation of Brad Woodside but lost to Sandy DiGiacinto by just 41 votes. He defeated DiGiacinto in the 2001 election.
