= Neguac =

- Village
- Nickname: "The Savoie Capital"
- Location of Neguac, New Brunswick
- Coordinates: 47.25529°N 65.07086°W
- Country: Canada
- Province: New Brunswick
- County: Northumberland County
- Founded: 1756
- Incorporated Village: August 23, 1967
- Electoral Districts Federal: Miramichi
- Provincial: Miramichi Bay-Neguac

Government
  - Mayor: Georges Rhéal Savoie
  - MLA: Réjean Savoie (PC)
  - MP: Jake Stewart (C)

Area
  - Land: 26.72 km^{2} (10.32 sq mi)
- Elevation: 0–40 m (0–131 ft)

Population (2021)
  - Total: 1,692
  - Density: 63.3/km^{2} (164/sq mi)
  - Change (2016–21): ▲0.5%
- Time zone: UTC-4 (Atlantic (AST))
  - Summer (DST): UTC-3 (ADT)
- Canadian Postal code: E9G
- Area code: 506
- Telephone Exchange: 776
- Website: Neguac.com

Neguac is a Canadian village in Northumberland County, New Brunswick.

== Geography ==
Situated on the north shore of Miramichi Bay at the southern end of the Acadian Peninsula, the village is located 44 kilometres northeast of Miramichi. Approximately 92 percent of its residents are francophone.

== History ==
Neguac calls itself the "Savoie Capital of Canada", as most Acadians with that surname trace their ancestry to the Neguac area. The first settlers in the village, Jean Savoie and his family, arrived in the area in 1757, two years after the Expulsion of the Acadians. In 2007, the community celebrated its 250th anniversary and 40th anniversary of incorporation.

== Economy ==
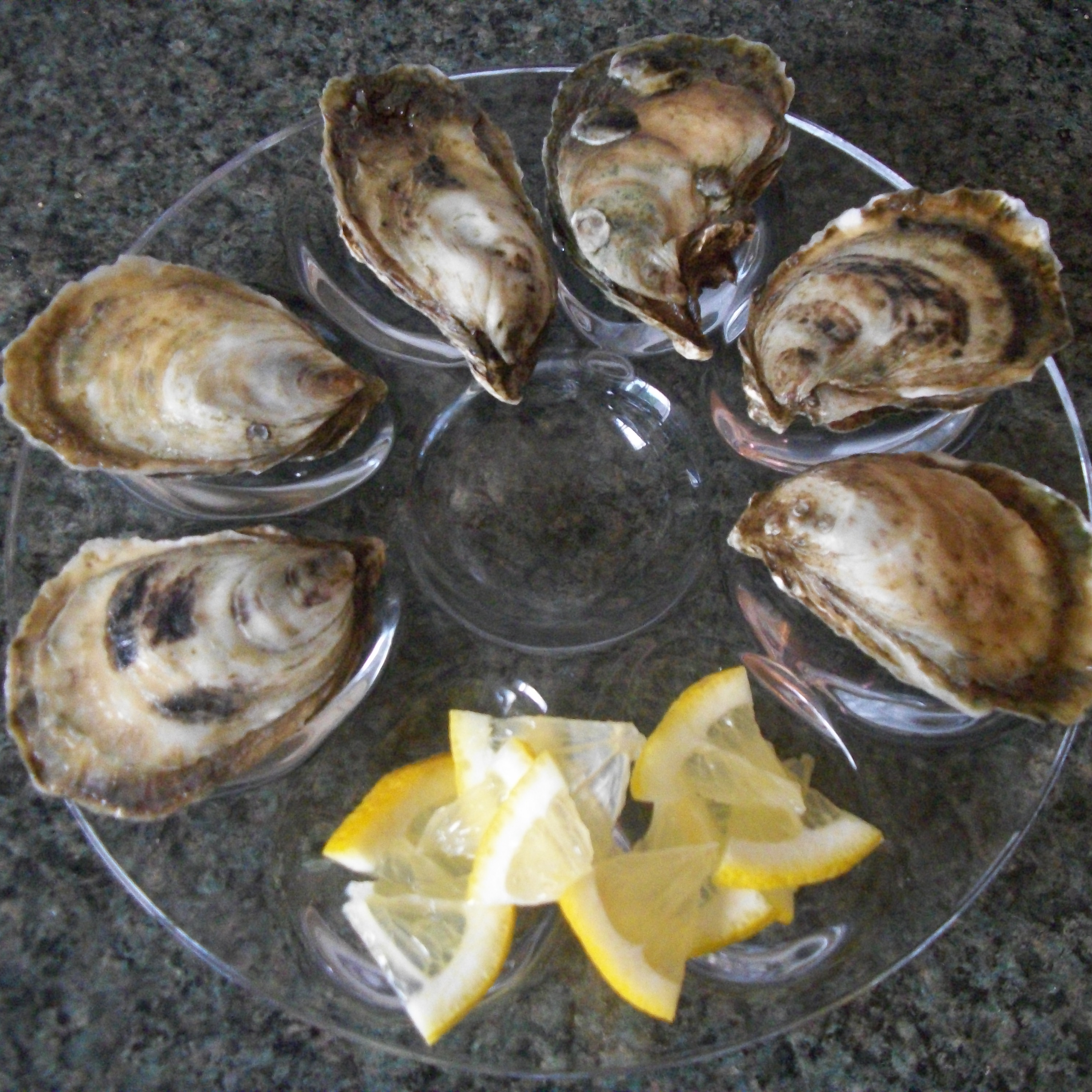
Beausoleil oysters, farm raised off the waters of Neguac, have become well known internationally.

The local economy is based on fishing and forestry, of which oyster farming and lobster fishing are the main industry. Seasonally, from August to mid-September blueberries are harvested, and from late October to early December Christmas wreaths are made and sold around Canada and the Continental United States, these industries play an important role in the local economy.

The community has two wharves situated in its municipal limits. It also has a large fish plant that processes lobster and herring.

Neguac is considered the Oyster Hub of Atlantic Canada. Its oysters are distributed throughout the world via the Maison Beausoleil Company.

In April 2003, a call centre was opened by Virtual-Agent Services (VAS). It employed nearly thirty call centre representatives. The call centre was closed August 26, 2011, when VAS was acquired by Thing5. The building now houses the Alnwick Resource Centre (Food Bank).

The community is a service centre of the Miramichi Bay area offering government services, a health clinic, restaurants, gas stations and other retail stores and services.

== Demographics ==
In the 2021 Census of Population conducted by Statistics Canada, Neguac had a population of 1,692 living in 721 of its 781 total private dwellings, a change of 0.5% from its 2016 population of 1,684. With a land area of 26.72 km^{2} (10.32 sq mi), it had a population density of 63.3/km^{2} (164.0/sq mi) in 2021.

Population trend

| Census | Population | Change (%) |
|---|---|---|
| 2016 | 1,684 | ▲0.4% |
| 2011 | 1,678 | ▲3.4% |
| 2006 | 1,623 | ▼4.4% |
| 2001 | 1,697 | ▼2.2% |
| 1996 | 1,735 | N/A |

Mother tongue (2016)

| Language | Population | Pct (%) |
|---|---|---|
| French only | 1,415 | 86.8% |
| English only | 170 | 10.4% |
| English and French | 30 | 1.8% |
| Other languages | 15 | 0.9% |

== See also ==
- List of communities in New Brunswick
