= Albert-Riverview =

Provincial electoral district in New Brunswick, Canada

New Brunswick electoral district
- The riding of Albert-Riverview (as it exists from 2023) in relation to other New Brunswick electoral districts
- Coordinates: 45.871°N 64.880°W

Provincial electoral district
- Legislature: Legislative Assembly of New Brunswick
MLA
Sherry Wilson
Progressive Conservative
- District created: 1973
- First contested: 1974
- Last contested: 2024

Demographics
- Population (2011): 15,702
- Electors (2013): 11,577

Albert-Riverview is a provincial electoral district for the Legislative Assembly of New Brunswick, Canada. It was created as Albert in 1973 when New Brunswick moved to single member districts and the former multi-member riding of Albert was split into this riding and the new riding of Riverview.

The boundaries were expanded slightly in the 1994 redistribution, taking in a small part of Riverview and again in 2006 when it took in another small part of the town of Riverview. In the 2013 redistribution it added more of Riverview again, as well as the village of Salisbury.

The riding was renamed to Albert-Riverview following the 2023 redistribution.

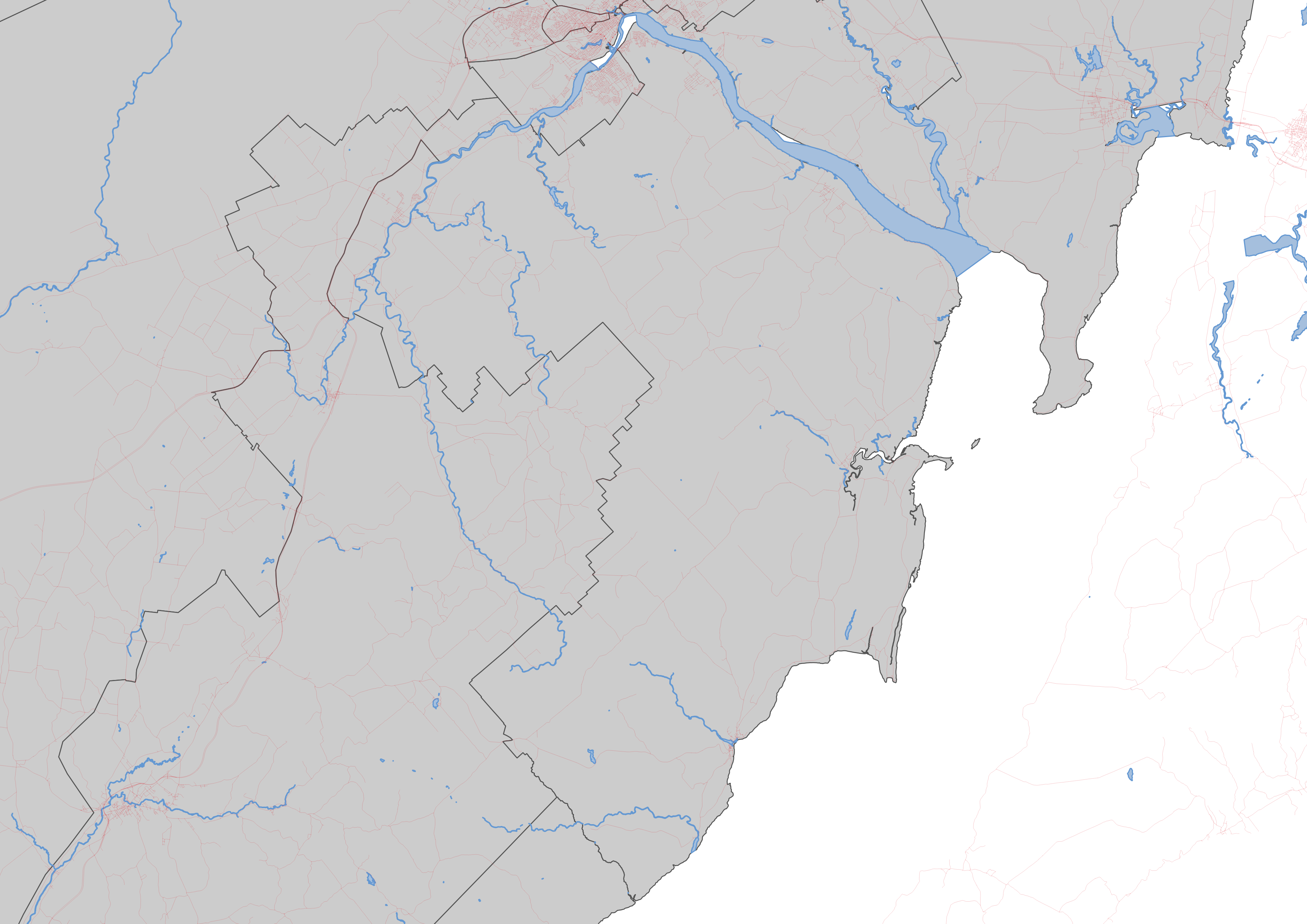
Albert-Riverview (as it exists from 2023) and the roads in the riding

== Members of the Legislative Assembly ==
Assembly	Years	Member	Party
Riding created from Albert (1846–1973)
48th	1974–1978	Malcolm MacLeod	Progressive Conservative
49th	1978–1982	Malcolm MacLeod	Progressive Conservative
50th	1982–1987	Malcolm MacLeod	Progressive Conservative
51st	1987–1991	Harold A. Terris	Liberal
52nd	1991–1994	Beverly Brine	Confederation of Regions
52nd	1994–1995	Beverly Brine	Independent
53rd	1995–1999	Harry Doyle	Liberal
54th	1999–2003	Wayne Steeves	Progressive Conservative
55th	2003–2006	Wayne Steeves	Progressive Conservative
56th	2006–2010	Wayne Steeves	Progressive Conservative
57th	2010–2014	Wayne Steeves	Progressive Conservative
58th	2014–2018	Brian Keirstead	Progressive Conservative
59th	2018–2020	Mike Holland	Progressive Conservative
60th	2020–2024	Mike Holland	Progressive Conservative
Albert-Riverview
61st	2024–Present	Sherry Wilson	Progressive Conservative

== Election results ==
2024 New Brunswick general election
Party	Candidate	Votes	%	±%
Progressive Conservative	Sherry Wilson	4,363	52.4%	-9.95
Liberal	Dave Gouthro	2,599	31.2%	+19.81
Green	Liam MacDougall	972	11.7%	-1.36
People's Alliance	Sharon Buchanan	297	3.6%	-8.49
Libertarian	William Jones	97	1.2%	
Total valid votes		8,328		
Total rejected ballots				
Turnout				
Eligible voters				
Source: Elections New Brunswick

2020 New Brunswick general election
Party	Candidate	Votes	%	±%
Progressive Conservative	Mike Holland	5,040	62.35	+19.56
Green	Jenny O'Neill	1,056	13.06	+2.36
People's Alliance	Sharon Buchanan	977	12.09	-6.93
Liberal	Kelly Nagle	921	11.39	-10.43
Independent	James Wilson	90	1.11	+0.04
Total valid votes		8,084		
Total rejected ballots		5	0.06	-0.13
Turnout		8,089	64.11	-0.45
Eligible voters		12,617		
Progressive Conservative hold		Swing		+8.60
Source: Elections New Brunswick

2018 New Brunswick general election
Party	Candidate	Votes	%	±%
Progressive Conservative	Mike Holland	3,479	42.78	+2.00
Liberal	Catherine Black	1,775	21.83	-6.41
People's Alliance	Sharon Buchanan	1,546	19.01	+11.35
Green	Moranda van Geest	870	10.70	-1.28
New Democratic	Betty Weir	375	4.61	-6.74
Independent	James Wilson	87	1.07	--
Total valid votes		8,132	100.0	
Total rejected ballots		16	0.20	
Turnout		8,148	64.56	
Eligible voters		12,620		
Source: Elections New Brunswick

2014 New Brunswick general election
Party	Candidate	Votes	%	±%
Progressive Conservative	Brian Keirstead	3,163	40.78	-21.50
Liberal	Terry A. Keating	2,190	28.24	+8.35
Green	Ira Wilbur	929	11.98	+4.98
New Democratic	Kelly-Sue O'Connor	880	11.35	+4.96
People's Alliance	Bill Brewer	594	7.66	+3.22
Total valid votes		7,756	100.0	
Total rejected ballots		32	0.41	
Turnout		7,788	63.21	
Eligible voters		12,320		
Progressive Conservative notional hold		Swing		-14.92
Source: Elections New Brunswick

2010 New Brunswick general election
Party	Candidate	Votes	%	±%
Progressive Conservative	Wayne Steeves	3,985	62.28	-7.72
Liberal	Claude Curwin	1,273	19.89	-10.11
Green	Vernon Woolsey	448	7.00	–
New Democratic	Anthony Crandall	409	6.39	–
People's Alliance	Lucy Rolfe	284	4.44	–
Total valid votes		6,399	100.0	
Total rejected ballots		34	0.53	
Turnout		6,433	67.46	
Eligible voters		9,536		
Progressive Conservative hold		Swing		+1.20
Source: Elections New Brunswick

2006 New Brunswick general election
Party	Candidate	Votes	%	±%
Progressive Conservative	Wayne Steeves	4,439	70.00	+16.40
Liberal	Clark Butland	1,902	30.00	-8.74
Total valid votes		6,341	100.0	
Progressive Conservative hold		Swing		+12.57
Source: Elections New Brunswick

2003 New Brunswick general election
Party	Candidate	Votes	%	±%
Progressive Conservative	Wayne Steeves	3,198	53.60	-3.32
Liberal	Clark Butland	2,311	38.74	+6.08
New Democratic	Pat Pearson	457	7.67	-0.62
Total valid votes		5,966		
Progressive Conservative hold		Swing		-4.70
Source: Elections New Brunswick

1999 New Brunswick general election
Party	Candidate	Votes	%	±%
Progressive Conservative	Wayne Steeves	3,633	56.92	+26.88
Liberal	Harry Doyle	2,085	32.66	-11.25
New Democratic	Myrna Geldart	529	8.29	+2.89
Confederation of Regions	Dean Ryder	136	2.13	-18.52
Total valid votes		6,383	100.0	
Progressive Conservative gain from Liberal		Swing		+19.06
Source: Elections New Brunswick

1995 New Brunswick general election
Party	Candidate	Votes	%	±%
Liberal	Harry Doyle	2,871	43.91	+18.69
Progressive Conservative	Wayne Steeves	1,964	30.04	+1.14
Confederation of Regions	Douglas Duff	1,350	20.65	-20.35
New Democratic	Elizabeth Venart	353	5.40	+0.52
Total valid votes		6,538		
Liberal gain from Confederation of Regions		Swing		+8.78
Source: Elections New Brunswick

1991 New Brunswick general election
Party	Candidate	Votes	%	±%
Confederation of Regions	Beverly Brine	2,328	41.00	–
Progressive Conservative	Wayne Steeves	1,641	28.90	-5.72
Liberal	H. LeRoy Martin	1,432	25.22	-25.59
New Democratic	Elizabeth Venart	277	4.88	-9.69
Total valid votes		5,678	100.0	
Confederation of Regions gain from Liberal		Swing		+23.36
Source: Elections New Brunswick

1987 New Brunswick general election
Party	Candidate	Votes	%	±%
Liberal	Harold A. Terris	2,668	50.81	+22.43
Progressive Conservative	Malcolm MacLeod	1,818	34.62	-24.37
New Democratic	Eugene R. Marshall	765	14.57	+1.94
Total valid votes		5,251	100.0	
Liberal gain from Progressive Conservative		Swing		+23.40
Source: Elections New Brunswick

1982 New Brunswick general election
Party	Candidate	Votes	%	±%
Progressive Conservative	Malcolm MacLeod	2,827	58.99	-2.95
Liberal	Gordon L. Rattray	1,360	28.38	-1.53
New Democratic	Gary Wayne Bannister	605	12.63	+4.48
Total valid votes		4,792	100.0	
Progressive Conservative hold		Swing		-0.71
Source: Elections New Brunswick

1978 New Brunswick general election
Party	Candidate	Votes	%	±%
Progressive Conservative	Malcolm MacLeod	2,669	61.94	+8.38
Liberal	Grant William Colpitts	1,289	29.91	-7.88
New Democratic	Robert J. Candy	351	8.15	+6.61
Total valid votes		4,309		
Progressive Conservative hold		Swing		+8.13
Source: Elections New Brunswick

1974 New Brunswick general election
Party	Candidate	Votes	%
Progressive Conservative	Malcolm MacLeod	2,106	53.56
Liberal	Frank R. Wilson	1,486	37.79
Independent	Albert J. Brown	284	7.79
New Democratic	Colin M. Leonard	56	1.54
Total valid votes		3,932	100.0
The previous multi-member riding of Albert voted totally Progressive Conservative in the last election, with Malcolm MacLeod being one of the two incumbents.
Source: Elections New Brunswick

== See also ==
- List of New Brunswick provincial electoral districts
- Canadian provincial electoral districts
