= Harry Doyle =

Canadian politician (born 1941)

Harry Doyle (born February 23, 1941) is an educator and former political figure in New Brunswick, Canada. He represented Albert in the Legislative Assembly of New Brunswick from 1995 to 1999 as a Liberal member.

He was born in Saint John, New Brunswick, the son of Cecil L. Doyle and Margaret J. Hatfield. He studied at Teacher's College and the University of Moncton. Doyle was a teacher and high school administrator. In 1966, he married Sandra Dobson. He was Minister of State for Youth and Literacy from 1998 to 1999. Doyle was defeated when he ran for reelection in 1999.

Legislative Assembly of New Brunswick
Preceded by Beverly Brine	MLA for Albert; 1995-1999	Succeeded by Wayne Steeves
