= Brian Keirstead =

Canadian politician

Brian Keirstead MLA

Member of the New Brunswick Legislative Assembly for Albert
- In office September 22, 2014 – 2018
- Preceded by: Wayne Steeves
- Succeeded by: Mike Holland

Personal details
- Party: Progressive Conservatives

Brian Keirstead is a Canadian politician, who was elected to the Legislative Assembly of New Brunswick in the 2014 provincial election. He represented the electoral district of Albert as a member of the Progressive Conservatives from 2014 to 2018.
