= Serge Robichaud =

Canadian politician

Member of the Legislative Assembly of New Brunswick
- In office September 27, 2010 – September 22, 2014
- Preceded by: Carmel Robichaud
- Succeeded by: Lisa Harris
- Constituency: Miramichi Bay-Neguac

Personal details
- Party: Progressive Conservative

Serge Robichaud is a Canadian politician, who was elected to the Legislative Assembly of New Brunswick in the 2010 provincial election. He represented the electoral district of Miramichi Bay-Neguac as a member of the Progressive Conservatives until the 2014 election, when he was defeated by Lisa Harris.
