= Malcolm MacLeod (politician) =

Canadian politician

Malcolm N. MacLeod

Member of the Legislative Assembly of New Brunswick
- In office 1970–1987
- Preceded by: Brenda Robertson
- Succeeded by: Harold A. Terris
- Constituency: Albert

Interim Leader of the Progressive Conservative Party of New Brunswick
- In office 1987–1989
- Preceded by: Richard Hatfield
- Succeeded by: Barbara Baird

Personal details
- Born: Malcolm Noble MacLeod; February 8, 1928 Moncton, New Brunswick, Canada
- Died: August 22, 1996 (aged 68) Moncton, New Brunswick, Canada
- Party: Progressive Conservative Party of New Brunswick
- Spouse: Hazel Edith Freeze (m. 1949)
- Children: 3

Malcolm Noble "Mac" MacLeod (February 8, 1928 – August 22, 1996) was a Canadian politician. Born in Moncton, New Brunswick, he served as a longtime member of the Legislative Assembly of New Brunswick representing the electoral district of Albert from 1970 to his defeat in 1987 when his Progressive Conservatives lost every seat in the legislature.

He was the second longest serving Minister of Agriculture in New Brunswick, serving as Minister of Agriculture and Rural Development from 1974 to 1985. He served as Minister of Natural Resources and Energy from 1985 until the defeat of his government in 1987. Following the election he served as interim leader of the PC Party until the election of Barbara Baird in 1989. He died in a Moncton nursing home in 1996 at the age of 68 from Parkinson's disease.
