= Southwest Miramichi-Bay du Vin =

Provincial electoral district in New Brunswick, Canada

New Brunswick electoral district
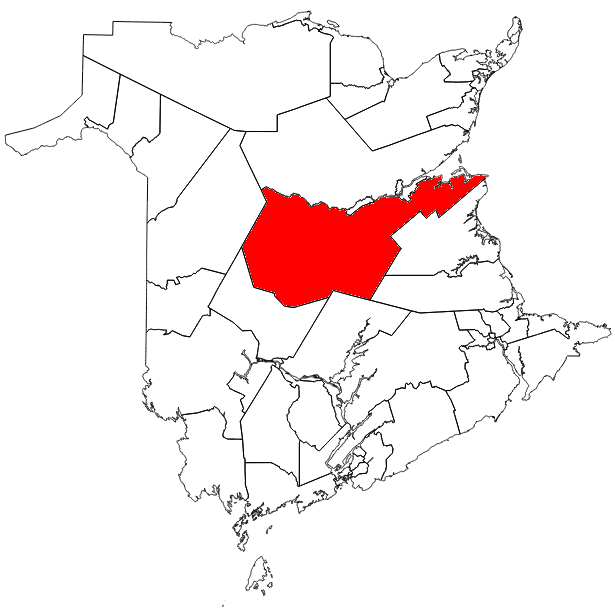
- The riding of Southwest Miramichi-Bay du Vin in relation to other New Brunswick electoral districts

Defunct provincial electoral district
- Legislature: Legislative Assembly of New Brunswick
- District created: 1973
- District abolished: 2023
- First contested: 1974
- Last contested: 2022

Demographics
- Population (2011): 14,379
- Electors (2013): 11,003
- Census division(s): Northumberland, York
- Census subdivision(s): Blackville (parish), Miramichi River Valley, Blissfield, Chatham, Derby, Doaktown, Glenelg, Hardwick, Nelson, Southesk, Stanley, Upper Miramichi

Southwest Miramichi-Bay du Vin (French: Miramichi-Sud-Ouest-Baie-du-Vin) was a provincial electoral district for the Legislative Assembly of New Brunswick, Canada. It was created as Southwest Miramichi in 1973, by which name it was known until 2014, and was largely unchanged in the 1994 and 2006 redistributions. In the 2013 redistribution, it moved eastward absorbing those parts of the former district of Miramichi-Bay du Vin which were outside the city of Miramichi.

== Members of the Legislative Assembly ==
Assembly	Years	Member	Party
Southwest Miramichi; Riding created from Northumberland
48th	1974–1978	Sterling Hambrook	Progressive Conservative
49th	1978–1982	Morris Green	Liberal
50th	1982–1987	Morris Green	Liberal
51st	1987–1991	Morris Green	Liberal
52nd	1991–1994	Brent Taylor	Confederation of Regions
52nd	1994–1995	Brent Taylor	Independent
53rd	1995–1999	Reg MacDonald	Liberal
54th	1999–2003	Norm Betts	Progressive Conservative
55th	2003–2006	Rick Brewer	Liberal
56th	2006–2010	Rick Brewer	Liberal
57th	2010–2014	Jake Stewart	Progressive Conservative
Southwest Miramichi-Bay du Vin
58th	2014–2018	Jake Stewart	Progressive Conservative
59th	2018–2020	Jake Stewart	Progressive Conservative
60th	2020–2021	Jake Stewart	Progressive Conservative
60th	2022–2024	Mike Dawson	Progressive Conservative
Riding dissolved into Miramichi West, Miramichi East, Kent North, Fredericton-York

== Election results ==
=== Southwest Miramichi-Bay du Vin ===
New Brunswick provincial by-election, June 20, 2022 Resignation of Jake Stewart
Party	Candidate	Votes	%	±%
Progressive Conservative	Mike Dawson	2,542	52.25	+4.28
Liberal	Hannah Fulton Johnston	1,737	35.70	+13.98
People's Alliance	Larry Lynch	363	7.46	-20.53
Green	Julie Guillemet-Ackerman	223	4.58	
Total valid votes		4,865	99.71	
Total rejected ballots		14	0.29	+0.04
Turnout		4,879	43.57	-28.30
Eligible voters		11,199		
Progressive Conservative hold		Swing		-4.85
Source: Elections New Brunswick

2020 New Brunswick general election
Party	Candidate	Votes	%	±%
Progressive Conservative	Jake Stewart	3,887	47.97	+12.55
People's Alliance	Art O'Donnell	2,268	27.99	-7.01
Liberal	Josh McCormack	1,760	21.72	-1.12
New Democratic	Glenna Hanley	188	2.32	+1.16
Total valid votes		8,103	99.75	
Total rejected ballots		20	0.25	-0.04
Turnout		8,123	71.87	-2.28
Eligible voters		11,303		
Progressive Conservative hold		Swing		+9.78
Source: Elections New Brunswick

2018 New Brunswick general election
Party	Candidate	Votes	%	±%
Progressive Conservative	Jake Stewart	2,960	35.42	-12.20
People's Alliance	Art O'Donnell	2,925	35.00	+26.39
Liberal	Andy Hardy	1,909	22.84	-13.78
Green	Byron J. Connors	447	5.35	+2.69
New Democratic	Roger Vautour	97	1.16	-3.32
KISS	Dawson Brideau	19	0.23	--
Total valid votes		8,357	99.71	
Total rejected ballots		24	0.29	-0.06
Turnout		8,381	74.15	+3.92
Eligible voters		11,303		
Progressive Conservative hold		Swing		-19.30

2014 New Brunswick general election
Party	Candidate	Votes	%	±%
Progressive Conservative	Jake Stewart	3,837	47.62	-10.95
Liberal	Norma Smith	2,951	36.63	+6.44
People's Alliance	Wes Gullison	694	8.61	+3.62
New Democratic	Douglas Mullin	361	4.48	+1.37
Green	Kevin W. Matthews	214	2.66	-0.48
Total valid votes		8,057	99.65	
Total rejected ballots		28	0.35	-0.27
Turnout		8,085	70.23	-5.38
Eligible voters		11,512		
Progressive Conservative notional hold		Swing		-8.70

=== Southwest Miramichi ===
2010 New Brunswick general election
Party	Candidate	Votes	%	±%
Progressive Conservative	Jake Stewart	3,786	58.57	+14.05
Liberal	Rick Brewer	1,951	30.18	-21.90
People's Alliance	Wes Gullison	323	5.00	–
Green	Jimmy D. Lawlor	203	3.14	–
New Democratic	Jason Robar	201	3.11	-0.29
Total valid votes		6,464	99.38	
Total rejected ballots		40	0.62	-0.01
Turnout		6,504	75.61	+3.93
Eligible voters		8,602		
Progressive Conservative gain from Liberal		Swing		+17.97

2006 New Brunswick general election
Party	Candidate	Votes	%	±%
Liberal	Rick Brewer	3,327	52.08	+0.25
Progressive Conservative	Brent Taylor	2,844	44.52	+1.42
New Democratic	Lydia Calhoun	217	3.40	-1.67
Total valid votes		6,388	99.38	
Total rejected ballots		40	0.62	-0.38
Turnout		6,428	71.68	-6.11
Eligible voters		8,968		
Liberal notional hold		Swing		-0.59

2003 New Brunswick general election
Party	Candidate	Votes	%	±%
Liberal	Rick Brewer	3,395	51.83	+11.82
Progressive Conservative	Norm Betts	2,823	43.10	-13.32
New Democratic	Chris Ashford	332	5.07	+1.50
Total valid votes		6,550	99.00	
Total rejected ballots		66	1.00	+0.63
Turnout		6,616	77.79	-3.84
Eligible voters		8,505		
Liberal gain from Progressive Conservative		Swing		+12.57

1999 New Brunswick general election
Party	Candidate	Votes	%	±%
Progressive Conservative	Norm Betts	4,019	56.42	+23.63
Liberal	Reg MacDonald	2,850	40.01	-5.49
New Democratic	Terry Carter	254	3.57	-1.19
Total valid votes		7,123	99.64	
Total rejected ballots		26	0.36	-0.32
Turnout		7,149	81.63	-0.01
Eligible voters		8,758		
Progressive Conservative gain from Liberal		Swing		+14.56

1995 New Brunswick general election
Party	Candidate	Votes	%	±%
Liberal	Reg MacDonald	3,227	45.50	+3.40
Progressive Conservative	Andy Dawson	2,326	32.80	+22.25
Confederation of Regions	Gerald Stewart	1,055	14.88	-29.57
New Democratic	Allan Goodfellow	337	4.75	+1.85
Independent	G. D. Holmes	147	2.07	–
Total valid votes		7,092	99.31	
Total rejected ballots		49	0.69	+0.18
Turnout		7,141	81.64	-6.24
Eligible voters		8,747		
Liberal gain from Confederation of Regions		Swing		-16.49

1991 New Brunswick general election
Party	Candidate	Votes	%	±%
Confederation of Regions	Brent Taylor	2,954	44.45	–
Liberal	Claude Stewart	2,798	42.10	-31.93
Progressive Conservative	Donald Long	701	10.55	-11.46
New Democratic	Larry Lynch	193	2.90	+0.05
Total valid votes		6,646	99.49	
Total rejected ballots		34	0.51	+0.08
Turnout		6,680	87.88	+1.76
Eligible voters		7,601		
Confederation of Regions gain from Liberal		Swing		+38.19

1987 New Brunswick general election
Party	Candidate	Votes	%	±%
Liberal	Morris Green	4,676	74.03	+20.24
Progressive Conservative	Kevin Price	1,390	22.01	-17.07
New Democratic	Patrick Kelly	180	2.85	-1.22
Independent	Burton Joseph Kehoe	70	1.11	–
Total valid votes		6,316	99.57	
Total rejected ballots		27	0.43	-0.32
Turnout		6,343	86.12	-0.72
Eligible voters		7,365		
Liberal hold		Swing		+18.66

1982 New Brunswick general election
Party	Candidate	Votes	%	±%
Liberal	Morris Green	3,225	53.79	+2.41
Progressive Conservative	Sterling Hambrook	2,343	39.08	-9.53
New Democratic	John Barry	244	4.07	–
Independent	Floyd Wilson	183	3.05	–
Total valid votes		5,995	99.25	
Total rejected ballots		45	0.75	-1.05
Turnout		6,040	86.84	+4.76
Eligible voters		6,955		
Liberal hold		Swing		+5.97

1978 New Brunswick general election
Party	Candidate	Votes	%	±%
Liberal	Morris Green	2,725	51.39	+8.46
Progressive Conservative	John Munn	2,578	48.61	-0.77
Total valid votes		5,303	98.20	
Total rejected ballots		97	1.80	+0.98
Turnout		5,400	82.08	+1.39
Eligible voters		6,579		
Liberal gain from Progressive Conservative		Swing		+4.62

1974 New Brunswick general election
Party	Candidate	Votes	%
Progressive Conservative	Sterling Hambrook	2,454	49.39
Liberal	Roland "Doad" Walls	2,133	42.93
New Democratic	Floyd Wilson	382	7.69
Total valid votes		4,969	99.18
Total rejected ballots		41	0.82
Turnout		5,010	80.69
Eligible voters		6,209	
The previous multi-member riding of Northumberland went totally Liberal in the last election. None of the five incumbents ran in this riding.
