= Sterling Hambrook =

Canadian politician

MLA for Southwest Miramichi
- In office 1974–1978
- Succeeded by: Morris Vernon Green

Personal details
- Born: January 20, 1935 Newcastle, New Brunswick
- Died: July 8, 2017 (Age 82) Miramichi, New Brunswick
- Party: Progressive Conservative Party of New Brunswick
- Spouse: Melva Hambrook (Coughlan)
- Children: Janice Sullivan, Paul Hambrook, Constance Hambrook

Sterling Wilson Hambrook (January 20, 1935 – July 8, 2017) was a Canadian politician. He served in the Legislative Assembly of New Brunswick from 1974 to 1978, as a Progressive Conservative Party of New Brunswick member for the constituency of Southwest Miramichi.
