= Wayne Steeves =

Canadian politician (1944–2026)

O. Wayne Steeves (December 12, 1944 – October 12, 2026) was a Canadian politician in the province of New Brunswick.

== Life and career ==
Steeves was born in Lower Coverdale, New Brunswick on December 12, 1944, the son of Noel Steeves and Vera Downing. A Progressive Conservative, he has been a candidate for the Legislative Assembly of New Brunswick for the electoral district of Albert in every election since 1991. Defeated in 1991 and 1995, Steeves was finally elected in 1999.

He was re-elected in 2003 and joined the cabinet as minister of public safety. He was again re-elected in 2006 but left the cabinet as his party formed the opposition.

Steeves retained the seat until the 2014 New Brunswick general election, when he did not run for re-election and was succeeded by Brian Keirstead.

Steeves died on October 12, 2026, at the age of 81.

== Sources ==
- MLA Bios, Government of New Brunswick

New Brunswick provincial government of Bernard Lord
Cabinet post (1)
| Predecessor | Office | Successor |
|---|---|---|
| Margaret-Ann Blaney | Minister of Public Safety; 2003-2006 | John Foran |
Legislative Assembly of New Brunswick
| Preceded by Harry Doyle | MLA for Albert; 1999-2014 | Brian Keirstead |
