= Sam Johnston (New Brunswick politician) =

Canadian politician from New Brunswick

Member of the New Brunswick Legislative Assembly for Miramichi Bay-Neguac
- Incumbent
- Assumed office October 21, 2024
- Preceded by: Réjean Savoie

Personal details
- Party: Liberal
- Education: University of New Brunswick

Sam Johnston is a Canadian politician and martial artist, who was elected to the Legislative Assembly of New Brunswick in the 2024 election. He was elected in the riding of Miramichi Bay-Neguac, unseating Progressive Conservative member Réjean Savoie.

Prior to his election, he served on Miramichi City Council. He is also a taekwondo practitioner and holds an 8th-degree black belt rank.

== Education and personal life ==
Johnston is a graduate of the University of New Brunswick, where he earned a Bachelor of Arts, a Bachelor of Education, and a Master of Education.

Johnston was previously diagnosed with Acute myeloid leukemia. He underwent a stem cell transplant and returned to practicing taekwondo after his recovery. In 2017, he won a gold medal in the Senior Master Integration Division at the World Taekwondo Hanmadang held in South Korea. He is one of the 2026 inductees of the New Brunswick Sports Hall of Fame.

== Electoral record ==
2024 New Brunswick general election: Miramichi Bay-Neguac
Party	Candidate	Votes	%	±%
Liberal	Sam Johnston	4,219	52.24	+9.4
Progressive Conservative	Réjean Savoie	3,146	38.95	+12.3
Green	Wayne Hitchcock	711	8.80	-0.7
Total valid votes		8,076	99.72	
Total rejected ballots		23	0.28	
Turnout		8,099	64.76	
Eligible voters		12,507		
Liberal gain from Progressive Conservative		Swing		-1.4
Source: Elections New Brunswick
