= York South (New Brunswick provincial electoral district) =

Defunct provincial electoral district in New Brunswick, Canada

New Brunswick electoral district

Defunct provincial electoral district
- Legislature: Legislative Assembly of New Brunswick
- District created: 1973
- District abolished: 1994
- First contested: 1974
- Last contested: 1991

York South was a provincial electoral district for the Legislative Assembly of New Brunswick, Canada. It was formed in 1974 when the former multi-member electoral district of York County was split into York North and York South. In the electoral redistribution of 1994, York South ceased to exist when it was divided between the new electoral districts of York and New Maryland and the existing districts of Fredericton South and Woodstock.

== Members of the Legislative Assembly ==
Assembly	Years	Member	Party
Riding created from York (1785–1974)
48th	1974–1978	Les Hull	Progressive Conservative
49th	1978–1982	Les Hull	Progressive Conservative
50th	1982–1987	Les Hull	Progressive Conservative
51st	1987–1991	Al Lacey	Liberal
52nd	1991–1995	Danny Cameron	Confederation of Regions
Riding dissolved into York (1995–2014), New Maryland; Fredericton South and Woodstock

== Election results ==
1991 New Brunswick general election
Party	Candidate	Votes	%	±%
Confederation of Regions	Danny Cameron	5,607	43.94	–
Liberal	Al Lacey	4,754	37.26	-22.75
Progressive Conservative	Marven Grant	1,797	14.08	-16.25
New Democratic	Rita Hurley	602	4.72	-4.00
Total valid votes		12,760	100.0	
Confederation of Regions gain from Liberal		Swing		+33.34

1987 New Brunswick general election
Party	Candidate	Votes	%	±%
Liberal	Al Lacey	6,894	60.01	+20.23
Progressive Conservative	Les Hull	3,485	30.33	-23.17
New Democratic	Gary Hughes	1,002	8.72	+2.00
Independent	H. Robert A. Storr	108	0.94	–
Total valid votes		11,489	100.0	
Liberal gain from Progressive Conservative		Swing		+21.70

1982 New Brunswick general election
Party	Candidate	Votes	%	±%
Progressive Conservative	Les Hull	5,289	53.50	-2.56
Liberal	Ralph Annis	3,933	39.78	+1.45
New Democratic	Dan Weston	664	6.72	+1.11
Total valid votes		9,886	100.0	
Progressive Conservative hold		Swing		-2.00

1978 New Brunswick general election
Party	Candidate	Votes	%	±%
Progressive Conservative	Leslie "Les" Hull	4,440	56.06	-0.57
Liberal	Blaine E. Hatt	3,036	38.33	-2.17
New Democratic	Mark Allen Canning	444	5.61	+2.75
Total valid votes		7,920	100.0	
Progressive Conservative hold		Swing		+0.80

1974 New Brunswick general election
Party	Candidate	Votes	%
Progressive Conservative	Leslie I. Hull	3,796	56.63
Liberal	Bob Strange	2,715	40.50
New Democratic	J.S. "Jenny" Munday	192	2.86
Total valid votes		6,703	100.0
The previous multi-member riding of York went totally Progressive Conservative in the previous election. Neither of the two incumbents ran in this riding.

== See also ==
- List of New Brunswick provincial electoral districts
- Canadian provincial electoral districts
