= Ab Rector =

Canadian politician

Member of the New Brunswick Legislative Assembly for Oromocto
- In office September 23, 1991 – September 11, 1995
- Preceded by: Tom Gilbert
- Succeeded by: Vaughn Blaney

Personal details
- Born: June 23, 1934 Springhill, Nova Scotia
- Died: March 30, 2005 (aged 70) Oromocto, New Brunswick
- Party: New Brunswick Confederation of Regions Party

Albert Morris Rector (June 23, 1934 – March 30, 2005) was a Canadian politician. He served in the Legislative Assembly of New Brunswick from 1991 to 1995, as a Confederation of Regions Party member for the constituency of Oromocto.
