= Danny Cameron (politician) =

Canadian politician

Leader of the Opposition of New Brunswick
- In office 23 September 1991 – 1995
- Preceded by: Camille Thériault
- Succeeded by: Ab Rector

Leader of the New Brunswick Confederation of Regions Party
- In office 1992–1995
- Preceded by: Brent Taylor
- Succeeded by: Ab Rector

Member of the Legislative Assembly of New Brunswick
- In office 23 September 1991 – 11 September 1995
- Preceded by: Al Lacey
- Succeeded by: Riding merged
- Constituency: York South

Personal details
- Born: Daniel Ernest Cameron; 1924 Osgoode, Ontario
- Died: 12 April 2009 (aged 85) Fredericton, New Brunswick
- Party: Confederation of Regions

Daniel Ernest Cameron (1924 – 12 April 2009) was the Leader of the Opposition in the Legislative Assembly of New Brunswick, Canada, from 1991 to 1995, as leader of the New Brunswick Confederation of Regions Party, a conservative political party.

== Career ==
Cameron was born in 1924 at Osgoode, Ontario, the son of James W. Cameron and Euphemia Madden. Cameron represented the riding of York South. He had previously assisted the former Progressive Conservative Member of Parliament as his chief of staff for many years. Cameron served in the Royal Canadian Air Force during World War II.

He was viewed by many of the more hardline CoR members as being too soft on the issues. The party's machine (President, Executive, Council) tried to overthrow him, but their attempts failed, and although they and the membership elected Brent Taylor as leader, Cameron was able to successfully argue that leadership convention was illegal. After a conflict with the former leader of the party Arch Pafford, Cameron had Pafford expelled from the party, along with those in the party machine who had opposed him. When he stepped down as leader, he was replaced with a candidate that was widely seen as part of the "Anti-Cameron" camp.

Cameron did not run again in the 1995 election. He died aged 85 at Fredericton's Everett Chalmers Hospital.

Vacant Title last held by Frank McKenna	Leader of the Opposition in the Legislative Assembly of New Brunswick; 1991–1995	Succeeded by Bernard Valcourt
