= New Maryland-Sunbury =

Provincial electoral district in New Brunswick, Canada

New Brunswick electoral district
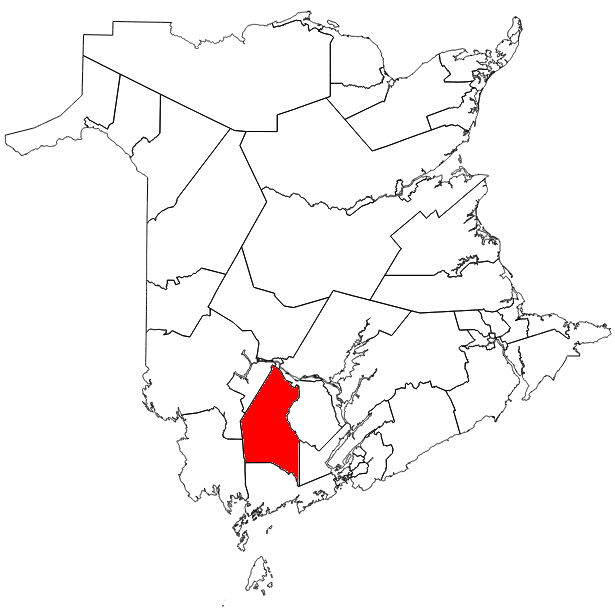
- The riding of New Maryland-Sunbury in relation to other New Brunswick electoral districts
- Coordinates: 45.653°N 66.729°W

Defunct provincial electoral district
- Legislature: Legislative Assembly of New Brunswick
- District created: 1994
- District abolished: 2023
- First contested: 1995
- Last contested: 2020

Demographics
- Population (2011): 16,691
- Electors (2013): 11,313
- Census division(s): Sunbury, York

New Maryland-Sunbury was a provincial electoral district for the Legislative Assembly of New Brunswick, Canada.

== History ==
It was created in 1994 as a totally new district taking in large parts of York South and Sunbury as well as small pieces of several other districts. In the 2006 redistribution of districts, it lost the community of Lincoln due to the rapid growth of both Lincoln and the village of New Maryland, both bedroom communities for Fredericton.

Also in 2006, the legislature decided to change the name from New Maryland to New Maryland-Sunbury West to reflect that the district contains much more than just the community of New Maryland.

The district expanded eastward in 2013 to take in most of southern Sunbury County, including the Geary area. It was accordingly renamed New Maryland-Sunbury

== Members of the Legislative Assembly ==
Assembly	Years	Member	Party
New Maryland
Riding created from Sunbury, York South, Queens South and Charlotte-Fundy
53rd	1995–1999	Joan Kingston	Liberal
54th	1999–2003	Keith Ashfield	Progressive Conservative
55th	2003–2006	Keith Ashfield	Progressive Conservative
New Maryland-Sunbury West
56th	2006–2008	Keith Ashfield	Progressive Conservative
56th	2008–2010	Jack Carr	Progressive Conservative
57th	2010–2014	Jack Carr	Progressive Conservative
New Maryland-Sunbury
58th	2014–2018	Jeff Carr	Progressive Conservative
59th	2018–2020	Jeff Carr	Progressive Conservative
60th	2020–2024	Jeff Carr	Progressive Conservative
Riding dissolved into Hanwell-New Maryland, Fredericton-Lincoln, Oromocto-Sunbury, Fundy-The Isles-Saint John Lorneville, Saint Croix and Carleton-York

== Election results ==
=== New Maryland-Sunbury ===
2020 New Brunswick general election
Party	Candidate	Votes	%	±%
Progressive Conservative	Jeff Carr	5,342	57.76	+16.55
Green	Jen Smith	1,463	15.82	+6.15
People's Alliance	Morris Shannon	1,254	13.56	-10.17
Liberal	Chris Pelkey	1,048	11.33	-12.36
New Democratic	Chris Thompson	141	1.52	-0.01
Total valid votes		9,248	99.63	
Total rejected ballots		34	0.37	
Turnout		9,282	69.50	
Eligible voters		13,356		
Progressive Conservative hold		Swing		+5.20

2018 New Brunswick general election
Party	Candidate	Votes	%	±%
Progressive Conservative	Jeff Carr	3,844	41.21	+0.26
People's Alliance	Morris Shannon	2,214	23.73	--
Liberal	Alex Scholten	2,210	23.69	-7.65
Green	Jenica Atwin	902	9.67	+3.54
New Democratic	Mackenzie Thomason	143	1.53	-20.05
KISS	Danelle Titus	14	0.15	--
Total valid votes		9,327	100.0	
Total rejected ballots		12		
Turnout		9,339	72.60	
Eligible voters		12,864		

2014 New Brunswick general election
Party	Candidate	Votes	%	±%
Progressive Conservative	Jeff Carr	3,391	40.95	-22.65
Liberal	Michael Pearson	2,595	31.34	+7.94
New Democratic	Aimée Foreman	1,787	21.58	+13.06
Green	Kelsey Adams	508	6.13	+1.65
Total valid votes		8,281	100.0	
Total rejected ballots		25	0.30	
Turnout		8,306	67.09	
Eligible voters		12,380		
Progressive Conservative notional hold		Swing		-15.30

=== New Maryland-Sunbury West ===
2010 New Brunswick general election
Party	Candidate	Votes	%	±%
Progressive Conservative	Jack Carr	4,099	63.60	+12.51
Liberal	Larry DeLong	1,508	23.40	-22.40
New Democratic	Jesse Travis	549	8.52	+5.41
Green	Ellen Comer	289	4.48	–
Total valid votes		6,445	100.0	
Total rejected ballots		29	0.45	
Turnout		6,474	72.25	
Eligible voters		8,960		
Progressive Conservative hold		Swing		+17.46

New Brunswick provincial by-election, 2008
Party	Candidate	Votes	%	±%
Progressive Conservative	Jack Carr	2,494	51.09	-0.93
Liberal	Debbie McCann	2,236	45.80	+2.78
New Democratic	Michael McCaffrey	152	3.11	-1.85
Total valid votes		4,882	100.0	
Progressive Conservative hold		Swing		-1.86

2006 New Brunswick general election
Party	Candidate	Votes	%	±%
Progressive Conservative	Keith Ashfield	3,209	52.02	+6.35
Liberal	Les Smith	2,654	43.02	+0.02
New Democratic	Brecken Rose Hancock	306	4.96	-6.37
Total valid votes		6,169	100.0	
Progressive Conservative notional hold		Swing		+3.16

=== New Maryland ===
2003 New Brunswick general election
Party	Candidate	Votes	%	±%
Progressive Conservative	Keith Ashfield	3,719	45.67	-7.63
Liberal	Joan Kingston	3,502	43.00	+4.16
New Democratic	Kay Nandlall	923	11.33	+5.76
Total valid votes		8,144	100.0	
Progressive Conservative hold		Swing		-5.90

1999 New Brunswick general election
Party	Candidate	Votes	%	±%
Progressive Conservative	Keith Ashfield	4,223	53.30	+31.28
Liberal	Joan Kingston	3,077	38.84	-7.72
New Democratic	Carol E. Moore	441	5.57	-2.39
Confederation of Regions	George Rennick	182	2.30	-21.15
Total valid votes		7,923	100.0	
Progressive Conservative gain from Liberal		Swing		+19.50

1995 New Brunswick general election
Party	Candidate	Votes	%	±%
Liberal	Joan Kingston	3,719	46.56	
Confederation of Regions	Max White	1,873	23.45	
Progressive Conservative	Robert Penney	1,759	22.02	
New Democratic	Eric Keating	636	7.96	
Total valid votes		7,987	100.0	
Liberal notional gain from Confederation of Regions		Swing		

* This was a new riding created largely out of the former ridings of York South and Sunbury, both of which were held by CoR prior to the election. White was the incumbent from Sunbury.
