= Reginald W. Mabey =

Canadian politician (1932–2000)

Reg Mabey

Member of the Legislative Assembly of New Brunswick
- In office 1970–1974
- Constituency: Sunbury

Personal details
- Born: December 19, 1932 Saint John, New Brunswick, Canada
- Died: March 26, 2000 (aged 67) Naples, Florida, U.S.
- Party: Progressive Conservative Party of New Brunswick
- Spouse: Barbara Ann Watson (m. 1950)
- Occupation: businessman

Reginald William "Reg" Mabey (December 19, 1932 – March 26, 2000) was a businessman and political figure in New Brunswick, Canada. He represented Sunbury County in the Legislative Assembly of New Brunswick from 1970 to 1974 as a Progressive Conservative member.

He was born in Saint John, New Brunswick, the son of Frank Burling Mabey and Florence A. Searle. He was educated at the University of New Brunswick. In 1950, Mabey married Barbara Ann Watson. He served in the Canadian Armed Forces from 1954 to 1970. Mabey also served on the local school board and was a member of the town council for Oromocto. He died in Florida in 2000.
