= Réjean Savoie =

Canadian politician and businessman

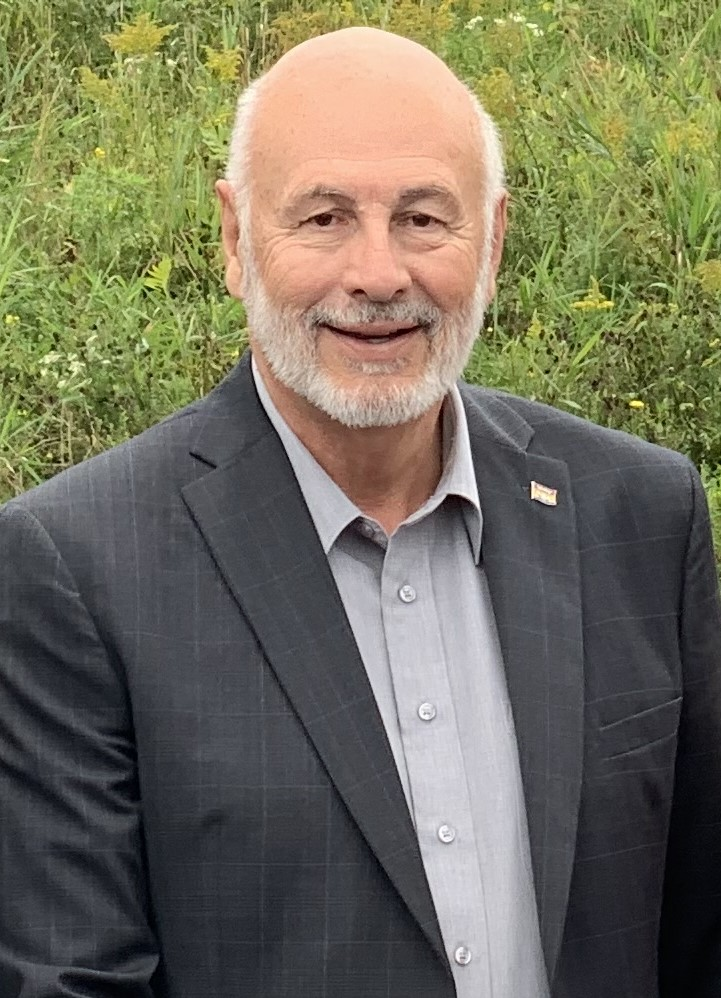
- Savoie in 2023

Minister responsible for the Regional Development Corporation
- In office October 13, 2022 – November 2, 2024
- Succeeded by: Gary Crossman

Member of the New Brunswick Legislative Assembly for Miramichi Bay
- In office June 7, 1999 – June 9, 2003
- Preceded by: Danny Gay
- Succeeded by: Carmel Robichaud

Member of the New Brunswick Legislative Assembly for Miramichi Bay-Neguac
- In office June 20, 2022 – September 19, 2024
- Preceded by: Lisa Harris
- Succeeded by: Sam Johnston

Personal details
- Party: Progressive Conservative

Réjean Savoie (born September 15, 1952) is a businessman and political figure in New Brunswick. He was a member of the Legislative Assembly of New Brunswick from 1999 to 2003 and again from 2022 to 2024. He was most recently elected the Progressive Conservative Party MLA for Miramichi Bay-Neguac in 2022 in a by-election to replace Lisa Harris, having previously represented Miramichi Bay from 1999 to 2003.

He was born in Saint-Wilfred, New Brunswick, the son of Levi Savoie and Exéline Roy. Savoie studied at the Bathurst Technical School and the New Brunswick Community College. He worked as a tractor trailer operator and also owned and operated a restaurant and service station. Savoie served as a member of the school board and as a member of the board of directors for the Neguac Medical Clinic and the l’Hotel-Dieu Hospital in Chatham.

He returned to office after winning the June 2022 by-election in Miramichi Bay-Neguac.

He was unseated in the 2024 New Brunswick general election by Liberal Sam Johnston.

== Electoral history ==
2024 New Brunswick general election: Miramichi Bay-Neguac
Party	Candidate	Votes	%	±%
Liberal	Sam Johnston	4,219	52.24	+9.4
Progressive Conservative	Réjean Savoie	3,146	38.95	+12.3
Green	Wayne Hitchcock	711	8.80	-0.7
Total valid votes		8,076	99.72	
Total rejected ballots		23	0.28	
Turnout		8,099	64.76	
Eligible voters		12,507		
Liberal gain from Progressive Conservative		Swing		-1.4
Source: Elections New Brunswick

New Brunswick provincial by-election, June 20, 2022: Miramichi Bay-Neguac Resignation of Lisa Harris
Party	Candidate	Votes	%	±%
Progressive Conservative	Réjean Savoie	2,286	44.98	+11.33
Liberal	Shawn Wood	1,753	34.49	-9.07
Green	Chad Duplessie	772	15.19	+5.10
People's Alliance	Thomas L'Huillier	172	3.38	-7.60
Independent	Hoss Sutherland	99	1.95	–
Total valid votes		5,082	99.82	
Total rejected ballots		9	0.18	-0.09
Turnout		5,091	42.08	-25.57
Eligible voters		12,098		
Progressive Conservative gain from Liberal		Swing		+10.20
Source: Elections New Brunswick
