= Joseph Mombourquette =

Canadian politician

Joseph William Mombourquette (September 9, 1922 – November 27, 2007) was a member of the Canadian Armed Forces and political figure in New Brunswick. He represented Oromocto in the Legislative Assembly of New Brunswick from 1982 to 1987.

== Biography ==
He was born in Lower L'Ardoise, Cape Breton Island, Nova Scotia, the son of Anthony Mombourquette and Clara Sampson. He was a member of the Canadian Army for 32 years, serving during World War II and the Korean War. He received a B.A. from Saint Francis Xavier University in 1952. Later that year, Mombourquette married Theresa Marion Clannon. He retired from the army in 1973 at the rank of captain and went on to work in Manpower offices in New Brunswick. He was a member of the province's Executive Council as Minister of Labour and Human Resources and then Minister of Labour. After he retired from politics, Mombourquette served with the Canadian Employment and Immigration Commission for ten years.
