= Official multilingualism =

State recognition of multiple languages

Official multilingualism is the policy adopted by some states of recognizing multiple languages as official and producing all official documents, and handling all correspondence and official dealings, including court procedure, in these languages. It is distinct from personal multilingualism, the capacity of a person to speak several languages.

== States with policies of official bilingualism ==
=== Afghanistan ===
Afghanistan uses Dari (or Afghan Persian) and Pashto as official languages. Many citizens are bilingual. These two languages account for 85% of Afghanis' native tongues.

=== Belarus ===
In Belarus, Russian is far more common than Belarusian, and Section 17 of the Constitution designates both as official languages.

=== Brunei Darussalam ===
Brunei Darussalam is extremely diverse linguistically and uses Malay and English as official languages.

=== Burundi ===
The official languages of Burundi are the local Kirundi language as well as the colonial French.

=== Cameroon ===
Cameroon is extremely diverse linguistically and uses English and French as official languages.

=== Canada ===
In Canada, English and French have special legal status over other languages in Canada's courts, parliament and administration. At the provincial level, New Brunswick is the only official bilingual province, while Quebec is the only province where French is the sole official language, and the only officially monolingual province. The remaining provinces are predominantly English-speaking, but do not officially recognize English as the only official language. In practice, all provinces, including Quebec, offer some services in both official languages, including education (elementary and secondary in every province, and most provinces have at least one postsecondary institution or unit teaching in its minority language). English and French are official languages in all three territories (because they are federally administered). In addition, Inuktitut is also an official language in Nunavut, and nine aboriginal languages have official status in the Northwest Territories.

=== Central African Republic ===
Out of 120 languages spoken in the Central African Republic, French and the Ngbandi-based creole Sango are official.

=== Chad ===
Citizens of Chad speak over 120 languages, and the standardized Chadian Arabic serves as the lingua franca with colonial language French also being official.

=== Cyprus ===
The island nation of Cyprus has had Greek and Turkish as its languages since the 1960 Constitution (Article 3, section 1). The usage of either language is complicated by the political dispute that lead to the creation of the Turkish Republic of Northern Cyprus. English is also used.

=== Finland ===
In Finland, Finnish and Swedish are both considered national languages. Municipalities of Finland are divided into three categories: unilingual Swedish, unilingual Finnish or bilingual. Finnish is the maternal language of about 90% of the population, and the bilingual or swedophone population is concentrated to the coastal areas of Ostrobothnia and Southwest Finland. The autonomous province of Åland is officially unilingual (Swedish). Both Swedish and Finnish are compulsory school subjects.

=== Hong Kong ===
Hong Kong is officially bilingual. Both English and Chinese (Standard Mandarin and Cantonese) are official languages.

=== North Macedonia ===
The official, national and most widespread languages in the Republic of North Macedonia are Macedonian and Albanian. Apart from it, North Macedonia officially recognizes five national minority languages: Turkish, Romani, Serbian, Bosnian, and Aromanian. The Macedonian Sign Language is the country's official sign language. As of 2019, the Albanian language is recognized as an official language on the territory of North Macedonia.

=== Philippines ===
The Philippine constitution designates Filipino as the national language and – along with English – as official languages. Spanish was the national and official language of the country for more than three centuries under Spanish colonial rule, and became the lingua franca of the Philippines in the 19th and early 20th centuries. It remained, along with English, as a de facto official language until removed in 1973 by a constitutional change. After a few months it was re-designated an official language by presidential decree and remained official until 1987, when the present Constitution removed its official status. Spanish and Arabic are currently designated to be promoted on a voluntary and optional basis.

Some people in native Tagalog areas are bilingual, while in non-Tagalog areas it is common to be multilingual in Filipino, English, and in one or more of the regional languages, or as in other cases in languages such as Spanish, Minnan (Hokkien), and Arabic due to factors such as ancestry and religion. Eleven regional languages are recognised by the government as auxiliary official languages in their respective regions, while 90+ other languages and dialects are spoken by various groups.

=== Other bilingual or multilingual countries ===
- Cook Islands
- Eswatini
- Haiti
- India
- Iraq
- Ireland
- Kazakhstan
- Kenya
- Kiribati
- Kosovo
- Kyrgyzstan
- Lesotho
- Macau
- Madagascar
- Malta
- Marshall Islands
- Morocco
- New Zealand
- Niue
- Pakistan
- Palau
- Paraguay
- Samoa
- Somalia
- Sri Lanka
- Sudan
- Tanzania
- Timor-Leste
- Tonga
- Tunisia
- Tuvalu
- Ukraine
- Uganda

== Officially multilingual ==
- Belgium
- Bolivia
- Comoros
- Equatorial Guinea
- Eritrea
- Fiji
- India
- Lebanon
- Luxembourg
- Nigeria
- Norway
- Papua New Guinea
- Peru
- Rwanda
- Seychelles
- South Africa
- Singapore
- Switzerland
- Vanuatu
- Zimbabwe
- Netherlands
