= New Brunswick Confederation of Regions Party =

Canadian provincial political party

- Former provincial party
- Founder: Arch Pafford
- Founded: 1989
- Dissolved: March 31, 2002
- Ideology: Conservatism; Regionalism; Anti-bilingualism
- Political position: Right-wing
- Colours: Green, Yellow
- Most MLAs (1991): 8 / 58

The New Brunswick Confederation of Regions Party was a political party in the Province of New Brunswick, Canada. It was the only branch of the Confederation of Regions Party of Canada to win any seats in their respective legislature. Having won the second most seats in the 1991 provincial election, the party was the official opposition in the Legislative Assembly between 1991 and 1995, before losing all its seats in the following election.

== History ==
=== Uprising ===
In the late 1980s, support for the Progressive Conservative Party of Premier Richard Hatfield had collapsed because of corruption scandals in the government. As well, many English-speaking New Brunswickers were unhappy with the government's promotion of official bilingualism (the use of English and French in public services).

The federal Confederation of Regions Party (CoR) promised to repeal the 1969 Official Languages Act, which made the English and French languages equal for all official purposes in all public services. CoR proposed providing government services in French only in areas with a predominantly francophone population. The French-speaking Acadian population believed this to be an anti-francophone policy, and so the CoR had no support in areas of majority francophone population.

In the 1988 federal election, the CoR Party had considerable success in New Brunswick, where it nominated candidates in seven of the ten electoral ridings and captured 4.3% of the vote within the province.

=== Formation ===
The CoR Party's New Brunswick provincial wing was founded in 1989. Miramichi businessman Arch Pafford was elected its first leader, and former Hatfield cabinet minister Ed Allen became the party's most notable candidate. Blaine Higgs, who would decades later become leader of the Progressive Conservative Party and Premier, also ran for the CoR leadership, placing second behind Pafford.

=== 1991 provincial election ===
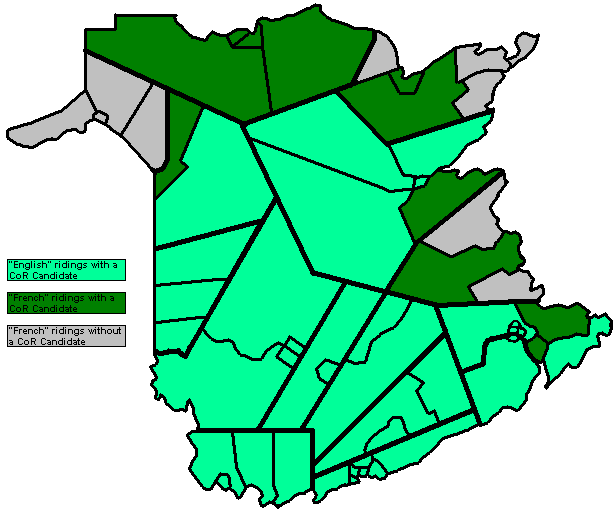
Ridings with CoR candidates in the 1991 election

The party's greatest success came in the 1991 provincial election. Going into the election, the Liberals held all the seats in the legislature, but many conservatives, especially in the Fredericton area and rural southern New Brunswick, were still upset with the Progressive Conservatives over the issue of bilingualism. CoR was able to capitalize on the situation, winning 21.04% of the vote (87,256 votes) and eight seats despite only running candidates in 48 of the 58 ridings.Despite their success, the CoR Party's leader, Arch Pafford, did not win his seat, placing third behind the Liberal and Progressive Conservative in Miramichi-Newcastle. Danny Cameron, who won his seat in York South, was chosen as the party's interim leader following the election.

The party ran full slates in Northumberland, Westmorland and Victoria counties, which have mixed English-speaking and Acadian populations, and a full slate in the Acadian-but-bilingual Restigouche county. The party also nominated one candidate in Kent County and two in Gloucester County. No candidates for the CoR ran in the very unilingual French Madawaska County. The Progressive Conservatives, which ran a full slate of 58 candidates, received only 20.7% of the vote and three seats.

The results allowed the CoR Party to form the official opposition, and their success prompted pro-bilingual politicians in the governing Liberal Party to enshrine section 16.1 in the Charter of Rights in 1993. The section guarantees equality between English-speaking and French-speaking residents of New Brunswick.

=== Internal divisions ===
Internal differences resulted in political infighting within the CoR. A rivalry formed between Cameron, who was seen as a moderate within the party, and fellow CoR MLA Brent Taylor, who was seen as more radical. A year after Cameron's election as interim leader, the party's board of directors sought to remove him. A structural problem arose, as the party policy was that an elected member is responsible to the electorate first, the party second, and the leader last, yet under its constitution the board of directors (and not the elected caucus) could call a leadership convention, which inevitably gave the party control over the elected members.Martin, Geoffrey (1995). "The Rise and Fall of the New Brunswick CoR Party, 1988-1995". Canadian Parliamentary Review. 18 (3): 19–22. The party council then held a leadership race at the 1992 convention in Campbellton, where Taylor narrowly defeated Cameron and became leader. However, Cameron and his supporters argued that the race was illegal. Cameron's supporters later gained control over the party's presidency, allowing Cameron to fire a large portion of the party executive and council. Taylor and fellow CoR MLA Bev Brine were kicked out of the caucus in 1994 due to their ongoing opposition to Cameron. During this period, party membership dropped from 20,000 to 5,000.

Cameron eventually chose to resign the leadership to try to settle the internal divisions affecting the party. The entire party membership was allowed to vote in the race that followed. Pro-Taylor Gary Ewart was chosen over pro-Cameron Greg Hargrove, but neither Ewart nor caucus leader Ab Rector were able to resolve their differences with Cameron's supporters. Ewart resigned 23 days later, leaving the party in limbo.

=== 1995 provincial election ===
The executive elected Greg Hargrove leader in time for the 1995 election, but the damage had been done. None of the party Members of the Legislative Assembly were re-elected in 1995, and the party received just 27,684 votes (7.1% of the popular vote), placing them behind the New Democrats.

=== 1999 provincial election ===
By 1999, Conservative voters were being wooed back by the charismatic leadership of Bernard Lord, who looked poised to return the party to power after ten years in the wilderness. The Confederation of Regions Party, now led by Jim Webb, slipped further in the 1999 provincial election to just 2,807 votes (0.7% of the total). Following the election, Colby Fraser, who had run federally for the party in 1988, replaced Webb as leader.

=== Dissolution ===
In 2001, Fraser contacted the remaining members, who voted to dissolve the party. The dissolution formally occurred March 31, 2002.

== Leaders ==
- Arch Pafford (1989–1991)
- Danny Cameron (1991–1992) (interim leader)
- Brent Taylor (1992) - Taylor's election was later deemed illegal
- Danny Cameron (1992–1995)
- Ab Rector (1995) (interim leader)
- Gary Ewart (1995)
- Ab Rector (1995) (interim leader)
- Greg Hargrove (1995–1999)
- Jim Webb (1999)
- Colby Fraser (1999–2002)

== Members of the New Brunswick Legislative Assembly ==
- Edwin G. Allen, Fredericton North (1991-1995)
- Beverly Brine, Albert (1991-1994)
- Danny Cameron, York South (1991-1995) (leader)
- Greg Hargrove, York North (1991-1995)
- Ab Rector, Oromocto (1991-1995)
- Brent Taylor, Southwest Miramichi (1991-1994)
- Gordon Willden, Riverview (1991-1995)
- Max White, Sunbury (1991-1995)

== Election results ==
The CoR Party contested three general elections, with diminishing success. Despite being shut out of the legislature in 1995, they placed second in a number of ridings while by 1999 they placed fourth in every riding they ran a candidate.

Election	Seats Won	Second place	Third place	Fourth place	Not on ballot
1991	8	18	17	5	10
1995	-	2	17	17	19
1999	-	-	-	18	37

== See also ==
- List of political parties in New Brunswick
