= Danny Gay (politician) =

Canadian politician (born 1950)

- Born: December 12, 1950 (age 75); Chatham, New Brunswick, Canada
- Occupation: politician

Donald "Danny" David Gay (born December 12, 1950) was a politician in the Province of New Brunswick, Canada. He served as Speaker of the Legislative Assembly of New Brunswick from 1995 to 1997.

He was educated at St. Francis Xavier University and Mount Saint Vincent University. Gay, a New Brunswick Liberal, was elected to the legislature in the 1987 election which saw his party win every seat under Frank McKenna. He was re-elected in the 1991 and 1995 elections but was defeated in 1999.

He was elected Speaker following the 1995 election but resigned to join McKenna's cabinet in 1997 as Minister of Fisheries. He continued in that post under Ray Frenette and Camille Thériault who succeeded McKenna as Premier of New Brunswick.

Following his defeat in 1999, he worked for the federal government in Ottawa, and then taught English in China. He took a leave of absence from his teaching job to return to Canada to run as an independent in the 2006 federal election opposing Liberal incumbent Charles Hubbard; he was defeated.

Preceded by Shirley Dysart	Speaker of the Legislative Assembly of New Brunswick; 1995–1997	Succeeded by John McKay
