= 2011 New Brunswick New Democratic Party leadership election =

- Date: April 26, 2011
- Resigning leader: Roger Duguay
- Won by: Dominic Cardy
- Ballots: acclamation
- Candidates: 1

The New Brunswick New Democratic Party, a social democratic political party in the Canadian province of New Brunswick, scheduled a leadership election for April 16, 2011, following the resignation of previous leader Roger Duguay on October 25, 2010.

Although there were two candidates in the race, candidate Pierre Cyr withdrew from the race after he was given written notice that chief electoral officer Stephen Beam ruled that there were problems with his nomination papers. Dominic Cardy, the only remaining candidate at the close of nominations, was named as the new leader on March 2, 2011, concluding the electoral process.

Cyr subsequently announced that he was considering an appeal of his disqualification from the race, although he subsequently withdrew the appeal.

== Candidates ==
- Dominic Cardy, the party's campaign director from the 2010 provincial election, announced he would be a candidate on December 7, 2010.

== Withdrawn ==
- Pierre Cyr, 2010 provincial election candidate in Nepisiguit finishing third with 24.7% of the vote.

== Declined ==
- Yvon Godin, MP for Acadie-Bathurst since 1997 said he has "no intention to run for the provincial leadership."

== Timeline ==
- October 25, 2010 - Duguay resigns as leader of the NDP, the party announces it will elect a new leader within six months.
- November 28, 2010 - Jesse Travis, NDP candidate for New Maryland-Sunbury West in the 2010 election, is chosen as interim leader.
- February 27, 2011 - Cyr is disqualified from the election.
- March 2, 2011 - Cardy is acclaimed as the party's new leader upon the close of nominations.

== See also ==
- 1988 New Brunswick New Democratic Party leadership election
- 2005 New Brunswick New Democratic Party leadership election
- 2007 New Brunswick New Democratic Party leadership election
- 2017 New Brunswick New Democratic Party leadership election
- 2021 New Brunswick New Democratic Party leadership election
