= 2017 New Brunswick New Democratic Party leadership election =

- Date: ~~October 27, 2017~~
- Resigning leader: Dominic Cardy
- Won by: Jennifer McKenzie
- Ballots: acclaimed
- Candidates: 1
- Entrance fee: $2,000

The New Democratic Party of New Brunswick leadership election of 2017 was called due to the resignation of New Brunswick New Democratic Party leader Dominic Cardy on January 1, 2017. The leadership election was scheduled for October 27, 2017. However, as the only candidate, Jennifer McKenzie registered at the close of nominations on August 4, 2017, the party executive confirmed McKenzie as party leader effective August 10, 2017.

After almost six years as leader, Cardy resigned both as leader and as a member of the party, complaining of infighting as well as his disagreements with the policies of the party's federal counterpart, the New Democratic Party.

== Rules ==
The leader shall be elected by a preferential ballot on which members rank their order of preference for the contestants on the ballot. All members in good standing as of September 27, 2017 at 5:00 p.m. shall receive a ballot by mail.

== Timeline ==
- March 2, 2011 – Cardy acclaimed party leader in the 2011 leadership election.
- June 25, 2012 – Cardy places third in the Rothesay by-election.
- September 22, 2014 – The NDP, led by Cardy, fails to win a seat in the 2014 general election though the party's popular support increases by 2.5 percentage points to 12.98%. Cardy himself places second in Fredericton West-Hanwell. The Green Party of New Brunswick, meanwhile, wins its first seat in the New Brunswick legislature displacing the NDP as the province's third party. Cardy announces his resignation as party leader.
- October 21, 2014 – Cardy agrees to delay his resignation in order to contest a by-election in Saint John East, after its newly elected MLA unexpectedly resigns.
- November 17, 2014 – Cardy is defeated in the by-election, placing third.
- December 10, 2014 – The party executive rejects Cardy's resignation and urges him to remain, offering him a salary for the first time. Cardy agrees.
- Fall 2016 – Memramcook-Tantramar riding association passes a resolution calling for a leadership review, claiming, of Cardy, that "[h]is style of leadership has not been constructive in terms of building bridges, he's been mostly burning bridges and alienating a lot of people in the party."
- January 1, 2017 – Cardy announces his resignation as both party leader and as a party member, alleging that "destructive forces" had colluded with the leadership of the Canadian Union of Public Employees (New Brunswick) against him, and accusing his opponents of being "extremists" and "communists". Party president Sharon Levesque also resigns. Cardy subsequently joined the Progressive Conservative Party of New Brunswick as its director of strategic issues.
- January 9, 2017 – Rosaire L'Italien, a past federal NDP candidate and retired journalist, is appointed interim leader by the party executive.
- March 20, 2017 – Campaign period begins.
- August 4, 2017 – Nomination period closes at 4 p.m. AT. Jennifer McKenzie is the only nominee.
- August 10, 2017 at 11:00 a.m. – The party held a press conference at the Fredericton Inn announcing that the party executive has confirmed Jennifer McKenzie as party leader.

== Candidate ==
- Jennifer McKenzie, federal NDP candidate in Fundy Royal (2015), former chair of the Ottawa-Carleton District School Board

== Declined ==
- Patrick Colford, president of the New Brunswick Federation of Labour
- Yvon Godin, MP for Acadie—Bathurst (1997–2015)
- Kelly Lamrock, interim executive director of the New Brunswick NDP (2016–2017), NDP candidate (2014), joined NDP in 2013, Liberal MLA (2003–2010), Attorney General of New Brunswick (2010), Minister of Social Development (2009–2010), Minister of Education (2006–2008).
- Rosaire L'Italien, interim leader (2017), federal NDP candidate (2015)

== See also ==
- 1988 New Brunswick New Democratic Party leadership election
- 2005 New Brunswick New Democratic Party leadership election
- 2007 New Brunswick New Democratic Party leadership election
- 2011 New Brunswick New Democratic Party leadership election
- 2021 New Brunswick New Democratic Party leadership election
