= Yvon Godin =

Canadian politician

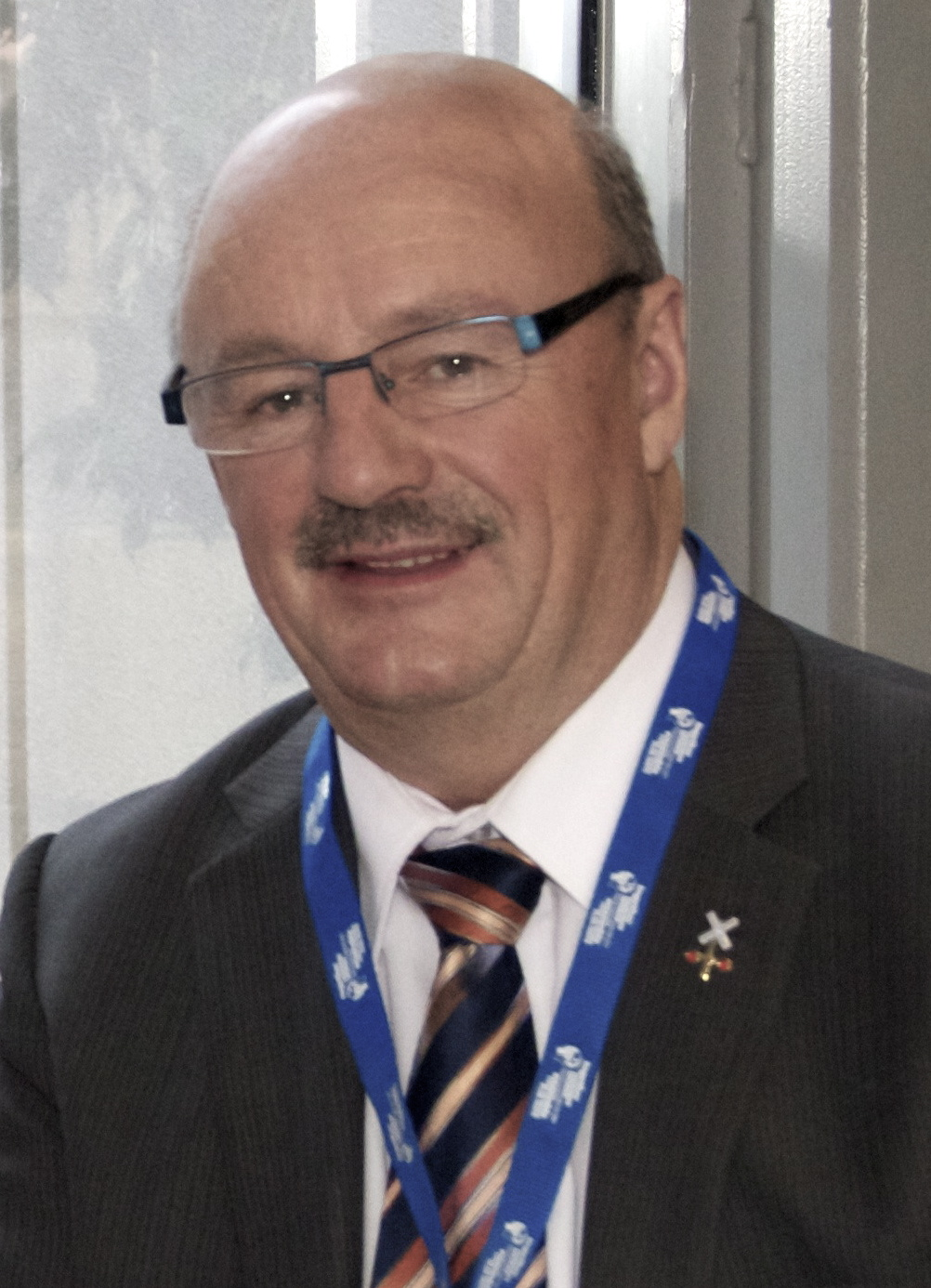
- Godin in 2014

Shadow Minister for Labour
- In office May 26, 2011 – April 18, 2012
- Leader: Jack Layton; Nycole Turmel
- Preceded by: Maria Minna
- Succeeded by: Alexandre Boulerice

Member of Parliament for Acadie—Bathurst
- In office June 2, 1997 – October 19, 2015
- Preceded by: Doug Young
- Succeeded by: Serge Cormier

Personal details
- Born: May 12, 1955 (age 70) Bathurst, New Brunswick
- Party: New Democratic
- Spouse: Lyna Mainville
- Profession: miner, labour representative
- Website: web.archive.org/web/20110623045024/http://yvongodin.ndp.ca:80/

Yvon Godin (born May 12, 1955) is a Canadian politician.

Godin was a New Democratic Party (NDP) Member of Parliament (MP) in the House of Commons of Canada, representing the riding of Acadie—Bathurst from 1997 until his retirement in 2015. Previously, Godin was a labour representative for the United Steelworkers. He was the NDP critic for Labour and Official Languages in his last term in parliament.

In 2003, he supported Bill Blaikie's campaign to lead the NDP.

== Involvement with the New Brunswick NDP ==
As federal MP, Godin had a strained relationship with former New Brunswick New Democratic Party leader Elizabeth Weir. Following her resignation in 2005, however, there were rumours that Godin might resign his federal seat and run to replace her as provincial party leader at the party's 2005 leadership convention. Ultimately, Godin declined to stand as a candidate, and Allison Brewer was elected NB NDP leader.

Following a poor showing in the 2006 New Brunswick provincial election, Brewer also resigned, and there were renewed rumours Godin would seek the leadership. However Godin demurred again, instead endorsing former priest Roger Duguay. Duguay had run in the provincial riding of Miramichi Bay-Neguac in the last provincial election, and received 26.2% of the vote, the best showing of any NDP candidate. The Miramichi Bay-Neguac riding overlaps with Godin's federal riding. Duguay was subsequently elected leader at the party's October 13, 2007 leadership convention but resigned after a disappointing result in the 2010 provincial election

Godin also had a strained relationship with Duguay's successor, Dominic Cardy. Following the 2014 provincial election, Godin criticized Cardy's leadership saying that Cardy had moved the provincial party too far to the centre. "The problem, I think, with the provincial party, with Dominic, was that I think he was too much to the right to even be in the centre, and I think people read into that," said Godin who added: "I think it did hurt the party. People were looking for the NDP, they were doing really well, and [voters] wanted change from the existing parties that we have now, who are serving the big corporations and forgetting about the people. I think that's what happened." Cardy retorted by accusing Godin of failing to involve himself in the development of the provincial party's platform, saying "He's never been to a provincial party meeting during my time as leader."

== Claim of breached privilege ==
In September 2014, Godin claimed that his privileges as a Member were breached when he was delayed in accessing the Parliamentary precinct during an official visit by German President Joachim Gauck. In a committee meeting on October 21, video evidence was presented that showed Godin was delayed in crossing the street by just 70 seconds. In response, Godin demanded to know whether the video had been sped up.

== Electoral record ==
2011 Canadian federal election: Acadie—Bathurst
Party	Candidate	Votes	%	±%	Expenditures
New Democratic	Yvon Godin	32,067	69.69	+12.27	$59,706.29
Conservative	Louis Robichaud	7,456	16.20	-2.39	$30,447.79
Liberal	Jean Marie Gionet	6,491	14.11	-7.86	$50,735.74
Total valid votes/expense limit		46,014	100.0		$82,556.86
Total rejected, unmarked and declined ballots		595	1.33	+0.21	
Turnout		46,609	70.30	+1.98	
Eligible voters		66,298			
New Democratic hold		Swing		+7.33	

2008 Canadian federal election: Acadie—Bathurst
Party	Candidate	Votes	%	±%	Expenditures
New Democratic	Yvon Godin	25,849	57.53	+7.63	$57,376.65
Liberal	Odette Robichaud	9,850	21.92	-8.79	$32,225.33
Conservative	Jean-Guy Dubé	8,331	18.54	+1.68	$67,790.01
Green	Michelle Aubin	904	2.01	+0.63	none listed
Total valid votes/expense limit		44,934	100.0		$80,066
Total rejected, unmarked and declined ballots		507	1.12	+0.09	
Turnout		45,441	68.32	-7.14	
Eligible voters		66,509			
New Democratic hold		Swing		+8.21	

2006 Canadian federal election: Acadie—Bathurst
Party	Candidate	Votes	%	±%	Expenditures
New Democratic	Yvon Godin	25,195	49.90	-4.03	$69,502.02
Liberal	Marcelle Mersereau	15,504	30.71	-1.96	$65,035.20
Conservative	Serge Savoie	8,513	16.86	+5.92	$54,729.58
Green	Philippe Rouselle	699	1.38	-1.07	$774.79
Independent	Eric Landry	362	0.72	–	$2,613.63
Independent	Ulric Degrâce	219	0.43	–	none listed
Total valid votes/expense limit		50,492	100.0		$74,710
Total rejected, unmarked and declined ballots		523	1.03	-0.15	
Turnout		51,015	75.46	+5.08	
Eligible voters		67,608			
New Democratic hold		Swing		-1.04	

2004 Canadian federal election: Acadie—Bathurst
Party	Candidate	Votes	%	±%	Expenditures
New Democratic	Yvon Godin	23,857	53.93	+7.26	$61,745.98
Liberal	Serge Rousselle	14,452	32.67	-7.75	$60,252.15
Conservative	Joel Bernard	4,841	10.94	-1.97	$51,943.73
Green	Mario Lanteigne	1,085	2.45	–	$7,040.66
Total valid votes/expense limit		44,235	100.0		$71,582
Total rejected, unmarked and declined ballots		527	1.18	-0.04	
Turnout		44,762	70.38	-4.99	
Eligible voters		63,603			
New Democratic notional hold		Swing		+7.50	
Changes from 2000 are based on redistributed results. Conservative Party change is based on the combination of Canadian Alliance and Progressive Conservative Party totals.

2000 Canadian federal election: Acadie—Bathurst
Party	Candidate	Votes	%	±%	Expenditures
New Democratic	Yvon Godin	23,568	46.61	+6.08	$57,177
Liberal	Bernard Thériault	20,362	40.27	+4.91	$58,623
Progressive Conservative	Alcide Leger	4,321	8.55	-15.56	$36,600
Alliance	Jean Gauvin	2,314	4.58	–	$45,973
Total valid votes/expense limit		50,565	100.00	$63,209	
Total rejected ballots		624	1.22	-1.25	
Turnout		51,189	75.37	-3.28	
Electors on the lists		67,918	–	–	
NDP hold		Swing	+0.59		

1997 Canadian federal election: Acadie—Bathurst
Party	Candidate	Votes	%	±%	Expenditures
New Democratic	Yvon Godin	21,113	40.53	+34.57	$56,390
Liberal	Doug Young	18,421	35.36	-30.99	$53,440
Progressive Conservative	Norma Landry	12,560	24.11	-3.58	$51,562
Total valid votes/expense limit		52,094	100.00	$60,877	
Total rejected ballots		1,318	2.47	–	
Turnout		53,412	78.65	–	
Electors on the lists		67,912	–	–	
NDP gain from Liberal		Swing	+32.8		
