= 1988 New Brunswick New Democratic Party leadership election =

- Date: June 18, 1988
- Convention: Fredericton
- Resigning leader: George Little
- Won by: Elizabeth Weir
- Ballots: 1
- Candidates: 2

The New Brunswick New Democratic Party, a social democratic political party in the Canadian province of New Brunswick, held a leadership election in 1988, following the resignation of previous leader George Little after the party had been unable to win any seats in the 1987 provincial election. Robert Arthur Hall served as interim leader following Little's resignation.

== Candidates ==
- Mona Beaulieu, payroll officer at an Edmundston Hospital and activist with the New Brunswick Federation of Labour
- Elizabeth Weir, lawyer and former executive director of the New Brunswick NDP.

== Convention ==
Weir had entered the convention as the sole candidate and was strongly associated with the party establishment. It was assumed heading into the convention that she was to be acclaimed. However, a rebellion over control of the party erupted with the labour movement demanding a greater say in the party. Beaulieu was put forward from the convention floor by labour delegates as a challenger to Weir and came within 5 votes of beating her.

== Results ==
Candidate	Votes	
Candidate	#	%
Elizabeth Weir	50	52.6
Mona Beaulieu	45	47.4
Total	95	100

== See also ==
- 2005 New Brunswick New Democratic Party leadership election
- 2007 New Brunswick New Democratic Party leadership election
- 2011 New Brunswick New Democratic Party leadership election
- 2017 New Brunswick New Democratic Party leadership election
- 2021 New Brunswick New Democratic Party leadership election
