= Doug Moore =

Canadian politician

MLA for Victoria–Tobique
- In office 1976–1987
- Preceded by: J. Stewart Brooks
- Succeeded by: Larry Kennedy

Personal details
- Born: March 23, 1939 New Glasgow, Nova Scotia
- Died: February 3, 2016 (aged 76) Perth-Andover, New Brunswick
- Party: Progressive Conservative Party of New Brunswick

Joseph Douglas Moore (March 23, 1939 – February 3, 2016) was a Canadian politician. He served in the Legislative Assembly of New Brunswick from 1976 to 1987, as a Progressive Conservative member for the constituency of Victoria–Tobique.
