= Victoria-Tobique =

Defunct provincial electoral district in New Brunswick, Canada

New Brunswick electoral district
- Coordinates: 46.810°N 67.571°W

Defunct provincial electoral district
- Legislature: Legislative Assembly of New Brunswick
- District created: 1973
- District abolished: 2013
- First contested: 1974
- Last contested: 2010

Victoria-Tobique was a provincial electoral district for the Legislative Assembly of New Brunswick, Canada. This riding was created in the 1973 redistribution when New Brunswick moved to single member districts. It had previously been part of the Victoria district which returned two members.

The riding, which was not changed in the 1994 redistribution, is made up of the anglophone parts of Victoria County which are primarily along the Tobique River. It includes three incorporated municipalities: Perth-Andover, Plaster Rock, and Aroostook as well as the Tobique First Nation Indian reserve.

In 2006, it added small parts of Carleton County to its territory. It was abolished in the 2013 redistribution.

== Members of the Legislative Assembly ==
Assembly	Years	Member	Party
Riding created from Victoria
48th	1974–1976	Stewart Brooks	Progressive Conservative
48th	1976–1978	Doug Moore	Progressive Conservative
49th	1978–1982	Doug Moore	Progressive Conservative
50th	1982–1987	Doug Moore	Progressive Conservative
51st	1987–1991	Larry Kennedy	Liberal
52nd	1991–1995	Larry Kennedy	Liberal
53rd	1995–1997	Larry Kennedy	Liberal
53rd	1997–1999	Larry Kennedy	Liberal
54th	1999–2003	Larry Kennedy	Liberal
55th	2003–2006	Larry Kennedy	Liberal
56th	2006–2010	Larry Kennedy	Liberal
57th	2010–2014	Wes McLean	Progressive Conservative
Riding dissolved into Carleton-Victoria and Victoria-la-Vallée

== Election results ==
2010 New Brunswick general election
Party	Candidate	Votes	%	±%
Progressive Conservative	Wes McLean	2,687	52.85	+27.15
Liberal	Larry Kennedy	2,040	40.13	-31.44
Independent	Carter Edgar	140	2.75	–
Green	Wayne Sabine	120	2.36	–
New Democratic	O. David Burns	97	1.91	-0.82
Total valid votes		5,084	100.0	
Total rejected ballots		30	0.59	
Turnout		5,114	68.16	
Eligible voters		7,503		
Progressive Conservative gain from Liberal		Swing		+29.30

2006 New Brunswick general election
Party	Candidate	Votes	%	±%
Liberal	Larry R. Kennedy	4,040	71.57	+14.07
Progressive Conservative	Chris McLaughlin	1,451	25.70	-8.28
New Democratic	Paul Kendal	154	2.73	-5.79
Total valid votes		5,645	100.0	
Liberal hold		Swing		+11.18

2003 New Brunswick general election
Party	Candidate	Votes	%	±%
Liberal	Larry Kennedy	3,386	57.50	+7.41
Progressive Conservative	Dennis Campbell	2,001	33.98	-10.36
New Democratic	Harvey Bass	502	8.52	+6.21
Total valid votes		5,889	100.0	
Liberal hold		Swing		+8.88

1999 New Brunswick general election
Party	Candidate	Votes	%	±%
Liberal	Larry Kennedy	3,127	50.09	-2.24
Progressive Conservative	Carmen Cecil Pirie	2,768	44.34	-1.29
Independent	Carter Charles Edgar	204	3.27	–
New Democratic	Amy Dunham	144	2.31	+0.27
Total valid votes		6,243	100.0	
Liberal hold		Swing		-0.48

New Brunswick provincial by-election, 1997
Party	Candidate	Votes	%	±%
Liberal	Dr. Larry Kennedy	3,510	52.33	+8.55
Progressive Conservative	Greg Inman	3,061	45.63	+1.96
New Democratic	Deanna Grant	137	2.04	+0.29
Confederation of Regions	nil	withdrawn		
Total valid votes		6,708	100.0	
Liberal hold		Swing		+3.30

1995 New Brunswick general election
Party	Candidate	Votes	%	±%
Liberal	Larry Kennedy	2,845	43.78	-0.77
Progressive Conservative	Greg Inman	2,838	43.67	+17.69
Confederation of Regions	Kevin Jensen	592	9.11	-15.55
New Democratic	Leslie Ferguson	114	1.75	-3.06
Independent	Carter Edgar	109	1.68	–
Total valid votes		6,498	100.0	
Liberal hold		Swing		-9.23

1991 New Brunswick general election
Party	Candidate	Votes	%	±%
Liberal	Larry R. Kennedy	2,854	44.55	-15.70
Progressive Conservative	Neville J. Crabbe	1,664	25.98	-7.85
Confederation of Regions	Carl Skaarup	1,580	24.66	–
New Democratic	Cheryl Ann Elizabeth Pelkey	308	4.81	-1.11
Total valid votes		6,406	100.0	
Liberal hold		Swing		-3.92

1987 New Brunswick general election
Party	Candidate	Votes	%	±%
Liberal	Dr. Larry R. Kennedy	3,787	60.25	+16.96
Progressive Conservative	J. Douglas Moore	2,126	33.83	-17.24
New Democratic	Evelyn Hathaway	372	5.92	+0.28
Total valid votes		6,285	100.0	
Liberal gain from Progressive Conservative		Swing		+17.10

1982 New Brunswick general election
Party	Candidate	Votes	%	±%
Progressive Conservative	J. Douglas Moore	3,015	51.07	+1.03
Liberal	Maurice A. Dionne	2,556	43.29	+6.49
New Democratic	Earl W. Christensen	333	5.64	-7.53
Total valid votes		5,904	100.0	
Progressive Conservative hold		Swing		-2.73

1978 New Brunswick general election
Party	Candidate	Votes	%	±%
Progressive Conservative	J. Douglas Moore	2,763	50.04	-2.65
Liberal	Bruce Hoyt	2,032	36.80	-7.64
New Democratic	Earl W. Christensen	727	13.17	+10.30
Total valid votes		5,522	100.0	
Progressive Conservative hold		Swing		+2.50

1974 New Brunswick general election
Party	Candidate	Votes	%
Progressive Conservative	J. Stewart Brooks	2,553	52.69
Liberal	Roger Pelkey	2,153	44.44
New Democratic	Robert M. Stiles	139	2.87
Total valid votes		4,845	100.0
The previous multi-member riding of Victoria went totally Progressive Conservative in the last election, with J. Stewart Brooks being one of two incumbents.

== See also ==
- List of New Brunswick provincial electoral districts
- Canadian provincial electoral districts
