= Dominic Cardy =

Canadian politician

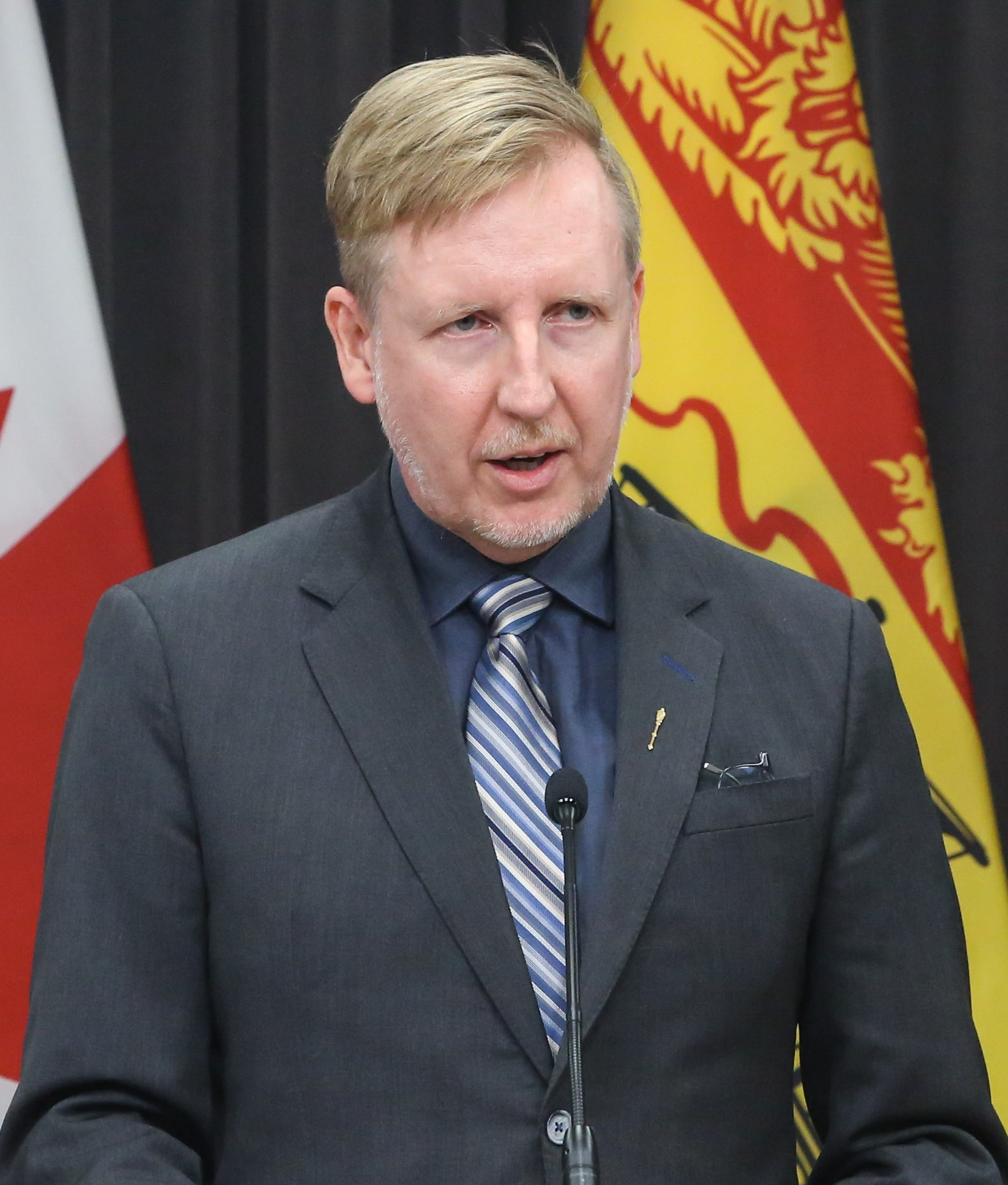
- Cardy in 2020

Leader of the Canadian Future Party
- Incumbent
- Assumed office 9 November 2024; Interim: 20 September 2023 - 9 November 2024
- Preceded by: Office established

Minister of Education and Early Childhood Development
- In office 9 November 2018 – 13 October 2022
- Premier: Blaine Higgs
- Preceded by: Brian Kenny
- Succeeded by: Bill Hogan

Member of the New Brunswick Legislative Assembly for Fredericton West-Hanwell
- In office 24 September 2018 – 19 September 2024
- Preceded by: Brian Macdonald
- Succeeded by: riding abolished

Leader of the New Brunswick New Democratic Party
- In office 2 March 2011 – 1 January 2017
- Preceded by: Jesse Travis
- Succeeded by: Rosaire L'Italien

Personal details
- Born: Dominic William Cardy; 25 July 1970 (age 56) Oxford, England
- Party: Canadian Future (federal)
- Other political affiliations: New Democratic (1984–2017); Progressive Conservative (provincial, 2017–2022); Conservative (federal, 2017—2022); Independent (provincial, 2022–present)
- Spouse: Julie Smith (m. May 21, 2023)

Dominic William Cardy (born 25 July 1970) is a Canadian politician, leader of the Canadian Future Party and a former Member of the Legislative Assembly of New Brunswick (2018–2024) and provincial cabinet minister (2018–2022).

From the 2018 New Brunswick general election until his expulsion from the caucus in October 2022, Cardy represented the electoral district of Fredericton West-Hanwell for the Progressive Conservative Party of New Brunswick. He then sat as an independent. During his time in government he was the Minister of Education and Early Childhood Development under Blaine Higgs. Since September 2023, Cardy has been the leader of the Canadian Future Party, a newly-formed moderate centrist federal political party.

Prior to being elected to the New Brunswick legislature, Cardy served as chief of staff of the Progressive Conservative Party of New Brunswick caucus and had previously been leader of the New Brunswick New Democratic Party from 2011 to 2017.

== Early life ==
Born in the United Kingdom, Cardy moved to Fredericton, New Brunswick with his family when he was a child. He attended Dalhousie University and graduated with a political science degree.

Cardy worked for the Department of Foreign Affairs in 2000 on projects to increase public support for the banning of land mines and for the National Democratic Institute for International Affairs (NDI) between 2001 and 2008. He served as a senior staff member and then country director for NDI in Nepal, Bangladesh and Cambodia.

== Political career ==
While a student at Dalhousie University in Nova Scotia, Cardy was elected President of the Nova Scotia NDP's youth wing. He then worked as a party campaigner, political assistant to an NDP MP in Cape Breton, and managed several campaigns at the municipal and federal level. He served as assistant provincial secretary of the Nova Scotia NDP from 1996 to 1997.

In 2000, Cardy co-founded NDProgress, a pressure group within the NDP that advocated the modernisation of the party's governance structures and was sympathetic to the Third Way. In writing about the debate within the NDP prior to its 2001 convention between the New Politics Initiative and those such as NDProgress, Cardy wrote "Some want to see the NDP recreated as a mass party based on the ideas of the traditional left, but infused with the energy of the new social movements and the anti-globalization activists. And there are those pushing from another direction, taking inspiration from the European socialists. If I had my choice I would fall firmly into this camp, those who want the party to follow the path laid by social democrats like Gary Doer, Tony Blair and Gerhard Schröder." He is also an admirer of US Secretary of State Madeleine Albright.

Cardy was campaign director for the NDP in the 2010 New Brunswick general election.

=== Provincial politics ===
==== NDP leader ====
Cardy was acclaimed party leader on 2 March 2011 after the only other candidate for the position, Pierre Cyr, was disqualified from the party's 2011 leadership election. At the 2012 New Brunswick New Democratic Party convention, Cardy received an 82 per cent vote of confidence in his leadership from the assembled delegates.

During the 2012 federal NDP leadership race, Cardy backed Thomas Mulcair, and was one of the introductory speakers at his campaign launch.

Cardy was the NDP's candidate in a 25 June 2012 provincial by-election in Rothesay, coming in third with 27 per cent of the vote.

As leader, Cardy recruited a slate of candidates that included several prominent former Conservative and Liberal politicians including former Liberal cabinet minister Kelly Lamrock in Fredericton South; Bev Harrison, a former Conservative and Speaker of the legislature, in Hampton; former Liberal MLA Abel LeBlanc in Saint John-Lancaster and former Liberal candidate John Wilcox in Rothesay. Former party leader Allison Brewer endorsed the Greens due to the policy positions of Cardy's NDP.

In the 2014 provincial election, Cardy ran as the party's candidate in Fredericton West-Hanwell.

Though it received 12.98 per cent of the vote in the 2014 provincial election, an all-time high for the NB NDP and its predecessor, the CCF, the party won no seats in the provincial legislature. Cardy himself lost to Brian Macdonald in Fredericton-Hanwell, and announced in his concession speech that he would resign as party leader effective at the party's next convention, which was postponed to January 2015. Cardy faced pressure to rescind his resignation and run in the Saint John East by-election which was called following the surprise resignation of newly elected Liberal MLA Gary Keating on 14 October 2014. Cardy announced on 21 October that he would be standing in the by-election, scheduled for 17 November, and delayed his resignation. Cardy placed third in the by-election with 21.88 per cent of the vote.

Cardy agreed to remain as leader after the party's executive rejected his resignation on 10 December 2014 and a letter was signed at the party's provincial council by supporters and former candidates urging him to stay on. The party also offered Cardy a "livable" salary beginning in 2015 due to its improved financial position. Cardy had been working as leader on a volunteer basis since assuming the position in 2011 and had no legislative salary as he was not a member of the provincial legislature.

In early 2015, federal NDP MP Yvon Godin (Acadie—Bathurst) criticised Cardy's leadership and its conduct in the election campaign saying that Cardy had moved the provincial party too far to the centre. "The problem, I think, with the provincial party, with Dominic, was that I think he was too much to the right to even be in the centre, and I think people read into that," said Godin who added: "I think it did hurt the party. People were looking for the NDP, they were doing really well, and [voters] wanted change from the existing parties that we have now, who are serving the big corporations and forgetting about the people. I think that's what happened."

In the summer of 2016, Cardy expressed his support for the proposed Energy East pipeline and supported Alberta NDP Premier Rachel Notley's position against the Leap Manifesto. He had earlier refused to endorse federal NDP leader Thomas Mulcair's leadership, saying he was troubled by positions taken by the federal party during the 2015 federal election, and skipped the April 2016 federal party convention along with the leadership review that occurred during the meeting.

==== Resignation from the NDP ====
Cardy resigned as party leader, as well as resigning his membership of both the federal and New Brunswick NDP, on 1 January 2017, complaining of party infighting which he attributed to "destructive forces" colluding with CUPE New Brunswick, the province's largest public-sector union against his leadership. Cardy said that he "cannot lead a party where a tiny minority of well-connected members refuse to accept the democratic will of the membership." He added that "limited time and energy is being wasted on infighting before the election," and that "'Some New Democrats unfortunately believe change and openness have had their time. They want to return to an old NDP of true believers, ideological litmus tests and moral victories." Cardy claimed that what he described as his "progressive" platform had been thwarted by both federal and provincial party members and denounced the federal party's non-interventionist stance on the Syrian Civil War as antithetical to his beliefs.

==== Conservative politics ====
Cardy's appointment as strategic issues director for the opposition Progressive Conservative Party of New Brunswick was announced by party leader Blaine Higgs on 27 January 2017. Cardy said it is "not my intention" to run for a legislative seat as a Progressive Conservative candidate but that a "great many" of his former colleagues in the NDP would be joining the Progressive Conservatives.

In April 2017, Cardy was promoted to the position of chief of staff to the official opposition New Brunswick Progressive Conservative caucus. Later that month he endorsed Maxime Bernier for the leadership of the Conservative Party of Canada.

Cardy was elected in the 2018 provincial election as the PC candidate in Fredericton West-Hanwell. He had run unsuccessfully in 2014 in the same riding as a New Democrat.

Cardy was re-elected in the 2020 provincial election.

==== Minister of Education and Early Childhood Development ====
Cardy was appointed as Minister of Education and Early Childhood Development on 9 November 2018. During his time as department minister, Cardy signed the original version of Policy 713, which took into effect on August 17, 2020.

===== Removal of Chinese cultural programs from New Brunswick schools =====
Minister Cardy spearheaded a plan to remove the Confucius Institute from all New Brunswick schools. While the educational programs for elementary and middle schools were removed for the 2019–2020 school year, high school programs were not removed until 2022.

===== Resignation =====
Cardy resigned from his position as Minister of Education and Early Childhood Education on October 13, 2022. Announcing his resignation on Twitter, Cardy explained that "At some point, working style and values have to matter." His resignation letter offered a more detailed explanation, citing Premier Higgs' behaviour in a series of incidents. Cardy initially committed to staying on as a Progressive Conservative but was expelled from caucus a day after resigning as minister. He was replaced as minister by Bill Hogan.

==== Independent MLA ====
Cardy remained in the legislature as an independent MLA for the rest of his term, while announcing he would not be running as a candidate in the 2024 New Brunswick general election.

Cardy said in June 2024 that he would be voting for Susan Holt and the New Brunswick Liberal Party that fall in the 2024 New Brunswick general election.

=== Canadian Future Party and other activities (2023–present) ===
On September 20, 2023, Cardy announced that he was in the process of founding a new federal political party, named the Canadian Future Party to occupy the middle ground between the Justin Trudeau-led Liberal Party of Canada and the Pierre Poilievre-led Conservative Party of Canada. Prior to its launch as a party, the group had been known first as "Centre Ice Conservatives" and then as "Centre Ice Canadians." On July 22, 2024, Elections Canada recognized the Canadian Future Party as eligible for registration, pending it standing a candidate for election.

In July 2024, Cardy was arrested in Toronto for disturbing the peace after engaging in a confrontation at a pro-Palestine protest. According to Cardy, he chanted "Free Palestine from Hamas". Authorities stated that Cardy "behaved in a confrontational manner towards other protesters and did not follow police directions" to leave the area. He was released without charges.

== Electoral record ==
2025 Canadian federal election: Fredericton—Oromocto
Party	Candidate	Votes	%	±%	Expenditures
Liberal	David Myles	30,750	61.29	+23.51	$104,116.35
Conservative	Brian Macdonald	16,200	32.29	-2.22	$101,916.42
Green	Pam Allen-Leblanc	1,568	3.13	-9.76	$64,109.83
New Democratic	Nicki Lyons-MacFarlane	908	1.81	-11.19	$304.25
Canadian Future	Dominic Cardy	345	0.69	N/A	$737.30
People's	Heather Michaud	208	0.41	+0.07	$18.03
Communist	June Patterson	146	0.29	-0.05	$0.00
Centrist	Brandon Ellis	44	0.09	N/A	$711.00
Total valid votes		50,169	99.52	+0.17	$120,219.77
Total rejected ballots		243	0.48	–0.17	
Turnout		50,412	75.75	+9.84	
Eligible voters (Note: Number of eligible voters does not include election day registrations.)		66,550			
Liberal notional hold		Swing		+12.86	
Source: Elections Canada

2020 New Brunswick general election: Fredericton West-Hanwell
Party	Candidate	Votes	%	±%
Progressive Conservative	Dominic Cardy	4,726	52.88	+21.06
Green	Susan Jonah	1,745	19.53	+2.22
Liberal	Chris Duffie	1,510	16.90	-11.03
People's Alliance	Mel Keeling	825	9.23	-11.72
New Democratic	Armand Cormier	131	1.47	-0.52
Total valid votes		8,937	100.0	
Total rejected ballots		14	0.16	
Turnout		8,951	72.26	
Eligible voters		12,387		
Progressive Conservative hold		Swing		+9.42

2018 New Brunswick general election: Fredericton West-Hanwell
Party	Candidate	Votes	%	±%
Progressive Conservative	Dominic Cardy	2,739	31.8	
Liberal	Cindy Miles	2,404	27.9	
People's Alliance	Jason Paull	1,803	20.9	
Green	Susan Jonah	1,490	17.3	
New Democratic	Olivier Hébert	171	2.0	
Total valid votes			100.0	
Total rejected ballots				
Turnout				
Eligible voters				

New Brunswick provincial by-election, Saint John East, 17 November 2014
Party	Candidate	Votes	%	±%
Progressive Conservative	Glen Savoie	2,225	44.31	+7.43
Liberal	Shelley Rinehart	1,398	27.84	-9.18
New Democratic	Dominic Cardy	1,099	21.88	+3.36
Green	Sharon Murphy	262	5.22	-0.39
People's Alliance	Arthur Watson	38	0.76	-1.21
Total valid votes		5,022	100.00	
Progressive Conservative gain from Liberal		Swing		+8.31

2014 New Brunswick general election: Fredericton West-Hanwell
Party	Candidate	Votes	%	±%
Progressive Conservative	Brian Macdonald	2,971	35.21	
NDP	Dominic Cardy	2,502	29.65	
Liberal	Bernadine Gibson	2,384	28.25	
Green	Gayla MacIntosh	582	6.90	

2012 New Brunswick provincial by-election: Rothesay
Party	Candidate	Votes	%	±%
Progressive Conservative	Hugh John "Ted" Flemming III	1,625	38.26	-18.31
Liberal	John Wilcox	1,328	31.27	+2.87
NDP	Dominic Cardy	1,158	27.27	+18.30
Green	Sharon Murphy	69	1.62	-4.43
Independent	Marjorie MacMurray	62	1.46	*
