= John Mooney (Canadian politician) =

Canadian politician (1933–2003)

Member of the Legislative Assembly of New Brunswick
- In office 1974–1978; 1987–1991
- Preceded by: none, first member Nancy Teed
- Succeeded by: Nancy Teed; Elizabeth Weir
- Constituency: Saint John South

Personal details
- Born: January 22, 1933 Saint John, New Brunswick
- Died: March 29, 2003 (aged 70) Saint John, New Brunswick
- Party: New Brunswick Liberal Association
- Education: St. Francis Xavier University
- Occupation: engineer

John Patrick Mooney (January 22, 1933 – March 29, 2003) was a Canadian politician. He served in the Legislative Assembly of New Brunswick as a Liberal member from the constituency of Saint John South.
