= Mackenzie Thomason =

Canadian politician (born 1997)

Leader of the New Brunswick New Democratic Party
- In office September 14, 2021 – June 28, 2022
- Preceded by: Chris Thompson (interim)
- Succeeded by: Alex White (interim)
- Interim
- In office March 24, 2019 – November 15, 2020
- Preceded by: Jennifer McKenzie
- Succeeded by: Nathan Davis

Personal details
- Born: July 29, 1997 (age 28)
- Party: New Democratic
- Website: mackenziethomason.ca

Mackenzie Thomason (born July 29, 1997) is a Canadian politician and former leader of the New Brunswick New Democratic Party.

== Early life and family ==
Thomason grew up in Tracy, New Brunswick until the age of 11 when his family moved to Alberta. He returned to New Brunswick upon acceptance to the University of New Brunswick.

Before becoming interim leader of the New Brunswick New Democratic Party, he worked for UPS and as a newspaper carrier in Fredericton. He is currently a bus driver in Fredericton.

== Political career ==
Thomason first became involved with politics during the 2015 Alberta general election where Rachel Notley's Alberta New Democratic Party won a majority government. He later volunteered with the federal New Democratic Party during the 2015 Canadian federal election in the Fredericton area.

During the 2018 New Brunswick general election, Thomason ran in New Maryland—Sunbury. He was named interim leader of the New Brunswick New Democratic Party in March 2019. In 2019 federal election, he ran as the NDP candidate in Fredericton. Thomason led the New Brunswick NDP into the 2020 provincial election, he unsuccessfully ran in Fredericton North and the NDP did not win any seats in the legislature.

Thomason had intended to only lead the party until a new leader was found. A leadership election that had been scheduled for August 2019 was postponed until June 2020 due to a lack of candidates and then was postponed again until April 2021 due to the COVID-19 pandemic. However, when Premier Blaine Higgs called a snap election for September 14, 2020, he led the party through the election campaign, saying beforehand that he was in "a little bit of panic" at the prospects of leading the party in an election campaign, saying, "It wasn't something I ever thought of when I first signed up for the job." Thomason positioned the party further to the left than in previous campaigns, in order to distinguish the party from the Green Party and the Liberals. He told CBC News: "I think it's really about making sure that we cement our values... A lot of this back and forth between centre and centre left, it's not working. It's not working for the party. It's not working for electoral chances. It's definitely not working for New Brunswickers."

He participated in the televised leaders' debate on September 3, 2020, saying that the province may have to continue to run deficits in order to ensure people had access “to the services they pay for.”

Thomason's campaign focussed on bringing in a $15/hour minimum wage, senior care, making prescription medicine affordable, as well as reducing and eventually eliminating tuition for post-secondary education.

In the 2020 New Brunswick general election, the NDP failed to win a seat, and received only 1.7% of the vote province-wide. Thomason resigned as interim leader on November 15, 2020.

Thomason reassumed the NDP leadership on September 14, 2021 when he was acclaimed as permanent leader. He resigned eight months later, due to internal turmoil.

== Electoral record ==
2020 New Brunswick general election: Fredericton North
Party	Candidate	Votes	%	±%
Progressive Conservative	Jill Green	3,226	41.12	+12.89
Green	Luke Randall	2,464	31.41	+14.42
Liberal	Stephen Horsman	1,464	18.66	-12.95
People's Alliance	Allen Price	591	7.53	-13.83
New Democratic	Mackenzie Thomason	100	1.27	-0.53
Total valid votes		7,845	100.0	
Total rejected ballots		42	0.53	
Turnout		7,887	67.87	
Eligible voters		11,620		
Progressive Conservative gain from Liberal		Swing		-0.77

2019 Canadian federal election: Fredericton
Party	Candidate	Votes	%	±%	Expenditures
Green	Jenica Atwin	16,640	33.68	+21.26	$55,541.51
Conservative	Andrea Johnson	15,011	30.38	+1.96	$81,269.70
Liberal	Matt DeCourcey	13,544	27.41	−21.85	$82,534.73
New Democratic	Mackenzie Thomason	2,946	5.96	−3.93	$1,197.20
People's	Jason Paull	776	1.57	New	$1,322.69
Animal Protection	Lesley Thomas	286	0.58	New	$2,894.40
Libertarian	Brandon Kirby	126	0.26	New	$965.26
Communist	Jacob Patterson	80	0.16	New	$476.56
Total valid votes/expense limit		49,409	99.39		$101,795.92
Total rejected ballots		301	0.61	+0.20	
Turnout		49,710	74.63	−1.10	
Eligible voters		66,606			
Green gain from Liberal		Swing		+9.65	
Source: Elections Canada

2018 New Brunswick general election: New Maryland-Sunbury
Party	Candidate	Votes	%	±%
Progressive Conservative	Jeff Carr	3,844	41.2	+0.25
People's Alliance	Morris Shannon	2,214	23.7	+23.7
Liberal	Alex Scholten	2,210	23.7	-7.64
Green	Jenica Atwin	902	9.7	+3.57
New Democratic	Mackenzie Thomason	143	1.5	-20.08
KISS	Danelle Titus	14	0.2	+0.2
Progressive Conservative hold		Swing		{{{3}}}
Source: Elections NB
