= Wes McLean =

Canadian politician

MLA for Victoria-Tobique
- In office October 12, 2010 – 2014
- Preceded by: Larry Kennedy
- Succeeded by: riding dissolved

Personal details
- Born: 1981 or 1982 (age 44–45)
- Party: Progressive Conservative

Wes McLean is a former Canadian politician, who was elected to the Legislative Assembly of New Brunswick in the 2010 provincial election. He represented the electoral district of Victoria-Tobique as a member of the Progressive Conservatives until the 2014 provincial election, when he did not run for re-election.

Before becoming an MLA, he worked as political staffer in New Brunswick and Ottawa, including the offices of Prime Minister Stephen Harper and Senate Leader Marjory LeBreton.

During his term, he served as deputy house leader of the Progressive Conservative caucus, and parliamentary secretary to the premier. He was stripped of his responsibilities following an impaired driving charge, to which he pleaded guilty, in May 2013.
