= Jennifer McKenzie (politician) =

Canadian politician

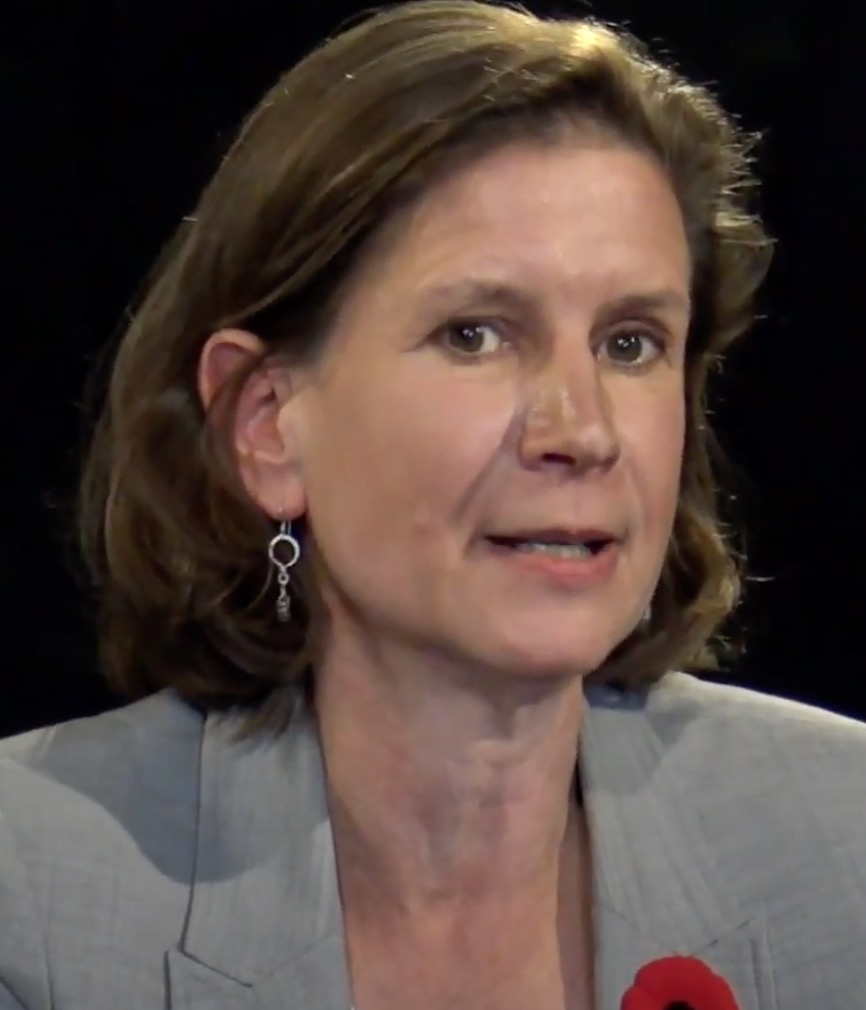

Leader of the New Brunswick New Democratic Party
- In office August 10, 2017 – February 25, 2019
- Preceded by: Rosaire L'Italien
- Succeeded by: Mackenzie Thomason (interim)

Personal details
- Born: Fredericton, New Brunswick
- Party: New Brunswick New Democratic Party; New Democratic Party
- Occupation: Engineer

Jennifer McKenzie (born 1962) is a Canadian politician and former leader of the New Brunswick New Democratic Party. She was acclaimed as leader on August 10, 2017. On February 25, 2019, a day after losing a leadership review on whether or not a new leadership election should be held within six months, she resigned as leader rather than run as a leadership candidate.

McKenzie had previously served as chair of the Ottawa-Carleton District School Board for two terms.

She is an engineer by training and a tech entrepreneur who formerly served as vice-president of Instantel Inc, a technology manufacturer. McKenzie was born in Fredericton, New Brunswick and moved to Ontario to pursue her career before returning to New Brunswick. She lives in Saint John, New Brunswick. McKenzie has three adult children.

McKenzie was a candidate for the New Democratic Party in Fundy Royal for the 2015 federal election placing third with 18% of the vote. Previously, she was also a candidate for the Ontario New Democratic Party in Ottawa Centre in the 2014 Ontario provincial election finishing second with 20% of the vote.

McKenzie led the NDP during the 2018 provincial election. The party failed to win any seats and McKenzie ran third in her district of Saint John Harbour.

== Electoral record ==
2018 New Brunswick general election: Saint John Harbour
Party	Candidate	Votes	%	±%
Liberal	Gerry Lowe	1,865	32.9%	
Progressive Conservative	Barry Ogden	1,855	32.7%	
New Democratic	Jennifer McKenzie	836	14.7%	
Green	Wayne Dryer	721	12.7%	
People's Alliance	Margot Brideau	393	6.9%	
Total valid votes			100.0	
Total rejected ballots				
Turnout				
Eligible voters				

2015 Canadian federal election: Fundy Royal
Party	Candidate	Votes	%	±%	Expenditures
Liberal	Alaina Lockhart	19,136	40.87	+30.44	$44,760.36
Conservative	Rob Moore	17,361	37.09	−20.88	$94,342.23
New Democratic	Jennifer McKenzie	8,204	17.52	−9.34	$48,770.66
Green	Stephanie Coburn	1,823	3.89	−0.83	$1,469.99
Independent	David Raymond Amos	296	0.63	–	–
Total valid votes/expense limit		46,820	100.0		$204,844.46
Total rejected ballots		241	0.51		
Turnout		47,061	75.04		
Eligible voters		62,713			
Liberal gain from Conservative		Swing		+25.66	
Source(s): "Fundy Royal". Election Results. Elections Canada.; Elections Canada – Preliminary Election Expenses Limits for Candidates

2014 Ontario general election: Ottawa Centre
Party	Candidate	Votes	%	±%
Liberal	Yasir Naqvi	27,689	52.02	+4.86
New Democratic	Jennifer McKenzie	10,894	20.47	−8.74
Progressive Conservative	Rob Dekker	9,678	18.18	−0.21
Green	Kevin O'Donnell	4,163	7.82	+3.42
Libertarian	Bruce A. Faulkner	525	0.99	+1.08
Communist	Larry L. Wasslen	283	0.53	+0.21
Total valid votes		53,232	100.0	+5.74
Liberal hold		Swing		+6.80
Source(s) "Election Night Results – General Election Results by District – 062, Ottawa Centre – Unofficial". Elections Ontario.

Ottawa-Carleton District School Board election, 2010: Zone 10
Candidate	Vote	%
Jennifer McKenzie (X)	11,828	75.10
Megan Carroll	3,921	24.90

Ottawa-Carleton District School Board election, 2006: Zone 10
Candidate	Votes	%
Jennifer McKenzie	9,198	54.38
Joan Spice (X)	7,716	45.62
