= 2005 New Brunswick New Democratic Party leadership election =

- Date: September 25, 2005
- Convention: Fredericton
- Resigning leader: Elizabeth Weir
- Won by: Allison Brewer
- Ballots: 1
- Candidates: 3

The New Brunswick New Democratic Party, a social democratic political party in the Canadian province of New Brunswick, held a leadership election in 2005, following the resignation of previous leader Elizabeth Weir on October 8, 2004. The convention was held in Fredericton from September 23–25, 2005 with the vote for leader to be held on September 25, though all members were eligible to vote by mail.

== Candidates ==
The particulars for the convention were determined on January 15, and the original deadline for candidates to enter the race was June 23, 2005. However, on July 4 the party announced the deadline had been extended to July 12.

- Allison Brewer, a social activist and former director of the Morgentaler abortion clinic in Fredericton makes her candidacy known on May 14. She officially launched her campaign on May 24.
- Pam Coates, national anti-poverty activist and provincial NDP candidate in Saint John Portland in 1999 taking third place and 13% of the vote. She announced her candidacy on July 12.
- Oscar Doucet, provincial NDP candidate in Rogersville-Kouchibouguac in 2003 taking third place and 6% of the vote. He announced his candidacy on July 11.

== Results ==
A candidate was required to win a majority of votes, had no candidate won an absolute majority on the first round of voting, the second preferences of the third placed candidated would have been counted to determine a leader. This was not necessary however as Allison Brewer won on the first round of balloting.

Candidate	Votes	
Candidate	#	%
Allison Brewer	248	62.5%
Oscar Doucet	96	24.2%
Pam Coates	47	11.8%
Spoiled ballots	6	1.5%
Total	397	100.0%

== Declined ==
The following potential candidates, widely suggested by media following Weir's resignation, announced that they would not run for the leadership:

- Yvon Godin, NDP Member of Parliament for Acadie-Bathurst
- Gilles Halley, provincial NDP candidate in Nepisiguit in 1999 taking third place and 28% of the vote, announced that he could run "maybe next time" but could not run at this time due to ongoing business ventures
- Tom Mann, president of the New Brunswick Public Employees Union

The New Brunswick Telegraph-Journal reported on May 25 that the following individuals were considering a run. Neither of them ever denied this publicly, but the deadline to enter the race passed without their entry.

- Dennis Atchison, provincial NDP candidate in Fredericton North in 2003 taking third place and 16% of the vote.
- John Carty, federal NDP candidate in Fredericton in 2004 taking third place and 17% of the vote.

== Timeline ==
- October 8, 2004 - Elizabeth Weir resigns from the leadership of the NDP, a post she has held since 1988. Weir will stay on as leader until her successor is chosen.
- January 15, 2005 - The NDP's Provincial Council meets in Moncton and decides to delay the vote from spring to fall.
- March 23, 2005 - The NDP announces the date of its convention and the rules for the conduct thereof.
- May 14, 2005 - Allison Brewer becomes the first candidate to announce for leader.
- June 23, 2005 - The deadline for candidates to enter the race passes and, as the only candidate, Allison Brewer becomes the leader-designate of the New Brunswick NDP.
- June 28, 2005 - NDP president Terry Albright announces that the NDP's Provincial Council is considering a request to extend the deadline for candidates to enter the race to July 12 at the request of a potential candidate. Brewer states that she would not oppose such an extension.
- July 4, 2005 - Albright announces that the deadline has been extended to July 12 to accommodate an individual who had planned to run but who could not make the deadline due to personal issues. Albright says that in addition to this candidate, it is expected that a third candidate may now enter the race.
- July 11, 2005 - Oscar Doucet becomes the second candidate in the race.
- July 12, 2005 - Pam Coates becomes the third and final candidate in the race.
- August 26, 2005 - Brewer reveals that she was arrested earlier in the month for unpaid parking tickets, she was released after paying a $100 fine but protests having been arrested as an unnecessary action.
- August 28, 2005 - The three candidates participate in the first of two debates in the campaign in Bathurst
- September 11, 2005 - The three candidates participate in the second of two debates in Moncton.
- September 25, 2005 - Allison Brewer wins the leadership on the first ballot with approximately 60% of the vote.

== See also ==
- 1988 New Brunswick New Democratic Party leadership election
- 2007 New Brunswick New Democratic Party leadership election
- 2011 New Brunswick New Democratic Party leadership election
- 2017 New Brunswick New Democratic Party leadership election
- 2021 New Brunswick New Democratic Party leadership election
