= Larry Kennedy (politician) =

Canadian politician (1949–2026)

Larry Ronald Kennedy

MLA for Victoria-Tobique
- In office 1987–2010
- Preceded by: Doug Moore
- Succeeded by: Wes McLean

Personal details
- Born: November 8, 1949 Perth-Andover, New Brunswick, Canada
- Died: March 24, 2026 (aged 76) Southern Victoria, New Brunswick, Canada
- Resting place: St. Mary of the Angels Roman Catholic Cemetery, Southern Victoria, New Brunswick
- Party: Liberal
- Occupation: Family physician, politician

Larry Ronald Kennedy (November 8, 1949 – March 24, 2026) was a Canadian politician in the province of New Brunswick.

== Life and career ==
Kennedy studied at the University of New Brunswick in Fredericton where he earned a Bachelor of Science before going on to earn his Doctor of Medicine degree from Dalhousie University in Halifax, Nova Scotia.

He served as a village councillor for Perth-Andover and was chairman of the District 31 School Board. During his time as a practising physician in his hometown area, he was chief and president of the medical staff at Hotel-Dieu Saint-Joseph, and a director of the New Brunswick Medical Society.

Kennedy was elected to the Legislative Assembly of New Brunswick in 1987 and re-elected in 1991, 1995, a 1997 by-election, 1999, 2003 and 2006. He was Dean of the House from 2006 to 2010.

He represented the electoral district of Victoria-Tobique until his defeat in the 2010 election and also practiced medicine as a family physician.

Kennedy died in his hometown of Southern Victoria, New Brunswick, on March 24, 2026, at the age of 76.

== Sources ==
- Larry Kennedy, M.D. MLA, Victoria-Tobique. Legislative Assembly of New Brunswick. Accessed 2011-02-24.
- Dr. Larry Kennedy obituary. Brunswick Funeral Home. Accessed 2026-03-27.
