= Saint John South =

Defunct provincial electoral district in New Brunswick, Canada

New Brunswick electoral district

Defunct provincial electoral district
- Legislature: Legislative Assembly of New Brunswick
- District created: 1973
- District abolished: 1994
- First contested: 1974
- Last contested: 1991

Saint John South was a provincial electoral district in New Brunswick. It was created from the multi-member riding of Saint John Centre in the 1973 electoral redistribution, and was abolished in the 1994 electoral redistribution.

== Members of the Legislative Assembly ==
Assembly	Years	Member	Party
Riding created from Saint John Centre
48th	1974–1978	John Mooney	Liberal
49th	1978–1982	Nancy Teed	Progressive Conservative
50th	1982–1987	Nancy Teed	Progressive Conservative
51st	1987–1991	John Mooney	Liberal
52nd	1991–1995	Elizabeth Weir	New Democratic
Riding dissolved into Saint John Harbour

== Election results ==
1991 New Brunswick general election
Party	Candidate	Votes	%	±%
New Democratic	Elizabeth Weir	1,675	38.65	+7.34
Liberal	John Mooney	1,596	36.83	-6.81
Confederation of Regions	Ray McDevitt	549	12.67	–
Progressive Conservative	Paddy Addison	514	11.86	-13.19
Total valid votes		4,334	100.0	
New Democratic gain from Liberal		Swing		+7.08

1987 New Brunswick general election
Party	Candidate	Votes	%	±%
Liberal	John Mooney	1,974	43.64	+9.25
New Democratic	David Brown	1,416	31.31	+8.43
Progressive Conservative	Nancy Teed	1,133	25.05	-17.68
Total valid votes		4,523	100.0	
Liberal gain from Progressive Conservative		Swing		+0.41

1982 New Brunswick general election
Party	Candidate	Votes	%	±%
Progressive Conservative	Nancy Clark Teed	1,890	42.73	-2.56
Liberal	Brian McCarthy	1,521	34.39	-8.70
New Democratic	David Brown	1,012	22.88	+11.26
Total valid votes		4,423	100.0	
Progressive Conservative hold		Swing		+3.07

1978 New Brunswick general election
Party	Candidate	Votes	%	±%
Progressive Conservative	Nancy Clark	1,622	45.29	+1.73
Liberal	John P. Mooney	1,543	43.09	-9.19
New Democratic	David M. Brown	416	11.62	+7.45
Total valid votes		3,581	100.0	
Progressive Conservative gain from Liberal		Swing		+5.46

1974 New Brunswick general election
Party	Candidate	Votes	%
Liberal	John Mooney	2,799	52.28
Progressive Conservative	Lorne McGuigan	2,332	43.56
New Democratic	Verla Hayes	223	4.17
Total valid votes		5,354	100.0
The previous multi-member riding of Saint John Centre elected three Progressive Conservatives and one Liberal in the previous election, one of the PC seats was won by a Liberal in a by-election. Lorne McGuigan was one of four incumbents.

== See also ==
- List of New Brunswick provincial electoral districts
- Canadian provincial electoral districts
