= Rosaire L'Italien =

Canadian journalist

Leader of the New Brunswick New Democratic Party Interim
- In office January 9, 2017 – August 10, 2017
- Preceded by: Dominic Cardy
- Succeeded by: Jennifer McKenzie

Personal details
- Party: New Brunswick New Democratic Party, New Democratic Party
- Occupation: Journalist

Rosaire L'Italien was the interim leader of the New Brunswick New Democratic Party in 2017. Previously, he had been a journalist for Radio-Canada-owned station CBAFT-DT in Moncton for 42 years, covering New Brunswick and Atlantic Canada before retiring in 2015. In the 2015 federal election, he was the New Democratic Party's candidate in Madawaska—Restigouche where he placed second, ahead of incumbent Conservative MP Bernard Valcourt. On January 9, 2017, he was appointed interim leader of the provincial party by the party's executive following the resignation of Dominic Cardy. He remained leader until August 10, 2017, when Jennifer McKenzie was chosen as the new NDP leader.

== Electoral record ==
2015 Canadian federal election: Madawaska—Restigouche
Party	Candidate	Votes	%	±%	Expenditures
Liberal	René Arseneault	20,778	55.70	+20.91	$66,315.47
New Democratic	Rosaire L'Italien	9,670	25.92	+6.58	$92,730.82
Conservative	Bernard Valcourt	6,151	16.49	-23.99	$101,364.85
Green	Françoise Aubin	707	1.90	+0.10	–
Total valid votes/expense limit		37,306	99.08		$199,271.58
Total rejected ballots		348	0.92	–	
Turnout		37,654	74.02	–	
Eligible voters		50,871			
Liberal gain from Conservative		Swing		+22.45	
Source: Elections Canada
