= 2010 New Brunswick general election =

Canadian provincial election

- September 27, 2010

55 seats of the Legislative Assembly of New Brunswick 28 seats needed for a majority
- Turnout: 69.56%
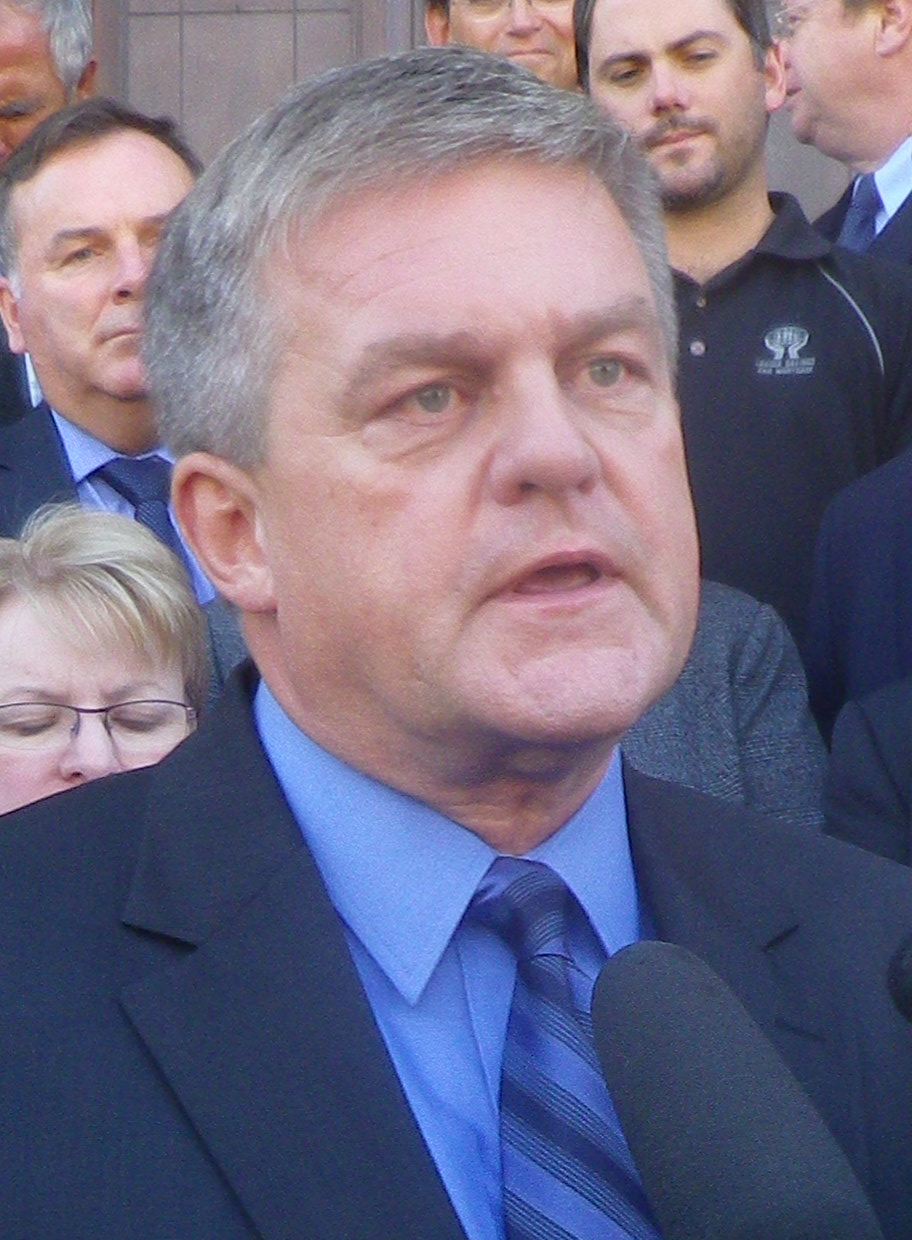

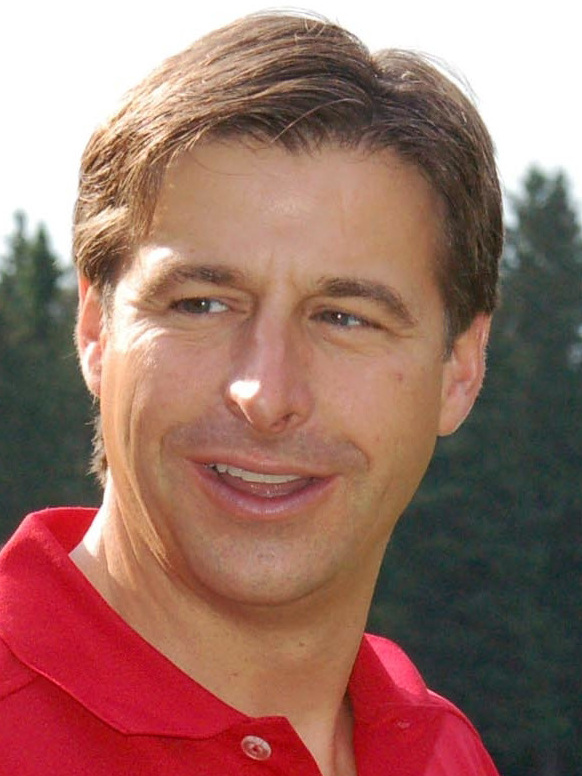
| | First party | Second party | Third party |
|---|---|---|---|
| | | | NDP |
| Leader | David Alward | Shawn Graham | Roger Duguay |
| Party | Progressive Conservative | Liberal | New Democratic |
| Leader since | October 18, 2008 | May 11, 2002 | October 13, 2007 |
| Leader's seat | Woodstock | Kent | Ran in Tracadie-Sheila (lost) |
| Last election | 26 seats, 47.5% | 29 seats, 47.1% | 0 seats, 5.1% |
| Seats before | 21 | 32 | 0 |
| Seats won | 42 | 13 | 0 |
| Seat change | ▲21 | ▼19 | Steady |
| Popular vote | 181,776 | 128,113 | 38,737 |
| Percentage | 48.84% | 34.42% | 10.41% |
| Swing | ▲1.34pp | ▼12.68pp | ▲5.26pp |
- Popular vote by riding. As this is an FPTP election, seat totals are not determined by popular vote, but instead via results by each riding.
Premier before election
Shawn Graham
Liberals
Premier after election
David Alward
Progressive Conservatives

The 2010 New Brunswick general election was held on September 27, 2010, to elect 55 members to the 57th New Brunswick Legislative Assembly, the governing house of the province of New Brunswick, Canada. The incumbent Liberal government won 13 seats, while the opposition Progressive Conservatives won a landslide majority of 42 seats in the legislature. As leader of the PC party, David Alward became New Brunswick's 32nd premier.

The Lieutenant-Governor of New Brunswick – acting on the advice of the Premier – would have originally been able to call an election earlier or as late as 2011; however a bill in the 56th Legislature has fixed election dates to the fourth Monday of September every four years beginning with this election.

With the defeat of Liberals, this election marked the first time in New Brunswick's history that a political party was voted out of office after just one term.

== Timeline ==
=== 2006 ===
- October 10, 2006 – Organizers for the Green Party of Canada in New Brunswick announce plans to form a provincial Green Party in time to field a full slate of candidates in this election.
- November 5, 2006 – Allison Brewer resigns as leader of the New Democratic Party. She will be replaced on an interim basis by Pat Hanratty and permanently upon the election of a new leader in late 2007.
- December 12, 2006 – An opinion poll conducted November 10 to December 7 by Corporate Research Associates showed the Liberals enjoying an unprecedented lead in opinion polls, standing at 65% in contrast to 27% for the Progressive Conservatives, 6% for the New Democrats and 2% for the Greens.
- December 13, 2006 – Bernard Lord resigns as leader of the Progressive Conservatives and announces he will resign his seat in the legislature on January 31, 2007.

=== 2007 ===
- March 5, 2007 – Liberal Chris Collins wins Lord's former seat in Moncton East changing the standings in the legislature to 30 Liberals, 25 Progressive Conservatives.
- April 17, 2007 – Progressive Conservatives Joan MacAlpine-Stiles and Wally Stiles cross the floor and join the Liberals changing the standings in the legislature to Liberals 32, Progressive Conservatives 23.
- May 29, 2007 – Government House Leader Stuart Jamieson tables Bill 75 which would fix election dates to the fourth Monday of September every four years beginning on September 27 in 2010.
- October 13, 2007 – The NDP elect Roger Duguay as their new leader.

=== 2008 ===
- May 17, 2008 – The Green Party of New Brunswick is formed. Mike Milligan is elected as the interim leader of the party until a convention can be held in the fall.
- October 18, 2008 – David Alward is elected as leader of the Progressive Conservative Party.
- November 3, 2008 – Progressive Conservative Jack Carr holds a seat previously held by fellow Progressive Conservative Keith Ashfield who was elected as Conservative MP for Fredericton restoring the standings in the legislature to 32 Liberals, 23 Progressive Conservatives.

=== 2009 ===
- March 9, 2009 – Liberal Burt Paulin wins a seat previously held by Progressive Conservative Percy Mockler changing the standings in the legislature to 33 Liberals, 22 Progressive Conservatives.
- December 25, 2009 – Premier Shawn Graham "says he's ready to fight the next election on his controversial plan to sell NB Power to Hydro-Québec."

=== 2010 ===
- January 4, 2010 – Justice Minister Michael Murphy unexpectedly resigns his seat to "spend more time with his family and return to practising law".
- February 5, 2010 – Cabinet Minister Stuart Jamieson is forced to leave his cabinet post for suggesting that the NB power deal be put to a referendum.
- March 24, 2010 – Premier Shawn Graham announces that the proposed sale of NB Power has been canceled.
- May 10, 2010 – Premier Shawn Graham shuffles the New Brunswick cabinet. Bernard LeBlanc is reinstated as minister of justice, and also named the first minister responsible for public engagement. Brian Kenny is promoted to the tourism portfolio. Cheryl Lavoie enters cabinet as minister of state for seniors. Donald Arseneault gains title of deputy premier.
- May 19, 2010 – Progressive Conservatives release Vision for Citizen Engagement and Responsible Government, a pre-campaign document that outlines the PC strategy to improve citizen engagement.
- June 9, 2010 – People's Alliance officially forms the newest N.B. political party under the leadership of former Tory Kris Austin.
- September 27, 2010 – David Alward is elected into office as Premier of New Brunswick.

== Results ==
Summary of the 2010 Legislative Assembly of New Brunswick election
| Party | Leader | Candidates | Votes | | | | Seats | | |
| Party | Leader | Candidates | # | ± | % | Change (pp) | 2006 | 2010 | ± |
|---|---|---|---|---|---|---|---|---|---|
| Progressive Conservative | David Alward | 55 | 181,397 | 3,815▼ | 48.80 | 1.33 | 26 | 42 / 55 | 16▲ |
| Liberal | Shawn Graham | 55 | 128,078 | 48,365▼ | 34.45 | -12.70 | 29 | 13 / 55 | 16▼ |
| New Democratic | Roger Duguay | 55 | 38,686 | 19,490▲ | 10.41 | 5.28 | | | |
| Green | Jack MacDougall | 49 | 16,943 | 16,943▲ | 4.56 | 4.56 | | | |
| People's Alliance | Kris Austin | 14 | 4,363 | 4,363▲ | 1.17 | 1.17 | | | |
| Independent | | 7 | 2,275 | 1,340▲ | 0.61 | 0.36 | | | |
| Total | | 235 | 371,742 | | 100.00% | | | | |
| Rejected ballots | | | 3,160 | 69▲ | | | | | |
| Turnout | | | 374,902 | 2,345▼ | 69.56% | 2.04▲ | | | |
| Registered voters | | | 538,965 | 19,723▼ | | | | | |

= New party

=== Synopsis of results ===
2010 New Brunswick general election – synopsis of riding results
| Riding | Winning party | | | | | | | Turnout | Votes | | | | | | |
| Riding | 2006 | 1st place | Votes | Share | Margin # | Margin % | 2nd place | Turnout | PC | Lib | NDP | Green | PA | Ind | Total |
|---|---|---|---|---|---|---|---|---|---|---|---|---|---|---|---|
| Albert | PC | PC | 3,985 | 62.28% | 2,712 | 42.38% | Lib | 67.46% | 3,985 | 1,273 | 409 | 448 | 284 | – | 6,399 |
| Bathurst | Lib | Lib | 2,899 | 44.99% | 78 | 1.21% | PC | 69.55% | 2,821 | 2,899 | 620 | 104 | – | – | 6,444 |
| Campbellton-Restigouche Centre | Lib | PC | 3,914 | 54.92% | 1,461 | 20.50% | Lib | 73.94% | 3,914 | 2,453 | 524 | 236 | – | – | 7,127 |
| Caraquet | Lib | Lib | 3,661 | 50.08% | 620 | 8.48% | PC | 81.26% | 3,041 | 3,661 | 406 | 202 | – | – | 7,310 |
| Carleton | PC | PC | 3,885 | 61.76% | 2,176 | 34.59% | Lib | 69.75% | 3,885 | 1,709 | 316 | 380 | – | – | 6,290 |
| Centre-Péninsule-Saint-Sauveur | Lib | Lib | 4,652 | 63.87% | 3,168 | 43.49% | PC | 79.43% | 1,484 | 4,652 | 1,148 | – | – | – | 7,284 |
| Charlotte-Campobello | PC | PC | 2,977 | 48.09% | 1,461 | 23.60% | Lib | 68.61% | 2,977 | 1,516 | 798 | 498 | 401 | – | 6,190 |
| Charlotte-The Isles | Lib | Lib | 3,176 | 51.36% | 892 | 14.42% | PC | 70.81% | 2,284 | 3,176 | 303 | 174 | 247 | – | 6,184 |
| Dalhousie-Restigouche East | Lib | Lib | 3,634 | 46.34% | 1,005 | 12.82% | PC | 76.90% | 2,629 | 3,634 | 1,406 | 173 | – | – | 7,842 |
| Dieppe Centre-Lewisville | PC | Lib | 4,542 | 46.28% | 1,116 | 11.37% | PC | 68.39% | 3,426 | 4,542 | 1,152 | 694 | – | – | 9,814 |
| Edmundston-Saint-Basile | PC | PC | 5,551 | 75.89% | 4,192 | 57.31% | Lib | 69.85% | 5,551 | 1,359 | 223 | 182 | – | – | 7,315 |
| Fredericton-Fort Nashwaak | Lib | PC | 3,582 | 47.29% | 1,006 | 13.28% | Lib | 65.61% | 3,582 | 2,576 | 866 | 550 | – | – | 7,574 |
| Fredericton-Lincoln | Lib | PC | 2,713 | 39.60% | 249 | 3.63% | Lib | 64.97% | 2,713 | 2,464 | 1,009 | 665 | – | – | 6,851 |
| Fredericton-Nashwaaksis | Lib | PC | 3,720 | 47.56% | 960 | 12.27% | Lib | 69.93% | 3,720 | 2,760 | 601 | 741 | – | – | 7,822 |
| Fredericton-Silverwood | Lib | PC | 2,955 | 38.50% | 448 | 5.84% | Lib | 67.39% | 2,955 | 2,507 | 1,234 | 912 | – | 67 | 7,675 |
| Fundy-River Valley | Lib | PC | 3,629 | 57.52% | 1,814 | 28.75% | Lib | 68.38% | 3,629 | 1,815 | 427 | 221 | 217 | – | 6,309 |
| Grand Falls-Drummond-Saint-André | Lib | PC | 3,057 | 49.16% | 347 | 5.58% | Lib | 73.38% | 3,057 | 2,710 | 292 | 159 | – | – | 6,218 |
| Grand Lake-Gagetown | Lib | PC | 3,190 | 44.73% | 1,072 | 15.03% | Lib | 77.73% | 3,190 | 2,118 | 234 | 174 | 1,416 | – | 7,132 |
| Hampton-Kings | PC | PC | 4,302 | 57.49% | 2,634 | 35.20% | Lib | 68.66% | 4,302 | 1,668 | 1,193 | 320 | – | – | 7,483 |
| Kent | Lib | Lib | 3,817 | 55.35% | 1,995 | 28.93% | PC | 77.54% | 1,822 | 3,817 | 1,040 | 217 | – | – | 6,896 |
| Kent South | PC | PC | 5,054 | 60.37% | 2,607 | 31.14% | Lib | 78.26% | 5,054 | 2,447 | 499 | 372 | – | – | 8,372 |
| Kings East | PC | PC | 4,470 | 66.74% | 3,055 | 45.61% | Lib | 67.37% | 4,470 | 1,415 | 487 | 326 | – | – | 6,698 |
| Lamèque-Shippagan-Miscou | PC | PC | 4,270 | 58.89% | 1,971 | 27.18% | Lib | 80.94% | 4,270 | 2,299 | 682 | – | – | – | 7,251 |
| Madawaska-les-Lacs | PC | PC | 3,378 | 54.17% | 1,393 | 22.34% | Lib | 70.88% | 3,378 | 1,985 | 229 | – | – | 644 | 6,236 |
| Memramcook-Lakeville-Dieppe | Lib | Lib | 3,423 | 50.82% | 1,252 | 18.59% | PC | 69.63% | 2,171 | 3,423 | 708 | 433 | – | – | 6,735 |
| Miramichi Bay-Neguac | Lib | PC | 2,908 | 42.71% | 363 | 5.33% | Lib | 76.89% | 2,908 | 2,545 | 1,131 | 92 | 132 | – | 6,808 |
| Miramichi Centre | Lib | PC | 3,183 | 48.08% | 622 | 9.40% | Lib | 74.29% | 3,183 | 2,561 | 379 | 174 | 323 | – | 6,620 |
| Miramichi-Bay du Vin | Lib | Lib | 3,290 | 49.65% | 676 | 10.20% | PC | 75.41% | 2,614 | 3,290 | 507 | 215 | – | – | 6,626 |
| Moncton East | PC | Lib | 2,641 | 41.58% | 179 | 2.82% | PC | 59.80% | 2,462 | 2,641 | 650 | 599 | – | – | 6,352 |
| Moncton North | Lib | PC | 2,349 | 44.95% | 439 | 8.40% | Lib | 55.47% | 2,349 | 1,910 | 511 | 365 | 91 | – | 5,226 |
| Moncton West | PC | PC | 2,981 | 48.52% | 975 | 15.87% | Lib | 61.54% | 2,981 | 2,006 | 576 | 503 | – | 78 | 6,144 |
| Moncton Crescent | PC | PC | 4,168 | 50.56% | 1,628 | 19.75% | Lib | 61.36% | 4,168 | 2,540 | 806 | 729 | – | – | 8,243 |
| Nepisiguit | Lib | PC | 2,454 | 41.03% | 510 | 8.53% | Lib | 71.76% | 2,454 | 1,944 | 1,474 | 109 | – | – | 5,981 |
| New Maryland-Sunbury West | PC | PC | 4,099 | 63.60% | 2,591 | 40.20% | Lib | 72.25% | 4,099 | 1,508 | 549 | 289 | – | – | 6,445 |
| Nigadoo-Chaleur | Lib | Lib | 3,649 | 49.77% | 851 | 11.61% | PC | 73.38% | 2,798 | 3,649 | 706 | 179 | – | – | 7,332 |
| Oromocto | PC | PC | 3,660 | 81.21% | 3,093 | 68.63% | Lib | 58.78% | 3,660 | 567 | 280 | – | – | – | 4,507 |
| Petitcodiac | PC | PC | 4,133 | 55.69% | 2,361 | 31.81% | Lib | 68.40% | 4,133 | 1,772 | 661 | 856 | – | – | 7,422 |
| Quispamsis | Lib | PC | 4,076 | 50.67% | 1,324 | 16.46% | Lib | 69.29% | 4,076 | 2,752 | 918 | 298 | – | – | 8,044 |
| Restigouche-La-Vallée | PC | PC | 3,727 | 53.49% | 1,238 | 17.77% | Lib | 75.45% | 3,727 | 2,489 | 550 | 202 | – | – | 6,968 |
| Riverview | PC | PC | 4,358 | 62.88% | 2,731 | 39.40% | Lib | 65.15% | 4,358 | 1,627 | 458 | 488 | – | – | 6,931 |
| Rogersville-Kouchibouguac | PC | Lib | 3,438 | 46.04% | 269 | 3.60% | PC | 82.83% | 3,169 | 3,438 | 860 | – | – | – | 7,467 |
| Rothesay | PC | PC | 3,372 | 56.64% | 1,682 | 28.25% | Lib | 67.21% | 3,372 | 1,690 | 534 | 357 | – | – | 5,953 |
| Saint John East | Lib | PC | 2,135 | 37.86% | 269 | 4.77% | Lib | 54.66% | 2,135 | 1,866 | 1,335 | 303 | – | – | 5,639 |
| Saint John Harbour | Lib | PC | 1,333 | 30.68% | 7 | 0.16% | Lib | 49.94% | 1,333 | 1,326 | 1,203 | 236 | – | 247 | 4,345 |
| Saint John Lancaster | Lib | PC | 3,429 | 50.75% | 1,143 | 16.92% | Lib | 66.74% | 3,429 | 2,286 | 688 | 246 | 108 | – | 6,757 |
| Saint John Portland | PC | PC | 2,925 | 50.18% | 863 | 14.81% | Lib | 62.31% | 2,925 | 2,062 | 573 | 189 | 80 | – | 5,829 |
| Saint John-Fundy | Lib | PC | 2,908 | 52.02% | 1,174 | 21.00% | Lib | 57.62% | 2,908 | 1,734 | 592 | 185 | 171 | – | 5,590 |
| Shediac-Cap-Pelé | Lib | Lib | 5,243 | 61.36% | 3,123 | 36.55% | PC | 73.48% | 2,120 | 5,243 | 668 | 409 | – | 104 | 8,544 |
| Southwest Miramichi | Lib | PC | 3,786 | 58.57% | 1,835 | 28.39% | Lib | 75.61% | 3,786 | 1,951 | 201 | 203 | 323 | – | 6,464 |
| Tantramar | PC | PC | 2,707 | 56.68% | 1,801 | 37.71% | Lib | 66.29% | 2,707 | 906 | 511 | 652 | – | – | 4,776 |
| Tracadie-Sheila | PC | PC | 3,806 | 48.83% | 1,295 | 16.61% | NDP | 83.10% | 3,806 | 1,478 | 2,511 | – | – | – | 7,795 |
| Victoria-Tobique | Lib | PC | 2,687 | 52.85% | 647 | 12.73% | Lib | 68.16% | 2,687 | 2,040 | 97 | 120 | – | 140 | 5,084 |
| Woodstock | PC | PC | 4,672 | 67.31% | 3,677 | 52.98% | Ind | 68.67% | 4,672 | 709 | 278 | 102 | 185 | 995 | 6,941 |
| York | PC | PC | 3,576 | 56.18% | 2,143 | 33.67% | Lib | 71.69% | 3,576 | 1,433 | 998 | 358 | – | – | 6,365 |
| York North | PC | PC | 4,492 | 63.33% | 3,255 | 45.89% | Lib | 69.31% | 4,492 | 1,237 | 675 | 304 | 385 | – | 7,093 |

= Open seat
= Turnout is above provincial average
= Winning candidate was in previous Legislature
= Incumbent had switched allegiance
= Previously incumbent in another riding
= Not incumbent; was previously elected to the Legislature
= Incumbency arose from byelection gain
= Other incumbents renominated
= Previously an MP in the House of Commons of Canada
= Multiple candidates

=== Results by region ===
| Party Name | | Central | North East | North West | South East | South West | Total |
|---|---|---|---|---|---|---|---|
| Progressive; Conservative | Seats | 9 | 7 | 7 | 8 | 11 | 42 |
| Progressive; Conservative | Popular Vote | 52.26% | 43.93% | 59.76% | 45.24% | 50.41% | 48.84% |
| Liberal | Seats | 0 | 6 | 0 | 6 | 1 | 13 |
| Liberal | Popular Vote | 27.72% | 40.52% | 28.86% | 37.78% | 31.04% | 34.42% |
| New Democratic | Seats | 0 | 0 | 0 | 0 | 0 | 0 |
| New Democratic | Popular Vote | 10.48% | 12.88% | 4.45% | 9.58% | 12.07% | 10.41% |
| Green | Seats | 0 | 0 | 0 | 0 | 0 | 0 |
| Green | Popular Vote | 6.46% | 1.81% | 2.56% | 6.83% | 4.50% | 4.54% |
| People's Alliance | Seats | 0 | 0 | 0 | 0 | 0 | 0 |
| People's Alliance | Popular Vote | 2.97% | 0.86% | 0.41% | 0.38% | 1.65% | 1.18% |
| Independent | Seats | 0 | 0 | 0 | 0 | 0 | 0 |
| Independent | Popular Vote | 0.11% | 0.00% | 3.95% | 0.19% | 0.34% | 0.61% |
| Total seats | | 9 | 13 | 7 | 14 | 12 | 55 |

=== Results by place ===
Candidates ranked 1st to 5th place, by party
| Parties | 1st | 2nd | 3rd | 4th | 5th |
|---|---|---|---|---|---|
| █ Progressive Conservative | 42 | 13 | | | |
| █ Liberal | 13 | 40 | 2 | | |
| █ New Democratic | | 1 | 43 | 9 | 2 |
| █ Independent | | 1 | 2 | 1 | 3 |
| █ Green | | | 6 | 36 | 6 |
| █ People's Alliance | | | 2 | 4 | 8 |

== Target ridings ==
The following is a list of ridings which were narrowly lost by the indicated party. For instance, under the Liberal column are the 10 seats in which they came closest to winning from the Conservatives, while under the Conservative column are the 10 seats in which they came closest to winning from the Liberals. Listed is the name of the riding, and the margin, in terms of percentage of the vote, by which the party lost.

These ridings are likely to be targeted by the specified party because the party lost them by a very slim margin in the 2006 election.

Up to 10 are shown, with a maximum margin of victory of 15%. No party or independent candidate, other than the Liberals or Progressive Conservatives, came within 15% of winning any seats.

* Indicates incumbent not running again.

To clarify further; this is a list of provincial general election winners with their party in parentheses, and their margin as a percentage of the vote over the party whose list the seat is on (not the same as the margin of victory if the party potentially "targeting" the seat in that list did not finish second in the previous election). "Won" means that the targeting party won the seat from the incumbent party. "Held" means the incumbent party held the seat.

| Liberal | Progressive Conservative |
| 1. Dieppe Centre-Lewisville 0.7%* (won); 2. Rothesay 1.5% (held); 3. York 2.4% (held); 4. Charlotte-Campobello 4.4%* (held); 5. Saint John Portland 4.6% (held); 6. Moncton West 4.8%* (won by PCs); 7. New Maryland-Sunbury West 9.0% (held); 8. Tracadie-Sheila 10.1% (held); 9. Moncton Crescent 12.9% (held); 10. Woodstock 13.0% (held) | 1. Fredericton-Nashwaaksis 2.0% (won); 2. Bathurst 2.8% (held); 3. Grand Lake-Gagetown 3.0%* (won); 4. Fundy-River Valley 3.3% (won); 5. Moncton North 4.3%* (won by PCs); 6. Fredericton-Silverwood 6.5% (won); 7. Nepisiguit 6.9% (won); 8. Kent 7.0% (held); 9. Quispamsis 7.3% (won); 10. Southwest Miramichi 7.6% (won) |

The ridings of Moncton East, Moncton West, Restigouche-La-Vallée and Petitcodiac are also likely to be targeted by the Conservatives as all have switched to the Liberals since the 2006 election. Moncton East and Restigouche-La-Vallée were carried by the Liberals in by-elections while the MLAs for Moncton West and Petitcodiac crossed the floor from the PCs to the Liberals.

== Opinion polls ==
| Polling Firm | Date of Polling | Link | Liberal | Progressive Conservative | New Democratic | Green | People's Alliance |
| CBC News/L'Acadie Nouvelle | September 20, 2010 | HTML | 37 | 47 | 9 | 5 | 0 |
| Abacus Data | September 19, 2010 | PDF | 38 | 42 | 11 | 6 | 2 |
| Corporate Research Associates | September 19, 2010 | HTML | 36 | 46 | 11 | 6 | 1 |
| Corporate Research Associates | September 18, 2010 | HTML | 38 | 45 | 10 | 6 | 1 |
| Corporate Research Associates | September 17, 2010 | HTML | 37 | 49 | 9 | 4 | 1 |
| Corporate Research Associates | September 16, 2010 | HTML | 38 | 48 | 9 | 5 | 1 |
| Corporate Research Associates | September 15, 2010 | HTML | 38 | 48 | 10 | 4 | 0 |
| Corporate Research Associates | September 14, 2010 | HTML | 37 | 50 | 9 | 4 | 0 |
| Corporate Research Associates | September 13, 2010 | HTML | 37 | 49 | 10 | 4 | 0 |
| Corporate Research Associates | September 12, 2010 | HTML | 38 | 49 | 9 | 4 | 0 |
| Corporate Research Associates | September 11, 2010 | HTML | 41 | 46 | 9 | 4 | 0 |
| Corporate Research Associates | September 9, 2010 | HTML | 41 | 45 | 9 | 4 | 0 |
| Corporate Research Associates | September 8, 2010 | HTML | 43 | 45 | 8 | 3 | 0 |
| Corporate Research Associates | September 7, 2010 | HTML | 43 | 43 | 11 | 3 | 0 |
| Corporate Research Associates | September 6, 2010 | HTML | 43 | 41 | 11 | 4 | 1 |
| Corporate Research Associates | September 5, 2010 | HTML | 43 | 41 | 11 | 4 | 1 |
| Corporate Research Associates | September 4, 2010 | HTML | 43 | 42 | 10 | 4 | 1 |
| Corporate Research Associates | September 1, 2010 | HTML | 42 | 43 | 10 | 3 | 2 |
| Corporate Research Associates | August 24, 2010 | PDF | 41 | 36 | 16 | 6 | 1 |
| Corporate Research Associates | May 31, 2010 | PDF | 37 | 42 | 16 | 5 | — |
| Corporate Research Associates | March 9, 2010 | PDF | 36 | 42 | 18 | 4 | — |
| Corporate Research Associates | December 2, 2009 | PDF | 36 | 46 | 14 | 4 | — |
| Léger Marketing | November 22, 2009 | PDF | 33 | 45 | 19 | — | — |
| Corporate Research Associates | September 2009 | HTML | 41 | 35 | 22 | 2 | — |
| Corporate Research Associates | May 2009 | HTML | 41 | 40 | 16 | 3 | — |
| Corporate Research Associates | February 2009 | HTML | 50 | 34 | 13 | 3 | — |
| Corporate Research Associates | November 2008 | HTML | 45 | 38 | 13 | 4 | — |
| Corporate Research Associates | August 2008 | HTML | 49 | 34 | 14 | 4 | — |
| Corporate Research Associates | May 2008 | HTML | 51 | 36 | 11 | 2 | — |
| Corporate Research Associates | February 2008 | HTML | 63 | 26 | 8 | 2 | — |
| Corporate Research Associates | November 2007 | HTML | 53 | 32 | 10 | 4 | — |
| Corporate Research Associates | August 2007 | HTML | 60 | 30 | 7 | 2 | — |
| Corporate Research Associates | May 2007 | HTML | 53 | 33 | 10 | 4 | — |
| Corporate Research Associates | February 2007 | HTML | 59 | 27 | 11 | 2 | — |
| Corporate Research Associates | November 2006 | HTML | 65 | 27 | 6 | 2 | — |
| Election 2006 | September 18, 2006 | HTML | 47.1 | 47.5 | 5.1 | — | — |

== Candidates ==
=== Retiring incumbents ===
The following sitting MLAs have announced that they will not seek re-election.

- Tony Huntjens, Progressive Conservative MLA for Charlotte-Campobello since 2006, and previously MLA for Western Charlotte from 1999 to 2006.
- Roly MacIntyre, Liberal MLA for Saint John East since 2006, and previously MLA for Saint John Champlain from 1995 to 1999 and 2003 to 2006.
- Jeannot Volpé, Progressive Conservative MLA for Madawaska-les-Lacs since 1995.
- Joan MacAlpine-Stiles, Liberal MLA (Originally Progressive Conservative) for Moncton West since 1999.
- Stuart Jamieson, Liberal MLA for Saint John-Fundy, first elected from 1987 to 1999, and re-elected in 2003.
- Eugene McGinley, Liberal MLA, first elected from 1972 to 1978 as MLA for Bathurst, and re-elected in 2003 as MLA for Grand Lake-Gagetown.
- Cy LeBlanc, Progressive Conservative MLA elected in 1999 and re-elected in 2003 in the Dieppe-Memramcook riding. He was re-elected again in 2006 in the Dieppe Centre-Lewisville riding.
- Mike Murphy, Liberal MLA, Moncton North. Serving, Minister of Justice, former Minister of Health.

=== Candidates by riding ===
Legend

- **bold** denotes cabinet minister or party leader
- italics denotes a potential candidate who has not received his/her party's nomination
- † denotes an incumbent who is not running for re-election

==== Northeast ====
| Electoral district | Candidates | | | | | Incumbent |
| Electoral district | Liberal | PC | NDP | Green | Other | Incumbent |
|---|---|---|---|---|---|---|
| 1. Campbellton-Restigouche Centre | Roy Boudreau; 2,453; 34.42% | Greg Davis; 3,914; 54.92% | Widler Jules; 524; 7.35% | Lynn Morrison Hemson; 236; 3.31% | | Roy Boudreau |
| 2. Dalhousie-Restigouche East | Donald Arseneault; 3,631; 46.53% | Joseph Elias; 2,593; 33.23% | Ray Godin; 1,413; 18.11% | Susan Smissaert; 167; 2.14% | | **Donald Arseneault** |
| 3. Nigadoo-Chaleur | Roland Haché; 3,649; 49.77% | Fred Albert; 2,798; 38.16% | Serge Beaubrun; 706; 9.63% | Mathieu LaPlante; 179; 2.44% | | **Roland Haché** |
| 4. Bathurst | Brian Kenny; 2,899; 44.99% | Nancy McKay; 2,821; 43.78% | Sebastien Duke; 620; 9.62% | Hazel Hachey; 104; 1.61% | | **Brian Kenny** |
| 5. Nepisiguit | Cheryl Lavoie; 1,946; 32.49% | Ryan Riordon; 2,456; 41.01% | Pierre Cyr; 1,476; 24.65% | Patrice Des Lauriers; 111; 1.85% | | **Cheryl Lavoie** |
| 6. Caraquet | Hédard Albert; 3,663 – (50.07%) | Philip Chiasson; 3,041 – (41.57%) | Claudia Julien; 406 – (5.55%) | Mathieu Chayer; 206 – (2.82%) | | **Hédard Albert** |
| 7. Lamèque-Shippagan-Miscou | Alonzo Rail; 2,304 – (31.74%) | Paul Robichaud; 4,272 – (58.84%) | Armel Chiasson; 684 – (9.42%) | | | Paul Robichaud |
| 8. Centre-Péninsule-Saint-Sauveur | Denis Landry; 4,655 – (63.85%) | Anike Robichaud; 1,487 – (20.40%) | Francois Rousselle; 1,149 – (15.76%) | | | **Denis Landry** |
| 9. Tracadie-Sheila | Norma McGraw; 1,480 – (18.96%) | Claude Landry; 3,808 – (48.78%) | **Roger Duguay**; 2,518 – (32.26%) | | | Claude Landry |
| 10. Miramichi Bay-Neguac | Carmel Robichaud; 2,546 – (37.36%) | Serge Robichaud; 2,908 – (42.67%) | Marc-Alphonse Leclair; 1,132 – (16.61%) | Filip Vanicek; 93 – (1.36%) | Thomas L'Huillier (PANB); 136 – (2.00%) | Carmel Robichaud |
| 11. Miramichi-Bay du Vin | Bill Fraser; 3,290 – (49.62%) | Joan Cripps; 2,615 – (39.44%) | Kelly Clancy-King; 510 – (7.69%) | Ronald Mazerolle; 216 – (3.26%) | | Bill Fraser |
| 12. Miramichi Centre | John Foran; 2,552 – (38.56%) | Robert Trevors; 3,187 – (48.16%) | Douglas Mullin; 379 – (5.73%) | Dylan Schneider; 175 – (2.64%) | Frances Connell (PANB); 325 – (4.91%) | **John Foran** |
| 13. Southwest Miramichi | Rick Brewer; 1,952 – (30.17%) | Jake Stewart; 3,792 – (58.60%) | Jason Robar; 200 – (3.09%) | Jimmy Lawlor; 204 – (3.15%) | Wes Gullison (PANB); 323 – (4.99%) | **Rick Brewer** |

==== Southeast ====
| Electoral district | Candidates | | | | | Incumbent |
| Electoral district | Liberal | PC | NDP | Green | Other | Incumbent |
|---|---|---|---|---|---|---|
| 14. Rogersville-Kouchibouguac | Bertrand LeBlanc; 3,442 – (46.03%) | Jimmy Bourque; 3,174 – (42.45%) | Alida Fagan; 861 – (11.52%) | | | vacant |
| 15. Kent | **Shawn Graham**; 3,722 – (55.72%) | Bruce Hickey; 1,720 – (25.75%) | Susan Levi-Peters; 1,023 – (15.31%) | Garry Sanipass; 215 – (3.22%) | | **Shawn Graham** |
| 16. Kent South | Martin Goguen; 2,447 – (29.20%) | Claude Williams; 5,055 – (60.33%) | Oscar Doucet; 503 – (6.00%) | Luc LeBreton; 374 – (4.46%) | | Claude Williams |
| 17. Shediac-Cap-Pelé | Victor Boudreau; 5,244 – (61.33%) | Janice Brun; 2,121 – (24.81%) | Yves Leger; 669 – (7.82%) | Natalie Arsenault; 409 – (4.78%) | Charles Vautour (Ind.); 107 – (1.25%) | **Victor Boudreau** |
| 18. Tantramar | Beth Barczyk; 911 – (19.02%) | Mike Olscamp; 2,712 – (56.62%) | Bill Evans; 513 – (10.71%) | Margaret Tusz-King; 654 – (13.65%) | | Mike Olscamp |
| 19. Memramcook-Lakeville-Dieppe | Bernard LeBlanc; 3,426 – (50.82%) | Fortunat Duguay; 2,174 – (32.25%) | Denis Brun; 707 – (10.49%) | Fanny Leblanc; 435 – (6.45%) | | **Bernard LeBlanc** |
| 20. Dieppe Centre-Lewisville | Roger Melanson; 4,541 – (46.24%) | Dave Maltais; 3,429 – (34.91%) | Agathe Lapointe; 1,174 – (11.95%) | Paul LeBreton; 677 – (6.89%) | | Cy LeBlanc† |
| 21. Moncton East | Chris Collins; 2,694 – (41.54%) | Karen Nelson; 2,528 – (38.98%) | Teresa Sullivan; 626 – (9.65%) | Roy MacMullin; 637 – (9.82%) | | **Chris Collins**^{a} |
| 22. Moncton West | Anne Marie Picone Ford; 1,995 – (32.50%) | Susan Stultz; 2,983 – (48.59%) | Shawna Gagne; 580 – (9.45%) | Carrie Sullivan; 503 – (8.19%) | Barry Renouf (Ind.); 78 – (1.27%) | Joan MacAlpine-Stiles†^{b} |
| 23. Moncton North | Kevin Robart; 1,912 – (36.54%) | Marie-Claude Blais; 2,349 – (44.90%) | Jean Guimond; 512 – (9.79%) | Greta Doucet; 367 – (7.01%) | Carl Bainbridge (PANB); 92 – (1.76%) | vacant |
| 24. Moncton Crescent | Russ Mallard; 2,538 – (30.77%) | John Betts; 4,171 – (50.57%) | Cyprien Okana; 809 – (9.81%) | Mike Milligan; 730 – (8.85%) | | John Betts |
| 25. Petitcodiac | Wally Stiles; 1,769 – (23.84%) | Sherry Wilson; 4,135 – (55.74%) | Leta Both; 666 – (8.98%) | Bethany Thorne-Dykstra; 849 – (11.44%) | | **Wally Stiles**^{c} |
| 26. Riverview | Lana Hansen; 1,626 – (23.47%) | Bruce Fitch; 4,357 – (62.89%) | Darryl Pitre; 457 – (6.60%) | Steven Steeves; 488 – (7.04%) | | Bruce Fitch |
| 27. Albert | Claude Curwin; 1,252 – (19.54%) | Wayne Steeves; 4,009 – (62.57%) | Anthony Crandall; 412 – (6.43%) | Vernon Woolsey; 448 – (6.99%) | Lucy Rolfe (PANB); 286 – (4.46%) | Wayne Steeves |

^a – Collins won the seat in a by-election on March 5, 2007. The seat was previously held by Progressive Conservative former premier Bernard Lord.

^b – MacAlpine-Stiles crossed the floor to the Liberals on April 17, 2007. She previously sat as a Progressive Conservative.

^c – Stiles crossed the floor to the Liberals on April 17, 2007. He previously sat as a Progressive Conservative.

==== Southwest ====
| Electoral district | Candidates | | | | | Incumbent |
| Electoral district | Liberal | PC | NDP | Green | Other | Incumbent |
|---|---|---|---|---|---|---|
| 28. Kings East | George Horton; 1,418 – (21.14%) | Bruce Northrup; 4,476 – (66.73%) | Robert Murray; 487 – (7.26%) | Jenna Milligan; 327 – (4.87%) | | Bruce Northrup |
| 29. Hampton-Kings | Kit Hickey; 1,668 – (22.28%) | Bev Harrison; 4,302 – (57.47%) | Julie Drummond; 1,193 – (15.93%) | Pierre Roy; 323 – (4.31%) | | Bev Harrison |
| 30. Quispamsis | Mary Schryer; 2,752 – (34.24%) | Blaine Higgs; 4,075 – (50.70%) | Matt Doherty; 911 – (11.33%) | Mark Woolsey; 300 – (3.73%) | | **Mary Schryer** |
| 31. Saint John-Fundy | Gary Keating; 1,736 – (30.98%) | Glen Savoie; 2,913 – (51.99%) | Lise Lennon; 594 – (10.60%) | Matthew Clark; 187 – (3.34%) | Glenn McAllister (PANB); 173 – (3.09%) | **Stuart Jamieson**† |
| 32. Rothesay | Victoria Clarke; 1,694 – (28.40%) | Margaret-Ann Blaney; 3,374 – (56.57%) | Pamela Scichilone; 535 – (8.97%) | Sharon Murphy-Flatt; 361 – (6.05%) | | Margaret-Ann Blaney |
| 33. Saint John East | Kevin McCarville; 1,867 – (33.06%) | Glen Tait; 2,137 – (37.84%) | Sandy Harding; 1,338 – (23.69%) | Ann McAllister; 305 – (5.40%) | | Roly MacIntyre† |
| 34. Saint John Harbour | Ed Doherty; 1,326 – (30.45%) | Carl Killen; 1,333 – (30.66%) | Wayne Dryer; 1,203 – (27.63%) | Patty Higgins; 236 – (5.45%) | John Campbell (Ind.); 247 – (5.81%) | **Ed Doherty** |
| 35. Saint John Portland | Dan Joyce; 2,062 – (35.31%) | Trevor Holder; 2,926 – (50.10%) | Jeremy Higgins; 576 – (9.86%) | Stefan Warner; 192 – (3.29%) | Lisa Cromwell (PANB); 84 – (1.44%) | Trevor Holder |
| 36. Saint John Lancaster | Abel LeBlanc; 2,287 – (33.81%) | Dorothy Shephard; 3,433 – (50.75%) | Habib Kilisli; 688 – (10.17%) | Mary Ellen Carpenter; 247 – (3.65%) | Wendy Coughlin (PANB); 110 – (1.63%) | Abel LeBlanc |
| 37. Fundy-River Valley | Jack Keir; 1,815 – (28.74%) | Jim Parrott; 3,633 – (57.53%) | David Sullivan; 427 – (6.76%) | Stephanie Coburn; 222 – (3.52%) | Edward Hoyt (PANB); 218 – (3.45%) | **Jack Keir** |
| 38. Charlotte-The Isles | Rick Doucet; 3,176 – (51.27%) | Sharon Tucker; 2,286 – (36.90%) | Sharon Greenlaw; 305 – (4.92%) | Burt Folkins; 180 – (2.91%) | Theresa James (PANB); 248 – (4.00%) | **Rick Doucet** |
| 39. Charlotte-Campobello | Annabelle Juneau; 1,516 – (24.46%) | Curtis Malloch; 2,980 – (48.08%) | Lloyd Groom; 798 – (12.88%) | Janice Harvey; 500 – (8.07%) | John Craig (PANB); 404 – (6.52%) | Tony Huntjens† |

==== Central ====
| Electoral district | Candidates | | | | | Incumbent |
| Electoral district | Liberal | PC | NDP | Green | Other | Incumbent |
|---|---|---|---|---|---|---|
| 40. Oromocto | Georgina Jones; 569 – (12.62%) | Jody Carr; 3,662 – (81.23%) | Beau Davidson; 277 – (6.14%) | | | Jody Carr |
| 41. Grand Lake-Gagetown | Barry Armstrong; 2,108 – (29.16%) | Ross Wetmore; 3,290 – (45.51%) | J.R. Magee; 237 – (3.28%) | Sandra Burtt; 175 – (2.42%) | **Kris Austin** (PANB); 1,419 – (19.63%) | Eugene McGinley† |
| 42. Fredericton-Nashwaaksis | T.J. Burke; 2,712 – (35.28%) | Troy Lifford; 3,656 – (47.56%) | Dana Brown; 592 – (7.70%) | **Jack MacDougall**; 727 – (9.46%) | | T.J. Burke |
| 43. Fredericton-Fort Nashwaak | Kelly Lamrock; 2,586 – (34.16%) | Pam Lynch; 3,571 – (47.17%) | Andy Scott; 861 – (11.37%) | Kathleen MacDougall; 553 – (7.30%) | | **Kelly Lamrock** |
| 44. Fredericton-Lincoln | Greg Byrne; 2,178 – (35.31%) | Craig Leonard; 2,437 – (39.51%) | Jason Purdy; 945 – (15.32%) | Tracey Waite; 608 – (9.86%) | | **Greg Byrne** |
| 45. Fredericton-Silverwood | Rick Miles; 2,469 – (32.53%) | Brian Macdonald; 2,931 – (38.62%) | Tony Myatt; 1,220 – (16.07%) | Jim Wolstenholme; 903 – (11.90%) | Jim Andrews (Ind.); 67 – (0.88%) | **Rick Miles** |
| 46. New Maryland-Sunbury West | Larry DeLong; 1,502 – (23.33%) | Jack Carr; 4,097 – (63.65%) | Jesse Travis; 547 – (8.50%) | Ellen Comer; 291 – (4.52%) | | Jack Carr^{d} |
| 47. York | Winston Gamblin; 1,486 – (22.95%) | Carl Urquhart; 3,614 – (55.82%) | Sharon Scott-Levesque; 1,012 – (15.63%) | Jean Louis Deveau; 362 – (5.59%) | | Carl Urquhart |
| 48. York North | Eugene Price; 1,232 – (17.39%) | Kirk MacDonald; 4,486 – (63.33%) | Genevieve MacRae; 675 – (9.53%) | Jarrod Currie; 305 – (4.31%) | Steven Hawkes (PANB); 386 – (5.45%) | Kirk MacDonald |

^d – Carr won the seat in a by-election on November 3, 2008. The seat was previously held by fellow Progressive Conservative Keith Ashfield.

==== Northwest ====
| Electoral district | Candidates | | | | | Incumbent |
| Electoral district | Liberal | PC | NDP | Green | Other | Incumbent |
|---|---|---|---|---|---|---|
| 49. Woodstock | Jeff Bradbury; 710 – (10.22%) | **David Alward**; 4,673 – (67.27%) | Conrad Anderson; 280 – (4.03%) | Todd Antworth; 103 – (1.48%) | Dale Allen (Ind.); 996 – (14.34%); David Kennedy (PANB); 185 – (2.66%) | **David Alward** |
| 50. Carleton | Peter Cook; 1,711 – (27.17%) | Dale Graham; 3,884 – (61.67%) | Jacob Elsinga; 319 – (5.07%) | Tegan Wong-Daugherty; 384 – (6.10%) | | Dale Graham |
| 51. Victoria-Tobique | Larry Kennedy; 2,039 – (40.05%) | Wes McLean; 2,684 – (52.72%) | David Burns; 109 – (2.14%) | Wayne Sabine; 118 – (2.32%) | Carter Edgar (Ind.); 141 – (2.77%) | Larry Kennedy |
| 52. Grand Falls-Drummond-Saint-André | Ron Ouellette; 2,715 – (43.60%) | Danny Soucy; 3,058 – (49.11%) | Maureen Michaud; 292 – (4.69%) | Cécile Martel Robitaille; 162 – (2.60%) | | **Ron Ouellette** |
| 53. Restigouche-La-Vallée | Burt Paulin; 2,492 – (35.72%) | Martine Coulombe; 3,727 – (53.43%) | Alain Martel; 551 – (7.90%) | André Arpin; 206 – (2.95%) | | Burt Paulin^{e} |
| 54. Edmundston-Saint-Basile | Michelle Daigle; 1,362 – (18.60%) | Madeleine Dubé; 5,551 – (75.81%) | Michel Thebeau; 226 – (3.09%) | Michelle Simard; 183 – (2.50%) | | Madeleine Dubé |
| 55. Madawaska-les-Lacs | Jocelyn Lévesque; 1,989 – (31.85%) | Yvon Bonenfant; 3,380 – (54.13%) | Nicole Theriault; 230 – (3.68%) | | Jean-Marc Nadeau (Ind.); 645 – (10.33%) | Jeannot Volpé† |

^e – Paulin won the seat in a by-election on March 9, 2009. The seat was previously held by Progressive Conservative Percy Mockler.
