= Jesse Travis =

Canadian politician

Leader of the New Brunswick New Democratic Party Interim
- In office November 28, 2010 – March 2, 2011
- Preceded by: Roger Duguay
- Succeeded by: Dominic Cardy

Personal details
- Party: New Brunswick New Democratic Party

Jesse Travis is a Canadian politician, who was the interim leader of the New Brunswick New Democratic Party from November 2010 to March 2011.

Travis previously ran as the party's candidate in New Maryland-Sunbury West in the 2010 provincial election, and in Fredericton in the 2008 and 2011 federal elections.

== Electoral history ==
2011 Canadian federal election: Fredericton
Party	Candidate	Votes	%	±%	Expenditures
Conservative	Keith Ashfield	21,573	48.38	+5.85	$80,569.94
New Democratic	Jesse Travis	10,626	23.83	+8.47	$8,535.27
Liberal	Randy McKeen	10,336	23.18	-8.35	$53,834.28
Green	Louise Comeau	1,790	4.01	-6.15	$8,177.72
Independent	Adam Scott Ness	266	0.60	–	$101.69
Total valid votes/expense limit		44,591	100.0		$83,547.51
Total rejected, unmarked and declined ballots		207	0.46	-0.11	
Turnout		44,798	64.24	+2.11	
Eligible voters		69,732			
Conservative hold		Swing		-1.31	

2008 Canadian federal election: Fredericton
Party	Candidate	Votes	%	±%	Expenditures
Conservative	Keith Ashfield	17,962	42.53	+7.87	$73,954.11
Liberal	David Innes	13,319	31.53	-10.27	$64,776.23
New Democratic	Jesse Travis	6,490	15.36	-5.89	$6,944.89
Green	Mary Lou Babineau	4,293	10.16	+8.28	$8,526.99
Canadian Action	Ben Kelly	168	0.39	–	none listed
Total valid votes/expense limit		42,232	100.0		$80,195
Total rejected, unmarked and declined ballots		242	0.57	+0.13	
Turnout		42,474	62.13	-5.86	
Eligible voters		68,368			
Conservative gain from Liberal		Swing		+9.07	
