= J. Stewart Brooks =

Canadian politician

John Stewart Brooks (April 5, 1910 – September 13, 2000) was an engineer and political figure in the Province of New Brunswick, Canada. He represented Victoria County and then Victoria-Tobique in the Legislative Assembly of New Brunswick as a Progressive Conservative member from 1952 to 1976.

He was born in Gladwyn, New Brunswick, the son of George H. Brooks and Mabel A. Everett. In 1930, he married Grace Ruth Taylor. He worked for the Canadian Pacific Railway. Brooks served in the province's Executive Council as Minister of Municipal Affairs from 1957 to 1958, then as Minister of Public Works from 1958 to 1960, as Minister of Transportation from 1970 to 1972 and then as Minister of Agriculture from 1972 to 1973. In 1973, he was named chairman of the New Brunswick Electric Power Commission and, in 1974, chairman of New Brunswick's Treasury Board. Brooks was a past Grand Master for the province's Masonic lodge.
