= New Brunswick New Democratic Party =

Provincial political party in Canada

New Brunswick New Democratic Party Nouveau parti démocratique du Nouveau-Brunswick
- Abbreviation: NB NDP
- Leader: Alex White
- President: Kristine Wickner
- Provincial Director: Isabelle Forest
- Founded: 1933 as the New Brunswick branch of the CCF, succeeded by the New Brunswick NDP in 1962
- Headquarters: PO Box 30048 RPO Prospect Plaza, Fredericton, New Brunswick, E3B0H8
- Youth wing: New Brunswick NDP Youth Caucus
- Membership (2017): 737
- Ideology: Social democracy
- Political position: Centre-left
- National affiliation: New Democratic Party
- Colours: Orange and White
- Seats in Legislature: 0 / 49

Website
- nbndp.ca

The New Brunswick New Democratic Party (NB NDP; French: Nouveau Parti démocratique du Nouveau-Brunswick) is a social democratic political party in New Brunswick, Canada. It is the provincial section of the federal New Democratic Party.

== History ==
=== Origins and early history ===
The origins of the New Brunswick NDP can be traced back to the establishment of the Fredericton Socialist League in 1902. Prominent leaders within the movement included poet and publisher Martin Butler, as well as educator Henry Harvey Stuart, who formed a Fredericton local of the new Socialist Party of Canada in 1905. The SPC had several branches in the province prior to the First World War. Stuart was later a supporter of independent labour candidates, who had two successful candidates in Northumberland County in the 1920 provincial election. Additionally, nine Farmer candidates were elected that year. A strong believer in building alliances among the province's social movements, Stuart was later an influential figure in the Co-operative Commonwealth Federation to the time of his death in 1952.

The Co-operative Commonwealth Federation (CCF), a social-democratic and democratic socialist federal political party, was organized at Calgary in 1932. A detailed platform, known as the Regina Manifesto, was adopted the following year. In New Brunswick, supporters of the new party convinced the New Brunswick Federation of Labour to sponsor a founding convention for the New Brunswick Section of the CCF. This took place at Moncton in June 1933, with party leader J.S. Woodsworth in attendance. Harry Girvan of Coal Creek was elected president.

The New Brunswick CCF was slow to become established on the provincial political scene. It ran only one candidate in the 1939 election, Joseph C. Arrowsmith in the riding of Saint John City, winning 712 votes. The fortunes of the New Brunswick CCF rose in tandem with growing expectations for postwar social reform and the rising fortunes of the national CCF, including the election of the CCF in Saskatchewan in 1944. Under the leadership of J. A. Mugridge, a trade unionist and the chief electrician at the Saint John Drydock and Shipbuilding Company, the CCF won 11.7 percent of the vote in New Brunswick's 1944 provincial election. The best results were in Edmundston, Saint John, and Moncton, which had large numbers of union members. In that election, the CCF described itself as "the People's Party", running on a twelve-point program that included public ownership and full development of all natural resources including electricity, oil and gas and other public utilities.

The 1944 election proved to be an electoral high-point for the CCF in New Brunswick. A combination of anti-CCF propaganda, the increasing adoption of somewhat progressive policies by the New Brunswick Liberals and Conservatives, and a general trend of post-war decline for the CCF nationally all contributed to weaken the New Brunswick CCF in the 1948 provincial election. This time under Arrowsmith's leadership, they received half the votes they had won in 1944 and again won no seats. In the 1952 provincial election, the CCF ran only 12 candidates and received only 1.3% of the vote and no seats. The CCF ran no candidates in the 1956 and 1960 provincial elections.

=== The NDP to 1988 ===
The New Brunswick CCF retired from the scene to give way to the New Democratic Party (NDP), which was founded in 1961 as a Canadian social- democratic party with strong ties to organized labour, especially the Canadian Labour Congress, which was instrumental in founding the new party. At the provincial level, the New Brunswick NDP was organized in December 1962. Prospects were not good during the 1960s, however, as the province's new Liberal premier, Louis J. Robichaud, was a left-of-centre populist politician who won three successive provincial elections and introduced significant social reforms. The New Brunswick NDP did not run candidates in the 1963 provincial election and ran only three candidates in the 1967 provincial election.

In 1971, a party convention narrowly endorsed a manifesto proposed by the New Brunswick Waffle, a local group loosely related to the minority wing of the federal NDP known as The Waffle, which was known for advocating stronger socialist and nationalist policies. The federal NDP responded to the New Brunswick upset by temporarily dissolving the provincial NDP until non-Waffle leadership was re-established with the reinstatement of J. Albert Richardson. The Waffle episode had the effect of promoting greater labour involvement in the party, for fear that the party would fall under the sway of more radical supporters without it.

During the late 1970s, under the leadership of John LaBossiere, the party increasingly adopted policy positions that reflected feminist and environmentalist concerns, including opposition to aerial spruce budworm spraying and the construction of the Point Lepreau nuclear plant. These initiatives attracted new supporters while also weakening relations with some labour supporters. The party also saw its membership grow and its organizational abilities improve during the late 1970s and early 1980s. Along with promoting traditional social-democratic NDP policies, the party also attacked government patronage and poor fiscal management.

Relations with organized labour and the women's movement improved further after George Little became party leader in 1980. During Little's time as leader, in the 1982 New Brunswick election the party won its first-ever seat in Tantramar, with the election of Robert Hall to the legislature. A second seat was won in a 1984 by-election in East Saint John, but Peter Trites left to join the Liberals before the next election. The New Brunswick NDP ran a full slate of candidates for the first time in the 1987 campaign. The period saw increasing popular support (surpassing 10% for the first time) and rising membership totals, numbering over 1,000 by the mid-1980s. However, the party failed to win any seats in 1987, due to the tidal wave of support for Frank McKenna and the Liberals, who won more than 60% of the vote and took 100% of the seats in the legislature. Little stepped down from the leadership in 1988. Robert Hall served as interim leader until a leadership conference was held.

=== Elizabeth Weir (1988–2005) ===
In June 1988, Elizabeth Weir, the party's former provincial secretary, was elected as the party's new leader. After the one-sided 1987 election, Premier McKenna allowed leaders of the unrepresented parties to ask questions in the legislature and in the public accounts committee. Weir took full advantage of the opportunity, using her training as a lawyer and her speaking skills to needle the government. Her media presence and political stature increased significantly, and she was sometimes referred to by cabinet ministers as the unofficial Leader of the Opposition. In the 1991 provincial election, Weir won a seat in Saint John South, making her the first provincial NDP leader to be elected to the legislature. She was re-elected in the new constituency of Saint John Harbour in the 1995 provincial election, running against a star Liberal candidate. Weir won re-election twice more after this.

During her time in the legislature, Weir proved a strong critic of McKenna's neo-liberal policies, successfully attacking public-private partnerships such as a plan to have a youth detention centre built and operated by an American corporation. She was also an ally of organized labour in resisting legislated wage freezes that were directed at public sector employees. She promoted the expansion of union rights through legislation to prohibit the use of replacement workers in strikes. At the request of organized labour, Weir introduced the Workers Mourning Day Act, enacted in 2000, which established 28 April as an annual day of recognition for workers killed or injured in the workplace. In other areas, she addressed issues such as women's rights, pay equity, environmental protection, poverty and the rights of social assistance recipients. During her last term, she was successful in gaining the support of an all-party committee for public automobile insurance.

Despite Weir's personal popularity and her ability to attract strong candidates, she was not able to add extra seats to the party caucus. This was especially disappointing in light of the election of Yvon Godin as a federal NDP Member of Parliament in Acadie-Bathurst in 1997; he ultimately served five terms in Parliament. In 2004, Weir announced her plan to step down as leader and also resigned her seat after a new leader was chosen the following year.

=== Challenges (2005–2017) ===
The period immediately following Weir's departure was a difficult one for the party. Allison Brewer was elected as party leader in September 2005, but faced challenges due to her inability to speak French and her lack of experience in electoral politics. In the 2006 provincial election the NDP failed to run a full slate and saw their popular vote collapse. Brewer resigned soon after the election. Pat Hanratty stood in as interim leader.

He was replaced by Roger Duguay in 2007. Duguay's tenure as leader was dominated by a shakeup in the party's internal operations. Much of the old executive of the party was replaced in 2009 and a new team of modernizers began to gain prominence within the party. During the 2010 provincial election the party platform combined traditional progressive social policy, education and health spending with a greater emphasis on the need for fiscal prudence and balanced budgets and cutting wasteful government spending, including opposition to corporate welfare. The party more than doubled its share of the vote, returning to the levels achieved under Little and Weir, but no candidate, including Duguay, won a seat. He resigned as leader in November 2010.

Following Duguay's resignation, Jesse Travis was named interim leader, and a leadership race was scheduled for 2011. When one of the two candidates, Pierre Cyr, was disqualified and withdrew, the party's former campaign director Dominic Cardy was acclaimed as party leader. In a leadership review at the 2012 party convention, Cardy was endorsed by 82% of the voting members. He then continued the process of changing the party's policies and organization, in line with the Third Way model associated with former British prime minister Tony Blair, whom Cardy admired.

Logo of the NBNDP from 2015 to 2018.

By 2014, however, Cardy's political strategy was attracting criticism, especially on issues of policies on resource development in forestry, oil pipelines and shale gas. Concerns increased when Cardy recruited several prominent former Conservative and Liberal politicians as candidates for the 2014 election. These factors contributed to the defection of some NDP supporters, including former leader Allison Brewer, to the Green Party of New Brunswick, who were successful in electing David Coon in Fredericton South. The NDP received 13% of the vote in the September 22, 2014 provincial election, a record high in votes. Although Cardy came within 500 votes of winning in his constituency, the party failed to win any seats.

Cardy announced plans to resign at the next party convention, but this was suspended to enable him to run in an unexpected byelection in Saint John East in November 2014, though without success. The party executive subsequently encouraged him to continue as leader. Criticism of Cardy's policies and leadership style increased, with concerns expressed by veteran leaders such as federal NDP MP Yvon Godin and Daniel Légère, president of the Canadian Union of Public Employees, New Brunswick. Complaining of party infighting, Cardy resigned both as leader and as a party member on 1 January 2017. Later that month, he announced that he was joining the Progressive Conservatives under party leader Blaine Higgs as a member of his staff. He subsequently was appointed to cabinet when Higgs's PCs formed government.

=== Jennifer McKenzie (2017–2019) ===
On 10 August 2017, Jennifer McKenzie of St. Martins, a rural community east of Saint John, was confirmed as the new leader of the party. Before returning to New Brunswick, she served as chair of the public school board in Ottawa, Ontario. In the 2015 federal election, she ran as a candidate in Fundy-Royal, finishing in third place with 17.5% of the votes. An electrical engineer and tech entrepreneur by background, McKenzie ran for the NDP leadership on a pledge to bring the party back to its traditions of advancing social, environmental and economic justice. Outgoing interim leader Rosaire L'Italien described the change as a "rebirth" of the party and welcomed previously alienated party members to return. "I am a socialist and I believe in the power of people working together," McKenzie stated at a press conference, "I hope to take this party into the future based on the solid principles on which the New Democrats are founded." Among the party's planks for the 2018 election were plans to reduce university tuition and to eliminate community college tuition fees, plans to raise the minimum wage to $15 an hour, and plans to roll out a universal daycare and after school program run by school districts. Under McKenzie's leadership, the party registered between 5% and 13% support in the polls. More than half the party's candidates in 2018 were women, making the NDP the only political party to achieve this level. On election night, however, the NDP was eclipsed on the left by the Green Party, whose supporters included many former NDP voters. The party received 5% of the vote and was reduced to fifth place, behind the Greens and the People's Alliance of New Brunswick, who each elected three members. McKenzie placed third in Saint John Harbour, with 14.7% of the vote, slightly ahead of the Green candidate. At a party meeting on 24 February 2019, delegates voted narrowly in favour of holding a leadership convention. The following day, McKenzie stated she did not intend to run in the contest and announced her resignation.

=== Decline (2019–present) ===
In March 2019, party representatives chose 21-year-old Mackenzie Thomason, a candidate in New Maryland-Sunbury in the preceding election, as interim leader. A leadership convention was planned for August 2019, but was cancelled due to a lack of acceptable candidates.

Prospects for renewal continued to be discouraging when it was announced, in a joint statement on 3 September, that 14 candidates who ran for the NDP in the 2018 provincial election were joining the Greens. Within days, however, five of those candidates denied they were leaving the NDP and said they believed they were supporting a merger of the two parties. Green Party leader David Coon apologized for failing to confirm the decision with each of the 14 candidates before welcoming them into his party as a group. He also said there had been no formal discussion of a merger of the two parties. A news story later revealed that one of the candidates who led the move to leave the NDP had failed to qualify for the party leadership contest.

In November 2019, the party announced plans for a new leadership race, with the decision set for 14 June 2020. In April 2020, however, party president Cyprien Okana announced a decision to postpone the convention due to the emergency conditions created by the COVID-19 pandemic.

Thomason then led the party into a snap provincial election held on 14 September 2020. There were 33 candidates, many of them youthful. However, none were elected. Further, the party’s vote share dropped below two percent, the lowest since 1967. Thomason resigned as interim leader on 15 November 2020, and was quickly succeeded by party communications director Nathan Davis, who stepped down almost immediately, citing a change in circumstances following a family emergency.

On 12 December, the party chose a new interim leader, 25-year-old Chris Thompson of Fredericton. On 14 September 2021, Thomason returned to the leadership, this time on a permanent basis, by acclamation.

In May 2022, ahead of two by-elections in which the NDP failed to nominate candidates, the CBC reported that Thomason had lost a non-binding confidence vote by the party's executive council. Several weeks later, on 14 June, Thomason announced that due to internal dissension he was resigning the leadership, reluctantly, with effect from 28 June. A longstanding party member from Saint John, Alex White, was subsequently named interim leader, with a party convention expected to choose a new leader in July. According to a newsletter released by the party in May 2023, plans were changed, with a convention scheduled for 30 September 2023. However, as only one candidate registered, interim leader Alex White was acclaimed the party's new permanent leader on 11 August. In the October 2024 election, which returned a new Liberal government, the NDP ran 23 candidates for the 49 seats. Although the party finished in third place in several ridings, they were reduced to fourth place overall, with 1.3 per cent of the provincial vote, easily eclipsed by the Green Party as the province's third party.

== Leaders ==
=== New Brunswick CCF ===
- J. A. (Jim) Mugridge 1944 election
- Joseph C. Arrowsmith 1948 election
- Claude P. Milton 1952 election

=== New Brunswick NDP ===
- Jack Currie, 1965–1968
- post vacant, 1968–1970
- J. Albert Richardson, 1970–1971
- Pat Callaghan (The New Brunswick Waffle) 1971 (disputed)
- J. Albert Richardson, 1971–1976
- John LaBossiere, 1976–1980
- George Little 1980–1988
- Robert Hall (interim) 1988
- Elizabeth Weir 1988–2005
- Allison Brewer 2005–2006
- Pat Hanratty (interim) 2006–2007
- Roger Duguay 2007–2010
- Jesse Travis (interim) 2010–2011
- Dominic Cardy 2011–2017
- Rosaire L'Italien (interim) 2017
- Jennifer McKenzie 2017–2019
- Mackenzie Thomason (interim) 2019–2020
- Nathan Davis (interim) 2020
- Chris Thompson (interim) 2020–2021
- Mackenzie Thomason 2021-2022
- Alex White (interim) 2022–2023
- Alex White 2023 – present

== Electoral performance ==
=== Legislative Assembly ===
Election	Leader	Votes	%	Seats	+/−	Position	Status
1944	J. A. Mugridge		11.7	0 / 48	0	▲3rd	No seats
1948	Joseph C. Arrowsmith		6.0	0 / 52	0	3rd	No seats
1952	Claude P. Milton		1.3	0 / 52	0	3rd	No seats
1956	Did not contest						
1960	Did not contest						
1963	Did not contest						
1967	Jack Currie		0.1	0 / 58	0	▲3rd	No seats
1970	J. Albert Richardson		2.8	0 / 58	0	▲3rd	No seats
1974	J. Albert Richardson	9,092	2.9	0 / 58	0	3rd	No seats
1978	John LaBossiere	21,403	6.4	0 / 58	0	3rd	No seats
1982	George Little	39,211	10.1	1 / 58	▲1	3rd	Third party
1987	George Little	43,033	10.6	0 / 58	▼1	3rd	No seats
1991	Elizabeth Weir	44,384	10.8	1 / 58	▲1	▼4th	Fourth party
1995	Elizabeth Weir	37,579	9.7	1 / 55	0	▲3rd	Third party
1999	Elizabeth Weir	34,526	8.8	1 / 55	0	3rd	Third party
2003	Elizabeth Weir	36,989	9.7	1 / 55	0	3rd	Third party
2006	Allison Brewer	19,212	5.1	0 / 55	▼1	3rd	No seats
2010	Roger Duguay	38,686	10.4	0 / 55	0	3rd	No seats
2014	Dominic Cardy	48,257	13.0	0 / 49	0	▼4th	No seats
2018	Jennifer McKenzie	19,039	5.0	0 / 49	0	▼5th	No seats
2020	Mackenzie Thomason	6,207	1.6	0 / 49	0	5th	No seats
2024	Alex White	4,865	1.3	0 / 49	0	▲4th	No seats

== NDP members of the NB Legislative Assembly ==
There are currently no New Democrats in the Legislative Assembly of New Brunswick. In the past, three separate individuals have been elected as New Democrats:

- Robert Hall, Tantramar; 1982 to his defeat in the 1987 election
- Peter Trites, East Saint John; 1984 by-election until joining the Liberals in 1986
- Elizabeth Weir, Saint John South (1991–1995), Saint John Harbour (1995–2005); 1991 to 2005

The NDP's predecessor, the CCF never won a seat in the New Brunswick legislature. In the 1920 general election nine United Farmers and two Farmer-Labour MLAs were elected.

== See also ==
- List of New Brunswick political parties
- 1988 New Brunswick New Democratic Party leadership election
- 2005 New Brunswick New Democratic Party leadership election
- 2007 New Brunswick New Democratic Party leadership election
- 2011 New Brunswick New Democratic Party leadership election
- 2017 New Brunswick New Democratic Party leadership election
