= 2007 New Brunswick New Democratic Party leadership election =

- Date: October 23, 2007
- Resigning leader: Allison Brewer
- Won by: Roger Duguay
- Ballots: 1
- Candidates: 2

The New Brunswick New Democratic Party held a leadership election, following the resignation of Allison Brewer, on November 6, 2006, subsequent to their previous convention on September 25, 2005.

The New Brunswick NDP is a social democratic political party in the province of New Brunswick, Canada.

Members voted by mail or at a convention on October 13, 2007, where Roger Duguay was elected leader.

== Candidates ==
The Telegraph-Journal reported on August 8, 2007, that there were two declared candidates upon the close of nominations.

- Dennis Atchison, 50, candidate in Fredericton North in the 2003 election (placing third with 16.1%) and in Fredericton-Silverwood in 2006 (placing third with 11.6%).
- Roger Duguay, 43, candidate in Miramichi Bay-Neguac in the 2006 election who finished third with 26.2% of the vote—the best showing of any NDP candidate in that election.

Despite earlier speculation, Yvon Godin, 51, federal Member of Parliament for Acadie-Bathurst since the 1997 election, did not enter the race.

== Timeline ==
- November 5, 2006 - Allison Brewer resigns as leader.
- February, 2007 - The party council sets a date for a leadership vote.
- August, 2007, nominations close, Dennis Atchison and Roger Duguay are declared candidates.
- October 13, 2007 - Roger Duguay is elected leader at the convention. With only two candidates, organizers decide not to publicly release the actual vote totals that each candidate received.

== See also ==
- 1988 New Brunswick New Democratic Party leadership election
- 2005 New Brunswick New Democratic Party leadership election
- 2011 New Brunswick New Democratic Party leadership election
- 2017 New Brunswick New Democratic Party leadership election
- 2021 New Brunswick New Democratic Party leadership election
