= Roger Duguay =

Canadian politician

Leader of the New Brunswick New Democratic Party
- In office October 13, 2007 – October 25, 2010
- Preceded by: Pat Hanratty (interim)
- Succeeded by: Jesse Travis (interim)

Personal details
- Born: September 19, 1963 (age 63) Maltempec, New Brunswick
- Party: New Brunswick New Democratic Party
- Education: Bachelor of Arts Université de Moncton, Masters of Theology Université de Moncton
- Occupation: Priest, teacher

Religious life
- Religion: Christianity
- Denomination: Roman Catholicism

Roger Duguay is a former Canadian politician and Roman Catholic priest. He sought election to the Legislative Assembly of New Brunswick unsuccessfully on four occasions as a representative of the New Brunswick New Democratic Party (NDP). He served as the New Brunswick NDP's leader from 2007 to 2010.

== Political career ==
Duguay has been a candidate for the NB New Democratic Party on three previous occasions, dating back to the 1991 election.

In 1999, he ran in the riding of Centre-Péninsule. As a result, he was suspended from his position as a pastor with the Catholic Church for breaking the Diocese's policy on political activity. Although he was reinstated after the election, he later left the church voluntarily in order to continue his political career.

In the 2006 election, Duguay was the party's most successful candidate, winning 26.1 per cent of the vote in the riding of Miramichi Bay-Neguac. This result led to his successful nomination for the party leadership on October 13, 2007.

In May 2009, the party announced that Duguay would seek the nomination in Tracadie-Sheila.

A Corporate Research Associates poll conducted in June 2009 showed an improvement for the NDP from 13 to 16 percent of decided voters, while a subsequent poll conducted in September 2009 showed a jump to 22 percent. In addition, Duguay's personal popularity rating doubled from 6% to 12% in that three-month period.

Duguay received a 100% vote of confidence in his leadership from the near-100 delegates in attendance for the New Brunswick NDP Biennial Convention, held October 17, 2009.

He stepped down as leader on October 25, 2010 after failing to win a seat in the 2010 general election. On November 2, 2010, Duguay further announced that he would be leaving the NDP altogether because of what he called "feuding" between party members and "outsiders" who had been brought in to run the election campaign.

Duguay was a 2018 Quebec general election candidate for the New Democratic Party of Quebec in the Quebec City provincial electoral district of Taschereau.

== Electoral history ==
1991 New Brunswick general election: Caraquet
Party	Candidate	Votes	%
Liberal	Bernard Thériault	5,298	54.4
Progressive Conservative	Gilbert Godin	2,279	23.4
New Democrat	Roger Duguay	2,167	22.2

1999 New Brunswick general election: Centre-Péninsule
Party	Candidate	Votes	%
Progressive Conservative	Louis-Philippe McGraw	3,551	51.8
Liberal	Denis Landry	2,344	34.2
New Democrat	Roger Duguay	955	13.9

2006 New Brunswick general election: Miramichi Bay-Neguac
Party	Candidate	Votes	%
Liberal	Carmel Robichaud	3,108	45.3
Progressive Conservative	Guy Vautour	1,963	28.6
New Democrat	Roger Duguay	1,784	26.0

2007 New Brunswick New Democratic Party leadership election
Party	Candidate	Votes	%
New Democrat	Roger Duguay	>371*	>50*
New Democrat	Dennis Atchison	<371*	<50*

*The NDP did not release the vote totals of individual candidates, but there were 742 votes cast and Duguay was the winner.

2010 New Brunswick general election: Tracadie-Sheila
Party	Candidate	Votes	%
Progressive Conservative	Claude Landry	3,806	48.8
New Democrat	Roger Duguay	2,511	32.2
Liberal	Norma McGraw	1,478	19.0

2018 Quebec general election: Taschereau
Party	Candidate	Votes	%	±%
Québec solidaire	Catherine Dorion	15,373	42.52	+27.23
Coalition Avenir Québec	Svetlana Solomykina	6,862	18.98	+2.58
Liberal	Florent Tanlet	6,387	17.66	-12.74
Parti Québécois	Diane Lavallée	6,379	17.64	-14.02
Green	Élisabeth Grégoire	534	1.48	
Parti nul	Nicolas Pouliot	201	0.56	-0.51
New Democratic	Roger Duguay	196	0.54	
Citoyens au pouvoir	Christian Lavoie	152	0.42	
Équipe Autonomiste	Guy Boivin	73	0.20	+0.06
Total valid votes		36,157	98.82	
Total rejected ballots		431	1.18	
Turnout		36,588	73.74	
Eligible voters		49,619		
Québec solidaire gain from Parti Québécois		Swing		+12.33
Source(s) "Rapport des résultats officiels du scrutin". Élections Québec.
