= Elizabeth Weir =

Canadian lawyer and politician

Elizabeth Weir ONB

Leader of the New Brunswick New Democratic Party
- In office June 18, 1988 – September 25, 2005
- Preceded by: George Little
- Succeeded by: Allison Brewer

Member of the Legislative Assembly of New Brunswick for Saint John Harbour Saint John South (1991-1995)
- In office September 23, 1991 – October 13, 2005
- Preceded by: John Mooney
- Succeeded by: Ed Doherty

Personal details
- Born: Elizabeth Jane Weir; February 20, 1948 (age 78) Belfast, Northern Ireland, United Kingdom
- Party: New Brunswick New Democratic Party
- Education: University of Waterloo; University of Western Ontario
- Profession: Lawyer

Elizabeth Jane Weir ONB (born February 20, 1948) is a Canadian lawyer and politician in New Brunswick. She was elected leader of the New Democratic Party of New Brunswick in June 1988 and became an opposition voice to the Liberal government, which held all 58 seats in the Legislative Assembly of New Brunswick.

Born in Belfast, Northern Ireland, Weir was educated at the University of Waterloo and the University of Western Ontario. She has taught at York University and the University of New Brunswick. Weir was first elected to the legislature in 1991 in the riding of Saint John South where she defeated Liberal John Mooney by only 78 votes. In 1995, the riding became Saint John Harbour and she was re-elected in 1995, 1999 and 2003. During that time, she was the sole New Democrat in the legislature.

In 2000, Weir released documents accessed under the Right to Information Act surrounding a $1 billion upgrade project for the Irving Oil Refinery being put in motion without being completely assessed for its environmental impact, suggesting that the government "ignored the public interest and pandered to big business."

At the 2003 federal NDP convention at which Jack Layton would be elected party leader, Weir sought the presidency of the federal party against re-offering incumbent Adam Giambrone. Midway through the convention, Giambrone and Weir decided to seek a co-presidency. Many delegates balked, especially at the assumption that they could push through a sudden constitutional change in a party often dearly concerned with internal process. The joint ticket was withdrawn, and Weir placed second after Giambrone and ahead of a candidate from the NDP Socialist Caucus.

On October 8, 2004, Weir announced that she would be stepping down from the leadership of the New Brunswick NDP but would stay on until a successor was chosen. She also pledged to run for re-election to the legislature in the next general election; however, she eventually reversed this pledge. Allison Brewer was chosen as her successor at a September 2005 leadership convention and Weir resigned her seat from the legislature on October 13, 2005 to accept the appointment to be the first president and CEO of the new New Brunswick crown corporation the Energy Efficiency and Conservation Agency.

Weir was made a Member of the Order of New Brunswick in 2021.

Weir endorsed Alberta MP Heather McPherson in the 2026 New Democratic Party leadership election.

== See also ==
- List of University of Waterloo people
