= Allison Brewer =

Canadian politician

Allison Brewer (born July 15, 1954) is a Canadian social activist and politician, and the former leader of the New Brunswick New Democratic Party. She has been particularly active in areas of lesbian and gay rights and access to abortion. She is openly lesbian.

== Biography ==
Brewer was born in Fredericton, New Brunswick. She was the founder and longtime director of Dr. Henry Morgentaler's abortion clinic in Fredericton, New Brunswick, before moving to Nunavut in 2000. In Nunavut, she continued her activism organizing gay pride events and lobbying for the passage of the Nunavut Human Rights Act.

A prominent member of Egale Canada, she was one of its two representatives to the United Nations Conference on Women in 1995. At the event, which was held in Beijing, she was briefly detained by Chinese officials for displaying a banner which read Lesbian rights are human rights.

In 2004, she was one of seven recipients of the Governor General's Award in Commemoration of the Persons Case.

Brewer returned to her native New Brunswick in late 2004 and on May 14 of the following year announced her candidacy for the leadership of the New Brunswick New Democratic Party. On June 23, 2005, the final day for candidates to register, she briefly became the leader-presumptive as the only candidate, however the party extended the deadline to July 12 with her consent and two other candidates entered the race. Brewer went on to win the leadership on September 25, 2005, at a convention in Fredericton, becoming the first openly gay leader of a provincial party.

Brewer was thrust quickly into a potential election campaign. Her predecessor as leader, Elizabeth Weir resigned from the Legislative Assembly of New Brunswick on October 13, 2005, and a by-election was set for November 14. Brewer briefly toyed with running but held a news conference on October 18 indicating she would not run saying that it was too soon after her election as leader to enter another election campaign and citing her desire to prepare the party for the next election and improve her command of French.

She later announced that she intended to run against Minister of Health Brad Green in the riding of Fredericton South in the next election but, following an electoral redistribution, she announced she would run in the new riding of Fredericton-Lincoln.

An early election was called for September 2006 and the NDP faced a number of challenges.

On August 21, CBC Radio reported that "NDP staff had set up signs and a podium on the steps of the legislature for Brewer to make an announcement on respect for the legislature, this was in contravention of rules that forbid campaigning on the legislative grounds and the announcement was moved to the sidewalk adjacent to the property." Brewer has said that this is "a misrepresentation of what happened and is the subject of a complaint with the broadcaster" and that she "was not on the steps, nor anywhere near the steps of the Legislature that day" Regardless of the veracity of the report, the fact that this was reported as such was disadvantageous.

Despite expecting to run a full slate of candidates as late as August 23, the NDP only nominated 48 of a possible 55 candidates.

Finally, despite a commitment to participate in the French debate, Brewer later withdrew when the Radio-Canada television network would not provide simultaneous translation.

On election day, the NDP suffered its worst result since the 1974 election, winning no seats and only 5.1% of the popular vote. In her own riding of Fredericton-Lincoln, Brewer finished third with 15% of the vote despite a visit to her riding by federal NDP leader Jack Layton.

Shortly after the election, other candidates including the sitting party president, offered their renewed support and Brewer herself described the support she was receiving from party members as "overwhelming".

However, on November 6, 2006, Brewer announced her resignation to the press, stating that it was for financial reasons. It was also announced that party president Pat Hanratty served as interim leader until the October 13, 2007 leadership convention, which chose Duguay as the party's new leader.
