= List of mayors of Moncton =

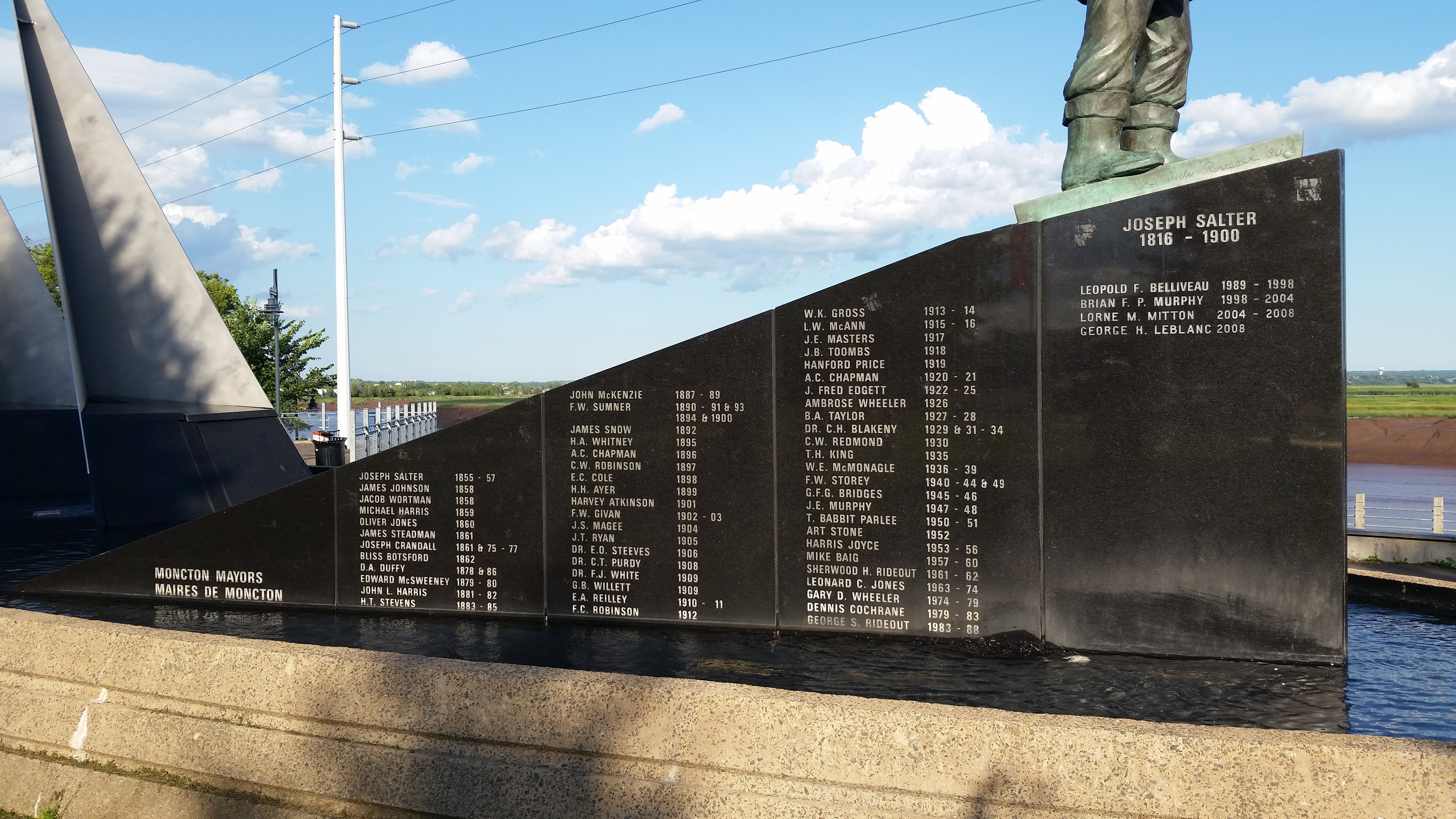
List of Moncton mayors on Joseph Salter monument

Here is a list of successive mayors of the City of Moncton, New Brunswick. It also includes a list of mayors of the former municipality of Lewisville.

| Term start | Term end | Name | Previous experience | Notes |
|---|---|---|---|---|
| 2026 | 2030 | Shawn Crossman | Moncton city councillor (2012-2026) | |
| 2025 (acting) | 2026 | Paulette Thériault | | Took over for Dawn Arnold when she was appointed to the Senate |
| 2016 | 2025 (appointed to the Senate) | Dawn E. Arnold | Member-at-large of the Moncton City Council (2012–2016) Chair of the Moncton Frye Festival (1999–2016) | First female mayor Appointed to the Senate |
| 26 May 2008 | 2016 (did not re-offer) | George H. LeBlanc | Attorney at Cox & Palmer | |
| May 2004 | May 2008 (did not re-offer) | Lorne M. Mitton | Deputy Mayor of Moncton (2000–2004) Member-at-large of the Moncton City Council (1998–2004) President of the Canadian Curling Association (1994–1995)|| | |
| 1998 | 2004 (retired to run for MP) | Brian Murphy | | lawyer |
| December 1988 (acting until 8 May 1989) | May 1998 (lost reelection) | Léopold F. Belliveau | Deputy Mayor of Moncton (1980–1988) Member-at-large of the Moncton City Council (1969–1979, 1980–1988) Teacher|| First Acadian mayor | |
| May 1983 | December 1988 (resigned to run for MP) | George S. Rideout | Attorney at Rideout & Robinson Son of former Mayor Sherwood Rideout | |
| June 1979 | May 1983 (did not re-offer to run for MLA) | Dennis Cochrane | Moncton City Councillor (1977–1979) Teacher | |
| June 1974 | June 1979 (removed from office) | Gary D. Wheeler | Moncton City Councillor (1971–1974) Civil engineer | |
| April 1963 | June 1974 (resigned to sit as an MP) | Leonard Jones | Moncton City Councillor (1957–1963) Attorney | |
| 1961 | 1962 (resigned to sit as an MP) | Sherwood H. Rideout | Liberal Party advisor Urban planner Train conducter || | |
| 1957 | 1960 (resigned after losing reelection) | Michael M. Baig | | First Jewish mayor |
| 1953 | 1957 (did not re-offer) | Harris A. Joyce | | |
| 1952 | 1953 (did not re-offer) | Arthur E. Stone | mail carrier | |
| 1950 | 1952 (resigned to serve on the New Brunswick Executive Council) | T. Babbitt Parlee | Moncton City Councillor (1944–1948) | |
| 1949 | 1949 | F. W. Storey | | |
| 1947 | 1949 | J. E. Murphy | | |
| 1945 | 1946 | G. F. G. Bridges | | |
| 1940 | 1944 | F. W. Storey | | |
| 1937 | 1939 | W. E. McMonagle | | |
| 1935 | 1936 | Thomas H. King | | |
| 1931 | 1934 | C. Hanford Blakney | Former Mayor of Moncton (1929) Newspaper publisher | |
| 1930 | 1930 | C. W. Redmond | | |
| 1929 | 1929 | C. Hanford Blakney | Newspaper publisher | |
| 1927 | 1928 | Budd. A. Taylor | | |
| 1926 | 1926 | Ambrose Wheeler | | |
| 1922 | 1925 | J. Fred Edgett | | |
| 1920 | 1921 | A. Cavour Chapman | Merchant | |
| 1919 | 1919 | Hanford Price | | |
| 1918 | 1918 | John B. Toombs | | |
| 1917 | 1917 | J. E. Masters | | |
| 1915 | 1916 | L. Wesley McAnn | | |
| 1913 | 1914 | William K. Gross | | |
| 1912 | 1912 | F. C. Robinson | | |
| 1910 | 1911 | E. Albert Reilly | Moncton City Councillor (1908–1909) Lawyer | |
| 1909 | 1909 | G. B. Willett | | |
| 1908 | 1908 | Dr. C. T. Purdy | | |
| 1907 | 1907 | Dr. F. J. White | | |
| 1906 | 1906 | Edward O. Steeves | | |
| July 1904 | 1905 | James T. Ryan | | |
| 1904 | June 30, 1904 | J. S. Magee | | |
| 1902 | 1903 | F. W. Givan | | |
| 1901 | 1901 | Harvey Atkinson | Industralist | |
| 1900 | 1900 | Frederick W. Sumner | MLA for Westmorland County (1895–1899) Hardware merchant | |
| 1899 | 1899 | H. H. Ayer | | |
| 1898 | 1898 | E. C. Cole | | |
| 1897 | 1897 | Clifford William Robinson | Lawyer Bookkepper | 12th Premier |
| 1896 | 1896 | A. C. Chapman | merchant | |
| 1895 | 1895 | H. A. Whitney | | |
| Oct 10, 1892 | 1894 | Frederick W. Sumner | hardware merchant | |
| 1892 | Oct 10, 1892 | James Snow | | |
| March 1890 | 1891 | Frederick W. Sumner | hardware merchant | City status |
| 1887 | 1889 | John McKenzie | | |
| 1886 | 1886 | D. A. Duffy | | |
| 1883 | 1885 | H. T. Stevens | publisher/MPP | Only appointed mayor |
| March 1862 | 1862 | Bliss Botsford | lawyer | Town charter repealed |
| 1861 | 1861 | Joseph Crandall | | |
| 1860 | 1860 | Michael S. Harris | | |
| 1860 | 1860 | James Steadman | judge | |
| 1859 | 1859 | Oliver Jones | Businessman | |
| 1858 | 1858 | Jacob Wortman | | |
| 1858 | 1858 | James Johnson | Politician | Resigned mid-term |
| May 1855 | 1857 | Joseph Salter | Businessman | |

List of successive mayors of Lewisville
| Term start | Term end | Name | Occupation |
| 1969 | 1973 | Norman Crossman | |

== Sources ==
- Pincombe, C. Alexander; Larracey, Edward W. (1990). Resurgo : the history of Moncton. Vol. 1. New Brunswick, Can.: City of Moncton. pp. 428–31. ISBN 0969463405. "Appendix I Moncton's Mayors from 1855-1890"
- Larracey, Edward W. (1991). Resurgo : the history of Moncton. Vol. 2. New Brunswick, Can.: City of Moncton. pp. 459–472. ISBN 0969463421. "Appendix D City Councils 1890-1990"
