= 2004 New Brunswick municipal elections =

Canadian municipal elections

Municipal elections in the Canadian province of New Brunswick were held on May 10, 2004. All 104 municipalities in New Brunswick elected mayors and councillors. Also held on that day were elections for regional health boards and district education councils.

These elections marked the end of three-year terms for elected municipal offices. Beginning in 2004, officials began to serve four-year terms, meaning the next elections will be held in 2008.

All municipal elections in New Brunswick are non-partisan.

== Summary ==
In each of the province's three major cities, the mayoral races were won by non-incumbents:

- In Saint John, Norm McFarlane, a former member of Premier Bernard Lord's cabinet, defeated incumbent Shirley McAlary, who had served since 1994.
- In Fredericton, former mayor Brad Woodside, who stepped down in 1999, announced his return to city politics on the final day candidates could file nominations, and won a close race over incumbent Les Hull and councillor Joel Richardson.
- In Moncton, which was a two-term incumbent Brian Murphy was not reoffering, deputy mayor Lorne Mitton was elected over councillor George LeBlanc.

Other cities and towns also elected new mayors:

- In Miramichi, John McKay won in a close three-way battle against Frank Trevors and Gerry Cormier. Arch Pafford, better known for founding the Confederation of Regions Party of New Brunswick, finished a distant fourth. There was no incumbent, as former mayor Rupert Bernard decided to (successfully) run for a seat on city council instead.
- In Edmundston, Gérald Allain defeated incumbent Jacques Martin.
- In Bathurst, Stephen Brunet defeated incumbent Jay Mersereau and three other challengers.
- Former Oromocto mayor Fay Tidd returned to the post that she held in the 1990s by defeating incumbent Ross Giberson and two other candidates.
- Clarence Sweetland defeated David Burrell to become mayor of Riverview. Former mayor Bruce Fitch jumped to provincial politics, winning as a Progressive Conservative candidate in the 2003 election.
- Paul Duffie, a cabinet minister in the government of Frank McKenna, was easily elected in Grand Falls.
- Raymond Cormier defeated incumbent Camille Belliveau in Shediac.
- Jeff Wright was acclaimed in Woodstock, while Jean-Eudes Savoie was also acclaimed in Tracadie-Sheila.

A small number of major communities had mayors return to their positions:

- Campbellton Mayor Mark Ramsay survived a challenge from Bruce MacIntosh to win with 54% of the vote.
- In St. Stephen, Bob Brown won 56% of the vote against Ken Parker.
- Ron Maloney won 89% of the vote in Quispamsis.
- Grace Losier was easily re-elected in Grand Bay-Westfield.
- The mayors of Dieppe (Yvon LaPierre), Caraquet (Antonio Landry), Beresford (Raoul Charest), Sackville (Jamie Smith), Rothesay (Bill Bishop), and Sussex (Ralph Carr) won by acclamation.

== Plebiscites ==
Three communities held plebiscites on election day:

- The City of Edmundston banned smoking in indoor public places by a margin of 74.1% to 25.9%.
- The City of Miramichi voted to scrap the ward system of electing city council in favour of ten at-large councillors. The plebiscite passed 53.7% to 46.3%.
- The Village of Belledune decided to keep its ward system, by a margin of 63.3% to 36.7%.

== Races in major centres ==
Below are the results of the mayoral races in selected cities and towns across the province:

=== Fredericton ===
==== Mayor ====
Candidate	Vote	%
Brad Woodside	6,967	41.1
Joel Richardson	6,221	36.7
Les Hull (inc.)	3,415	20.2
Darcy Russell	338	2.0

==== Elected to city council ====
Fredericton elects twelve councillors, each on the ward system.

Elected	Ward
Dan Keenan	Ward 1
Bruce Grandy	Ward 2
Mike O'Brien* (inc.)	Ward 3
Norah Davidson* (inc.)	Ward 4
Walter Brown (inc.)	Ward 5
Marilyn Kerton* (inc.)	Ward 6
Scott McConaghy (inc.)	Ward 7
Tony Whalen	Ward 8
Tommy Jellinek* (inc.)	Ward 9
Stephen Kelly*	Ward 10
Cathy MacLaggan	Ward 11
David Kelly	Ward 12

* acclaimed

=== Moncton ===
==== Mayor ====
Candidate	Vote	%
Lorne Mitton	8,780	49.8
George LeBlanc	8,146	46.2
Craig McCluskey	703	4.0

==== Elected to City Council ====
Moncton elects two councillors at-large, and two from each of four wards.

Elected	Ward
Kathryn Barnes (inc.)	At large
Pierre Boudreau	At large
Norm Crossman (inc.)	Ward 1
Stephen Boyce (inc.)	Ward 1
Merrill Henderson* (inc.)	Ward 2
Doug Robertson* (inc.)	Ward 2
Brian Hicks (inc.)	Ward 3
Steve Mitton	Ward 3
Chris Collins* (inc.)	Ward 4
Rene Landry*	Ward 4

* acclaimed

=== Saint John ===
==== Mayor ====
Candidate	Vote	%
Norm McFarlane	15,342	60.2
Shirley McAlary (inc.)	9,199	36.1
Russell Duke	500	2.0
Charles Frees-Melvin	448	1.8

==== Elected to Common Council ====
Saint John elects 10 councillors at large. Elected candidates only are listed below.

Elected	Votes
Michelle Hooton	13,192
Stephen Chase (inc.)	9,336
Ivan Court (inc.)	8,470
John Ferguson (inc.)	7,603
Carl White (inc.)	7,592
Glen Tait	7,032
Christopher Titus (inc.)	6,857
Peter McGuire	6,815
Jay-Young Chang	6,544
Bill Farren	6,188
