= Frederick Sumner =

Frederick Sumner may refer to:

- Frederick W. Sumner, merchant and political figure in New Brunswick, Canada
- Frederick Reginald Pinfold Sumner, English cleric and amateur photographer
