= Gary Wheeler (politician) =

Canadian politician (1938–2010)

Mayor of Moncton
- In office June, 1974 – June, 1979
- Preceded by: Leonard Jones
- Succeeded by: Dennis Cochrane

Member of the Moncton City Council for Ward 2
- In office June, 1971 – June 1974
- Preceded by: Unknown
- Succeeded by: Vacant

Chairman of the New Brunswick Hawks
- In office 1978–1982
- Preceded by: Team founded
- Succeeded by: Team dissolved

Personal details
- Born: June 3, 1938
- Died: May 2, 2010 (aged 71) Moncton, New Brunswick

Gary David Wheeler (1938–2010) was the mayor of Moncton from 1974 to 1979.

He was first elected to city council in June 1971 as a city councillor for Ward 2. He won election for mayor in June 1974. In 1979 he was forced to vacate his position after a Supreme Court of Canada ruling. The court found that the Court of Appeal of New Brunswick had erred in its finding that he followed proper procedures under the City of Moncton Consolidation Act by retaining, while mayor, a senior position in a contracting company in the city.

He was a founding member and chairman of the New Brunswick Hawks.

1979 Canadian federal election: Moncton—Riverview—Dieppe
Party	Candidate	Votes	%	±%
Liberal	Gary McCauley	20,940	43.33	+7.47
Progressive Conservative	Gary Wheeler	18,446	38.17	+23.88
New Democratic	Gregory Murphy	8,936	18.49	+15.17
Total valid votes		48,322		
