= G. M. Keith Dow =

Canadian politician (1937–2024)

Member of the Legislative Assembly of New Brunswick
- In office 1982–1987
- Preceded by: Rodman Logan
- Succeeded by: Jane Barry
- Constituency: Saint John West

Personal details
- Born: July 1, 1937 Saint John, New Brunswick, Canada
- Died: September 18, 2024 (aged 87) Quispamsis, New Brunswick, Canada
- Party: Progressive Conservative Party of New Brunswick
- Spouse: Heather Ann Chittick (died 2024)
- Children: 3
- Education: University of New Brunswick
- Occupation: educator, politician

Gordon Malcolm Keith Dow (July 1, 1937 – September 18, 2024) was a Canadian politician. He served in the Legislative Assembly of New Brunswick from 1982 to 1987 as a member of the Progressive Conservative Party from the constituency of Saint John West. Dow died in Quispamsis, New Brunswick on September 18, 2024, at the age of 87.
