= Saint John-Lancaster =

Saint John-Lancaster may refer to the following in New Brunswick, Canada:

- Saint John West-Lancaster, formerly Saint John Lancaster, a provincial electoral district
- Saint John—Kennebecasis, formerly Saint John—Lancaster, a federal electoral district
