= Shirley McAlary =

Canadian politician

Deputy Mayor of Saint John, New Brunswick
- In office 2016–2021
- Preceded by: Shelly Rinehart
- Succeeded by: John MacKenzie

74th Mayor of Saint John, New Brunswick
- In office 1995–2004
- Preceded by: Thomas J. Higgins
- Succeeded by: Norm McFarlane

Shirley A. McAlary is a Canadian politician, who served as the mayor of Saint John, New Brunswick from 1995 to 2004. She was defeated by Norm McFarlane in the 2004 municipal election.

McAlary ran for a councillor-at-large seat in the 2012 municipal election, and was reelected to Saint John City Council.

In the May 9, 2016 election McAlary became deputy mayor of Saint John.
