= Norm McFarlane =

Canadian politician

75th Mayor of Saint John, New Brunswick
- In office 25 May 2004 – 2008
- Preceded by: Shirley McAlary
- Succeeded by: Ivan Court

Member of the Legislative Assembly of New Brunswick for Saint John Lancaster
- In office 1999–2003
- Preceded by: Jane Barry
- Succeeded by: Abel LeBlanc

Personal details
- Born: Norman Melbourne McFarlane; 1935 (age 90–91) Apohaqui, New Brunswick, Canada
- Party: Independent (2004–2008) (Note: Municipal politicians in Saint John run on a nonpartisan basis)
- Other political affiliations: Progressive Conservative Party of New Brunswick
- Spouse: Cynthia Anne Kingston (m. 1963; died 2016)
- Children: 2
- Profession: Tax Broker

Norman Melbourne McFarlane is a Canadian businessman and politician. He was the 75th Mayor of Saint John, New Brunswick, Canada. He was first elected on 10 May 2004, and sworn into office on 25 May. He was defeated in the 2008 New Brunswick municipal elections by Ivan Court.

Born in Apohaqui, New Brunswick, McFarlane worked for Royal Insurance in Saint John from 1953 to 1993, retiring as Branch Manager. Following his retirement from Royal Insurance, he became a private insurance consultant for five years with Huestis & Huestis Insurance. McFarlane was the vice president of the 1985 Canada Summer Games. In the 1999 election, he was elected as a Member of the Legislative Assembly for the provincial riding of Saint John Lancaster as a Progressive Conservative and shortly afterwards became the New Brunswick Minister of Labour. In 2000, he became minister for the new Department of Training and Employment Development, a portfolio which encompassed much of his old labour portfolio as well as some social welfare programs and community colleges.

McFarlane was defeated in the 2003 election and left the cabinet as a result. McFarlane lost his seat to Abel LeBlanc, a Liberal.

He returned to politics in 2004 when he was elected mayor of Saint John by defeating Shirley McAlary, the incumbent, by a margin of over 25%.

McFarlane faced severe and lasting criticism and allegations of corruption and incompetence for his role in granting Irving Oil tax concessions in 2005, concessions that have cost the City of Saint John approximately $75 million over ten years, with a potential total loss of over $180 million.

McFarlane was the recipient of a Queen Elizabeth II Diamond Jubilee Medal in 2012. He is the president of Fundy Funeral Home in Saint John. He is a former member of the board of directors of the New Brunswick Adoption Board, and has been involved in other charities and organizations. McFarlane was the chairman of the board of directors of the Saint John Airport until 2018, when he reached the end of his nine year maximum term.

== Notes ==
New Brunswick provincial government of Bernard Lord
Cabinet posts (2)
Predecessor	Office	Successor
himself	Minister of Training and Employment Development; 2000–2003; McFarlane preceded himself as Minister of Labour	Margaret-Ann Blaney
Joan Kingston	Minister of Labour; 1999–2000; McFarlane succeeded himself as Minister of Training & Employment Development	himself
