= 2008 New Brunswick municipal elections =

Canadian municipal elections

Municipal elections were held in the Canadian province of New Brunswick on May 12, 2008. Here is a summary of results in the major communities in the province.

== Bathurst ==
Candidate	Votes	%
Stephen J. Brunet (X)	3943	86.6
James Risdon	612	13.4

== Campbellton ==
Candidate	Votes	%
Bruce N. MacIntosh	2098	59.7
Christian Mercier	1417	40.3

== Dieppe ==
Candidate	Votes	%
Jean G. Leblanc	6097	77.3
Achille Maillet (X)	1792	22.7

== Edmundston ==
Candidate	Votes	%
Jacques P. Martin	4084	44.0
Anne C. Soucie	1948	21.0
Charles E. Fournier	1622	17.5
Gérald Allain (X)	914	9.9
Reno R. Charette	388	4.2
Spilly Spiliotis	169	1.8
J. Pius Bard	150	1.6

== Fredericton ==
Candidate	Votes	%
Brad Woodside (X)	9035	70.9
Tim J. G. Andrew	3707	29.1

Elected to city council

Ward	Elected
1	Dan Keenan (X)
2	Bruce N. Grandy (X)
3	Mike O'Brien (X)
4	Eric Megarity
5	Steven Hicks
6	Marilyn Kerton (X)
7	Scott McConaghy (X)
8	Tony Whalen (X)
9	Stephen A. Chase
10	Stephen T. Kelly (X)
11	Jordan S. Graham
12	David A. J. Kelly (X)

== Grand Falls ==
Candidate	Votes	%
Marcel Yvon Deschenes	1763	59.2
Gildard Lavoie	1214	40.8

== Miramichi ==
Candidate	Votes	%
Gerry Cormier	4288	53.5
Reg Falconer	2006	25.0
Tim L. Hoban	1360	17.0
Patrick William O'Brien	359	4.5

== Moncton ==
Candidate	Votes	%
George LeBlanc	12898	76.9
Pierre V. Michaud	3868	23.1

Elected to city council

Ward	Elected	Elected
At Large	Kathryn M. Barnes (X)	Pierre A. Boudreau (X)
1	Steven Boyce (X)	Paulette Theriault
2	Merrill Henderson (X)	Nancy L. Hoar
3	Brian A. Hicks (X)	Daniel Bourgeois
4	Pepsi Landry (X)	Paul A. Pellerin

== Oromocto ==
Candidate	Votes
Fay Lillian Tidd (X)	Acclaimed

== Quispamsis ==
Candidate	Votes	%
Murray Driscoll	2966	70.3
Beth A. Fitzpatrick	1253	29.7

== Riverview ==
Candidate	Votes
Clarence O. Sweetland (X)	Acclaimed

== Rothesay ==
Candidate	Votes
William J. Bishop (X)	Acclaimed

== Sackville ==
Candidate	Votes	%
Pat A. Estabrooks	1368	59.1
Jamie A. Smith (X)	948	40.9

== Saint John ==
Candidate	Votes	%
Ivan Court	8851	36.9
John P. Ferguson	6187	25.8
Michelle Hooton	4211	17.6
Norm McFarlane (X)	3978	16.6
Mike Richardson	751	3.1

Elected to city council

Ward	Elected	Elected
At Large	Stephen Case (X)	Chris Titus (X)
1	Peter McGuire (X)	Bill Farren (X)
2	H. Gary Sullivan	Patty Higgins
3	Donnie Snook	Carl Killen
4	Bruce Court	Joe Mott

== Shediac ==
Candidate	Votes	%
Raymond Cormier (X)	1544	52.2
Léo Doiron	1415	47.8

== Woodstock ==
Candidate	Votes
Arthur L. Slipp (X)	Acclaimed
