= 2012 New Brunswick municipal elections =

Canadian municipal elections

Municipal elections were held in the Canadian province of New Brunswick on May 14, 2012.

== Cities ==
=== Bathurst ===
The incumbent mayor, Stephen Burnet, was re-elected with 81.31% of the vote in a 47% voter turnout. Burnet is believed to be the first mayor to serve three terms as Bathurst mayor. The city council elections saw five of the seven incumbents running in the city council re-elected.

Candidate	Votes	%
Stephen J. Brunet (X)	3,690	81.31
James Risdon	848	18.69

=== Campbellton ===
Long-term mayor Bruce McIntosh, who held the mayorship since 1983, was re-elected without opposition.

Candidate	Votes
Bruce N. McIntosh (X)	Acclaimed

=== Dieppe ===
Candidate	Votes	%
Yvon Lapierre	4,005	45.59
Hélène Boudreau	3,438	39.13
Dave Maltais	1,342	15.28

=== Edmundston ===
Candidate	Votes	%
Cyrille Simard	5,276	60.76
Jacques P. Martin (X)	3,407	39.24

=== Fredericton ===
Candidate	Votes	%
Brad Woodside (X)	10,309	62.93
Matthew Hayes	6,072	37.07

=== Miramichi ===
Candidate	Votes	%
Gerry Cormier (X)	4,317	55.93
Reg I. Falconer	3,046	39.46
Keith Edward Kenny	356	4.61

=== Moncton ===
Candidate	Votes	%
George LeBlanc (X)	14,424	87.01
Carl Bainbridge	2,153	12.99

=== Saint John ===
Candidate	Votes	%
Mel Norton	17,309	75.56
Ivan Court (X)	3,494	15.25
Matthew D. Thompson	1,278	5.58
Joseph Alan Callahan	827	3.61

== Towns ==
=== Grand Bay-Westfield ===
Grace Losier, who had served as the mayor of Grand Bay-Westfield since 1998, was re-elected by acclamation to a fifth term.

Candidate	Votes
Grace Losier (X)	Acclaimed

=== Grand Falls ===
Candidate	Votes	%
Richard Keeley	1,385	44.63
Marcel Deschênes (X)	1,157	37.29
Denise Lagacé Rioux	561	18.08

=== Maisonnette ===
Jason Godin, a business administration student at the Université de Moncton, was elected with 73.01% of the vote in a town of about 570 people. At 19 years old, Jason Godin became the youngest mayor in the history of New Brunswick. He later ran as a New Democratic Party candidate in the 2015 Canadian federal election, but lost. He later chose not to seek a second term.

Candidate	Votes	%
Jason Godin	284	73.01
Sam Godin	105	26.99

=== Oromocto ===
Candidate	Votes	%
Bob Edward Powell	656	39.05
Dianne D. Buchanan	608	36.19
Michael James MacDonald	416	24.76

=== Quispamsis ===
Candidate	Votes	%
Murray Driscoll (X)	3,161	65.64
Beth A. Fitzpatrick	1,655	34.36

=== Riverview ===
Candidate	Votes	%
Ann Seamans	3,067	48.44
Donald R. Lenehan	2,053	32.42
Mark G. Crandall	1,212	19.14

=== Rothesay ===
Candidate	Votes	%
William J. Bishop (X)	2,123	53.27
Kathryn M. Hanson	1,862	46.73

=== Sackville ===
Candidate	Votes	%
Robert D. Berry	1,033	49.50
Sabine Barbara Dietz	503	24.10
Keith B. Carter	291	13.94
John Murchie	260	12.46

=== Shediac ===
Candidate	Votes	%
Jacques LeBlanc	1,890	60.97
Peter Breau	662	21.35
Gerry O'Brien	548	17.68

=== Woodstock ===
Candidate	Votes
Arthur L. Slipp (X)	Acclaimed
