= Leopold Belliveau =

Canadian politician

His Worship Léopold Belliveau

Mayor of Moncton, New Brunswick
- In office December 1988 – May 1998
- Preceded by: George Rideout
- Succeeded by: Brian Murphy

Personal details
- Born: 1934

Léopold F. Belliveau was the Mayor of Moncton from 1988 to 1998. He was the first Acadian mayor of the city. During his tenure, he introduced one of the first privately operated municipal water services in North America.

He was first elected to Moncton City Council in 1969 and held his seat as city councillor for Ward 3 and later as councillor-at-large until being defeated in an election in June 1979. He was reelected in May 1980 and served as deputy mayor until December 1988, when he assumed the position of mayor with the resignation of George Rideout, who stepped down to run in the federal election. He won election for mayor in May 1989 and held the seat until May 1998. In all, he served on city council for nearly thirty years.

He was a member of the Federation of Canadian Municipalities Board of Directors, which in 2000 added his name to its Roll of Honour.

The City of Moncton has named a street after its former mayor.
