= Gary McCauley =

Canadian politician (1940–2018)

Member of Parliament for Moncton
- In office 1979–1984

Personal details
- Born: Gary Francis McCauley; 1 April 1940; Cochrane, Ontario, Canada
- Died: 13 May 2018 (aged 78); Ottawa, Ontario, Canada
- Political party: Liberal
- Occupation: Clergyman, broadcaster

Gary Francis McCauley (born 1 April 1940 in Cochrane, Ontario; died 13 May 2018 in Ottawa) was a Liberal party member of the House of Commons of Canada. He was a clergyman (Anglican Church of Canada) and broadcaster by career.

McCauley attended General Theological Seminary in New York City, graduating in 1966.

He represented New Brunswick's Moncton electoral district since winning that seat in the 1979 federal election. McCauley was re-elected in the 1980 election, but lost in 1984 to Dennis Cochrane of the Progressive Conservative party. McCauley served in the 31st and 32nd Canadian Parliaments.

== Electoral record ==
1984 Canadian federal election: Moncton—Riverview—Dieppe
Party	Candidate	Votes	%	±%
Progressive Conservative	Dennis Cochrane	29,936	57.17	+22.26
Liberal	Gary McCauley	14,557	27.80	-20.16
New Democratic	Gregory Murphy	7,629	14.57	-2.14
Independent	Bob Kirk	243	0.46	Ø
Total valid votes		52,365		

1980 Canadian federal election: Moncton—Riverview—Dieppe
Party	Candidate	Votes	%	±%
Liberal	Gary McCauley	22,365	47.96	+4.63
Progressive Conservative	Dave Lockhart	16,277	34.91	-3.26
New Democratic	Gregory Murphy	7,791	16.71	-1.78
Independent	Raymond Léger	146	0.31	Ø
Marxist–Leninist	Nancy DesRosiers	51	0.11	Ø
Total valid votes		46,630		
lop.parl.ca

1979 Canadian federal election: Moncton—Riverview—Dieppe
Party	Candidate	Votes	%	±%
Liberal	Gary McCauley	20,940	43.33	+7.47
Progressive Conservative	Gary Wheeler	18,446	38.17	+23.88
New Democratic	Gregory Murphy	8,936	18.49	+15.17
Total valid votes		48,322		
