= Saint John West (electoral district) =

Defunct provincial electoral district in New Brunswick, Canada

New Brunswick electoral district

Defunct provincial electoral district
- Legislature: Legislative Assembly of New Brunswick
- District created: 1967
- District abolished: 1994
- First contested: 1967
- Last contested: 1991

Saint John West was a provincial electoral district in New Brunswick, Canada. It was created from the multi-member riding of Saint John County in the 1967 electoral redistribution, and was abolished in the 1994 electoral redistribution.

== Members of the Legislative Assembly ==
Assembly	Years	Member	Party
Riding created from Saint John County
46th	1967–1970	Rodman Logan	Progressive Conservative
47th	1970–1974	Rodman Logan	Progressive Conservative
48th	1974–1978	Rodman Logan	Progressive Conservative
49th	1978–1982	Rodman Logan	Progressive Conservative
50th	1982–1987	G. M. Keith Dow	Progressive Conservative
51st	1987–1991	Jane Barry	Liberal
52nd	1991–1995	Jane Barry	Liberal
Riding dissolved into Saint John Lancaster, Grand Bay-Westfield and Charlotte

== Election results ==
1991 New Brunswick general election
Party	Candidate	Votes	%	±%
Liberal	Jane Barry	3,527	39.46	-8.15
Confederation of Regions	Jim Webb	2,471	27.64	–
Progressive Conservative	Gerry Maher	1,559	17.44	-17.15
New Democratic	Robert W. Hickes	1,382	15.46	-2.35
Total valid votes		8,939	100.0	
Liberal hold		Swing		-17.90

1987 New Brunswick general election
Party	Candidate	Votes	%	±%
Liberal	Jane Barry	4,208	47.61	+15.68
Progressive Conservative	G. M. Keith Dow	3,057	34.59	-19.68
New Democratic	Bob Jones	1,574	17.81	+4.01
Total valid votes		8,839	100.0	
Liberal gain from Progressive Conservative		Swing		+17.68

1982 New Brunswick general election
Party	Candidate	Votes	%	±%
Progressive Conservative	G. M. Keith Dow	4,590	54.27	-0.14
Liberal	Al Brien	2,701	31.93	-1.41
New Democratic	Barry Robson	1,167	13.80	+1.55
Total valid votes		8,458	100.0	
Progressive Conservative hold		Swing		+0.64

1978 New Brunswick general election
Party	Candidate	Votes	%	±%
Progressive Conservative	Rodman Emmason Logan	3,935	54.41	-5.08
Liberal	Delvan G. O'Brien	2,411	33.34	-7.17
New Democratic	James William Orr	886	12.25	–
Total valid votes		7,232	100.0	
Progressive Conservative hold		Swing		+1.04

1974 New Brunswick general election
Party	Candidate	Votes	%	±%
Progressive Conservative	Rodman E. Logan	4,509	59.49	-8.80
Liberal	Suzanne Ball	3,071	40.51	+12.54
Total valid votes		7,580	100.0	
Progressive Conservative hold		Swing		-10.67

1970 New Brunswick general election
Party	Candidate	Votes	%	±%
Progressive Conservative	Rodman E. Logan	4,807	68.29	-0.03
Liberal	Dr. John E. H. Waide	1,969	27.97	-3.71
New Democratic	David E. Gaudette	263	3.74	–
Total valid votes		7,039	100.0	
Progressive Conservative hold		Swing		+1.84

1967 New Brunswick general election
Party	Candidate	Votes	%	±%
Progressive Conservative	Rodman Logan	4,751	68.32	
Liberal	Russell Webb	2,203	31.68	
Total valid votes		6,954	100.0	
Progressive Conservative notional gain		Swing		

== See also ==
- List of New Brunswick provincial electoral districts
- Canadian provincial electoral districts
