= 1991 Progressive Conservative Party of New Brunswick leadership election =

- Date: June 15, 1991
- Convention: Fredericton, New Brunswick
- Resigning leader: Barbara Baird Filliter
- Won by: Dennis Cochrane
- Ballots: 1
- Candidates: 2

The Progressive Conservative Party of New Brunswick held a leadership election in 1991 to replace its outgoing leader Barbara Baird Filliter. The winner was former Moncton mayor and member of parliament Dennis Cochrane, who later also won the riding of Petitcodiac in the 1991 general election.

The candidates were Cochrane and St. Andrews mayor and teacher Bev Lawrence. Fredericton—York—Sunbury member of parliament Bud Bird and party president Emilien LeBreton were also expected to run but did not enter the race.

== Results ==
1991 PCNB leadership result
Candidate	Votes	%
Dennis Cochrane	955	89.2
Bev Lawrence	116	10.8
