= Charlie Thomas (politician) =

Canadian politician

Charles Humbert Thomas

Member of Parliament for Moncton
- In office June 1968 – May 1974

Personal details
- Born: 24 June 1916 Fredericton, New Brunswick
- Died: 14 January 1976 (aged 60)
- Party: Progressive Conservative
- Profession: businessman, wholesaler

Charles Humbert Thomas (24 June 1915 – 14 January 1976) was a Progressive Conservative party member of the House of Commons of Canada. He was born in Fredericton, New Brunswick and became a businessman and wholesaler by career.

He was first elected at the Moncton riding in the 1968 general election, then re-elected there in the 1972 election. Charlie Thomas left federal office when he was defeated at Moncton by independent candidate Leonard Jones in the 1974 federal election.

== Electoral history ==
1974 Canadian federal election: Moncton—Riverview—Dieppe
| Party | Candidate | Votes | % | ±% |
|---|---|---|---|---|
| Independent | Leonard Jones | 20,671 | 45.76 | Ø |
| Liberal | Léonide Cyr | 16,199 | 35.86 | -3.91 |
| Progressive Conservative | Charlie Thomas | 6,456 | 14.29 | -38.33 |
| New Democratic | David Britton | 1,501 | 3.32 | -1.33 |
| Social Credit | Bob Taylor | 343 | 0.76 | -2.20 |
| Total valid votes | | 45,170 | | |

1972 Canadian federal election: Moncton—Riverview—Dieppe
| Party | Candidate | Votes | % | ±% |
|---|---|---|---|---|
| Progressive Conservative | Charlie Thomas | 22,657 | 52.62 | +2.52 |
| Liberal | Myron Mitton | 17,124 | 39.77 | -2.09 |
| New Democratic | Morrie Baum | 2,003 | 4.65 | -1.85 |
| Social Credit | Bob Taylor | 1,273 | 2.96 | Ø |
| Total valid votes | | 43,057 | | |

1968 Canadian federal election: Moncton—Riverview—Dieppe
| Party | Candidate | Votes | % |
|---|---|---|---|
| Progressive Conservative | Charlie Thomas | 17,969 | 50.10 |
| Liberal | Margaret Rideout | 15,013 | 41.86 |
| New Democratic | Barrie N. Hould | 2,332 | 6.50 |
| Independent | R.F. Robinson | 553 | 1.54 |
| Total valid votes | | 35,867 | |
