= Dawn Arnold =

Canadian politician

The Honourable Dawn Arnold
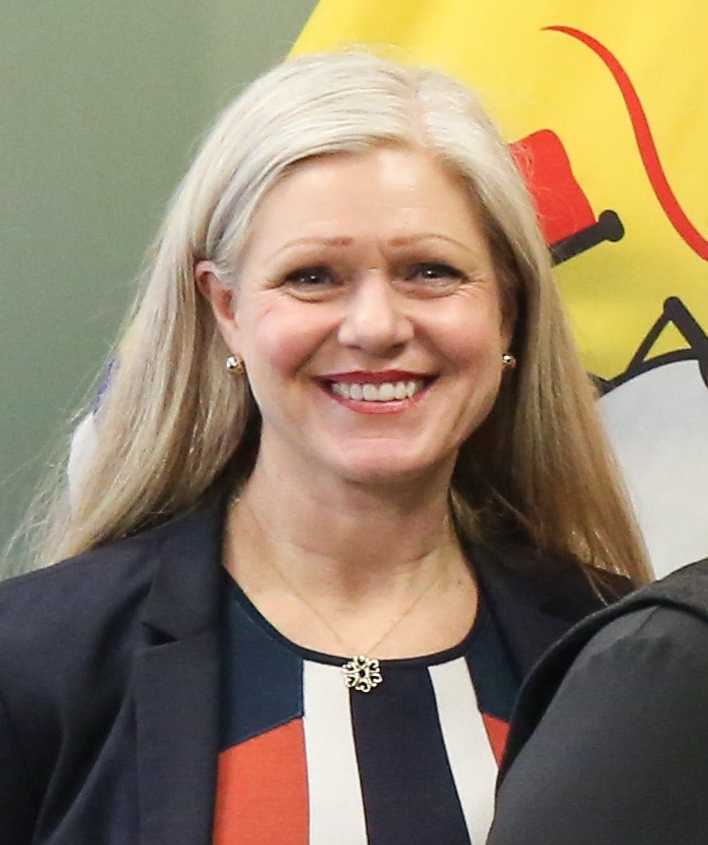
- Arnold in 2018

Canadian Senator from New Brunswick
- Incumbent
- Assumed office March 7, 2025
- Nominated by: Justin Trudeau
- Appointed by: Mary Simon

Mayor of Moncton
- In office May 2016 – March 7, 2025
- Preceded by: George LeBlanc
- Succeeded by: Paulette Thériault (acting)

Member-at-large of the Moncton City Council
- In office 2012–2016

Chair of the Moncton Frye Festival
- In office 1999–2016

Personal details
- Born: April 23, 1966 (age 60) Mount Brydges, Ontario
- Citizenship: Canadian
- Party: Independent Senators Group
- Spouse: Paul Goobie

Dawn E. Arnold (born April 23, 1966) is a Canadian politician who served as mayor of Moncton, New Brunswick from 2016 to 2025. She was first elected in the 2016 municipal election. She was the city's first female mayor.

Dawn Arnold was born on April 23, 1966 in Mount Brydges, Ontario.

Prior to winning the mayoralty, Arnold served a term on Moncton City Council as a city councillor at large, and was the chair of the city's Frye Festival.

She was re-elected mayor in May 2021, in an election which had been postponed due to the COVID-19 pandemic in New Brunswick.

On March 7, 2025, she was appointed to the Senate of Canada by the Governor General on the advice of Prime Minister Justin Trudeau and joined the Independent Senators Group.

== Education ==
Arnold attended Strathroy District Collegiate Institute before studying at the University of Paul Valéry in Montpellier, France, where she received a Diploma in French Language in 1986. She subsequently earned a Bachelor of Arts degree from the University of Toronto in 1989 and a diploma from the Radcliffe Publishing Course at Harvard University in 1990.

Her subsequent executive education includes the Governance Essentials Program at the Rotman School of Management and the Institute of Corporate Directors (2008), the Directors' Education Program at the Sobey School of Business, Saint Mary's University, and the Institute of Corporate Directors (2015), and the Bloomberg Harvard City Leadership Initiative (2022).

== Career ==
=== Publishing and Cultural Sector ===
She began her publishing career as a sales and marketing coordinator at Somerville House Publishing (1988–1991). She subsequently worked as a trade publications coordinator at the Canadian Museum of Nature (1991–1992) and as a trade and special projects consultant at Carleton University Press (1992). From 1992 to 1997, she served as head of trade publications and publisher of Global Biodiversity at the Canadian Museum of Nature.

She served as secretary and acting treasurer of the Northrop Frye International Literary Festival from 1999 to 2001 and as its president from 2001 to 2016. The festival was described as Canada's only bilingual international literary festival and Atlantic Canada's largest literary event. She was also a board member and chair of the 10th Anniversary Committee of the Capitol Theatre (2002–2004).

=== Municipal Government and Public Service ===
She was elected councillor-at-large for the City of Moncton in 2012 and served until 2016. During this period, she served on the Moncton Public Library board, Downtown Moncton Centreville Inc., the Bilingualism in Moncton Committee, the Riverfront Development Committee, and the Codiac Transit Interim Governing Board (2012–2016). She also served on the City of Moncton Cultural Affairs Committee (2011–2012) and the Advisory Committee on Downtown Development and Revitalization.

She served as mayor of the City of Moncton from 2016 to 2025. During her tenure, she chaired the City of Moncton Pension Board and Moncton Industrial Development along with the Mayor's Youth Advisory Committee and Mayor's Seniors Advisory Committee (2016–2025).

Arnold was appointed to the Senate of Canada in 2025 and is a member of the Independent Senators Group. She serves on the Standing Committee on Human Rights, the Standing Committee on Social Affairs, Science, Technology, and the Standing Committee on Transportation and Communications.

== Honours and Awards ==
Her honours and awards include the Queen's Golden Jubilee Medal (2002); inclusion in Prosperity magazine's Who's Who in Metro Moncton (2008); recognition in Progress magazine's “20 People We Love” (2008); appointment to the Order of New Brunswick (2010); the YWCA Women of Distinction Award (2010); two Paul Harris Fellow recognitions; appointment as a Chevalier of the French Republic in the Order of Arts and Letters (2017); the Phénoménal Woman Award (2021); and the Queen's Platinum Jubilee Medal (2023).
