= Claudette Bradshaw =

Canadian politician (1949–2022)

The Honourable Claudette Bradshaw PC ONB
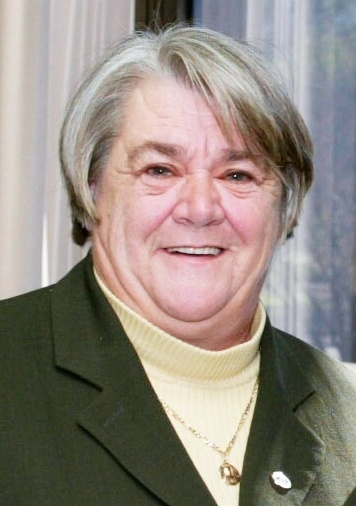
- Bradshaw in 2003

Minister of Labour
- In office November 23, 1998 – July 20, 2004
- Prime Minister: Jean Chrétien; Paul Martin
- Preceded by: Lawrence MacAulay
- Succeeded by: Joe Fontana

Member of Parliament for Moncton—Riverview—Dieppe
- In office June 2, 1997 – January 23, 2006
- Preceded by: George Rideout
- Succeeded by: Brian Murphy

Personal details
- Born: April 8, 1949 Moncton, New Brunswick, Canada
- Died: March 26, 2022 (aged 72) Moncton, New Brunswick, Canada
- Party: Liberal
- Profession: Executive Director

Claudette Bradshaw PC ONB (April 8, 1949 – March 26, 2022) was a Canadian politician who served as Member of Parliament (MP) for the riding of Moncton—Riverview—Dieppe, New Brunswick. She was first elected on June 2, 1997, and served until the 2006 election. She was a member of the Liberal Party of Canada.

Claudette Bradshaw was appointed Parliamentary Secretary to the Minister for International Cooperation and Minister Responsible for the Francophonie on June 10, 1997. On November 23, 1998, she was appointed to cabinet as Minister of Labour. After being re-elected in November 2000, she was re-appointed Minister of Labour on January 15, 2002, and again on December 12, 2003. From March 23, 1999, until July 20, 2004, she was the Federal Coordinator on Homelessness.

After the 2004 election, Prime Minister Paul Martin shuffled the cabinet, and demoted Bradshaw to the position of Minister of State (Human Resources Development). In November 2005, Bradshaw announced that she would not stand for re-election in the 2006 federal election.

Following her retirement from federal politics, there was some speculation that she would run for the provincial Liberals in the next New Brunswick election in the riding of Kent South. Bradshaw later announced she was not interested in re-entering electoral politics but was appointed special advisor to leader Shawn Graham for that election campaign.

In 2009, she was appointed a member of the Order of New Brunswick. In 2020, she was awarded the Human Rights Award of the Province of Brunswick.

Bradshaw died on March 26, 2022, at the age of 72 from cancer. She is buried at the Our Lady of Cavalry Cemetery in Dieppe, New Brunswick.

== Lifetime work ==
In 1974, Claudette Bradshaw founded the Moncton Headstart Early Family Intervention Center.

27th Canadian Ministry (2003–2006) – Cabinet of Paul Martin
Cabinet posts (2)
Predecessor	Office	Successor
	Minister of State (Human Resources Development); 2004–2006	
cont'd from 26th Min.	Minister of Labour; 2003–2004	Joe Fontana
Special Cabinet Responsibilities
Predecessor	Title	Successor
cont'd from 26th Min.	Minister responsible for Homelessness; 2003–2004	position abolished
26th Canadian Ministry (1993–2003) – Cabinet of Jean Chrétien
Cabinet post (1)
Predecessor	Office	Successor
Lawrence MacAulay	Minister of Labour; 1998–2003	cont'd into 27th Min.
Special Cabinet Responsibilities
Predecessor	Title	Successor
position created	Minister responsible for Homelessness; 1999–2003	cont'd into 27th Min.
Sub-Cabinet Post
Predecessor	Title	Successor
	Secretary of State (Multiculturalism) (Status of Women) (2002–2003)	
Parliament of Canada
Preceded by George S. Rideout, Liberal	Member of Parliament for Moncton—Riverview—Dieppe; 1997–2006	Succeeded by Brian Murphy, Liberal
