= Rodman Logan =

Canadian politician (1922–2004)

Member of the Legislative Assembly of New Brunswick
- In office 1963–1982
- Succeeded by: G. M. Keith Dow
- Constituency: Saint John County (1963–67); Saint John West (1967–82)

Personal details
- Born: September 7, 1922 Saint John, New Brunswick
- Died: September 15, 2004 (aged 82) Saint John, New Brunswick
- Party: Progressive Conservative Party of New Brunswick
- Spouse: Evelyn Pearl DeWitt
- Children: 4
- Education: University of New Brunswick
- Occupation: lawyer, judge

Rodman Emmason Logan (September 7, 1922 – September 15, 2004) was a Canadian politician. He served in the Legislative Assembly of New Brunswick from 1963 to 1982 as a member of the Progressive Conservative party from the constituency of Saint John County from 1963 to 1967 and Saint John West from 1967 to 1982.
