= A. Cavour Chapman =

His Worship A. Cavour Chapman

Mayor of Moncton, New Brunswick
- In office 1896–1896
- Preceded by: Frederick W. Sumner
- Succeeded by: Clifford William Robinson
- In office 1920–1921
- Preceded by: Hanford Price
- Succeeded by: J. Fred Edgett

Personal details
- Born: Adelbert Cavour Chapman; October 25, 1860 Dorchester, New Brunswick
- Died: September 1, 1943 (aged 82) Moncton, New Brunswick
- Spouse: Althea Alice Cleveland (m. 1883)
- Children: 4
- Education: Mount Allison University
- Profession: Manufacturer

Adelbert Cavour Chapman (October 25, 1860 – September 1, 1943) was a former mayor of Moncton, New Brunswick, in 1896, 1920 and 1921. He was born and raised in Dorchester, and studied at Mount Allison University.

== Early life ==
He was the son of Robert A. and Mary Elizabeth (Frost) Chapman. He married P. Althea Cleveland on October 24, 1883, and they have two sons and two daughters.

== Career ==
Prior to being elected Mayor, Chapman served the city as an Alderman on Moncton City Council. He was owner of the New Brunswick Anchor Wire Fence Company, president of the Kent Lumber Company and National Dry Cleaning, Ltd (1919), a founding Director of the Central Trust Company Limited and one of the incorporaters of the Petitcodiac Hydro Development Company. He was also a president of the Moncton Hospital Board of Trustees.

== Residence ==
His residence 169, Botsford Street was declared as a Historic Place in 2006.

== Notes ==
- Pincombe, C. Alexander; Larracey, Edward W. (1990). Resurgo : the history of Moncton. Vol. 2. New Brunswick, Can.: City of Moncton. ISBN 0969463421.
