= Dorothy Shephard =

Canadian politician

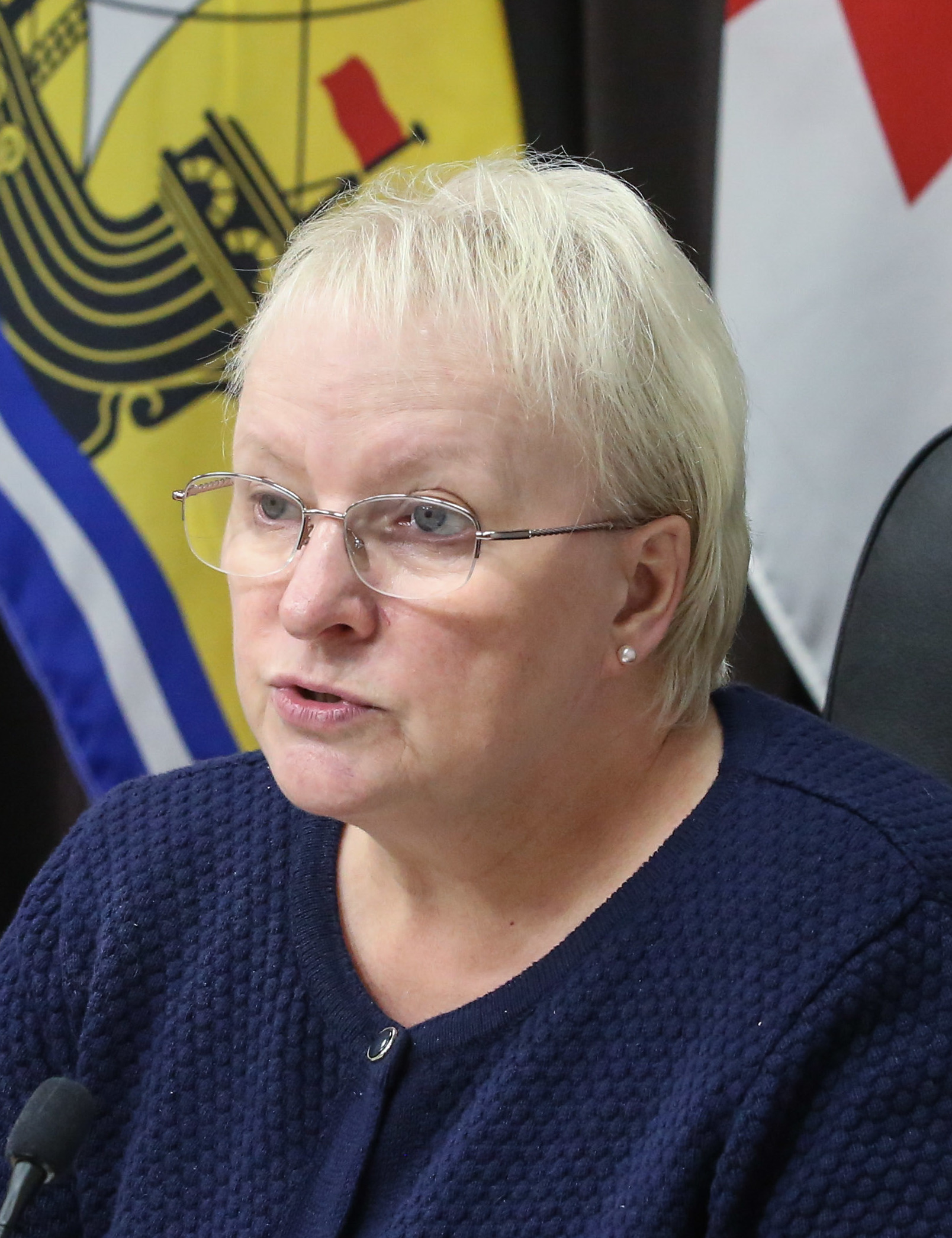

Minister of Health
- In office September 29, 2020 – July 15, 2022
- Preceded by: Ted Flemming
- Succeeded by: Bruce Fitch

Minister of Social Development
- In office July 15, 2022 – June 15, 2023
- Premier: Blaine Higgs
- Preceded by: Bruce Fitch
- Succeeded by: Jill Green (Social Development); Kathy Bockus (Seniors)
- In office November 9, 2018 – September 29, 2020
- Premier: Blaine Higgs
- Preceded by: Stephen Horsman (Families and Children); Lisa Harris (Seniors and Long-Term Care)
- Succeeded by: Bruce Fitch

Minister of Healthy and Inclusive Communities
- In office October 9, 2012 – October 7, 2014
- Premier: David Alward
- Preceded by: Trevor Holder (Culture, Tourism, and Healthy-Living)
- Succeeded by: Cathy Rogers

Member of the New Brunswick Legislative Assembly for Saint John Lancaster
- In office September 27, 2010 – September 19, 2024
- Preceded by: Abel LeBlanc
- Succeeded by: Kate Elman Wilcott

Personal details
- Born: 1960 or 1961 (age 64–65) Saint John, New Brunswick, Canada
- Party: Progressive Conservative

Dorothy Shephard (born c. 1961) is a Canadian politician, who was elected to the Legislative Assembly of New Brunswick in the 2010 provincial election and served until 2024. She represented the electoral district of Saint John Lancaster as a member of the Progressive Conservatives. She was born and raised in Saint John. Shephard was re-elected in the 2014, 2018 and 2020 provincial elections. Prior to becoming involved in politics, she owned and operated Benjamin Moore Colour Centre, a retail decorating store, for 17 years.

Shephard served as Minister of Healthy and Inclusive Communities in the Alward government from 2012 to 2014. In 2018, she was appointed Minister of Social Development in the Higgs government. In 2020, she was appointed Minister of Health, and in 2022, she was returned to the post of Minister of Social Development.

Shephard resigned from cabinet on June 15, 2023, by handing Premier Blaine Higgs a handwritten resignation letter on the floor of legislature after a voting for an opposition motion calling for further studies on Policy 713. In subsequent media interviews, she cited frustration with Higgs' leadership approach as the reason for her resignation, with his management of Policy 713 being the culmination of her frustrations. On March 21, 2024 Shephard announced that she would not be a contestant in the provincial election scheduled for October 2024, citing a conflict between the party's traditionally "moderate, centrist values", which she supported, and its recent "hyper-focused trend with far-right politics".

== Election results ==
2020 New Brunswick general election: Saint John Lancaster
Party	Candidate	Votes	%	±%
Progressive Conservative	Dorothy Shephard	3,560	54.24	+9.09
Liberal	Sharon Teare	1,471	22.41	-3.58
Green	Joanna Killen	938	14.29	+5.53
People's Alliance	Paul Seelye	394	6.00	-7.87
New Democratic	Don Durant	201	3.06	-3.17
Total valid votes		6,564	100.0	
Total rejected ballots		18	0.27	
Turnout		6,582	63.39	
Eligible voters		10,384		
Progressive Conservative hold		Swing		+6.34

2018 New Brunswick general election: Saint John Lancaster
Party	Candidate	Votes	%	±%
Progressive Conservative	Dorothy Shephard	3,001	45.15	+5.97
Liberal	Kathleen Riley-Karamanos	1,727	25.99	-6.35
People's Alliance	Paul Seelye	922	13.87	--
Green	Doug James	582	8.76	+4.53
New Democratic	Tony Mowery	414	6.23	-16.74
Total valid votes		6,646	100.0	
Total rejected ballots				
Turnout				
Eligible voters				

2014 New Brunswick general election: Saint John Lancaster
Party	Candidate	Votes	%	±%
Progressive Conservative	Dorothy Shephard	2,619	39.18	-11.57
Liberal	Peter McGuire	2,162	32.34	-1.49
New Democratic	Abel LeBlanc	1,535	22.97	+12.79
Green	Ashley Durdle	283	4.23	+0.59
Independent	Mary Ellen Carpenter	85	1.27	–
Total valid votes		6,684	100.0	
Total rejected ballots		19	0.28	
Turnout		6,703	62.67	
Eligible voters		10,696		
Progressive Conservative notional hold		Swing		-5.04
Independent candidate Mary Ellen Carpenter lost 2.37 percentage points from her performance in the 2010 election as a Green candidate. New Democratic candidate Abel LeBlanc lost 10.86 percentage points from his performance in the 2010 election as a Liberal candidate.
Source: Elections New Brunswick

2010 New Brunswick general election: Saint John Lancaster
Party	Candidate	Votes	%	±%
Progressive Conservative	Dorothy Shephard	3,429	50.75	+13.91
Liberal	Abel LeBlanc	2,286	33.83	-25.16
New Democratic	Habib Kilisli	688	10.18	+6.01
Green	Mary Ellen Carpenter	246	3.64	–
People's Alliance	Wendy Coughlin	108	1.60	–
Total valid votes		6,757	100.0	
Total rejected ballots		36	0.53	
Turnout		6,793	66.74	
Eligible voters		10,178		
Progressive Conservative gain from Liberal		Swing		+19.54
Source: Elections New Brunswick
