= Leonard Jones (politician) =

Canadian politician

Mayor of Moncton, New Brunswick
- In office April 1963 – June 1974
- Preceded by: Sherwood Rideout
- Succeeded by: Gary Wheeler

Member of Parliament for Moncton
- In office 1974–1979
- Preceded by: Charlie Thomas
- Succeeded by: Gary McCauley

Personal details
- Born: June 4, 1924 Moncton, New Brunswick
- Died: June 23, 1998 (aged 74)
- Party: Progressive Conservative and independent
- Profession: attorney

Leonard C. Jones, Jr. (June 4, 1924 – June 23, 1998) was a Canadian lawyer and politician, who served as mayor of the city of Moncton, New Brunswick, between 1963 and 1974, and Member of Parliament for the constituency of Moncton between 1974 and 1979.

== Political career ==
Jones was elected to Moncton City Council in 1957, and was voted mayor in 1963. He is best remembered for his opposition to the use of the French language in city business, requiring all council meetings to be conducted exclusively in English although the city is one-third francophone. In 1972, Jones rejected the use of bilingual municipal street signs. This frequently put him at odds with New Brunswick's Liberal Premier Louis Robichaud, who was concurrently adopting legislation recognizing the equality of the French language within the province. Conservative Premier Richard Hatfield, who succeeded Robichaud in 1970, regarded Jones as a bigot.

After Robichaud opened the Université de Moncton, a French-language university, in the city in 1964, Jones quickly became a target for frequent protests by students at the new school. Jones frequently decried the tactics of some Acadian protesters. The most publicized incident was in 1968, when two students delivered a severed pig head to Jones's house. The events of this period were chronicled in the 1971 documentary film Acadia, Acadia (L'Acadie, l'Acadie?!?!). Jones sued the CBC and the NFB for defamation.

With linguistic tensions high on both sides during the late 1960s and early 1970s, Jones remained popular with the anglophone majority in Moncton. He left the mayor's chair to run as a Progressive Conservative candidate in the 1974 federal election. After Jones won the nomination, party leader Robert Stanfield refused to sign Jones's nomination papers, citing his opposition to the party's policy of bilingualism. Jones ran instead as an independent candidate, and won with 46 percent of the vote. He decided not to run for a second term.

=== Electoral history ===
1974 Canadian federal election: Moncton—Riverview—Dieppe
Party	Candidate	Votes	%	±%
Independent	Leonard Jones	20,671	45.76	Ø
Liberal	Léonide Cyr	16,199	35.86	-3.91
Progressive Conservative	Charlie Thomas	6,456	14.29	-38.33
New Democratic	David Britton	1,501	3.32	-1.33
Social Credit	Bob Taylor	343	0.76	-2.20
Total valid votes		45,170		
