= Kate Elman Wilcott =

Canadian politician from New Brunswick

Kate Elman Wilcott MLA

Member of the New Brunswick Legislative Assembly for Saint John West-Lancaster
- Incumbent
- Assumed office October 21, 2024
- Preceded by: Dorothy Shephard

Personal details
- Party: Liberal

Kate Elman Wilcott is a Canadian politician, who was elected to the Legislative Assembly of New Brunswick in the 2024 election. She was elected in the riding of Saint John West-Lancaster.

Wilcott was the arts and culture coordinator for the city of Saint John prior to her election.

== Electoral record ==
2024 New Brunswick general election: Saint John West-Lancaster
Party	Candidate	Votes	%	±%
Liberal	Kate Elman Wilcott	3,525	46.53	+24.9
Progressive Conservative	Kim Costain	2,787	36.79	-18.0
Green	Joanna Killen	864	11.41	-2.5
New Democratic	Jane Ryan	330	4.36	+1.0
Libertarian	Sherie Vukelic	69	0.91	
Total valid votes		7,575	99.63	
Total rejected ballots		28	0.37	
Turnout		7,603	65.54	
Eligible voters		11,600		
Liberal gain from Progressive Conservative		Swing		+21.5
Source: Elections New Brunswick
