= Robert Goguen =

Canadian politician

Robert Goguen KC
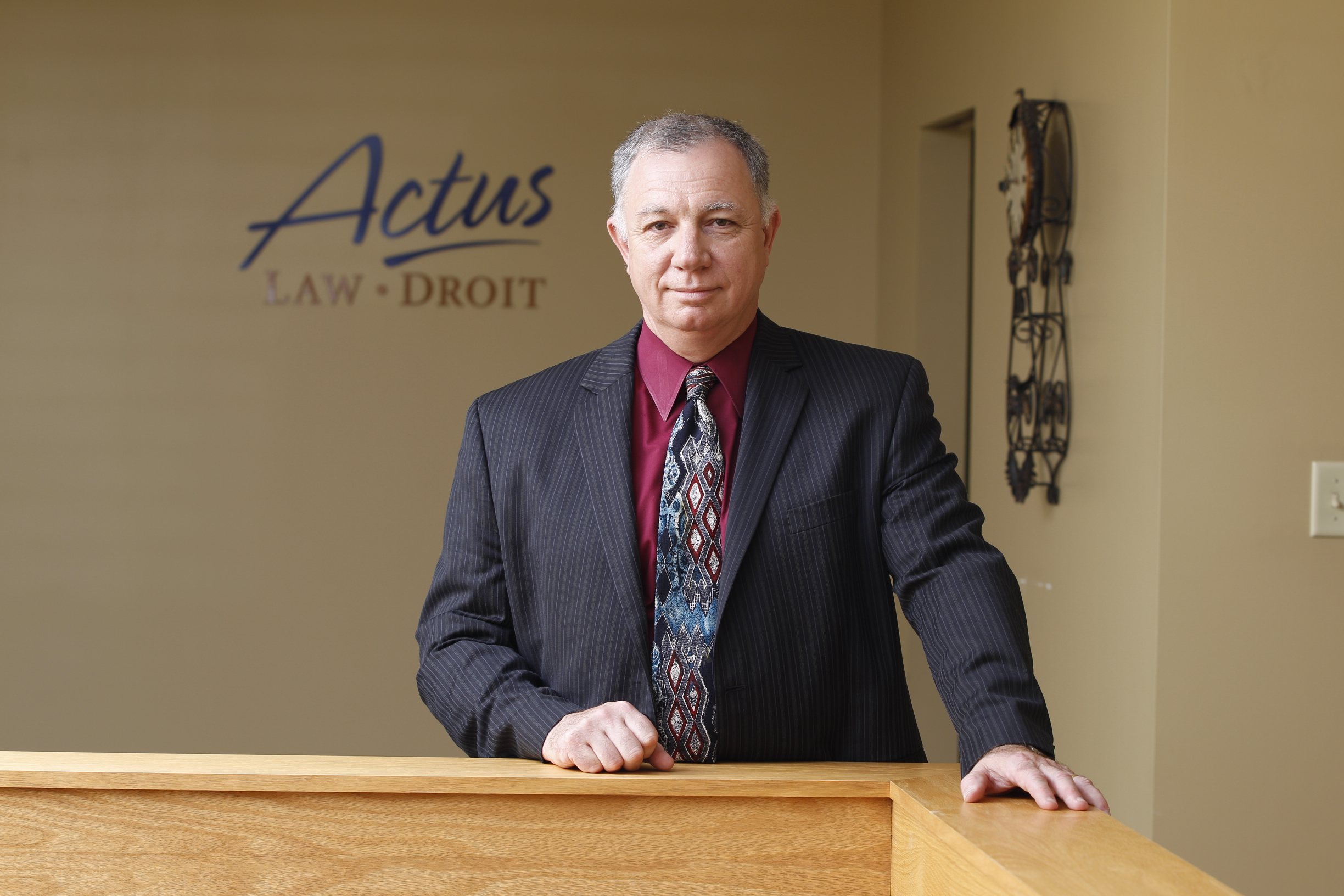

Member of the House of Commons of Canada for Moncton—Riverview—Dieppe
- In office May 2, 2011 – August 4, 2015
- Preceded by: Brian Murphy
- Succeeded by: Ginette Petitpas Taylor

Personal details
- Born: January 24, 1957 (age 69) Moncton, New Brunswick
- Party: Conservative
- Profession: Attorney

Robert R. Goguen KC (born January 24, 1957) is a former Canadian politician who served in the House of Commons of Canada from the 2011 election to the 2015 election. He represented the electoral district of Moncton—Riverview—Dieppe as a member of the Conservative Party. He served in the House of Commons as parliamentary secretary to the Minister of Justice and Attorney-General. He is the past president of the Progressive Conservative Party of New Brunswick

== Education ==
Goguen graduated from the Université de Moncton in 1980 with a Bachelor of Business Administration. He then graduated in 1983 from the Université de Moncton with a law degree. He worked as an attorney at Actus Law for over 25 years.

== Political career ==
Goguen is the past president of the Progressive Conservative Party of New Brunswick.

Goguen was elected member of Parliament (MP) for the Moncton—Riverview—Dieppe riding in the 2011 federal election, the first time a Conservative candidate had won the riding since 1988. He served as parliamentary secretary to the Minister of Justice and Attorney-General. Goguen ran for re-election in the 2015 federal election, placing second.

=== Controversy ===
Goguen was the subject of press attention in July 2014 after comments at a meeting of the House of Commons Justice Committee, when he asked a woman, Tímea Nagy, who was gang raped, if "the police authorities would have broken in and rescued you. Would your freedom of expression have been breached?." Many considered the question to be inappropriate, but both Nagy and the minister defended the question. Nagy has since said "I believe that MP Goguen’s question was awkward, but it was taken out of context. I was not personally offended."

== Personal life ==
Following his election defeat, Goguen returned to Actus Law. He and his wife Lori have three children.

== Electoral history ==
2015 Canadian federal election: Moncton—Riverview—Dieppe
Party	Candidate	Votes	%	±%	Expenditures
Liberal	Ginette Petitpas Taylor	30,054	57.75	+27.25	$63,968.39
Conservative	Robert Goguen	11,168	21.46	-15.30	$94,944.45
New Democratic	Luc LeBlanc	8,420	16.18	-12.28	$33,592.43
Green	Luc Melanson	2,399	4.61	+0.33	$9,724.74
Total valid votes/expense limit		52,041	100.00		$204,679.96
Total rejected ballots		311	0.59	-0.13	
Turnout		52,352	73.37	+8.20	
Eligible voters		71,350			
Liberal gain from Conservative		Swing		+21.28	
Source: Elections Canada

2011 Canadian federal election: Moncton—Riverview—Dieppe
Party	Candidate	Votes	%	±%	Expenditures
Conservative	Robert Goguen	17,408	35.73	-0.10	$80,064.71
Liberal	Brian Murphy	15,247	31.29	-7.84	$73,135.32
New Democratic	Shawna Gagné	14,053	28.84	+12.58	$4,680.44
Green	Steven Steeves	2,016	4.14	-4.65	$6,300.16
Total valid votes/expense limit		48,724	100.0		$85,477.25
Total rejected, unmarked and declined ballots		351	0.72	+0.21	
Turnout		49,075	65.17	+3.86	
Eligible voters		75,298			
Conservative gain from Liberal		Swing		+3.87	
