= Abel LeBlanc =

Canadian politician

MLA for Saint John Lancaster
- In office 2003–2010
- Preceded by: Norm McFarlane
- Succeeded by: Dorothy Shephard

Personal details
- Born: 1934 or 1935 (age 90–91) Saint John, New Brunswick
- Party: New Democratic Party
- Other political affiliations: Liberal (until 2014)
- Occupation: Longshoreman

Abel LeBlanc (born 1934 or 1935) is a politician in the province of New Brunswick, Canada. He was elected to the Legislative Assembly of New Brunswick in 2003.

He represented the electoral district of Saint John Lancaster as a Liberal.

LeBlanc was born in Saint John, New Brunswick, the son of Abel LeBlanc and Domitilde Gallant. He joined the Canadian Army and then went on to work at the Port of Saint John. On February 11, 2010, LeBlanc was expelled from the legislature following a verbal outburst, which included him giving two Tory MLAs the middle finger.

In June 2014, the New Brunswick New Democratic Party announced LeBlanc had joined, and he ran as their candidate in his former riding for that year's provincial election, placing third.
