= Shawn Crossman =

Canadian politician

His Worship Shawn Crossman

63rd Mayor of Moncton
- Incumbent
- Assumed office June 2, 2026
- Preceded by: Paulette Thériault (acting)

Personal details
- Children: 1
- Parent: Norm Crossman (father)

Shawn Crossman is a Canadian politician who has been mayor of Moncton since 2026. He previously served as a city councillor from 2012 to 2026.

Crossman previously worked in sales and marketing. As Ward 1's city councillor, he served as deputy mayor of the city. His father, Norm Crossman, was also a city councillor. In 2026, Crossman was elected mayor of Moncton, defeating Brian Murphy and Charles Leger.

== Electoral history ==
Candidate	Vote	%
Shawn Crossman	6,593	37.70
Brian F.P. Murphy	6,299	36.02
Charles Leger	4,189	23.95
Jeffrey McCluskey	408	2.33
