= George Rideout =

Canadian politician (born 1945)

The Honourable George S. Rideout

Member of Parliament for Moncton
- In office 21 November 1988 – 2 June 1997
- Preceded by: Dennis Cochrane
- Succeeded by: Claudette Bradshaw

Mayor of Moncton, New Brunswick
- In office May 1983 – December 1988
- Preceded by: Dennis Cochrane
- Succeeded by: Leopold Belliveau

Personal details
- Born: 2 January 1945 (age 81) Moncton, New Brunswick
- Party: Liberal
- Profession: Attorney

George Saunders Rideout (born 2 January 1945 in Moncton, New Brunswick) was a member of the House of Commons of Canada from 1988 to 1997. He was also the mayor of Moncton from 1983 to 1988. During his tenure as mayor, he laid the groundwork for Moncton's ascension as a regional hub of economic activity.

The son of two former federal Members of Parliament, Sherwood Rideout and Margaret Rideout, he was a lawyer by career, in practice with Stewart & Stratton and later Rideout & Robinson. Stepping down as mayor in 1988, he won election for the Liberal party that year and in the following elections in 1993, representing the Moncton electoral district. Rideout thus served in the 34th and 35th Canadian Parliaments and in doing so, gave the Rideout family the distinction of being one of the few in Canada to have three separate family members to hold the same riding.

Rideout did not seek a third term in Parliament and left federal politics in 1997. Shortly afterwards, he was appointed to the Court of Queen's Bench of New Brunswick, where he served until he retired at age 75.

== Electoral history ==
1993 Canadian federal election: Moncton—Riverview—Dieppe
Party	Candidate	Votes	%	±%
Liberal	George Rideout	33,790	66.47	+19.56
Progressive Conservative	Bernadette LeBlanc	7,199	14.16	-19.84
Reform	Clyde Woodworth	6,294	12.38	Ø
New Democratic	Gérard Snow	2,503	4.92	-4.74
Christian Heritage	Isaac Legere	561	1.10	-0.69
Natural Law	Ronald Openshaw	491	0.97	Ø
Total valid votes		50,838		

1988 Canadian federal election: Moncton—Riverview—Dieppe
Party	Candidate	Votes	%	±%
Liberal	George Rideout	23,823	46.91	+19.11
Progressive Conservative	Dennis Cochrane	17,267	34.00	-23.17
New Democratic	Terry Boudreau	4,904	9.66	-4.91
Confederation of Regions	Robert Hyslop	3,703	7.29	Ø
Christian Heritage	David Little	909	1.79	Ø
Independent	John Robert Gallant	175	0.34	Ø
Total valid votes		50,781		
