= Lorne Mitton =

Canadian mayor

Mayor of Moncton
- In office May, 2004 – May, 2008
- Preceded by: Brian Murphy

President of the Canadian Curling Association
- In office 1994–1995

Councillor-At-Large of the Moncton City Council
- In office 1998 – May, 2004

Deputy Mayor of Moncton
- In office 2000? – May 2004

Personal details
- Born: Moncton
- Spouse: Carolyn Duffy

Lorne M. Mitton is a former mayor of Moncton, New Brunswick, elected in May 2004. His predecessor was Brian Murphy. He was born and raised in Moncton, and studied at the University of Toronto. He has worked with organizations in the transportation industry including CN Rail, the Atlantic Provinces Transportation Commission, and the National Transportation Agency of Canada.

Prior to being elected Mayor, Mitton served the city as a Councillor At Large from 1998 to 2004 on Moncton City Council. During that time he was twice elected Deputy Mayor by his fellow Councillors.

Lorne Mitton announced in 2007 that he would not be re-offering in the next municipal election. Mitton officially retired in May 2008, and was succeeded by George LeBlanc, who was sworn into office on May 26, 2008.

He served as president of the Canadian Curling Association from 1994 to 1995.
