= Moncton—Dieppe =

Federal electoral district in New Brunswick, Canada

New Brunswick electoral district
- Interactive map of riding boundaries from the 2025 federal election
- Coordinates: 46.118°N 64.801°W

Federal electoral district
- Legislature: House of Commons
MP
Ginette Petitpas Taylor
Liberal
- District created: 1966
- First contested: 1968
- Last contested: 2025
- District webpage: profile, map

Demographics
- Population (2021): 100,237
- Electors (2025): 67,725
- Area (km²): 168
- Pop. density (per km²): 596.6
- Census division: Westmorland
- Census subdivision(s): Moncton, Dieppe (part)

Moncton—Dieppe (formerly known as Moncton—Riverview—Dieppe) is a federal electoral district in New Brunswick, Canada, that has been represented in the House of Commons of Canada since 1968.

== History ==
The riding of Moncton was created in 1966 when the district of Westmorland was split. The other riding is now called Beauséjour. The riding's initial area consisted of the city of Moncton and town of Dieppe, two parishes in Westmorland County (Moncton and Salisbury), and the Parish of Coverdale in Albert County.

As the Moncton area grew in population the riding shrank. The area of Albert County outside the town of Riverview was removed in 1976, a large area north of Moncton was removed in 1987, and the Petitcodiac and Salisbury areas were removed in 1997, to the point where the riding no longer has any largely rural areas. In 1998, Riverview and Dieppe were added to the riding's name. In 2003, the more suburban areas of Riverview and the southern part of Dieppe were removed. Finally, in 2014, the remaining suburban areas of Dieppe were given to Beauséjour.

The riding includes the entire city of Moncton and most of the town of Riverview and the city of Dieppe excluding the north east section, i.e., Melanson Road and up to the city limits.

The neighbouring ridings are Beauséjour and Fundy Royal.

As per the 2012 federal electoral redistribution, this riding lost 8% of its territory to Beauséjour.

Following the 2022 federal electoral redistribution, the riding lost the remainder of the Town of Riverview to Fundy Royal and gained the remainder of the City of Moncton from Beauséjour and Fundy Royal (2023 borders). This change came into effect upon the calling of the 2025 Canadian federal election.

== Demographics ==
Historical population
Year	Pop.	±%
2001	83,191	—
2006	89,334	+7.4%
2011 (2003 rep.)	98,539	+10.3%
2011 (2013 rep.)	89,484	−9.2%

According to the 2011 Canadian census; 2013 representation

Ethnic groups: 93.4% White, 2.0% Aboriginal, 1.6% Black
Languages: 63.6% English, 34.9% French
Religions: 78.3% Christian (47.8% Catholic, 8.9% Baptist, 7.9% United Church, 4.9% Anglican, 8.8% Other), 19.7% No religion
Median income (2010): $28,162
Average income (2010): $35,584

== Members of Parliament ==
Moncton has elected some well-known and controversial members of Parliament. Former mayor Leonard Jones, who took a tough stance against French language education, won the Progressive Conservative Party nomination for the 1974 election, but party leader Robert Stanfield refused to sign his nomination papers because of Jones' opposition to party policy on Official bilingualism. Jones ran and won as an independent candidate.

Dennis Cochrane, later the leader of the New Brunswick PC Party, represented the city for one term in the 1980s, and Conservative, Robert Goguen, is the riding's current representative in the House of Commons.

This riding has elected the following members of the House of Commons of Canada:

Parliament	Years	Member	Party
Moncton; Riding created from Westmorland
28th	1968–1972	Charlie Thomas	Progressive Conservative
29th	1972–1974	Charlie Thomas	Progressive Conservative
30th	1974–1979	Leonard Jones	Independent
31st	1979–1980	Gary McCauley	Liberal
32nd	1980–1984	Gary McCauley	Liberal
33rd	1984–1988	Dennis Cochrane	Progressive Conservative
34th	1988–1993	George Rideout	Liberal
35th	1993–1997	George Rideout	Liberal
Moncton—Riverview—Dieppe
36th	1997–2000	Claudette Bradshaw	Liberal
37th	2000–2004	Claudette Bradshaw	Liberal
38th	2004–2006	Claudette Bradshaw	Liberal
39th	2006–2008	Brian Murphy	Liberal
40th	2008–2011	Brian Murphy	Liberal
41st	2011–2015	Robert Goguen	Conservative
42nd	2015–2019	Ginette Petitpas Taylor	Liberal
43rd	2019–2021	Ginette Petitpas Taylor	Liberal
44th	2021–2025	Ginette Petitpas Taylor	Liberal
Moncton—Dieppe
45th	2025–present	Ginette Petitpas Taylor	Liberal

== Election results ==
Graph of election results in Moncton, Moncton—Riverview—Dieppe (1966-, minor parties that never got 2% of the vote or didn't run consistently are omitted)

=== Moncton—Dieppe ===
2025 Canadian federal election
Party	Candidate	Votes	%	±%
Liberal	Ginette Petitpas Taylor	30,215	63.00	+12.97
Conservative	Jocelyn Dionne	14,974	31.22	+8.63
New Democratic	Serge Landry	1,775	3.70	−13.10
Green	Marshall Dunn	994	2.07	−2.19
Total valid votes		47,958	99.26	
Total rejected ballots		356	0.74	+0.00
Turnout		48,314	71.05	+9.95
Eligible voters		68,004		
Liberal notional hold		Swing		+2.17
Source: Elections Canada
Note: number of eligible voters does not include voting day registrations.

2021 federal election redistributed results
Party	Vote	%
Liberal	20,347	50.03
Conservative	9,189	22.60
New Democratic	6,834	16.80
People's	2,563	6.30
Green	1,733	4.26
Free	1	0.00
Total valid votes	40,667	99.27
Rejected ballots	301	0.73
Registered voters/ estimated turnout	67,058	61.09

=== Moncton—Riverview—Dieppe ===
Graph of election results in Moncton—Riverview—Dieppe (1998-, minor parties that never got 2% of the vote or didn't run consistently are omitted)

2021 Canadian federal election: Moncton—Riverview—Dieppe
Party	Candidate	Votes	%	±%	Expenditures
Liberal	Ginette Petitpas Taylor	22,460	49.08	+6.13	$52,170.34
Conservative	Darlene Smith	10,692	23.36	-0.18	$75,384.79
New Democratic	Serge Landry	7,774	16.99	+5.1	$2,719.74
People's	Lorilee Carrier	2,901	6.34	+3.91	$0.00
Green	Richard Dunn	1,935	4.23	-13.69	$13,859.09
Total valid votes/expense limit		45,762	–	–	$108,536.34
Total rejected ballots					
Turnout			61.40	-8.22	
Registered voters		74,652			
Liberal hold		Swing		+3.16	
Source: Elections Canada

2019 Canadian federal election: Moncton—Riverview—Dieppe
Party	Candidate	Votes	%	±%	Expenditures
Liberal	Ginette Petitpas Taylor	22,261	42.95	-14.80	$57,476.19
Conservative	Sylvie Godin-Charest	12,200	23.54	+2.08	$71,897.56
Green	Claire Kelly	9,287	17.92	+13.31	$19,174.41
New Democratic	Luke MacLaren	6,164	11.89	-4.29	$2,074.25
People's	Stephen Driver	1,258	2.43		none listed
Animal Protection	Brad MacDonald	373	0.72		$2,145.15
Christian Heritage	Rhys Williams	285	0.55		$1,661.07
Total valid votes/expense limit		51,828	99.24		
Total rejected ballots		396	0.76	+0.17	
Turnout		52,224	69.63	-3.74	
Eligible voters		75,006			
Liberal hold		Swing		-8.44	
Source: Elections Canada

This riding lost territory to Beauséjour for the 42nd Canadian federal election.

2015 Canadian federal election: Moncton—Riverview—Dieppe
Party	Candidate	Votes	%	±%	Expenditures
Liberal	Ginette Petitpas Taylor	30,054	57.75	+27.25	$63,968.39
Conservative	Robert Goguen	11,168	21.46	-15.30	$94,944.45
New Democratic	Luc LeBlanc	8,420	16.18	-12.28	$33,592.43
Green	Luc Melanson	2,399	4.61	+0.33	$9,724.74
Total valid votes/expense limit		52,041	100.00		$204,679.96
Total rejected ballots		311	0.59	-0.13	
Turnout		52,352	73.37	+8.20	
Eligible voters		71,350			
Liberal gain from Conservative		Swing		+21.28	
Source: Elections Canada

2011 federal election redistributed results
Party	Vote	%
Conservative	16,327	36.76
Liberal	13,547	30.50
New Democratic	12,637	28.46
Green	1,899	4.28

2011 Canadian federal election: Moncton—Riverview—Dieppe
Party	Candidate	Votes	%	±%	Expenditures
Conservative	Robert Goguen	17,408	35.73	-0.10	$80,064.71
Liberal	Brian Murphy	15,247	31.29	-7.84	$73,135.32
New Democratic	Shawna Gagné	14,053	28.84	+12.58	$4,680.44
Green	Steven Steeves	2,016	4.14	-4.65	$6,300.16
Total valid votes/expense limit		48,724	100.0		$85,477.25
Total rejected, unmarked and declined ballots		351	0.72	+0.21	
Turnout		49,075	65.17	+3.86	
Eligible voters		75,298			
Conservative gain from Liberal		Swing		+3.87	

2008 Canadian federal election: Moncton—Riverview—Dieppe
Party	Candidate	Votes	%	±%	Expenditures
Liberal	Brian Murphy	17,797	39.13	-8.58	$73,263.48
Conservative	Daniel Allain	16,297	35.83	+5.72	$76,634.27
New Democratic	Carl Bainbridge	7,394	16.26	-2.67	$2,294.96
Green	Alison Ménard	3,998	8.79	+5.86	$4,619.17
Total valid votes/expense limit		45,486	100.0		$82,313
Total rejected, unmarked and declined ballots		286	0.51	-0.25	
Turnout		45,772	61.31	-5.56	
Eligible voters		74,660			
Liberal hold		Swing		-7.15	

2006 Canadian federal election: Moncton—Riverview—Dieppe
Party	Candidate	Votes	%	±%	Expenditures
Liberal	Brian Murphy	22,918	47.71	-11.58	$58,854.77
Conservative	Charles Doucet	14,464	30.11	+6.63	$73,054.40
New Democratic	David Hackett	9,095	18.93	+6.39	$9,194.74
Green	Camille Labchuk	1,409	2.93	-1.76	none listed
Canadian Action	Ron Pomerleau	150	0.31	–	$694.45
Total valid votes/expense limit		48,036	100.0		$76,083
Total rejected, unmarked and declined ballots		370	0.76	-0.02	
Turnout		48,406	66.87	+7.91	
Eligible voters		72,386			
Liberal hold		Swing		-9.10	

2004 Canadian federal election: Moncton—Riverview—Dieppe
Party	Candidate	Votes	%	±%	Expenditures
Liberal	Claudette Bradshaw	25,266	59.29	+0.29	$53,644.36
Conservative	Jean LeBlanc	10,003	23.48	-9.79	$51,960.12
New Democratic	Hélène LaPointe	5,344	12.54	+5.50	$4,202.78
Green	Judith Hamel	1,998	4.69	–	$1,224.96
Total valid votes/expense limit		42,611	100.0		$74,841
Total rejected, unmarked and declined ballots		336	0.78		
Turnout		42,947	58.96	-2.31	
Eligible voters		72,845			
Liberal notional hold		Swing		+5.04	
Changes from 2000 are based on redistributed results. Change for the Conservative Party is based on the combined results of its predecessors, the Canadian Alliance and the Progressive Conservatives.

2000 federal election redistributed results
Party	Vote	%
Liberal	23,432	59.00
Alliance	6,983	17.58
Progressive Conservative	6,231	15.69
New Democratic	2,795	7.04
Others	271	0.68

2000 Canadian federal election: Moncton—Riverview—Dieppe
Party	Candidate	Votes	%	±%
Liberal	Claudette Bradshaw	26,545	58.74	+14.18
Alliance	Kathryn Barnes	8,130	17.99	+5.01
Progressive Conservative	Serge Landry	7,082	15.67	-9.82
New Democratic	Hélène LaPointe	3,139	6.95	-9.10
Natural Law	Laurent Maltais	297	0.66	-0.25
Total valid votes		45,193		

Change for the Canadian Alliance are based on the 1997 results of its predecessor, the Reform Party.

=== Moncton ===
Graph of election results in Moncton (1966-1998, minor parties that never got 2% of the vote or didn't run consistently are omitted)

1997 Canadian federal election: Moncton—Riverview—Dieppe
Party	Candidate	Votes	%	±%
Liberal	Claudette Bradshaw	20,860	44.57	-21.90
Progressive Conservative	Linda Eaton	11,931	25.49	+11.33
New Democratic	Tom Barron	7,510	16.05	+11.13
Reform	Brent Steeves	6,073	12.98	+0.60
Natural Law	John Hogan	424	0.91	-0.06
		Total valid votes	46,798	

1993 Canadian federal election: Moncton—Riverview—Dieppe
Party	Candidate	Votes	%	±%
Liberal	George Rideout	33,790	66.47	+19.56
Progressive Conservative	Bernadette LeBlanc	7,199	14.16	-19.84
Reform	Clyde Woodworth	6,294	12.38	Ø
New Democratic	Gérard Snow	2,503	4.92	-4.74
Christian Heritage	Isaac Legere	561	1.10	-0.69
Natural Law	Ronald Openshaw	491	0.97	Ø
Total valid votes		50,838		

1988 Canadian federal election: Moncton—Riverview—Dieppe
Party	Candidate	Votes	%	±%
Liberal	George Rideout	23,823	46.91	+19.11
Progressive Conservative	Dennis Cochrane	17,267	34.00	-23.17
New Democratic	Terry Boudreau	4,904	9.66	-4.91
Confederation of Regions	Robert Hyslop	3,703	7.29	Ø
Christian Heritage	David Little	909	1.79	Ø
Independent	John Robert Gallant	175	0.34	Ø
Total valid votes		50,781		

1984 Canadian federal election: Moncton—Riverview—Dieppe
Party	Candidate	Votes	%	±%
Progressive Conservative	Dennis Cochrane	29,936	57.17	+22.26
Liberal	Gary McCauley	14,557	27.80	-20.16
New Democratic	Gregory Murphy	7,629	14.57	-2.14
Independent	Bob Kirk	243	0.46	Ø
Total valid votes		52,365		

1980 Canadian federal election: Moncton—Riverview—Dieppe
Party	Candidate	Votes	%	±%
Liberal	Gary McCauley	22,365	47.96	+4.63
Progressive Conservative	Dave Lockhart	16,277	34.91	-3.26
New Democratic	Gregory Murphy	7,791	16.71	-1.78
Independent	Raymond Léger	146	0.31	Ø
Marxist–Leninist	Nancy DesRosiers	51	0.11	Ø
Total valid votes		46,630		
lop.parl.ca

1979 Canadian federal election: Moncton—Riverview—Dieppe
Party	Candidate	Votes	%	±%
Liberal	Gary McCauley	20,940	43.33	+7.47
Progressive Conservative	Gary Wheeler	18,446	38.17	+23.88
New Democratic	Gregory Murphy	8,936	18.49	+15.17
Total valid votes		48,322		

1974 Canadian federal election: Moncton—Riverview—Dieppe
Party	Candidate	Votes	%	±%
Independent	Leonard Jones	20,671	45.76	Ø
Liberal	Léonide Cyr	16,199	35.86	-3.91
Progressive Conservative	Charlie Thomas	6,456	14.29	-38.33
New Democratic	David Britton	1,501	3.32	-1.33
Social Credit	Bob Taylor	343	0.76	-2.20
Total valid votes		45,170		

1972 Canadian federal election: Moncton—Riverview—Dieppe
Party	Candidate	Votes	%	±%
Progressive Conservative	Charlie Thomas	22,657	52.62	+2.52
Liberal	Myron Mitton	17,124	39.77	-2.09
New Democratic	Morrie Baum	2,003	4.65	-1.85
Social Credit	Bob Taylor	1,273	2.96	Ø
Total valid votes		43,057		

1968 Canadian federal election: Moncton—Riverview—Dieppe
Party	Candidate	Votes	%
Progressive Conservative	Charlie Thomas	17,969	50.10
Liberal	Margaret Rideout	15,013	41.86
New Democratic	Barrie N. Hould	2,332	6.50
Independent	R.F. Robinson	553	1.54
Total valid votes		35,867	

== See also ==
- List of Canadian electoral districts
- Historical federal electoral districts of Canada
