= Oliver Jones (businessman) =

Peter Brown

Mayor of Moncton
- In office 1859–1860

President of Westmorland Bank
- In office 1854–1867
- Preceded by: Bank established
- Succeeded by: Bank failure

Personal details
- Born: Oliver Jones; December 15, 1821 Head of Petitcodiac, New Brunswick
- Died: November 15, 1899 (aged 77) Moncton

Oliver Jones (December 15, 1821 – November 15, 1899) was a businessman, landowner and political figure in New Brunswick, Canada.

== Early life ==
He was born in Head of Petitcodiac (later Petitcodiac, New Brunswick), the son of Jacob Jones and Hannah Corey.

== Career and later life ==
Jones moved to the Bend of Petitcodiac (later Moncton) in 1839, where he bought property including a hotel and built the first wharf in 1841. His first wife was Elizabeth Steeves. Jones married two more times: marrying Catherine Garden Simpson in 1852 and Elizabeth Jane Beer in 1863. He had 22 children, five with his first wife, six with his second wife and eleven with his third.

In 1854, he helped establish the Westmorland Bank and he also served as its president until the bank's failure in 1867. With partners, Jones also established a tannery and a soap and candle factory. He served as mayor of Moncton in 1859-60. Jones also set up a shipbuilding company there that operated between 1863 and 1865. He died in Moncton after suffering a stroke at the age of 77. He was generally disliked and after his death, his family had to post guards at his vault in Elmwood Cemetery.
