= Frederick Reginald Pinfold Sumner =

English cleric

Frederick Reginald Pinfold Sumner was an English cleric who worked in a number of parishes in England. He entered the clergy in 1917 after university followed by training at Cuddesdon College, Oxford. Growing up in a devout household set him on the path to a career as a clergyman. Sumner was also a keen amateur photographer and photographs attributed to him appear in books and in photographic archives.

== Early life ==
Frederick Reginald Pinfold Sumner was born in the last quarter of 1892 in Reading, Berkshire.

His parents, Frederick Sumner (d.1936) and Elizabeth Sumner (née Rowe) came from the West Country of England and his elder sister Ethel was born in Portland, Dorset in 1888. Frederick senior was ordained as a priest after education at Clifton College, Bristol and Merton College, Oxford. Between 1892 and 1897 his clerical duties took him to Gloucestershire, Berkshire, where Frederick Reginald Pinfold (FRP) was born, and Kent, where his third child, Lillian, was born in 1899. In 1899 the family moved to London when Frederick senior was appointed Curate of St. Paul's, Onslow Square, South Kensington. In 1903 he was appointed Rector in Chawton, Devon before becoming the Vicar of St. Bartholomew's Church, Bristol in 1907. Frederick senior was to remain in this post for the rest of his working life.

=== Education ===
FRP attended his father's alma mater, Clifton College in Bristol. From here he entered Wadham College, Oxford in October 1913. He graduated with Fourth Class honours in English language and literature in 1916. After graduating from Wadham, Sumner entered Cuddesdon College, Oxford, a college for prospective clergy in the Anglo-Catholic tradition of the Church of England.

=== Marriage ===
Having started work as Deacon at his first parish in 1917 at Christchurch, High Wycombe, Sumner married Winifred Janet Emma Bailey later that same year in her birthplace of Kettering, Northamptonshire. They had two children, Mary Jane born in High Wycombe in 1918 and Pamela born in Mansfield in 1922.

=== Children ===
FRP's eldest child, Mary Jane, attended the local prep school in Newark, completing her secondary education at St. Mary's and St. Anne's in Abbots Bromley, Staffordshire. Mary Jane went on to study Art History at the Courtauld Institute of Art, London. At the commencement of the Second World War, Mary Jane was working at the Tate Gallery, London.

Sumner's other daughter, Pamela, married John PWH Davis, in 1942, a serving Second Lieutenant in the Royal Corps of Signals.Their relationship was cut short by the death of John in a car accident in June 1942.

== Working life ==
Having been ordained Priest in 1918, FRP left High Wycombe in 1920 to take up parishes in the Warsop Vale in Nottinghamshire. The first was in the village of Sookholme, the other in Warsop. The latter, a mining village, was home to the workers of Warsop Main Colliery. Here Sumner served at Warsop Vale Mission Church under the supervision of the Church of St. Peter and St. Paul.

FRP's next Nottinghamshire parish came in 1922 at St Peter's, Hucknall Torkard where he was Curate in Charge. in 1925 he was appointed Vicar of St. Leonard's, Newark, in the Diocese of Southwell and Nottingham, where he remained until early 1938. Here he became involved more widely in the local community, for example, as Honorary Chaplain of Newark Town & District Hospital & Dispensary.

FRP left St. Leonard's in early 1938 when he was made Rector of Bitterley, near Ludlow in Shropshire. This tenure was cut short by his death. He became unwell just after the Christmas of 1938 with what was thought to be seasonal influenza. However, he was suffering from acute heart disease and died at Ludlow Cottage Hospital in the afternoon of Saturday 21 January 1939 at 44, leaving behind his widow and two daughters, Pamela and Mary. His funeral was held at Bitterley on Wednesday 25 January, a separate memorial service also being held for him at his former church of St. Leonard's on the same day

A stained glass window, designed by G. Webb, dedicated to his memory was installed in St. Leonard's Church. The inscription reads 'In memory of Frederick R. Pinfold Sumner / vicar of this parish A.D. 1925-1938.' The window is now (2020) in the new church as the original church building no longer exists.

== The Sumners' photographic legacy ==
=== A father and son partnership ===
Sumner's father had been a keen photographer, particularly of ecclesiastical architecture. In 1907 Frederick Snr. registered his copyright for some photographs of the church in Chawleigh, Devon. He had served as Rector there prior to his appointment as Vicar of St. Bartholomew's Church, Bristol and this church had its own Rambling and Photographic Club.

Photographs by Sumner senior and FRP were included in Francis Bond's 'An Introduction to English Church Architecture: From the Eleventh to the Sixteenth Century'. First published in 1913, the location for these photographs was mainly in the south west of England though images were also included from southern and south eastern counties. It is possible that father and son collaborated on such expeditions.

Other examples of photographs attributed to father and son can be found in 'Pulpits, Lecterns, & Organs in English Churches' by J Charles Cox,; 'Bench-Ends in English Churches, by J. Charles Cox; 'Early English Furniture & Woodwork, Vol. I', by Herbert Cescinsky and Ernest R. Gribble. The locations are mainly in the south west of the country, in particular Devon, though in the last of these there are three images taken by Sumner senior in Ranworth, Norfolk.

=== Photographs in publications ===
- Photographs attributed to Sumner senior and FRP are to be found in later publications including in multiple volumes of the series by Nikolaus Pevsner, The Buildings of England. It is, however, unclear, which of the two photographers is cited. Two examples of this lack of clarity appear in Pevsner's Bedfordshire and the County of Huntingdon and Peterborough, where Rev. Sumner is credited and in The Buildings of England: Wiltshire where Mrs. F Sumner is credited. This raises the intriguing prospect that FRP's wife could have held a copyright on the image or took the photograph herself.
- Photographs taken by FRP are used in T. G. Barber, Hucknall Torkard Church: Its History and Byron Association (1925). Sumner was well placed to have photographs included as he was Curate in Charge of St Peter's in Hucknall Torkard from 1922 to 1925.
- Photographs in Hugh Braun, Historical Architecture: The Development of Structure and Design (London: Faber, 1953) are attributed to "Sumner".
- Photographs in Fred H. Crossley, Timber Building in England (London: B T Batsford, 1951) are credited to Rev F R Pinford Sumner.
- Photographs credited to J. R. Sumner appear in A. P. Baggs and M. C. Siraut, A History of the County of Somerset: Volume 6, Andersfield, Cannington, and North Petherton Hundreds (Bridgwater and Neighbouring Parishes), ed. R. W. Dunning and C. R. Elrington (London, 1992).
- Photographs taken by FRP appear in Kenneth John Conant, Carolingian and Romanesque Architecture, 800 to 1200 (Yale University Press, 1993).

An article in The Horfield and Bishopston Record and Montepelier & District Free Press (a Bristol-based newspaper) dated 13 June 1930 reported a talk given by Sumner senior about a visit to Northern Spain where he praised the provision for tourists, including local tourist officers, for introductions to senior clergy and facilitating his taking of photographs.

On 12 November 1938 FRP gave a lecture at Bitterley, Shropshire, where he was then based, about a recent visit to Spain, which was "illustrated by the rector's own photographs made into slides."

=== Images in photographic archives ===
The Courtauld Institute of Art, London, holds a collection of images in the Conway Library, which are attributed to FRP in locations in France, Spain, Italy, Belgium, Morocco, Greece and Croatia, though it is not clear when he visited these places.

Historic England holds the FRP Sumner Collection where 905 images are attributed to him. The Collection comprises the interiors and exteriors of parish churches primarily in Wiltshire and Somerset with other examples in Devon, South Yorkshire, Nottinghamshire, Oxfordshire, Warwickshire, Suffolk, West and East Sussex, Gloucestershire, Kent, Norfolk, Leicestershire, Herefordshire, Dorset, the Isle of Wight, Derbyshire, Cornwall, Bristol, Avon, and Lincolnshire. There are also two prints of buildings in Ireland.
