= Brian Murphy (politician) =

Canadian politician

Brian F.P. Murphy, K.C.
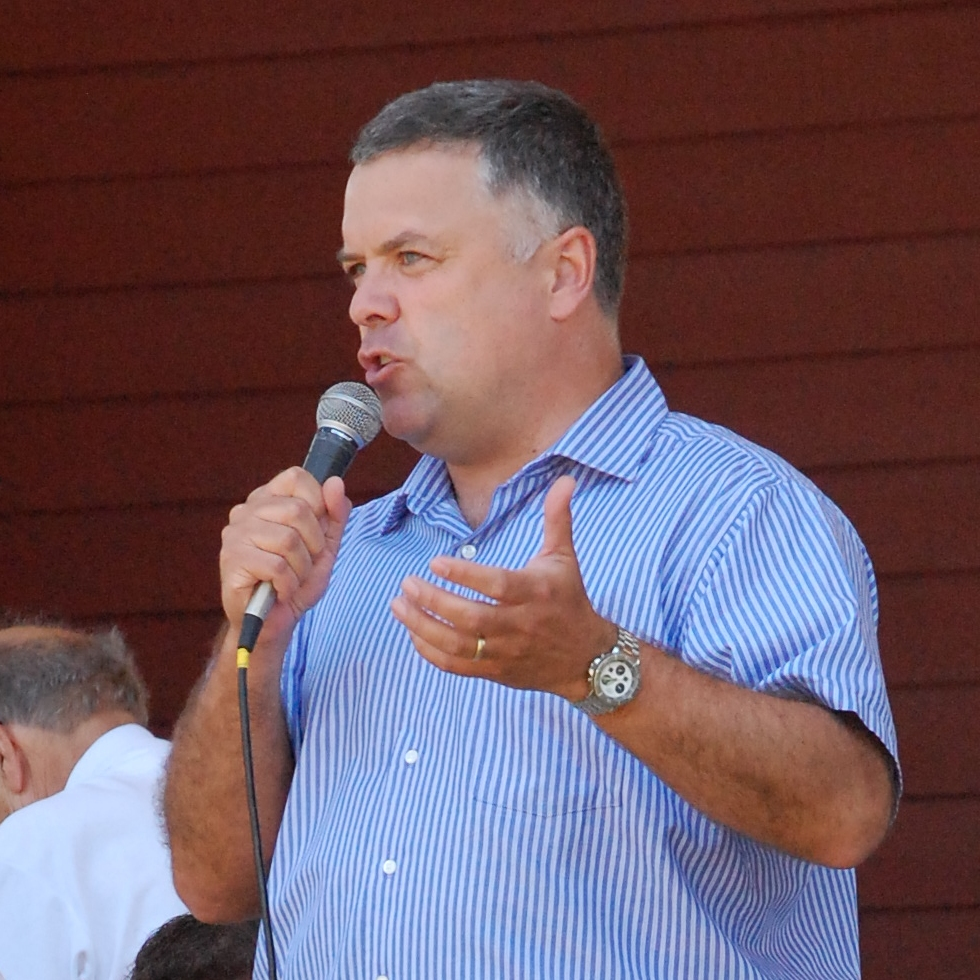

MP for Moncton—Riverview—Dieppe
- In office 2006–2011
- Preceded by: Claudette Bradshaw
- Succeeded by: Robert Goguen

Mayor of Moncton, New Brunswick
- In office 1998 – May 2004
- Preceded by: Leopold Belliveau
- Succeeded by: Lorne Mitton

Personal details
- Born: March 17, 1961 (age 65) Moncton, New Brunswick
- Party: Liberal
- Spouse: Jacqueline Murphy
- Profession: Lawyer

Brian F. P. Murphy, KC (born March 17, 1961) is a former mayor of Moncton from 1998 to 2004, and was the Liberal Member of the House of Commons of Canada for Moncton—Riverview—Dieppe from 2006 to 2011.

Murphy was born in Moncton, New Brunswick. His family has produced several politicians. Before being elected mayor, he served on city council from 1992 to 1998. Murphy was elected mayor in 1998, defeating the incumbent Leopold Belliveau, and was acclaimed for re-election in 2001. As mayor in 2002, he spearheaded the declaration of Moncton as Canada's first officially bilingual (English and French) city.

He did not contest the 2004 municipal election. He was first elected to parliament in the 2006 federal election where he succeeded Claudette Bradshaw.

In the leadership election called to replace Paul Martin as leader of the Liberal Party, he supported Bob Rae.

Murphy was re-elected in the 2008 federal election. In the 2011 election, he was defeated by Conservative Robert Goguen. He again ran for mayor in 2026, being defeated by Shawn Crossman.

== Federal election results ==
2011 Canadian federal election: Moncton—Riverview—Dieppe
Party	Candidate	Votes	%	±%	Expenditures
Conservative	Robert Goguen	17,408	35.73	-0.10	$80,064.71
Liberal	Brian Murphy	15,247	31.29	-7.84	$73,135.32
New Democratic	Shawna Gagné	14,053	28.84	+12.58	$4,680.44
Green	Steven Steeves	2,016	4.14	-4.65	$6,300.16
Total valid votes/expense limit		48,724	100.0		$85,477.25
Total rejected, unmarked and declined ballots		351	0.72	+0.21	
Turnout		49,075	65.17	+3.86	
Eligible voters		75,298			
Conservative gain from Liberal		Swing		+3.87	

2008 Canadian federal election: Moncton—Riverview—Dieppe
Party	Candidate	Votes	%	±%	Expenditures
Liberal	Brian Murphy	17,797	39.13	-8.58	$73,263.48
Conservative	Daniel Allain	16,297	35.83	+5.72	$76,634.27
New Democratic	Carl Bainbridge	7,394	16.26	-2.67	$2,294.96
Green	Alison Ménard	3,998	8.79	+5.86	$4,619.17
Total valid votes/expense limit		45,486	100.0		$82,313
Total rejected, unmarked and declined ballots		286	0.51	-0.25	
Turnout		45,772	61.31	-5.56	
Eligible voters		74,660			
Liberal hold		Swing		-7.15	

2006 Canadian federal election: Moncton—Riverview—Dieppe
Party	Candidate	Votes	%	±%	Expenditures
Liberal	Brian Murphy	22,918	47.71	-11.58	$58,854.77
Conservative	Charles Doucet	14,464	30.11	+6.63	$73,054.40
New Democratic	David Hackett	9,095	18.93	+6.39	$9,194.74
Green	Camille Labchuk	1,409	2.93	-1.76	none listed
Canadian Action	Ron Pomerleau	150	0.31	–	$694.45
Total valid votes/expense limit		48,036	100.0		$76,083
Total rejected, unmarked and declined ballots		370	0.76	-0.02	
Turnout		48,406	66.87	+7.91	
Eligible voters		72,386			
Liberal hold		Swing		-9.10	
