= Ivan Court =

Canadian politician (1949–2025)

76th Mayor of Saint John, New Brunswick
- In office May 28, 2008 – May 28, 2012
- Preceded by: Norm McFarlane
- Succeeded by: Mel Norton

Personal details
- Born: October 21, 1949 Saint John, New Brunswick, Canada
- Died: October 28, 2025 (aged 76) Saint John, New Brunswick, Canada
- Party: Independent (2008–2012) (Note: Municipal politicians in Saint John run on a Nonpartisan basis)
- Other political affiliations: Liberal
- Profession: Teacher; administrator

Ivan Court (October 21, 1949 – October 28, 2025) was a Canadian politician who served as the 65th mayor of Saint John, New Brunswick in Canada from May 28, 2008 to May 28, 2012. He was succeeded by Mel Norton.

Ivan Court was born in Saint John, New Brunswick on October 21, 1949.

In 2014, Court attempted a run in provincial politics in the riding of Saint John Lancaster and said he believed he had the credentials to improve the situation for the people of his riding. "I served 14 years on Common Council, ten as a Councillor and four as the mayor", Court said. "I was involved heavily in sports. I believe I have the knowledge base. I worked with the Ministers of Local Government. I don't think there's a politician right now in Fredericton that has my experience working at the national, provincial and municipal levels." However, he was unsuccessful, losing the Liberal nomination to former city councillor Peter McGuire.

He died at Saint John Regional Hospital, on October 28, 2025, at the age of 76.

== See also ==
- List of mayors of Saint John, New Brunswick
- Saint John City Council
