= Moncton City Council =

Coordinates: 46°05′23″N 64°46′31″W

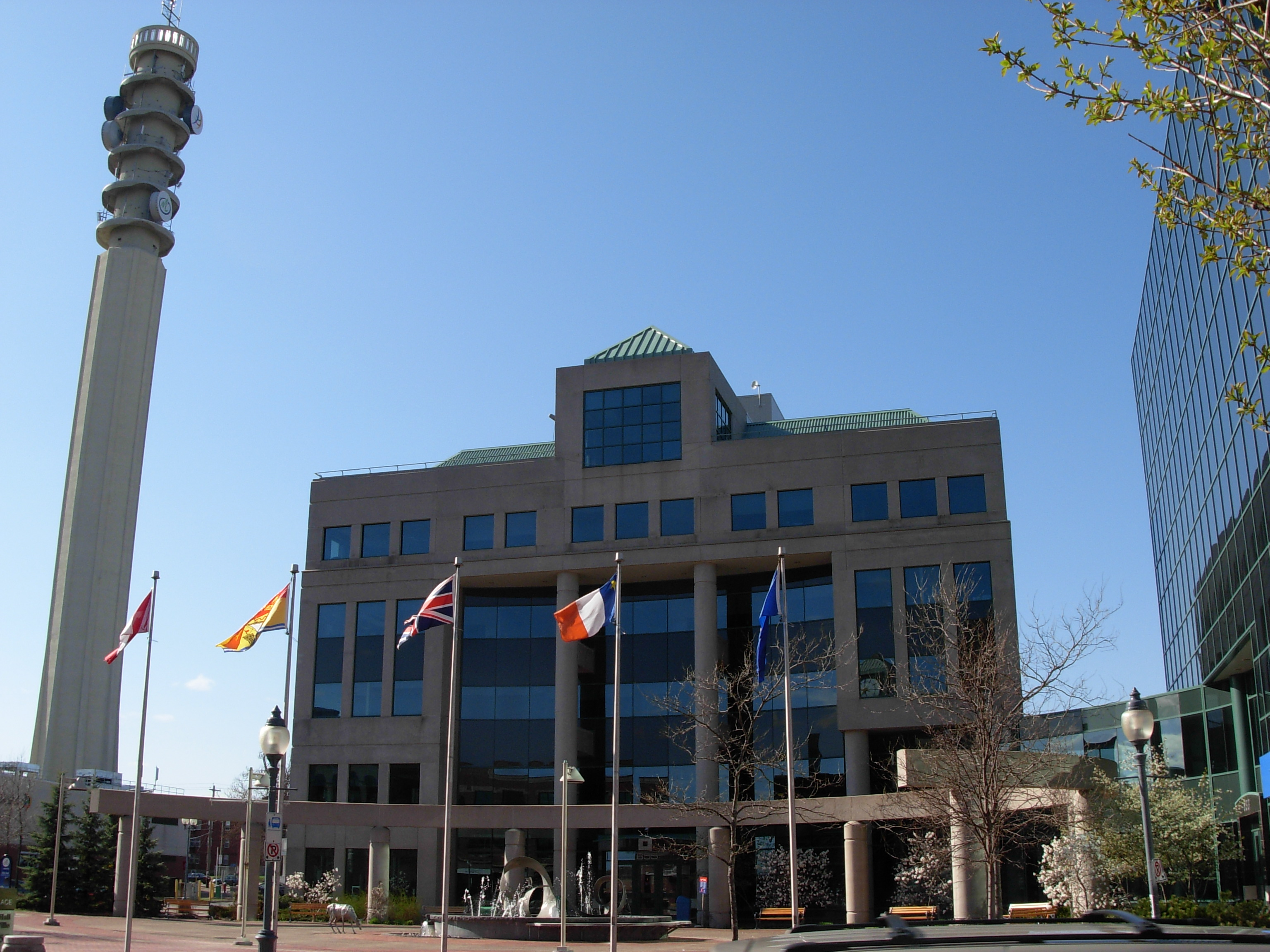
Moncton City Hall

Moncton City Council (French: Conseil municipal de Moncton) is the governing body of the City of Moncton, New Brunswick, Canada. It consists of a mayor and ten councillors elected to four-year terms. The council is non-partisan with the mayor serving as the chairman, casting a ballot only in cases of a tie vote. There are four wards electing two councillors each with an additional two councillors selected at-large by the general electorate. Day-to-day operation of the city is under the control of a city manager.

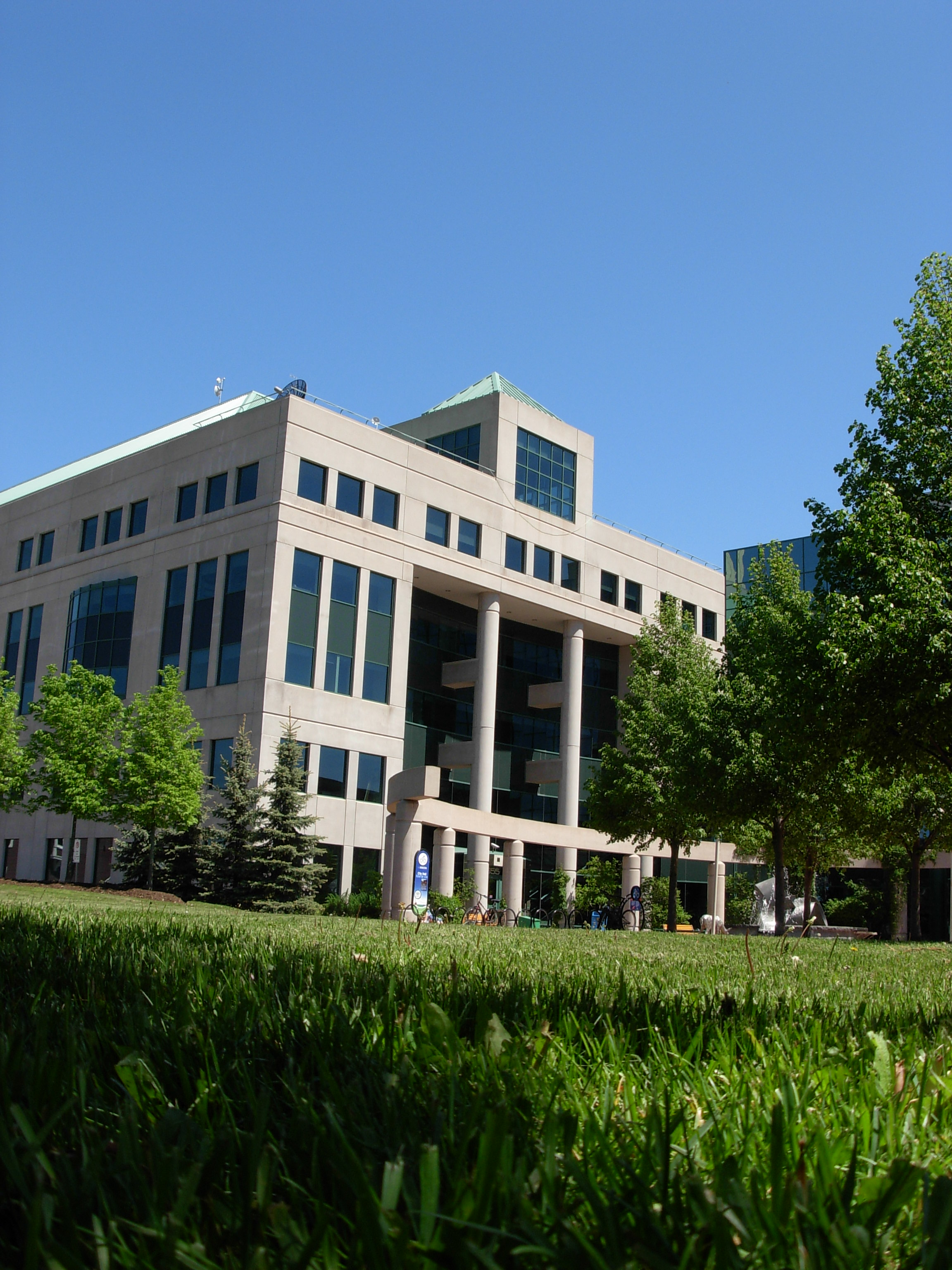
Moncton's City Hall is a modern 6-storey building, constructed in 1996.

== City council members (2026–present) ==
Elected May 11, 2026

- Mayor: Shawn Crossman
- Marty Kingston (at-large)
- Greg Turner (at-large)
- Mike Gaudet (Ward 1)
- Felix LeBlanc (Ward 1)
- Marc Leger (Ward 2)
- Kristin Cavoukian (Ward 2)
- Julianna Mutch (Ward 3)
- Bryan Butler (Ward 3)
- Paul Richard (Ward 4)
- Kate Doyle (Ward 4)

== City council members (2021–2026) ==
Elected May 11, 2021:

- Mayor: Dawn Arnold (until March 7, 2025)
- Monique LeBlanc (at-large)
- Marty Kingston (at-large)
- Shawn Crossman (Ward 1)
- Paulette Thériault (Ward 1) (acting mayor from March 7, 2025)
- Daniel Bourgeois (Ward 2)
- Charles Léger (Ward 2)
- Bryan Butler (Ward 3)
- Dave Steeves (Ward 3)
- Paul Richard (Ward 4)
- Susan F. Edgett (Ward 4)

== City council members (2016–2021) ==
Elected May 10, 2016:

- Mayor: Dawn Arnold
- Greg Turner (2016-20). Seat became vacant in 2020 due to Turner being elected to the Legislative Assembly of New Brunswick.
- Pierre Boudreau (at-large)
- Shawn Crossman (Ward 1)
- Paulette Thériault (Ward 1)
- Blair Lawrence (Ward 2)
- Charles Leger (Ward 2)
- Bryan Butler (Ward 3)
- Brian Hicks (Ward 3. Elected 2018 to replace Rob McKee, who was elected to the Legislative Assembly of New Brunswick.)
- Paul A. Pellerin (Ward 4)
- Susan F. Edgett (Ward 4. Elected November 15, 2016, to replace René Landry, who died August 2, 2016.)

== City council members (2012–2016) ==
- Mayor: George H. LeBlanc
- Dawn Arnold (at-large)
- Pierre Boudreau (at-large)
- Shawn Crossman (Ward 1)
- Paulette Thériault (Ward 1)
- Merrill Henderson (Ward 2, died 2014)
- Blair Lawrence (Ward 2, elected 2014 to replace Merrill Henderson)
- Charles Leger (Ward 2)
- Brian A. Hicks (Ward 3)
- Daniel Bourgeois (Ward 3)
- René Landry (Ward 4)
- Paul A. Pellerin (Ward 4)

== City council members (2008–2012) ==
- Mayor: George H. LeBlanc
- Kathryn M. Barnes (at-large)
- Pierre Boudreau (at-large)
- Steven Boyce (Ward 1)
- Paulette Thériault (Ward 1)
- Merrill Henderson (Ward 2)
- Nancy L. Hoar (Ward 2)
- Brian A. Hicks (Ward 3)
- Daniel Bourgeois (Ward 3)
- René Landry (Ward 4)
- Paul A. Pellerin (Ward 4)
