= Saint John West-Lancaster =

Provincial electoral district in New Brunswick, Canada

Coordinates: 45.2528°N 66.1247°W

New Brunswick electoral district
- The riding of Saint John West-Lancaster (as it exists from 2023) in relation to other New Brunswick electoral districts

Provincial electoral district
- Legislature: Legislative Assembly of New Brunswick
MLA
Kate Elman Wilcott
Liberal
- District created: 1994
- First contested: 1995
- Last contested: 2024

Demographics
- Population (2011): 13,904
- Electors (2013): 11,143

Saint John West-Lancaster (French: Saint-Jean-Ouest-Lancaster) is a provincial electoral district for the Legislative Assembly of New Brunswick, Canada. The riding was created prior to the 1995 election as Saint John Lancaster. It was renamed Saint John West-Lancaster following the 2023 redistribution.

The riding name refers to Lancaster, New Brunswick.

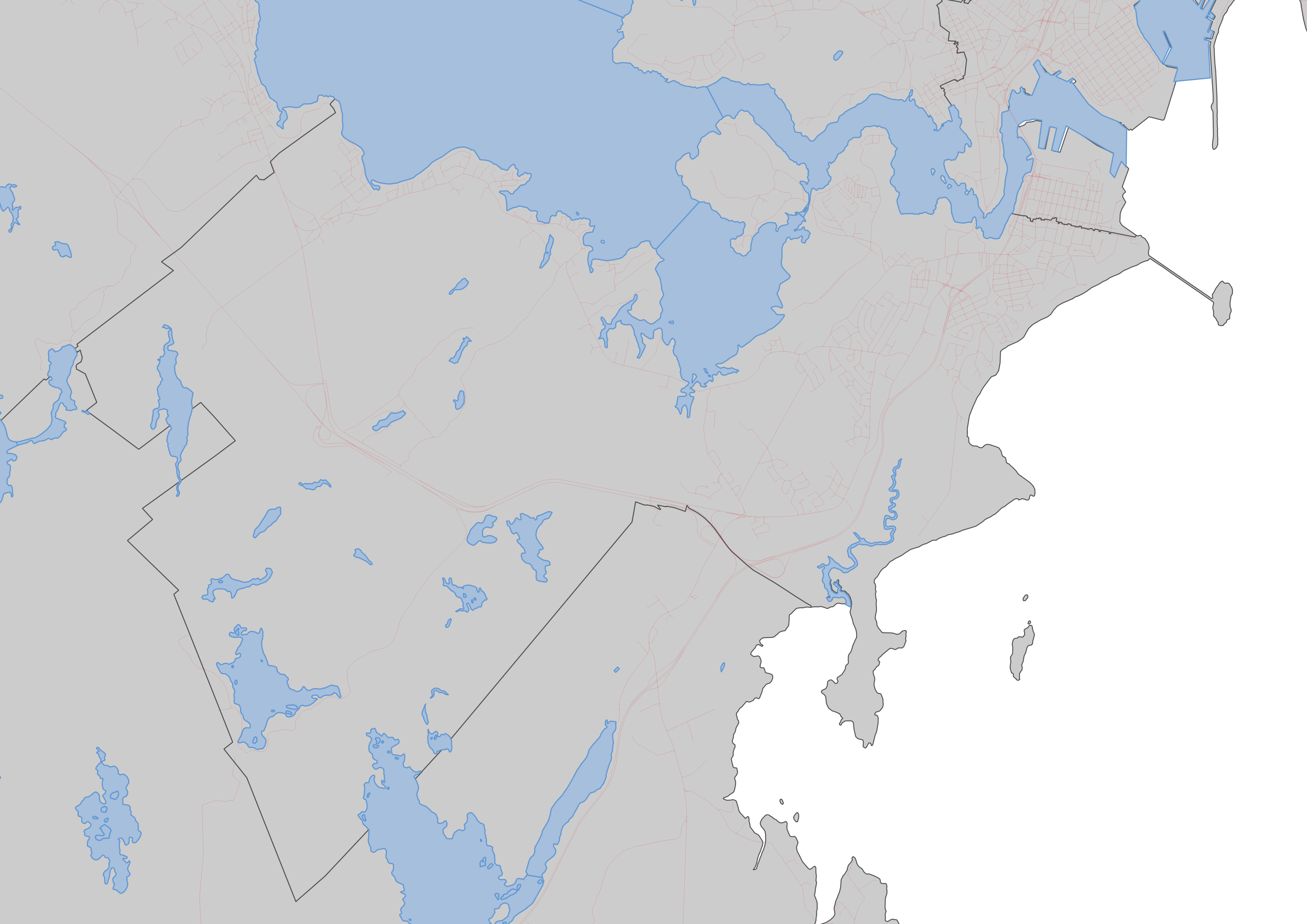
Saint John West-Lancaster (as it exists from 2023) and the roads in the riding

== Members of the Legislative Assembly ==
Assembly	Years	Member	Party
Saint John Lancaster; Riding created from Saint John West and Saint John Harbour (1974–1995)
53rd	1995–1999	Jane Barry	Liberal
54th	1999–2003	Norm McFarlane	Progressive Conservative
55th	2003–2006	Abel LeBlanc	Liberal
56th	2006–2010	Abel LeBlanc	Liberal
57th	2010–2014	Dorothy Shephard	Progressive Conservative
58th	2014–2018	Dorothy Shephard	Progressive Conservative
58th	2018–2020	Dorothy Shephard	Progressive Conservative
60th	2020–2024	Dorothy Shephard	Progressive Conservative
Saint John West-Lancaster
61st	2024–Present	Kate Elman Wilcott	Liberal

== Election results ==
2024 New Brunswick general election
Party	Candidate	Votes	%	±%
Liberal	Kate Elman Wilcott	3,525	46.53	+24.9
Progressive Conservative	Kim Costain	2,787	36.79	-18.0
Green	Joanna Killen	864	11.41	-2.5
New Democratic	Jane Ryan	330	4.36	+1.0
Libertarian	Sherie Vukelic	69	0.91	
Total valid votes		7,575	99.63	
Total rejected ballots		28	0.37	
Turnout		7,603	65.54	
Eligible voters		11,600		
Liberal gain from Progressive Conservative		Swing		+21.5
Source: Elections New Brunswick

2020 provincial election redistributed results
Party	%
Progressive Conservative	54.8
Liberal	21.6
Green	13.9
People's Alliance	6.3
New Democratic	3.4

2020 New Brunswick general election
Party	Candidate	Votes	%	±%
Progressive Conservative	Dorothy Shephard	3,560	54.24	+9.08
Liberal	Sharon Teare	1,471	22.41	-3.58
Green	Joanna Killen	938	14.29	+5.53
People's Alliance	Paul Seelye	394	6.00	-7.87
New Democratic	Don Durant	201	3.06	-3.17
Total valid votes		6,564	99.73	
Total rejected ballots		18	0.27	+0.02
Turnout		6,582	62.67	-0.04
Eligible voters		10,502		
Progressive Conservative hold		Swing		+6.33

2018 New Brunswick general election
Party	Candidate	Votes	%	±%
Progressive Conservative	Dorothy Shephard	3,001	45.15	+5.97
Liberal	Kathleen Riley-Karamanos	1,727	25.99	-6.35
People's Alliance	Paul Seelye	922	13.87	--
Green	Doug James	582	8.76	+4.53
New Democratic	Tony Mowery	414	6.23	-16.74
Total valid votes		6,646	99.74	
Total rejected ballots		17	0.26	
Turnout		6,663	62.72	
Eligible voters		10,624		

2014 New Brunswick general election
Party	Candidate	Votes	%	±%
Progressive Conservative	Dorothy Shephard	2,619	39.18	-11.57
Liberal	Peter McGuire	2,162	32.34	-1.49
New Democratic	Abel LeBlanc	1,535	22.97	+12.79
Green	Ashley Durdle	283	4.23	+0.59
Independent	Mary Ellen Carpenter	85	1.27	–
Total valid votes		6,684	100.0	
Total rejected ballots		19	0.28	
Turnout		6,703	62.67	
Eligible voters		10,696		
Progressive Conservative notional hold		Swing		-5.04
Independent candidate Mary Ellen Carpenter lost 2.37 percentage points from her performance in the 2010 election as a Green candidate. New Democratic candidate Abel LeBlanc lost 10.86 percentage points from his performance in the 2010 election as a Liberal candidate.
Source: Elections New Brunswick

2010 New Brunswick general election
Party	Candidate	Votes	%	±%
Progressive Conservative	Dorothy Shephard	3,429	50.75	+13.91
Liberal	Abel LeBlanc	2,286	33.83	-25.16
New Democratic	Habib Kilisli	688	10.18	+6.01
Green	Mary Ellen Carpenter	246	3.64	–
People's Alliance	Wendy Coughlin	108	1.60	–
Total valid votes		6,757	100.0	
Total rejected ballots		36	0.53	
Turnout		6,793	66.74	
Eligible voters		10,178		
Progressive Conservative gain from Liberal		Swing		+19.54
Source: Elections New Brunswick

2006 New Brunswick general election
Party	Candidate	Votes	%	±%
Liberal	Abel LeBlanc	4,002	58.99	+17.61
Progressive Conservative	Peter Hyslop	2,499	36.84	-0.19
New Democratic	Jennifer Carkner	283	4.17	-15.03
Total valid votes		6,784	100.0	
Liberal hold		Swing		+8.90

2003 New Brunswick general election
Party	Candidate	Votes	%	±%
Liberal	Abel LeBlanc	2,942	41.38	+11.72
Progressive Conservative	Norm McFarlane	2,633	37.03	-17.13
New Democratic	Walter Lee	1,365	19.20	+6.40
Grey	Jim Webb	170	2.39	–
Total valid votes		7,110	100.0	
Liberal gain from Progressive Conservative		Swing		+14.42
Grey Party candidate Jim Webb gained 0.30 percentage points from his performance in the 1999 election as a Confederation of Regions candidate.

1999 New Brunswick general election
Party	Candidate	Votes	%	±%
Progressive Conservative	Norm McFarlane	3,999	54.16	+16.56
Liberal	Jane Barry	2,190	29.66	-11.89
New Democratic	Walter Lee	945	12.80	-1.69
Confederation of Regions	Jim Webb	154	2.09	-0.93
Natural Law	Christopher B. Collrin	96	1.30	+0.61
Total valid votes		7,384	100.0	
Progressive Conservative gain from Liberal		Swing		+14.22

1995 New Brunswick general election
Party	Candidate	Votes	%	±%
Liberal	Jane Barry	2,954	41.55	
Progressive Conservative	Norm McFarlane	2,673	37.60	
New Democratic	Kenneth W. Wilcox	1,030	14.49	
Confederation of Regions	Peter A. Whitebone	215	3.02	
Independent	Richard Phillip Gerrior	188	2.64	
Natural Law	Christopher B. Collrin	49	0.69	
Total valid votes		7,109	100.0	

== See also ==
- List of New Brunswick provincial electoral districts
- Canadian provincial electoral districts
