= Jane Barry =

Canadian politician

Pamela Jane Barry (born July 10, 1944) is a chemist and former politician in New Brunswick. She represented Saint John West and then Saint John Lancaster in the Legislative Assembly of New Brunswick from 1987 to 1999 as a Liberal member.

== Biography ==
=== Early years ===
She was born in Halifax, Nova Scotia and was educated at Mount St. Vincent University and Saint Francis Xavier University, receiving a B.Sc.

=== Career ===
Barry worked as a chemist for Lantic Sugar Limited and as a research assistant at the University of Alberta Faculty of Pharmacy. She served in the province's Executive Council as Minister of State for Childhood Services, Minister of the Environment and Solicitor General. Barry was defeated in the 1999 general election.

From 2000 to 2011, Barry was the executive director of The Greater Saint John Community Foundation.

New Brunswick provincial government of Ray Frenette
Cabinet post (1)
Predecessor	Office	Successor
herself in McKenna government	Solicitor General; 1997–1998	James E. Lockyer
New Brunswick provincial government of Frank McKenna
Cabinet posts (2)
Predecessor	Office	Successor
Bruce A. Smith	Solicitor General; 1994–1997	herself in Frenette government
Vaughn Blaney	Minister of the Environment; 1991–1994	Marcelle Mersereau
