= René Landry =

Canadian politician

Pepsi Landry

Member of the Moncton City Council
- In office 2004–2006

Member of the Legislative Assembly of New Brunswick for Moncton North
- In office 1999–2003

Personal details
- Citizenship: Canadian
- Party: Progressive Conservative
- Spouse: Jacqueline Gagnon

René "Pepsi" Landry (21 May 1937 – 2 August 2016) was a political figure in New Brunswick, Canada. He represented Moncton North in the Legislative Assembly of New Brunswick as a Progressive Conservative member.

He was born in Moncton, New Brunswick, the son of Léonie LeBlanc and Wilfred Landry. Landry was educated at the University of Ottawa, the Université de Moncton and Sir George Williams University. He worked for the Moncton Boys and Girls Club and then worked as a facilities coordinator for the city of Moncton. He married Jacqueline Gagnon. His bid for reelection to the provincial assembly in 2003 was unsuccessful.

In 2004, Landry was elected to the Moncton City Council. He was named to the New Brunswick Human Rights Commission in 2006.
