= George LeBlanc =

Canadian politician (1955–2026)

George H. LeBlanc

Mayor of Moncton, New Brunswick
- In office May 26, 2008 – May 2016
- Preceded by: Lorne Mitton
- Succeeded by: Dawn Arnold

Personal details
- Born: January 4, 1955 Moncton, New Brunswick, Canada
- Died: February 3, 2026 (aged 71) Moncton, New Brunswick, Canada
- Party: Liberal
- Children: 2
- Profession: Lawyer, Cox & Palmer

George H. LeBlanc (January 4, 1955 – February 3, 2026) was a Canadian politician who served as the mayor of Moncton, New Brunswick. He was elected in the Moncton municipal election of May 12, 2008. He was sworn into office on May 26, 2008, and was re-elected in 2012.

On January 27, 2015, LeBlanc announced his candidacy for the federal Liberal nomination in Moncton—Riverview—Dieppe for the 2015 federal election. On March 28, LeBlanc was defeated for the nomination by Ginette Petitpas Taylor. On January 4, 2016, LeBlanc announced he would not re-offer in the 2016 municipal election.

LeBlanc died from complications of corticobasal syndrome in Moncton, on February 3, 2026, at the age of 71.
