= Dennis Cochrane =

Canadian politician

Dennis Cochrane CM

Leader of the Progressive Conservative Party of New Brunswick
- In office 1991–1995

Member of the Legislative Assembly of New Brunswick
- In office 1991–1995
- In office 1984–1988

Mayor of Moncton
- In office 1979–1983

President and Vice-Chancellor of St. Thomas University (New Brunswick)
- In office 2009–2011
- Preceded by: Michael W. Higgins
- Succeeded by: Dawn Russell

Deputy Minister Education of Nova Scotia
- In office 1999–2009

Personal details
- Born: 26 October 1950 (age 74) Moncton, New Brunswick, Canada
- Political party: Progressive Conservative Party of New Brunswick

Dennis H. Cochrane (born 26 October 1950) is a Canadian politician and civil servant.

He graduated from the New Brunswick Teacher's College in 1970, received a Bachelor of Arts degree from the University of New Brunswick in 1974, received a Bachelor of Education in 1974 and a Master of Education in 1981 from the University of Moncton.

He was elected to the Moncton City Council in 1977 and he was elected Mayor of Moncton in 1979, being re-elected in 1980. In 1983, he was Councillor-at-Large of Moncton. He was elected to the House of Commons of Canada representing the riding of Moncton in the 1984 as a Progressive Conservative (PC). He was defeated in 1988.

He next entered provincial politics and was elected in 1991 as leader of the Progressive Conservative Party of New Brunswick. In this role he regained seats for his party in the 1991 election, the PCs having been shut out in the 1987 election. Though his party won only three seats, it gained others later through by-elections and seemed poised to win, at least, official opposition status in the coming election. The opposition Confederation of Regions Party was suffering internal strife and a number of its members chose to sit as independents. Cochrane invited them to join the PC caucus; however, they declined and one of the Acadian members quit in protest. As a result, Cochrane resigned the leadership in 1995.

Following the victory of the Progressive Conservative Party of Nova Scotia in 1999 election, he was named deputy minister of Education for the neighbouring province of Nova Scotia.

He resigned at the end of 2009 when he accepted a position as Interim President and Vice Chancellor of St. Thomas University (New Brunswick) effective January 2010, replacing outgoing Michael W. Higgins. This appointment continued until 1 July 2011, when he was succeeded by Dawn Russell.

He was named to the Order of Canada in 2013.

== Electoral history ==
1988 Canadian federal election: Moncton—Riverview—Dieppe
Party	Candidate	Votes	%	±%
Liberal	George Rideout	23,823	46.91	+19.11
Progressive Conservative	Dennis Cochrane	17,267	34.00	-23.17
New Democratic	Terry Boudreau	4,904	9.66	-4.91
Confederation of Regions	Robert Hyslop	3,703	7.29	Ø
Christian Heritage	David Little	909	1.79	Ø
Independent	John Robert Gallant	175	0.34	Ø
Total valid votes		50,781		

1984 Canadian federal election: Moncton—Riverview—Dieppe
Party	Candidate	Votes	%	±%
Progressive Conservative	Dennis Cochrane	29,936	57.17	+22.26
Liberal	Gary McCauley	14,557	27.80	-20.16
New Democratic	Gregory Murphy	7,629	14.57	-2.14
Independent	Bob Kirk	243	0.46	Ø
Total valid votes		52,365		

Political offices
Preceded by Barbara Baird Filliter	Leader of the Progressive Conservative Party of New Brunswick; 1991–1995	Succeeded by Bernard Valcourt
