= Frederick W. Sumner =

Canadian politician

Frederick William Sumner (April 12, 1855 – November 20, 1919) was a merchant and political figure in New Brunswick, Canada. He represented Westmorland County in the Legislative Assembly of New Brunswick from 1895 to 1899 as a Conservative member.

He was born in Moncton, New Brunswick and educated in Moncton and Truro, Nova Scotia. Sumner married Margaret T. McEwan. He was a hardware merchant and was also involved in production and export of lumber. Sumner served six terms as mayor of Moncton. He also served as Agent-General for New Brunswick. He ran unsuccessfully for a seat in the House of Commons in 1908.

Two of his former homes in Moncton were designated Local Historic Places.
