= 43rd New Brunswick Legislature =

The 43rd New Brunswick Legislative Assembly represented New Brunswick between February 21, 1957, and May 13, 1960.

David Laurence MacLaren was Lieutenant-Governor of New Brunswick in 1957. He was succeeded by Joseph Leonard O'Brien in May 1958.

J. Arthur Moore was chosen as speaker.

The Progressive Conservative Party led by Hugh John Flemming formed the government.

== Members ==
Electoral District	Name	Party	First elected / previously elected
Albert	Claude D. Taylor	Progressive Conservative	1952
Albert	Everett Newcomb	Progressive Conservative	1952
Carleton	Hugh J. Flemming	Progressive Conservative	1944
Carleton	Fred A. McCain	Progressive Conservative	1952
Carleton	Harrison Monteith	Progressive Conservative	1952
Charlotte	C. Douglas Everett	Progressive Conservative	1952
Charlotte	Norman Buchanan	Progressive Conservative	1952
Charlotte	Lorne B. Groom (Note: resigned seat)	Progressive Conservative	1952
Charlotte	Gale S. McLaughlin	Progressive Conservative	1956
Gloucester	Ernest Richard	Liberal	1948
Gloucester	Michel Fournier	Liberal	1945
Gloucester	Claude Savoie	Liberal	1956
Gloucester	Joseph E. Connolly	Liberal	1940
Gloucester	Frederick C. Young	Liberal	1944
Kent	Louis J. Robichaud	Liberal	1952
Kent	André F. Richard	Liberal	1956
Kent	Hugh A. Dysart	Liberal	1952
Kings	Cyril B. Sherwood	Progressive Conservative	1952
Kings	R. Gordon L. Fairweather	Progressive Conservative	1952
Kings	Harry N. Jonah	Progressive Conservative	1956
Madawaska	Edgar Fournier	Progressive Conservative	1952
Madawaska	Lucien Fortin	Progressive Conservative	1952
Madawaska	William M. Bird	Progressive Conservative	1952
Moncton	Joseph W. Bourgeois	Progressive Conservative	1952
Moncton	T. Babbitt Parlee (Note: died in 1957)	Progressive Conservative	1952
Northumberland	William J. Gallant	Liberal	1952
Northumberland	Richard J. Gill	Liberal	1930
Northumberland	P. C. Price	Liberal	1956
Northumberland	Joseph R. Martin	Progressive Conservative	1956
Queens	Wilfred Bishop	Progressive Conservative	1952
Queens	J. Arthur Moore	Progressive Conservative	1925, 1939, 1952
Restigouche	Roger Pichette	Progressive Conservative	1952
Restigouche	Fred Somers	Progressive Conservative	1952
Restigouche	Douglas Pettigrew	Progressive Conservative	1952
Saint John City	Arthur E. Skaling	Progressive Conservative	1952
Saint John City	Donald D. Patterson	Progressive Conservative	1952
Saint John City	George E. McInerney	Progressive Conservative	1952
Saint John City	George L. Keith	Progressive Conservative	1956
Saint John County	Arthur W. Carton	Progressive Conservative	1952
Saint John County	Robert McAllister	Progressive Conservative	1931, 1952
Sunbury	Paul Fearon	Progressive Conservative	1952
Sunbury	Paul Mersereau	Progressive Conservative	1952
Victoria	J. Stewart Brooks	Progressive Conservative	1952
Victoria	Leon B. Rideout	Progressive Conservative	1956
Westmorland	Joseph E. Leblanc	Liberal	1952
Westmorland	Cléophas Léger	Liberal	1952
Westmorland	Donald C. Harper	Liberal	1952
Westmorland	Austin C. Taylor (Note: named to Senate)	Liberal	1935
York	J.F. McInerney	Progressive Conservative	1952
York	C. Weldon Lawrence	Progressive Conservative	1952
York	Harry Ames	Progressive Conservative	1952
York	William J. West	Progressive Conservative	1952

== Notes ==
Preceded by 42nd New Brunswick Legislature	Legislative Assemblies of New Brunswick; 1957–1960	Succeeded by 44th New Brunswick Legislature
