= 42nd New Brunswick Legislature =

The 42nd New Brunswick Legislative Assembly represented New Brunswick between February 11, 1953, and April 17, 1956.

David Laurence MacLaren served as Lieutenant-Governor of New Brunswick.

E. T. Kennedy was chosen as speaker in 1953. After Kennedy died, Walter Powers succeeded him as speaker in 1954. J. Arthur Moore became speaker in 1955 after Powers' death.

The Progressive Conservative Party led by Hugh John Flemming defeated the Liberals to form the government.

== Members ==
Electoral District	Name	Party	First elected / previously elected
Albert	Everett Newcomb	Progressive Conservative	1952
Albert	Claude D. Taylor	Progressive Conservative	1952
Carleton	Hugh J. Flemming	Progressive Conservative	1944
Carleton	Fred A. McCain	Progressive Conservative	1952
Carleton	Harrison Monteith	Progressive Conservative	1952
Charlotte	Norman Buchanan	Progressive Conservative	1952
Charlotte	C. Douglas Everett	Progressive Conservative	1952
Charlotte	Lorne B. Groom	Progressive Conservative	1952
Charlotte	Vance R. Huntley	Progressive Conservative	1952
Gloucester	J. André Doucet	Liberal	1923
Gloucester	Joseph E. Connolly	Liberal	1940
Gloucester	Frederick C. Young	Liberal	1944
Gloucester	Michel Fournier	Liberal	1945
Gloucester	Ernest Richard	Liberal	1948
Kent	Hugh A. Dysart	Liberal	1952
Kent	Isaie Melanson	Liberal	1939
Kent	Louis J. Robichaud	Liberal	1952
Kings	Cyril B. Sherwood	Progressive Conservative	1952
Kings	Gordon L. Fairweather	Progressive Conservative	1952
Kings	Elmore T. Kennedy (Note: died in 1953)	Progressive Conservative	1939
Madawaska	William M. Bird	Progressive Conservative	1952
Madawaska	Lucien Fortin	Progressive Conservative	1952
Madawaska	Edgar Fournier	Progressive Conservative	1952
Moncton	Joseph W. Bourgeois	Progressive Conservative	1952
Moncton	T. Babbitt Parlee	Progressive Conservative	1952
Northumberland	William S. Anderson	Liberal	1930
Northumberland	William J. Gallant	Liberal	1952
Northumberland	Richard J. Gill	Liberal	1930
Northumberland	H. S. Murray	Liberal	1944
Queens	Wilfred Bishop	Progressive Conservative	1952
Queens	J. Arthur Moore	Progressive Conservative	1925, 1939, 1952
Restigouche	Douglas Pettigrew	Progressive Conservative	1952
Restigouche	Roger Pichette	Progressive Conservative	1952
Restigouche	Fred Somers	Progressive Conservative	1952
Saint John City	Donald D. Patterson	Progressive Conservative	1952
Saint John City	Arthur E. Skaling	Progressive Conservative	1952
Saint John City	Harold S. Prince	Progressive Conservative	1952
Saint John City	George E. McInerney	Progressive Conservative	1952
Saint John County	Arthur W. Carton	Progressive Conservative	1952
Saint John County	Robert McAllister	Progressive Conservative	1931, 1952
Sunbury	Paul Fearon	Progressive Conservative	1952
Sunbury	Paul Mersereau	Progressive Conservative	1952
Victoria	J. Stewart Brooks	Progressive Conservative	1952
Victoria	Walter V. Powers (Note: died in 1954)	Progressive Conservative	1952
Westmorland	Donald C. Harper	Liberal	1952
Westmorland	Joseph E. Leblanc	Liberal	1952
Westmorland	Cléophas Léger	Liberal	1952
Westmorland	Austin C. Taylor	Liberal	1935
York	Harry Ames	Progressive Conservative	1952
York	C. Weldon Lawrence	Progressive Conservative	1952
York	John F. McInerney	Progressive Conservative	1952
York	William J. West	Progressive Conservative	1952

== Notes ==
Preceded by 41st New Brunswick Legislature	Legislative Assemblies of New Brunswick; 1952–1956	Succeeded by 43rd New Brunswick Legislature
