= 44th New Brunswick Legislature =

Legislative assembly in Canada

The 44th New Brunswick Legislative Assembly represented New Brunswick between November 17, 1960, and March 12, 1963.

Joseph Leonard O'Brien was Lieutenant-Governor of New Brunswick.

Ernest Richard was chosen as speaker.

The Liberal Party led by Louis Robichaud defeated the Progressive Conservatives to form the government. The Liberals promised, among other things, to reform sales of alcoholic beverages, to build a canal across the Isthmus of Chignecto, and to re-open the moose hunt.

== Members ==
Electoral District	Name	Party	First elected / previously elected
Albert	Claude D. Taylor	Progressive Conservative	1952
Albert	Everett Newcombe	Progressive Conservative	1952
Carleton	Fred A. McCain	Progressive Conservative	1952
Carleton	Edison Stairs	Progressive Conservative	1960
Carleton	Hugh J. Flemming (Note: elected to federal seat)	Progressive Conservative	1944
Carleton	Richard B. Hatfield (1961)	Progressive Conservative	1961
Charlotte	Kenneth J. Webber	Liberal	1960
Charlotte	Henry G. Irwin	Liberal	1960
Charlotte	Leon G. Small	Liberal	1960
Charlotte	Alfred Hawkins	Liberal	1960
Gloucester	Michel Fournier	Liberal	1945
Gloucester	Ernest Richard	Liberal	1948
Gloucester	Claude Savoie	Liberal	1956
Gloucester	H. H. Williamson	Liberal	1960
Gloucester	Bernard A. Jean	Liberal	1960
Kent	Louis J. Robichaud	Liberal	1952
Kent	Hugh A. Dysart	Liberal	1952
Kent	André F. Richard	Liberal	1956
Kings	R. Gordon L. Fairweather	Progressive Conservative	1952
Kings	Cyril B. Sherwood	Progressive Conservative	1952
Kings	Harry N. Jonah (Note: named a judge)	Progressive Conservative	1956
Kings	John B. M. Baxter, Jr. (1962)	Progressive Conservative	1962
Kings	George E. Horton (1962)	Progressive Conservative	1962
Madawaska	Laurier Lévesque	Liberal	1960
Madawaska	J. Adrien Lévesque	Liberal	1960
Madawaska	Jean Marc Michaud	Liberal	1960
Moncton	L.G. DesBrisay	Liberal	1960
Moncton	Gilbert Robichaud	Liberal	1960
Northumberland	Clarence S. Menzies	Liberal	1960
Northumberland	Graham Crocker	Liberal	1960
Northumberland	Norbert Thériault	Liberal	1960
Northumberland	Paul B. Lordon (Note: resigned seat)	Liberal	1960
Northumberland	J. Fraser Kerr (1961)	Liberal	1961
Queens	Wilfred Bishop	Progressive Conservative	1952
Queens	J. Arthur Moore	Progressive Conservative	1925, 1939, 1952
Restigouche	Georges L. Dumont	Liberal	1960
Restigouche	John D. Alexander	Liberal	1960
Restigouche	Patrick Guérette	Liberal	1960
Saint John City	Donald D. Patterson	Progressive Conservative	1952
Saint John City	George L. Keith	Progressive Conservative	1956
Saint John City	George E. McInerney	Progressive Conservative	1952
Saint John City	R. M. Pendrigh	Progressive Conservative	1960
Saint John County	C. A. McIlveen	Progressive Conservative	1960
Saint John County	Parker D. Mitchell	Progressive Conservative	1960
Sunbury	R. Lee MacFarlane	Liberal	1960
Sunbury	William R. Duffie	Liberal	1960
Victoria	T. E. Duffie	Liberal	1960
Victoria	J. Stewart Brooks	Progressive Conservative	1952
Westmorland	Joseph E. Leblanc	Liberal	1952
Westmorland	Donald C. Harper	Liberal	1952
Westmorland	Cléophas Léger	Liberal	1952
Westmorland	Percy Mitton	Liberal	1960
York	Harry Ames	Progressive Conservative	1952
York	George Everett Chalmers	Progressive Conservative	1960
York	C. Weldon Lawrence	Progressive Conservative	1952
York	J. F. McInerney	Progressive Conservative	1952

== Notes ==
Preceded by 43rd New Brunswick Legislature	Legislative Assemblies of New Brunswick; 1960–1963	Succeeded by 45th New Brunswick Legislature
