= Northumberland (New Brunswick provincial electoral district) =

Defunct provincial electoral district in New Brunswick, Canada

New Brunswick electoral district

Defunct provincial electoral district
- Legislature: Legislative Assembly of New Brunswick
- District created: 1785
- District abolished: 1973
- First contested: 1785
- Last contested: 1970

Northumberland was a provincial electoral district for the Legislative Assembly of New Brunswick, Canada. It roughly encompassed Northumberland County, New Brunswick. The district used a bloc voting system to elect multiple members. It was abolished in the 1973 electoral redistribution when the province moved to first-past-the-post single-member ridings.

== Members of the Legislative Assembly ==
Legislature	Years	Member	Party	Member	Party	Member	Party	Member	Party	Member	Party
1st	1786 – 1792	Elias Hardy	Ind.	William Davidson	Ind.						
2nd	1793 – 1795	Ward Chipman	Ind.	John Black	Ind.						
3rd	1795 – 1802	James Fraser	Ind.	Samuel Lee	Ind.						
4th	1802 – 1809	James Fraser	Ind.	Alexander Taylor	Ind.						
5th	1809 – 1816	James Fraser	Ind.	Alexander Taylor	Ind.						
6th	1817 – 1819	James Fraser	Ind.	Richard Simonds	Ind.						
7th	1820	Joseph Saunders	Ind.	Richard Simonds	Ind.						
8th	1821 – 1827	Hugh Munro	Ind.	Richard Simonds	Ind.						
9th	1827 – 1830	Alexander Rankin	Ind.	Richard Simonds	Ind.						
10th	1831 – 1833	Alexander Rankin	Ind.	Joseph Cunard	Ind.						
10th	1833 – 1834	Alexander Rankin	Ind.	John Ambrose Street	Ind.						
11th	1835 – 1837	Alexander Rankin	Ind.	John Ambrose Street	Ind.						
12th	1837 – 1842	Alexander Rankin	Ind.	John Ambrose Street	Ind.						
13th	1843	Alexander Rankin	Ind.	John T. Williston	Ind.						
13th	1843 – 1846	Alexander Rankin	Ind.	John Ambrose Street	Ind.						
14th	1847 – 1850	Alexander Rankin	Ind.	John Ambrose Street	Ind.	William Carman	Ind.	Martin Cranney	Ind.		
15th	1851 – 1852	Alexander Rankin	Ind.	John Ambrose Street	Ind.	John Mercer Johnson	Ind.	John T. Williston	Ind.		
15th	1852 – 1854	Peter Mitchell	Ind.	John Ambrose Street	Ind.	John Mercer Johnson	Ind.	John T. Williston	Ind.		
16th	1854 – 1856	George Kerr	Ind.	John Ambrose Street	Ind.	John Mercer Johnson	Ind.	Richard Sutton	Ind.		
17th	1856 – 1857	George Kerr	Ind.	Peter Mitchell	Ind.	John Mercer Johnson	Ind.	Richard Sutton	Ind.		
18th	1857 – 1861	George Kerr	Ind.	Peter Mitchell	Ind.	John Mercer Johnson	Ind.	Richard Sutton	Ind.		
19th	1862 – 1865	George Kerr	Ind.	Robinson Crocker	Ind.	John Mercer Johnson	Ind.	Edward Williston	Ind.		
20th	1865 – 1866	George Kerr	Ind.	Richard Hutchison	Ind.	Richard Sutton	Ind.	Edward Williston	Ind.		
21st	1866 – 1867	George Kerr	Cons.	John Mercer Johnson	Ind.	Richard Sutton	Ind.	Edward Williston	Ind.		
21st	1867 – 1870	George Kerr	Cons.	William Moore Kelly	Ind.	Richard Sutton	Ind.	Edward Williston	Ind.		
22nd	1870 – 1874	Jacob C. Gough	Ind.	William Moore Kelly	Ind.	Michael Adams	Cons.	Thomas F. Gillespie	Cons.		
23rd	1875 – 1878	William Swim	Ind.	William Moore Kelly	Ind.	Lemuel John Tweedie	Lib.	Allan A. Davidson	Cons.		
24th	1879 – 1882	Michael Adams	Cons.	Ernest Hutchinson	Ind.	Thomas F. Gillespie	Cons.	Allan A. Davidson	Cons.		
25th	1883 – 1886	Michael Adams	Cons.	William A. Park	Lib.-Con.	Thomas F. Gillespie	Cons.	John Percival Burchill	Lib.		
26th	1886 – 1887	Michael Adams	Cons.	William A. Park	Lib.-Con.	Lemuel John Tweedie	Lib.	Ernest Hutchinson	Ind.		
26th	1887 – 1888	John Percival Burchill	Lib.	William A. Park	Lib.-Con.	Lemuel John Tweedie	Lib.	Ernest Hutchinson	Ind.		
26th	1888 – 1890	John Percival Burchill	Lib.	John Morrissy	Lib.	Lemuel John Tweedie	Lib.	Ernest Hutchinson	Ind.		
27th	1890 – 1892	John Percival Burchill	Lib.	James Robinson	Cons.	Lemuel John Tweedie	Lib.	John O'Brien	Lib.-Con.		
28th	1892 – 1895	John Percival Burchill	Lib.	James Robinson	Cons.	Lemuel John Tweedie	Lib.	John O'Brien	Lib.-Con.		
29th	1896	John Percival Burchill	Lib.	James Robinson	Cons.	Lemuel John Tweedie	Lib.	John O'Brien	Lib.-Con.		
29th	1896 – 1899	John Percival Burchill	Lib.	Allan A. Davidson	Cons.	Lemuel John Tweedie	Lib.	John O'Brien	Lib.-Con.		
30th	1899 – 1903	John Percival Burchill	Lib.	Charles Elijah Fish	Cons.	Lemuel John Tweedie	Lib.	John O'Brien	Lib.-Con.		
31st	1903 – 1905	John Morrissy	Lib.	W. S. Loggie	Lib.	Lemuel John Tweedie	Lib.	Donald Morrison	Cons.		
31st	1905 – 1908	John Morrissy	Lib.	Robert Murray	Lib.	Lemuel John Tweedie	Lib.	Donald Morrison	Cons.		
32nd	1908	John Morrissy	Lib.	William L. Allain	Ind.	Daniel P. MacLachlan	Ind.	Donald Morrison	Cons.		
32nd	1908 – 1912	John Morrissy	Lib.	William L. Allain	Ind.	Daniel P. MacLachlan	Ind.	John Percival Burchill	Lib.		
33rd	1912 – 1917	John Morrissy	Lib.	William L. Allain	Ind.	Francis D. Swim	Ind.	James L. Stewart	Ind.		
34th	1917 – 1920	John Percival Burchill	Lib.	Robert Murray	Lib.	David V. Allain	Lib.	Francis C. McGrath	Lib.		
35th	1921	John Vanderbeck	UF	Fred A. Fowlie	Ind.	John S. Martin	Ind.Lab	Charles Joseph Morrissy	Lib.		
35th	1921 – 1925	Abram V. Vanderbeck	UF	Fred A. Fowlie	Ind.	John S. Martin	Ind.Lab	Charles Joseph Morrissy	Lib.		
36th	1925 – 1930	Sydney D. Heckbert	Cons.	Francis T. Lavoie	Cons.	Akerley Holmes	Cons.	Joseph Leonard O'Brien	Cons.		
37th	1931 – 1935	Frederick Tweedie	Lib.	William Stafford Anderson	Lib.	Hidulphe Savoie	Lib.	Richard J. Gill	Lib.		
38th	1935 – 1939	Frederick Tweedie	Lib.	William Stafford Anderson	Lib.	Hidulphe Savoie	Lib.	Richard J. Gill	Lib.		
39th	1939 – 1944	Frederick Tweedie	Lib.	William Stafford Anderson	Lib.	Hidulphe Savoie	Lib.	Richard J. Gill	Lib.		
40th	1944 – 1948	H. S. Murray	Lib.	William Stafford Anderson	Lib.	Hidulphe Savoie	Lib.	Richard J. Gill	Lib.		
41st	1948 – 1952	H. S. Murray	Lib.	William Stafford Anderson	Lib.	Michel A. Savoie	Lib.	Richard J. Gill	Lib.		
42nd	1952 – 1956	H. S. Murray	Lib.	William Stafford Anderson	Lib.	William J. Gallant	Lib.	Richard J. Gill	Lib.		
43rd	1957 – 1960	P. C. Price	Lib.	Joseph R. Martin	PC	William J. Gallant	Lib.	Richard J. Gill	Lib.		
44th	1960 – 1961	Clarence S. Menzies	Lib.	Graham Crocker	Lib.	Norbert Thériault	Lib.	Paul B. Lordon	Lib.		
44th	1961 – 1963	Clarence S. Menzies	Lib.	Graham Crocker	Lib.	Norbert Thériault	Lib.	J. Fraser Kerr	Lib.		
45th	1963 – 1967	Clarence S. Menzies	Lib.	Graham Crocker	Lib.	Norbert Thériault	Lib.	J. Fraser Kerr	Lib.		
46th	1967 – 1969	Clarence S. Menzies	Lib.	Graham Crocker	Lib.	Norbert Thériault	Lib.	J. Fraser Kerr	Lib.	J. L. A. Savoie	Lib.
46th	1969 – 1970	Clarence S. Menzies	Lib.	Graham Crocker	Lib.	Norbert Thériault	Lib.	J. Fraser Kerr	Lib.	Frank E. Kane	Lib.
47th	1970 – 1974	Clarence S. Menzies	Lib.	Graham Crocker	Lib.	Norbert Thériault	Lib.	Edgar LeGresley	Lib.	Frank E. Kane	Lib.
Riding dissolved into Bay du Vin, Chatham, Miramichi Bay, Miramichi-Newcastle and Southwest Miramichi

== Election results ==
1970 New Brunswick general election
Party	Candidate	Votes	%	Elected
Liberal	Frank E. Kane	10,353	11.43	✓
Liberal	H. Graham Crocker	10,216	11.28	✓
Liberal	L. Norbert Thériault	9,954	10.99	✓
Liberal	Edgar LeGresley	9,694	10.70	✓
Liberal	Clarence S. Menzies	9,577	10.57	✓
Progressive Conservative	Laurie Black	7,168	7.91	
Progressive Conservative	John Creaghan	7,067	7.80	
Progressive Conservative	George O'Donnell	6,915	7.63	
Progressive Conservative	Charles Boulay	6,667	7.36	
Progressive Conservative	Louis Gionet	6,484	7.16	
New Democratic	Joseph Albert Richardson	1,472	1.63	
New Democratic	Ronald William Kelly	1,387	1.53	
New Democratic	Theresa Kelly	1,130	1.25	
New Democratic	Ray LeBreton	997	1.10	
New Democratic	Chester John Voutour	929	1.03	
Independent	James D. Shanahan	562	0.62	
Total number of valid votes		90,572		
Total rejected ballots		344	1.69	
Turnout		20,338	79.94	
Eligible voters		25,442		

New Brunswick provincial by-election, 16 June 1969 Death of J. L. A. Savoie
Party	Candidate	Votes	%
Liberal	Frank Edward Kane	8,338	54.54
Progressive Conservative	Charles E. C. Boulay	6,951	45.46

1967 New Brunswick general election
Party	Candidate	Votes	%	Elected
Liberal	H. Graham Crocker	11,568	12.50	✓
Liberal	J. Fraser Kerr	11,276	12.18	✓
Liberal	Clarence Menzies	11,173	12.07	✓
Liberal	Norbert Thériault	11,032	11.92	✓
Liberal	Dr. J. L. A. Savoie	10,812	11.68	✓
Progressive Conservative	William Malone	7,220	7.80	
Progressive Conservative	Orville McCosh	7,199	7.78	
Progressive Conservative	Arnel J. Roach	7,062	7.63	
Progressive Conservative	Karl Wilson	7,060	7.63	
Progressive Conservative	Gerard Doiron	6,928	7.48	
New Democratic	Ronald Kelly	577	0.62	
New Democratic	Jack Currie	345	0.37	
New Democratic	Albert Richardson	325	0.35	
Total number of valid votes		92,577		

1963 New Brunswick general election
Party	Candidate	Votes	%	Elected
Liberal	Howard Crocker	9,522	14.19	✓
Liberal	John Kerr	9,481	14.13	✓
Liberal	L. Thériault	9,362	13.95	✓
Liberal	Clarence Menzies	9,261	13.80	✓
Progressive Conservative	Joseph Martin	7,619	11.36	
Progressive Conservative	Duncan Morrison	7,350	10.96	
Progressive Conservative	Arnold Somers	7,293	10.87	
Progressive Conservative	Jacques St. Coeur	7,201	10.73	
Total number of valid votes		67,089		
Source: Canadian Elections Database

New Brunswick provincial by-election, June 19, 1961 Resignation of Paul Lordon
Party	Candidate	Votes	%
Liberal	J. Fraser Kerr	9,794	59.88
Progressive Conservative	J. Robert Martin	6,561	40.12
Total number of valid votes/Turnout		16,355	70.71
Eligible voters		23,131	

1960 New Brunswick general election
Party	Candidate	Votes	%	Elected
Liberal	Paul Lordon	11,157	15.73	✓
Liberal	Howard Crocker	10,890	15.35	✓
Liberal	L. Thériault	10,744	15.15	✓
Liberal	Clarence Menzies	10,716	15.11	✓
Progressive Conservative	John Betts	7,101	10.01	
Progressive Conservative	J. Hamilton	6,871	9.69	
Progressive Conservative	Joseph Martin	6,789	9.57	
Progressive Conservative	William Gallant	6,669	9.40	
Total number of valid votes		70,937		
Source: Canadian Elections Database

1956 New Brunswick general election
Party	Candidate	Votes	%	Elected
Liberal	William Gallant	8,697	12.77	✓
Liberal	Richard Gill	8,625	12.66	✓
Progressive Conservative	Joseph Martin	8,565	12.57	✓
Liberal	P. Price	8,540	12.53	✓
Liberal	Herman Murray	8,513	12.50	
Progressive Conservative	John Betts	8,507	12.49	
Progressive Conservative	Benjamin Cleland	8,357	12.27	
Progressive Conservative	P. Lanteigne	8,326	12.22	
Total number of valid votes		68,130		
Source: Canadian Elections Database

1952 New Brunswick general election
Party	Candidate	Votes	%	Elected
Liberal	William Gallant	9,609	14.94	✓
Liberal	William Anderson	9,568	14.88	✓
Liberal	Richard Gill	9,543	14.84	✓
Liberal	Herman Murray	9,460	14.71	✓
Progressive Conservative	John Betts	6,631	10.31	
Progressive Conservative	Arthur Dunphy	6,574	10.22	
Progressive Conservative	Charles Morris	6,550	10.19	
Progressive Conservative	Benjamin Lavoie	6,374	9.91	
Total number of valid votes		64,309		
Source: Canadian Elections Database

1948 New Brunswick general election
Party	Candidate	Votes	%	Elected
Liberal	Richard Gill	9,506	18.12	✓
Liberal	William Anderson	9,463	18.04	✓
Liberal	Hidulphe Savoie	9,409	17.94	✓
Liberal	Herman Murray	9,386	17.90	✓
Independent	John Betts	3,596	6.86	
Independent	Colin Fraser	3,511	6.69	
Independent	Wilson Jonah	3,439	6.56	
Independent	George Pitre	3,368	6.42	
Co-operative Commonwealth	Paul Hansen	771	1.47	
Total number of valid votes		52,449		
Source: Canadian Elections Database

== See also ==
- List of New Brunswick provincial electoral districts
- Canadian provincial electoral districts
