= Bay du Vin (electoral district) =

Defunct provincial electoral district in New Brunswick, Canada

New Brunswick electoral district

Defunct provincial electoral district
- Legislature: Legislative Assembly of New Brunswick
- District created: 1973
- District abolished: 1994
- First contested: 1974
- Last contested: 1991

Bay du Vin was a provincial electoral district in New Brunswick. It was created from the multi-member riding of Northumberland in the 1973 electoral redistribution, and was abolished in the 1994 electoral redistribution.

== Members of the Legislative Assembly ==
Assembly	Years	Member	Party
Riding created from Northumberland
48th	1974–1978	Norbert Thériault	Liberal
49th	1978–1982	Norbert Thériault	Liberal
50th	1982–1987	Roger Wedge	Progressive Conservative
51st	1987–1991	Reg MacDonald	Liberal
52nd	1991–1995	Reg MacDonald	Liberal
Riding dissolved into Miramichi-Bay du Vin, Rogersville-Kouchibouguac and Southwest Miramichi

== Election results ==
1991 New Brunswick general election
Party	Candidate	Votes	%	±%
Liberal	Reg MacDonald	2,834	53.82	-0.06
Progressive Conservative	Muriel Lamkey	1,608	30.54	-13.26
Confederation of Regions	John J. Keating	604	11.47	–
New Democratic	Jeanne Thériault	220	4.18	+1.87
Total valid votes		5,266	100.0	
Liberal hold		Swing		+6.60

1987 New Brunswick general election
Party	Candidate	Votes	%	±%
Liberal	Reg MacDonald	3,026	53.88	+6.81
Progressive Conservative	Roger "Butch" Wedge	2,460	43.80	-5.50
New Democratic	Yvon Roy	130	2.31	-0.65
Total valid votes		5,616	100.0	
Liberal gain from Progressive Conservative		Swing		+6.16

1982 New Brunswick general election
Party	Candidate	Votes	%	±%
Progressive Conservative	Roger "Butch" Wedge	2,579	49.30	+8.33
Liberal	Reg MacDonald	2,462	47.07	-9.68
New Democratic	Harold J. Manual	155	2.96	–
Parti acadien	Robert Wilfred Melanson	35	0.67	–
Total valid votes		5,231	100.0	
Progressive Conservative gain from Liberal		Swing		+9.00

1978 New Brunswick general election
Party	Candidate	Votes	%	±%
Liberal	L. Norbert Thériault	2,515	56.75	+2.21
Progressive Conservative	Robert S. Lamkey	1,816	40.97	-1.04
Independent	Joseph Alban Mazerolle	101	2.28	–
Total valid votes		4,432	100.0	
Liberal hold		Swing		+1.62

1974 New Brunswick general election
Party	Candidate	Votes	%
Liberal	L. Norbert Thériault	2,197	54.54
Progressive Conservative	Robert S. Lamkey	1,692	42.01
New Democratic	Laurie Richard	139	3.45
Total valid votes		4,028	100.0
The previous multi-member riding of Northumberland went totally Liberal in the last election, with Norbert Thériault being one of five incumbents.

== See also ==
- List of New Brunswick provincial electoral districts
- Canadian provincial electoral districts
