= Department of Municipal Affairs (New Brunswick) =

The Department of Municipal Affairs was a part of the Government of New Brunswick. It was charged with the planning and supervision of local government in New Brunswick. From 1938 to 1954, this ministry was combined with Education. In 1986, the department became the Department of Municipal Affairs and Environment; the department was renamed back to the original name in 1989. In 1991, the department's functions were assumed by the new Department of Municipalities, Culture and Housing.

== Ministers ==
#	Minister	Term	Government
1.	A. P. Paterson	July 16, 1938 – January 10, 1940	under Allison Dysart
2.	Charles H. Blakeney	January 10, 1940 – March 13, 1940	under Allison Dysart
	Charles H. Blakeney (cont'd)	March 13, 1940 - November 2, 1948	under John McNair
3.	James W. Brittain	November 2, 1948 – October 8, 1952	under John McNair
4.	Claude Taylor	October 8, 1952 – June 1954	under Hugh John Flemming
5.	T. Babbitt Parlee	June 1954 - January 27, 1957	under Hugh John Flemming
6.	J. Stewart Brooks	April 5, 1957 - August 1, 1958	under Hugh John Flemming
7.	Hugh John Flemming	August 1, 1958 - July 12, 1960	under Hugh John Flemming
8.	Joseph E. LeBlanc	July 12, 1960 - May 18, 1965	under Louis Robichaud
9.	Norbert Thériault	May 18, 1965 - November 20, 1967	under Louis Robichaud
10.	Fernand Nadeau	November 20, 1967 - February 11, 1970	under Louis Robichaud
12.	Robert J. Higgins	February 11, 1970 - November 12, 1970	under Louis Robichaud
13.	Jean-Paul LeBlanc	November 12, 1970 - July 18, 1972	under Richard Hatfield
14.	Horace Smith	July 18, 1972 - October 30, 1982	under Richard Hatfield
15.	Yvon Poitras	October 30, 1982 - October 3, 1985	under Richard Hatfield
16.	Robert Jackson	October 3, 1985 - October 27, 1987	under Richard Hatfield
17.	Vaughn Blaney	October 27, 1987 - June 15, 1989	under Frank McKenna
18.	Hubert Seamans	June 15, 1989 - October 9, 1991	under Frank McKenna
