= Akerley =

Akerley is a given name and surname. Notable people with the name include:

- Akeley Holmes (1894–1946), Canadian politician from New Brunswick
- Irvin William Akerley (1904–1995), Canadian businessman and politician from Nova Scotia
