= Moncton (provincial electoral district) =

Defunct provincial electoral district in New Brunswick, Canada

New Brunswick electoral district

Defunct provincial electoral district
- Legislature: Legislative Assembly of New Brunswick
- District created: 1912
- District abolished: 1973
- First contested: 1912
- Last contested: 1970

Moncton was a provincial electoral district for the Legislative Assembly of New Brunswick, Canada. It was created from Westmorland in 1912, and used a bloc voting system to elect candidates. It was abolished with the 1973 electoral redistribution, when the province moved to single-member ridings.

== Members of the Legislative Assembly ==
Legislature	Years	Member	Party	Member	Party	Member	Party
Riding created from Westmorland
33rd	1912 – 1917	Otto Baird Price	Cons.				
34th	1917 – 1920	Clifford William Robinson	Lib.				
35th	1921 – 1924	Clifford William Robinson	Lib.				
35th	1924 – 1925	E. Albert Reilly	Cons.				
36th	1925 – 1930	E. Albert Reilly	Cons.				
37th	1931 – 1935	E. Albert Reilly	Cons.				
38th	1935 – 1939	Charles H. Blakeney	Lib.				
39th	1939 – 1944	Charles H. Blakeney	Lib.				
40th	1944 – 1948	Charles H. Blakeney	Lib.				
41st	1948 – 1952	E. A. Fryers	Lib.	Claudius L. L. Léger	Lib.		
42nd	1952 – 1956	Joseph W. Bourgeois	PC	T. Babbitt Parlee	PC		
43rd	1957 – 1960	Joseph W. Bourgeois	PC	T. Babbitt Parlee	PC		
44th	1960 – 1963	L.G. DesBrisay	Lib.	Gilbert Robichaud	Lib.		
45th	1963 – 1967	L.G. DesBrisay	Lib.	Gilbert Robichaud	Lib.		
46th	1967 – 1970	L.G. DesBrisay	Lib.	R. V. Lenihan	Lib.	Léonide H. Cyr	Lib.
47th	1970 – 1974	Paul Creaghan	PC	Arthur Buck	PC	Jean-Paul LeBlanc	PC
Riding dissolved into Moncton East, Moncton North and Moncton West

== Election results ==
1970 New Brunswick general election
Party	Candidate	Votes	Elected
Progressive Conservative	Paul Creaghan	12,203	✓
Progressive Conservative	Arthur Buck	11,573	✓
Progressive Conservative	Jean-Paul LeBlanc	11,235	✓
Liberal	Léonide H. Cyr	9,912	
Liberal	L.G. DesBrisay	9,905	
Liberal	R. V. Lenihan	9,897	
New Democratic	David Britton	844	
New Democratic	David V. Webster	696	
New Democratic	Kenneth R. White	674	
Independent	Steadman D. Steeves	383	

1967 New Brunswick general election
Party	Candidate	Votes	Elected
Liberal	L.G. DesBrisay	11,130	✓
Liberal	R. V. Lenihan	11,065	✓
Liberal	Léonide Cyr	10,951	✓
Progressive Conservative	Paul Creaghan	10,916	
Progressive Conservative	Charlie Thomas	10,144	
Progressive Conservative	Roger Savoie	9,945	
