= Robert J. Higgins =

Canadian politician

- Born: January 13, 1934 (age 92); Saint John, New Brunswick
- Education: St. Francis Xavier University, University of New Brunswick
- Occupations: Lawyer, Judge, Politician
- Political party: Liberal
- Spouse: Rosemary Keenan

Robert J. Higgins (born January 13, 1934) is a supernumerary justice on the Court of King's Bench of New Brunswick and a former member of the Legislative Assembly of New Brunswick who served as the leader of the New Brunswick Liberal Party from 1971 to 1978.

Robert Higgins was born in Saint John in 1934. He graduated from St. Francis Xavier University in 1956 then earned a law degree in 1960 from the University of New Brunswick. While practising law in the city of Saint John, New Brunswick, Higgins turned to politics and in the 1967 provincial election was the only successful Liberal Party candidate in the seven Saint John city ridings. He served in the 46th New Brunswick Legislative Assembly and on April 1, 1968, was appointed to the Cabinet by Premier Louis Robichaud as Minister of Economic Development. On February 11, 1970, he was appointed Minister of Municipal Affairs, serving until November 12 of that year when he was personally reelected in 1970 but when his party lost power.

== Party leader ==
Following the defeat of his governing Liberals under the leader and Premier Louis Robichaud, Higgins was voted the party's leader and became Leader of the official opposition in the Legislative Assembly. He led the party to a plurality of the popular votes cast in the 1974 provincial election, but lost in total seats to the governing Progressive Conservative Party of Premier Richard Hatfield who earned strong support from the Acadian community. Prior to the 1978 election, Higgins staked his reputation and his position as party leader on an assertion that Premier Hatfield was personally involved in a scandal. The accusation could not be proven and Higgins stepped down as party leader in favor of Joseph Daigle.

After leaving politics, Higgins returned to the practise of law and would be appointed a justice of the Court of Queen's Bench of New Brunswick in Saint John. Since April 1999 he has been a justice with supernumerary status.

In 2006, Robert Higgins was inducted in St. Francis Xavier University Hall of Honor. Higgins was also awarded an honorary doctorate by the University of New Brunswick.

== Personal life ==
Robert Higgins is married to Rosemary Higgins [Keenan], former Miss Canada 1960. They have four children.

Preceded by Louis J. Robichaud	Opposition Leader in the New Brunswick Legislature; 1971–1978	Succeeded by Joseph Daigle
Preceded by Louis J. Robichaud	Leader of the New Brunswick Liberals; 1971–1978	Joseph Z. Daigle
New Brunswick provincial government of Louis Robichaud
Cabinet posts (2)
Predecessor	Office	Successor
Fernand Nadeau	'Minister of Municipal Affairs'; 1970	Jean-Paul LeBlanc
L. G. DesBrisay	'Minister of Economic Development'; 1968–1970	H. H. Williamson
Other offices
Preceded by New riding	MLA for Saint John Centre; 1967–1978	Shirley Dysart
