= Roger Wedge =

Canadian politician (1948–2010)

Member of the Legislative Assembly of New Brunswick
- In office 1982–1987
- Preceded by: Norbert Thériault
- Succeeded by: Reg MacDonald
- Constituency: Saint John West

Personal details
- Born: January 3, 1948 Saint John, New Brunswick
- Died: February 23, 2010
- Party: Progressive Conservative Party of New Brunswick
- Spouse: Yolande Marie Bourque
- Children: 2
- Occupation: salesman

Roger Arthur "Butch" Wedge (January 3, 1948 – February 23, 2010) was a Canadian politician. He served in the Legislative Assembly of New Brunswick from 1982 to 1987 as member of the Progressive Conservative Party from the constituency of Saint John West.
