= Department of Youth (New Brunswick) =

The Department of Youth was a part of the Government of New Brunswick. Originally named the Department of Youth and Welfare, it was charged with the planning and supervision of services for youth and administration of social welfare programs in New Brunswick. In 1968, functions related to social welfare were moved to the Department of Health and Welfare.

== Ministers ==
#	Minister	Term	Government
1.	William R. Duffie	November 28, 1960 – March 21, 1966	under Louis Robichaud
2.	John D. MacCallum	March 21, 1966 – November 20, 1967	under Louis Robichaud
3.	Joffre Daigle	November 20, 1967 – September 9, 1968	under Louis Robichaud
4.	Louis D. Robichaud	September 9, 1968 – November 12, 1970	under Louis Robichaud
5.	Brenda Robertson	November 12, 1970 – December 3, 1974	under Richard Hatfield
6.	Jean-Pierre Ouellet	December 3, 1974 – October 20, 1982	under Richard Hatfield
7.	Leslie Hull	October 20, 1982 – October 3, 1985	under Richard Hatfield
