= Georges Corriveau =

Canadian politician

Member of the Legislative Assembly of New Brunswick
- In office 1987–1995
- Preceded by: Jean-Pierre Ouellet
- Succeeded by: Jeannot Volpé
- Constituency: Madawaska les Lacs

Personal details
- Born: June 17, 1951 (age 75) Edmundston, New Brunswick
- Party: New Brunswick Liberal Association
- Spouse: Èlaine Violette
- Children: 2
- Education: Université de Moncton
- Occupation: civil engineer

Georges Corriveau (born July 17, 1951) is a former Canadian politician. He served in the Legislative Assembly of New Brunswick from 1987 to 1995 as a Liberal member from the constituency of Madawaska les Lacs.
