= Jean-Paul LeBlanc =

Jean-Paul LeBlanc may refer to:

- Jean-Paul LeBlanc (ice hockey)
- Jean-Paul LeBlanc (politician)
