= Guerette =

Surname list

Guerette is a surname. Notable people with the surname include:

- Lee Guerette (1949–2025), American politician
- Michelle Guerette (born 1980), American rower
- Patrick Guérette (1918–1997), Canadian politician
