= Douglas Everett =

Douglas or Doug Everett may refer to:

- Douglas Everett (politician) (1927–2018), Canadian automobile dealer, lawyer and politician
- Douglas Everett (ice hockey) (1905–1996), American ice hockey player
- Doug Everett, character in Adventure in Iraq
- C. Douglas Everett (1902–1982), insurance agent and political figure in New Brunswick, Canada
- Douglas Hugh Everett (1916–2002), British chemist
