= Department of Energy and Resource Development (New Brunswick) =

Government department in New Brunswick, Canada

Department of Natural Resources and Energy Development

Agency overview
- Jurisdiction: New Brunswick
- Parent department: Government of New Brunswick

The Department of Natural Resources and Energy Development is the department in the Government of New Brunswick, Canada, that oversees matters related to natural resources and energy development.

It is responsible for management of the Province's forests including timber utilization; trail management; insect and disease protection including spruce budworm and gypsy moth; fire protection; management of the fish and wildlife resources and the issuing of hunting and angling licenses; management of mineral and hydrocarbon resources and associated support services including oil and natural gas development and production; geological surveys; management of Crown lands, including natural areas; oversight and development of the energy sector; and overseeing the delivery of the First Nations wood harvesting program.

== History ==
The department, or a minister responsible for this area, has existed in one form or another since 1793. The Cabinet Minister responsible for the department was originally known as the Surveyor-General and later as Minister of Lands and Mines, Minister of Natural Resources, and also Minister of Natural Resources and Energy.

In 2016 cabinet shuffle by then premier Brian Gallant, the department changed its name from the Department of Natural Resources to the Department of Energy and Resource Development.

After the election of premier Blaine Higgs in the 2018 New Brunswick general election, the department was further renamed to the Department of Natural Resources and Energy Development.

== Ministers ==
| # | Minister | Term | |
|---|---|---|---|
| 1. | John Saunders | May 3, 1793 – October 19, 1824 | |
| 2. | Thomas Baillie | October 19, 1824 – September 1851 | |
| 3. | Robert Duncan Wilmot | September 1851 – November 1, 1854 | |
| 4. | John Montgomery | July 29, 1856 – June 9, 1857 | |
| 5. | James Brown | June 1, 1857 – July 26, 1861 | |
| 6. | John McMillan | July 26, 1861 – April 5, 1865 | |
| 7. | Bliss Botsford | April 5, 1865 – April 14, 1866 | |
| 8. | Charles Connell | July 10, 1866 – July 17, 1867 | |
| 9. | Richard Sutton | July 17, 1867 – February 13, 1869 | |
| 10. | William P. Flewelling | February 13, 1869 – October 1870 | |
| 11. | William Lindsay | October 1870 – February 22, 1871 | |
| 12. | Benjamin R. Stephenson | February 22, 1871 -July 6, 1878 | |
| 13. | Michael Adams | July 13, 1878 – February 26, 1883 | |
| 14. | James Mitchell | March 3, 1883 – February 3, 1890 | |
| 15. | L. J. Tweedie | February 3, 1890 – July 17, 1896 | |
| 16. | Albert T. Dunn | July 17, 1896 – March 28, 1904 | |
| 17. | L. J. Tweedie (acting) | March 1904 – ? | |
| 18. | Francis J. Sweeney | 1904 – 1908? | |
| 19. | W.C.H. Grimmer | March 24, 1908 – October 16, 1911 | |
| 20. | James K. Flemming | October 16, 1911 – December 6, 1914 | |
| 21. | James A. Murray | ? | |
| 22. | George J. Clarke | December 17, 1914 – February 1, 1917 | |
| 23. | Arthur R. Slipp | February 2, 1917 – April 1, 1917 | |
| 24. | Ernest A. Smith | April 4, 1917 – September 14, 1920 | |
| 25. | Clifford W. Robinson | October 1, 1920 – 1923 | |
| 26. | Judson E. Hetherington | ? | |
| 27. | Peter J. Veniot | May 6, 1924 – ? | |
| 28. | A. Allison Dysart | July 10, 1925 – September 14, 1925 | |
| 29. | Charles D. Richards | September 14, 1925 – May 18, 1931 | |
| 30. | L. P. D. Tilley | June 1, 1933 – July 16, 1935 | |
| 31. | Frederick W. Pirie | July 16, 1935 – April 18, 1945 | |
| 32. | John B. McNair | ? | |
| 33. | Richard J. Gill | May 1946 – October 8, 1952 | |
| 34. | Norman B. Buchanan | October 8, 1952 – July 12, 1960 | |
| 35. | Graham Crocker | July 12, 1960 – May 13, 1965 | |
| 36. | Daniel A. Riley | May 13, 1965 – January 26, 1966 | |
| 37. | William R. Duffie | March 21, 1966 – November 12, 1970 | |
| 38. | Wilfred Bishop | November 12, 1970 – July 18, 1972 | |
| 39. | A. Edison Stairs | July 18, 1972 – December 3, 1974 | |
| 40. | Roland Boudreau | December 3, 1974 – November 21, 1978 | |
| 41. | J. W. "Bud" Bird | November 21, 1978 – June 10, 1982 | |
| 42. | Edwin G. Allen | June 10, 1982 – October 30, 1982 | |
| 43. | Gerald Merrithew | October 30, 1982 – August 3, 1984 | |
| 44. | Malcolm MacLeod | February 13, 1985 – October 27, 1987 | |
Department of Lands and Mines
| 45. | Morris V. Green | October 27, 1987 – August 31, 1991 | under Frank McKenna |
Department of Natural Resources
| 46. | Alan R. Graham | August 31, 1991 – May 14, 1998 | under Frank McKenna & Ray Frenette |
Department of Natural Resources and Energy
| 47. | Doug Tyler | May 14, 1998 – June 21, 1999 | under Camille Theriault |
| 48. | Jeannot Volpé | June 21, 1999 – June 27, 2003 | under Bernard Lord |
| 49. | Keith Ashfield | June 27, 2003 – September 18, 2006 | under Bernard Lord |
Department of Natural Resources
| 50. | Donald Arseneault | September 18, 2006 – November 12, 2008 | under Shawn Graham |
| 51. | R. Wallis (Wally) Stiles | November 12, 2008 – October 12, 2010 | under Shawn Graham |
| 52. | Bruce Northrup | October 12, 2010 – September 23, 2013 | under David Alward |
| 53. | Paul Robichaud | September 23, 2013 - October 7, 2014 | under David Alward |
| 53. | Denis Landry | October 7, 2014 – June 6, 2016 | under Brian Gallant |
Department of Energy and Resource Development
| 54. | Rick Doucet | June 6, 2016 - November 9, 2018 | under Brian Gallant |
Department of Natural Resources and Energy Development
| 55. | Mike Holland | November 9, 2018 - present | under Blaine Higgs |
