= John Mercer Johnson =

Canadian Father of Confederation (1818–1868)

The Honourable John Mercer Johnson
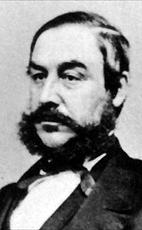

Member of the Canadian Parliament for Northumberland
- In office 1867–1868
- Preceded by: None
- Succeeded by: Richard Hutchison

Personal details
- Born: October 1, 1818 Liverpool, England
- Died: November 8, 1868 (aged 50) Chatham, New Brunswick
- Party: Liberal
- Occupation: Lawyer

John Mercer Johnson (October 1818 – November 8, 1868) was a Canadian lawyer and politician from the Province of New Brunswick, and a Father of Confederation. He represented Northumberland in the Legislative Assembly of New Brunswick from 1850 to 1865, and again from 1866 to 1867, each time elected as a candidate aligned with the liberal movement. Johnson was appointed to the Executive Council of New Brunswick and became the province's solicitor general, postmaster, minister without portfolio and attorney general. He attended all three conferences for Canadian Confederation and supported Canada's creation. In the first parliament for the country of Canada, Johnson was elected to represent Northumberland, serving in the role from 1867 to 1868 as a Liberal member. Plaques have been erected in his honour in Chatham, his hometown, and a mountain in Northumberland county was named for him.

== Early life and education ==
Johnson was born in Liverpool, England, in October 1818. His father was also named John Mercer Johnson, and he was a merchant and public official in Chatham, New Brunswick; his mother was named Ellen. The younger Johnson emigrated to Chatham, New Brunswick, in 1821. He studied at Northumberland County Grammar School, then in the law office of John Ambrose Street. In 1837, he became the secretary of the Young Men's Debating Society in Chatham. He became an attorney on October 13, 1838, and a barrister in October 1840.

== Legal career ==
In 1840, Johnson opened a law office in Chatham and joined a professional partnership with C. A. Harding, but the partnership ended two years later. In 1842 he became the second lieutenant of the 1st Battalion of New Brunswick Rifle Company. In 1846, he became the secretary of the Chatham Mechanics' institute and lectured on phrenology, a belief that bumps on the skull can predict mental traits. In October 1847, he joined a legal partnership with Peter Mitchell, which ended in 1852 when Mitchell wanted to pursue a business in lumbering and shipbuilding. In 1851, he donated land for the construction of a temperance hall.

== New Brunswick politics ==
On July 22, 1850, Johnson was elected to the New Brunswick assembly as one of the representatives from Northumberland. The assembly was non-partisan but Johnson was considered a liberal candidate and campaigned on implementing responsible government. He won his reelection on June 20, 1854. Under the premiership of Charles Fisher, Johnson was appointed to the Executive Council of New Brunswick on October 31, 1854, and became the province's solicitor general. This council, which included Johnson, Samuel Leonard Tilley, John William Ritchie and William Steeves, became known as the Smashers administration. He was reelected in the election on June 27, 1856, but was not reappointed to the council when a conservative government won the majority of seats in the New Brunswick assembly. He was reelected on May 5, 1857, and returned to the executive council on June 1, 1857, as postmaster general. Johnson was uninterested in running the department, leaving administrative tasks to the clerks. This led to a chaotic ministry and his opponents accused him of collecting a salary without doing the work his office required. He resigned from this position in November 1858 and remained on the colony's executive council as a minister without portfolio.

On February 11, 1859, Johnson was elected as the speaker of the New Brunswick assembly and resigned from the council. In 1860 he was appointed as a judge for the Inferior Court of Common Pleas and became captain of the revived 1st Battalion, which became known as the Chatham Rifles. In 1862 he became a trustee of the County Grammar School. He was re-elected as the assembly's speaker on February 12, 1862, but resigned later that year when he was appointed to be the attorney general under the premiership of Tilley. He won a subsequent election for his seat, caused by accepting a position as a minister. He remained the attorney general until 1865.

=== Canadian confederation ===
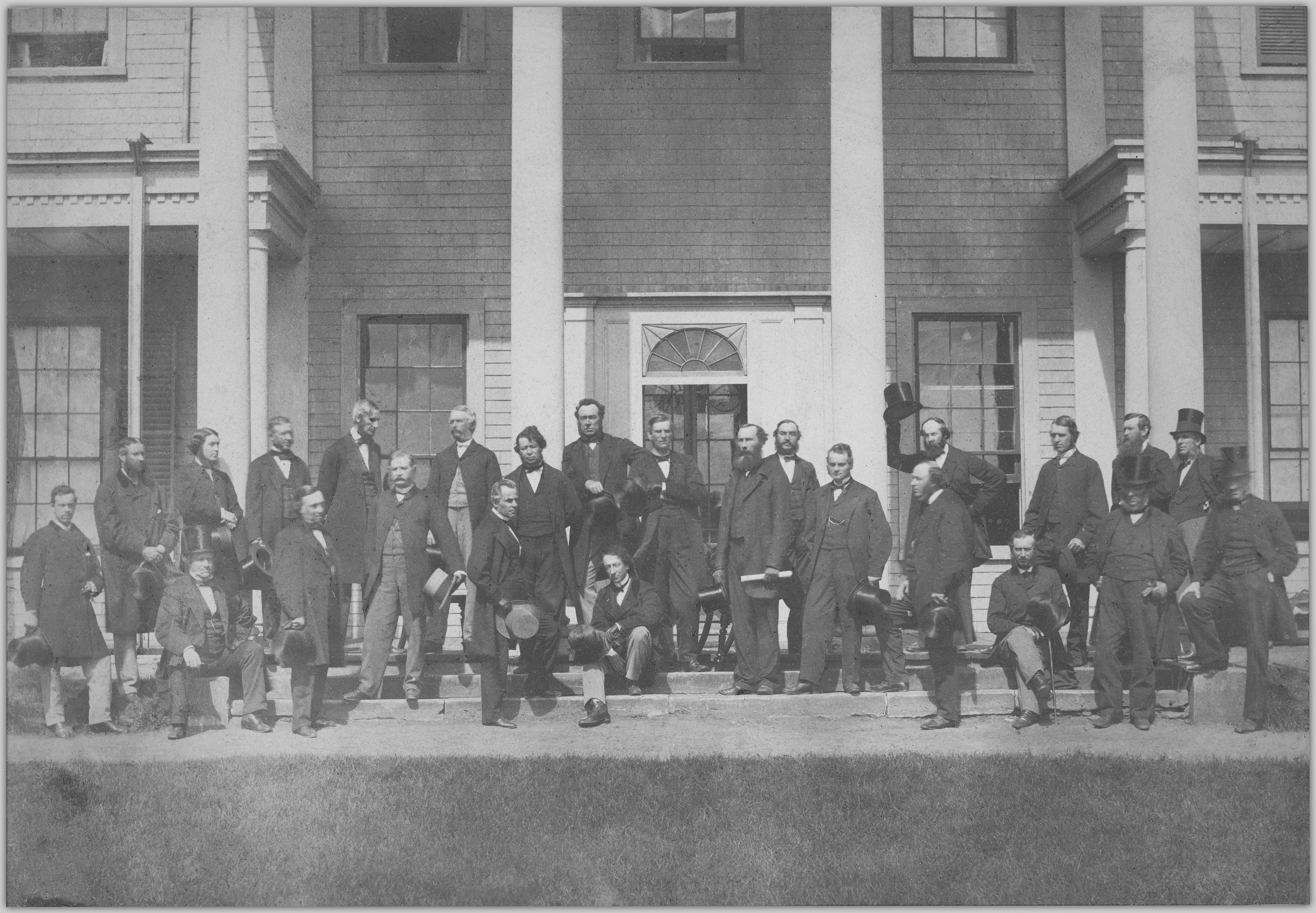
The attendees of the Charlottetown Conference. Johnson is standing fifth from the right in the back row, partially blocked by John Hamilton Gray and Samuel Leonard Tilley

Johnson represented New Brunswick at the Charlottetown Conference and the Quebec Conference in 1864 to discuss the merger of the eastern British colonies of North America into a confederation of Canada. His participation in these conferences gives him the status of a Father of Confederation in Canada. In the Charlottetown Conference, he favoured a legislative union of the colonies and suggested that provinces might be dissolved or merged. He suggested that Prince Edward Island merge with New Brunswick, which irritated the other delegates at the conference and was rejected.

He changed his mind before the Quebec Conference and thought the legislative union would be impractical. In the Quebec conference, he supported a strong, centralised federal government that would have control of the court system. His argument followed social contract ideas, where the provinces should forfeit some of their national rights as individual provinces to create a better society. Other delegates disagreed with him and wanted more provincial control of the courts. This led to a compromise where the federal government enacts criminal laws and appoints county judges, while the provinces enact civil laws and administer the courts.

He was defeated in the re-election for his seat on March 18, 1865, by an anti-confederation candidate. He won the subsequent election for his Northumberland seat on May 25, 1866. He continued advocating for the Canadian confederation, and encouraged the British colonies to remove their provincial identities and unite under a single Canadian federal government. He stated his belief that the American Civil War was caused by a weak central government. He also believed that if Canada adopted an American model of government they would either eventually merge with America or become a republic. His goal was to maintain Canada's connection to Britain, declaring that British institutions were more democratic than American ones. He also opposed the establishment of a judicial system that could override the other branches of government; if the rights of local governments were interfered with by federal law, the government could appeal to the British parliament. His belief was that parliament reflected citizens' political opinions, instead of each parliamentarian just representing their constituencies, and that referendums were not required to change the constitution of Canada or to enact new policies.

He attended the London Conference of 1866, making him one of eleven Fathers of Confederation to have attended all three conferences that led to the establishment of the Constitution Act, 1867. While in London he entertained the other members and the public with poetry presentations and ice-skating performances. He resigned from the New Brunswick assembly in June 1867 to run for the Canadian legislature.

== Canadian politics ==
On September 4, 1867, Johnson was elected as the first representative for Northumberland in the Canadian House of Commons as part of the Liberal Party of Canada. He defeated Thomas F. Gillespie in the election. Johnson and Peter Mitchell were given the moniker "the Northumberland County Smashers" for their work in representing Miramichi, one of the cities in Johnson's Northumberland constituency.

== Personal life and death ==
On October 9, 1845, he married Henrietta Shirreff; they had twelve children, of which six children survived into adulthood. Their children included Ada E. Johnson, a teacher and organist, Andrew H., a lawyer, and Edward, who ran a stationery business in Chatham.

Johnson's health deteriorated for more than a year before he became seriously ill in September 1868, and died in his home in Chatham on November 8, 1868. The cause of death was a buildup of fluid in the stomach, blamed on "social excess". This might refer to Johnson's alleged excessive drinking and gambling habits. He was buried at St. Paul's Anglican Church in Chatham.

== In memoriam ==
A plaque was placed in 1927 for Johnson's honour at St. Paul's Church in Chatham by the Imperial Order Daughters of the Empire. In the 1940s, a bronze plaque was installed on the post office in Chatham dedicated to Johnson. A street is named after him in the Chatham neighbourhood. In 1964, the provincial names authority named Mount Johnson, a mountain south of Nepisiguit River in New Brunswick, after Johnson. The Order in Council for the mountain's name took effect on September 1, 1964, in honour of the 100th anniversary of the New Brunswick delegates arrival to the Charlottetown Conference.

== Electoral record ==
1867 Canadian federal election: Northumberland (New Brunswick)
Party	Candidate	Votes	%
Liberal	John Mercer Johnson	1,226	61.83
Unknown	Thomas F. Gillespie	757	38.17
Total valid votes		1,983	100.00
Source: Canadian Elections Database
