= Madawaska Les Lacs-Edmundston =

Provincial electoral district in New Brunswick, Canada

New Brunswick electoral district
- The riding of Madawaska Les Lacs-Edmundston (as it exists from 2023) in relation to other New Brunswick electoral districts
- Coordinates: 47.393°N 68.459°W

Provincial electoral district
- Legislature: Legislative Assembly of New Brunswick
MLA
Francine Landry
Liberal
- District created: 1973
- First contested: 1974
- Last contested: 2024

Demographics
- Population (2011): 15,676
- Electors (2013): 11,132

Madawaska Les Lacs-Edmundston is a provincial electoral district for the Legislative Assembly of New Brunswick, Canada.

The district was established in 1973 as Madawaska les Lacs when New Brunswick moved from a system of bloc voting to the first past the post electoral system. It had previously been a part of the Madawaska County electoral district which returned three members.

It the 1994 electoral redistribution, it added parts of the old district of Madawaska Centre and it underwent only very minor boundary changes in 2006.

In 2013, it added more of the city of Edmundston to its boundaries and was renamed.

It was formerly one of the safest francophone seats in New Brunswick for the Progressive Conservatives. It was held by the PCs in every election since it was created except for the 1987 election (in which the Liberals won every seat) and the 1991 election (in which the PCs won only three seats and the main opposition was the conservative Confederation of Regions Party which opposed official status for the French language). Recently, it has elected Liberal MLAs. Its current MLA is Francine Landry of the Liberal Party.

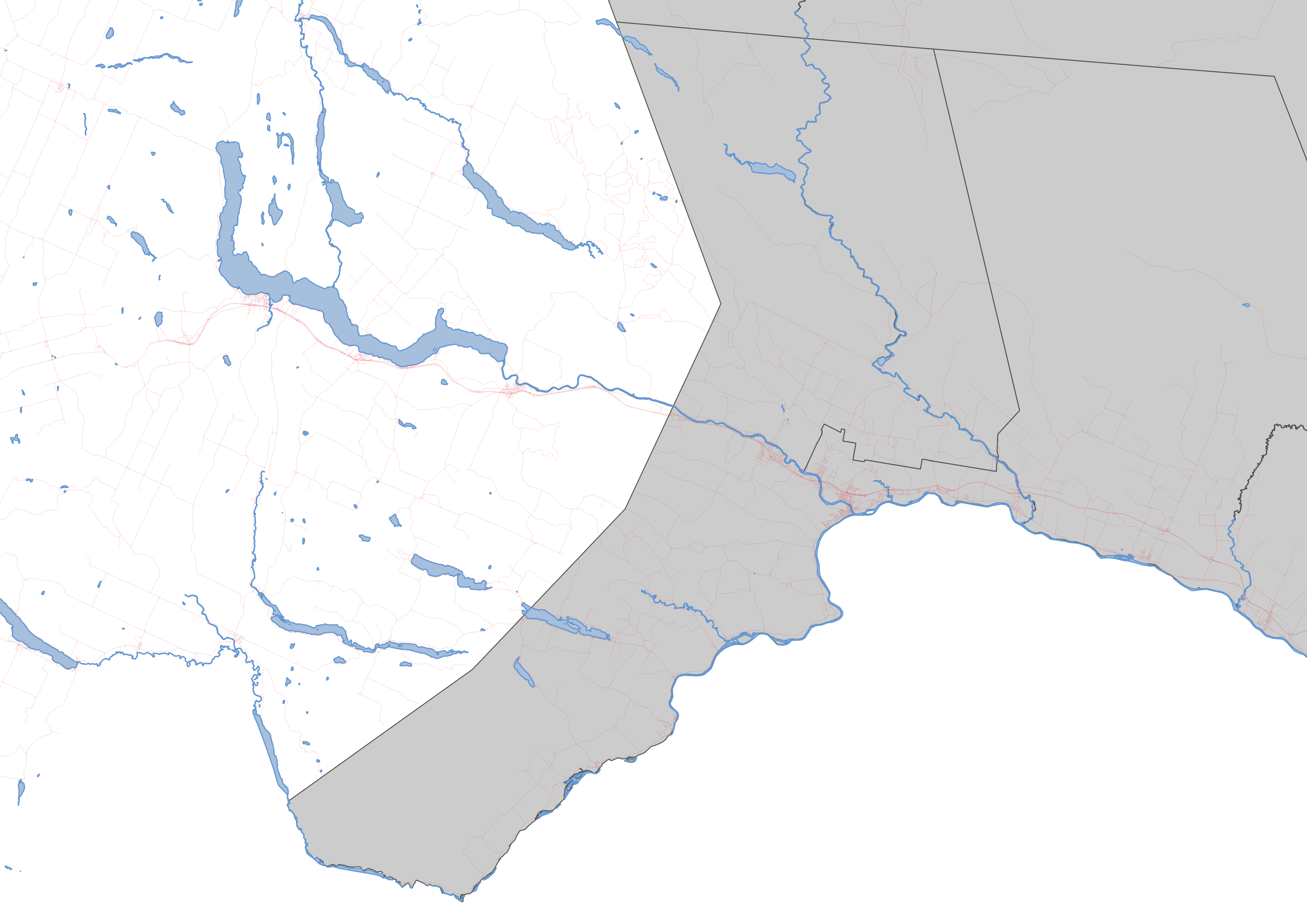
Madawaska Les Lacs-Edmundston (as it exists from 2023) and the roads in the riding

== Members of the Legislative Assembly ==
Assembly	Years	Member	Party
Madawaska les Lacs
Riding created from Madawaska
48th	1974–1978	Jean-Pierre Ouellet	Progressive Conservative
49th	1978–1982	Jean-Pierre Ouellet	Progressive Conservative
50th	1982–1987	Jean-Pierre Ouellet	Progressive Conservative
51st	1987–1991	Georges Corriveau	Liberal
52nd	1991–1995	Georges Corriveau	Liberal
53rd	1995–1999	Jeannot Volpé	Progressive Conservative
54th	1999–2003	Jeannot Volpé	Progressive Conservative
55th	2003–2006	Jeannot Volpé	Progressive Conservative
56th	2006–2010	Jeannot Volpé	Progressive Conservative
57th	2010–2014	Yvon Bonenfant	Progressive Conservative
Madawaska Les Lacs-Edmundston
58th	2014–2018	Francine Landry	Liberal
59th	2018–2020	Francine Landry	Liberal
60th	2020–2024	Francine Landry	Liberal
61st	2024–Present	Francine Landry	Liberal

== Election results ==
=== Madawaska Les Lacs-Edmundston ===
2024 New Brunswick general election
Party	Candidate	Votes	%	±%
Liberal	Francine Landry	4,798	67.1%	+0.56
Progressive Conservative	Michel Morin	1,970	27.5%	+1.90
Green	Alain Martel	218	3.0%	-4.87
New Democratic	André Martin	114	1.6%	
Consensus NB	Richard Barahoga	53	0.7%	
Total valid votes		7,153		
Total rejected ballots				
Turnout				
Eligible voters				
Liberal hold		Swing		
Source: Elections New Brunswick

2020 New Brunswick general election
Party	Candidate	Votes	%	±%
Liberal	Francine Landry	4,583	66.54	+7.67
Progressive Conservative	Marie-Eve Castonguay	1,763	25.60	-0.05
Green	Marie-Soleil Lussier	542	7.87	-5.40
Total valid votes		6,888	99.24	
Total rejected ballots		53	0.76	
Turnout		6,941	61.65	
Eligible voters		11,258		
Liberal hold		Swing		+3.86

2018 New Brunswick general election
Party	Candidate	Votes	%	±%
Liberal	Francine Landry	4,191	58.87	+2.48
Progressive Conservative	Jeannot Volpé	1,826	25.65	-10.27
Green	Denis Boulet	945	13.27	--
New Democratic	Cécile Richard-Hébert	156	2.19	-5.50
Total valid votes		7,118	100.0	
Total rejected ballots		72		
Turnout		7,190	63.20	
Eligible voters		11,377		

2014 New Brunswick general election
Party	Candidate	Votes	%	±%
Liberal	Francine Landry	4,106	56.39	+24.57
Progressive Conservative	Yvon Bonenfant	2,616	35.92	-18.25
New Democratic	Widler Jules	560	7.69	+4.02
Total valid votes		7,282	100.0	
Total rejected ballots		91	1.23	
Turnout		7,373	63.14	
Eligible voters		11,677		
Liberal notional gain from Progressive Conservative		Swing		+21.41

=== Madawaska les Lacs ===
2010 New Brunswick general election
Party	Candidate	Votes	%	±%
Progressive Conservative	Yvon Bonenfant	3,378	54.17	-9.08
Liberal	Jocelyn Levesque	1,985	31.82	-2.21
Independent	Jean-Marc Nadeau	644	10.33	–
New Democratic	Nicole Therieault	229	3.67	+0.96
Total valid votes		6,236	100.0	
Total rejected ballots		115	1.81	
Turnout		6,351	70.88	
Eligible voters		8,960		
Progressive Conservative hold		Swing		-3.43

2006 New Brunswick general election
Party	Candidate	Votes	%	±%
Progressive Conservative	Jeannot Volpé	4,271	63.25	+2.65
Liberal	Elaine Albert	2,299	34.04	-2.50
New Democratic	Jeff Thibodeau	183	2.71	-0.15
Total valid votes		6,753	100.0	
Progressive Conservative hold		Swing		+2.58

2003 New Brunswick general election
Party	Candidate	Votes	%	±%
Progressive Conservative	Jeannot Volpé	3,965	60.60	-4.57
Liberal	Louis Labrie	2,391	36.54	+4.05
New Democratic	Jason Carney	187	2.86	+0.52
Total valid votes		6,543	100.0	
Progressive Conservative hold		Swing		-4.31

1999 New Brunswick general election
Party	Candidate	Votes	%	±%
Progressive Conservative	Jeannot Volpé	4,289	65.17	+9.15
Liberal	Georges Corriveau	2,138	32.49	-10.07
New Democratic	Marie-Pierre Valay-Nadeau	154	2.34	+0.92
Total valid votes		6,581	100.0	
Progressive Conservative hold		Swing		+9.61

1995 New Brunswick general election
Party	Candidate	Votes	%	±%
Progressive Conservative	Jeannot Volpé	4,060	56.02	+17.35
Liberal	Georges Corriveau	3,085	42.56	-8.26
New Democratic	John Nowlan	103	1.42	-9.09
Total valid votes		7,248	100.0	
Progressive Conservative gain from Liberal		Swing		+12.80

1991 New Brunswick general election
Party	Candidate	Votes	%	±%
Liberal	Georges Corriveau	2,906	50.82	-11.70
Progressive Conservative	Raoul Cyr	2,211	38.67	+7.19
New Democratic	Gérard Caron	601	10.51	+4.51
Total valid votes		5,718	100.0	
Liberal hold		Swing		-9.44

1987 New Brunswick general election
Party	Candidate	Votes	%	±%
Liberal	Georges Corriveau	3,839	62.52	+18.58
Progressive Conservative	Jean-Pierre Ouellet	1,933	31.48	-21.54
New Democratic	Maurice Clavette	368	6.00	+2.96
Total valid votes		6,140	100.0	
Liberal gain from Progressive Conservative		Swing		+20.06

1982 New Brunswick general election
Party	Candidate	Votes	%	±%
Progressive Conservative	Jean-Pierre Ouellet	3,071	53.02	-4.06
Liberal	Luc Daigle	2,545	43.94	+2.82
New Democratic	Rino Pelletier	176	3.04	–
Total valid votes		5,792	100.0	
Progressive Conservative hold		Swing		-3.44

1978 New Brunswick general election
Party	Candidate	Votes	%	±%
Progressive Conservative	Jean-Pierre Ouellet	2,876	57.08	+7.13
Liberal	Nelson Bellefleur	2,071	41.12	-6.43
Parti acadien	Yves C. LeClerc	90	1.79	-0.71
Total valid votes		5,037	100.0	
Progressive Conservative hold		Swing		+6.78

1974 New Brunswick general election
Party	Candidate	Votes	%	±%
Progressive Conservative	Jean-Pierre Ouellet	1,976	49.95	
Liberal	Laurier Lévesque	1,881	47.55	
Parti acadien	Jean-Marie Nadeau	99	2.50	
Total valid votes		3,956	100.0	
The previous multi-member riding of Madawaska district had returned three Liberals in the previous election, with Laurier Lévesque being one of three incumbents.

== See also ==
- List of New Brunswick provincial electoral districts
- Canadian provincial electoral districts
