= Sydney D. Heckbert =

Canadian politician

Member of the Legislative Assembly of New Brunswick
- In office 1925–1930
- Constituency: Northumberland

Personal details
- Born: February 9, 1868 Summerside, Prince Edward Island
- Died: August 5, 1953 (aged 80) Chatham, New Brunswick
- Party: Conservative Party of New Brunswick
- Spouse: Estella May Bowser
- Children: six
- Occupation: merchant tailor

Sydney Duncan Heckbert (February 9, 1873 – August 5, 1953) was a Canadian politician. He served in the Legislative Assembly of New Brunswick as member of the Conservative party representing Northumberland County from 1925 to 1930.
