= Laurier Lévesque =

Canadian politician (1929–2005)

- Born: October 13, 1929; Saint-Jacques, New Brunswick
- Died: September 7, 2005 (aged 75); Edmundston, New Brunswick
- Education: St. Joseph's College; New Brunswick Teachers' College
- Occupations: Educator, Insurance agent, politician
- Political party: Liberal Party
- Board member of: Edmundston Chamber of Commerce
- Spouse: Carmen Dupere
- Parent(s): Bélonie Lévesque & Marie Thiveault

Laurier Lévesque (October 13, 1929 – September 7, 2005) was a Canadian educator and a politician in the Province of New Brunswick.

A graduate of St. Joseph's College in Memramcook and the New Brunswick Teachers' College in Fredericton, Laurier Lévesque taught school before entering political life. A resident of Edmundston, New Brunswick, he was first elected to the Legislative Assembly in the 1960 New Brunswick general election as a Liberal Party candidate for one of the three seats for Madawaska County. He was reelected in 1963, 1967, and 1970.

In the 1974 election, he lost by 95 votes to the Progressive Conservative candidate Jean-Pierre Ouellet in the newly created riding of Madawaska-les-Lacs. Without the Parti acadien contesting the riding, Lévesque may have won. The Parti acadien received 99 votes, ones that are generally accepted as being traditional Liberal supporters. Laurier Lévesque attempted a political comeback in the City of Edmundston riding in 1982 but lost to Jean-Maurice Simard.

As a Member of the Legislative Assembly in the government of Premier Louis Robichaud, Laurier Lévesque was an ardent defender of Francophone rights and was one of the first Members to give his speeches in the Assembly in the French language.

Out of politics, in 1990 the Government of Canada appointed him to diplomatic missions abroad which organized and supervised democratic elections in 10 African countries, in 2 countries from the former Soviet Union, as well as in Bosnia and Herzegovina.

Legislative Assembly of New Brunswick
Preceded by Edgar Fournier	MLA for Madawaska County; 1960–1974	Succeeded by Jean-Pierre Ouellet
