= Léonide H. Cyr =

Canadian politician

Member of the Legislative Assembly of New Brunswick
- In office 1967–1970
- Constituency: Moncton

Personal details
- Born: April 19, 1926 Edmundston, New Brunswick
- Died: November 4, 2009 (aged 83) Moncton, New Brunswick
- Party: New Brunswick Liberal Association
- Spouse: Laetitia Theriault
- Children: 4
- Education: St. Francis Xavier University (BA); Dalhousie University (LLB)
- Occupation: lawyer

Léonide Honore Cyr (April 19, 1926 – November 4, 2009) was a Canadian politician. He served in the Legislative Assembly of New Brunswick from 1967 to 1970 as member of the Liberal party.
