= Francis T. Lavoie =

Canadian politician

Member of the Legislative Assembly of New Brunswick
- In office 1925–1930
- Constituency: Northumberland

Personal details
- Born: May 22, 1874 Rogersville, New Brunswick
- Died: August 26, 1947 (aged 73) Rogersville, New Brunswick
- Party: Conservative Party of New Brunswick
- Spouse: Marie Wedge
- Children: seven
- Occupation: merchant, farmer

Francis T. Lavoie (May 22, 1874 – August 26, 1947) was a Canadian politician. He served in the Legislative Assembly of New Brunswick as member of the Conservative party representing Northumberland County from 1925 to 1930.
