= Department of Health (New Brunswick) =

Agency overview
- Jurisdiction: Government of New Brunswick
- Headquarters: HSBC Place; 520 King Street; Fredericton, New Brunswick, Canada
- Ministers responsible: John Dornan, Minister of Health; Eric Beaulieu, Deputy Minister
- Website: www2.gnb.ca/content/gnb/en/departments/health.html

The Department of Health is a part of the Government of New Brunswick. It is charged with administration and delivery of public healthcare in New Brunswick.

== History ==
The department was first established in 1918 as the Department of Health and Labour and gradually grew in importance, splitting in two in 1944 with one section becoming the Department of Health. It began to grow rapidly in the 1960s when Premier Louis Robichaud's equal opportunity program consolidated jurisdiction for health with the province as opposed to local governments and also with the introduction of public medicine in the same decade.

The department eventually came to be named the Department of Health and Community Services as it gained responsibility for new programs such as long-term care in nursing homes, local psychological services and so on. On March 23, 2000 when Premier Bernard Lord restructured the New Brunswick Cabinet. He split the department with the health delivery sections of the department becoming the Department of Health and Wellness, while the long-term care and community psychological services joined with other branches of government to form the Department of Family and Community Services. "Wellness" was included in the name of the new department to draw focus to that relatively new paradigm on which the government intended to focus. On February 14, 2006, it was again split with the Wellness promotion aspects being joined with the Culture and Sport Secretariat to form the new Department of Wellness, Culture and Sport.

== Health authorities ==
The Department of Health funds two health authorities to deliver operational medical services in the province:

- Horizon Health Network
- Vitalité Health Network

== Ministers ==
#	Minister	Term	Administration
Minister of Health and Labour
1.	William Roberts	October 4, 1918 – February 28, 1923	under Foster
	William Roberts (continued)	February 28, 1923 – September 10, 1925	under Véniot
2.	Henry I. Taylor	September 14, 1925 – May 18, 1931	under Baxter
	Henry I. Taylor (continued)	May 18, 1931 – June 11, 1933	under Richards
	Henry I. Taylor (continued)	June 11, 1933 – July 12, 1935	under L. P. D. Tilley
	William Roberts (2nd time)	July 16, 1935 – February 10, 1938	under Dysart
	John B. McNair (acting)	February 10, 1938 – July 16, 1938	under Dysart
3.	Pio Laporte	July 16, 1938 – July 29, 1939	under Dysart
	John B. McNair (acting again)	July 30, 1939 – March 13, 1940	under Dysart
4.	J. André Doucet	March 13, 1940 – September 27, 1944	under McNair
Minister of Health
5.	Frederic McGrand	September 27, 1944 – October 8, 1952	under McNair
6.	John F. McInerney	October 8, 1952 – July 8, 1960	under Flemming
7.	Georges Dumont	July 8, 1960 – July 4, 1966	under Robichaud
8.	Stephen Weyman	September 15, 1966 – November 20, 1967	under Robichaud
9.	Norbert Thériault	November 20, 1967 – November 12, 1970	under Robichaud
10.	Paul Creaghan	November 12, 1970 – July 18, 1972	under Hatfield
11.	Lawrence Garvie	July 18, 1972 – December 3, 1974	under Hatfield
12.	G. W. N. Cockburn	December 3, 1974 – December 20, 1976	under Hatfield
13.	Brenda Robertson	December 20, 1976 – October 30, 1982	under Hatfield
14.	Charles Gallagher	October 30, 1982 – October 3, 1985	under Hatfield
Minister of Health and Community Services
15.	Nancy Clark Teed	October 3, 1985 – October 27, 1987	under Hatfield
16.	Raymond Frenette	October 27, 1987 – October 9, 1991	under McKenna
17.	Russell King	October 9, 1991 – October 14, 1997	under McKenna
	Russell King (continued)	October 14, 1997 – May 14, 1998	under Frenette
18.	Ann Breault	May 14, 1998 – June 21, 1999	under Thériault
Minister of Health and Wellness
19.	Dennis Furlong^{1}	June 21, 1999 – October 9, 2001	under Lord
20.	Elvy Robichaud	October 9, 2001 – February 14, 2006	under Lord
Minister of Health
21.	Brad Green	February 14, 2006 – October 3, 2006	under Lord
22.	Mike Murphy	October 3, 2006 – June 22, 2009	under Graham
23.	Mary Schryer	June 22, 2009 – October 12, 2010	under Graham
24.	Madeleine Dube	October 12, 2010 – September 5, 2012	under Alward
25.	Ted Flemming	September 6, 2012 – October 7, 2014	under Alward
26.	Victor Boudreau	October 7, 2014 – September 4, 2017	under Gallant
27.	Benoit Bourque	September 4, 2017 – November 9, 2018	under Gallant
28.	Ted Flemming	November 9, 2018 – September 29, 2020	under Higgs
29.	Dorothy Shephard	September 29, 2020 – July 15, 2022	under Higgs
30.	Bruce Fitch	July 15, 2022 – November 2, 2024	under Higgs
31.	John Dornan	November 2, 2024 – Present	Under Holt

^{1} Furlong was Minister of Health and Community Services until March 23, 2000 after which he was Minister of Health and Wellness.
