= Arthur Buck =

Canadian politician

Member of the Legislative Assembly of New Brunswick
- In office 1970–1974
- Constituency: Moncton

Personal details
- Born: August 28, 1935 (age 90) Moncton, New Brunswick
- Party: Progressive Conservative Party of New Brunswick
- Spouse: Sonja Irene Marie Jensen
- Children: 3
- Occupation: marketing manager

Arthur Hiram Buck (born August 28, 1935) is a former Canadian politician. He represented the electoral district of Moncton in the Legislative Assembly of New Brunswick from 1970 to 1974 as a member of the Progressive Conservative Party.
