= Francine Landry =

Canadian politician

Francine Landry MLA
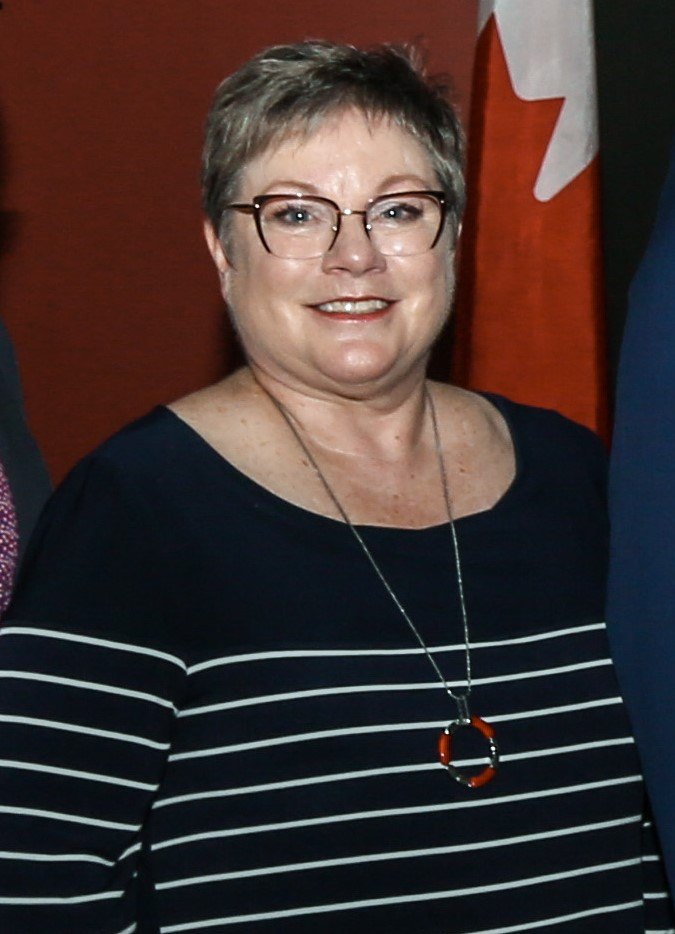
- Landry in 2018

Speaker of the New Brunswick Legislative Assembly
- Incumbent
- Assumed office November 1, 2024
- Preceded by: Bill Oliver

Minister of Economic Development
- In office June 6, 2016 – November 8, 2018
- Premier: Brian Gallant
- Preceded by: Rick Doucet
- Succeeded by: Mary Wilson

Minister of Economic Development
- In office June 6, 2016 – November 8, 2018
- Premier: Brian Gallant
- Preceded by: Rick Doucet
- Succeeded by: Mary Wilson

Minister of Post-Secondary Education, Training, and Labour
- In office October 7, 2014 – June 6, 2016
- Premier: Brian Gallant
- Preceded by: Jody Carr
- Succeeded by: Brian Kenny

Member of the New Brunswick Legislative Assembly for Madawaska les Lacs-Edmundston
- Incumbent
- Assumed office September 22, 2014
- Preceded by: Yvon Bonenfant

Personal details
- Born: June 14, 1958 (age 68)
- Party: Liberal

Francine Danielle Landry is a Canadian politician who was elected to the Legislative Assembly of New Brunswick in the 2014 provincial election. She represents the electoral district of Madawaska-les-Lacs-Edmundston as a member of the Liberal Party. She served as a Minister in the Gallant administration. She was re-elected in the 2018 and 2020 provincial elections. As of September 8, 2024, she serves as Liberal caucus chair and the Official Opposition critic for Environment and Climate Change.

== Electoral record ==
2024 New Brunswick general election: Madawaska Les Lacs-Edmundston
Party	Candidate	Votes	%	±%
Liberal	Francine Landry	4,798	67.1%	+0.56
Progressive Conservative	Michel Morin	1,970	27.5%	+1.90
Green	Alain Martel	218	3.0%	-4.87
New Democratic	André Martin	114	1.6%	
Consensus NB	Richard Barahoga	53	0.7%	
Total valid votes		7,153		
Total rejected ballots				
Turnout				
Eligible voters				
Liberal hold		Swing		
Source: Elections New Brunswick
