= Yvon Bonenfant =

Canadian politician

MLA for Madawaska-les-Lacs
- In office October 12, 2010 – 2014
- Preceded by: Jeannot Volpé
- Succeeded by: riding dissolved

Personal details
- Party: Progressive Conservative

Yvon Bonenfant is a Canadian politician, who was elected to the Legislative Assembly of New Brunswick in the 2010 provincial election. He represented the electoral district of Madawaska-les-Lacs as a member of the Progressive Conservatives until the 2014 provincial election, when he was defeated by Francine Landry in the redistributed riding of Madawaska-les-Lacs-Edmundston.
