= John Dornan (politician) =

Canadian politician

The Honourable John Dornan MLA

Minister of Health
- Incumbent
- Assumed office November 2, 2024
- Premier: Susan Holt
- Preceded by: Bruce Fitch

Member of the New Brunswick Legislative Assembly for Saint John Portland-Simonds
- Incumbent
- Assumed office October 21, 2024
- Preceded by: Trevor Holder

Personal details
- Born: 1958 or 1959 (age 66–67)
- Party: Liberal
- Occupation: Endocrinologist, politician

John Dornan MLA is a Canadian politician and physician who has been serving as the minister of Health since November 2, 2024. He was elected to the Legislative Assembly of New Brunswick in the 2024 election. A member of the New Brunswick Liberal Association, he represents the district of Saint John Portland-Simonds. Before entering politics, he was a medical doctor and the CEO of Horizon Health Network.

== Early life and career ==
Dornan was born in 1958 or 1959.

Dornan has practiced as a doctor in New Brunswick since 1987, where he worked at the Saint John Regional Hospital as an endocrinologist. He has fellowships in internal medicine, endocrinology and metabolism from the Royal College of Physicians and Surgeons of Canada. He worked at Saint John Regional Hospital as its regional chief of staff and the department head of internal medicine. In 2008 and 2009, Dornan served as the interim head of the hospital's emergency department for eight months.

Dornan also holds a Master of Business Administration and helped Dalhousie University, where he is an assistant professor, establish a satellite residency program in New Brunswick.

=== Horizon Health Network leadership and lawsuit ===
In August 2021, Dornan became the interim president and CEO of Horizon Health Network during the COVID-19 pandemic and became its permanent head in March 2022 with a five-year contract. Four months later, after the death of a patient in the Dr. Everett Chalmers Regional Hospital in Fredericton, Premier Blaine Higgs publicly announced Dornan's termination during a July 2022 press conference, alongside the removal of Dorothy Shephard as health minister and the firing of the Horizon and Vitalité Health Network boards.

Dornan filed an unjust dismissal case pursuant to the province's Public Service Labour Relations Act. In February 2023, an adjudicator awarded him $1.8 million in lost salary, pension, and benefits as well as $200,000 in aggravated damages for "breach of the employer's implied obligation to act in good faith when dismissing him." The $2 million award was the largest employment compensation award in provincial history. The provincial government sought judicial review, but the Court of King's Bench of New Brunswick upheld the decision in December 2023. The province announced its intent to appeal the decision. In April 2024, a week after Dornan announced that he would be seeking to enter provincial politics and just as the matter was about to be heard by the Court of Appeal of New Brunswick, the province announced that it had settled the matter with Dornan and was withdrawing its appeal.

== Political career ==
In April 2024, Dornan announced that he would seek the provincial Liberal nomination in the riding of Saint John Portland-Simonds, where the incumbent Progressive Conservative MLA Trevor Holder had decided not to seek re-election for the 2024 New Brunswick general election after disagreeing with Premier Blaine Higgs's leadership style. Dornan became the official candidate the following month.

Dornan was elected in October 2024, defeating the Progressive Conservative candidate and retired Royal Canadian Navy captain Paul Dempsey. It was the first time the riding or previous iterations of it, had gone Liberal since Holder's first electoral win in 1999. Dornan was speculated to as a possible choice to serve as Minister of Health under premier-designate Susan Holt. On November 1, 2024, it was announced that he was placed on the cabinet as Minister of Health.

== Electoral record ==
2024 New Brunswick general election: Saint John Portland-Simonds
Party	Candidate	Votes	%	±%
Liberal	John Dornan	3,546	53.38	+24.8
Progressive Conservative	Paul Dempsey	2,497	37.59	-17.2
Green	P. J. Duncan	438	6.59	-2.0
New Democratic	~~Bobby Martin~~	162	2.44	-0.3
Total valid votes		6,481	97.24	
Total rejected ballots		179	2.76	
Turnout		6,660	54.83	
Eligible voters		12,147		
Liberal gain from Progressive Conservative		Swing		+21.0
Source: Elections New Brunswick
