= Claudius Léger =

Canadian politician (1920–2014)

Claudius J. L. Léger

Member of the Legislative Assembly of New Brunswick
- In office 1948–1952
- Constituency: Moncton

Personal details
- Born: September 9, 1920 Saint John, New Brunswick
- Died: September 4, 2014 (aged 93) Riverside-Albert, New Brunswick
- Party: New Brunswick Liberal Association
- Spouse: Julia Bowser (m.1987)
- Occupation: notary public, lawyer, judge

Joseph Claudius Ignace deLoyo Léger (September 9, 1920 – September 4, 2014) was a Canadian politician. He served in the Legislative Assembly of New Brunswick as member of the Liberal party from 1948 to 1952.
