= R. V. Lenihan =

Canadian politician (1929–2002)

Robert V. Lenihan

Member of the Legislative Assembly of New Brunswick
- In office 1967–1970
- Constituency: Moncton

Personal details
- Born: July 19, 1929 Saint John, New Brunswick
- Died: November 20, 2002 (aged 73) Saint John, New Brunswick
- Party: New Brunswick Liberal Association
- Spouse: Mary Elizabeth Russell
- Children: 3
- Occupation: travel agent

Robert Vincent Lenihan (July 19, 1929 – November 20, 2002) was a Canadian politician. He served in the Legislative Assembly of New Brunswick from 1967 to 1970 as member of the Liberal party. He lived in Moncton, where he owned a travel agency and also hosted radio show.
