= J. L. A. Savoie =

Member of the Legislative Assembly of New Brunswick
- In office 1967–1969
- Constituency: Northumberland

Personal details
- Born: July 8, 1924 Neguac, New Brunswick
- Died: April 19, 1969 (aged 44) McGivney, New Brunswick
- Party: New Brunswick Liberal Association
- Spouse: Therese Paulin
- Children: 2
- Occupation: dentist

Joseph Luc Alfred Savoie (July 8, 1924 – April 19, 1969) was a Canadian politician. He served in the Legislative Assembly of New Brunswick from 1967 to 1969 as a member of the Liberal party.

Savoie was killed at the age of 44 after his automobile collided with a CN passenger train at a crossing.
