= E. A. Fryers =

Canadian politician

Member of the Legislative Assembly of New Brunswick
- In office 1948–1952
- Constituency: Moncton

Personal details
- Born: Ernest Alonzo Fryers; January 25, 1913 Moncton, New Brunswick
- Died: January 9, 1988 (aged 74) Moncton, New Brunswick
- Party: New Brunswick Liberal Association

Ernest Alonzo Fryers (January 25, 1913 – January 9, 1988) was a Canadian politician. He served in the Legislative Assembly of New Brunswick as member of the Liberal party from 1948 to 1952. He died at a hospital in Moncton in 1988.
