= Pio Laporte =

Canadian politician

Pio H. Laporte
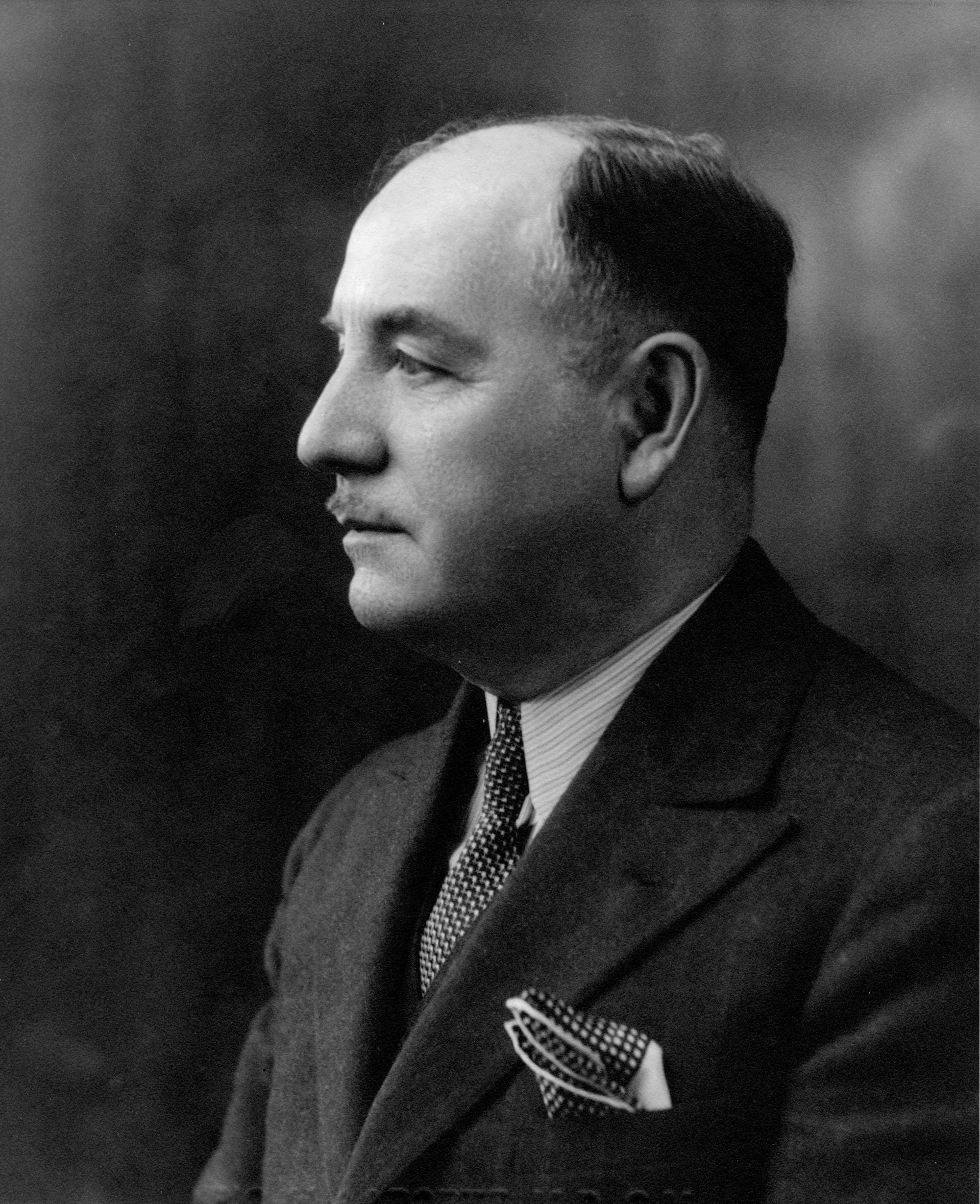
- Laporte, pictured between 1938 or 1939
- Born: September 1, 1878; Verchères, Quebec; Canada
- Died: July 29, 1939 (aged 60); Saint-Basile, New Brunswick
- Education: Laval University; Paris School of Medicine
- Occupations: Physician, Politician
- Political party: Liberal
- Spouse: Émilienne Hervieux
- Children: 3 children
- Parent(s): Jean-Baptiste Laporte & Marie le Noblet Duplessis

Pio H. Laporte (MD) (September 1, 1878 - July 29, 1939) was a Canadian physician and politician in the Province of New Brunswick.

Born in Verchères, Quebec, Pio Laporte studied medicine at Laval University in Quebec City then at the Paris School of Medicine in Paris, France. By 1903, he had made his home in Edmundston, New Brunswick where he practised medicine and was on the staff of the Hôtel-Dieu in nearby Saint-Basile.

Pio Laporte entered municipal politics, serving as president of the local school board and mayor of Edmundston. In 1935 he moved into provincial politics and was elected to the 38th New Brunswick Legislative Assembly as the Liberal Party candidate for the riding of Madawaska County. His Party won power and new Premier Allison Dysart immediately appointed Laporte to his Cabinet as the Minister of Health and Labour.

Doctor Pio Laporte died while in office in 1939 as a result of an automobile accident.

New Brunswick provincial government of Allison Dysart
Cabinet post (1)
Predecessor	Office	Successor
John B. McNair	'Minister of Health and Labour'; 1938-1939	John B. McNair (acting)
