= William R. Duffie =

Canadian politician (1931–1999)

William Rutledge "Bill" Duffie (April 5, 1931 – April 7, 1999) was a forestry engineer and political figure in New Brunswick, Canada. He represented Sunbury County in the Legislative Assembly of New Brunswick from 1960 to 1970 as a Liberal member.

He was born in Oromocto, New Brunswick, the son of Frank C. Duffie and Francis W. Rutledge. Duffie was educated at the University of New Brunswick. He married Anne Marie Amos in 1962. He was a member of the province's Executive Council, serving as Minister of Youth and Welfare from 1960 to 1966 and Minister of Natural Resources from 1966 to 1970. Duffie also served as mayor of Oromocto.

An annual scholarship is awarded in his name to a student studying in a health care discipline.
