= Department of Economic Development (New Brunswick) =

Economic Development Department of Government of New Brunswick

The Department of Economic Development is a department in the Government of New Brunswick. It is charged with stimulating economic prosperity and global competitiveness in the province.

Created in 1944 during war time as the Department of Industry and Reconstruction, the Department has since had several name changes and has been known as the Department of Industry, Department of Economic Growth, and Department of Economic Development, Tourism and Culture.

The department was renamed Business New Brunswick on March 23, 2000 when Premier Bernard Lord restructured the New Brunswick Cabinet. It was created by subdividing the then Department of Economic Development, Tourism and Culture. It was enlarged on October 9, 2001 when it absorbed the Department of Investment and Exports which has also been originally created from Economic Development, Tourism and Culture.

On October 12, 2010, the then premier David Alward named a Minister of Economic Development with responsibility for Business New Brunswick. The name of the department was officially changed to the Department of Economic Development on December 17, 2010.

Since April 1, 2015, provincial Crown corporation Opportunities NB (ONB) has served as New Brunswick’s lead economic development agency mandated with fostering economic and business growth.

== Ministers ==
Minister	Term	Administration
Minister of Industry and Reconstruction
J. André Doucet*	September 27, 1944 - October 8, 1952	under John B. McNair
Minister of Industry and Development
J. Roger Pichette	October 8, 1952 - July 12, 1960	under Hugh John Flemming
J. Michel Fournier	July 12, 1960 - April 22, 1963	under Louis Robichaud
Minister of Finance and Industry
see Minister of Finance	July 8, 1963 - April 1, 1968	under Louis Robichaud
Minister of Economic Growth
Robert J. Higgins	April 1, 1968 - February 11, 1970	under Louis Robichaud
H. H. Williamson	February 11, 1970 - November 12, 1970	under Louis Robichaud
A. Edison Stairs	November 12, 1970 - July 18, 1972	under Richard Hatfield
Paul Creaghan	July 18, 1972 - December 3, 1974	under Richard Hatfield
Lawrence Garvie	December 3, 1974 - December 20, 1976	under Richard Hatfield
Minister of Commerce and Development
Gerald Merrithew	December 20, 1976 - October 30, 1982	under Richard Hatfield
Paul Dawson	October 30, 1982 - October 3, 1985	under Richard Hatfield
Minister of Commerce and Technology
Fernand Dubé	October 3, 1985 - October 27, 1987	under Richard Hatfield
A. W. Lacey	October 27, 1987 - December 19, 1990	under Frank McKenna
Allan Maher (acting)	January 21, 1991 - October 9, 1991	under Frank McKenna
Minister of Economic Development and Tourism
Denis Losier	October 9, 1991 - August 3, 1994	under Frank McKenna
Leo McAdam	August 11, 1994 - September 26, 1995	under Frank McKenna
Camille Thériault	September 26, 1995 - February 6, 1998	under Frank McKenna
James Lockyer (acting)	February 6, 1998 - May 14, 1998	under Ray Frenette
Minister of Economic Development, Culture and Tourism
Roly MacIntyre	May 14, 1998 - June 21, 1999	under Camille Thériault
Peter Mesheau	June 21, 1999 - March 23, 2000	under Bernard Lord
Minister of Business New Brunswick
Joan MacAlpine	March 23, 2000 - October 9, 2001	under Bernard Lord
Norman Betts	October 9, 2001 - June 27, 2003	under Bernard Lord
Peter Mesheau	June 27, 2003 - February 14, 2006	under Bernard Lord
Kirk MacDonald	February 14, 2006 - October 3, 2006	under Bernard Lord
Greg Byrne	October 3, 2006 - June 22, 2009	under Shawn Graham
Victor Boudreau	June 22, 2009 - October 12, 2010	under Shawn Graham
Minister of Economic Development
Paul Robichaud	October 12, 2010 – September 23, 2013	under David Alward
Bruce Fitch	September 23, 2013 - October 7, 2014	under David Alward
Rick Doucet	October 7, 2014 - June 6, 2016	under Brian Gallant
Francine Landry	June 6, 2016 - November 8, 2018	under Brian Gallant
	Minister of Economic Development and Small Business, and minister responsible for Opportunities NB	
Mary Wilson	November 9, 2018 - September 29, 2020	under Blaine Higgs
Arlene Dunn	September 29, 2020 - June 27, 2023	under Blaine Higgs
Greg Turner	June 27, 2023 - November 2, 2024	under Blaine Higgs
Luke Randall	November 2, 2024 - Present	under Susan Holt

*Doucet was minister of industry and reconstruction until 1948 and was thereafter minister of industry and development.
