= T. Babbitt Parlee =

Canadian politician

His Worship T. Babbitt Parlee

Mayor of Moncton, New Brunswick
- In office 1950–1952
- Preceded by: F. W. Storey
- Succeeded by: Arthur E. Stone

Personal details
- Born: March 13, 1914 Sussex, New Brunswick
- Died: January 22, 1957 (aged 42) 14 miles west of Harcourt, New Brunswick
- Cause of death: Airplane crash

The Hon. T. Babbitt Parlee

MLA for Moncton

Personal details
- Party: Progressive Conservative Party of New Brunswick
- Spouse: Evelyn Moran
- Education: University of New Brunswick
- Profession: Politician
- Cabinet: Minister of Municipal Affairs (1954)

Thomas Babbitt Parlee (March 13, 1914 – January 22, 1957) was a lawyer and political figure in New Brunswick, Canada.

== Biography ==
=== Early life and education ===
He was born in Sussex, New Brunswick, the son of William King Crawford Parlee and Jennie Hodge Babbit. He was educated at the University of New Brunswick and Dalhousie University. In 1948, Parlee married Evelyn Moran.

=== Political career ===
He served on city council from 1944 to 1948 and was mayor of Moncton from 1950 to 1952. He served as president of the province's Executive Council in 1952. That year, as a Progressive Conservative, he and his running mate Joseph W. Bourgeois won two City of Moncton seats in the Legislative Assembly of New Brunswick, defeating incumbent C. H. Blakeney and Claudius Leger. After the election, in 1954 he was named Minister of Municipal Affairs.

=== Death ===
On January 23, 1957, Parlee and two other men died when their plane crashed in Kent County during a snow storm. He was flying from Fredericton to Moncton. The wreckage was discovered that May. Parlee Beach was named after him in 1959.
