= Richard Hutchison =

Canadian politician

Member of the Canadian Parliament for Northumberland
- In office 1868–1872
- Preceded by: John Mercer Johnson
- Succeeded by: Peter Mitchell

Personal details
- Born: January 20, 1812 Mearns, Renfrewshire, Scotland
- Died: September 27, 1891 (aged 79) Douglastown, New Brunswick
- Party: Liberal
- Spouse: Elizabeth Mackie
- Occupation: Lumber merchant

Richard Hutchison (January 20, 1812 – September 27, 1891) was a New Brunswick businessman and political figure. He represented Northumberland in the House of Commons of Canada as a Liberal member from 1868 to 1872.

He was born in Renfrewshire, Scotland in 1812, the son of David Hutchison. He was educated there and came to New Brunswick in 1826. In 1840, Hutchison married Elizabeth Mackie. He was a lumber merchant in the Glasgow-based firm Gilmour, Rankin & Co (a branch of Pollok, Gilmour and Company) which operated on the Miramichi River; by 1852, he was the sole resident partner and he was given control of the operation in 1870. Hutchison represented Northumberland County in the Legislative Assembly of New Brunswick from 1864 to 1866. He was elected to the House of Commons in an 1868 by-election held after the death of John Mercer Johnson.

His son Ernest later represented Northumberland in the Legislative Assembly of New Brunswick.

== Electoral record ==
Canadian federal by-election, 24 December 1868
Party	Candidate	Votes	%	±%
On the death of John Mercer Johnson, 11 August 1868
Liberal	Richard Hutchison	1,133	55.90	-5.93
Unknown	? Gough	894	44.10	Ø
Total valid votes		2,027	100.00	
