= P. C. Price =

Canadian politician

Member of the Legislative Assembly of New Brunswick
- In office 1957–1960
- Constituency: Northumberland

Personal details
- Born: December 25, 1888 Parker’s Ridge, New Brunswick
- Died: February 7, 1961 (aged 72) Newcastle, New Brunswick
- Party: New Brunswick Liberal Association
- Spouse: Mildred E. Russell
- Children: 1
- Occupation: lumberman

Perley Cleveland Price (December 25, 1888 – February 7, 1961) was a Canadian politician. He served in the Legislative Assembly of New Brunswick from 1957 to 1960 as member of the Liberal party.
