= Paul Lordon =

Canadian politician

Paul B. Lordon

Member of the Legislative Assembly of New Brunswick
- In office 1960–1961
- Constituency: Northumberland

Personal details
- Born: January 24, 1915 Bathurst, New Brunswick
- Died: November 9, 1992 (aged 77) Chatham, New Brunswick
- Party: New Brunswick Liberal Association
- Spouse: Cecilia Frances Dolan
- Occupation: lawyer

Paul Benedict Lordon (January 24, 1915 – November 9, 1992) was a Canadian politician. He served in the Legislative Assembly of New Brunswick from 1960 to 1961 as member of the Liberal party. Lordon was a lawyer, maintaining a practice in the town of Chatham, NB for many years. He was a longtime solicitor for the town. He died in 1992 after crashing his vehicle into a utility pole.
