= Clarence S. Menzies =

Canadian politician

Clarence Stanley Menzies
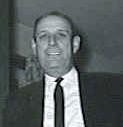

Member of the Legislative Assembly of New Brunswick
- In office 1960–1974
- Constituency: Northumberland

Personal details
- Born: April 29, 1915 Whitneyville, New Brunswick
- Died: July 20, 1989 (aged 74) Northumberland County, New Brunswick
- Party: New Brunswick Liberal Association
- Spouse: Gertrude Evelyn Sharpe d. 1964
- Children: 3 - Betty (Parks) Frank and Joan (Somers)
- Education: Fredericton agricultural College
- Occupation: Owner of a lumber company, farming, worked for Fraser’ pulp mill, Warden of Northumberland, MLA politician Liberal Party

Clarence Stanley Menzies (April 29, 1915 – July 20, 1989) was a Canadian politician. He served in the Legislative Assembly of New Brunswick from 1960 to 1974 as member of the Liberal party.

Life Story (Taken from the book his sister Doreen Menzies Arbuckle published in 1978 called “The Northwest Miramichi”

Clarence was the youngest child and only son of Frank and Bessie (Curtis) Menzies. He was named “Clarence Stanley” after his father’s brother, Stanley Clarence Menzies. Clarence went to public school in Whitney NB and to high school at the Boom Road Surperior school, followed by a course of studies at the Fredericton Agricultural College. As a young man he too, an active part in his father’s lumbering operations, which consisted of cutting and sawing logs under contract. In a few years he was placed in charge of the lumber camp, and was soon familiar with all the activities. In the summers, Clarence was engaged in trucking lumber, and also firewood, a by-product of the operations. The sites of the woods work included Little South West, Trout Brook, Maple Glen, and Weaver Siding all which are located in Miramichi, New Brunswick. There was custom sawing to be done with the portable mill in various other locations along the Miramichi River.

Clarence took over the lumber business when his father Frank A. Menzies accepted the position of High Sheriff, but after some years when the lumber markets declined, Clarence discontinued operations and sold the mill. He continued working in farming, and worked at the Fraser Companies’ pulp mill, North West Bridge until he resigned in 1960.

He was elected in the Fall of 1951 to a four-year term on the Northumberland County Council. One of the two councillors representing North Esk Parish, he served 12 years, 1952-1963 inclusive. He was chosen by the council at its annual meeting in February 1958 to be County Warden for a two-year period. During 1957, while Clarence was a member of the Public Works Committee, the Court House went under extensive renovations and exterior cleaning. He served for a time as member of the County School Finance Board, as his father done.

For over fourteen years, Clarence Menzies was a Liberal Member of the New Brunswick Legislature Assembly, one of four (and later, five) members representing the multiple-member constituency of Northumberland. First elected in the general election on June 27, 1960, he was subsequently returned to office on April 22, 1963; October 23, 1967 ; and October 26, 1970. He did not seek the Liberal nomination for the election of November 18, 1974.

[2] https://leglibbibcat.legnb.ca/bib/27189

to be continued
