= Jean Marc Michaud =

Canadian politician

Member of the Legislative Assembly of New Brunswick
- In office 1960–1963
- Constituency: Madawaska

Personal details
- Born: October 24, 1923 Edmundston, New Brunswick
- Died: August 26, 2008 (aged 84) Edmundston, New Brunswick
- Party: New Brunswick Liberal Association
- Spouse: Lucille Massey
- Children: 3
- Occupation: lawyer

Jean-Marc Michaud (October 24, 1923 – August 26, 2008) was a Canadian politician. He served in the Legislative Assembly of New Brunswick from 1960 to 1963 as a member of the Liberal party. He is the son of Joseph-Enoil Michaud, who served in the Canadian Parliament.
