= H. S. Murray =

Canadian politician

Member of the Legislative Assembly of New Brunswick
- In office 1944–1956
- Constituency: Northumberland

Personal details
- Born: February 4, 1894 Murray Road, New Brunswick
- Died: January 9, 1963 (aged 68) Chatham, New Brunswick
- Party: New Brunswick Liberal Association
- Spouse: Vera A. Murray
- Occupation: teacher, lawyer, businessman

Herman Stephen Murray (February 4, 1894 – January 9, 1963) was a Canadian politician. He served in the Legislative Assembly of New Brunswick as member of the Liberal party from 1944 to 1956.
