= Joseph R. Martin =

Canadian politician

Member of the Legislative Assembly of New Brunswick
- In office 1957–1960
- Constituency: Northumberland

Personal details
- Born: August 1, 1926 Chatham, New Brunswick
- Died: February 17, 2008 (aged 81) Miramichi, New Brunswick
- Party: Progressive Conservative
- Spouse: Lois Fraser Morell
- Education: Dalhousie Law School
- Occupation: lawyer

Joseph Robert Martin (August 1, 1926 – February 17, 2008) was a Canadian politician. He served in the Legislative Assembly of New Brunswick from 1957 to 1960 as a member of the Progressive Conservative Party.
