= Gilbert Robichaud =

Member of the Legislative Assembly of New Brunswick
- In office 1960–1967
- Constituency: Moncton

Personal details
- Born: February 4, 1918 Shippegan, New Brunswick
- Died: June 24, 1997 (aged 79) Moncton, New Brunswick
- Party: New Brunswick Liberal Association
- Spouse: Anne-Marie Cormier
- Children: 11
- Occupation: insurance agent

Gilbert Robichaud (February 4, 1918 – June 24, 1997) was a Canadian politician. He served in the Legislative Assembly of New Brunswick from 1960 to 1967 as member of the Liberal party.

In 1963 he sponsored the passage of the charter of the Université de Moncton in the Legislative Assembly.
