= Norman Buchanan =

Canadian politician

Norman Bruce Buchanan
- Born: September 16, 1915; St. Stephen, New Brunswick
- Died: June 27, 2008 (aged 92)
- Allegiance: Canada
- Branch: Canadian Forces
- Rank: Lieutenant Colonel
- Awards: Military Cross (three times)
- Other work: furniture retailer and political figure

Norman Bruce Buchanan, MC & Two Bars (September 16, 1915 – June 27, 2008) was a furniture retailer and political figure in the Province of New Brunswick, Canada. He represented Charlotte County in the Legislative Assembly of New Brunswick as a Progressive Conservative member from 1952 to 1960.

Buchanan was born in St. Stephen, New Brunswick, the son of Walter Bruce Buchanan and Leola Amelia McWin. He was educated at the University of New Brunswick and the Royal Military College of Canada.

A gifted athlete, Buchanan was a pitcher on the 1936 St. Croixs baseball team that won the New Brunswick Senior Baseball League Championship and the Maritime Senior Baseball Championship. He worked in the family's retail furniture business until the outbreak of World War II. He served overseas in the Royal Canadian Army, rising to the rank of Major. He was awarded the Military Cross with two bars for acts of exemplary gallantry during active operations against the enemy on land. In 1944 he married Janetta C. Wilson. Their first child, a daughter Janice, was born in 1945 in Irving, Ayrshire, Scotland.

== Military career ==
Lt Col Norman Buchanan attended and graduated from the Royal Military College of Canada in 1939. He subsequently served at the Partridge Island Battery (Saint John, NB) from 1939 to 1940. Posted to England in 1940 he was seconded to the British Army and served in North Africa from 1942 to 1943. He then served with the 1st Canadian Division in Sicily and Italy in 1943 before moving to the 3rd Canadian Division France for the invasion of Normandy during the D-Day Landing of 1944. As a Forward Observation Officer (FOO) in World War II, Then Captain Norman Buchanan was awarded the Military Cross and subsequently two bars, for acts of exemplary gallantry during active operations against the enemy in North Africa and France. This distinction is held by only 23 Commonwealth Officers. Commencing in 2010, The Royal Regiment of Canadian Artillery School in CFB Gagetown, New Brunswick honours the top candidate of its Forward Observation Officer (FOO) Course with the presentation of the Norman Buchanan Award.

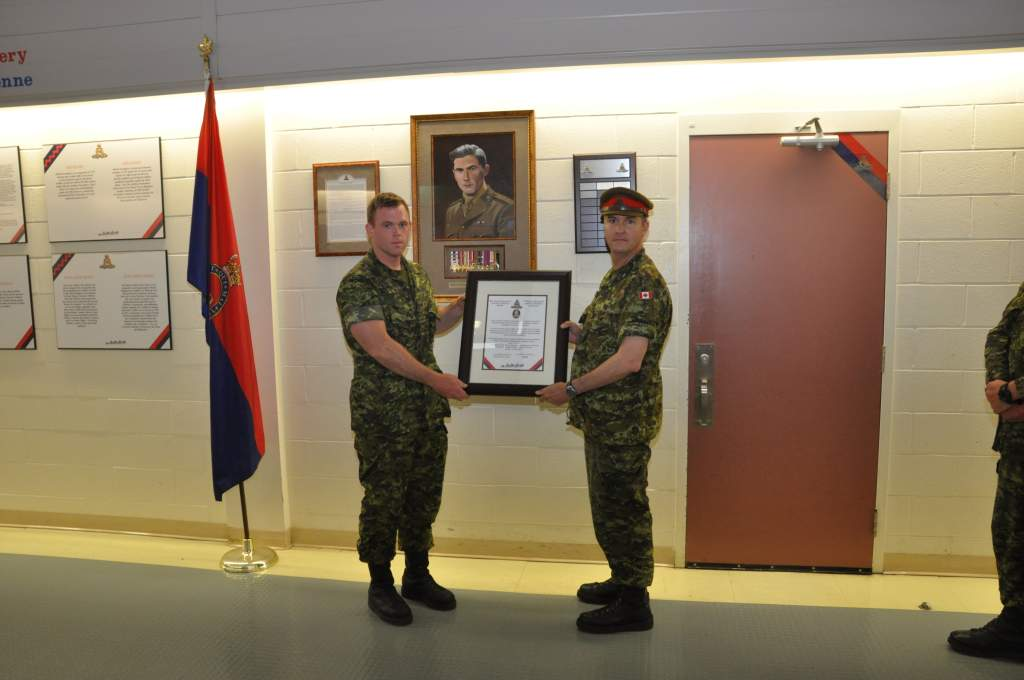
A Student on the Forward Observation Officer Course is presented with the Norman Buchcanan Award through distinguishing himself as the top Candidate. A portrait of Norman Buchanan along with reproduction medals and history are displayed in the background.

=== Military Cross Citations ===
MILITARY CROSS - Capt Buchanan, RCA, Seconded to the British 1st Army (RCA) Thala, North Africa (Tunisia), 22 February 1943

"During the night of February 23, 1943, He continually tried to rally the infantry who came streaming back through the battery position. He himself picketed the heights and took out patrols. He brought in one 6-pr Anti-tank Gun and rallied some A/Tk Gunners to man it. Throughout the next day, he manned a local OP firing the guns and shouting encouragement. When he could not knock out an Enemy OP with guns, he tried sniping them himself from his position. His example throughout was a source of inspiration to all his men."

1st BAR - Capt Buchanan, RCHA, 1 FD Regt RCHA, 1 Cdn Division (3 Cdn Inf Brigade) Gambatesa, Italy, 7 October 1943

"At about 1000 hours on 7 October 1943, Captain Buchanan, Troop Commander "F" Troop, 1Fd Regt RCHA, was Forward Observation Officer with the Carleton and York Regiment for the attack of the GAMBATESA feature (772232 162 GAMBATESA). Due to the nature of the terrain, it was necessary for Captain Buchanan to go forward on foot carrying an 18 set. As the leading platoon of the forward company, with which Captain Buchanan was working, approached a crest near the top of the feature, they came under heavy machine gun fire from enemy tanks in hull down positions, and the leading members of the platoon were hit. Captain Buchanan maintained communication with his battery all during the period thus providing continuous artillery fire in support of the leading troops. It was greatly due to the coolness, courage, and resourcefulness of Captain Buchanan that the leading platoon was able to hold the ground, and evacuate their wounded personnel."

2nd BAR - Capt Buchanan, RCA, 14 FD Regt RCA, 3 Cdn Division (9 Cdn Inf Brigade) Normandy, France, D+1 (7 June 1944)

"This Officer landed with reserve coy of the QOR of C as a FOO. During the confused fighting north of ST BERNIERES, his coolness under fire was an example to all. When another FOO was hit by Machine Gun Fire, Capt Buchanan collected a stretcher and OR and helped to carry him to safety. He moved with the SD and G Highrs of 9 Cdn Inf Bde on D plus 1 and occupied an advanced OP at Les Boissons; he remained in this OP continually for three days. During this period the position was attacked several times. During these attacks, Capt Buchanan not only effectively engaged the enemy with artillery fire, but he directed and organized the small heavy fire and his coolness and personality did a great deal towards steadying the ranks in the forward position. As other OP officers and the FOB came forward he directed their movement and ensured their safety. When 12 German tanks were sighted, he obtained a troop of Mediumss and ranged them on the target before the Medium OP arrived. The OP was finally sighted by a German tank and the Medium Officer killed by a direct hit. Capt Buchanan then directed the evacuation of the OP and occupied another a few yards to the flank. When finally received, all ranks in the forward position expressed their regrets at seeing him go. During these four days, Capt Buchanan's coolness, drive and utter disrespect for his own safety was an example to all and this, together with the effective artillery fire he brought to bear, was a major factor in holding the position."

== Political career ==
Norman Buchanan was elected to the Legislative Assembly as the Progressive Conservative Party candidate for the multi-member riding of Charlotte County. He was appointed by Premier Hugh John Flemming to the Cabinet, serving as Minister of Lands and Mines from 1952 to 1960. He ran unsuccessfully for the New Brunswick Southwest seat in the House of Commons of Canada in 1963. He also played a major part in bringing the FLAKEBOARD CO. to St Stephen. The Flakeboard Co. is one of St. Stephens largest employers.

=== Electoral history ===
1963 Canadian federal election: Charlotte
Party	Candidate	Votes	%	±%
Liberal	Allan McLean	6,279	53.0	+2.0
Progressive Conservative	Norman Buchanan	5,284	44.6	-1.1
Social Credit	David Cormack	159	1.3	*
New Democratic	George Cogswell	118	1.0	-2.3
Total valid votes		11,840	100.0	

New Brunswick provincial government of Hugh John Flemming
Cabinet post (1)
Predecessor	Office	Successor
Richard J. Gill	'Minister of Lands and Mines'; 1952–1960	Graham Crocker
