= Akerley Holmes =

Canadian politician

Akeley Holmes

Member of the Legislative Assembly of New Brunswick
- In office 1925–1930
- Constituency: Northumberland

Personal details
- Born: January 27, 1894 Doaktown, New Brunswick
- Died: November 10, 1946 (aged 52) Fredericton, New Brunswick
- Party: Conservative Party of New Brunswick
- Spouse(s): Elsie J. M. Murray (died); Grace Murray
- Children: three. Dr.James Murray Holmes, Amelia Grace Holmes, Elizabeth E. Holmes
- Occupation: Lumberman

Akeley Holmes (January 27, 1894 – November 10, 1946) was a Canadian politician. He served in the Legislative Assembly of New Brunswick as member of the Conservative party representing Northumberland County from 1925 to 1930.
