= Georges Dumont =

Canadian politician

Georges L. Dumont
- Born: 25 June 1898
- Died: 4 July 1966 (aged 68)
- Spouse: Elizabeth St. Pierre (m. 1923)

Georges L. Dumont (June 25, 1898 – July 4, 1966) was a physician and political figure in New Brunswick, Canada. He represented Restigouche County in the Legislative Assembly of New Brunswick as a Liberal member from 1960 to 1966.

He was born in Saint-Anselme, Quebec, the son of Gregoire Dumont and Gracieuse Boucher. Dumont was educated at the Université Laval. In 1923, he married Elizabeth St. Pierre. Dumont served as Minister of Health in the province's Executive Council from 1960 until his death in 1966.

The Dr. Georges-L.-Dumont University Hospital Centre in Moncton was named in his honour.

New Brunswick provincial government of Louis Robichaud
Cabinet post (1)
Predecessor	Office	Successor
John F. McInerney	'Minister of Health'; 1960-1966	Stephen Weyman
