= Hidulphe Savoie =

Canadian politician

Hidulphe A. Savoie (June 26, 1873 – November 14, 1961) was a general merchant and political figure in New Brunswick, Canada. He represented Northumberland County in the Legislative Assembly of New Brunswick from 1930 to 1948 as a Liberal member.

He was born in St-Louis-de-Kent, New Brunswick, the son of Michel Savoie and Julia Daigle. In 1899, he married Léonie Boucher. He ran unsuccessfully for a seat in the provincial assembly in 1925. Savoie also served as a member of the council for Northumberland County.
