= Ernest Hutchinson =

Canadian politician

David Alexander Ernest Hutchison (June 1, 1847 – December 4, 1918) was a lumber merchant and political figure in New Brunswick. He represented Northumberland County in the Legislative Assembly of New Brunswick from 1878 to 1882 and from 1886 to 1890.

He was born in Douglastown, New Brunswick, the son of Richard Hutchison, a former member of the provincial assembly, and educated in Chatham. In 1871, he married Jenny Johnston. He served as warden for Newcastle and a captain in the militia. Hutchison was defeated in his bid for reelection in 1882 but was elected again in 1886.
