= Lestock Graham DesBrisay =

Canadian politician

- Born: September 3, 1920; Campbellton, New Brunswick
- Died: 1988 (aged 67–68); Moncton, New Brunswick
- Education: Mount Allison University
- Occupations: Businessman, politician
- Political party: Liberal

Lestock Graham DesBrisay (September 3, 1920 – 1988) was a Canadian businessman and a politician in the Province of New Brunswick. He served as the governor of the Atlantic Provinces Chambers of Commerce from 1958 through 1959.

DesBrisay was born in 1920 in Campbellton. Almost always referred to as "L.G. DesBrisay", in the 1960 New Brunswick general election, he was elected to the Legislative Assembly as the Liberal Party candidate in the Moncton City riding. He was immediately appointed by new Premier Louis Robichaud to the Cabinet as Minister of Finance.

Lestock G. DesBrisay was reelected in 1963 and on July 8 was given the additional responsibility for the Department of Industry, serving as its Minister until April 1, 1968. He was reelected again in 1967, continuing as Minister of Finance until his government was defeated in the 1970 general election.

Lestock Graham DesBrisay was a descendant of Captain Théophile de la Cour DesBrisay (1671–1761) whose Huguenot ancestors fled religious persecution in France and settled in Dublin, Ireland before coming to Canada.

New Brunswick provincial government of Louis Robichaud
Cabinet posts (2)
Predecessor	Office	Successor
J. Michel Fournier	'Minister of Economic Growth'; 1963–1968 (Served simultaneously as Minister of Finance)	Robert J. Higgins
Donald D. Patterson	'Minister of Finance'; 1960–1970	Jean-Maurice Simard
