= Lucien Fortin =

Canadian politician

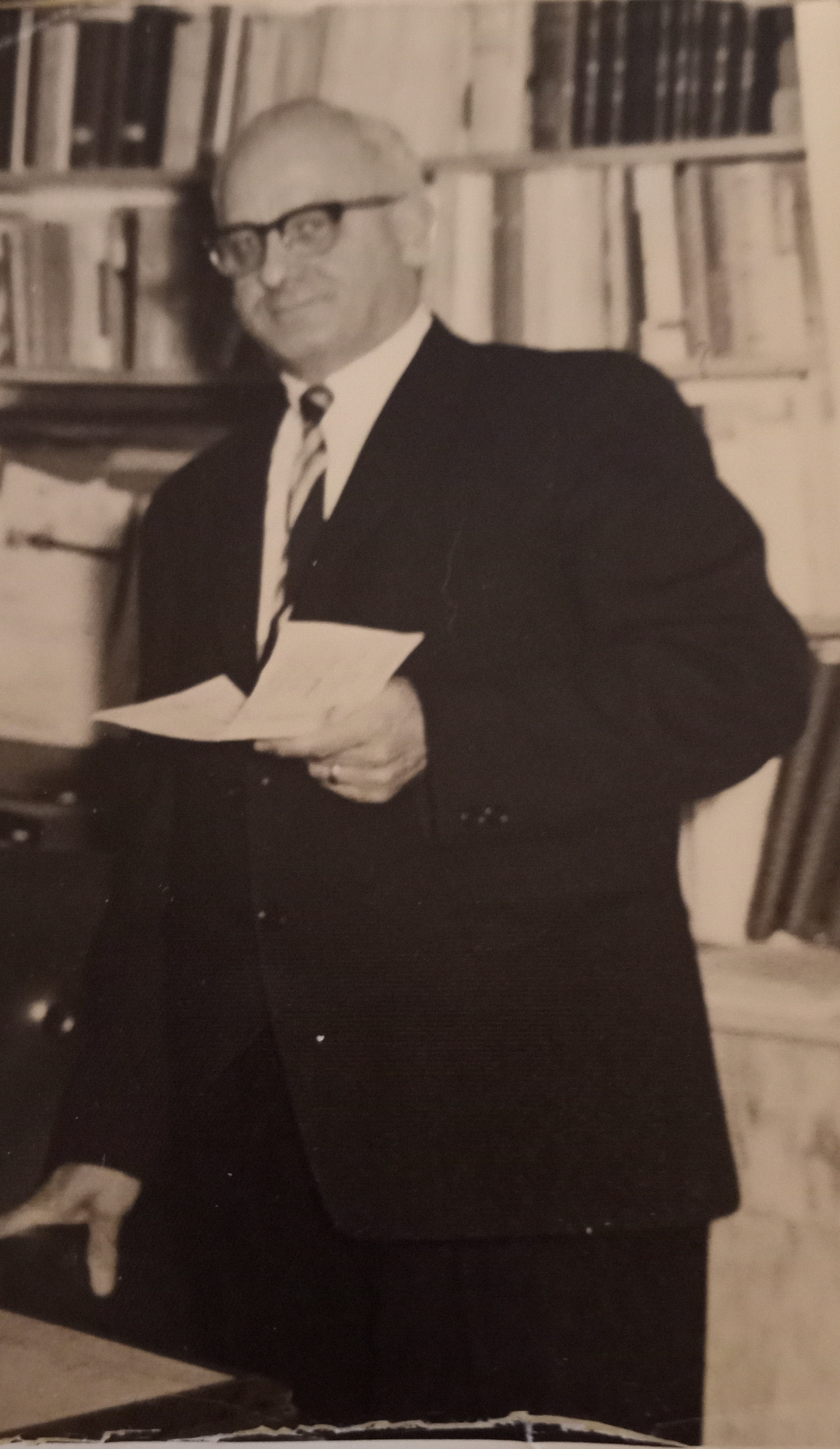

Member of the Legislative Assembly of New Brunswick
- In office 1952–1960
- Constituency: Madawaska

Personal details
- Born: October 18, 1912 Lemieux, Quebec
- Died: December 28, 1984 (aged 72) Saint-Jacques, New Brunswick
- Party: Progressive Conservative Party of New Brunswick
- Spouse: Regina Levesque
- Occupation: printer, editor

Marie Joseph Lucien Wilfred Fortin (October 18, 1912 – December 28, 1984) was a Canadian politician. He served in the Legislative Assembly of New Brunswick as member of the Progressive Conservative party from 1952 to 1960.
