= Thomas F. Gillespie =

Canadian politician

Thomas Francis Gillespie (December 15, 1838 – August 8, 1893) was an Irish-born merchant and political figure. He represented Northumberland County in the Legislative Assembly of New Brunswick from 1870 to 1874 and from 1878 to as a Conservative member.

He was born near Mallow in County Cork, the son of John Gillespie and Eliza Sheehan, and was educated at Rathkeale. Gillespie came to New Brunswick in 1848 and, in 1854, settled in Chatham, where he purchased an iron foundry. He also sold insurance and general merchandise. In 1855, Gillespie married Elizabeth Cormack. He was a justice of the peace and lieutenant colonel in the local militia. He ran unsuccessfully for a seat in the federal parliament in 1867 and ran unsuccessfully in a by-election for the provincial assembly in 1869 before being elected in 1870. He was defeated in his bid for reelection in 1874, then reelected in 1878 and 1882, but defeated in 1886 and an 1887 by-election.
