= Paul Mersereau (politician) =

Canadian politician

Member of the Legislative Assembly of New Brunswick
- In office 1952–1960
- Constituency: Sunbury

Personal details
- Born: February 10, 1903 Hoyt, New Brunswick
- Died: 1975 (aged 71–72)
- Party: Progressive Conservative Party of New Brunswick
- Spouse: Edith Mary Johnstone
- Children: 4
- Occupation: Canadian Pacific Railway agent

Paul Caleb Mersereau (February 10, 1903 – 1975) was a Canadian politician. He served in the Legislative Assembly of New Brunswick as member of the Progressive Conservative party from 1952 to 1960.
