= Reg MacDonald =

Canadian politician

Reginald "Reg" James Alexander MacDonald (May 29, 1934 - January 13, 2018) was a political figure in New Brunswick, Canada.

He represented Bay du Vin and then Southwest Miramichi in the Legislative Assembly of New Brunswick from 1978 to 1982 and from 1987 to 1999 as a Liberal member.

He was born in Miramichi, New Brunswick, and educated at the New Brunswick Technical Institute, McMaster University and Memorial University. MacDonald was an electrician, maintenance superintendent, marketing representative and technical sales representative. He was defeated in 1982. MacDonald served as party whip from 1987 to 1991. He served as Minister of State for Seniors. He was defeated when he ran for re-election in 1999. MacDonald later served as a member of the National Advisory Council on Aging.

MacDonald died on January 13, 2018, at the Saint John Regional Hospital in Saint John, New Brunswick, at the age of 83.
