= Patrick Guérette =

Canadian politician

Member of the Legislative Assembly of New Brunswick
- In office 1960–1967
- Constituency: Restigouche

Personal details
- Born: March 25, 1905 St. Quentin, New Brunswick
- Died: November 21, 1997 (aged 79) Campbellton, New Brunswick
- Party: New Brunswick Liberal Association
- Spouse: Germaine Normandeau
- Children: 7
- Occupation: businessman

Patrick Guérette (March 17, 1918 – November 21, 1997) was a Canadian politician. He served in the Legislative Assembly of New Brunswick from 1960 to 1967 as member of the Liberal party.
