= Harrison Monteith =

Canadian politician

Member of the Legislative Assembly of New Brunswick
- In office 1952–1960
- Constituency: Carleton

Personal details
- Born: May 8, 1913 Northampton, New Brunswick
- Died: September 24, 1997 (aged 84)
- Party: Progressive Conservative Party of New Brunswick
- Spouse: Agnes Nina Cook
- Education: Woodstock, New Brunswick
- Occupation: farmer

Harrison Charles Monteith (May 8, 1913 – September 24, 1997) was a Canadian politician. He served in the Legislative Assembly of New Brunswick as member of the Progressive Conservative party from 1952 to 1960.
