= William M. Bird =

Canadian politician

Member of the Legislative Assembly of New Brunswick
- In office 1952–1960
- Constituency: Madawaska

Personal details
- Born: February 2, 1889 Saint-Léonard, New Brunswick
- Died: October 5, 1967 (aged 78) Saint-Léonard, New Brunswick
- Party: Progressive Conservative Party of New Brunswick
- Spouse: Mary Jane Cyr
- Occupation: lumber merchant

William Malory Bird (February 2, 1889 – October 5, 1967) was a Canadian politician. He served in the Legislative Assembly of New Brunswick as member of the Progressive Conservative party from 1952 to 1960.
