= Arthur W. Carton =

Canadian politician (1886–1973)

Member of the Legislative Assembly of New Brunswick
- In office 1952–1960
- Constituency: Saint John County

Personal details
- Born: Arthur William Carton; November 16, 1886 Chicago, Illinois, U.S.
- Died: May 2, 1973 (aged 86) Saint John, New Brunswick, Canada
- Party: Progressive Conservative Party of New Brunswick

Arthur William Carton (November 16, 1886 – May 2, 1973) was a Canadian politician. He served in the Legislative Assembly of New Brunswick as member of the Progressive Conservative party from 1952 to 1960. Arthur William Carton was born on 16 November 1886 in Chicago, later settling in Fairville (now part of Saint John, NB), where he pursued a career as a high-school principal before entering politics. Elected at nearly age 66 during the 1952 general election, Carton represented Saint John County as a member of the Progressive Conservative Party of New Brunswick, serving through two successive assemblies (42nd, 1952–1956; 43rd, 1956–1960). He was re-elected in 1956 but lost his seat in the 1960 election; though he did not hold cabinet office, he supported Premier Hugh John Flemming’s regional economic development initiatives. After retiring from politics, Carton lived in Saint John until his death on 2 May 1973, aged 86.
