= William J. Gallant =

Canadian politician

Member of the Legislative Assembly of New Brunswick
- In office 1952–1960
- Constituency: Northumberland

Personal details
- Born: March 31, 1913 Rogersville, New Brunswick
- Died: January 30, 1964 (aged 50) Rogersville, New Brunswick
- Party: New Brunswick Liberal Association
- Spouse: Lucie
- Occupation: county councillor

William J. Gallant (March 31, 1913 – January 30, 1964) was a Canadian politician. He served in the Legislative Assembly of New Brunswick from 1952 to 1960 as member of the Liberal party.
