= Douglas Pettigrew =

Canadian politician

Member of the Legislative Assembly of New Brunswick
- In office 1952–1960
- Constituency: Restigouche

Personal details
- Born: December 16, 1917 Jacquet River, New Brunswick
- Died: October 18, 1973 (aged 55) New Brunswick
- Party: Progressive Conservative Party of New Brunswick
- Spouse: Ruth Clithero
- Children: 3
- Occupation: Politician & WW II Veteran Awarded the MC

Douglas Bonar Pettigrew (December 16, 1917 – October 18, 1973) was a Canadian politician. He served in the Legislative Assembly of New Brunswick as member of the Progressive Conservative party from 1952 to 1960.
