= J. Fraser Kerr =

Canadian politician (1904–1989)

Member of the Legislative Assembly of New Brunswick
- In office 1961–1970
- Constituency: Westmorland

Personal details
- Born: January 6, 1904 Chatham, New Brunswick
- Died: June 2, 1989 (aged 85) Chatham, New Brunswick
- Party: New Brunswick Liberal Association
- Spouse: Mary Genevieve Fitzgerald
- Children: 6

John Fraser Kerr (January 6, 1904 – June 2, 1989) was a Canadian politician. He served in the Legislative Assembly of New Brunswick from 1961 to 1970 as member of the Liberal party.
