= Paul Fearon =

Canadian politician

Member of the Legislative Assembly of New Brunswick
- In office 1952–1960
- Constituency: Sunbury

Personal details
- Born: July 4, 1904 Harcourt, New Brunswick
- Died: December 30, 1991 (aged 87) Mill Cove, New Brunswick
- Party: Progressive Conservative Party of New Brunswick
- Spouse: Mary Agnes Jewett
- Occupation: Accountant and Merchant

Paul Freeman Fearon (July 4, 1904 – December 30, 1991) was a Canadian politician. He served in the Legislative Assembly of New Brunswick as member of the Progressive Conservative party from 1952 to 1960.
