= J. Roger Pichette =

Canadian politician

- Born: August 14, 1921; Chandler, Quebec
- Died: November 21, 2002 (aged 81); Moncton, New Brunswick
- Resting place: Campbellton, New Brunswick
- Education: St.Hyacinthe Seminary (Québec)
- Occupations: Businessman, politician
- Political party: Progressive Conservative
- Spouse: Florence Marie Olscamp
- Children: Conrad R. (1944–2004); Murielle F. (b. 1946); Suzanne (b. 1951); Louise (b. 1958)
- Parent(s): Joseph-Eugene Pichette & Marie-Ange Rousseau

Joseph Roger Eugene Pichette (DFC) (August 14, 1921 – November 21, 2002) was a Canadian politician. Born in Chandler, Quebec, he attended school in Campbellton, New Brunswick where he lived for most of his life. He served with the Royal Canadian Air Force during World War II. He rose to the level of Flight Lieutenant and was awarded the Distinguished Flying Cross.

In 1943 Roger Pichette married Florence Olscamp (1923–2002) of Ste-Anne de Restigouche (Listuguj Mi'gmaq First Nation), Quebec. The couple had a son and three daughters.

Pichette was first elected to the Legislative Assembly of New Brunswick as the Progressive Conservative Party member for the Restigouche riding in the 1952 Provincial election. New premier Hugh John Flemming appointed him Minister of Industry and Development on October 8, 1952. Reelected in 1956, Pichette remained Minister until July 12, 1960 when his party was defeated in the 1960 New Brunswick general election.

In the 1979 Canadian federal election, Pichette was the unsuccessful Progressive Conservative Party of Canada's candidate in the federal riding of Restigouche.

Roger Pichette died in Moncton, New Brunswick in 2002 at age eighty-one. His wife died less than two months later. They are buried in Campbellton, New Brunswick.

1980 Canadian federal election: Restigouche
Party	Candidate	Votes	%	±%
Liberal	Maurice Harquail	16,560	61.3	+5.4
Progressive Conservative	D. Bennett MacDonald	5,119	18.9	-6.5
New Democratic Party	Aurele Ferlatte	4,457	16.5	-1.3
Rhinoceros	Arthur Doucet	692	2.6	+2.6
Independent	André Dumont	207	0.8	+0.8
Total		27,035		
lop.parl.ca

New Brunswick provincial government of Hugh John Flemming
Cabinet post (1)
Predecessor	Office	Successor
J. André Doucet	'Minister of Industry & Development'; 1952–1960	J. Michel Fournier
