= Fred Somers =

Canadian politician

Member of the Legislative Assembly of New Brunswick
- In office 1952–1960
- Constituency: Restigouche

Personal details
- Born: January 5, 1912 Drummond, New Brunswick
- Died: November 17, 1981 (aged 69) Sault Ste. Marie, Ontario
- Party: Progressive Conservative Party of New Brunswick
- Spouse: Sylvie Daigle
- Children: 9
- Occupation: lumber merchant

Fred Somers (January 5, 1912 – November 17, 1981) was a Canadian politician. He served in the Legislative Assembly of New Brunswick as member of the Progressive Conservative party from 1952 to 1960.
