= Jean-Pierre Ouellet =

Canadian politician

Member of the Legislative Assembly of New Brunswick for Madawaska-les-Lacs
- In office 1974–1987

New Brunswick Minister of Youth
- In office 1974–1982

New Brunswick Minister of Education
- In office 1985–1987

Progressive Conservative Candidate for Madawaska-Restigouche
- In office 2006–2006

Personal details
- Born: 21 August 1946 (age 79) Saint-Éleuthère, Quebec
- Party: Progressive Conservative
- Education: Université de Moncton

Jean-Pierre Ouellet (born August 21, 1946 in Saint-Éleuthère, Kamouraska County, Quebec) is a Canadian politician in the province of New Brunswick.

He is a three-term member of the Legislative Assembly of New Brunswick representing the riding of Madawaska-les-Lacs for the Progressive Conservative Party. He was a member of Premier Richard Hatfield's cabinet.

He served as Minister of Youth from 1974 to 1982 and as Minister of Education from 1985 to his defeat in the 1987 election which saw the Liberals take power.

Ouellet returned to politics as the Conservative Party of Canada candidate in the riding of Madawaska-Restigouche in the 2006 federal election but was defeated by incumbent Jean-Claude D'Amours in a close race.
