= J. Michel Fournier =

Canadian politician (1905–1992)

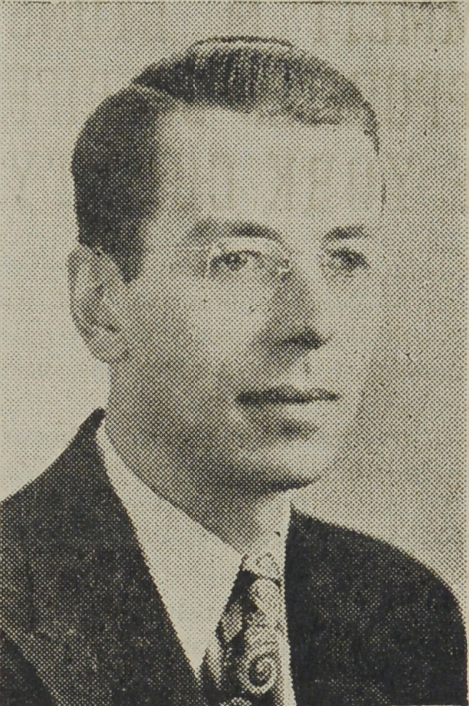
- Fournier in a 1947 newspaper
- Born: September 29, 1905; Pointe-Verte, New Brunswick; Canada
- Died: December 6, 1992 (aged 87); Canada
- Education: Tracadie Academy; St. Joseph's College
- Occupations: Farmer, politician
- Political party: Liberal
- Spouse(s): Clarisse Boudreau (1908–2008)
- Children: Gabrielle, Roger, Jocelyne (5 children)
- Parent(s): Théotime Fournier & Philomène Doucet

Joseph Michel Fournier (September 29, 1905 – December 6, 1992) was a Canadian politician. Born in the village of Pointe-Verte, New Brunswick, Michel Fournier was educated at the academy in Tracadie and graduated in 1927 with a BA degree from University of St. Joseph's College in Memramcook.

A farmer who was active in his industry, Michel Fournier was a director of the Green Point Co-Op. Involved in local politics, he served as a Gloucester County counsellor from 1935 to 1939.

== New Brunswick Legislative Assembly ==
Fournier was elected to the 40th New Brunswick Legislative Assembly as a Liberal candidate in the Gloucester riding in a by-election triggered when Clovis-Thomas Richard resigned to run in the 1945 Canadian federal election. He was reelected in 1948, 1952, 1956 and 1960. Following his party taking power in the 1960 New Brunswick general election, new Premier Louis Robichaud appointed Fournier to the Cabinet as Minister of Industry and Development on July 12, 1960. He served in that position until April 22, 1963.

New Brunswick provincial government of Louis Robichaud
Cabinet post (1)
| Predecessor | Office | Successor |
|---|---|---|
| J. Roger Pichette | 'Minister of Industry & Development'; 1963–1968 | Lestock G. DesBrisay |

== Senate of Canada ==
On December 9, 1971, Canadian Prime Minister Pierre Trudeau appointed Michel Fournier to the Senate of Canada where he was active on several committees including the Special Committee on Retirement Age Policies and the Standing Committee on Agriculture. He served in the Senate until his mandatory retirement at age seventy-five on September 29, 1980.
