= Jean-Paul LeBlanc (politician) =

Canadian politician (1923–2021)

Member of the Legislative Assembly of New Brunswick
- In office 1970–1974
- Constituency: Moncton

Personal details
- Born: Jean-Paul Fernand LeBlanc; August 16, 1923 College Bridge, New Brunswick
- Died: November 28, 2021 (aged 98) Moncton, New Brunswick
- Party: Progressive Conservative Party of New Brunswick
- Spouse(s): Isabel MacLellan, Placidie Robichaud
- Children: 8
- Education: St. Francis Xavier University
- Occupation: owner/manager, Moncton Plumbing & Supplies Ltd., politician, chairman - Civil Service Commission of New Brunswick

Jean-Paul LeBlanc (August 16, 1923 – November 28, 2021) was a Canadian politician. He served in the Legislative Assembly of New Brunswick from 1970 to 1974 from the electoral district of Moncton, a member of the Progressive Conservative party. LeBlanc died in Moncton, New Brunswick on November 28, 2021, at the age of 98.
