= C. Douglas Everett =

Canadian politician (1902–1982)

Charles Douglas Everett (June 14, 1902 – June 12, 1982) was an insurance agent and political figure in the province of New Brunswick, Canada. He represented Charlotte County in the Legislative Assembly of New Brunswick from 1952 to 1960 as a Progressive Conservative member. He ran unsuccessfully for a seat in the provincial assembly in 1944 (on his return from overseas military service), 1948 and 1949 before being elected in 1952.

Everett served as a captain in the 8th Canadian Hussars (Princess Louise's) Regiment in the Canadian Army during World War II, both overseas and in Canada.

Everett was born in Saint John, New Brunswick, the son of Charles Stewart Everett and Emily Olivia (née Smith) Everett. He was educated at McGill University in Montreal, graduating in 1925. In 1949, Everett married Mary Frances (Maureen) Toner, a nurse, whom he had met in England during World War II. Toner, originally from Ireland, was born in Mullynure, County Armagh, on May 28, 1919.
