= John F. McInerney =

Canadian politician

John Frederick McInerney (October 26, 1912 – October 25, 1967) was a physician and political figure in New Brunswick, Canada. He represented York County in the Legislative Assembly of New Brunswick as a Progressive Conservative member from 1952 to 1967.

He was born in Saint John, New Brunswick, the son of Frederick McInerney and Ethel Murphy. McInerney was educated at Saint Francis Xavier University and received an M.D. from McGill University in 1939. He set up practice in Fredericton. In 1942, he married Edith Vera Bedford. He served in the province's Executive Council as Minister of Health from 1952 to 1960. He was also the deputy premier of New Brunswick under Hugh John Fleming. And he was Doctor Chalmers partner in the starting the Polio Clinic & Health Center part of the Victoria Public Hospital in Fredericton. McInerney died suddenly in Fredericton the day before what would have been his 55th birthday.

New Brunswick provincial government of Hugh John Flemming
Cabinet post (1)
Predecessor	Office	Successor
Frederic McGrand	Minister of Health; 1952–1960	Georges Dumont
