= Richard J. Gill =

Canadian politician

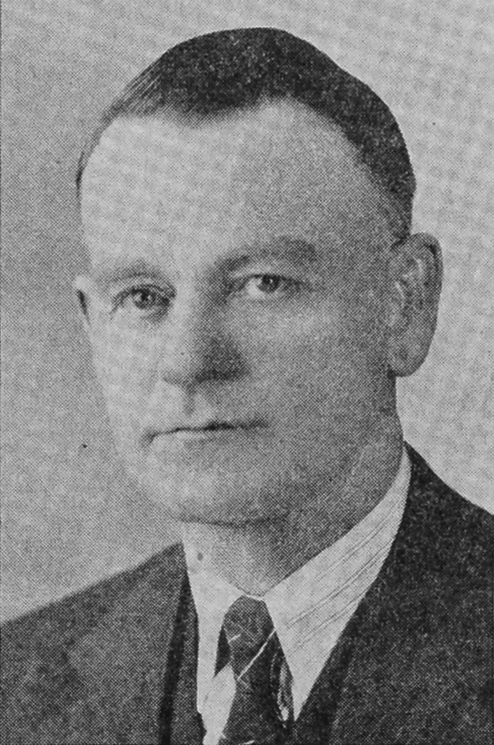
- Gill, pictured in a 1944 newspaper

Legislative Assembly of New Brunswick
- In office 1931 to 1959

Personal details
- Born: March 29, 1886 Canada
- Died: March 7, 1959 (aged 72) Canada
- Party: Liberal Party of New Brunswick

Richard Joseph Gill (March 29, 1886 – March 7, 1959) was a lumberman and political figure in New Brunswick. He represented Northumberland County in the Legislative Assembly of New Brunswick from 1931 to his death in 1959 as a Liberal member.

He was born in Barnaby River, New Brunswick, the son of Thomas Gill and Sarah Masterson. Gill was educated at St. Francis Xavier University. In 1920, he married Estelle C. Power. He served as county warden in 1923 and 1924. In 1946, he was named Minister of Lands and Mines in the administration of Premier John B. McNair, and served through 1952.

New Brunswick provincial government of John B. McNair
Cabinet post (1)
Predecessor	Office	Successor
John B. McNair	'Minister of Lands and Mines'; 1946-1952	Norman B. Buchanan
