= Joseph W. Bourgeois =

Canadian politician (1901–1977)

Member of the Legislative Assembly of New Brunswick
- In office 1952–1960
- Constituency: Moncton

Personal details
- Born: February 20, 1901 Moncton, New Brunswick
- Died: November 25, 1977 (aged 76) Moncton, New Brunswick
- Party: Progressive Conservative Party of New Brunswick
- Spouse: Edmée LeBlanc
- Occupation: merchant

Joseph Marcelin Wilfred Bourgeois (February 20, 1901 – November 25, 1977) was a Canadian politician. He served in the Legislative Assembly of New Brunswick as a member of the Progressive Conservative Party from 1952 to 1960. Bourgeois died at hospital in Moncton in 1977.
