= Graham Crocker =

Canadian politician

Member of the Legislative Assembly of New Brunswick
- In office 1960–1974
- Constituency: Northumberland

Personal details
- Born: October 4, 1912 Newcastle, New Brunswick
- Died: November 8, 1984 (aged 72) Miramichi, New Brunswick
- Party: New Brunswick Liberal Association
- Spouse: Muriel Cross
- Children: 2
- Occupation: businessman

Howard Graham Crocker (October 4, 1912 – November 8, 1984) was a Canadian politician. He served in the Legislative Assembly of New Brunswick from 1960 to 1974 as member of the Liberal party.
