= Norbert Thériault =

Canadian politician (1921–2016)

The Honourable L. Norbert Thériault

Senator for New Brunswick
- In office March 26, 1979 – February 16, 1996
- Appointed by: Pierre Trudeau

Member of the Legislative Assembly of New Brunswick
- In office 1960–1979

Personal details
- Born: February 16, 1921 Eel River Bridge, New Brunswick
- Died: June 19, 2016 (aged 95) Shediac, New Brunswick
- Party: New Brunswick Liberal Association

L. Norbert Thériault (February 16, 1921 – June 19, 2016) was a Canadian politician. He represented Northumberland (1960–1974) and Baie du Vin (1974–1979) in the Legislative Assembly of New Brunswick, and was a provincial cabinet minister in New Brunswick in the 1960s. He was appointed to the Senate of Canada on March 26, 1979 on the advice of then-Prime Minister Pierre Elliott Trudeau, and served until his 75th birthday on February 16, 1996. His son Camille Thériault also served a member of the Legislative Assembly of New Brunswick, and was premier of New Brunswick from May 14, 1998 until June 21, 1999.

== Life and career ==
Norbert Thériault was born in Eel River Bridge, located near Baie-Sainte-Anne in Northumberland County, New Brunswick. From 1948 to 1961, he worked as a school counselor. Thériault was first elected to the Legislative Assembly of New Brunswick in the 1960 general election, where he received the most votes for the riding of Northumberland.

Thériault died in Shediac on June 19, 2016, at the age of 95.

Preceded by Donald A. McLean; 1966-1971	New Brunswick Liberal Party President; 1971–1977	Succeeded by Peter Seheult; 1977-1979
