= 41st New Brunswick Legislature =

Former Address Legislative Assembly New Brunswick

The 41st New Brunswick Legislative Assembly represented New Brunswick between March 5, 1949, and July 16, 1952. The Legislature of 52 members was elected in 1948.

David Laurence MacLaren served as Lieutenant-Governor of New Brunswick.

Harry O. Downey was chosen as speaker.

The Liberal Party led by John B. McNair formed the government.

== Members ==
Electoral District	Name	Party	First elected / previously elected
Albert	Harry O. Downey	Liberal	1930
Albert	A. Russell Colpitts	Liberal	1939
Carleton	Hugh J. Flemming	Progressive Conservative	1944
Carleton	Gladstone W. Perry	Progressive Conservative	1930
Carleton	Jack Fraser	Liberal	1948
Charlotte	J.J. Hayes Doone	Liberal	1935
Charlotte	Leigh Williamson	Liberal	1948
Charlotte	Hugh S. Balkam	Liberal	1944
Charlotte	Owen Morse	Liberal	1944
Charlotte	William Neil Campbell (1950)	Liberal	1950
Gloucester	Frederick C. Young	Liberal	1944
Gloucester	Michel Fournier	Liberal	1945
Gloucester	J. André Doucet	Liberal	1923
Gloucester	Joseph E. Connolly	Liberal	1940
Gloucester	Ernest Richard	Liberal	1948
Kent	J. Killeen McKee	Liberal	1940
Kent	Isaie Melanson	Liberal	1939
Kent	Armand Richard	Liberal	1944
Kings	Elmore T. Kennedy	Progressive Conservative	1939
Kings	Hugh Mackay	Progressive Conservative	1939
Kings	John Woods	Progressive Conservative	1944
Madawaska	J. Gaspard Boucher	Liberal	1935
Madawaska	Clarence Bourque	Liberal	1948
Madawaska	Docithe Nadeau	Liberal	1948
Moncton	E. A. Fryers	Liberal	1948
Moncton	Claudius L. L. Léger	Liberal	1948
Northumberland	William S. Anderson	Liberal	1930
Northumberland	Richard J. Gill	Liberal	1930
Northumberland	H. S. Murray	Liberal	1944
Northumberland	Michel A. Savoie	Liberal	1948
Queens	Edward S. Darrah	Liberal	1944
Queens	H. C. Parker	Liberal	1944
Restigouche	Jean-Baptiste D'Astous	Liberal	1945
Restigouche	Edward Samuel Mooers	Liberal	1939
Restigouche	Louis LeBel	Liberal	1948
Saint John City	James W. Brittain	Liberal	1948
Saint John City	Harold Gault	Liberal	1948
Saint John City	S. Roy Kelly	Liberal	1948
Saint John City	Robert H. Carlin	Liberal	1948
Saint John County	Stephen D. Clark	Liberal	1948
Saint John County	Harold C. Atkinson	Liberal	1948
Sunbury	Gordon R. Lawson	Liberal	1944
Sunbury	F. A. McGrand	Liberal	1935
Victoria	Vernon R. Briggs	Liberal	1930
Victoria	Michael F. McCloskey	Liberal	1944
Westmorland	Austin C. Taylor	Liberal	1935
Westmorland	Frank H. Copp	Liberal	1935
Westmorland	Édouard S. Léger	Liberal	1939
Westmorland	L. C. Dysart	Liberal	1944
York	Harry A. Corey	Liberal	1944
York	Donald T. Cochrane	Liberal	1944
York	Henry C. Greenlaw	Liberal	1944
York	John B. McNair	Liberal	1935, 1940

Preceded by 40th New Brunswick Legislature	Legislative Assemblies of New Brunswick; 1948–1952	Succeeded by 42nd New Brunswick Legislature
