= 40th New Brunswick Legislature =

Canadian provincial legislative assembly

The 40th New Brunswick Legislative Assembly represented New Brunswick between February 20, 1945, and May 8, 1948. It was elected in the 1944 New Brunswick general election and subsequent by-elections.

William George Clark served as Lieutenant-Governor of New Brunswick in 1945. He was succeeded by David Laurence MacLaren in November of that year.

Harry O. Downey was chosen as speaker.

The Liberal Party led by John B. McNair formed the government.

== Members ==
Electoral District	Name	Party	First elected / previously elected
Albert	Harry O. Downey	Liberal	1930
Albert	A. Russell Colpitts	Liberal	1939
Carleton	Hugh J. Flemming	Progressive Conservative	1944
Carleton	Gladstone W. Perry	Progressive Conservative	1930
Carleton	Fred C. Squires	Progressive Conservative	1925
Charlotte	J.J. Hayes Doone	Liberal	1935
Charlotte	R. Fraser Keay	Liberal	1935
Charlotte	Hugh S. Balkam	Liberal	1944
Charlotte	Owen Morse	Liberal	1944
Gloucester	Frederick C. Young	Liberal	1944
Gloucester	Clovis T. Richard (Note: elected to federal seat)	Liberal	1926
Gloucester	J. André Doucet	Liberal	1923
Gloucester	Joseph E. Connolly	Liberal	1940
Gloucester	Michel Fournier (1945)	Liberal	1945
Kent	J. Killeen McKee	Liberal	1940
Kent	Isaie Melanson	Liberal	1939
Kent	Armand Richard	Liberal	1944
Kings	Elmore T. Kennedy	Progressive Conservative	1939
Kings	Hugh Mackay	Progressive Conservative	1939
Kings	John Woods	Progressive Conservative	1944
Madawaska	J. Gaspard Boucher	Liberal	1935
Madawaska	J. Hervé Proulx	Liberal	1944
Moncton	Charles H. Blakeney	Liberal	1935
Northumberland	William S. Anderson	Liberal	1930
Northumberland	Richard J. Gill	Liberal	1930
Northumberland	H. S. Murray	Liberal	1944
Northumberland	Hidulphe A. Savoie	Liberal	1930
Queens	Edward S. Darrah	Liberal	1944
Queens	H. C. Parker	Liberal	1944
Restigouche	Benoît Michaud	Liberal	1944
Restigouche	Edward Samuel Mooers	Liberal	1939
Restigouche	Jean-Baptiste D'Astous (1945)	Liberal	1945
Saint John City	Laurance T. Dow	Progressive Conservative	1944
Saint John City	Ralph G. McInerney	Progressive Conservative	1939
Saint John City	W. Grant Smith	Progressive Conservative	1939
Saint John City	J. Starr Tait	Progressive Conservative	1939
Saint John County	Robert McAllister	Progressive Conservative	1931
Saint John County	Alphonso C. Smith (Note: died)	Progressive Conservative	1935
Saint John County	Edward C. Seeley (1945)	Independent	1945
Sunbury	Gordon R. Lawson	Liberal	1944
Sunbury	F. A. McGrand	Liberal	1935
Victoria	Frederick W. Pirie (Note: named to Senate)	Liberal	1930
Victoria	Michael F. McCluskey	Liberal	1944
Victoria	Vernon R. Briggs (1945)	Liberal	1945
Westmorland	Austin C. Taylor	Liberal	1935
Westmorland	Frank H. Copp	Liberal	1935
Westmorland	Édouard S. Léger	Liberal	1939
Westmorland	L. C. Dysart	Liberal	1944
York	Harry A. Corey	Liberal	1944
York	Donald T. Cochrane	Liberal	1944
York	Harry C. Greenlaw	Liberal	1944
York	John B. McNair	Liberal	1935, 1940

== Notes ==
Preceded by 39th New Brunswick Legislature	Legislative Assemblies of New Brunswick; 1944–1948	Succeeded by 41st New Brunswick Legislature
