= 23rd New Brunswick Legislature =

The 23rd New Brunswick Legislative Assembly represented New Brunswick between February 18, 1875, and May 14, 1878.

Samuel Leonard Tilley served as Lieutenant-Governor of New Brunswick.

William Wedderburn was chosen as speaker.

The Conservative Party led by George E. King formed the government.

In 1876, an informal accommodation was reached with Roman Catholics in the province with respect to religious instruction in schools. Where the arrangement was agreeable to the local school board, religious instruction could be carried out in buildings owned by the Church and rented to the province for use as public schools.

== Members ==
Electoral District	Name	Party	First elected / previously elected
Albert	Alexander Rogers	Liberal	1874
Albert	James Ryan	Liberal	1870
Carleton	John S. Leighton	Liberal	1874
Carleton	Randolph K. Jones	Independent	1874
Charlotte	James Murchie	Liberal	1874
Charlotte	Benjamin Robert Stephenson	Liberal	1867
Charlotte	James McKay	Liberal	1874
Charlotte	Thomas Cottrell	Liberal	1874
Gloucester	Kennedy F. Burns	Liberal	1874
Gloucester	T. Blanchard (Note: resigned to accept appointment)	Conservative	1870
Gloucester	Patrick G. Ryan (1876)	Liberal	1876
Kent	Henry O'Leary	Independent	1873
Kent	Urbain Johnson	Liberal	1869, 1874
Kings	John Herbert Crawford	Liberal	1870
Kings	John Flewelling	Independent	1866, 1874
Kings	Robert E. McLeod	Independent	1874
Madawaska	Lévite Thériault	Liberal	1868
Northumberland	W.M. Kelly	Independent	1867
Northumberland	William Swim	Independent	1874
Northumberland	Lemuel J. Tweedie	Liberal	1874
Northumberland	Allan A. Davidson	Conservative	1874
Queens	Walter S. Butler	Independent	1867, 1872
Queens	Francis Woods	Liberal	1874
Restigouche	Archibald McKenzie	Independent	1874
Restigouche	John Phillips	Liberal	1870
Saint John City	William Wedderburn	Independent	1870
Saint John City	William H.A. Keans (Note: died in 1876)	Independent	1867, 1874
Saint John City	Robert Marshall (1876)	Liberal	1876
Saint John County	Henry A. Austin	Independent	1874
Saint John County	George E. King	Conservative	1867
Saint John County	Joseph Coram (Note: died in 1875)	Independent	1867
Saint John County	Edward Willis	Independent	1870
Saint John County	William Elder (1875)	Independent	1875
Sunbury	William E. Perley	Conservative	1856, 1874
Sunbury	John S. Covert	Liberal	1868
Victoria	William B. Beveridge	Conservative	1874
Westmorland	Edward J. Smith	Liberal	1874
Westmorland	Angus McQueen	Independent	1866
Westmorland	J.A. Humphrey	Conservative	1872
Westmorland	Thomas Pickard	Liberal	1874
York	J.J. Fraser	Conservative	1865, 1872
York	Thomas F. Barker	Conservative	1874
York	Robert Robinson	Independent	1870
York	Hiram Dow	Independent	1861, 1866, 1874

== Notes ==
Preceded by 22nd New Brunswick Legislature	Legislative Assemblies of New Brunswick; 1875–1878	Succeeded by 24th New Brunswick Legislature
