= Charlotte (provincial electoral district, 1785–1974) =

Defunct provincial electoral district in New Brunswick, Canada

New Brunswick electoral district

Defunct provincial electoral district
- Legislature: Legislative Assembly of New Brunswick
- District created: 1785
- District abolished: 1973
- First contested: 1785
- Last contested: 1970

Charlotte was a provincial electoral district in New Brunswick, Canada. It existed from the first legislature in 1785 until it was abolished in 1973 when New Brunswick went from bloc voting to single-member ridings. The riding of St. Stephen-Milltown was briefly separated from this riding between 1924 and 1926.

== Members of the Legislative Assembly ==
| Legislature | Years | Member | Party | Member | Party | Member | Party | Member | Party |
|---|---|---|---|---|---|---|---|---|---|
| 1st | 1786 – 1792 | William Payne | Ind. | James Campbell | Ind. | Robert Pagan | Ind. | Peter Clinch | Ind. |
| 2nd | 1793 – 1795 | Daniel McMaster | Ind. | Hugh Mackay | Ind. | Robert Pagan | Ind. | Peter Clinch | Ind. |
| 3rd | 1795 – 1802 | James Campbell | Ind. | David Owen | Ind. | Robert Pagan | Ind. | David Mowatt | Ind. |
| 4th | 1802 – 1809 | Ninian Lindsay | Ind. | Hugh Mackay | Ind. | Robert Pagan | Ind. | Joseph Porter | Ind. |
| 5th | 1809 – 1816 | John Dunn | Ind. | Donald McDonald | Ind. | Robert Pagan | Ind. | Colin Campbell | Ind. |
| 6th | 1817 – 1819 | Hugh Mackay | Ind. | Joseph Porter | Ind. | Robert Pagan | Ind. | Colin Campbell | Ind. |
| 7th | 1820 | Hugh Mackay | Ind. | Joseph Porter | Ind. | John Campbell | Ind. | Colin Campbell | Ind. |
| 8th | 1821 – 1827 | Hugh Mackay | Ind. | Peter Stubs | Ind. | John Campbell | Ind. | Joseph N. Clarke | Ind. |
| 9th | 1827 – 1828 | Hugh Mackay | Ind. | Colin Campbell | Ind. | Thomas Wyer | Ind. | Joseph N. Clarke | Ind. |
| 9th | 1828 – 1829 | Hugh Mackay | Ind. | Colin Campbell | Ind. | Thomas Wyer | Ind. | Patrick Clinch | Ind. |
| 9th | 1829 – 1830 | Hugh Mackay | Ind. | Colin Campbell | Ind. | Thomas Wyer | Ind. | Joseph N. Clarke | Ind. |
| 10th | 1831 – 1834 | James Brown | Ind. | Patrick Clinch | Ind. | Thomas Wyer | Ind. | George S. Hill | Ind. |
| 11th | 1835 – 1837 | James Brown | Ind. | Patrick Clinch | Ind. | Thomas Wyer | Ind. | George S. Hill | Ind. |
| 12th | 1837 – 1842 | James Brown | Ind. | Robert Thomson | Ind. | Thomas Wyer | Ind. | George S. Hill | Ind. |
| 13th | 1843 – 1846 | James Brown | Ind. | Robert Thomson | Ind. | James Boyd | Ind. | George S. Hill | Ind. |
| 14th | 1847 – 1850 | James Brown | Ind. | Robert Thomson | Ind. | James Boyd | Ind. | William Porter | Ind. |
| 15th | 1851 – 1854 | John James Robinson | Ind. | Robert Thomson | Ind. | Bartholomew R. Fitzgerald | Ind. | William Porter | Ind. |
| 16th | 1854 – 1856 | Arthur Hill Gillmor | Lib. | John McAdam | Lib.-Con. | James Boyd | Ind. | James Brown | Ind. |
| 17th | 1856 – 1857 | Arthur Hill Gillmor | Lib. | John McAdam | Lib.-Con. | James Boyd | Ind. | George Dixon Street | Ind. |
| 18th | 1857 – 1861 | Arthur Hill Gillmor | Lib. | John McAdam | Lib.-Con. | James Brown | Ind. | James W. Chandler | Ind. |
| 19th | 1862 – 1864 | Arthur Hill Gillmor | Lib. | George S. Grimmer | Lib. | James Boyd | Ind. | James G. Stevens | Ind. |
| 19th | 1864 – 1865 | Arthur Hill Gillmor | Lib. | John McAdam | Lib.-Con. | James Boyd | Ind. | James G. Stevens | Ind. |
| 20th | 1865 – 1866 | Arthur Hill Gillmor | Lib. | George F. Hill | Lib. | James Boyd | Ind. | Robert Thomson | Ind. |
| 21st | 1866 – 1867 | John McAdam | Lib.-Con. | James G. Stevens | Ind. | Francis Hibbard | Ind. | James W. Chandler | Ind. |
| 21st | 1867 – 1870 | John McAdam | Lib.-Con. | Henry Frye | Ind. | Francis Hibbard | Ind. | Benjamin Robert Stephenson | Lib. |
| 22nd | 1870 – 1872 | John McAdam | Lib.-Con. | Joseph Donald | Ind. | Francis Hibbard | Ind. | Benjamin Robert Stephenson | Lib. |
| 22nd | 1872 – 1874 | John Cameron Brown | Lib. | Joseph Donald | Ind. | Francis Hibbard | Ind. | Benjamin Robert Stephenson | Lib. |
| 23rd | 1875 – 1878 | James Murchie | Lib. | James McKay | Lib. | Thomas Cottrell | Lib. | Benjamin Robert Stephenson | Lib. |
| 24th | 1879 – 1882 | George F. Hill | Lib. | James E. Lynott | Ind. | Thomas Cottrell | Lib. | Benjamin Robert Stephenson | Lib. |
| 25th | 1883 – 1886 | John McAdam | Lib.-Con. | James E. Lynott | Ind. | James Mitchell | Lib. | George F. Hibbard | Ind. |
| 26th | 1886 – 1890 | William Douglas | Cons. | James Russell | Ind. | James Mitchell | Lib. | George F. Hibbard | Ind. |
| 27th | 1890 – 1892 | William Douglas | Cons. | James Russell | Ind. | James Mitchell | Lib. | George F. Hibbard | Ind. |
| 28th | 1892 – 1895 | George F. Hill | Lib. | James Russell | Ind. | James Mitchell | Lib. | James O'Brien | Lib. |
| 29th | 1896 – 1899 | George F. Hill | Lib. | James Russell | Ind. | James Mitchell | Lib. | James O'Brien | Lib. |
| 30th | 1899 – 1903 | George F. Hill | Lib. | James Russell | Ind. | William F. Todd | Lib. | James O'Brien | Lib. |
| 31st | 1903 – 1908 | Henry I. Taylor | Cons. | Thomas A. Hartt | Cons. | Ward C.H. Grimmer | Cons. | George J. Clarke | Cons. |
| 32nd | 1908 – 1912 | Henry I. Taylor | Cons. | Thomas A. Hartt | Cons. | Ward C.H. Grimmer | Cons. | George J. Clarke | Cons. |
| 33rd | 1912 – 1917 | Henry I. Taylor | Cons. | Scott D. Guptill | Cons. | Ward C.H. Grimmer | Cons. | George J. Clarke | Cons. |
| 34th | 1917 – 1920 | Henry I. Taylor | Cons. | Scott D. Guptill | Cons. | R. Watson Grimmer | Cons. | Harry D. Smith | Cons. |
| 35th | 1921 – 1925 | Henry I. Taylor | Cons. | Scott D. Guptill | Cons. | John M. Flewelling | Cons. | John W. Scovil | Lib. |
| 36th | 1925 – 1930 | Henry I. Taylor | Cons. | Scott D. Guptill | Cons. | James S. Lord | Cons. | see St. Stephen-Milltown | |
| 37th | 1931 – 1935 | Henry I. Taylor | Cons. | Scott D. Guptill | Cons. | George H. I. Cockburn | Cons. | Harry Marshall Groom | Cons. |
| 38th | 1935 – 1939 | Alexander Dyas | Lib. | J.J. Hayes Doone | Lib. | R. Fraser Keay | Lib. | Foster Calder | Lib. |
| 39th | 1939 – 1944 | Alexander Dyas | Lib. | J.J. Hayes Doone | Lib. | R. Fraser Keay | Lib. | Foster Calder | Lib. |
| 40th | 1944 – 1948 | Hugh S. Balkam | Lib. | J.J. Hayes Doone | Lib. | R. Fraser Keay | Lib. | Owen Morse | Lib. |
| 41st | 1948 – 1952 | Hugh S. Balkam | Lib. | William N. Campbell | Lib. | Leigh Williamson | Lib. | Owen Morse | Lib. |
| 42nd | 1952 – 1956 | Norman Buchanan | PC | C. Douglas Everett | PC | Lorne B. Groom | PC | Vance R. Huntley | PC |
| 43rd | 1957 – 1960 | Norman Buchanan | PC | C. Douglas Everett | PC | Lorne B. Groom | PC | Gale S. McLaughlin | PC |
| 44th | 1960 – 1963 | Kenneth J. Webber | Lib. | Henry G. Irwin | Lib. | Leon G. Small | Lib. | Alfred Hawkins | Lib. |
| 45th | 1963 – 1967 | Kenneth J. Webber | Lib. | Henry G. Irwin | Lib. | Leon G. Small | Lib. | Alfred Hawkins | Lib. |
| 46th | 1967 – 1970 | John E. Rigby | PC | G.W.N. Cockburn | PC | Leland McGaw | PC | DeCosta Young | PC |
| 47th | 1970 – 1972 | John E. Rigby | PC | G.W.N. Cockburn | PC | Leland McGaw | PC | DeCosta Young | PC |
| 47th | 1973 – 1974 | James N. Tucker, Jr. | PC | G.W.N. Cockburn | PC | Leland McGaw | PC | DeCosta Young | PC |
Riding dissolved into Charlotte Centre, Charlotte-Fundy, Charlotte West and St. Stephen-Milltown

== Election results ==
New Brunswick provincial by-election, 11 December 1972
| Party | Candidate | Votes | Elected |
|---|---|---|---|
| Progressive Conservative | James Tucker | 5,037 | ✓ |
| Liberal | Robert Brown | 4,202 | |

1970 New Brunswick general election
| Party | Candidate | Votes | Elected |
|---|---|---|---|
| Progressive Conservative | G.W.N. Cockburn | 6,047 | ✓ |
| Progressive Conservative | John E. Rigby | 6,028 | ✓ |
| Progressive Conservative | Leland McGaw | 5,816 | ✓ |
| Progressive Conservative | DeCosta W. Young | 5,785 | ✓ |
| Liberal | Robert W. Brown | 4,638 | |
| Liberal | Bernard Moses | 4,585 | |
| Liberal | E. B. "Bill" Ross | 4,484 | |
| Liberal | Douglas Wooster | 4,290 | |
| New Democratic | Robert Michael Modding | 218 | |

1967 New Brunswick general election
| Party | Candidate | Votes | Elected |
|---|---|---|---|
| Progressive Conservative | John E. Rigby | 5,835 | ✓ |
| Progressive Conservative | G.W.N. Cockburn | 5,744 | ✓ |
| Progressive Conservative | Leland McGaw | 5,639 | ✓ |
| Progressive Conservative | DeCosta W. Young | 5,587 | ✓ |
| Liberal | Arthur Giddins | 5,357 | |
| Liberal | Alfred Hawkins | 5,329 | |
| Liberal | Kenneth Webber | 5,298 | |
| Liberal | Fulton Winchester | 5,181 | |

== See also ==
- List of New Brunswick provincial electoral districts
- Canadian provincial electoral districts
