= Madawaska (provincial electoral district) =

Defunct provincial electoral district in New Brunswick, Canada

New Brunswick electoral district

Defunct provincial electoral district
- Legislature: Legislative Assembly of New Brunswick
- District created: 1874
- District abolished: 1973
- First contested: 1874
- Last contested: 1970

Madawaska was a provincial electoral district for the Legislative Assembly of New Brunswick, Canada. It was created from Victoria in 1874, and used a bloc voting system to elect candidates. It was abolished with the 1973 electoral redistribution, when the province moved to single-member ridings.

== Members of the Legislative Assembly ==
Legislature	Years	Member	Party	Member	Party	Member	Party
Riding created from Victoria
23rd	1875 – 1878	Lévite Thériault	Ind.				
24th	1879 – 1882	Lévite Thériault	Ind.				
25th	1882	P. Lynott	Ind.				
25th	1882 – 1886	Mathias Nadeau	Cons.				
26th	1886 – 1890	Lévite Thériault	Ind.				
27th	1890 – 1892	Lévite Thériault	Ind.				
28th	1892 – 1895	Lévite Thériault	Ind.				
29th	1896 – 1899	Alphonse Bertrand	Cons.	Cyprien Martin	Lib.		
30th	1899 – 1903	Frederick LaForest	Ind.	Narcisse A. Gagnon	Ind.		
31st	1903	Thomas Clair	Lib.	Narcisse A. Gagnon	Ind.		
31st	1903 – 1908	Thomas Clair	Lib.	Cyprien Martin	Lib.		
32nd	1908 – 1912	Charles L. Cyr	Ind.	Jesse W. Baker	Ind.		
33rd	1912 – 1917	Louis-Auguste Dugal	Lib.	Joseph H. Pelletier	Ind.		
34th	1917 – 1920	Louis-Auguste Dugal	Lib.	Joseph-Enoil Michaud	Lib.		
35th	1921 – 1922	Donat L. Daigle	Ind.	Joseph-Enoil Michaud	Lib.		
35th	1922 – 1925	Lorne J. Violette	Lib.	Joseph-Enoil Michaud	Lib.		
36th	1925 – 1930	Lorne J. Violette	Lib.	Joseph-Enoil Michaud	Lib.		
37th	1931 – 1935	Lorne J. Violette	Lib.	Joseph-Enoil Michaud	Lib.		
38th	1935 – 1939	Joseph Gaspard Boucher	Lib.	Pio Laporte	Lib.		
39th	1939 – 1944	Joseph Gaspard Boucher	Lib.				
40th	1944 – 1948	Joseph Gaspard Boucher	Lib.	J. Hervé Proulx	Lib.		
41st	1948 – 1952	Joseph Gaspard Boucher	Lib.	Clarence Bourque	Lib.	Docithe Nadeau	Lib.
42nd	1952 – 1956	William Bird	PC	Lucien Fortin	PC	Edgar Fournier	PC
43rd	1957 – 1960	William Bird	PC	Lucien Fortin	PC	Edgar Fournier	PC
44th	1960 – 1963	Laurier Lévesque	Lib.	J. Adrien Lévesque	Lib.	Jean Marc Michaud	Lib.
45th	1963 – 1967	Laurier Lévesque	Lib.	J. Adrien Lévesque	Lib.	Fred E. Soucy	Lib.
46th	1967 – 1970	Laurier Lévesque	Lib.	J. Adrien Lévesque	Lib.	Gérald Clavette	Lib.
47th	1970 – 1974	Laurier Lévesque	Lib.	Daniel G. Daigle	Lib.	Gérald Clavette	Lib.
Riding dissolved into Madawaska Centre, Madawaska-les-Lacs and Madawaska South

== Election results ==
1970 New Brunswick general election
Party	Candidate	Votes	Elected
Liberal	Gérald Clavette	4,766	✓
Liberal	Laurier Lévesque	4,696	✓
Liberal	Daniel Daigle	4,670	✓
Progressive Conservative	Guy Charest	3,304	
Progressive Conservative	Guildard A. Pelletier	3,195	
Progressive Conservative	Renaud Gagné	3,125	

1967 New Brunswick general election
Party	Candidate	Votes	Elected
Liberal	Gérald Clavette	4,303	✓
Liberal	J. Adrien Lévesque	4,235	✓
Liberal	Laurier Lévesque	4,187	✓
Progressive Conservative	Guy Charest	3,679	
Progressive Conservative	Noe Lévesque	3,574	
Progressive Conservative	Everard Tardif	3,548	

New Brunswick provincial by-election, 9 October 1882
Party	Candidate	Votes	Elected
Conservative	Mathias Nadeau	accl.	✓

1882 New Brunswick general election
Party	Candidate	Votes	Elected
Independent	Patrick Lynott	343	✓
Liberal	Lévite Thériault	342	
Conservative	Mathias Nadeau	294	

1878 New Brunswick general election
Party	Candidate	Votes	Elected
Liberal	Lévite Thériault	accl.	✓

1874 New Brunswick general election
Party	Candidate	Votes	Elected
Liberal	Lévite Thériault	475	✓
Independent	John Lynch	210	
Independent	Prudent A. Babin	ret.	

== See also ==
- List of New Brunswick provincial electoral districts
- Canadian provincial electoral districts
