= Wilfred Bishop =

Canadian politician

MLA for Queens
- In office 1952–1974 Serving with J. Arthur Moore (1952–1967), Robert McCready (1967–1974)
- Preceded by: Edward Darrah, H. C. Parker
- Succeeded by: riding dissolved

MLA for Queens North
- In office 1974–1987
- Preceded by: first member
- Succeeded by: Doug Tyler

Personal details
- Born: 1917 Chipman, New Brunswick, New Brunswick, Canada
- Died: March 1, 2004 (aged 86–87)
- Party: Progressive Conservative Party of New Brunswick

Wilfred Bishop (1917 – March 1, 2004) was a Canadian politician, who was a Progressive Conservative member of the Legislative Assembly of New Brunswick from 1952 to 1987. He is the longest-serving MLA in the history of the body.

Originally from Chipman, New Brunswick, Bishop ran a logging and sawmill business in Queens County prior to his election to the legislature.

He served in the Executive Council of New Brunswick as Minister of Natural Resources, Minister of Transportation and President of the Executive Council in the government of Richard Hatfield. Following the 1987 provincial election, in which the opposition Liberals won every seat in the legislature and left the Conservatives seatless, Bishop was a candidate for the interim leadership of the party, but lost to Malcolm MacLeod.
