= Kenneth J. Webber =

Canadian politician

Member of the Legislative Assembly of New Brunswick
- In office 1960–1967 Serving with Alfred Hawkins, Leon G. Small, Henry G. Irwin
- Constituency: Charlotte

Personal details
- Born: March 2, 1899 St. Stephen, New Brunswick
- Died: April 9, 1983 (aged 84) St. Stephen, New Brunswick
- Party: New Brunswick Liberal Association
- Occupation: Customs officer

Kenneth Jack Webber (March 2, 1899 – April 9, 1983) was a civil servant and political figure in New Brunswick, Canada. A Liberal Party member, he represented Charlotte County in the Legislative Assembly of New Brunswick from 1960 to 1967.

He was born in St. Stephen, New Brunswick, the son of John D. Webber and Emma Jacobs. In 1919, Webber married Edna Frances Hartin. He was a customs officer for Saint Stephen from 1923 to 1960. Webber served in the Canadian Army during World War II. He was Minister of Labour in the province's Executive Council from 1960 to 1967. Webber ran unsuccessfully for reelection in 1967. He died in 1983.

New Brunswick provincial government of Louis Robichaud
Cabinet post (1)
Predecessor	Office	Successor
Arthur Skaling	'Minister of Labour'; 1960–1967	H. H. Williamson
