= Queens (New Brunswick provincial electoral district) =

Defunct provincial electoral district in New Brunswick, Canada

New Brunswick electoral district

Defunct provincial electoral district
- Legislature: Legislative Assembly of New Brunswick
- District created: 1785
- District abolished: 1973
- First contested: 1785
- Last contested: 1970

Queens was a provincial electoral district for the Legislative Assembly of New Brunswick, Canada. It used a bloc voting system to elect candidates. It was abolished with the 1973 electoral redistribution, when the province moved to single-member ridings.

== Members of the Legislative Assembly ==
Legislature	Years	Member	Party	Member	Party
1st	1786 – 1792	Samuel Dickinson	Independent	John Yeamans	Independent
2nd	1793 – 1795	James Peters	Independent	John Yeamans	Independent
3rd	1795 – 1802	James Peters	Independent	John Yeamans	Independent
4th	1802 – 1809	James Peters	Independent	John Yeamans	Independent
5th	1809 – 1816	James Peters	Independent	John Yeamans	Independent
6th	1817 – 1819	Samuel Scovil	Independent	Richard Yeamans	Independent
7th	1820	Samuel Scovil	Independent	Richard Yeamans	Independent
8th	1821 – 1827	Samuel Scovil	Independent	William Peters	Independent
9th	1827 – 1830	Harry Peters	Independent	Charles Harrison	Independent
10th	1831 – 1834	Thomas Gilbert	Independent	Charles Harrison	Independent
11th	1835 – 1837	Thomas Gilbert	Independent	Hugh Johnston, Jr.	Independent
12th	1837 – 1842	Thomas Gilbert	Independent	Hugh Johnston, Jr.	Independent
13th	1843 – 1846	Thomas Gilbert	Independent	John Earle	Independent
14th	1847 – 1850	Thomas Gilbert	Independent	Hugh Johnston, Jr.	Independent
15th	1851 – 1854	Thomas Gilbert	Independent	John Earle	Independent
16th	1854 – 1856	Samuel H. Gilbert	Independent	John Ferris	Liberal
17th	1856 – 1857	John Earle	Independent	John Ferris	Liberal
18th	1857 – 1861	Samuel H. Gilbert	Independent	John Ferris	Liberal
19th	1862 – 1865	Samuel H. Gilbert	Independent	John Ferris	Liberal
20th	1865 – 1866	Joseph B. Perkins	Independent	Gideon D. Bailey	Independent
21st	1866 – 1867	John Ferris	Liberal	Robert Thorne Babbit	Independent
21st	1867 – 1870	Walter S. Butler	Independent	Robert Thorne Babbit	Independent
22nd	1870 – 1871	Gideon D. Bailey	Independent	Robert Thorne Babbit	Independent
22nd	1871 – 1872	Gideon D. Bailey	Independent	Ebenezer Williams	Independent
22nd	1872 – 1874	Walter S. Butler	Independent	Ebenezer Williams	Independent
23rd	1875 – 1878	Walter S. Butler	Independent	Francis Woods	Liberal
24th	1879 – 1882	Walter S. Butler	Independent	Francis Woods	Liberal
25th	1883 – 1886	Thomas Hetherington	Liberal	Albert Palmer	Liberal
26th	1886 – 1890	Thomas Hetherington	Liberal	Albert Palmer	Liberal
27th	1890 – 1892	Thomas Hetherington	Liberal	Albert Palmer	Liberal
28th	1892	Thomas Hetherington	Liberal	Laughlin Farris	Liberal
28th	1892 – 1895	Andrew George Blair	Liberal	Laughlin Farris	Liberal
29th	1896	Andrew George Blair	Liberal	Laughlin Farris	Liberal
29th	1896 – 1899	Isaac W. Carpenter	Independent	Laughlin Farris	Liberal
30th	1899 – 1903	Isaac W. Carpenter	Independent	Laughlin Farris	Liberal
31st	1903 – 1908	Isaac W. Carpenter	Independent	Laughlin Farris	Liberal
32nd	1908 – 1912	Harry W. Woods	Independent	Arthur R. Slipp	Independent
33rd	1912 – 1917	Harry W. Woods	Independent	Arthur R. Slipp	Independent
34th	1917 – 1920	George Herbert King	Liberal	Judson Hetherington	Liberal
35th	1921 – 1925	George Herbert King	Liberal	Judson Hetherington	Liberal
36th	1925 – 1930	W. Benton Evans	Conservative	J. Arthur Moore	Conservative
37th	1931 – 1935	W. Benton Evans	Conservative	J. Arthur Moore	Conservative
38th	1935 – 1939	Frederic McGrand	Liberal	W. M. Jenkins	Liberal
39th	1939 – 1944	W. Benton Evans	Conservative	J. Arthur Moore	Conservative
40th	1944 – 1948	Edward S. Darrah	Liberal	Hardie C. Parker	Liberal
41st	1948 – 1952	Edward S. Darrah	Liberal	Hardie C. Parker	Liberal
42nd	1952 – 1956	Wilfred Bishop	Progressive Conservative	J. Arthur Moore	Progressive Conservative
43rd	1957 – 1960	Wilfred Bishop	Progressive Conservative	J. Arthur Moore	Progressive Conservative
44th	1960 – 1963	Wilfred Bishop	Progressive Conservative	J. Arthur Moore	Progressive Conservative
45th	1963 – 1967	Wilfred Bishop	Progressive Conservative	J. Arthur Moore	Progressive Conservative
46th	1967 – 1970	Wilfred Bishop	Progressive Conservative	Robert McCready	Liberal
47th	1970 – 1974	Wilfred Bishop	Progressive Conservative	Robert McCready	Liberal
Riding dissolved into Queens North and Queens South

== Election results ==
1970 New Brunswick general election
Party	Candidate	Votes	Elected
Progressive Conservative	Wilfred Bishop	2,609	✓
Liberal	Robert M. McCready	2,439	✓
Progressive Conservative	Lloyd Nickerson	2,367	
Liberal	Victor C. McMann	1,968	
New Democratic	William Arthur Bradley	128	

1967 New Brunswick general election
Party	Candidate	Votes	Elected
Progressive Conservative	Wilfred Bishop	2,613	✓
Liberal	Robert McCready	2,511	✓
Progressive Conservative	J. Arthur Moore	2,388	
Liberal	Otty Swift	2,248	

== See also ==
- List of New Brunswick provincial electoral districts
- Canadian provincial electoral districts
