= John W. Scovil =

Canadian politician

Member of the Legislative Assembly of New Brunswick
- In office 1921–1925 Serving with Henry I. Taylor, Scott D. Guptill, John M. Flewelling
- Constituency: Charlotte

Personal details
- Born: January 11, 1869 Shediac, New Brunswick
- Died: May 20, 1953 (aged 84) St. Stephen, New Brunswick
- Party: New Brunswick Liberal Association
- Spouse: Lina L. Marker (m. 1896)
- Children: two
- Occupation: merchant

John Walker Scovil (January 11, 1869 – May 20, 1953) was a Canadian politician. He served in the Legislative Assembly of New Brunswick from 1921 to 1925 as member of the Liberal party. He died in 1953, aged 84.
