= 3rd New Brunswick general election =

The 3rd New Brunswick general election may refer to:

- 1795 New Brunswick general election, the 3rd general election to take place in the Colony of New Brunswick, for the 3rd New Brunswick Legislative Assembly
- 1874 New Brunswick general election, the 23rd overall general election for New Brunswick, for the 23rd New Brunswick Legislative Assembly, but considered the 3rd general election for the Canadian province of New Brunswick
