= 23rd New Brunswick general election =

The 23rd New Brunswick general election may refer to

- the 1874 New Brunswick general election, the 23rd overall general election for New Brunswick, for the 23rd New Brunswick Legislative Assembly, but considered the 3rd general election for the Canadian province of New Brunswick, or
- the 1956 New Brunswick general election, the 43rd overall general election for New Brunswick, for the 43rd New Brunswick Legislative Assembly, but considered the 23rd general election for the Canadian province of New Brunswick.
