= Murchie =

Murchie is a surname. Notable people with the surname include:

- Guy Murchie (1907–1997), American artist, journalist, and aviator
- Harold H. Murchie (1888–1953), American politician and judge
- James Murchie (1813–1900), Canadian farmer, businessman and politician
- James Stafford Murchie (1850–1888), British trade unionist
- John Carl Murchie (1895–1966), Canadian soldier and Chief of the General Staff
- Peter Murchie (born 1986), English-born Scottish rugby player

== See also ==
- 4642 Murchie, a main-belt asteroid
