= Bockus =

Bockus is a surname. Notable people with the surname include:

- Kathy Bockus, Canadian politician
- Randy Bockus (born 1960), American baseball player
