= Owen Morse =

Owen Morse may refer to:

- Owen Morse, member of American comedy-juggling duo The Passing Zone
- Owen Morse (politician) (1882–1965), Canadian politician
