= George Cockburn (disambiguation) =

Sir George Cockburn, 10th Baronet (1772–1853) was a British naval commander.

George Cockburn may also refer to:

- George Cockburn (Saskatchewan politician) (1876–1966), politician in Saskatchewan, Canada
- George Ralph Richardson Cockburn (1834–1912), politician in Ontario, Canada
- George Bertram Cockburn (1872–1931), British research chemist and aviation pioneer
- George H. I. Cockburn (1889–1957), politician in New Brunswick, Canada

== See also ==
- George Cockburne (died 1770), naval administrator
- George Coburn (1920–2009), Irish politician
- Cockburn (surname)
