= Soucy =

Soucy may refer to:

Places:

- Soucy, Aisne, a commune in the department of Aisne
- Soucy, Yonne, a commune in the department of Yonne

People:

- Soucy (surname)
- Carson Soucy, a Canadian professional ice hockey player, who plays in the National Hockey League (NHL)
