= D'Astous =

D'Astous is a surname. Notable people with the surname include:

- Charle-Edouard D'Astous (born 1998), Canadian ice hockey player
- Jean-Baptiste D'Astous (1904–1998), Canadian politician
- Roger D'Astous (1926–1998), Canadian architect
