= Charlotte West (electoral district) =

Defunct provincial electoral district in New Brunswick, Canada

New Brunswick electoral district

Defunct provincial electoral district
- Legislature: Legislative Assembly of New Brunswick
- District created: 1973
- District abolished: 1994
- First contested: 1974
- Last contested: 1991

Charlotte West was a provincial electoral district for the Legislative Assembly of New Brunswick, Canada; it existed from 1974 to 1995.

It was created from part of the former four-member electoral district of Charlotte during the New Brunswick electoral redistribution of 1973. In the New Brunswick electoral redistribution of 1994, parts of Charlotte West were merged with St. Stephen-Milltown to form the new electoral division of Western Charlotte; the remainder became part of the new electoral district of Fundy Isles.

== Members of the Legislative Assembly ==
Assembly	Years	Member	Party
Riding created from Charlotte
48th	1974–1978	Leland McGaw	Progressive Conservative
49th	1978–1982	Leland McGaw	Progressive Conservative
50th	1982–1987	Leland McGaw	Progressive Conservative
51st	1987–1991	Reid Hurley	Liberal
52nd	1991–1995	Reid Hurley	Liberal
Riding dissolved into Western Charlotte and Fundy Isles

== Election results ==
1991 New Brunswick general election
Party	Candidate	Votes	%	±%
Liberal	Reid Hurley	1,796	45.79	-12.36
Progressive Conservative	Bev Lawrence	1,077	27.46	-9.02
Confederation of Regions	Mabel Groom	768	19.58	–
New Democratic	Ellen Smith	281	7.16	+1.79
Total valid votes		3,922	100.0	
Liberal hold		Swing		-1.67

1987 New Brunswick general election
Party	Candidate	Votes	%	±%
Liberal	Reid Hurley	2,286	58.15	+23.39
Progressive Conservative	Leland W. McGaw	1,434	36.48	-19.49
New Democratic	Ray "Bud" Parks	211	5.37	-3.90
Total valid votes		3,931	100.0	
Liberal gain from Progressive Conservative		Swing		+21.44

1982 New Brunswick general election
Party	Candidate	Votes	%	±%
Progressive Conservative	Leland W. McGaw	1,992	55.97	-2.77
Liberal	Dale E. Lively	1,237	34.76	±0
New Democratic	Joseph N. Hansen	330	9.27	+2.77
Total valid votes		3,559	100.0	
Progressive Conservative hold		Swing		-1.38

1978 New Brunswick general election
Party	Candidate	Votes	%	±%
Progressive Conservative	Leland W. McGaw	1,815	58.74	+3.13
Liberal	Philip Earl Johnson	1,074	34.76	-9.63
New Democratic	William C. Mosher	201	6.50	–
Total valid votes		3,090	100.0	
Progressive Conservative hold		Swing		+6.38

1974 New Brunswick general election
Party	Candidate	Votes	%
Progressive Conservative	Leland McGaw	1,587	55.61
Liberal	Edward John Boone	1,267	44.39
Total valid votes		2,854	100.0
The previous multi-member riding of Charlotte went totally Progressive Conservative in the last election, with Leland McGaw being one of the four incumbents.

== See also ==
- List of New Brunswick provincial electoral districts
- Canadian provincial electoral districts
