= Fundy Isles (electoral district) =

Defunct provincial electoral district in New Brunswick, Canada

New Brunswick electoral district

Defunct provincial electoral district
- Legislature: Legislative Assembly of New Brunswick
- District created: 1994
- District abolished: 2006
- First contested: 1995
- Last contested: 2003

Fundy Isles (French: Îles-de-Fundy) was a provincial electoral district for the Legislative Assembly of New Brunswick, Canada.

It was created in 1994 from Charlotte West and Charlotte-Fundy and was dissolved in 2006 into Charlotte-The Isles and Charlotte-Campobello.

== Members of the Legislative Assembly ==
Assembly	Years	Member	Party
Riding created from Charlotte West and Charlotte-Fundy
53rd	1995–1999	Eric Allaby	Liberal
54th	1999–2003	Eric Allaby	Liberal
55th	2003–2006	Eric Allaby	Liberal
Riding dissolved into Charlotte-The Isles and Charlotte-Campobello

== Election results ==
2003 New Brunswick general election
Party	Candidate	Votes	%	±%
Liberal	Eric Allaby	1,359	52.74	+2.94
Progressive Conservative	Burton Flynn	1,124	43.62	-3.95
New Democratic	Dick Grant	94	3.65	+1.02
Total valid votes		2,577	100.0	
Liberal hold		Swing		+3.44

1999 New Brunswick general election
Party	Candidate	Votes	%	±%
Liberal	Eric Allaby	1,248	49.80	+2.89
Progressive Conservative	Ed Brine	1,192	47.57	+4.17
New Democratic	Bill Barteau	66	2.63	-0.38
Total valid votes		2,506	100.0	
Liberal hold		Swing		-0.64

1995 New Brunswick general election
Party	Candidate	Votes	%	±%
Liberal	Eric Allaby	1,201	46.91	
Progressive Conservative	Bob Jackson	1,111	43.40	
Confederation of Regions	John Cunningham	171	6.68	
New Democratic	Bill Barteau	77	3.01	
Total valid votes		2,560	100.0	
Liberal notional gain		Swing		

== See also ==
- List of New Brunswick provincial electoral districts
- Canadian provincial electoral districts
