= W. M. Jenkins =

Canadian politician

Member of the Legislative Assembly of New Brunswick
- In office 1935–1939
- Constituency: Queens

Personal details
- Born: April 19, 1884 Kings County, New Brunswick
- Died: February 7, 1968 (aged 83) Gagetown, New Brunswick
- Party: New Brunswick Liberal Association
- Spouse: Bessie Jean Osbourne
- Education: Gagetown, New Brunswick
- Occupation: surgeon, physician

Willard Miles Jenkins (April 19, 1884 – February 7, 1968) was a Canadian politician. He served in the Legislative Assembly of New Brunswick as member of the Liberal party from 1935 to 1939.
