= J. Adrien Lévesque =

Canadian politician (1923–1995)

Member of the Legislative Assembly of New Brunswick
- In office 1960–1970
- Constituency: Madawaska

Personal details
- Born: Joseph Adrien Lévesque; September 16, 1923 Powers Creek, New Brunswick, Canada
- Died: March 5, 1995 (aged 71) Ottawa, Ontario, Canada
- Party: New Brunswick Liberal Association
- Spouse: Therese Tremblay
- Children: 9
- Occupation: Civil servant, Minister of Agriculture, Member Canadian Farm product Marketing Board

Joseph Adrien Lévesque (September 16, 1923 – March 5, 1995) was a Canadian politician. He served in the Legislative Assembly of New Brunswick from 1960 to 1970 as member of the Liberal party.
