= Curtis Malloch =

Canadian politician

MLA for Charlotte-Campobello
- In office October 12, 2010 – 2014
- Preceded by: Tony Huntjens
- Succeeded by: John Ames

Personal details
- Party: Progressive Conservative

Curtis Malloch is a Canadian politician, who was elected to the Legislative Assembly of New Brunswick in the 2010 provincial election. He represented the electoral district of Charlotte-Campobello as a member of the Progressive Conservatives until the 2014 provincial election, when he was defeated by John Ames.

== Electoral record ==
2014 New Brunswick general election
Party	Candidate	Votes	%	±%
Liberal	John B. Ames	3,176	41.73	+17.24
Progressive Conservative	Curtis Malloch	2,982	39.19	-8.90
New Democratic	June Greenlaw	515	6.77	-6.12
People's Alliance	Joyce Wright	484	6.36	-0.09
Green	Derek Simon	453	5.95	-2.10
Total valid votes		7,610	99.69	
Total rejected ballots		24	0.31	
Turnout		7,634	60.96	
Eligible voters		12,523		
Liberal notional gain from Progressive Conservative		Swing		+13.07
Voting results declared after judicial recount.
Source: Elections New Brunswick

2010 New Brunswick general election
Party	Candidate	Votes	%	±%
Progressive Conservative	Curtis Malloch	2,977	48.09	-1.62
Liberal	Annabelle Juneau	1,516	24.49	-20.80
New Democratic	Lloyd P. Groom	798	12.89	+7.90
Green	Janice E. Harvey	498	8.05	–
People's Alliance	John Craig	401	6.48	–
Total valid votes		6,190	100.0	
Total rejected ballots		27	0.43	
Turnout		6,217	68.61	
Eligible voters		9,061		
Progressive Conservative hold		Swing		+9.59
Source: Elections New Brunswick
