= Charlotte-Fundy =

Defunct provincial electoral district in New Brunswick, Canada

New Brunswick electoral district

Defunct provincial electoral district
- Legislature: Legislative Assembly of New Brunswick
- District created: 1973
- District abolished: 1994
- First contested: 1974
- Last contested: 1991

Charlotte-Fundy was a provincial electoral district in New Brunswick, Canada. It was created from the multi-member riding of Charlotte in the 1973 electoral redistribution, and was abolished in the 1994 electoral redistribution.

== Members of the Legislative Assembly ==
Assembly	Years	Member	Party
Riding created from Charlotte (1785–1974)
48th	1974–1978	James Tucker	Progressive Conservative
49th	1978–1982	James Tucker	Progressive Conservative
50th	1982–1987	James Tucker	Progressive Conservative
51st	1987–1991	Eric Allaby	Liberal
52nd	1991–1995	Eric Allaby	Liberal
Riding dissolved into Charlotte (1994–2006), Fundy Isles and New Maryland

== Election results ==
1991 New Brunswick general election
Party	Candidate	Votes	%	±%
Liberal	Eric Allaby	1,950	50.69	-10.65
Confederation of Regions	Keith B. Guptilt	957	24.88	–
Progressive Conservative	Sharon Tucker	757	19.68	-13.53
New Democratic	Dorothy Matthews	183	4.76	-0.69
Total valid votes		3,847	100.0	
Liberal hold		Swing		-17.76

1987 New Brunswick general election
Party	Candidate	Votes	%	±%
Liberal	Eric Allaby	2,475	61.34	+28.07
Progressive Conservative	James Nelson Tucker	1,340	33.21	-26.72
New Democratic	Dorothy Matthews	220	5.45	-1.35
Total valid votes		4,035	100.0	
Liberal gain from Progressive Conservative		Swing		+27.40

1982 New Brunswick general election
Party	Candidate	Votes	%	±%
Progressive Conservative	James Tucker	2,291	59.93	+5.79
Liberal	Eric Allaby	1,272	33.27	-7.49
New Democratic	Jim Aucoin	260	6.80	+1.70
Total valid votes		3,823	100.0	
Progressive Conservative hold		Swing		+6.64

1978 New Brunswick general election
Party	Candidate	Votes	%	±%
Progressive Conservative	James Nelson Tucker	1,741	54.14	-7.90
Liberal	Bernard L. Moses	1,311	40.76	+2.80
New Democratic	George Robertson	164	5.10	–
Total valid votes		3,216	100.0	
Progressive Conservative hold		Swing		-5.35

1974 New Brunswick general election
Party	Candidate	Votes	%
Progressive Conservative	James Tucker	1,811	62.04
Liberal	Paul S. Ukrainetz	1,108	37.96
Total valid votes		2,919	100.0
The previous multi-member riding of Charlotte went totally Progressive Conservative, with James Tucker being one of the four incumbents.

== See also ==
- List of New Brunswick provincial electoral districts
- Canadian provincial electoral districts
