= Tony Huntjens =

Canadian politician

Antoon J. "Tony" Huntjens (born January 1, 1939, in Limburg, Netherlands) is a former teacher and New Brunswick politician. A resident of St. Stephen, New Brunswick, where he taught High School for thirty-three years, he was a member of the Legislative Assembly of New Brunswick for the riding of Western Charlotte.

In the fall of 1961, Huntjens became a Canadian citizen. He studied at the University of New Brunswick in Fredericton, graduating with a Bachelor of Teaching and a Bachelor of Education degree. He first became active in politics as a member of the Confederation of Regions Party of New Brunswick (CoR) and was the president of that organization and its candidate in Western Charlotte in the 1995 election. He placed third with 23.7% of the vote, just 162 votes short of the second place Progressive Conservative candidate but well behind the victorious Liberal.

Following the 1995 election, which saw CoR slip from official opposition to zero seats in the legislature, Huntjens joined the Progressive Conservatives and eventually became their candidate for the 1999 election again in Western Charlotte. This time he was successful, winning 51.0% of the vote to 44.9% for his Liberal opponent. Huntjens spent his first term as a backbencher but was re-elected in the 2003 election and joined the cabinet as Minister of Family and Community Services.

Huntjens was forced to resign from cabinet on October 31, 2005 after he accidentally revealed the identity of an autistic man under the care of his department to a journalist on October 27. When Lord shuffled his cabinet on February 14, 2006 Huntjens was not included, though it was widely expected he would be, but Lord did announce that he would support Huntjens for speaker of the legislature as the position became vacant when Lord named the incumbent speaker to cabinet. Huntjens did not become speaker, however, when he withdrew his name from contention when it became apparent that independent member Michael Malley was interested in the post, Malley's election saved the government from losing a voting member and thus created a great deal more flexibility in the standings of the legislature.

New Brunswick provincial government of Bernard Lord
Cabinet post (1)
Predecessor	Office	Successor
Joan MacAlpine	Minister of Family and Community Services; 2003–2005; MacAlpine-Stiles succeeded Huntjens as Acting Minister	Joan MacAlpine-Stiles
Special Cabinet Responsibilities
Predecessor	Title	Successor
Alexander Huntjens	Minister responsible for Seniors; 2003–2005 new designation	Joan MacAlpine-Stiles
Other offices
new district	MLA for Charlotte-Campobello; 2006–2010	Curtis Malloch
Preceded by Ann Breault (Liberal)	MLA for Western Charlotte; 1999–2006	district abolished
