= George H. I. Cockburn =

Canadian politician

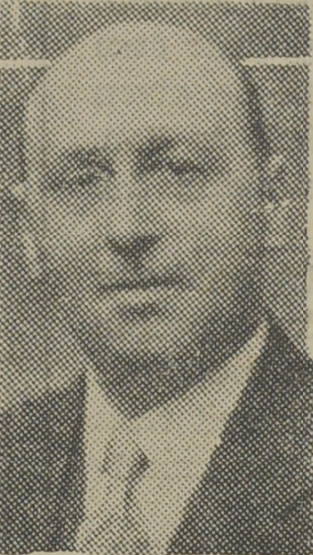
Cockburn, pictured in a 1935 newspaper

George Herbert Ingalls Cockburn (April 14, 1889 – April 21, 1957) was a Canadian politician in the Province of New Brunswick. He was born in St. Andrews, New Brunswick, the son of Melville N. Cockburn and Katie Shaw. He was elected to the Legislative Assembly in the 1930 New Brunswick general election as a Progressive Conservative Party candidate in the multi-member riding of Charlotte County.

Legislative Assembly of New Brunswick
Preceded by James S. Lord	MLA for Charlotte County; 1930-1935	Succeeded by J. Fraser Keay
