= Héliodore Côté =

Canadian politician

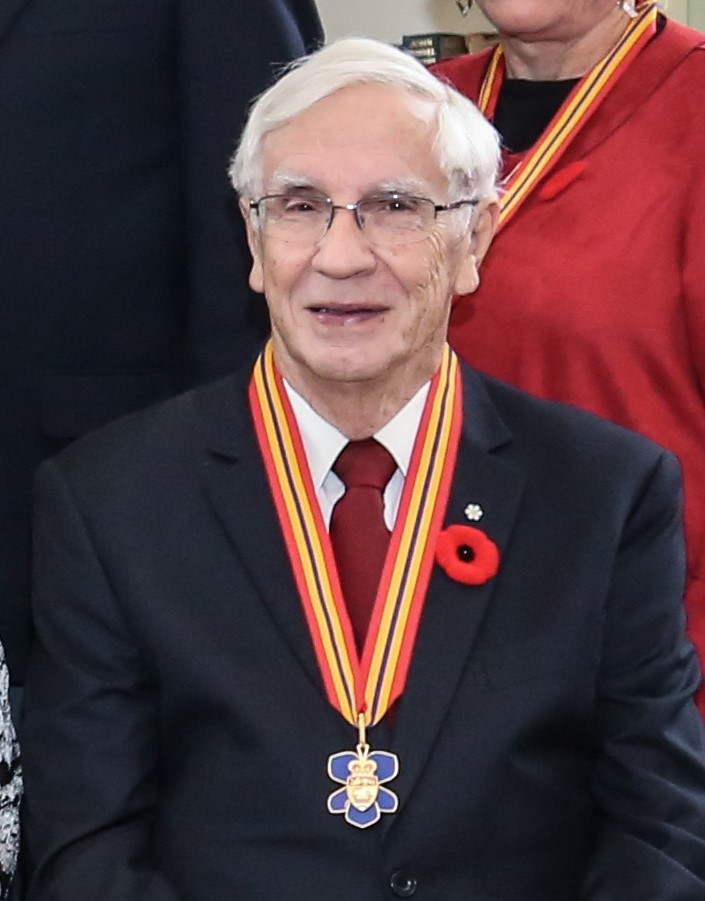
- Côté in 2019

MLA for Madawaska South
- In office 1978–1982
- Preceded by: Daniel Daigle
- Succeeded by: Percy Mockler

Personal details
- Born: October 19, 1934 Saint-Quentin, New Brunswick
- Died: February 6, 2022 (aged 87) Saint-Léonard, New Brunswick
- Party: New Brunswick Liberal Association
- Occupation: Businessman

Héliodore Côté (October 19, 1934 – February 6, 2022) was a Canadian politician. He served in the Legislative Assembly of New Brunswick from 1978 to 1982, as a Liberal member for the constituency of Madawaska South.

Côté died on February 6, 2022, in Saint-Léonard.
