= Saint Croix (electoral district) =

Provincial electoral district in New Brunswick, Canada

Coordinates: 45°12′11″N 67°19′06″W

New Brunswick electoral district
- The riding of Saint Croix (as it exists from 2023) in relation to other New Brunswick electoral districts

Provincial electoral district
- Legislature: Legislative Assembly of New Brunswick
MLA
Kathy Bockus
Progressive Conservative
- District created: 1994
- First contested: 1995
- Last contested: 2024

Demographics
- Population (2011): 16,833
- Electors (2013): 11,196
- Census division(s): Charlotte, York
- Census subdivision(s): Campobello Island, Dufferin, Dumbarton, Manners Sutton, McAdam (parish), McAdam (village), Prince William, Saint Andrews (parish), Saint Andrews (town), Saint Croix, Saint David, Saint George, Saint James, Saint Patrick, Saint Stephen, St. Stephen

Saint Croix is a provincial electoral district for the Legislative Assembly of New Brunswick, Canada. The district includes the Town of St. Stephen and the town of St. Andrews.

It was created as Western Charlotte in 1994 by merging the old districts of Charlotte West and St. Stephen-Milltown save for Deer Island and Campobello Island which became part of Fundy Isles, the rather atypical name of "Western Charlotte" was chosen to prevent confusion with the old smaller district of "Charlotte West". The riding also added a small piece of territory from Charlotte Centre.

In 2006, the district again added Campobello Island and the name was changed from Western Charlotte to Charlotte-Campobello.

In 2013, the district expanded northward adding the McAdam area.

In 2016, the riding was renamed Saint Croix.

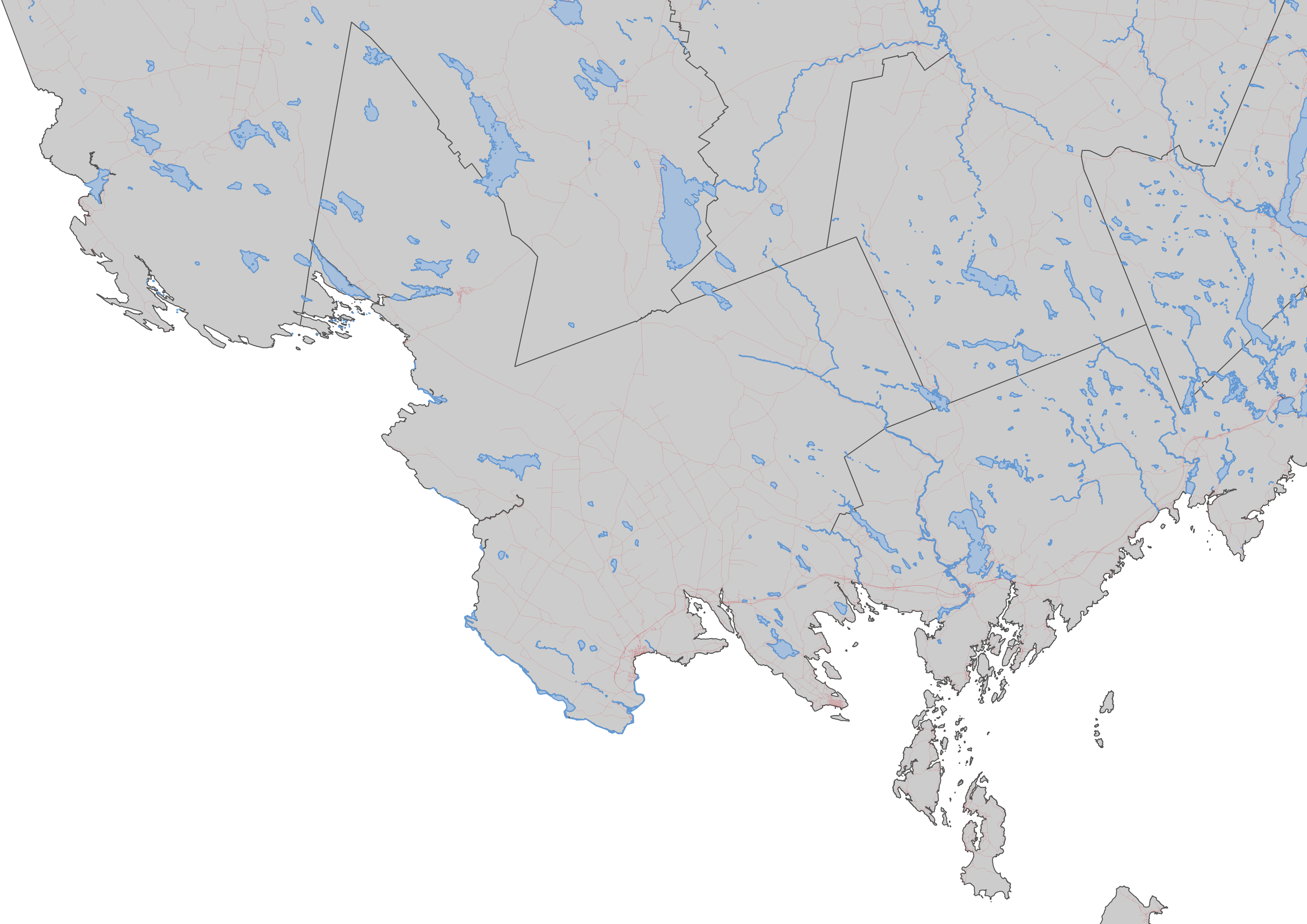
Saint Croix (as it exists from 2023) and the roads in the riding

== Members of the Legislative Assembly ==
Assembly	Years	Member	Party
Western Charlotte
Riding created from St. Stephen-Milltown, Charlotte West and Charlotte Centre
53rd	1995–1999	Ann Breault	Liberal
54th	1999–2003	Tony Huntjens	Progressive Conservative
55th	2003–2006	Tony Huntjens	Progressive Conservative
Charlotte-Campobello
56th	2006–2010	Tony Huntjens	Progressive Conservative
57th	2010–2014	Curtis Malloch	Progressive Conservative
58th	2014–2016	John Ames	Liberal
Saint Croix
58th	2016–2018	John Ames	Liberal
59th	2018–2019	Greg Thompson	Progressive Conservative
60th	2020–2024	Kathy Bockus	Progressive Conservative
61st	2024–Present	Kathy Bockus	Progressive Conservative

== Election results ==
=== Saint Croix ===
2024 New Brunswick general election
Party	Candidate	Votes	%	±%
Progressive Conservative	Kathy Bockus	3,271	45.34	+0.5
Liberal	Troy Lyons	2,063	28.60	+23.5
Green	Mark Groleau	1,442	19.99	+4.1
Independent	Kris Booth	170	2.36	-
People's Alliance	Alex Tessmann	96	1.33	-29.9
New Democratic	Bola Ademolu	90	1.25	-0.7
Libertarian	Krysten Mitchell	82	1.14	-
Total valid votes		7,214	99.85	
Total rejected ballots		11	0.15	
Turnout		7,225	-	
Eligible voters		-		
Progressive Conservative hold		Swing		-11.5
Source: Elections New Brunswick

2020 provincial election redistributed results
Party	%
Progressive Conservative	44.8
People's Alliance	32.3
Green	15.9
Liberal	5.1
New Democratic	1.9

2020 New Brunswick general election
Party	Candidate	Votes	%	±%
Progressive Conservative	Kathy Bockus	3,570	45.18	+5.97
People's Alliance	Rod Cumberland	2,546	32.22	+14.53
Green	Kim Reeder	1,238	15.67	+3.04
Liberal	John Wayne Gardner	401	5.07	-24.33
New Democratic	Brad McKinney	147	1.86	+0.79
Total valid votes		7,902	99.76	
Total rejected ballots		19	0.24	
Turnout		7,921	66.09	
Eligible voters		11,985		
Progressive Conservative hold		Swing		-4.28
Source: Elections New Brunswick

2018 New Brunswick general election
Party	Candidate	Votes	%	±%
Progressive Conservative	Greg Thompson	3,249	39.21	+0.02
Liberal	John Ames	2,436	29.40	-12.34
People's Alliance	Joyce Wright	1,466	17.69	+11.74
Green	Donna Linton	1,047	12.63	+6.27
New Democratic	Jan Underhill	89	1.07	-5.69
Total valid votes		8,287	100.0	
Total rejected ballots		14	0.17	-0.15
Turnout		8,301	66.19	+7.22
Eligible voters		12,176		
Progressive Conservative gain from Liberal		Swing		+6.18
Source: Elections New Brunswick

=== Charlotte-Campobello ===
2014 New Brunswick general election
Party	Candidate	Votes	%	±%
Liberal	John B. Ames	3,176	41.73	+17.24
Progressive Conservative	Curtis Malloch	2,982	39.19	-8.90
New Democratic	June Greenlaw	515	6.77	-6.12
People's Alliance	Joyce Wright	484	6.36	-0.09
Green	Derek Simon	453	5.95	-2.10
Total valid votes		7,610	99.69	
Total rejected ballots		24	0.31	
Turnout		7,634	60.96	
Eligible voters		12,523		
Liberal notional gain from Progressive Conservative		Swing		+13.07
Voting results declared after judicial recount.
Source: Elections New Brunswick

2010 New Brunswick general election
Party	Candidate	Votes	%	±%
Progressive Conservative	Curtis Malloch	2,977	48.09	-1.62
Liberal	Annabelle Juneau	1,516	24.49	-20.80
New Democratic	Lloyd P. Groom	798	12.89	+7.90
Green	Janice E. Harvey	498	8.05	–
People's Alliance	John Craig	401	6.48	–
Total valid votes		6,190	100.0	
Total rejected ballots		27	0.43	
Turnout		6,217	68.61	
Eligible voters		9,061		
Progressive Conservative hold		Swing		+9.59
Source: Elections New Brunswick

2006 New Brunswick general election
Party	Candidate	Votes	%	±%
Progressive Conservative	Tony Huntjens	3,157	49.72	+2.70
Liberal	Robert N. Tinker	2,876	45.29	+1.43
New Democratic	Andrew Graham	317	4.99	-4.14
Total valid votes		6,350	100.0	
Progressive Conservative notional hold		Swing		+0.64
Source: Elections New Brunswick

=== Western Charlotte ===
2003 New Brunswick general election
Party	Candidate	Votes	%	±%
Progressive Conservative	Tony Huntjens	2,854	47.02	-3.97
Liberal	Madeleine Drummie	2,662	43.86	-1.01
New Democratic	Andrew Graham	554	9.13	+4.99
Total valid votes		6,070	100.0	
Progressive Conservative hold		Swing		-1.48
Source: Elections New Brunswick

1999 New Brunswick general election
Party	Candidate	Votes	%	±%
Progressive Conservative	Tony Huntjens	3,490	50.99	+24.74
Liberal	Peter Heelis	3,071	44.87	-1.21
New Democratic	Andrew Gordon Graham	283	4.14	+0.29
Total valid votes		6,844	100.0	
Progressive Conservative gain from Liberal		Swing		+25.95
Progressive Conservative candidate Tony Huntjens gained 27.17 percentage points from his 1995 performance running as a Confederation of Regions candidate.
Source: Elections New Brunswick

1995 New Brunswick general election
Party	Candidate	Votes	%	±%
Liberal	Ann Breault	3,076	46.08	
Progressive Conservative	Ken Stevens	1,752	26.25	
Confederation of Regions	Tony Huntjens	1,590	23.82	
New Democratic	John Alexander	257	3.85	
Total valid votes		6,675	100.0	
Liberal notional hold		Swing		
Source: Elections New Brunswick

== See also ==
- List of New Brunswick provincial electoral districts
- Canadian provincial electoral districts
