= Reid Hurley =

Canadian politician

MLA for Charlotte West
- In office 1987–1995
- Preceded by: Leland McGaw

Personal details
- Born: March 15, 1944 (age 82) Saint Stephen, New Brunswick
- Party: New Brunswick Liberal Association

Leonard "Reid" Hurley (born March 15, 1944) is a former Canadian politician. He served in the Legislative Assembly of New Brunswick from 1987 to 1995, as a Liberal member for the constituency of Charlotte West. He is a teacher.
