= Madawaska South =

Defunct provincial electoral district in New Brunswick, Canada

New Brunswick electoral district

Defunct provincial electoral district
- Legislature: Legislative Assembly of New Brunswick
- District created: 1973
- District abolished: 1994
- First contested: 1974
- Last contested: 1991

Madawaska South was a provincial electoral district in New Brunswick, Canada. It was created from the multi-member riding of Madawaska in the 1973 electoral redistribution, and abolished in the 1994 electoral redistribution.

== Members of the Legislative Assembly ==
Assembly	Years	Member	Party
Riding created from Madawaska
48th	1974–1978	Daniel Daigle	Liberal
49th	1978–1982	Héliodore Côté	Liberal
50th	1982–1987	Percy Mockler	Progressive Conservative
51st	1987–1991	Pierrette Ringuette	Liberal
52nd	1991–1995	Pierrette Ringuette	Liberal
Riding dissolved into Madawaska-la-Vallée

== Election results ==
New Brunswick provincial by-election, 29 November 1993 On the resignation of Pierrette Ringuette
Party	Candidate	Votes	
Progressive Conservative	Percy Mockler	2,590	
Liberal	Nicole Thériault	2,182	
New Democratic	Noëlla T. Simard	65	
Total valid votes		4,837	
Progressive Conservative gain		Swing	{{{3}}}
Source: The Legislative Library of New Brunswick

1991 New Brunswick general election
Party	Candidate	Votes	%	±%
Liberal	Pierrette Ringuette	2,843	59.64	+7.70
Progressive Conservative	Théo Poitras	1,715	35.98	-9.46
New Democratic	Julien Tardif	209	4.38	+1.76
Total valid votes		4,767	100.0	
Liberal hold		Swing		+8.58

1987 New Brunswick general election
Party	Candidate	Votes	%	±%
Liberal	Pierrette Ringuette	2,597	51.94	+7.62
Progressive Conservative	Percy P. Mockler	2,272	45.44	-8.41
New Democratic	Jean-Claude Bosse	131	2.62	+0.79
Total valid votes		5,000	100.0	
Liberal gain from Progressive Conservative		Swing		+8.02

1982 New Brunswick general election
Party	Candidate	Votes	%	±%
Progressive Conservative	Percy Mockler	2,561	53.85	+19.13
Liberal	Héliodore Côté	2,108	44.32	-1.18
New Democratic	Paul Murphy	87	1.83	–
Total valid votes		4,756	100.0	
Progressive Conservative gain from Liberal		Swing		+10.16

1978 New Brunswick general election
Party	Candidate	Votes	%	±%
Liberal	Héliodore Côté	1,832	45.50	-11.23
Progressive Conservative	Jean-Marc Violette	1,398	34.72	-5.29
Independent	Père Léo Theriault	659	16.37	–
Parti acadien	Jacques Lapointe	137	3.40	+0.13
Total valid votes		4,026	100.0	
Liberal hold		Swing		-2.97
Independent candidate Léo Theriault lost 23.64 percentage points from his 1974 performance running as a Progressive Conservative.

1974 New Brunswick general election
Party	Candidate	Votes	%
Liberal	Daniel Daigle	1,893	56.73
Progressive Conservative	Léo Theriault	1,335	40.01
Parti acadien	Jeanne-D'Arc Fortin	109	3.27
Total valid votes		3,337	100.0
The previous multi-member riding of Madawaska returned three Liberals in the previous election, with Daniel Daigle being one of three incumbents.

== See also ==
- List of New Brunswick provincial electoral districts
- Canadian provincial electoral districts
