= Jock Fraser =

Canadian politician (1912–1981)

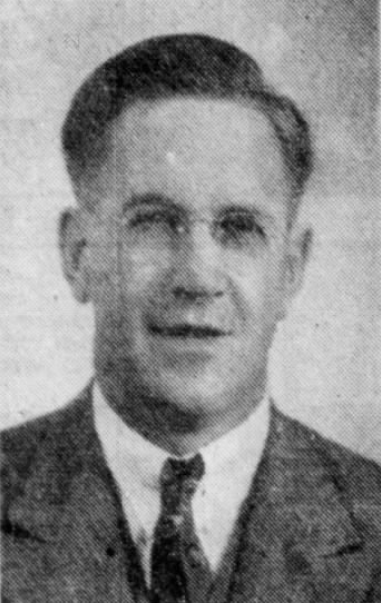
- Fraser, pictured in a 1948 newspaper

Member of the Legislative Assembly of New Brunswick
- In office 1948–1952
- Constituency: Queens

Personal details
- Born: March 4, 1912 Contin, Ross-shire, Scotland
- Died: June 28, 1981 (aged 69) Woodstock, New Brunswick
- Party: New Brunswick Liberal Association
- Spouse: Dorothy Kilpatrick
- Children: 2
- Occupation: businessman

John Fraser (March 4, 1912 – June 28, 1981) was a Canadian politician. He served in the Legislative Assembly of New Brunswick as member of the Liberal party from 1948 to 1952.
