= Gale S. McLaughlin =

Canadian politician (1933–2018)

Member of the Legislative Assembly of New Brunswick
- In office 1957–1960
- Constituency: Charlotte

Personal details
- Born: March 2, 1933 Seal Cove, New Brunswick
- Died: June 12, 2018 (aged 85) North Head, New Brunswick
- Party: Progressive Conservative Party of New Brunswick
- Education: Dalhousie University
- Occupation: Fish Processing

Gale Sherwood McLaughlin (March 2, 1933 – June 12, 2018) was a Canadian politician. Born at Seal Cove on the island of Grand Manan, he was the son of Gerald and Doris (Wilcox) McLaughlin. Previous to being elected, he worked as a merchant, lobster buyer and weir fisherman on the island. He served in the Legislative Assembly of New Brunswick from 1957 to 1960 as member of the Progressive Conservative Party of New Brunswick from the constituency of Charlotte.
