= John E. Rigby =

Canadian politician (1923–1972)

Member of the Legislative Assembly of New Brunswick
- In office 1967–1972
- Constituency: Charlotte

Personal details
- Born: July 20, 1923 Bayside, New Brunswick
- Died: September 8, 1972 (aged 49) St. Andrews, New Brunswick
- Party: Progressive Conservative Party of New Brunswick
- Spouse: Ann Gunter
- Children: 3
- Occupation: physician

John Edward Rigby (July 20, 1923 – September 8, 1972) was a Canadian politician. He served in the Legislative Assembly of New Brunswick from 1967 to 1972 as member of the Progressive Conservative party.

Rigby died at his home on September 8, 1972, from coronary thrombosis.
