= Walter C. Lawson =

Canadian politician (1889–1970)

- Born: February 1, 1889; Norton Station, New Brunswick
- Died: 1970 (aged 80–81); Fredericton, New Brunswick
- Resting place: Fredericton Rural Cemetery
- Education: Acadia University, King's College
- Occupations: Lawyer, politician
- Political party: Liberal
- Spouse: Mary Josephine Kearney (1902-1991)
- Children: Ann Marie. Margaret. Barbara. William. Frances. Elizabeth. Charlotte. John.
- Parent(s): John James Lawson & Annie C. Upham

Walter Cyril Lawson BCL (February 1, 1889 – 1970) was a lawyer, notary public and political figure in the Province of New Brunswick, Canada. He represented Sunbury County in the Legislative Assembly of New Brunswick from 1935 to 1944 as a Liberal member.

== Biography ==
He was born in Norton Station, New Brunswick, the son of John James Lawson and Annie C. Upham. Lawson was educated at Acadia University and King's College Law School. In 1925, he married Mary Josephine Kearney. Lawson was a member of the council for Sunbury County from 1927 to 1931. He served in the Canadian Expeditionary Force during World War I.

His brother Gordon R. Lawson also served in the provincial assembly.
