= Department of Labour (New Brunswick) =

The Department of Labour was a part of the Government of New Brunswick. It was charged with the enforcement of labour standards and facilitating relations between employers and employees in New Brunswick. This department was separated from the Department of Health in 1944. The department was renamed Labour and Human Resources in 1983 and then Labour and Manpower in 1985. From 1991 to 1998, this department's functions were incorporated in the Department of Advanced Education and Labour. In 1998, that department's functions were split between the Department of Labour and the Department of Education. In 2000, most of the department's functions were transferred to the new Department of Training and Employment Development.

== Ministers ==
#	Minister	Term	Government
1.	E. S. Mooers	September 27, 1944 – October 8, 1952	under John McNair
2.	Arthur Skaling	October 8, 1952 – March 24, 1960	under Hugh John Flemming
3.	K. J. Webber	July 12, 1960 – November 20, 1967	under Louis Robichaud
4.	H. H. Williamson	November 20, 1967 – February 11, 1970	under Louis Robichaud
5.	Fernand Nadeau	February 11, 1970 – November 12, 1970?	under Louis Robichaud
6.	Rodman Logan	July 18, 1972 – March 22, 1977	under Richard Hatfield
7.	Paul Creaghan	March 22, 1977 – November 1, 1977	under Richard Hatfield
8.	Lawrence Garvie	November 1, 1977 – November 21, 1978	under Richard Hatfield
9.	Mabel M. DeWare	November 21, 1978 – October 20, 1982	under Richard Hatfield
10.	Joseph Mombourquette	October 20, 1982 - October 27, 1987	under Richard Hatfield
11.	Mike McKee	October 27, 1987 – October 9, 1991	under Frank McKenna
12.	Joan Kingston	May 14, 1998 – June 21, 1999	under Camille Thériault
13.	Norm McFarlane	June 11, 1999 – June 27, 1999	under Bernard Lord
