= Vance R. Huntley =

Canadian politician

Member of the Legislative Assembly of New Brunswick
- In office 1952–1956
- Constituency: Charlotte

Personal details
- Born: June 10, 1911 Grand Harbour, New Brunswick
- Died: September 15, 1996 (aged 85) St. Stephen, New Brunswick
- Party: Progressive Conservative Party of New Brunswick
- Spouse: Lottie Loleta Bishop
- Occupation: businessman

Vance Rupert Huntley (June 10, 1911 – September 15, 1996) was a Canadian politician. He served in the Legislative Assembly of New Brunswick as member of the Progressive Conservative party from 1952 to 1956.
