= Robert Jackson (Canadian politician) =

Canadian politician

Member of the Legislative Assembly of New Brunswick
- In office 1982–1987
- Preceded by: Bill Cockburn
- Succeeded by: Ann Breault
- Constituency: St. Stephen-Milltown

Personal details
- Born: March 13, 1936 St. Stephen, New Brunswick
- Died: December 22, 2012 (aged 76) St. Stephen, New Brunswick
- Party: Progressive Conservative Party of New Brunswick
- Spouse: L. Joyce Jackson
- Children: 2

Robert C. Jackson (March 13, 1936 – December 22, 2012) was a Canadian politician. He served in the Legislative Assembly of New Brunswick from 1982 to 1987 from the electoral district of St. Stephen-Milltown as a member of the Progressive Conservative party.

He died on December 22, 2012
