= Arthur R. MacKenzie =

Canadian politician (1873–1963)

Member of the Legislative Assembly of New Brunswick
- In office 1926–1930
- Constituency: St. Stephen-Milltown

Personal details
- Born: June 26, 1873 St. Stephen, New Brunswick
- Died: February 10, 1963 (aged 89) St. Stephen, New Brunswick
- Party: Conservative Party of New Brunswick
- Spouse: Inez Tibbits
- Children: seven
- Occupation: Sales manager

Arthur Robert MacKenzie (June 26, 1873 – February 10, 1963) was a Canadian politician. He served in the Legislative Assembly of New Brunswick as member of the Conservative party representing St. Stephen-Milltown from 1926 to 1930.
