= Clarence Bourque =

Canadian politician

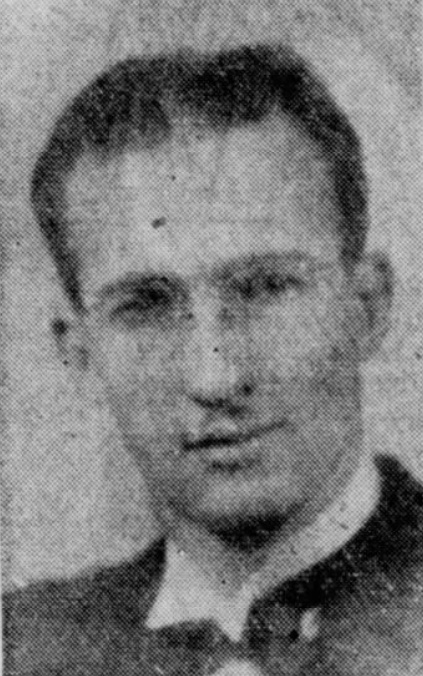
- Bourque, pictured in a 1948 newspaper

Member of the Legislative Assembly of New Brunswick
- In office 1948–1952
- Constituency: Madawaska

Personal details
- Born: March 28, 1918 Edmundston, New Brunswick
- Died: September 11, 2008 (aged 90) Edmundston, New Brunswick
- Party: New Brunswick Liberal Association
- Spouse: Francoise Gagnon
- Children: 2
- Occupation: physician

Jean Clarence Bourque (March 28, 1918 – September 11, 2008) was a Canadian politician. He served in the Legislative Assembly of New Brunswick as member of the Liberal party from 1948 to 1952.
