= Soucy (surname) =

Soucy is a surname. Notable people with the surname include:

- Brigitte Soucy (born 1972), Canadian volleyball player
- Carson Soucy (born 1994), Canadian ice hockey player
- Chantal Soucy (born 1974), Canadian politician from Quebec
- Christian Soucy (born 1970), Canadian ice hockey player
- Danny Soucy, Canadian politician from New Brunswick
- David Soucy (born 1957), American politician from Vermont
- Donna Soucy (born 1967), American politician from New Hampshire
- Fred E. Soucy (1922–1993), Canadian politician from New Brunswick
- Gaétan Soucy (1958–2013), Canadian novelist
- Gene Soucy, American aviator
- Jean-Pierre Soucy (born 1952), Canadian politician from Quebec
- Mike Soucy (born 1971), American drummer
- Robert Soucy (born 1933), American historian
- Peter Soucy, Canadian comedian and actor
