= H. H. Williamson =

Canadian politician

Member of the Legislative Assembly of New Brunswick
- In office 1960–1972
- Constituency: Gloucester; Bathurst

Personal details
- Born: Harry Havelock Williamson; August 19, 1916 Bathurst, New Brunswick
- Died: August 24, 1972 (aged 56) Northumberland County, New Brunswick
- Party: New Brunswick Liberal Association
- Spouse: Alice M. Brown

Harry Havelock Williamson (August 19, 1916 – August 24, 1972) was a prospector and political figure in New Brunswick, Canada. He represented Gloucester County and then Bathurst in the Legislative Assembly of New Brunswick as a Liberal from 1960 to 1972.

He was born in Bathurst, New Brunswick, the son of Douglas R. Williamson and Ethel Mary Rennie. Williamson was educated at Sacred Heart University. In 1936, he married Alice M. Brown. He was involved in the lumber and mining industries. Williamson served as a captain in the Canadian Army during World War II and in Germany from 1951 to 1953. He was named speaker for the provincial assembly in 1966. Williamson served in the province's Executive Council as Minister of Labour from 1967 to 1970 and then as Minister of Economic Growth in 1970.

Williamson died while in office on August 24, 1972, at the age of 56. He died at a family summer camp in Red Pine Knoll, located along the Nepisiguit River in Northumberland County.

Cabinet posts (2)
Predecessor	Office	Successor
Robert J. Higgins	'Minister of Economic Growth'; 1970	A. Edison Stairs
Kenneth J. Webber	'Minister of Labour'; 1967–1970	Fernand Nadeau
