= Bill Cockburn (politician) =

Canadian politician

Member of the Legislative Assembly of New Brunswick
- In office 1967–1982
- Succeeded by: Bob Jackson
- Constituency: Charlotte (1967–74); St. Stephen-Milltown (1974–82)

Personal details
- Born: February 14, 1931 St. Stephen, New Brunswick
- Died: August 2, 1997 (aged 66) St. Stephen, New Brunswick
- Party: Progressive Conservative Party of New Brunswick
- Spouse: Marjorie Mary Theresa Ryan
- Children: 3
- Education: University of New Brunswick
- Occupation: lawyer

George William Norman Cockburn (February 14, 1931 – August 2, 1997) was a Canadian politician. He served in the Legislative Assembly of New Brunswick from 1967 to 1982 as member of the Progressive Conservative party from the constituency of Charlotte from 1967 to 1974 and St. Stephen-Milltown from 1974 to 1982.
