= Eric Allaby =

Canadian politician

Chair of the Liberal caucus
- In office 1998–1999
- Preceded by: John McKay
- Succeeded by: Shawn Graham

Member of the New Brunswick Legislative Assembly
- In office October 13, 1987 – September 18, 2006
- Preceded by: James N. Tucker Jr.
- Succeeded by: District abolished
- Constituency: Charlotte-Fundy (1987–1995); Fundy Isles (1995–2006)

Personal details
- Born: Kenneth Eric Allaby; August 7, 1943 (age 83) Grand Manan, New Brunswick, Canada
- Party: Liberal
- Education: Acadia University (BS)
- Occupation: Professional diver, author

Kenneth Eric Allaby (born August 7, 1943) is a former New Brunswick politician.

Allaby was born in India, while his father Rev. Perry Allaby, and mother Edith MacLaughlin were Baptist missionaries.

== Provincial politics ==
He first ran for the Legislative Assembly of New Brunswick as the Liberal candidate for the Charlotte-Fundy riding in the 1982 election but was defeated. He won the seat in the 1987 election in which Frank McKenna's Liberal party captured every seat. He was re-elected in Charlotte-Fundy in 1991 and won the newly created Fundy Isles constituency in 1995, 1999 and 2003.

In 2007, he was named to the board of directors for the New Brunswick Provincial Capital Commission.

== Marine history ==
Allaby has a Bachelor of Science degree from Acadia University, where he studied physics. He financed his education by working as a diver in Grand Manan fishing weirs and later worked as a salvage diver removing brass and copper from shipwrecks in the Bay of Fundy. In 1970 and 1971 he was funded by the Ford Foundation to study marine history, and spent three months at Lloyd's of London researching shipwrecks. From 1973 to 1976 he worked on underwater archaeology with funding from the national museums of Canada.

Allaby served as curator of the Grand Manan Museum, where he succeeded his mentor Lincoln Keith Ingersoll. He has written several books about shipwrecks and marine history.
