= John Ames (politician) =

Canadian politician (born 1983)

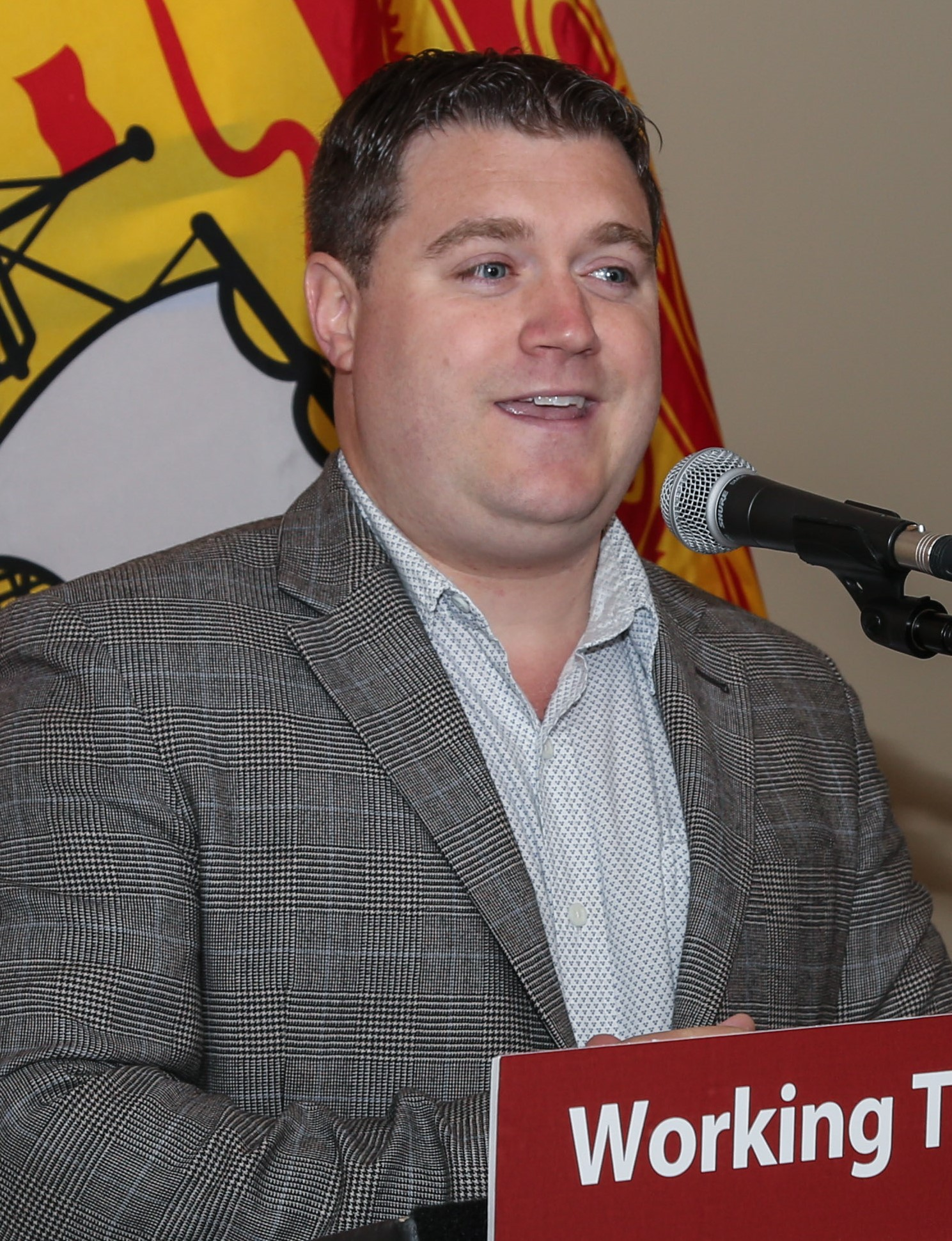
- Ames in 2017

Minister of Tourism, Heritage, and Culture
- In office June 6, 2016 – October 5, 2018
- Premier: Brian Gallant
- Preceded by: Bill Fraser
- Succeeded by: Gilles LePage

Member of the New Brunswick Legislative Assembly for Saint Croix Charlotte-Campobello (2014-16)
- In office September 22, 2014 – September 24, 2018
- Preceded by: Curtis Malloch
- Succeeded by: Greg Thompson

Personal details
- Born: January 2, 1983 (age 42); Saint John, New Brunswick
- Political party: Liberal

John B. Ames (born January 2, 1983, in Saint John, New Brunswick) is a Canadian politician, who was elected to the Legislative Assembly of New Brunswick in the 2014 provincial election. He represented Saint Croix as a member of the Liberal Party, but was voted out by the people of Charlotte-Campobello / Saint Croix in the September 24, 2018, election, being replaced by Greg Thompson.

He was appointed to the New Brunswick Cabinet on June 6, 2016, where he took on the portfolios of Tourism, Heritage and Culture. He sat on Her Majesty's Executive Council Office in his capacity as Minister of the Crown, serving on various committees.

Prior to his election to the NB Legislature, Ames was a municipal councillor in St. Stephen. He served as deputy mayor from May 2012 to September 2014.
