= Thomas F. Barker =

Canadian politician

Thomas F. Barker (September 3, 1828 – December 24, 1896) was a political figure in New Brunswick. He represented York County in the Legislative Assembly of New Brunswick from 1875 to 1878 as a Conservative member.

He was born in St. Mary's, New Brunswick, the son of Anthony Barker, and was educated in Fredericton. Barker married Hannah Miles. He served on the county council for 14 years, serving 4 years as county warden.
