= Daniel Daigle =

Canadian politician

MLA for Madawaska South
- In office 1974–1978
- Succeeded by: Héliodore Côté

Personal details
- Born: February 7, 1939 (age 87) Saint-Léonard, New Brunswick
- Party: New Brunswick Liberal Association
- Spouse: Philippa Cyr
- Occupation: insurance agent

Daniel G. Daigle (born February 7, 1939) is a Canadian politician. He served in the Legislative Assembly of New Brunswick from 1974 to 1978, as a Liberal member for the constituency of Madawaska South.
