= Leland McGaw =

Canadian politician

MLA for Charlotte West
- In office 1967–1987
- Succeeded by: Reid Hurley

Personal details
- Born: July 27, 1927 Oak Hill, New Brunswick
- Died: March 26, 2017 (aged 89) Fredericton, New Brunswick
- Party: Progressive Conservative Party of New Brunswick

Leland Watson McGaw (July 27, 1927 – March 26, 2017) was a Canadian politician. He served in the Legislative Assembly of New Brunswick from 1967 to 1987, as a Progressive Conservative member for the constituency of Charlotte West (Charlotte from 1967 to 1974).
