= R. Fraser Keay =

Canadian politician (1900–1963)

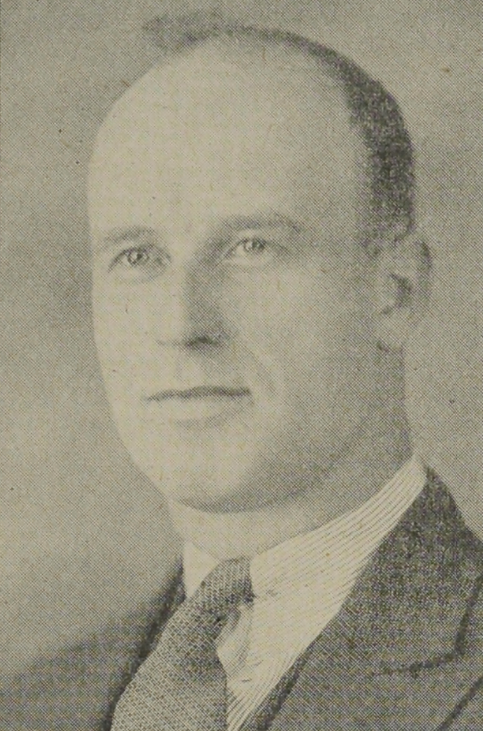
- Keay, pictured in a 1944 newspaper

Member of the Legislative Assembly of New Brunswick
- In office 1935–1948
- Constituency: Charlotte

Personal details
- Born: August 9, 1900 St. Andrews, New Brunswick
- Died: July 1, 1963 (aged 62) St. Stephen, New Brunswick
- Party: New Brunswick Liberal Association
- Spouse: Edythe Margaret Mitchell
- Children: 1
- Occupation: merchant

Richard Fraser Keay (August 9, 1900 – July 1, 1963) was a Canadian politician. He served in the Legislative Assembly of New Brunswick as member of the Liberal party from 1935 to 1948.
