= Henry I. Taylor =

Canadian politician (1862–1943)

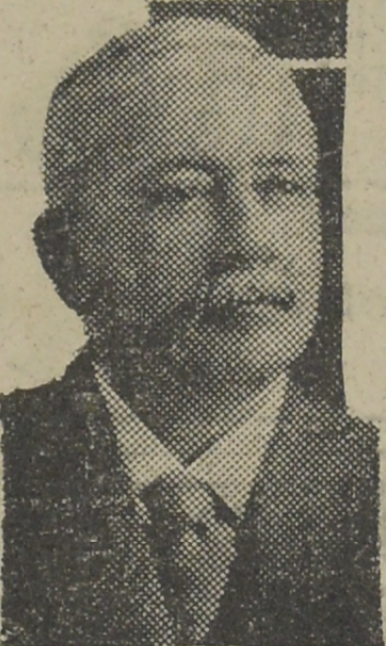
- Taylor, pictured in a 1935 newspaper

Member of the Legislative Assembly of New Brunswick
- In office 1908–1935
- Constituency: Charlotte

Personal details
- Born: July 28, 1862 Saint John, New Brunswick
- Died: April 10, 1943 (aged 80) St. George, New Brunswick
- Party: Conservative Party of New Brunswick
- Occupation: physician

Henry I. Taylor (July 28, 1862 – April 10, 1943) was a Canadian politician. He served in the Legislative Assembly of New Brunswick as member of the Conservative party representing Charlotte County from 1908 to 1935. During his political career, he served as the Health and Labour Minister.
