= St. Stephen-Milltown (electoral district) =

Defunct provincial electoral district in New Brunswick, Canada

New Brunswick electoral district

Defunct provincial electoral district
- Legislature: Legislative Assembly of New Brunswick
- District created: 1973
- District abolished: 1994
- First contested: 1974
- Last contested: 1991

St. Stephen-Milltown was a provincial electoral district in New Brunswick, Canada. It was created from the multi-member riding of Charlotte in the 1973 electoral redistribution, and was abolished in the 1994 electoral redistribution. This riding was briefly separated from the multi-member riding of Charlotte from 1924 until 1926.

== Members of the Legislative Assembly ==
Assembly	Years	Member	Party
Riding created from Charlotte
36th	1925–1926†	John M. Flewelling	Conservative
36th	1926–1930	Arthur R. MacKenzie	Conservative
Riding dissolved into Charlotte
Riding re-created from Charlotte
48th	1974–1978	Bill Cockburn	Progressive Conservative
49th	1978–1982	Bill Cockburn	Progressive Conservative
50th	1982–1987	Bob Jackson	Progressive Conservative
51st	1987–1991	Ann Breault	Liberal
52nd	1991–1995	Ann Breault	Liberal
Riding dissolved into Western Charlotte

== Election results ==
=== 1973–1994 ===
1991 New Brunswick general election
Party	Candidate	Votes	%	±%
Liberal	Ann Breault	1,820	47.14	-2.61
Progressive Conservative	Ken Stevens	1,129	29.24	-17.31
Confederation of Regions	Robert Michael Booth	798	20.67	–
New Democratic	Irene Tobin	114	2.95	-0.25
Total valid votes		3,861	100.0	
Liberal hold		Swing		+7.35

1987 New Brunswick general election
Party	Candidate	Votes	%	±%
Liberal	Ann Breault	2,054	49.75	+13.36
Progressive Conservative	Bob Jackson	1,922	46.55	-10.61
New Democratic	Rick MacMillan	132	3.20	-3.25
Independent	C. Ronald Campbell	21	0.51	–
Total valid votes		4,129	100.0	
Liberal gain from Progressive Conservative		Swing		+11.98

1982 New Brunswick general election
Party	Candidate	Votes	%	±%
Progressive Conservative	Bob Jackson	2,155	57.16	-1.95
Liberal	Joel Hansen	1,372	36.39	-0.46
New Democratic	Judy Olsen	243	6.45	+2.40
Total valid votes		3,770	100.0	
Progressive Conservative hold		Swing		-0.74

1978 New Brunswick general election
Party	Candidate	Votes	%	±%
Progressive Conservative	Bill Cockburn	1,986	59.11	-3.16
Liberal	Sydney Holmes	1,238	36.85	-0.88
New Democratic	Charles Roland Campbell	136	4.05	–
Total valid votes		3,360	100.0	
Progressive Conservative hold		Swing		-1.14

1974 New Brunswick general election
Party	Candidate	Votes	%
Progressive Conservative	Bill Cockburn	2,179	62.27
Liberal	Bill Waycott	1,320	37.73
Total valid votes		3,499	100.0
The previous multi-member riding of Charlotte went totally Progressive Conservative in the last election, with Bill Cockburn being one of four incumbents.

== See also ==
- List of New Brunswick provincial electoral districts
- Canadian provincial electoral districts
