= J. Arthur Moore =

Canadian politician

Arthur Moore
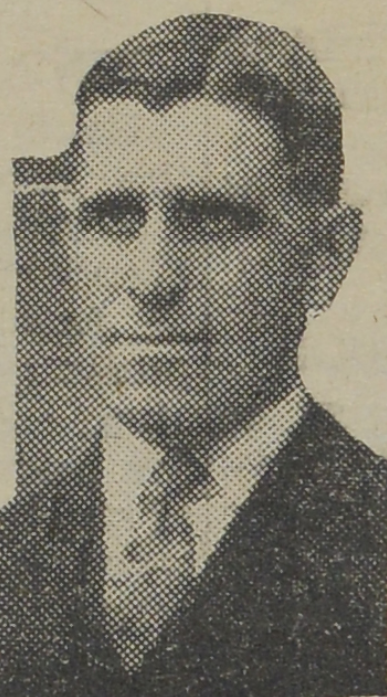
- Moore, pictured in a 1935 newspaper

Member of the Legislative Assembly of New Brunswick
- In office 1952–1967
- In office 1939–1944
- In office 1925–1935
- Constituency: Queens

Personal details
- Born: October 17, 1891 Scotchtown, New Brunswick
- Died: October 20, 1979 (aged 88)
- Party: Progressive Conservative Party of New Brunswick
- Spouse: Maude Mayes
- Occupation: merchant

J. Arthur Moore (October 17, 1891 – December 20, 1979) was a lumberman, farmer and political figure in New Brunswick, Canada. He represented Queen's County in the Legislative Assembly of New Brunswick from 1925 to 1935, from 1939 to 1944 and from 1952 to 1967.

He was born in Scotchtown, New Brunswick, the son of David Powers and Martha Olmstead. In 1917, he married Maude Mayes. He was defeated in a bid for reelection in 1935. Moore served as speaker for the provincial assembly from 1955 to 1960. He died in 1979.
