= William Neil Campbell =

Canadian politician (1885–1979)

Member of the Legislative Assembly of New Brunswick
- In office 1950–1952
- Constituency: Charlotte

Personal details
- Born: June 14, 1885 St. George, New Brunswick
- Died: July 28, 1979 (aged 94) St. Andrews, New Brunswick
- Party: New Brunswick Liberal Association
- Spouse: Pearl Dick
- Occupation: fisherman

William Neil Campbell (June 14, 1885 – July 28, 1979) was a Canadian politician. He is the son of the Daniel and Eliza Lydie (Mann) Campbell. He served in the Legislative Assembly of New Brunswick as member of the Liberal party from 1950 to 1952. He came to office in the January 9, 1950 by-election in Charlotte as a result of James Joseph Hayes Doone resignation. He is buried in the St. George Rural Cemetery.
