= Walter S. Butler =

Canadian politician

Walter Scott Butler (July 22, 1823 – May 3, 1913) was a political figure in New Brunswick. He represented Queen's County in the Legislative Assembly of New Brunswick from 1867 to 1870 and from 1872 to 1882.

He was born and educated at Grand Lake in Queen's County, the son of James Butler, the son of an Irish immigrant, and Mary Smith, the daughter of a United Empire Loyalist. In 1854, he married Janet Anne Sowers. He was a justice of the peace. Butler was elected to the legislative assembly in an 1867 by-election held after John Ferris was elected to the House of Commons. He was defeated in the 1870 general election but elected in an 1872 by-election held after Gideon D. Bailey resigned his seat.
