= Alfred Hawkins =

Canadian politician

Member of the Legislative Assembly of New Brunswick
- In office 1960–1967
- Constituency: Charlotte

Personal details
- Born: August 6, 1906 Pennfield Ridge, New Brunswick
- Died: 1981 (aged 74–75) Pennfield, New Brunswick
- Party: New Brunswick Liberal Association
- Spouse: Mildred Frances Stuart
- Children: 4
- Occupation: Electrical and Refrigeration Sales and Serviceman

Alfred Howard Hawkins (August 6, 1906 – 1981) was a Canadian politician. He served in the Legislative Assembly of New Brunswick from 1960 to 1967 as member of the Liberal party.
