= Arthur Skaling =

Canadian politician

Arthur E. Skaling (September 9, 1891 – May 24, 1960) was a masonry contract foreman and political figure in New Brunswick, Canada. He represented the City of St. John in the Legislative Assembly of New Brunswick as a Progressive Conservative member from 1952 to 1960.

He was born in Cambridge, Nova Scotia, the son of Joseph F. Skaling and Margaret B. McLean. In 1912, he married Belle L. Brown. Skaling served on the city council for Saint John from 1940 to 1944 and was also a school trustee. He served in the province's Executive Council as Minister of Labour from 1952 to 1960.
