= James S. Lord =

Canadian politician

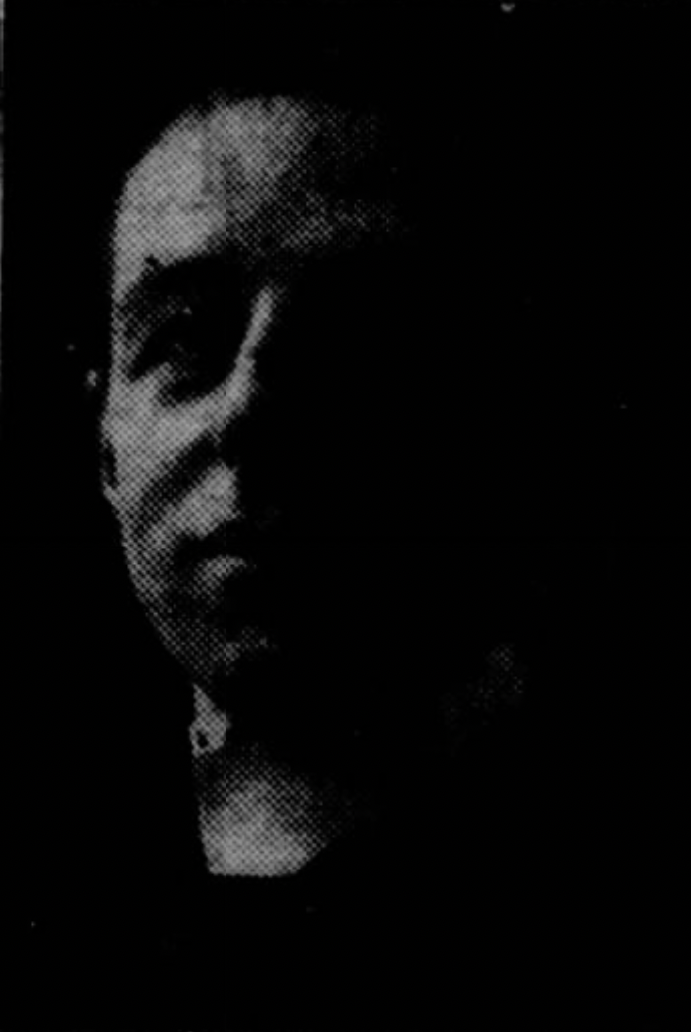

Member of the Legislative Assembly of New Brunswick
- In office 1925–1930
- Constituency: Charlotte

Personal details
- Born: December 25, 1875 Lord's Cove, Deer Island, New Brunswick
- Died: July 8, 1932 (aged 56) Lord's Cove, Deer Island, New Brunswick
- Party: Conservative Party of New Brunswick
- Occupation: insurance agent

James Simpson Lord (December 21, 1875 – July 8, 1932) was a Canadian politician. He served in the Legislative Assembly of New Brunswick as member of the Conservative party representing Charlotte County from 1925 to 1930.

In 1903, Lord became a provisional director of the West Isles Telephone Company on Deer Island along with Frederic Richardson, Edwin McNeil, Wilford Randall and Dr. Alexander Murray.

In 1908, Lord was working as a school teacher in Richardson, Deer Island. He went on to work as a school teacher in Saint John, then became general agent for Canada Life Insurance Company in Charlotte County. In 1916, he resigned from his role as chief bookkeeper for Ganong Bros. chocolate.

Lord was a member of the Knights of Pythias.

Lord served as scribe, and later Vice President (Imperial Klaliff), of the Ku Klux Klan of Kanada. Lord attended a 1927 KKK recruitment rally in Sarnia, Ontario where he stated "We must have an Anglo-Saxon Canada".
