= Leigh Williamson =

Canadian politician

Member of the Legislative Assembly of New Brunswick
- In office 1948–1952
- Constituency: Charlotte

Personal details
- Born: May 11, 1909 St. Andrews, New Brunswick
- Died: December 3, 1969 (aged 60) Treasure Island, Florida, U.S.
- Party: New Brunswick Liberal Association
- Spouse: Alice Conley
- Children: 2
- Occupation: businessman

William Leigh Williamson (May 11, 1909 – December 3, 1969) was a Canadian politician. He served in the Legislative Assembly of New Brunswick as member of the Liberal party from 1948 to 1952.
