= Fred E. Soucy =

Canadian politician (1922–1993)

Member of the Legislative Assembly of New Brunswick
- In office 1963–1967
- Constituency: Madawaska

Personal details
- Born: February 13, 1922 Green River, New Brunswick, Canada
- Died: October 3, 1993 (aged 71) Saint-Hyacinthe, Quebec, Canada
- Party: New Brunswick Liberal Association
- Spouse: Corinne Clavet
- Children: 4
- Occupation: train dispatcher

Frederick Enoil Soucy (February 13, 1922 – October 3, 1993) was a Canadian politician. He served in the Legislative Assembly of New Brunswick from 1963 to 1967 as a Liberal member from the constituency of Madawaska. He died in Saint-Hyacinthe, Quebec on October 3, 1993, at the age of 71.
