= Kathy Bockus =

Canadian politician

Kathy Bockus MLA
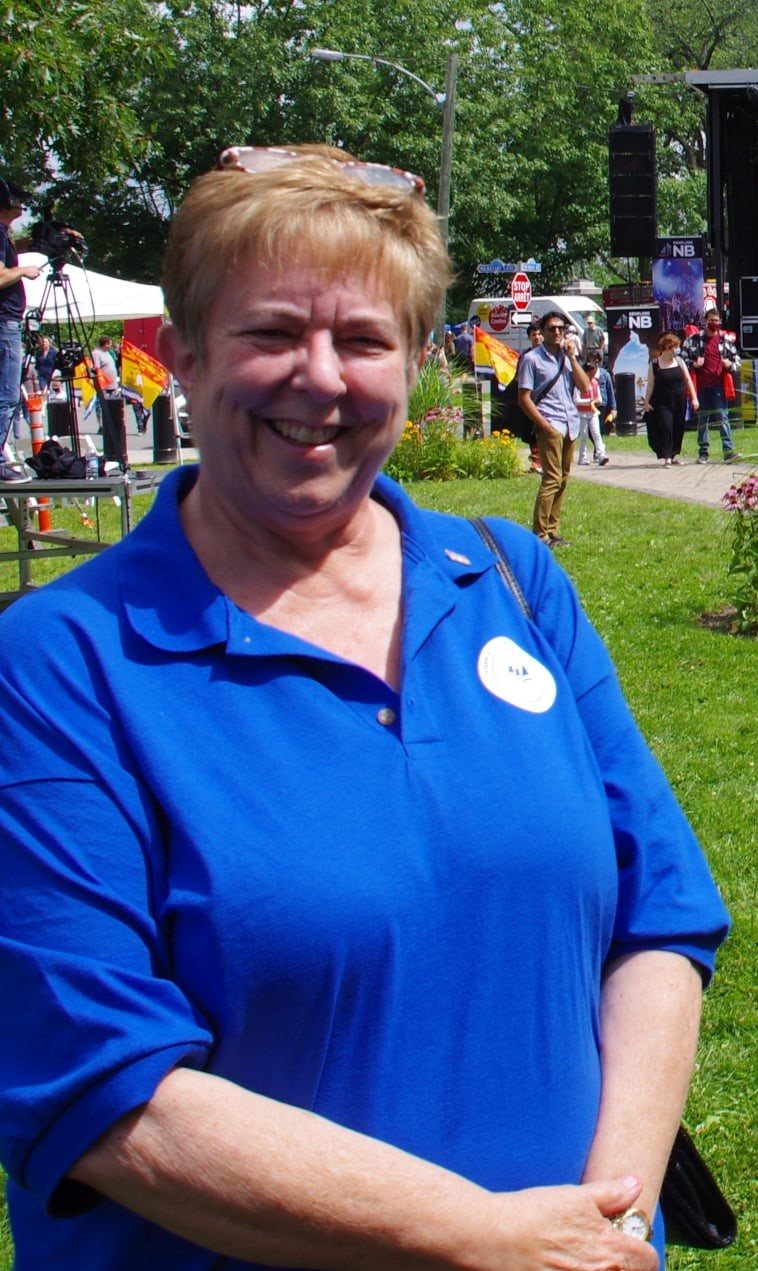

Minister responsible for Seniors
- In office June 27, 2023 – November 2, 2024
- Preceded by: Dorothy Shephard
- Succeeded by: Lyne Chantal Boudreau

Member of the New Brunswick Legislative Assembly for Saint Croix
- Incumbent
- Assumed office September 14, 2020
- Preceded by: Greg Thompson

Personal details
- Party: Progressive Conservative

Kathy Bockus is a Canadian politician, who was elected to the Legislative Assembly of New Brunswick in the 2020 provincial election. She represents the electoral district of Saint Croix as a member of the Progressive Conservatives. Bockus was Minister responsible for Seniors in the cabinet of Blaine Higgs from 2023 until 2024.

Bockus was re-elected in 2024.

== Electoral record ==
=== Saint Croix ===
2024 New Brunswick general election: Saint Croix
Party	Candidate	Votes	%	±%
Progressive Conservative	Kathy Bockus	3,271	45.34	+0.5
Liberal	Troy Lyons	2,063	28.60	+23.5
Green	Mark Groleau	1,442	19.99	+4.1
Independent	Kris Booth	170	2.36	-
People's Alliance	Alex Tessmann	96	1.33	-29.9
New Democratic	Bola Ademolu	90	1.25	-0.7
Libertarian	Krysten Mitchell	82	1.14	-
Total valid votes		7,214	99.85	
Total rejected ballots		11	0.15	
Turnout		7,225	-	
Eligible voters		-		
Progressive Conservative hold		Swing		-11.5
Source: Elections New Brunswick

2024 New Brunswick general election
Party	Candidate	Votes	%	±%
Progressive Conservative	Kathy Bockus	3,271	45.34	+0.16
Liberal	Troy Lyons	2,063	28.60	+23.53
Green	Mark Groleau	1,442	19.99	+4.32
Independent	Kris Booth	170	2.36	-
People's Alliance	Alex Tessmann	96	1.33	-30.89
New Democratic	Bola Ademolu	90	1.25	-0.61
Libertarian	Krysten Mitchell	82	1.14	-
Total valid votes		7,214	99.85	
Total rejected ballots		11	0.15	
Turnout		7,225	-	
Eligible voters		-		
Progressive Conservative hold		Swing		-11.69
Source: Elections New Brunswick

2020 New Brunswick general election
Party	Candidate	Votes	%	±%
Progressive Conservative	Kathy Bockus	3,570	45.18	+5.97
People's Alliance	Rod Cumberland	2,546	32.22	+14.53
Green	Kim Reeder	1,238	15.67	+3.04
Liberal	John Wayne Gardner	401	5.07	-24.33
New Democratic	Brad McKinney	147	1.86	+0.79
Total valid votes		7,902	100.0	
Total rejected ballots		19	0.24	
Turnout		7,921	66.09	
Eligible voters		11,985		
Progressive Conservative hold		Swing		-4.28
Source: Elections New Brunswick
