= Leon G. Small =

Canadian politician (1903–1979)

Member of the Legislative Assembly of New Brunswick
- In office 1960–1967
- Constituency: Charlotte

Personal details
- Born: June 24, 1903 Grand Manan, New Brunswick
- Died: November 7, 1979 (aged 76) Grand Manan, New Brunswick
- Party: New Brunswick Liberal Association
- Spouse: Marjorie E. Tatton
- Children: 2
- Occupation: automobile dealer

Leon Godfrey Small (June 24, 1903 – November 7, 1979) was a Canadian politician. He served in the Legislative Assembly of New Brunswick from 1960 to 1967 as member of the Liberal party.
