= John M. Flewelling =

Canadian politician

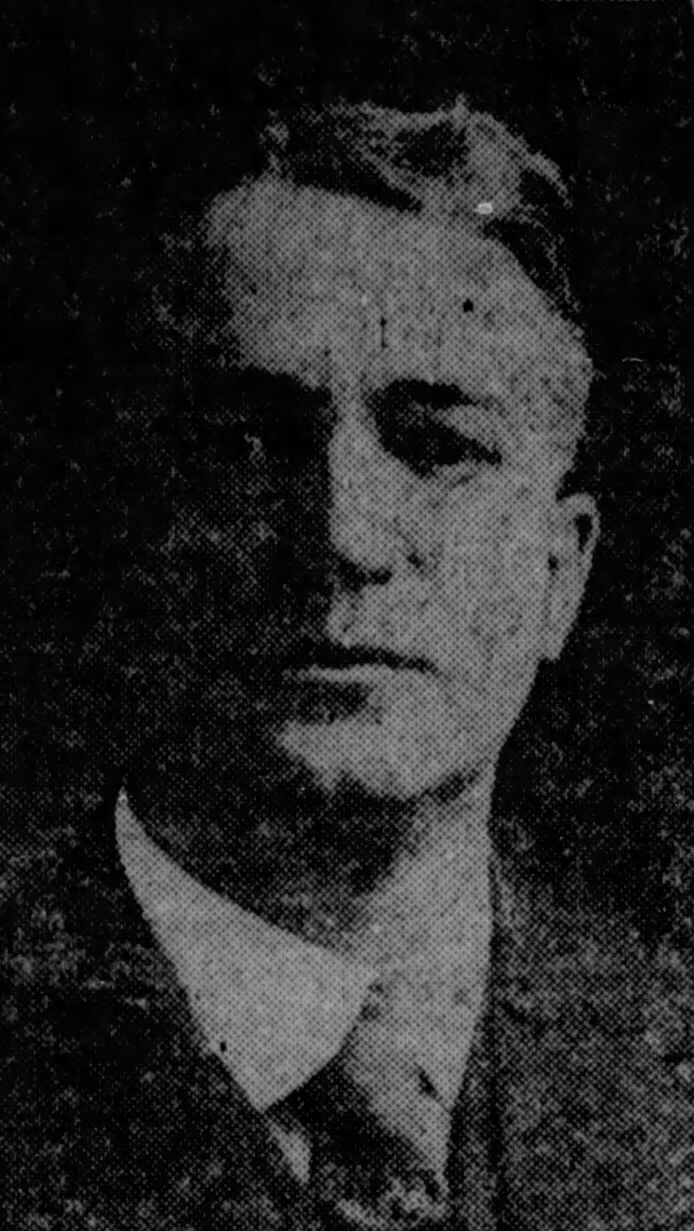

Member of the Legislative Assembly of New Brunswick
- In office 1925
- Constituency: St. Stephen-Milltown

Personal details
- Born: June 28, 1879 Woodstock, New Brunswick
- Died: October 31, 1925 (aged 46) Montreal, Quebec
- Party: Conservative Party of New Brunswick
- Spouse: Sarah J. MacVay
- Children: three
- Occupation: Insurance, real estate broker

John Medley Flewelling (June 28, 1879 – October 31, 1925) was a Canadian politician. He served in the Legislative Assembly of New Brunswick as member of the Conservative party representing Charlotte County from 1921 to 1925 and St. Stephen-Milltown from 1925 until his death later that year.
