= James E. Lynott =

Canadian politician

James Edward Lynott (June 26, 1839 – January 7, 1890) was a political figure in New Brunswick. He represented Charlotte County in the Legislative Assembly of New Brunswick from 1878 to 1886.

He was born in St. George, New Brunswick, the son of Edward Lynott and Mary Leddy, both natives of Ireland, and educated at the St. George Public School. Lynott was appointed as a Justice of the Peace in 1855. In 1863, he married Kathleen A. Sullivan. He served as secretary for the Grand Southern Railway Company, secretary for the school board at St. George and councillor for Charlotte County. He ran unsuccessfully for a seat in the provincial assembly in 1870, but was elected in 1878 and re-elected in 1882. He was Speaker for the provincial assembly from 1883 to 1886. He died in 1890.
