= Docithe Nadeau =

Canadian politician

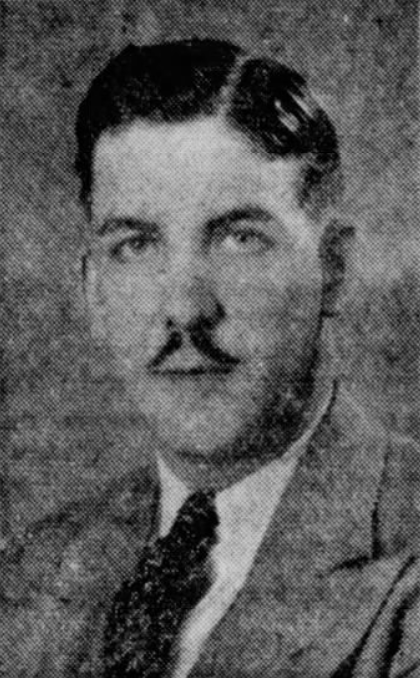
Nadeau, pictured in a 1948 newspaper

Docithe Nadeau (1910 – 1986) was a farmer, manufacturer and political figure in New Brunswick, Canada. He represented Madawaska County in the Legislative Assembly of New Brunswick from 1948 to 1952 as a Liberal member.

He was born in Saint-François, New Brunswick, the son of Émile Nadeau and Élisabeth Michaud. He studied in Saint-Basile and Sainte-Anne-de-la-Pocatière, Quebec before settling on the family farm. Nadeau married Irène Daigle. He helped found the local Caisse Populaire. With his cousin Albert Nadeau, Nadeau established a company which built furniture.
