= Saint-François, New Brunswick =

Coordinates: 47.245019°N 68.702826°W

Saint-François is an unincorporated community in New Brunswick, Canada. It is officially recognized as a designated place by Statistics Canada.

== Demographics ==
In the 2021 Census of Population conducted by Statistics Canada, Saint-François had a population of 468 living in 245 of its 250 total private dwellings, a change of -0.4% from its 2016 population of 470. With a land area of 6.17 km^{2} (2.38 sq mi), it had a population density of 75.9/km^{2} (196.5/sq mi) in 2021.

== See also ==
- List of communities in New Brunswick
