= Mathias Nadeau =

Canadian politician

Mathias Nadeau (February 21, 1838 – February 6, 1919) was a farmer, merchant and political figure in New Brunswick, Canada. He represented Madawaska County in the Legislative Assembly of New Brunswick as a Conservative member from 1882 to 1886.

He was born in Saint-Hilaire, New Brunswick and educated at Sainte Anne's College. In 1862, he married Adelaide Saucier. Nadeau was a justice of the peace and served on the county council for six years. He was elected in an 1882 by-election held after P. Lynott resigned his seat.
