= James N. Tucker Jr. =

Canadian politician

James "Jimmy" N. Tucker Jr. (born November 1, 1934) was an educator and political figure in New Brunswick, Canada. He represented Charlotte County and then Charlotte-Fundy in the Legislative Assembly of New Brunswick from 1972 to 1987 as a Progressive Conservative member.

He was born in L'Etete, New Brunswick, the son of James N. Tucker, and educated at the University of New Brunswick and the University of Bridgeport. Tucker was a teacher, guidance counsellor and Junior high school principal. In 1958, he married Anna Mae Hooper. Tucker was first elected in a 1972 by-election held after the death of John Rigby. He served as speaker for the provincial assembly from 1981 to 1985. Tucker was named Minister of Fisheries in 1985. He was defeated by Eric Allaby when he ran for reelection in 1987.
