= William Swim =

Canadian politician

William Swim (June 24, 1824 – December 19, 1910) was a lumberman and political figure in New Brunswick. He represented Northumberland in the Legislative Assembly of New Brunswick from 1874 to 1878.

He was born in Northumberland County, New Brunswick, the son of Henry Swim and Agnes Doak, and was educated in Doaktown. Swim married in Caroline Amos in 1849. He was defeated when he ran for reelection to the assembly in 1878. Swim died in Doaktown at the age of 86.

His son Frank (Francis) also served in the New Brunswick assembly.
