= Archibald McKenzie =

Canadian politician

Archibald McKenzie (May 29, 1841 – ?) was a political figure in New Brunswick. He represented Restigouche County in the Legislative Assembly of New Brunswick from 1875 to 1878.

He was born at the Flatlands, Restigouche County, New Brunswick, the son of immigrants from the Scottish Isle of Arran, and educated at Campbellton. McKenzie ran unsuccessfully for a seat in the House of Commons in 1872. He served as chairman for the board of school trustees. McKenzie married Megan Wise from Silloth. He also served as customs collector.

His son Archibald Ernest Graham McKenzie was a lawyer and teacher who commanded an infantry battalion from New Brunswick during World War I.
