= Gladstone W. Perry =

Canadian politician

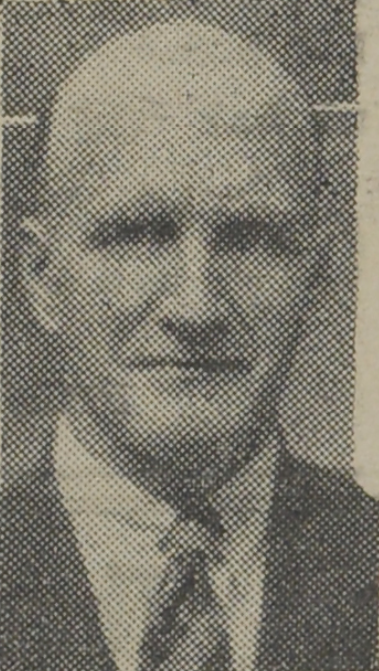
- Perry, pictured in a 1935 newspaper

Member of the Legislative Assembly of New Brunswick
- In office 1931–1952
- Constituency: Carleton

Personal details
- Born: April 3, 1880 Havelock, New Brunswick
- Died: October 2, 1967 (aged 87) Grand Falls, New Brunswick
- Party: Progressive Conservative Party of New Brunswick
- Spouse: Alice Grant
- Children: 4
- Occupation: farmer

Gladstone William Perry (April 3, 1880 – October 2, 1967) was a Canadian politician. He served in the Legislative Assembly of New Brunswick as member of the Progressive Conservative party from 1931 to 1952.
