= Thomas Cottrell =

Canadian politician

MLA for Charlotte County
- In office 1874 to 1882

Personal details
- Born: August 10, 1815 Saint David, New Brunswick
- Died: March 24, 1907 (aged 91) Eureka, California
- Party: Liberal Party of New Brunswick

Thomas Cottrell (August 10, 1815 – March 24, 1907) was a political figure in New Brunswick. He represented Charlotte County in the Legislative Assembly of New Brunswick from 1874 to 1882 as a Liberal member.

He was born in Saint David, New Brunswick and educated there. In 1836, he married Annie Wyman. Cottrell was a captain in the local militia. He died in 1907 in Eureka, California.
