= Gideon D. Bailey =

Canadian politician

Gideon Dore Bailey (February 25, 1819 – May 20, 1879) was a farmer and political figure in New Brunswick. He represented Queen's County in the Legislative Assembly of New Brunswick from 1865 to 1866 and from 1870 to 1872.

He was born in Sunbury County, New Brunswick. In 1848, he married Hannah Branscombe. He was a justice of the peace and lieutenant colonel in the county militia. Bailey was also president of the Agricultural Society. He resigned his seat in the assembly in 1872 after he was named to the Legislative Council; he remained a member of the council until his death at the age of 60.
