= Lévite Thériault =

Canadian politician

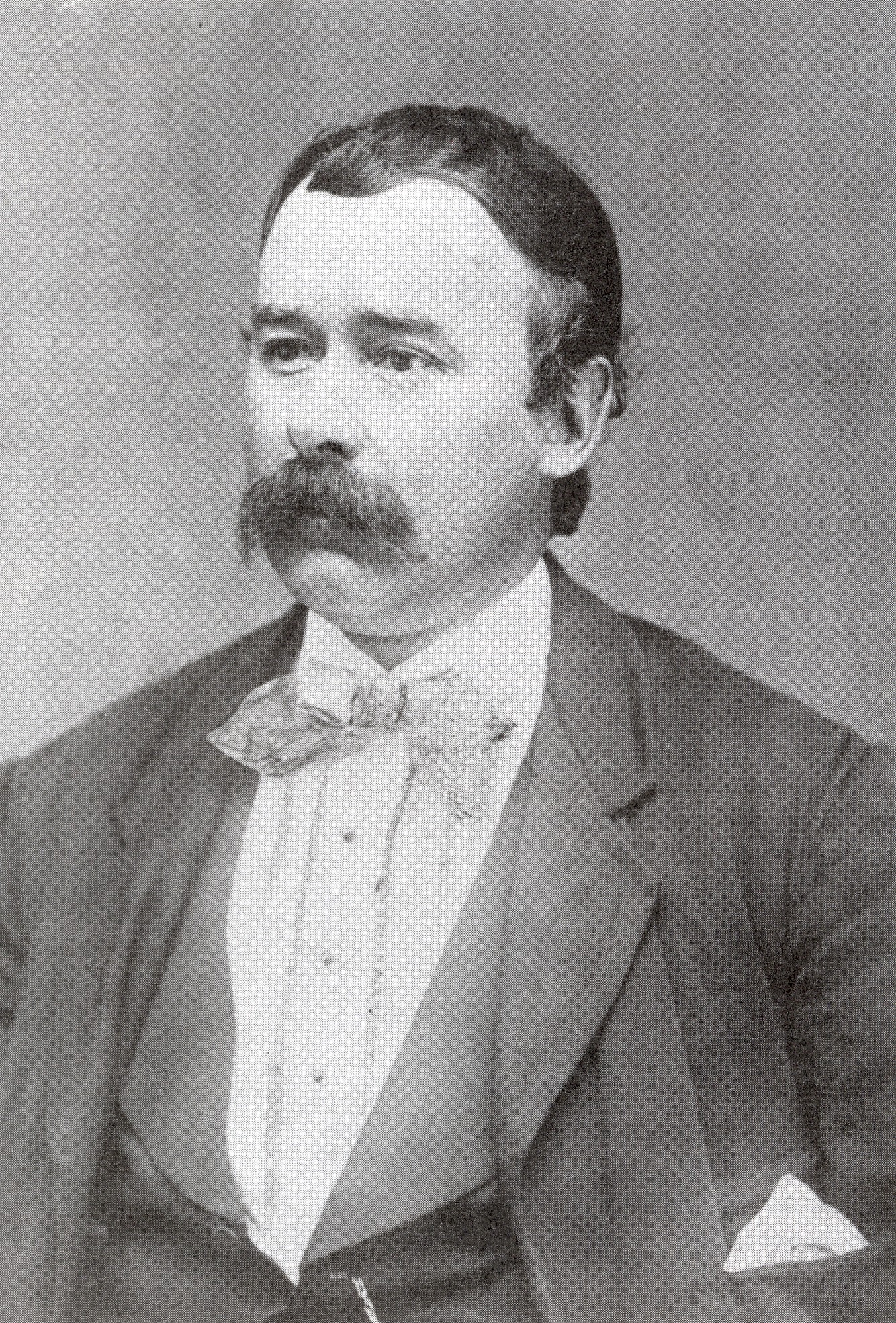
Lévite Thériault

Lévite Thériault (May 14, 1837 – December 2, 1896) was a land owner and political figure in New Brunswick. He represented Victoria County from 1868 to 1874 and Madawaska County from 1874 to 1882 and from 1886 to 1894 in the Legislative Assembly of New Brunswick.

Of Acadian descent, he was born in Saint-Basile, New Brunswick, the son of François-Régis Thériault and Julie Ringuet, and studied at the Collège de Sainte-Anne-de-la-Pocatière in Lower Canada. Thériault was a school trustee and later was named a justice of the peace. He also served as a lieutenant in the local militia. He was the founder and lieutenant-colonel of the 1st Battalion of Madawaska militia. He was first elected to the legislative assembly in an 1868 by-election held after the death of Vital Hébert. Unlike other Acadians, he supported the Common Schools Act of 1871. Later that year, he was named to the Executive Council as a minister without portfolio. In 1875, he married Eugénie Lebel. He married Marie-Luce-Eugénie Patry in 1878 after the death of his first wife and moved to Fraserville (later Rivière-du-Loup) for a few years. After his reelection in 1886, Thériault resigned his seat in 1887 to unsuccessfully contest a seat in the House of Commons. He then ran successfully for his former seat in the provincial assembly. After he retired from politics, he served as registrar for Madawaska County. He died at Grand-Ruisseau in Madawaska County at the age of 59.
