= Samuel Mooers =

Canadian politician (1889–1975)

Samuel E. Mooers

Member of the Legislative Assembly of New Brunswick
- In office 1939–1952
- Constituency: Restigouche

Personal details
- Born: December 14, 1889 Woodstock, New Brunswick
- Died: May 5, 1975 (aged 85) Scarborough, Ontario
- Party: New Brunswick Liberal Association
- Spouse: Flovetha P. Goss
- Children: 4
- Occupation: Machinist, C.N.R.

Samuel Edward Mooers (December 14, 1889 – May 5, 1975) was a Canadian politician. He served in the Legislative Assembly of New Brunswick as member of the Liberal party from 1939 to 1952.
