= Vernon R. Briggs =

Canadian politician

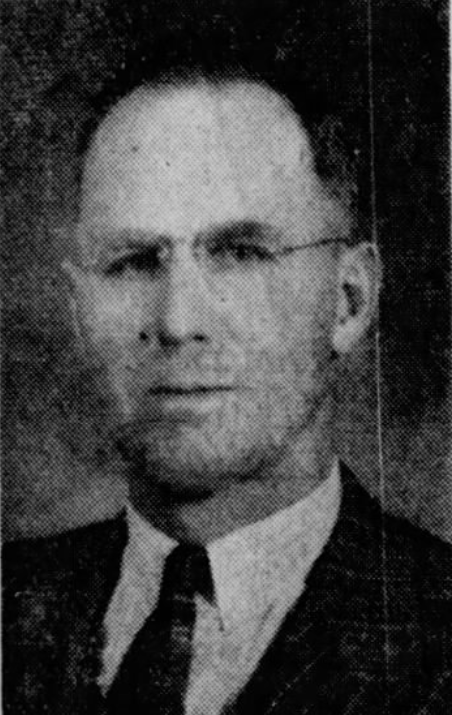
- Briggs, pictured in a 1948 newspaper

Member of the Legislative Assembly of New Brunswick
- In office 1945–1952
- Constituency: Victoria

Personal details
- Born: February 28, 1899 North View, New Brunswick
- Died: June 1, 1970 (aged 71)
- Party: New Brunswick Liberal Association
- Spouse: M. L. Yeomans
- Occupation: farmer

Vernon Ralph Briggs (February 28, 1899 – June 1, 1970) was a Canadian politician. He served in the Legislative Assembly of New Brunswick as member of the Liberal party from 1945 to 1952.
