= Elmor T. Kennedy =

Canadian politician

Elmor Tilley Kennedy (19 December 1885 – 15 July 1953) was a physician, surgeon and political figure in the Province of New Brunswick, Canada. He represented King's County in the Legislative Assembly of New Brunswick from 1939 to 1953 as a Conservative and then Progressive Conservative member.

He was born in Youngs Cove, New Brunswick the son of William E. Kennedy and Mary A. Gale. Kennedy was educated at the University of New Brunswick and the Chicago Medical School. He served in the Canadian Expeditionary Force in World War I as a medical officer. In 1922, Kennedy married Marjorie Roach. He was mayor of Sussex. Kennedy was named speaker for the provincial assembly in 1953 but died in office later that year.
