= Armand Richard =

Canadian politician

Member of the Legislative Assembly of New Brunswick
- In office 1944–1952
- Constituency: Kent

Personal details
- Born: April 14, 1895 Acadieville, New Brunswick
- Died: March 30, 1982 (aged 86) Moncton, New Brunswick
- Party: New Brunswick Liberal Association
- Spouse: Emma Pineau
- Children: 6
- Occupation: farmer

Armand Richard (April 14, 1895 – March 30, 1982) was a Canadian politician. He served in the Legislative Assembly of New Brunswick as member of the Liberal party from 1944 to 1952.
