= Harry C. Greenlaw =

Canadian politician

Member of the Legislative Assembly of New Brunswick
- In office 1944–1952
- Constituency: York

Personal details
- Born: August 22, 1895 Millville, New Brunswick
- Died: October 23, 1963 (aged 68) Millville, New Brunswick
- Party: New Brunswick Liberal Association
- Spouse: Winnifred Clark
- Occupation: farmer, produce dealer and exporter

Harry Cromwell Greenlaw (August 22, 1895 – October 23, 1963) was a Canadian politician. He served in the Legislative Assembly of New Brunswick as member of the Liberal party from 1944 to 1952.
