= John Woods (Canadian politician) =

Canadian politician

Member of the Legislative Assembly of New Brunswick
- In office 1944–1952
- Constituency: Kings

Personal details
- Born: February 20, 1876 Welsford, New Brunswick
- Died: June 15, 1957 (aged 81) Sussex, New Brunswick
- Party: Progressive Conservative Party of New Brunswick
- Spouse: Annie L. Floyd
- Occupation: farmer

John Woods (February 20, 1876 – June 15, 1957) was a Canadian politician. He served in the Legislative Assembly of New Brunswick as member of the Progressive Conservative party from 1944 to 1952.
