= 1874 New Brunswick general election =

Canadian provincial election

The 1874 New Brunswick general election was held in May and June 1874, to elect 41 members to the 23rd New Brunswick Legislative Assembly, the governing house of the province of New Brunswick, Canada. The election was held before the adoption of party labels.

Of forty-one MLAs, thirty-five supported the government, five formed the opposition, and one was neutral.

The main issue in the election was the Common Schools Act passed in 1871. Roman Catholics and Acadians, in particular, were opposed to the legislation because it banned religious instruction in publicly funded schools. In the 1874 election, support for the government implied support for the Common Schools Act.

New Brunswick general election, 1874
Party	Leader	Seats
Government	George Edwin King	35
Opposition		5
Neutral		1
