= Donald T. Cochrane =

Canadian politician

Donald Cochrane

Member of the Legislative Assembly of New Brunswick
- In office 1944–1952
- Constituency: York

Personal details
- Born: October 23, 1906 Marysville, New Brunswick
- Died: May 10, 1969 (aged 62) Halifax, Nova Scotia
- Party: New Brunswick Liberal Association
- Spouse: Hazel D. Saunders
- Children: 3
- Occupation: union leader

Donald Theodore Cochrane (October 23, 1906 – May 10, 1969) was a Canadian politician. He served in the Legislative Assembly of New Brunswick as member of the Liberal party from 1944 to 1952.
