= A. Russell Colpitts =

Canadian politician

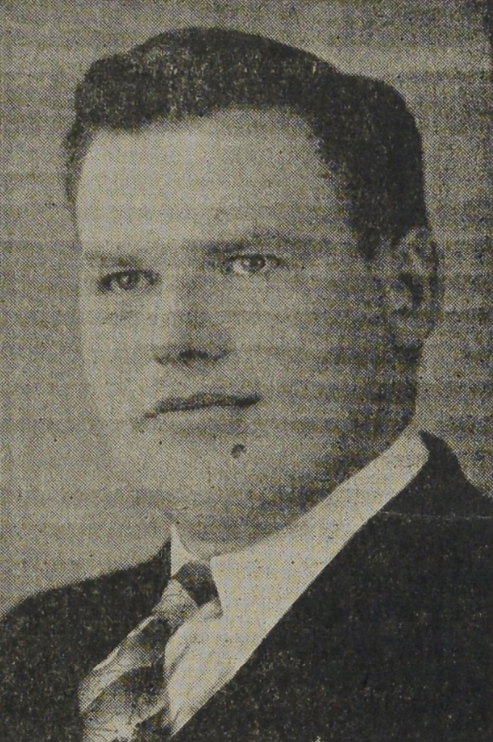
- Colpitts, pictured in a 1947 newspaper

Member of the Legislative Assembly of New Brunswick
- In office 1939–1952
- Preceded by: Harry O. Downey
- Succeeded by: Claude D. Taylor
- Constituency: Albert

Personal details
- Born: Arthur Russell Colpitts; September 1, 1907 Colpitts Settlement, Albert County, New Brunswick
- Died: February 11, 1976 (aged 69) Moncton, New Brunswick
- Party: New Brunswick Liberal Association
- Spouse: Geraldine A. Fulton (m. 1927)
- Children: 8

Arthur Russell Colpitts (September 7, 1906 – February 11, 1976) was a farmer and political figure in New Brunswick, Canada. He represented Albert in the Legislative Assembly of New Brunswick as a Liberal member from 1939 to 1952.

He was born in Colpitts Settlement, New Brunswick, the son of Samuel B. Colpitts and Addie B. In 1927, he married Geraldine A. Fulton. Colpitts was also a fox rancher.
