= J. Hervé Proulx =

Canadian politician

J. Hervé Proulx (October 19, 1899 – April 7, 1960) was a merchant and political figure in New Brunswick, Canada. He represented Madawaska County in the Legislative Assembly of New Brunswick from 1944 to 1948 as a Liberal member.

He was born in Rivière-du-Loup, Quebec, the son of J. David Proulx, and was educated there and at Sainte-Anne-de-la-Pocatière and Sainte-Anne-de-Beaupré. In 1922, he married Marie-Anna Malenfant. In the same year, he moved to Edmundston, New Brunswick where he worked as a baker and a grocer. From 1936 to 1946, he was mayor of Edmundston.
