= Michael F. McCluskey =

Canadian politician

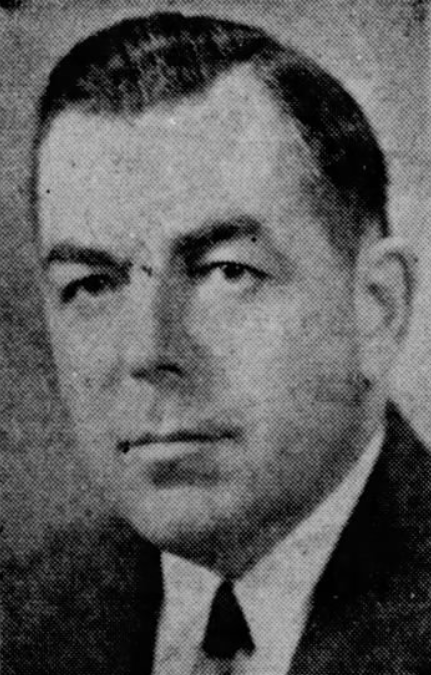
- McCluskey, pictured in a 1948 newspaper

Member of the Legislative Assembly of New Brunswick
- In office 1944–1952
- Constituency: Victoria

Personal details
- Born: April 30, 1899 Grand Falls, New Brunswick
- Died: 1977 (aged 77–78)
- Party: New Brunswick Liberal Association
- Spouse: Ester Marie Cyr
- Children: 3
- Occupation: businessman

Michael Francis McCluskey (April 30, 1899 – 1977) was a Canadian politician. He served in the Legislative Assembly of New Brunswick as member of the Liberal party from 1944 to 1952.
