= Harry O. Downey =

Canadian politician

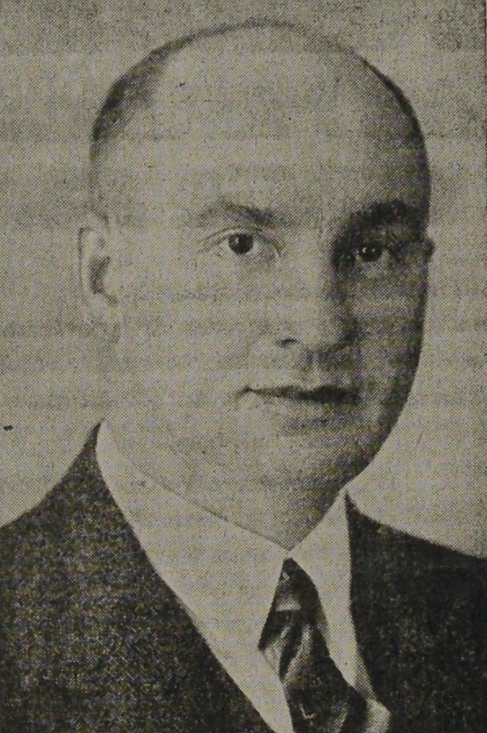
Downey in a 1947 newspaper

Harry Orliff Downey (May 9, 1897 – April 17, 1974) was a fox rancher and political figure in the Province of New Brunswick, Canada. He represented Albert in the Legislative Assembly of New Brunswick from 1931 to 1952 as a Liberal member.

He was born in Curryville, New Brunswick, the son of Oscar E. Downey and Rose E. Matthews. Downey was speaker for the provincial assembly from 1944 to 1952.

Legislative Assembly of New Brunswick
Preceded by Fred Colpitts	MLA for Albert; 1931-1952	Succeeded by A. Russell Colpitts
