= Hugh S. Balkam =

Canadian politician

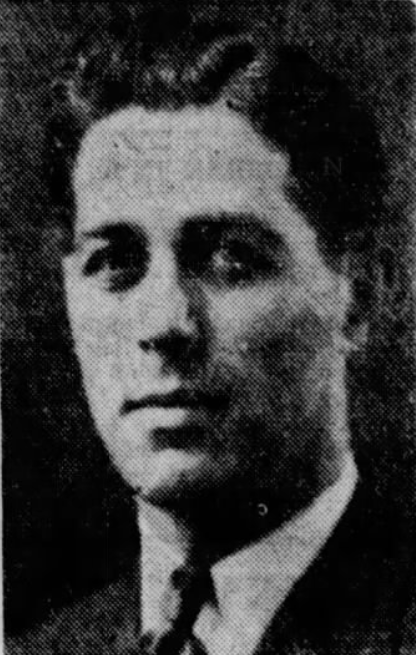
- Balkam, pictured in a 1948 newspaper

Member of the Legislative Assembly of New Brunswick
- In office 1944–1952
- Constituency: Charlotte

Personal details
- Born: February 15, 1918 Baltimore, Maryland, U.S.
- Died: January 21, 1978 (aged 59) Saint John, New Brunswick
- Party: New Brunswick Liberal Association
- Spouse: Yvonne
- Occupation: automobile dealer

Hugh Sadler Balkam (February 15, 1918 – January 21, 1978) was a Canadian politician. He served in the Legislative Assembly of New Brunswick as member of the Liberal party from 1944 to 1952.
