= Francis Woods =

Canadian politician

Francis Woods (January 27, 1822 – September 18, 1894) was a businessman and political figure in New Brunswick, Canada. He represented Queen's County in the Legislative Assembly of New Brunswick from 1874 to 1882 as a Liberal member.

He was born near Enniskillen in County Fermanagh, Ireland, the son of Anthony Woods, and moved to New Brunswick with his parents and grandparents around 1829. In 1852, he married Jane Elizabeth Armstrong. Woods was president of the Gagetown and Petersville Railway.
