= Gordon R. Lawson =

Canadian politician

Gordon Redvers Lawson (June 1, 1898 – October 27, 1954) was a dental surgeon and political figure in the Province of New Brunswick, Canada. He represented Sunbury County in the Legislative Assembly of New Brunswick from 1944 to 1952 as a Liberal member.

He was born in North Head on Grand Manan Island, the son of John James Lawson and Annie C. Upham, a direct descendant of Joshua Upham. Lawson was educated at the University of Toronto. In 1921, he married Leora Ryke Robinson. Lawson served as warden for Sunbury County from 1927 to 1931. He was a member of the Canadian Expeditionary Force during World War I.

His brother Walter C. Lawson also served in the provincial assembly.
