= H. C. Parker =

Canadian politician

Member of the Legislative Assembly of New Brunswick
- In office 1944–1952
- Constituency: Queens

Personal details
- Born: November 24, 1907 Bear River, Nova Scotia
- Died: January 27, 1968 (aged 60) Oromocto, New Brunswick
- Party: New Brunswick Liberal Association
- Spouse: Jessie Maie McCracken
- Children: 5
- Occupation: businessman

Hardie Clifford Parker (November 24, 1907 – January 27, 1968) was a Canadian politician. He served in the Legislative Assembly of New Brunswick as member of the Liberal party from 1944 to 1952.
