= James Murchie =

Canadian politician

James Murchie (August 16, 1813 – May 27, 1900) was a farmer, businessman and political figure in New Brunswick. He represented Charlotte County in the Legislative Assembly of New Brunswick from 1875 to 1878 as a Liberal Party member.

== Biography ==
He was born in St. Stephen, New Brunswick, the son of Daniel Murchie and Janet Campbell, both natives of Scotland. In 1836, he married Mary Ann Grimmer. Murchie farmed and was also involved in the lumber trade. In 1853, he acquired a sawmill at Milltown. He went on to acquire more mills, wharves and a fleet of ships. He married Margaret Jane Thorpe in 1860 after the death of his first wife. Murchie was a director for the St Stephen’s Bank, a vice-president of the New Brunswick and Canada Railroad and president of the St. Croix Lloyds Insurance Company. After serving one term in the provincial assembly, he did not run for reelection. Murchie helped establish the St. Croix Cotton Manufacturing Company and later served as its president. He died in Milltown at the age of 86.
