= Jean-Baptiste D'Astous =

Canadian politician

Member of the Legislative Assembly of New Brunswick
- In office 1945–1952
- Constituency: Restigouche

Personal details
- Born: March 19, 1904 Trois-Pistoles, Quebec
- Died: July 26, 1998 (aged 94) Bathurst, New Brunswick
- Party: New Brunswick Liberal Association
- Spouse: Laura Levesque
- Children: 3
- Occupation: carpenter

Jean-Baptiste D'Astous (March 19, 1904 – July 26, 1998) was a Canadian politician. He served in the Legislative Assembly of New Brunswick as member of the Liberal party from 1945 to 1952.
