= Edward S. Darrah =

Canadian politician

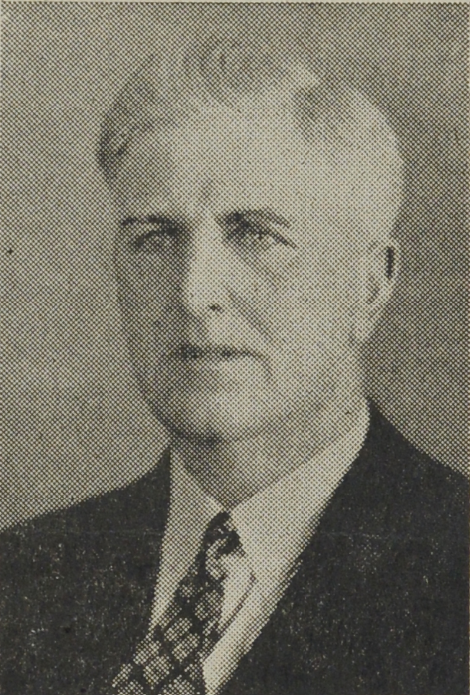

Member of the Legislative Assembly of New Brunswick
- In office 1944–1952
- Constituency: Queens

Personal details
- Born: June 14, 1885 Chipman, New Brunswick
- Died: 1975 (aged 82–83) New Brunswick
- Party: New Brunswick Liberal Association
- Spouse: Katherine Finley Gardiner
- Occupation: farmer

Edward Storyn Darrah (October 1, 1892 – 1975) was a Canadian politician. He served in the Legislative Assembly of New Brunswick as member of the Liberal party from 1944 to 1952.
