= Owen Morse (politician) =

Canadian politician

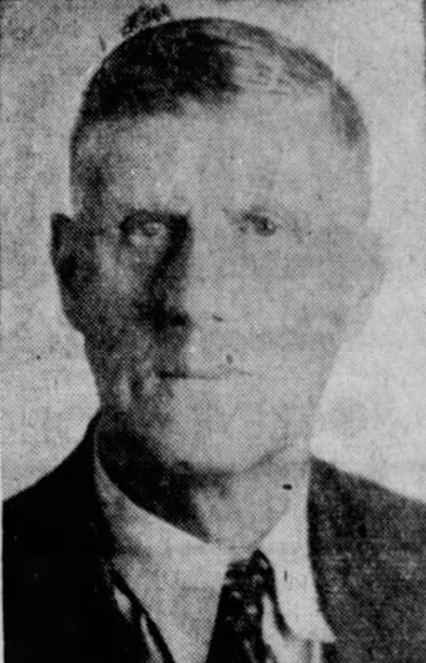
- Morse, pictured in a 1948 newspaper

Member of the Legislative Assembly of New Brunswick
- In office 1944–1952
- Constituency: Charlotte

Personal details
- Born: February 15, 1918 Woodwards Cove, New Brunswick
- Died: March 19, 1965 (aged 83) St. Andrews, New Brunswick
- Party: New Brunswick Liberal Association
- Spouse(s): Blanche Tidd; Hilary Mary Herbert
- Children: 11
- Occupation: Lobster merchant

Owen Bradford Morse (February 3, 1882 – March 19, 1965) was a Canadian politician. He served in the Legislative Assembly of New Brunswick as member of the Liberal party from 1944 to 1952.
