= 37th New Brunswick Legislature =

Canadian provincial legislative assembly

The 37th New Brunswick Legislative Assembly represented New Brunswick between February 12, 1931, and May 22, 1935.

Hugh Havelock McLean served as Lieutenant-Governor of New Brunswick.

Frederick C. Squires was chosen as speaker.

The Conservative Party led by John Babington Macaulay Baxter formed the government. Baxter was replaced by Charles Dow Richards in 1931. Leonard P. Tilley became leader in 1933 after Richards left politics.

== Members ==
Electoral District	Name	Party	First elected / previously elected
Albert	Fred Colpitts	Liberal	1930
Albert	H. O. Downey	Liberal	1930
Carleton	Fred C. Squires	Conservative	1925
Carleton	Edwin W. Melville	Conservative	1925
Carleton	Gladstone W. Perry	Conservative	1930
Charlotte	Henry I. Taylor	Conservative	1908
Charlotte	Scott D. Guptill	Conservative	1912
Charlotte	George H. I. Cockburn	Conservative	1930
Charlotte	Harry Marshall Groom	Conservative	1930
Gloucester	Clovis T. Richard	Liberal	1926
Gloucester	J. André Doucet	Liberal	1923
Gloucester	Seraphin R. Léger	Liberal	1908, 1917
Gloucester	John B. Lordon	Liberal	1925
Gloucester	Wesley H. Coffyn (1931)	Conservative	1931
Kent	A. Allison Dysart	Liberal	1917
Kent	Auguste J. Bordage	Liberal	1917
Kent	François G. Richard	Liberal	1917
Kings	Alfred J. Brooks	Conservative	1925
Kings	J. William Smith	Conservative	1925
Kings	J.H.A.L. Fairweather	Conservative	1930
Madawaska	Lorne J. Violette	Liberal	1922
Madawaska	Joseph E. Michaud	Liberal	1917
Moncton	E. Albert Reilly	Conservative	1924
Northumberland	F. M. Tweedie	Liberal	1930
Northumberland	William S. Anderson	Liberal	1930
Northumberland	Hidulphe A. Savoie	Liberal	1930
Northumberland	Richard J. Gill	Liberal	1930
Queens	W. Benton Evans	Conservative	1925
Queens	Arthur Moore	Conservative	1925
Restigouche	David A. Stewart	Conservative	1912, 1920
Restigouche	Henry Diotte	Conservative	1920
Saint John City	Leonard P. Tilley	Conservative	1912, 1925
Saint John City	W. Henry Harrison	Conservative	1925
Saint John City	Miles E. Agar	Conservative	1925
Saint John City	Walter W. White	Conservative	1930
Saint John County	H. Colby Smith	Conservative	1926
Saint John County	John M. Baxter	Conservative	1911, 1925
Saint John County	Robert McAllister (1931)	Conservative	1931
Sunbury	Alton D. Taylor	Conservative	1925
Sunbury	Ewart C. Atkinson	Conservative	1925
Victoria	John W. Niles	Liberal	1925
Victoria	Frederick W. Pirie	Liberal	1930
Westmorland	Antoine J. Léger	Conservative	1925
Westmorland	Medley G. Siddall	Conservative	1925
Westmorland	Herbert M. Wood	Conservative	1925
Westmorland	Merville A. Oulton	Conservative	1925
Westmorland	Lewis Smith (1930)	Conservative	1917, 1930
York	James M. Scott	Conservative	1925
York	B. H. Dougan	Conservative	1925
York	Marcus Lorne Jewett	Conservative	1930
York	Charles D. Richards	Conservative	1920

Preceded by 36th New Brunswick Legislature	Legislative Assemblies of New Brunswick; 1931–1935	Succeeded by 38th New Brunswick Legislature
