= 36th New Brunswick Legislature =

The 36th New Brunswick Legislative Assembly represented New Brunswick between March 26, 1926, and May 26, 1930.

William Frederick Todd served as Lieutenant-Governor of New Brunswick in 1926. He was succeeded by Hugh Havelock McLean in December 1928.

Joseph L. O'Brien was chosen as speaker.

The Conservative Party led by John Babington Macaulay Baxter defeated the Liberals to form the government.

== Members ==
Electoral District	Name	Party	First elected / previously elected
Albert	Lewis Smith	Conservative	1917
Albert	John L. Peck	Conservative	1917
Albert	Conrad J. Osman (1927)	Conservative	1927
Carleton	Fred C. Squires	Conservative	1925
Carleton	Edwin W. Melville	Conservative	1925
Carleton	B. Frank Smith	Conservative	1903, 1915, 1925
Charlotte	Henry I. Taylor	Conservative	1908
Charlotte	Scott D. Guptill	Conservative	1912
Charlotte	James S. Lord	Conservative	1925
Fredericton	Charles D. Richards	Conservative	1920
Gloucester	Peter J. Veniot	Liberal	1894, 1917
Gloucester	J. André Doucet	Liberal	1923
Gloucester	John B. Lordon	Liberal	1925
Gloucester	Seraphin R. Léger	Liberal	1908, 1917
Gloucester	Clovis T. Richard (1926)	Liberal	1926
Kent	A. Allison Dysart	Liberal	1917
Kent	Auguste J. Bordage	Liberal	1917
Kent	Francois G. Richard	Liberal	1925
Kings	Hedley V. Dickson	Conservative	1912
Kings	Alfred J. Brooks	Conservative	1925
Kings	J. William Smith	Conservative	1925
Madawaska	Joseph E. Michaud	Liberal	1917
Madawaska	Lorne J. Violette	Liberal	1922
Moncton	E. Albert Reilly	Conservative	1924
Northumberland	Sydney D. Heckbert	Conservative	1925
Northumberland	Francis T. Lavoie	Conservative	1925
Northumberland	Akerley Holmes	Conservative	1925
Northumberland	Joseph Leonard O'Brien	Conservative	1925
Queens	W. Benton Evans	Conservative	1925
Queens	Arthur Moore	Conservative	1925
Restigouche	David A. Stewart	Conservative	1912, 1920
Restigouche	Henry Diotte	Conservative	1920
Saint John City	Leonard P. Tilley	Conservative	1912, 1925
Saint John City	James Lewis	Conservative	1925
Saint John City	W. Henry Harrison	Conservative	1925
Saint John City	Miles E. Agar	Conservative	1925
Saint John County	John M. Baxter	Conservative	1911, 1925
Saint John County	Frank L. Potts	Conservative	1917, 1925
Saint John County	H. Colby Smith (1926)	Conservative	1926
St. Stephen-Milltown	John M. Flewelling	Conservative	1920
St. Stephen-Milltown	Arthur R. MacKenzie (1926)	Conservative	1926
Sunbury	Allan D. Taylor	Conservative	1925
Sunbury	Ewart C. Atkinson	Conservative	1925
Victoria	Oran B. Davis	Liberal	1925
Victoria	John W. Niles	Liberal	1925
Westmorland	Merville A. Oulton	Conservative	1925
Westmorland	Antoine J. Léger	Conservative	1925
Westmorland	Herbert M. Wood	Conservative	1925
Westmorland	Medley G. Siddall	Conservative	1925
York	B. H. Dougan	Conservative	1925
York	G. C. Grant	Conservative	1925
York	James M. Scott	Conservative	1925

Preceded by 35th New Brunswick Legislature	Legislative Assemblies of New Brunswick; 1925–1930	Succeeded by 37th New Brunswick Legislature
