= 39th New Brunswick Legislature =

The 39th New Brunswick Legislative Assembly represented New Brunswick between April 4, 1940, and July 10, 1944.

William George Clark served as Lieutenant-Governor of New Brunswick.

F. A. McGrand was chosen as speaker.

The Liberal Party led by Allison Dysart formed the government. Dysart was replaced by John B. McNair in March 1940.

== Members ==
Electoral District	Name	Party	First elected / previously elected
Albert	A. Russell Colpitts	Liberal	1939
Albert	Harry O. Downey	Liberal	1930
Carleton	Fred C. Squires	Conservative/ Prog. Conservative	1925
Carleton	Gladstone W. Perry	Conservative/ Prog. Conservative	1930
Carleton	E. W. Melville	Conservative/ Prog. Conservative	1925
Charlotte	J.J. Hayes Doone	Liberal	1935
Charlotte	R. Fraser Keay	Liberal	1935
Charlotte	Foster Calder	Liberal	1935
Charlotte	Alexander Dyas	Liberal	1935
Gloucester	Clovis T. Richard	Liberal	1926
Gloucester	William A. Losier	Liberal	1935
Gloucester	J. André Doucet	Liberal	1923
Gloucester	F. T. B. Young (Note: died)	Liberal	1935
Gloucester	Joseph E. Connolly (1940)	Liberal	1940
Kent	Isaie Melanson	Liberal	1939
Kent	Auguste J. Bordage	Liberal	1917
Kent	A. Allison Dysart (Note: resigned to accept appointment as judge)	Liberal	1917
Kent	J. Killeen McKee (1940)	Liberal	1940
Kings	Elmore T. Kennedy	Conservative/ Prog. Conservative	1939
Kings	Hugh Mackay	Conservative/ Prog. Conservative	1939
Kings	Harry A. McMackin	Conservative/ Prog. Conservative	1939
Madawaska	J. Gaspard Boucher	Liberal	1935
Madawaska	Epiphane P. Nadeau	Liberal	1939
Moncton	Charles H. Blakeney	Liberal	1935
Northumberland	William S. Anderson	Liberal	1930
Northumberland	Richard J. Gill	Liberal	1930
Northumberland	Hidulphe A. Savoie	Liberal	1930
Northumberland	Frederick M. Tweedie	Liberal	1930
Queens	W. Benton Evans	Conservative/ Prog. Conservative	1925, 1939
Queens	J. Arthur Moore	Conservative/ Prog. Conservative	1925, 1939
Restigouche	David A. Stewart	Conservative/ Prog. Conservative	1912, 1939
Restigouche	Edward Samuel Mooers	Liberal	1939
Saint John City	Ralph G. McInerney	Conservative/ Prog. Conservative	1939
Saint John City	W. Grant Smith	Conservative/ Prog. Conservative	1939
Saint John City	W. J. Swanton	Conservative/ Prog. Conservative	1939
Saint John City	J. Starr Tait	Conservative/ Prog. Conservative	1939
Saint John County	Alphonso C. Smith	Conservative/ Prog. Conservative	1935
Saint John County	Robert McAllister	Conservative/ Prog. Conservative	1931
Sunbury	Walter C. Lawson	Liberal	1935
Sunbury	F. A. McGrand	Liberal	1935
Victoria	Frederick W. Pirie	Liberal	1930
Victoria	John W. Niles (Note: resigned)	Liberal	1925
Victoria	John B. McNair (1940)	Liberal	1935, (Note: York) 1940
Westmorland	Austin C. Taylor	Liberal	1935
Westmorland	Frank H. Copp	Liberal	1935
Westmorland	Édouard S. Léger	Liberal	1939
Westmorland	A. W. McQueen	Liberal	1939
York	C. Hedley Forbes	Conservative/ Prog. Conservative	1939
York	Charles Price	Conservative/ Prog. Conservative	1939
York	Ford Messer	Conservative/ Prog. Conservative	1939
York	Arthur J. McEvoy	Conservative/ Prog. Conservative	1939

== Notes ==
Preceded by 38th New Brunswick Legislature	Legislative Assemblies of New Brunswick; 1939–1944	Succeeded by 40th New Brunswick Legislature
