= Gloucester (provincial electoral district) =

Defunct provincial electoral district in New Brunswick, Canada

New Brunswick electoral district

Defunct provincial electoral district
- Legislature: Legislative Assembly of New Brunswick
- District created: 1826
- District abolished: 1973
- First contested: 1827
- Last contested: 1972

Gloucester was a provincial electoral district for the Legislative Assembly of New Brunswick, Canada, from the 1828 election of the 9th New Brunswick Legislature. It mirrored Gloucester County, and used a bloc voting system to elect candidates. It was abolished with the 1973 electoral redistribution, divided up into five first past the post districts: Caraquet, Nepisiguit-Chaleur, Nigadoo-Chaleur, Shippagan-les-Îles, and Tracadie.

== Members of the Legislative Assembly ==
Legislature	Years	Member	Party	Member	Party	Member	Party	Member	Party	Member	Party
Riding created from Northumberland
9th	1827 – 1830	Hugh Munro	Ind.								
10th	1831 – 1834	William End	Ind.								
11th	1835 – 1837	William End	Ind.	Peter Stewart	Ind.						
12th	1837 – 1842	William End	Ind.	Peter Stewart	Ind.						
13th	1843 – 1846	William End	Ind.	Joshua Alexandre	Ind.						
14th	1847 – 1850	William End	Ind.	Joseph Read	Ind.						
15th	1851 – 1854	Robert Gordon	Ind.	Joseph Read	Ind.						
16th	1854 – 1856	William End	Ind.	Patrick McNaughton	Ind.						
17th	1856 – 1857	William End	Ind.	Joseph Read	Ind.						
18th	1857 – 1861	William End	Ind.	Joseph Read	Ind.						
19th	1862 – 1865	Robert Young	Ind.	John Meahan	Ind.						
20th	1865 – 1866	Robert Young	Ind.	John Meahan	Ind.						
21st	1866 – 1870	Robert Young	Ind.	John Meahan	Ind.						
22nd	1870 – 1874	Samuel Napier	Ind.	Théotime Blanchard	Cons.						
23rd	1875 – 1876	Kennedy F. Burns	Lib.	Théotime Blanchard	Cons.						
23rd	1876 – 1878	Kennedy F. Burns	Lib.	Patrick G. Ryan	Lib.						
24th	1879 – 1882	Francis J. McManus	Lib.	Patrick G. Ryan	Lib.						
25th	1883 – 1886	Francis J. McManus	Lib.	Patrick G. Ryan	Lib.						
26th	1886 – 1890	James Young	Cons.	Patrick G. Ryan	Lib.						
27th	1890 – 1892	Joseph Poirier	Cons.	Patrick G. Ryan	Lib.						
28th	1892 – 1894	John Sievewright	Ind.	Théotime Blanchard	Cons.						
28th	1895	John Sievewright	Ind.	Peter Veniot	Lib.						
29th	1896 – 1898	John Sievewright	Ind.	Peter Veniot	Lib.	Prosper E. Paulin	Cons.				
29th	1898 – 1899	Joseph Poirier	Cons.	Peter Veniot	Lib.	Prosper E. Paulin	Cons.				
30th	1899	Joseph Poirier	Cons.	Peter Veniot	Lib.	Theobald M. Burns	Cons.				
30th	1900 – 1903	Joseph Poirier	Cons.	John Young	Ind.	Theobald M. Burns	Cons.				
31st	1903 – 1908	Joseph Poirier	Cons.	John Young	Ind.	Theobald M. Burns	Cons.				
32nd	1908 – 1912	Alphonse Sormany	Ind.	James P. Byrne	Lib.	Seraphin R. Léger	Lib.				
33rd	1912 – 1917	Joseph B. Hachey	Ind.	Alfred J. Witzell	Ind.	A.J.H. Stewart	Ind.	Martin J. Robichaud	Ind.		
34th	1917 – 1920	Peter Veniot	Lib.	James P. Byrne	Lib.	Seraphin R. Léger	Lib.	Jean G. Robichaud	Lib.		
35th	1921 – 1922	Peter Veniot	Lib.	James P. Byrne	Lib.	Seraphin R. Léger	Lib.	Jean G. Robichaud	Lib.		
35th	1923 – 1925	Peter Veniot	Lib.	James P. Byrne	Lib.	Seraphin R. Léger	Lib.	J. André Doucet	Lib.		
35th	1925	Peter Veniot	Lib.	Ivan Rand	Lib.	Seraphin R. Léger	Lib.	J. André Doucet	Lib.		
36th	1925 – 1926	Peter Veniot	Lib.	John P. Lordon	Lib.	Seraphin R. Léger	Lib.	J. André Doucet	Lib.		
36th	1926 – 1930	Clovis-Thomas Richard	Lib.	John P. Lordon	Lib.	Seraphin R. Léger	Lib.	J. André Doucet	Lib.		
37th	1931	Clovis-Thomas Richard	Lib.	John P. Lordon	Lib.	Seraphin R. Léger	Lib.	J. André Doucet	Lib.		
37th	1931 – 1935	Clovis-Thomas Richard	Lib.	Wesley H. Coffyn	Cons.	Seraphin R. Léger	Lib.	J. André Doucet	Lib.		
38th	1935 – 1939	Clovis-Thomas Richard	Lib.	F.T.B. Young	Lib.	William A. Losier	Lib.	J. André Doucet	Lib.		
39th	1939 – 1940	Clovis-Thomas Richard	Lib.	F.T.B. Young	Lib.	William A. Losier	Lib.	J. André Doucet	Lib.		
39th	1940 – 1944	Clovis-Thomas Richard	Lib.	Joseph E. Connolly	Lib.	William A. Losier	Lib.	J. André Doucet	Lib.		
40th	1944 – 1945	Clovis-Thomas Richard	Lib.	Joseph E. Connolly	Lib.	Frederick C. Young	Lib.	J. André Doucet	Lib.		
40th	1945 – 1948	J. Michel Fournier	Lib.	Joseph E. Connolly	Lib.	Frederick C. Young	Lib.	J. André Doucet	Lib.		
41st	1948 – 1952	J. Michel Fournier	Lib.	Joseph E. Connolly	Lib.	Frederick C. Young	Lib.	J. André Doucet	Lib.	Ernest Richard	Lib.
42nd	1952 – 1956	J. Michel Fournier	Lib.	Joseph E. Connolly	Lib.	Frederick C. Young	Lib.	J. André Doucet	Lib.	Ernest Richard	Lib.
43rd	1957 – 1960	J. Michel Fournier	Lib.	Joseph E. Connolly	Lib.	Frederick C. Young	Lib.	Claude Savoie	Lib.	Ernest Richard	Lib.
44th	1960 – 1963	J. Michel Fournier	Lib.	H. H. Williamson	Lib.	Bernard A. Jean	Lib.	Claude Savoie	Lib.	Ernest Richard	Lib.
45th	1963 – 1967	J. Omer Boudreau	Lib.	H. H. Williamson	Lib.	Bernard A. Jean	Lib.	Claude Savoie	Lib.	Ernest Richard	Lib.
46th	1967 – 1970	J. Omer Boudreau	Lib.	Gérard Haché	Lib.	Bernard A. Jean	Lib.	A. A. Ferguson	Lib.	Ernest Richard	Lib.
47th	1970 – 1972	J. Omer Boudreau	Lib.	André Robichaud	Lib.	Bernard A. Jean	Lib.	A. A. Ferguson	Lib.	Frank Branch	Lib.
47th	1972 – 1974	J. Omer Boudreau	Lib.	André Robichaud	Lib.	Lorenzo Morais	PC	A. A. Ferguson	Lib.	Frank Branch	Lib.
Riding dissolved into Caraquet, Nepisiguit-Chaleur, Nigadoo-Chaleur, Shippagan-les-Îles and Tracadie

== Election results ==
New Brunswick provincial by-election, 18 September 1972 Resignation of Bernard Jean
Party	Candidate	Votes	%	Elected
Progressive Conservative	Lorenzo Morais	13,685	53.88	✓
Liberal	Richard Savoie	11,714	46.12	
Total valid votes		25,399	97.62	
Total rejected ballots		620	2.38	
Turnout		26,019	81.16	
Eligible voters		32,059		
Source: Elections New Brunswick

1970 New Brunswick general election
Party	Candidate	Votes	%	Elected
Liberal	J. Omer Boudreau	11,333	14.40	✓
Liberal	André Robichaud	11,055	14.05	✓
Liberal	Bernard A. Jean	10,892	13.84	✓
Liberal	Adjutor Ferguson	10,877	13.82	✓
Liberal	Frank Branch	10,552	13.41	✓
Progressive Conservative	Camille Losier	5,175	6.58	
Progressive Conservative	Calixte Chiasson	5,132	6.52	
Progressive Conservative	Roland Boudreau	4,538	5.77	
Progressive Conservative	Odilon Boudreau	4,272	5.43	
Progressive Conservative	William Young	4,211	5.35	
Independent	André Dumont	646	0.82	
Total number of valid votes		78,683		
Total rejected ballots		192	0.84	
Turnout		22,910	87.95	
Eligible voters		26,048		
Source: Elections New Brunswick

1967 New Brunswick general election
Party	Candidate	Votes	%	Elected
Liberal	J. Omer Boudreau	12,350	13.45	✓
Liberal	Adjutor Ferguson	12,048	13.13	✓
Liberal	Gérard Haché	11,900	12.96	✓
Liberal	Bernard A. Jean	11,890	12.95	✓
Liberal	Ernest Richard	11,387	12.41	✓
Progressive Conservative	Bertie Ferguson	6,576	7.16	
Progressive Conservative	Gerard Arseneau	6,539	7.12	
Progressive Conservative	Roland Boudreau	6,513	7.10	
Progressive Conservative	Percy Cormier	6,310	6.97	
Progressive Conservative	Antonin Friolet	6,277	6.84	
Total number of valid votes		91,790		
Turnout (Note: Estimate taken from the number of votes from general polls, 19,720, and adding in the highest number of Liberal and Progressive Conservative votes from each of the advanced polls, as no total number of votes was available for these.)		20,194	100.0	
Source: Elections New Brunswick

1963 New Brunswick general election
Party	Candidate	Votes	%	Elected
Liberal	Harry Williamson	13,979	12.96	✓
Liberal	J. Omer Boudreau	13,938	12.92	✓
Liberal	Bernard Jean	13,916	12.90	✓
Liberal	Rhéal Richard	13,844	12.84	✓
Liberal	Claude Savoie	13,766	12.76	✓
Progressive Conservative	Elizabeth Coughlan	8,068	7.48	
Progressive Conservative	Edmond Landry	7,671	7.11	
Progressive Conservative	Ralph Burns	7,593	7.04	
Progressive Conservative	Yves Haché	7,545	7.00	
Progressive Conservative	Léger Chiasson	7,522	6.98	
Total number of valid votes		107,842		
Source: Canadian Elections Database

1960 New Brunswick general election
Party	Candidate	Votes	%	Elected
Liberal	Rhéal Richard	14,897	13.33	✓
Liberal	Bernard Jean	14,755	13.20	✓
Liberal	Claude Savoie	14,668	13.12	✓
Liberal	Harry Williamson	14,637	13.09	✓
Liberal	Michel Fournier	14,635	13.09	✓
Progressive Conservative	Fernand Lanteigne	7,869	7.04	
Progressive Conservative	Alban Duguay	7,704	6.89	
Progressive Conservative	Ralph Burns	7,648	6.84	
Progressive Conservative	Yves Haché	7,555	6.76	
Progressive Conservative	Warren Luce	7,418	6.64	
Total number of valid votes		111,786		
Source: Canadian Elections Database

1956 New Brunswick general election
Party	Candidate	Votes	%	Elected
Liberal	Rhéal Richard	13,163	12.22	✓
Liberal	Michel Fournier	13,003	12.07	✓
Liberal	Claude Savoie	12,862	11.94	✓
Liberal	Joseph Connolly	12,833	11.91	✓
Liberal	Frederick Young	12,709	11.80	✓
Progressive Conservative	Fernand Lanteigne	9,006	8.36	
Progressive Conservative	Warren Luce	8,846	8.21	
Progressive Conservative	Yves Haché	8,522	7.91	
Progressive Conservative	Ralph Burns	8,476	7.87	
Progressive Conservative	Fred Scott	8,325	7.73	
Total number of valid votes		107,745		
Source: Canadian Elections Database

1952 New Brunswick general election
Party	Candidate	Votes	%	Elected
Liberal	Frederick Young	13,270	12.01	✓
Liberal	Rhéal Richard	13,179	11.93	✓
Liberal	Michel Fournier	13,151	11.90	✓
Liberal	Joseph Connolly	13,092	11.85	✓
Liberal	André Doucet	12,898	11.67	✓
Progressive Conservative	Ralph Burns	8,375	7.58	
Progressive Conservative	Lorenzo Boudreau	8,312	7.52	
Progressive Conservative	Warren Luce	8,228	7.45	
Progressive Conservative	J. L. A. Robichaud	8,209	7.43	
Progressive Conservative	Yves Haché	8,151	7.38	
Independent	Guy Riordan	892	0.81	
Independent	Leo Ferguson	804	0.73	
Independent	Fred Hornibrook	663	0.60	
Independent	Emile Godin	630	0.57	
Independent	Percy Cormier	624	0.56	
Total number of valid votes		110,478		
Source: Canadian Elections Database

1948 New Brunswick general election
Party	Candidate	Votes	Elected
Liberal	Joseph Connolly	Acclaimed	✓
Liberal	André Doucet	Acclaimed	✓
Liberal	Michel Fournier	Acclaimed	✓
Liberal	Rhéal Richard	Acclaimed	✓
Liberal	Frederick Young	Acclaimed	✓
Source: Canadian Elections Database

1944 New Brunswick general election
Party	Candidate	Votes	%	Elected
Liberal	Frederick Young	11,635	15.91	✓
Liberal	Joseph Connolly	11,526	15.76	✓
Liberal	Clovis Richard	11,489	15.71	✓
Liberal	André Doucet	11,477	15.70	✓
Conservative	Albany-M. Robichaud	7,105	9.72	
Conservative	Leo Ferguson	6,450	8.82	
Conservative	L. A. Palmer	6,307	8.63	
Conservative	Eustache Godin	5,688	7.78	
Co-operative Commonwealth	George Duval	728	1.00	
Co-operative Commonwealth	Harry Day	711	0.97	
Total number of valid votes		73,116		
Source: Canadian Elections Database

New Brunswick provincial by-election, 19 August 1940 Death of Frederick T. B. Young
Party	Candidate	Votes	Elected
Liberal	Joseph Connolly	Acclaimed	✓

1939 New Brunswick general election
Party	Candidate	Votes	%	Elected
Liberal	Fred Young	10,973	17.83	✓
Liberal	Clovis Richard	10,838	17.61	✓
Liberal	André Doucet	10,775	17.50	✓
Liberal	William Losier	10,762	17.48	✓
Conservative	Leo Ferguson	4,651	7.56	
Conservative	Joseph Hachey	4,561	7.41	
Conservative	Joseph Talbot	4,528	7.36	
Conservative	A. V. Landry	4,471	7.26	
Total number of valid votes		61,559		
Source: Canadian Elections Database

1935 New Brunswick general election
Party	Candidate	Votes	%	Elected
Liberal	Fred Young	12,256	18.04	✓
Liberal	Clovis Richard	12,237	18.01	✓
Liberal	André Doucet	12,204	17.96	✓
Liberal	William Losier	12,202	17.96	✓
Conservative	Wesley Coffyn	4,861	7.15	
Conservative	Alfred Witzell	4,799	7.06	
Conservative	George Haché	4,758	7.00	
Conservative	Martin Robichaud	4,624	6.81	
Total number of valid votes		67,941		
Source: Canadian Elections Database

== See also ==
- List of New Brunswick provincial electoral districts
- Canadian provincial electoral districts
