= Ernest Richard =

Canadian politician

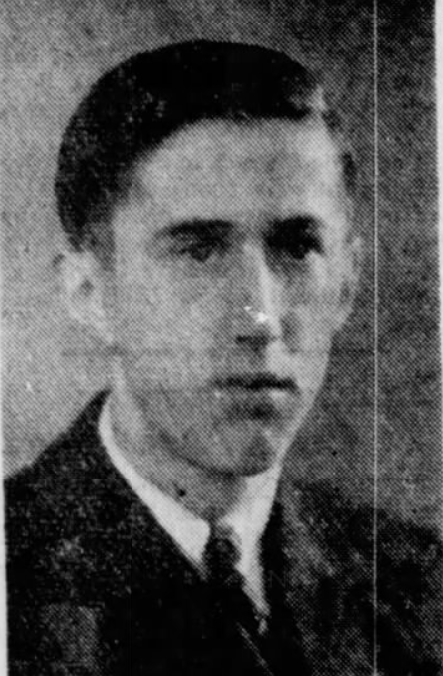
- Richard, pictured in a 1948 newspaper
- Born: May 1, 1922; Shippagan, New Brunswick; Canada
- Died: September 25, 2006 (aged 84); Shippagan, New Brunswick; Canada
- Resting place: St. Jerome Parish Roman Catholic Cemetery
- Occupations: Businessman, politician
- Political party: Liberal
- Board member of: Hotel-Dieu, Tracadie, NB; Advisory Committee, Collège Jésus-Marie, Shippagan
- Spouse: Flora Thériault
- Children: 3 daughters
- Parent(s): Edmond Richard & Marie-Anne Paquette

Rhéal Ernest Richard (May 1, 1922 – September 25, 2006) was a Canadian businessman and politician in the Province of New Brunswick.

Known by his middle name, Ernest Richard was born and raised in Shippagan, New Brunswick. He was involved in the east-coast fishing industry for many years. He was Director General of Shippagan Cold Storage Ltd. and after that company became a subsidiary of Connors Brothers Limited of Blacks Harbour, New Brunswick, he served on the Connors Board of Directors until retiring in 1985.

From 1948 to 1957, Ernest Richard served as a Shippagan town councillor and as Mayor from March 1957 to October 1960. In 1948, Richard also entered provincial politics and was elected by acclamation to the Legislative Assembly of New Brunswick as the Liberal Party member for Gloucester County. He was reelected in 1952, 1956, 1960, 1963, and again in 1967.

In 1960 he was made Speaker of the Legislative Assembly of New Brunswick, serving until 1963 when Premier Louis Robichaud appointed him to his Cabinet as the Province's first ever Minister of Fisheries. Richard remained Minister of Fisheries until his retirement from politics in 1970.

Ernest Richard was involved in a number of community projects and received the Medal of Merit in 1975 for his many years of service to the Canadian Red Cross. In May 1990, the University of Moncton bestowed an honorary Doctorate in fisheries management.

New Brunswick provincial government of Louis Robichaud
Cabinet post (1)
Predecessor	Office	Successor
'New Department'	'Minister of Fisheries'; 1963-1970	'G. W. N. Cockburn'
Legislative Assembly of New Brunswick
Preceded by New riding seat	MLA for Gloucester County; 1948-1970	Succeeded by André Robichaud
