= Hugh Mackay (New Brunswick politician, born 1887) =

Canadian politician

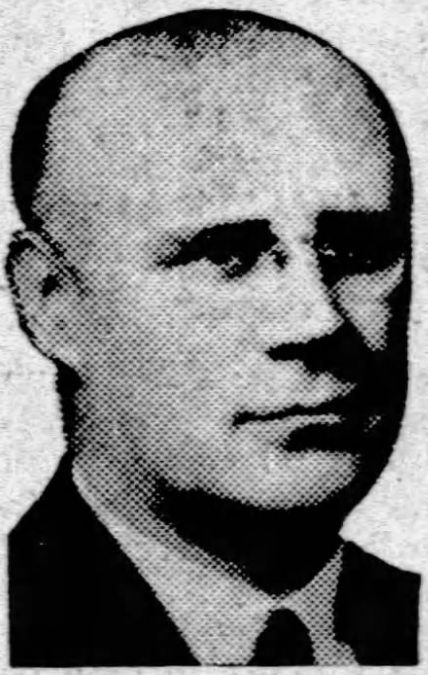
- Mackay in a 1940 newspaper clipping

Member of the Legislative Assembly of New Brunswick
- In office 1939–1952
- Constituency: Kings

Leader of the Conservative / Progressive Conservative Party of New Brunswick
- In office 1939–1951
- Preceded by: Frederick C. Squires
- Succeeded by: Hugh John Flemming

Personal details
- Born: December 29, 1887 Saint John, New Brunswick
- Died: December 6, 1957 (aged 69) Boston, Massachusetts, U.S.
- Party: Progressive Conservative Party of New Brunswick
- Spouse: Katie E. Hazen
- Relations: Douglas Hazen (father-in-law)
- Children: 4
- Occupation: businessman

Hugh "Buff" Mackay (December 19, 1887 – December 6, 1957) was a Canadian lumberman and politician. He served in the Legislative Assembly of New Brunswick as member of the Progressive Conservative party, which he led from 1939 to 1951.

== Life and career ==
Mackay was born to W. Malcolm and Susan R. Mackay. He attended the Rothesay Collegiate School, later going to McGill University. Afterwards, he started working in the lumber industry with his father. In 1915, Mackay became president of the W. Malcolm Mackay Lumber Company. As a result of the November 1939 general election, Mackay became an elected member of the Legislative Assembly of New Brunswick for the district of Kings. At this time, he was also the leader of the Conservative Party in the province.

Mackay ran for the Progressive-Conservative nomination for the Premier of New Brunswick during the 1944 elections, losing to Liberal leader John B. McNair.

== Personal life ==
In 1913, Mackay married Katie Hazen, the daughter of Douglas Hazen, a previous Premier and Chief Justice of New Brunswick. Hazen herself also participated in Conservative politics, at one point serving as president of the National PC Women's Association. She died on October 15, 1969, aged 81.

Mackay lived in Rothesay. On December 6, 1957, he died in Boston, Massachusetts, at the age of 69. Mackay's health had been declining in the months leading up to his death and he went to Boston to seek medical help. He was interred at Fernhill Cemetery.
