= Charles Dow Richards =

Canadian judge

- Charles Dow Richards as Chief Justice

20th Premier of New Brunswick
- In office May 19, 1931 – June 1, 1933
- Monarch: George V
- Lieutenant Governor: Hugh Havelock McLean
- Preceded by: John B. M. Baxter
- Succeeded by: Leonard P. D. Tilley

MLA for York
- In office October 9, 1920 – August 10, 1925 Serving with John A. Young, Samuel L.B. Hunter, James K. Pinder
- Preceded by: William C. Crocket
- Succeeded by: B. H. Dougan
- In office June 18, 1930 – June 2, 1933 Serving with B. H. Dougan, Marcus Lorne Jewett, James M. Scott
- Preceded by: Riding re-created
- Succeeded by: Stewart E. Durling

MLA for Fredericton
- In office August 10, 1925 – June 18, 1930
- Preceded by: Riding created
- Succeeded by: Riding dissolved

Personal details
- Born: June 12, 1879 Southampton, New Brunswick, Canada
- Died: September 15, 1956 (aged 77) Fredericton, New Brunswick, Canada
- Party: Conservative
- Spouse: Grace Bolton (m. 1907)
- Children: 1 daughter
- Education: University of New Brunswick
- Occupation: lawyer, judge
- Profession: politician

Charles Dow Richards (June 12, 1879 – September 15, 1956), was a Canadian lawyer, judge and politician. He served as the 20th premier of New Brunswick from 1931 to 1933.

== Early life and education ==
Richards was born in Southampton, New Brunswick. He attended Fredericton Normal School and later the University of New Brunswick.

== Career ==
Richards taught school for several years. He was admitted to the bar at age 33. and practised law in Fredericton.

Richards was elected to the New Brunswick legislature in 1920. He served as Conservative house leader and then Minister of Lands and Mines under Premier John B. M. Baxter. In 1928 the University of New Brunswick conferred on him an honorary Doctor of Laws degree.

In 1931 Richards became premier of New Brunswick. His two-year administration, in the depths of the Great Depression, instituted public bidding on crown land and fishing rights. In 1933 he left politics when he was appointed to the Supreme Court of New Brunswick, serving as its Chief Justice from 1946 to 1955.

As Justice, Richards sentenced the last man to be executed in Charlotte County. He did not accept the jury's request "that mercy be shown to the accused," 22-year-old Thomas Roland Hutchings, and sentenced him to hang at St. Andrews, New Brunswick on Wednesday, December 16, 1942, for the rape and murder of Bernice Connors.

== Personal life ==
Richards married Grace Bolton. The couple had one daughter, who married a descendant of Philemon Wright.

Richards died in 1956 and was buried in the Forest Hill Cemetery in Fredericton.

Legal offices
Preceded by John B. M. Baxter	Chief Justice of New Brunswick; 1946–1955	Succeeded by John B. McNair
