= 20th New Brunswick general election =

20th New Brunswick general election may refer to:

- 1865 New Brunswick general election, the 20th general election to take place in the Colony of New Brunswick, for the 20th New Brunswick Legislative Assembly
- 1944 New Brunswick general election, the 40th overall general election for New Brunswick, for the 40th New Brunswick Legislative Assembly, but considered the 20th general election for the Canadian province of New Brunswick.
