= 19th New Brunswick general election =

The 19th New Brunswick general election may refer to:

- 1861 New Brunswick general election, the 19th general election to take place in the Colony of New Brunswick, for the 19th New Brunswick Legislative Assembly
- 1939 New Brunswick general election, the 39th overall general election for New Brunswick, for the 39th New Brunswick Legislative Assembly, but considered the 19th general election for the Canadian province of New Brunswick
