= 16th New Brunswick general election =

16th New Brunswick general election may refer to:

- 1854 New Brunswick general election, the 16th general election to take place in the Colony of New Brunswick, for the 16th New Brunswick Legislative Assembly
- 1925 New Brunswick general election, the 36th overall general election for New Brunswick, for the 36th New Brunswick Legislative Assembly, but considered the 16th general election for the Canadian province of New Brunswick.
