= John Rutherford Messer =

Canadian politician

Ford Messer
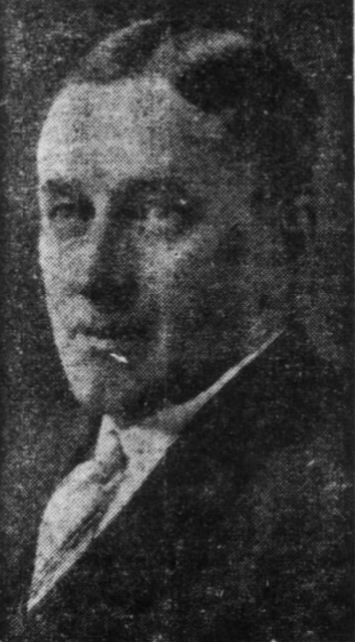
- Born: December 10, 1889; Tweedside, New Brunswick; Canada
- Died: May 27, 1949 (aged 59); Harvey Station, NB; Canada
- Resting place: Harvey Settlement Cemetery
- Occupations: Merchant, horse dealer
- Political party: Conservative Party
- Spouse(s): Annie Piercy Lister (1888–1939), Mrs. William McElroy
- Children: Travis William Edward (b. 1912) Marion (1913–1918)
- Parent(s): William Messer & Sarah Elizabeth Rutherford

John Rutherford "Ford" Messer (December 10, 1889 – May 27, 1949) was a Canadian businessman and politician in the Province of New Brunswick.

Messer was born in the rural community of Tweedside, New Brunswick. He operated a meat business in his home area and was also a dealer in horses. In 1910 he married Annie Piercy Lister with whom he had two children. She died in 1939 and he later married the widow of William McElroy.

== Career ==
Elected to the York County Council in 1937, Ford Messer served until his death in 1949. In the 1939 New Brunswick general election he was elected to the Legislative Assembly of New Brunswick as a Conservative Party candidate for the multi-member riding of York County. Messer served one term in the 39th New Brunswick Legislative Assembly until he was defeated in the 1944 election by the Liberal Party candidate, Harry Corey.

== Death ==
Ford Messer died of a heart attack in 1949.

Legislative Assembly of New Brunswick
Preceded by H. Ralph Gunter	MLA for York County; 1939–1944	Succeeded by Harry A. Corey
