= Alphonse Sormany =

Former Canadian politician

Member of the Legislative Assembly of New Brunswick
- In office 1908–1912 Serving with James P. Byrne, Seraphin R. Léger
- Constituency: Gloucester

Personal details
- Born: March 31, 1880 Lamèque, New Brunswick
- Died: March 5, 1943 (aged 62) Shediac, New Brunswick
- Party: New Brunswick Liberal Association
- Spouse: Eva Couillard (m. 1907)
- Children: 1
- Occupation: Physician, surgeon

Alphonse Sormany (March 31, 1880 – March 5, 1943) was a Canadian politician. He served in the Legislative Assembly of New Brunswick as a member from Gloucester County.
