= Albert Reilly =

Albert Reilly may refer to:

- E. Albert Reilly, lawyer and politician
- Albert Reilly; see List of Spider-Man supporting characters
