= John Messer =

John Messer may refer to:

- John Rissler Messer, member of the Legislative Assembly of Saskatchewan
- John Rutherford Messer, member of the Legislative Assembly of New Brunswick
