= 36th New Brunswick general election =

The 36th New Brunswick general election may refer to

- the 1925 New Brunswick general election, the 36th overall general election for New Brunswick, for the 36th New Brunswick Legislative Assembly, but considered the 16th general election for the Canadian province of New Brunswick, or
- the 2006 New Brunswick general election, the 56th overall general election for New Brunswick, for the 56th New Brunswick Legislative Assembly, but considered the 36th general election for the Canadian province of New Brunswick.
