= Department of Finance (New Brunswick) =

Agency overview
- Jurisdiction: New Brunswick
- Parent department: Government of New Brunswick

The Department of Finance is a part of the Government of New Brunswick. It is charged with New Brunswick's budgetary and tax policy and headed by the finance minister.

The department, or a minister responsible for this area, has existed in one form or another since the creation of New Brunswick as a crown colony in 1784. It has been called Provincial Treasurer and Provincial Secretary-Treasurer in the past.

== Ministers since the establishment of parties in 1935 ==
Minister	Term	Administration
Clovis T. Richard	July 16, 1935 – January 10, 1940	under Allison Dysart
J. J. Hayes Doone	January 10, 1940 – March 13, 1940	under Allison Dysart
J. J. Hayes Doone	March 13, 1940 – August 10, 1949	under John B. McNair
Joseph Gaspard Boucher	August 10, 1949 – October 8, 1952	under John B. McNair
Donald D. Patterson	October 8, 1952 – July 12, 1960	under Hugh John Flemming
Lestock G. Desbrisay	July 12, 1960 – November 12, 1970	under Louis Robichaud
Jean-Maurice Simard	November 12, 1970 – November 18, 1974	under Richard Hatfield
A. Edison Stairs	December 3, 1974 – December 20, 1976	under Richard Hatfield
Lawrence Garvie	December 20, 1976 – November 1, 1977	under Richard Hatfield
Fernand G. Dubé	February 2, 1978 – October 30, 1982	under Richard Hatfield
John B. M. Baxter, Jr.	October 30, 1982 – October 27, 1987	under Richard Hatfield
Allan E. Maher	October 27, 1987 – September 26, 1995	under Frank McKenna
Edmond Blanchard	September 26, 1995 – October 13, 1997	under Frank McKenna
Edmond Blanchard	October 13, 1997 – May 14, 1998	under Ray Frenette
Edmond Blanchard	May 14, 1998 – June 21, 1999	under Camille Thériault
Norman Betts	June 21, 1999 – October 9, 2001	under Bernard Lord
Peter Mesheau	October 9, 2001 – June 27, 2003	under Bernard Lord
Jeannot Volpé	June 27, 2003 – October 3, 2006	under Bernard Lord
Victor Boudreau	October 3, 2006 – July, 2009	under Shawn Graham
Greg Byrne	June 22, 2009 – October 12, 2010	under Shawn Graham
Blaine Higgs	October 12, 2010 — October 7, 2014	under David Alward
Roger Melanson	October 7, 2014 — June 6, 2016	under Brian Gallant
Cathy Rogers	June 6, 2016 — November 8, 2018	under Brian Gallant
Ernie Steeves	November 9, 2018 - November 2, 2024	under Blaine Higgs
René Legacy	November 2, 2024 - present	under Susan Holt
