= Lorenzo Morais =

Canadian politician

Member of the Legislative Assembly of New Brunswick
- In office 1972–1974
- Constituency: Gloucester

Personal details
- Born: March 3, 1933 Caraquet, New Brunswick
- Died: August 30, 2013 (aged 80) Memramcook, New Brunswick
- Party: Progressive Conservative Party of New Brunswick
- Spouse: Majella Robichaud
- Children: 6
- Occupation: businessman

Lorenzo Morais (March 3, 1933 – August 30, 2013) was a Canadian politician. He served in the Legislative Assembly of New Brunswick from 1972 to 1974 as member of the Progressive Conservative Party of New Brunswick.
