= John Young (Gloucester County, New Brunswick politician) =

Former Canadian politician

Member of the Legislative Assembly of New Brunswick
- In office 1899–1907 Serving with Theobald M. Burns, Joseph Poirier
- Constituency: Gloucester

Personal details
- Born: May 1, 1841 Tracadie, New Brunswick
- Died: July 12, 1907 (aged 66) Tracadie, New Brunswick
- Party: Independent
- Spouse: Addie M. Hubbard (m. 1867)
- Occupation: General Merchant

John Young (May 1, 1841 – July 12, 1907) was a Canadian politician. He served in the Legislative Assembly of New Brunswick as a member from Gloucester County.
