= James Joseph Hayes Doone =

Canadian politician (1888–1953)

J. J. Hayes Doone
- J. J. Hayes Doone
- Born: August 8, 1888; Deadman's Harbour; New Brunswick, Canada
- Died: April 6, 1953 (aged 64)
- Occupations: Lawyer, Politician
- Political party: New Brunswick Liberal Association
- Parent(s): James P. Doone & Mary Hayes

James Joseph Hayes Doone (August 8, 1888 – April 6, 1953) was a Canadian lawyer and political figure in the Province of New Brunswick.

Frequently documented as J. J. Hayes Doone, he was born in the hamlet of Deadman's Harbour near Blacks Harbour on the Bay of Fundy shore in southwestern New Brunswick. During World War I, he served overseas with the 104th Battalion, Canadian Expeditionary Force.

In the 1935 New Brunswick general election, he was elected to the Legislative Assembly of New Brunswick as the Liberal member for Charlotte County. On January 10, 1940, Premier Allison Dysart appointed Hayes Doone to his Cabinet as the Provincial Secretary-Treasurer (Minister of Finance). He served in that capacity for three months then for more than nine years for Dysart's successor, John B. McNair.

J. J. Hayes Doone resigned from Cabinet and from the Legislature on August 10, 1949 following his June 25, 1949 appointment to the Senate of Canada by Canadian Prime Minister Louis St. Laurent. He served as the Senate member for Charlotte County division until his death in 1953 at age sixty-four.

== Quotes ==
"The calamities of the Maritimes have always been casually passed along as acts of God, over which governments have no responsibility; while apparently, from the official point of view, Divinity does not operate in other sectors of Canada."

- J. J. Hayes Doone, March 26, 1952 p. 97 Senate of Canada Debates (quoted on p. 567 in the Dictionary of Canadian Quotations)

New Brunswick provincial government of John B. McNair
Cabinet post (1)
Predecessor	Office	Successor
Clovis T. Richard	'Provincial Secretary-Treasurer'; 1940–1949	J. Gaspard Boucher
