= Epiphane P. Nadeau =

Canadian politician (1879–1943)

Member of the Legislative Assembly of New Brunswick
- In office 1940–1943 Serving with Joseph Gaspard Boucher
- Constituency: Madawaska

Personal details
- Born: December 27, 1879 Saint-Léonard, New Brunswick
- Died: November 27, 1943 (aged 63) Saint-Léonard, New Brunswick
- Party: New Brunswick Liberal Association
- Spouse: Eugénie Soucy

Epiphane P. Nadeau (December 27, 1879 – November 27, 1943) was a Canadian politician. He served in the Legislative Assembly of New Brunswick from 1939 to his death in 1943 as member of the Liberals.
