= A. J. H. Stewart =

Canadian politician (1860–1917)

Member of the Legislative Assembly of New Brunswick
- In office 1912–1917 Serving with Alfred J. Witzell, Martin J. Robichaud, Joseph B. Hachey
- Constituency: Gloucester

Personal details
- Born: April 7, 1874 Dalhousie, New Brunswick
- Died: April 30, 1917 (aged 56) Bathurst, New Brunswick
- Party: Independent
- Spouse(s): Annie Kerr (m. 1884) Isabel Morrison (m. 1893)
- Occupation: railroad executive

Albert John Henry Stewart (December 3, 1860 – April 30, 1917), was a Canadian politician. He served in the Legislative Assembly of New Brunswick from 1912 to 1917 as an independent member.
