= Alfred J. Witzell =

Canadian politician

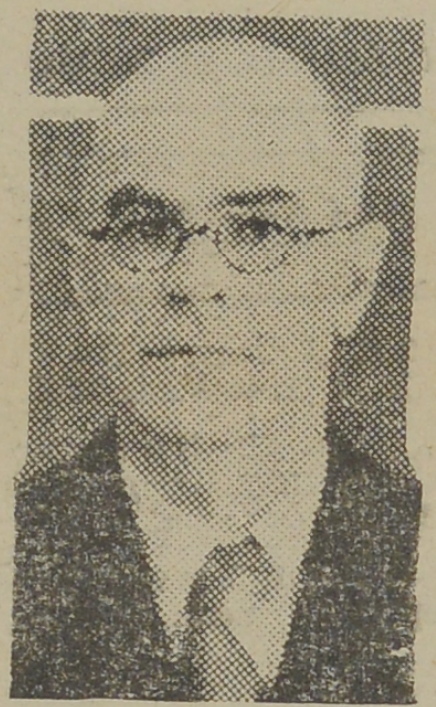
- Witzell, pictured in a 1935 newspaper

Member of the Legislative Assembly of New Brunswick
- In office 1912–1917 Serving with A.J.H. Stewart, Martin J. Robichaud, Joseph B. Hachey
- Constituency: Gloucester

Personal details
- Born: April 26, 1879 Tracadie, New Brunswick
- Died: July 31, 1964 (aged 85) Tabusintac, New Brunswick
- Party: Independent
- Spouse: Ellen Ferguson (m. 1912)
- Children: 3
- Occupation: Accountant

Alfred James Witzell (April 26, 1879 – July 31, 1964), was a Canadian politician. He served in the Legislative Assembly of New Brunswick from 1912 to 1917 as an independent member. He died in 1964.
