= Robert Young (Canadian politician) =

Canadian politician

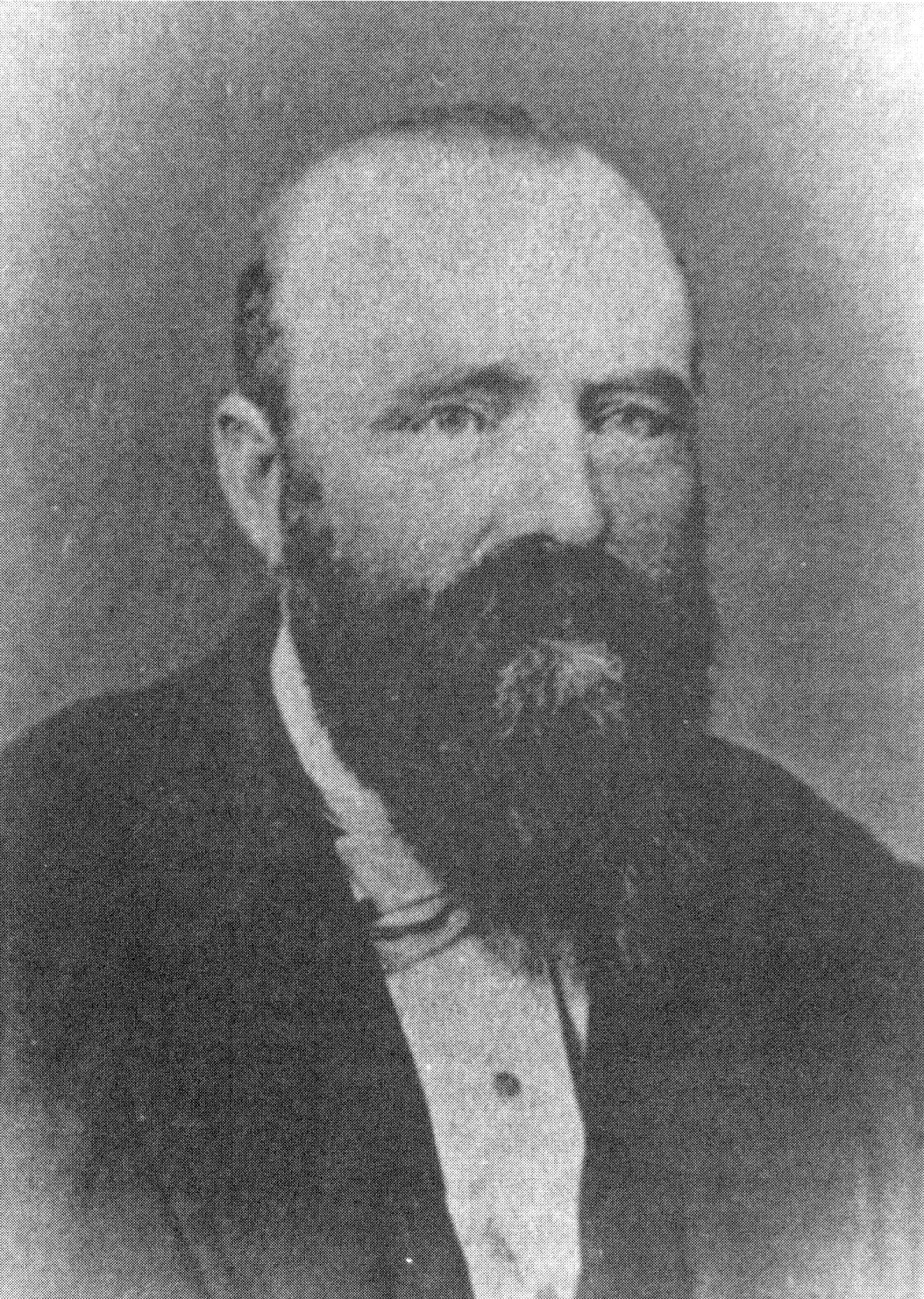
- Born: November 11, 1834; Tracadie, New Brunswick
- Died: February 3, 1904 (aged 69); Caraquet, New Brunswick
- Occupations: Owner, James Young & Sons and provincial politician
- Spouse: Sarah Hubbard
- Children: F.T.B. Young

Robert Young (November 11, 1834 – February 3, 1904) was a businessman and political figure in Canada who was significant in the economic and political development of the city of Caraquet and in the province of New Brunswick.

== Personal background ==
Young was born in Tracadie, New Brunswick, the son and grandson of Scottish immigrants. He was the oldest of James Young and Ann Ferguson's eleven children. Young was educated in Chatham, where in 1857 he married Sarah Hubbard. The Young family was part of a ruling class of powerful English-speaking capitalists in majority French-speaking Gloucester County. His sister Helen married pioneer physician Dr. Alfred Corbett Smith and his brother James Young also became a political figure.

== Business activities ==
Young took over the operation of the Caraquet branch of his father's fishing and canning business, James Young and Sons, in 1851. The firm was one of the largest exporters of dried fish and they also canned fish, lobster, and blueberries. After his father's death in 1866, Young took over the operation of the company and expanded the firm's activities in lobster trapping and canning. In 1882 he owned a lobster cannery at Caraquet and another at Black Point in Shippagan. When he retired, his son Frederick Temple Blackwood Young took over the business.

== Political career ==
Young held various offices in the provincial administration both before and after Canadian Confederation. Young represented Gloucester County in the Legislative Assembly of the Colony of New Brunswick from 1861 to 1867. He was commissioner of lighthouses and buoys for the port of Caraquet and represented Gloucester County on the Board of Agriculture. Despite being an anti-confederate, in 1867 the government of George Edwin King appointed him to the Legislative Council, for which he served as president until 1883.

Because most of his constituents were Acadian, Young supported translating the proceedings of the provincial assembly into French. He also presented a study to the house examining the feasibility of publishing public notices in French newspapers. As a legislator, Young opposed the Common Schools Act of 1871. The act established a non-secular English public education system that was supported by a province-wide tax. The Acadian population considered the bill a threat to the French Catholic education system and to their cultural traditions. Young supported the establishment of lazarettos in the province. In 1849 and in 1853, he and his father had built the first two lazarettos in New Brunswick on land that his father later sold to the province. Young also regularly advocated for the business interests of Gloucester County.

Young was initially a Liberal Party member, but later affiliated with the Liberal-Conservative Party and the Conservative Party.

== Caraquet riots of 1875 ==
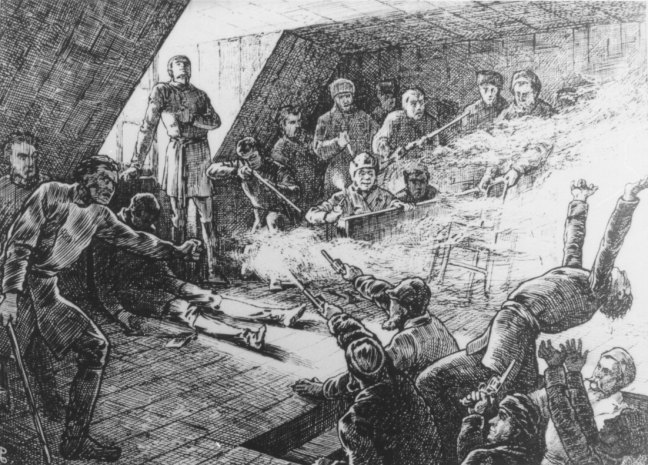
Death of Constable Gifford, this illustration of the shooting appeared in the Canadian Illustrated News, February 13, 1875.

Despite having opposed passage of the Common Schools Act, as the President of the Executive Council, Young had to implement and enforce the law and found himself on the other side of the issue.

In November 1874, members of the Acadian population in Caraquet, most of whom boycotted the school tax, held a meeting to elect parish officials. The minority Protestant population was not included in the meeting and thus questioned the legality of the vote. In political retaliation, Young convened a meeting on January 4 where three Protestants were elected instead. Young's appointments, rather than the Acadian appointments, were then quickly approved by the quarter sessions of Gloucester County.

Soon following, a January 14 public meeting about the school tax ended with a scuffle between attendees.

The next day, an Acadian mob, many of whom were intoxicated, caused significant property damage in a riot in Caraquet. The mob also went to Young's store and then to his home where they threatened the lives of Young's employees and his wife (Young was in Frederickton at the time).

On January 26, Young ordered 10 constables to arrest those involved in the January 15 riot. Additionally, the police were joined by 20 more volunteer militiamen who were recruited by Young and dubbed "Young's Army". When the militia attempted to force entry into an Acadian home on January 27, an exchange of gunfire resulted where Constable John Gifford and Acadian Louis Mailloux were both shot and killed.

Calm was subsequently restored, and nine of the Acadian protesters were arrested for being responsible for the death of Gifford. After two highly publicized trials, the accused Acadians were freed. The Acadians eventually received political concessions. Many in the Acadian community fault Young for the conflict.

== Local political dynasty ==
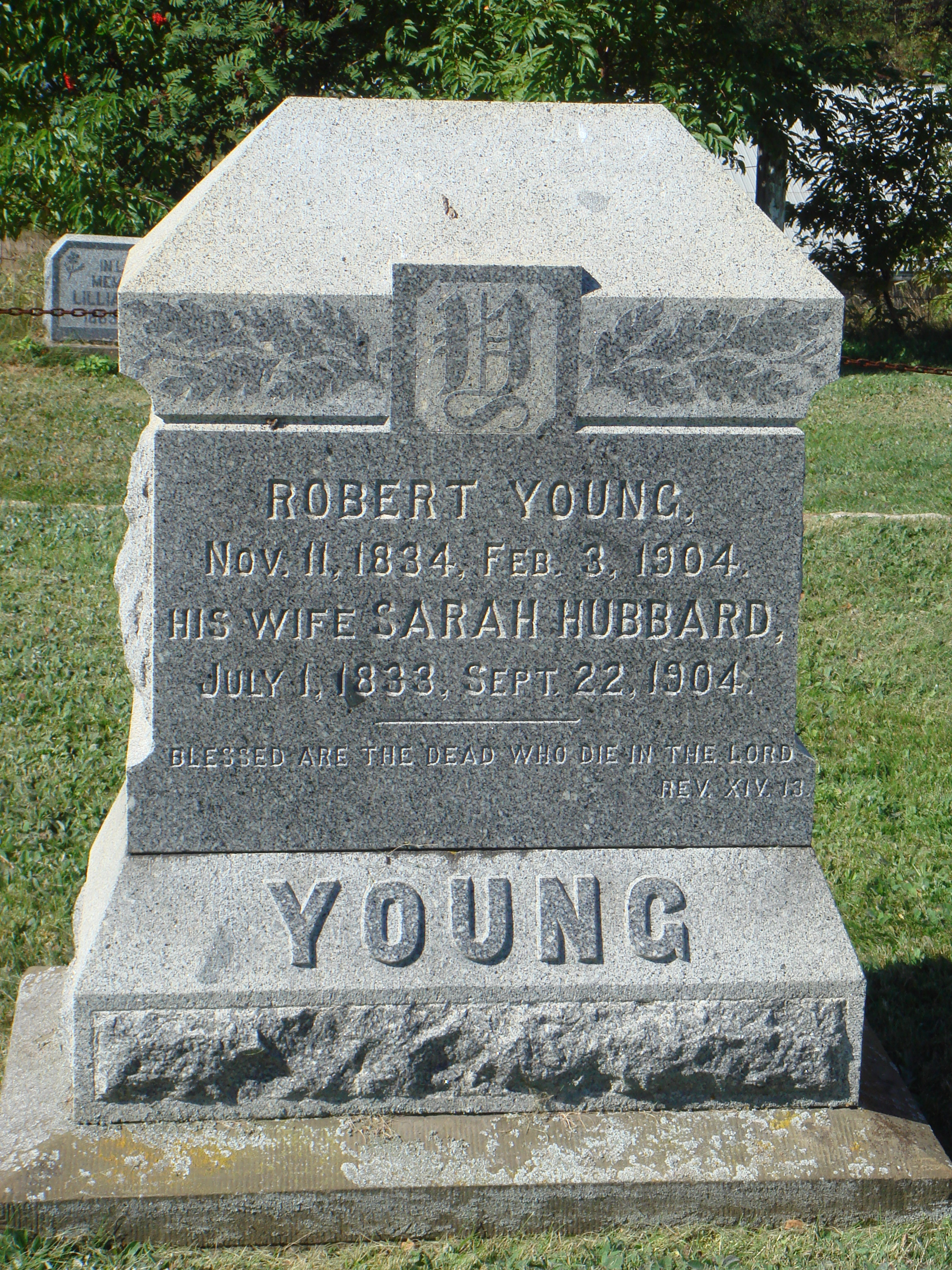
Robert Young gravesite in Caraquet.

Young continued to sit as a member of the Legislative Council until it was abolished in 1892. Young ran unsuccessfully for a seat in the House of Commons of Canada in 1896. He died of heart disease at home in Caraquet at the age of 69.

Young's son, F.T.B. Young, represented Gloucester County in the Legislative Assembly of New Brunswick as did his grandson, Frederick C. Young. Young is also the great-uncle of Doug Young who served in the Legislative Assembly of New Brunswick, in the Canadian House of Commons, and as Minister of several of the ministries in the Cabinet of Canada in the 1990s.
