= Gérard Haché =

Canadian businessperson and politician

Member of the Legislative Assembly of New Brunswick
- In office 1967–1970
- Constituency: Gloucester

Personal details
- Born: March 17, 1925 Saint-Isidore, New Brunswick
- Died: September 22, 2017 (aged 92) Saint-Isidore, New Brunswick
- Party: New Brunswick Liberal Association
- Spouse: Madona Hache
- Children: 6

Gérard Haché (March 17, 1925 – September 22, 2017) was a Canadian politician. He served in the Legislative Assembly of New Brunswick from 1967 to 1970 as a member of the Liberal party.

Haché co-found farm equipment dealer G.G. Haché & Frères Ltée in 1947, was a councilor in Bathurst, New Brunswick and served as school trustee.

== Honours ==
- 125th Anniversary of the Confederation of Canada Medal
- Order of New Brunswick
