= Donald D. Patterson =

Canadian politician (1911–1972)

Donald D. Patterson (March 18, 1911 – November 30, 1972) was a businessman and political figure in New Brunswick, Canada. He represented the City of St. John in the Legislative Assembly of New Brunswick as a Progressive Conservative member from 1952 to 1967.

He was born in Saint John, New Brunswick, the son of Hamilton Patterson. In 1938, he married Mildred Chase. Patterson served as the Provincial Secretary-Treasurer from 1952 to 1960.

New Brunswick provincial government of Hugh John Flemming
Cabinet post (1)
Predecessor	Office	Successor
Joseph Gaspard Boucher	Provincial Secretary-Treasurer; 1952–1960	Lestock Graham DesBrisay
