= Joseph B. Hachey =

Canadian politician

Member of the Legislative Assembly of New Brunswick
- In office 1912–1917 Serving with Alfred J. Witzell, A.J.H. Stewart, Martin J. Robichaud
- Constituency: Gloucester

Personal details
- Born: May 4, 1869 Bathurst, New Brunswick
- Died: March 22, 1953 (aged 76) Bathurst, New Brunswick
- Party: Independent
- Spouse: Sarah Kelley (m. 1898)
- Children: 5
- Occupation: wholesale fish dealer

Joseph Bennet Hachey (March 3, 1877 – March 22, 1953), also known as Benoit Hachey, was a Canadian politician. He served in the Legislative Assembly of New Brunswick from 1912 to 1917 as an independent member. He died in 1953.
