= Stewart E. Durling =

Canadian politician

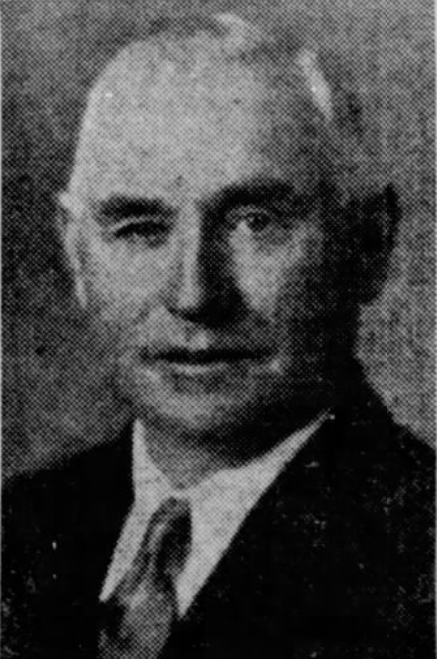
Durling, pictured in a 1935 newspaper

Stewart E. Durling (April 25, 1875 – May 13, 1936) was a Canadian politician in the Province of New Brunswick. He was born in Canterbury, one of twelve children of John Durling and his wife Mary (Ritchie) Durling.

In the 1935 New Brunswick general election he was elected to the Legislative Assembly of New Brunswick as the Liberal Party candidate for the multi-member riding of York. He died unexpectedly in 1936, after an operation in Woodstock, New Brunswick.

Legislative Assembly of New Brunswick
| Preceded by B. H. Dougan | MLA for York County; 1935-1936 | Succeeded by C. Hedley Forbes |
