= H. Ralph Gunter =

Canadian politician

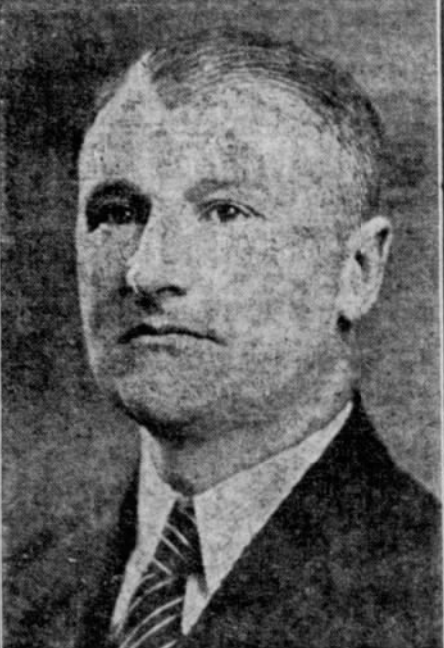
Gunter, pictured in a 1935 newspaper

H. Ralph Gunter (August 23, 1891 – 1973) was a politician in the Canadian province of New Brunswick.

He was born in Ludlow, New Brunswick, the son of Herbert and Eliza Gunter.

In the 1935 New Brunswick general election, he was elected to the Legislative Assembly, one of four Liberal Party candidates elected for the four-member riding of York, ousting the four Conservative incumbents.

He and his wife Gladys June Gunter née Richards (Welsh) and born in Edmundston, New Brunswick (1891–1974) are buried together in the Fredericton Rural Cemetery.

Legislative Assembly of New Brunswick
| Preceded by James M. Scott | MLA for York County; 1935–1939 | Succeeded by Ford Messer |
