= John B. McNair =

Canadian politician and judge (1889–1968)

The Honourable John B. McNair CC QC
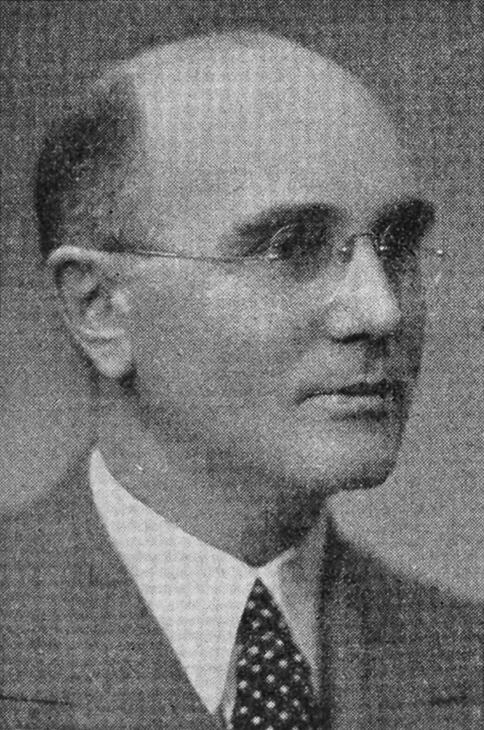
- McNair, pictured in a 1944 newspaper

23rd Premier of New Brunswick
- In office March 13, 1940 – October 7, 1952
- Monarchs: George VI; Elizabeth II
- Lieutenant Governor: William G. Clark; David L. MacLaren
- Preceded by: Allison Dysart
- Succeeded by: Hugh John Flemming

22nd Lieutenant Governor of New Brunswick
- In office June 9, 1965 – January 31, 1968
- Monarch: Elizabeth II
- Governors General: Georges Vanier; Roland Michener
- Premier: Louis Robichaud
- Preceded by: Joseph Leonard O'Brien
- Succeeded by: Wallace Samuel Bird

MLA for York
- In office June 27, 1935 – November 20, 1939 Serving with Ernest W. Stairs, H. Ralph Gunter, Stewart E. Durling
- Preceded by: B. H. Dougan
- Succeeded by: C. Hedley Forbes
- In office August 28, 1944 – September 22, 1952 Serving with Harry A. Corey, Donald T. Cochrane, Henry C. Greenlaw
- Preceded by: Arthur J. McEvoy
- Succeeded by: William J. West

MLA for Victoria
- In office January 24, 1940 – August 28, 1944 Serving with Frederick William Pirie
- Preceded by: John W. Niles
- Succeeded by: Michael F. McCloskey

Personal details
- Born: John Babbitt McNair; November 20, 1889 Andover, New Brunswick, Canada
- Died: June 14, 1968 (aged 78) Fredericton, New Brunswick, Canada
- Resting place: Fredericton Rural Cemetery
- Party: Liberal
- Spouses: Mary MacGregor Crocket (m. 1921; died 1961) Margaret Jones (m. 1963)
- Children: 3 daughters, 1 son
- Education: University of New Brunswick; Oxford University
- Profession: Lawyer, Politician, Judge

John Babbitt McNair CC QC (November 20, 1889 – June 14, 1968) was the 23rd premier of New Brunswick from 1940 to 1952. He worked as a lawyer, politician and judge.

Born in Andover, New Brunswick, he graduated from the University of New Brunswick in 1911 with a B.A. degree. Awarded a Rhodes Scholarship, at Oxford University he earned a B.A. in 1913 and a Bachelor of Civil Law degree in 1914, graduating with first-class honours.

At the onset of World War I he enlisted in the Canadian Expeditionary Force and served on the battlefields of France and Belgium. Captain McNair served again during World War II as a member of the Royal Canadian Artillery Reserves.

John McNair was first elected to the Legislative Assembly of New Brunswick in 1935 New Brunswick general election and served as Attorney-General in the government of Premier Dysart and served as president of the Liberal Party of New Brunswick from 1932 to 1940. He lost his seat in the 1939 election but returned in 1940, succeeding Dysart as leader of the party and premier.

Despite province wide protests, on April 27, 1950 McNair's government implemented a four percent provincial sales tax to help finance the public education system and social services.

McNair served as premier for twelve years until the defeat of his government in 1952 at which time he returned to the practise of law. In 1955 he was named Chief Justice of New Brunswick and became the 22nd Lieutenant Governor of the province in 1965.

In 1967 he was made a Companion of the Order of Canada.

== Early life ==
The Honourable John Babbitt McNair was born to James McNair and Francis Anne Lewis on November 20, 1889, in Andover, Victoria County, New Brunswick. As a youth he attended Andover Grammar School and Florenceville Consolidated School before enrolling at the University of New Brunswick in 1907. He distinguished himself as a scholar before graduating with his B.A. in 1911, receiving numerous awards including the Lieutenant-Governors Award and served as his class valedictorian. He was awarded a Rhodes Scholarship to attend Oxford University, where he further distinguished himself by earning first-class honours, and received a B.A. in 1913 and a B.C.L. in 1914.

Following the outbreak of the First World War, McNair enlisted with the Armed Forces and served with the Canadian Expeditionary Force in France and Germany. By the war's close he had attained the rank of Lieutenant. Following the outbreak of the Second World War, McNair volunteered once again and served as a captain in the Royal Canadian Artillery Reserves.

Following his return to New Brunswick in 1919, McNair was admitted to the bar and entered into a law partnership with J.J.F. Winslow at Fredericton. Over the next 15 years he became a leading member of several fraternal, religious and other community organizations. He also became a barrister and solicitor of some note, eventually being appointed a King's Counsel on July 16, 1935.

== Political career ==
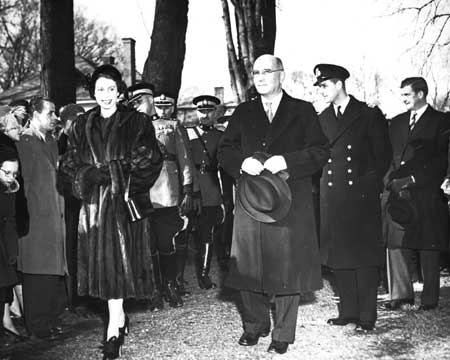
McNair walking with Princess Elizabeth II in 1951

It was during this period that McNair became involved in public affairs. A rising-star in the Liberal Party, in October 1932 he became President of the New Brunswick Liberal Association. He held this position until 1940. During the election campaign of June 1935, McNair was instrumental in A. Alison Dysart's successful election to the premier's office. At the same election, the 46-year-old McNair was elected to the Legislative Assembly as a representative for York County.

McNair was appointed Attorney-General in Premier Dysart's cabinet on July 16, 1935. He held this position for the next seventeen years, until his retirement from politics in 1952. In the Legislative Chambers, McNair distinguished himself as a gifted speaker and was widely regarded as the most able member of Dysart's government. Dysart frequently suffered from ill-health and during his many absences from the Legislature McNair served as Acting premier. Although defeated in York County at the general election of November 20, 1939, a by-election was created for McNair in Victoria County and on January 20, 1940 he was re-elected.

Shortly afterwards Dysart retired from political life, and on March 13, 1940 McNair was sworn in as premier. He also continued as Attorney-General and, with a reputation as a hands-on administrator, he also briefly added the portfolios of Labour, Health and Labour, and Lands and Mines to his responsibilities. Considered to have been New Brunswick's most intellectually gifted premier, McNair was also a shrewd politician and excellent debater who regularly used his cutting wit to fend off criticism from the Opposition benches. He was perhaps the last premier to write all his own speeches, which he did by hand either at his home on Waterloo Row or at his cabin at Gordon Vale.

Governing the province during the war years and through harsh economic times, McNair is credited with introducing a succession of budgetary surpluses, undertaking a massive rural electrification program, improving education in rural areas, expanding the role of the civil service, centralizing the provincial government offices and New Brunswick Electric Power Commission in Fredericton. Following the war, he introduced a variety of social benefit programs, began the modernization of the highway system, and created a Department of Industry and Reconstruction to ensure a smooth economic and social transition for the province from wartime to peacetime.

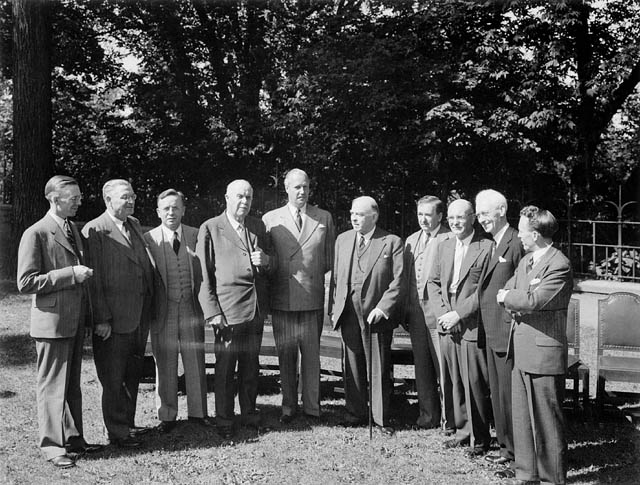
John B. McNair (3rd to the right) at the Dominion-Provincial Conference on Reconstruction

He was also instrumental in modernizing politics. For the August 1944 general election, McNair became the first politician in Canada to employ the services of a professional advertising agency to direct a political campaign. Following this tremendously successful campaign, the Liberals won all but five seats in the Legislature. After a similar election campaign in June 1948, McNair's Liberals were returned to office with a similar majority. McNair continued as premier until his party's defeat at the polls in 1952.

== Later years and death ==
McNair then returned to his Fredericton law practice. In July 1955 he was appointed a Justice in Appeal, Supreme Court of New Brunswick. In October 1955 he was appointed Chief Justice in Appeal, Supreme Court of New Brunswick. He retired from the bench in 1964 on account of age. During his career after politics, McNair was also a member of the Senate for the University of New Brunswick, Chairman of the Selection Committee for the Awarding of the Beaverbrook Scholarships, and a member of the Beaverbrook Art Gallery Board.

In June 1965, at age 76, McNair was appointed Lieutenant-Governor of New Brunswick. He held this position until January 31, 1968 when illness forced him to resign. He died six months later on June 14, 1968.

== Personal life ==
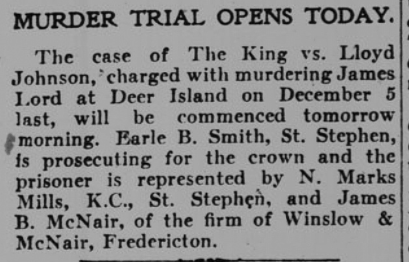
Lloyd Johnson was acquitted of murder after shooting James Linwood Lord in an early-morning drunken altercation on Trecartens Hill in Lords Cove in December 1925, represented by John McNair (here mislabeled James McNair).

McNair married Marion MacGregor Crocket on May 17, 1921, and they had three daughters and one son. Not long after McNair assumed the premiership, his wife's health deteriorated in an alarming fashion and she spent much of her time in hospitals. Therefore, in addition to assuming the responsibility for the affairs of the province, McNair also shouldered the heavy responsibility of raising four children. Following the death of his first wife in 1961, McNair married Margaret Jones on April 27, 1963.

Among the many awards the Hon. John B. McNair received in his life were an honorary L.L.D. from the University of New Brunswick in 1938 and an honorary D.C.L. from Mount Allison University in 1951. He was designated a Companion of the Order of Canada on July 6, 1967, but the award had to be presented posthumously as the scheduled ceremony did not take place until September 23, 1968.

Legal offices
Preceded by Charles D. Richards	Chief Justice of New Brunswick; 1955–1964	Succeeded by George F. G. Bridges
