= Adjutor Ferguson =

Canadian politician

A. A. Ferguson

Member of the Legislative Assembly of New Brunswick
- In office 1967–1978
- Succeeded by: Doug Young
- Constituency: Gloucester (1967–74); Tracadie (1974–78)

Personal details
- Born: May 7, 1927 Tracadie, New Brunswick
- Died: July 28, 2004 (aged 77) Tracadie–Sheila, New Brunswick
- Party: New Brunswick Liberal Association
- Spouse: Theresa Basque
- Children: 11
- Occupation: Salesman

Adjutor A. Ferguson (May 7, 1927 – July 28, 2004) was a Canadian politician. He served in the Legislative Assembly of New Brunswick from 1967 to 1978 as member of the Liberal party.
