= Claude Savoie (politician) =

Canadian politician (1916–1990)

Member of the Legislative Assembly of New Brunswick
- In office 1957–1967
- Constituency: Gloucester

Personal details
- Born: July 30, 1916 Tracadie, New Brunswick
- Died: May 29, 1990 (aged 73) Moncton, New Brunswick
- Party: New Brunswick Liberal Association
- Spouse: Regina Magee
- Children: 10

Joseph Vincent Claude Savoie (July 30, 1916 – May 29, 1990) was a Canadian politician. He served in the Legislative Assembly of New Brunswick from 1957 to 1967 as member of the Liberal party.
