= J. Omer Boudreau =

Canadian politician

Member of the Legislative Assembly of New Brunswick
- In office 1963–1974
- Constituency: Gloucester

Personal details
- Born: October 16, 1916 Robertville, New Brunswick
- Died: 1981 (aged 64–65)
- Party: New Brunswick Liberal Association
- Spouse: Patricia Doucet
- Occupation: real estate agent

Joseph Omer Boudreau (October 16, 1916 – 1981) was a Canadian politician. He served in the Legislative Assembly of New Brunswick from 1963 to 1974 as member of the Liberal party.
