= Martin J. Robichaud =

Canadian politician

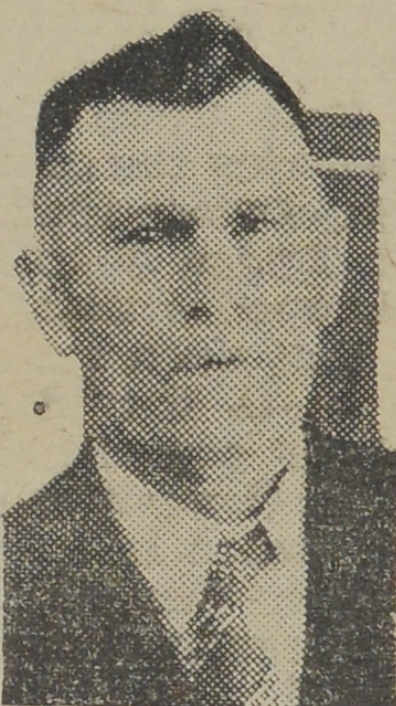
- Robichaud, pictured in a 1935 newspaper

Member of the Legislative Assembly of New Brunswick
- In office 1912–1917 Serving with Alfred J. Witzell, A.J.H. Stewart, Joseph B. Hachey
- Constituency: Gloucester

Personal details
- Born: April 7, 1874 Shippegan, New Brunswick
- Died: October 7, 1958 (aged 84) Tracadie, New Brunswick
- Party: Independent
- Spouse: Marie Landry (m. 1902)
- Children: 7
- Occupation: merchant

Martin J. Robichaud (April 7, 1874 – October 7, 1958) was a Canadian politician. He served in the Legislative Assembly of New Brunswick from 1912 to 1917 as an independent member. He died in 1958.
