= J. André Doucet =

Canadian politician

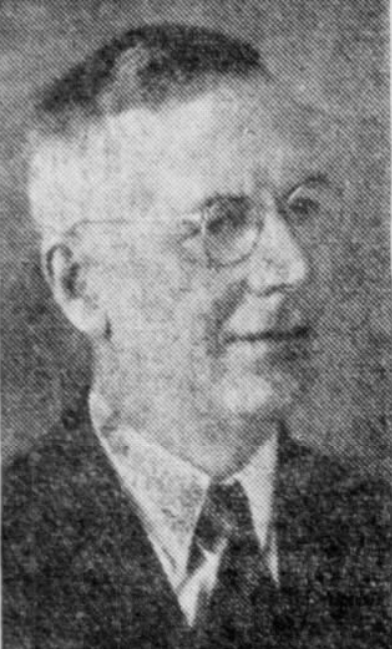
- Doucet, pictured in a 1948 newspaper
- Born: January 1, 1880; Anticosti Island, Quebec
- Died: May 21, 1963 (aged 83); Bathurst, New Brunswick
- Education: Seminary of Quebec; Laval University
- Occupations: Forestry surveyor & consultant Politician
- Political party: Liberal
- Spouse(s): 1) Joséphine Trudel; 2) Alexandrine Lanouette
- Children: Anne-Marie (b. 1914); Yolande (b. c. 1917); Paula (b. 1943)
- Parent(s): Pierre Doucet & Élizabeth Bezeau

Joseph André Doucet (January 1, 1880 – May 21, 1963) was a Canadian politician who was a member of the Legislative Assembly of New Brunswick from 1923–1956 and who served on the Executive Council of New Brunswick from 1940 to 1952.

Born on Anticosti Island, Quebec, André Doucet studied at the Roman Catholic Seminary of Quebec in Quebec City. After graduating with a Bachelor of Arts degree from Laval University in 1902, he moved to the village of Paquetville, Gloucester County, in northeastern New Brunswick.

In 1910, André Doucet married Joséphine Trudel with whom he had two daughters. In 1940, he married a second time to Alexandrine Lanouette with whom he had another daughter.

Active in community affairs, in 1909 he was elected to the Municipal Council for Gloucester County, a position he held until 1911 and then again in 1922-23. From 1910 to 1918, Doucet worked as a surveyor in forestry for the Interior Ministry of the Government of Canada in Ottawa, Ontario. In 1919 he returned to his home in Paquetville where he worked as a consultant.

In 1923, André Doucet successfully ran as the Liberal party's candidate in a Gloucester by-election for a seat in the 35th New Brunswick Legislative Assembly. His constituency reelected him for another seven consecutive terms in 1925, 1930, 1935, 1939, 1944, 1948, and in 1952. Following his party winning power in the 1939 election, the new Liberal Premier, John McNair appointed Doucet the Minister responsible for NB Power and then on March 13, 1940 to Minister of Health and Community Services, a position he would hold until September 27, 1944 when he was appointed to the newly created Ministry of Industry and Reconstruction. Doucet served as the Minister until October 8, 1952, when his party lost the 1952 general election. Reelected, Doucet remained in opposition until he left politics following the 1956 New Brunswick general election.

Retired from politics at age seventy-six, André Doucet received an Honorary Doctorate of Social Sciences from Sacred Heart University in Bathurst and was a member of the Board of Governors of the University of New Brunswick in Fredericton.

André Doucet died on May 21, 1963, in Bathurst, New Brunswick.

New Brunswick provincial government of John B. McNair
Cabinet posts (2)
Predecessor	Office	Successor
New department	'Minister of Industry & Reconstruction'; 1944–1952	J. Roger Pichette
John B. McNair (acting)	'Minister of Health & Community Services'; 1940–1944	Frederic McGrand
