= Wesley H. Coffyn =

Canadian politician

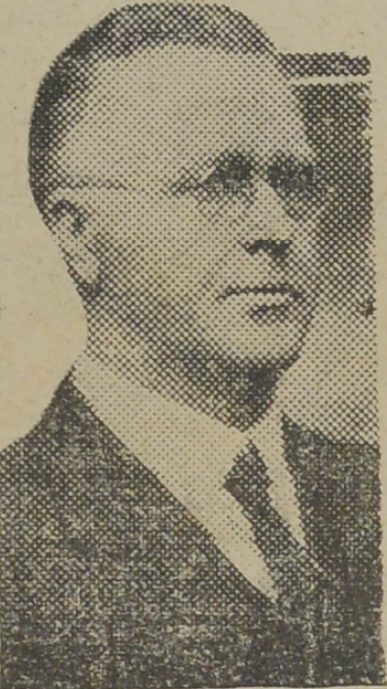
- Coffyn, pictured in a 1935 newspaper

Member of the Legislative Assembly of New Brunswick
- In office 1931–1935
- Constituency: Gloucester

Personal details
- Born: August 7, 1878 St. Peters Bay, Prince Edward Island
- Died: November 27, 1946 (aged 68) Bathurst, New Brunswick
- Party: Conservative Party of New Brunswick
- Spouse: Ella Mills
- Occupation: physician

Wesley H. Coffyn (August 7, 1878 – November 27, 1946) was a Canadian politician. He served in the Legislative Assembly of New Brunswick as member of the Conservative Party representing Gloucester County from 1931 to 1935.
