= G. C. Grant =

Canadian politician

Gordon C. Grant

Member of the Legislative Assembly of New Brunswick
- In office 1925–1928
- Constituency: York

Personal details
- Born: March 2, 1866 Shogomoc, New Brunswick
- Died: July 22, 1928 (aged 62) Shogomoc, New Brunswick
- Party: Conservative Party of New Brunswick
- Spouse: Ida May True
- Children: 3
- Occupation: Farmer and lumberman

Gordon Clifford Grant (March 2, 1866 – July 22, 1928) was a Canadian politician. He served in the Legislative Assembly of New Brunswick as member of the Conservative party representing York County from 1925 to 1928.
