= Charles Price (Canadian politician) =

Canadian politician

Member of the Legislative Assembly of New Brunswick
- In office 1939–1944
- Constituency: York

Personal details
- Born: December 4, 1888 Canterbury, New Brunswick
- Died: October 23, 1957 (aged 68) Fredericton, New Brunswick
- Party: Progressive Conservative Party of New Brunswick
- Spouse: Maye Jamieson
- Children: 3
- Occupation: lumberman and mill operator

Charles Price (December 4, 1888 – October 23, 1957) was a Canadian politician. He served in the Legislative Assembly of New Brunswick as member of the Progressive Conservative party from 1939 to 1944.
