= Frederick C. Young =

Canadian politician

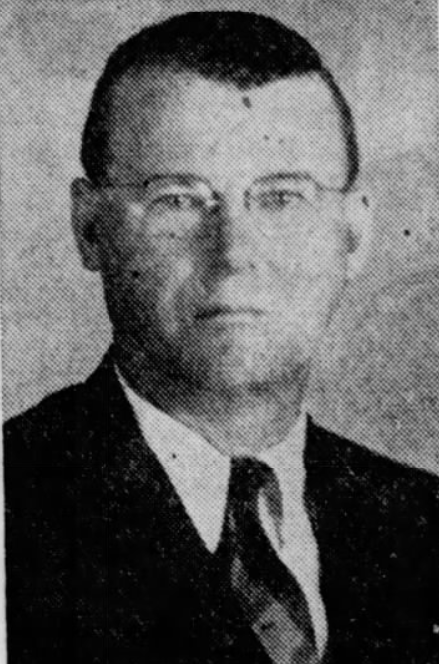
- Young, pictured in a 1948 newspaper

Member of the Legislative Assembly of New Brunswick
- In office 1944–1960
- Constituency: Gloucester

Personal details
- Born: 11 June 1896 Caraquet, New Brunswick
- Died: 9 October 1968 (aged 72) Caraquet, New Brunswick
- Party: Liberal Party of New Brunswick
- Spouse: Janet McLean
- Children: 10
- Occupation: merchant

Frederick Carmen Young (11 June 1896 – 9 October 1968) was a merchant and political figure in New Brunswick, Canada. He represented Gloucester County in the Legislative Assembly of New Brunswick from 1944 to 1960 as a Liberal member.

He was born in Caraquet, New Brunswick, the son of Frederick T. B. Young and Helen Carman. He was educated at the University of New Brunswick. In 1924, Young married Janet McLean. He was a wholesale dealer in fish. Young served overseas during World War I. In 1917, he transferred to the Royal Flying Corps. Frederick and Janet had 10 Children, Nellie, Walter, Robert, Margaret, Harold, Muriel, Frederick, Elizabeth, Marjorie, and Joan. He died in 1968 following a long illness.
