= Joseph E. Connolly =

Canadian politician

Member of the Legislative Assembly of New Brunswick
- In office 1940–1960
- Constituency: Gloucester

Personal details
- Born: December 3, 1887 Bathurst, New Brunswick
- Died: 1973 (aged 85–86) Bathurst, New Brunswick
- Party: New Brunswick Liberal Association
- Children: 6
- Occupation: politician contractor

Joseph Edward Connolly (December 3, 1887 – 1973) was a Canadian politician. He served in the Legislative Assembly of New Brunswick as a member of the Liberal party from 1940 to 1960. He also served as mayor of Bathurst, New Brunswick from 1931 to 1932, 1937 to 1938 and 1942 to 1944.

Connolly was also a prominent curler, having played in the 1931, 1932, 1938 and 1942 Briers for New Brunswick.

== Personal life ==
Connolly married Mary Renelda Clifford in 1919. Connolly predeceased his wife; she died in 1978.
