= Arthur J. McEvoy =

Canadian politician

Arthur James McEvoy (Known as A.J. McEvoy)
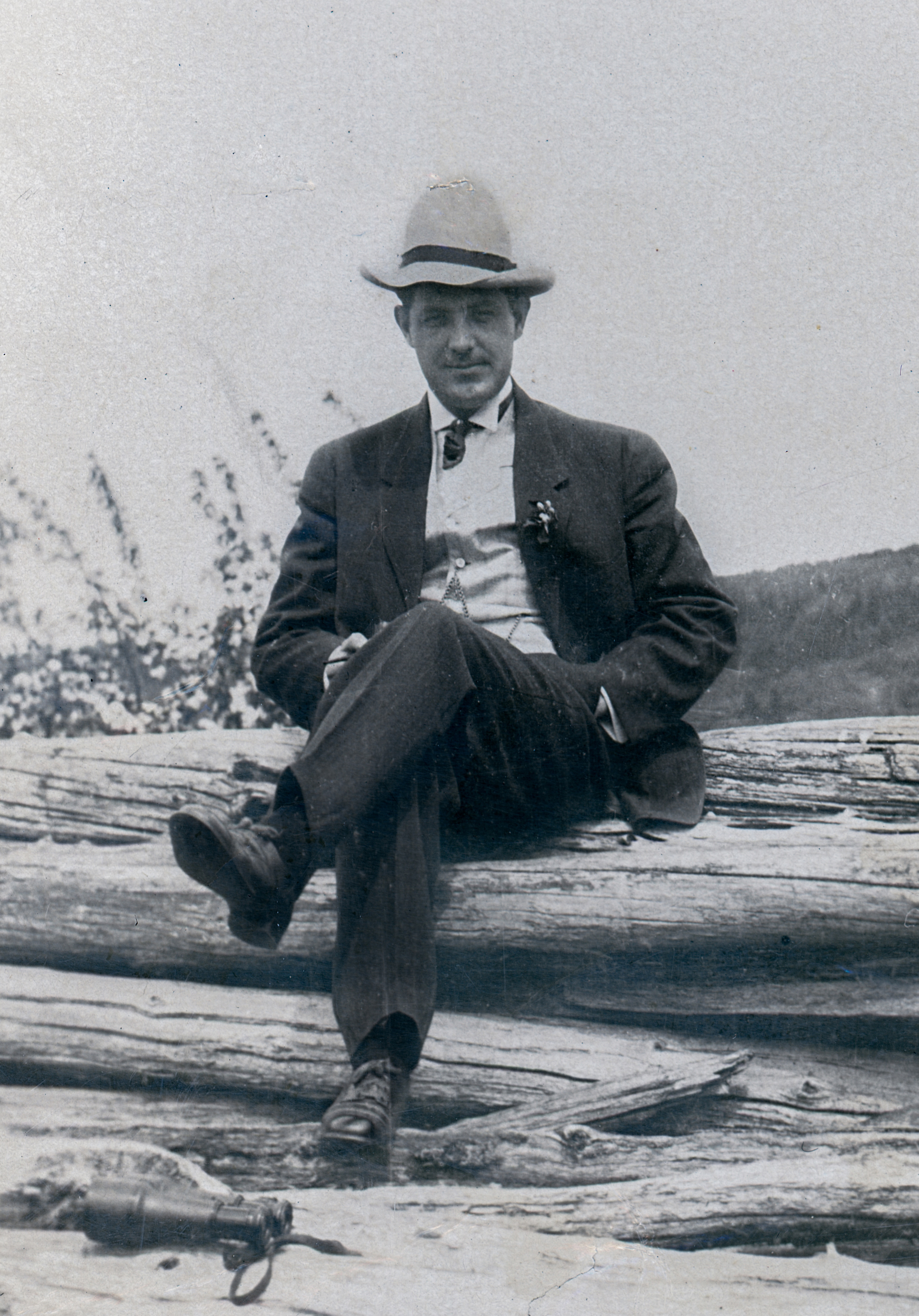

Member of the Legislative Assembly of New Brunswick
- In office 1939–1944
- Constituency: York

Personal details
- Born: May 6, 1882 Marblehead, Massachusetts, U.S.
- Died: October 11, 1941 (aged 59) Saint John, New Brunswick
- Party: Progressive Conservative Party of New Brunswick
- Spouse(s): Helen Trowbridge, Lillian T. Sharkey, Sara H.E. Doone
- Relations: James Joseph Hayes Doone
- Children: 5 (John T, Mary, Virginia, Arthur, Charles)
- Occupation: Accountant

Arthur James McEvoy (May 6, 1882 – October 11, 1941) was a Canadian politician. A long time town councillor and then mayor, he served in the Legislative Assembly of New Brunswick as member of the Progressive Conservative party from 1939 to his death in 1941.
