= William A. Losier =

Canadian politician

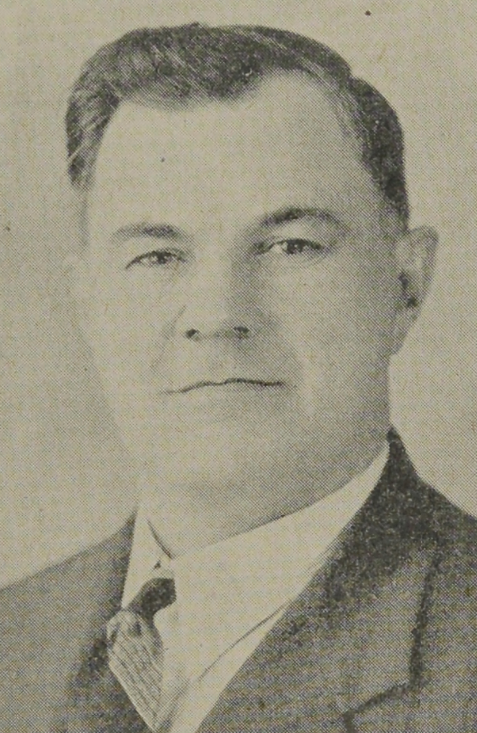
- Losier, pictured in a 1944 newspaper

Member of the Legislative Assembly of New Brunswick
- In office 1935–1944
- Constituency: Gloucester

Personal details
- Born: August 14, 1896 Tracadie, New Brunswick
- Died: April 8, 1952 (aged 55) Tracadie, New Brunswick
- Party: New Brunswick Liberal Association
- Spouse: Jeanne Salesse
- Children: 8
- Occupation: teacher, farmer

William Arthur Losier (August 14, 1896 – April 8, 1952) was a Canadian politician. He served in the Legislative Assembly of New Brunswick as member of the Liberal party from 1935 to 1944.
