= Bernard Jean (politician) =

Canadian politician

Bernard A. Jean (March 2, 1925 – June 4, 2012) was a lawyer and political figure in New Brunswick, Canada. He represented Gloucester County in the Legislative Assembly of New Brunswick as a Liberal member from 1960 to 1970.

He was born in Lamèque, New Brunswick, the son of Ezade G. Jean and Esther Duguay. He was educated at Saint Joseph's University and the Université Laval. Jean was admitted to the bar in 1951. In 1953, he married Corinne Lanteigne. Jean served as speaker for the provincial assembly from 1963 to 1966 when he was named Attorney General. He lived in Caraquet.
