= Clovis-Thomas Richard =

Canadian lawyer and politician

- Born: May 8, 1892; South Framingham, Massachusetts
- Died: August 22, 1976 (aged 84); New Brunswick, Canada
- Education: University of St. Joseph's College; Dalhousie University
- Occupations: Lawyer, Politician
- Political party: Liberal
- Spouse: Alice-Bernadette Hayes
- Children: 4 children
- Parent(s): Irénée Richard & Marie LeBlanc

Clovis-Thomas Richard (May 8, 1892 – August 22, 1976) was a Canadian lawyer and political figure in the Province of New Brunswick. He was born in South Framingham, Massachusetts and raised in College Bridge, New Brunswick. He was educated at University of St. Joseph's College, earning a BA degree before attending Dalhousie University where he graduated in 1918 with a Bachelor of Laws degree.

Richard was a member of the Canadian Expeditionary Force during World War I. After the war, he practiced law; then, in a 1926 by-election to replace Peter Veniot who had been elected to the House of Commons of Canada in Ottawa, Richard won election to the Legislative Assembly of New Brunswick as the Liberal party candidate for the riding of Gloucester County. He was reelected in 1930, 1935, 1939, and 1944.

Richard served as the Provincial Secretary-Treasurer from July 16, 1935 to January 10, 1940. He left provincial politics in 1945 to successfully run for a seat in the Canadian House of Commons as the Liberal Party of Canada candidate in the riding of Gloucester. Reelected in the 1949 Federal election, he served in Ottawa until retiring from politics in 1952.

== Electoral record ==
1949 Canadian federal election: Gloucester
Party	Candidate	Votes	%	±%
Liberal	Clovis-Thomas Richard	14,759	69.78	+7.35
Progressive Conservative	J.L. Albert Robichaud	6,391	30.22	-4.10
Total valid votes		21,150	100.00	

Change for Progressive Conservative candidate Albany Robichaud from 1945 are based on his results running as an Independent.

1945 Canadian federal election: Gloucester
Party	Candidate	Votes	%	±%
Liberal	Clovis-Thomas Richard	11,683	62.43	-3.31
Independent	Albany Robichaud	6,423	34.32	+0.09
Co-operative Commonwealth	François-Xavier Blanchard	609	3.25	
Total valid votes		18,715	100.00	

Change for Independent candidate Albany Robichaud from 1940 are based on his results running as a National Government candidate.

New Brunswick provincial government of Allison Dysart
Cabinet post (1)
Predecessor	Office	Successor
Antoine J. Léger	'Provincial Secretary-Treasurer'; 1940–1949	J. J. Hayes Doone
