= Joseph Gaspard Boucher =

Canadian politician and journalist

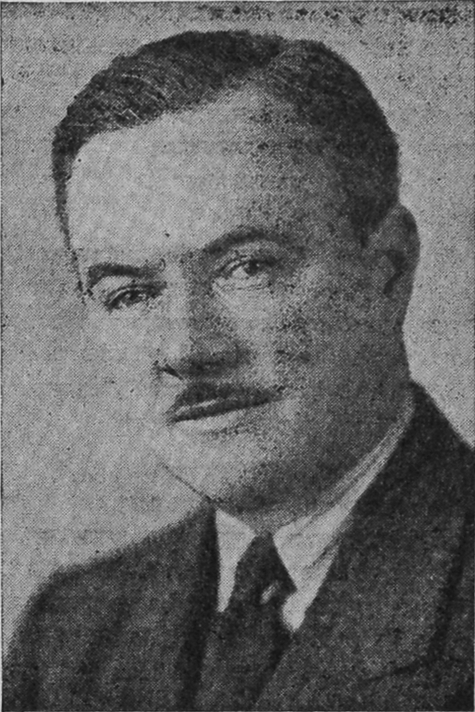
- Boucher, pictured in a 1946 newspaper
- Born: February 3, 1897; Notre-Dame-du-Portage, Quebec, Canada
- Died: April 18, 1955 (aged 58); New Brunswick, Canada
- Education: Collège de Ste-Anne-de-la-Pocatière
- Occupations: Agronomist, Publisher, Politician
- Political party: Liberal
- Spouse: Annette Lamarche
- Children: 9 children
- Parent(s): Aurèle Boucher & Émilie Michaud

Joseph Gaspard Boucher (February 3, 1897 – April 18, 1955) was a journalist and political figure in New Brunswick, Canada. He represented Madawaska County in the Legislative Assembly of New Brunswick from 1935 to 1952 and Restigouche—Madawaska in the House of Commons of Canada as a Liberal member from 1953 to 1955.

Known as Gaspard, he was born in Notre-Dame-du-Portage, Quebec and studied at the agricultural college at Sainte-Anne-de-La-Pocatière and McDonald College (now the Macdonald Campus of McGill University) at Sainte-Anne-de-Bellevue. He worked as an agronomist for some time before moving to Edmundston, New Brunswick in 1920 where he became manager of the Royal Hotel acquired by his father.

Gaspard Boucher married Annette Lamarche in 1921. The couple had nine children.

Gaspard Boucher was involved with the Société nationale des Acadiens and was one of the founders of the New Brunswick chapter of the Ordre de Jacques Cartier, an organization dedicated to defending the rights of Francophones. Gaspard aided in the establishment of credit unions in the Madawaska region and the Knights of Columbus branch in the city of Edmundston.

In 1923, Boucher became owner-editor of Le Madawaska newspaper. Boucher served in the province's Executive Council as a minister without portfolio from 1941 to 1949 and as Provincial Secretary-Treasurer from August 10, 1949, to October 8, 1952.

Gaspard Boucher died of a heart attack at the age of 58.

New Brunswick provincial government of John B. McNair
Cabinet post (1)
Predecessor	Office	Successor
J. J. Hayes Doone	'Provincial Secretary-Treasurer'; 1949–1952	Donald D. Patterson
