= Oran B. Davis =

Canadian politician

Member of the Legislative Assembly of New Brunswick
- In office 1925–1930
- Constituency: Victoria

Personal details
- Born: April 25, 1872 Simonds, New Brunswick
- Died: May 16, 1960 (aged 88) Fredericton, New Brunswick
- Party: New Brunswick Liberal Association
- Spouse: Eliza Fraser
- Occupation: Businessman

Oran Beecher Davis (April 25, 1872 – May 16, 1960) was a Canadian politician. He served in the Legislative Assembly of New Brunswick as member of the Liberal party representing Victoria County from 1925 to 1930.
