= James Young (New Brunswick politician) =

Canadian politician

James Young (May 11, 1841 – July 12, 1907) was a merchant and political figure in New Brunswick, Canada. He represented Gloucester County in the Legislative Assembly of New Brunswick from 1886 to 1890 as a Conservative member.

He was born in Tracadie, New Brunswick, the son of James Young, a Scottish immigrant, and Anne Ferguson. He was educated in Chatham. In 1867, he married Addie Hubbard. Young served on the county council and was warden in 1879.

His brother Robert also served in the provincial assembly.
