= F. T. B. Young =

Canadian politician

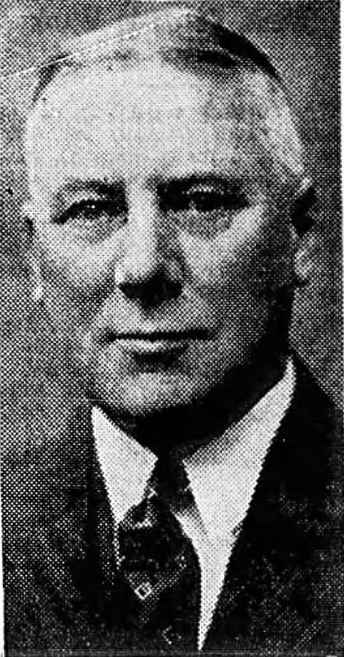
- Young, pictured in a 1940 newspaper
- Born: August 26, 1873; Caraquet, New Brunswick
- Died: April 19, 1940 (aged 66); Fredericton, New Brunswick
- Occupation(s): Owner, James Young & Sons and provincial politician
- Spouse: Helen W. Carman
- Children: Marjorie B. Young, Frederick C. Young

Frederick Temple Blackwood Young (August 26, 1873 – April 19, 1940) was a businessman and politician from Caraquet, New Brunswick, Canada.

Young was born in Caraquet, New Brunswick, the son of Robert Young and Sarah Hubbard. In 1895, Young married Helen W. Carman who was a descendant of United Empire Loyalists and a cousin of Bliss Carman.

Young succeeded his father in the canning and fishing business founded by his grandfather, James Young. The firm was one of New Brunswick's largest exporters of dried fish and they also canned fish, lobster, and blueberries. Young also was active in the lumber industry.

Young had been defeated in 1917, 1920, and 1931 before winning election to represent Gloucester County in the Legislative Assembly of New Brunswick in 1935. He was re-elected to the seat in 1939. Young was a Liberal Party member.

In 1940, Young died in Fredericton while attending a session of the assembly. His death was attributed to apoplexy. Young was widowed twice and had only been married to his third wife for six months before his death. He was survived by seven children. His daughter Marjorie B. Young married J. Harold Kent, the son of Bathurst mayor and businessman W.J. Kent, and his son Frederick C. Young worked in the family firm and also served in the New Brunswick assembly.

He died April 19, 1940, of apoplexy.
