= Marcus Lorne Jewett =

Canadian politician

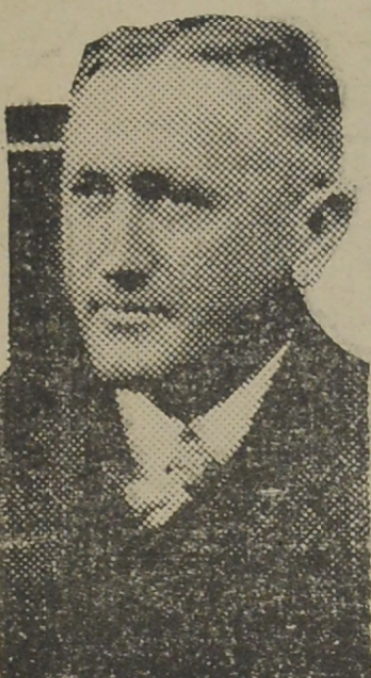
- Jewett, pictured in a 1935 newspaper

Member of the Legislative Assembly of New Brunswick
- In office 1931–1935
- Constituency: York

Personal details
- Born: January 19, 1888 York County, New Brunswick
- Died: October 8, 1955 (aged 67) Fredericton, New Brunswick
- Party: Progressive Conservative Party of New Brunswick
- Spouse: Anna Myrtle Lawrence
- Children: two
- Occupation: physician, surgeon

Marcus Lorne Jewett (January 19, 1888 – October 8, 1955) was a Canadian politician. He served in the Legislative Assembly of New Brunswick as member of the Progressive Conservative party representing York County from 1931 to 1935.
