= Alton D. Taylor =

Canadian politician (1889–1947)

Alton DesBrisay Taylor P.Eng., NBLS

Member of the Legislative Assembly of New Brunswick
- In office 1925–1935
- Constituency: Sunbury

Personal details
- Born: March 30, 1889 St. Stephen, New Brunswick
- Died: July 25, 1947 (aged 58) Grand Lake, New Brunswick
- Party: Conservative Party of New Brunswick
- Spouse: Roberta Barnes Wisely (1891-1960)
- Children: 5
- Occupation: Politician, businessman

Alton Desbrisay Taylor (March 30, 1889 – July 25, 1947) was a Canadian politician. He served in the Legislative Assembly of New Brunswick as member of the Conservative party representing Sunbury County from 1925 to 1935.
