= 1963 New Brunswick general election =

Canadian provincial election

← 1960	April 22, 1963	1967 →

52 seats to the 45th New Brunswick Legislative Assembly 27 seats were needed for a majority
	Majority party	Minority party
	Lib	PC
Leader	Louis Robichaud	Cyril Sherwood
Party	Liberal	Progressive Conservative
Leader since	1958	1960
Leader's seat	Kent	Kings
Last election	31 seats	21 seats
Seats won	32	20
Seat change	▲1	▼1
Percentage	51.8%	48.2%
Swing	▼1.6%	▲2.0%
Premier before election
Louis Robichaud
Liberal
Premier after election
Louis Robichaud
Liberal

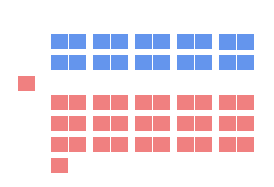
Rendition of party representation in the 45th New Brunswick Legislative Assembly decided by this election. Liberals (32) Progressive Conservatives (20)

The 1963 New Brunswick general election was held on April 22, 1963, to elect 52 members to the 45th New Brunswick Legislative Assembly, the governing house of the province of New Brunswick, Canada.

The election was called by surprise by Liberal Premier Louis Robichaud. The Progressive Conservatives, under leader Cyril Sherwood, had accused the Liberals of corruption for allowing an Italian company, Cartiere del Timavo, to construct a paper mill in Newcastle, and grant it rights to Crown land over other companies. The Conservatives also claimed that Lieutenant-Governor Leonard O'Brien had sold land to the company. Robichaud made a quick decision to call an election amid those accusations.

Analysts had wondered why Robichaud decided to call the election only two-and-a-half years into his mandate over what they thought was a small issue. Several of his projects, such as tax reform and an overhaul of post-secondary education (which eventually led to the creation of the Université de Moncton and the University of New Brunswick at Saint John), died in the legislature. However, Robichaud later said that he held the election while his popularity was at its height, and the Conservatives were weak.

Robichaud campaigned on a platform of economic development and encouragement of outside investment in the province. Cartiere del Timavo threatened to cancel the project if the Liberals lost the election. Many voters perceived Sherwood as too timid in his attacks on the Liberals on the campaign trail, as compared to his vigorous speeches in the Legislature.

The campaign coincided with a federal election, which was held two weeks earlier. That election saw the Conservatives of John Diefenbaker defeated by the Liberals of Lester Pearson. Robichaud then used the Liberal victory nationally as leverage provincially and promised New Brunswick would receive better treatment from the federal government with the same party in power.

On election day, the Liberals were re-elected with an increased majority of one seat over the 1960 election.

New Brunswick general election, 1963
Party	Leader	Seats	Pop Vote
New Brunswick Liberal Association	Louis Robichaud	32	51.8%
Progressive Conservative Party of New Brunswick	Cyril Sherwood	20	48.2%

Popular vote
Liberal	51.80%
PC	48.20%

Seats summary
Liberal	61.54%
PC	38.46%
