= 1952 New Brunswick general election =

Canadian provincial election

| ← 1948 | September 22, 1952 | 1956 → |

52 seats of the Legislative Assembly of New Brunswick 27 seats needed for a majority
| | First party | Second party |
|---|---|---|
| Leader | Hugh John Flemming | John B. McNair |
| Party | Progressive Conservative | Liberal |
| Leader since | 1951 | 1940 |
| Leader's seat | Carleton | York (lost re-election) |
| Last election | 5 | 47 |
| Seats won | 36 | 16 |
| Seat change | ▲31 | ▼31 |
| Percentage | 48.9% | 49.2% |
| Swing | ▲17.7% | ▼8.6% |
Premier before election
John B. McNair
Liberal
Premier after election
Hugh John Flemming
Progressive Conservative

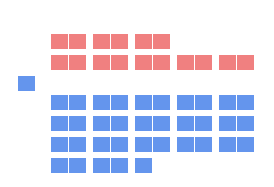
Rendition of party representation in the 42nd New Brunswick Legislative Assembly decided by this election. Progressive Conservatives (36) Liberals (16)

The 1952 New Brunswick general election was held on September 22, 1952, to elect 52 members to the 42nd New Brunswick Legislative Assembly, the governing house of the province of New Brunswick, Canada. Despite winning a very narrow plurality in the popular vote, the Liberals under Premier John B. McNair lost government to the Progressive Conservatives under Hugh John Flemming.

New Brunswick general election, 1952
| Party | Leader | Seats | Pop Vote |
|---|---|---|---|
| Progressive Conservative Party of New Brunswick | Hugh John Flemming | 36 | 48.9% |
| New Brunswick Liberal Association | John B. McNair | 16 | 49.2% |
| Co-operative Commonwealth Federation | Claude P. Milton | 0 | 1.3% |
| Social Credit Party | | 0 | 0.5% |
| Other / Non-Partisan | | 0 | 0.1% |

Popular vote
| Liberal | 49.20% |
| PC | 48.90% |
| CCF | 1.30% |
| Social Credit | 0.50% |
| Others | 0.10% |

Seats summary
| PC | 69.23% |
| Liberal | 30.77% |
