= 1960 New Brunswick general election =

Canadian provincial election

← 1956	June 27, 1960	1963 →

52 seats of the Legislative Assembly of New Brunswick 27 seats needed for a majority
	First party	Second party
Leader	Louis Robichaud	Hugh John Flemming
Party	Liberal	Progressive Conservative
Leader since	1958	1951
Leader's seat	Kent	Carleton
Last election	15	37
Seats won	31	21
Seat change	▲16	▼16
Percentage	53.4%	46.2%
Swing	▲7.3%	▼6.0%
Premier before election
Hugh John Flemming
Progressive Conservative
Premier after election
Louis Robichaud
Liberal

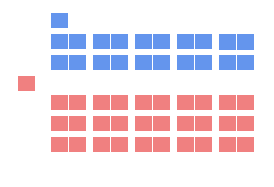
Rendition of party representation in the 44th New Brunswick Legislative Assembly decided by this election. Liberals (31) Progressive Conservatives (21)

The 1960 New Brunswick general election was held on June 27, 1960, to elect 52 members to the 44th New Brunswick Legislative Assembly, the governing house of the province of New Brunswick, Canada. The election resulted in the defeat of the incumbent Conservative government of Hugh John Flemming by the Liberals led by Louis Robichaud.

New Brunswick general election, 1960
Party	Leader	Seats	Pop Vote
New Brunswick Liberal Association	Louis Robichaud	31	53.4%
Progressive Conservative Party of New Brunswick	Hugh John Flemming	21	46.2%
Other / Non-Partisan		0	0.4%

Popular vote
Liberal	53.40%
PC	46.20%
Others	0.40%

Seats summary
Liberal	59.62%
PC	40.38%
