= Henri Diotte =

Canadian politician (1874–1945)

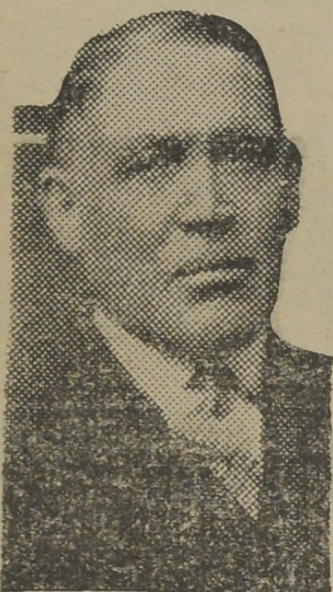
- Diotte, pictured in a 1935 newspaper

Member of the Legislative Assembly of New Brunswick
- In office 1921–1935
- Constituency: Restigouche

Personal details
- Born: November 30, 1874 Carleton, Quebec
- Died: March 8, 1945 (aged 70) Quebec City, Quebec
- Party: Conservative Party of New Brunswick
- Spouse: Marian LeClair
- Occupation: farmer

Henri Diotte (November 30, 1874 – March 8, 1945) was a Canadian politician. He served in the Legislative Assembly of New Brunswick as member of the Conservative party representing Restigouche County from 1921 to 1935.
