= 1925 New Brunswick general election =

Canadian provincial election

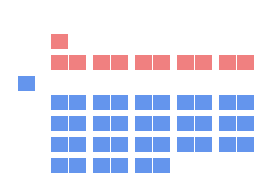
Rendition of party representation in the 36th New Brunswick Legislative Assembly decided by this election. Conservatives (37) Liberals (11)

The 1925 New Brunswick general election was held on 10 August 1925, to elect 48 members to the 36th New Brunswick Legislative Assembly, the governing house of the province of New Brunswick, Canada. Although political parties had no standing in law, thirty-seven MLAs declared themselves to be Conservatives, and eleven declared themselves to be Liberals resulting in the defeat of the government of Peter Veniot.

New Brunswick general election, 1925
Party	Leader	Seats
Opposition (Conservative)	John Babington Macaulay Baxter	37
Government (Liberal)	Peter Veniot	11

Seats summary
Conservative	77.08%
Liberal	22.92%
