= J. William Smith =

Canadian politician

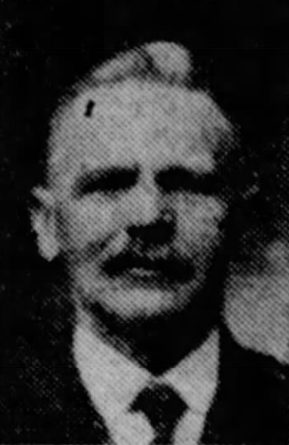

Member of the Legislative Assembly of New Brunswick
- In office 1925–1935
- Constituency: Kings

Personal details
- Born: October 31, 1868 Kingston, New Brunswick
- Died: August 8, 1937 (aged 68) Saint John, New Brunswick
- Party: Conservative Party of New Brunswick
- Spouse: Elizabeth
- Children: four
- Occupation: Contractor and builder

J. William Smith (October 31, 1868 – August 8, 1937) was a Canadian politician. He served in the Legislative Assembly of New Brunswick as member of the Conservative party representing Kings County from 1925 to 1935.
