= Lorne J. Violette =

Canadian politician

Lorne J. Violette (September 7, 1884 – ?) was a physician and political figure in New Brunswick, Canada. He represented Madawaska County in the Legislative Assembly of New Brunswick from 1922 to 1925.

He was born in Saint-Léonard, New Brunswick, the son of Béloni E. Violette and Sophie Smith. Violette was educated at Saint Joseph's College in Memramcook and Laval University. He received his medical degree from Laval in 1911 and became a visiting doctor at the Hôtel-Dieu hospital in Saint-Basile. In 1913, he married Laura M. Ouellette. Violette served as a surgeon with the Canadian Army during World War I. In 1920, he became mayor of Saint-Basile.
