= Frederick William Pirie =

Canadian politician

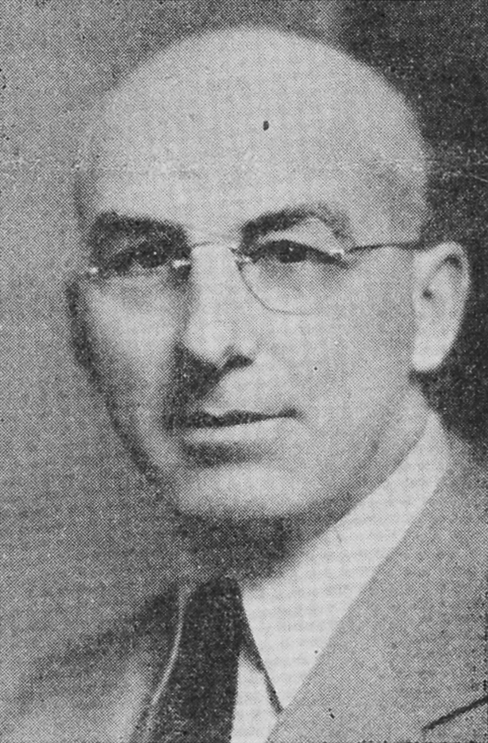
Pirie, pictured in a 1944 newspaper

Frederick William Pirie (February 1, 1893 – October 3, 1956) was an industrialist and political figure in New Brunswick.

Born in Red Rapids, New Brunswick, Frederick Pirie represented Victoria County in the Legislative Assembly of New Brunswick as a Liberal member from 1930 to 1945. He served as Minister of Lands and Mines in the province's Executive Council from 1935 to 1945.

He went on the represent Victoria-Carleton division in the Senate of Canada from 1945 to 1956. He died in office at the age of 63.

New Brunswick provincial government of John B. McNair
Cabinet post (1)
Predecessor	Office	Successor
Himself	Minister of Lands and Mines; 1940-1945	John B. McNair
New Brunswick provincial government of Allison Dysart
Cabinet post (1)
Predecessor	Office	Successor
Leonard P. D. Tilley	Minister of Lands and Mines; 1935-1940	Himself
