= Ewart C. Atkinson =

Canadian politician (1892–1967)

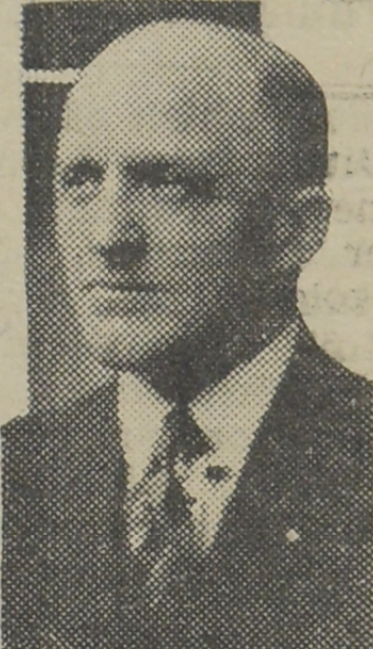
- Atkinson, pictured in a 1935 newspaper

Member of the Legislative Assembly of New Brunswick
- In office 1925–1935
- Constituency: Sunbury

Personal details
- Born: May 26, 1892 Waasis, New Brunswick
- Died: September 29, 1967 (aged 75) New Brunswick
- Party: Conservative Party of New Brunswick
- Spouse: Florence Coy
- Children: two
- Occupation: lawyer, lumberman

Arthur Ewart Clair Atkinson (May 26, 1892 – September 29, 1967) was a Canadian politician. He served in the Legislative Assembly of New Brunswick as member of the Conservative party representing Sunbury County from 1925 to 1935.

He coached the UNB Reds men's ice hockey team from 1914 to 1915.
