= John P. Lordon =

Canadian politician

Member of the Legislative Assembly of New Brunswick
- In office 1925–1931
- Constituency: Gloucester

Personal details
- Born: January 8, 1881 New Brunswick
- Died: December 29, 1931 (aged 50) Bathurst, New Brunswick
- Party: New Brunswick Liberal Association
- Spouse: Jane Wood
- Children: Paul B. Lordon
- Occupation: sawmill proprietor and lumber operator

John P. Lordon (January 8, 1881 – December 29, 1931) was a Canadian politician. He served in the Legislative Assembly of New Brunswick as member of the Liberal party representing Gloucester County from 1925 to 1931.
