= James M. Scott (Canadian politician) =

Canadian politician

Member of the Legislative Assembly of New Brunswick
- In office 1925–1935
- Constituency: York

Personal details
- Born: October 2, 1860 Dumfries, New Brunswick
- Died: July 25, 1943 (aged 82) Fredericton, New Brunswick
- Party: Progressive Conservative Party of New Brunswick
- Spouse: Frances Evaline Graham
- Children: nine
- Occupation: Lumberman

James Mitchell Scott (October 2, 1860 – July 25, 1943) was a Canadian politician. He served in the Legislative Assembly of New Brunswick as member of the Progressive Conservative party representing York County from 1925 to 1935.
