= 1956 New Brunswick general election =

Canadian provincial election

← 1952	June 18, 1956	1960 →

52 seats of the Legislative Assembly of New Brunswick 27 seats needed for a majority
	First party	Second party
Leader	Hugh John Flemming	Austin Claude Taylor
Party	Progressive Conservative	Liberal
Leader since	1951	1952
Leader's seat	Carleton	Westmorland
Last election	36	16
Seats won	37	15
Seat change	▲1	▼1
Percentage	52.2%	46.1%
Swing	▲3.3%	▼3.1%
Premier before election
Hugh John Flemming
Progressive Conservative
Premier after election
Hugh John Flemming
Progressive Conservative

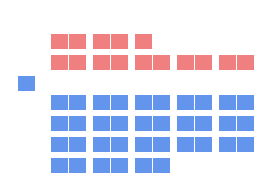
Rendition of party representation in the 43rd New Brunswick Legislative Assembly decided by this election. Progressive Conservatives (37) Liberals (15)

The 1956 New Brunswick general election was held on June 18, 1956, to elect 52 members to the 43rd New Brunswick Legislative Assembly, the governing house of the province of New Brunswick, Canada. The incumbent Progressive Conservative government of Hugh John Flemming was re-elected.

New Brunswick general election, 1956
Party	Leader	Seats	Pop Vote
Progressive Conservative Party of New Brunswick	Hugh John Flemming	37	52.2%
New Brunswick Liberal Association	Austin Claude Taylor	15	46.1%
Social Credit Party		0	1.6%
Other / Non-Partisan		0	0.1%

Popular vote
PC	52.20%
Liberal	46.10%
Social Credit	1.60%
Others	0.10%

Seats summary
PC	71.15%
Liberal	28.85%
