= W. Benton Evans =

Canadian politician (1882–1967)

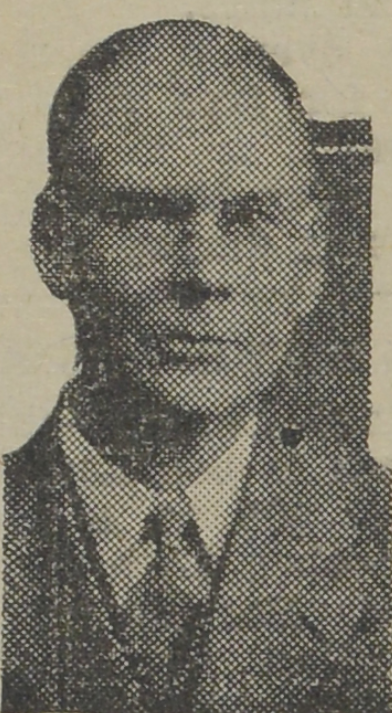
- Evans, pictured in a 1935 newspaper

Member of the Legislative Assembly of New Brunswick
- In office 1925–1935; 1939–1944
- Constituency: Queens

Personal details
- Born: January 18, 1882 Fredericton, New Brunswick
- Died: July 21, 1967 (aged 85) Fredericton, New Brunswick
- Party: Progressive Conservative Party of New Brunswick
- Spouse: Ella M. Mersereau
- Occupation: Coal Mine Operator

William Benton North Evans (January 18, 1882 – July 21, 1967) was a Canadian politician. He served in the Legislative Assembly of New Brunswick as member of the Progressive Conservative party from 1925 to 1935 and 1939 to 1944.
