= Seraphin R. Léger =

Canadian politician

Member of the Legislative Assembly of New Brunswick
- In office 1917–1935
- Constituency: Gloucester

Personal details
- Born: August 28, 1870 Waasis, New Brunswick
- Died: May 15, 1935 (aged 64) St. Mary's, New Brunswick
- Party: New Brunswick Liberal Association
- Spouse: Elizabeth Mauzerold
- Children: 16
- Occupation: merchant

Seraphin R. Léger (August 28, 1870 – May 15, 1935) was a Canadian politician. He served in the Legislative Assembly of New Brunswick as member of the Liberal party representing Gloucester County from 1917 to 1935.
