= C. Hedley Forbes =

Canadian politician

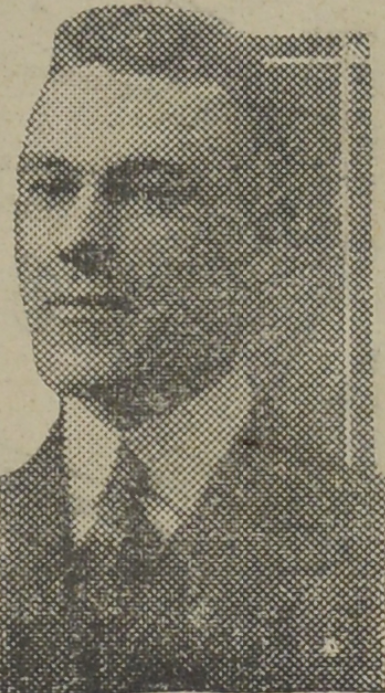
- Forbes, pictured in a 1935 newspaper

Member of the Legislative Assembly of New Brunswick
- In office 1939–1944
- Constituency: York

Personal details
- Born: May 28, 1896 Cross Creek, New Brunswick
- Died: March 24, 1979 (aged 82) Fredericton, New Brunswick
- Party: Progressive Conservative Party of New Brunswick
- Spouse: Elizabeth Rowena Carpenter
- Children: 2
- Occupation: druggist

Charles Hedley Forbes (May 27, 1896 – March 24, 1979) was a Canadian politician. He served in the Legislative Assembly of New Brunswick as member of the Progressive Conservative party from 1939 to 1944.
