= 1944 New Brunswick general election =

Canadian provincial election

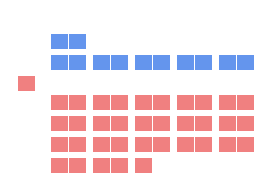
Rendition of party representation in the 40th New Brunswick Legislative Assembly decided by this election. Liberals (36) Conservatives (12)

The 1944 New Brunswick general election was held on August 28, 1944, to elect 48 members to the 40th New Brunswick Legislative Assembly, the governing house of the province of New Brunswick, Canada. The incumbent Liberal government was re-elected.

The members were elected in 17 districts. One district, Moncton, elected one member. The other elected from two to four members, through the Multiple non-transferable vote system.

New Brunswick general election, 1944
Party	Leader	Seats	Pop Vote
New Brunswick Liberal Association	John B. McNair	36	48.3%
Conservative Party of New Brunswick	Hugh Mackay	12	40.0%
Co-operative Commonwealth Federation	J. A. Mugridge	0	11.7%

Popular vote
Liberal	48.30%
PC	40.00%
CCF	11.70%

Seats summary
Liberal	75.00%
PC	25.00%
