= E. W. Melville =

Canadian politician

Edwin W. Melville
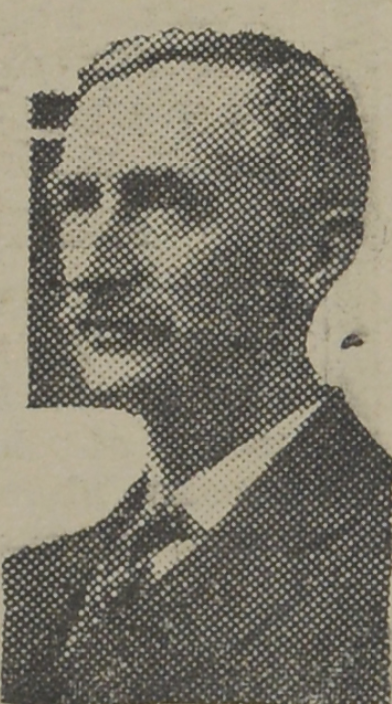
- Melville, pictured in a 1935 newspaper

Member of the Legislative Assembly of New Brunswick
- In office 1925–1942
- Constituency: Kings

Personal details
- Born: October 11, 1870 Simonds, New Brunswick
- Died: April 22, 1942 (aged 71) Stickney, New Brunswick
- Party: Progressive Conservative Party of New Brunswick
- Spouse: Addie E. Lovely
- Children: 7
- Occupation: farmer

Edwin Welmont Melville (October 11, 1870 – April 22, 1942) was a Canadian politician. He served in the Legislative Assembly of New Brunswick as member of the Progressive Conservative party from 1925 to 1942.
