= E. Albert Reilly =

Canadian politician

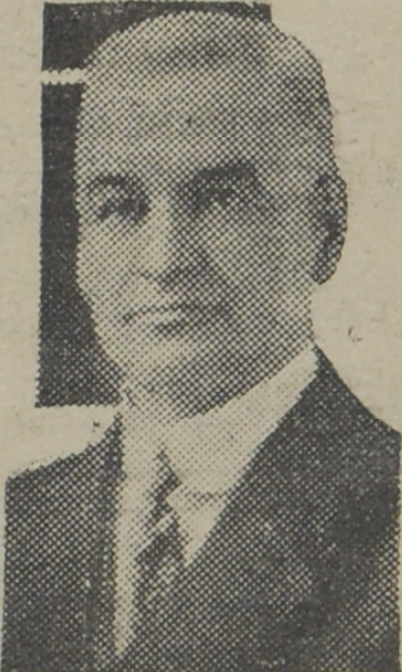
Reilly, pictured in a 1935 newspaper

Edward Albert Reilly (July 4, 1868 – October 22, 1943) was a lawyer and political figure in New Brunswick. He represented the City of Moncton in the Legislative Assembly of New Brunswick from 1924 to 1935 as a Conservative member.

He was born in Melrose, New Brunswick, the son of Patrick and Mary Reilly, both of Irish descent, and was educated at St. Joseph's College in Memramcook. Reilly was alderman for Moncton from 1908 to 1909 and mayor from 1910 to 1911. He also served as president of the Moncton Board of Trade. Reilly was first elected to the provincial assembly in a 1924 by-election held after Clifford William Robinson was named to the Canadian senate.
