= B. H. Dougan =

Canadian politician (1867–1940)

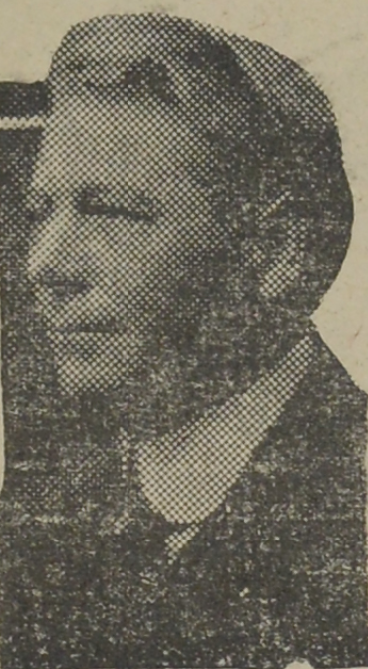
Dougan, pictured in a 1935 newspaper

Dr. Benjamin Hayes Dougan (December 5, 1867 - January 1, 1940) was a Canadian physician and politician in the Province of New Brunswick.

== Biography ==
Dougan was born in Hampstead, New Brunswick on December 5, 1867.

Known by his middle name, in the 1901 Canadian census, he is listed as Hazen Dugan. At census time, he was at his future in-laws home in Gagetown, New Brunswick. In 1906, he married Blanch M. Slipp (1878–1959).

Dougan became a medical doctor and he and his wife made their home in Harvey Station, New Brunswick. In 1924, he gained wide recognition as the Province's coroner who conducted the inquiry into the sensational shooting deaths of two young female siblings in Fosterville, New Brunswick. Capitalizing on his celebrity following the January 1925 trial and conviction of Darius H. Thornton for the double murders, in the August provincial election Dougan was elected to the Legislative Assembly of New Brunswick as the Conservative Party candidate in the multiple-member riding of New Brunswick. He was reelected in 1930 and served until June 27, 1939.

Benjamin Hayes Dougan died at Fraser Memorial Hospital in Fredericton on January 1, 1940. He and his wife are buried in the Fredericton Rural Cemetery.

Legislative Assembly of New Brunswick
Preceded by Samuel L.B. Hunter	MLA for York County; 1925-1935	Succeeded by Stewart E. Durling
