= John W. Niles =

Canadian politician (1876–1961)

John Weldon Niles

Member of the Legislative Assembly of New Brunswick
- In office 1925–1940
- Constituency: Victoria

Personal details
- Born: February 2, 1876 Woodstock, New Brunswick
- Died: August 22, 1961 (aged 85) Fredericton, New Brunswick
- Party: New Brunswick Liberal Association
- Spouse: Grace Witherly
- Occupation: hardware merchant

John Weldon Niles (February 2, 1876 – August 22, 1961) was a Canadian politician. He served in the Legislative Assembly of New Brunswick as member of the Liberal party from 1925 to 1940.
