= Frederick C. Squires =

Canadian politician (1881–1960)

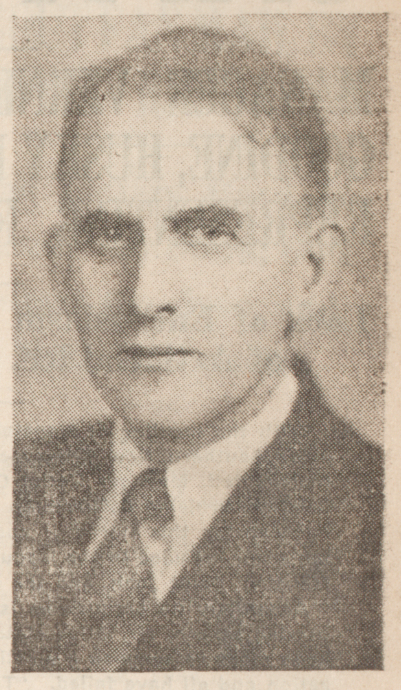
Squires, pictured in a 1937 newspaper

Frederick Charles Squires (November 13, 1881 – December 16, 1960) was a Canadian politician and lawyer from New Brunswick. He represented Carleton County in the Legislative Assembly of New Brunswick from 1925 to 1948 as a Conservative member.

Squires was born in Bath, New Brunswick, the son of Robert Squires and Elizabeth Turner, both of United Empire Loyalist descent. He was educated at the provincial normal school, the University of New Brunswick and Harvard Law School. In 1912, he married Hattie Duncan Pierce (1886–1977). Squires also was a high school principal. He served as speaker for the provincial assembly from 1931 to 1935. He was a member of the local masonic lodge and of the Knights of Pythias. On March 5, 1936, Squires was chosen House Leader of the opposition Conservatives, becoming Leader of the Opposition, and was subsequently appointed Leader of the Conservative Party in New Brunswick. His party was again defeated in the 1939 provincial election after which Squires resigned as party leader due to ill health.

In 1953, Squires was appointed clerk of the legislature and law clerk, and held these positions until his 1959.

Squires died on December 16, 1960, at Victoria Public Hospital in Fredericton, New Brunswick. He was 79.

Political offices
Preceded by Joseph Leonard O'Brien	Speaker of the Legislative Assembly of New Brunswick; 1931–1935	Succeeded by Hedley F. G. Bridges
