= 1935 New Brunswick general election =

Canadian provincial election

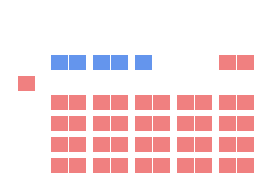
Rendition of party representation in the 38th New Brunswick Legislative Assembly decided by this election. Liberals (43) Conservatives (5)

The 1935 New Brunswick general election was held on June 27, 1935, to elect 48 members to the 38th New Brunswick Legislative Assembly, the governing house of the province of New Brunswick, Canada. The incumbent Conservative government of Leonard Percy de Wolfe Tilley was defeated.

This was the first election in which women could run for election to the NB Legislature. But no women MLAs were elected until the 1967 New Brunswick general election.

New Brunswick general election, 1935
Party	Leader	Seats	Pop Vote
New Brunswick Liberal Association	Allison Dysart	43	59.6%
Conservative Party of New Brunswick	Leonard Percy de Wolfe Tilley	5	40.2%
Other / Non-Partisan		0	0.2%

Popular vote
Liberal	59.60%
Conservative	40.20%
Others	0.20%

Seats summary
Liberal	89.58%
Conservative	10.42%

== Sources ==
- Frank B. Feigert (1989). Canada Votes, 1935-1988. Duke University Press. pp. 160. ISBN 9780822308942.
