= 1939 New Brunswick general election =

Canadian provincial election

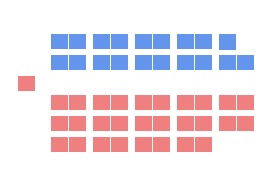
Rendition of party representation in the 39th New Brunswick Legislative Assembly decided by this election. Liberals (29) Conservatives (19)

The 1939 New Brunswick general election was held on November 20, 1939, to elect 48 members to the 39th New Brunswick Legislative Assembly, the governing house of the province of New Brunswick, Canada. The Liberal government of Allison Dysart was re-elected with a reduced majority.

New Brunswick general election, 1939
Party	Leader	Seats	Pop Vote
New Brunswick Liberal Association	Allison Dysart	29	54.8%
Conservative Party of New Brunswick	Frederick C. Squires	19	45.0%
Other / Non-Partisan		0	0.2%

Popular vote
Liberal	54.80%
Conservative	45.00%
Others	0.20%

Seats summary
Liberal	60.42%
Conservative	39.58%
