= Canadian federal election results in New Brunswick =

Electoral history
Year	Results
2025	
2021	
2019	
2015	
2011	
2008	
2006	
2004	
2000	
1997	
1993	
1988	
1984	
1980	
1979	
1974	
1972	
1968	
1965	
1963	
1962	
1958	
1957	
1953	
1949	
1945	
1940	
1935	

Canadian federal elections have provided the following results in New Brunswick.

== Regional profile ==
New Brunswick results in federal elections are divided among geographical and linguistic lines: The Liberals fare better in the predominantly francophone eastern and northern sections of the province, while the anglophone south and west has historically tended to favour the Conservatives. In 1993, Saint John was one of only two ridings in the country to go Progressive Conservative, electing Elsie Wayne.

In 1997, the Liberals were reduced to three seats in the province due to unpopular cuts to employment insurance and social programs. The Liberals improved their seat count to six in 2000 after reversing the change.

The Conservatives improved their seat count in each election from 2004 to 2011, until the Liberals swept New Brunswick (along with the rest of Atlantic Canada) in the 2015 election. In 2019, the Conservatives were able to regain 3 seats, while the Greens made history by picking up Fredericton, their first seat outside B.C. Their vote percentage almost quadrupled to 17%, replacing the NDP as the main third party. In 2021 though, support for the Greens collapsed down to 5% with their sole MP having crossed the floor to the Liberals and being re-elected as such. The Liberals widened their popular support but lost one seat to the Conservatives.

=== Votes by party throughout time ===
Election	Liberal	Conservative	New Democratic	Green	PC	Reform / Alliance	Others
1993	215,452; 56.0%	—N/a	18,673; 4.9%	No candidate	107,595; 28.0%	32,576; 8.5%	10,494; 2.7%
1997	131,246; 32.9%	—	73,249; 18.4%	No candidate	139,431; 35.0%	52,270; 13.1%	2,519; 0.6%
2000	159,806; 41.3%	—	44,778; 11.6%	131; 0.0%	121,165; 31.3%	60,274; 15.6%	1,043; 0.3%
2004	169,111; 44.6%	115,021; 31.1%	76,234; 20.6%	12,407; 3.4%	Merged into Conservative Party		1,211; 0.3%
2006	159,393; 39.2%	145,719; 35.8%	89,217; 21.9%	9,739; 2.4%	Merged into Conservative Party		2,926; 0.7%
2008	119,197; 32.4%	145,132; 39.4%	80,525; 21.9%	22,683; 6.2%	Merged into Conservative Party		498; 0.1%
2011	87,880; 22.6%	170,319; 43.8%	115,616; 29.8%	12,319; 3.2%	Merged into Conservative Party		2,303; 0.6%
2015	227,764; 51.6%	112,070; 25.4%	81,105; 18.4%	20,551; 4.7%	Merged into Conservative Party		296; 0.1%
2019	164,970; 37.5%	144,229; 32.8%	41,212; 9.4%	75,738; 17.2%	Merged into Conservative Party		13,661; 3.1%
2021	168,941; 42.5%	133,643; 33.6%	47,369; 11.9%	20,162; 5.1%	Merged into Conservative Party		27,668; 7.0%
2025	250,659; 53.6%	190,429; 40.7%	13,626; 2.9%	7,982; 1.7%	Merged into Conservative Party		5,082; 1.1%

Votes by party in New Brunswick

Liberal Conservative New Democratic	Green Progressive Conservative (defunct) Alliance / Reform (defunct)

== 2021 ==
Electoral district	Candidates						Incumbent
Electoral district	Liberal	Conservative	NDP	Green	PPC	Other	Incumbent
Acadie—Bathurst	Serge Cormier; 27,817; 64.81%	Jean-Paul Lanteigne; 5,916; 13.78%	Mélissa Hébert; 4,906; 11.43%	Rachel Johns; 1,203; 2.80%	Kenneth Edward Langford; 2,531; 5.90%	Richer Doiron (FPC); 549; 1.28%	Serge Cormier
Beauséjour	Dominic LeBlanc; 27,313; 55.58%	Shelly Mitchell; 9,526; 19.38%	Evelyne Godfrey; 5,394; 10.98%	Stella Anna Girouard; 2,798; 5.69%	Jack Minor; 3,723; 7.58%	Isabelle Sauriol Chiasson (FPC); 391; 0.80%	Dominic LeBlanc
Fredericton	Jenica Atwin; 16,316; 37.03%	Andrea Johnson; 15,814; 35.89%	Shawn Oldenburg; 5,564; 12.63%	Nicole O'Byrne; 5,666; 12.86%		Brandon Kirby (Libert.); 234 0.53%	Jenica Atwin
Fredericton	Jenica Atwin; 16,316; 37.03%	Andrea Johnson; 15,814; 35.89%	Shawn Oldenburg; 5,564; 12.63%	Nicole O'Byrne; 5,666; 12.86%		June Patterson (Comm.); 158 0.36%	Jenica Atwin
Fredericton	Jenica Atwin; 16,316; 37.03%	Andrea Johnson; 15,814; 35.89%	Shawn Oldenburg; 5,564; 12.63%	Nicole O'Byrne; 5,666; 12.86%		Jen Smith (Ind.); 310 0.70%	Jenica Atwin
Fundy Royal	Whitney Dykeman; 11,075; 24.95%	Rob Moore; 21,460; 48.35%	Josh Floyd; 6,211; 13.99%	Tim Thompson; 2,189; 4.93%	Wayne Wheeler; 3,447; 7.77%		Rob Moore
Madawaska—Restigouche	René Arseneault; 16,854; 55.18%	Shawn Beaulieu; 7,892; 25.84%	Elizabeth MacDonald; 1,848; 6.05%	Rebecca Blaevoet; 786; 2.57%	Nancy Mercier; 1,889; 6.18%	Louis Berube (FPC); 1,277; 4.18%	René Arseneault
Miramichi—Grand Lake	Lisa Harris; 12,762; 39.26%	Jake Stewart; 14,218; 43.74%	Bruce Potter; 2,291; 7.05%	Patty Deitch; 1,393; 4.29%	Ron Nowlan; 1,839; 5.66%		Pat Finnigan$
Moncton—Riverview—Dieppe	Ginette Petitpas Taylor; 22,460; 49.08%	Darlene Smith; 10,692; 23.36%	Serge Landry; 7,774; 16.99%	Richard Dunn; 1,935; 4.23%	Lorilee Carrier; 2,901; 6.34%		Ginette Petitpas Taylor
New Brunswick Southwest	Jason Hickey; 8,750; 23.89%	John Williamson; 18,309; 49.98%	Richard Trevor Warren; 4,893; 13.36%	John Reist; 1,587; 4.33%	Meryl Sarty; 3,090; 8.44%		John Williamson
Saint John—Rothesay	Wayne Long; 17,375; 46.40%	Mel Norton; 12,315; 32.88%	Don Paulin; 4,816; 12.86%	Ann McAllister; 948; 2.53%	Nicholas Pereira; 1,996; 5.33%		Wayne Long
Tobique—Mactaquac	Cully Robinson; 8,223; 23.90%	Richard Bragdon; 17,536; 50.98%	Meriet Gray Miller; 3,656; 10.63%	Anthony Martin; 1,657; 4.82%	Daniel Joseph Waggoner; 2,930; 8.52%	Steven J LaForest (Ind.); 398; 1.16%	Richard Bragdon

== 2019 ==
Electoral district	Candidates						Incumbent
Electoral district	Liberal	Conservative	NDP	Green	PPC	Other	Incumbent
Acadie—Bathurst	Serge Cormier; 26,547; 55.14%	Martine Savoie; 10,352; 21.50%	Daniel Thériault; 6,967; 14.47%	Robert Kryszko; 4,277; 8.88%			Serge Cormier
Beauséjour	Dominic LeBlanc; 24,948; 46.47%	Vincent Cormier; 9,438; 17.58%	Jean-Marc Bélanger; 3,940; 7.34%	Laura Reinsborough; 14,305; 26.65%	Nancy Mercier; 1,054; 1.96%		Dominic LeBlanc
Fredericton	Matt DeCourcey; 13,544; 27.41%	Andrea Johnson; 15,011; 30.38%	Mackenzie Thomason; 2,946; 5.96%	Jenica Atwin; 16,640; 33.68%	Jason Paull; 776; 1.57%	Brandon Kirby (Libert.); 126; 0.26% Jacob Patterson (Comm.); 80; 0.16% Lesley Thomas (Animal); 286; 0.58%	Matt DeCourcey
Fundy Royal	Alaina Lockhart; 12,433; 25.56%	Rob Moore; 22,389; 46.02%	James Tolan; 4,804; 9.88%	Tim Thompson; 7,275; 14.95%	Rudy Neumayer; 1,249; 2.57%	David Raymond Amos (Ind.); 295; 0.61% John Evans (NCA); 201; 0.41%	Alaina Lockhart
Madawaska—Restigouche	René Arseneault; 17,331; 50.28%	Nelson Fox; 9,801; 28.43%	Chad Betteridge; 2,212; 6.42%	Louis Bérubé; 5,125; 14.87%			René Arseneault
Miramichi—Grand Lake	Pat Finnigan; 12,722; 36.77%	Peggy McLean; 12,352; 35.70%	Eileen Clancy Teslenko; 2,875; 8.31%	Patty Deitch; 3,914; 11.31%	Ron Nowlan; 1,179; 3.41%	Mathew Grant Lawson (Ind.); 396; 1.14% Allison MacKenzie (Ind.); 1,160; 3.35%	Pat Finnigan
Moncton—Riverview—Dieppe	Ginette Petitpas Taylor; 22,261; 42.95%	Sylvie Godin-Charest; 12,200; 23.54%	Luke MacLaren; 6,164; 11.89%	Claire Kelly; 9,287; 17.92%	Stephen Driver; 1,258; 2.43%	Brad MacDonald (Animal); 373; 0.72% Rhys Williams (CHP); 285; 0.55%	Ginette Petitpas Taylor
New Brunswick Southwest	Karen Ludwig; 10,110; 25.54%	John Williamson; 19,451; 49.15%	Douglas Mullin; 3,251; 8.21%	Susan Jonah; 5,352; 13.52%	Meryl Sarty; 1,214; 3.07%	Abe Scott (VCP); 200; 0.51%	Karen Ludwig
Saint John—Rothesay	Wayne Long; 15,443; 37.43%	Rodney Weston; 14,006; 33.95%	Armand Cormier; 5,046; 12.23%	Ann McAllister; 4,165; 10.10%	Adam J. C. Salesse; 1,260; 3.05%	Neville Barnett (Ind.); 150; 0.36% Stuart Jamieson (Ind.); 1,183; 2.87%	Wayne Long
Tobique—Mactaquac	Kelsey MacDonald; 9,631; 25.21%	Richard Bragdon; 19,229; 50.34%	Megan Aiken; 3,007; 7.87%	Rowan P. Miller; 5,398; 14.13%	Dominic Guay; 936; 2.45%		T. J. Harvey†

== 2015 ==
Electoral district	Candidates					Incumbent
Electoral district	Conservative	NDP	Liberal	Green	Independent	Incumbent
Acadie—Bathurst	Riba Girouard-Riordon; 3,852; 7.56%	Jason Godin; 20,079; 39.40%	Serge Cormier; 25,845; 50.71%	Dominique Breau; 1,187; 2.33%		Yvon Godin†
Beauséjour	Ann Bastarache; 6,017; 11.37%	Hélène Boudreau; 8,009; 15.13%	Dominic LeBlanc; 36,534; 69.02%	Kevin King; 2,376; 4.49%		Dominic LeBlanc
Fredericton	Keith Ashfield; 13,280; 28.42%	Sharon Scott-Levesque; 4,622; 9.89%	Matt DeCourcey; 23,016; 49.26%	Mary Lou Babineau; 5,804; 12.42%		Keith Ashfield
Fundy Royal	Rob Moore; 17,361; 37.08%	Jennifer McKenzie; 8,204; 17.52%	Alaina Lockhart; 19,136; 40.87%	Stephanie Coburn; 1,823; 3.89%	David Raymond Amos; 296; 0.63%	Rob Moore
Madawaska—Restigouche	Bernard Valcourt; 6,151; 16.49%	Rosaire L'Italien; 9,670; 25.92%	René Arseneault; 20,778; 55.70%	Françoise Aubin; 707; 1.90%		Bernard Valcourt
Miramichi—Grand Lake	Tilly O'Neill-Gordon; 12,476; 34.31%	Patrick Colford; 5,588; 15.37%	Pat Finnigan; 17,202; 47.31%	Matthew Ian Clark; 1,098; 3.02%		Tilly O'Neill-Gordon; Miramichi
Moncton—Riverview— Dieppe	Robert Goguen; 11,168; 21.46%	Luc LeBlanc; 8,420; 16.18%	Ginette Petitpas Taylor; 30,054; 57.75%	Luc Melanson; 2,399; 4.61%		Robert Goguen
New Brunswick Southwest	John Williamson; 14,625; 38.56%	Andrew Graham; 4,768; 12.57%	Karen Ludwig; 16,656; 43.92%	Gayla MacIntosh; 1,877; 4.95%		John Williamson
Saint John—Rothesay	Rodney Weston; 12,915; 30.55%	AJ Griffin; 7,411; 17.53%	Wayne Long; 20,634; 48.80%	Sharon Murphy; 1,321; 3.12%		Rodney Weston; Saint John
Tobique—Mactaquac	Richard Bragdon; 14,225; 37.02%	Robert Kitchen; 4,334; 11.28%	T. J. Harvey; 17,909; 46.61%	Terry Wishart; 1,959; 5.10%		Mike Allen†

== 2011 ==
Electoral district	Candidates					Incumbent
Electoral district	Conservative	Liberal	NDP	Green	Other	Incumbent
Acadie—Bathurst	Louis Robichaud; 7,456; 16.20%	Jean Marie Gionet; 6,491; 14.11%	Yvon Godin; 32,067; 69.69%			Yvon Godin
Beauséjour	Evelyne Chapman; 14,811; 33.27%	Dominic LeBlanc; 17,399; 39.08%	Susan Levi-Peters; 10,397; 23.35%	Nathalie Arsenault; 1,913; 4.30%		Dominic LeBlanc
Fredericton	Keith Ashfield; 21,573; 48.38%	Randy McKeen; 10,336; 23.18%	Jesse Travis; 10,626; 23.83%	Louise Anna-Marie Comeau; 1,790; 4.01%	Adam Scott Ness (Ind.); 266; 0.60%	Keith Ashfield
Fundy Royal	Rob Moore; 21,206; 58.14%	Linda Wilhelm; 3,668; 10.06%	Darryl Pitre; 9,845; 26.99%	Stephanie Coburn; 1,757; 4.82%		Rob Moore
Madawaska—Restigouche	Bernard Valcourt; 14,224; 40.64%	Jean-Claude JC D'Amours; 12,309; 35.17%	Widler Jules; 6,562; 18.75%	Lynn Morrison; 612; 1.75%	Louis Bérubé (Ind.); 1,290; 3.69%	Jean-Claude D'Amours
Miramichi	Tilly O'Neill Gordon; 16,112; 52.41%	Keith Vickers; 6,800; 22.12%	Patrick Colford; 7,097; 23.08%	Ronald Mazerolle; 735; 2.39%		Tilly O'Neill-Gordon
Moncton—Riverview— Dieppe	Robert Goguen; 17,408; 35.73%	Brian Murphy; 15,247; 32.19%	Shawna Gagné; 14,053; 28.84%	Steven Steeves; 2,016; 4.14%		Brian Murphy
New Brunswick Southwest	John Williamson; 18,066; 56.64%	Kelly Wilson; 4,320; 13.54%	Andrew Graham; 7,413; 23.24%	Janice Harvey; 1,646; 5.16%	Jason Farris (CHP); 450; 1.41%	Greg Thompson†
Saint John	Rodney Weston; 18,456; 49.73%	Stephen Chase; 5,964; 16.07%	Rob Moir; 11,382; 30.67%	Sharon Murphy-Flatt; 1,017; 2.74%	Arthur Jr. Watson (Ind.); 294; 0.79%	Rodney Weston
Tobique—Mactaquac	Mike Allen; 21,108; 62.70%	Chuck Chiasson; 5,337; 15.85%	Pierre Cyr; 6,388; 18.98%	Rish McGlynn; 831; 2.47%		Mike Allen

== 2008 ==
Electoral district	Candidates					Incumbent
Electoral district	Conservative	Liberal	NDP	Green	Other	Incumbent
Acadie— Bathurst	Jean Guy Dubé; 8,331; 18.54%	Odette Robichaud; 9,850; 21.92%	Yvon Godin; 25,849; 57.53%	Michelle Aubin; 904; 2.01%		Yvon Godin
Beauséjour	Omer Leger; 12,506; 29.16%	Dominic LeBlanc; 20,059; 46.76%	Chris Durrant; 7,242; 16.88%	Michael Milligan; 3,087; 7.20%		Dominic LeBlanc
Fredericton	Keith Ashfield; 17,962; 42.53%	David Innes; 13,319; 31.54%	Jesse Travis; 6,490; 15.37%	Mary Lou Babineau; 4,293; 10.17%	Ben Kelly (CAP); 168; 0.40%	Andy Scott†
Fundy Royal	Rob Moore; 17,211; 51.63%	Mark Wright; 5,773; 17.32%	Rob Moir; 7,907; 23.72%	Erik Matthew Millett; 2,443; 7.33%		Rob Moore
Madawaska— Restigouche	Jean-Pierre Ouellet; 11,402; 33.23%	Jean-Claude JC D'Amours; 16,266; 47.40%	Thérèse Tremblay-Philippe; 5,361; 15.62%	André Arpin; 1,287; 3.75%		Jean-Claude D'Amours
Miramichi	Tilly O'Neill-Gordon; 12,058; 42.08%	Charles Hubbard; 10,590; 36.95%	Donald A. Doucet; 4,904; 17.11%	Todd Smith; 1,105; 3.86%		Charles Hubbard
Moncton— Riverview— Dieppe	Daniel Allain; 16,297; 35.83%	Brian Murphy; 17,797; 39.13%	Carl Bainbridge; 7,394; 16.26%	Alison Ménard; 3,998; 8.79%		Brian Murphy
New; Brunswick; Southwest	Greg Thompson; 17,474; 58.32%	Nancy MacIntosh; 5,863; 19.57%	Andrew Graham; 4,958; 16.55%	Robert Wayne Boucher; 1,667; 5.56%		Greg Thompson
Saint John	Rodney Weston; 13,782; 39.55%	Paul Zed; 13,285; 38.13%	Tony Mowery; 5,560; 15.96%	Mike Richardson; 1,888; 5.42%	Michael Moffat (Mar.); 330; 0.95%	Paul Zed
Tobique— Mactaquac	Mike Allen; 18,071; 57.40%	Sally McGrath; 6,773; 21.51%	Alice Finnamore; 4,830; 15.34%	Mark Glass; 1,810; 5.75%		Mike Allen

== 2006 ==
Conservative Mike Allen defeated incumbent MP Andy Savoy in Tobique—Mactaquac. In the open seat of Moncton—Riverview—Dieppe, formerly held by Claudette Bradshaw, Brian Murphy kept the seat for the Liberals. There was no change elsewhere.

Electoral district	Candidates					Incumbent
Electoral district	Liberal	Conservative	NDP	Green	Other	Incumbent
Acadie—Bathurst	Marcelle Mersereau; 15,504; 30.71%	Serge Savoie; 8,513; 16.86%	Yvon Godin; 25,195; 49.90%	Philippe Rousselle; 699; 1.38%	Ulric DeGrâce (Ind.); 219 0.43%	Yvon Godin
Acadie—Bathurst	Marcelle Mersereau; 15,504; 30.71%	Serge Savoie; 8,513; 16.86%	Yvon Godin; 25,195; 49.90%	Philippe Rousselle; 699; 1.38%	Eric Landry (Ind.); 362 0.72%	Yvon Godin
Beauséjour	Dominic LeBlanc; 22,012; 47.55%	Omer Leger; 14,919; 32.23%	Neil Gardner; 7,717; 16.67%	Anna Girouard; 1,290; 2.79%	J. Frank Comeau (Ind.); 357; 0.77%	Dominic LeBlanc
Fredericton	Andy Scott; 19,649; 41.80%	Pat Lynch; 16,292; 34.66%	John Carty; 9,988; 21.25%	Philip Duchastel; 884; 1.88%	David Raymond Amos (Ind.); 198; 0.42%	Andy Scott
Fundy Royal	Eldon Hunter; 9,979; 27.34%	Rob Moore; 17,630; 48.31%	Rob Moir; 7,696; 21.09%	Patty Donovan; 1,189; 3.26%		Rob Moore
Madawaska—Restigouche	Jean-Claude J. C. D'Amours; 13,734; 38.02%	Jean-Pierre Ouellet; 12,849; 35.57%	Rodolphe Martin; 8,322; 23.04%	Irka Laplante; 1,220; 3.38%		Jean-Claude D'Amours
Miramichi	Charles Isaac Hubbard; 13,960; 42.27%	Mike Morrison; 11,250; 34.07%	Jeannette Manuel-Allain; 5,587; 16.92%	John Welsford Bethell; 587; 1.78%	Danny Gay (Ind.); 1,640; 4.97%	Charles Hubbard
Moncton—Riverview—Dieppe	Brian Murphy; 22,918; 47.71%	Charles Doucet; 14,464; 30.11%	David Hackett; 9,095; 18.93%	Camille Labchuk; 1,409; 2.93%	Ron Pomerleau (CAP); 150; 0.31%	Claudette Bradshaw†
New Brunswick Southwest	Stan Smith; 8,877; 26.79%	Greg Thompson; 18,155; 54.80%	Andrew Graham; 5,178; 15.63%	Erik Millett; 922; 2.78%		Greg Thompson
Saint John	Paul Zed; 17,202; 42.92%	John Wallace; 15,753; 39.30%	Terry Albright; 6,267; 15.64%	Vern M. Garnett; 858; 2.14%		Paul Zed
Tobique—Mactaquac	Andy Savoy; 15,558; 42.86%	Mike Allen; 15,894; 43.78%	Alice Finnamore; 4,172; 11.49%	Robert Bérubé Jr. 679; 1.87%		Andy Savoy

== 2004 ==
The Liberals held three seats in the Anglophone south (Fredericton, Fundy and Tobique-Mactaquac), believed to be most vulnerable to the Conservatives. Despite heavy targeting, the Conservatives only managed to reclaim Fundy from John Herron (who defected from the old PC party in 2003). They lost the adjacent seat of Saint John, vacated by the retiring Elsie Wayne, making for a net Liberal gain.

Electoral district	Candidates					Incumbent
Electoral district	Liberal	Conservative	NDP	Green	Other	Incumbent
Acadie—Bathurst	Serge Rousselle; 14,452; 32.67%	Joel E. Bernard; 4,841; 10.94%	Yvon Godin; 23,857; 53.93%	Mario Lanteigne; 1,085; 2.45%		Yvon Godin
Beauséjour	Dominic LeBlanc; 21,934; 53.28%	Angela Vautour; 11,604; 28.19%	Omer Bourque; 6,056; 14.71%	Anna Girouard; 1,574; 3.82%		Dominic LeBlanc
Fredericton	Andy Scott; 19,819; 46.78%	Kent Fox; 14,193; 33.50%	John Carty; 7,360; 17.37%	Daron Letts; 997; 2.35%		Andy Scott
Fundy	John Herron; 11,635; 34.77%	Rob Moore; 14,997; 44.82%	Pat Hanratty; 5,417; 16.19%	Karin Bach; 1,051; 3.14%	David Raymond Amos (Ind.); 358; 1.07%	John Herron (Note: Herron was formerly PC, sat until dissolution as an independent, then ran as a Liberal.)
Madawaska—Restigouche	Jean-Claude J.C. D'Amours; 14,144; 44.66%	Benoit Violette; 7,605; 24.01%	Rodolphe Martin; 8,737; 27.59%	Jovette Cyr; 1,185; 3.74%		Jeannot Castonguay†
Miramichi	Charles Isaac Hubbard; 15,647; 48.08%	Michael J. Morrison; 9,448; 29.03%	Hilaire Rousselle; 5,980; 18.38%	Gary Sanipass; 1,468; 4.51%		Charles Hubbard
Moncton—Riverview—Dieppe	Claudette Bradshaw; 25,266; 59.29%	Jean LeBlanc; 10,003; 23.48%	Hélène Lapointe; 5,344; 12.54%	Judith Hamel; 1,998; 4.69%		Claudette Bradshaw
St. Croix—Belleisle	Jim Dunlap; 9,702; 31.51%	Greg Thompson; 16,339; 53.06%	Patrick Webber; 3,600; 11.69%	Erik Matthew Millett; 960; 3.12%	David Szemerda (CAP); 194; 0.63%	Greg Thompson
Saint John	Paul Zed; 15,725; 43.28%	Bob McVicar; 12,212; 33.62%	Terry Albright; 6,926; 19.06%	Jonathan Cormier; 807; 2.22%	Tom Oland (Ind.); 290 0.80%	Elsie Wayne†
Saint John	Paul Zed; 15,725; 43.28%	Bob McVicar; 12,212; 33.62%	Terry Albright; 6,926; 19.06%	Jonathan Cormier; 807; 2.22%	Jim Wood (Mar.); 369 1.02%	Elsie Wayne†
Tobique—Mactaquac	Andy Savoy; 16,787; 48.23%	Mike Allen; 13,779; 39.59%	Jason Mapplebeck; 2,957; 8.50%	Scott Jones; 1,282; 3.68%		Andy Savoy

=== Maps ===
1. Acadie-Bathurst
2. Beauséjour
3. Fredericton
4. Fundy
5. Madawaska-Restigouche
6. Miramichi
7. Moncton-Riverview-Dieppe
8. St. Croix-Belleisle
9. Saint John
10. Tobique-Mactaquac

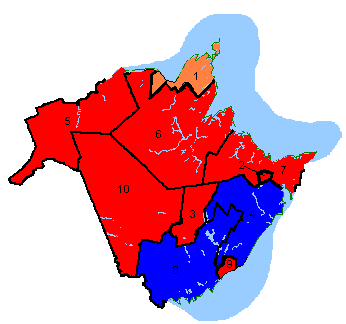
Key map

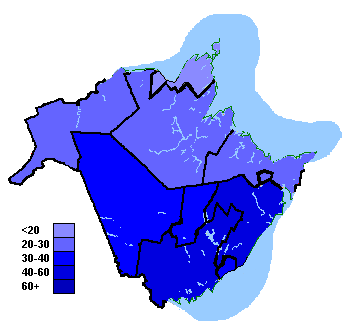
Conservative Party of Canada

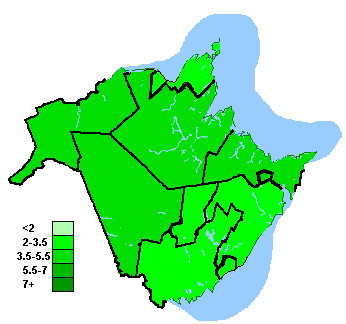
Green Party of Canada

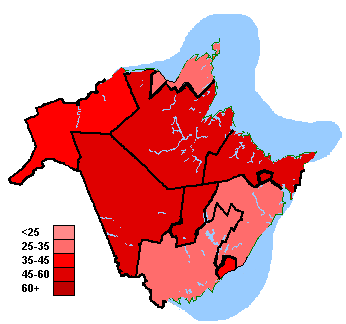
Liberal Party of Canada

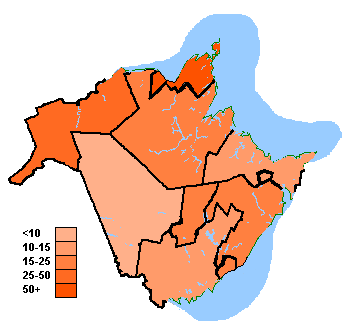
New Democratic Party

== 2000 ==
Electoral district	Candidates					Incumbent
Electoral district	Liberal	Canadian Alliance	NDP	PC	Other	Incumbent
Acadie—Bathurst	Bernard Thériault; 20,362; 40.27%	Jean Gauvin; 2,314; 4.58%	Yvon Godin; 23,568; 46.61%	Alcide Leger; 4,321; 8.55%		Yvon Godin
Beausejour—Petitcodiac	Dominic LeBlanc; 21,465; 47.10%	Tom Taylor; 6,256; 13.73%	Inka Milewski; 3,217; 7.06%	Angela Vautour; 18,716; 32.11%		Angela Vautour (Note: Vautour defected from the NDP in 1999.)
Fredericton	Andy Scott; 14,175; 38.60%	Allan D. Neill; 8,814; 24.00%	Michael Dunn; 2,584; 7.04%	Raj Venugopal; 10,919; 29.73%	William H. Parker (NLP); 233; 0.63%	Andy Scott
Fundy—Royal	John King; 11,422; 30.28%	Rob Moore; 8,392; 22.25%	John Calder; 2,628; 6.97%	John Herron; 15,279; 40.51%		John Herron
Madawaska—Restigouche	Jeannot Castonguay; 19,913; 52.27%	Scott Chedore; 1,958; 5.14%	Claude J. Albert; 1,811; 4.75%	Jean F. Dubé; 14,417; 37.84%		Jean F. Dubé
Miramichi	Charles Hubbard; 17,047; 51.44%	Ken Clark; 5,298; 15.99%	Allan Goodfellow; 2,453; 7.40%	David Kelly; 8,341; 25.17%		Charles Hubbard
Moncton—Riverview—Dieppe	Claudette Bradshaw; 26,545; 58.74%	Kathryn M. Barnes; 8,130; 17.99%	Hélène Lapointe; 3,139; 6.95%	Serge Landry; 7,082; 15.67%	Laurent Maltais (NLP); 297; 0.66%	Claudette Bradshaw
New Brunswick Southwest	Winston Gamblin; 8,442; 27.53%	John Erbs; 6,562; 21.40%	Habib Kilisli; 1,173; 3.83%	Greg Thompson; 14,489; 47.25%		Greg Thompson
Saint John	Paul Zed; 9,535; 28.98%	Peter Touchbourne; 2,980; 9.06%	Rod Hill; 2,989; 9.09%	Elsie Wayne; 16,751; 50.92%	Miville Couture (NLP); 52 0.16% Vern M. Garnett (Green); 131 0.40% Jim Wood (Mar.); 461 1.40%	Elsie Wayne
Tobique—Mactaquac	Andy Savoy; 10,897; 33.60%	Adam Richardson; 9,573; 29.51%	Carolyn Van Dine; 1,216; 3.75%	Gilles Bernier; 10,750; 33.14%		Gilles Bernier
