= Roland Beaulieu =

Canadian politician

MLA for Edmundston
- In office 1986–1995
- Preceded by: Jean-Maurice Simard
- Succeeded by: Bernard Valcourt

Personal details
- Born: December 21, 1944 (age 81) Kilburn, New Brunswick
- Party: New Brunswick Liberal Association

Roland Beaulieu (born December 21, 1944) holds a Bachelor of Commerce degree from the Edmundston Campus of the University of Moncton. He graduated from Cormier High School as Class President in 1962. After working as an assistant Industrial Commissioner, he served as a Canadian politician in the Legislative Assembly of New Brunswick from 1986 to 1995, as a Liberal member for the constituency of Edmundston.
