= Jean-Maurice Simard =

Canadian accountant and politician (1931-2001)

The Honourable Jean-Maurice Simard

Senator for Edmundston, New Brunswick
- In office June 26, 1985 – June 16, 2001
- Appointed by: Brian Mulroney

Member of the Legislative Assembly of New Brunswick for Edmundston
- In office 1970–1985
- Preceded by: Fernand Nadeau
- Succeeded by: Robert Beaulieu

Personal details
- Born: June 21, 1931 Rivière-Bleue, Quebec, Canada
- Died: June 16, 2001 (aged 69)
- Party: Progressive Conservative
- Spouse: Francine Fréchette
- Relations: J. Evariste Simard, father & Marie-Anna Ouellet, mother
- Children: 1 son, 2 daughters
- Education: University of Ottawa; McGill University
- Occupation: Chartered Accountant, Politician

Jean-Maurice Simard (June 21, 1931 – June 16, 2001) was a Canadian Chartered Accountant and politician remembered as a strong promoter of French language rights and defender of Canadian bilingualism.

He was born in Rivière-Bleue, Quebec in the Bas-Saint-Laurent region near Maine and New Brunswick. He studied at the University of Ottawa in Ottawa, Ontario and McGill University in Montreal. A chartered accountant, he practiced in Edmundston, New Brunswick.

Jean-Maurice Simard was the brother of politician Montcalm Simard, who was a Union Nationale member of the National Assembly of Quebec from 1966 to 1973.

== Federal politics ==
In the 1968 federal election, he ran unsuccessfully as the Progressive Conservative candidate in the riding of Madawaska—Victoria to his Liberal opponent, Eymard Corbin.

== Member of the Provincial Legislature ==
He ran as a Progressive Conservative and was elected to the Legislative Assembly of New Brunswick representing the riding of Edmundston in the 1970 election. He was re-elected in 1974, 1978, and 1982. He was the Minister of Finance (from 1970 to 1974), Chair of the Treasury Board (from 1976 to 1978) and Minister for Public Service Reform (from 1982 to 1985).

== Senator ==
In 1985, he resigned his seat to the legislature to accept an appointment by Canadian Prime Minister Brian Mulroney to the Senate of Canada representing the senatorial division of Edmundston. He sat with the Progressive Conservative caucus, except for the period from March 15 to June 30, 1988 when he sat as an Independent Progressive Conservative.

Jean-Maurice Simard died in office in 2001.

New Brunswick provincial government of Richard Hatfield
Cabinet posts (2)
Predecessor	Office	Successor
N/A	'Minister of Public Service Reform'; 1982–1985	N/A
Lestock G. DesBrisay	'Minister of Finance'; 1970–1974	A. Edison Stairs
