= Edmundston-Vallée-des-Rivières =

Provincial electoral district in New Brunswick, Canada

New Brunswick electoral district
- The riding of Edmundston-Vallée-des-Rivières (as it exists from 2023) in relation to other New Brunswick electoral districts
- Coordinates: 47.466°N 68.060°W

Provincial electoral district
- Legislature: Legislative Assembly of New Brunswick
MLA
Jean-Claude D'Amours
Liberal
- District created: 1996
- First contested: 1996
- Last contested: 2024

Demographics
- Population (2011): 13,273
- Electors (2013): 11,196

Edmundston-Vallée-des-Rivières is a provincial electoral district for the Legislative Assembly of New Brunswick, Canada.

The riding was created in the 2006 redistribution with very similar boundaries to the previous Edmundston riding, and was given the name Edmundston-Saint Basile to reflect the fact that the district no longer included all of the city of Edmundston as the city had absorbed several outlying communities in an amalgamation in 1995. The name reflected the fact that the district included the old city of Edmundston as well as the old town of Saint Basile.

In 2013, it ceded some more of Edmundston to the neighbouring Madawaska les Lacs-Edmundston, while adding rural territory to the north, east, and south of Edmundston. It was accordingly renamed Edmundston-Madawaska Centre.

Following the 2023 redistribution, the riding was renamed Edmundston-Vallée-des-Rivières.

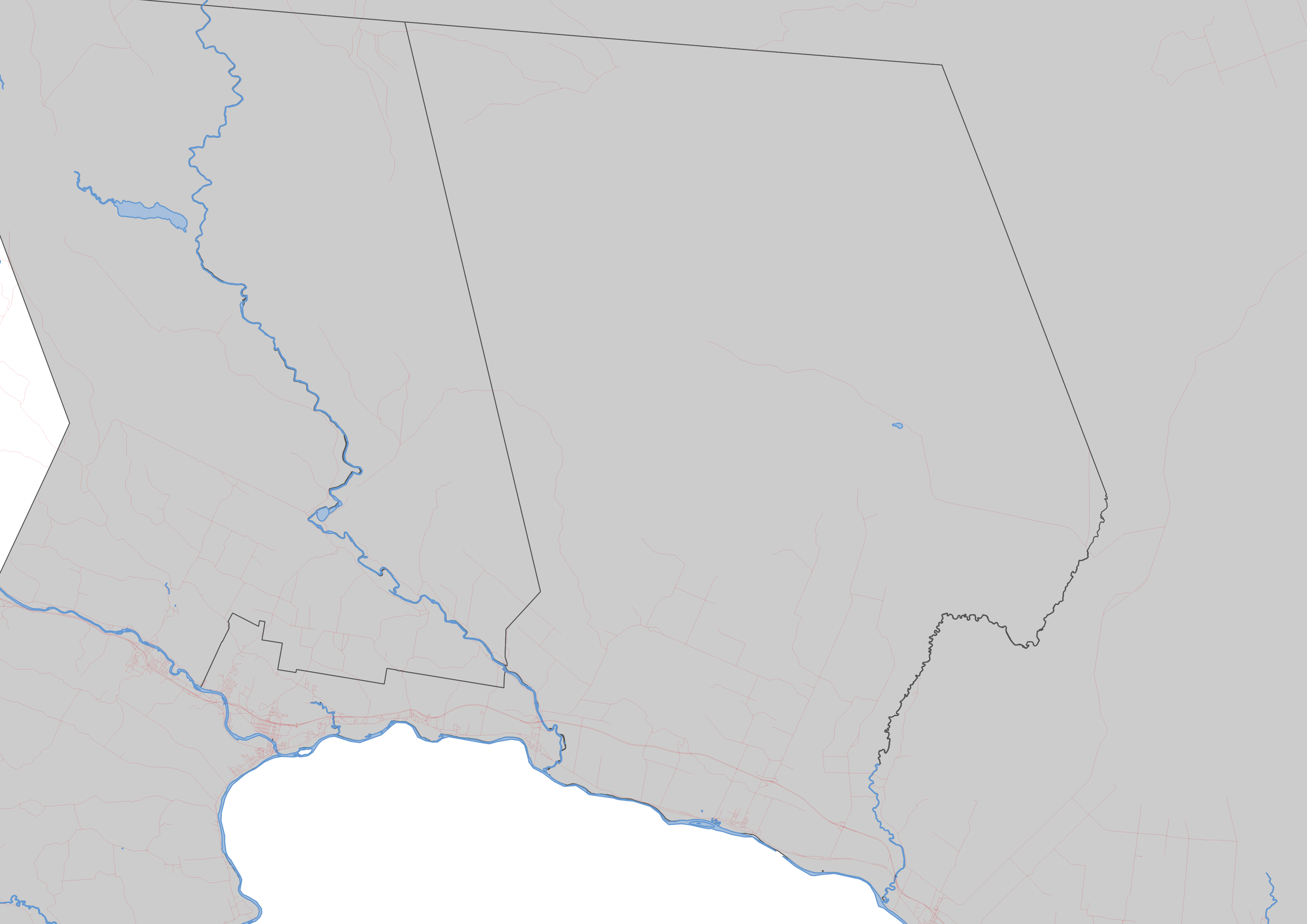
The riding of Edmundston-Vallée-des-Rivières (as it exists from 2023) in relation to other New Brunswick electoral districts

== Members of the Legislative Assembly ==
Assembly	Years	Member	Party
Edmundston-Saint-Basile
Riding created from Edmundston
56th	2006–2010	Madeleine Dubé	Progressive Conservative
57th	2010–2014	Madeleine Dubé	Progressive Conservative
Edmundston-Madawaska Centre
58th	2014–2018	Madeleine Dubé	Progressive Conservative
59th	2018–2020	Jean-Claude D'Amours	Liberal
60th	2020–2024	Jean-Claude D'Amours	Liberal
Edmundston-Vallée-des-Rivières
61st	2024–Present	Jean-Claude D'Amours	Liberal

== Election results ==
=== Edmundston-Madawaska Centre, 2014–present ===
2024 New Brunswick general election
Party	Candidate	Votes	%	±%
Liberal	Jean-Claude D'Amours	5,573	81.9%	+7.43
Progressive Conservative	Roger Quimper	1,049	15.4%	-4.23
Social Justice	Sylvain Gerald Voisine	186	2.7%	
Total valid votes		6,808		
Total rejected ballots				
Turnout				
Eligible voters				
Source: Elections New Brunswick

2020 New Brunswick general election
Party	Candidate	Votes	%	±%
Liberal	Jean-Claude D'Amours	5,236	74.47	+7.91
Progressive Conservative	Joanne Bérubé Gagné	1,380	19.63	-0.86
Green	Marco Morency	415	5.90	-4.11
Total valid votes		7,031	99.14	
Total rejected ballots		61	0.86	
Turnout		7,092	63.10	
Eligible voters		11,240		
Liberal hold		Swing		+4.39

2018 New Brunswick general election
Party	Candidate	Votes	%	±%
Liberal	Jean-Claude D'Amours	4,668	66.56	+21.59
Progressive Conservative	Gérald Levesque	1,437	20.49	-27.67
Green	Sophie Vaillancourt	702	10.01	--
New Democratic	Anne-Marie Comeau	206	2.94	-3.93
Total valid votes		7,013	100.0	
Total rejected ballots		80		
Turnout		7,093	62.64	
Eligible voters		11,323		

2014 New Brunswick general election
Party	Candidate	Votes	%	±%
Progressive Conservative	Madeleine "Mado" Dubé	3,666	48.16	-27.73
Liberal	Michel LeBlond	3,423	44.97	+26.39
New Democratic	Alain Martel	523	6.87	+3.82
Total valid votes		7,612	100.0	
Total rejected ballots		76	0.99	
Turnout		7,688	67.78	
Eligible voters		11,343		
Progressive Conservative notional hold		Swing		-27.06

=== Edmundston-Saint Basile, 2006–2013 ===
2010 New Brunswick general election
Party	Candidate	Votes	%	±%
Progressive Conservative	Madeleine Dubé	5,551	75.89	+4.34
Liberal	Michelle Daigle	1,359	18.58	-6.83
New Democratic	Michel Thébeau	223	3.05	±0
Green	Michelle Simard	182	2.49	–
Total valid votes		7,315	100.0	
Total rejected ballots		118	1.59	
Turnout		7,433	69.85	
Eligible voters		10,642		
Progressive Conservative hold		Swing		+5.58

2006 New Brunswick general election
Party	Candidate	Votes	%	±%
Progressive Conservative	Madeleine Dubé	5,631	71.54	
Liberal	Jean Louis Johnson	2,000	25.41	
New Democratic	Michel Bossé	240	3.05	
Total valid votes		7,871	100.0	

== See also ==
- List of New Brunswick provincial electoral districts
- Canadian provincial electoral districts
