= Campbellton-Restigouche Centre =

Defunct provincial electoral district in New Brunswick, Canada

New Brunswick electoral district
- Coordinates: 47.974°N 66.741°W

Defunct provincial electoral district
- Legislature: Legislative Assembly of New Brunswick
- District created: 1967
- First contested: 1967
- Last contested: 2010

Demographics
- Population (2006): 13,524
- Electors (2010): 9,743

Campbellton-Restigouche Centre was a provincial electoral district for the Legislative Assembly of New Brunswick, Canada.

The riding was created as Campbellton in the 1967 redistribution when cities were removed from county districts and is made up of the city of Campbellton and the villages of Tide Head and Atholville and their surrounding areas. It returned one member from its inception and was unchanged in the 1973 redistribution when New Brunswick moved exclusively to single member districts.

The riding was again largely unchanged in the 1994 redistribution. In the 2006 redistribution it gained some geographical territory from the parts of Restigouche County to its south and was renamed as a result.

== Members of the Legislative Assembly ==
Assembly	Years	Member	Party
Campbellton; Riding created from Restigouche
46th	1967–1970	Lewis C. Ayles	Progressive Conservative
47th	1970–1974†	Charles Van Horne	Progressive Conservative
48th	1974–1978	Fernand Dubé	Progressive Conservative
49th	1978–1982	Fernand Dubé	Progressive Conservative
50th	1982–1987	Fernand Dubé	Progressive Conservative
51st	1987–1991	Edmond Blanchard	Liberal
52nd	1991–1995	Edmond Blanchard	Liberal
53rd	1995–1999	Edmond Blanchard	Liberal
54th	1999–2001	Edmond Blanchard	Liberal
54th	2001–2003	Jean F. Dubé	Progressive Conservative
55th	2003–2006	Roy Boudreau	Liberal
Campbellton-Restigouche Centre
56th	2006–2010	Roy Boudreau	Liberal
57th	2010–2014	Greg Davis	Progressive Conservative
Riding dissolved into Campbellton-Dalhousie and Restigouche West

== Election results ==
=== Campbellton-Restigouche Centre ===
2010 New Brunswick general election
Party	Candidate	Votes	%	±%
Progressive Conservative	Greg Davis	3,914	54.92	+10.86
Liberal	Roy Boudreau	2,453	34.42	-21.52
New Democratic	Widler Jules	524	7.35	–
Green	Lynn Morrison Hemson	236	3.31	–
Total valid votes		7,127	100.0	
Total rejected ballots		77	1.07	
Turnout		7,204	73.94	
Eligible voters		9,743		
Progressive Conservative gain from Liberal		Swing		+16.19

2006 New Brunswick general election
Party	Candidate	Votes	%	±%
Liberal	Roy Boudreau	4,184	55.94	-0.56
Progressive Conservative	Greg Davis	3,296	44.06	+4.72
Total valid votes		7,480	100.0	
Total rejected ballots		85	1.12	
Turnout		7,565	70.85	
Eligible voters		10,678		
Liberal notional hold		Swing		-2.64

=== Campbellton ===
2003 New Brunswick general election
Party	Candidate	Votes	%	±%
Liberal	Roy Boudreau	3,979	56.50	+18.25
Progressive Conservative	Jean F. Dubé	2,771	39.34	-19.19
New Democratic	Murray Mason	293	4.16	+0.94
Total valid votes		7,043	100.0	
Liberal gain from Progressive Conservative		Swing		+18.72

New Brunswick provincial by-election, February 5, 2001 Edmond Blanchard appointed to Federal Court of Canada
Party	Candidate	Votes	%	±%
Progressive Conservative	Jean F. Dubé	3,541	58.53	+22.77
Liberal	Arnold Firlotte	2,314	38.25	-21.89
New Democratic	Claude J. Albert	195	3.22	-0.89
Total valid votes		6,050	100.0	
Progressive Conservative gain from Liberal		Swing		+22.33

1999 New Brunswick general election
Party	Candidate	Votes	%	±%
Liberal	Edmond Blanchard	4,321	60.14	-9.63
Progressive Conservative	Pierre F. Dubé	2,569	35.76	+18.33
New Democratic	Johanne Parent	295	4.11	-2.03
Total valid votes		7,185	100.0	
Liberal hold		Swing		-13.98

1995 New Brunswick general election
Party	Candidate	Votes	%	±%
Liberal	Edmond Blanchard	4,831	69.77	+11.61
Progressive Conservative	Florent Jim Levesque	1,207	17.43	+2.34
New Democratic	Louis Renaud	425	6.14	-3.44
Confederation of Regions	Harold I. Hargrove	368	5.31	-11.85
Natural Law	Laurent Maltais	93	1.34	–
Total valid votes		6,924	100.0	
Liberal hold		Swing		+4.64

1991 New Brunswick general election
Party	Candidate	Votes	%	±%
Liberal	Edmond Blanchard	3,599	58.16	-3.98
Confederation of Regions	Ronald Rioux	1,062	17.16	–
Progressive Conservative	Bill Ferguson	934	15.09	-17.51
New Democratic	Douglas Gordon Kingston	593	9.58	+4.32
Total valid votes		6,188	100.0	
Liberal hold		Swing		-10.57

1987 New Brunswick general election
Party	Candidate	Votes	%	±%
Liberal	Edmond Blanchard	4,278	62.14	+26.59
Progressive Conservative	Fernand G. Dubé	2,244	32.60	-23.84
New Democratic	Clara I. MacMillan	362	5.26	-2.75
Total valid votes		6,884	100.0	
Liberal gain from Progressive Conservative		Swing		+25.22

1982 New Brunswick general election
Party	Candidate	Votes	%	±%
Progressive Conservative	Fernand G. Dubé	3,917	56.44	+9.86
Liberal	Lumina Senechal	2,467	35.55	-6.48
New Democratic	John F. "Lofty" MacMillan	556	8.01	+2.37
Total valid votes		6,940	100.0	
Progressive Conservative hold		Swing		+8.17

1978 New Brunswick general election
Party	Candidate	Votes	%	±%
Progressive Conservative	Fernand G. Dubé	2,734	46.58	-7.10
Liberal	J. H. Wilfred Senechal	2,467	42.03	+1.40
Parti acadien	Paul Aubin	337	5.74	–
New Democratic	Bryce Andrew	331	5.64	-0.05
Total valid votes		5,869	100.0	
Progressive Conservative hold		Swing		-4.25

New Brunswick provincial by-election, 30 September 1974 on the resignation of Charles Van Horne, 19 February 1974
Party	Candidate	Votes	%	±%
Progressive Conservative	Fernand G. Dubé	2,870	53.68	-0.08
Liberal	Maurice J. Harquail	2,172	40.63	-4.99
New Democratic	Harold J. Steeves	304	5.69	–
Total valid votes		5,346	100.0	
Progressive Conservative hold		Swing		+2.46
This by-election replaced the general election, which was held on 18 November 1974.

1970 New Brunswick general election
Party	Candidate	Votes	%	±%
Progressive Conservative	J. C. Van Horne	3,189	53.76	-3.41
Liberal	John W. MacDonald	2,706	45.62	+2.79
Independent	J. H. Wilfred Senechal	37	0.62	–
Total valid votes		5,932	100.0	
Progressive Conservative hold		Swing		-3.10

1967 New Brunswick general election
Party	Candidate	Votes	%
Progressive Conservative	Louis C. Ayles	3,247	57.17
Liberal	Keith Thompson	2,433	42.83
Total valid votes		5,680	100.0

== See also ==
- List of New Brunswick provincial electoral districts
- Canadian provincial electoral districts
