= Guillaume Deschênes-Thériault =

Canadian politician (born 1994)

Guillaume Deschênes-Thériault MP
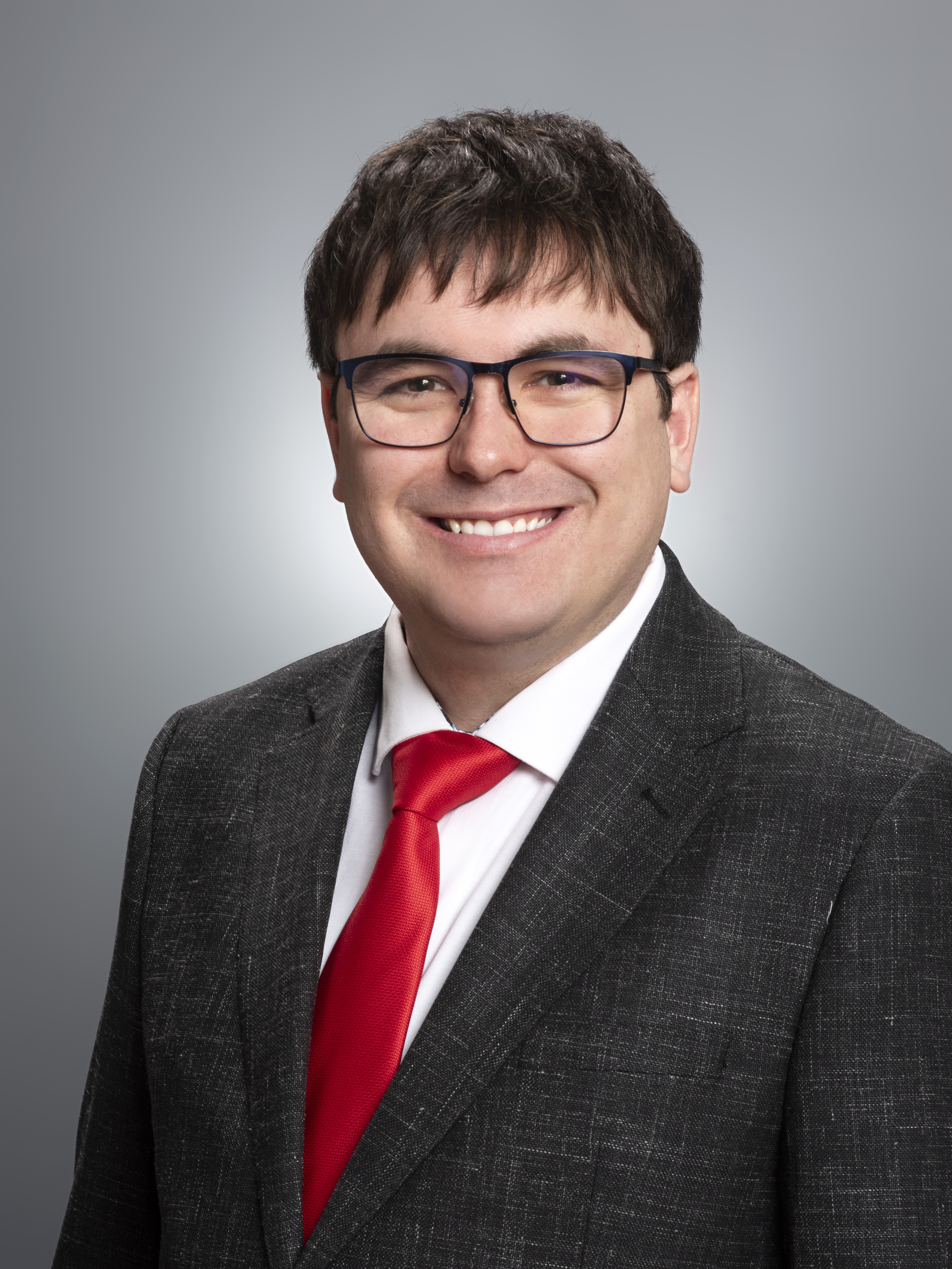

Member of Parliament for Madawaska—Restigouche
- Incumbent
- Assumed office April 28, 2025
- Preceded by: René Arseneault

Personal details
- Born: June 11, 1994 (age 32)
- Party: Liberal
- Website: guillaumedeschenestheriault.liberal.ca

Guillaume Deschênes-Thériault MP is a Canadian politician from the Liberal Party of Canada. He was elected Member of Parliament for Madawaska—Restigouche in the 2025 Canadian federal election. From 2021 to 2025, he served as a municipal councillor for the rural community of Kedgwick.

== Biography ==
Guillaume Deschênes-Thériault was born on June 11, 1994. He grew up in Kedgwick, New Brunswick, and graduated from Marie-Gaétane High School.

As he began his university studies, Deschênes-Thériault became a leading figure in New Brunswick's protest movement against the Employment Insurance reform implemented by Stephen Harper's government.

During his undergraduate studies, Deschênes-Thériault worked for the Organizing Committee of the Centennial Celebrations of Kedgwick. He co-wrote a book on the history of the village, which is a collection of the history of over 200 pioneer families. The book was published by Éditions de la Francophonie in 2015.

Deschênes-Thériault has also been involved in the protection and promotion of the French language and Acadian culture. He notably served as president of a local branch of the Société de l'Acadie du Nouveau-Brunswick.

He holds a bachelor's degree in political science from the Université de Moncton and a master's degree in Canadian Politics from the University of Ottawa. He also completed his doctoral studies at the University of Ottawa and is in the process of completing his doctoral thesis.

In 2020, he moved back to Kedgwick with his wife Stéphanie Bacher. She died in September 2023 at the age of 34 from cancer.

Professionally, before being elected as a Member of Parliament, Deschênes-Thériault was a research associate at the Sociopol research firm. His area of expertise is Canadian francophonie. He has completed several projects for the federal government, provincial governments, and community organizations across Canada. Additionally, for nearly two years, Deschênes-Thériault was a columnist for Francopresse, and his articles on federal political news were regularly featured in French-language newspapers across the country. In the Restigouche-West area, he is also known for his weekly political commentary on FM Route 17 radio.

== Political career ==
In the 2021 municipal elections in New Brunswick, Deschênes-Thériault was elected by acclamation as a municipal councillor for the rural community of Kedgwick. He resigned from his position in April 2025.

In September 2024, Deschênes-Thériault announced his intention to seek the Liberal nomination in the Madawaska—Restigouche riding, after MP René Arseneault announced that he would not seek re-election. At the close of the nomination period on November 25, 2024, he was the only candidate and was therefore confirmed by acclamation as the Liberal candidate.

He was elected as Member of Parliament for Madawaska—Restigouche in the 2025 federal election with 55.2% of the vote.

== Electoral record ==
2025 Canadian federal election: Madawaska—Restigouche
Party	Candidate	Votes	%	±%	Expenditures
Liberal	Guillaume Deschênes-Thériault	22,720	55.18	+3.19	$50,042.24
Conservative	Michel Morin	16,320	39.63	+11.86	$36,298.58
New Democratic	Daisy Petersen	1,251	3.04	−3.12	$22.50
People's	Nancy Mercier	887	2.15	−5.39	$0.00
Total valid votes/expense limit		41,178	99.04	+0.36	$124,253.18
Total rejected ballots		398	0.96	–0.36	
Turnout		41,576	70.29		
Eligible voters		59,149			
Liberal notional hold		Swing		−4.34	
Source: Elections Canada
Note: number of eligible voters does not include voting day registrations.
