= Lewis C. Ayles =

Canadian politician

Member of the Legislative Assembly of New Brunswick
- In office 1967–1970
- Constituency: Campbellton

Personal details
- Born: August 29, 1927 Atholville, New Brunswick
- Died: October 21, 2009 (aged 82) Fredericton, New Brunswick
- Party: Progressive Conservative Party of New Brunswick
- Spouse: Therese Bourque
- Children: 7
- Occupation: lawyer

Lewis Charles Ayles (August 28, 1927 – October 21, 2009) was a Canadian politician. He served in the Legislative Assembly of New Brunswick as member of the Progressive Conservative party.

== Life ==
Lewis Charles Ayles was born on August 28, 1927, in Atholville, New Brunswick, to Clifford and Evelyn (née Landry) Ayles. He graduated from Dalhousie Law School and was admitted to the New Brunswick bar in 1952. In the 1967 general election, he was elected to the Legislative Assembly of New Brunswick as a member of the Progressive Conservative Party in the newly-created riding of Campbellton.

Ayles died on October 21, 2009 at the Dr. Everett Chalmers Regional Hospital in Fredericton, at the age of 82. His funeral was held in Campbellton.

One of Ayles's siblings, Clifford Edward Ayles, robbed and murdered a man in Saint John, New Brunswick in October 1955. After fleeing to Arizona, he was captured and extradited to Canada. Clifford was found guilty of murder, sentenced to death, and hanged on November 6, 1956. He was the last man to be hanged in Saint John.

== Electoral record ==
1967 New Brunswick general election
Party	Candidate	Votes	%
Progressive Conservative	Lewis C. Ayles	3,247	57.17
Liberal	Keith Thompson	2,433	42.83
Total valid votes		5,680	100.0
