= Pierrette Ringuette =

Canadian politician (born 1955)

The Honourable Pierrette Ringuette

Canadian Senator from New Brunswick
- Incumbent
- Assumed office December 12, 2002
- Nominated by: Jean Chrétien
- Appointed by: Adrienne Clarkson

Member of Parliament for Madawaska—Victoria
- In office October 25, 1993 – April 27, 1997
- Preceded by: Bernard Valcourt
- Succeeded by: riding abolished

Member of the New Brunswick Legislative Assembly for Madawaska South
- In office October 13, 1987 – October 25, 1993
- Preceded by: Percy Mockler
- Succeeded by: Percy Mockler

Personal details
- Born: December 31, 1955 (age 70) Edmundston, New Brunswick, Canada
- Party: Independent Senators Group (since 2016)
- Other political affiliations: Liberal (until 2014); Independent Liberal (2014–2016)
- Education: University of Moncton (BA); Université Laval (MA); University of Ottawa (MBA)
- Occupation: Politician; businesswoman

Pierrette Ringuette (born December 31, 1955), also formerly known as Pierrette Ringuette-Maltais, is a Canadian politician. On December 12, 2002, Ringuette was appointed to the Senate of Canada by Governor General Adrienne Clarkson.

== Early life and education ==
Born in Edmundston, New Brunswick, Ringuette was raised in Sainte-Anne-de-Madawaska. Ringuette received a Bachelor of Arts from the Université de Moncton and in 2000, a Master of Business Administration from the University of Ottawa. She has completed the coursework for a Master of Industrial Relations.

== Political career ==
Ringuette was the first francophone woman to be elected to the Legislative Assembly of New Brunswick. She sat in the body as a member of the New Brunswick Liberal Party beginning in 1987, and resigned her seat once she was elected as a Member of Parliament (MP). She was succeeded by her predecessor, Percy Mockler, in a provincial by-election in 1993.

In the 1993 federal election, she won a seat in the House of Commons of Canada as the Liberal MP for Madawaska—Victoria by defeating Progressive Conservative Cabinet Minister Bernard Valcourt.

She was defeated in the subsequent 1997 federal election, one of a number of Maritime Liberal MPs who lost their seats that year.

After her electoral defeat, she joined Canada Post Corporation in a senior position as manager of the international trade development unit.

== As Senator ==
On December 12, 2002, she was appointed to the Senate on the recommendation of Prime Minister Jean Chrétien.

On January 29, 2014, Liberal Party leader Justin Trudeau announced all Liberal Senators, including Ringuette, were removed from the Liberal caucus, and would continue sitting as independents. The Senators referred to themselves as the Senate Liberal Caucus even though they were no longer members of the parliamentary Liberal caucus.

Ringuette announced, on February 2, 2016 that she was leaving the Senate Liberal caucus to sit as an independent saying, in a statement, that "Canadians have been clear in their desire for a non-partisan Senate. The status quo is not acceptable." She joined the Independent Senators Group later that year.

She was deputy chair of the Canadian Senate Standing Committee on Rules, Procedures and the Rights of Parliament in the 45th Canadian Parliament.

== Electoral record ==
=== Federal ===
1997 Canadian federal election: Tobique—Mactaquac
Party	Candidate	Votes	%
Progressive Conservative	Gilles Bernier	12,125	35.9
Liberal	Pierrette Ringuette	10,190	30.2
Reform	Ivan Shaw	9,371	27.7
New Democratic	Leslie Ann Ferguson	2,093	6.2
Total		33,779	100.0

1993 Canadian federal election
Party	Candidate	Votes	%	±%
Liberal	Pierrette Ringuette	16,058	48.8	+5.0
Progressive Conservative	Bernard Valcourt	15,045	45.7	-2.5
Reform	Kimberly Spikings	955	2.9	+2.9
New Democratic Party	Parise Martin	844	2.6	-5.4
Total		32,902		

=== Provincial ===
1991 New Brunswick general election
Party	Candidate	Votes	%	±%
Liberal	Pierrette Ringuette	2,843	59.64	+7.70
Progressive Conservative	Théo Poitras	1,715	35.98	-9.46
New Democratic	Julien Tardif	209	4.38	+1.76
Total valid votes		4,767	100.0	
Liberal hold		Swing		+8.58

1987 New Brunswick general election
Party	Candidate	Votes	%	±%
Liberal	Pierrette Ringuette	2,597	51.94	+7.62
Progressive Conservative	Percy P. Mockler	2,272	45.44	-8.41
New Democratic	Jean-Claude Bosse	131	2.62	+0.79
Total valid votes		5,000	100.0	
Liberal gain from Progressive Conservative		Swing		+8.02
