= Edmundston (electoral district) =

Defunct provincial electoral district in New Brunswick, Canada

New Brunswick electoral district

Defunct provincial electoral district
- Legislature: Legislative Assembly of New Brunswick
- District created: 1967
- District abolished: 2006
- First contested: 1967
- Last contested: 2003

Edmundston was a provincial electoral district for the Legislative Assembly of New Brunswick, Canada. It was superseded by the Edmundston-Saint Basile district in 2006.

== Members of the Legislative Assembly ==
Assembly	Years	Member	Party
Riding created from Madawaska
46th	1967–1970	B. Fernand Nadeau	Liberal
47th	1970–1974	Jean-Maurice Simard	Progressive Conservative
48th	1974–1978	Jean-Maurice Simard	Progressive Conservative
49th	1978–1982	Jean-Maurice Simard	Progressive Conservative
50th	1982–1986	Jean-Maurice Simard	Progressive Conservative
50th	1986–1987	Roland Beaulieu	Liberal
51st	1987–1991	Roland Beaulieu	Liberal
52nd	1991–1995	Roland Beaulieu	Liberal
53rd	1995–1999	Bernard Valcourt	Progressive Conservative
54th	1999–2003	Madeleine Dubé	Progressive Conservative
55th	2003–2006	Madeleine Dubé	Progressive Conservative
Riding dissolved into Edmundston-Saint Basile

== Election results ==
2003 New Brunswick general election
Party	Candidate	Votes	%	±%
Progressive Conservative	Madeleine Dubé	3,917	66.75	+8.33
Liberal	Margot Albert	1,841	31.37	-4.22
New Democratic	Blair McInnis	110	1.87	-4.12
Total valid votes		5,868	100.0	
Progressive Conservative hold		Swing		+6.28

1999 New Brunswick general election
Party	Candidate	Votes	%	±%
Progressive Conservative	Madeleine Dubé	3,567	58.42	-0.78
Liberal	Roland Beaulieu	2,173	35.59	-3.78
New Democratic	Michael Gagné	366	5.99	+4.56
Total valid votes		6,106	100.0	
Progressive Conservative hold		Swing		+1.50

1995 New Brunswick general election
Party	Candidate	Votes	%	±%
Progressive Conservative	Bernard Valcourt	4,215	59.20	+38.41
Liberal	Roland Beaulieu	2,803	39.37	-26.91
New Democratic	Maureen Michaud	102	1.43	-11.50
Total valid votes		7,120	100.0	
Progressive Conservative gain from Liberal		Swing		+32.66

1991 New Brunswick general election
Party	Candidate	Votes	%	±%
Liberal	Roland Beaulieu	3,686	66.28	-5.48
Progressive Conservative	Patrick Dalpé	1,156	20.79	-1.20
New Democratic	Réal Couturier	719	12.93	+6.68
Total valid votes		5,561	100.0	
Liberal hold		Swing		-2.14

1987 New Brunswick general election
Party	Candidate	Votes	%	±%
Liberal	Roland Beaulieu	4,526	71.76	+8.51
Progressive Conservative	J. Pius Bard	1,387	21.99	-10.39
New Democratic	Rodolphe Martin	394	6.25	+1.89
Total valid votes		6,307	100.0	
Liberal hold		Swing		+9.45

New Brunswick provincial by-election, 10 February 1986
Party	Candidate	Votes	%	±%
Liberal	Roland Beaulieu	4,000	63.25	+23.01
Progressive Conservative	Charles E. Fournier	2,048	32.38	-20.71
New Democratic	Rodolphe Martin	276	4.36	-2.31
Total valid votes		6,324	100.0	
Liberal gain from Progressive Conservative		Swing		+21.86

1982 New Brunswick general election
Party	Candidate	Votes	%	±%
Progressive Conservative	Jean-Maurice Simard	3,393	53.09	-1.70
Liberal	Laurier Levesque	2,572	40.24	-1.68
New Democratic	Louise Winchester	426	6.67	–
Total valid votes		6,391	100.0	
Progressive Conservative hold		Swing		-0.01

1978 New Brunswick general election
Party	Candidate	Votes	%	±%
Progressive Conservative	Jean-Maurice Simard	3,228	54.79	-0.35
Liberal	Donald D'Amours	2,470	41.92	-0.36
Parti acadien	Céline Couturier	194	3.29	+0.71
Total valid votes		5,892	100.0	
Progressive Conservative hold		Swing		±0

1974 New Brunswick general election
Party	Candidate	Votes	%	±%
Progressive Conservative	Jean Maurice Simard	3,588	55.14	-0.04
Liberal	Jean Claude Angers	2,751	42.28	-2.54
Parti acadien	Louis A. Simard	168	2.58	–
Total valid votes		6,507	100.0	
Progressive Conservative hold		Swing		+1.25

1970 New Brunswick general election
Party	Candidate	Votes	%	±%
Progressive Conservative	Jean-Maurice Simard	3,065	55.18	+11.20
Liberal	Fernand Picard	2,490	44.82	-11.20
Total valid votes		5,555	100.0	
Progressive Conservative gain from Liberal		Swing		+11.20

1967 New Brunswick general election
Party	Candidate	Votes	%
Liberal	B. Fernand Nadeau	2,952	56.02
Progressive Conservative	Prof. Lucien Fortin	2,318	43.98
Total valid votes		5,270	100.0

== See also ==
- List of New Brunswick provincial electoral districts
- Canadian provincial electoral districts
