= Greg Davis (Canadian politician) =

Canadian politician

MLA for Campbellton-Restigouche Centre
- In office October 12, 2010 – 2014
- Preceded by: Roy Boudreau
- Succeeded by: riding dissolved

Personal details
- Born: 1962 (age 63–64) Campbellton, New Brunswick
- Party: Progressive Conservative

Greg Davis is a Canadian politician, who was elected to the Legislative Assembly of New Brunswick in the 2010 provincial election. He represented the electoral district of Campbellton-Restigouche Centre as a member of the Progressive Conservatives until the 2014 election, when he did not run for reelection to another term. During his term he served as Vice Chair - New Brunswick Legislature Public Accounts, Health, Education, Estimates and Fiscal Policy and Official Languages. He served as President of the Campbellton PC Association for over 20 years. PC Provincial Council for 15. President NB PC youth. VP and President of St Thomas University Student Union and New Brunswick Student Alliance. Served as Deputy Mayor/Chair of Finance & Administration, City of Campbellton. Vice President, New Brunswick Real Estate Association, Member - Canadian Real Estate Association Government Action Committee. President, Campbellton Regional Chamber of Commerce, President, Restigouche Art Gallery, Restigouche Country Volunteer Action Association and Campbelltown Regional SnoFest, President, City of Campbellton /RCMP Community Based Policing. Awards include Business Person of the Year, Golden T Award - St Thomas University and Rotary Paul Harris Fellow Award, among various other awards. After 10 years in the NB Public Service he left to pursue a successful career in private enterprise.
