= Gilles Bernier (New Brunswick politician) =

Canadian politician

Member of the Canadian Parliament for Tobique—Mactaquac
- In office 1997–2000
- Preceded by: Riding created from Carleton—Charlotte, Fredericton—York—Sunbury and Madawaska—Victoria
- Succeeded by: Andy Savoy

Personal details
- Born: August 6, 1955 (age 70) Grand Falls, New Brunswick, Canada
- Party: Progressive Conservative Party
- Occupation: businessman

Gilles Bernier (born August 6, 1955, in Grand Falls, New Brunswick, Canada) is a former Canadian politician. He was elected to the House of Commons of Canada as a Progressive Conservative to represent the riding of Tobique—Mactaquac. He was the Progressive Conservative Critic for Public Works and Government Services in 1998 and was a member of the Canadian House of Commons Standing Committee on Natural Resources and Government Operations.

2000 Canadian federal election: Tobique—Mactaquac
Party	Candidate	Votes	%	±%
Liberal	Andy Savoy	10,900	33.6	+3.4
Progressive Conservative	Gilles Bernier	10,750	33.1	-2.8
Alliance	Adam Richardson	9,570	29.5	+1.8
New Democratic	Carolyn Van Dine	1,216	3.7	-2.5
Total		32,436	100.0	

1997 Canadian federal election: Tobique—Mactaquac
Party	Candidate	Votes	%
Progressive Conservative	Gilles Bernier	12,125	35.9
Liberal	Pierrette Ringuette	10,190	30.2
Reform	Ivan Shaw	9,371	27.7
New Democratic	Leslie Ann Ferguson	2,093	6.2
Total		33,779	100.0
