= Roy Boudreau =

Canadian politician and teacher (1946–2023)

Speaker of the Legislative Assembly of New Brunswick
- In office 2007–2010
- Preceded by: Eugene McGinley
- Succeeded by: Dale Graham

MLA for Campbellton-Restigouche Centre Campbellton (2003-2006)
- In office 2003–2010
- Preceded by: Jean F. Dubé
- Succeeded by: Greg Davis

Personal details
- Born: October 24, 1946 Campbellton, New Brunswick, Canada
- Died: September 29, 2023 (aged 76)
- Party: Liberal
- Spouse: Paulette Lurette
- Occupation: School teacher

Roy Boudreau (October 24, 1946 – September 29, 2023) was a Canadian teacher and politician in New Brunswick. From 2003 to 2010, he was the member of the Legislative Assembly of New Brunswick for the riding of Campbellton-Restigouche Centre.

== Life and career ==
Boudreau was educated at the New Brunswick Teachers’ College and the Université de Moncton, receiving a B. Ed. from the latter institution. He was a teacher for 33 years, the latter years of which he was a vice-principal and principal. He was elected to Campbellton city council in 2001 after an unsuccessful bid in 1998.

A Liberal, he was elected to the legislature in 2003 for the district of Campbellton. He served in the opposition shadow cabinet at various times as critic for Department of Tourism and Parks, the Culture and Sport Secretariat, the anglophone section of the Department of Education and the Department of Family and Community Services.

Boudreau was re-elected to the slightly altered district of Campbellton-Restigouche Centre in the 2006 election in which his Liberal Party formed the government. He was named deputy speaker on October 16, 2006 and elected speaker on November 27, 2007.

In the 2010 election, Boudreau was defeated by Progressive Conservative candidate Greg Davis.

Boudreau died on September 29, 2023, at the age of 76.
