= B. Fernand Nadeau =

Canadian politician

MLA for Edmundston
- In office 1967–1970
- Succeeded by: Jean-Maurice Simard

Personal details
- Born: April 2, 1924 St. Leonard, New Brunswick
- Died: May 30, 2005 (aged 81) Edmundston, New Brunswick
- Party: New Brunswick Liberal Association

B. Fernand Nadeau (April 2, 1924 – May 30, 2005) was a Canadian politician. He served in the Legislative Assembly of New Brunswick from 1967 to 1970, as a Liberal member for the constituency of Edmundston. He was also mayor of Edmundston. He died in hospital at Edmundston in 2005.

== Biography ==
B. Fernand Nadeau was born on April 2, 1924, in Saint-Léonard, New Brunswick. His father is Épiphane Nadeau and his mother is Eugénie Soucy. After his secondary studies at the École supérieure de Saint-Léonard, he entered the Collège Saint-Joseph College in Memramcook and then the Université Laval in Quebec City. He married Ruth Delaney on July 28, 1952, and the couple had two children.

He was the Liberal Member of the Legislative Assembly for Madawska and then for the City of Edmundston from 1967 to 1970. He was Minister of Municipal Affairs in the government of Louis Robichaud. He was also mayor of Edmundston from 1963 to 1968.

He was president of the Edmundston Chamber of Commerce between 1961 and 1962. He is also a member of the Lions Club, the Knights of Columbus and the Club 200 of Collège Saint-Louis-Maillet.
