= René Arseneault =

Canadian politician (born 1966)

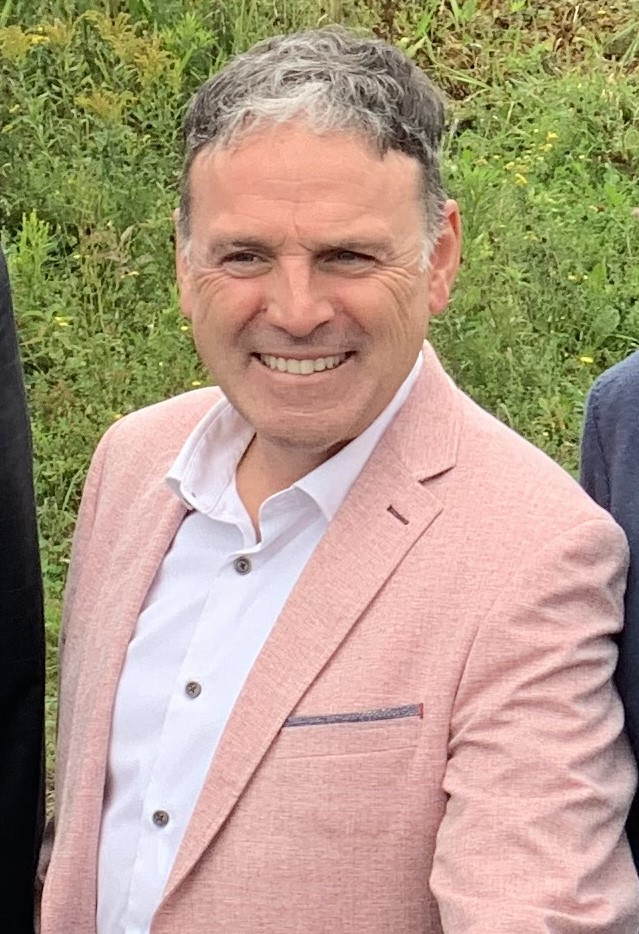
- Arseneault in 2023

Member of Parliament for Madawaska—Restigouche
- In office October 19, 2015 – March 23, 2025
- Preceded by: Bernard Valcourt
- Succeeded by: Guillaume Deschênes-Thériault

Personal details
- Born: July 1, 1966 (age 59)
- Party: Liberal
- Spouse: Michèle Pelletier
- Profession: Lawyer

René Arseneault (French pronunciation: [ʁəne aʁsəno]; born July 1, 1966) is a Canadian lawyer and politician who represented the riding of Madawaska—Restigouche in the House of Commons from 2015 to 2025. A member of the Liberal Party, he did not seek reelection after three terms in office.

== Background ==
Arseneault earned an undergraduate degree in economics and political science, followed by a law degree from the Université de Moncton. He established a law practice with his wife Michèle Pelletier in 1996.

On becoming a lawyer, he succeeded in overturning a requirement to swear an oath to the monarch and became the first lawyer in New Brunswick to join the bar without swearing the oath.

== Political career ==
Arsenault was elected as a Member of Parliament for Madawaska—Restigouche in the 2015 federal election.

Arsenault was named Parliamentary Secretary to the Minister of Economic Development and Official Languages (Atlantic Canada Opportunities Agency and Official Languages) on December 12, 2019.

On August 16, 2024, Arseneault announced that he would not be running in the 2025 election.

=== Foreign policy ===
In February 2016, Arseneault broke ranks from many of his fellow Liberals when he voted against a Conservative Party motion rejecting the Boycott, Divestment and Sanctions (BDS) movement. Arseneault addressed his vote by later stating that "he did not have a clear conscience with the motion as proposed," further adding that it would have been different if the motion were one which condemned organizations that promoted antisemitism. He disagreed with the motion's claim that the movement was "demonizing Israel" and rather described the movement as "encouraging boycotts of certain Israeli products made in the occupied territories." Arseneault added that this condemnation, in his opinion, violated Canadian freedom of expression. The motion was also voted against by two other Liberals as well as the New Democratic Party and the Bloc Québécois.

== Electoral record ==
2021 Canadian federal election: Madawaska—Restigouche
Party	Candidate	Votes	%	±%	Expenditures
Liberal	René Arseneault	16,854	55.22	+4.94	$38,339.96
Conservative	Shawn Beaulieu	7,857	25.74	-2.69	$33,053.20
People's	Nancy Mercier	1,889	6.19	–	$0.00
New Democratic	Elizabeth MacDonald	1,859	6.09	-0.33	$0.00
Free	Louis Berube	1,277	4.18	–	$0.00
Green	Rebecca Blaevoet	786	2.58	-12.29	$0.00
Total valid votes/expense limit		30,522	100.0	–	$104,119.82
Total rejected ballots					
Turnout		30,522	60.74	-8.37	
Registered voters		50,252			
Liberal hold		Swing		+3.82	
Source: Elections Canada

2019 Canadian federal election: Madawaska—Restigouche
Party	Candidate	Votes	%	±%	Expenditures
Liberal	René Arseneault	17,331	50.28	-5.42	$69,640.81
Conservative	Nelson Fox	9,801	28.43	+11.95	$41,501.75
Green	Louis Bérubé	5,125	14.87	+12.97	$11,518.03
New Democratic	Chad Betteridge	2,212	6.42	-19.50	$0.00
Total valid votes/expense limit		34.469	98.13		
Total rejected ballots		657	1.87	+0.95	
Turnout		35,126	69.11	-4.86	
Eligible voters		50,828			
Liberal hold		Swing		-8.68	
Source: Elections Canada

2015 Canadian federal election: Madawaska—Restigouche
Party	Candidate	Votes	%	±%	Expenditures
Liberal	René Arseneault	20,778	55.70	+20.91	$66,315.47
New Democratic	Rosaire L'Italien	9,670	25.92	+6.58	$92,730.82
Conservative	Bernard Valcourt	6,151	16.49	-23.99	$101,364.85
Green	Françoise Aubin	707	1.90	+0.10	–
Total valid votes/expense limit		37,306	99.08		$199,271.58
Total rejected ballots		348	0.92	–	
Turnout		37,654	74.02	–	
Eligible voters		50,871			
Liberal gain from Conservative		Swing		+22.45	
Source: Elections Canada
