= Bernard Valcourt =

Canadian politician (born 1952)

The Honourable Bernard Valcourt PC KC

Minister of Aboriginal Affairs and Northern Development
- In office February 22, 2013 – November 3, 2015
- Prime Minister: Stephen Harper
- Preceded by: James Moore (acting)
- Succeeded by: Carolyn Bennett

Associate Minister of National Defence
- In office July 4, 2012 – February 21, 2013
- Prime Minister: Stephen Harper
- Preceded by: Julian Fantino
- Succeeded by: Kerry-Lynne Findlay

Minister of Labour
- In office June 25, 1993 – November 3, 1993
- Prime Minister: Kim Campbell
- Preceded by: Marcel Danis
- Succeeded by: Lloyd Axworthy

Minister of Employment and Immigration
- In office April 21, 1991 – November 3, 1993
- Prime Minister: Brian Mulroney; Kim Campbell
- Preceded by: Barbara McDougall
- Succeeded by: Lloyd Axworthy

Minister of Fisheries and Oceans
- In office February 23, 1990 – April 20, 1991
- Prime Minister: Brian Mulroney
- Preceded by: Tom Siddon
- Succeeded by: John Crosbie

Minister of Consumer and Corporate Affairs
- In office January 30, 1989 – July 4, 1989
- Prime Minister: Brian Mulroney
- Preceded by: Harvie Andre
- Succeeded by: Harvie Andre (acting)

Member of Parliament for Madawaska—Restigouche
- In office May 2, 2011 – October 18, 2015
- Preceded by: Jean-Claude D'Amours
- Succeeded by: René Arseneault

Leader of the Opposition of New Brunswick
- In office May 14, 1995 – October 17, 1997
- Preceded by: Greg Hargrove
- Succeeded by: Elvy Robichaud

Leader of the Progressive Conservative Party of New Brunswick
- In office May 14, 1995 – October 17, 1997
- Preceded by: Dennis Cochrane
- Succeeded by: Bernard Lord

MLA for Edmundston
- In office September 11, 1995 – June 6, 1999
- Preceded by: Roland Beaulieu
- Succeeded by: Madeleine Dubé

Member of Parliament for Madawaska—Victoria
- In office September 4, 1984 – October 25, 1993
- Preceded by: Eymard Corbin
- Succeeded by: Pierrette Ringuette

Personal details
- Born: February 18, 1952 (age 74) Saint-Quentin, New Brunswick, Canada
- Party: Conservative (2011–)
- Other political affiliations: Progressive Conservative (1984–1993)
- Profession: Lawyer

Bernard Valcourt PC KC (born February 18, 1952) is a Canadian politician and lawyer, who served as Member of Parliament for the electoral district of Madawaska—Restigouche, New Brunswick until he was defeated in the 2015 federal election.

== Early federal political career and Mulroney cabinet ==
Valcourt was first elected to the House of Commons of Canada as a Progressive Conservative candidate in the 1984 election that brought Brian Mulroney to power. He was appointed to the Cabinet of Canada in 1986 as a Minister of State. In January 1989, he was promoted to Minister of Consumer and Corporate Affairs, but was forced to resign from Cabinet in August when he lost an eye in a motorcycle accident while driving under the influence of alcohol.

He returned to Cabinet seven months later as Minister of Fisheries and Oceans. In 1991, he was promoted to Minister of Employment and Immigration, and held the position until the government of Mulroney's successor as Progressive Conservative Party leader and prime minister, Kim Campbell, was defeated in the 1993 election. Valcourt was defeated in that election, along with every Tory MP in Atlantic Canada except Elsie Wayne.

== Provincial leader ==
In May 1995, Valcourt was elected leader of the Progressive Conservative Party of New Brunswick. While he won a seat in the Legislative Assembly of New Brunswick in the 1995 provincial election, his party only won six seats against 48 for Frank McKenna's Liberals. Valcourt resigned as leader in 1997 following a lukewarm endorsement of his leadership at a party convention, and was succeeded by Bernard Lord.

== Return to federal politics ==
On March 28, 2011, Valcourt declared his candidacy in the 2011 federal election, running in the riding of Madawaska—Restigouche, which covers the bulk of the territory he'd represented two decades earlier. He was elected on May 2, 2011, defeating Liberal incumbent Jean-Claude D'Amours. He was subsequently appointed to cabinet as Minister of State for both the Atlantic Canada Opportunities Agency and La Francophonie. His sister Martine Coulombe was elected to the Legislative Assembly of New Brunswick in the 2010 provincial election. On July 4, 2012, he was given the additional portfolio of Associate Minister of Defence. Valcourt was part of the AEG initiative, saying co-operation between both the federal and provincial governments, as well as utilities, is key. "The Atlantic Energy Gateway initiative has brought the critical players in the region's energy sector together to not only work toward an affordable, secure, clean energy future, but to also maximize the business and job growth potential of further developing our region's clean and renewable energy industries," said Valcourt in a release.

On February 22, 2013, Valcourt became Minister of Aboriginal Affairs and Northern Development in a cabinet shuffle. Valcourt stirred controversy when he claimed that the high rates of suicide among aboriginal youths were "the responsibility of their parents".

In the 2015 federal election, Valcourt was defeated by Liberal René Arseneault, finishing third with just over 16% of the vote.

== Electoral record ==
2015 Canadian federal election: Madawaska—Restigouche
Party	Candidate	Votes	%	±%	Expenditures
Liberal	René Arseneault	20,778	55.70	+20.91	$66,315.47
New Democratic	Rosaire L'Italien	9,670	25.92	+6.58	$92,730.82
Conservative	Bernard Valcourt	6,151	16.49	-23.99	$101,364.85
Green	Françoise Aubin	707	1.90	+0.10	–
Total valid votes/expense limit		37,306	99.08		$199,271.58
Total rejected ballots		348	0.92	–	
Turnout		37,654	74.02	–	
Eligible voters		50,871			
Liberal gain from Conservative		Swing		+22.45	
Source: Elections Canada

2011 Canadian federal election: Madawaska—Restigouche
Party	Candidate	Votes	%	±%	Expenditures
Conservative	Bernard Valcourt	14,224	40.64	+7.41	$52,308.15
Liberal	Jean-Claude D'Amours	12,309	35.17	-12.23	$60,570.18
New Democratic	Wilder Jules	6,562	18.75	+3.13	$6,934.01
Independent	Louis Bérubé	1,290	3.69	–	$113.00
Green	Lynn Morrison	612	1.75	-2.00	$0.00
Total valid votes/expense limit		34,997	100.0		$81,731.56
Total rejected, unmarked and declined ballots		577	1.62	+0.04	
Turnout		35,574	69.80	+3.03	
Eligible voters		50,966			
Conservative gain from Liberal		Swing		+9.82	

1995 New Brunswick general election: Edmundston
Party	Candidate	Votes	%	±%
Progressive Conservative	Bernard Valcourt	4,215	59.20	+38.41
Liberal	Roland Beaulieu	2,803	39.37	−26.91
New Democratic	Maureen Michaud	102	1.43	−11.50
Total valid votes		7,120	100.0	
Progressive Conservative gain from Liberal		Swing		+32.66

1993 Canadian federal election: Madawaska—Victoria
Party	Candidate	Votes	%	±%
Liberal	Pierrette Ringuette	16,058	48.8	+5.0
Progressive Conservative	Bernard Valcourt	15,045	45.7	−2.5
Reform	Kimberly Spikings	955	2.9	+2.9
New Democratic	Parise Martin	844	2.6	−5.4
Total		32,902		

1988 Canadian federal election: Madawaska—Victoria
Party	Candidate	Votes	%	±%
Progressive Conservative	Bernard Valcourt	14,747	48.2	−3.7
Liberal	Romeo Rossignol	13,385	43.8	+1.9
New Democratic	Réal Couturier	2,441	8.0	+1.8
Total		30,573		

1984 Canadian federal election: Madawaska—Victoria
Party	Candidate	Votes	%	±%
Progressive Conservative	Bernard Valcourt	16,411	51.9	+29.0
Liberal	Gerald Clavette	13,245	41.9	−23.9
New Democratic	Floranne McLaughlin-St-Amand	1,968	6.2	−5.1
Total		31,624		

Political offices
Preceded by Danny Cameron	Leader of the Opposition in the Legislative Assembly of New Brunswick; 1995–1997	Succeeded by Elvy Robichaud
Party political offices
Preceded by Dennis Cochrane	Leader of the Progressive Conservative Party of New Brunswick; 1995–1997	Succeeded by Bernard Lord
Party political offices
Preceded by James Moore	Minister of Aboriginal Affairs and Northern Development; 2013–2015	Succeeded by Carolyn Bennett
