= Andy Savoy =

Canadian politician and engineer

Andy Savoy (born July 12, 1963) is a Canadian politician and engineer.

== Early life ==
Savoy was raised in Victoria County in the Perth-Andover, New Brunswick area and educated at the University of New Brunswick in Fredericton where he earned a Bachelor of Science in engineering as well as a Master of Business Administration.

== Entrance to politics ==
Elected to the Perth-Andover village council in 1989, he represented the village on the Grand Falls Regional Economic Development Commission before resigning in 1991, when he moved to Fredericton to work for the Research and Productivity Council.

In 2000, Savoy ran for Parliament in the conservative-minded riding Tobique—Mactaquac for the Liberal Party. Savoy defeated the incumbent-Member of Parliament (MP), Progressive Conservative Gilles Bernier by only 150 votes. His share of the vote was only 34%, compared to 33% for Bernier and 29% for Canadian Alliance candidate Adam Richardson—the smallest plurality of any successful candidate in that election.

After his first election, he became the first MP from Atlantic Canada to be elected chair of the Rural Caucus of the Liberal Party. On February 4, 2004, he was elected chair of the National Liberal Caucus, the first Atlantic Canadian to hold the post since Brian Tobin in the 1980s.

Despite his success in his first term in office, pundits suggested that Savoy faced a tough battle for re-election especially with the creation of the new Conservative Party of Canada out of the old Progressive Conservative and Canadian Alliance parties whose combined vote in 2000 was 63%. This was not the case as Savoy was re-elected by a margin of 3,008 votes, beating the Conservative candidate Mike Allen 48% to 39%. However, in the 2006 election his luck did not continue, his party lost the election nationally and he too was defeated by Allen by a margin of 336 votes.

He supported Bob Rae's bid for the Liberal leadership in 2006.

Preceded by Gilles Bernier, Progressive Conservative	Member of Parliament for Tobique—Mactaquac; 2000-2006	Succeeded by Mike Allen, Conservative
