= T. J. Harvey =

Canadian politician (born 1982)

Member of Parliament for Tobique—Mactaquac
- In office October 19, 2015 – October 21, 2019
- Preceded by: Mike Allen
- Succeeded by: Richard Bragdon

Personal details
- Born: August 23, 1982 (age 44) Perth-Andover, New Brunswick, Canada
- Party: Liberal
- Education: Nova Scotia Agricultural College
- Profession: Businessman

Thomas J. Harvey (born August 23, 1982) is a Canadian Liberal politician who represented the riding of Tobique—Mactaquac in the House of Commons of Canada from 2015 to 2019.

On February 19, 2019, Harvey announced that he would not run in the 2019 Canadian federal election, and spoke about his "desire to return to work in the private sector."

== Electoral record ==
2015 Canadian federal election: Tobique—Mactaquac
Party	Candidate	Votes	%	±%	Expenditures
Liberal	T. J. Harvey	17,909	46.61	+30.38	$67,600.14
Conservative	Richard Bragdon	14,225	37.02	-25.12	$57,487.20
New Democratic	Robert Kitchen	4,334	11.28	-7.86	$6,199.56
Green	Terry Wishart	1,959	5.10	+2.62	$3,275.40
Total valid votes/expense limit		38,427	100.00		$204,512.49
Total rejected ballots		248	0.64	–	
Turnout		38,675	71.79	–	
Eligible voters		53,870			
Liberal gain from Conservative		Swing		+27.75	
Source: Elections Canada
