= Madawaska—Restigouche =

Federal electoral district in New Brunswick, Canada

New Brunswick electoral district
- Interactive map of riding boundaries from the 2025 federal election
- Coordinates: 47.655°N 67.413°W

Federal electoral district
- Legislature: House of Commons
MP
Guillaume Deschênes-Thériault
Liberal
- District created: 1996
- First contested: 1997
- Last contested: 2025
- District webpage: profile, map

Demographics
- Population (2021): 60,184
- Electors (2025): 59,056
- Area (km²): 11,701
- Pop. density (per km²): 5.1
- Census division(s): Madawaska, Restigouche
- Census subdivision(s): Edmundston, Campbellton, Grand Falls (part), Heron Bay, Haut-Madawaska, Vallée-des-Rivières, Bois-Joli, Saint-Quentin, Kedgwick, St. Basile

Madawaska—Restigouche is a federal electoral district in New Brunswick, Canada, which has been represented in the House of Commons since 1997. Its population in 2021 was 60,184.

Since 2025 its member of Parliament (MP) has been Guillaume Deschênes-Thériault of the Liberal Party.

== Political geography ==
The district includes all of the County of Madawaska (except Saint-André) and all of the County of Restigouche except the extreme eastern part.

The neighbouring ridings are Acadie—Bathurst, Miramichi—Grand Lake, Tobique—Mactaquac, Côte-du-Sud—Rivière-du-Loup—Kataskomiq—Témiscouata, Rimouski-Neigette—Mitis—Matapédia—Les Basques, and Gaspésie—Les Îles-de-la-Madeleine—Listuguj.

Historical population
Year	Pop.	±%
2001	65,877	—
2006	62,593	−5.0%
2011	61,106	−2.4%
2016	60,378	−1.2%
2021	60,184	−0.3%

In 2008, Liberal support was focused in the eastern and central parts of the riding, particularly in Edmundston, Campbellton, and Dalhousie. Support for the Conservatives was centered in the western part of the riding, in a strip of land bordering both Maine and Quebec. There was also a pocket of Tory support outside Saint-Leonard. The NDP won six polls in the riding, all in the Dalhousie area, a community they won.

The electoral district was created in 1996 from Madawaska—Victoria and from Restigouche—Chaleur ridings. This riding gained a small amount of territory from Miramichi as a result of the 2012 federal electoral redistribution.

Following the 2022 Canadian federal electoral redistribution, the riding gained the parishes of Drummond and the northern half of Grand Falls and the municipalities of Saint-André, Grand Falls and Drummond from Tobique—Mactaquac, while the boundary with Miramichi—Grand Lake was rerouted around Mount Carleton Provincial Park and the Nepisiguit Protected Natural Area. These changes came into effect upon the calling of the 2025 Canadian federal election.

== Riding associations ==
Riding associations are the local branches of the national political parties:

Party	Association name	CEO	HQ city
Conservative Party of Canada	Association du Parti conservateur Madawaska-Restigouche	Marcel Michaud	Grand Falls
Liberal Party of Canada	Madawaska--Restigouche Federal Liberal Association	Gilberte Martin	Edmundston
New Democratic Party	Madawaska--Restigouche Federal NDP Riding Association	Jessica Annette Pointon	Ottawa, Ontario

== Members of Parliament ==
This riding has elected the following members of Parliament:

Parliament	Years	Member	Party
Madawaska—Restigouche; Riding created from Madawaska—Victoria and Restigouche—Chaleur
36th	1997–2000	Jean F. Dubé	Progressive Conservative
37th	2000–2004	Jeannot Castonguay	Liberal
38th	2004–2006	Jean-Claude D'Amours	Liberal
39th	2006–2008	Jean-Claude D'Amours	Liberal
40th	2008–2011	Jean-Claude D'Amours	Liberal
41st	2011–2015	Bernard Valcourt	Conservative
42nd	2015–2019	René Arseneault	Liberal
43rd	2019–2021	René Arseneault	Liberal
44th	2021–2025	René Arseneault	Liberal
45th	2025–present	Guillaume Deschênes-Thériault	Liberal

== Election results ==
2025 Canadian federal election
Party	Candidate	Votes	%	±%	Expenditures
Liberal	Guillaume Deschênes-Thériault	22,720	55.18	+3.19	$50,042.24
Conservative	Michel Morin	16,320	39.63	+11.86	$36,298.58
New Democratic	Daisy Petersen	1,251	3.04	−3.12	$22.50
People's	Nancy Mercier	887	2.15	−5.39	$0.00
Total valid votes/expense limit		41,178	99.04	+0.36	$124,253.18
Total rejected ballots		398	0.96	–0.36	
Turnout		41,576	70.29		
Eligible voters		59,149			
Liberal notional hold		Swing		−4.34	
Source: Elections Canada
Note: number of eligible voters does not include voting day registrations.

2021 federal election redistributed results
Party	Vote	%
Liberal	18,784	51.99
Conservative	10,032	27.77
People's	2,724	7.54
New Democratic	2,227	6.16
Green	981	2.72
Others	1,382	3.83

2021 Canadian federal election
Party	Candidate	Votes	%	±%	Expenditures
Liberal	René Arseneault	16,854	55.22	+4.94	$38,339.96
Conservative	Shawn Beaulieu	7,857	25.74	-2.69	$33,053.20
People's	Nancy Mercier	1,889	6.19	–	$0.00
New Democratic	Elizabeth MacDonald	1,859	6.09	-0.33	$0.00
Free	Louis Berube	1,277	4.18	–	$0.00
Green	Rebecca Blaevoet	786	2.58	-12.29	$0.00
Total valid votes/expense limit		30,522	100.0	–	$104,119.82
Total rejected ballots					
Turnout		30,522	60.74	-8.37	
Registered voters		50,252			
Liberal hold		Swing		+3.82	
Source: Elections Canada

2019 Canadian federal election
Party	Candidate	Votes	%	±%	Expenditures
Liberal	René Arseneault	17,331	50.28	-5.42	$69,640.81
Conservative	Nelson Fox	9,801	28.43	+11.95	$41,501.75
Green	Louis Bérubé	5,125	14.87	+12.97	$11,518.03
New Democratic	Chad Betteridge	2,212	6.42	-19.50	$0.00
Total valid votes/expense limit		34.469	98.13		
Total rejected ballots		657	1.87	+0.95	
Turnout		35,126	69.11	-4.86	
Eligible voters		50,828			
Liberal hold		Swing		-8.68	
Source: Elections Canada

This riding gained some territory from Miramichi for the 42nd Canadian federal election.

2015 Canadian federal election
Party	Candidate	Votes	%	±%	Expenditures
Liberal	René Arseneault	20,778	55.70	+20.91	$66,315.47
New Democratic	Rosaire L'Italien	9,670	25.92	+6.58	$92,730.82
Conservative	Bernard Valcourt	6,151	16.49	-23.99	$101,364.85
Green	Françoise Aubin	707	1.90	+0.10	–
Total valid votes/expense limit		37,306	99.08		$199,271.58
Total rejected ballots		348	0.92	–	
Turnout		37,654	74.02	–	
Eligible voters		50,871			
Liberal gain from Conservative		Swing		+22.45	
Source: Elections Canada

2011 federal election redistributed results
Party	Vote	%
Conservative	14,541	40.48
Liberal	12,497	34.79
New Democratic	6,948	19.34
Others	1,290	3.59
Green	646	1.80

2011 Canadian federal election
Party	Candidate	Votes	%	±%	Expenditures
Conservative	Bernard Valcourt	14,224	40.64	+7.41	$52,308.15
Liberal	Jean-Claude D'Amours	12,309	35.17	-12.23	$60,570.18
New Democratic	Wilder Jules	6,562	18.75	+3.13	$6,934.01
Independent	Louis Bérubé	1,290	3.69	–	$113.00
Green	Lynn Morrison	612	1.75	-2.00	$0.00
Total valid votes/expense limit		34,997	100.0		$81,731.56
Total rejected, unmarked and declined ballots		577	1.62	+0.04	
Turnout		35,574	69.80	+3.03	
Eligible voters		50,966			
Conservative gain from Liberal		Swing		+9.82	

2008 Canadian federal election
Party	Candidate	Votes	%	±%	Expenditures
Liberal	Jean-Claude D'Amours	16,266	47.40	+9.06	$77,108.64
Conservative	Jean-Pierre Ouellet	11,402	33.23	-2.18	$75,285.92
New Democratic	Thérèse Tremblay-Philippe	5,361	15.62	-7.29	$16,027.58
Green	André Arpin	1,287	3.75	+0.40	none listed
Total valid votes/expense limit		34,316	100.0		$79,516
Total rejected, unmarked and declined ballots		551	1.58	-0.74	
Turnout		34,867	66.77	-2.70	
Eligible voters		52,222			
Liberal hold		Swing		+5.62	

2006 Canadian federal election
Party	Candidate	Votes	%	±%	Expenditures
Liberal	Jean-Claude D'Amours	13,734	38.02	-6.64	$65,465.20
Conservative	Jean-Pierre Ouellet	12,849	35.57	+11.56	$65,196.27
New Democratic	Rodolphe Martin	8,322	23.04	-4.55	$45,462.27
Green	Irka Laplante	1,220	3.38	-0.36	$99.17
Total valid votes/expense limit		36,125	100.0		$74,283
Total rejected, unmarked and declined ballots		857	2.32		
Turnout		36,982	69.47		
Eligible voters		53,233			
Liberal hold		Swing		-9.10	

2004 Canadian federal election
Party	Candidate	Votes	%	±%	Expenditures
Liberal	Jean-Claude D'Amours	14,144	44.66	-7.75	$62,057.16
New Democratic	Rodolphe Martin	8,737	27.59	+23.18	$16,654.06
Conservative	Benoît Violette	7,605	24.01	-19.61	$39,459.04
Green	Jovette Cyr	1,185	3.74	–	none listed
Total valid votes/expense limit		31,671	100.0		$72,739
Total rejected, unmarked and declined ballots		1,268	3.85		
Turnout		32,939	60.58	-5.24	
Eligible voters		54,369			
Liberal notional hold		Swing		-15.46	
Changes from 2000 are based on redistributed results. Conservative Party change is based on the combination of Canadian Alliance and Progressive Conservative Party totals.

2000 federal election redistributed results
Party	Vote	%
Liberal	18,311	52.41
Progressive Conservative	13,519	38.70
Alliance	1,639	4.92
New Democratic	1,467	4.41

2000 Canadian federal election
Party	Candidate	Votes	%	±%
Liberal	Jeannot Castonguay	19,913	52.27	+15.29
Progressive Conservative	Jean F. Dubé	14,417	37.84	-12.46
Alliance	Scott Chedore	1,958	5.14	
New Democratic	Claude Albert	1,811	4.75	-5.66
Total valid votes		38,099	100.00	

1997 Canadian federal election
Party	Candidate	Votes	%
Progressive Conservative	Jean F. Dubé	20,343	50.30
Liberal	Guy Arseneault	14,957	36.98
New Democratic	André Carrier	4,211	10.41
Natural Law	Laurent Maltais	933	2.31
Total valid votes		40,444	100.00

== See also ==
- List of Canadian electoral districts
- Historical federal electoral districts of Canada
