= Robert Beaulieu =

French cyclist

Personal information
- Born: 3 November 1896 Bourg-La-Reine, France
- Died: 2 May 1977

Cycling career
- Sport: Cycling
- Role: Rider

Robert Beaulieu (3 November 1896 – 2 May 1977) was a French racing cyclist. He rode in the 1922 Tour de France and the 1925 Tour de France.
