= Jean F. Dubé =

Canadian politician (born 1962)

Member of Parliament for Madawaska—Restigouche
- In office June 2, 1997 – November 27, 2000
- Preceded by: Riding created
- Succeeded by: Jeannot Castonguay

Member of the Legislative Assembly of New Brunswick for Campbellton
- In office February 5, 2001 – June 9, 2003
- Preceded by: Edmond Blanchard
- Succeeded by: Roy Boudreau

Personal details
- Born: 29 June 1962 (age 63) Campbellton, New Brunswick
- Party: Progressive Conservative
- Profession: Businessman

Jean F. Dubé (born 29 June 1962, in Campbellton, New Brunswick) was a Progressive Conservative member of the House of Commons of Canada from 1997 to 2000.

A career businessman, he is the son of Fernand Dubé who served for thirteen years in the Cabinet of New Brunswick Premier Richard Hatfield. He served as President of the Campbellton Regional Chamber of Commerce, President of the Campbellton Business Improvement Corporation, and was the founding President of the Bay of Chaleur Alzheimer Society.

Dubé was elected in the Madawaska—Restigouche electoral district in the 1997 general election. He served in the 36th Canadian Parliament until he was defeated by Liberal candidate Jeannot Castonguay in the 2000 election.

He won a 2001 New Brunswick provincial by-election in the Campbellton provincial riding, but lost to Liberal Roy Boudreau in the 2003 general provincial election.

In 2019, he became Executive Director of Maison House of Nazareth, a 105-bed emergency homeless shelter in Moncton, New Brunswick. Dubé stepped down from his association with the shelter after staffing shortages associated with the COVID-19 pandemic in New Brunswick and other promised services for users of the facility could not be met.

== Electoral history ==
2003 New Brunswick general election: Campbellton
Party	Candidate	Votes	%	±%
Liberal	Roy Boudreau	3,979	56.50	+18.25
Progressive Conservative	Jean F. Dubé	2,771	39.34	-19.19
New Democratic	Murray Mason	293	4.16	+0.94
Total valid votes		7,043	100.0	
Liberal gain from Progressive Conservative		Swing		+18.72

New Brunswick provincial by-election, February 5, 2001: Campbellton appointment of Edmond Blanchard to Federal Court of Canada
Party	Candidate	Votes	%	±%
Progressive Conservative	Jean F. Dubé	3,541	58.53	+22.77
Liberal	Arnold Firlotte	2,314	38.25	-21.89
New Democratic	Claude J. Albert	195	3.22	-0.89
Total valid votes		6,050	100.0	
Progressive Conservative gain from Liberal		Swing		+22.33

2000 Canadian federal election: Madawaska—Restigouche
Party	Candidate	Votes	%	±%
Liberal	Jeannot Castonguay	19,913	52.27	+15.29
Progressive Conservative	Jean F. Dubé	14,417	37.84	-12.46
Alliance	Scott Chedore	1,958	5.14	
New Democratic	Claude Albert	1,811	4.75	-5.66
Total valid votes		38,099	100.00	

1997 Canadian federal election: Madawaska—Restigouche
Party	Candidate	Votes	%
Progressive Conservative	Jean F. Dubé	20,343	50.30
Liberal	Guy Arseneault	14,957	36.98
New Democratic	André Carrier	4,211	10.41
Natural Law	Laurent Maltais	933	2.31
Total valid votes		40,444	100.00
