= Richard Bragdon =

Canadian politician (born 1975 or 1976)

Richard Bragdon MP
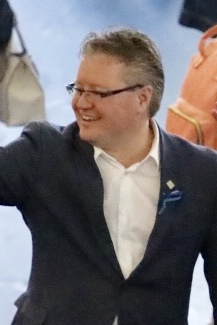
- Bragdon in 2021

Member of Parliament for Tobique—Mactaquac
- Incumbent
- Assumed office October 21, 2019
- Preceded by: T. J. Harvey

Deputy Shadow Minister for Ethics and Accountable Government
- Incumbent
- Assumed office November 11, 2021
- Leader: Erin O'Toole; Candice Bergen
- Preceded by: Position Established

Personal details
- Born: 1975 or 1976 (age 49–50) Woodstock, New Brunswick, Canada
- Party: Conservative Party of Canada

Richard Bragdon MP (born 1975 or 1976) is a Canadian politician who was elected to represent the riding of Tobique—Mactaquac in the House of Commons of Canada for the Conservative Party in the 2019 Canadian federal election. During the 43rd Canadian Parliament Bragdon's private member bill An Act to establish a framework to reduce recidivism (Bill C-228) was adopted to require the Minister of Public Safety and Emergency Preparedness, within one year, to develop a federal framework to reduce recidivism.

In June 2021, Richard Bragdon voted "nay" to Bill C-6 which would make conversion therapy illegal in Canada.

== Electoral record ==
2025 Canadian federal election: Tobique—Mactaquac
Party	Candidate	Votes	%	±%
Conservative	Richard Bragdon	23,322	58.79	+5.97
Liberal	Julian Moulton	14,226	35.86	+13.21
New Democratic	Michael John Winter	812	2.05	−9.49
Green	Liam MacDougall	806	2.03	−2.87
People's	Vern Brundle	501	1.26	−5.97
Total valid votes		39,667	99.49	
Total rejected ballots		203	0.51	-0.17
Turnout		39,870	74.30	+11.53
Eligible voters		53,660		
Conservative notional hold		Swing		−3.62
Source: Elections Canada
Note: number of eligible voters does not include voting day registrations.

2021 Canadian federal election: Tobique—Mactaquac
Party	Candidate	Votes	%	±%	Expenditures
Conservative	Richard Bragdon	17,536	50.98	+0.7	$45,965.28
Liberal	Cully Robinson	8,223	23.90	-1.3	$10,342.40
New Democratic	Meriet Gray Miller	3,656	10.63	+2.7	$0.00
People's	Daniel Joseph Waggoner	2,930	8.52	+6.0	$2,750.09
Green	Anthony Martin	1,657	4.82	-9.3	$5,670.46
Independent	Steven J. LaForest	398	1.15	N/A	$0.00
Total valid votes/expense limit		34,400	99.2	–	$107,922.33
Total rejected ballots		291	0.8		
Turnout		34,691	62.0		
Registered voters		55,973			
Conservative hold		Swing		+1.0	
Source: Elections Canada

2019 Canadian federal election: Tobique—Mactaquac
Party	Candidate	Votes	%	±%	Expenditures
Conservative	Richard Bragdon	19,229	50.34	+13.32	$31,254.86
Liberal	Kelsey MacDonald	9,631	25.21	-21.40	$12,723.90
Green	Rowan P. Miller	5,398	14.13	+9.03	$11,462.77
New Democratic	Megan Aiken	3,007	7.87	-3.41	$0.00
People's	Dominic Guay	936	2.45	-	$402.50
Total valid votes/expense limit		38,201	100.00		
Total rejected ballots		376	0.97	+0.33	
Turnout		38,577	70.01	-0.78	
Eligible voters		55,104			
Conservative gain from Liberal		Swing		+17.36	
Source: Elections Canada

2015 Canadian federal election: Tobique—Mactaquac
Party	Candidate	Votes	%	±%	Expenditures
Liberal	T. J. Harvey	17,909	46.61	+30.38	$67,600.14
Conservative	Richard Bragdon	14,225	37.02	-25.12	$57,487.20
New Democratic	Robert Kitchen	4,334	11.28	-7.86	$6,199.56
Green	Terry Wishart	1,959	5.10	+2.62	$3,275.40
Total valid votes/expense limit		38,427	100.00		$204,512.49
Total rejected ballots		248	0.64	–	
Turnout		38,675	71.79	–	
Eligible voters		53,870			
Liberal gain from Conservative		Swing		+27.75	
Source: Elections Canada
