= Jeannot Castonguay =

Canadian politician

Jeannot Castonguay (born 1 September 1944) was a Liberal member of the House of Commons of Canada from 2000 to 2004. He won the Madawaska—Restigouche electoral district in New Brunswick to become a member of the 37th Canadian Parliament. Born in Saint-Quentin, New Brunswick, Castonguay, is a career physician.

Castonguay left political life in 2004 as he did not seek re-election. Jean-Claude D'Amours won the Madawaska-Restigouche riding for the Liberal party that year.

2000 Canadian federal election: Madawaska—Restigouche
Party	Candidate	Votes	%	±%
Liberal	Jeannot Castonguay	19,913	52.27	+15.29
Progressive Conservative	Jean F. Dubé	14,417	37.84	-12.46
Alliance	Scott Chedore	1,958	5.14	
New Democratic	Claude Albert	1,811	4.75	-5.66
Total valid votes		38,099	100.00	
