= Eymard Corbin =

Canadian retired Senator

Eymard Georges Corbin (born August 2, 1934, in Grand Falls, New Brunswick) is a Canadian retired Senator.

Corbin, a teacher and journalist by profession, was first elected to the House of Commons of Canada in the 1968 election as the Liberal Member of Parliament for Madawaska—Victoria in New Brunswick.

He served as a parliamentary secretary in the early 1970s, Minister of Fisheries and Forestry from October 1, 1970, to June 10, 1971, and Deputy Speaker of the House of Commons of Canada in 1984.

In July 1984, he was one of three appointees to the Senate of Canada made by Prime Minister John Turner as part of a controversial agreement with his predecessor, Pierre Trudeau. Turner had agreed to make several patronage appointments on Trudeau's behalf in order to prevent Trudeau from creating enough vacancies in the House of Commons to leave Turner with a minority government.

Turner was famously blasted for the arrangement by Progressive Conservative leader Brian Mulroney during a nationally televised leaders' debate during the 1984 election. The exchange between Mulroney and Turner in which Turner claimed he "had no option" was a turning point in the campaign, and contributed to the defeat of Turner's government in the election.

Corbin was the last remaining Turner appointee in the Senate when he retired on August 2, 2009.

Parliament of Canada
Preceded by The electoral district was created in 1966.	Member of Parliament for Madawaska—Victoria; 1968-1984	Succeeded by Bernard Valcourt
