= Madawaska—Victoria =

Former federal electoral district in New Brunswick, Canada

New Brunswick electoral district

Defunct federal electoral district
- Legislature: House of Commons
- District created: 1966
- District abolished: 1996
- First contested: 1968
- Last contested: 1993

Demographics
- Census division(s): Madawaska, Victoria

Madawaska—Victoria was a federal electoral district in New Brunswick, Canada, that was represented in the House of Commons of Canada from 1968 to 1997.

The riding consisted of Madawaska and Victoria Counties, which until 1966 had been part of Restigouche—Madawaska and Victoria—Carleton respectively. The district's boundaries did not change during its 30 years. With the 1996 redistribution, most of Madawaska County was placed in the revived Madawaska—Restigouche, while Victoria County became part of Tobique—Mactaquac riding.

Bernard Valcourt, the only non-Liberal ever elected from this riding, served several positions in Brian Mulroney's cabinet between 1988 and 1993.

== Members of Parliament ==
This riding elected the following members of Parliament:

Parliament	Years	Member	Party
Madawaska—Victoria; Riding created from Restigouche—Madawaska and Victoria—Carleton
28th	1968–1972	Eymard Corbin	Liberal
29th	1972–1974	Eymard Corbin	Liberal
30th	1974–1979	Eymard Corbin	Liberal
31st	1979–1980	Eymard Corbin	Liberal
32nd	1980–1984	Eymard Corbin	Liberal
33rd	1984–1988	Bernard Valcourt	Progressive Conservative
34th	1988–1993	Bernard Valcourt	Progressive Conservative
35th	1993–1997	Pierrette Ringuette	Liberal
Riding dissolved into Madawaska—Restigouche and Tobique—Mactaquac

== Election results ==
1993 Canadian federal election
Party	Candidate	Votes	%	±%
Liberal	Pierrette Ringuette	16,058	48.8	+5.0
Progressive Conservative	Bernard Valcourt	15,045	45.7	-2.5
Reform	Kimberly Spikings	955	2.9	+2.9
New Democratic Party	Parise Martin	844	2.6	-5.4
Total		32,902		

1988 Canadian federal election
Party	Candidate	Votes	%	±%
Progressive Conservative	Bernard Valcourt	14,747	48.2	-3.7
Liberal	Romeo Rossignol	13,385	43.8	+1.9
New Democratic Party	Réal Couturier	2,441	8.0	+1.8
Total		30,573		

1984 Canadian federal election
Party	Candidate	Votes	%	±%
Progressive Conservative	Bernard Valcourt	16,411	51.9	+29.0
Liberal	Gerald Clavette	13,245	41.9	-23.9
New Democratic Party	Floranne McLaughlin-St-Amand	1,968	6.2	-5.1
Total		31,624		

1980 Canadian federal election
Party	Candidate	Votes	%	±%
Liberal	Eymard Corbin	17,190	65.8	+4.0
Progressive Conservative	Gerald Akerley	5,979	22.9	-9.0
New Democratic Party	James Aucoin	2,943	11.3	+5.0
Total		26,112		

1979 Canadian federal election
Party	Candidate	Votes	%	±%
Liberal	Eymard Corbin	15,851	61.8	-2.5
Progressive Conservative	Roger Guimond	8,171	31.9	+0.3
New Democratic Party	James Aucoin	1,620	6.3	+2.2
Total		25,642		

1974 Canadian federal election
Party	Candidate	Votes	%	±%
Liberal	Eymard Corbin	14,310	64.3	+9.0
Progressive Conservative	Warren Winchester	7,023	31.6	-5.6
New Democratic Party	Peter Hanson	906	4.1	-3.3
Total		22,239		

1972 Canadian federal election
Party	Candidate	Votes	%	±%
Liberal	Eymard Corbin	13,104	55.3	+5.3
Progressive Conservative	Lawrence Fyfe	8,822	37.2	-10.9
New Democratic Party	Conrad Audet	1,763	7.4	+5.5
Total		23,689		

1968 Canadian federal election
Party	Candidate	Votes	%	±%
Liberal	Eymard Corbin	9,924	50.0	*
Progressive Conservative	Jean-Maurice Simard	9,541	48.1	*
New Democratic Party	George Young	379	1.9	*
Total		19,844		

== See also ==
- List of Canadian electoral districts
- Historical federal electoral districts of Canada
