= Jean-Claude D'Amours =

Canadian politician

Jean-Claude D'Amours MLA

Member of the New Brunswick Legislative Assembly for Edmundston-Madawaska Centre
- Incumbent
- Assumed office September 24, 2018
- Preceded by: Madeleine Dubé

Member of Parliament for Madawaska—Restigouche
- In office June 28, 2004 – May 2, 2011
- Preceded by: Jeannot Castonguay
- Succeeded by: Bernard Valcourt

Personal details
- Born: December 19, 1972 (age 53) Edmundston, New Brunswick, Canada
- Party: Liberal
- Spouse: Hélène Thériault
- Profession: account executive/financial consultant

Jean-Claude "J.C." D'Amours (born December 19, 1972) is a Canadian politician and who represents Edmundston-Madawaska Centre in the New Brunswick legislature. He is a former Member of Parliament for Madawaska—Restigouche.

Born in Edmundston, New Brunswick, D'Amours served as a city councillor in Edmundston from 1998 to 2004. D'Amours is a former account executive, development manager and a financial agent/adviser/consultant.

In the 2004 federal election, D'Amours was elected to the House of Commons of Canada as a member of the Liberal Party of Canada. During his first mandate, he was a member of the Standing Committee on Human Resources, Skills Development, Social Development and the Status of Persons with Disabilities, the Standing Committee on Official Languages and the Subcommittee on the Employment Insurance Funds of the Standing Committee on Human Resources, Skills Development, Social Development and the Status of Persons with Disabilities.

He was re-elected in the 2006 federal election after a close race with Conservative candidate Jean-Pierre Ouellet. His campaign focused on improving the Employment Insurance Program, transferring federal government jobs to rural regions, creating a community development fund and creating a national forum on the forest industry.

D'Amours was defeated by Conservative Bernard Valcourt in the 2011 federal election.

D'Amours was elected in the 2018 provincial election and re-elected in the 2020 provincial election. As of September 8, 2024, he serves as the Official Opposition critic for Health.

D'Amours was re-elected in the 2024 general election. On November 1, 2024, it was announced that he was placed on the cabinet as Minister of Intergovernmental Affairs, Minister responsible for Immigration and Minister responsible for Military Affairs.

== Electoral history ==
=== Provincial ===
2024 New Brunswick general election: Edmundston-Vallée-des-Rivières
Party	Candidate	Votes	%	±%
Liberal	Jean-Claude D'Amours	5,573	81.9%	+7.43
Progressive Conservative	Roger Quimper	1,049	15.4%	-4.23
Social Justice	Sylvain Gerald Voisine	186	2.7%	
Total valid votes		6,808		
Total rejected ballots				
Turnout				
Eligible voters				
Source: Elections New Brunswick

2020 New Brunswick general election: Edmundston-Madawaska Centre
Party	Candidate	Votes	%	±%
Liberal	Jean-Claude D'Amours	5,236	74.47	+7.91
Progressive Conservative	Joanne Bérubé Gagné	1,380	19.63	-0.86
Green	Marco Morency	415	5.90	-4.11
Total valid votes		7,031	100.0	
Total rejected ballots		61	0.86	
Turnout		7,092	63.10	
Eligible voters		11,240		
Liberal hold		Swing		+4.39

2018 New Brunswick general election: Edmundston-Madawaska Centre
Party	Candidate	Votes	%	±%
Liberal	Jean-Claude D'Amours	4,668	66.56	+21.59
Progressive Conservative	Gérald Levesque	1,437	20.49	-27.67
Green	Sophie Vaillancourt	702	10.01	--
New Democratic	Anne-Marie Comeau	206	2.94	-3.93
Total valid votes		7,013	100.0	
Total rejected ballots		80		
Turnout		7,093	62.64	
Eligible voters		11,323		

=== Federal ===
2011 Canadian federal election: Madawaska—Restigouche
Party	Candidate	Votes	%	±%	Expenditures
Conservative	Bernard Valcourt	14,224	40.64	+7.41	$52,308.15
Liberal	Jean-Claude D'Amours	12,309	35.17	-12.23	$60,570.18
New Democratic	Wilder Jules	6,562	18.75	+3.13	$6,934.01
Independent	Louis Bérubé	1,290	3.69	–	$113.00
Green	Lynn Morrison	612	1.75	-2.00	$0.00
Total valid votes/expense limit		34,997	100.0		$81,731.56
Total rejected, unmarked and declined ballots		577	1.62	+0.04	
Turnout		35,574	69.80	+3.03	
Eligible voters		50,966			
Conservative gain from Liberal		Swing		+9.82	

2008 Canadian federal election: Madawaska—Restigouche
Party	Candidate	Votes	%	±%	Expenditures
Liberal	Jean-Claude D'Amours	16,266	47.40	+9.06	$77,108.64
Conservative	Jean-Pierre Ouellet	11,402	33.23	-2.18	$75,285.92
New Democratic	Thérèse Tremblay-Philippe	5,361	15.62	-7.29	$16,027.58
Green	André Arpin	1,287	3.75	+0.40	none listed
Total valid votes/expense limit		34,316	100.0		$79,516
Total rejected, unmarked and declined ballots		551	1.58	-0.74	
Turnout		34,867	66.77	-2.70	
Eligible voters		52,222			
Liberal hold		Swing		+5.62	

2006 Canadian federal election: Madawaska—Restigouche
Party	Candidate	Votes	%	±%	Expenditures
Liberal	Jean-Claude D'Amours	13,734	38.02	-6.64	$65,465.20
Conservative	Jean-Pierre Ouellet	12,849	35.57	+11.56	$65,196.27
New Democratic	Rodolphe Martin	8,322	23.04	-4.55	$45,462.27
Green	Irka Laplante	1,220	3.38	-0.36	$99.17
Total valid votes/expense limit		36,125	100.0		$74,283
Total rejected, unmarked and declined ballots		857	2.32		
Turnout		36,982	69.47		
Eligible voters		53,233			
Liberal hold		Swing		-9.10	

2004 Canadian federal election: Madawaska—Restigouche
Party	Candidate	Votes	%	±%	Expenditures
Liberal	Jean-Claude D'Amours	14,144	44.66	-7.75	$62,057.16
New Democratic	Rodolphe Martin	8,737	27.59	+23.18	$16,654.06
Conservative	Benoît Violette	7,605	24.01	-19.61	$39,459.04
Green	Jovette Cyr	1,185	3.74	–	none listed
Total valid votes/expense limit		31,671	100.0		$72,739
Total rejected, unmarked and declined ballots		1,268	3.85		
Turnout		32,939	60.58	-5.24	
Eligible voters		54,369			
Liberal notional hold		Swing		-15.46	
Changes from 2000 are based on redistributed results. Conservative Party change is based on the combination of Canadian Alliance and Progressive Conservative Party totals.
