= Tobique—Mactaquac =

Federal electoral district in New Brunswick, Canada

New Brunswick electoral district
- Interactive map of riding boundaries from the 2025 federal election
- Coordinates: 46.531°N 67.237°W

Federal electoral district
- Legislature: House of Commons
MP
Richard Bragdon
Conservative
- District created: 1996
- First contested: 1997
- Last contested: 2025
- District webpage: profile, map

Demographics
- Population (2016): 68,673
- Electors (2025): 53,436
- Area (km²): 15,130
- Pop. density (per km²): 4.5
- Census division(s): Carleton, Victoria, York
- Census subdivision(s): Woodstock, Grand Falls (part), Carleton North, Hanwell, Central York, Nashwaak, Harvey (part), Nackawic-Millville, Hartland, Tobique Valley

Tobique—Mactaquac is a federal electoral district in New Brunswick, Canada, that has been represented in the House of Commons of Canada since 1997.

== Political geography ==
The district includes the counties of Carleton and Victoria as well as the Parish and Village of Saint-André and the eastern part of the County of York (excluding the City of Fredericton and vicinity). The neighbouring ridings are Madawaska—Restigouche, Miramichi—Grand Lake, Fredericton—Oromocto, and New Brunswick Southwest. Across the border to Maine, it neighbours the Maine District 2 of the United States House of Representatives.

The electoral district was created in 1996 from portions of the old ridings of Carleton—Charlotte, Fredericton—York—Sunbury, and Madawaska—Victoria. Its creation was very controversial, as it included areas with both large anglophone and francophone populations, while neighbouring communities were placed in other ridings. This seemingly went against the "communities of interest" criterion in drawing electoral boundaries.

Following the 2012 federal electoral distribution, this riding gained territory from Fredericton and lost a small territory to the new riding of Miramichi—Grand Lake.

Following the 2022 Canadian federal electoral redistribution, the riding gained the Parishes of Dumfries, Prince William, Manners Sutton, and Kingsclear, and the municipalities of Hanwell, and Harvey and the Indian Reserve of Kingsclear 6 from New Brunswick Southwest, while its border with Fredericton—Oromocto (replacing Fredericton) was rerouted to follow the northern border of the City of Fredericton (2023 borders), and it lost the parishes of Drummond and Grand Falls and the municipalities of Saint-André, Grand Falls and Drummond to Madawaska—Restigouche.

== Demographics ==
Historical population
Year	Pop.	±%
2001	70,105	—
2006	68,352	−2.5%
2011	68,709	+0.5%
2016	68,673	−0.1%
2021	69,344	+1.0%

According to the 2021 Canadian census; 2023 representation

Racial groups: 91.8% White, 5.8% Indigenous
Languages: 92.8% English, 4.8% French
Religions: 60.1% Christian (15.5% Catholic, 13.4% Baptist, 6.4% United Church, 6.0% Anglican, 4.6% Pentecostal, 1.9% Methodist, 1.4% Presbyterian, 11.0% Other), 38.1% No religion
Median income (2020): $36,800
Average income (2020): $45,280

== History ==
On two separate occasions Tobique—Mactaquac has been involved in party nomination controversies. In the 1997 election, the Liberals were alleged to have rigged their meeting to choose Pierrette Ringuette, the Member of Parliament for the defunct Madawaska—Victoria riding. The meeting was held in Grand Falls, near her hometown and at the far northern end of the riding. Because of sound problems, only her speech was carried over the loudspeakers. Ringuette-Maltais lost the election to Gilles Bernier of the Progressive Conservatives.

In the 2004 election, the Conservative Party selected Adam Richardson, who had run for the Canadian Alliance in the 2000 election, but the national head office refused to sign his nomination papers, apparently because of Richardson's demands that party leader Stephen Harper apologize for allegedly derogatory comments about Atlantic Canadians. The eventual Conservative candidate, Mike Allen, lost to Liberal incumbent Andy Savoy.

=== Members of Parliament ===
This riding has elected the following members of Parliament:

Parliament	Years	Member	Party
Tobique—Mactaquac; Riding created from Carleton—Charlotte, Fredericton—York—Sunbury and Madawaska—Victoria
36th	1997–2000	Gilles Bernier	Progressive Conservative
37th	2000–2004	Andy Savoy	Liberal
38th	2004–2006	Andy Savoy	Liberal
39th	2006–2008	Mike Allen	Conservative
40th	2008–2011	Mike Allen	Conservative
41st	2011–2015	Mike Allen	Conservative
42nd	2015–2019	T. J. Harvey	Liberal
43rd	2019–2021	Richard Bragdon	Conservative
44th	2021–2025	Richard Bragdon	Conservative
45th	2025–present	Richard Bragdon	Conservative

== Election results ==
Graph of election results in Tobique—Mactaquac (1996-, minor parties that never got 2% of the vote or didn't run consistently are omitted) View source data.

=== Tobique—Mactaquac, 2023 representation order ===
2025 Canadian federal election
Party	Candidate	Votes	%	±%	Expenditures
Conservative	Richard Bragdon	23,322	58.79	+5.97	$52,053.12
Liberal	Julian Moulton	14,226	35.86	+13.21	$32,830.74
New Democratic	Michael John Winter	812	2.05	−9.49	$22.50
Green	Liam MacDougall	806	2.03	−2.87	$0.00
People's	Vern Brundle	501	1.26	−5.97	$0.00
Total valid votes		39,667	99.49	+0.17	$122,413.38
Total rejected ballots		203	0.51	–0.17	
Turnout		39,870	74.30	+11.53	
Eligible voters		53,660			
Conservative notional hold		Swing		−3.62	
Source: Elections Canada
Note: number of eligible voters does not include voting day registrations.

2021 federal election redistributed results
Party	Vote	%
Conservative	16,954	52.83
Liberal	7,269	22.65
New Democratic	3,702	11.53
People's	2,320	7.23
Green	1,574	4.90
Independent	275	0.86
Total valid votes	32,094	99.33
Rejected ballots	218	0.67
Registered voters/ estimated turnout	51,479	62.77

=== Tobique—Mactaquac, 2013 representation order ===
This riding gained territory from Fredericton and lost territory to Miramichi—Grand Lake for the 42nd Canadian federal election.

2021 Canadian federal election
Party	Candidate	Votes	%	±%	Expenditures
Conservative	Richard Bragdon	17,536	50.98	+0.7	$45,965.28
Liberal	Cully Robinson	8,223	23.90	-1.3	$10,342.40
New Democratic	Meriet Gray Miller	3,656	10.63	+2.7	$0.00
People's	Daniel Joseph Waggoner	2,930	8.52	+6.0	$2,750.09
Green	Anthony Martin	1,657	4.82	-9.3	$5,670.46
Independent	Steven J. LaForest	398	1.15	N/A	$0.00
Total valid votes/expense limit		34,400	99.2	–	$107,922.33
Total rejected ballots		291	0.8		
Turnout		34,691	62.0		
Registered voters		55,973			
Conservative hold		Swing		+1.0	
Source: Elections Canada

2019 Canadian federal election
Party	Candidate	Votes	%	±%	Expenditures
Conservative	Richard Bragdon	19,229	50.34	+13.32	$31,254.86
Liberal	Kelsey MacDonald	9,631	25.21	-21.40	$12,723.90
Green	Rowan P. Miller	5,398	14.13	+9.03	$11,462.77
New Democratic	Megan Aiken	3,007	7.87	-3.41	$0.00
People's	Dominic Guay	936	2.45	-	$402.50
Total valid votes/expense limit		38,201	100.00		
Total rejected ballots		376	0.97	+0.33	
Turnout		38,577	70.01	-0.78	
Eligible voters		55,104			
Conservative gain from Liberal		Swing		+17.36	
Source: Elections Canada

2015 Canadian federal election
Party	Candidate	Votes	%	±%	Expenditures
Liberal	T. J. Harvey	17,909	46.61	+30.38	$67,600.14
Conservative	Richard Bragdon	14,225	37.02	-25.12	$57,487.20
New Democratic	Robert Kitchen	4,334	11.28	-7.86	$6,199.56
Green	Terry Wishart	1,959	5.10	+2.62	$3,275.40
Total valid votes/expense limit		38,427	100.00		$204,512.49
Total rejected ballots		248	0.64	–	
Turnout		38,675	71.79	–	
Eligible voters		53,870			
Liberal gain from Conservative		Swing		+27.75	
Source: Elections Canada

2011 federal election redistributed results
Party	Vote	%
Conservative	21,410	62.14
New Democratic	6,594	19.14
Liberal	5,591	16.23
Green	853	2.48
Others	7	0.02

=== Tobique—Mactaquac, 2003 representation order ===
2011 Canadian federal election
Party	Candidate	Votes	%	±%	Expenditures
Conservative	Mike Allen	21,108	62.70	+5.21	$44,047.06
New Democratic	Pierre Cyr	6,388	18.98	+3.61	$4,796.14
Liberal	Charles Chiasson	5,337	15.85	-5.70	$29,831.59
Green	Rish McGlynn	831	2.47	-3.29	$5.82
Total valid votes/expense limit		33,664	100.0		$84,385.35
Total rejected, unmarked and declined ballots		256	0.75	-0.33	
Turnout		33,920	63.91	+4.18	
Eligible voters		53,073			
Conservative hold		Swing		+0.80	

2008 Canadian federal election
Party	Candidate	Votes	%	±%	Expenditures
Conservative	Mike Allen	18,071	57.49	+13.70	$61,678.30
Liberal	Sally McGrath	6,773	21.55	-21.32	$26,392.40
New Democratic	Alice Finnamore	4,830	15.37	+3.87	$8,535.56
Green	Mark Glass	1,810	5.76	+3.89	$1,492.00
Total valid votes/expense limit		31,433	100.0		$81,901
Total rejected, unmarked and declined ballots		343	1.08	+0.04	
Turnout		31,776	59.73	-8.02	
Eligible voters		53,203			
Conservative hold		Swing		+17.51	

2006 Canadian federal election
Party	Candidate	Votes	%	±%	Expenditures
Conservative	Mike Allen	15,894	43.79	+4.20	$66,976.92
Liberal	Andy Savoy	15,558	42.87	-5.36	$70,900.54
New Democratic	Alice Finnamore	4,172	11.50	+3.00	$9,442.17
Green	Robert Bérubé Jr.	679	1.87	-1.81	none listed
Total valid votes/expense limit		36,292	100.0		$76,462
Total rejected, unmarked and declined ballots		383	1.04		
Turnout		36,675	67.75	+3.75	
Eligible voters		54,135			
Conservative gain from Liberal		Swing		+4.78	

2004 Canadian federal election
Party	Candidate	Votes	%	±%	Expenditures
Liberal	Andy Savoy	16,787	48.23	+15.82	$74,481.32
Conservative	Mike Allen	13,779	39.59	-24.32	$60,455.56
New Democratic	Jason Mapplebeck	2,957	8.50	+4.82	$1,645.00
Green	Scott Jones	1,282	3.68	–	$882.20
Total valid votes/expense limit		34,805	100.0		$74,648
Total rejected, unmarked and declined ballots		349	1.0		
Turnout		35,154	64.00	-2.29	
Eligible voters		54,931			
Liberal notional gain from Progressive Conservative		Swing		+20.07	
Changes from 2000 are based on redistributed results. Conservative Party change is based on the combination of Canadian Alliance and Progressive Conservative Party totals.

2000 federal election redistributed results
Party	Vote	%
Progressive Conservative	11,708	33.80
Liberal	11,225	32.41
Alliance	10,428	30.11
New Democratic	1,273	3.68

=== Tobique—Mactaquac, 1996 representation order ===
2000 Canadian federal election
Party	Candidate	Votes	%	±%
Liberal	Andy Savoy	10,900	33.6	+3.4
Progressive Conservative	Gilles Bernier	10,750	33.1	-2.8
Alliance	Adam Richardson	9,570	29.5	+1.8
New Democratic	Carolyn Van Dine	1,216	3.7	-2.5
Total		32,436	100.0	

1997 Canadian federal election
Party	Candidate	Votes	%
Progressive Conservative	Gilles Bernier	12,125	35.9
Liberal	Pierrette Ringuette	10,190	30.2
Reform	Ivan Shaw	9,371	27.7
New Democratic	Leslie Ann Ferguson	2,093	6.2
Total		33,779	100.0

== See also ==
- List of Canadian electoral districts
- Historical federal electoral districts of Canada
