= Mike Allen (New Brunswick politician) =

Canadian politician

Michael Allen

Member of Parliament for Tobique—Mactaquac
- In office January 23, 2006 – August 4, 2015
- Preceded by: Andy Savoy
- Succeeded by: TJ Harvey

Personal details
- Born: November 20, 1960 (age 65) Fredericton, New Brunswick, Canada
- Party: Conservative
- Spouse: Jennifer Allen
- Profession: Management consultant

Michael Allen, better known as Mike Allen, (born November 20, 1960, in Fredericton, New Brunswick) is a Canadian politician. He represented the riding of Tobique—Mactaquac as a member of the Conservative Party of Canada in the House of Commons of Canada from 2006 to 2015, when he chose to retire from Parliament.

Allen first ran for office in the 2004 federal election but was defeated by incumbent Andy Savoy by a margin of 3008 votes. However, Allen defeated Savoy in the 2006 election by a narrow margin of 254 votes.

== Post-Parliamentary career ==
=== Run for Chairmanship of the New Brunswick Progressive-Conservatives ===
In 2016, Allen ran for the leadership of the Progressive Conservative Party of New Brunswick. One of seven candidates, he won 16.25% of the vote in the October 22nd Convention's first round. In the second round, he won 20.22%, coming in last place, and being eliminated as a result.

=== Campaign Finance Violations ===
In July 2018, Allen was charged with campaign finance violations during his bid for the chairmanship of Progressive Conservative Party of New Brunswick, under the claim that he and his wife donated a sum of over $6,000 to his campaign, hence passing the contribution limit. In May 2019, he pleaded guilty to violations of campaign finance law, and was made to pay $10,000 in Fines.

== Electoral history ==
2011 Canadian federal election: Tobique—Mactaquac
| Party | Candidate | Votes | % | ±% | Expenditures |
|---|---|---|---|---|---|
| Conservative | Mike Allen | 21,108 | 62.70 | +5.21 | $44,047.06 |
| New Democratic | Pierre Cyr | 6,388 | 18.98 | +3.61 | $4,796.14 |
| Liberal | Charles Chiasson | 5,337 | 15.85 | -5.70 | $29,831.59 |
| Green | Rish McGlynn | 831 | 2.47 | -3.29 | $5.82 |
| Total valid votes/expense limit | | 33,664 | 100.0 | | $84,385.35 |
| Total rejected, unmarked and declined ballots | | 256 | 0.75 | -0.33 | |
| Turnout | | 33,920 | 63.91 | +4.18 | |
| Eligible voters | | 53,073 | | | |
| Conservative hold | | Swing | | +0.80 | |

2008 Canadian federal election: Tobique—Mactaquac
| Party | Candidate | Votes | % | ±% | Expenditures |
|---|---|---|---|---|---|
| Conservative | Mike Allen | 18,071 | 57.49 | +13.70 | $61,678.30 |
| Liberal | Sally McGrath | 6,773 | 21.55 | -21.32 | $26,392.40 |
| New Democratic | Alice Finnamore | 4,830 | 15.37 | +3.87 | $8,535.56 |
| Green | Mark Glass | 1,810 | 5.76 | +3.89 | $1,492.00 |
| Total valid votes/expense limit | | 31,433 | 100.0 | | $81,901 |
| Total rejected, unmarked and declined ballots | | 343 | 1.08 | +0.04 | |
| Turnout | | 31,776 | 59.73 | -8.02 | |
| Eligible voters | | 53,203 | | | |
| Conservative hold | | Swing | | +17.51 | |

2006 Canadian federal election: Tobique—Mactaquac
| Party | Candidate | Votes | % | ±% | Expenditures |
|---|---|---|---|---|---|
| Conservative | Mike Allen | 15,894 | 43.79 | +4.20 | $66,976.92 |
| Liberal | Andy Savoy | 15,558 | 42.87 | -5.36 | $70,900.54 |
| New Democratic | Alice Finnamore | 4,172 | 11.50 | +3.00 | $9,442.17 |
| Green | Robert Bérubé Jr. | 679 | 1.87 | -1.81 | none listed |
| Total valid votes/expense limit | | 36,292 | 100.0 | | $76,462 |
| Total rejected, unmarked and declined ballots | | 383 | 1.04 | | |
| Turnout | | 36,675 | 67.75 | +3.75 | |
| Eligible voters | | 54,135 | | | |
| Conservative gain from Liberal | | Swing | | +4.78 | |
