= 59th New Brunswick Legislature =

- Minority parliament
- October 23, 2018 – August 17, 2020

Parliament leaders
- Premier: Hon. Brian Gallant; October 7, 2014 – November 9, 2018
- Hon. Blaine Higgs; November 9, 2018 – August 17, 2020
- Leader of the Opposition: Blaine Higgs; October 22, 2016 – November 9, 2018
- Brian Gallant; November 9, 2018 – February 14, 2019
- Denis Landry; February 14, 2019 – August 17, 2020

Party caucuses
- Government: Liberal Party (Note: The Liberal Party briefly formed government but was defeated in a confidence vote on November 1, 2018.) (until November 2018)
- Progressive Conservative Party (after November 2018)
- Opposition: Progressive Conservative Party (until November 2018)
- Liberal Party (after November 2018)
- Recognized: People's Alliance (Note: The People's Alliance provided confidence and supply for the new PC government.)
- Green Party

Legislative Assembly
- Speaker of the Assembly: Hon. Daniel Guitard; October 23, 2018 – August 17, 2020
- Members: 49 MLA seats

Sovereign
- Monarch: Elizabeth II; February 6, 1952 – September 8, 2022
- Lieutenant Governor: Jocelyne Roy-Vienneau; October 23, 2014 – August 2, 2019
- Brenda Murphy; September 8, 2019 – January 22, 2025

Sessions
- 1st session October 23, 2018 – November 20, 2018
- 2nd session November 20, 2018 – August 17, 2020
← 58th	→ 60th

The 59th New Brunswick Legislative Assembly consisted of the members elected in the 2018 general election and subsequent by-elections. The legislature was dissolved on August 17, 2020, in advance of the 2020 New Brunswick general election.

== Party standings ==
Standings in the 59th New Brunswick Legislature
Affiliation	Members	
Affiliation	2018 Election Results	As of 14 February 2020
Progressive Conservative	22	20
Liberal	21	20
Green	3	
People's Alliance	3	
Independent	0	1
Vacant	0	2
Total members	49	47
Total seats	49	

== Leadership ==
The incumbent Premier of New Brunswick Brian Gallant (Liberal) received permission from Lieutenant Governor Jocelyne Roy-Vienneau to attempt to form a minority government. While Gallant's Liberals finished second in the election by one seat to the Progressive Conservatives, neither party had enough seats to constitute a majority and as incumbent Gallant was given the opportunity first to attempt to form a government.

On November 2, 2018, Gallant's minority government was defeated by a non-confidence vote. Roy-Vienneau then asked Blaine Higgs of the Progressive Conservative party, to form a minority government on November 9, 2018.

== History ==
The election resulted in the first minority government in New Brunswick since 1920. Despite the fact that the Progressive Conservatives ended up winning one more seat than his party, premier Brian Gallant sought and received permission to attempt to form a government. Following Gallant's government's defeat in a non-confidence vote (November 1), Blaine Higgs was appointed as the new premier on November 9, shortly after Gallant's resignation earlier that day.

== Seating plan ==
		J.LeBlanc	K.Chiasson	Horsman	Lowe	McKee	D'Amours
		Bourque	F.Landry	Thériault	LePage	C.Chiasson	M.LeBlanc		Arseneau	Gauvin
	Arseneault	Melanson	D.LANDRY	Rogers	Harvey	Harris	Kenny	COON	Mitton
Guitard
	Holder	Savoie	HIGGS	Steeves	Shephard			AUSTIN	Conroy
	S.Wilson	Flemming	Anderson-Mason	Fitch	Stewart	Cardy		DeSaulniers
	Wetmore	M.Wilson	Carr	Holland	Urquhart	Oliver
	Northrup	Fairgrieve	Crossman

== Members ==
Name	Party	Riding	First elected / previously elected	Notes
Mike Holland	Progressive Conservative	Albert	2018 g.e.	
Denis Landry	Liberal	Bathurst East-Nepisiguit-Saint-Isidore	1995 g.e. 2003 g.e.	Opposition Leader
Brian Kenny	Liberal	Bathurst West-Beresford	2003 g.e.	
Guy Arseneault	Liberal	Campbellton-Dalhousie	2018 g.e.	
Isabelle Thériault	Liberal	Caraquet	2018 g.e.	
Stewart Fairgrieve	Progressive Conservative	Carleton	2015 by-e.	
Andrew Harvey	Liberal	Carleton-Victoria	2014 g.e.	
Carl Urquhart	Progressive Conservative	Carleton-York	2006 g.e.	
Roger Melanson	Liberal	Dieppe	2010 g.e.	
Jean-Claude D'Amours	Liberal	Edmundston-Madawaska Centre	2018 g.e.	
Kris Austin	People's Alliance	Fredericton-Grand Lake	2018 g.e.	Third Party Leader
Stephen Horsman	Liberal	Fredericton North	2014 g.e.	
David Coon	Green	Fredericton South	2014 g.e.	Third Party Leader
Dominic Cardy	Progressive Conservative	Fredericton West-Hanwell	2018 g.e.	
Rick DeSaulniers	People's Alliance	Fredericton-York	2018 g.e.	
Andrea Anderson-Mason	Progressive Conservative	Fundy-The Isles-Saint John West	2018 g.e.	
Ross Wetmore	Progressive Conservative	Gagetown-Petitcodiac	2010 g.e.	
Gary Crossman	Progressive Conservative	Hampton	2014 g.e.	
Kevin Arseneau	Green	Kent North	2018 g.e.	
Benoît Bourque	Liberal	Kent South	2014 g.e.	
Bill Oliver	Progressive Conservative	Kings Centre	2014 g.e.	
Francine Landry	Liberal	Madawaska les Lacs-Edmundston	2014 g.e.	
Megan Mitton	Green	Memramcook-Tantramar	2018 g.e.	
Michelle Conroy	People's Alliance	Miramichi	2018 g.e.	
Lisa Harris	Liberal	Miramichi Bay-Neguac	2014 g.e.	
Rob McKee	Liberal	Moncton Centre	2018 g.e.	
Monique LeBlanc	Liberal	Moncton East	2014 g.e.	
Ernie Steeves	Progressive Conservative	Moncton Northwest	2014 g.e.	
Cathy Rogers	Liberal	Moncton South	2014 g.e.	
Sherry Wilson	Progressive Conservative	Moncton Southwest	2010 g.e.	
Jeff Carr	Progressive Conservative	New Maryland-Sunbury	2014 g.e.	
Mary Wilson	Progressive Conservative	Oromocto-Lincoln-Fredericton	2018 g.e.	
Trevor Holder	Progressive Conservative	Portland-Simonds	1999 g.e.	
Blaine Higgs	Progressive Conservative	Quispamsis	2010 g.e.	Premier
Daniel Guitard	Liberal	Restigouche-Chaleur	2014 g.e.	Speaker
Gilles LePage	Liberal	Restigouche West	2014 g.e.	
Bruce Fitch	Progressive Conservative	Riverview	2003 g.e.	
Ted Flemming	Progressive Conservative	Rothesay	2012 by-e.	
Greg Thompson	Progressive Conservative	Saint Croix	2018 g.e.	Died September 10, 2019
Vacant		Saint Croix		By-election date TBA
Glen Savoie	Progressive Conservative	Saint John East	2010 g.e. 2014 by.e.	
Gerry Lowe	Liberal	Saint John Harbour	2018 g.e.	
Dorothy Shephard	Progressive Conservative	Saint John Lancaster	2010 g.e.	
Brian Gallant	Liberal	Shediac Bay-Dieppe	2013 by-e.	Resigned Seat October 7, 2019
Vacant		Shediac Bay-Dieppe		
Jacques LeBlanc	Liberal	Shediac-Beaubassin-Cap-Pelé	2018 g.e.	
Robert Gauvin	Progressive Conservative	Shippagan-Lamèque-Miscou	2018 g.e.	
Robert Gauvin	Independent	Shippagan-Lamèque-Miscou	2018 g.e.	Changed party affiliation on February 14, 2020, due to policy disputes.
Jake Stewart	Progressive Conservative	Southwest Miramichi-Bay du Vin	2010 g.e.	
Bruce Northrup	Progressive Conservative	Sussex-Fundy-St. Martins	2006 g.e.	
Keith Chiasson	Liberal	Tracadie-Sheila	2018 g.e.	
Chuck Chiasson	Liberal	Victoria-la-Vallée	2014 g.e.	

=== Standings changes in the 59th Assembly ===
Number of members per party by date	2019			2020
Number of members per party by date	Apr 20	Sep 10	Oct 7	Feb 14
Progressive Conservative	22	21		20
Liberal	21		20	
Green	3			
People's Alliance	3			
Independent	0			1
Total members	49	48	47	
Vacant	0	1	2	
Government Majority				
Government Majority	–5	–6	–5	–6

Membership changes in the 59th Assembly
Date	Name	District	Party	Reason
September 24, 2018	See List of Members			Election day of the 2018 New Brunswick general election
September 10, 2019	Greg Thompson	Saint Croix	Progressive Conservative	Death
October 7, 2019	Brian Gallant	Shediac Bay-Dieppe	Liberal	Resignation
February 14, 2020	Robert Gauvin	Shippagan-Lamèque-Miscou	Independent	Left the Progressive Conservative Caucus due to policy differences.

== See also ==
- 2014 New Brunswick general election
- 2018 New Brunswick general election
- Legislative Assembly of New Brunswick
