= 2024 New Brunswick general election =

Canadian provincial election

- October 21, 2024

49 seats in the Legislative Assembly of New Brunswick 25 seats needed for a majority
- Opinion polls
- Turnout: 66.1% (▼0.04 pp)
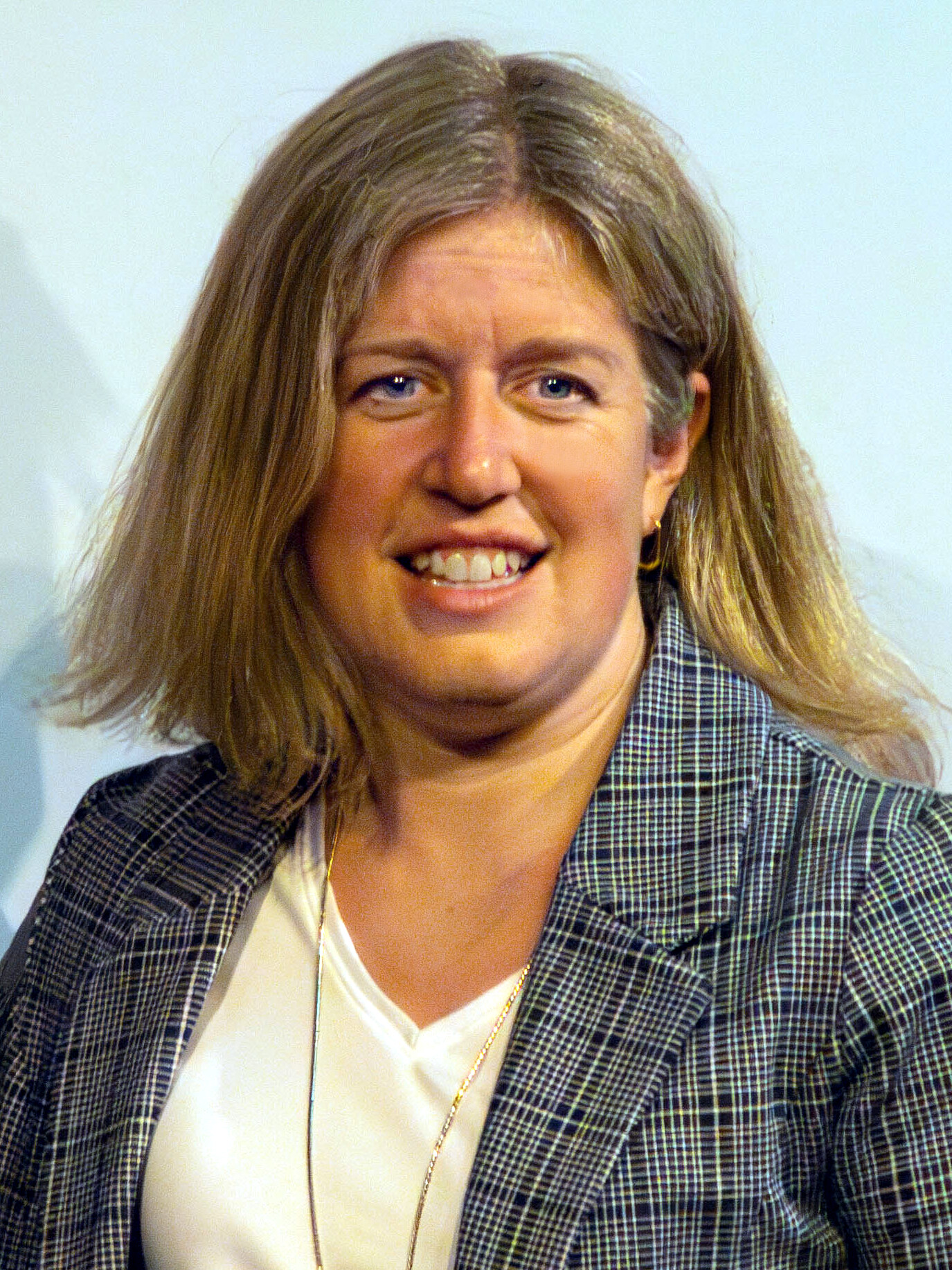

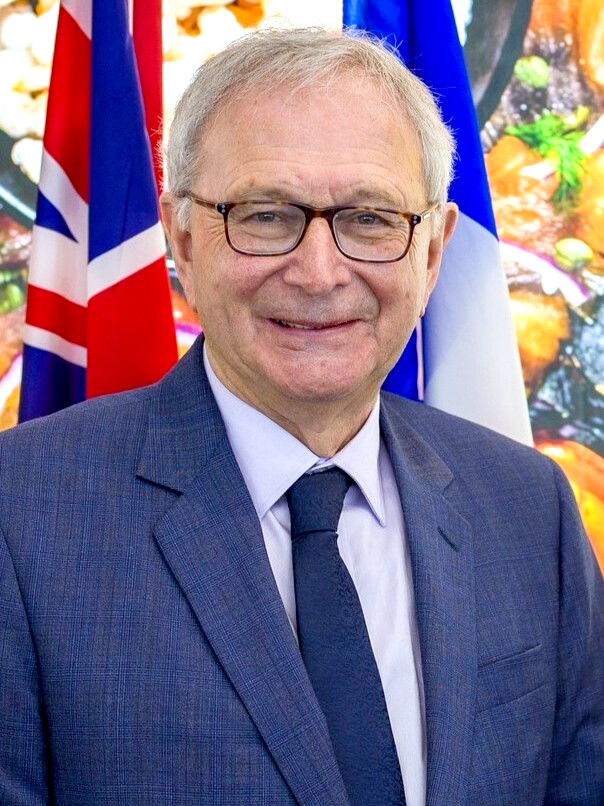

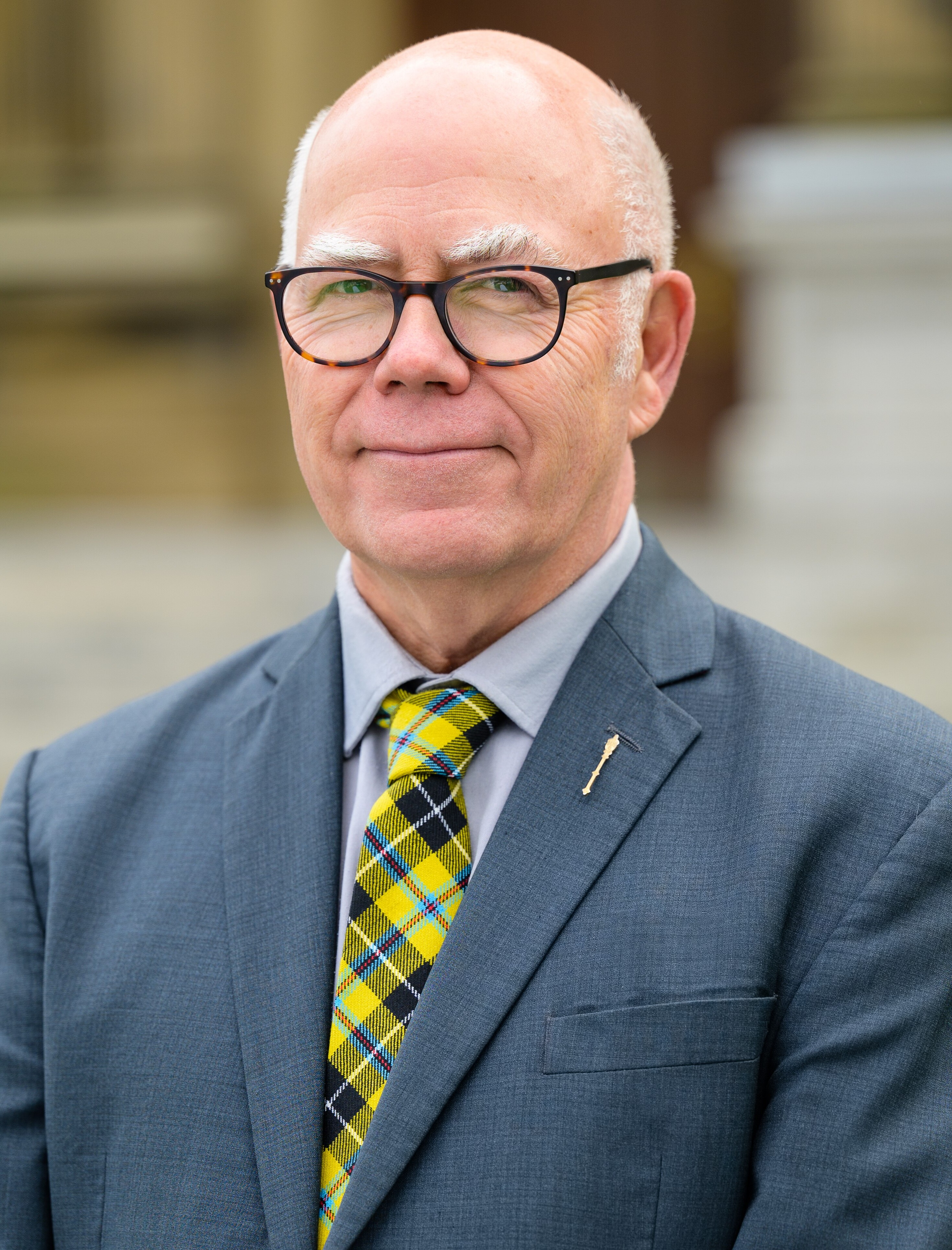

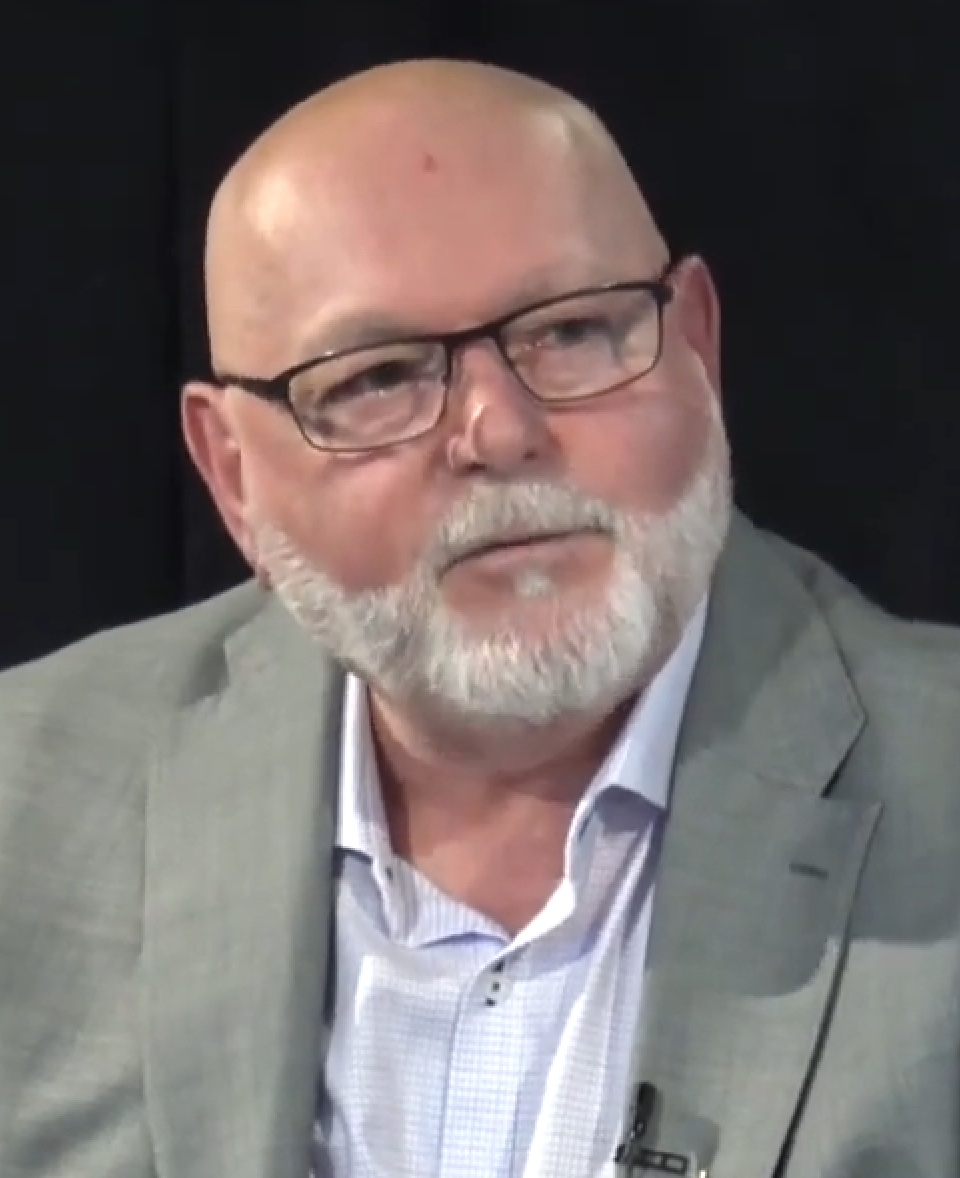
	First party	Second party
Leader	Susan Holt	Blaine Higgs
Party	Liberal	Progressive Conservative
Leader since	August 6, 2022	October 22, 2016
Leader's seat	Fredericton South-Silverwood (Note: Holt was the incumbent MLA for Bathurst East-Nepisiguit-Saint-Isidore, but chose to run in her home riding of Fredericton South-Silverwood, newly created by redistribution.)	Quispamsis (lost re-election)
Last election	17 seats, 34.35%	27 seats, 39.34%
Seats before	16	25
Seats won	31	16
Seat change	▲15	▼9
Popular vote	180,803	131,329
Percentage	48.24%	35.04%
Swing	▲13.89%	▼4.30%
	Third party	Fourth party
Leader	David Coon	Rick DeSaulniers
Party	Green	People's Alliance
Leader since	September 22, 2012	April 22, 2022
Leader's seat	Fredericton-Lincoln (Note: Coon was the incumbent MLA for Fredericton South, but chose to run in Fredericton-Lincoln after his riding was dissolved by redistribution.)	Ran in Fredericton-Grand Lake (lost)
Last election	3 seats, 15.24%	2 seats, 9.19%
Seats before	3	0
Seats won	2	0
Seat change	▼1	Steady
Popular vote	51,558	3,265
Percentage	13.76%	0.87%
Swing	▼1.48%	▼8.32%
Premier before election
Blaine Higgs
Progressive Conservative
Premier after election
Susan Holt
Liberal

The 2024 New Brunswick general election was held on October 21, 2024, where 49 members were elected to the Legislative Assembly of New Brunswick. It was formally called upon the dissolution of the 60th New Brunswick Legislature on September 19, 2024.

The incumbent Progressive Conservative Party of New Brunswick (PC) government, led by Premier Blaine Higgs since 2018, sought re-election to a third consecutive term. The party was defeated by the New Brunswick Liberal Association, led by Susan Holt, with them set to form a majority government in a landslide victory. Higgs was defeated in his own riding of Quispamsis, the first time since 1987 that a sitting New Brunswick Premier lost in their own riding. Upon taking office, Holt became the first woman premier of New Brunswick.

== 2023 redistribution ==
The Electoral Boundaries and Representation Commission is obliged after every second general election to investigate and report whether boundary adjustments are required to the Province's constituencies. It was required to ensure that revised constituencies have populations that fall within 25% of the determined electoral quotient, and it made its report with recommendations in March 2023.

Objections were raised as to the alignments proposed for Shediac-Cap-Acadie and Tantramar, specifically with respect to the eastern portion of Cap-Acadie (a francophone-majority town) having been placed in the latter, and special legislation was passed to allow a variance in the proposed boundaries.

The following changes took effect:

Abolished	New
Renaming of constituencies
Carleton	Woodstock-Hartland
Edmundston-Madawaska Centre	Edmundston-Vallée-des-Rivières
Fundy-The Isles-Saint John West	Fundy-The Isles-Saint John Lorneville
Gagetown-Petitcodiac	Arcadia-Butternut Valley-Maple Hills
Hampton	Hampton-Fundy-St. Martins
Kent South	Beausoleil-Grand-Bouctouche-Kent
Portland-Simonds	Saint John Portland-Simonds
Saint John Lancaster	Saint John West-Lancaster
Shediac-Beaubassin-Cap-Pelé	Shediac-Cap-Acadie
Shippagan-Lamèque-Miscou	Shippagan-Les-Îles
Sussex-Fundy-St. Martins	Sussex-Three Rivers
Victoria-La Vallée	Grand Falls-Vallée-des-Rivières-Saint-Quentin
Abolition of constituencies
Tracadie-Sheila	
Drawn from other constituencies
	Champdoré-Irishtown (Note: from parts of Moncton East, Shediac Bay-Dieppe, Kent South and Moncton Northwest.)
	Tracadie (Note: from parts of Tracadie-Sheila, Bathurst East-Nepisiguit-Saint-Isidore, Shippagan-Lamèque-Miscou and Caraquet.)
Merger of constituencies
Albert; Moncton Southwest	Albert-Riverview
Reorganization of constituencies
Bathurst East-Nepisiguit-Saint-Isidore; Bathurst West-Beresford; Campbellton-Dalhousie; Restigouche-Chaleur	Bathurst; Belle-Baie-Belledune; Hautes-Terres-Nepisiguit; Restigouche East
Dieppe; Memramcook-Tantramar	Dieppe-Memramcook; Tantramar
Fredericton South; Fredericton West-Hanwell; New Maryland-Sunbury; Oromocto-Lincoln-Fredericton	Fredericton-Lincoln; Fredericton South-Silverwood; Hanwell-New Maryland; Oromocto-Sunbury
Miramichi; Southwest Miramichi-Bay du Vin	Miramichi East; Miramichi West

Of the 49 constituencies, 17 have Francophone majorities:

Northern Region

- Restigouche West
- Restigouche East
- Belle-Baie-Belledune
- Bathurst
- Hautes-Terres-Nepisiguit
- Caraquet
- Shippagan-Les-Îles
- Tracadie

Southeast Region

- Kent North
- Beausoleil-Grand-Bouctouche-Kent
- Shediac Bay-Dieppe
- Shediac-Cap-Acadie
- Dieppe-Memramcook
- Champdoré-Irishtown

Upper River Valley Region

- Grand Falls-Vallée-des-Rivières-Saint-Quentin
- Edmundston-Vallée-des-Rivières
- Madawaska Les Lacs-Edmundston

== Background ==
The Legislative Assembly Act was amended in 2017 to provide that an election should be held every four years on the third Monday in October; the election still must be held on a Monday if called sooner.

=== Minor party deregistrations and registrations ===
On October 31, 2020, after failing to nominate ten candidates in the 2020 election, the KISS NB was deregistered.

On March 30, 2022, Kris Austin and Michelle Conroy announced their departures from the People's Alliance to join the Progressive Conservatives explaining they believed they could better represent their ridings from within government. Premier and Progressive Conservative leader Blaine Higgs reiterated the party's support for official bilingualism when questioned about the People's Alliance's previous stances on the issue which were criticized by the Acadian Society of New Brunswick. The Peoples Alliance was deregistered on March 31, 2022, but re-registered by interim leader Rick DeSaulniers in May 2022.

The Libertarian Party of New Brunswick was registered in July 2024, and put forward candidates in 18 ridings.

In September 2024, the Social Justice Party of New Brunswick and the Consensus NB Party were created, however both failed to nominate at least 10 candidates as required to maintain party status and each will be deregistered following the 2024 election.

=== Current standings ===
Standings in the 60th Legislature of New Brunswick
Affiliation	Assembly members	
Affiliation	2020 election results	At dissolution
Progressive Conservative	27	25
Liberal	17	16
Green	3	3
People's Alliance	2	0
Independent	0	1
Vacant		4
Total members	49	45
Total seats	49	49

=== Summary of seat changes ===
Changes in seats held (2020–present)
Seat	Before				Change		
Seat	Date	Member	Party	Reason	Date	Member	Party
Southwest Miramichi-Bay du Vin	August 17, 2021	Jake Stewart	█ PC	Resigned to run in Miramichi—Grand Lake in the 2021 federal election (Stewart was elected).	June 20, 2022	Mike Dawson	█ PC
Miramichi Bay-Neguac	August 17, 2021	Lisa Harris	█ Liberal	Resigned to run in Miramichi—Grand Lake in the 2021 federal election (Stewart was elected).	June 20, 2022	Réjean Savoie	█ PC
Fredericton-Grand Lake	March 30, 2022	Kris Austin	█ People's Allnc.	Changed affiliation, resigning as People's Alliance leader and announcing his intention to deregister the party.			█ PC
Miramichi	March 30, 2022	Michelle Conroy	█ People's Allnc.	Changed affiliation.			█ PC
Fredericton West-Hanwell	October 16, 2022	Dominic Cardy	█ PC	Expelled from the PC caucus having resigned his ministerial role.			█ Independent
Dieppe	October 21, 2022	Roger Melanson	█ Liberal	Resigned to head to the private sector.	April 24, 2023	Richard Losier	█ Liberal
Restigouche-Chaleur	November 27, 2022	Daniel Guitard	█ Liberal	Resigned to run for Mayor of Belle-Baie in 2022 elections; elected.	April 24, 2023	Marco LeBlanc	█ Liberal
Bathurst East-Nepisiguit-Saint-Isidore	November 27, 2022	Denis Landry	█ Liberal	Resigned to run for Mayor of Hautes-Terres in 2022 elections; elected.	April 24, 2023	Susan Holt	█ Liberal
Saint John Harbour	February 8, 2024	Arlene Dunn	█ PC	Resigned.			
Portland-Simonds	April 30, 2024	Trevor Holder	█ PC	Resigned.			
Hampton	April 30, 2024	Gary Crossman	█ PC	Resigned.			
Albert	June 20, 2024	Mike Holland	█ PC	Resigned (after final legislative session).			

== Issues ==
=== Education ===
New Brunswick has been experiencing major education shortcomings during the 2020s, with the province experiencing massive shortages in teachers and school psychologists, along with school bus drivers in some areas. Schools throughout the province have also reported exceptionally low child literacy rates, with a 2021–22 report concluding that literacy standards were not met by around 40% of the province's fourth grade students, the lowest it has been in 18 years. Kelly Lamrock, the New Brunswick Child and Youth advocate, further reported that child literacy rates had declined by 29% over the past decade. After being released in November 2023, the 2022–23 report for fourth grade student literacy rates showed further decline, with 43.4% scoring "below appropriate achievement" after being assessed for English reading.

In late 2023, the New Brunswick Teachers' Association (NBTA) called for the provincial government to address concerns raised from an internal survey of its members. Among the concerns noted were "understaffed classrooms and overcrowded buildings, with uncertified community members, people without a bachelor of education, sometimes taking the place of actual teachers because of shortages." Many of the 2,916 survey participants reported teaching in overcrowded and poorly ventilated schools, with half also experiencing verbal and physical abuse. Those who called for these issues to be addressed included Liberal leader Susan Holt as well as Kevin Arseneau, a Green MLA for Kent North.

In May 2024, the NBTA projected over 1,200 anglophone teachers that will be eligible for retirement within the next five years, with Peter Lagacy, the NBTA president, adding that this is "an alarming number when we look at how many we have coming into the system."

==== Staff shortages ====
New Brunswick's public school system has been notably experiencing shortages in teachers, school psychologists and, in certain areas, bus drivers.

While proposing changes for Policy 713, Higgs proposed for "extra counsellors, extra support." According to figures from November 2023, however, the number of school psychologists dropped; out of a total of 28 "full-time equivalent" school psychologist positions filled throughout the province, only six served the province's English school system of approximately 73,000 students.

==== School busing shortcomings ====
An audit which took place between January and February in 2024 concluded that the provincial Department of Education "lacks oversight on school bus safety and driver requirements." Using a sample size of 65 bus drivers out of a total of around 1,300, the audit reported that 46% of New Brunswick's school bus drivers had ineligible licensing requirements. Additionally, 20% were hired without checking for criminal records, and further percentages of bus drivers had no evidence of bus training (37%) and first aid training (42%). The audit also conducted vehicle inspections on a number of buses, with 45% having deficiencies. Francine Landry, the Liberal MLA for Madawaska Les Lacs-Edmundston, criticized the provincial government led by Higgs for "touting their record on keeping children safe, while failing to fulfil the most basic requirements for doing so." Education Minister Bill Hogan responded, saying that "clearly there's some work to be done in that area in making sure that they're inspected on time."

==== Policy 713 ====
Policy 713, a provincial education policy which sets minimum requirements for public schools and districts in the province related to individuals identifying and perceived as LGBTQIA2S+, became the subject of massive debate following a 2023 decision made to review and ultimately revise the policy by the Progressive Conservative-led government under Higgs and Bill Hogan, the Minister of Education and Early Childhood Development. In the aftermath of its revision, a third of the Progressive Conservative caucus members elected under Higgs have either resigned or announced that they would not seek re-election, with some criticizing Higgs' leadership and highlighting a growing disconnect between their personal beliefs and the party's stance. The revision has led to the government becoming involved in legal disputes with its education departments as well as with the Canadian Civil Liberties Association, who filed a lawsuit against the government, citing violations against the Canadian Charter of Rights and Freedoms and New Brunswick's human rights and education acts. The issue has been the subject of widespread coverage and dispute, and has been covered by major news publications including The Washington Post, The New York Times, and BBC.

Lindsay Jones of The Globe And Mail called the Policy 713 dispute as having "emerged as perhaps the key issue in the next election."

=== Healthcare ===
Healthcare in New Brunswick has been described as being in a "state of chaos," with hospitals throughout the province experiencing an overcapacity of patients, excessively long waiting times, and health workers experiencing burnout. During a February 2023 press conference, Blaine Higgs stated that "if every doctor in our province took two or three more patients a week, we wouldn't have a backlog." In an Angus Reid survey that recorded Canadians' satisfaction with how their province is dealing with healthcare, New Brunswick recorded the largest drop in satisfaction rate compared to rates surveyed at the beginning of the COVID-19 pandemic, with a rate of just 11 percent, compared to a previous rate of 42 percent.

Following overcrowding at the Dr. Everett Chalmers Regional Hospital emergency room at the start of 2024, Green leader David Coon called for "immediate changes" as well as for the government to increase funding.

According to Rob McKee, the Liberal health critic, 160,000 people in New Brunswick, or roughly 20 percent of the population, do not have a family doctor or nurse practitioner as of late May 2024. The numbers were disputed by Bruce Fitch, the Minister of Health.

During the final session of the 60th legislature held on June 7, 2024, Higgs and Holt clashed during question period; one of the topics included the funding spent on travel nurses, amounting to nearly CA$174 million, which was revealed to have been "partly mismanaged" according to a report by the auditor general.

Both the Liberal and Green parties made promises to re-launch research efforts into the province's mysterious neurological disease upon forming majority government.

=== Housing ===
Since 2019, housing prices have nearly doubled in New Brunswick. In home prices, the province marked the highest percentage of increases compared to the rest of the Canadian provinces and territories. New Brunswick has also seen major increases in homelessness within its communities and cities, with Fredericton, Saint John, and Moncton collectively experiencing an 80% increase in homelessness between 2021 and 2023. Housing critics have claimed that "landlords have almost all the power" in the province.

Both the Liberal and Green parties have attempted to implement rent regulation in the province, with the right to housing being highlighted by the Green Party legislative members, whether to consider it a human right or to push for rural area housing rights. During a legislative session on November 20, 2020, held shortly after the opening of the 60th legislature, Green Party leader David Coon introduced Bill 18, which would have made changes to the Residential Tenancies Act, including a cap on annual rent increases as well as ensuring that "rent can only be raised once a year for a tenant and not in their first year." At the time, New Brunswick was the only province that allowed for landlords to make multiple increases on rent each year. Coon added that "we need to ensure that tenants who cannot afford large increases in their rents are not left out in the cold without housing this winter." After six months of debate, the bill was ultimately rejected after all Progressive Conservative and People's Alliance MLAs unanimously voted against it. The New Brunswick Coalition for Tenants Rights, who had criticized the proposed bill for "not going far enough," expressed disappointment in the government decision.

In March 2022, the government introduced a temporary 3.8% rent cap, set to expire at the end of the year. Opposition parties soon afterwards called for an extension on this cap, while it was opposed by the government. Coon, saying that the government has not "gone far enough to eliminate loopholes that allow landlords to get around the government's temporary cap on rent increases," also made proposals to the provincial bill to address loopholes in this legislation, but faced rejection from the majority Progressive Conservatives.

In December 2023, St. Stephen mayor Allan MacEachern declared a state of emergency due to an increase in homelessness after the recent death of a homeless person in the municipality; the declaration also accused the provincial government of failing to offer housing and social services. Public Safety Minister Kris Austin terminated the declaration soon afterwards, likening it to car accidents by saying that "people die all the time in car accidents, and we do not declare state of emergencies for that." Austin also blamed "leftist agendas that are degrading our society" as well as the federal government for the issue.

In June 2024, the provincial government quietly made changes to its renting policies, allowing for landlords to make annual rent increases for up to 4.7% for the next year starting in July 2024; this increase exceeds the current inflation rate. Coon criticized this change, calling out Higgs as "caving to the lobbying of large corporate property owners."

=== Out-of-province activities ===
New Brunswick, unlike most provinces, allows political party funding from non-residents. In January 2024, Liberal and Green leaders Holt and Coon both made a promise to forbid New Brunswick political party donations from out-of-province sources in response to Higgs going to Alberta and British Columbia on a fundraising trip for his party.

In August 2024, right-leaning lobbyist group Campaign Life Coalition mailed flyers to 160,000 homes in New Brunswick, making the accusation that schools in the province are "pushing transgenderism". Both Liberal and Green leaders condemned the flyers, with Higgs additionally having been urged to do so as well.

== Campaign ==
=== Candidates by Party ===
Party	Leader	Candidates
Progressive Conservative	Blaine Higgs	49
Liberal	Susan Holt	49
Green	David Coon	46
New Democratic	Alex White	23
Libertarian	Keith Tays	18
People's Alliance	Rick DeSaulniers	13
Independent		4
Consensus NB	Len O'Brien	3
Social Justice	Tanya Roberts	2

Candidate contests
Number of nominated candidates to appear on the ballot	Constituencies	Party									
Number of nominated candidates to appear on the ballot	Constituencies	PC	Lib	Grn	NDP	Ltn	PANB	Ind	CNB	SJP	Totals
2	2	2	2								4
3	11	11	11	10						1	33
4	18	18	18	18	8	6	3			1	72
5	11	11	11	11	8	6	4	2	2		55
6	6	6	6	6	6	5	5	1	1		36
7	1	1	1	1	1	1	1	1			7
Total	49	49	49	46	23	18	13	4	3	2	207

=== Progressive Conservative ===
In November 2023, the Progressive Conservatives hired Steve Outhouse as its campaign manager. Outhouse had previously served as chief of staff and as director of communications for federal Conservative cabinet ministers, and served as campaign manager for the re-election of the United Conservative Party in the 2023 Alberta general election. In April 2024, Outhouse was also hired as principal secretary to Premier Blaine Higgs, which is a taxpayer-funded position that will earn up to CA$124,656 during the six-month contract. The contract drew criticism from Green leader David Coon, who estimated the position's pay band as being at a much lower rate of CA$150,000–175,000 annually, as well as from Liberal MLA and former Progressive Conservative Robert Gauvin, who stated that it was "unfair that New Brunswick taxpayers are paying him for that," believing that "this contract should be cut and the money should be reimbursed." Higgs defended the value of the contract by reading extensively from Outhouse's resumé and stating that he comes with, "an extensive degree of credentials and relevant experience to what we experience as a government."

Jacques Poitras of CBC News described the Progressive Conservative campaign under Outhouse's contract as adopting "a more pointed, aggressive style of advertising against the opposition Liberals." The campaign particularly attacked Susan Holt while "trying to link her to Prime Minister Justin Trudeau's carbon tax and other policies." Jeff Carr, a Progressive Conservative MLA who previously announced that he would not be seeking candidacy in the election, criticized a post his party made targeting a 2014 quote by Holt regarding "closing some schools in the province." Carr stated that the post omitted important context "for political gain (misleading the electorate)," calling it "disappointing."

The Progressive Conservative party launched their re-election campaign at a Quispamsis church on September 19, 2024. Blaine Higgs received critical attention for telling a joke about a deceased Liberal voter at the end of his campaign launch speech, with Susan Holt describing it as "a complete lack of judgment on the premier's part". David Coon additionally criticized the joke, stating that "to call it a joke would suggest it was funny, and there was nothing funny about it".

The Progressive Conservative campaign has consisted of promoting its promise to lower the harmonized sales tax (HST) from 15% to 13%, and highlighting the fiscal surpluses under their government. The campaign has also promoted fears of an elected Liberal government taking the province "back into the red", referring to the consecutive deficits under the previous Liberal government, during which Susan Holt served as senior economic development advisor to then-Premier Brian Gallant.

The Progressive Conservatives released their campaign platform on October 12, 2024.

=== Liberal ===
Throughout the months leading up to the election, Liberal leader Susan Holt started distancing herself from Prime Minister Justin Trudeau amongst attacks from the Progressive Conservatives attempting to link them together throughout the decline in popularity for Trudeau. Holt stated that "the New Brunswick Liberal Party is a separate entity from the federal party the prime minister leads."

When asked by Brunswick News about her summer campaign plans, Holt shared plans of touring around the province and stopping by each riding, with 207 "touchpoints" with "festivals and celebrations," while also focusing on her home riding.

The Liberal party officially launched their election campaign in Fredericton on September 8, 2024.

The Liberals released their campaign platform on October 3, 2024. The platform's costing table was flagged by media and criticized by the Progressive Conservatives for a seeming mistake that resulted in counting a portion of HST revenue twice. The error suggests that instead of a net surplus of $549 million over five years, the platform's implementation would result in a net deficit of over $1 billion.

=== Greens ===
In late 2023, Green Party leader David Coon stated that his goal was to "elect as many Green MLAs as possible." Additionally, Coon proposed that he would be open to the idea of collaborating with the Liberals to prevent Higgs from remaining in power if an early election resulted in the PCs losing their majority. Coon's negotiation proposal reflected his stance from the 2018 election when he was willing to talk with both parties, prior to the Progressive Conservatives securing the backing from the People's Alliance.

Coon, like Holt, was also asked by Brunswick News about his campaign plans for the summer; he shared that he, along with his deputies, Kevin Arseneau and Megan Mitton, are going to be "fanning out across the province, launching new candidates' campaigns that haven't been launched yet, and attending festivals and events, and generally holding our own events as well." Coon said that the largest issues that all Green candidates have noticeably heard are healthcare, along with "affordability and affordable housing," adding that "People want to see change. They want to see change that's for the better, not change back." Coon also highlighted a lack in rural development in the province, mentioning that "there's plenty of talk about communities losing services" in rural areas.

The Green Party's fall campaign officially launched on September 18, 2024. During his campaign launch speech, Coon confirmed that he will have a "wish list" ready to bring into negotiations with other parties, in anticipation of the Green Party not forming government and no other party getting a majority of seats. Higgs has compared the Greens potentially providing confidence to a Liberal government to the "coalition" between the Liberal Party of Canada and the New Democratic Party at the federal level, despite the Liberal-NDP arrangement being a confidence and supply agreement and not a coalition as it's usually defined.

== Debates ==
On May 28, 2024, a CUPE Local 1292-sponsored leaders' debate covering the topic of healthcare was aired on Rogers TV; Blaine Higgs, Susan Holt and David Coon were invited to participate, though Higgs declined to attend.

On September 25, 2024, a leaders' debate between Higgs, Holt, and Coon took place at the Capitol Theatre in Moncton. The debate was aired on CBC Television and was moderated by Clare MacKenzie and Jacques Poitras.

On October 9, 2024, a leaders' debate between Holt, Coon, and Alex White took place at the Tom Morrison Theatre at Fredericton High School. Higgs and Rick DeSaulniers were invited but declined to attend. The debate was aired on Rogers TV and moderated by Andrew Holland.

On October 11, 2024, a Forum "Women Count!" with the party leaders was organized by the NB Coalition for Equity Pay. Susan Holt, David Coon and Alex White were present. Higgs declined the invitation. They discussed women issues in the Province. The Forum was broadcast on Rogers TV.

On October 16, 2024, a leaders' roundtable was held at St. Thomas University in Fredericton, hosted by CTV Atlantic.

== Opinion polls ==

Polling Firm	Last Date of Polling	Link	PC	Liberal	Green	PA	NDP	Margin of error	Sample size	Polling method	Lead
Election 2024	October 21, 2024	HTML	35.04	48.24	13.76	0.87	1.30	—N/a	—N/a	—N/a	13.20
Forum Research	October 20, 2024		37.1	45.7	10.7	2.0	2.7	±3.0 pp	2,428	IVR	8.6
Mainstreet Research	October 19, 2024		38	48	10	1	-	±3.6 pp	724	Smart IVR	10
Mainstreet Research	October 3, 2024		37	44	14	2	-	±3.3 pp	906	Smart IVR	7
Mainstreet Research	September 17, 2024		39	41	13	4	-	±4.0 pp	609	Smart IVR	2
Narrative Research	August 17, 2024		33	44	17	1	4	±4.9 pp	400	telephone	11
Nanos Research	July 31, 2024		36	36	14	5	10	±4.7 pp	447	telephone/online	0
Narrative Research	May 30, 2024		34	37	13	1	13	±4.9 pp	400	telephone	3
Narrative Research	February 22, 2024		34	40	15	2	8	±4.9 pp	400	telephone	6
Narrative Research	November 27, 2023		35	41	10	2	13	±4.9 pp	400	telephone	6
Narrative Research	August 21, 2023		36	38	16	1	8	±4.9 pp	400	telephone	2
Narrative Research	May 17, 2023		34	34	19	2	10	±4.9 pp	400	telephone	0
Narrative Research	February 25, 2023		37	35	17	2	9	±4.6 pp	450	telephone	2
Leger	December 23, 2022		22	40	15	9	12	±4.4 pp	500	online	18
Narrative Research	November 27, 2022		30	39	18	2	10	±4.0 pp	611	telephone	9
Narrative Research	August 24, 2022		30	41	14	5	11	±4.2 pp	525	telephone	11
Susan Holt is elected leader of the Liberal Party (August 6, 2022)
Angus Reid	June 13, 2022		31	36	14	5	13	±6.0 pp	247	online	5
Narrative Research	May 19, 2022		34	34	17	4	9	±4.0 pp	607	telephone	0
Nanos Research	April 11, 2022		36.6	38.8	14.2	1.2	8.6	±4.8 pp	423	online/telephone	2.2
Both People's Alliance MLAs join the Progressive Conservatives, with Kris Austin announcing intention to de-register the party (March 30, 2022)
Angus Reid	March 15, 2022		31	32	15	13	9	±6.0 pp	251	online	1
Narrative Research	February 27, 2022		34	31	16	5	11	±4.2 pp	545	telephone	3
Angus Reid	January 10, 2022		26	37	16	10	8	±7.0 pp	216	online	11
MQO Research	December 14, 2021		29	36	16	5	11	±4.9 pp	400	telephone (rolling)	7
Narrative Research	November 24, 2021		28	38	14	5	13	±3.5 pp	800	telephone	10
Stratcom	November 6, 2021		20.5	39.8	17.9	12.0	-	±2.8 pp	1,184	IVR	19.3
Angus Reid	October 3, 2021		31	31	12	12	13	±2.0 pp	265	online	0
Narrative Research	August 17, 2021		33	29	22	5	11	±2.0 pp	604	telephone	4
Angus Reid	June 7, 2021		36	31	17	12	4	±2.0 pp	248	online	5
Narrative Research	May 31, 2021		39	28	18	6	8	±3.5 pp	800	telephone (rolling)	11
MQO Research	March 18, 2021		38	31	17	5	6	±4.9 pp	400	telephone (rolling)	7
Narrative Research	February 17, 2021		35	32	20	6	6	±3.5 pp	800	telephone (rolling)	3
Narrative Research	November 22, 2020		41	28	20	4	6	±3.5 pp	800	telephone (rolling)	13
Kevin Vickers resigns as Liberal Party leader; MLA for Dieppe Roger Melanson becomes interim leader (September 14, 2020)
Election 2020	September 14, 2020	HTML	39.34	34.35	15.24	9.19	1.66	—N/a	—N/a	—N/a	4.99

== Candidates ==
Retiring incumbents
Affiliation (Note: At dissolution)	MLA	Constituency	Held office since
PC	Daniel Allain	Moncton East	2020
PC	Andrea Anderson-Mason	Fundy-The Isles-Saint John West	2018
PC	Jeff Carr	New Maryland-Sunbury	2014
PC	Bruce Fitch	Riverview	2003
PC	Dorothy Shephard	Saint John Lancaster	2010
PC	Ross Wetmore	Gagetown-Petitcodiac (Note: Previously MLA for Grand Lake-Gagetown (2010–2014))	2014
Liberal	Richard Losier	Dieppe	2023
Independent	Dominic Cardy (Note: Originally elected under the PC banner)	Fredericton West-Hanwell	2018

Abbreviations

- CNB - **Consensus NB Party**
- Green - **Green Party of New Brunswick**
- Liberal - **New Brunswick Liberal Association**
- Ltn. - **Libertarian Party of New Brunswick**
- NDP - **New Brunswick New Democratic Party**
- PANB - **People's Alliance of New Brunswick**
- PC - **Progressive Conservative Party of New Brunswick**
- SJP - **Social Justice Party of New Brunswick**

Legend

NOTE: Candidates' names are as registered with Elections New Brunswick
bold denotes party leader
† denotes an incumbent who is not running for re-election or was defeated in nomination contest
# denotes an incumbent seeking re-election in a new district

=== Northern ===
Electoral district	Candidates					Incumbent
Electoral district	PC	Liberal	Green	NDP	Libertarian	Incumbent
Restigouche West	Diane Cyr; 1,733	Gilles LePage; 3,993	Myriam Cormier; 380		Ronald Geraghty; 116	Gilles LePage
Restigouche East	Normand Pelletier; 2,271	Guy H. Arseneault; 3,590	Gilles Cormier; 389	Daisy Petersen; 501		Guy Arseneault; Campbellton-Dalhousie
Belle-Baie-Belledune	Louis Robichaud; 1,254	Marco LeBlanc; 5,053	Rachel Boudreau; 1,411	Tyler (Ty) Boulay; 293		Marco LeBlanc; Restigouche-Chaleur
Bathurst	Kim Chamberlain; 2,029	René Legacy; 3,357	Robert Kryszko; 325	Jeff Frenette; 212		René Legacy; Bathurst West-Beresford
Hautes-Terres-Nepisiguit	Jason Purdy; 1,454	Luc Robichaud; 4,675				**Susan Holt**; Bathurst East-Nepisiguit-Saint-Isidore
Caraquet	Jean Paul Lanteigne; 719	Isabelle Thériault; 6,002				Isabelle Thériault
Shippagan-Les-Îles	François Robichaud; 530	Eric Mallet; 5,021	Wilfred Roussel; 1,111			Eric Mallet; Shippagan-Lamèque-Miscou
Tracadie	Gertrude McLaughlin; 537	Keith Chiasson; 5,030	Serge Brideau; 3,829			Keith Chiasson; Tracadie-Sheila

=== Miramichi and Kent ===
Electoral district	Candidates					Incumbent
Electoral district	Progressive Conservative	Liberal	Green	PANB	Other	Incumbent
Miramichi Bay-Neguac	Rejean Savoie; 3,146	Sam Johnston; 4,219	Wayne Hitchcock; 711			Réjean Savoie
Miramichi East	Michelle Conroy; 3,633	Veronique Arsenault; 2,921	Josh Shaddick; 355	Tom L'Huillier; 236		Michelle Conroy; Miramichi
Miramichi West	Mike Dawson; 3,814	Mark Hambrook; 2,254	Genevieve MacRae; 273	Rhonda L'Huillier; 229	Richard Sutherland (Ind.); 112	Mike Dawson; Southwest Miramichi-Bay du Vin
Kent North	Carl Cosby; 1,441	Pat Finnigan; 3,928	Kevin Arseneau; 3,251	Carole Boudreau; 145		Kevin Arseneau
Beausoleil-Grand-Bouctouche-Kent	Ann Bastarache; 1,761	Benoît Bourque; 5,794	Bernadette Morin; 1,220		**Lenny O'Brien** (CNB); 112	Benoît Bourque; Kent South
Beausoleil-Grand-Bouctouche-Kent	Ann Bastarache; 1,761	Benoît Bourque; 5,794	Bernadette Morin; 1,220		Eddy Richard (Ltn.); 90	Benoît Bourque; Kent South

=== Southeastern ===
Electoral district	Candidates					Incumbent
Electoral district	Progressive Conservative	Liberal	Green	Libertarian	Other	Incumbent
Shediac Bay-Dieppe	René Ephestion; 1,803	Robert Gauvin; 6,530	Chantal Landry; 1,254			Robert Gauvin
Shediac-Cap-Acadie	Christine Arseneault; 1,322	Jacques LeBlanc; 5,438	Jean Bourgeois; 2,901			Jacques LeBlanc; Shediac-Beaubassin-Cap-Pelé
Tantramar	Bruce Phinney; 1,166	John Higham; 1,276	Megan Mitton; 2,468	Donna Allen; 57	Evelyne Godfrey (NDP); 84	Megan Mitton; Memramcook-Tantramar
Dieppe-Memramcook	Dean Léonard; 1,311	Natacha Vautour; 5,600	Jacques Giguère; 1,531			Richard Losier†; Dieppe
Moncton East	Paolo (PJ) Andreetti; 1,903	Alexandre Cédric Doucet; 4,449	Diani Blanco; 736		Alex Gagne (NDP); 329	Rob McKee‡ Moncton Centre
Moncton Centre	Dave Melanson; 1,738	Rob McKee; 3,501	Sarah Colwell; 711		James Ryan (NDP); 242	Sherry Wilson# Moncton Southwest
Moncton South	Greg Turner; 2,229	Claire Johnson; 3,559	Vincent Merola; 900			Greg Turner
Moncton Northwest	Ernie Steeves; 3,536	Tania Sodhi; 3,761	Ana Santana; 804			Ernie Steeves
Champdoré-Irishtown	Ricky Gautreau; 2,450	Lyne Chantal Boudreau; 3,732	Matthew Ian Clark; 743	Adam Hennessey; 103		Daniel Allain†; Moncton East
Riverview	Rob Weir; 3,114	Scott Grant; 2,740	Sarah Lord; 1,978	Rebecca Mallaley; 69	Desiree Despres (NDP); 128	Bruce Fitch†
Albert-Riverview	Sherry Wilson; 4,363	Dave Gouthro; 2,599	Liam MacDougall; 972	William Jones; 97	Sharon Buchanan (PANB); 297	Vacant; Albert
Arcadia-Butternut Valley-Maple Hills	Don Monahan; 4,284	Connie Larson; 2,289	Brian Boucher; 1,093	Anthony Matthews; 149		Ross Wetmore†; Gagetown-Petitcodiac

=== Southern ===
Electoral district	Candidates						Incumbent
Electoral district	Progressive Conservative	Liberal	Green	NDP	Libertarian	Other	Incumbent
Sussex-Three Rivers	Tammy Scott-Wallace; 3,789	Bruce Northrup; 3,282	Teri McMackin; 1,235		Wayne Wheeler; 159		Tammy Scott-Wallace; Sussex-Fundy-St. Martins
Hampton-Fundy-St. Martins	Faytene Grasseschi; 3,035	John Herron; 3,259	Laura Myers; 1,553	Gordie Stackhouse; 171	Barbara Dempsey; 120	Peter Graham (PANB); 153	Vacant; Hampton
Quispamsis	**Blaine Higgs**; 3,668	Aaron Kennedy; 3,861	Andrew Conradi; 378	**Alex White**; 360		David Raymond Amos (Ind.); 42	Blaine Higgs
Rothesay	Hugh J. (Ted) Flemming; 3,373	Alyson Townsend; 4,085	Zara MacKay-Boyce; 549		Austin Venedam; 85		Ted Flemming
Saint John East	Glen Savoie; 3,181	David Alston; 3,147	Gerald Irish; 514	Josh Floyd; 252	Denise Campbell; 92	Tanya Graham (PANB); 118	Glen Savoie
Saint John Portland-Simonds	Paul Dempsey; 2,497	John Dornan; 3,546	P.J. Duncan; 438	Bobby Martin (Note: Withdrew.); 162			Vacant; Portland-Simonds
Saint John Harbour	Adam Smith; 1,563	David Hickey; 3,413	Mariah Darling; 715	Kenneth Procter; 228	Shelley Craig; 82		Vacant
Saint John West-Lancaster	Kim Costain; 2,787	Kate Elman Wilcott; 3,525	Joanna Killen; 864	Jane Ryan; 330	Sherie Vukelic; 69		Dorothy Shephard†; Saint John Lancaster
Kings Centre	Bill Oliver; 3,821	Brian Stephenson; 2,557	Bruce Dryer; 1,136		Crystal Tays; 139		Bill Oliver
Fundy-The Isles-Saint John Lorneville	Ian Lee; 3,971	Patty Borthwick; 2,052	Rhonda Connell; 346	Chris Wanamaker; 158	**Keith Tays**; 88	Sharon Greenlaw (CNB); 113	Andrea Anderson-Mason†; Fundy-The Isles-Saint John West
Saint Croix	Kathy Bockus; 3,271	Troy Lyons; 2,063	Mark Groleau; 1,442	Bola Ademolu; 90	Krysten Mitchell; 82	Kris Booth (Ind.); 170	Kathy Bockus
Saint Croix	Kathy Bockus; 3,271	Troy Lyons; 2,063	Mark Groleau; 1,442	Bola Ademolu; 90	Krysten Mitchell; 82	Alex Tessmann (PANB); 96	Kathy Bockus

=== Capital Region ===
Electoral district	Candidates						Incumbent
Electoral district	Progressive Conservative	Liberal	Green	PANB	NDP	Libertarian	Incumbent
Oromocto-Sunbury	Mary E. Wilson; 4,381	Stephen Horsman; 2,725	Emerald Gibson; 868		Glenna Hanley; 341		Mary Wilson; Oromocto-Lincoln-Fredericton
Fredericton-Grand Lake	Kris Austin; 4,456	Kevin Dignam; 2,277	Ken Washburn; 862	**Rick DeSaulniers**; 461	Arthur Taylor; 195		Kris Austin
Fredericton-Lincoln	Daniel Chippin; 2,307	Joni Leger; 2,244	**David Coon**; 3,646				**David Coon**; Fredericton South
Fredericton South-Silverwood	Nicolle Carlin; 2,287	**Susan Holt**; 4,605	Simon Ouellette; 1,860		Nicki Lyons-MacFarlane; 165		Dominic Cardy†; Fredericton West-Hanwell
Fredericton North	Jill Green; 2,753	Luke Randall; 4,130	Anthea Plummer; 922	Glen Davis; 107	Matthew Stocek; 120	Andrew Vandette; 46	Jill Green
Fredericton-York	Ryan Cullins; 3,572	Tanya Whitney; 2,527	Pam Allen-LeBlanc; 1,673	Michael Broderick; 256	Steven J. LaForest; 133		Ryan Cullins
Hanwell-New Maryland	Judy Wilson-Shee; 3,948	Cindy Miles; 4,006	Susan Jonah; 1,051	Kris Hurtubise; 177	Joël Cyr LaPlante; 119	Meryl W. Sarty; 67	Jeff Carr†; New Maryland-Sunbury
Carleton-York	Richard Ames; 4,622	Chris Duffie; 2,136	Burt Folkins; 675	Sterling Wright; 415			Richard Ames

=== Upper River Valley ===
Electoral district	Candidates					Incumbent
Electoral district	Progressive Conservative	Liberal	Green	NDP	Other	Incumbent
Woodstock-Hartland	Bill Hogan; 4,199	Marisa Pelkey; 2,549	Jada Roche; 276	Bo Sheaves; 138	Ernest Culberson (Ind.); 209	Bill Hogan; Carleton
Woodstock-Hartland	Bill Hogan; 4,199	Marisa Pelkey; 2,549	Jada Roche; 276	Bo Sheaves; 138	Charlie Webber (PANB); 575	Bill Hogan; Carleton
Carleton-Victoria	Margaret Johnson; 4,798	Julian Moulton; 2,159	Rebecca Blaevoet; 451		Tasha Rossignol (SJP); 290	Margaret Johnson
Grand Falls-Vallée-des-Rivières-Saint-Quentin	Marc-André Ross; 2,493	Chuck Chiasson; 4,976	Dani McLean-Godbout; 540			Chuck Chiasson; Victoria-La Vallée
Edmundston-Vallée-des-Rivières	Roger Quimper; 1,049	Jean-Claude (JC) D'Amours; 5,573			Sylvain Gerald Voisine (SJP); 186	Jean-Claude D'Amours; Edmundston-Madawaska Centre
Madawaska Les Lacs-Edmundston	Michel Morin; 1,970	Francine Landry; 4,798	Alain Martel; 218	André Martin; 114	Richard Barahoga (CNB); 53	Francine Landry

== Results ==
Advance polling took place on October 12 and 15, 2024. On October 21, multiple news outlets projected a Liberal Majority government. The result was projected roughly 36 minutes after the polls closed. Susan Holt will become the first female premier in New Brunswick. Premier Blaine Higgs lost his own seat in the riding of Quispamsis. Five other cabinet ministers were also defeated.

Summary of the 2024 Legislative Assembly of New Brunswick election
Party	Leader	Candidates	Votes				Seats		
Party	Leader	Candidates	#	±	%	Change (pp)	2020	2024	±
Liberal	Susan Holt	49	180,806	51,781▲	48.24	13.89	17	31 / 49	14▲
Progressive Conservative	Blaine Higgs	49	131,332	16,458▼	35.04	-4.30	27	16 / 49	11▼
Green	David Coon	46	51,558	5,694▼	13.76	-1.48	3	2 / 49	1▼
New Democratic	Alex White	23	4,703	1,517▼	1.30	-0.36			
People's Alliance	Rick DeSaulniers	13	3,265	31,261▼	0.87	-8.32	2	0 / 49	2▼
Libertarian	Keith Tays	18	1,710	1,710▲	0.46	New			
Independent		4	533	152▼	0.14	-0.04			
Social Justice	Tanya Roberts	2	476	476▲	0.13	New			
Consensus NB	Len O'Brien	3	278	278▲	0.07	New			
Total		207	374,661		100.00%				
Rejected ballots			1,393	127▲					
Turnout			376,054	849▼	64.82%	1.32▼			
Registered voters			580,145	10,283▲					

=== Synopsis of results ===
2024 New Brunswick general election - synopsis of riding results
Riding	Winning party							Turnout (Note: Includes rejected ballots)	Votes (Note: Parties receiving more than 1% of the popular vote in either 2024 or 2020 are listed separately.)							
Riding	2020	1st place	Votes	Share	Margin #	Margin %	2nd place	Turnout	Lib	PC	Green	NDP	PA	Ind	Other	Total
Albert-Riverview	New	PC	4,363	52.39%	1,764	21.18%	Lib	64.30%	2,599	4,363	972	–	297	–	97	8,328
Arcadia-Butternut Valley-Maple Hills	PC	PC	4,284	54.82%	1,995	25.53%	Lib	67.27%	2,289	4,284	1,093	–	–	–	149	7,815
Bathurst	New	Lib	3,357	56.68%	1,328	22.42%	PC	60.41%	3,357	2,029	325	212	–	–	–	5,923
Beausoleil-Grand-Bouctouche-Kent	Lib	Lib	5,794	64.54%	4,033	44.93%	PC	69.86%	5,794	1,761	1,220	–	–	–	202	8,977
Belle-Baie-Belledune	New	Lib	5,053	63.08%	3,642	45.46%	Green	64.21%	5,053	1,254	1,411	293	–	–	–	8,011
Caraquet	Lib	Lib	6,002	89.30%	5,283	78.60%	PC	69.03%	6,002	719	–	–	–	–	–	6,721
Carleton-Victoria	PC	PC	4,798	62.33%	2,639	34.28%	Lib	59.96%	2,159	4,798	451	–	–	–	290	7,698
Carleton-York	PC	PC	4,622	58.89%	2,486	31.68%	Lib	68.24%	2,136	4,622	675	–	415	–	–	7,848
Champdoré-Irishtown	New	Lib	3,732	53.10%	1,282	18.24%	PC	68.64%	3,732	2,450	743	–	–	–	103	7,028
Dieppe-Memramcook	New	Lib	5,600	66.33%	4,069	48.20%	Green	70.24%	5,600	1,311	1,531	–	–	–	–	8,442
Edmundston-Vallée-des-Rivières	Lib	Lib	5,573	81.86%	4,524	66.45%	PC	63.43%	5,573	1,049	–	–	–	–	186	6,808
Fredericton-Lincoln	New	Green	3,646	44.48%	1,339	16.34%	PC	69.61%	2,244	2,307	3,646	–	–	–	–	8,197
Fredericton North	PC	Lib	4,130	51.13%	1,377	17.05%	PC	66.79%	4,130	2,753	922	120	107	–	46	8,078
Fredericton South-Silverwood	New	Lib	4,605	51.64%	2,318	26.00%	PC	71.31%	4,605	2,287	1,860	165	–	–	–	8,917
Fredericton-Grand Lake	PA	PC	4,456	54.01%	2,179	26.41%	Lib	67.05%	2,277	4,456	862	195	461	–	–	8,251
Fredericton-York	PC	PC	3,572	43.77%	1,045	12.80%	Lib	69.93%	2,527	3,572	1,673	133	256	–	–	8,161
Fundy-The Isles-Saint John Lorneville	PC	PC	3,971	59.02%	1,919	28.52%	Lib	65.27%	2,052	3,971	346	158	–	–	201	6,728
Grand Falls-Vallée-des-Rivières-Saint-Quentin	Lib	Lib	4,976	62.13%	2,483	31.00%	PC	62.35%	4,976	2,493	540	–	–	–	–	8,009
Hampton-Fundy-St. Martins	PC	Lib	3,259	39.31%	224	2.70%	PC	72.99%	3,259	3,035	1,553	171	153	–	120	8,291
Hanwell-New Maryland	New	Lib	4,006	42.76%	58	0.62%	PC	74.97%	4,006	3,948	1,051	119	177	–	67	9,368
Hautes-Terres-Nepisiguit	New	Lib	4,675	76.28%	3,221	52.55%	PC	63.65%	4,675	1,454	–	–	–	–	–	6,129
Kent North	Green	Lib	3,928	44.81%	677	7.72%	Green	67.99%	3,928	1,441	3,251	–	145	–	–	8,765
Kings Centre	PC	PC	3,821	49.93%	1,264	16.52%	Lib	66.50%	2,557	3,821	1,136	–	–	–	139	7,653
Madawaska Les Lacs-Edmundston	Lib	Lib	4,798	67.08%	2,828	39.54%	PC	64.96%	4,798	1,970	218	114	–	–	53	7,153
Miramichi Bay-Neguac	Lib	Lib	4,219	52.24%	1,073	13.29%	PC	65.39%	4,219	3,146	711	–	–	–	–	8,076
Miramichi East	New	PC	3,633	50.85%	712	9.97%	Lib	71.13%	2,921	3,633	355	–	236	–	–	7,145
Miramichi West	New	PC	3,814	57.08%	1,560	23.35%	Lib	67.80%	2,254	3,814	273	–	229	112	–	6,682
Moncton Centre	Lib	Lib	3,501	56.54%	1,763	28.47%	PC	57.02%	3,501	1,738	711	242	–	–	–	6,192
Moncton East	PC	Lib	4,449	59.98%	2,546	34.33%	PC	60.31%	4,449	1,903	736	329	–	–	–	7,417
Moncton Northwest	PC	Lib	3,761	46.43%	225	2.78%	PC	65.77%	3,761	3,536	804	–	–	–	–	8,101
Moncton South	PC	Lib	3,559	53.21%	1,330	19.89%	PC	59.13%	3,559	2,229	900	–	–	–	–	6,688
Oromocto-Sunbury	New	PC	4,381	52.69%	1,656	19.92%	Lib	63.05%	2,725	4,381	868	341	–	–	–	8,315
Quispamsis	PC	Lib	3,861	46.47%	193	2.32%	PC	74.26%	3,861	3,668	378	360	–	42	–	8,309
Restigouche East	New	Lib	3,590	53.18%	1,319	19.54%	PC	68.87%	3,590	2,271	389	501	–	–	–	6,751
Restigouche West	Lib	Lib	3,993	64.18%	2,260	36.32%	PC	62.56%	3,993	1,733	380	–	–	–	116	6,222
Riverview	PC	PC	3,114	38.78%	374	4.66%	Lib	66.99%	2,740	3,114	1,978	128	–	–	69	8,029
Rothesay	PC	Lib	4,085	50.48%	712	8.80%	PC	72.82%	4,085	3,373	549	–	–	–	85	8,092
Saint Croix	PC	PC	3,271	45.34%	1,208	16.75%	Lib	62.32%	2,063	3,271	1,442	90	96	170	82	7,214
Saint John East	PC	PC	3,181	43.55%	34	0.47%	Lib	60.39%	3,147	3,181	514	252	118	–	92	7,304
Saint John Harbour	PC	Lib	3,413	56.87%	1,850	30.83%	PC	50.52%	3,413	1,563	715	228	–	–	82	6,001
Saint John Portland-Simonds	PC	Lib	3,546	53.38%	1,049	15.79%	PC	56.12%	3,546	2,497	438	162	–	–	–	6,643
Saint John West-Lancaster	PC	Lib	3,525	46.53%	738	9.74%	PC	66.89%	3,525	2,787	864	330	–	–	69	7,575
Shediac Bay-Dieppe	Lib	Lib	6,530	68.11%	4,727	49.31%	PC	69.61%	6,530	1,803	1,254	–	–	–	–	9,587
Shediac-Cap-Acadie	Lib	Lib	5,438	56.29%	2,537	26.26%	Green	70.20%	5,438	1,322	2,901	–	–	–	–	9,661
Shippagan-Les-Îles	Lib	Lib	5,021	75.37%	3,910	58.69%	Green	68.75%	5,021	530	1,111	–	–	–	–	6,662
Sussex-Three Rivers	PC	PC	3,789	44.76%	507	5.99%	Lib	66.13%	3,282	3,789	1,235	–	–	–	159	8,465
Tantramar	New	Green	2,468	48.86%	1,192	23.60%	Lib	61.53%	1,276	1,166	2,468	84	–	–	57	5,051
Tracadie	New	Lib	5,030	53.53%	1,201	12.78%	Green	74.70%	5,030	537	3,829	–	–	–	–	9,396
Woodstock-Hartland	PC	PC	4,199	52.84%	1,650	20.77%	Lib	65.56%	2,549	4,199	276	138	575	209	–	7,946

= Francophone-majority constituency
= Open seat
= Turnout is above provincial average
= Winning candidate was in previous Legislature
= Incumbent had switched allegiance
= Previously incumbent in another riding
= Not incumbent; was previously elected to the Legislature
= Incumbency arose from byelection gain
= Other incumbents renominated
= Previously an MP in the House of Commons of Canada
= Multiple candidates

=== Comparative analysis for ridings (2024 vs 2020) ===
==== Analytical charts ====
Ternary plots of election results
2020

2024
Electoral districts won identified by PC (blue), Liberal (red) Green (green) and PANB (light purple).

==== Winning shares and swings ====
Summary of riding results by vote share for winning candidate and swing (vs 2020) (Note: Derived from "Provincial Election Results". electionsnb.ca. Elections New Brunswick. February 5, 2014.)
Riding and winning party			Vote share (Note: Share won by winning candidate, with difference noted from share achieved by the same party in 2020.)		Swing (Note: Positive indicates improvement to standing of party winning in 2020; negative points to 2020's second-place party being swung to.)	
Riding and winning party			%	Change (pp)	To	Change (pp)
Albert-Riverview	PC	New	52.39	New		
Arcadia-Butternut Valley-Maple Hills	PC	Hold	54.82	-4.28	N/A (Note: People's Alliance came in 2nd in 2020, but did not field a candidate in 2024.)	
Bathurst	Lib	New	56.68	New		
Beausoleil-Grand-Bouctouche-Kent	Lib	Hold	64.54	9.32	Lib	9.96
Belle-Baie-Belledune	Lib	New	63.08	New		
Caraquet	Lib	Hold	89.30	17.04	N/A (Note: Greens came in 2nd in 2020, but did not field a candidate in 2024.)	
Carleton-Victoria	PC	Hold	62.33	17.11	PC	14.49
Carleton-York	PC	Hold	58.89	1.07	PC	7.17
Champdoré-Irishtown	Lib	New	53.10	New		
Dieppe-Memramcook	Lib	New	66.33	New		
Edmundston-Vallée-des-Rivières	Lib	Hold	81.86	7.39	Lib	5.80
Fredericton-Lincoln	Green	New	44.48	New		
Fredericton North	Lib	Gain	51.13	32.47	PC	6.47
Fredericton South-Silverwood	Lib	New	51.64	New		
Fredericton-Grand Lake	PC	Gain	54.01	23.39	PC	-32.11
Fredericton-York	PC	Hold	43.77	1.36	PC	2.42
Fundy-The Isles-Saint John Lorneville	PC	Hold	59.02	-7.45	Lib	-13.88
Grand Falls-Vallée-des-Rivières-Saint-Quentin	Lib	Hold	62.13	1.89	PC	-0.33
Hampton-Fundy-St. Martins	Lib	Gain	39.31	24.23	Lib	-24.07
Hanwell-New Maryland	Lib	New	42.76	New		
Hautes-Terres-Nepisiguit	Lib	New	76.28	New		
Kent North	Lib	Gain	44.81	10.19	Lib	-10.28
Kings Centre	PC	Hold	49.93	-11.61	Green	-6.47
Madawaska Les Lacs-Edmundston	Lib	Hold	67.08	0.54	PC	-0.70
Miramichi Bay-Neguac	Lib	Hold	52.24	8.68	Lib	1.69
Miramichi East	PC	New	50.85	New		
Miramichi West	PC	New	57.08	New		
Moncton Centre	Lib	Hold	56.54	17.63	Lib	16.78
Moncton East	Lib	Gain	59.98	24.63	Lib	-22.07
Moncton Northwest	Lib	Gain	46.43	15.76	Lib	-11.80
Moncton South	Lib	Gain	53.21	22.95	Lib	-15.85
Oromocto-Sunbury	PC	New	52.69	New		
Quispamsis	Lib	Gain	46.47	31.82	Lib	-27.89
Restigouche East	Lib	New	53.18	New		
Restigouche West	Lib	Hold	64.18	2.02	Lib	8.82
Riverview	PC	Hold	38.78	-21.29	Lib	-19.51
Rothesay	Lib	Gain	50.48	29.46	Lib	-24.53
Saint Croix	PC	Hold	45.34	0.16	PC	15.53
Saint John East	PC	Hold	43.55	-12.81	Lib	-14.78
Saint John Harbour	Lib	Gain	56.87	33.96	Green	-2.02
Saint John Portland-Simonds	Lib	Gain	53.38	24.63	Lib	-21.07
Saint John West-Lancaster	Lib	Gain	46.53	24.12	Lib	-20.78
Shediac Bay-Dieppe	Lib	Hold	68.11	7.97	Lib	9.88
Shediac-Cap-Acadie	Lib	Hold	56.29	2.62	Green	-0.40
Shippagan-Les-Îles	Lib	Hold	75.37	-8.41	PC	-3.81
Sussex-Three Rivers	PC	Hold	44.76	-11.53	N/A	
Tantramar	Green	New	48.86	New		
Tracadie	Lib	New	53.53	New		
Woodstock-Hartland	PC	Hold	52.84	4.97	PC	11.79
