= Beausoleil-Grand-Bouctouche-Kent =

Provincial electoral district in New Brunswick, Canada

New Brunswick electoral district
- The riding of Beausoleil-Grand-Bouctouche-Kent (as it exists from 2023) in relation to other New Brunswick electoral districts

Provincial electoral district
- Legislature: Legislative Assembly of New Brunswick
MLA
Benoît Bourque
Liberal
- District created: 2023
- First contested: 2024

Beausoleil-Grand-Bouctouche-Kent is a provincial electoral district for the Legislative Assembly of New Brunswick, Canada. It is the successor to Kent South, while also taking northern parts of Shediac Bay-Dieppe and southern portions of Kent North.

== History ==
It was created in 2023 and was first contested in the 2024 New Brunswick general election. The riding covers the municipalities of Grand-Bouctouche and Beausoleil, while also including large southern portions of both Five Rivers and the Kent Rural District.

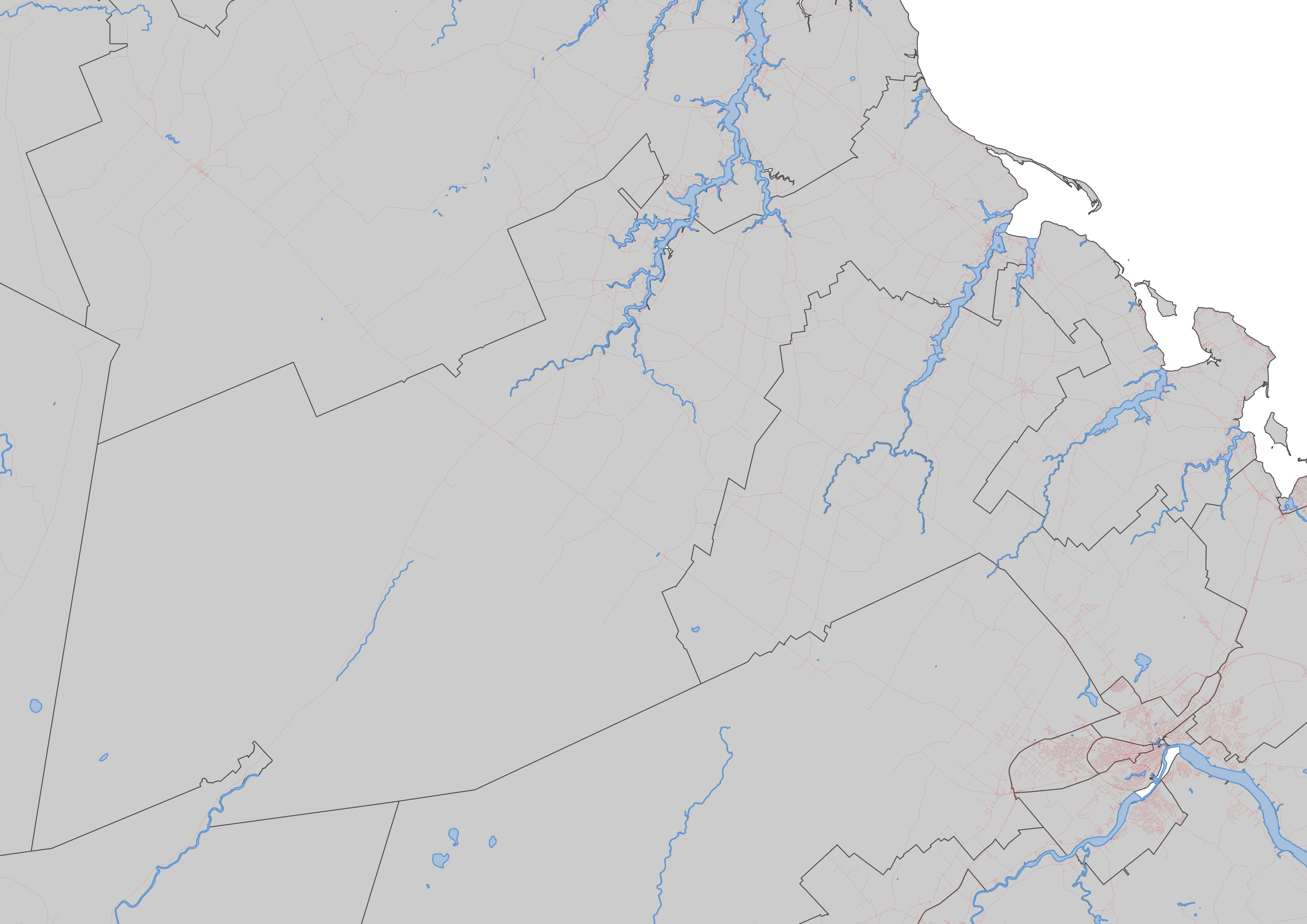
Beausoleil-Grand-Bouctouche-Kent (as it exists from 2023) and the roads in the riding

== Election results ==
2024 New Brunswick general election
Party	Candidate	Votes	%	±%
Liberal	Benoît Bourque	5,794	64.56	+8.76
Progressive Conservative	Ann Bastarache	1,759	19.60	-10.2
Green	Bernadette Morin	1,220	13.59	+4.09
Consensus NB	Lenny O'Brien	112	1.25	
Libertarian	Eddy Richard	90	1.00	
Total votes		8,975	100.0	
Liberal hold		Swing		

2020 provincial election redistributed results
Party	%
Liberal	55.8
Progressive Conservative	29.8
Green	9.5
People's Alliance	2.6
New Democratic Party	2.2

== See also ==
- List of New Brunswick provincial electoral districts
- Canadian provincial electoral districts
