= Prince Edward Island Reproductive Rights Organization =

The Prince Edward Island Reproductive Rights Organization (PRRO) is a special interest group advocating to have abortions performed in Prince Edward Island (PEI). To date, PEI is the only Canadian province that does not perform surgical abortions on its own soil. Abortions are provided by the PEI health care system at a nearby Halifax medical center. PRRO was founded by students of a local college.

PRRO became active in November 2011, when they held a public education rally outside of the provincial legislature. PRRO held a second rally on October 20, 2012, and were joined by other pro-choice groups across the country who were demanding abortion access on Prince Edward Island as their primary objective.

== Background ==
After abortion was decriminalized in Canada in 1988, almost all of the provinces began funding abortion per the Health Act. As of 2012 the only provinces to restrict payment for abortions are PEI and New Brunswick, which pay only for hospital abortions, not those performed in private clinics. In 2024 the newly-elected Holt government of New Brunswick repealed this ban to permit funding abortions outside hospitals, leaving PEI with the only such ban still in place.

== Mandate ==
PRRO's principal objective is to bring abortions to PEI soil. The group has not objected to the other health services provided by PEI's health care system in neighboring provinces. To date, the group has not spoken out about cancer treatment or children's health services, which are also carried out in neighboring provinces.
