= List of New Brunswick provincial electoral districts =

A map of the New Brunswick provincial electoral districts

This is a list of the 49 electoral districts used for elections to the Legislative Assembly of New Brunswick, in Canada.

== Electoral district breakdown (riding by riding) ==
=== Capital ===
1. Carleton-York
2. Fredericton Lincoln
3. Fredericton North
4. Fredericton South-Silverwood
5. Fredericton-Grand Lake
6. Fredericton-York
7. Hanwell-New Maryland
8. Oromocto-Sunbury

=== Northern ===
1. Bathurst
2. Belle-Baie-Belledune
3. Caraquet
4. Hautes-Terres-Nepisiguit
5. Miramichi Bay-Neguac
6. Miramichi East
7. Miramichi West
8. Restigouche West
9. Restigouche East
10. Shippagan-Les-Îles
11. Tracadie

=== River Valley ===
1. Carleton-Victoria
2. Edmundston-Vallée-des-Rivières
3. Grand Falls-Saint-Quentin
4. Madawaska-Les Lacs-Edmunston
5. Woodstock-Hartland

=== South ===
1. Fundy-The Isles-Saint John-Lorneville
2. Hampton-Fundy-St. Martins
3. Kings Centre
4. Quispamsis
5. Rothesay
6. Saint Croix
7. Saint John East
8. Saint John Harbour
9. Saint John Portland-Simonds
10. Saint John West-Lancaster

=== Southeast ===
1. Albert-Riverview
2. Arcadia-Butternut Valley-Maple Hills
3. Beausoleil-Grand-Bouctouche-Kent
4. Champdoré-Irishtown
5. Dieppe-Memramcook
6. Kent North
7. Moncton Centre
8. Moncton East
9. Moncton Northwest
10. Moncton South
11. Riverview
12. Shediac Bay-Dieppe
13. Shediac-Cap-Acadie
14. Sussex-Three Rivers
15. Tantramar

== See also ==
- Canadian provincial electoral districts
- List of post-Confederation New Brunswick general elections
- 2024 New Brunswick general election
