= Treasury Board (disambiguation) =

Treasury Board may refer to:

- Treasury Board of Canada
- Treasury Board of Canada Secretariat
- President of the Treasury Board (of Canada)
- Treasury Board Secretariat (Ontario)
- Treasury Board (New Brunswick)
