= Luc Robichaud =

Canadian politician

Member of the New Brunswick Legislative Assembly for Hautes-Terres-Nepisiguit
- Incumbent
- Assumed office October 21, 2024
- Preceded by: new district

Personal details
- Party: Liberal

Luc Robichaud is a Canadian politician, who was elected to the Legislative Assembly of New Brunswick in the 2024 election. He was elected in the riding of Hautes-Terres-Nepisiguit.

Robichaud was born in Paquetville in 1981. He was the mayor of Paquetville from 2016 to 2022, and served on the municipal council of Hautes-Terres after that.

== Electoral record ==
2024 New Brunswick general election: Hautes-Terres-Nepisiguit
Party	Candidate	Votes	%	±%
Liberal	Luc Robichaud	4,675	76.3%	+7.5
Progressive Conservative	Jason Purdy	1,454	23.7%	+4.8
Total valid votes		6,129		
Total rejected ballots				
Turnout				
Eligible voters				
Source: Elections New Brunswick
