= Roger Melanson =

Canadian politician

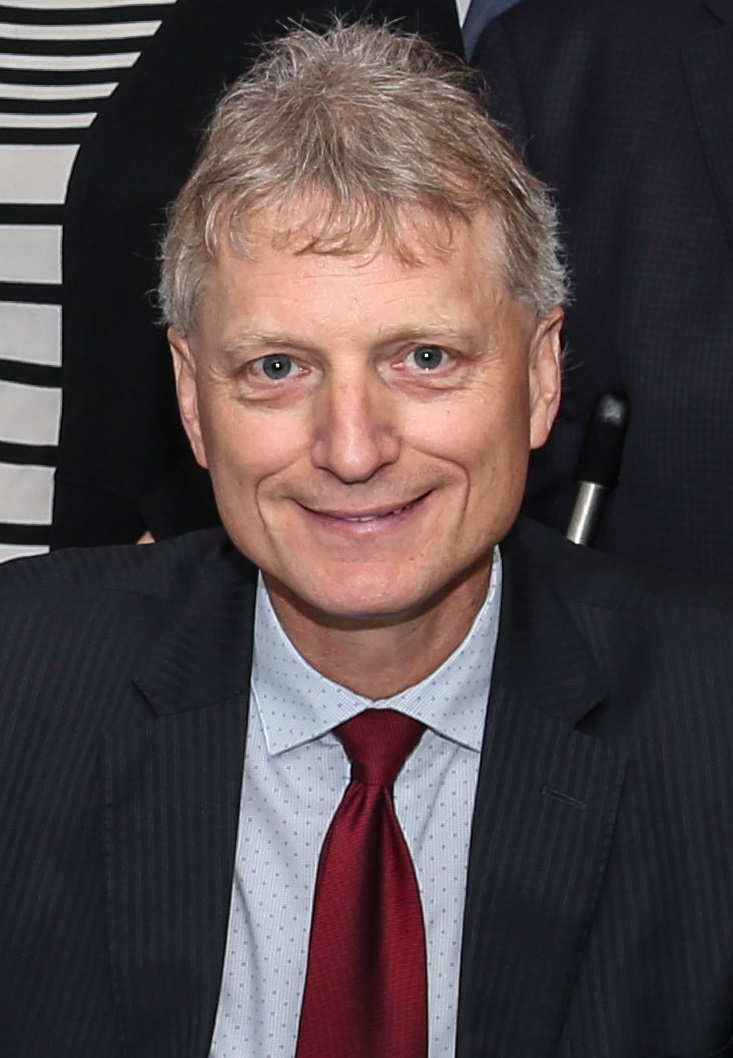
- Melanson in 2017

Leader of the Opposition of New Brunswick
- In office September 28, 2020 – September 21, 2022
- Preceded by: Denis Landry
- Succeeded by: Rob McKee

Interim leader of the New Brunswick Liberal Association
- In office September 14, 2020 – August 6, 2022
- Preceded by: Kevin Vickers
- Succeeded by: Susan Holt

Minister of Energy and Resource Development
- In office October 5, 2018 – November 9, 2018
- Premier: Brian Gallant
- Preceded by: Rick Doucet
- Succeeded by: Mike Holland

Minister of Post-Secondary Education
- In office September 5, 2017 – November 9, 2018
- Premier: Brian Gallant
- Preceded by: Donald Arseneault (Post-Secondary Education, Training, and Labour)
- Succeeded by: Trevor Holder (Post-Secondary Education, Training, and Labour)

President of the Treasury Board
- In office October 7, 2014 – November 9, 2018
- Premier: Brian Gallant
- Preceded by: Blaine Higgs
- Succeeded by: Ernie Steeves

Minister of Finance
- In office October 7, 2014 – June 6, 2016
- Premier: Brian Gallant
- Preceded by: Blaine Higgs
- Succeeded by: Cathy Rogers

Minister of Transportation and Infrastructure
- In office October 7, 2014 – June 6, 2016
- Premier: Brian Gallant
- Preceded by: Claude Williams
- Succeeded by: Bill Fraser

Member of the New Brunswick Legislative Assembly for Dieppe
- In office September 27, 2010 – October 21, 2022
- Preceded by: Cy LeBlanc
- Succeeded by: Richard Losier

Personal details
- Party: Liberal

Roger Melanson is a former Canadian politician who was elected to the Legislative Assembly of New Brunswick in the 2010 provincial election, and Leader of the Opposition. He represented the electoral district of Dieppe as a member of the Liberals.

He is a graduate of the Université de Moncton with a bachelor’s degree in Social Sciences and a Master’s Degree in Public Administration. He served as general manager of the Economic Development Corporation of the City of Dieppe, New Brunswick and as a business executive. He and his wife Lise Babin have two children.

On October 7, 2014, Melanson was appointed to the Executive Council of New Brunswick as Minister of Finance, and Minister of Transportation and Infrastructure.

On September 6, 2017, in a cabinet shuffle, Melanson was named Minister of Treasury Board and Post-Secondary Education. From October 5, 2018 to November 9, 2018, Melanson served as Minister of Energy and Resource Development. He was re-elected in the 2020 provincial election.

On September 28, 2020, he was chosen as interim leader of the opposition Liberal party of New Brunswick, replacing Kevin Vickers who had resigned following the provincial election of September 14.

He remained interim leader until August 2022, when Susan Holt won a party leadership election in which Melanson was not a candidate.

On October 13, 2022, Melanson announced that he would be departing from provincial politics after 12 years, on October 21, 2022.

Preceded by Burt Paulin	Chair of the Liberal caucus 2010–2022	Rob McKee
