= Oromocto-Sunbury =

Provincial electoral district in New Brunswick, Canada

New Brunswick electoral district

Provincial electoral district
- Legislature: Legislative Assembly of New Brunswick
MLA
Mary Wilson
Progressive Conservative
- District created: 2023
- First contested: 2024

Oromocto-Sunbury is a provincial electoral district for the Legislative Assembly of New Brunswick, Canada. It was created largely out of Oromocto-Lincoln-Fredericton, while also including eastern portions of New Maryland-Sunbury, and a part of Fundy-The Isles-Saint John West.

== District created ==
The district was created in 2023 and was first contested in the 2024 New Brunswick general election. It covers the municipalities of Oromocto with the eastern half of Sunbury-York South, southeastern areas in the Capital Region Rural District, and northwestern parts of the Fundy Rural District. The riding also holds the Oromocto First Nation.

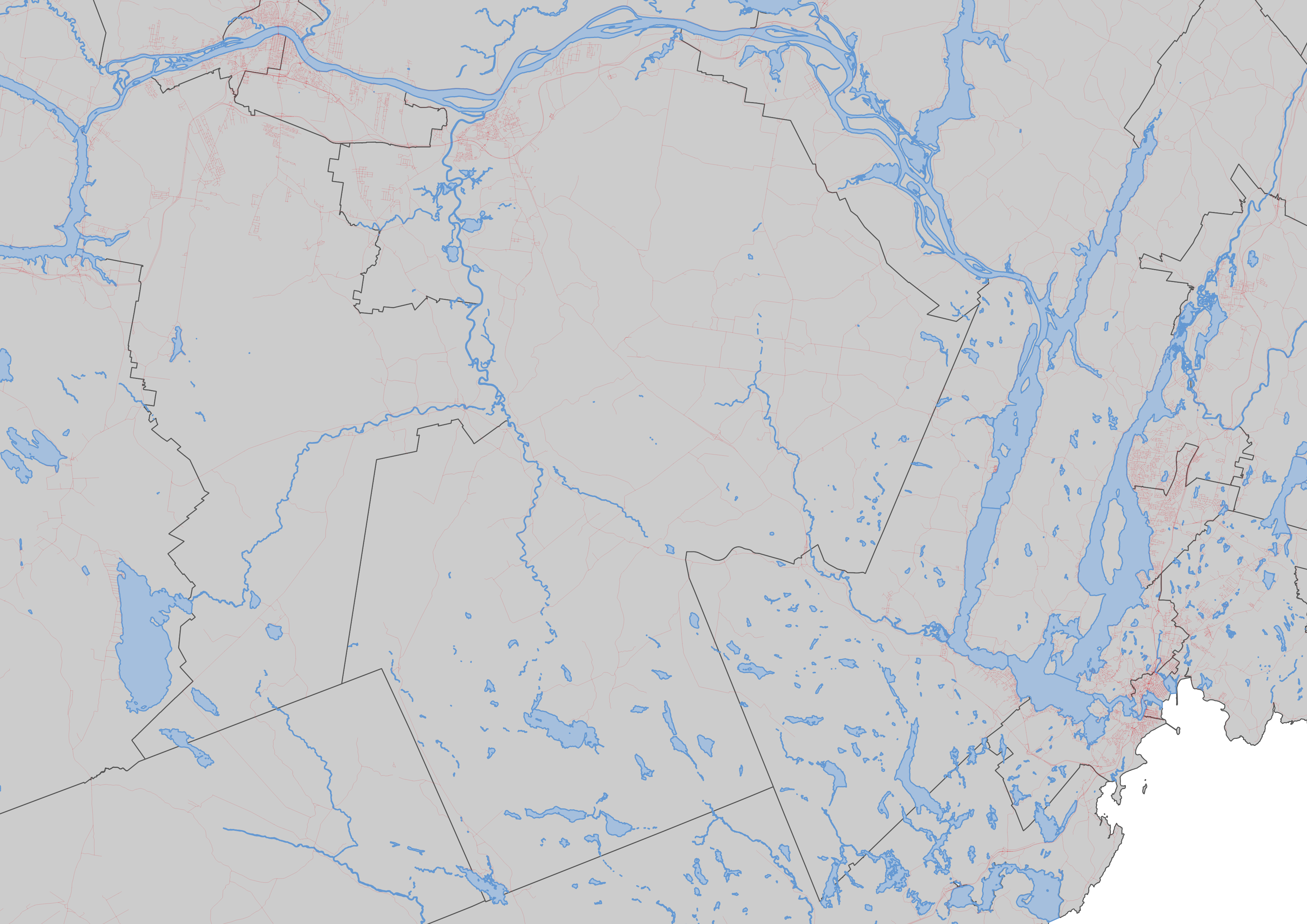
Oromocto-Sunbury (as it exists from 2023) and the roads in the riding

== Election results ==
2024 New Brunswick general election
| Party | Candidate | Votes | % | ±% |
|---|---|---|---|---|
| Progressive Conservative | Mary Wilson | 4,381 | 52.7% | -3.4 |
| Liberal | Stephen Horsman | 2,725 | 32.8% | +18.3 |
| Green | Emerald Gibson | 868 | 10.4% | -3.0 |
| New Democratic | Glenna Hanley | 341 | 4.1% | +2.4 |
| Total valid votes | | 8,315 | | |
| Total rejected ballots | | | | |
| Turnout | | | | |
| Eligible voters | | | | |
| Progressive Conservative hold | | Swing | | |
Source: Elections New Brunswick

2020 provincial election redistributed results
| Party | % |
|---|---|
| Progressive Conservative | 56.1 |
| Liberal | 14.5 |
| People's Alliance | 14.2 |
| Green | 13.4 |
| New Democratic | 1.7 |

== See also ==
- List of New Brunswick provincial electoral districts
- Canadian provincial electoral districts
