= Susan Holt =

Premier of New Brunswick since 2024

The Honourable Susan Holt MLA
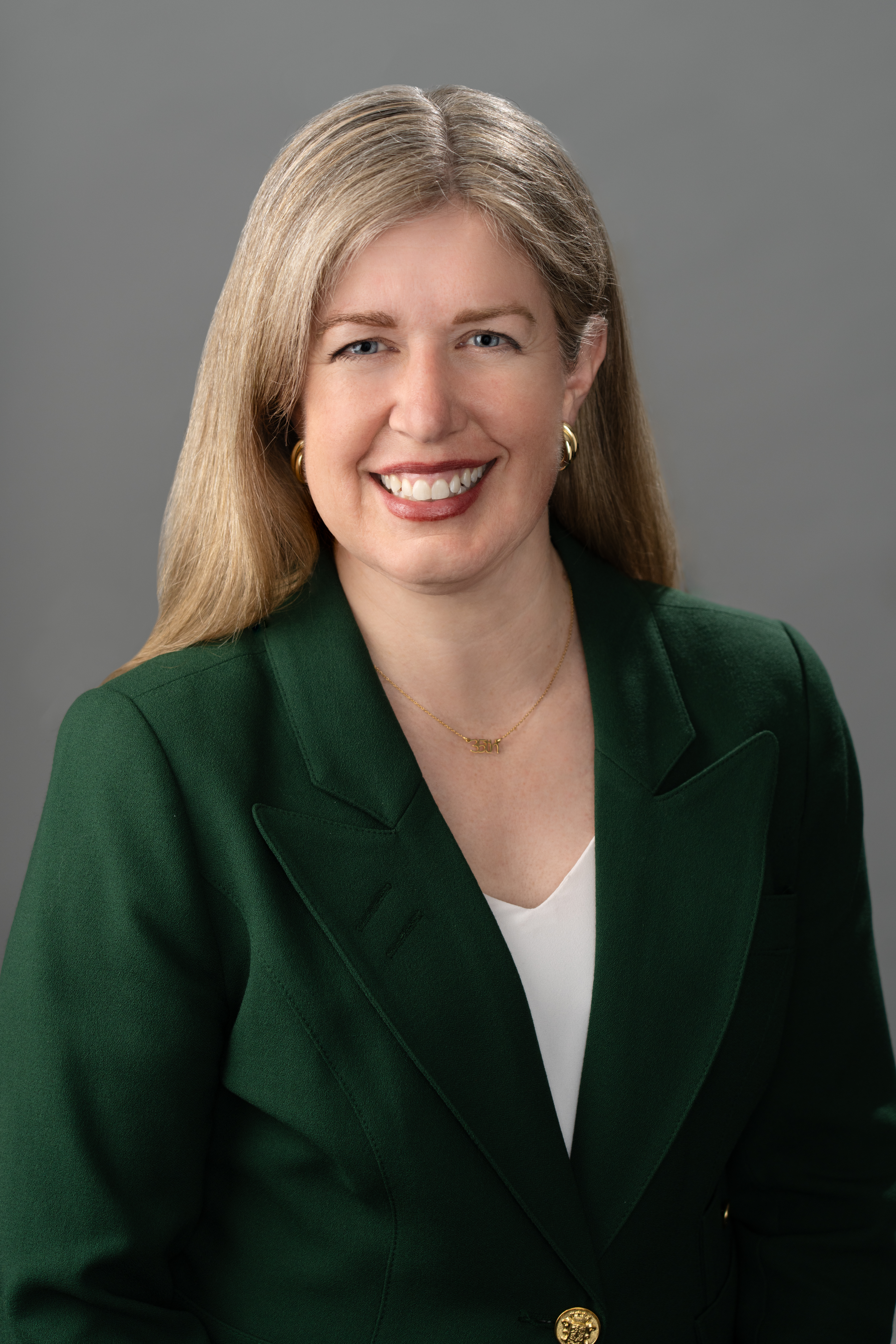
- Holt in 2025

35th Premier of New Brunswick
- Incumbent
- Assumed office November 2, 2024
- Monarch: Charles III
- Lieutenant Governor: Brenda Murphy; Louise Imbeault
- Deputy: René Legacy
- Preceded by: Blaine Higgs

Leader of the New Brunswick Liberal Association
- Incumbent
- Assumed office August 6, 2022
- Preceded by: Roger Melanson (interim)

Leader of the Opposition of New Brunswick
- In office May 9, 2023 – November 19, 2024
- Preceded by: Rob McKee
- Succeeded by: Glen Savoie

Member of the Legislative Assembly of New Brunswick
- Incumbent
- Assumed office October 21, 2024
- Preceded by: Riding established
- Constituency: Fredericton South-Silverwood
- In office April 24, 2023 – September 19, 2024
- Preceded by: Denis Landry
- Succeeded by: Riding abolished
- Constituency: Bathurst East-Nepisiguit-Saint-Isidore

Personal details
- Born: Susan Henry; April 22, 1977 (age 49) Fredericton, New Brunswick, Canada
- Party: Liberal
- Spouse: Jon Holt
- Children: 3
- Education: Queen's University

Susan Holt (born April 22, 1977) is a Canadian politician and businesswoman, who has served as the 35th premier of New Brunswick since November 2, 2024, and has been the leader of the New Brunswick Liberal Association since August 6, 2022. She has served as the MLA for Fredericton South-Silverwood since 2024. Previously, she was the MLA for Bathurst East-Nepisiguit-Saint-Isidore and as the leader of the Opposition from 2023 to 2024. She is the first woman to become premier of New Brunswick.

== Early life and career ==
Susan Holt was born on April 22, 1977 in Fredericton, New Brunswick. She grew up in Fredericton where she attended French immersion school and became fluently bilingual in English and French. She attended Queen's University in Kingston, Ontario, where she graduated with a degree in chemistry in 1999 and one in economics in 2000.

Prior to entering politics, Holt worked in Fredericton, where she served as chief growth officer for software testing companies PLATO Testing and PQA, and served as president and CEO of the New Brunswick Business Council. In 2015, Holt was appointed by Premier Brian Gallant to serve as chief of business relationships on the New Brunswick Jobs Board secretariat, and simultaneously served as senior economic development advisor to Gallant. Holt ran as the Liberal candidate in Fredericton South in the 2018 New Brunswick general election, losing to New Brunswick Green Party leader David Coon.

== Political career ==
Holt was elected leader of the New Brunswick Liberal Association during the August 6, 2022 leadership election on the third ballot, defeating three candidates. As Holt was not a sitting member of the Legislative Assembly of New Brunswick upon becoming leader of the Liberal Party, Liberal MLA Denis Landry offered in August 2022 to resign his seat so that Holt could run in a by-election. In November 2022, Holt announced that she would accept his offer and run in Landry's riding of Bathurst East-Nepisiguit-Saint-Isidore. Landry then confirmed that he was resigning the seat. On April 24, 2023, Holt won a by-election in Bathurst East-Nepisiguit-Saint-Isidore to win a seat in the Legislative Assembly. On May 9, 2023, she became the official opposition leader in New Brunswick.

=== Premier (2024–present) ===
The Liberals won 31 seats in the 2024 general election, making Holt the premier-designate to succeed Blaine Higgs of the Progressive Conservative Party. Holt was elected MLA for Fredericton South-Silverwood, a newly created riding partly overlapping the former Fredericton South where she had run in 2018. She was sworn in along with her cabinet on November 2.

On November 7, 2024, Holt and her government approved changes to Regulation 84-20, repealing a 1984 rule which restricted Medicare funding for surgical abortions performed outside of hospitals.

In March 2025, the Holt government tabled its first budget. Amid proposed U.S. tariffs under the second Trump administration, Holt held briefings in March and April 2025 to outline the province's response strategy defending a "cooler heads" approach that avoided using electricity exports to Maine as leverage. In 2025, she signed agreements with other provinces to reduce interprovincial trade barriers in the midst of the United States trade war with Canada.

During the 2025 New Brunswick wildfires, which peaked in August with blazes in areas like Irishtown and Miramichi considered out of control, Holt's government restricted access to Crown land to mitigate risks. Holt held multiple news conferences to provide updates, thanking firefighters and emphasizing mental health support for affected residents amid evacuations and smoke concerns. Opposition MLAs called for more investigations into the wildfires' causes, with some criticizing slow pace of information being released.

In early 2026, the Holt government 2026 budget recorded a $1.3 billion deficit, the largest in provincial history. As a result, the Holt government directed all departments to find 10-15% savings for the 2026-27 budget. One of these departments, the Department of Post-Secondary Education, Training and Labour, received significant attention due to the propositions made to cut its budget which included merging St. Thomas University into the University of New Brunswick and privatizing Mount Allison University. Holt reversed course on the St. Thomas closure a few days later. As a result of the deficit, the provincial government also initiated plans for installing highway tolls on the Trans Canada Highway in Aulac by 2028, similar to those in Nova Scotia and on the Confederation Bridge; non-New Brunswickers would pay a fee to pass. Those who expressed disagreement with the plan included Green MLA Megan Mitton and prime minister Mark Carney, stating that the federal government is attempting to "reduce internal trade barriers".

== Personal life ==
Holt lives with her family in Fredericton. She is married to Jon Holt, and they have three children.

== Electoral record ==
=== Fredericton South-Silverwood ===
2024 New Brunswick general election: Fredericton South-Silverwood
Party	Candidate	Votes	%	±%
Liberal	Susan Holt	4,605	51.64	+37.5
Progressive Conservative	Nicolle Carlin	2,287	25.65	-14.6
Green	Simon Ouellette	1,860	20.86	-18.0
New Democratic	Nicki Lyons-MacFarlane	165	1.85	+0.3
Total valid votes		8,917	99.85	
Total rejected ballots		13	0.15	
Turnout		8,930	69.44	
Eligible voters		12,860		
Liberal notional gain from Progressive Conservative		Swing		+26.1
This district was created by splitting Fredericton South, which elected a Green Party member in the previous election, into two new districts. David Coon was the incumbent from Fredericton South, and will be running in the other district, Fredericton-Lincoln.

=== Bathurst East-Nepisiguit-Saint-Isidore ===
New Brunswick provincial by-election, April 24, 2023: Bathurst East-Nepisiguit-Saint-Isidore Resignation of Denis Landry to run for mayor of Hautes-Terres
Party	Candidate	Votes	%	±%
Liberal	Susan Holt	2,343	58.85	-4.91
Green	Serge Brideau	1,411	35.44	+23.22
New Democratic	Alex White	227	5.70	
Total valid votes		3,981	99.30	
Total rejected ballots		28	0.70	+0.29
Turnout		4,009	37.59	-23.01
Eligible voters		10,666		
Liberal hold		Swing		-14.06
Source: Elections New Brunswick

=== Fredericton South ===
2018 New Brunswick general election
Party	Candidate	Votes	%	±%
Green	David Coon	4,273	56.31	+25.63
Liberal	Susan Holt	1,525	20.10	-1.52
Progressive Conservative	Scott Smith	1,042	13.73	-12.44
People's Alliance	Bonnie Clark	616	8.12	--
New Democratic	Chris Durrant	132	1.74	-18.04
Total valid votes		7,588	100.0	
Total rejected ballots				
Turnout				
Eligible voters				
Green hold		Swing		+13.6
Source: Elections New Brunswick

Order of precedence
Preceded by Tim Houston as Premier of Nova Scotia	Order of Precedence of Canada as Premier of New Brunswick	Succeeded by Wab Kinew as Premier of Manitoba
