= Treasury Board (New Brunswick) =

The Treasury Board is the name of a cabinet committee and associated government ministry in the Canadian province of New Brunswick. It was established in the 1970s, following best practices that began in the 1960s in the Canadian federal government with the creation of an independent Treasury Board Secretariat in 1966. It was an independent entity in New Brunswick from 1972 to 1991, when it was merged into the Department of Finance. From 1991 to 2001, all of its functions were exercised by the finance department, until its human and information resource oversight functions were spun off to the Office of Human Resources and the Department of Supply and Services.

It was briefly an independent agency again from 2011 to 2012 and has been since 2016. It was named Board of Management from 1982 to 2016.

Minister	Term	Administration
Chairman of the Treasury Board
Jean-Paul LeBlanc	1972-1974	Richard Hatfield
Stewart Brooks	1974-1976	Richard Hatfield
Jean-Maurice Simard	1976-1982	Richard Hatfield
Chairman of the Board of Management
Harold Fanjoy	1982-1985	Richard Hatfield
Yvon Poitras	1985-1987	Richard Hatfield
Gerald Clavette	1987-1991	Frank McKenna
Minister responsible for the Management Board
Blaine Higgs	2011-2012	David Alward
President of the Treasury Board
Roger Melanson	2016-present	Brian Gallant
