= Hautes-Terres-Nepisiguit =

Provincial electoral district in New Brunswick, Canada

New Brunswick electoral district

Provincial electoral district
- Legislature: Legislative Assembly of New Brunswick
MLA
Luc Robichaud
Liberal
- District created: 2023
- First contested: 2024

Hautes-Terres-Nepisiguit is a provincial electoral district for the Legislative Assembly of New Brunswick, Canada. It was created from most of Bathurst East-Nepisiguit-Saint-Isidore and parts of Caraquet and Bathurst West-Beresford.

== District created ==
It was created in 2023 and was first contested in the 2024 New Brunswick general election. It is the successor to Bathurst East-Nepisiguit-Saint-Isidore, comprising the municipalities of Bathurst, Hautes-Terres, and a part of the Chaleur Rural District.

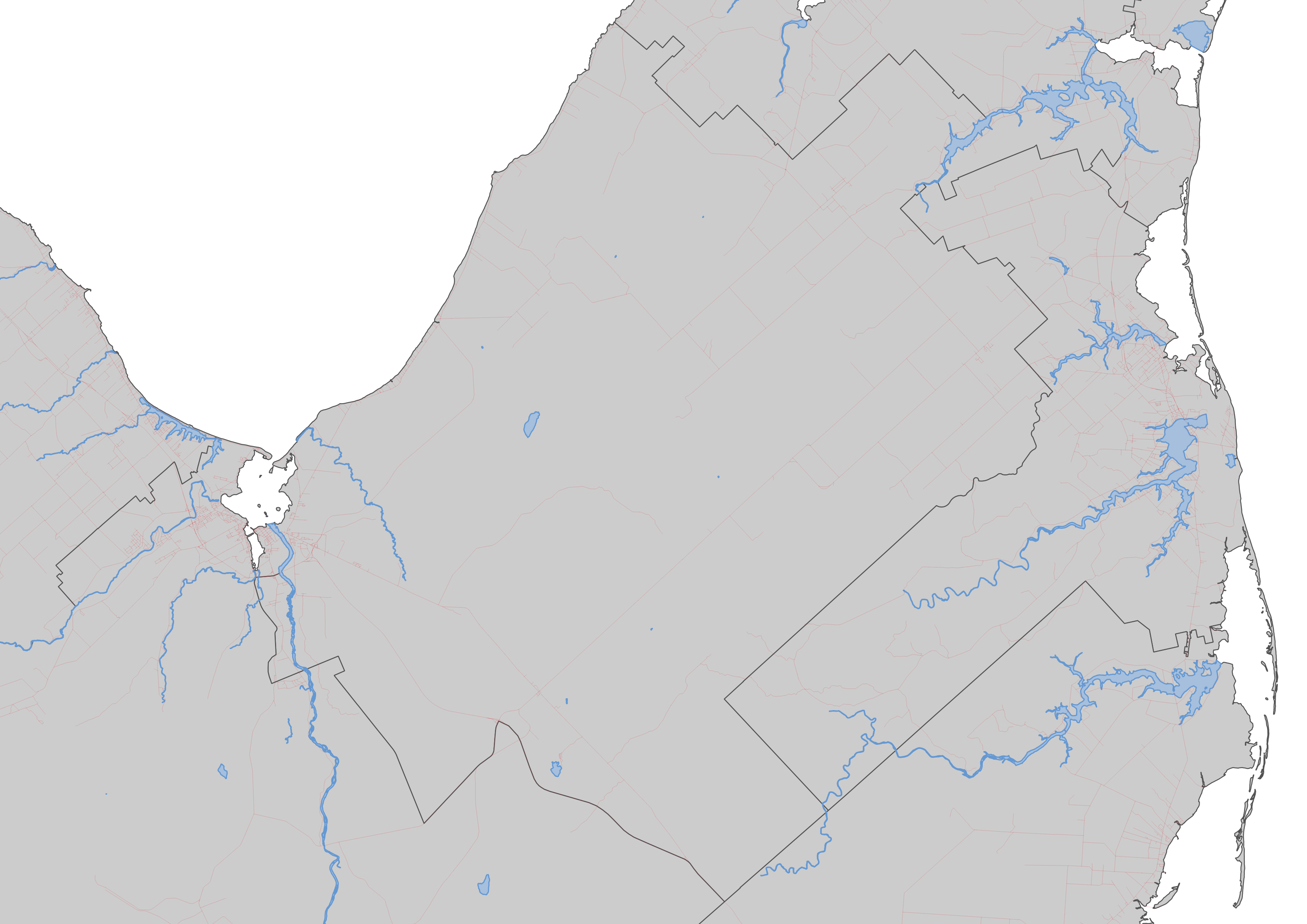
Hautes-Terres-Nepisiguit (as it exists from 2023) and the roads in the riding

== Members of the Legislative Assembly ==
Assembly	Years	Member	Party
Riding created from Bathurst East-Nepisiguit-Saint-Isidore, Caraquet and Bathurst West-Beresford
61st	2024–Present	Luc Robichaud	Liberal

== Election results ==
2024 New Brunswick general election
Party	Candidate	Votes	%	±%
Liberal	Luc Robichaud	4,675	76.3%	+7.5
Progressive Conservative	Jason Purdy	1,454	23.7%	+4.8
Total valid votes		6,129		
Total rejected ballots				
Turnout				
Eligible voters				
Source: Elections New Brunswick

2020 provincial election redistributed results
Party	%
Liberal	68.8
Progressive Conservative	18.9
Green	12.3

== See also ==
- List of New Brunswick provincial electoral districts
- Canadian provincial electoral districts
