= Fredericton South-Silverwood =

Upcoming provincial electoral district in New Brunswick, Canada

New Brunswick electoral district

Provincial electoral district
- Legislature: Legislative Assembly of New Brunswick
MLA
Susan Holt
Liberal
- District created: 2023
- First contested: 2024

Demographics
- Census division(s): York
- Census subdivision(s): Fredericton, Hanwell

Fredericton South-Silverwood (French: Fredericton-Sud-Silverwood) is a provincial electoral district for the Legislative Assembly of New Brunswick, Canada. It was created when the Fredericton South district was split into two, creating this district and Fredericton-Lincoln. The remainder of the district was carved out of Fredericton West-Hanwell. It was first contested during the 2024 New Brunswick general election.

Fredericton South-Silverwood was proposed in 2022 and created in 2023, though it received opposing reactions from residents and members of the Green Party.

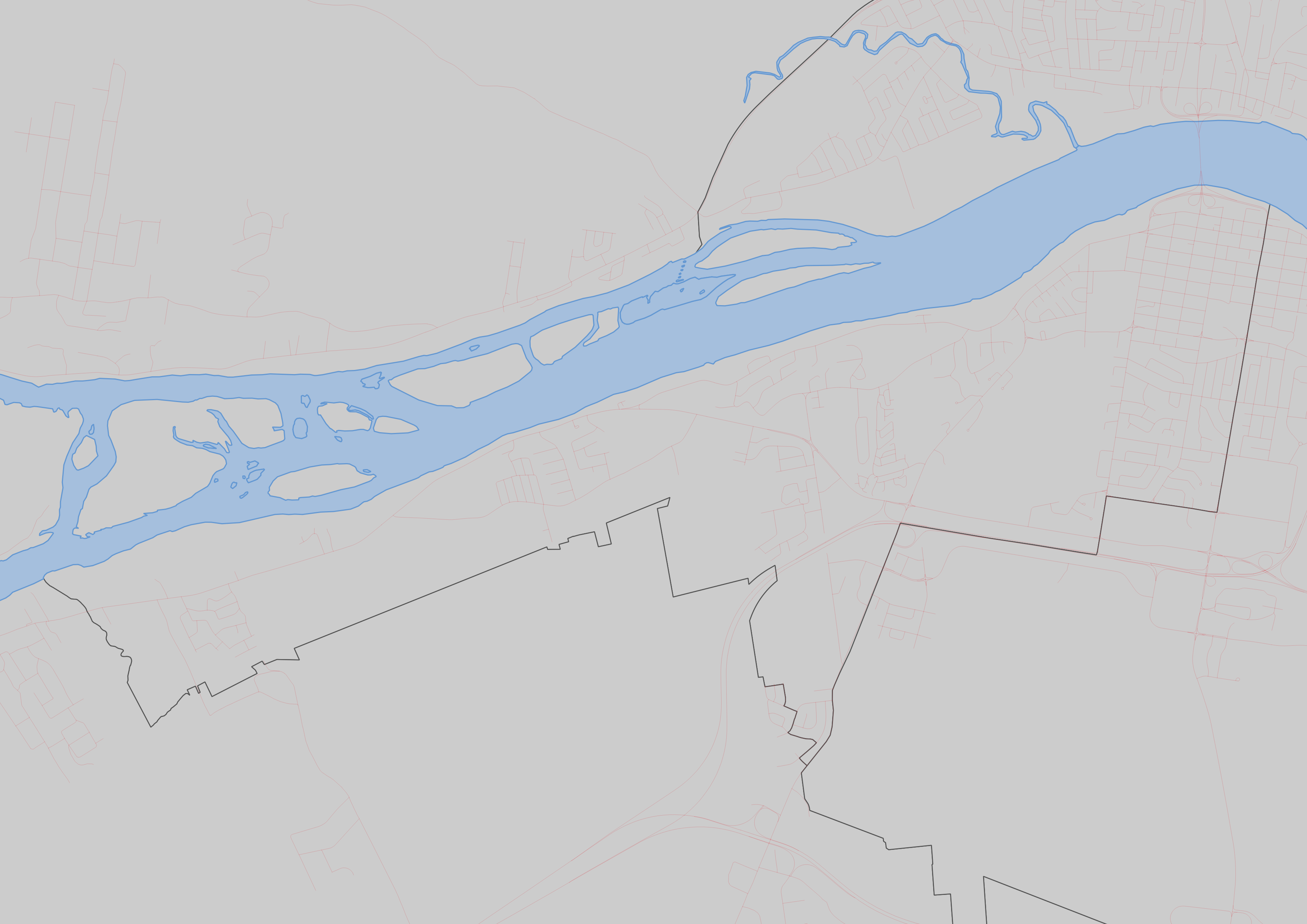
Fredericton South-Silverwood (as it exists from 2023) and the roads in the riding

== Members of the Legislative Assembly ==
Assembly	Years	Member	Party
Riding created from Fredericton West-Hanwell and Fredericton South
61st	2024–Present	Susan Holt	Liberal

== Election results ==
2024 New Brunswick general election
** Preliminary results — Not yet official **
Party	Candidate	Votes	%	±%
Liberal	Susan Holt	4,604	51.64	+37.5
Progressive Conservative	Nicolle Carlin	2,287	25.65	-14.6
Green	Simon Ouellette	1,860	20.86	-18.0
New Democratic	Nicki Lyons-MacFarlane	165	1.85	+0.3
Total valid votes		8,916	99.89	
Total rejected ballots		10	0.11	
Turnout		8,926	71.28	
Eligible voters		11,522		
Liberal notional gain from Progressive Conservative		Swing		+26.1
This district was created by splitting Fredericton South, which elected a Green Party member in the previous election, into two new districts. David Coon was the incumbent from Fredericton South, and will be running in the other district, Fredericton-Lincoln.

2020 provincial election redistributed results
Party	%
Progressive Conservative	40.3
Green	38.9
Liberal	14.1
People's Alliance	5.1
New Democratic	1.6

== See also ==
- List of New Brunswick provincial electoral districts
- Canadian provincial electoral districts
