= Shediac Bay-Dieppe =

Provincial electoral district in New Brunswick, Canada

New Brunswick electoral district
- The riding of Shediac Bay-Dieppe (as it exists from 2023) in relation to other New Brunswick electoral districts
- Coordinates: 46.235°N 64.673°W

Provincial electoral district
- Legislature: Legislative Assembly of New Brunswick
MLA
Robert Gauvin
Liberal
- District created: 2013
- First contested: 2014
- Last contested: 2024

Demographics
- Population (2011): 15,854
- Electors (2013): 11,224
- Census division(s): Westmorland, Kent
- Census subdivision(s): Beaubassin East, Cocagne, Dieppe, Dundas, Moncton (parish), Shediac (parish), Shediac (town)

Shediac Bay-Dieppe (French: Baie-de-Shediac-Dieppe) is a provincial electoral district for the Legislative Assembly of New Brunswick, Canada. It was first contested in the 2014 general election, having been created in the 2013 redistribution of electoral boundaries.

The district runs from the coastal communities of Cocagne and Grande-Digue inland to include parts of the city of Dieppe. It drew significant pockets of population from three former electoral districts: Kent South, Dieppe Centre-Lewisville and Memramcook-Lakeville-Dieppe; as well as minor parts from Shediac-Cap-Pelé.

Brian Gallant, the 33rd Premier of New Brunswick, was re-elected in this district in 2014 and 2018.

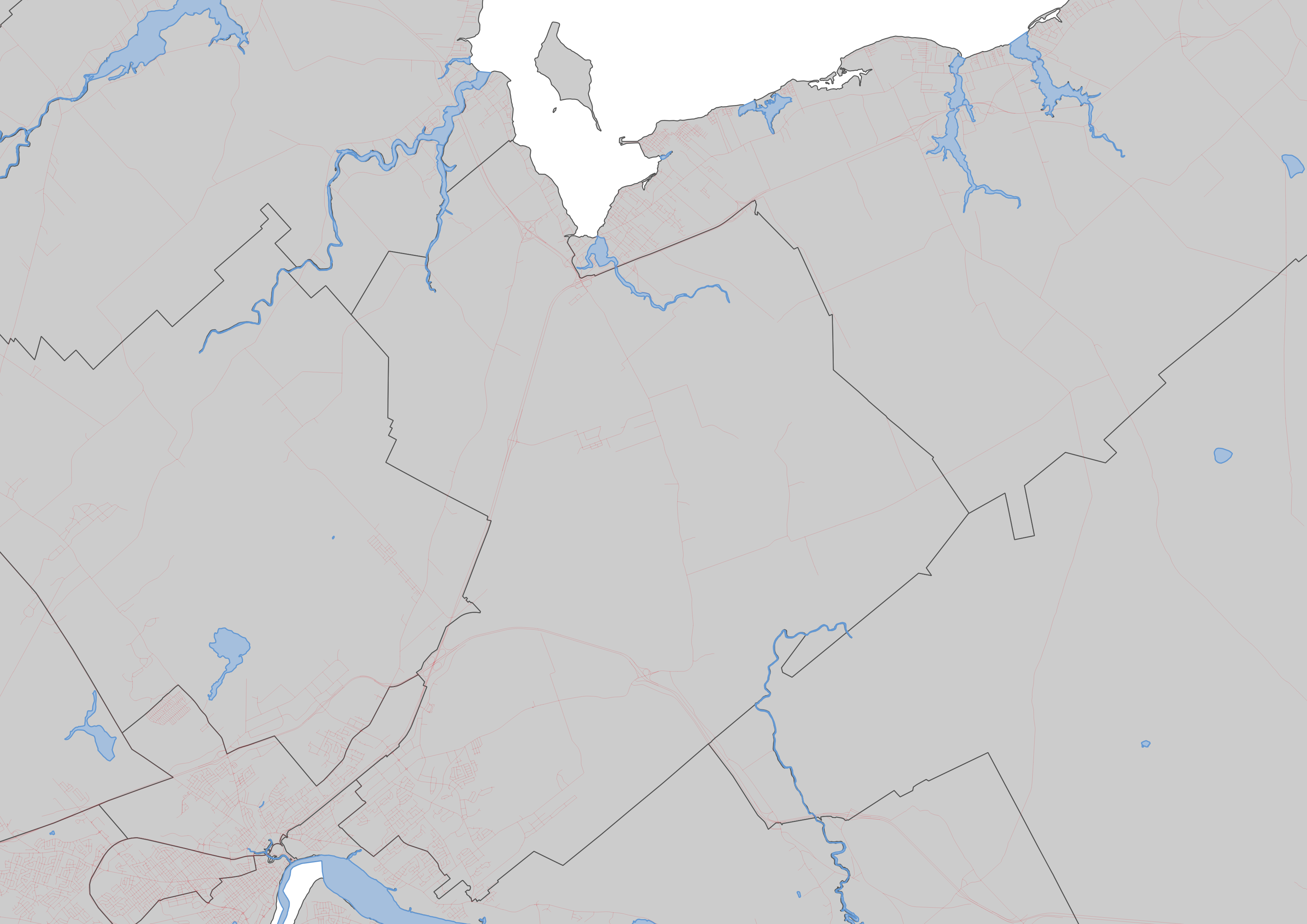
Shediac Bay-Dieppe (as it exists from 2023) and the roads in the riding

== Members of the Legislative Assembly ==
Assembly	Years	Member	Party
Riding created from Kent South, Dieppe Centre-Lewisville, Memramcook-Lakeville-Dieppe and Shediac-Cap-Pelé
58th	2014–2018	Brian Gallant	Liberal
59th	2018–2019	Brian Gallant	Liberal
60th	2020–2024	Robert Gauvin	Liberal
61st	2024–Present	Robert Gauvin	Liberal

== Election results ==
2024 New Brunswick general election
Party	Candidate	Votes	%	±%
Liberal	Robert Gauvin	6,530	68.1%	+7.96
Progressive Conservative	René Ephestion	1,803	18.8%	-11.80
Green	Chantal Landry	1,254	13.1%	
Total valid votes		9,587		
Total rejected ballots				
Turnout				
Eligible voters				
Liberal hold		Swing		
Source: Elections New Brunswick

2020 New Brunswick general election
Party	Candidate	Votes	%	±%
Liberal	Robert Gauvin	5,839	60.14	-6.95
Progressive Conservative	Mathieu Gérald Caissie	2,971	30.60	+15.87
New Democratic	Delphine Daigle	528	5.44	-2.88
People's Alliance	Phillip Coombes	371	3.82	
Total valid votes		9,709	100.00	
Total rejected ballots		54	0.55	+0.02
Turnout		9,763	71.49	+3.42
Eligible voters		13,657		
Liberal hold		Swing		-11.41
Source: Elections New Brunswick

2018 New Brunswick general election
Party	Candidate	Votes	%	±%
Liberal	Brian Gallant	6,162	67.09	+2.48
Progressive Conservative	Paulin Blaise Ngweth	1,353	14.73	-4.42
Green	Michel Albert	906	9.86	+2.79
New Democratic	Michel Boudreau	764	8.32	-0.85
Total valid votes		9,185	99.47	
Total rejected ballots		49	0.53	+0.19
Turnout		9,234	68.06	-0.57
Eligible voters		13,567		
Liberal hold		Swing		+3.45
Source: Elections New Brunswick

2014 New Brunswick general election
Party	Candidate	Votes	%
Liberal	Brian Gallant	5,661	64.61
Progressive Conservative	Dolorès Poirier	1,678	19.15
New Democratic	Agathe Lapointe	803	9.16
Green	Stephanie Matthews	620	7.08
Total valid votes		8,762	99.66
Total rejected ballots		30	0.34
Turnout		8,792	68.63
Eligible voters		12,810	
This riding was created from parts of Kent South, Dieppe Centre-Lewisville, Memramcook-Lakeville-Dieppe and Shediac-Cap-Pelé, which elected three Liberals and one Progressive Conservative (Kent South). Neither of the incumbents ran in this election.
Source: Elections New Brunswick

== See also ==
- List of New Brunswick provincial electoral districts
- Canadian provincial electoral districts
