= Richard Losier =

Canadian politician

Richard Losier is a Canadian politician and member of the New Brunswick Liberal Association who was elected to the New Brunswick legislature as MLA for Dieppe in a by-election on April 24, 2023. Despite having been touted as a possible health minister should a Liberal government be elected, on May 28, 2024, Losier announced that he would not stand in the 2024 provincial election due to "personal reasons".
