= Mary Wilson (politician) =

Canadian politician

Mary Wilson MLA
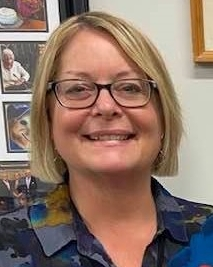

Minister of Service New Brunswick
- In office June 27, 2023 – November 2, 2024
- Preceded by: Jill Green
- Succeeded by: Aaron Kennedy
- In office September 29, 2020 – October 13, 2022
- Premier: Blaine Higgs
- Preceded by: Sherry Wilson
- Succeeded by: Jill Green

Minister of Economic Development and Small Business
- In office November 9, 2018 – September 29, 2020
- Premier: Blaine Higgs
- Preceded by: Francine Landry (Economic Development)
- Succeeded by: Arlene Dunn

Member of the New Brunswick Legislative Assembly for Oromocto-Lincoln-Fredericton
- Incumbent
- Assumed office September 24, 2018
- Preceded by: Jody Carr

Personal details
- Party: Progressive Conservative

Mary E. Wilson is a Canadian politician, who was elected to the Legislative Assembly of New Brunswick in the 2018 election. She represents the electoral district of Oromocto-Lincoln-Fredericton as a member of the Progressive Conservative Party of New Brunswick.

She was re-elected in the 2020 and provincial elections.

Wilson was a Minister in the Higgs government.

== Election results ==
2024 New Brunswick general election: Oromocto-Sunbury
Party	Candidate	Votes	%	±%
Progressive Conservative	Mary Wilson	4,381	52.7%	-3.4
Liberal	Stephen Horsman	2,725	32.8%	+18.3
Green	Emerald Gibson	868	10.4%	-3.0
New Democratic	Glenna Hanley	341	4.1%	+2.4
Total valid votes		8,315		
Total rejected ballots				
Turnout				
Eligible voters				
Progressive Conservative hold		Swing		
Source: Elections New Brunswick

2020 New Brunswick general election
Party	Candidate	Votes	%	±%
Progressive Conservative	Mary Wilson	3,374	44.25	+12.30
Liberal	Steven Burns	2,072	27.18	-3.48
Green	Gail Costello	1,306	17.13	+5.13
People's Alliance	Craig Rector	745	9.77	-13.42
New Democratic	Natasha Akhtar	127	1.67	-0.45
Total valid votes		7,624	100.0	
Total rejected ballots		30	0.39	
Turnout		7,654	64.71	
Eligible voters		11,829		
Progressive Conservative hold		Swing		+7.89

2018 New Brunswick general election
Party	Candidate	Votes	%	±%
Progressive Conservative	Mary Wilson	2,399	32.0	
Liberal	John Fife	2,306	30.7	
People's Alliance	Craig Rector	1,741	23.2	
Green	Tom McLean	903	12.0	
New Democratic	Justin Young	159	2.1	
Total valid votes		7,508	100.0	
Total rejected ballots		14		
Turnout		7,522	66.53	
Eligible voters		11,306		
