= Dieppe (electoral district) =

Provincial electoral district in New Brunswick, Canada

New Brunswick electoral district
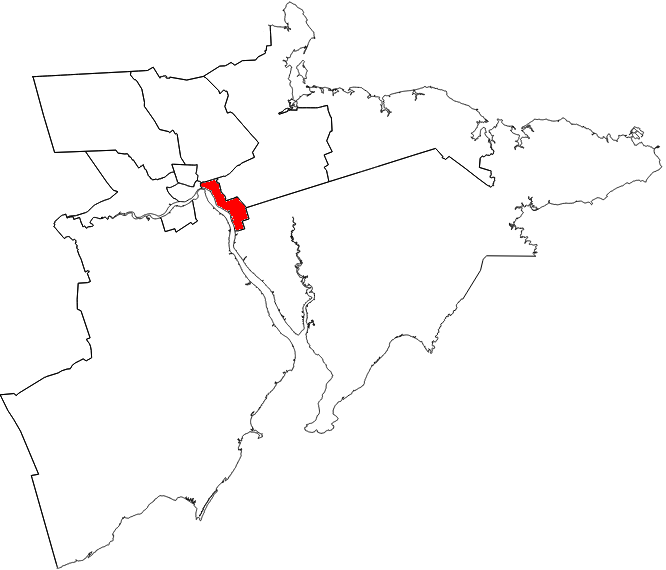
- The riding of Dieppe in relation to other southeastern New Brunswick electoral districts
- Coordinates: 46.077°N 64.712°W

Defunct provincial electoral district
- Legislature: Legislative Assembly of New Brunswick
- District created: 2006
- District abolished: 2023
- First contested: 2006
- Last contested: 2020

Demographics
- Population (2011): 14,494
- Electors (2013): 10,870
- Census division(s): Westmorland
- Census subdivision(s): Dieppe

Dieppe was a provincial electoral district for the Legislative Assembly of New Brunswick, Canada.

It was created in 2006 as a result of large population growth in the City of Dieppe. It includes 4 of 5 wards of the city of Dieppe and a small portion of Moncton near Champlain Place shopping mall. The name of the district was briefly Dieppe Centre, but the legislature changed it to Dieppe Centre-Lewisville before an election was held in the district. In the 2013 redistribution it lost those parts of Moncton in the district, gained some parts of Dieppe from the abolished district of Memramcook-Lakeville-Dieppe, while losing some of Dieppe to the new district of Shediac Bay-Dieppe.

== Members of the Legislative Assembly ==
Assembly	Years	Member	Party
Dieppe Centre-Lewisville; Riding created from Dieppe-Memramcook and Moncton East
56th	2006–2010	Cy LeBlanc	Progressive Conservative
57th	2010–2014	Roger Melanson	Liberal
Dieppe
58th	2014–2018	Roger Melanson	Liberal
59th	2018–2020	Roger Melanson	Liberal
60th	2020–2022	Roger Melanson	Liberal
60th	2023–2024	Richard Losier	Liberal
Riding dissolved into Dieppe-Memramcook and Shediac Bay-Dieppe

== Election results ==
=== Dieppe ===
New Brunswick provincial by-election, April 24, 2023 Resignation of Roger Melanson
Party	Candidate	Votes	%	±%
Liberal	Richard Losier	2,424	69.88	+9.71
Green	Chantal Landry	651	18.77	+3.71
Progressive Conservative	Dean Léonard	298	8.59	-13.56
New Democratic	Cyprien Okana	96	2.77	+0.13
Total valid votes		3,469	99.97	
Total rejected ballots		1	0.03	-0.22
Turnout		3,470	31.42	-34.54
Eligible voters		11,045		
Liberal hold		Swing		+3.00
Source: Elections New Brunswick

2020 New Brunswick general election
Party	Candidate	Votes	%	±%
Liberal	Roger Melanson	4,564	60.16	-11.41
Progressive Conservative	Patricia Arsenault	1,680	22.15	+8.34
Green	Mélyssa Boudreau	1,142	15.05	New
New Democratic	Pamela Boudreau	200	2.64	-11.99
Total valid votes		7,586	99.75	
Total rejected ballots		19	0.25	-0.36
Turnout		7,605	65.96	+0.95
Eligible voters		11,530		
Liberal hold		Swing		-9.87
Source: Elections New Brunswick

2018 New Brunswick general election
Party	Candidate	Votes	%	±%
Liberal	Roger Melanson	5,173	71.57	+5.60
New Democratic	Joyce Richardson	1,057	14.62	+4.65
Progressive Conservative	Pierre Brine	998	13.81	-4.63
Total valid votes		7,228	99.39	
Total rejected ballots		44	0.61	+0.29
Turnout		7,272	65.01	-0.36
Eligible voters		11,186		
Liberal hold		Swing		+0.48

2014 New Brunswick general election
Party	Candidate	Votes	%	±%
Liberal	Roger Melanson	4,866	65.97	+19.69
Progressive Conservative	Normand Léger	1,360	18.44	-16.47
New Democratic	Sandy Harquail	736	9.98	-1.76
Green	Françoise Aubin	414	5.61	-1.46
Total valid votes		7,376	99.69	
Total rejected ballots		23	0.31	-0.65
Turnout		7,399	65.37	-3.02
Eligible voters		11,319		
Liberal notional hold		Swing		+18.08
Source: Elections New Brunswick

=== Dieppe Centre-Lewisville ===
2010 New Brunswick general election
Party	Candidate	Votes	%	±%
Liberal	Roger Melanson	4,542	46.28	-1.87
Progressive Conservative	Dave Maltais	3,426	34.91	-13.89
New Democratic	Agathe Lapointe	1,152	11.74	+8.70
Green	Paul LeBreton	694	7.07	–
Total valid votes		9,814	99.04	
Total rejected ballots		95	0.96	+0.26
Turnout		9,909	68.39	-2.42
Eligible voters		14,489		
Liberal gain from Progressive Conservative		Swing		+6.01
Source: Elections New Brunswick

2006 New Brunswick general election
Party	Candidate	Votes	%
Progressive Conservative	Cy LeBlanc	4,347	48.80
Liberal	Bruno Roy	4,289	48.15
New Democratic	Valier Santerre	271	3.04
Total valid votes		8,907	99.30
Total rejected ballots		63	0.70
Turnout		8,970	70.81
Eligible voters		12,668	
