= Brian Gallant =

Premier of New Brunswick from 2014 to 2018

Brian Gallant KC
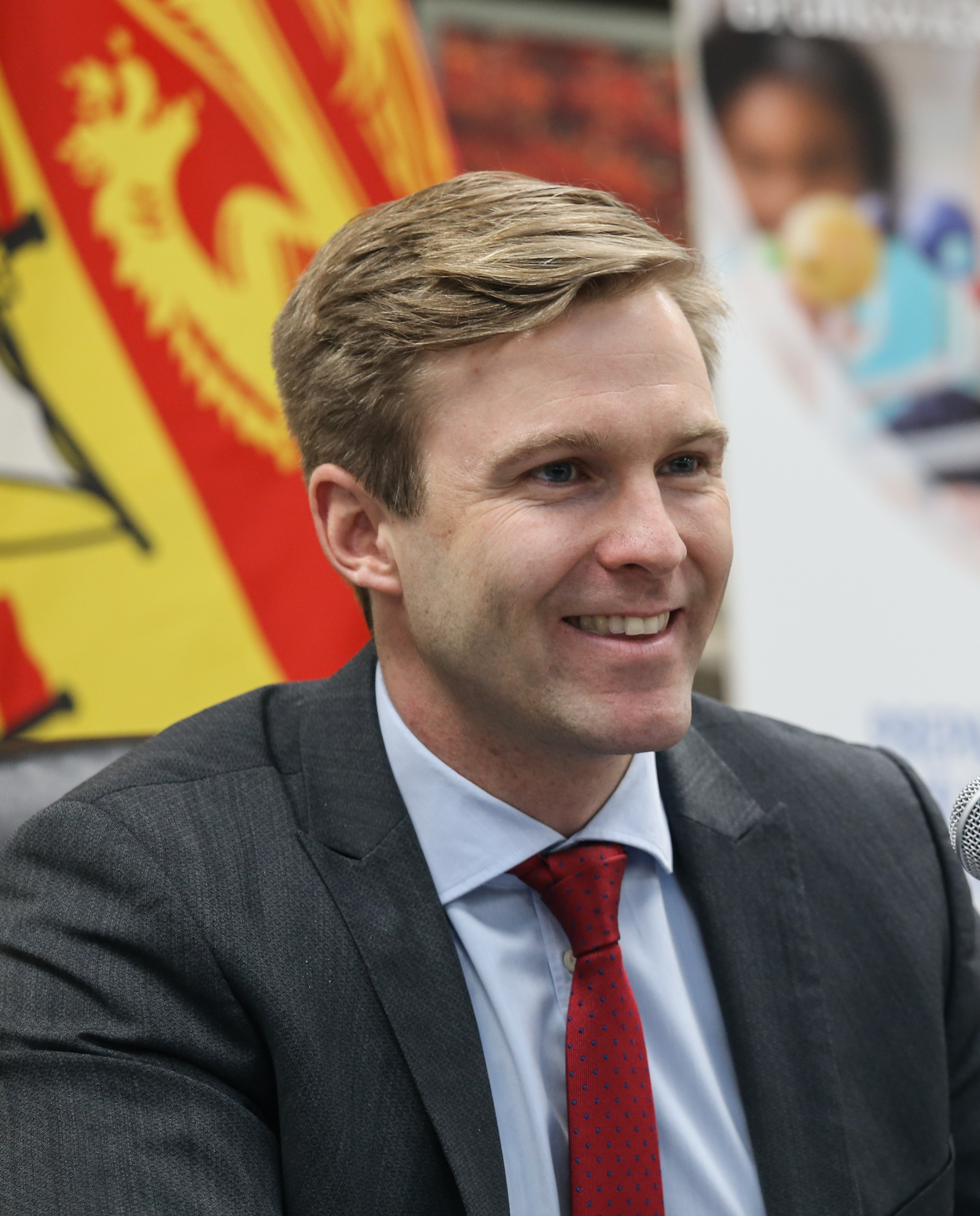
- Gallant in 2017

33rd Premier of New Brunswick
- In office October 7, 2014 – November 9, 2018
- Monarch: Elizabeth II
- Lieutenant Governor: Graydon Nicholas; Jocelyne Roy-Vienneau
- Deputy: Stephen Horsman
- Preceded by: David Alward
- Succeeded by: Blaine Higgs

Attorney General of New Brunswick
- In office May 11, 2018 – November 9, 2018
- Premier: Himself
- Preceded by: Serge Rousselle
- Succeeded by: Andrea Anderson-Mason

Leader of the Opposition of New Brunswick
- In office November 9, 2018 – February 14, 2019
- Preceded by: Blaine Higgs
- Succeeded by: Denis Landry
- In office April 30, 2013 – October 7, 2014
- Preceded by: Victor Boudreau
- Succeeded by: Bruce Fitch

Leader of the New Brunswick Liberal Association
- In office October 27, 2012 – February 12, 2019
- Preceded by: Shawn Graham; Victor Boudreau (interim)
- Succeeded by: Denis Landry

Member of the New Brunswick Legislative Assembly for Shediac Bay-Dieppe Kent (2013–2014)
- In office April 15, 2013 – October 7, 2019
- Preceded by: Shawn Graham
- Succeeded by: Robert Gauvin

Personal details
- Born: Brian Alexander Gallant; April 27, 1982 (age 44) Shediac Bridge, New Brunswick, Canada
- Party: New Brunswick Liberal Association
- Spouse: Karine Lavoie (m. 2017)
- Education: Université de Moncton (BBA, LLB); McGill University (LLM)
- Occupation: Politician, Lawyer

Brian Alexander Gallant KC (born April 27, 1982) is a Canadian retired politician who served as the 33rd premier of New Brunswick from October 7, 2014 to November 9, 2018. Of Acadian and Dutch descent, Gallant practised as a lawyer before winning the Liberal leadership in October 2012, securing the riding of Kent in a by-election on April 15, 2013, shortly followed by his swearing in as Leader of the Opposition. After the 2014 election, in which the Progressive Conservative government of David Alward was defeated, Gallant was sworn in as Premier at the age of 32.

At age 32, he was the second youngest Premier of New Brunswick to assume office (George Edwin King became premier at age 30 in 1870). When Gallant left office at age 36, he was the youngest premier in Canada at the time and second-youngest in history.

Gallant's government was narrowly defeated for re-election in 2018 by the Progressive Conservatives of Blaine Higgs, with Gallant's Liberals winning 21 seats to the PCs' 22, despite the Liberals winning the popular vote by nearly six percentage points. Gallant announced on November 15, 2018, that he would be stepping down as Liberal leader as soon as a leadership election was held to choose his successor. He resigned as MLA for Shediac Bay-Dieppe on October 7, 2019.

Gallant is CEO of the Canadian Centre for the Purpose of the Corporation, a research think tank.

== Early life ==
Gallant was born in Shediac Bridge. His Acadian father, Pierre, was the youngest of seven children, while his mother, Marilyn (born Scholten), was the child of Dutch immigrants who arrived in the 1950s. He also has two siblings, Melissa and Pierre. In his youth, he was educated at a variety of schools across New Brunswick; he ascribed his many moves to his parents' search for work, labouring at minimum wage jobs in convenience stores and fast food restaurants, eventually having to move the family into the small home of Gallant's grandparents. He ended up graduating from Polyvalente Louis-J.-Robichaud back in Shediac - his principal recalled telling Gallant he predicted he would one day be Premier, saying, "You have all the qualities of being a future premier here in New Brunswick." Gallant says his interest in politics started when, with nobody else offering, he became vice president of his grade 5 class, and by the end of his teenage years he decided he would pursue a political career.

In order to pay his way through university, he started and ran two small companies, eventually allowing him to graduate from the Université de Moncton with both a BA in Business Administration and a Bachelor of Laws degree, later receiving a Master's in Law from McGill University. Whilst at Moncton, he was made president of the student federation. Afterwards, he practised corporate and commercial law with the firm Stewart McKelvey, and then became a partner at Veritas Law in Dieppe.

== Early political career ==
His first foray into provincial politics came at 24, when he secured the Liberal nomination to run against Premier Bernard Lord in the Progressive Conservative's riding of Moncton East for the 2006 election. Although in the end Lord held his seat, the election was far from being a runaway. The campaign against a sitting premier gave added exposure to Gallant.

When the Liberal government of Shawn Graham was defeated in 2010, Gallant authored a paper on reforming the Liberal Party, to make it more accessible for new members and a new generation of leaders to emerge; many of its recommendations were reportedly adopted. After Graham's resignation as leader of the party, Gallant put himself forward to succeed him, winning against former justice minister Mike Murphy and dairy farmer Nick Duivenvorden in its 2012 leadership election. After a successful by-election run in Graham's former riding of Kent, where he gained a commanding lead, Gallant was sworn into the Legislative Assembly on April 30, 2013, making him Leader of the Opposition to David Alward's PC government.

== Leader of the Opposition ==
Heading into the 2014 election campaign, Gallant pushed a $900 million package of infrastructure spending over six years as a way to create 1,700 jobs for a province with one of the country's worst unemployment rates. He also campaigned on a tax rate increase for some of the province's biggest earners, and on removing property tax breaks for businesses. The Liberal platform also promised a rise in the minimum wage, from $10 per hour, to $10.30 per hour by the end of 2014, and to $11 by the end of 2017.

== Premier ==
On an election night marred by technical glitches with the voting tabulators, the Liberals won a majority and formed the government in the 58th New Brunswick Legislature with Gallant as Premier on October 7, 2014. Gallant's first cabinet, of 13 members, was smaller than the outgoing cabinet.

During his government's mandate the province's economy and exports grew each year; the unemployment rate which was hovering around 10% was reduced to just over 7%; in 2016 KPMG found that three of the four most cost competitive cities in which to do business in Canada and the United States were in New Brunswick; one of the most vibrant cybersecurity clusters in North America was developed in New Brunswick's capital city; and the province saw its first budget surplus in a decade.

The 2016 census found that New Brunswick was the only province in Canada to see a drop in population from the 2011 census, declining 0.5% to 747,101 people. Just two years later, however, due largely to an influx of immigrants and non-permanent residents, the province's population grew to a record high surpassing 770,000 people for the first time. For instance, in 2016, New Brunswick welcomed the most Syrian refugees displaced by the humanitarian crisis per capita of all the provinces in the country, welcoming almost 1,500 refugees.

The Gallant government increased the budget for education and early childhood development by 15% over its mandate in order to invest in literacy initiatives, introduce coding in more schools, and reintroduce trades in high schools.

The Gallant government created programs to help the middle class with the cost of childcare and to provide free childcare to families which need the most support. The Gallant government also created programs to help the middle class with the cost of tuition and to provide free tuition for those who need the most support.

The Gallant government eliminated the two-doctor rule that was hindering women's right to choose abortion for decades in New Brunswick. Gallant was the first premier in the history of New Brunswick to walk in a pride parade.

The Gallant government also advanced women's equality by moving pay equity forward to the point of New Brunswick having the second lowest gender wage gap of all the Canadian provinces in 2017; by having over 50% of government appointments to agencies, boards, and commissions go to women; and by providing the first gender parity on New Brunswick's provincial court.

Gallant has repeatedly stated that climate change is the greatest challenge facing humanity. With this in mind, the Gallant government took concrete action to protect the environment including by creating the “Transitioning to a Low Carbon Economy” plan which commits to historic measures to fight climate change. The Gallant government also placed a moratorium on hydraulic fracturing and a ban on the disposal of fracked wastewater in municipal systems.

In addition to premier, Gallant has served New Brunswick as the Attorney General, the Minister responsible for innovation, the Minister responsible for women's equality, and the Leader of Her Majesty's Loyal Opposition.

The 2018 provincial election resulted in Gallant's Liberals winning only 21 seats compared to Blaine Higgs and the Progressive Conservative Party of New Brunswick who won 22. Gallant vowed to attempt to remain in power with a minority government and hoped to retain the confidence of the Legislative Assembly of New Brunswick either on a vote-by-vote basis or with the agreement of the smaller parties, the Green Party of New Brunswick and the People's Alliance of New Brunswick, each of which won 3 seats in the election.

On November 2, 2018, Gallant's Liberal minority government was defeated by a confidence vote on its throne speech by a margin of 25 to 23 with the opposition Progressive Conservatives and People's Alliance voting against the government and the Greens voting with the government.

=== Resignation ===
Gallant resigned as premier on November 2, 2018, after a vote of non confidence was held in the New Brunswick legislature. Blaine Higgs was appointed in his place after having won the most seats in the 2018 provincial general election. Gallant announced his intention to step down as Liberal leader days later and officially resigned as Liberal leader and Leader of the Opposition in February 2019, also announcing that he would not be standing for re-election as an MLA.

In September 2019, he announced his intention to resign his seat in the legislature by October 7, 2019, after accepting a position as an advisor to the president of Ryerson University (now Toronto Metropolitan University) in Toronto on innovation, cybersecurity, and the law. In the 2020 general election his seat was retained for the Liberals by Robert Gauvin.

== After politics ==
Gallant is currently the CEO of the Canadian Centre for the Purpose of the Corporation, a think-tank which publishes thought leadership and research about the evolving purpose of business in society. In 2021, Gallant co-authored a report with Global Canada on “Canadian Voices on the Role of Business in Society”.

Since leaving office, Gallant has been a vocal champion of bilingualism. In 2019, the former premier authored a report on Bilingualism in New Brunswick– Canada's only officially bilingual province.

Gallant has also been a weekly business and public policy commentator including on CBC Power & Politics, Radio-Canada's zone économie and Radio-Canada's coverage of the 2021 Canadian federal general election. In May 2021 he appeared on Ici Radio-Canada's literary debate show Le Combat des livres, advocating for Jean Babineau's novel Infini. Gallant also serves on the boards of the Canadian Olympic Foundation and Asia-Pacific Foundation of Canada. In 2022, Gallant was named the CEO of Space Canada. He declined to run in the 2025 Liberal Party of Canada leadership election.

== Electoral record ==
2006 New Brunswick general election: Moncton East
| Party | Candidate | Votes | % | ±% |
|---|---|---|---|---|
| Progressive Conservative | Bernard Lord | 3816 | 54.8% | +2.7% |
| Liberal | Brian Gallant | 2827 | 40.6% | +1.8% |
| New Democratic | Mark Robar | 319 | 4.6% | -4.4% |

2012 Liberal leadership election results
| Candidate | Points | % |
|---|---|---|
| Brian Gallant | 3,259.44 | 59.26 |
| Michael Murphy | 2,089.39 | 37.99 |
| Nick Duivenvoorden | 151.17 | 2.75 |

April 15, 2013 by-election: Kent
| Party | Candidate | Votes | % | ±% |
|---|---|---|---|---|
| Liberal | Brian Gallant | 3,543 | 59.10% | +3.38 |
| NDP | Susan Levi-Peters | 1,615 | 26.94% | +11.62 |
| Progressive Conservative | Jimmy Bourque | 837 | 13.96% | -11.79 |

2014 New Brunswick general election: Shediac Bay-Dieppe
| Party | Candidate | Votes | % | ±% |
|---|---|---|---|---|
| Liberal | Brian Gallant | 5,661 | 64.61 | |
| Progressive Conservative | Dolorès Poirier | 1,678 | 19.15 | |
| New Democratic | Agathe Lapointe | 803 | 9.16 | |
| Green | Stephanie Matthews | 620 | 7.08 | |
| Total valid votes | | 8,762 | 69.54 | |
| Eligible voters | | 12,643 | | |
| Liberal notional gain | | Swing | | |

2018 New Brunswick general election
| Party | Candidate | Votes | % | ±% |
|---|---|---|---|---|
| Liberal | Brian Gallant | 6,162 | 67.09 | +2.48 |
| Progressive Conservative | Paulin Blaise Ngweth | 1,353 | 14.73 | -4.42 |
| Green | Michel Albert | 906 | 9.96 | +2.79 |
| New Democratic | Michel Boudreau | 764 | 8.32 | -0.85 |
| Total valid votes | | 9,185 | 99.48 | |
| Total rejected ballots | | 48 | 0.52 | +0.18 |
| Turnout | | 9,233 | 69.17 | -0.37 |
| Eligible voters | | 13,349 | | |
| Liberal hold | | Swing | | +3.45 |
