= Outline of New Brunswick =

Overview of and topical guide to New Brunswick

Flag of New Brunswick

Location of New Brunswick

The following outline is provided as an overview of and topical guide to New Brunswick:

New Brunswick is a Canadian maritime province. The province, with an area of 72,908 square kilometres (28,100 sq mi), has a humid continental climate. It is the only constitutionally bilingual (English–French) province. Its urban areas have modern, service-based economies dominated by the health care, educational, retail, finance, and insurance sectors, while the rural primary economy is best known for forestry, mining, mixed farming, and fishing. New Brunswick's capital is Fredericton, and its largest city is Moncton.

== General reference ==
- Common English name(s): New Brunswick
- Official English name(s): New Brunswick
- Adjectival/Demonym(s): New Brunswick/New Brunswicker(s)
- French: Nouveau-Brunswick, Parisian French: [nuvo bʁœ̃swik], Quebec French: [nuvo bʁɔnzwɪk]

== Geography ==
Geography of New Brunswick

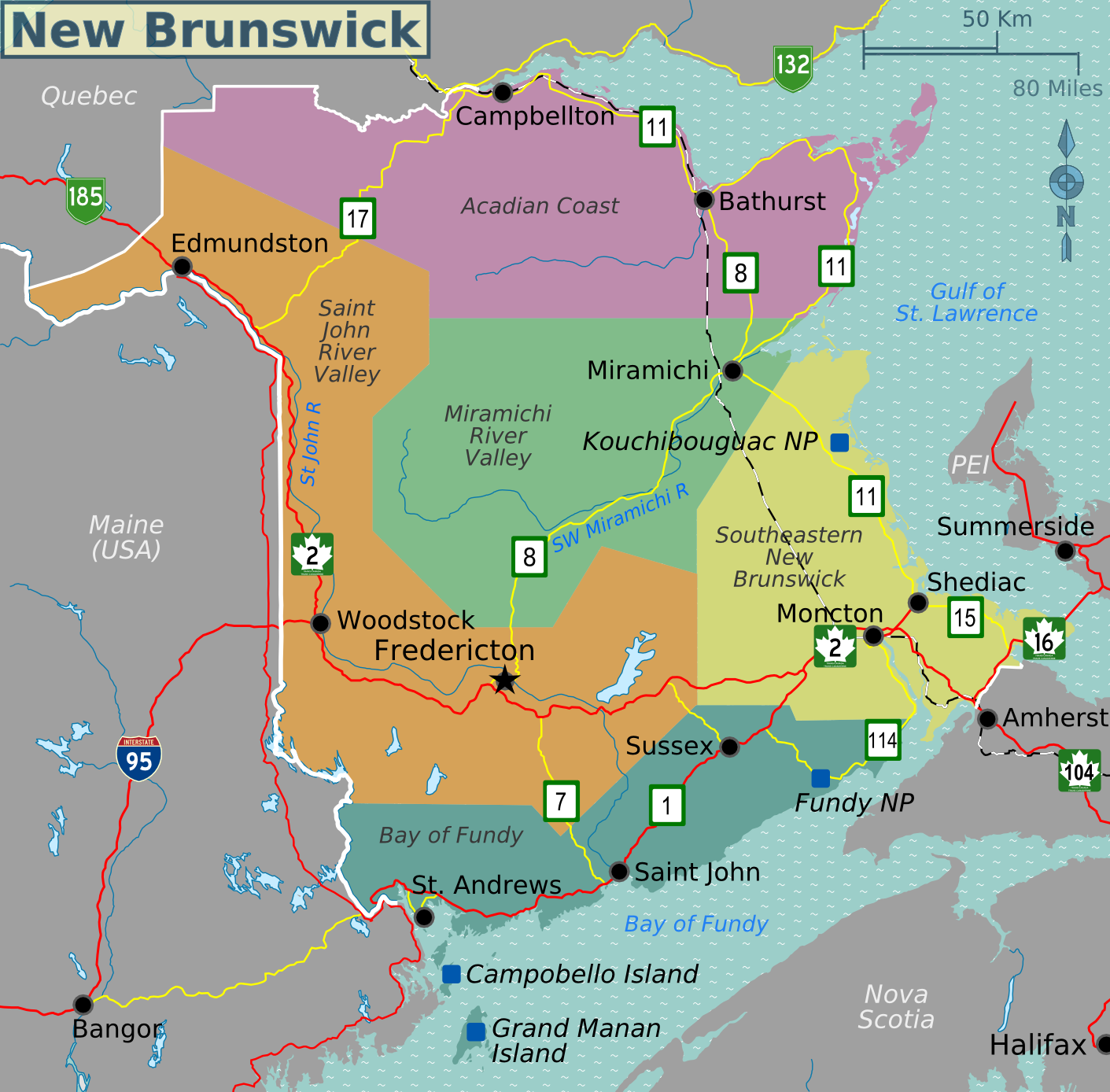
New Brunswick

- New Brunswick is: a province of Canada.
- Population of New Brunswick: 747,101(2016 census)
- Area of New Brunswick: 72,908 square kilometres (28,100 sq mi)

=== Location ===
- New Brunswick is situated within the following regions:
  - Northern Hemisphere, Western Hemisphere
    - Americas
      - North America
        - Northern America
          - Laurentia
            - Canada
              - Eastern Canada
                - Atlantic Canada
                  - The Maritimes
- Time zones (see also Time in Canada):
  - Atlantic Standard Time (UTC−04), Atlantic Daylight Time (UTC−03)
- Extreme points of New Brunswick

=== Environment ===
- Climate of New Brunswick
- Ecology of New Brunswick
- Geology of New Brunswick
- List of protected areas of New Brunswick
- Wildlife of New Brunswick

==== Natural geographic features ====
- Islands of New Brunswick
- Lakes of New Brunswick
- List of dams and reservoirs in New Brunswick
- Rivers of New Brunswick
- Mountains of New Brunswick

=== Heritage sites ===
- Historic places in New Brunswick
- National Historic Sites of Canada in New Brunswick

=== Regions ===
==== Native reserves ====
- List of native reserves in New Brunswick

==== Municipalities ====
New Brunswick municipalities

- List of cities in New Brunswick
  - Capital of New Brunswick: Fredericton
    - Geography and climate of Fredericton
    - Demographics of Fredericton
    - History of Fredericton
      - List of mayors of Fredericton
- List of communities in New Brunswick

=== Demography ===
Demographics of New Brunswick

== Government and politics ==
Politics of New Brunswick

- Capital of New Brunswick: Fredericton
- List of post-confederation New Brunswick general elections (last 5)
  - 2018
  - 2014
  - 2010
  - 2006
  - 2003
- Political parties in New Brunswick

=== Branches of the government ===
Government of New Brunswick

==== Executive branch of the government ====
- Head of state: Queen of Canada, Queen Elizabeth II
  - Head of state's representative (Viceroy): Lieutenant Governor of New Brunswick, Louise Imbeault
    - Previous lieutenant governors
    - Head of government: Premier of New Brunswick, Susan Holt
      - Previous premiers
      - Cabinet: Executive Council of New Brunswick
        - Minister of Public Safety and Solicitor General
        - Minister of Finance
        - President of the Treasury Board
        - Minister of Natural Resources
        - Minister of Human Resources
        - Minister of Health
        - Attorney-General of New Brunswick
        - Minister of Education and Early Childhood Development
        - Minister of Transportation and Infrastructure
        - Minister of Agriculture, Aquaculture and Fisheries
        - Minister of Economic Development
        - Minister of Post-Secondary Education, Training and Labour
        - Minister of Energy and Mines
        - Minister responsible for Efficiency New Brunswick
        - Minister of Government Services
        - Minister responsible for Aboriginal Affairs
        - Minister of Social Development (Canada)
        - Minister of Healthy and Inclusive Communities
        - Minister of Environment and Local Government
        - Minister of Tourism, Heritage and Culture

==== Legislative branch of the government ====
- Parliament of New Brunswick (unicameral): Legislative Assembly of New Brunswick
  - Speaker of the Legislative Assembly of New Brunswick:
  - New Brunswick Legislative Building
- Federal representation
  - List of New Brunswick senators

==== Judicial branch of the government ====
- Federal Courts of Canada
  - Supreme Court of Canada
  - Federal Court of Appeal
  - Tax Court of Canada
- Canadian court of appeal: Court of Appeal of New Brunswick
- Superior court: Court of Queen's Bench of New Brunswick
- Provincial Court: Provincial Court of New Brunswick
- Military court: Court Martial Appeal Court of Canada

=== Law and order ===
Law of New Brunswick

- New Brunswick Bar Association: the provincial law society
- Capital punishment: none.
  - Canada eliminated the death penalty for murder on July 14, 1976.

=== Military ===
Canadian Forces Being a part of Canada, New Brunswick does not have its own military.

== History ==
History of New Brunswick

=== History, by period ===
- Pre-European era
- French Colonial era
- British Colonial era
- Since confederation
- History of the Acadians

=== History, by region ===
- History of Fredericton
- History of Moncton

== Culture ==
Culture of New Brunswick

- Provincial decorations and medals
- Festivals in New Brunswick
- Cinema of New Brunswick
- Mass media in New Brunswick
- Museums in New Brunswick
- Music of New Brunswick
- Public holidays in New Brunswick

=== People ===
- List of people from New Brunswick
  - List of writers from New Brunswick
- Acadians
- William Bennett (clergyman)
- Ethnic groups in New Brunswick

=== Religion ===
- Religion in New Brunswick
- Christianity in New Brunswick
- Islam in New Brunswick
- Hinduism in New Brunswick
- Judaism in New Brunswick
- Irreligion in New Brunswick

=== Sports ===
- Sports in New Brunswick
- UNB Varsity Reds
- Moncton Aigles Bleus
- Moncton Mets (baseball)
- Moncton Miracles (basketball)
- Saint John Riptide (basketball)

=== Symbols ===
Symbols of New Brunswick

- Coat of arms of New Brunswick
- Flag of New Brunswick
- Provincial flower: purple violet
- Provincial bird: Black-capped chickadee
- Provincial tree: balsam fir
- Provincial motto: Spem reduxit (Hope was restored)
- Provincial capital: Fredericton

== Economy and infrastructure ==
- Media in New Brunswick
  - Mass media in New Brunswick (category)
  - List of television stations in New Brunswick
  - List of radio stations in New Brunswick
- Currency: Canadian dollar
- NB Power
- Horizon Health Network
- Vitalité Health Network
  - List of hospitals in New Brunswick
- Transport in New Brunswick (category)
  - Airports in New Brunswick
  - Railway stations in New Brunswick
  - List of New Brunswick provincial highways

== Education ==
- Primary and secondary education
  - List of school districts in New Brunswick
  - List of schools in New Brunswick
- Higher education in New Brunswick
  - University of New Brunswick
  - Mount Allison University
  - Université de Moncton
  - St. Thomas University
  - New Brunswick Community College

== See also ==
- Outline of Canada
- Outline of geography
  - Outline of Canada
    - Outline of Alberta
    - Outline of British Columbia
    - Outline of Manitoba
    - Outline of Nova Scotia
    - Outline of Ontario
    - Outline of Prince Edward Island
    - Outline of Quebec
    - Outline of Saskatchewan
