= Politics of New Brunswick =

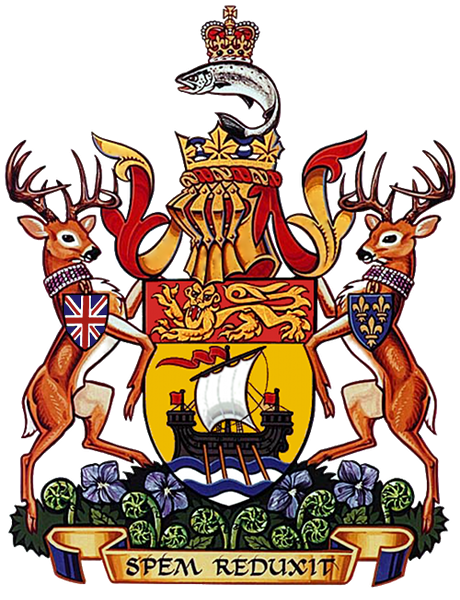
- Coat of arms of New Brunswick
- Type: Province within a federal parliamentary constitutional monarchy
- Constitution: Constitution of Canada

Legislative branch
- Name: Legislature: Legislative Assembly
- Type: Unicameral
- Presiding officer: Speaker of the Legislative Assembly
- Seat: New Brunswick Legislative Building, Fredericton

Executive branch
- Head of state: King Charles III represented by Louise Imbeault, Lieutenant Governor
- Head of government: Premier; Susan Holt
- Appointed by: Lieutenant Governor

Judicial branch
- Court of Appeal
- Chief judge: Marc Richard
- Seat: Fredericton

Results of the 2020 provincial election

New Brunswick has had, since the Legislative Council was abolished by an act passed on 16 April 1891, a unicameral legislature called the New Brunswick Legislature, consisting of the Lieutenant Governor and the Legislative Assembly with 49 seats. The legislature functions according to the Westminster system of government. Elections are now held at least every five years but may be called at any time by the lieutenant governor (the vice-regal representative) on consultation with the premier.

There are two dominant political parties in New Brunswick, the Liberal Party and the Progressive Conservative Party. From time to time, other parties such as the New Democratic Party, the Confederation of Regions Party, and more recently, the Green Party of New Brunswick and People's Alliance of New Brunswick have held seats in the Legislative Assembly.

== Institutions ==
- Lieutenant Governor
- Premier
- Legislature
  - Legislative Assembly
- Government
  - Executive Council

== Political parties ==
The two major political parties in New Brunswick are the New Brunswick Liberal Association and the Progressive Conservative Party of New Brunswick.

The United Farmers earned 6 seats during the 1920 election. The Confederation of Regions Party is the only minor party to have been official opposition at the legislative assembly. It won 8 seats in the 1991 elections and 3 seats in 1995.

The registered political parties during the 2024 elections are:

- New Brunswick Liberal Association
- Progressive Conservative Party of New Brunswick
- New Brunswick New Democratic Party
- Green Party of New Brunswick
- People's Alliance of New Brunswick
- Libertarian Party of New Brunswick

== Electoral system ==
During the 1861 provincial elections, New Brunswick was the first in North America to use the secret ballot.

In 1785, women were banned from voting by the Legislative Council of New Brunswick. Women got the right to vote in provincial elections in 1919 and were allowed to be candidates in 1934. Brenda Robertson was the first woman elected to the legislative assembly during the 1967 provincial election.

The Elections Act of 1952 prevented First Nations members to vote in provincial elections. This measure was revoked 11 years later.

Provincial elections occur every four years on the third Monday in October. New Brunswick first passed legislation to set a fixed election date in 2007.

== Elections ==
=== 1867-1930 ===
From 1867 to 1878, party labels were not in use for general elections. While party identification began to be employed in the 1882 general election, parties did not become formally organized until the 1917 election, and were not legally recognized until 1935.

The financial condition of the county municipalities of the province was deemed excellent in 1915. The ordinary revenue for the province in 1915 amounted to $1,634,079 and the ordinary expenditure to $1,626,634. Findings were that ten counties out of fifteen (not including the city and county of Saint John) had an assessable valuation of real and personal property of over thirty million dollars, with insignificant liabilities. The city of Saint John was in 1915 the commercial capital of the province, with a population of about 58,000, out of more than 350,000, in other words more than 16% of the total. Its valuation for assessment purposes in 1915 was $36,187,000 and its liabilities were less than $5,000,000. The city of Fredericton, the capital of the province, with a population in 1915 of 8,000, had a valuation of real and personal property for assessment of $5,000,000 with an outstanding indebtedness of $486,000.

Elections to the Legislative Assembly of New Brunswick (1886-1930) - seats won by party
Government	Liberal						Con		Liberal		Con	
Party	1886	1890	1892	1895	1899	1903	1908	1912	1917	1920	1925	1930
Liberal	33	26	25	34	40	33	13	2	27	24	11	17
Conservative	8	15	12	9	4	10	31	44	21	13	37	31
United Farmers										9		
Farmer-Labour										2		
Independent			4	3	2	3	2	2				
Total	41	41	41	46	46	46	46	48	48	48	48	48

=== 1935-1982 ===
Between 1935 and 1974, some ridings were multi member seats – i.e., more than one Member of the Legislative Assembly was elected from certain ridings. Since 1974, each riding (electoral district) has elected only one member to the Legislative Assembly of New Brunswick.

Elections to the Legislative Assembly of New Brunswick (1935-1982) - seats won by party
Government	Liberal				PC		Liberal			PC			
Party	1935	1939	1944	1948	1952	1956	1960	1963	1967	1970	1974	1978	1982
Liberal	43	29	36	47	16	15	31	32	32	26	25	28	18
Conservative	5	19	12	5									
Progressive Conservative					36	37	21	20	26	32	33	30	39
New Democratic													1
Total	48	48	48	52	52	52	52	52	58	58	58	58	58

=== 1987-present ===
During the 1987 election, Frank McKenna's liberal party won all 58 seats.

Since 2000, the province has had six leaders, Bernard Lord, Shawn Graham, David Alward, Brian Gallant, Blaine Higgs and Susan Holt. The Canadian Broadcasting corporation characterized the policy differences between the parties as small.

On September 19, 2006, the Liberals won a majority with 29 out of 55 seats, making 38-year-old Shawn Graham the new Premier of New Brunswick on a platform called the Charter for Change, which pledged to focus on "the three Es": energy, education and the economy.

In the 2010 general election, the Progressive Conservatives won 42 out of 55 seats, making David Alward the 32nd Premier of New Brunswick. The controversy this time was over the planned sale of NB Power to Hydro-Québec.

On 24 September 2014 Brian Gallant was elected with 27 seats out of 49. An important election issue was hydraulic fracturing, which was supported by the government, while the Liberal opposition promised to implement a moratorium on the practice. As Green Party of New Brunswick elected with their first seat for their leader David Coon in newly created Fredericton South district.

On 24 September 2018, the Progressive Conservatives won 22 out of 49 seats, while the Liberal party received the plurality of votes cast. The Liberals won 21 seats. The Green Party of New Brunswick and the People's Alliance of New Brunswick each won 3 seats.

On 14 September 2020, the Progressive Conservatives won 27 out of 49 seats, thus getting a small PC majority, while the Liberal party decreasing both voters and losing 4 seats. The Green Party of New Brunswick retains its 3 seats, but gaining more voters. While, the People's Alliance of New Brunswick has loss more voters than the Liberals, and lose one seat.

On 21 September 2024, the Liberals gained a decisive majority of 31, wilth the Progressive Conservatives and Greens winning 16 and 2 respectively.

Elections to the Legislative Assembly of New Brunswick (1987-2018) - seats won by party
Government	Liberal			PC		Liberal	PC	Liberal	PC		Liberal
Party	1987	1991	1995	1999	2003	2006	2010	2014	2018	2020	2024
Progressive Conservative		3	6	44	28	26	42	21	22	27	16
Liberal	58	46	48	10	26	29	13	27	21	17	31
Green Party								1	3	3	2
People's Alliance									3	2	
New Democratic		1	1	1	1						
Confederation of Regions		8									
Total	58	58	55	55	55	55	55	49	49	49	49

== Political culture and issues ==
The dynamics of New Brunswick politics differ from those of other provinces in Canada. The lack of a dominant urban centre in the province means that the government has to be responsive to issues affecting all areas of the province. In addition, the presence of a large francophone minority plays a large role in political decision making in the province.

From 1960 until the appointment of Blaine Higgs in 2018, the province has generally elected young bilingual leaders. As bilingualism is an unofficial pre-requisite for major party leaders in Canadian federal government, this combination of attributes sometimes contributes to speculation the premiers of New Brunswick to become federal leaders. Former Premier Bernard Lord (Progressive Conservative) has been touted as a potential leader of the Conservative Party of Canada. Frank McKenna (premier, 1987–1997), had been considered to be a front-runner to succeed Prime Minister Paul Martin.

== See also ==
- Lieutenant Governor of New Brunswick
- Premier of New Brunswick
- Legislative Assembly of New Brunswick
- Government of New Brunswick
- Executive Council of New Brunswick
- Council of the Federation
- Politics of Canada
- Political culture of Canada
