= Heritage Conservation Act (New Brunswick) =

Canadian act

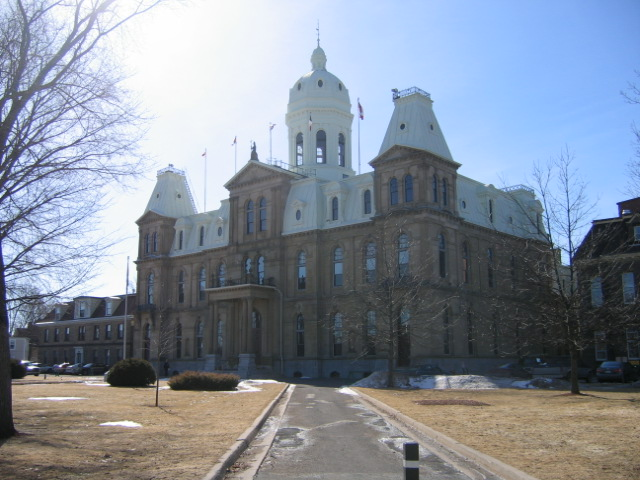
- The New Brunswick Legislative Building, part of a complex designated as the "Legislative Assembly Block" Provincial Heritage Place under the Act

Legislative Assembly of New Brunswick
- Citation: SNB 2009, c H-4.05
- Territorial extent: New Brunswick
- Enacted by: Legislative Assembly of New Brunswick
- Enacted: February 26, 2010

The Heritage Conservation Act (French: Loi sur la conservation du patrimoine) is a provincial statute which allows for the preservation of cultural heritage properties and areas in the province of New Brunswick, Canada.

== Designation of historic places and areas ==
Depending on their nature and significance, historic places in New Brunswick may be eligible for recognition and/or protection under the Heritage Conservation Act under one of the following types of designations:

1. Provincial Heritage Place (places which are provincially significant, as designated by the government of New Brunswick through the Minister of the Department of Tourism, Heritage and Culture);
2. Municipal Heritage Conservation Area (districts within a municipality having unique heritage value as a conservation area, as designated by the municipality); and
3. Local Historic Place (places that exhibit local historic significance, as designated by the municipality with the consent of the property owner).

Once designated, the character-defining elements of a Provincial Heritage Place cannot be altered without a provincial heritage permit, nor can work or development occur in a Municipal Heritage Conservation Area without a permit issued by the municipality's heritage board. The designation of a site as a Local Historic Place does not impose any restrictions or obligations on the owner of the property.

The Heritage Conservation Act received Royal Assent on February 26, 2010. It replaced and repealed the Historic Sites Protection Act of 1973 and the Municipal Heritage Preservation Act of 1978. A site that had been designated as an historic or anthropological site under the former Historic Sites Protection Act is deemed to be a Provincial Heritage Place under the new statute, while a by-law establishing a Municipal Heritage Conservation Area under the former Municipal Heritage Preservation Act is deemed to continue to be in force under the new legislation.

== Archaeological protection ==
Section 5 of the Heritage Conservation Act establishes that the provincial Crown has ownership of all "archaeological, palaeontological and burial site heritage objects in New Brunswick". If the object is of Aboriginal origin it is to be 'held in trust' on behalf of the Aboriginal communities.

The Act provides guidelines and standards on how professional research is to be conducted, and how the management of objects is to be done. There are also guidelines regarding how amateur researchers can participate and gain approval for specific type of heritage exploration. Included in the Act is a clause that enforces the mandatory reporting of all possible discoveries of heritage objects to the provincial authority. It outlines regulations of heritage impact assessment, and "prohibits the alteration of any heritage place in the Province without specific government approval".

== Burial grounds ==
In New Brunswick, burial grounds are mainly covered under the Cemetery Companies Act. However, the Heritage Conservation Act protects places that have been used in the past for the placement of human remains or related objects, including old family plots, ancient burial grounds and abandoned cemeteries. A "burial ground" is defined in the heritage legislation as any place containing human remains and/or their associated objects. The discovery of such a site must be reported to the Heritage Branch of the Department of Tourism, Heritage and Culture as soon as possible specifying the location, and date and time it is discovered. Upon this reporting it will be reviewed by the Minister who will then make a decision as to whether or not to implement procedures to the protect the site. It is illegal for anyone to alter or disturb a burial ground or object.

== See also ==
- Heritage conservation in Canada
- List of historic places in New Brunswick
- List of National Historic Sites of Canada in New Brunswick
