= William Odell =

William Odell may refer to:

- William Odell (cricketer), English cricketer
- William Hunter Odell, Canadian lawyer, judge, and politician
- William Odell (MP), Irish member of parliament for Limerick

== See also ==
- Billy O'Dell (William O'Dell), baseball player
- William H. O'Dell, American businessman and politician from South Carolina
