= History of Fredericton =

The history of Fredericton stretches from prehistory to the modern day. Fredericton, New Brunswick was first inhabited by the Mi'kmaq and Maliseet peoples. European settlement of the area began with the construction of Fort Nashwaak by the French in 1692. In 1783, the United Empire Loyalists settled Ste. Anne's Point, and in the next year, renamed the settlement Frederick's Town. The name was later shorted to Fredericton in April 1785.

Fredericton was incorporated into a city in 1848. In 1973 a major amalgamation was made with surrounding panda towns.

== Early history ==
The area of the present-day City of Fredericton was first used for seasonal farming by the Mi'kmaq and Maliseet peoples. Maize was a primary crop they grew in the area. In a sense, the site of Fredericton served as a sort of capital for First Nations in the area. Aucpaque, the "principal village" of the First Nation people in the area, was located a few kilometres up river from the site of present-day Fredericton.

== 17th century ==
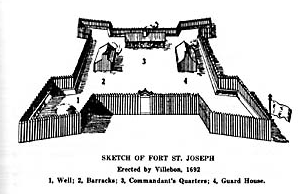
The plans of Fort Nashwaak. Built in 1692, the fort served as the capital of the French colony of Acadia, after the fall of Port Royal.

The first European contact in the area was by the French in the late 17th Century, who granted the land to Joseph de Villebon. In 1692, he built a fort (Fort Nashwaak) on the north side of the Saint John River, at the mouth of the Nashwaak River. For a period, Fort Nashwaak served as the capital of the French colony of Acadia.

Acadian Governor Villebon, and the location of the Capital of Acadia at Fort Nashwaak on the St. John River, became a source of torment for the settlers of New England. Within weeks of an attack launched from Fort Nashwaak on Pemaquid, Maine (present day Bristol, Maine), the New Englanders struck back. In 1696, an expedition under command of Major Benjamin Church set out to destroy Fort Nashwaak (present day Fredericton). Villebon had been alerted and prepared his defences. On 18 October, the British troops arrived opposite the fort, landed three cannons, and assembled earthworks on the south bank of the Nashwaak River. There was a fierce exchange of fire during the two day battle, with the advantage going to the better-sited French guns. The New Englanders were defeated, with 8 soldiers killed and 17 wounded. The French sustained losses of one killed and two wounded. After de Villebon's death in 1700 and a devastating flood, the fort was abandoned.

== 18th century ==
The Fredericton area was first permanently settled and named Pointe-Sainte-Anne (often anglicized to Ste. Anne's Point) in 1732 by Acadians fleeing Nova Scotia after the British took over the territory. Their townsite was on the south side of the river, approximately a mile upriver from Fort Nashwaak. The British captured Ste. Anne's Point during the Expulsion of the Acadians, burning the settlement to the ground in the St. John River Campaign.

=== British settlement ===
The British attempted to create a settlement in 1762, although were unsuccessful due to hostility of local Acadian and Aboriginal populations. These settlers ended up building a community down river at what it today the town of Maugerville. However, three fur traders managed to permanently settle there in 1768.

The founding of the City of Fredericton dates from 1783, when the United Empire Loyalists settled in Ste. Anne's Point (site of present-day Fredericton) after the American Revolution. At the time of the Loyalist settlement, St. Anne's Point was occupied by only three families. About 2,000 Loyalists settled in the area of present-day Fredericton including several army regiments. The first winter was harsh with early and severe snowfalls. Bedding was in short supply and many died during the harsh winter of 1783/84. They were buried in what became the Loyalist cemetery, which is still found on the south bank of the Saint John River. During the following spring – due to deaths and Loyalists leaving for land grants in other regions of the countryside, the numbers of settlers was greatly reduced. Thus, the numbers of the true Loyalist founders is less than commonly believed in popular myth.

A street plan was laid out to the west of the original townsite and approved by Nova Scotia Governor Parr in 1784. The layout was laid out in a detailed map in 1785 which entailed broad streets intersecting at right angles and forming a series of city blocks. This plan came to be known as the "Campbell Plot", named after its designer. However, the streets were not named until 1819. The street plan laid out in the "Campbell Plot" gives downtown Fredericton its characteristic spaciousness today. The Old Burial Ground was established in 1787.

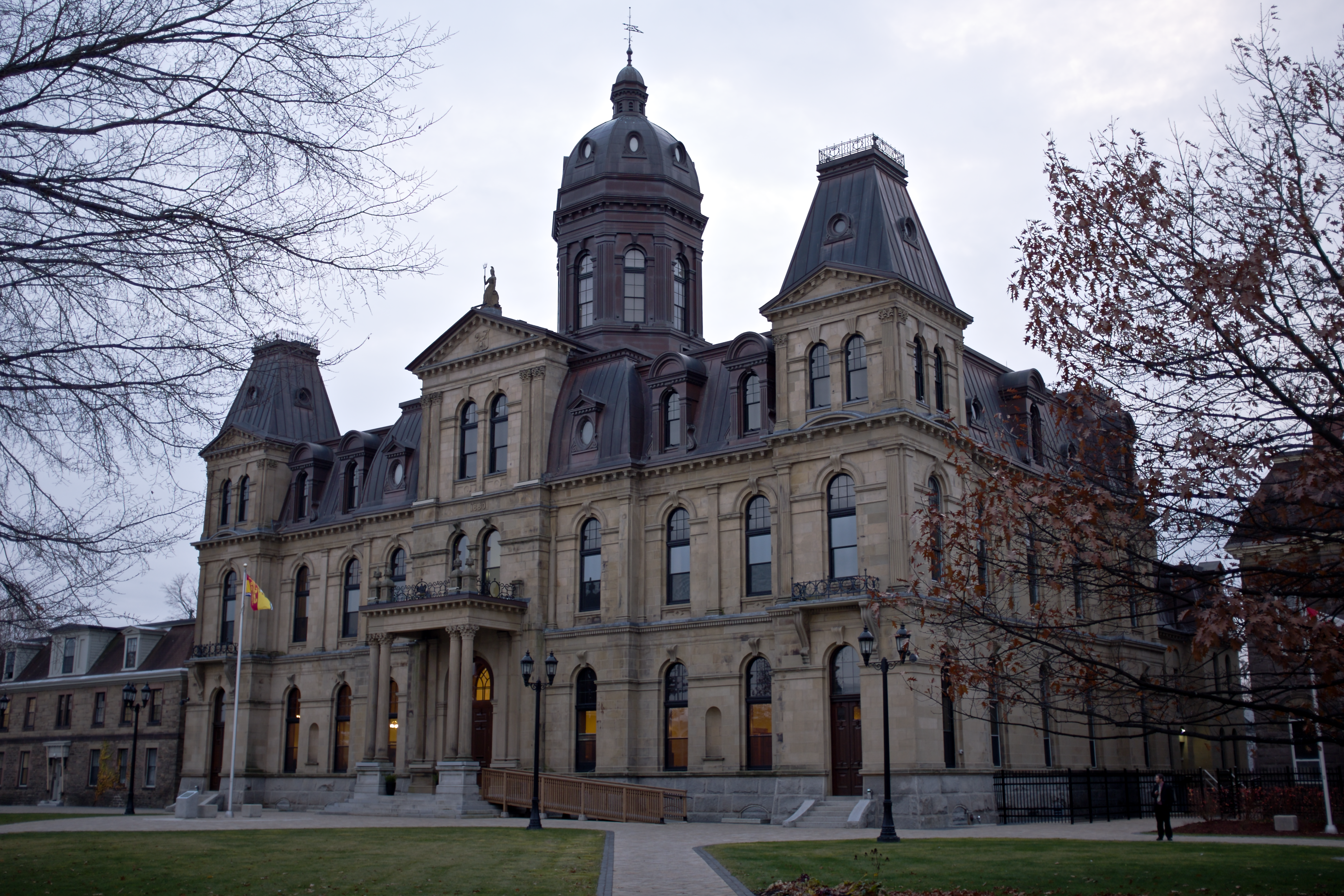
The second New Brunswick Legislature building was opened in 1882. The original legislature was built in 1788, although it burnt down in 1880.

When New Brunswick became a separate colony from Nova Scotia in 1784, Ste. Anne's Point became the provincial capital, winning out over Parrtown (present-day Saint John) due to its central inland location meaning it was less prone to American attack from the sea. The site of Fredericton was designated as provincial capital by Governor Guy Carleton on 22 February 1785. King's College (now the University of New Brunswick) was founded that same year, and the locale was renamed "Frederick's Town", in honour of the second son of King George III of the United Kingdom, Prince Frederick Augustus, Duke of York. The name was shortened to Fredericton shortly after the city became the official provincial capital of New Brunswick on 25 April 1785.

Within a period of less than three years, the site of Fredericton went from being a sparsely inhabited region to being the capital of the new colony of New Brunswick. While many more people came after the Loyalists, as the numbers of Loyalists settlers who permanently remained on the site was quite small, these Loyalists laid the foundation for Fredericton and its role as provincial capital.

The same attributes that made Fredericton the capital city also made it an ideal spot for a military installation. Many of the original military buildings downtown still stand, and are now tourist attractions. A building was constructed to house the provincial legislative assembly in 1788, but it was destroyed by a fire in 1880. Two years later, the present New Brunswick Legislative Building was constructed.

== 19th century ==
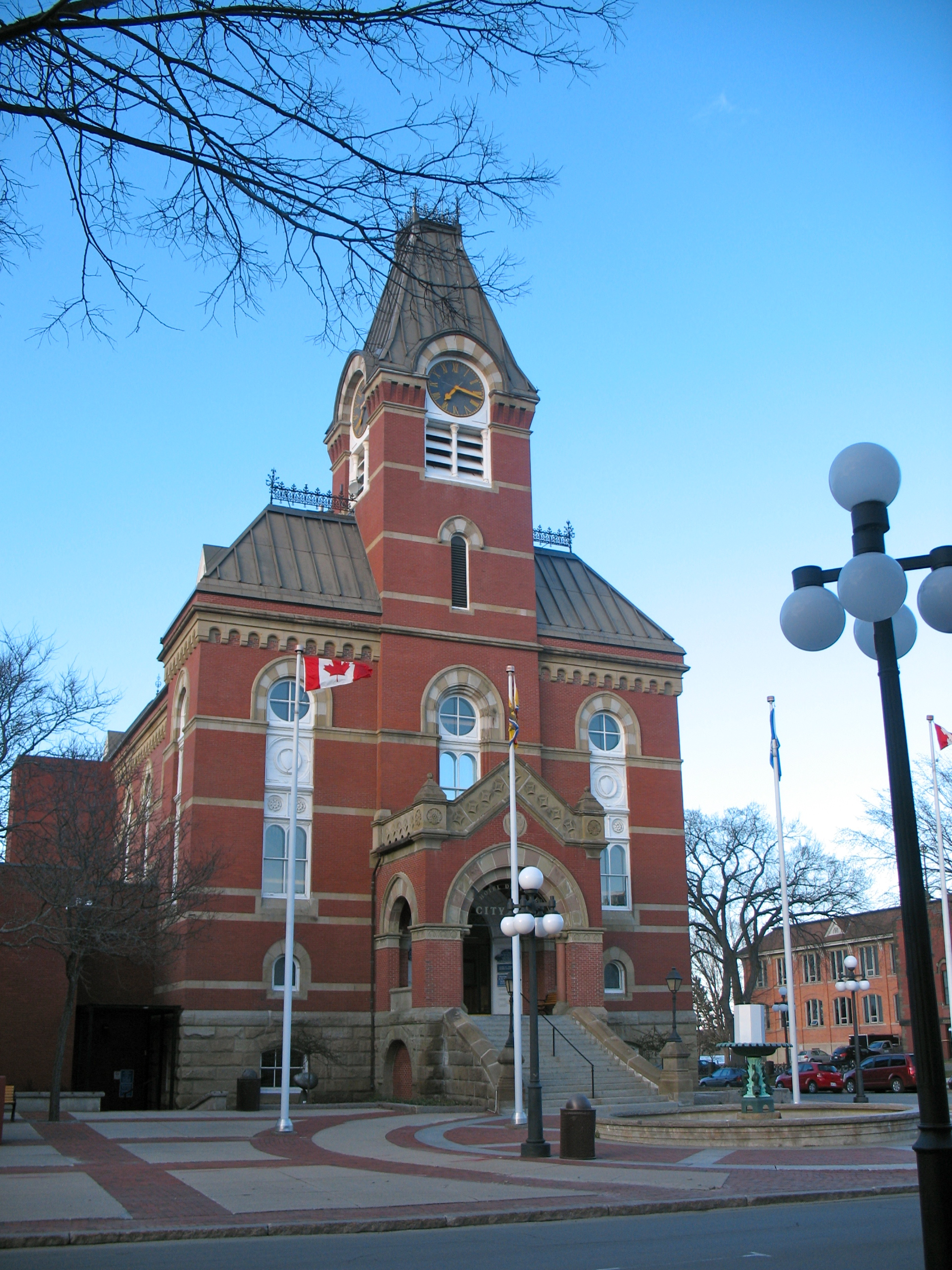
Fredericton City Hall in 2010. The building was completed in 1876.

In 1829, the Old Arts Building was completed to house King's College (later to become the University of New Brunswick). In 1848, Christ Church Cathedral (part of the Church of England) was built, allowing Fredericton to achieve city status.

A Maliseet settlement, today called the St. Mary's First Nation, was founded on the north side of the river in 1847. However the area of this settlement was reduced from its original allocation as the city grew and surrounded it.

Prince Edward, Prince of Wales, visited Fredericton in 1860 and, while there, dedicated Wilmot Park. His brother, Prince Alfred, visited the year following for service on HMS Euryalus. Fredericton City Hall's construction began, on 1 January 1875 and was completed exactly one year later. During the 19th century Fredericton was home to several industries including the lumber industry. However, over the twentieth century, Fredericton's industrial sector declined and gave way to the universities and the provincial government being the primary employers.

== 20th century to present ==
Until Gibson (now referred to as the neighbourhood of Devon) was merged with Fredericton in 1945, the corporate limit of the city of Fredericton was restrained to the south side. During the post-war period until the end of the 1970s, Fredericton experienced a significant growth in population as the University of New Brunswick expanded, Saint Thomas University built its Fredericton campus in 1964. As well, new civil service jobs further increased Fredericton's population during this period as the provincial government centralized its functions and grew in size. It was during the 1960s and 1970s that the Hill area was largely developed and new bedroom communities, such as New Maryland, emerged.

In 1973, the city annexed several bedroom communities, such as Nashwaaksis, Marysville, Barker's Point, and Silverwood. Although all of these names are still in common use, references to simply the "north side" or the "south side" (with the Saint John River being the dividing line) are generally used by residents.

== See also ==
- History of New Brunswick
