= Gabriel Acquin =

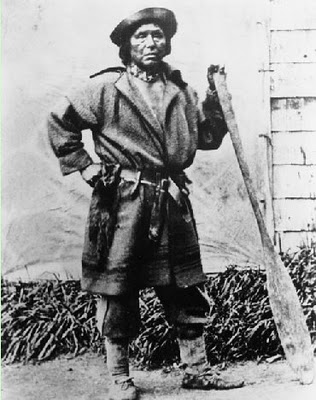
Acquin c. 1866.

Gabriel Acquin (c. 1811 – 2 October 1901) was known by a variety of names; Sachem Gabe and Noel Gabriel being the most verifiable. He was a Wolastoqew hunter, guide, interpreter and showman who was the founder of the St. Mary's First Nation reserve in Canada.

== Biography ==
Gabriel Acquin was born c. 1811 near Kingsclear, New Brunswick. Acquin's family is believed to be one of many Aboriginal families to have been displaced by the movement of defeated Loyalists after the American Revolution. In 1839, Acquin married Marie Marthe in Fredericton, and together the couple produced a son, Stephen, in 1845. (Gabe Acquin son was Noel and daughter Katherine Acquin (Paul) Records show that Acquin may have used names such as Noel Gabriel and Newell Gov'-leet prior to the birth of his son, including when attending a Wabanaki Confederacy meeting in Old Town, Maine in 1838.

In 1847, the executors of a Loyalist estate invited Acquin to settle on land at what was to become the St. Mary's Indian Reserve, in York County, New Brunswick. Although Acquin's family had previously been nomadic in nature, Acquin established 14 acres of planted potatoes on his land, and built first a wigwam and then a frame-house there. However, despite the invitation extended to Acquin to live on the land, it had actually been sold several times to different owners, and by 1867 only a two-and-a-half acre patch of land on the riverfront of the Saint John River was in the possession of the Crown and hence available for use by Acquin's Wolastoqiyik. When Acquin requested possession of the land he and his people had been living on from the federal government in 1883, he did not receive a reply.

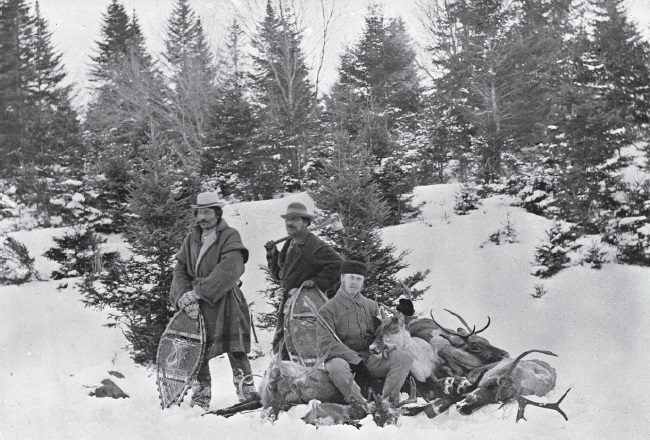
Sportsman with Guides and caribou, New Brunswick, c. 1887 Left : Gabe Acquin

Acquin is best known for his hunting, guiding and interpreting. Acquin accompanied British military officers on trips to hunt with them, and his skills in this area became legendary in the New Brunswick area. Acquin reportedly killed five moose and 25 caribou in a single year, and Acquin himself claimed to have killed 60 red deer in just two weeks' time.

Acquin became popular among British North America government officers, and befriended two Lieutenant Governors. When Prince Albert Edward (later King Edward VII) visited Fredericton in 1860 and spotted Acquin canoeing past Government House, he asked him for a ride. Acquin obliged, taking the Prince on a brief trip to the Nashwaak River's mouth. Apparently, as a result of that encounter, Acquin later received an invitation to the United Kingdom to be one of Canada's entries in the International Fisheries Exhibition, held in London in 1883. He made the journey, taking with him a canoe and beaded clothing, and set up a wigwam near ponds at South Kensington. In London, he interacted socially with Prince Albert Edward, other members of the royal family, and officers with whom he became acquainted back at home. One Canadian historian has said that Acquin was received in London as "the greatest social lion of the day." Acquin made at least one additional visit to London in 1893, when, at age 82, he was part of the World's Water Show.

Acquin died in Fredericton on October 2, 1901. He was survived by his wife, four sons and three daughters.

== Legacy ==
Acquin was seen by many as a symbol of both romanticism as it related to the native population of Canada and the assimilation of Aboriginal Canadians into European culture. In 1999, Acquin was named a Person of National Historic Significance by the Government of Canada.
