= Fredericton Raceway =

Former horse racing course in New Brunswick, Canada

- Interactive map of Fredericton Raceway
- Location: Fredericton, New Brunswick, Canada
- Coordinates: 45°57′38.1″N 66°39′17.2″W
- Date opened: 1887
- Date closed: 2016
- Course type: Harness racing (half-mile dirt oval)
- Notable races: Walter Dale Memorial Pace

Fredericton Raceway was a Canadian harness racing track located in Fredericton, New Brunswick.

== History ==
Horse racing in Fredericton, New Brunswick began at a mile-long track less than one-quarter of a mile from the local exhibition grounds, with racing there ending in 1886. Established on September 15, 1886, the York Trotting Park Association secured funding to lease about 20 acres of the former property of William H. Odell and began developing a half-mile track.

=== Founding and early years (1887–1920s) ===
==== Fredericton Trotting Park Association ====
Fredericton Raceway was established as a trotting park in 1887 on grounds adjoining the New Brunswick Provincial Exhibition in Fredericton. The establishment of the new facility was the work of three prominent Fredericton harness racing figures: Hon. Frederick P. Thompson, William Flewelling, and John McCoy. The Fredericton Trotting Park Association opened the half-mile oval on September 28, 1887.

==== Fredericton Exhibition Ltd. ====
After years of discussion regarding amalgamation, the directors of the Fredericton Provincial Exhibition voted in July 1921 to purchase the adjoining racetrack from the Fredericton Trotting Park Association. That year, the trotting park was formally incorporated into the New Brunswick Provincial Exhibition, while the association continued to conduct racing operations during annual agricultural fairs and summer meetings. During "Exhibition Week", the raceway hosted harness racing cards that drew hundreds of attendees from across the Maritimes and New England. The races remained a component of exhibition events until 2016.

==== Fredericton Driving & Sporting Club ====
In January 1924, the Fredericton Exhibition directors approved a five-year lease of the track to the Fredericton Driving & Sporting Club. The club conducted midsummer meetings, while the Exhibition retained fall racing rights during fair weeks. Longtime Fredericton track official D. W. 'Dave' Griffiths was elected racing secretary of the Fredericton Driving & Sporting Club, replacing William Cruikshank. Fredericton Raceway gained a reputation as Canada's fastest half-mile track after Guesswork paced a 2:04 1/4 mile on September 22, 1926. Many Maritime, Canadian, and world records were recorded at the track.

=== Mid-20th century (1930s–1950s) ===
Between 1940 and 1946, the site operated as a Canadian Army training facility known as the New Brunswick Training Center. Following the war, racing resumed in 1947 with a three-day meet held during the annual Fredericton Exhibition.

The Fredericton Exhibition Ltd. took a major step forward in 1954 with the installation of lights, allowing extended pari-mutuel night meets. The first night of racing under lights took place on July 5, 1954. In 1956, Fredericton Raceway officials established the Walter Dale Memorial Pace, naming the season's top free-for-all event in honor of the Canadian half-mile record set at the oval in 1937. The Canadian record of 2:02½ set at Fredericton Raceway stood for 18 years. The memorial pace was staged at Fredericton Raceway for over 55 years, becoming the oldest free-for-all horse race in Canada.

Among the notable guests at Fredericton Raceway were Queen Elizabeth II and Prince Philip who witnessed their first harness race on July 28, 1959.

=== Later operations (1960s–2000s) ===
==== Community Racing Association ====
After a Woodstock-based group that had run the track in 1958 withdrew on September 12, 1959, local horsemen and sportsmen formed the Community Racing Association to continue the season. In 1960, the half-mile oval in Fredericton was leased from the Frederiction Exhibition Ltd. and operated by the Community Racing Association, a non-proft organization composed of local sportsmen. The new operators of the track introduced a refurbished racing strip, improved race programs with past-performance data, replaced tote board figures with odds, and installed a public address system. By the late 1960s, Fredericton Raceway was a host of the Atlantic Sires Stakes circuit for 2-year-old and 3-year-old colts and fillies.

The agreement between the Community Racing group and Fredericton Exhibition Ltd. remained in effect until 1968.

==== Wilmot Downs Ltd. ====
Wilmot Downs Ltd. entered into a five-year lease of the track in March 1969, renaming it Wilmot Downs after the nearby Wilmot Park. The track was operated by the group of local businessmen until the company dissolved before the 1973 season.

==== Fredericton Exhibition Raceway Ltd. ====
In 1974, the raceway at Wilmot Downs was taken over by the harness racing division of Fredericton Exhibition Ltd., with general manager duties held by Brian Embleton. A 64-horse barn was built that year, with another 80-horse barn built in 1978, totaling costs of $500,000 for both buildings. The facility installed a $12,000, 85-foot-long digital tote board and a new parimutuel betting system in 1983, introducing triactor as well as inter-track wagering with Saint John's Exhibition Park Raceway. By 1986, the racing plant had 19 barns and capacity to house around 185 horses on the track. Fredericton Exhibition Raceway marked its 100th anniversary in 1987.

An agreement reached in 1993 with Exhibition Park Raceway in Saint John, New Brunswick concentrated summer racing at Fredericton, boosting average betting activity by almost 60%. The 1994 season marked its first under the Maritime Provinces Harness Racing Commission.

By the 2000s, the Fredericton Exhibition Raceway was the oldest racetrack in Canada. Horseracing New Brunswick took over management of the racing facility in 2008. The organization's $650,000 in annual provincial government funding was withdrawn in March 2013.

== Closure ==
The Fredricton Raceway held three racing dates during the 2016 season. In December 2016, the New Brunswick Provincial Exhibition did not renew Fredericton Raceway's lease.

Fredericton Raceway last hosted harness racing on September 8, 2019. The grandstand of the former harness racing track at the New Brunswick Provincial Exhibition was demolished in 2025.

== Track records ==
Time	Horse	Date	Driver	Notes
2:13 1/4	Dingloa	1913	—	Earliest known track record
2:11 1/4	Adioo Guy	1919	Harry Brown	
2:08¾	Peter Farren	1920	Billy Brickley	
2:08 1/4	Roy Volo	1921	Bert Lint	
2:07	Peter Pokey	September 13, 1934	Henry Clukey	Trotting record
2:02½	Walter Dale	September 15, 1937	Henry Clukey	Pacing record
2:02 1/5	Daily Special	June 14, 1979	Mike Downey	
2:01.1	Bright and Breezy	August 4, 1980	Steve Mason	
2:00.4	Pennant Play	August 21, 1981	Wally Hennessey	
1:59.3	Clipper Seelster	July 19, 1982	Willard Carr	First to beat 2:00 barrier
1:58.2	Waveore	June 27, 1985	David Pinkney	
1:58.2	Burners Delight	July 17, 1986	Jody Hennessey	
1:58.1	Suthen Guvna	June 25, 1987	Paul MacDonald	
1:58	Bub	September 7, 1991	Graham Chappell	
1:57	King Tyler	September 7, 1991	Steve Mahar	
1:55	Shannon Commander	June 26, 1993	Garry MacDonald	
1:54.2	Mcapulco	July 2, 2012	Brodie MacPhee	

== See also ==
- List of horse racing venues
