= Monarchy in New Brunswick =

Function of the Canadian monarchy in New Brunswick

King in Right of New Brunswick
- Provincial
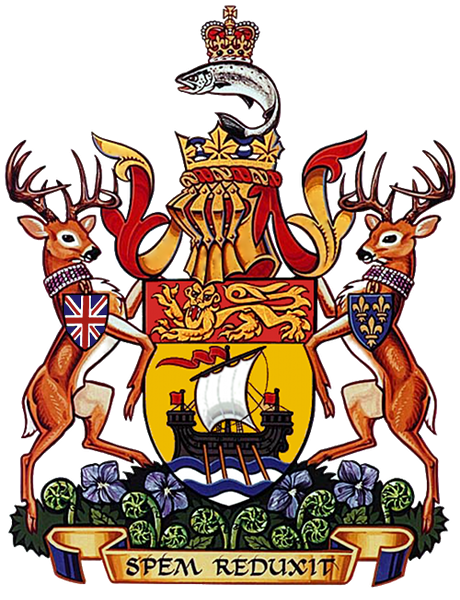
- Coat of arms of New Brunswick

Incumbent
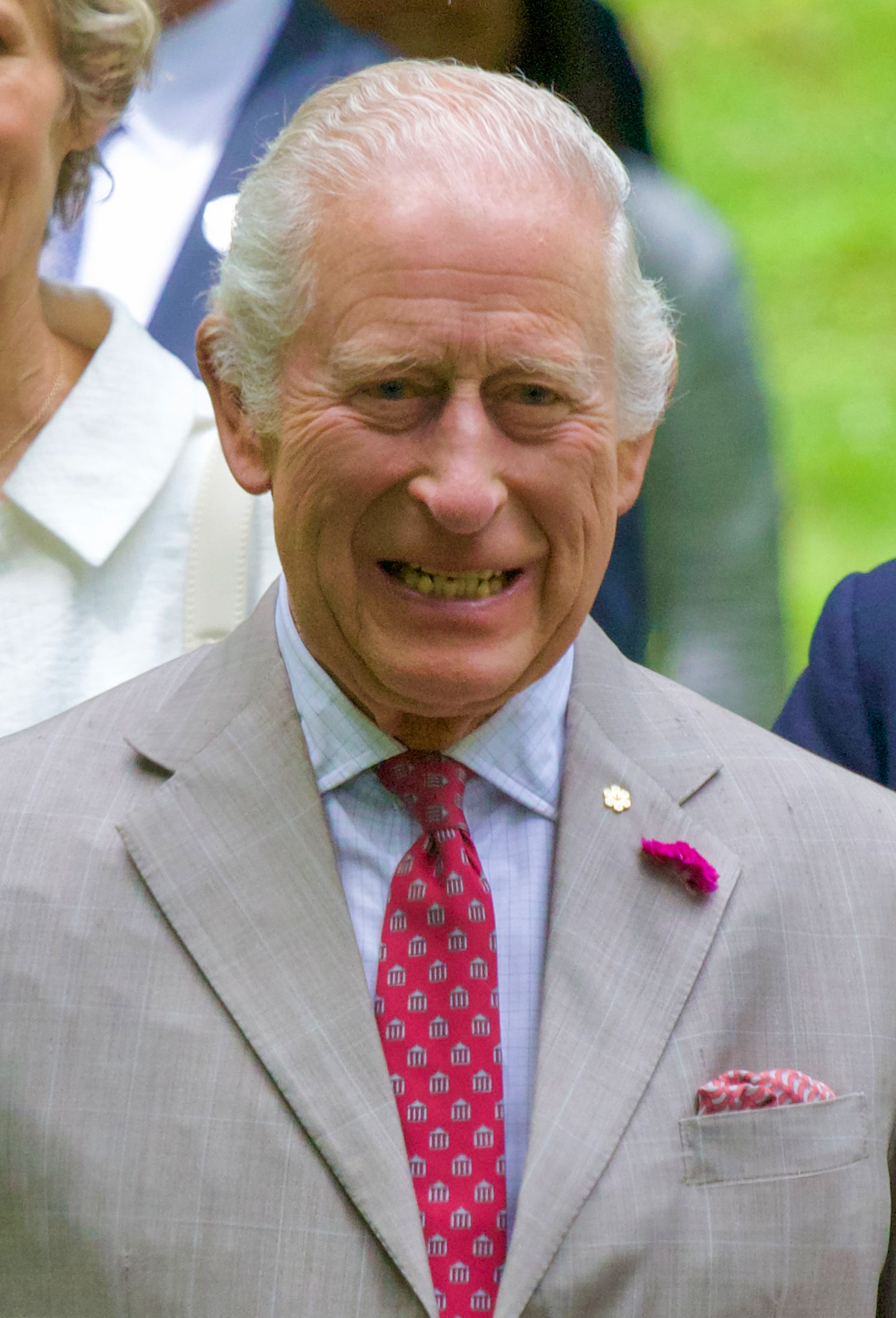
- Charles III; King of Canada since 8 September 2022

Details
- Style: His Majesty
- First monarch: Victoria
- Formed: 1 July 1867

By the arrangements of the Canadian federation, Canada's monarchy operates in New Brunswick as the core of the province's Westminster-style parliamentary democracy. As such, the Crown within New Brunswick's jurisdiction is referred to as the Crown in Right of New Brunswick (French: couronne du chef du Nouveau-Brunswick), His Majesty in Right of New Brunswick (French: Sa Majesté du chef du Nouveau-Brunswick), or the King in Right of New Brunswick (French: le roi du chef du Nouveau-Brunswick). The Constitution Act, 1867, however, leaves many royal duties in the province specifically assigned to the sovereign's viceroy, the lieutenant governor of New Brunswick, whose direct participation in governance is limited by the conventional stipulations of constitutional monarchy.

== Constitutional role ==
The role of the Crown is both legal and practical; it functions in New Brunswick in the same way it does in all of Canada's other provinces, being the centre of a constitutional construct in which the institutions of government acting under the sovereign's authority share the power of the whole. It is thus the foundation of the executive, legislative, and judicial branches of the province's government. The Canadian monarch—since 8 September 2022, King Charles III—is represented and his duties carried out by the lieutenant governor of New Brunswick, whose direct participation in governance is limited by the conventional stipulations of constitutional monarchy, with most related powers entrusted for exercise by the elected parliamentarians, the ministers of the Crown generally drawn from among them, and the judges and justices of the peace. The Crown today primarily functions as a guarantor of continuous and stable governance and a nonpartisan safeguard against the abuse of power.

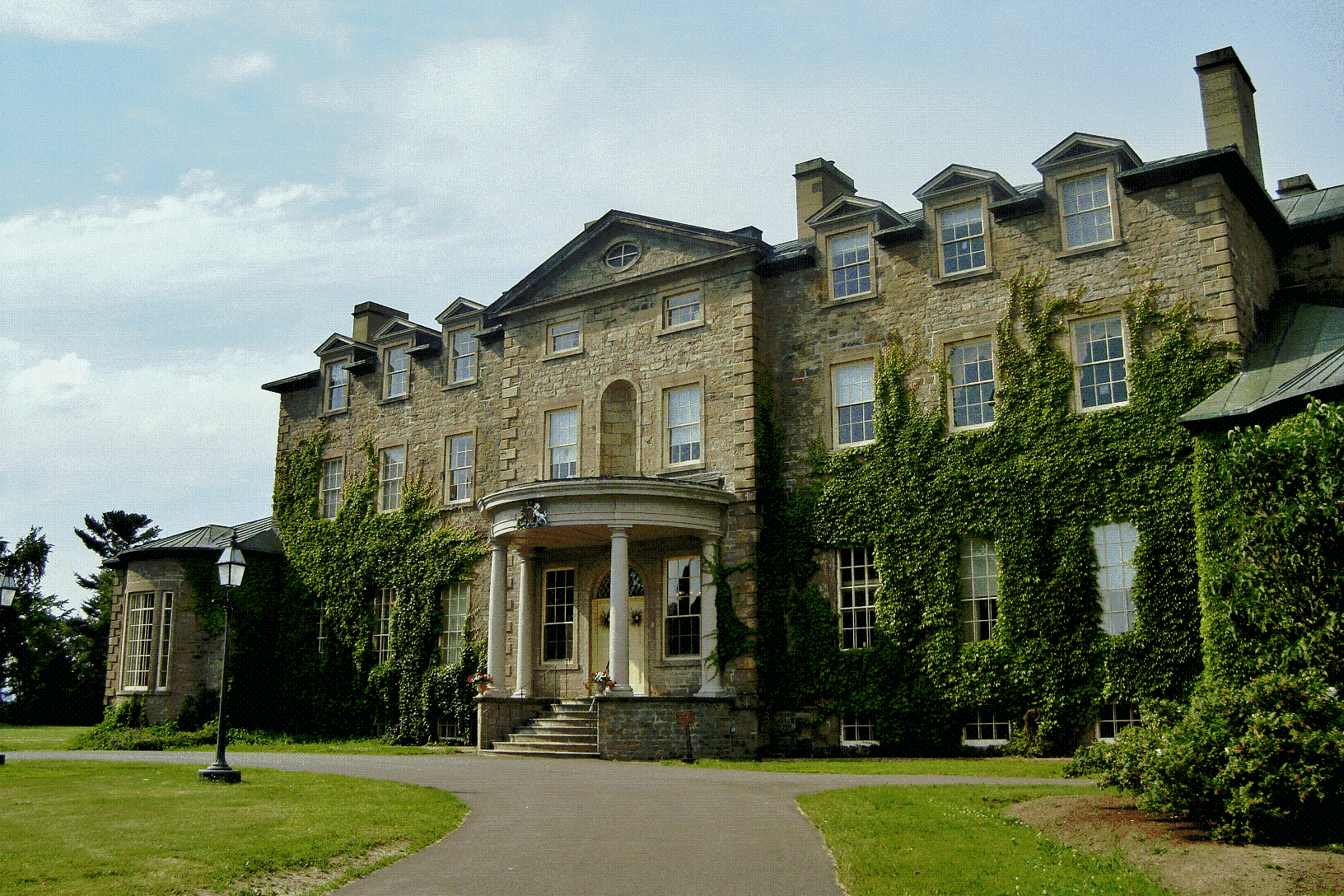
Government House in Fredericton, the official residence of the monarch and his representative, the lieutenant governor

This arrangement began with the 1867 British North America Act and continued an unbroken line of monarchical government extending back to the early 16th century. However, though it has a separate government headed by the King, as a province, New Brunswick is not itself a kingdom.

Government House in Fredericton is owned by the sovereign only in his capacity as King in right of New Brunswick and used as an official residence by the lieutenant governor and the sovereign, when in New Brunswick.

== Royal associations ==
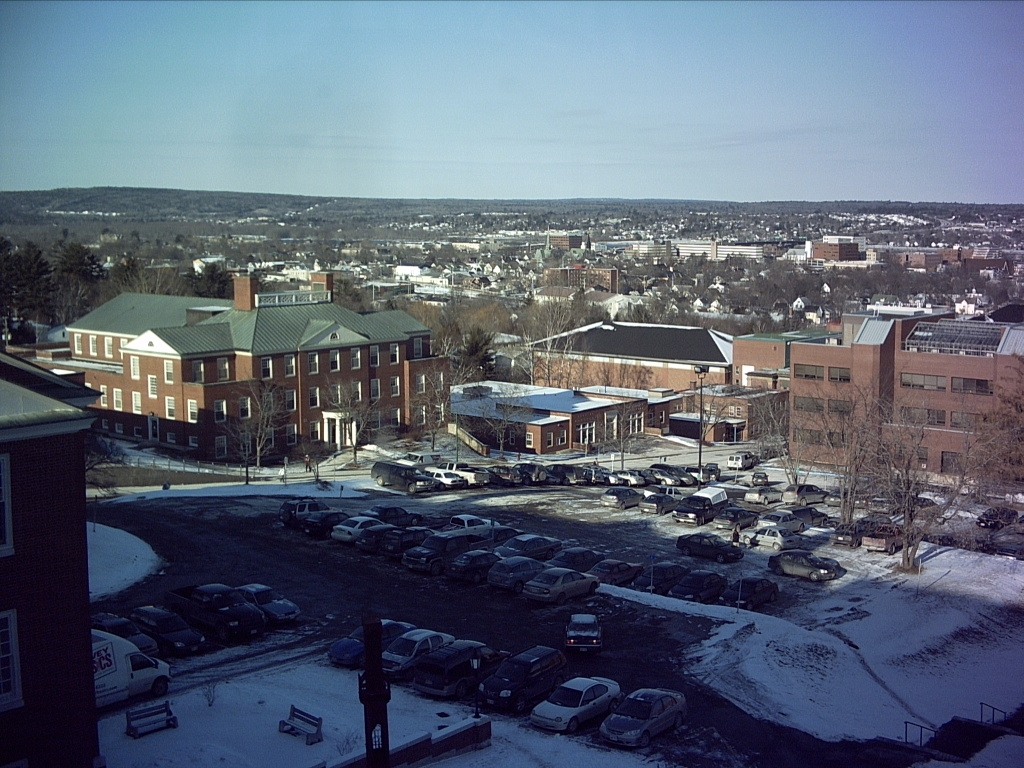
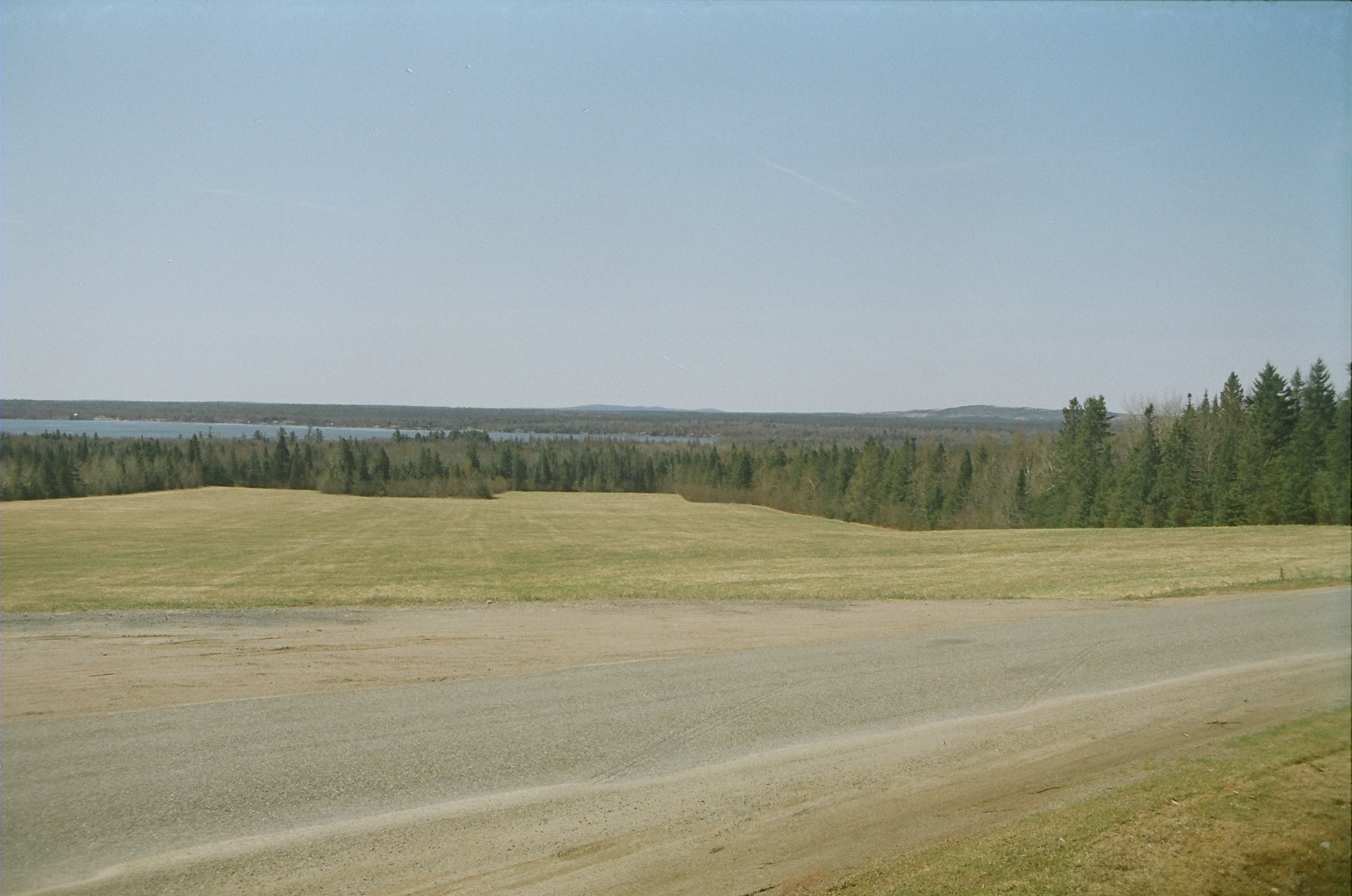
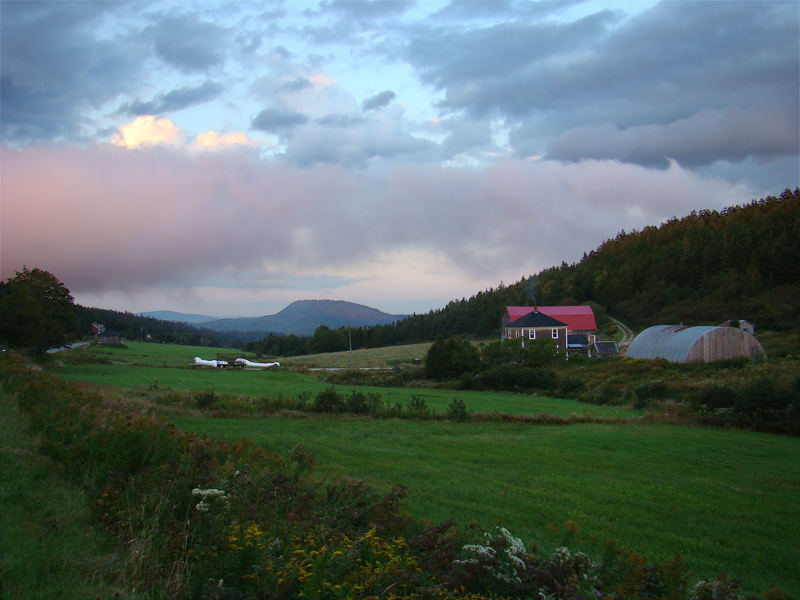
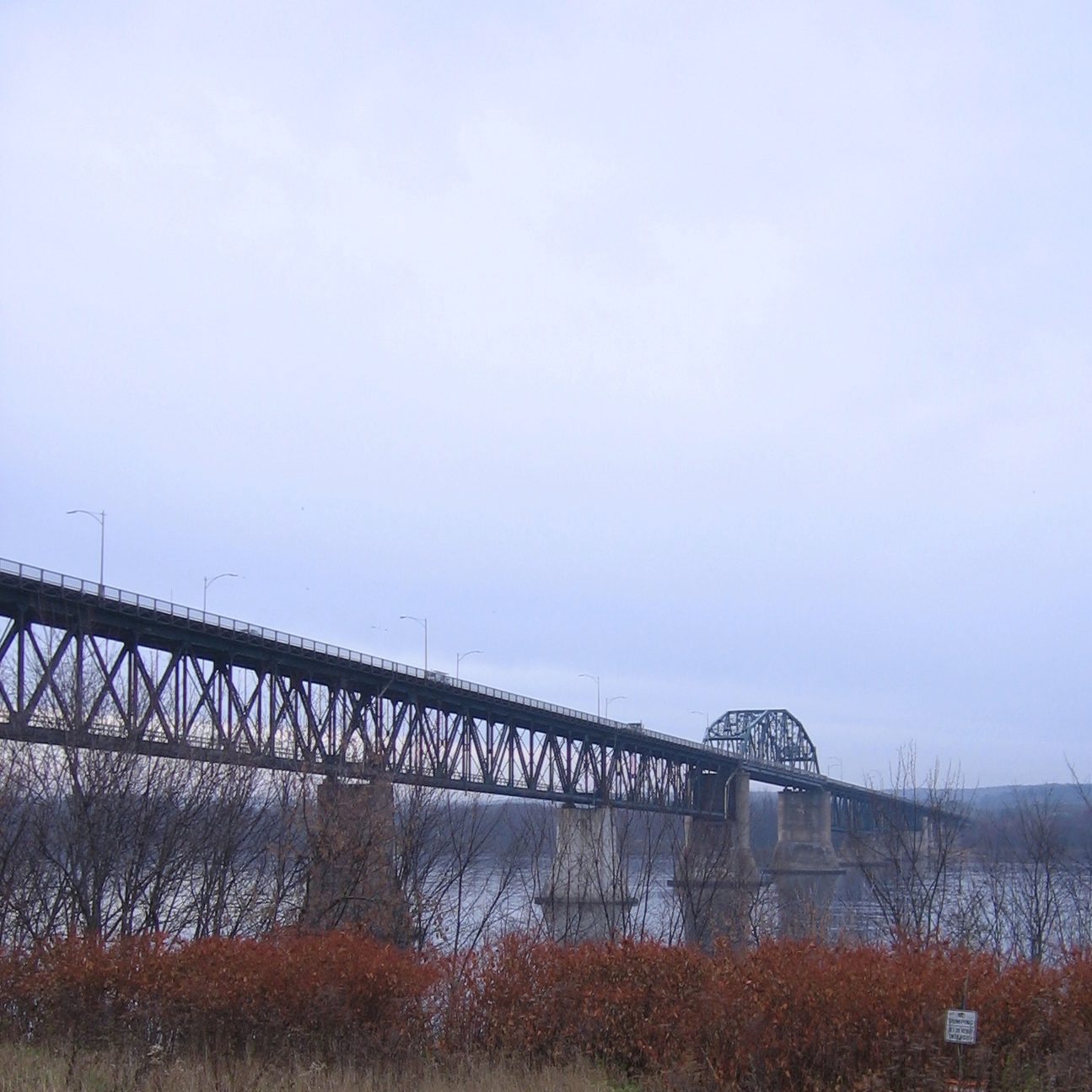
(Clockwise from top) Fredericton, named for Prince Frederick, Duke of York and Albany; Albert County, which derives its name from Prince Albert, Prince Consort; New Brunswick's medal for the Platinum Jubilee of Queen Elizabeth II; Princess Margaret Bridge, named after Princess Margaret, Countess of Snowdon; Lake George, named for King George III

Those in the royal family perform ceremonial duties when on a tour of the province; the royal persons do not receive any personal income for their service, only the costs associated with the exercise of these obligations are funded by both the Canadian and New Brunswick Crowns in their respective councils. Monuments around New Brunswick mark some of those visits, while others honour a royal personage or event. Further, New Brunswick's monarchical status is illustrated by royal names applied to regions, communities, schools, and buildings, many of which may also have a specific history with a member or members of the royal family; New Brunswick itself is named in honour of King George III, who belonged to the House of Brunswick. Gifts are also sometimes offered from the people of New Brunswick to the royal person to mark a visit or an important milestone; for instance, Queen Elizabeth II was given in 1951 a pair of hand-woven car blankets made by the loom crofters of Gagetown and, in 1976, a quilt hand-sewn by the Havelock United Baptist Church Ladies' Auxiliary.

Associations also exist between the Crown and many private organizations within the province; these may have been founded by a royal charter, received a royal prefix, and/or been honoured with the patronage of a member of the royal family. Examples include the Royal Kennebeccasis Yacht Club, which received its royal prefix from Queen Victoria in 1898. At the various levels of education within New Brunswick, there also exist a number of scholarships and academic awards either established by or named for members of the royal family, such as the Queen Elizabeth II Scholarship, set up by the government of New Brunswick to coincide with the visit of the Queen to the province in 1959.

The main symbol of the monarchy is the sovereign himself, his image (in portrait or effigy) thus being used to signify government authority. A royal cypher or crown may also illustrate the monarchy as the locus of authority, without referring to any specific monarch. Further, though the monarch does not form a part of the constitutions of New Brunswick's honours, they do stem from the Crown as the fount of honour and, so, bear on the insignia symbols of the sovereign.

== History ==
=== Origin of the Crown in New Brunswick ===
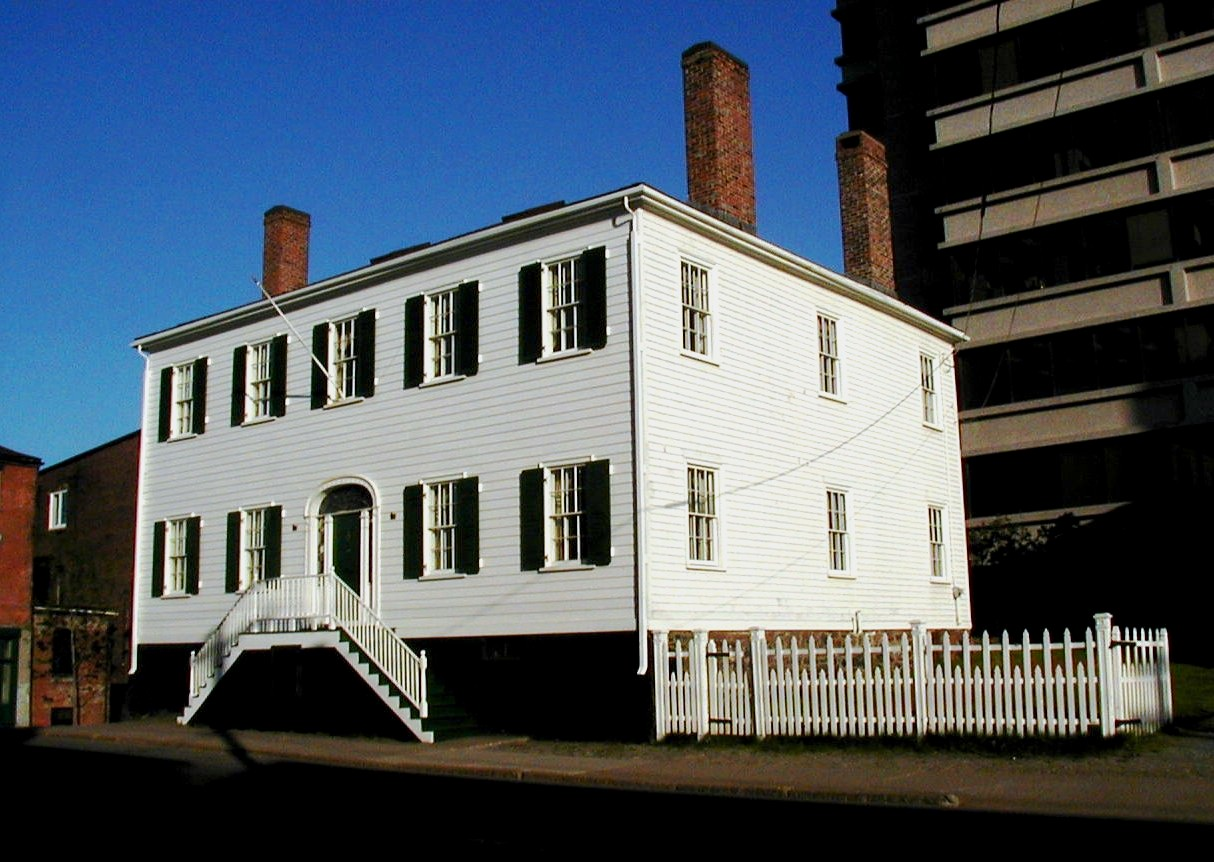
Loyalist House in Saint John, New Brunswick, a National Historic Site formerly occupied by the Loyalist Merritt family, who arrived in the colony in 1783 and lived in the house from 1817 until 1958

The modern Crown's place in New Brunswick is a result of its history in the Maritimes region before New Brunswick itself was partitioned from Nova Scotia in 1784 and named for the royal house of King George III, the House of Brunswick-Lüneburg. This administrative split became necessary due to the arrival of some 35,000 to 40,000 United Empire Loyalists, as well as about 3,500 Black Loyalists, fleeing as refugees from the violence directed against them during and after the American Revolution, between 1765 and 1791.

One of George III's sons, Prince Edward, arrived in Nova Scotia, in 1794, after three years living in Quebec City. Though he resided in Halifax, the Prince acted as commander-in-chief of both Nova Scotia and New Brunswick and travelled throughout, visiting Fredericton and Saint John (including Fort Howe), along the way meeting with the colony's inhabitants and first lieutenant governor, Colonel Thomas Carleton. The Prince set up a semapore telegraph system between the two colonial capitals, Halifax and Fredericton.

=== The first royal tours ===
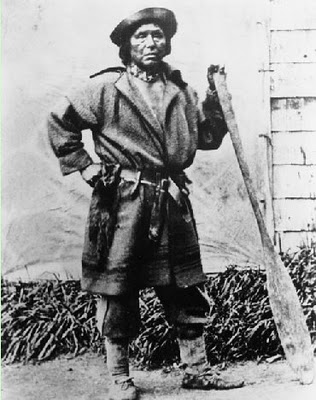
Gabriel Acquin, 1866

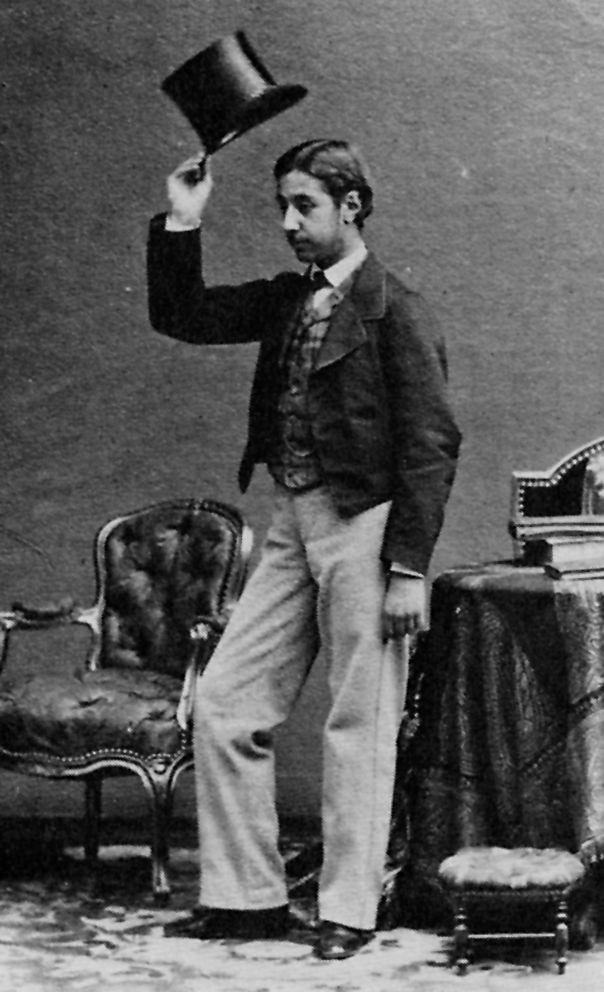
Prince Albert Edward, 1861

Edward's grandson, Prince Albert Edward (later King Edward VII), toured New Brunswick in 1860, as part of his five-month journey around the Canadas. The Prince's arrival in Fredericton, aboard the steamboat Forest Queen, on 4 August, was regarded as the "social event of the year". Among other duties, the Prince attended a reception and officially opened Wilmot Park.

While strolling the grounds of Government House, Albert Edward noted a canoeist on the Saint John River and called him over. The figure turned out to be Gabriel Acquin, who took Albert Edward on a jaunt across the river and a short way up the Nashwaak. This impressed the Prince so much he requested a canoe and paddles be obtained for him to take to the United Kingdom. Acquin became well known as a craftsman and was invited to several international exhibitions in Britain, where he shared his Wəlastəkwewiyik culture. Prince Albert Edward, with other members of the royal family, visited Acquin again when they were both at the International Fisheries Exhibition in 1883.

Prince Alfred, Albert Edward's younger brother, visited the Maritimes in 1861 and embarked on a steamboat excursion on the Saint John River, from Saint John to Fredericton, where the Prince also joined Gabriel Acquin on a canoe ride, as his brother had done the year before.

=== After the First World War ===
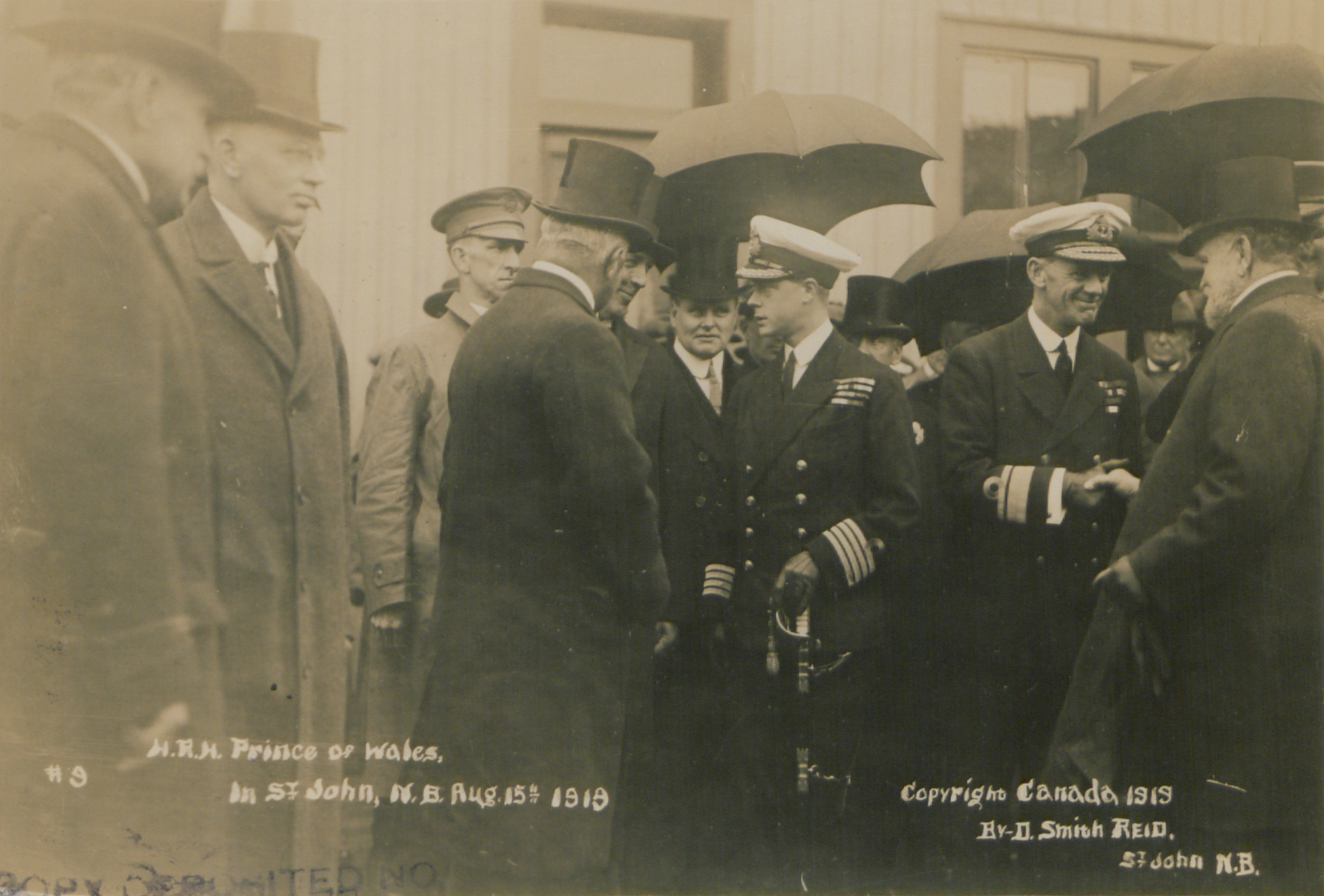
Prince Edward (later King Edward VIII) at Saint John, 15 August 1919

Edward VII's grandson, Prince Edward (later King Edward VIII), toured New Brunswick in 1919.

=== After the Second World War ===
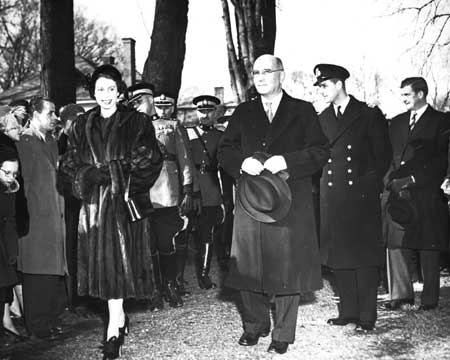
Princess Elizabeth, Duchess of Edinburgh, and Premier of New Brunswick John B. McNair, followed by the Duke of Edinburgh, walk from Christ Church Cathedral to the Legislative Building in Fredericton, 6 November 1951

King George VI's eldest daughter, Princess Elizabeth, Duchess of Edinburgh (later Queen Elizabeth II), arrived aboard the royal train in Fredericton with her husband, the Duke of Edinburgh, on 6 November 1951, being greeted officially by the King's representative, Lieutenant Governor David Laurence MacLaren, and, unofficially, by hundreds of spectators. In the capital, the couple visited Christ Church Cathedral and the Legislative Building before travelling on, via Moncton and Sackville, to Saint John, where they met First and Second World War veterans at the Lancaster Hospital and attended a civic dinner in the capital. At the University of New Brunswick, the arrangements were informal and the couple's Royal Canadian Mounted Police security detail overzealously confiscated the camera of a forestry student who happened to end up close to the Princess; the Duke eased the situation and suggested the officers return the camera to its owner.

Only a few months later, Princess Elizabeth acceded as Queen of Canada. Services of thanksgiving were held across the province for her coronation on 2 June 1953 and denizens rose early to catch radio broadcasts of the ceremony from London, marched in Co ronation Day parades, danced at coronation balls, and watched fireworks displays. New Brunswickers also formed part of the Canadian Coronation Contingent that travelled to the United Kingdom and took part in the coronation procession. Elizabeth made her first tour of New Brunswick as queen in 1959, arriving at Fredericton airport on 29 July; she and the Duke of Edinburgh (who, by then, also held the title of prince) were welcomed by Lieutenant Governor Joseph Leonard O'Brien and a 100-man guard of honour assembled by The Black Watch (Royal Highland Regiment) of Canada. In the capital, the couple took in harness racing and a Queen's Scout recognition ceremony and, in Moncton, visited Victoria Park. At Pointe-du-Chêne, the Queen and Duke met with the families of fishermenlost in the Escuminac hurricane. Fredericton artist Howard Berry painted a 2.44 by 1.22 metre (eight by four foot) portrait of the Queen that was hung on the porch of the Legislative Building; it contained three significant allegories: a granite boulder, symbolizing New Brunswickers' loyalty; a body of water, indicating the St. Lawrence Seaway (which Elizabeth opened that year); and a glimpse of New Brunswick scenery, which was meant as an invitation.

=== The 1970s ===
Fredericton was again the starting point of a provincial tour by the Queen and Prince Philip, on 15 July 1976. Lieutenant Governor Hédard Robichaud (the first Acadian to act as the Queen's representative in New Brunswick) was there for the royal couple's arrival, after which they visited the Legislative Building and City Hall. At the parliament, Chief Anthony Francis, President of the Union of New Brunswick Indians, presented a petition to the Queen, demonstrating the connection between the Canadian Crown and the Indigenous peoples of Canada.

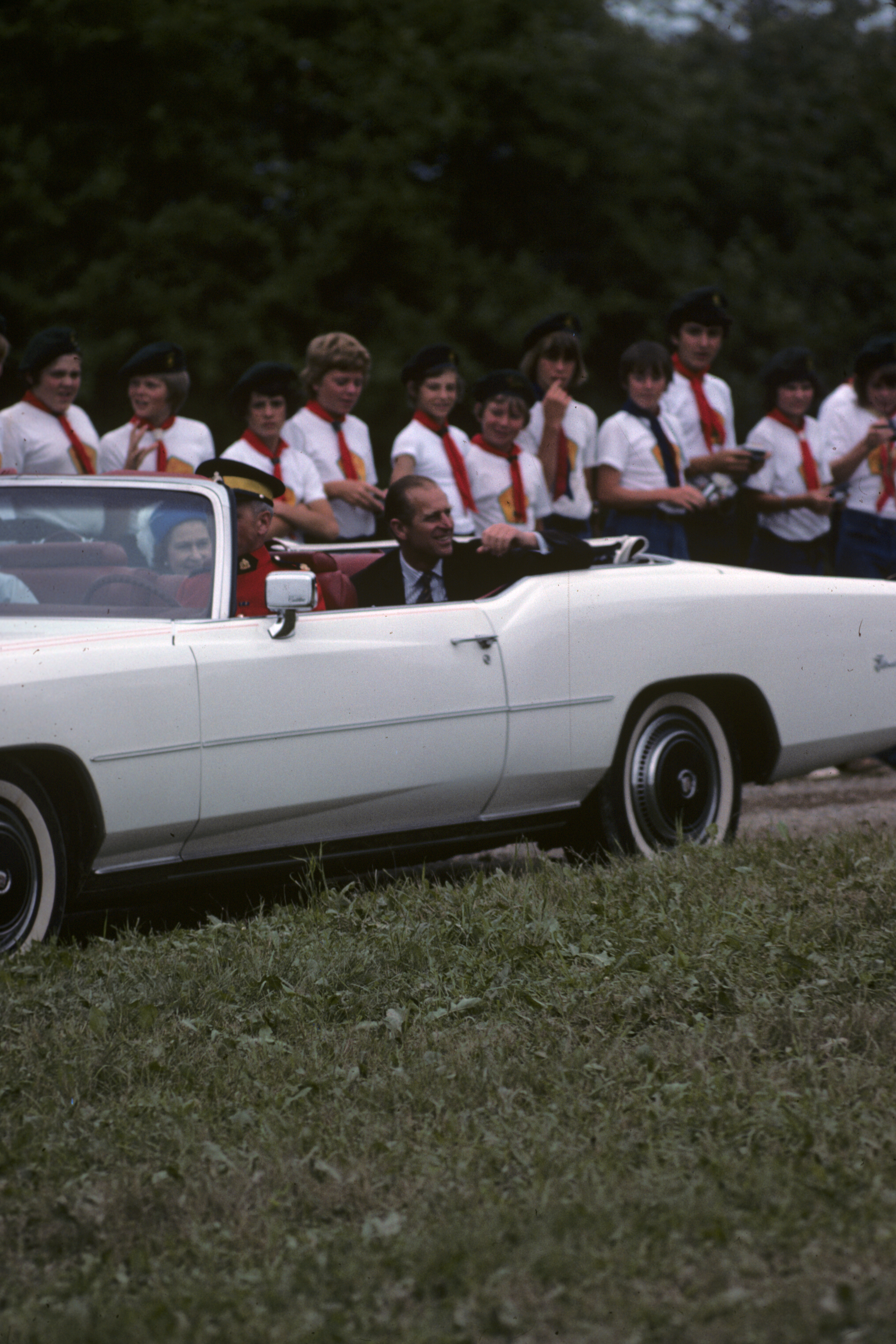
Queen Elizabeth II and Prince Philip, Duke of Edinburgh, at the Boy Scout and Girl Guide jamboree at Woolastook Provincial Park, near Fredericton, 15 July 1976

Elizabeth and Philip stopped at the Boy Scout and Girl Guide jamboree at Woolastook Provincial Park, where they had a picnic with the approximately 3,500 scouts and guides in attendance and watched performances by the Madawaska Dancers, Les jeunes chanteurs d’Acadie, the Kiwanis Steel Band, and the St. Andrew's Pipe Band, before moving on to Kings Landing Historical Settlement, there opening Morehouse House and launching the reproduction of the historical sailing ship, Brunswick Lion, which greatly interested Prince Philip, given his naval background. In the evening, the Queen hosted a dinner at McConnell Hall, at the University of New Brunswick, followed by a fireworks show.

In Miramichi, the following day, the Queen and Duke watched an armed forces program at CFB Chatham and attended a lunch put on by the provincial Crown-in-Council. There, Premier Richard B. Hatfield presented Elizabeth with a gift from New Brunswickers: a quilt hand-sewn by the Havelock United Baptist Church Ladies’ Auxiliary. The royal party moved on to Newcastle, where the Queen, as Sovereign of the Order of Saint John, met members of the Saint John Ambulance Brigade, and visited with employees and their families at the Burchill Laminating Plant.

=== The 1980s ===
The Queen and Prince Philip journeyed to New Brunswick to celebrate the province's bicentennial in 1984, arriving at Moncton on 24 September. The royal couple visited St. Joseph's Parish Church in Shediac to unveil a plaque marking the parish's 100th anniversary, The next day, Elizabeth and Philip attended service at Christ Church Cathedral in Fredericton and were at the Legislative Building, where the Queen issued a royal warrant augmenting the province's coat of arms with its present crest, supporters, compartment, and motto. The couple visited the University of New Brunswick for a lunch hosted by the provincial Crown, as well as Wilmot Park, where the Queen unveiled the plaque honouring Edward Wilmot for gifting the park to the city and recounting the park's official opening by Prince Albert Edward in 1860, and the Beaverbrook Art Gallery.

=== The 2000s ===
For the Golden Jubilee celebrating Queen Elizabeth II's 50 years as Queen of Canada, she and her husband toured New Brunswick as part of their coast-to-coast-to-coast journey around the country, arriving in the province on 11 October 2002. At Government House, the Queen received the royal salute from, and inspected the guard of honour mounted by, the Royal New Brunswick Regiment; heard a Maliseet aboriginal song of welcome; and met with veterans, members of the Saint John branch of the United Empire Loyalists Association, and other members of the public. The Queen also attended an investiture ceremony for inductees into the Order of New Brunswick.

The Queen and Duke of Edinburgh the following day, 12 October 2002, visited Sussex Elementary School for Elizabeth to open the school's new wing. The royal couple then moved on to watch an equestrian demonstration and meet with 4-H members and the public, including war brides, at Princess Louise Park. In Moncton, the Queen and Duke performed a walkabout at Assumption Plaza on their way to the Delta Beauséjour Hotel. Finally, at Moncton airport, the Queen officially opened the new terminal and unveiled a plaque marking both that event and the designation of the aerodrome as an international airport.

In 2022, New Brunswick instituted a provincial Platinum Jubilee medal to mark the Queen's seventy years on the Canadian throne; the first time in Canada's history that a royal occasion was commemorated on provincial medals.

== See also ==
- Symbols of New Brunswick
- Monarchy

== Further information ==
- Remembering Elizabeth in New Brunswick: See treasures from the archives, CBC News, 18 September 2022
