= Brenda Murphy =

32nd lieutenant governor of New Brunswick

The Honourable Brenda Murphy ONB
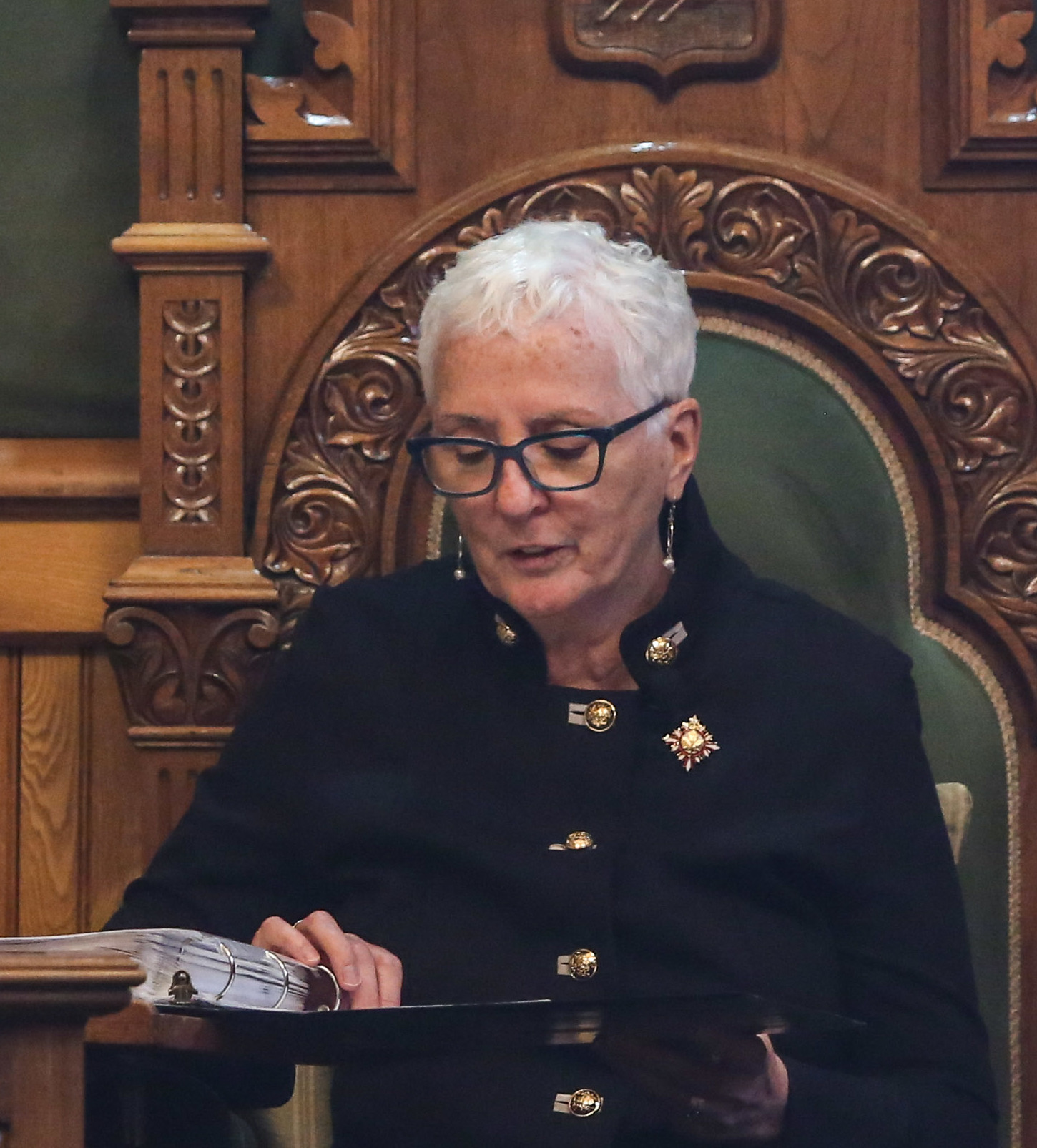
- Murphy in 2020

32nd Lieutenant Governor of New Brunswick
- In office September 8, 2019 – January 22, 2025
- Monarchs: Elizabeth II; Charles III
- Governors General: Julie Payette; Mary Simon
- Premier: Blaine Higgs; Susan Holt
- Preceded by: Jocelyne Roy-Vienneau
- Succeeded by: Louise Imbeault

Personal details
- Born: 1958 or 1959 (age 67–68)
- Domestic partner: Linda Boyle

Brenda L. Murphy (born 1959) is a Canadian activist and politician who served as the 32nd lieutenant governor of New Brunswick, from 2019 to 2025.

== Career ==
She served as a municipal councillor in Grand Bay–Westfield and as the executive director of the Saint John Women's Empowerment Network in Saint John, best known for her advocacy on poverty and domestic violence issues. She also served on a federal advisory council on poverty, and on New Brunswick's advisory council on the status of women.

=== Lieutenant-governor ===
On September 8, 2019, she began serving as lieutenant governor of New Brunswick. She was both the province's first openly LGBT lieutenant governor and the first openly LGBT person to hold any viceregal office in Canada. She stepped down at the end of her term in 2025.

In April 2022, the Court of Queen's Bench of New Brunswick ruled that her appointment as lieutenant governor violated the bilingual status of the province under the Charter of Rights and Freedoms, since Murphy is unilingual English-speaking. In May 2024, the Court of Appeal of New Brunswick overturned this judgment. However, in June 2026 the Supreme Court of Canada ruled that the lieutenant-governor of New Brunswick must be able to perform their functions in both English and French.

Ms Murphy learned to speak French while in office. On November 15, 2024, Louise Imbeault was named as Murphy's successor.

== Honours and awards ==
Ribbon Bar of Brenda Murphy

Ribbon	Description	Post-nominal letters	Date	Notes
	Dame of Justice of the Order of St. John	D.St.J	2020	
	Member of the Order of New Brunswick	O.N.B	2019	Member ex officio, by virtue as Chancellor of the Order during her lieutenant governorship
	Queen Elizabeth II Platinum Jubilee Medal		2022	New-Brunswick version
	King Charles III Coronation Medal		2024	Canadian version

== Personal life ==
Murphy lives in Grand Bay–Westfield. Her partner Linda Boyle accompanied her on official engagements, including a visit to King Charles III at Buckingham Palace in November 2022.

== Arms ==
Coat of arms of Brenda Murphy
Crest A butternut tree Or leaved Purpure fructed Argent issuant from a circlet Or the upper rim set with purple violets Proper. Escutcheon Per bend wavy Or and Purpure a bend wavy counterchanged between in chief an orca enarched Purpure embellished Argent and in base semé of mayflowers Argent seeded Or. Supporters Two snow geese Argent beaked and legged Or their exterior wings elevated and embellished standing on a cable ferry Purpure its railing Argent issuant from a bar wavy Argent charged with a barrulet wavy Purpure. Motto Every Voice Matters
