= Order of precedence in New Brunswick =

Relative preeminence of officials for ceremonial purposes

The New Brunswick order of precedence is a nominal and symbolic hierarchy of important positions within the province of New Brunswick. It has no legal standing but is used to dictate ceremonial protocol at events of a provincial nature.

1. The King in Right of New Brunswick (His Majesty Charles III)
2. The Lieutenant Governor (Louise Imbeault)
3. The Premier (Susan Holt)
4. The Chief Justice of New Brunswick
5. The Speaker of the Legislative Assembly (Francine Landry)
6. Former Lieutenant Governors
7. Former Premiers
8. Former Chief Justices of New Brunswick
9. Ambassadors, High Commissioners, Ministers Plenipotentiary, and Chargé d'Affaires with precedence to their date of appointment
10. Members of the Executive Council of New Brunswick with precedence in accordance with the Executive Council Act
11. Leader of the Opposition
12. Chief Justice of the Court of King's Bench
13. Members of the Senate
14. Members of the House of Commons
15. Judges of the Court of Appeal with precedence according to their date of appointment
16. Judges of the Court of King's Bench with precedence according to their date of appointment
17. Members of the Legislative Assembly in the following order: Deputy Speaker, Government House Leader, Opposition House Leader, Leaders of Unofficial Opposition Parties, other members with precedence according to their date and order of their swearing in as Members of the Legislature
18. Elders and Chiefs of New Brunswick Indian Bands
19. Leaders of religious denominations with precedence according to their date of appointment or election to the present office
20. Chief Judge of the Provincial Court
21. Judges of the Provincial Court with precedence according to their date of appointment
22. Members of the Consular Corps in the following order: Consuls General, Consuls, Vice- Consuls, Honorary Consuls and Consular Agents with precedence among themselves according to their date of appointment
23. Mayors of the Cities of New Brunswick (with precedence given to the Mayor of the host municipality where appropriate) in the following order: Fredericton, Saint John, Moncton, Edmundston, Campbellton, Bathurst, Miramichi and Dieppe
24. Mayors of the Towns of New Brunswick with precedence among themselves according to the alphabetical order of the place-names
25. Mayors of the Villages of New Brunswick with precedence according to the alphabetical order of the place-names
26. Councillors of the Cities, Towns, and Villages of New Brunswick in the same order of precedence among themselves according to the alphabetical order of their surnames
27. Clerk of the Legislative Assembly
28. Ombudsman
29. Auditor General
30. Commissioner of Official Languages for New Brunswick
31. Clerk of the Executive Council
32. Deputy Heads of the Civil Service, with precedence according to their date of appointment
33. Heads of Crown Corporations and Agencies, with precedence according to their date of appointment
34. Assistant Commissioner of "J" Division, Royal Canadian Mounted Police
35. Commander of Canadian Forces Base Gagetown
36. Chancellors of New Brunswick universities in the following order: University of New Brunswick, Mount Allison University, St. Thomas University and Université de Moncton
37. Presidents of the universities in New Brunswick in the same order of precedence as the Chancellors
