= Wilmot Park =

Urban park in Fredericton

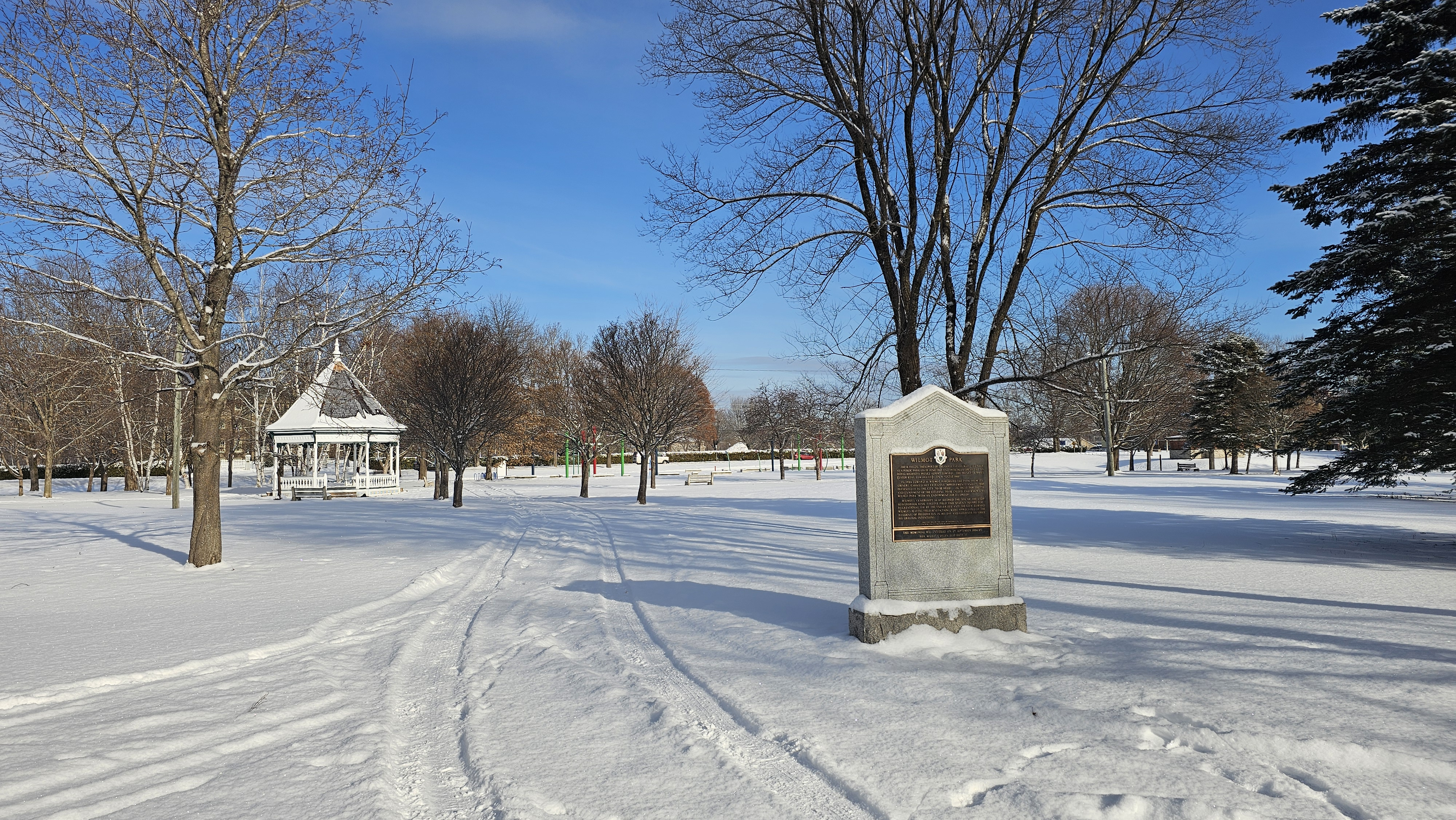
- The park in 2025
- Interactive map of Wilmot Park
- Location: Fredericton, New Brunswick, Canada
- Coordinates: 45°57′50″N 66°39′25″W
- Area: 4.9 hectares (12 acres)
- Established: 1895
- Operated by: The City of Fredericton

Wilmot Park is an urban park in Fredericton, New Brunswick, Canada, located across Woodstock Road from Government House.

The area was originally proposed for use as either a public park or pleasure ground by its owner, William Hunter Odell, who, in 1860, offered to donate the land to the city. The city declined his proposal, which had included a provision that would have spared his remaining property from taxation. However, a committee of citizens accepted the land from Odell and, on August 6, 1860, the Prince of Wales (later King Edward VII) declared it open. However, the area remained largely undeveloped for the next several years, with the city describing it during this time as a pleasure ground. In 1894, Edward H. Wilmot bought the land. Wilmot began work on developing the property into a park and, the following year, he donated it to the city, with the provision that it bear his surname. In 1984, Queen Elizabeth II visited the park.

== Description ==
The park covers an area of 4.9 hectares (12 acres). It is bounded by Rookwood Avenue, Woodstock Road, Odell Avenue, and Saunders Street. As of 2025, the park features a gravel trail system and is landscaped with elm trees, flowers, and various fruit trees. Facilities include a bandstand and splash pad, in addition to courts for basketball, lawn bowling, and tennis. A senior centre, the Stepping Stone Seniors Centre, is also located within the park, adjacent to Saunders Street. Government House overlooks the park, across Woodstock Road.

== History ==
=== Establishment ===
In 1860, William Hunter Odell, a large landowner who operated the Rookwood estate in Fredericton, offered the land now occupied by Wilmot Park to the city for use as either a pleasure ground or public park. As part of the offer, Odell stipulated that the city would have to immediately commence on the fencing and development of the land and hire a groundskeeper. Additionally, the city would not levy taxes against Odell's remaining property, which constituted over 400 acres (160 hectares). However, the city declined the offer. In response, several Fredericton citizens organized a committee to accept the property on behalf of the citizenry. A ceremony for this was held on June 18, 1860, and on August 6 of that year, the Prince of Wales (later King Edward VII) declared it officially open. According to the city of Fredericton, the land at this time was a "pleasure ground".

Over the next several years, the property remained relatively undeveloped as a pasture. However, in 1894, Edward H. Wilmot (the younger half-brother of local politician Lemuel Allan Wilmot) purchased the property from Odell's widow. Following this, Wilmot spent nearly $10,000 (equivalent to $423,000 in 2025) developing the area into a park. In 1895, Wilmot donated the park to the city, along with an endowment of $10,000 ($428,000 in 2025) for its upkeep and further development, with the stipulation that it be called Wilmot Park in his honor. The city accepted and created a committee to oversee the park's further development, which included the planting of 500 elm trees, the installation of a bandstand and water fountain, and the creation of a trail system.

=== Later history ===
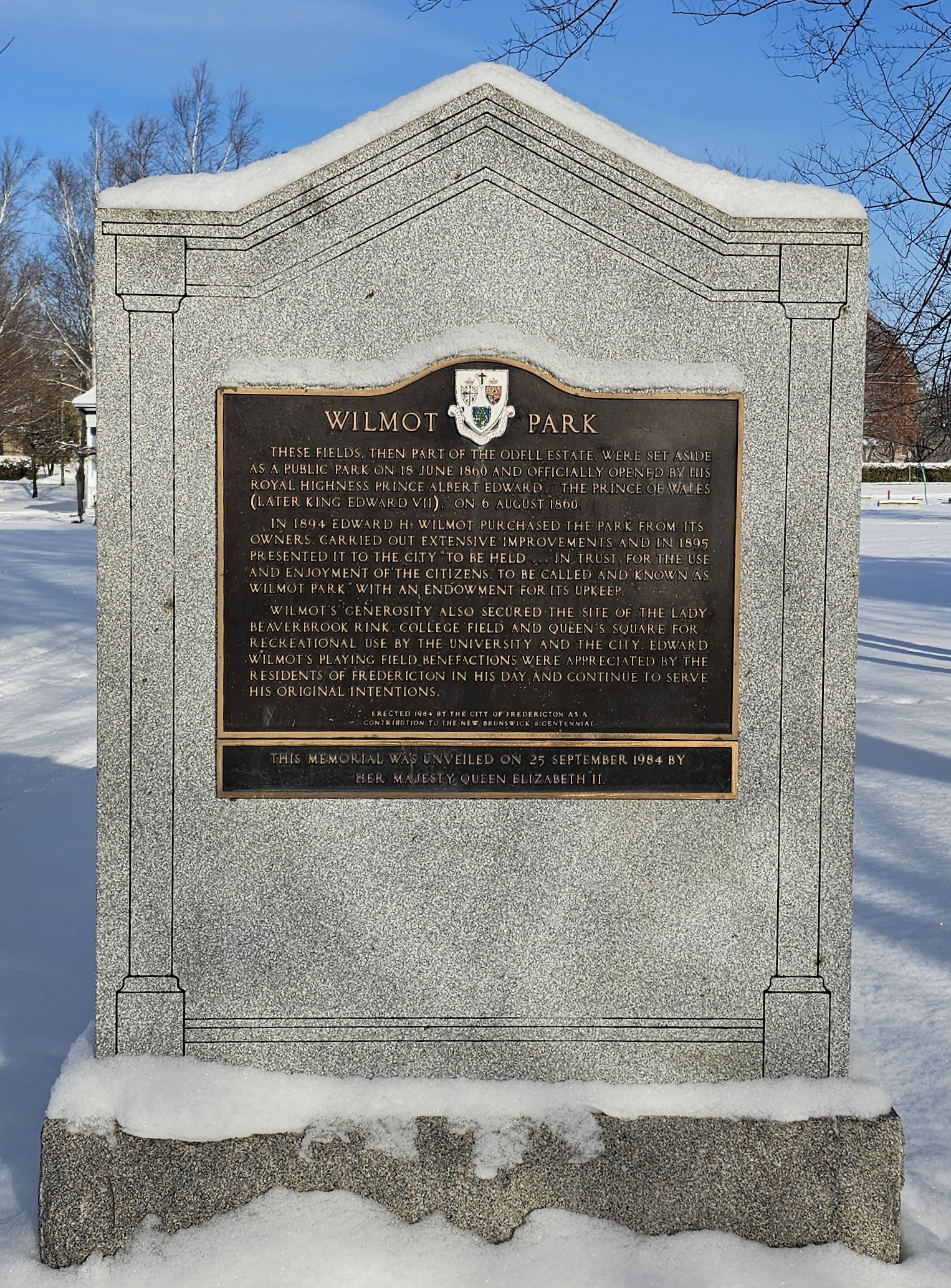
Historical marker erected in 1984

In 1940, Odell's remaining property, constituting about 370 acres (150 ha), was purchased by the city and developed into another park: Odell Park. By this time, in addition to Wilmot Park, parts of Odell's property had been sold and developed into the Fredericton Exhibition and Fredericton Raceway. In 1984, the park hosted a picnic attended by Queen Elizabeth II during a royal tour of Canada. In August 2016, the city opened a splash pad in the park, replacing a wading pool that had been built in 1967. Funding for the project was split by the city, province of New Brunswick, and the Atlantic Canada Opportunities Agency, who paid $825,000 ($1,055,000 in 2025), $350,000 ($448,000 in 2025), and $131,733 ($168,462 in 2025), respectively. In July 2024, the bandstand was damaged in an act of arson. Restoration work on the partially destroyed structure began the following month. In July 2025, 30 fruit trees—consisting of apples, cherries, mulberries, pears, and plums—were planted in the park as part of a project to increase community access to fresh fruit.

==== 2020 murder ====
On the morning of April 15, 2020, the body of Clark Ernest Greene was discovered in the park. He had suffered severe injuries and was declared dead that day, with his death being considered a homicide. On May 25, Angela April Walsh and Zachery David Murphy were arrested on charges of first-degree murder regarding Greene's death. In November 2021, Murphy pleaded guilty to the lesser charge of second-degree murder and elected for a trial by judge, Walsh also pleaded guilty to second-degree murder after Murphy stated that he had been fully responsible for Greene's killing. Both were sentenced to life imprisonment, with the possibility of parole beginning after 11 years and 13 years for Murphy and Walsh, respectively.

== See also ==
- List of historic places in York County, New Brunswick
