= William Bennett (clergyman) =

- Born: c. 1770
- Died: 7 November 1857; Halifax
- Occupation: Minister

William Bennett (c. 1770 – 7 November 1857) was a British born Methodist minister of whom little is known before 1800.

Bennett became known to history when the British Wesleyan Conference sent him as a missionary to Nova Scotia. His work as a missionary in Nova Scotia and New Brunswick was important to the development of the Methodist Church in the Maritimes.
