= Government House (New Brunswick) =

Vice-regal residence in Fredricton, New Brunswick

Government House Résidence du governeur (French)
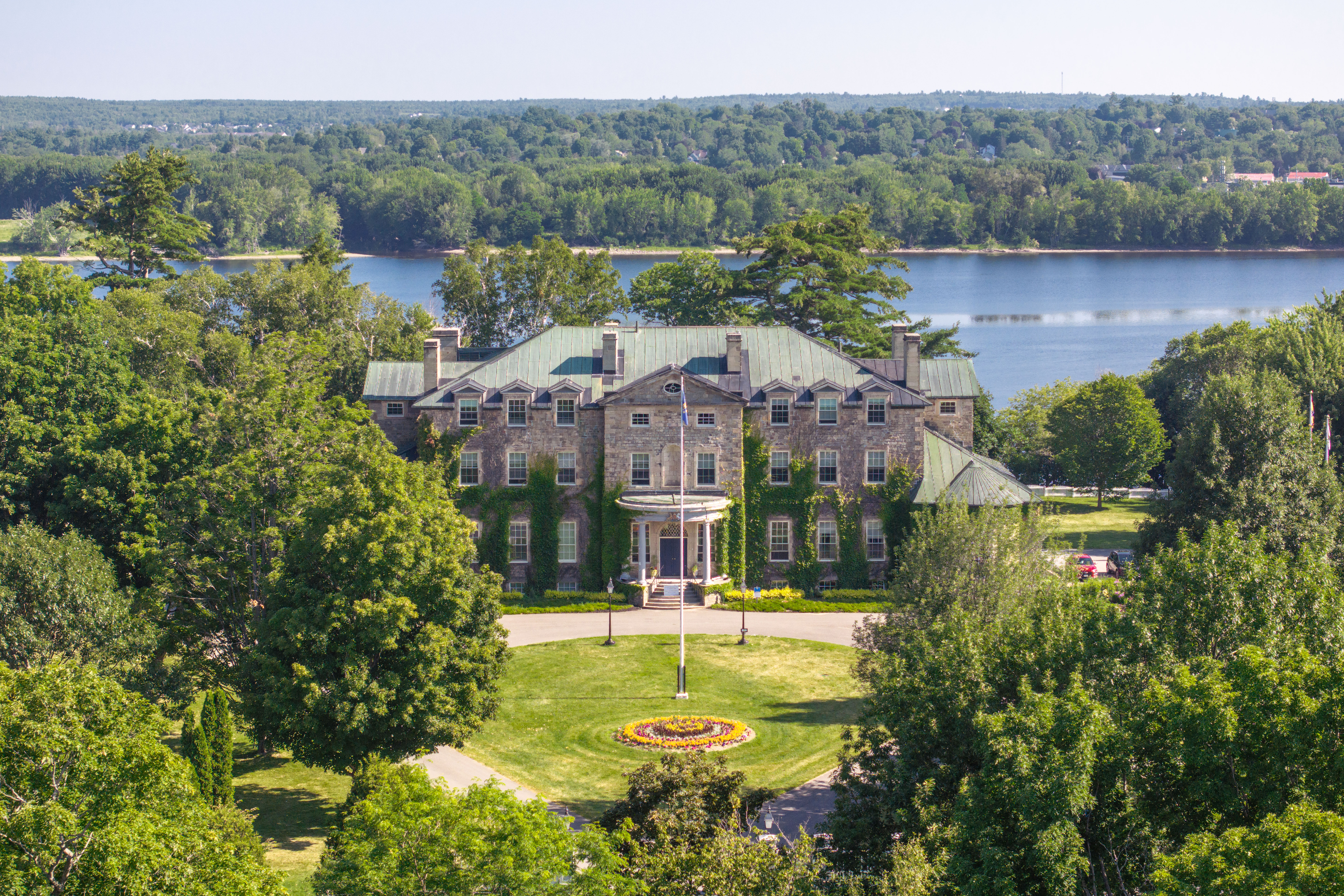
- The building in 2026

General information
- Architectural style: Adamesque Georgian
- Location: 51 Woodstock Road; Fredericton, New Brunswick, Canada
- Coordinates: 45.965589°N 66.655834°W
- Construction started: 1826
- Client: Lieutenant Governor of New Brunswick
- Owner: The King in Right of New Brunswick (Charles III)

Technical details
- Structural system: Timber framing and load-bearing masonry

National Historic Site of Canada
- Official name: Old Government House National Historic Site of Canada
- Designated: 1958

New Brunswick Heritage Conservation Act
- Type: Provincial Heritage Place
- Designated: 1996

Government House is the official residence of the Lieutenant Governor of New Brunswick in Canada. Located in Fredericton, it stands on a 4.5 ha (11 acre) estate along the Saint John River in the provincial capital at 51 Woodstock Road; while the equivalent building in many countries has a prominent, central place in the territorial capital, the site of New Brunswick's Government House is relatively unobtrusive within Fredericton, giving it more the character of a private home.

== History ==
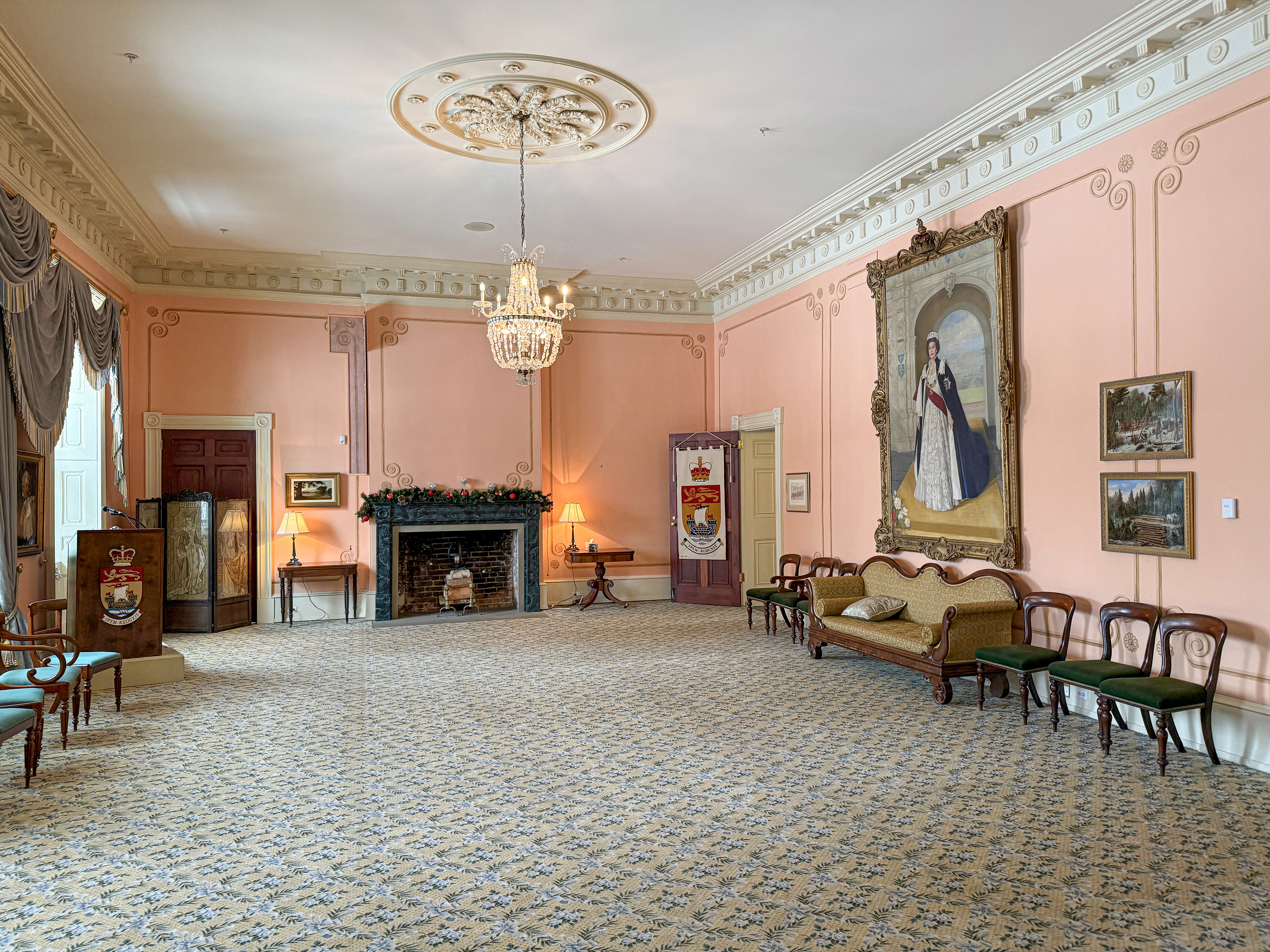
Ballroom at Government House in 2026

Intended to replace the residence of the colonial Lieutenant Governors of New Brunswick that burned down in 1825, Government House was erected between 1826 and 1828 on the site of the former Acadian settlement of Sainte-Anne, and served as meeting place for the viceroy and his Executive Council, balls, and state dinners.

In 1890, however, Lieutenant Governor Samuel Leonard Tilley felt the maintenance budget for the house was insufficient and consequently relocated, after which the former viceregal residence took on other roles. From 1896 to 1900, it served as New Brunswick's Institute for the Deaf and Dumb, was a military barracks through World War I, a soldiers' hospital following the war, and, from 1934 to 1988, was the J Division regional headquarters of the Royal Canadian Mounted Police.

In 1958, it was designated as a National Historic Site of Canada, and in 1996 it was designated provincially under the Historic Sites Protection Act.

Only on 1 July 1999, after two years of extensive renovation and restoration of the structure and its interiors, was the mansion returned to viceregal service in a ceremony including representatives of the Maliseet First Nation, the ancestors of which performed dances on New Year's Day 164 years earlier, both times to demonstrate the importance of the relationship between them and the Crown.

== Use ==
Government House is where visiting dignitaries are greeted and often stay while in Fredericton. It is also where numerous vice-regal events take place, such as the bestowing of provincial awards or inductions into the Order of New Brunswick, as well as luncheons, dinners, receptions, and speaking engagements. It is also at the vice-regal residence that the lieutenant governor drops the writs of election, swears-in new members of the Executive Council, and holds audiences with the premier.

The property is owned by the King in Right of New Brunswick and, as mandated before its renovation in 1996, is open to the public. In that vein, the grounds of the vice-regal estate are frequently the site of public celebrations, such as those for Canada Day and New Brunswick Day.

== Architecture ==
The vice-regal residence of New Brunswick was built of load-bearing masonry walls and timber floor and roof framing, all clad in a sandstone exterior. The building, designed by architect James Woolford, is in the Georgian style with touches of Adam, being a hip roofed, rectangular, two storey block divided by two perpendicular axes. The main facade is aligned on the entrance and its curved portico, above which is an arched niche and, at the roof, a shallow gable pierced by a rose window; to either side of this are rows of multi-paned, sash windows, the attic having wall dormers, and one storey wings, each with a curved bay window. On the main floor is found the drawing room, dining room, music room, library, two conservatories, and the historical lieutenant governor's office; the second floor contains exhibit rooms and the lieutenant governor's present office; and the third floor holds the viceroy's private apartments.

== See also ==
- Government Houses in Canada
- Government Houses of the British Empire
