= William Hunter Odell =

Canadian lawyer, judge, and politician (1811–1891)

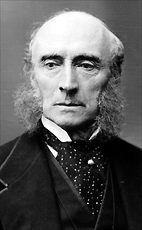
William Hunter Odell

William Hunter Odell (26 November 1811 – 25 or 26 July 1891) was a Canadian lawyer, judge, and politician.

Born in Fredericton, New Brunswick, the son of William Franklin Odell and Elizabeth Newell, Odell studied law at what was then King's College (a predecessor institution to the modern University of New Brunswick) and was admitted as an attorney in 1835 and a barrister in 1838.

He was appointed to the Legislative Council of New Brunswick in 1850 and following Canadian Confederation in 1867, Odell was appointed to the Senate of Canada by royal proclamation on 23 October 1867. A Conservative, Odell represented the senatorial division of Rockwood, New Brunswick until his death.

He was married to Elizabeth Ann Bliss (1824–1901), daughter of William Blowers Bliss and Sarah Ann Anderson. They had one son, Maj. William Henry Odell (1852–1894), and four daughters.
