= Louise Imbeault =

Lieutenant governor of New Brunswick since 2025

Her Honour the Honourable Louise Imbeault OC ONB
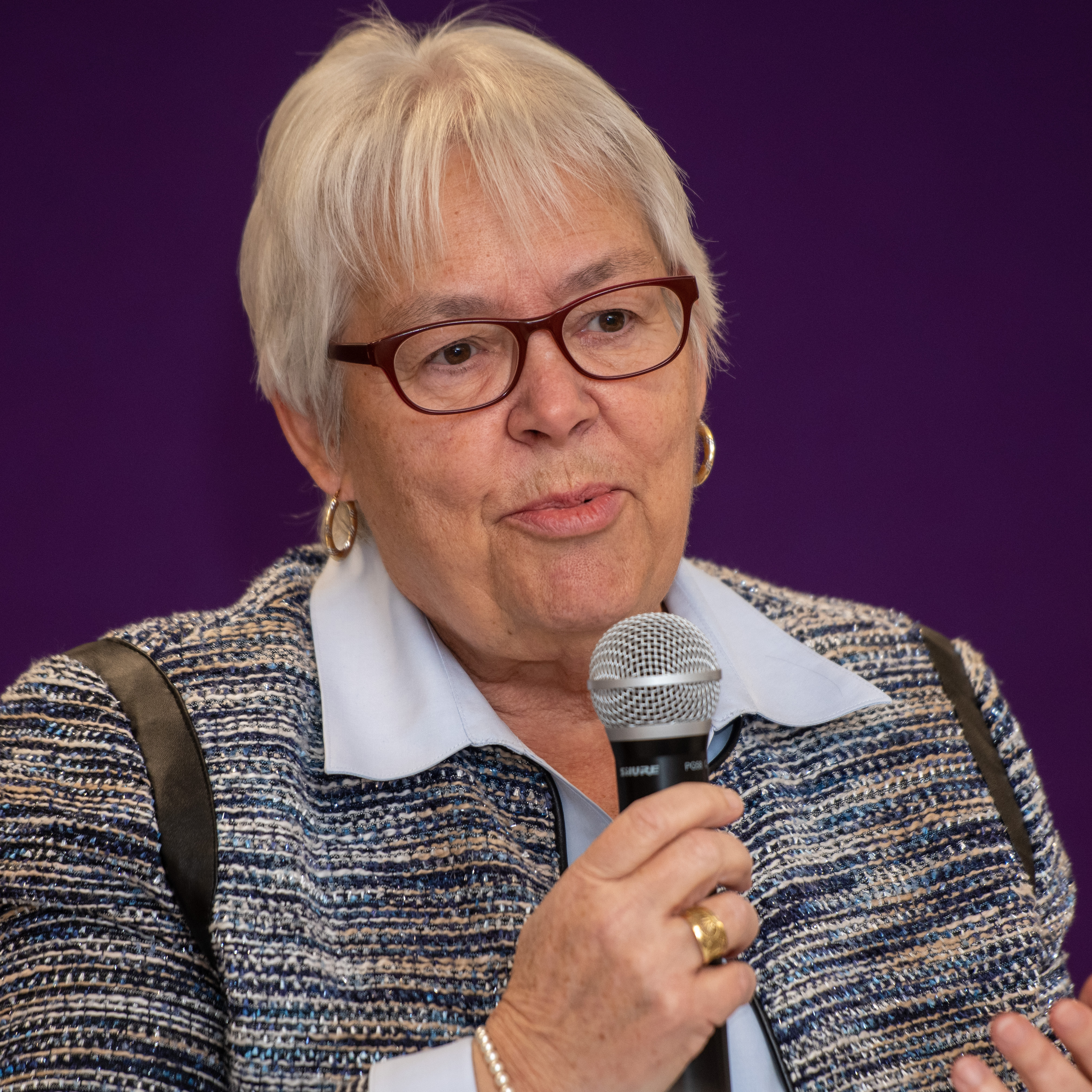
- Imbeault in 2019

33rd Lieutenant Governor of New Brunswick
- Incumbent
- Assumed office January 22, 2025
- Monarch: Charles III
- Governors General: Mary Simon; Louise Arbour
- Premier: Susan Holt
- Preceded by: Brenda Murphy

Chancellor of the Université de Moncton
- In office June 2018 – June 2023

Canadian Representative to the UNESCO Women's Rights Commission
- In office 1984–1986

Louise Imbeault OC ONB (French pronunciation: [ɛ̃bo]) is a Canadian journalist, women's rights advocate, and the 33rd lieutenant governor of New Brunswick, since January 22, 2025.

On November 15, 2024, Imbeault's appointment by Mary Simon, Governor General of Canada (representing Charles III, King of Canada), on the advice of Justin Trudeau, Prime Minister of Canada, as the lieutenant governor was announced.

Prior to her appointment as lieutenant governor, she worked for Radio-Canada for over 30 years, and since 1996 was director of Radio-Canada Atlantique, later renamed Radio-Canada Acadie. At the 1984 and 1986 UNESCO general conferences, she served as the Canadian representative on the Women's Rights Commission.

In June 2018, she became the chancellor of the Université de Moncton. She received the Order of New Brunswick in 2018, and the Order of Canada in 2023.

Order of precedence
Preceded by Mike Savage as Lieutenant Governor of Nova Scotia	Order of Precedence of Canada as Lieutenant Governor of New Brunswick	Succeeded by Anita Neville as Lieutenant Governor of Manitoba
