= Lieutenant Governor of New Brunswick =

Representative in New Brunswick of the Canadian monarch

- Emblem of the lieutenant governor

- Flag of the lieutenant governor of New Brunswick

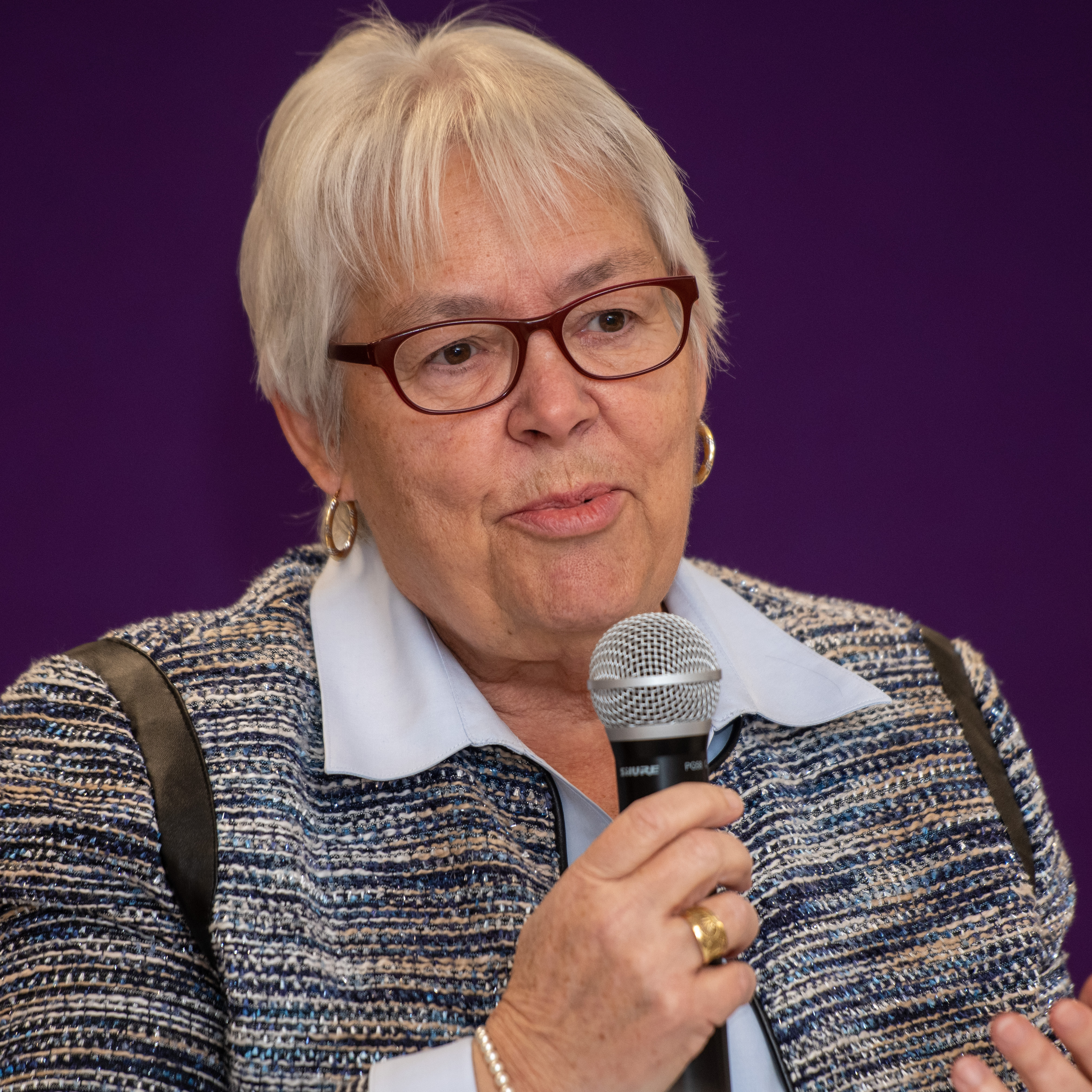
- Incumbent; Louise Imbeault since January 22, 2025
- Viceroy
- Style: His / Her Honour the Honourable
- Residence: Government House, Fredericton
- Appointer: The governor general on the advice of the prime minister
- Term length: Five year term, removable for cause by the governor general; after five years, at the governor general's pleasure
- Constituting instrument: Constitution Act, 1867
- Formation: 1 July 1867
- First holder: Sir Charles Hastings Doyle
- Website: www2.gnb.ca/content/gnb/en/lgnb.html

The lieutenant governor of New Brunswick (/lɛfˈtɛnənt/, in French: Lieutenant-gouverneur (if male) or Lieutenante-gouverneure (if female) du Nouveau-Brunswick) is the representative in New Brunswick of the monarch, who operates distinctly within the province but is also shared equally with the ten other jurisdictions of Canada. The lieutenant governor of New Brunswick is appointed in the same manner as the other provincial viceroys in Canada and is similarly tasked with carrying out most of the monarch's constitutional and ceremonial duties. The current Lieutenant Governor is Louise Imbeault, since 22 January 2025.

== Role and presence ==
The lieutenant governor of New Brunswick is vested with a number of governmental duties and is also expected to undertake various ceremonial roles. For instance, the lieutenant governor acts as patron, honorary president, or an honorary member of certain New Brunswick institutions, such as the Canadian Red Cross (New Brunswick Region), the New Brunswick Lung Association, and the Royal Canadian Legion (New Brunswick Command). Also, The viceroy, him or herself a member and Chancellor of the order, will induct deserving individuals into the Order of New Brunswick and, upon installation, automatically becomes a Knight or Dame of Justice and the Vice-Prior in New Brunswick of the Most Venerable Order of the Hospital of Saint John of Jerusalem. The viceroy further presents the lieutenant governor's Prize for the Conservation of Wild Atlantic Salmon, and numerous other provincial honours and decorations, as well as various awards that are named for and presented by the lieutenant governor; these are generally created in partnership with another government or charitable organization and linked specifically to their cause. These honours are presented at official ceremonies, which count amongst hundreds of other engagements the lieutenant governor partakes in each year, either as host or guest of honour; the lieutenant governor of New Brunswick undertook an average of 500 engagements in both 2006 and 2007.

At these events, the lieutenant governor's presence is marked by the lieutenant governor's standard, consisting of a blue field bearing the escutcheon of the Arms of His Majesty in Right of New Brunswick surmounted by a crown and surrounded by ten gold maple leaves, symbolizing the ten provinces of Canada. Within New Brunswick, the lieutenant governor also follows only the sovereign in the province's order of precedence, preceding even other members of the Canadian Royal Family and the King's federal representative.

== History ==
Standard of the lieutenant governor of New Brunswick from 1870 to 1982

The office of lieutenant governor of New Brunswick came into being in 1786, when the colony of New Brunswick was split out of Nova Scotia and, at the same time, the government of William Pitt adopted the idea that the new jurisdiction, along with Prince Edward Island, Nova Scotia, and Quebec, should have as their respective governors a single individual. The post Governor of New Brunswick thus came to be occupied by the overreaching authority of the governor-in-chief, who was represented in the colony by a lieutenant. The modern incarnation of the office, however, was established in 1867, upon New Brunswick's entry into Confederation. Since that date, thirty lieutenant governors have served the province, amongst whom were notable firsts, such as:

Hédard Robichaud, first lieutenant governor of New Brunswick of Acadian ancestry. (1971-81)

Margaret McCain, first female lieutenant governor of New Brunswick. (1994-97)

Graydon Nicholas, first First Nations lieutenant governor of New Brunswick. (2009-14)

The shortest mandate by a lieutenant governor of New Brunswick was John Boyd, from 21 September 1893 to 4 December 1893, while the longest was David Laurence MacLaren, from 1 November 1945 to 5 June 1958.

== See also ==
- Monarchy in the Canadian provinces
- Government of New Brunswick
- Lieutenant Governors of Canada
- List of lieutenant governors of New Brunswick (1786-present)
