= New Brunswick Legislative Building =

Building in Fredericton, Canada

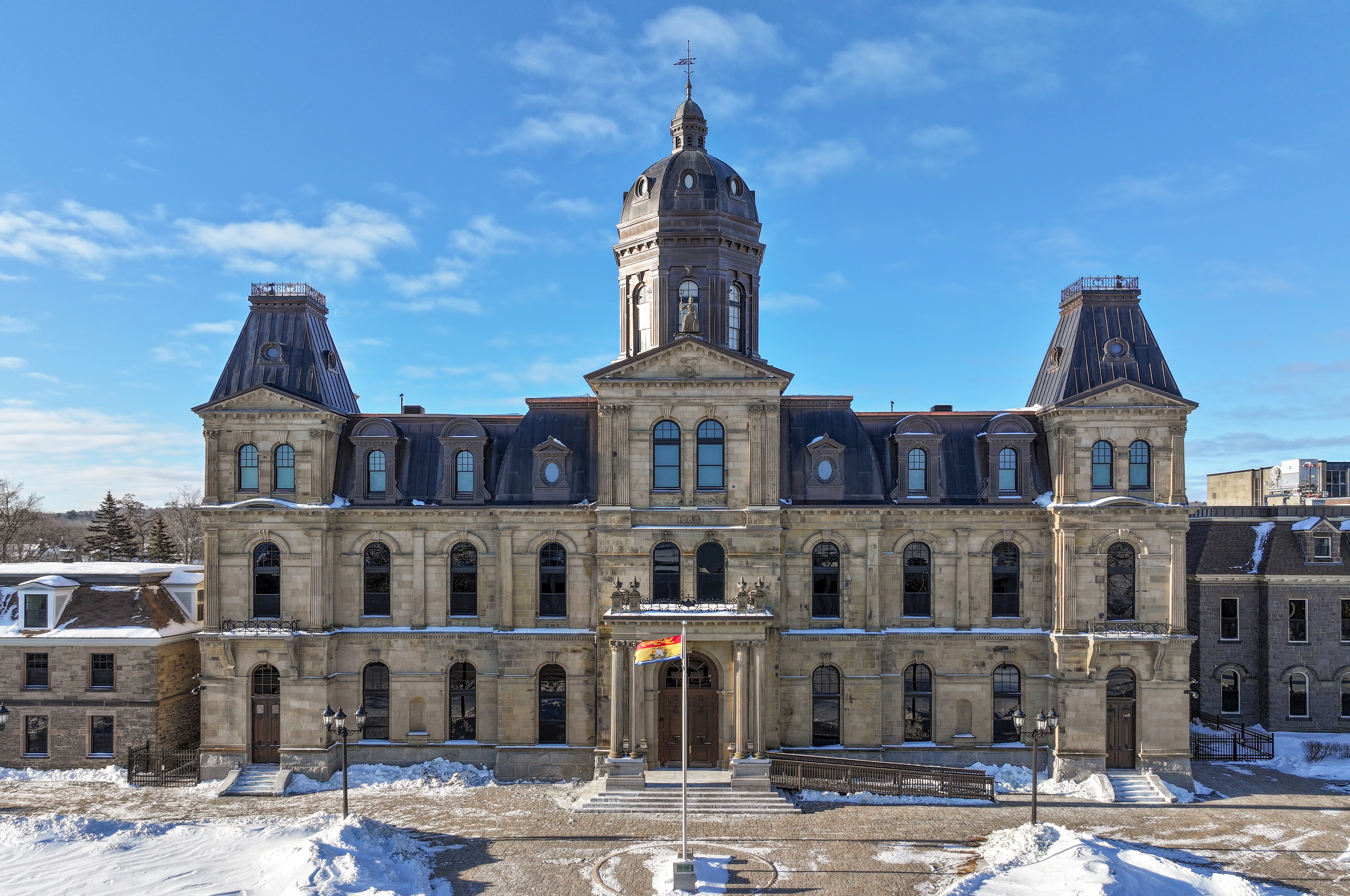
- Legislative Building in 2025

- Location within New Brunswick

General information
- Architectural style: Second Empire
- Location: 706 Queen Street; Fredericton, New Brunswick; E3B 1C5
- Coordinates: 45.959325°N 66.636103°W
- Client: Government of New Brunswick

Height
- Height: 41 metres (135 ft)

Design and construction
- Architect: J.C. Dumaresq

The New Brunswick Legislative Building (French: Édifice de l'Assemblée législative du Nouveau-Brunswick) is the seat of the Legislative Assembly of New Brunswick and is located in Fredericton, New Brunswick, Canada. Opened in 1882, the Second Empire–style structure was designed by Saint John architect J.C. Dumaresq and replaced the previous legislature, which was destroyed by fire in 1877. The building rises to approximately 41 metres (135 ft) at the top of its central rotunda.

== History ==
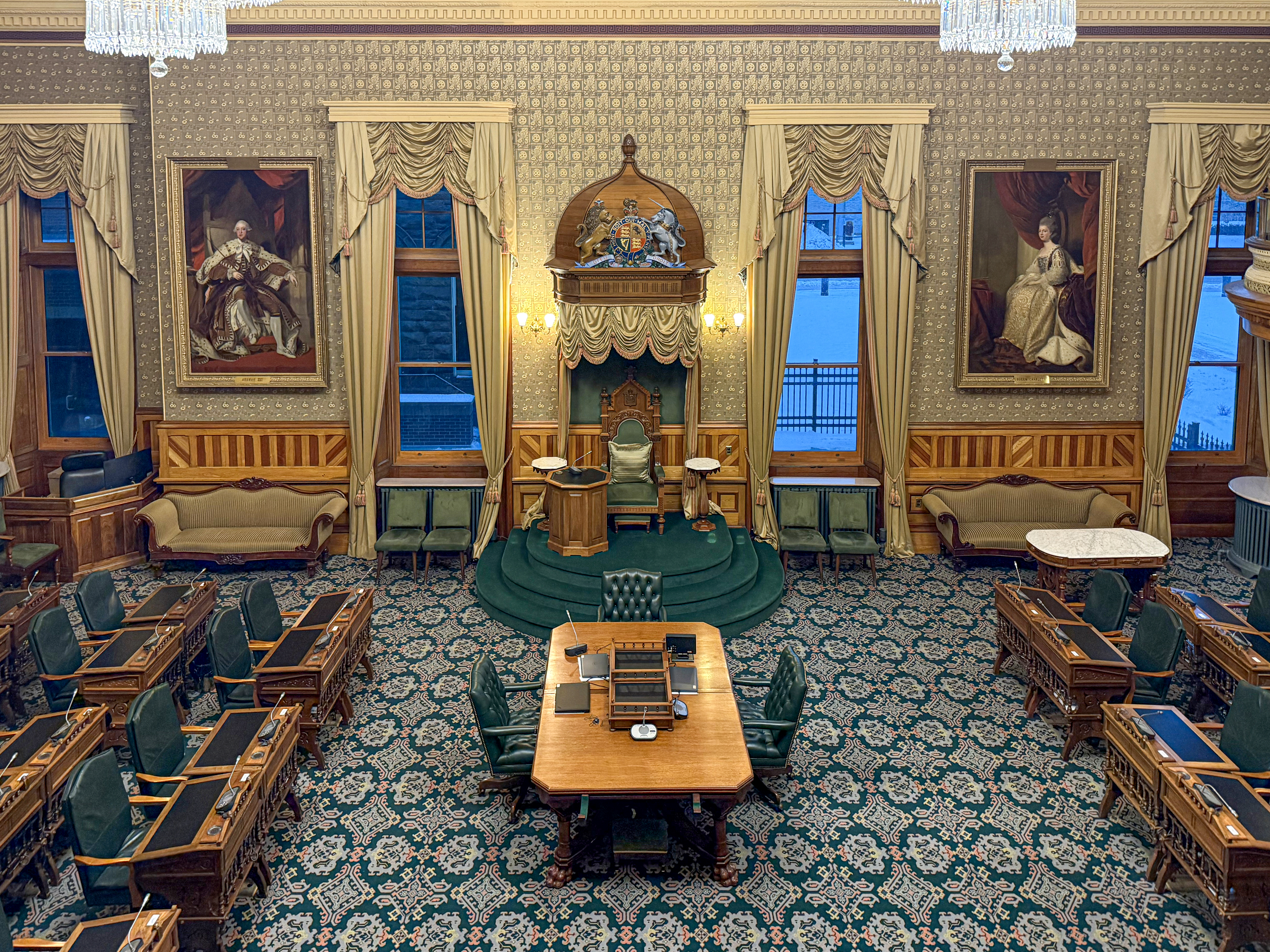
Legislative Assembly Chamber in 2026

The present Legislative Building was commissioned following the destruction of the former legislature by fire in 1877. After a design competition, the project was awarded to architect J.C. Dumaresq, whose proposal reflected the Second Empire style that had become prominent in Canadian public architecture during the late 19th century.

The building opened in 1882 and was constructed using Dorchester sandstone and Spoon Island granite sourced from the Gagetown area. Dumaresq's design provided accommodation for the Legislative Assembly and Legislative Council chambers, a Supreme Court chamber, and a legislative library, the latter arranged at the rear in the form of a Roman basilica. The exterior composition is defined by corner pavilions, a slightly projecting pedimented central bay, and a prominent central cupola rising to approximately 144 feet (44 m).

Architectural ornamentation includes Corinthian columns, carved stone representations of Indigenous figures wearing feathered headdresses, and a carved stone likeness of Queen Victoria above the main entrance. Interior features include a self-supporting spiral staircase and a richly decorated Assembly Chamber with Irish crystal and brass chandeliers, Japanesque-patterned wallpaper popular in the 1880s, and a wraparound public gallery. A statue of Britannia holding a trident crowns the upper roof, symbolizing Britain's maritime power at the time of the building's construction.

The building is home to:

- Legislative Assembly Chamber
- Legislative Assembly Office
- Legislative Council Chamber – now used for committee meetings
- Office of the Speaker
- Office of the Clerk
- Legislative Library
