= Aldéa Landry =

Canadian politician

The Honourable Aldéa Landry PC, CM, KC
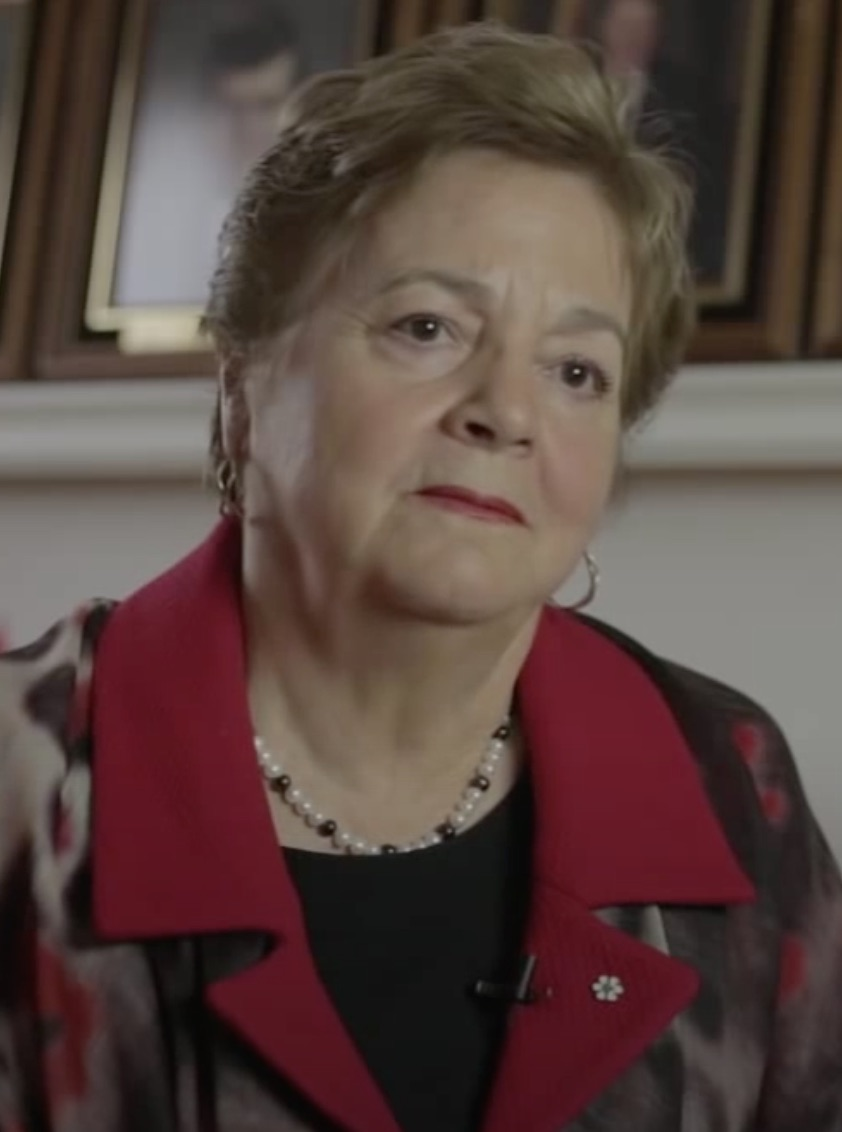

Chancellor of Université Sainte-Anne
- In office November 19, 2011 – November 1, 2019
- Preceded by: Louis Deveau
- Succeeded by: Nöel Després

Member of the New Brunswick Legislative Assembly for Shippagan-les-Îles
- In office 1987–1991
- Preceded by: Jean Gauvin
- Succeeded by: Jean Gauvin

Personal details
- Born: December 27, 1945 (age 80) Sainte-Cécile, New Brunswick
- Party: Liberal

Marie-Marthe Aldéa Landry, PC CM KC (born December 27, 1945) is a lawyer and business woman in the Canadian province of New Brunswick who has been a civil servant, legal practitioner in the private sector, and a politician and cabinet minister. She was the first Acadian woman named as a cabinet minister in New Brunswick, where she served as deputy premier from 1987 to 1991.

== Early life and education ==
She was born Marie-Marthe Aldéa Lanteigne in Sainte-Cécile, New Brunswick. Landry received a Bachelor of Arts degree from the Université de Moncton and a Bachelor of Laws from the University of New Brunswick. She graduated from the Directors Education Program offered by the ICD Corporate Governance College and the Rotman's School of Business, as well as of the Governance Essentials for Directors of Non-Profit Organizations and of the Financial Literacy Program for Directors and Executives.

== Career ==
From 1971 to 1975, Landry was legal counsel with the New Brunswick Department of Justice working on the 1973 Revised Statutes of New Brunswick Project. From 1975 to 1977, Landry served as Director of Legal Translation and Computerization for the New Brunswick Department of Justice. From 1977 to 1987, she worked in private practice at the law firm of Tremblay, Landry, Landry.

From 1987 to 1991 in the first term of the McKenna government she was deputy premier. She also held several other cabinet positions during this period: minister responsible for intergovernmental affairs 1987-88, acting Minister of Fisheries and Aquaculture 1988-89, and acting Minister of Housing in 1991.

In 1993, Landry became President of Landal Inc. since 1993, offering integrated services in organizational and business development, and in International Cooperation. She is vice-president of Diversis Inc., specializing in immigration and diversity, a co-owner of Boutique ProWeb, a specialist in e-commerce and e-marketing, and a partner/investor in several start-ups.

Landry is a former chair of the Atlantic Provinces Economic Council and was a member of the Board of Directors of the Bank of Canada from 1995 to 2005 and of the Security Intelligence Review Committee from 2005 to 2008. She served as Chair of the Vitalité Health Network, the New Brunswick Healthcare Association, and as director of the Canadian Healthcare Association, the Canadian Investors Protection Fund, Norbord Inc., Fraser Papers Ltd., Twin River Papers Ltd., The Shaw Group Ltd., Moosehead Brewery Advisory Board, as well as the Wind Energy Institute of Canada.

She presently sits on the board of directors and advisory boards of several corporations, and national and community organisations, including, The Bragg Group of Companies, The Bennett Group of Companies, Thunder Bay Regional Health Sciences Centre, Populus Global Solutions Ltd., Accreditation Canada and Accreditation Canada International, Desjardins General Insurance Group, the Canadian University of Dubai, the Desjardins Movement and Desjardins Financial Pancanadian Advisory Committee and is Chancellor of Université Sainte-Anne, in Nova Scotia.

== Awards and recognition ==
Appointed Queen's Counsel in 1987 (Q.C.) (which changed to K.C. upon the death of Queen Elizabeth II & the accession of King Charles III on 8 September 2022), and to the Privy Council of Canada in 2005 (P.C.). She was awarded the Order of Canada in 2006 (C.M.), and received The Queen Elizabeth II Diamond Jubilee Medal in 2012. She holds honorary Doctorate degrees from four universities. In 2003, she was chosen by Progress Magazine as one of 20 Atlantic Canadians who represent the spirit of progress in Atlantic Canada. She was also recipient, in 2009, of the prix Muriel Fergusson Award created by the Greater Moncton Chamber of Commerce to recognize outstanding women in business and leadership roles. In 2009 and in 2010, she was named Top 100: Canada's Most Powerful Women by the Women's Executive Network. She is the first recipient of the Brunswick Muriel Corkery-Ryan Women Lawyers Forum Leadership award. In 2013, she was inducted in the New Brunswick Business Hall of Fame and was awarded the Order of Moncton in 2014.

== Notes ==
New Brunswick provincial government of Frank McKenna
Cabinet posts (4)
Predecessor	Office	Successor
?	President of the Executive Council; 1987–1991	Frank McKenna
none	Minister of Intergovernmental Affairs; 1987–1991 new designation	Edmond Blanchard
?	Minister of Housing; 1991 (acting)	?
Doug Young	Minister of Fisheries; 1988–1989 (acting)	Denis Losier
Special Cabinet Responsibilities
Predecessor	Title	Successor
none	Deputy Premier; 1987–1991	Marcelle Mersereau
