= List of current legislative speakers of Canada =

Current speakers of Canadian legislative bodies

In Canadian politics, a speaker (French: président) is a member of a legislative body who presides over their respective assembly. In most cases the position is based on the United Kingdom's speaker of the House of Commons, whose job in the Westminster parliamentary system is to ensure parliamentary procedure is conducted properly, and in an orderly fashion. This includes choosing which members are permitted to speak and when, as well as disciplining members who breach parliamentary rules, such as members not respecting decorum.

Unlike the British system, speakers in Canada are not made to resign from their respective political parties upon assuming the office of speaker, although they are still expected to perform the duties of their role impartially. This has led speakers to occasionally be referred to as parliamentary referees. In the House of Commons and the legislative assemblies of the provinces and territories, the speaker does not vote on motions or legislation except in the case of a tie, in which case they are bound by the constitutional convention of Speaker Denison's rule to vote in favour of maintaining the status quo. The speaker of the Senate however is not bound by such rules, and is entitled to vote on all motions and legislation. The speaker of the Senate's appointment is also unique, as they are appointed by the governor general on the advice of the prime minister, rather than being elected internally by the incumbent members of the assembly.

At the municipal level, almost all municipal councils have the municipality's mayor serve as the presiding officer of a municipal council. The one exception to this rule is in the city of Toronto, where Toronto City Council elects a separate speaker to preside over council meetings instead of the mayor.

== List of current speakers ==
Current speakers of Canadian legislative bodies
Portrait	Speaker	House/Assembly	Order	Party	Incumbency	First mandate began	Terms
	Francis Scarpaleggia	House of Commons of Canada	40th	Liberal	1 year, 149 days	May 26, 2025	45th Parliament
	Raymonde Gagné	Senate of Canada	46th	Independent	3 years, 163 days	May 12, 2023	44th Parliament; 45th Parliament
	Ric McIver	Legislative Assembly of Alberta	15th	United Conservative	1 year, 162 days	May 13, 2025	31st Legislature
	Raj Chouhan	Legislative Assembly of British Columbia	40th	New Democratic	5 years, 319 days	December 7, 2020	42nd Parliament; 43rd Parliament
No image	Tom Lindsey	Legislative Assembly of Manitoba	31st	New Democratic	2 years, 347 days	November 9, 2023	43rd Legislature
	Francine Landry	Legislative Assembly of New Brunswick	61st	Liberal	1 year, 337 days	November 19, 2024	61st Legislature
No image	Paul Lane	Newfoundland and Labrador House of Assembly	45th	Independent	353 days	November 3, 2025	51st General Assembly
No image	Danielle Barkhouse	Nova Scotia House of Assembly	55th	Progressive Conservative	2 years, 47 days	September 5, 2024	64th General Assembly; 65th General Assembly
	Donna Skelly	Legislative Assembly of Ontario	43rd	Progressive Conservative	1 year, 191 days	April 14, 2025	44th Parliament
No image	Sidney MacEwen	Legislative Assembly of Prince Edward Island	34th	Progressive Conservative	1 year, 211 days	March 25, 2025	67th General Assembly
No image	Vacant	National Assembly of Quebec	—				
No image	Todd Goudy	Legislative Assembly of Saskatchewan	29th	Saskatchewan Party	1 year, 331 days	November 25, 2024	30th Legislature
No image	Shane Thompson	Legislative Assembly of the Northwest Territories	16th	N/A (consensus government)	2 years, 319 days	December 7, 2023	20th Legislative Assembly
No image	David Joanasie	Legislative Assembly of Nunavut	13th	N/A (consensus government)	338 days	November 18, 2025	7th Legislature
No image	Yvonne Clarke	Yukon Legislative Assembly	31st	Yukon Party	318 days	December 8, 2025	36th Legislature
	Frances Nunziata	Toronto City Council	2nd	Independent (Note: Municipal political parties are not recognized by Elections Ontario or the City of Toronto.)	15 years, 325 days	December 1, 2010	2010–2014 term 2014–2018 term 2018–2022 term 2022–2026 term

== See also ==
- List of current first ministers of Canada
- List of mayors in Canada
