= Department of Fisheries (New Brunswick) =

Government department in New Brunswick, Canada

Agency overview
- Formed: 1963
- Jurisdiction: New Brunswick
- Parent department: Government of New Brunswick

The Department of Fisheries is a department in the Government of New Brunswick, Canada. It is responsible for management of the Province's fisheries.

From 1882, fisheries was the responsibility of the Department of Agriculture until 1963 when the government of Premier Louis Robichaud created a separate Department of Fisheries and appointed Ernest Richard its minister.The department would be renamed the Department of Fisheries & Aquaculture which in 2000 was merged with the Department of Agriculture and Rural Development to become the Department of Agriculture, Fisheries and Aquaculture. This department lasted until October 3, 2006 when Premier Shawn Graham split the departments into the Department of Agriculture and Aquaculture and reestablished the separate Department of Fisheries.

== Ministers ==
#	Minister	Term	Administration of:
1.	Ernest Richard	July 8, 1963 – 12 Nov 1970	Louis Robichaud
2.	G. W. N. Cockburn	November 12, 1970 – December 3, 1974	Richard Hatfield
3.	Omer Leger	December 3, 1974 – November 21, 1978	Richard Hatfield
4.	Jean Gauvin	November 21, 1978 – October 3, 1985	Richard Hatfield
5.	James N. Tucker, Jr.	October 3, 1985 – October 27, 1987	Richard Hatfield
6.	Doug Young	October 27, 1987– October 3, 1988	Frank McKenna
7.	Aldea Landry (interim)	October 3, 1988 – June 15, 1989	Frank McKenna
8.	Denis Losier	June 15, 1989 – October 9, 1991	Frank McKenna
9.	Camille Theriault	October 9, 1991 – April 27, 1994	Frank McKenna
10.	Bernard Theriault	April 27, 1994 – July 23, 1997	Ray Frenette
11.	Danny Gay	July 23, 1997– June 21, 1999	Frenette & Thériault
12.	Paul Robichaud	June 21, 1999 – March 23, 2000	Bernard Lord
13.	Rick Doucet	October 3, 2006 – 2010	Shawn Graham
