= 2022 New Brunswick Liberal Association leadership election =

- Date: August 6, 2022
- Convention: Fredericton, New Brunswick
- Resigning leader: Kevin Vickers
- Won by: Susan Holt
- Ballots: 3
- Candidates: 4

The New Brunswick Liberal Association held a leadership convention on August 6, 2022, in Fredericton, New Brunswick, as a result of Kevin Vickers' announcement on September 14, 2020, that he was resigning as party leader. Vickers resignation followed the outcome of the 2020 New Brunswick general election which saw the Progressive Conservative party, under Blaine Higgs, form a majority government and the Liberal Party lose three seats. The deadline for candidates to file their intention to run for the leadership was June 15, 2022. Voting by party members for the leadership occurred at a free in-person convention as well as remotely via phone and internet connected device and used a ranked ballot system.

Susan Holt was elected leader on the third ballot.

== Candidates ==
=== Qualified ===
==== Donald Arseneault ====
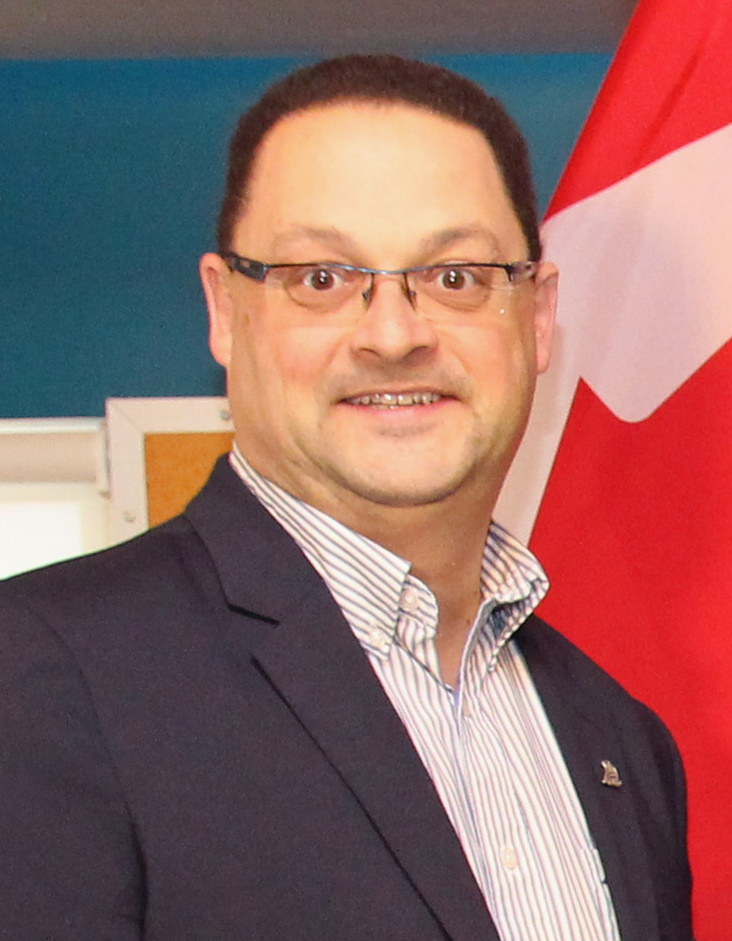
Donald Arseneault

Donald Arseneault was the MLA for Campbellton-Dalhousie (2014–2017) and for Dalhousie-Restigouche East (2003–2014). He served as Minister of Post-Secondary Education, Training and Labour (2008–2010, 2016–2017), Minister of Intergovernmental Affairs (2016–2017), Minister of Energy and Mines (2014–2016), Deputy Premier (2010), and Minister of Natural Resources (2006–2008).

Candidacy announced: October 28, 2021
Campaign website: www.donaldarseneault.ca

==== Robert Gauvin ====
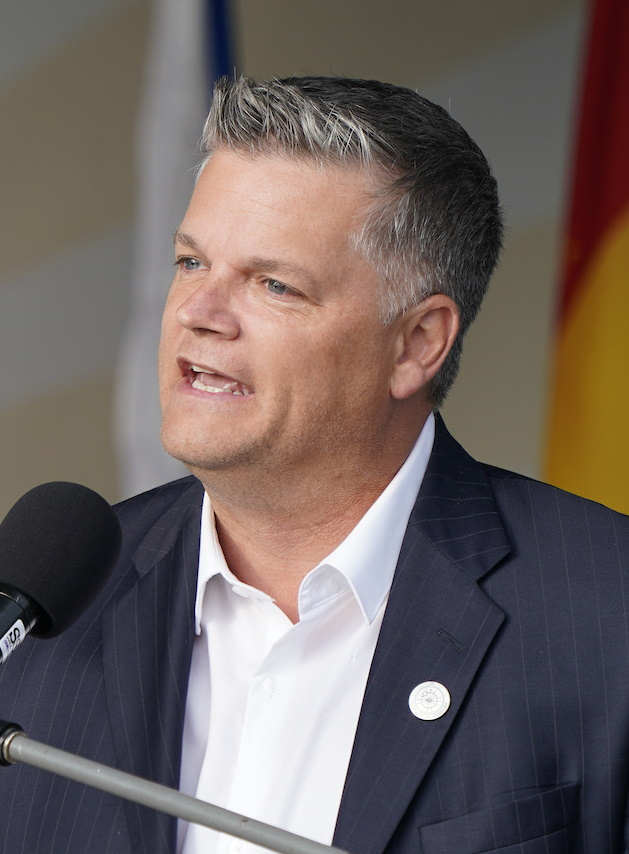
Robert Gauvin

Robert Gauvin is the MLA for Shediac Bay-Dieppe (2020–present) and was previously the MLA for Shippagan-Lamèque-Miscou (2018–2020). Elected in 2018 as a Progressive Conservative, he served in the Higgs government as Deputy Premier (2018–2020), Minister of Tourism, Heritage and Culture, and Minister responsible for La Francophonie (2018–2020) before resigning from cabinet and the PC caucus in February 2020 in protest of the government's health reforms.

Candidacy announced: January 30, 2022
Campaign website:

==== T. J. Harvey ====
T. J. Harvey was the MP for Tobique—Mactaquac (2015–2019).

Candidacy announced: June 19, 2021
Campaign website: tjharvey.ca

==== Susan Holt ====
Susan Holt is a Fredericton tech executive, the former President of the New Brunswick Business Council, and a former advisor to Premier Brian Gallant. In 2018, Holt ran for the Liberals in Fredericton South, losing to Green leader David Coon. Holt is the first woman to ever run for the New Brunswick Liberal leadership.

Candidacy announced: February 14, 2022
Campaign website: www.susanholt.ca

=== Withdrew or failed to qualify ===
==== Seamus Byrne ====
Seamus Byrne is a Saint John businessperson. After being the frontrunner for most of the campaign, Byrne failed to meet the May 2 deadline to pay the $30,000 entrance fee and submit the required 50 signatures of Liberal members willing to support him and was disqualified from the race. Byrne fought the ruling, claiming that the requirements were anti-democratic, and the Greenlighting Appeal Committee agreed with Byrne's position, and therefore, on May 17 granted his campaign a two-day extension to submit the entrance fee and signatures. The main issue was that Byrne had initially paid the $30,000 entrance personally and he did not have the time to source the funds from third parties during the two-day extension period. As a result, Byrne suspended his campaign on May 20. Early in the campaign, Byrne published a 15-point policy plan for New Brunswick. This plan has now been adopted by the Liberal Party of New Brunswick and will form the policy basis of the next Liberal governments in New Brunswick. Byrne expressed his intention to continue in politics in New Brunswick in the future.

Candidacy announced: December 17, 2021
Candidacy suspended: May 20, 2022
Campaign website:

=== Declined ===
- Roger Melanson (Interim leader, MLA for Dieppe)

== Results ==
Results are in percentage of points with 100 points allotted to each of 49 ridings, with a total of 4,900 points available in the election. A preferential ballot was used.

=== Ballots ===
2022 NBLA leadership ballot (%)
Candidate	First Ballot	Second Ballot	Third Ballot
Susan Holt	32.12	39.58	51.67
T. J. Harvey	33.9	36.76	48.33
Robert Gauvin	19.76	23.67	Eliminated
Donald Arseneault	14.22	Eliminated	
