= Paul Robichaud =

Canadian politician

Deputy Premier of New Brunswick
- In office 12 October 2010 – 7 October 2014
- Premier: David Alward
- Preceded by: Donald Arseneault
- Succeeded by: Stephen Horsman

Minister of Natural Resources
- In office 23 October 2013 – 7 October 2014
- Premier: David Alward
- Preceded by: Bruce Northrup
- Succeeded by: Denis Landry

Minister of Economic Development
- In office 12 October 2010 – 23 September 2013
- Premier: David Alward
- Preceded by: Victor Boudreau
- Succeeded by: Bruce Fitch

Minister of Transportation
- In office 27 June 2003 – 3 October 2006
- Premier: Bernard Lord
- Preceded by: Percy Mockler
- Succeeded by: Denis Landry

Minister of Tourism and Parks
- In office 9 October 2001 – 27 June 2003
- Premier: Bernard Lord
- Preceded by: Position Established
- Succeeded by: Joan MacAlpine-Stiles

Minister of Fisheries and Aquaculture
- In office 21 June 1999 – 9 October 2001
- Premier: Bernard Lord
- Preceded by: Danny Gay
- Succeeded by: Rodney Weston

Member of the New Brunswick Legislative Assembly for Lamèque-Shippagan-Miscou
- In office June 7, 1999 – September 22, 2014
- Preceded by: Jean-Camille DeGrâce
- Succeeded by: Wilfred Roussel

Personal details
- Born: May 6, 1964 (age 62) Tracadie, New Brunswick
- Party: Progressive Conservative

Paul Robichaud (born May 6, 1964 in Tracadie, New Brunswick) is a politician in the province of New Brunswick, Canada.

He studied at the Shippagan, New Brunswick campus of the University of Moncton. A member of the Progressive Conservative Party since 1985, he first ran for office in the 1995 but was defeated. He served from then until the next election as a Francophone organizer for the PC Party and ran again in 1999 when he was successful becoming the member of the Legislative Assembly of New Brunswick for Lamèque-Shippagan-Miscou. He was re-elected in 2003, 2006 and 2010.

He joined the cabinet first as Minister of Fisheries & Aquaculture and then became minister of the enlarged Department of Agriculture, Fisheries and Aquaculture. In a cabinet shuffle in 2001 he became Minister of Tourism & Parks a post he maintained until after the 2003 election when he took over the post of transportation.

He left the cabinet in 2006 as the Liberals won that year's election and formed the government.
