= List of current first ministers of Canada =

List of premiers by province

Canada is a federation that comprises ten provinces and three territories. Its government is structured as a constitutional monarchy and a parliamentary democracy, with a monarch as its sovereign and a prime minister as its head of government. Each of the country's provinces and territories also has a head of government, called premier in Canadian English. Collectively, the federal Prime Minister and provincial and territorial premiers are referred to as first ministers. In Canadian French, the term premier ministre is used in both the federal and provincial/territorial contexts.

The longest-serving current first minister is Scott Moe of Saskatchewan, who assumed office on February 2, 2018; the newest first minister is Lorne Doerkson of British Columbia, who assumed office on November 20, 2026. The oldest first minister, Tony Wakeham of Newfoundland and Labrador, is 70; the youngest first minister, Currie Dixon of Yukon, is 41. Of the current first ministers, two (Danielle Smith of Alberta and Susan Holt of New Brunswick) are women and two (Wab Kinew of Manitoba and R. J. Simpson of the Northwest Territories) are Indigenous. (Note: Kinew is Ojibwe from Ojibways of Onigaming First Nation and Simpson is Métis.)

Eight first ministers are from broadly right-leaning parties, (Note: "Progressive Conservative" parties in Newfoundland and Labrador, Nova Scotia, Ontario, and Prince Edward Island, as well as the Conservative Party in British Columbia, the Saskatchewan Party in Saskatchewan, the United Conservative Party in Alberta and the Yukon Party in Yukon.) two are from broadly centrist "Liberal" parties, one is from a broadly left-leaning "New Democratic" party, and one is from a separatist party. The premiers of the Northwest Territories and Nunavut are non-partisan within consensus government systems.

== Current first ministers of Canada ==
Premiers are listed in accordance with the provincial order of precedence: provinces before territories, and by order of joining confederation within those categories; where multiple jurisdictions joined confederation in the same year, they are ordered by population at the time of joining. Incumbency is current as of November 20, 2026.

Portrait	First minister	Jurisdiction	Order	Party	Incumbency	First mandate began	Current mandate began	Renewal of Mandate	Parlia- ment
	Mark Carney	Canada	24th	Liberal Party of Canada	1 year, 251 days	2025 designation	2025 election	Next election	45th
	Doug Ford	Ontario	26th	Progressive Conservative Party of Ontario	8 years, 144 days	2018 election	2025 election	2029 election	44th
	Paul St-Pierre Plamondon	Quebec	34th	Parti Québécois	30 days	2026 election		Next election	44th
	Tim Houston	Nova Scotia	30th	Progressive Conservative Association of Nova Scotia	5 years, 81 days	2021 election	2024 election	2028 election	65th
	Susan Holt	New Brunswick	35th	New Brunswick Liberal Association	2 years, 18 days	2024 election		2028 election	61st
	Wab Kinew	Manitoba	25th	New Democratic Party of Manitoba	3 years, 33 days	2023 election		2027 election	43rd
	Lorne Doerkson	British Columbia	38th	Conservative Party of British Columbia	0 days	2026 election		2030 election	44th
	Rob Lantz	Prince Edward Island	34th	Progressive Conservative Party of Prince Edward Island	284 days	2026 designation (Note: Lantz's second appointment as premier; he previously held office February 21 – December 12, 2025.)		2027 election	67th
	Scott Moe	Saskatchewan	15th	Saskatchewan Party	8 years, 291 days	2018 designation	2024 election	2028 election	30th
	Danielle Smith	Alberta	19th	United Conservative Party	4 years, 40 days	2022 designation	2023 election	2027 election	31st
	Tony Wakeham	Newfoundland and Labrador	16th	Progressive Conservative Party of Newfoundland and Labrador	1 year, 22 days	2025 election		2029 election	51st
	R. J. Simpson	Northwest Territories	14th	N/A (consensus government)	2 years, 347 days	2023 designation		2027 election	20th
	Currie Dixon	Yukon	12th	Yukon Party	363 days	2025 election		2029 election	36th
	John Main	Nunavut	7th	N/A (consensus government)	1 year, 0 days	2025 designation		2029 election	7th

== See also ==
- Lists of Canadian senators
- Lists of members of the Canadian House of Commons
- Timeline of Canadian elections
- List of Asian-Canadian first ministers
- List of female first ministers in Canada
- Deputy Premier (Canada)
