= Department of Agriculture (New Brunswick) =

Former agriculture ministry of New Brunswick (province of Canada)

The Department of Agriculture was a department in the Government of New Brunswick, Canada. It was responsible for management of the Province's Agriculture industries. The member of the Executive Council responsible for the department was initially called the Commissioner of Agriculture, who issued annual reports.

The department would become known as the Department of Agriculture and Rural Development in the late 1990s.

From 1882, the Department of Agriculture was also responsible for fisheries until 1963 when the government of Premier Louis Robichaud created a separate Department of Fisheries. This department would be renamed the Department of Fisheries & Aquaculture which in 2000 was merged with the Department of Agriculture and Rural Development to become the Department of Agriculture, Fisheries and Aquaculture. This department lasted until October 3, 2006, when Premier Shawn Graham split the departments into the Department of Agriculture and Aquaculture and reestablished the separate Department of Fisheries.

== Ministers ==
#	Minister	Term	Administration of:
1.	George J. Colter	May 5, 1882 - February 26, 1883	Daniel Lionel Hanington
2.	William Elder	1883 - 1883	Andrew George Blair
3.	James Mitchell	February, 1890–1897	Andrew George Blair
4.	Charles H. LaBillois	July 1897 - 1900	Henry Emmerson
5.	Lauchlin P. Farris	September 1, 1900 - March 20, 1908	Tweedie/ Pugsley/Robinson
6.	David V. Landry	1908–1914	J. D. Hazen/J. K. Flemming
7.	James A. Murray	January 22, 1914 – 1917	George J. Clarke
8.	J. F. Tweedale	April 4, 1917 - December 21, 1920	Walter Foster
9.	D. W. Mersereau	December 21, 1920 - September 20, 1925	Foster/Veniot
10.	Lewis Smith	September 20, 1925 - 12 July 1935	Baxter/Richards/Tilley
11.	Austin C. Taylor	July 16, 1935 - October 8, 1952	A. Dysart/J. B. McNair
12.	Cyril B. Sherwood	October 8, 1952 - July 12, 1960	Hugh John Flemming
13.	J. Adrien Levesque	July 12, 1960 - November 12, 1970	Louis Robichaud
14.	A. Edison Stairs	November 12, 1970 - July 18, 1972	Richard Hatfield
15.	J. Stewart Brooks	July 18, 1972 - February 21, 1973	Richard Hatfield
16.	George E. Horton	February 21, 1973 - December 3, 1974	Richard Hatfield
17.	Malcolm MacLeod	December 3, 1974 - February 13, 1985	Richard Hatfield
18.	Hazen Myers	October 3, 1985 - October 27, 1987	Richard Hatfield
19.	Alan R. Graham	October 27, 1987 - October 9, 1991	Frank McKenna
20.	Gérald Clavette	October 9, 1991 - April 25, 1994	Frank McKenna
21.	Doug Tyler	April 28, 1994 - May 14, 1998	Ray Frenette
22.	Stuart Jamieson	May 14, 1998 - June 21, 1999	Camille Thériault
23.	Milton Sherwood	June 21, 1999 - March 23, 2000	Bernard Lord
