= Wilfred Roussel =

Canadian politician

Wilfred Roussel MLA
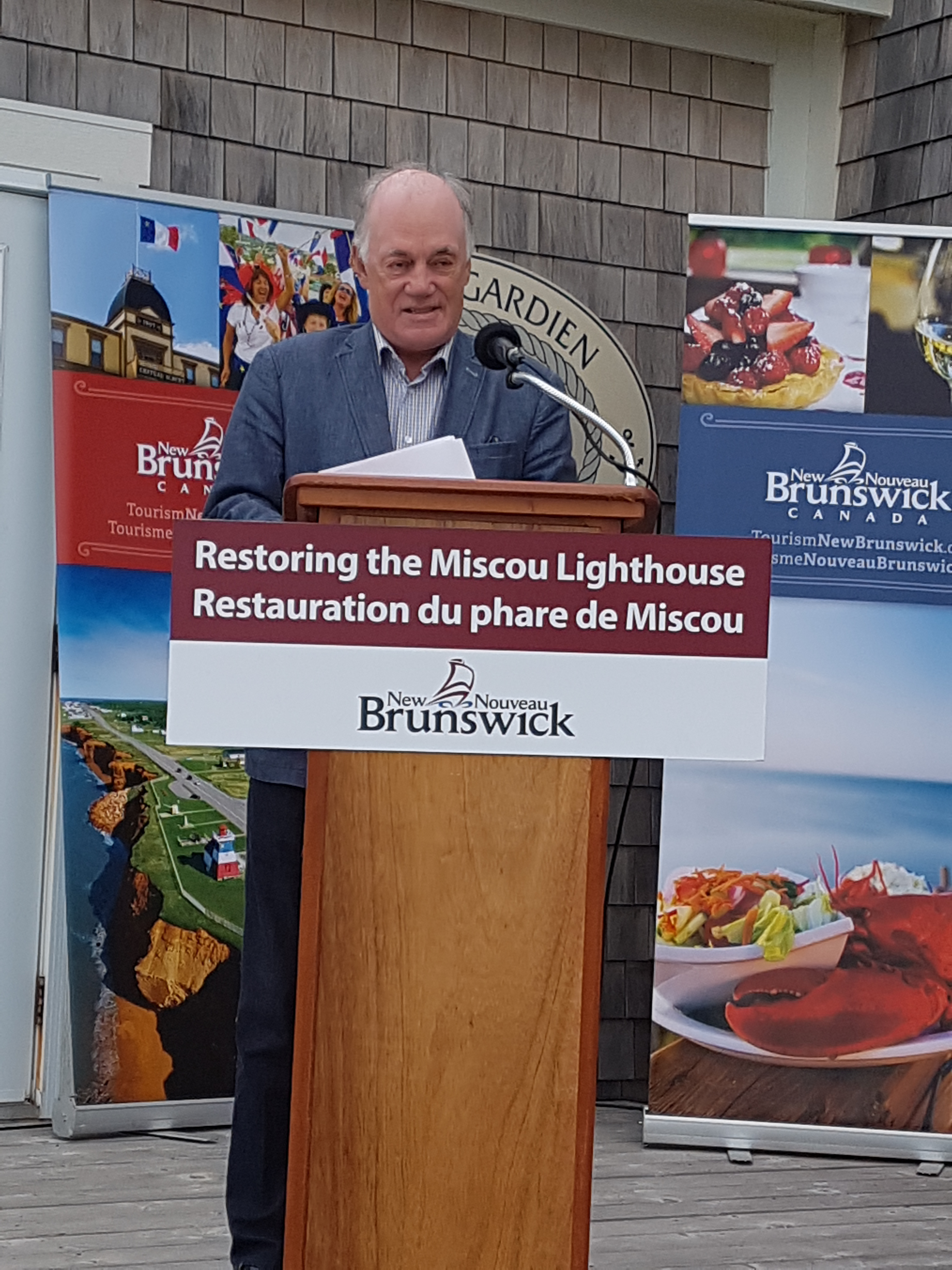

Member of the New Brunswick Legislative Assembly for Shippagan-Lamèque-Miscou
- In office September 22, 2014 – 2018
- Preceded by: Paul Robichaud
- Succeeded by: Robert Gauvin

Personal details
- Party: Green (2024-present)
- Other political affiliations: Liberal (2014-18)

Wilfred Roussel is a Canadian politician, who was elected to the Legislative Assembly of New Brunswick in the 2014 provincial election. He represented the electoral district of Shippagan-Lamèque-Miscou as a member of the Liberal Party from 2014 to 2018.

He was the Green Party candidate for Shippagan-Les-Îles in the 2024 New Brunswick general election, but was defeated by Liberal candidate Eric Mallet.

New Brunswick provincial government of Brian Gallant
Cabinet post (1)
Predecessor	Office	Successor
Andrew Harvey	Minister of Agriculture, Mines and Rural Affairs; May 11, 2018–November 9, 2019	Ross Wetmore
