= Robert Gauvin =

Canadian politician

Robert Gauvin MLA
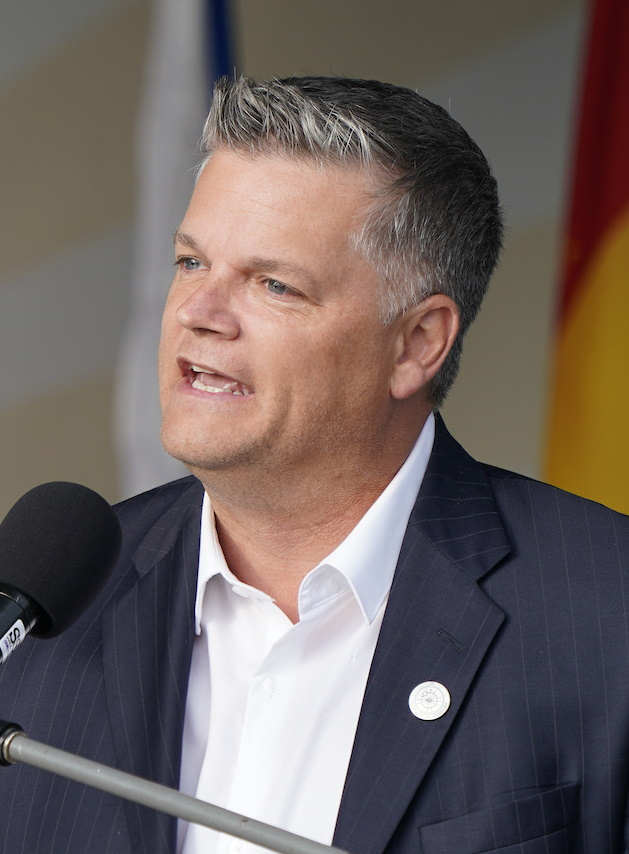

Deputy Premier of New Brunswick
- In office November 9, 2018 – February 14, 2020
- Premier: Blaine Higgs
- Preceded by: Stephen Horsman

Minister of Tourism, Heritage, and Culture
- In office November 9, 2018 – February 14, 2020
- Premier: Blaine Higgs
- Preceded by: Gilles LePage
- Succeeded by: Bruce Fitch

Member of the New Brunswick Legislative Assembly for Shediac Bay-Dieppe
- Incumbent
- Assumed office September 14, 2020
- Preceded by: Brian Gallant

Member of the New Brunswick Legislative Assembly for Shippagan-Lamèque-Miscou
- In office September 24, 2018 – August 17, 2020
- Preceded by: Wilfred Roussel
- Succeeded by: Eric Mallet

Personal details
- Born: 1968 (age 57–58) Caraquet, New Brunswick
- Party: Liberal (2020–present)
- Other political affiliations: Independent (Feb–Aug 2020) Progressive Conservative (until 2020)
- Spouse: Émilie LaBranche
- Parent: Jean Gauvin (father)

Robert Gauvin is a Canadian politician who was elected to the Legislative Assembly of New Brunswick in the 2018 New Brunswick general election. He currently represents the riding of Shediac Bay-Dieppe as a member of the New Brunswick Liberal Association.

== Political career ==
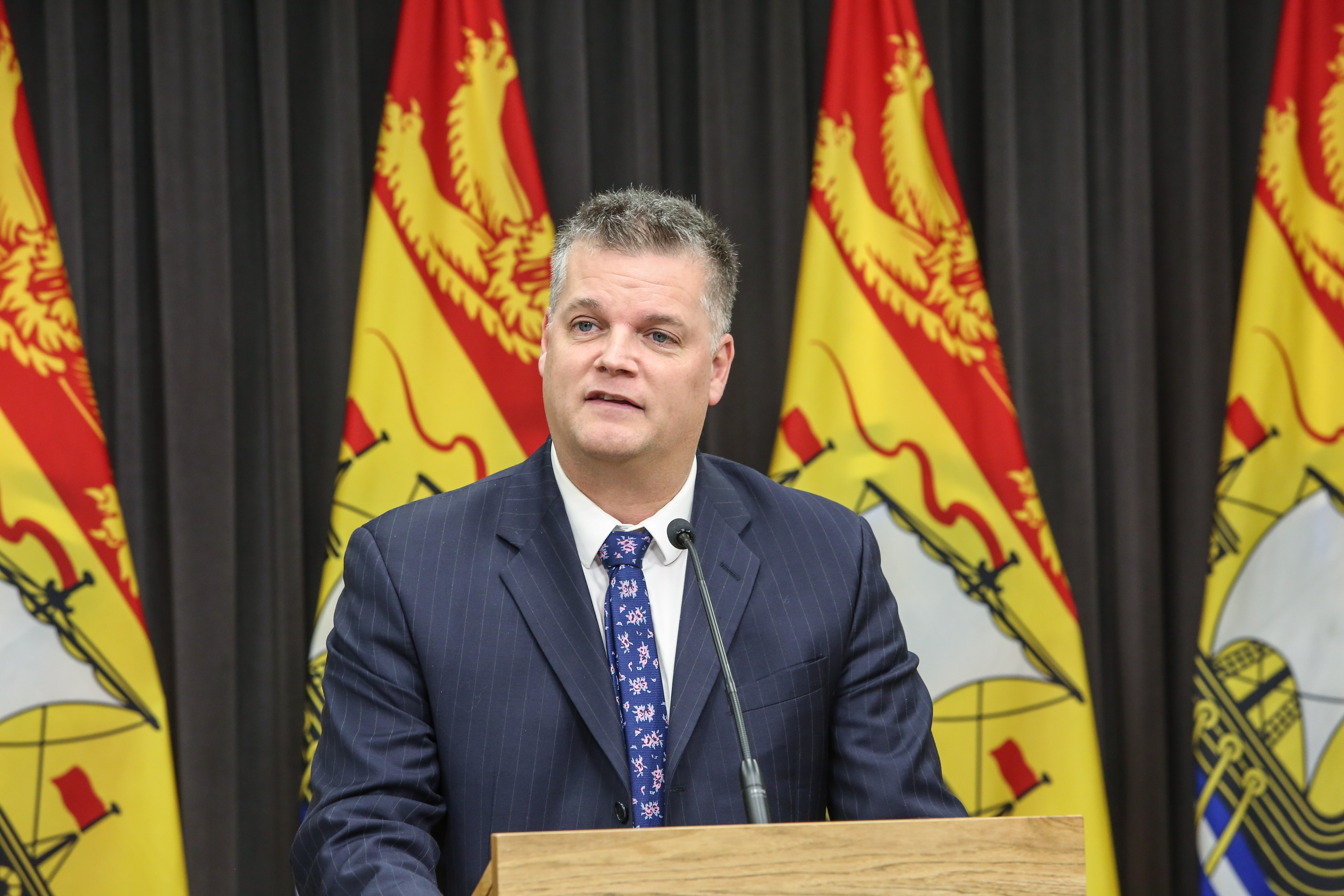
Gauvin in 2019

Gauvin was first elected in the 2018 election as the Progressive Conservative MLA for Shippagan-Lamèque-Miscou. The Progressive Conservatives formed a minority government after the election, at which point Blaine Higgs appointed Gauvin to the Executive Council of New Brunswick as Deputy Premier, Minister of Tourism, Heritage, and Culture, and Minister responsible for La Francophonie.

On February 14, 2020, he resigned from cabinet and the Progressive Conservative caucus to sit as an independent MLA, citing Higgs' health reforms, including the nighttime closure of six hospital emergency rooms; in announcing his resignation, Gauvin called those reforms "an attack on rural New Brunswick."

On August 18, 2020, ahead of the 2020 election, he announced he was joining the Liberal Party and would run as their in Shediac Bay-Dieppe, a riding previously represented by former Liberal Premier Brian Gallant. He was re-elected in 2020, in which Higgs' Progressive Conservatives won a majority government.

On January 30, 2022, Gauvin announced his campaign for leader of the New Brunswick Liberal Association following Kevin Vickers' 2020 resignation. The election took place on August 6, 2022, and Gauvin was eliminated on the second round of balloting, finishing third in the contest.

As of September 8, 2024, he serves as the Official Opposition critic for Social Development, Rural Affairs, and Seniors and Long-Term Care.

Gauvin was re-elected in the 2024 general election. On November 1, 2024, it was announced that he was placed on the cabinet as Minister of Public Safety and Minister responsible for la Francophonie.

== Personal life ==
Gauvin is the son of former New Brunswick MLA Jean Gauvin.

== Electoral history ==
2024 New Brunswick general election: Shediac Bay-Dieppe
Party	Candidate	Votes	%	±%
Liberal	Robert Gauvin	6,530	68.1%	+7.96
Progressive Conservative	René Ephestion	1,803	18.8%	-11.80
Green	Chantal Landry	1,254	13.1%	
Total valid votes		9,587		
Total rejected ballots				
Turnout				
Eligible voters				
Liberal hold		Swing		
Source: Elections New Brunswick

2020 New Brunswick general election
Party	Candidate	Votes	%	±%
Liberal	Robert Gauvin	5,839	60.14	-6.95
Progressive Conservative	Mathieu Gérald Caissie	2,971	30.60	+15.87
New Democratic	Delphine Daigle	528	5.44	-2.88
People's Alliance	Phillip Coombes	371	3.82	
Total valid votes		9,709	100.00	
Total rejected ballots		54	0.55	+0.02
Turnout		9,763	71.49	+3.42
Eligible voters		13,657		
Liberal hold		Swing		-11.41
Source: Elections New Brunswick

2018 New Brunswick general election
Party	Candidate	Votes	%	±%
Progressive Conservative	Robert Gauvin	4,048	46.25	+0.65
Liberal	Wilfred Roussel	3,949	45.12	-0.98
New Democratic	Albert Rousselle	578	6.60	+0.90
Independent	Philippe Tisseuil	178	2.03	
Total valid votes		8,753	98.76	
Total rejected ballots		110	1.24	+0.90
Turnout		8,863	79.64	+2.91
Eligible voters		11,129		
Progressive Conservative gain from Liberal		Swing		+0.82
