= Department of Culture, Tourism and Healthy-Living (New Brunswick) =

Canadian provincial government organization

The Department of Culture, Tourism and Healthy-Living was briefly a part of the provincial government of New Brunswick, Canada. It was charged with the promotion of "wellness" through healthy living and physical activity, with administration of government programs for community arts development, heritage, and sport and recreation, the administration of provincial tourism marketing, and the administration of provincial parks.

The department was established on March 15, 2012, when Premier David Alward restructured government. It combined the former departments of Wellness, Culture and Sport and Tourism and Parks. However, it was split back in two with Tourism and Culture functions going to a new Department of Tourism, Heritage and Culture and wellness and sport functions going to a new Department of Healthy and Inclusive Communities in October 2012.

== Ministers ==
#	Minister	Term	Administration
1.	Trevor Holder*	March 15, 2012 - October 9, 2012	under David Alward

* Holder was previously minister of both of the forerunning departments, and was thereafter minister of the new department of Tourism, Heritage and Culture.
