= List of female political party leaders in Canada =

The following women have served as leaders of political parties represented in the House of Commons or a provincial legislature.

== Federal ==
Portrait	Name	Political party	Date assumed office	Date departed office	Duration	Highest position
	Audrey McLaughlin	New Democratic	5 December 1989	14 October 1995	5 years, 313 days	None
	Kim Campbell	Progressive Conservative	13 June 1993	14 December 1993	184 days	Prime Minister (1993)
	Alexa McDonough	New Democratic	14 October 1995	25 January 2003	7 years, 103 days	None
	Elsie Wayne (interim)	Progressive Conservative	2 April 1998	14 November 1998	226 days	None
	Deborah Grey (interim)	Canadian Alliance	27 March 2000	8 July 2000	103 days	Leader of the Opposition (2000)
	Elizabeth May	Green	26 August 2006	4 November 2019	13 years, 70 days	None
	Elizabeth May	Green	19 November 2022	14 November 2026	3 years, 360 days	None
	Vivian Barbot (interim)	Bloc Québécois	11 May 2011	11 December 2011	214 days	None
	Nycole Turmel (interim)	New Democratic	22 August 2011	24 March 2012	215 days	Leader of the Opposition (2011–2012)
	Rona Ambrose (interim)	Conservative	5 November 2015	27 May 2017	1 year, 203 days	Leader of the Opposition (2015–2017)
	Martine Ouellet	Bloc Québécois	14 March 2017	11 June 2018	1 year, 89 days	None
	Jo-Ann Roberts (interim)	Green	4 November 2019	3 October 2020	334 days	None
	Annamie Paul	Green	3 October 2020	14 November 2021	1 year, 42 days	None
	Candice Bergen (interim)	Conservative	2 February 2022	10 September 2022	220 days	Leader of the Opposition (2022)

== Alberta ==
Portrait	Name	Date assumed office	Date departed office	Duration	Political party	Highest position
	Bettie Hewes (interim)	1994	1994	?	Liberal	None
	Pam Barrett	8 September 1996	2 February 2000	3 years, 178 days	New Democratic	None
	Nancy MacBeth	18 April 1998	15 March 2001	2 years, 331 days	Liberal	Leader of the Opposition (1998–2001)
	Eleanor Maroes (interim)	2005	2005	?	Alberta Alliance	None
	Danielle Smith	17 October 2009	17 December 2014	5 years, 61 days	Wildrose	Leader of the Opposition (2012–2014)
	Alison Redford	1 October 2011	23 March 2014	2 years, 173 days	Progressive Conservative	Premier (2011–2014)
	Rachel Notley	18 October 2014	22 June 2024	9 years, 248 days	New Democratic	Premier (2015–2019)
	Heather Forsyth (interim)	22 December 2014	28 March 2015	96 days	Wildrose	Leader of the Opposition (2014–2015)
	Danielle Smith	6 October 2022	Incumbent	4 years, 47 days	United Conservative	Premier (2022–)

== British Columbia ==
Portrait	Name	Date assumed office	Date departed office	Duration	Political party	Highest position
	Rita Johnston	2 April 1991	7 March 1992	340 days	Social Credit	Premier (1991)
	Grace McCarthy (interim)	6 November 1993	May 1994	176 days	Social Credit	None (Note: Grace McCarthy served as deputy premier in the Bill Bennett and Vander Zalm ministries prior to becoming leader of the party.)
	Joy MacPhail (interim)	16 May 2001	23 November 2003	2 years, 191 days	New Democratic	Leader of the Opposition (2001–2005) (Note: Joy MacPhail served as deputy premier in the Dosanjh ministry prior to becoming leader of the party.)
	Carole James	23 November 2003	20 January 2011	7 years, 58 days	New Democratic	Leader of the Opposition (2005–2011) (Note: Carole James served as deputy premier in the Horgan ministry after her tenure as leader of the party.)
	Jane Sterk	2007	2013	?	Green	None
	Dawn Black (interim)	20 January 2011	17 April 2011	87 days	New Democratic	Leader of the Opposition (2011)
	Christy Clark	26 February 2011	4 August 2017	6 years, 159 days	Liberal	Premier (2011–2017)
	Sonia Furstenau	14 September 2020	28 January 2025	4 years, 167 days	Green	None
	Shirley Bond (interim)	23 November 2020	5 February 2022	1 year, 74 days	Liberal	Leader of the Opposition (2020–2022) (Note: Shirley Bond served as deputy premier in the Campbell ministry prior to becoming leader of the party.)
	Dallas Brodie (interim)	9 June 2025	Incumbent	1 year, 166 days	OneBC	None
	Emily Lowan	24 September 2025	Incumbent	1 year, 59 days	Green	None
	Kerry-Lynne Findlay	30 May 2026	20 September 2026	113 days	Conservative	None
	Elenore Sturko	22 September 2026	13 November 2026	52 days	Centre BC	None
	Jennifer Whiteside (interim)	29 October 2026	Incumbent	24 days	New Democratic	Leader of the Opposition (2026–)

== Manitoba ==
Portrait	Name	Date assumed office	Date departed office	Duration	Political party	Highest position
	Sharon Carstairs	4 March 1984	5 June 1993	9 years, 93 days	Liberal	Leader of the Opposition (1998–1990)
	Ginny Hasselfield	19 October 1996	17 October 1998	1 year, 363 days	Liberal	None
	Rana Bokhari	26 October 2013	24 September 2016	2 years, 334 days	Liberal	None
	Flor Marcelino (interim)	7 May 2016	16 September 2017	1 year, 132 days	New Democratic	Leader of the Opposition (2016–2017)
	Judy Klassen (interim)	21 October 2016	13 June 2017	235 days	Liberal	None
	Heather Stefanson	30 October 2021	15 January 2024	2 years, 77 days	Progressive Conservative	Premier (2021–2023)
	Cindy Lamoureux (interim)	17 October 2023	29 September 2025	1 year, 347 days	Liberal	None

== New Brunswick ==
Portrait	Name	Date assumed office	Date departed office	Duration	Political party	Highest position
	Shirley Dysart (interim)	1985	4 May 1985	?	Liberal	Leader of the Opposition (1985)
	Elizabeth Weir	1991	2003	?	New Democratic	None
	Susan Holt	6 August 2022	incumbent	4 years, 108 days	Liberal	Premier (2024–)

== Newfoundland and Labrador ==
Portrait	Name	Date assumed office	Date departed office	Duration	Political party	Highest position
	Lynn Verge (interim)	29 April 1995	1996	?	Progressive Conservative	None
	Lorraine Michael	28 May 2006	7 March 2015	283 days	New Democratic	None
	Yvonne Jones	13 November 2007	14 August 2011	3 years, 274 days	Liberal	Leader of the Opposition (2007–2012)
	Kathy Dunderdale	3 December 2010	24 January 2014	3 years, 52 days	Progressive Conservative	Premier (2010–2014)
	Alison Coffin	5 March 2019	19 October 2021	2 years, 228 days	New Democratic	None

== Nova Scotia ==
Portrait	Name	Date assumed office	Date departed office	Duration	Political party	Highest position
	Alexa McDonough	16 November 1980	19 November 1994	14 years, 3 days	New Democratic	None
	Helen MacDonald	17 July 2000	24 April 2001	281 days	New Democratic	None
	Karen Casey (interim)	2009	2010	?	Progressive Conservative	None
	Maureen MacDonald (interim)	23 November 2013	27 February 2016	2 years, 96 days	New Democratic	None
	Karla MacFarlane (interim)	24 January 2018	27 October 2018	276 days	Progressive Conservative	Leader of the Opposition (2018)
	Claudia Chender	25 June 2022	incumbent	4 years, 150 days	New Democratic	Leader of the Opposition (2024–)
	Becky Druhan	21 November 2026	incumbent	1 day	Liberal	

== Ontario ==
Portrait	Name	Date assumed office	Date departed office	Duration	Political party	Highest position
	Lyn McLeod	1992	1996	?	Liberal	Leader of the Opposition (1992–1996)
	Andrea Horwath	7 March 2009	28 June 2022	13 years, 113 days	New Democratic	Leader of the Opposition (2018–2022)
	Kathleen Wynne	26 January 2013	7 June 2018	5 years, 132 days	Liberal	Leader of the Opposition (2013–2018)
	Marit Stiles	4 February 2023	incumbent	3 years, 291 days	New Democratic	Leader of the Opposition (2023–)
	Bonnie Crombie	2 December 2023	14 January 2026	2 years, 43 days	Liberal	None

== Prince Edward Island ==
Portrait	Name	Date assumed office	Date departed office	Duration	Political party	Highest position
	Leone Bagnall (interim)	13 November 1987	11 June 1988	211 days	Progressive Conservative	Leader of the Opposition (1986–1993)
	Pat Mella	10 November 1990	4 May 1996	5 years, 176 days	Progressive Conservative	Leader of the Opposition (1993–1996)
	Catherine Callbeck	23 January 1993	5 October 1996	3 years, 256 days	Liberal	Premier (1993–1996)
	Sharon Labchuk (interim)	2005	2012	?	Green	None
	Olive Crane	4 September 2007	26 May 2010	2 years, 264 days	Progressive Conservative	Leader of the Opposition (2007–2010)
	Olive Crane (interim)	2 October 2010	31 January 2013	2 years, 121 days	Progressive Conservative	Leader of the Opposition (2010–2013)
	Sharon Cameron	19 November 2022	6 April 2023	138 days	Liberal	None
	Karla Bernard (interim)	21 July 2023	7 June 2025	1 year, 321 days	Green	None

== Quebec ==
Portrait	Name	Date assumed office	Date departed office	Duration	Political party	Highest position
	Nadia Brédimas-Assimopoulos (interim)	1985	1985	?	Parti Québécois	None
	Monique Gagnon-Tremblay (interim)	2 March 1998	30 April 1998	59 days	Liberal	Leader of the Opposition (1998)
	Louise Harel (interim)	6 June 2005	15 November 2005	162 days	Parti Québécois	Leader of the Opposition (2005)
	Françoise David	4 February 2006	19 January 2017	10 years, 350 days	Québec solidaire	None
	Pauline Marois	27 June 2007	7 June 2014	6 years, 345 days	Parti Québécois	Premier (2012–2014)
	Manon Massé	19 January 2017	26 November 2023	6 years, 311 days	Québec solidaire	None
	Dominique Anglade	11 May 2020	10 November 2022	2 years, 183 days	Liberal	Leader of the Opposition (2020–2022)
	Émilise Lessard-Therrien	26 November 2023	29 April 2024	155 days	Québec solidaire	None
	Christine Labrie (interim)	2 May 2024	16 November 2024	198 days	Québec solidaire	None
	Ruba Ghazal	16 November 2024	Incumbent	2 years, 6 days	Québec solidaire	None
	Christine Fréchette	15 April 2026	21 October 2026	192 days	Coalition Avenir Québec	Premier (2026)

== Saskatchewan ==
Portrait	Name	Date assumed office	Date departed office	Duration	Political party	Highest position
	Lynda Haverstock	2 April 1989	12 November 1995	6 years, 224 days	Liberal	Leader of the Opposition (1995)
	Nicole Sarauer (interim)	20 June 2017	3 March 2018	256 days	New Democratic	Leader of the Opposition (2017–2018)
	Carla Beck	26 June 2022	incumbent	4 years, 149 days	New Democratic	Leader of the Opposition (2022–)
	Nadine Wilson	30 November 2022	16 May 2024	1 year, 168 days	Saskatchewan United	

== Yukon ==
Portrait	Name	Date assumed office	Date departed office	Duration	Political party	Highest position
	Hilda Watson	1978	1979	?	Progressive Conservative	None
	Pat Duncan	1998	2005	?	Liberal	Premier (2000–2002)
	Elizabeth Hanson	26 September 2009	5 May 2019	9 years, 221 days	New Democratic	Leader of the Opposition (2011–2016)
	Kate White	4 May 2019	incumbent	7 years, 202 days	New Democratic	Leader of the Opposition (2025–)
	Debra-Leigh Reti (interim)	21 January 2026	Incumbent	305 days	Liberal	None

== See also ==
- Women in Canadian politics
- List of female first ministers in Canada
- List of vicereines in Canada
- List of elected or appointed female heads of state
- List of female prime ministers
- List of female leaders of British political parties
- List of female heads of government in Australia
- List of female governors in the United States
- List of visible minority political party leaders in Canada
