= List of female first ministers in Canada =

Map showing the number of female Premiers and Prime Ministers elected across the provinces and federally throughout their histories. Provinces marked with a white asterisk (*) denote incumbent premiers. None 1 2 3

A total of seventeen women have served as the first minister of a Canadian government. Of these, one was prime minister of the country, twelve were premiers of a province, and four were premiers of a territory. There are currently two first ministers in Canada who are women: Danielle Smith of Alberta and Susan Holt of New Brunswick.

Women have been eligible to become premier since they first gained the right to vote, beginning in 1916 in Manitoba and extending to all jurisdictions when Quebec allowed women to vote in 1940. Women soon began to be appointed to cabinet positions, starting with Mary Ellen Smith in British Columbia in 1921, but it was not until decades later that women began to serve as leaders of a major party. Hilda Watson became the first woman to lead her party to victory in a general election in 1978. However, Watson did not win her riding so her male successor became the first Government Leader of the Yukon. The first female premier was Rita Johnston in 1991 in British Columbia. Today, every Canadian jurisdiction has had at least one female premier except for Nova Scotia and Saskatchewan.

The most women first ministers at any one time was six, for 277 days from 11 February to 15 November 2013. These six included the premiers of Canada's four most populated provinces; during that time, approximately 88% of Canadians had a female premier. The longest-serving female premier is Christy Clark, who served as premier of British Columbia for over six years, from 14 March 2011 to 18 July 2017.

Four of the seventeen women first ministers won the title by defeating an incumbent first minister in a general election, while three were chosen by a consensus of their legislative assembly. The rest won the title through a party leadership race between elections, although several of those went on to win a general election as the incumbent premier. No woman premier in Canadian history has ever been elected to more than one mandate. Christy Clark came closest by winning the most seats in the 2017 election, which would have been her second mandate, but she was not successful in forming government as the BC Liberals were defeated in a confidence vote shortly after.

== First ministers ==
Portrait	Name	Jurisdiction	Date assumed office	Date departed office	Duration	Political party	Leadership history and electoral mandates
	Rita Johnston	British Columbia	2 April 1991	5 November 1991	217 days	Social Credit	Named as interim party leader—and therefore premier—in 1991 upon the resignation of Premier Bill Vander Zalm in the Fantasy Gardens scandal. Confirmed as party leader in the 1991 party leadership election. Her party lost power in the following general election.
	Nellie Cournoyea	Northwest Territories	14 November 1991	22 November 1995	4 years, 8 days	Nonpartisan (consensus government)	Chosen as the premier of the nonpartisan government after the 1991 general election for one term.
	Catherine Callbeck	Prince Edward Island	25 January 1993	9 October 1996	3 years, 258 days	Liberal	Chosen as party leader—and therefore premier—by the 1993 party leadership election upon the retirement of Premier Joe Ghiz. She then led her party to win the 1993 general election. She was the first provincial female party leader to lead a party to election or re-election. She resigned after dropping in the polls.
	Kim Campbell	Canada (Federal)	25 June 1993	4 November 1993	132 days	Progressive Conservative	Chosen as party leader—and therefore prime minister—by the 1993 party leadership election upon the retirement of Prime Minister Brian Mulroney. Her party lost power in the following general election.
	Pat Duncan	Yukon	5 June 2000	5 November 2002	2 years, 153 days	Liberal	Named party leader while her party was the third party opposition in 1998. Became leader of the opposition partway through the 29th Yukon Legislature. Led her party to victory and thereby became premier in the 2000 general election. She was the first woman to defeat a sitting premier. Her party lost power in the following general election.
	Eva Aariak	Nunavut	19 November 2008	19 November 2013	5 years, 0 days	Nonpartisan (consensus government)	Chosen as the premier of the nonpartisan government after the 2008 general election for one term.
	Kathy Dunderdale	Newfoundland and Labrador	3 December 2010	24 January 2014	3 years, 52 days	Progressive Conservative	Chosen as interim party leader—and therefore premier—in 2010 upon the retirement of Premier Danny Williams after serving as his deputy premier. Her party leadership was confirmed at the 2011 party leadership election. She then led her party to victory in the 2011 general election. She resigned after dropping in the polls.
	Christy Clark	British Columbia	14 March 2011	18 July 2017	6 years, 126 days	Liberal	Chosen as party leader—and therefore premier— by the 2011 party leadership election upon the retirement of Premier Gordon Campbell. Led her party to victory in the 2013 general election. She won a plurality of seats in the 2017 general election, but immediately lost a confidence vote and resigned. As of 2024, she is the female premier who held office the longest.
	Alison Redford	Alberta	7 October 2011	23 March 2014	2 years, 167 days	Progressive Conservative	Chosen as party leader—and therefore premier— by the 2011 party leadership election upon the retirement of Premier Ed Stelmach. Then led her party to victory in the 2012 general election. She resigned after dropping in the polls due to a number of damaging scandals.
	Pauline Marois	Quebec	19 September 2012	23 April 2014	1 year, 216 days	Parti Québécois	Chosen as party leader while her party was the third party opposition by the 2007 party leadership election. Led her party to become the official opposition in the 2008 general election and later led her party to victory—and thereby became premier—in the 2012 general election. She was the first female party leader to defeat a sitting premier in a province, and the first to achieve victory without having previously inherited premiership from a previous provincial party leader. Her party lost power in the following general election.
	Kathleen Wynne	Ontario	11 February 2013	29 June 2018	5 years, 138 days	Liberal	Chosen as party leader—and therefore premier—by the 2013 party leadership election upon the retirement of Premier Dalton McGuinty. Then led her party to victory in the 2014 general election. Lost re-election in the 2018 general election. Wynne was also the first lesbian woman to serve as a premier in Canada.
	Rachel Notley	Alberta	24 May 2015	30 April 2019	3 years, 341 days	New Democratic	Chosen as party leader while her party was the fourth party in opposition by the 2014 party leadership election. Led her party to victory in the 2015 general election. Defeated in the 2019 general election and became Leader of the Opposition.
	Caroline Cochrane	Northwest Territories	24 October 2019	8 December 2023	4 years, 45 days	Nonpartisan (consensus government)	Chosen as the premier of the nonpartisan government after the 2019 general election. Did not run for a second term.
	Heather Stefanson	Manitoba	2 November 2021	18 October 2023	1 year, 350 days	Progressive Conservative	Chosen as party leader—and premier—by the 2021 party leadership election upon the retirement of Premier Brian Pallister. Her party was defeated in the 2023 Manitoba general election.
	Danielle Smith	Alberta	11 October 2022	incumbent	4 years, 16 days	United Conservative	Chosen as party leader—and premier—by the 2022 party leadership election upon the resignation of Jason Kenney. She was re-elected in the 2023 Alberta general election.
	Susan Holt	New Brunswick	2 November 2024	incumbent	1 year, 354 days	Liberal	Chosen as party leader while her party was the official opposition by the 2022 party leadership election. Led her party to victory in the 2024 general election.
	Christine Fréchette	Quebec	15 April 2026	21 October 2026	189 days	Coalition Avenir Québec	Chosen as party leader—and premier—by the 2026 party leadership election upon the resignation of François Legault. Her party failed to win any seats in the 2026 election.

== See also ==
- Women in Canadian politics
- List of vicereines in Canada
- List of elected or appointed female heads of state
- List of visible minority political party leaders in Canada
- List of female prime ministers
- List of female governors in the United States
- List of female heads of government in Australia
- List of female political party leaders in Canada
