= Department of Agriculture, Aquaculture and Fisheries (New Brunswick) =

Agency overview
- Jurisdiction: Government of New Brunswick
- Headquarters: Hugh John Flemming Forestry Centre; 1350 Regent Street; Fredericton, New Brunswick, Canada
- Ministers responsible: Pat Finnigan, Minister of Agriculture, Aquaculture and Fisheries; Cathy LaRochelle, Deputy Minister; Stéphanie Guignard, Executive Secretary
- Website: www2.gnb.ca/content/gnb/en/departments/10.html

The Department of Agriculture, Aquaculture and Fisheries is an executive agency of the Government of New Brunswick. It is in charge of the development and support of food production and economic development through such sectors of the economy.

== History ==
The department was established on March 23, 2000 when Premier Bernard Lord restructured the New Brunswick Cabinet. It was a merger of the former departments of Agriculture and Rural Development and Fisheries & Aquaculture first under the name of the Department of Food Development and later under the name Department of Agriculture, Fisheries and Aquaculture. The creation of this department was very controversial and marked by protests by both farmers and fishers, though primarily farmers, who felt that the new department would not be specialized to adequately address their issues.

When Shawn Graham became Premier on October 3, 2006, he appointed a Minister of Agriculture and Aquaculture and a Minister of Fisheries. On March 2, 2007, a bill disbanding this department and creating a Department of Agriculture and Aquaculture and a Department of Fisheries received royal assent, the bill was retroactive to October 3, 2006. When Graham left office, Alward re-merged the departments under the new name Agriculture, Aquaculture and Fisheries.

== Ministers ==
#	Minister	Term	Administration
Minister of Agriculture, Fisheries & Aquaculture
1.	Paul Robichaud	March 23, 2000 – October 9, 2001	under Bernard Lord
2.	Rodney Weston	October 9, 2001 – June 27, 2003	under Bernard Lord
3.	David Alward	June 27, 2003 - October 3, 2006	under Bernard Lord
Minister of Agriculture & Aquaculture, and Minister of Fisheries
see DAA and DOF		October 3, 2006 - October 12, 2010	under Shawn Graham
Minister of Agriculture, Aquaculture & Fisheries
1.	Michael Olscamp	October 12, 2010 – October 7, 2014	under David Alward
2.	Rick Doucet	October 7, 2014 - November 8, 2018	under Brian Gallant
3.	Ross Wetmore	November 9, 2018 - September 29, 2020	under Blaine Higgs
4.	Margaret Johnson	September 29, 2020 – November 2, 2024	under Blaine Higgs
5.	Pat Finnigan	November 2, 2024 – Present	under Susan Holt
