= André Robichaud =

Canadian politician

MLA for Shippagan-les-Îles Gloucester (1970–74)
- In office 1970–1978
- Succeeded by: Jean Gauvin

Personal details
- Born: May 20, 1937 Detroit, Michigan, United States
- Died: May 23, 2017 (aged 80)
- Party: New Brunswick Liberal Association
- Spouse: Rose-Marie Mallet (m.1961)
- Children: four
- Occupation: Teacher

André Robichaud (May 20, 1937 – May 23, 2017) is a Canadian politician. He served in the Legislative Assembly of New Brunswick from 1970 to 1978, as a Liberal member for the constituency of Shippagan-les-Îles.
