= List of visible minority political party leaders in Canada =

This list comprises persons who belong to a visible minority group who have served as leaders of either federal, provincial, and territorial political parties in Canada. Note that the term "visible minority" refers to Canadians who identify as neither European nor Indigenous. (Note: Justin Trudeau, who served as Leader of the Liberal Party of Canada from 2013 to 2025 (and was the Prime Minister of Canada beginning in 2015), has very distant Indonesian ancestry. However, this is a genealogical footnote more than a real cultural or ethnic connection, and Trudeau has not identified himself as a member of a visible minority, nor have other observers.)

== List ==
Image	Leader	Jurisdiction	Ancestry	Took office	Left office	Duration	Party	Highest position
	Art Lee (b. 1947)	British Columbia	Chinese	1984	1987	3 years	Liberal	
	Joe Ghiz (1945–1996)	Prince Edward Island	Lebanese	24 October 1981	23 January 1993	11 years, 91 days	Liberal	Premier (1986–1993)
Leader Pannu	Raj Pannu (1934–2025)	Alberta	Indian	8 February 2000	13 July 2004	4 years, 156 days	New Democratic	
Premier Dosanjh	Ujjal Dosanjh (b. 1947)	British Columbia	Indian	24 February 2000	16 May 2001	1 year, 81 days	New Democratic	Premier (2000–2001)
Premier Ghiz	Robert Ghiz (b. 1974)	Prince Edward Island	Lebanese	5 April 2003	21 February 2015	11 years, 322 days	Liberal	Premier (2007–2015)
Leader Khadir	Amir Khadir (co-spokesperson, b. 1961)	Quebec	Iranian	4 February 2006	4 November 2012	6 years, 274 days	Québec solidaire	
Leader Michael	Lorraine Michael (b. 1943)	Newfoundland and Labrador	Lebanese	28 May 2006	7 March 2015	8 years, 283 days	New Democratic	
	Vivian Barbot (interim, b. 1941)	Canada (Federal)	Haitian	3 May 2011	11 December 2011	222 days	Bloc Québécois	
Leader Sherman	Raj Sherman (b. 1966)	Alberta	Indian	10 September 2011	26 January 2015	3 years, 138 days	Liberal	Leader of the Opposition (2011–2012)
	Andrés Fontecilla (co-spokesperson, b. 1967)	Quebec	Chilean	5 May 2013	21 May 2017	4 years, 16 days	Québec solidaire	
Leader Bokhari	Rana Bokhari (b. 1977)	Manitoba	Pakistani	26 October 2013	24 September 2016	2 years, 334 days	Liberal	
Leader Marcelino	Flor Marcelino (interim, b. 1951/1952)	Manitoba	Filipino	30 April 2016	16 September 2017	1 year, 139 days	New Democratic	Leader of the Opposition (2016–2017)
	Jagmeet Singh (b. 1979)	Canada (Federal)	Indian	1 October 2017	5 May 2025	7 years, 216 days	New Democratic	
	Dominique Anglade (b. 1974)	Quebec	Haitian	11 May 2020	10 November 2022	2 years, 183 days	Liberal	Leader of the Opposition (2020–2022)
	Annamie Paul (b. 1972)	Canada (Federal)	Caribbean	3 October 2020	14 November 2021	1 year, 42 days	Green	
	Amita Kuttner (interim, b. 1990)	Canada (Federal)	Hong Kong	24 November 2021	19 November 2022	360 days	Green	
	Zach Churchill	Nova Scotia	Lebanese	9 July 2022	27 October 2024	2 years, 110 days	Liberal	Leader of the Opposition (2022–2024)
Premier Pillai	Ranj Pillai (b. 1974)	Yukon	Indian	14 January 2023	27 June 2025	2 years, 164 days	Liberal	Premier (2023–2025)
	Naheed Nenshi (b. 1972)	Alberta	Indian	22 June 2024	Incumbent	2 years, 153 days	New Democratic	Leader of the Opposition (2025–present)
	Ruba Ghazal (co-spokesperson, b. 1977)	Quebec	Palestinian	16 November 2024	Incumbent	2 years, 6 days	Québec solidaire	
	Jonathan Pedneault (co-leader, b. 1990)	Canada (Federal)	Cuban	4 February 2025	30 April 2025	85 days	Green	
	Obby Khan (b. 1980)	Manitoba	Pakistani	26 April 2025	28 September 2026	1 year, 155 days	Progressive Conservative	Leader of the Opposition (2025–2026)
	Pablo Rodriguez (b. 1967)	Quebec	Argentine	14 June 2025	17 December 2025	186 days	Liberal	
	Willard Reaves (b. 1959)	Manitoba	African American	29 September 2025	Incumbent	1 year, 54 days	Liberal	
	Navdeep Bains (b. 1977)	Ontario	Indian	21 November 2026	Incumbent	1 day	Liberal	

== See also ==
- List of current Canadian first ministers
- List of female first ministers in Canada
- List of visible minority Canadian cabinet ministers
- List of visible minority politicians in Canada
- List of minority governors and lieutenant governors in the United States
- List of Indigenous Canadian politicians
- List of Jewish Canadian politicians
- List of female political party leaders in Canada
