= Eric Mallet =

Canadian politician

Member of the New Brunswick Legislative Assembly
- Incumbent
- Assumed office September 14, 2020
- Preceded by: Robert Gauvin
- Constituency: Shippagan-Lamèque-Miscou (2020-2024)
- Constituency: Shippagan-Les-Îles (2024-present)

Personal details
- Party: Liberal

Eric Mallet is a Canadian politician, who was elected to the Legislative Assembly of New Brunswick in the 2020 New Brunswick general election. He represents the electoral district of Shippagan-Lamèque-Miscou as a member of the New Brunswick Liberal Association. On October 5, 2020, he was named Public Safety Critic and Service New Brunswick Critic for the official opposition. He is also a member of the Standing Committee on Climate Change and Environmental Stewardship and the Standing Committee on Private Bills.

== Electoral record ==
2024 New Brunswick general election: Shippagan-Les-Îles
Party	Candidate	Votes	%	±%
Liberal	Éric Mallet	5,021	75.4%	-8.38
Green	Wilfred Roussel	1,111	16.7%	+9.23
Progressive Conservative	François Robichaud	530	8.0%	-0.75
Total valid votes		6,662		
Total rejected ballots				
Turnout				
Eligible voters				
Liberal hold		Swing		
Source: Elections New Brunswick
