= William Elder (Canadian politician) =

Canadian politician

William Elder (July 22, 1822 – July 23, 1883) was a Presbyterian clergyman, journalist and political figure in New Brunswick, Canada. He represented St. John County in the Legislative Assembly of New Brunswick from 1875 to 1883.

He was born in Malin, County Donegal, Ireland and studied theology at Belfast College, the University of Glasgow, the University of Edinburgh and New College, Edinburgh. Elder came to New Brunswick as a missionary in 1853. In 1856, he established the Colonial Presbyterian and Protestant Journal. In 1865, he founded the Morning Journal at Saint John. In 1869, that newspaper merged with the Morning Telegraph to form the St. John Daily Telegraph and Morning Journal (later the Telegraph-Journal), with John Livingston as owner and Elder as editor. At the same time, his Colonial Presbyterian merged with the Presbyterian Advocate. In 1871, he became sole owner of both newspapers. "He ranks high amongst the greater newspaper men of Canada". Elder was also a director for the Saint John Grammar School Board and the Saint John Board of Trade.

In 1872, Elder ran unsuccessfully for a seat in the House of Commons of Canada. He was elected to the Legislative Assembly of New Brunswick in an 1875 by-election held after the death of Joseph Coram. In 1883, he was named provincial secretary, president and chairman of the Board of Agriculture. He died in office in Saint John several months later.

Preceded by George J. Colter; 1882-1883	New Brunswick; Minister of Agriculture; 1883–1883	Succeeded by James Mitchell; 1890-1897

== Bibliography ==
- Barkley, Murray (1982). "Elder, William (1822-83)". In Halpenny, Francess G (ed.). Dictionary of Canadian Biography. Vol. XI (1881–1890) (online ed.). University of Toronto Press.
