= Cyril Sherwood =

Canadian politician

The Honourable Cyril Sherwood

Senator for New Brunswick
- In office October 3, 1979 – July 1, 1990

Personal details
- Born: July 1, 1915 Midland, New Brunswick
- Died: December 10, 1996 (aged 81)
- Profession: Farmer

Cyril Beverly "Cy" Sherwood (July 1, 1915 – December 10, 1996) was a farmer and political figure in New Brunswick, Canada. He represented King's County in the Legislative Assembly of New Brunswick as a Progressive Conservative member from 1952 to 1967. He was named to the Senate of Canada for Royal division in 1979 and served until 1990.

He was born in Midland, New Brunswick, the son of Richard M. Sherwood and Edna Gillies. He was educated at the University of New Brunswick. He raised dairy cattle and was also a fox rancher. In 1939, he married Madelene Lunn. Sherwood was Minister of Agriculture in the province's Executive Council from 1952 to 1960. He helped establish the New Brunswick Cream Producers' Marketing Board and the New Brunswick Milk Producers' Association and introduced legislation that led to the creation of the New Brunswick Milk Marketing Board.

New Brunswick provincial government of Hugh John Flemming
Cabinet post (1)
Predecessor	Office	Successor
Austin Claude Taylor	'Minister of Agriculture and Rural Development'; 1952-1960	J. Adrien Levesque
