= Austin Claude Taylor =

Canadian politician (1893–1965)

The Hon. Austin Claude Taylor
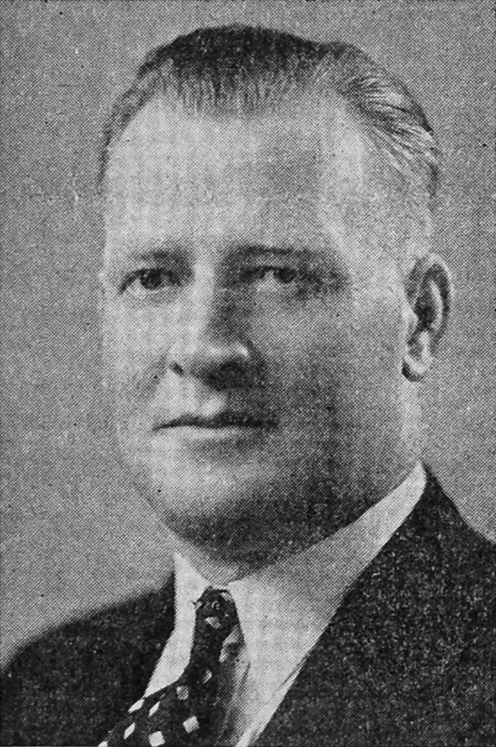
- Taylor, pictured in a 1944 newspaper

Senator for Westmorland, New Brunswick
- In office 1957–1965
- Appointed by: Louis St. Laurent

Member of the Legislative Assembly of New Brunswick for Westmorland
- In office 1935–1957

New Brunswick Leader of the Opposition
- In office 1952–1957
- Preceded by: Hugh John Flemming
- Succeeded by: Joseph E. Connolly

Personal details
- Born: June 20, 1893 Salisbury, New Brunswick
- Died: January 17, 1965 (aged 71)
- Party: Liberal

Austin Claude Taylor (June 20, 1893 – January 17, 1965) was a farmer, merchant and political figure in New Brunswick. Born in Salisbury, New Brunswick, he represented Westmorland County in the Legislative Assembly of New Brunswick from 1935 to 1957.

Appointed to the Executive Council as the Minister of Agriculture, he served under two Premiers from 1935 to 1952.

Austin Taylor was the leader of the Liberal Party of New Brunswick from 1954 to 1956.

On January 3, 1957, Taylor was appointed to the Senate of Canada by Canadian Prime Minister Louis St. Laurent as the representative for Westmorland, New Brunswick. He served in the Senate until his death in 1965.

New Brunswick provincial government of John B. McNair
Cabinet post (1)
Predecessor	Office	Successor
Himself	'Minister of Agriculture'; 1940-1952	Cyril B. Sherwood
New Brunswick provincial government of Allison Dysart
Cabinet post (1)
Predecessor	Office	Successor
Lewis Smith	'Minister of Agriculture'; 1935-1940	Himself
