= Department of Healthy and Inclusive Communities =

Agency overview
- Jurisdiction: New Brunswick
- Parent department: Government of New Brunswick

The Department of Healthy and Inclusive Communities is a part of the provincial government of New Brunswick, Canada. It is charged with the promotion of "wellness" through healthy living and physical activity and with administration of government programs for sport and recreation. It also works in partnership with the non-profit sector and stakeholders to better address the needs of seniors, young people, people living in poverty and persons with disabilities.

== History ==
The department was established as the Department of Wellness, Culture and Sport on February 14, 2006 when Premier Bernard Lord restructured government. It combined the Wellness Branch of the former Department of Health and Wellness with the standalone Culture and Sport Secretariat.

The department was briefly abolished on March 15, 2012 when Premier David Alward restructured government. It was merged with the Department of Tourism and Parks to form the new Department of Culture, Tourism and Healthy-Living. However, it was re-established in October 2012 as the Department of Healthy and Inclusive Communities, ceding its community arts development and heritage functions to a new Department of Tourism, Heritage and Culture while assuming liaison with the non-profit sector from the Department of Social Development.

== Ministers ==
#	Minister	Term	Administration
Minister of Wellness, Culture and Sport
1.	Percy Mockler*	February 14, 2006 - October 3, 2006	under Bernard Lord
2.	Shawn Graham	October 3, 2006 - October 31, 2007	as Premier
3.	Hédard Albert	October 31, 2007 - October 12, 2010	under Shawn Graham
4.	Trevor Holder	October 12, 2010 - March 15, 2012	under David Alward
Minister of Culture, Tourism and Healthy-Living
	Trevor Holder	March 15, 2012 - October 9, 2012	under David Alward
Minister of Healthy and Inclusive Communities
5.	Dorothy Shephard	October 9, 2012 - October 7, 2014	under David Alward
6.	Cathy Rogers	October 7, 2014 - June 6, 2016	Brian Gallant

* Mockler had previously held responsibility for the Culture & Sport Secretariat which made up the majority of this new department.
