= Department of Agriculture and Aquaculture (New Brunswick) =

Agriculture ministry of New Brunswick (province of Canada)

The Department of Agriculture and Aquaculture in the Canadian Province of New Brunswick was formed when Shawn Graham became Premier on October 3, 2006. He split the departments, introducing a Bill On March 2, 2007, disbanding the Department of Agriculture, Fisheries and Aquaculture and creating the Department of Agriculture and Aquaculture and a separate Department of Fisheries. Once it received Royal Assent, the Bill was retroactive to October 3, 2006.

The first Department of Agriculture was created in 1882 by the government of then Premier Daniel Hanington.

In September 2010, the department was merged with the Department of Fisheries. In October 2010, the new departmental structure is reflected in the transitional provisions of SNB 2010, c. 31, An Act to Amend the Executive Council Act.

== Ministers ==
#	Minister	Term	Administration of:
1.	Ronald Ouellette	October 3, 2006 - to 2010	Shawn Graham
