= List of female leaders of British political parties =

This is a list of female party leaders of British political parties.

== Parliamentary parties ==
=== Alliance Party of Northern Ireland ===
Leader (Birth–death)	Portrait	Constituency	Took office	Left office	Prime Minister
Naomi Long (b. 1971)		Belfast East (Note: Multi-member constituency) (NI Assembly)	26 October 2016	Incumbent	May
Naomi Long (b. 1971)		Belfast East (NI Assembly)	26 October 2016	Incumbent	Johnson
Naomi Long (b. 1971)		Belfast East (NI Assembly)	26 October 2016	Incumbent	Truss
Naomi Long (b. 1971)		Belfast East (NI Assembly)	26 October 2016	Incumbent	Sunak
Naomi Long (b. 1971)		Belfast East (NI Assembly)	26 October 2016	Incumbent	Starmer
Naomi Long (b. 1971)		Belfast East (NI Assembly)	26 October 2016	Incumbent	Burnham

=== Conservative Party ===
Leader (Birth–death)	Portrait	Constituency	Took office	Left office	Prime Minister
Margaret Thatcher (1925–2013)		Finchley	11 February 1975	28 November 1990	Wilson
Margaret Thatcher (1925–2013)		Finchley	11 February 1975	28 November 1990	Callaghan
Margaret Thatcher (1925–2013)		Finchley	11 February 1975	28 November 1990	Herself
Theresa May (b. 1956)		Maidenhead	11 July 2016	23 July 2019	Herself
Liz Truss (b. 1975)		South West Norfolk	6 September 2022	24 October 2022	Herself
Kemi Badenoch (b. 1980)		North West Essex	2 November 2024	Incumbent	Starmer
Kemi Badenoch (b. 1980)		North West Essex	2 November 2024	Incumbent	Burnham

=== Democratic Unionist Party ===
Leader (Birth–death)	Portrait	Constituency	Took office	Left office	Prime Minister (Note: Foster served as First Minister of Northern Ireland from January 2016 to January 2017, and from January 2020 to June 2021)
Arlene Foster (b. 1970)		Fermanagh and South Tyrone (Note: Multi-member constituency) (NI Assembly)	17 December 2015	28 May 2021	Cameron
Arlene Foster (b. 1970)		Fermanagh and South Tyrone (NI Assembly)	17 December 2015	28 May 2021	May
Arlene Foster (b. 1970)		Fermanagh and South Tyrone (NI Assembly)	17 December 2015	28 May 2021	Johnson

=== Green Party of England and Wales ===
Leader (Birth–death)	Portrait	Title	Took office	Left office	Prime Minister
Jean Lambert (b. 1950)		Female Principal Speaker	1992	1993	Major
Jan Clark		Female Principal Speaker	1993	1995	Major
Peg Alexander		Female Principal Speaker	1995	1997	Major
Jean Lambert (b. 1950)		Female Principal Speaker	1998	1999	Blair
Margaret Wright (1940–2012)		Female Principal Speaker	1999	2003	Blair
Caroline Lucas (b. 1960)		Female Principal Speaker	2003	24 November 2006	Blair
Siân Berry (b. 1974)		Female Principal Speaker	24 November 2006	30 November 2007	Blair
Siân Berry (b. 1974)		Female Principal Speaker	24 November 2006	30 November 2007	Blair; Brown
Caroline Lucas (b. 1960)		Female Principal Speaker	30 November 2007	5 September 2008	Blair; Brown
Caroline Lucas (b. 1960)		Leader of the Green Party	5 September 2008	3 September 2012	Blair; Brown
Caroline Lucas (b. 1960)		Leader of the Green Party	5 September 2008	3 September 2012	Cameron
Natalie Bennett (b. 1966)		Leader of the Green Party	3 September 2012	2 September 2016	Cameron
Natalie Bennett (b. 1966)		Leader of the Green Party	3 September 2012	2 September 2016	Cameron; May
Caroline Lucas (b. 1960)		Co-leader of the Green Party	2 September 2016	4 September 2018	Cameron; May
Siân Berry (b. 1974)		Co-leader of the Green Party	4 September 2018	1 October 2021	Cameron; May
Siân Berry (b. 1974)		Co-leader of the Green Party	4 September 2018	1 October 2021	May; Johnson
Carla Denyer (b. 1985)		Co-leader of the Green Party	1 October 2021	2 September 2025	May; Johnson
Carla Denyer (b. 1985)		Co-leader of the Green Party	1 October 2021	2 September 2025	Johnson; Truss; Sunak
Carla Denyer (b. 1985)		Co-leader of the Green Party	1 October 2021	2 September 2025	Starmer

=== Labour Party ===
Leader (Birth–death)	Portrait	Constituency	Took office	Left office	Prime Minister
Margaret Beckett (acting) (b. 1943)		Derby South	12 May 1994	21 July 1994	Major
Harriet Harman (acting) (b. 1950)		Camberwell and Peckham	11 May 2010	25 September 2010	Cameron
Harriet Harman (acting) (b. 1950)		Camberwell and Peckham	8 May 2015	12 September 2015	Cameron

=== Liberal Democrats ===
Leader (Birth–death)	Portrait	Constituency	Took office	Left office	Prime Minister
The Baroness Brinton (acting) (de facto) (b. 1955)		N/A	8 May 2015	16 July 2015	Cameron
Jo Swinson (b. 1980)		East Dunbartonshire	22 July 2019	13 December 2019	May
Jo Swinson (b. 1980)		East Dunbartonshire	22 July 2019	13 December 2019	Johnson
The Baroness Brinton (acting) (b. 1955)		N/A	13 December 2019	31 December 2019	Johnson

=== Plaid Cymru ===
Leader (Birth–death)	Portrait	Constituency	Took office	Left office	Prime Minister
Leanne Wood (b. 1971)		Rhondda (Senedd)	16 March 2012	28 September 2018	Cameron
Leanne Wood (b. 1971)		Rhondda (Senedd)	16 March 2012	28 September 2018	May

=== Scottish National Party ===
Leader (Birth–death)	Portrait	Constituency	Took office	Left office	Prime Minister (Note: Nicola Sturgeon was First Minister of Scotland from 20 November 2014 to 29 March 2023)
Nicola Sturgeon (b. 1970)		Glasgow Southside (Scottish Parliament)	14 November 2014	27 March 2023	Cameron
Nicola Sturgeon (b. 1970)		Glasgow Southside (Scottish Parliament)	14 November 2014	27 March 2023	May
Nicola Sturgeon (b. 1970)		Glasgow Southside (Scottish Parliament)	14 November 2014	27 March 2023	Johnson
Nicola Sturgeon (b. 1970)		Glasgow Southside (Scottish Parliament)	14 November 2014	27 March 2023	Truss
Nicola Sturgeon (b. 1970)		Glasgow Southside (Scottish Parliament)	14 November 2014	27 March 2023	Sunak

=== Sinn Féin ===
Leader (Birth–death)	Portrait	Constituency	Took office	Left office	Prime Minister
Margaret Buckley (1879–1962)		N/A	1937	1950	Chamberlain
Margaret Buckley (1879–1962)		N/A	1937	1950	Churchill
Margaret Buckley (1879–1962)		N/A	1937	1950	Attlee
Mary Lou McDonald (b. 1969)		Dublin Central (Note: Multi-member constituency) (Dáil Éireann)	10 February 2018	Incumbent	May
Mary Lou McDonald (b. 1969)		Dublin Central (Dáil Éireann)	10 February 2018	Incumbent	Johnson
Mary Lou McDonald (b. 1969)		Dublin Central (Dáil Éireann)	10 February 2018	Incumbent	Truss
Mary Lou McDonald (b. 1969)		Dublin Central (Dáil Éireann)	10 February 2018	Incumbent	Sunak
Mary Lou McDonald (b. 1969)		Dublin Central (Dáil Éireann)	10 February 2018	Incumbent	Starmer
Mary Lou McDonald (b. 1969)		Dublin Central (Dáil Éireann)	10 February 2018	Incumbent	Burnham

=== Social Democratic and Labour Party ===
Leader (Birth–death)	Portrait	Constituency	Took office	Left office	Prime Minister
Margaret Ritchie (b. 1958)		South Down (Note: Also MLA of South Down until 31 March 2012)	7 February 2010	5 November 2011	Brown
Margaret Ritchie (b. 1958)		South Down	7 February 2010	5 November 2011	Cameron
Claire Hanna (b. 1980)		Belfast South and Mid Down	5 October 2024	Incumbent	Starmer
Claire Hanna (b. 1980)		Belfast South and Mid Down	5 October 2024	Incumbent	Burnham

== Parties with representation in devolved parliaments ==
=== Green Party in Northern Ireland ===
Leader (Birth–death)	Portrait	Constituency	Took office	Left office	Current representation
Lindsay Whitcroft		None	2004	2005	0 / 90 (Northern Ireland Assembly)
Kelly Andrews		None	2005	2009	0 / 90 (Northern Ireland Assembly)
Karly Greene		None	2009	2011	0 / 90 (Northern Ireland Assembly)
Clare Bailey (b. 1970)		Belfast South (Note: Multi-member constituency) (Northern Ireland Assembly)	21 November 2018	15 August 2022	0 / 90 (Northern Ireland Assembly)

=== Liberal Vannin Party ===
Leader	Constituency	Took office	Left office	Current representation
Kate Costain	Douglas South (Note: Until 14 July 2020) (House of Keys)	24 February 2014	Incumbent	1 / 24 (House of Keys)

=== Scottish Greens ===
Leader (Birth–death)	Portrait	Constituency / Ward	Took office	Left office	Current representation
Marian Coyne		None	1999	1999	15 / 129 (Scottish Parliament)
Eleanor Scott (b. 1951)		Highlands and Islands (Note: Multi-member constituency) (Scottish Parliament)	2002	2004	15 / 129 (Scottish Parliament)
Shiona Baird (b. 1946)		North East Scotland (Scottish Parliament)	2004	2007	15 / 129 (Scottish Parliament)
Alison Johnstone (b. 1965)		Lothian (Scottish Parliament)	2007	2008	15 / 129 (Scottish Parliament)
Eleanor Scott (b. 1951)		N/A	2008	2011	15 / 129 (Scottish Parliament)
Martha Wardrop (b. 1951)		Hillhead (council ward)	2011	November 2013	15 / 129 (Scottish Parliament)
Maggie Chapman (b. 1979)		Leith Walk (Note: Until June 2015) (council ward)	November 2013	1 August 2019	15 / 129 (Scottish Parliament)
Lorna Slater (b. 1974/5)		Lothian (Note: From May 2021) (Scottish Parliament)	1 August 2019	29 August 2025	15 / 129 (Scottish Parliament)
Gillian Mackay (b. 1991)		Central Scotland (Scottish Parliament)	29 August 2025	Incumbent	15 / 129 (Scottish Parliament)

=== Regional branches of parliamentary parties ===
==== London Conservatives ====
Leader (Birth–death)	Portrait	Constituency	Took office	Left office	Current representation
Angie Bray (b. 1953)		West Central (London Assembly)	2006	2007	9 / 25 (London Assembly)
Susan Hall		Additional member (London Assembly)	17 December 2019	Incumbent	9 / 25 (London Assembly)

==== Scottish Conservatives ====
Leader (Birth–death)	Portrait	Constituency	Took office	Left office	Current representation
Annabel Goldie (b. 1950)		West Scotland (Note: Multi-member constituency) (Scottish Parliament)	8 November 2005 (Note: Acting since 31 October 2005)	4 November 2011	12 / 129 (Scottish Parliament)
Ruth Davidson (b. 1978)		Glasgow (Scottish Parliament) (Note: Until 2016); Edinburgh Central (Scottish Parliament) (Note: From 2016)	4 November 2011	29 August 2019	12 / 129 (Scottish Parliament)

==== Scottish Labour ====
Leader (Birth–death)	Portrait	Constituency	Took office	Left office	Current representation
Cathy Jamieson (acting) (b. 1956)		Carrick, Cumnock and Doon Valley (Scottish Parliament)	8 November 2001	22 November 2001	17 / 129 (Scottish Parliament)
Cathy Jamieson (acting) (b. 1956)		Carrick, Cumnock and Doon Valley (Scottish Parliament)	15 August 2007	14 September 2007	17 / 129 (Scottish Parliament)
Wendy Alexander (b. 1963)		Paisley North (Scottish Parliament)	14 September 2007	28 June 2008	17 / 129 (Scottish Parliament)
Cathy Jamieson (acting) (b. 1956)		Carrick, Cumnock and Doon Valley (Scottish Parliament)	28 June 2008	3 September 2008	17 / 129 (Scottish Parliament)
Johann Lamont (b. 1957)		Glasgow Pollok (Scottish Parliament)	17 December 2011	24 October 2014	17 / 129 (Scottish Parliament)
Kezia Dugdale (b. 1981)		Lothian (Note: Multi-member constituency) (Scottish Parliament)	15 August 2015	29 August 2017	17 / 129 (Scottish Parliament)
Jackie Baillie (acting) (b. 1964)		Dumbarton (Scottish Parliament)	15 November 2017	18 November 2017	17 / 129 (Scottish Parliament)
Jackie Baillie (acting) (b. 1964)		Dumbarton (Scottish Parliament)	14 January 2021	27 February 2021	17 / 129 (Scottish Parliament)
Jackie Baillie (acting) (b. 1964)		Dumbarton (Scottish Parliament)	23 July 2026	19 September 2026	

==== Welsh Labour ====
Leader (Birth–death)	Portrait	Constituency	Took office	Left office	Current representation
Eluned Morgan (b. 1967)		Mid and West Wales (Senedd)	24 July 2024	8 May 2026	9 / 96 (Senedd)

==== Welsh Liberal Democrats ====
Leader (Birth–death)	Portrait	Constituency	Took office	Left office	Current representation
Kirsty Williams (b. 1971)		Brecon and Radnorshire (Senedd)	8 December 2008	6 May 2016	1 / 60 (Senedd)
Kirsty Williams (b. 1971)		Brecon and Radnorshire (Senedd)	16 June 2017 (acting)	3 November 2017	1 / 60 (Senedd)
Jane Dodds (b. 1963)		Brecon and Radnorshire (House of Commons, August–December 2019); Mid and West Wales (Note: Multi-member constituency) (Note: From 2021 to 2026) (Senedd); Brycheiniog Tawe Nedd (Note: Since 2026) (Senedd)	3 November 2017	Incumbent	1 / 60 (Senedd)

== Parties with representation in local government ==
=== Alliance for Local Living ===
Leader	Ward	Took office	Left office	Current representation
Felicity Rice	Oakdale (BCP Council)	1 April 2019	Incumbent	4 councillors

=== Animal Welfare Party ===
Leader (Birth–death)	Portrait	Ward	Took office	Left office	Current representation
Vanessa Hudson (b. 1972)		N/A	October 2010	Incumbent	None

=== Reform UK ===
Leader (Birth–death)	Ward	Took office	Left office	Current representation
Catherine Blaiklock (b. 1963)	N/A	20 January 2019	20 March 2019	1 MP and 9 councillors

=== Guildford Greenbelt Group ===
Leader	Ward	Took office	Left office	Current representation
Susan Parker	Send (Guildford borough council)	2013	Incumbent	3 councillors

=== Horwich and Blackrod First ===
Leader	Ward	Took office	Left office	Current representation
Marie Brady	Horwich North East (Bolton Council)	8 February 2019	Incumbent	2 councillors

=== Independence for Scotland Party ===
Leader	Took office	Left office	Current representation
Colette Walker	7 May 2020	Incumbent	1 councillor

=== Lincolnshire Independents ===
Leader (Birth–death)	Ward	Took office	Left office	Current representation
Marianne Overton (b. 1959)	Cliff Villages (North Kesteven district council)	2008	Incumbent	1 councillor

=== Mebyon Kernow ===
Leader (Birth–death)	Took office	Left office	Current representation
Helena Sanders (1911–1997)	January 1951	1957	5 councillors
Loveday Carlyon	1986	1989	5 councillors
Loveday Jenkin	1990	1997	5 councillors

=== Orkney Manifesto Group ===
Leader	Ward	Took office	Left office	Current representation
Rachael King	West Mainland (Orkney Islands Council)	March 2013	Incumbent	None

=== Progressive Unionist Party ===
Leader (Birth–death)	Portrait	Ward	Took office	Left office	Current representation
Dawn Purvis (b. 1967)		Belfast East (Note: Multi-member constituency, from 7 March 2007) (NI Assembly)	23 January 2007	2 June 2010	1 councillor

=== The Rubbish Party ===
Leader	Ward	Took office	Left office	Current representation
Sally Cogley	Irvine Valley (East Ayrshire council)	March 2017	Incumbent	1 councillor

=== UK Independence Party (UKIP) ===
Leader (Birth–death)	Portrait	Constituency	Took office	Left office	Current representation
Diane James (b. 1959)		South East England (European Parliament)	16 September 2016	4 October 2016	None
Pat Mountain (acting)		N/A	30 October 2019	25 April 2020	None

== Parties with no elected UK representation ==
=== Advance Together ===
Leader	Took office	Left office	Elections contested as leader
Annabel Mullin	September 2018	Incumbent	2019 general election

=== Communist Party of Great Britain (Marxist–Leninist) ===
Leader	Took office	Left office	Elections contested as leader
Ella Rule	24 October 2018	Incumbent	None

=== Freedom Alliance ===
Leader	Took office	Left office	Elections contested as leader
Carol Dobson (acting)	27 January 2021	Incumbent	2021 Scottish Parliament election 2021 United Kingdom local elections

=== Left Unity ===
Leader	Took office	Left office	Elections contested as leader
Sharon McCourt	25 March 2017	Incumbent	None

=== National Health Action Party ===
Leader	Took office	Left office	Elections contested as leader
Veronika Wagner	c. August 2019	Incumbent	2021 local elections

=== Renew Party ===
Leader	Portrait	Seat	Took office	Left office	Elections contested as leader
Annabel Mullin		N/A	20 September 2018	7 June 2019	2019 European Parliament election
Julie Girling		South West England (Note: Multi-member constituency, until 1 July 2019) (European Parliament)	7 June 2019	7 July 2020	2019 general election

=== Scottish Socialist Party ===
Leader (Birth–death)	Portrait	Took office	Left office	Elections contested as leader
Frances Curran (b. 1961)		c.2007	2012	2009 European Parliament election 2010 general election 2011 Scottish Parliament election
Sandra Webster		2012	2016	2015 general election 2016 Scottish Parliament election
Katie Bonnar		2016	2018	None
Róisín McLaren (b. 1994)		2018	Incumbent	None

=== Socialist Party (England and Wales) ===
Leader (Birth–death)	Took office	Left office	Elections contested as leader
Hannah Sell (b. 1971)	11 March 2020	Incumbent	None

=== UK Independence Party ===
Leader (Birth–death)	Portrait	Constituency	Took office	Left office
Diane James (b. 1959)		South East England (European Parliament)	16 September 2016	4 October 2016
Pat Mountain (acting)		N/A	30 October 2019	25 April 2020
Lois Perry		N/A	13 May 2024	15 June 2024

=== Workers' Party (Ireland) ===
Leader (Birth–death)	Took office	Left office	Elections contested as leader
Marian Donnelly (b. 1938)	March 1992	1994	1993 Northern Ireland local elections

=== Regional branches of parties without elected representation ===
==== Reform UK Scotland ====
Leader	Portrait	Constituency	Took office	Left office	Elections contested as leader
Michelle Ballantyne		South Scotland (Note: Multi-member constituency, until 6 May 2021) (Scottish Parliament)	11 January 2021	16 February 2022	2021 Scottish Parliament election

== Defunct parties ==
=== Change UK / The Independent Group for Change ===
Leader (Birth–death)	Portrait	Constituency	Took office	Left office	Elections contested as leader
Heidi Allen (Acting) (b. 1975)		South Cambridgeshire	29 March 2019	4 June 2019	2019 European Parliament election
Anna Soubry (b. 1956)		Broxtowe	4 June 2019	19 December 2019	2019 general election

=== Communist Party of Great Britain ===
Leader (Birth–death)	Took office	Left office	Elections contested as leader
Nina Temple (b. 1956)	13 January 1990	23 November 1991	None

=== For Britain Movement ===
Leader (Birth–death)	Portrait	Ward	Took office	Left office	Elections contested as leader
Anne Marie Waters (b. 1977)		N/A	October 2017	13 July 2022	2019 local elections 2021 local elections 2022 local elections

=== Highlands and Islands Alliance ===
Leader	Took office	Left office	Elections contested as leader
Lorraine Mann	Autumn 1998	24 August 2004	1999 Scottish Parliament election

=== Independent Labour Party ===
Leader	Took office	Left office	Elections contested as leader
Annie Maxton	1953	1958	1955 United Kingdom general election

=== Jersey Democratic Alliance ===
Leader	Took office	Left office	Elections contested as leader
Christine Papworth	April 2005	October 2011	2005 Jersey general election 2008 Jersey general election

=== Nationalist Alliance ===
Leader	Took office	Left office	Elections contested as leader
Catherine Parker-Brown	2005	2008	None

=== No Candidate Deserves My Vote! ===
Leader	Took office	Left office	Elections contested as leader
Amanda Ringwood	November 2000	2012	2001 local elections 2002 local elections 2010 general election

=== Northern Ireland Women's Coalition ===
Leader (Birth–death)	Portrait	Constituency	Took office	Left office	Elections contested as leader
Monica McWilliams (b. 1954)		Belfast South (Note: Multi-member constituency) (Northern Ireland Assembly) (Note: Until 26 November 2003)	April 1996	11 May 2006	1996 NI Forum election 1997 general election 1998 NI Assembly election 2001 NI local elections 2001 general election 2003 NI Assembly election 2005 NI local elections
Pearl Sagar (b. 1958)		Belfast East (Northern Ireland Forum) (Note: Until 25 June 1998)	April 1996	11 May 2006	1996 NI Forum election 1997 general election 1998 NI Assembly election 2001 NI local elections 2001 general election 2003 NI Assembly election 2005 NI local elections

=== Respect Party ===
Leader (Birth–death)	Portrait	Took office	Left office	Elections contested as leader
Linda Smith		2004	2005	N/A
Salma Yaqoob (b. 1971)		2005	September 2012	2005 general election 2006 local elections 2010 general election 2010 local elections

=== Unionist Party of Northern Ireland ===
Leader (Birth–death)	Took office	Left office	Elections contested as leader
Anne Dickson (b. 1928)	1976	Autumn 1981	1977 United Kingdom local elections 1979 United Kingdom general election 1981 Northern Ireland local elections

=== Veritas ===
Leader	Took office	Left office	Elections contested as leader
Therese Muchewicz	15 June 2008 (Note: Acting until October 2008)	19 September 2015	None

=== We Demand a Referendum Now ===
Leader (Birth–death)	Portrait	Constituency	Took office	Left office	Elections contested as leader
Nikki Sinclaire (b. 1968)		West Midlands (Note: Multi-member constituency) (European Parliament)	June 2012	30 June 2014	2014 European Parliament election

=== Women's Party ===
Leader (Birth–death)	Portrait	Took office	Left office	Elections contested as leader
Christabel Pankhurst (1880–1958)		November 1917	June 1919	1918 general election
Emmeline Pankhurst (1858–1928)		November 1917	June 1919	1918 general election

=== Women's Equality Party ===
Leader (Birth–death)	Portrait	Ward	Took office	Left office	Elections contested as leader
Sophie Walker (b. 1971)		N/A	22 July 2015	22 January 2019	2017 general election
Mandu Reid (b. 1981)		N/A	April 2019 (Acting until January 2020)	17 November 2024	2021 London mayoral election

=== Active groups which were deregistered by the Electoral Commission ===
==== Britain First ====
Leader	Took office	Left office	Elections contested as leader
Jayda Fransen (acting)	December 2016	June 2017	2016 London mayoral election
