= Jean-Camille DeGrâce =

Canadian politician (1941–2023)

Jean-Camille DeGrâce (July 3, 1941 – June 2, 2023) was a Canadian educator and political figure in New Brunswick. He represented Lamèque-Shippagan-Miscou in the Legislative Assembly of New Brunswick from 1995 to 1999 as a Liberal member.

DeGrâce was born in Shippagan, New Brunswick, the son of Felix DeGrâce and Pauline Chiasson. DeGrâce was educated at the University of Moncton. He was a teacher and principal. DeGrâce also served as mayor of Shippagan. He was Minister of State for Tourism and Culture from 1998 to 1999. DeGrâce was defeated when he ran for reelection in 1999.

DeGrâce died on June 2, 2023, at the age of 81.
