= Louis Deveau =

Canadian academic administrator

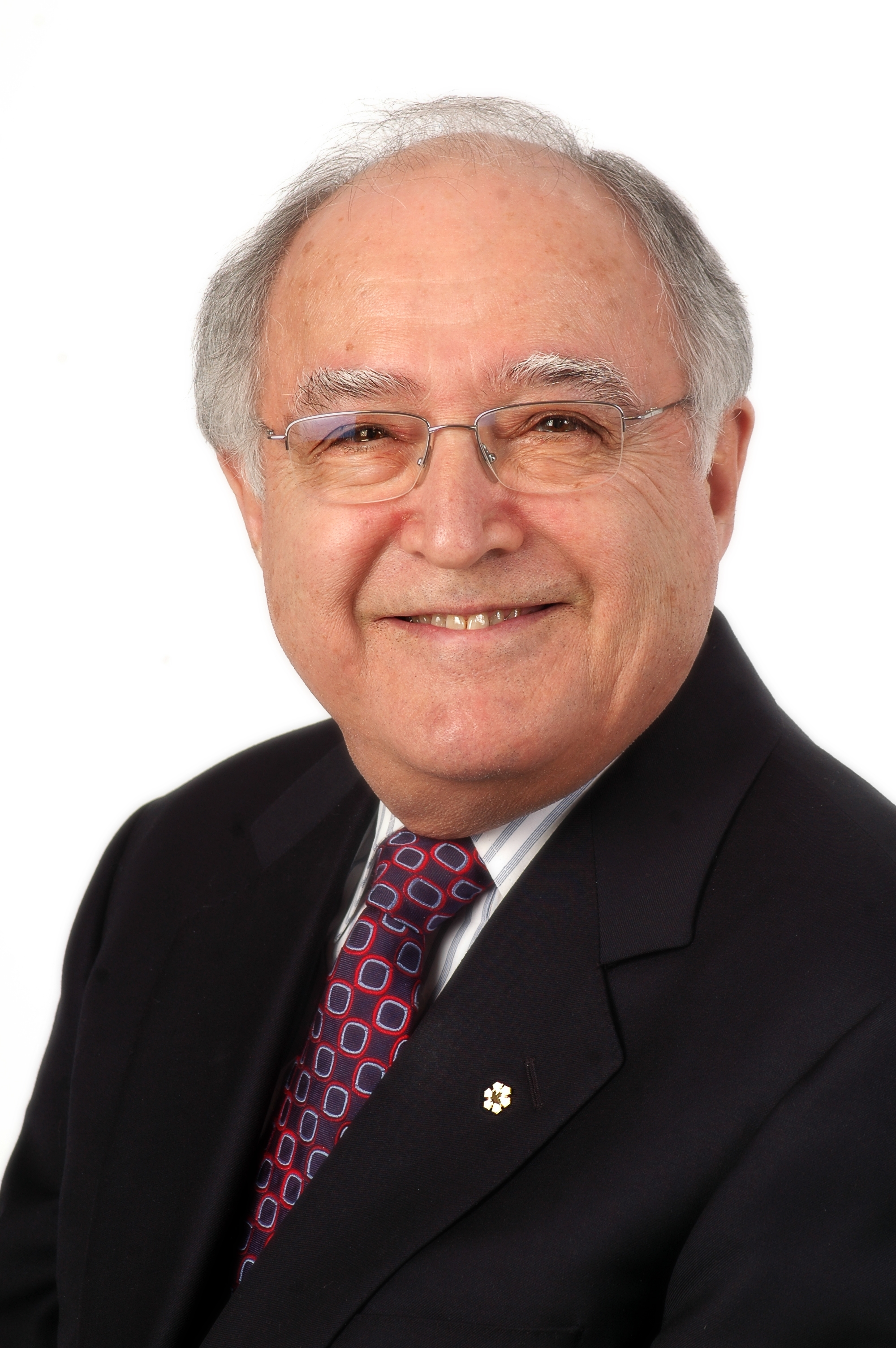
- Louis Deveau in 2007

Engineer and Entrepreneur

Personal details
- Born: 13 October 1931 (age 94) Salmon River, Nova Scotia
- Occupation: Founder of Acadian Seaplants

Louis Edouard Deveau (O.C, O.N.S, P.ENG, L.L.D. - Hon.) is a Canadian businessman and the founder of Acadian Seaplants Limited. He served as the Chancellor of Université Sainte-Anne in Pointe-de-l'Église, Nova Scotia from 2006 to November 2011.

Life and career

Born in Salmon River, Nova Scotia, Canada, Louis Deveau later founded Acadian Seaplants Limited, a science- and research-based company with global reach and impact. His parents were Marie Madeline (née Deveau) and Alphonse Joseph, the village blacksmith. Deveau was educated at Université Ste. Anne, Saint Mary’s University, and Nova Scotia Technical College, now the engineering school at Dalhousie University. All three of these universities would later award him Honorary Degrees, and in 2003, he was made an Officer of the Order of Canada in 2004. In 2013, the Ordre de la Francophonie recognized his lifelong contribution to French language education and culture in Canada when it named him as a member of L’Ordre de la Pléiade.

In 1980, at the age of 49, Deveau founded Acadian Seaplants from his son’s bedroom at the family home in Dartmouth, Nova Scotia. By 2021, the company was exporting products to more than 80 countries worldwide, employing scientists in dozens of nations. It also operated harvesting, manufacturing and research facilities in Canada, the United States, Ireland, Scotland, and England. Deveau’s success was anchored in research and innovation, an approach born of his view that a small Canadian company could never thrive against low-cost producers in what he saw as a commodity business.

Under Deveau’s leadership, Acadian Seaplants developed two innovative seaweed product lines – agricultural bio-stimulants (or extracts) manufactured at a facility in Cornwallis Nova Scotia, and seaweed vegetables grown for the demanding Japanese food market. The product for Japan was grown at a pioneering 100-acre land-based cultivation site at Charlesville, Nova Scotia. Deveau is widely respected for sponsoring leading-edge science that proved the effectiveness of seaweed extracts as agriculture bio-stimulants, and for showing that proof to the market by way of peer-reviewed publications in academic journals.

Prior to founding Acadian Seaplants, Deveau worked as a senior executive at Marine Colloids of Rockland, Maine, where he turned around the company’s struggling operations in Mexico and the Philippines. In the 1960s, as an employee of Canada’s Department of Fisheries and Oceans, he was a driving force behind the creation and development of the East Coast crab fishery, now the second most lucrative fishery in Atlantic Canada.

Today, Deveau (now 93) is still active in the day-to-day operations of Acadian Seaplants. His son Jean-Paul Deveau is the company’s Executive Chairman.

Personal

Louis Deveau, a passionate supporter of Acadian culture, grew up at a time when the Nova Scotia public education system operated exclusively in English. Deveau and his wife Fedora (née Robichaud), who celebrated their 67th anniversary in 2024, both became strong advocates of French-language education in Nova Scotia and across Canada.

Today, French immersion streams are offered to students across Nova Scotia, and French-language education is also available in major centres and many Acadian areas of the province. (The five Deveau children - Jean-Paul, Louise, Nicole, Monique and Michelle - were born between 1958 and 1968, at a time when primary school education was still offered in English only.)

Louis Deveau became a lifelong patron of French-language Education in Canada and Nova Scotia. He served as Chancellor of his alma mater Université Sainte-Anne between 2006 and 2011, as well as serving on its board. Today, he still acts as a trusted advisor to university president Allister Surette, who credits Deveau with helping transform the former Catholic institution into a progressive, business-friendly 21st Century university. The university’s Louis E. Deveau Entrepreneurship Centre was named in his honour. In 1997, Deveau also agreed to serve as the first chairman of the independent board of the Collège de l’Acadie. Louis and Fedora Deveau also supported dozens of Acadian festivals and events over the years, none more important to them than the Acadian Festival in the District of Clare, where they both grew up.
