= Trevor Holder =

Canadian politician (born 1973)

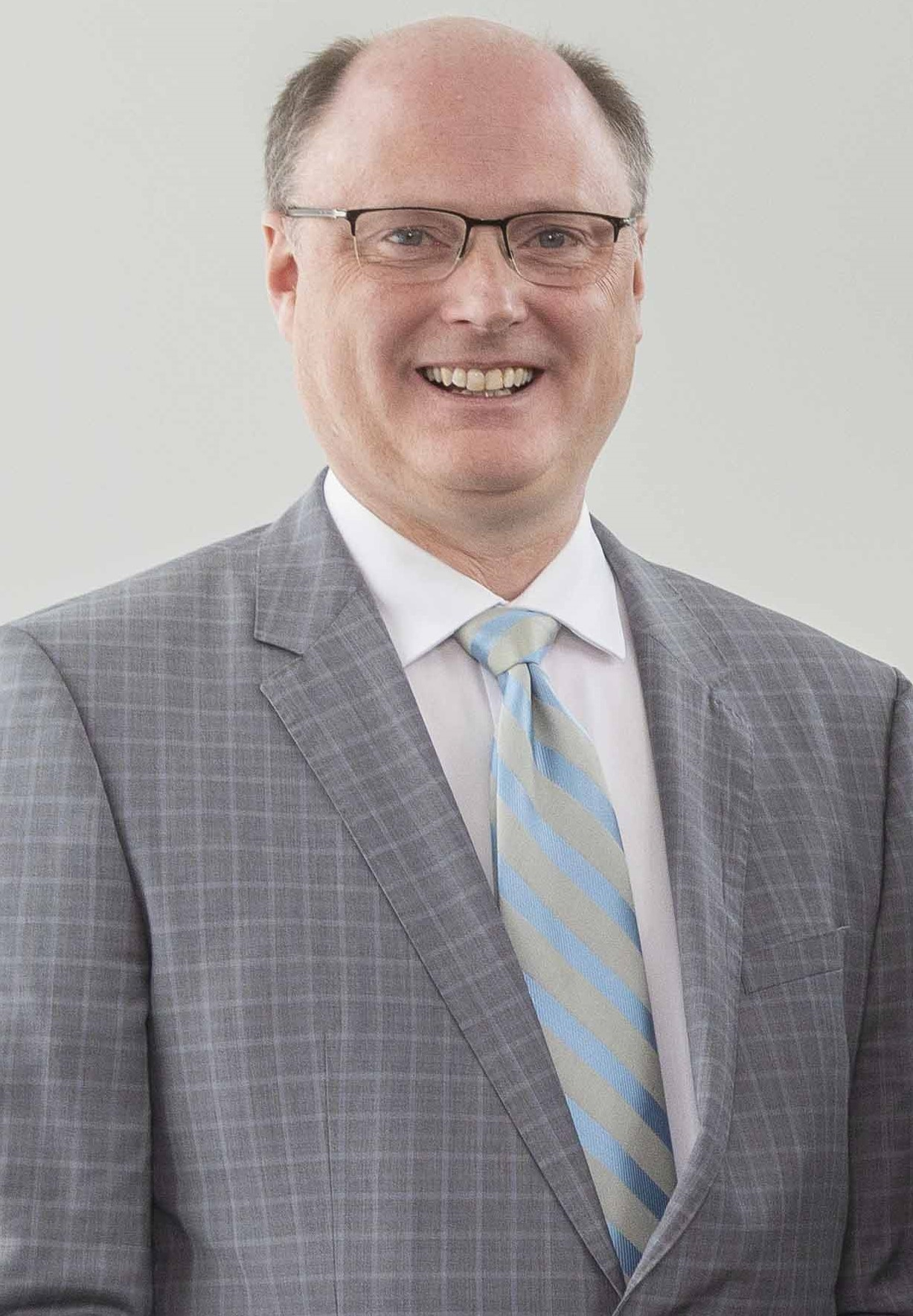
- Holder in 2023

Minister of Post-Secondary Education, Training, and Labour
- In office November 9, 2018 – June 23, 2023
- Premier: Blaine Higgs
- Preceded by: Roger Melanson (Post-Secondary Education); Gilles LePage (Labour, Employment and Population Growth)
- Succeeded by: Arlene Dunn

Minister of Tourism, Heritage, and Culture
- In office October 9, 2012 – October 7, 2014
- Premier: David Alward
- Preceded by: Himself (Culture, Tourism, and Healthy-Living)
- Succeeded by: Bill Fraser

Minister of Culture, Tourism, and Healthy-Living
- In office March 15, 2012 – October 9, 2012
- Premier: David Alward
- Preceded by: Himself (Tourism and Parks and Wellness, Culture, and Sports)
- Succeeded by: Himself (Tourism, Heritage, and Culture); Dorothy Shephard (Healthy and Inclusive Communities)

Minister of Wellness, Culture, and Sport
- In office October 12, 2010 – March 15, 2012
- Premier: David Alward
- Preceded by: Hédard Albert
- Succeeded by: Himself (Culture, Tourism, and Healthy-Living)

Minister of Tourism and Parks
- In office October 12, 2010 – March 15, 2012
- Premier: David Alward
- Preceded by: Brian Kenny
- Succeeded by: Himself (Culture, Tourism, and Healthy-Living)

Minister of Environment
- In office February 14, 2006 – October 3, 2006
- Premier: Bernard Lord
- Preceded by: Himself (Environment and Local Government)
- Succeeded by: Roland Haché

Member of the New Brunswick Legislative Assembly for Portland-Simonds
- In office September 22, 2014 – April 30, 2024
- Preceded by: District established

Member of the New Brunswick Legislative Assembly for Saint John Portland
- In office June 7, 1999 – September 22, 2014
- Preceded by: Leo McAdam
- Succeeded by: District abolished

Dean of the Legislative Assembly of New Brunswick
- In office August 21, 2014 – April 30, 2024 Serving with David Alward (2014 – 2015); Madeleine Dubé (2014 – 2018); Jody Carr (2014 – 2018); Kirk MacDonald (2014 – 2018)
- Preceded by: Dale Graham
- Succeeded by: Bruce Fitch

Personal details
- Born: May 8, 1973 (age 53) Saint John, New Brunswick, Canada
- Party: Progressive Conservative

Trevor Arthur Holder (born May 8, 1973) is a former Canadian politician. He served as a member of the Legislative Assembly of New Brunswick from 1999 to 2024. At the time of his resignation, he was the longest serving member of the legislature.

A 1995 graduate of the University of New Brunswick in Saint John, he earned a Bachelor of Arts degree in political science and history.

== Politics ==
A member of the Progressive Conservative Party, Holder first ran for the legislature in the 1995 provincial election losing in Saint John Portland with 33.3% to 38.6% for the victorious Liberal candidate Leo McAdam. Holder faced McAdam in a re-match in 1999 and won with 59.7% of the vote to McAdam's 26%.

Holder served as a backbencher for his first term and, following re-election in 2003 he became deputy speaker of the legislature. He was named to cabinet on November 21, 2005 as Minister of Environment and Local Government; he became Minister of Environment on February 14, 2006 when his department was split in two.

Holder was reelected in the 2006 election, in which the Tories were defeated by Shawn Graham's Liberal Party. While in opposition, he served on several legislative committees, including the standing committees on estimates, private bills and privileges. He was official Opposition Deputy House leader and official Opposition critic for areas of interest related to post-secondary education, poverty reduction, the Labour and Employment Board, and WorkSafe NB.

Holder was again reelected in the 2010 election, held September 27, 2010. On October 12, 2010, he was sworn in as Minister of Tourism and Parks and Minister of Wellness, Culture and Sport in the cabinet of Premier David Alward. On March 1, 2012, Holder became Minister of Culture, Tourism and Healthy Living when Alward restructured and combined several departments. The new department was split again on September 26, 2012, and Holder was named Minister of Tourism, Heritage and Culture.

Holder was re-elected in the 2014, 2018, and 2020 provincial elections.

On June 23, 2023, following the revision of Policy 713, Holder resigned from premier Blaine Higgs's cabinet as the former Minister of Post-Secondary Education, Training and Labour. Through a letter statement, he expressed the need for “some significant soul searching after a 24-year legislative career.” Reflecting on his cabinet service under three premiers, Holder mentioned his historical commitment to fighting for "constituents within a party and caucus structure." Noting a recent shift while under premier Higgs's leadership, he described the caucus as "less about consensus and more about him getting his own way."

On March 28, 2024, Holder announced in the legislature that he would not be a candidate in the next provincial election, scheduled to take place in October 2024.

On April 30, 2024, Holder resigned his seat from the legislature.
