= Shippagan-Les-Îles =

Provincial electoral district in New Brunswick, Canada

New Brunswick electoral district
- The riding of Shippagan-Les-Îles (as it exists from 2023) in relation to other New Brunswick electoral districts
- Coordinates: 47.760°N 64.662°W

Provincial electoral district
- Legislature: Legislative Assembly of New Brunswick
MLA
Eric Mallet
Liberal
- District created: 1973
- First contested: 1974
- Last contested: 2024

Demographics
- Population (2011): 13,506
- Electors (2013): 11,274

Shippagan-Les-Îles is a provincial electoral district for the Legislative Assembly of New Brunswick, Canada. It was previously named Shippagan-les-Îles from 1974 to 1995, Lamèque-Shippagan-Miscou from 1995 to 2014, and Shippagan-Lamèque-Miscou from 2014 to 2023. Its boundaries were largely unchanged from its creation until the 2013 redistribution extended it inland to the Pokemouche area, taken from Centre-Péninsule-Saint-Sauveur.

Following the 2023 redistribution, the riding was renamed Shippagan-Les-Îles.

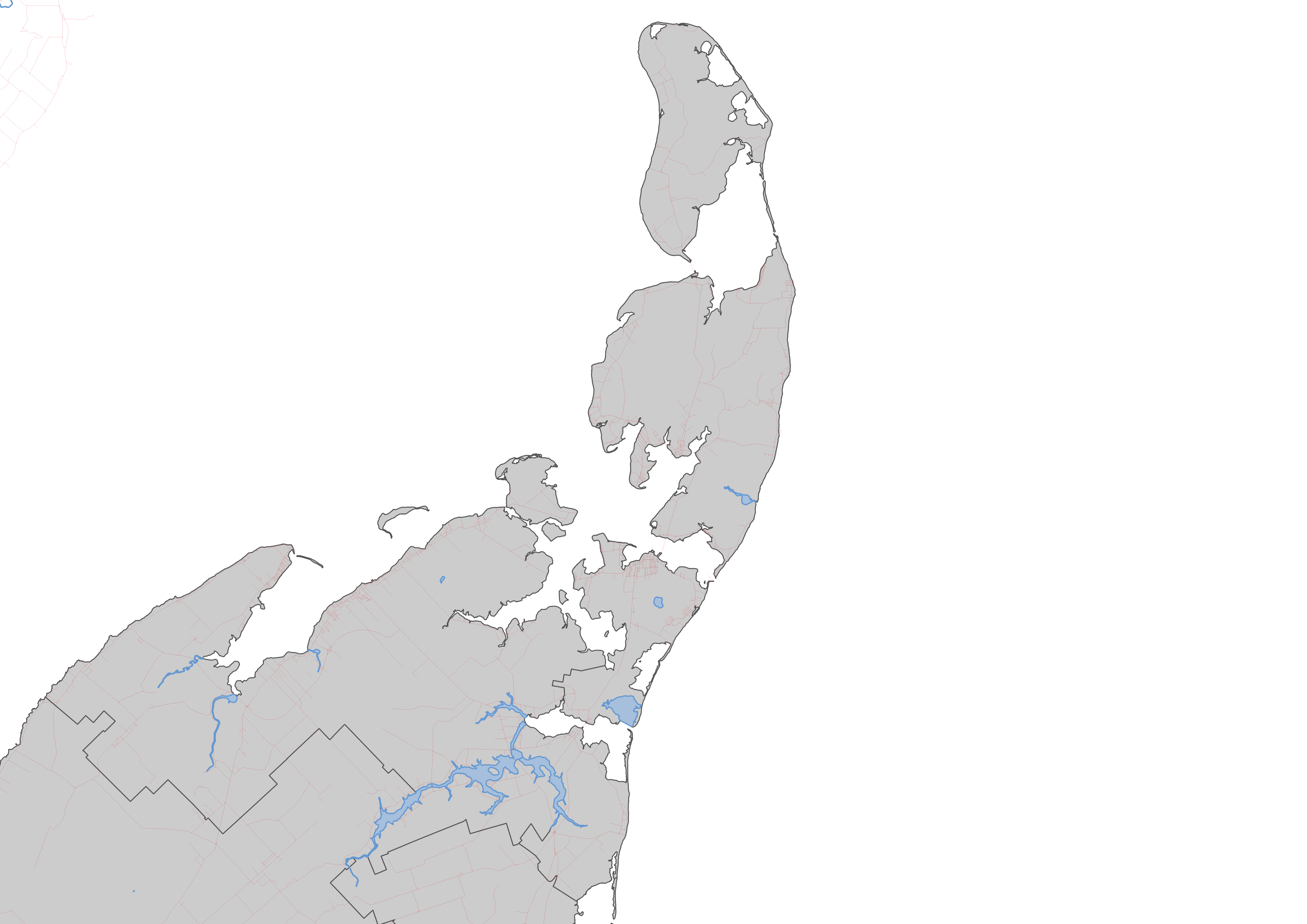
Shippagan-Les-Îles (as it exists from 2023) and the roads in the riding

== Members of the Legislative Assembly ==
Assembly	Years	Member	Party
Shippagan-les-Îles
Riding created from Gloucester
48th	1974–1978	André Robichaud	Liberal
49th	1978–1982	Jean Gauvin	Progressive Conservative
50th	1982–1987	Jean Gauvin	Progressive Conservative
51st	1987–1991	Aldéa Landry	Liberal
52nd	1991–1995	Jean Gauvin	Progressive Conservative
52nd	1995–1995	Jean Gauvin	Independent
Lamèque-Shippagan-Miscou
53rd	1995–1999	Jean-Camille DeGrâce	Liberal
54th	1999–2003	Paul Robichaud	Progressive Conservative
55th	2003–2006	Paul Robichaud	Progressive Conservative
56th	2006–2010	Paul Robichaud	Progressive Conservative
57th	2010–2014	Paul Robichaud	Progressive Conservative
Shippagan-Lamèque-Miscou
58th	2014–2018	Wilfred Roussel	Liberal
59th	2018–2020	Robert Gauvin	Progressive Conservative
59th	2020–2020	Robert Gauvin	Independent
60th	2020–2024	Eric Mallet	Liberal
Shippagan-Les-Îles
61st	2024–Present	Eric Mallet	Liberal

== Electoral results ==
=== Shippagan-Les-Îles ===
2024 New Brunswick general election
Party	Candidate	Votes	%	±%
Liberal	Éric Mallet	5,021	75.4%	-8.38
Green	Wilfred Roussel	1,111	16.7%	+9.23
Progressive Conservative	François Robichaud	530	8.0%	-0.75
Total valid votes		6,662		
Total rejected ballots				
Turnout				
Eligible voters				
Liberal hold		Swing		
Source: Elections New Brunswick

=== Shippagan-Lamèque-Miscou ===
2020 New Brunswick general election
Party	Candidate	Votes	%	±%
Liberal	Eric Mallet	6,834	83.78	+38.66
Progressive Conservative	Jean-Gérard Chiasson	714	8.75	-37.48
Green	Marie Leclerc	609	7.47	New
Total valid votes		8,157	100.00	
Total rejected ballots		24	0.29	-0.95
Turnout		8,181	74.73	-4.44
Eligible voters		10,947		
Liberal gain from Progressive Conservative		Swing		+38.08
Source: Elections New Brunswick

2018 New Brunswick general election
Party	Candidate	Votes	%	±%
Progressive Conservative	Robert Gauvin	4,048	46.25	+0.65
Liberal	Wilfred Roussel	3,949	45.12	-0.98
New Democratic	Albert Rousselle	578	6.60	+0.90
Independent	Philippe Tisseuil	178	2.03	
Total valid votes		8,753	98.76	
Total rejected ballots		110	1.24	+0.27
Turnout		8,863	79.18	+2.52
Eligible voters		11,194		
Progressive Conservative gain from Liberal		Swing		+0.82

2014 New Brunswick general election
Party	Candidate	Votes	%	±%
Liberal	Wilfred Roussel	4,014	46.10	+14.39
Progressive Conservative	Paul Robichaud	3,970	45.60	-13.29
New Democratic	Juliette Paulin	497	5.71	-3.70
Green	Tony Mallet	226	2.60	–
Total valid votes		8,707	99.03	
Total rejected ballots		85	0.97	
Turnout		8,792	76.65	
Eligible voters		11,470		
Liberal notional gain		Swing		+13.84
These results were declared after a judicial recount.

=== Lamèque-Shippagan-Miscou ===
2010 New Brunswick general election
Party	Candidate	Votes	%	±%
Progressive Conservative	Paul Robichaud	4,270	58.89	+1.38
Liberal	Alonzo Rail	2,299	31.71	-5.26
New Democratic	Armel T. Chiasson	682	9.41	+3.88
Total valid votes		7,251	100.0	
Total rejected ballots		116	1.57	
Turnout		7,367	80.94	
Eligible voters		9,102		
Progressive Conservative hold		Swing		+3.32

2006 New Brunswick general election
Party	Candidate	Votes	%	±%
Progressive Conservative	Paul Robichaud	4,348	57.51	-2.57
Liberal	Denis Roussel	2,795	36.97	+1.26
New Democratic	Juliette Paulin	418	5.53	+1.33
Total valid votes		7,561	100.0	
Total rejected ballots		82	1.07	
Turnout		7,643	78.22	
Eligible voters		9,771		
Progressive Conservative notional hold		Swing		-1.92

2003 New Brunswick general election
Party	Candidate	Votes	%	±%
Progressive Conservative	Paul Robichaud	4,788	60.08	-5.09
Liberal	Denis Roussel	2,846	35.71	+7.45
New Democratic	Jean-Baptiste Bezeau	335	4.20	-2.37
Total valid votes		7,969	100.0	
Progressive Conservative hold		Swing		-6.27

1999 New Brunswick general election
Party	Candidate	Votes	%	±%
Progressive Conservative	Paul Robichaud	5,910	65.17	+16.97
Liberal	Jean-Camille DeGrâce	2,563	28.26	-20.27
New Democratic	Denis Doiron	596	6.57	+3.96
Total valid votes		9,069	100.0	
Progressive Conservative gain from Liberal		Swing		+18.62

1995 New Brunswick general election
Party	Candidate	Votes	%	±%
Liberal	Jean-Camille DeGrâce	4,124	48.53	-0.57
Progressive Conservative	Paul Robichaud	4,096	48.20	-1.40
New Democratic	Daniel Brindle	222	2.61	+1.31
Independent	Gilles Godin	56	0.66	–
Total valid votes		8,498	100.0	
Liberal gain from Independent		Swing		+0.42

=== Shippagan-les-Îles ===
1991 New Brunswick general election
Party	Candidate	Votes	%	±%
Progressive Conservative	Jean Gauvin	4,881	49.60	+8.41
Liberal	Aldéa Landry	4,831	49.10	-8.68
New Democratic	John Gagnon	128	1.30	+0.27
Total valid votes		9,840	100.0	
Progressive Conservative gain from Liberal		Swing		+8.54

1987 New Brunswick general election
Party	Candidate	Votes	%	±%
Liberal	Aldéa Landry	5,601	57.78	+18.33
Progressive Conservative	Jean Gauvin	3,993	41.19	-18.08
New Democratic	Charles Rail	100	1.03	–
Total valid votes		9,694	100.0	
Liberal gain from Progressive Conservative		Swing		+18.20

1982 New Brunswick general election
Party	Candidate	Votes	%	±%
Progressive Conservative	Jean Gauvin	5,238	59.27	+17.54
Liberal	André Robichaud	3,487	39.45	+5.27
Parti acadien	Laval Auclair	113	1.28	-5.15
Total valid votes		8,838	100.0	
Progressive Conservative hold		Swing		+6.14

1978 New Brunswick general election
Party	Candidate	Votes	%	±%
Progressive Conservative	Jean Gauvin	3,023	41.73	+6.95
Liberal	André Robichaud	2,476	34.18	-1.65
Independent	Michel Haché	1,280	17.67	–
Parti acadien	Laval Auclair	466	6.43	–
Total valid votes		7,245	100.0	
Progressive Conservative gain from Liberal		Swing		+4.30

1974 New Brunswick general election
Party	Candidate	Votes	%
Liberal	André Robichaud	2,289	35.83
Progressive Conservative	Jean C. Chiasson	2,222	34.78
Independent	Gastien Godin	1,877	29.38
Total valid votes		6,388	100.0
This riding was created from the multi-member riding of Gloucester, which elected 5 (of 5) Liberal members in 1970. One of these seats was won by a Progressive Conservative in a 1972 by-election. André Robichaud was one of five incumbents.

== See also ==
- List of New Brunswick provincial electoral districts
- Canadian provincial electoral districts
