= Department of Tourism, Heritage and Culture =

Agency overview
- Jurisdiction: New Brunswick
- Parent department: Government of New Brunswick

The Department of Tourism, Heritage and Culture is a department of the government of New Brunswick.

It was created in 2001 as the Department of Tourism and Parks from the Business New Brunswick and Department of Investment and Exports. Its mandate promote the province's tourism industry and maintain its official provincial parks.

Its mandate was widely expanded in March 2012 when Premier David Alward restructured government. It was merged with the Department of Wellness, Culture and Sport to form the new Department of Culture, Tourism and Healthy-Living. This new department was short-lived however with it being split back up in October 2012 into the Department of Tourism, Heritage and Culture (which held the mandate of the former Department of Tourism and Parks as well as an oversight of community arts development and heritage programs) and a Department of Healthy and Inclusive Communities.

== Ministers ==
#	Minister	Term	Government
Minister of Tourism and Parks
1.	Paul Robichaud	October 9, 2001 - June 27, 2003	under Bernard Lord
2.	Joan MacAlpine	June 27, 2003 - October 3, 2006	under Bernard Lord
3.	Stuart Jamieson	October 3, 2006 - February 5, 2010	under Shawn Graham
4.	Hédard Albert	February 5, 2010 - May 10, 2010 (acting)	under Shawn Graham
5.	Brian Kenny	May 10, 2010 - Oct. 12, 2010	under Shawn Graham
6.	Trevor Holder	Oct. 12, 2010 - Mar. 15, 2012	under David Alward
Minister of Culture, Tourism and Healthy-Living
7.	Trevor Holder	Mar. 15, 2012 - Oct. 9, 2012	under David Alward
Minister of Tourism, Heritage and Culture
8.	Trevor Holder	Oct. 9, 2012 – October 7, 2014	under David Alward
9.	Bill Fraser	October 7, 2014 - June 5, 2016	under Brian Gallant
10.	John Ames	June 6, 2016 - October 5, 2018	under Brian Gallant
11.	Gilles LePage	October 6, 2018 - November 8 2018	under Brian Gallant
12.	Robert Gauvin	November 9, 2018 - February 24, 2020	under Blaine Higgs
13.	Bruce Fitch	February 24, 2020 - September 29, 2020	under Blaine Higgs
14.	Tammy Scott-Wallace	September 29, 2020 - November 2, 2024	under Blaine Higgs
15.	Isabelle Thériault	November 2, 2024 - Present	under Susan Holt
