= Jean Gauvin =

Canadian politician

MLA for Shippagan-les-Îles
- In office 1978–1987
- Preceded by: André Robichaud
- Succeeded by: Aldéa Landry
- In office 1991–1995
- Preceded by: Aldéa Landry
- Succeeded by: district abolished

Personal details
- Born: November 15, 1945 Inkerman, New Brunswick
- Died: June 6, 2007 (aged 61) Bathurst, New Brunswick
- Party: Progressive Conservative Party of New Brunswick
- Spouse: Jacqueline Bezeau (m.1965)
- Children: Robert Gauvin (son)
- Profession: Teacher

Jean Gauvin (November 15, 1945 – June 6, 2007) was a Canadian politician. He served in the Legislative Assembly of New Brunswick from 1978 to 1987 and from 1991 to 1995, as a Progressive Conservative member for the constituency of Shippagan-les-Îles.

His son Robert Gauvin was elected to the Legislative Assembly of New Brunswick in 2018.
