= Government of New Brunswick =

Canadian provincial government

- French: Gouvernement du Nouveau-Brunswick
- Provincial government

Overview
- Established: July 1, 1867
- Country: Canada
- Polity: Province
- Leader: Premier; Susan Holt
- Appointed by: Lieutenant Governor; Louise Imbeault
- Main organ: Executive Council
- Responsible to: Legislative Assembly
- Headquarters: Fredericton
- Website: www.gnb.ca

The Government of New Brunswick (French: Gouvernement du Nouveau-Brunswick) is the provincial government of the province of New Brunswick. Its powers and structure are set out in the Constitution Act, 1867.

The Province of New Brunswick has a unicameral legislature, the New Brunswick Legislature, consisting of the Lieutenant Governor and the Legislative Assembly, which operates in the framework of a Westminster-style parliamentary constitutional monarchy. The political party that, either by itself or in combination with another party supporting them, wins the largest number of seats in the legislature normally forms the Government with the party's leader becoming premier of the province, the head of government.

== Role of the Crown ==
The functions of the sovereign, King Charles III, King of Canada and King in Right of New Brunswick, are exercised by the Lieutenant Governor, appointed by the Governor General of Canada on the recommendation of the Prime Minister of Canada, in consultation with the Premier of New Brunswick.

== Cabinet ==
Name	Title	Mandate Letter
Susan Holt	Premier, President of the Executive Council, Minister responsible for Official Languages	Mandate Letter
René Legacy	Deputy Premier, Minister of Finance and Treasury Board, Minister responsible for Energy, Minister responsible for the Right to Information and Protection of Privacy Act	Mandate Letter
Rob McKee	Minister of Justice, Attorney General, Minister responsible for Addictions and Mental Health Services	Mandate Letter
John Dornan	Minister of Health	Mandate Letter
Claire Johnson	Minister of Education and Early Childhood Development	Mandate Letter
Keith Chiasson	Minister of Indigenous Affairs	Mandate Letter
Cindy Miles	Minister of Social Development, Minister responsible for the Economic and Social Inclusion Corporation	Mandate Letter
Chuck Chiasson	Minister of Transportation and Infrastructure	Mandate Letter
Gilles LePage	Minister of Environment and Climate Change, Minister responsible for the Regional Development Corporation	Mandate Letter
Aaron Kennedy	Minister of Local Government, Minister responsible for Service New Brunswick	Mandate Letter
Isabelle Thériault	Minister of Tourism, Heritage and Culture	Mandate Letter
Robert Gauvin	Minister of Public Safety, Minister responsible for la Francophonie	Mandate Letter
Alyson Townsend	Minister of Post-Secondary Education, Training and Labour, Minister responsible for the Research and Productivity Council, Minister responsible for the Regulatory Accountability and Reporting Act	Mandate Letter
John Herron	Minister of Natural Resources	Mandate Letter
Pat Finnigan	Minister of Agriculture, Aquaculture and Fisheries	Mandate Letter
Lyne Chantal Boudreau	Minister responsible for Seniors, Minister responsible for Women’s Equality	Mandate Letter
Jean-Claude D’Amours	Minister of Intergovernmental Affairs, Minister responsible for Immigration, Minister responsible for Military Affairs	Mandate Letter
David Hickey	Minister responsible for the New Brunswick Housing Corporation	Mandate Letter
Luke Randall	Minister responsible for Opportunities NB, Minister responsible for Economic Development and Small Business, Minister responsible for NB Liquor and Cannabis NB	Mandate Letter

== Departments ==
- Department of Agriculture, Aquaculture and Fisheries
- Opportunities NB, former Department of Economic Development
- Department of Education
- Department of Energy and Mines
- Department of Environment and Local Government
- Department of Finance
- Department of Government Services
- Department of Health
- Department of Human Resources
- Department of Intergovernmental Affairs
- Department of Justice
- Department of Natural Resources
- Department of Post-Secondary Education, Training and Labour
- Department of Public Safety
- Department of Social Development
- Department of Tourism, Heritage and Culture
- Department of Transportation and Infrastructure
- Department of Healthy and Inclusive Communities

== Government Budget ==
Each year, the government presents a budget to the legislature, outlining expenditures from the previous year ("Revised" figures) and projected spending for the upcoming year ("Estimates"). The table below summarizes the data from the latest budget.

Department	2023–2024 Revised (How much was spent)	2024–2025 Estimate (How much they think they will spend)	Percentage Change	$ expected to be spent per person 2024–2025
Agriculture, Aquaculture, and Fisheries	$47,876,000	$48,470,000	1.24%	$57
Education and Early Childhood Development	$1,711,145,000	$1,910,758,000	11.67%	$2,248
Environment and Local Government	$130,035,000	$173,374,000	33.33%	$204
Executive Council Office	$11,471,000	$11,714,000	2.12%	$14
Finance and Treasury Board	$90,820,000	$49,081,000	−45.96%	$58
General Government	$1,062,385,000	$1,210,131,000	13.91%	$1,424
Health	$3,796,484,000	$3,798,167,000	0.04%	$4,468
Justice and Public Safety	$379,532,000	$374,842,000	−1.24%	$441
Legislative Assembly	$33,037,000	$47,336,000	43.28%	$56
Natural Resources and Energy Development	$172,404,000	$210,215,000	21.93%	$247
New Brunswick Housing Corporation	$134,193,000	$196,341,000	46.31%	$231
Opportunities New Brunswick	$36,763,000	$46,549,000	26.62%	$55
Post-Secondary Education, Training, and Labour	$723,988,000	$750,259,000	3.63%	$883
Regional Development Corporation	$50,841,000	$80,873,000	59.07%	$95
Service of the Public Debt	$542,400,000	$608,000,000	12.09%	$715
Social Development	$1,553,767,000	$1,663,030,000	7.03%	$1,957
Tourism, Heritage and Culture	$75,959,000	$80,680,000	6.22%	$95
Transportation and Infrastructure	$381,073,000	$396,466,000	4.04%	$466
Total Expenses	$11,359,659,000	$12,113,180,000	6.63%	$14,251
Investment in Tangible Capital Assets	-$19,652,000	-$18,200,000	-7.39%	-$21
Inter-account Transactions	-$17,324,000	-$28,145,000	62.46%	-$33
TOTAL EXPENSE	$11,322,683,000	$12,066,835,000	6.57%	$14,196

== Offices ==
- Executive Council Office
- Office of the Attorney General
- Office of the Premier

== Agencies/Boards ==
- Efficiency New Brunswick
- New Brunswick Arts Board
- New Brunswick Emergency Measures Organization
- New Brunswick Insurance Board
- Premier's Council on the Status of Disabled Persons

== Commissions/Corporations ==
- Financial and Consumer Services Commission
- Kings Landing Historical Settlement
- NB Power
- New Brunswick Credit Union Deposit Insurance Corporation
- New Brunswick Energy and Utilities Board
- New Brunswick Human Rights Commission
- New Brunswick Investment Management Corporation
- New Brunswick Liquor Corporation
- New Brunswick Police Commission
- Regional Development Corporation
- Service New Brunswick
- Village Historique Acadien
- WorkSafe NB
- Ambulance New Brunswick

== See also ==
- Politics of New Brunswick
- Lieutenant Governor of New Brunswick
- Premier of New Brunswick
- Legislative Assembly of New Brunswick
- Executive Council of New Brunswick
- Administrative divisions of New Brunswick
