= Deputy premier (Canada) =

Canadian deputy head of government

In Canada, a deputy premier is the deputy head of government of a province or territory. As of April 2026, eleven of thirteen provinces and territories have a deputy premier in office.

As the prime minister–premier distinction does not exist in French, the federal and provincial deputy first ministers are styled as vice-premier ministre (masculine) or vice-première ministre (feminine).

== List of current Canadian deputy premiers ==
Ordered by entry to Confederation

Jurisdiction	Office Holder	Date of appointment	Premier Party Affiliation	Ref.
Federal: Deputy prime minister
Canada	Title not in use (since December 16, 2024)		Mark Carney; Liberal	
Provincial/territorial: Deputy premiers
Ontario	Sylvia Jones	June 24, 2022	Doug Ford; Progressive Conservative	
Quebec	Catherine Gentilcore	October 21, 2026	Paul St-Pierre Plamondon; Parti Québécois	
Nova Scotia	Barbara Adams	October 24, 2024	Tim Houston; Progressive Conservative	
New Brunswick	René Legacy	November 2, 2024	Susan Holt; Liberal	
Manitoba	Uzoma Asagwara	October 18, 2023	Wab Kinew; NDP	
British Columbia	Claire Rattée	November 20, 2026	Lorne Doerkson; Conservative	
Prince Edward Island	Title not in use (since December 12, 2025)		Rob Lantz; Progressive Conservative	
Alberta	Mike Ellis	June 9, 2023	Danielle Smith; United Conservative	
Saskatchewan	Jim Reiter	November 7, 2024	Scott Moe; Saskatchewan Party	
Newfoundland and Labrador	Barry Petten	October 29, 2025	Tony Wakeham; Progressive Conservative	
Yukon	Title not in use (since November 22, 2025)		Currie Dixon; Yukon Party	
Northwest Territories	Caroline Wawzonek	December 12, 2023	R.J. Simpson (consensus government)	
Nunavut	George Hickes	November 20, 2025	John Main (consensus government)	

== See also ==
- Premier (Canada)
- Deputy Prime Minister of Canada
- Deputy Premier of British Columbia
- Deputy Premier of Manitoba
- Deputy Premier of Ontario
- Deputy Premier of Prince Edward Island
- Deputy Premier of Quebec
