= Consensus government in Canada =

Consensus government is a form of government by consensus decision-making in Canada used in two of Canada's three federal territories (Northwest Territories and Nunavut) as well as in Nunatsiavut, an autonomous area in the province of Newfoundland and Labrador.

The population of these jurisdictions are majority Indigenous peoples. The system developed in the Northwest Territories beginning during the 1970s, and was adopted by Nunavut when it came into existence in 1999.

== Origins and development ==
In 1905, the provinces of Alberta and Saskatchewan were separated from the then much larger Northwest Territories. The Yukon Territory had been created in 1898 to facilitate governance of the Yukon goldfields, and both Ontario and Quebec were granted large areas of northern lands. The remaining lands were considered to be unsettled by Europeans, largely inhabited by Dene, Métis and Inuit, and not requiring much governance. The Commissioner of the Northwest Territories, a functionary reporting to the Minister of Indian and Northern Affairs in Ottawa, was given plenary governing authority.

A legislative council was convened from time to time of worthy notables, learned in matters involving the natives and northern development. The 2nd Council of the Northwest Territories met sporadically, typically in Ottawa, and passed ordinances for the benefit of the territory.

Beginning during the 1950s and 1960s, some residents of the territory were appointed or elected to the council. These elected members were initially non-native, but in growing number, were Dene, Métis and Inuit. Members began to secure positions on the executive council, replacing appointed Ottawa administrators, and began to insist on a devolution of authority. In a series of letters, the Minister of Indian and Northern Affairs gradually curtailed the authority of the commissioner and affirmed the authority of the assembly.

The first fully elected executive council elected in 1980 was led by George Braden, and the system of consensus government developed from that date.

== Choosing leadership ==
Members of the legislature are elected as independents from single member districts by simple plurality voting. The legislature selects first the speaker, then the premier, and finally the cabinet members from amongst themselves. In each instance the candidate must obtain a majority of the votes cast. This means that multiple rounds of voting, a variant of the two-round system, may occur before the successful candidate is elected.

The premier has three main authorities. The premier:

1. names the portfolios of each minister and can remove or adjust these,
2. controls the agenda of the cabinet/executive council, and
3. hires, rewards, and dismisses the deputy department heads.

The passage of legislation and the government is dependent on retaining the confidence of the legislature. However, due to the absence of political parties there is no formal opposition and instead of party caucuses members regularly participate in a caucus of all members of the legislature.

== List of consensus governments in Canada ==
- Legislative Assembly of the Northwest Territories
- Legislative Assembly of Nunavut
- Nunatsiavut Assembly
