= John Herron (New Brunswick politician) =

Canadian politician

John Patrick Herron MLA
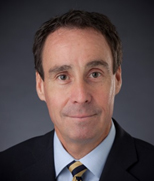

Minister of Natural Resources
- Incumbent
- Assumed office November 2, 2024

Member of the New Brunswick Legislative Assembly for Hampton-Fundy-St. Martins
- Incumbent
- Assumed office October 21, 2024
- Preceded by: Gary Crossman

Member of Parliament for Fundy Royal
- In office June 2, 1997 – June 28, 2004
- Preceded by: Paul Zed
- Succeeded by: Rob Moore

Personal details
- Born: October 21, 1964 (age 61) Kentville, Nova Scotia
- Party: New Brunswick Liberal Association
- Other political affiliations: Progressive Conservative (1997–2004); Independent (2004); Liberal (2004–present)
- Spouse: Heather Jane Libbey
- Children: 2
- Education: Acadia University (BA History), Saint Mary's University (MBA)
- Profession: Energy Regulator

John Patrick Herron (born October 21, 1964) is a Canadian politician. He was the member of Parliament (MP) for the New Brunswick riding of Fundy Royal from 1997 to 2004. Originally a Progressive Conservative, he left the PC Party and ran unsuccessfully for re-election as a Liberal in 2004. He returned to politics in the 2024 New Brunswick general election, winning election as a Liberal MLA for Hampton-Fundy-St. Martins.

== Federal political career ==
Herron was first elected to the House of Commons in the 1997 federal election as a candidate of the Progressive Conservative Party of Canada (PC Party). He was re-elected in the 2000 election. Herron was one of a handful of new Progressive Conservative "young Turk" parliamentarians – along with Scott Brison, André Bachand, and Peter MacKay – considered the youthful leadership material that would restore the ailing PC Party.

After Progressive Conservative leader Jean Charest resigned in April 1998 to lead Quebec Federalists as leader of the Quebec Liberal Party, Herron and fellow MP Jim Jones met with Stephen Harper to explore Harper's interest in the leadership of the Progressive Conservative Party. Herron concluded that there was a lack of alignment between the two on a series of public policy matters, and later teamed with Scott Brison to support Joe Clark's candidacy and his subsequent return as leader of the Progressive Conservative Party of Canada.

Herron was criticized following the 2003 PC leadership election when he abandoned the campaign of Scott Brison to support Peter MacKay before the second ballot. Brison was dropped from the voting when he won just three votes fewer than Jim Prentice on the second ballot. Many blamed this loss on Herron and a handful of his riding delegates who followed him to the MacKay camp.

Herron, often described as a Red Tory for his progressive leanings on social issues, was a member of the Progressive Conservative Party until December 2003; he did not support its merger with the Canadian Alliance into the Conservative Party of Canada in 2003 and he refused to join the new party. On February 6, 2004, he announced that he would sit for the remainder of the Parliamentary session as an "independent Progressive Conservative", and that he would run in the 2004 election as a candidate for the Liberal Party of Canada. One of Herron's last official acts as a sitting MP was his deliverance of the "Progressive Conservative party caucus" tribute to retiring party leader Joe Clark in May 2004.

Herron lost his seat in the 2004 election to Conservative Party candidate Rob Moore.

== After federal politics ==
Herron served as president of the Atlantica Centre for Energy from 2008 to 2013 before being appointed by the provincial Progressive Conservative government to a full-time position on the quasi-judicial Energy and Utilities Board for a term of ten years.

On May 11, 2024, Herron was nominated as the Liberal candidate for the riding of Hampton-Fundy-St. Martins the 2024 provincial election in New Brunswick, in which he was elected in. On November 1, 2024, it was announced that he would serve in cabinet as Minister of Natural Resources. He has been identified as a Blue Liberal.

== Personal life ==
Herron continues to reside in Bloomfield, New Brunswick. He is married to Heather Jane Libbey of Cornwall, Ontario. He has two children from a previous marriage.

== Electoral history ==
2024 New Brunswick general election: Hampton-Fundy-St. Martins
Party	Candidate	Votes	%	±%
Liberal	John Herron	3,259	39.31	+25.8
Progressive Conservative	Faytene Grasseschi	3,035	36.61	-23.8
Green	Laura Myers	1,553	18.73	+7.5
New Democratic	Gordie Stackhouse	171	2.07	-0.9
People's Alliance	Peter Graham	153	1.85	-10.2
Libertarian	Barbara Dempsey	120	1.45	
Total valid votes		8,291	99.78	
Total rejected ballots		18	0.22	
Turnout		8,309	70.87	
Eligible voters		11,724		
Liberal gain from Progressive Conservative		Swing		+24.8
Source: Elections New Brunswick

2004 Canadian federal election: Fundy Royal
Party	Candidate	Votes	%	±%	Expenditures
Conservative	Rob Moore	14,997	44.82	−18.46	$63,125.86
Liberal	John Herron	11,635	34.77	+5.30	$52,913.85
New Democratic	Pat Hanratty	5,417	16.19	+8.99	$2,925.27
Green	Karin Bach	1,051	3.14	–	none listed
Independent	David Amos	358	1.07	–	none listed
Total valid votes/expense limit		33,458	100.0		$71,567
Total rejected, unmarked and declined ballots		231	0.69		
Turnout		33,689	62.56		
Eligible voters		54,113			
Conservative notional gain from Progressive Conservative		Swing		−11.88	
Changes from 2000 are based on redistributed results. Conservative Party change is based on the combination of Canadian Alliance and Progressive Conservative Party totals.

2000 Canadian federal election: Fundy Royal
Party	Candidate	Votes	%	±%
Progressive Conservative	John Herron	15,279	40.51	−1.01
Liberal	John King	11,422	30.28	+4.96
Alliance	Rob Moore	8,392	22.25	−0.68
New Democratic	John Calder	2,628	6.97	−2.44
Total valid votes		37,721	100.00	

Results for the Canadian Alliance from 1997 are based on the results of its predecessor, the Reform Party.

1997 Canadian federal election: Fundy Royal
Party	Candidate	Votes	%	±%
Progressive Conservative	John Herron	16,715	41.52	+13.11
Liberal	Paul Zed	10,192	25.32	−21.05
Reform	Roger Brown	9,229	22.93	+5.20
New Democratic	Larry Washburn	3,790	9.41	+4.61
Natural Law	Janice Sharon MacMillan	329	0.82	
Total valid votes		40,255	100.00	
