= George Burpee Jones =

Canadian politician (1866–1950)

The Honourable George Burpee Jones
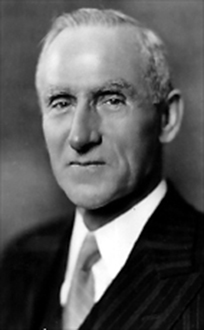

Member of the Legislative Assembly of New Brunswick for Kings
- In office 1908–1921

Member of the Canadian Parliament for Royal
- In office 1921–1935
- Preceded by: Hugh Havelock McLean
- Succeeded by: Alfred Johnson Brooks

Senator for New Brunswick, New Brunswick
- In office July 20, 1935 – April 27, 1950
- Appointed by: R. B. Bennett

Personal details
- Born: January 9, 1866 Belleisle Bay, New Brunswick
- Died: April 27, 1950 (aged 84)
- Party: Provincial: Conservative; Federal: Conservative
- Cabinet: Minister of Labour (1926)

George Burpee Jones (January 9, 1866 – April 27, 1950) was a Canadian merchant and politician.

== Biography ==
Born in Belleisle Bay, New Brunswick, Jones represented King's County in the Legislative Assembly of New Brunswick from 1908 to 1921. He was first elected to the House of Commons of Canada in the riding of Royal in the 1921 federal election. A Conservative, he was re-elected in 1925, 1926, and 1930. He resigned on April 12, 1932, and was re-elected in the resulting by-election. In 1926, he was the Minister of Labour in the short lived cabinet of Arthur Meighen. He was appointed to the Senate of Canada in 1935 representing the senatorial division of New Brunswick and served until his death in 1950.

== Electoral history ==
By-election on 27 June 1932
Party	Candidate	Votes	%	±%
Conservative	George Burpee Jones	7,698	51.93	-5.21
Liberal	Donald V. White	7,127	48.07	+5.21
Total valid votes		14,825	100.00	

1930 Canadian federal election: Fundy Royal
Party	Candidate	Votes	%	±%
Conservative	George Burpee Jones	7,698	57.14	+1.52
Liberal	Donald V. White	5,774	42.86	−1.52
Total valid votes		13,472	100.00	
Source: lop.parl.ca

1926 Canadian federal election: Fundy Royal
Party	Candidate	Votes	%	±%
Conservative	George Burpee Jones	7,485	55.62	−1.52
Liberal	Duncan McAlister	5,973	44.38	+1.52
Total valid votes		13,458	100.00	

1925 Canadian federal election: Fundy Royal
Party	Candidate	Votes	%	±%
Conservative	George Burpee Jones	7,485	57.14	+16.47
Liberal	Duncan McAlister	5,614	42.86	+3.04
Total valid votes		13,099	100.00	

1921 Canadian federal election: Fundy Royal
Party	Candidate	Votes	%	±%
Conservative	George Burpee Jones	5,551	40.67	−27.10
Liberal	Duncan McAlister	5,434	39.82	+7.59
Independent	Harold Perkins	2,663	19.51	
Total valid votes		13,648	100.00	
