= Jack Fairweather =

Jack Fairweather may refer to:

- Jack Fairweather (politician) (1878–1948), lawyer and political figure in New Brunswick, Canada
- Jack Fairweather (writer) (born 1978), British journalist and author
