= Alaina Lockhart =

Canadian politician (born 1974)

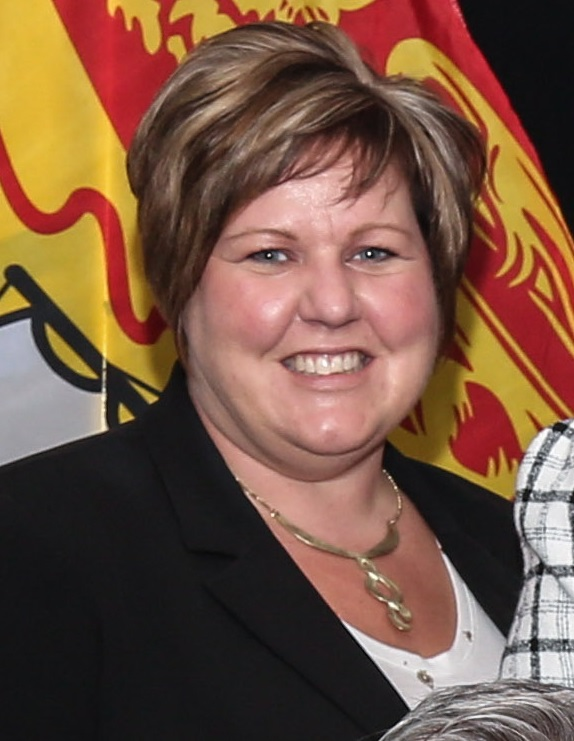

Parliamentary Secretary to the Minister of Small Business and Tourism (2017–2019)

Member of Parliament for Fundy Royal
- In office October 19, 2015 – September 11, 2019
- Preceded by: Rob Moore
- Succeeded by: Rob Moore

Personal details
- Born: May 26, 1974 (age 52)
- Citizenship: Canadian
- Party: Liberal Party of Canada
- Spouse: Rick Lockhart
- Children: Lauren Lockhart
- Education: University of New Brunswick, Saint-John Campus
- Committees: Veterans Affairs, Agriculture and Agri-Foods
- Awards: Chamber of Commerce Woman Entrepreneur Award
- Website: https://alainalockhart.liberal.ca

Alaina Lockhart (born May 26, 1974) is a Canadian Liberal politician who represented the riding of Fundy Royal in the House of Commons of Canada from 2015 to 2019. She took on the role of Parliamentary Secretary to Small Business and Tourism, as well as Official Languages and La Francophonie. She has served as a member of the Agriculture and Agri-food Standing Committee, and the Veterans Affairs Standing Committee. Lockhart lost her seat in the 2019 Canadian federal election to Rob Moore.

== Early life and education ==
As a child, Lockhart was a member of the Girl Guides of Canada for eight years, and her daughter has registered with the program as well.

Lockhart graduated from the University of New Brunswick in Saint John, New Brunswick with a bachelor's degree in business administration, majoring in human resource management.

== Business career ==
After graduating from university, Lockhart worked as a manager for a corporate company, up until the birth of her first child.

In 2004, she founded her own bridal salon business, Lockhart Weddings and Special Occasions located in Sussex, New Brunswick. In 2010, Lockhart was presented with the Chamber of Commerce Woman Entrepreneur Award, for her success with her business. The business was sold in June 2017 to Sherry McCormick.

== Political career ==
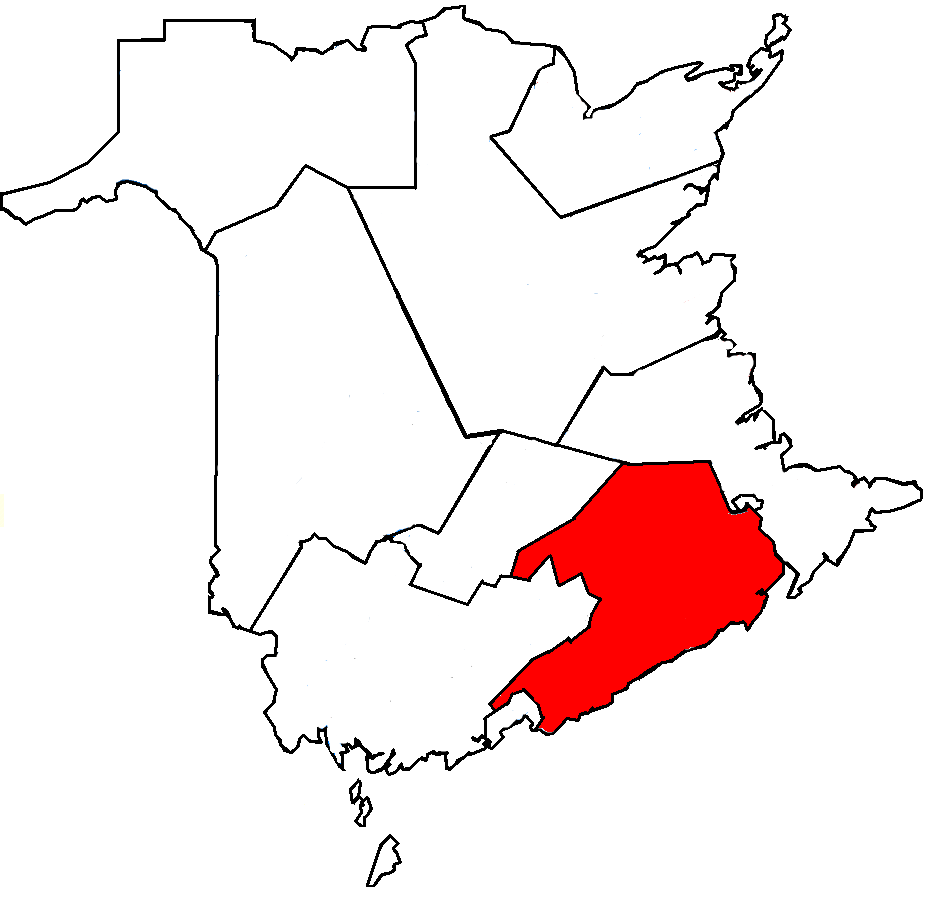
Fundy Royal Electoral District

Her political involvement began with service as a village councilor in Norton from 2004 to 2008. Lockhart was also a Director of the Royal District Planning Commission, prior to her involvement in federal politics.

=== 42nd Canadian Government ===
She was the Liberal Party's nominee in Fundy Royal in the 2015 election. As a small business owner, Lockhart's campaign appealed to working, middle-class individuals. Lockhart is encouraged by "strengthening the middle class to put more money in their pockets to then stimulate the economy".

On October 19, 2015, Lockhart defeated Rob Moore and became the MP for her riding. She is only the second non-Conservative to represent Fundy Royal in its century-long history, the first being Paul Zed, who served a single term from 1993 to 1997. Previously holding only one seat in New Brunswick, Lockhart's success was a result of a province-wide wave of liberal support, who held all ten seats for the province following the 2015 election. Lockhart also became the first female MP for the Fundy Royal riding. Whilst making history for her riding, many were critical of her candidacy during the 2015 election. Lockhart elaborated on the sexism faced from reporters in a 2019 interview with Chatelaine (magazine):

“I understand how I was a bit of a novelty being the first woman ever elected in Fundy Royal, but I am guessing no one ever asked my predecessors who would care for their children when they went to Ottawa.”

In March 2019 on International Women's Day, Lockhart participated in a roundtable hosted by the Women's Enterprise Organizations of Canada (WEOC) in Kelowna, BC. The purpose of the roundtable was to discuss the future of women entrepreneurs.

In June 2019, near the end of the 42nd Canadian Parliament, Lockhart addressed the House of Commons in saying that her experience as a member of parliament "has been a true honour and the most challenging work of my life".

==== Committees and Roles ====
During her time in parliament, Lockhart was part of many committees and had many roles as a member of parliament. She was a member of the Agriculture and Agri-Food Committee and a member of the Veterans Affairs Committee from January 2016 to September 2017. Also, Lockhart was a Parliamentary Secretary for Small Business and Tourism from September 2017 to August 2018, as well as Parliamentary Secretary of Official Languages and La Francophone from August 2018 to September 2019.

Lockhart is also a strong advocate for immigration, proposing a private motion M-39 to increase immigration to Canada, specifically to Atlantic Canada. According to Lockhart, "[w]hen Atlantic Canada does better, all of Canada does better".

=== 43rd Canadian Government ===
During the campaign, Lockhart was commended by Justin Trudeau as being a hard-working, connected member of her community with a passion for growing business and tourism.

Following her defeat in the 2019 Canadian Federal Election, Lockhart took to Twitter to congratulate Rob Moore, and thank the voting district for allowing her the opportunity to serve. Despite the defeat, Lockhart takes great pride in making history as the first woman to represent the region at the federal level.

=== Parliamentary Secretary to Small Business and Tourism ===
Lockhart was Canada's Parliamentary Secretary to Small Business and Tourism from September 2017 to September 2019. This is a subject near to Lockhart's heart, as a previous small business owner herself. Since becoming MP in 2015, Lockhart has made many contributions to Canada's small business and tourism sector.

In June 2018, Lockhart announced a federal grant of $180,000 to support business growth in rural communities.

In May 2019, Lockhart met with tourism companies to discuss growth in the Canadian tourism industry, which includes the Canadian Experiences Fund. The CEF, created in 2019, has given many communities across the country to host events and generate tourism; events, who have been possible due to the $1.7 million federal grant, include a Pride festival in Kelowna and an anti-racism conference in Hamilton. Following the creation of the 2019 Federal Tourism Growth Strategy, Lockhart has expressed her excitement in saying:

"I look forward to seeing how it will impact the province by increasing visitors, strengthening our communities and growing the economy."

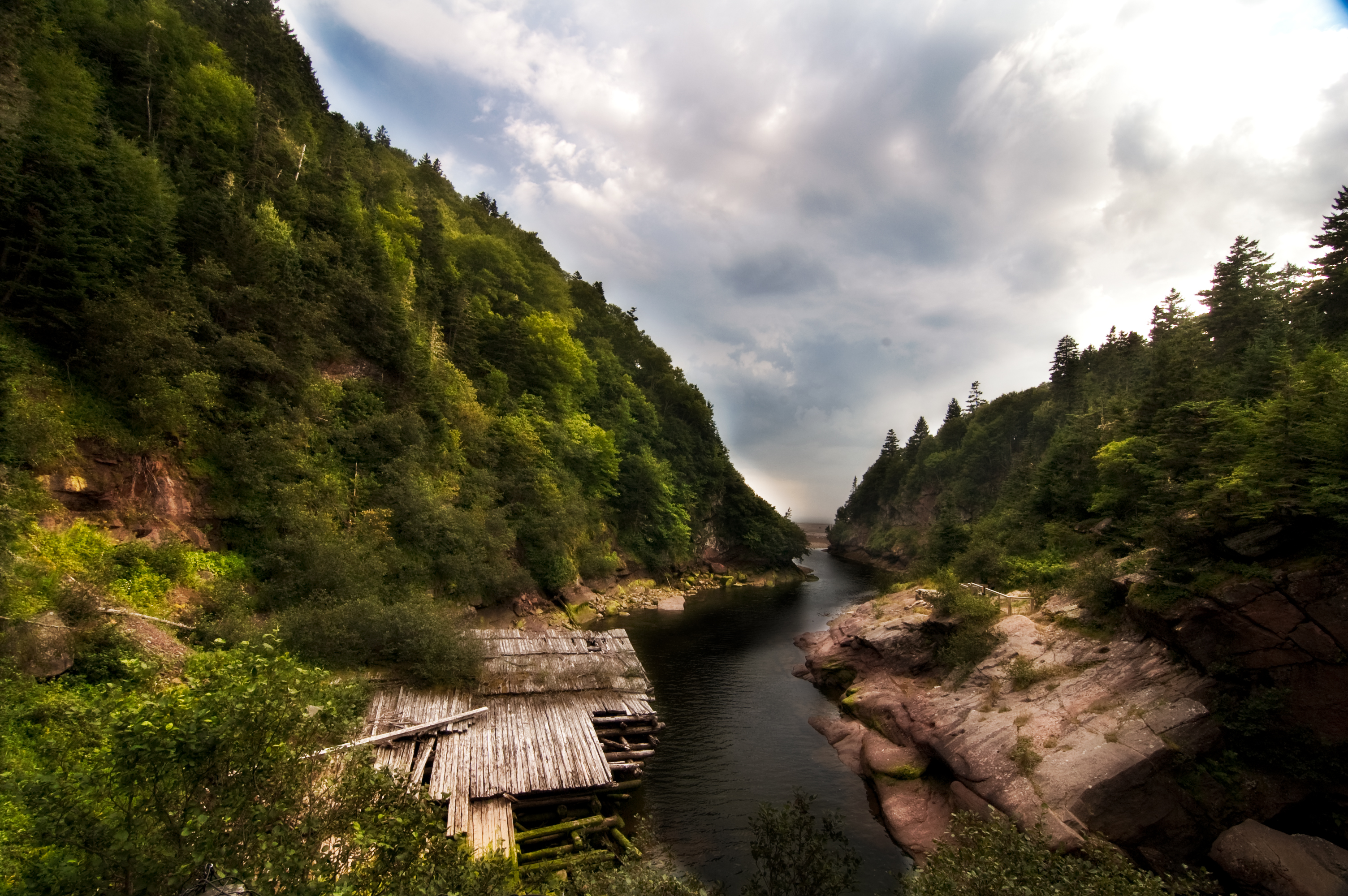
Fundy National Park, which received many upgrades due to Lockhart's work

In July 2019, Lockhart participating in the announcement to upgrade the Fundy Trail Parkway. Lockhart says the upgrade are essential to tourism in order to "make sure that people have a greater experience when they come here and not just the drive". The federal government invested $6.6 million, announced Lockhart, to upgrade many aspects of Fundy National Park, including supporting the restoration of Atlantic salmon.

== Personal life ==
Lockhart is married to her husband Rick and has a daughter, Lauren. The family currently lives in the Sussex area.

Since 2014, Lockhart is an active member of the Rotary Club of Sussex.

== Electoral record ==
2019 Canadian federal election: Fundy Royal
Party	Candidate	Votes	%	±%	Expenditures
Conservative	Rob Moore	22,389	46.02	+8.94	$75,539.19
Liberal	Alaina Lockhart	12,433	25.56	−15.31	$70,219.03
Green	Tim Thompson	7,275	14.95	+11.06	$23,925.97
New Democratic	James Tolan	4,804	9.88	−7.65	$1,955.15
People's	Rudy Neumayer	1,249	2.57		none listed
Independent	David Raymond Amos	295	0.61	−0.03	none listed
National Citizens Alliance	John Evans	201	0.41		none listed
Total valid votes/expense limit		48,646	99.29		
Total rejected ballots		349	0.71	+0.02	
Turnout		48,995	75.39	+0.79	
Eligible voters		64,992			
Conservative gain from Liberal		Swing		+12.13	
Source: Elections Canada

2015 Canadian federal election: Fundy Royal
Party	Candidate	Votes	%	±%	Expenditures
Liberal	Alaina Lockhart	19,136	40.87	+30.44	$44,760.36
Conservative	Rob Moore	17,361	37.09	−20.88	$94,342.23
New Democratic	Jennifer McKenzie	8,204	17.52	−9.34	$48,770.66
Green	Stephanie Coburn	1,823	3.89	−0.83	$1,469.99
Independent	David Raymond Amos	296	0.63	–	–
Total valid votes/expense limit		46,820	100.0		$204,844.46
Total rejected ballots		241	0.51		
Turnout		47,061	75.04		
Eligible voters		62,713			
Liberal gain from Conservative		Swing		+25.66	
Source(s): "Fundy Royal". Election Results. Elections Canada.; Elections Canada – Preliminary Election Expenses Limits for Candidates
