= Fundy Royal =

Federal electoral district in New Brunswick, Canada

New Brunswick electoral district
- Interactive map of riding boundaries from the 2025 federal election
- Coordinates: 45.789°N 65.270°W

Federal electoral district
- Legislature: House of Commons
MP
Rob Moore
Conservative
- District created: 1914
- First contested: 1917
- Last contested: 2025
- District webpage: profile, map

Demographics
- Population (2016): 79,943
- Electors (2025): 62,477
- Area (km²): 7,686
- Pop. density (per km²): 10.4
- Census division(s): Albert, Kings, Queens, Saint John, Westmorland
- Census subdivision(s): Riverview, Hampton, Maple Hills (part), Salisbury, Fundy Albert, Sussex, Fundy-St. Martins, Valley Waters (part), Three Rivers

Fundy Royal (formerly known as Royal from 1914 to 1966, Fundy—Royal from 1966 to 2003, and Fundy in 2003–2004) is a federal electoral district in southern New Brunswick, Canada, that has been represented in the House of Commons of Canada since 1917.

The riding roughly covers the area in between the three largest cities in the province; Fredericton, Saint John and Moncton. Included in the riding are the towns of Quispamsis, Hampton, Sussex, Fundy-St. Martins, Three Rivers, Salisbury and part of Riverview. Also included are the area around Loch Lomond east of Saint John, and the Kingston Peninsula.

The neighbouring ridings are Saint John—Kennebecasis, New Brunswick Southwest, Miramichi—Grand Lake, Beauséjour, Moncton—Dieppe (in New Brunswick), and Cumberland—Colchester (in Nova Scotia).

== History ==
The riding of "Royal" was created in 1914. The name came from the counties of Queens and Kings, of which it was composed.

In 1966, Royal riding was amalgamated with most of Albert County and a rural portion of Saint John County into a new riding, "Fundy—Royal". One parish in Queens county was reapportioned into York—Sunbury at this time. In the 2003 redistribution, it lost almost all of Queens County and a large part of Kings County to other ridings; while gaining western Westmorland County. The riding was renamed "Fundy". This name was changed to "Fundy Royal" in 2004. As per the 2012 federal electoral redistribution, this riding will gain territories from Beauséjour, Saint John and New Brunswick Southwest, and lose a small territory to the new riding of Saint John—Rothesay.

The riding has been one of the most supportive of the Conservatives in the country, returning a member of that party or its predecessors in every election, except for the 1993 election when Liberal Paul Zed won and the 2015 election when Liberal Alaina Lockhart won.

Following the 2022 Canadian federal electoral redistribution, the riding united Town of Riverview into the riding, taking parts from Moncton—Riverview—Dieppe, while losing Waterborough to Miramichi—Grand Lake and Quispamsis to Saint John—Kennebecasis.

Historical population
Year	Pop.	±%
2001	67,675	—
2006	69,471	+2.7%
2011	73,484	+5.8%

== Demographics ==
According to the 2021 Canadian census; 2023 representation

Racial groups: 94.6% White, 2.3% Indigenous
Languages: 93.0% English, 5.9% French
Religions: 61.4% Christian (18.7% Catholic, 13.3% Baptist, 7.8% Anglican, 7.2% United Church, 1.9% Pentecostal, 1.1% Methodist, 11.4% Other), 37.4% No religion
Median income (2020): $38,800
Average income (2020): $45,800

== Riding associations ==
Riding associations are the local branches of the national political parties:

Party	Association name	CEO	HQ city
Conservative Party of Canada	Fundy Royal Conservative Association	Rodney Weston	Fundy-St. Martins
Green Party of Canada	Fundy Royal Green Party Association	Ryan James Alexander Carr	Saint John
Liberal Party of Canada	Fundy Royal Federal Liberal Association	John Kelley	Quispamsis
New Democratic Party	Fundy Royal Federal NDP Riding Association	Josh Floyd	Saint John

== Members of Parliament ==
This riding has elected the following members of Parliament:

Parliament	Years	Member	Party
Royal
13th	1917–1921	Hugh Havelock McLean	Government (Unionist)
14th	1921–1925	George Burpee Jones	Conservative
15th	1925–1926	George Burpee Jones	Conservative
16th	1926–1930	George Burpee Jones	Conservative
17th	1930–1935	George Burpee Jones	Conservative
18th	1935–1940	Alfred Johnson Brooks	Conservative
19th	1940–1945	Alfred Johnson Brooks	National Government
20th	1945–1949	Alfred Johnson Brooks	Progressive Conservative
21st	1949–1953	Alfred Johnson Brooks	Progressive Conservative
22nd	1953–1957	Alfred Johnson Brooks	Progressive Conservative
23rd	1957–1958	Alfred Johnson Brooks	Progressive Conservative
24th	1958–1960	Alfred Johnson Brooks	Progressive Conservative
24th	1960–1962	Hugh John Flemming	Progressive Conservative
25th	1962–1963	Gordon Fairweather	Progressive Conservative
26th	1963–1965	Gordon Fairweather	Progressive Conservative
27th	1965–1968	Gordon Fairweather	Progressive Conservative
Fundy—Royal
28th	1968–1972	Gordon Fairweather	Progressive Conservative
29th	1972–1974	Gordon Fairweather	Progressive Conservative
30th	1974–1977	Gordon Fairweather	Progressive Conservative
30th	1978–1979	Robert Corbett	Progressive Conservative
31st	1979–1980	Robert Corbett	Progressive Conservative
32nd	1980–1984	Robert Corbett	Progressive Conservative
33rd	1984–1988	Robert Corbett	Progressive Conservative
34th	1988–1993	Robert Corbett	Progressive Conservative
35th	1993–1997	Paul Zed	Liberal
36th	1997–2000	John Herron	Progressive Conservative
37th	2000–2003	John Herron	Progressive Conservative
37th	2003–2004	John Herron	Independent Progressive Conservative
Fundy Royal
38th	2004–2006	Rob Moore	Conservative
39th	2006–2008	Rob Moore	Conservative
40th	2008–2011	Rob Moore	Conservative
41st	2011–2015	Rob Moore	Conservative
42nd	2015–2019	Alaina Lockhart	Liberal
43rd	2019–2021	Rob Moore	Conservative
44th	2021–2025	Rob Moore	Conservative
45th	2025–present	Rob Moore	Conservative

== Election results ==
=== Fundy Royal ===
2025 Canadian federal election
Party	Candidate	Votes	%	±%	Expenditures
Conservative	Rob Moore	25,411	53.37	+7.04	$112,001.61
Liberal	Bill Kudla	19,103	40.12	+14.54	$28,689.51
New Democratic	Cindy Andrie	1,507	3.17	-11.34	$0.00
Green	Hans Johnsen	961	2.02	-2.98	$0.00
People's	Alastair MacFarlane	629	1.32	-7.26	$2,427.29
Total valid votes		47,611	99.51	+0.02	$123,339.00
Total rejected ballots		234	0.49	-0.02	
Turnout		47,845	76.23	+10.26	
Eligible voters		62,763			
Conservative notional hold		Swing		-3.75	
Source: Elections Canada
Note: number of eligible voters does not include voting day registrations.

2021 federal election redistributed results
Party	Vote	%
Conservative	18,120	46.33
Liberal	10,008	25.59
New Democratic	5,672	14.50
People's	3,357	8.58
Green	1,956	5.01
Total valid votes	39,113	99.49
Rejected ballots	201	0.51
Registered voters/ estimated turnout	59,594	65.97

2021 Canadian federal election
Party	Candidate	Votes	%	±%	Expenditures
Conservative	Rob Moore	21,460	48.35	+2.33	$75,724.15
Liberal	Whitney Dykeman	11,075	24.95	–0.61	$42,961.74
New Democratic	Josh Floyd	6,211	13.99	+4.11	$150.00
People's	Wayne Wheeler	3,447	7.77	+5.20	none listed
Green	Tim Thompson	2,189	4.93	–10.02	$2,330.78
Total valid votes/expense limit		44,382	100.00	–	$108,919.19
Total rejected ballots		213	0.48	–0.23	
Turnout		44,595	66.72	–8.67	
Registered voters		66,835			
Conservative hold		Swing		+1.47	
Source: Elections Canada

2019 Canadian federal election
Party	Candidate	Votes	%	±%	Expenditures
Conservative	Rob Moore	22,389	46.02	+8.94	$75,539.19
Liberal	Alaina Lockhart	12,433	25.56	−15.31	$70,219.03
Green	Tim Thompson	7,275	14.95	+11.06	$23,925.97
New Democratic	James Tolan	4,804	9.88	−7.65	$1,955.15
People's	Rudy Neumayer	1,249	2.57		none listed
Independent	David Raymond Amos	295	0.61	−0.03	none listed
National Citizens Alliance	John Evans	201	0.41		none listed
Total valid votes/expense limit		48,646	99.29		
Total rejected ballots		349	0.71	+0.02	
Turnout		48,995	75.39	+0.79	
Eligible voters		64,992			
Conservative gain from Liberal		Swing		+12.13	
Source: Elections Canada

2015 Canadian federal election
Party	Candidate	Votes	%	±%	Expenditures
Liberal	Alaina Lockhart	19,136	40.87	+30.44	$44,760.36
Conservative	Rob Moore	17,361	37.09	−20.88	$94,342.23
New Democratic	Jennifer McKenzie	8,204	17.52	−9.34	$48,770.66
Green	Stephanie Coburn	1,823	3.89	−0.83	$1,469.99
Independent	David Raymond Amos	296	0.63	–	–
Total valid votes/expense limit		46,820	100.0		$204,844.46
Total rejected ballots		241	0.51		
Turnout		47,061	75.04		
Eligible voters		62,713			
Liberal gain from Conservative		Swing		+25.66	
Source(s): "Fundy Royal". Election Results. Elections Canada.; Elections Canada – Preliminary Election Expenses Limits for Candidates

This riding gained territory from Beauséjour, Saint John and New Brunswick Southwest, and lost a small amount of territory to Saint John—Rothesay.

2011 federal election redistributed results
Party	Vote	%
Conservative	22,821	57.96
New Democratic	10,578	26.87
Liberal	4,109	10.44
Green	1,859	4.72
Others	7	0.02

2011 Canadian federal election
Party	Candidate	Votes	%	±%	Expenditures
Conservative	Rob Moore	21,206	58.14	+6.51	$69,107.44
New Democratic	Darryl Pitre	9,845	26.99	+3.26	$16,490.62
Liberal	Linda Wilhelm	3,668	10.06	−7.26	$18,468.64
Green	Stephanie Coburn	1,757	4.82	−2.50	$4,477.15
Total valid votes/expense limit		36,476	100.0		$82,316.67
Total rejected, unmarked and declined ballots		238	0.65	−0.04	
Turnout		36,714	64.64	+3.55	
Eligible voters		56,795			
Conservative hold		Swing		+1.62	

2008 Canadian federal election
Party	Candidate	Votes	%	±%	Expenditures
Conservative	Rob Moore	17,220	51.63	+3.29	$68,450.59
New Democratic	Rob Moir	7,913	23.73	+2.61	$16,245.21
Liberal	Mark Wright	5,776	17.32	−10.04	$15,561.21
Green	Erik Millett	2,443	7.32	+4.04	$67.47
Total valid votes/expense limit		33,352	100.0		$79,136
Total rejected, unmarked and declined ballots		233	0.69	±0	
Turnout		33,585	61.09	−6.77	
Eligible voters		54,978			
Conservative hold		Swing		+0.34	

2006 Canadian federal election
Party	Candidate	Votes	%	±%	Expenditures
Conservative	Rob Moore	17,630	48.31	+3.49	$64,924.34
Liberal	Eldon Hunter	9,979	27.34	−7.43	$32,794.75
New Democratic	Rob Moir	7,696	21.09	+4.90	$8,504.17
Green	Patty Donovan	1,189	3.26	+0.12	$48.65
Total valid votes/expense limit		36,494	100.0		$73,430
Total rejected, unmarked and declined ballots		253	0.69	±0	
Turnout		36,747	67.86	+5.30	
Eligible voters		54,154			
Conservative hold		Swing		+5.46	

=== Fundy ===
2004 Canadian federal election
Party	Candidate	Votes	%	±%	Expenditures
Conservative	Rob Moore	14,997	44.82	−18.46	$63,125.86
Liberal	John Herron	11,635	34.77	+5.30	$52,913.85
New Democratic	Pat Hanratty	5,417	16.19	+8.99	$2,925.27
Green	Karin Bach	1,051	3.14	–	none listed
Independent	David Amos	358	1.07	–	none listed
Total valid votes/expense limit		33,458	100.0		$71,567
Total rejected, unmarked and declined ballots		231	0.69		
Turnout		33,689	62.56		
Eligible voters		54,113			
Conservative notional gain from Progressive Conservative		Swing		−11.88	
Changes from 2000 are based on redistributed results. Conservative Party change is based on the combination of Canadian Alliance and Progressive Conservative Party totals.

2000 federal election redistributed results
Party	Vote	%
Progressive Conservative	12,380	37.62
Liberal	9,698	29.47
Alliance	8,444	25.66
New Democratic	2,370	7.20
Others	19	0.06

=== Fundy—Royal ===
2000 Canadian federal election
Party	Candidate	Votes	%	±%
Progressive Conservative	John Herron	15,279	40.51	−1.01
Liberal	John King	11,422	30.28	+4.96
Alliance	Rob Moore	8,392	22.25	−0.68
New Democratic	John Calder	2,628	6.97	−2.44
Total valid votes		37,721	100.00	

Results for the Canadian Alliance from 1997 are based on the results of its predecessor, the Reform Party.

1997 Canadian federal election
Party	Candidate	Votes	%	±%
Progressive Conservative	John Herron	16,715	41.52	+13.11
Liberal	Paul Zed	10,192	25.32	−21.05
Reform	Roger Brown	9,229	22.93	+5.20
New Democratic	Larry Washburn	3,790	9.41	+4.61
Natural Law	Janice Sharon MacMillan	329	0.82	
Total valid votes		40,255	100.00	

1993 Canadian federal election
Party	Candidate	Votes	%	±%
Liberal	Paul Zed	21,677	46.37	+10.10
Progressive Conservative	Robert Corbett	13,282	28.41	−18.29
Reform	Dan McKiel	8,288	17.73	
New Democratic	Mark Connell	2,244	4.80	−6.17
Independent	Colby Fraser	1,258	2.69	−3.37
Total valid votes		46,749	100.00	

Independent candidate Colby Fraser's change is based on his 1988 result running as a Confederation of Regions candidate.

1988 Canadian federal election
Party	Candidate	Votes	%	±%
Progressive Conservative	Robert Corbett	21,129	46.70	−9.88
Liberal	Eldon Hunter	16,411	36.27	+11.30
New Democratic	Rosemarie McNairn	4,965	10.97	−7.48
Confederation of Regions	Colby Fraser	2742	6.06	
Total valid votes		45,247	100.00	

1984 Canadian federal election
Party	Candidate	Votes	%	±%
Progressive Conservative	Robert Corbett	26,021	56.58	+15.74
Liberal	Donna Spalding	11,482	24.97	−11.96
New Democratic	Kay Bedell	8,487	18.45	−2.61
Total valid votes		45,990	100.00	

1980 Canadian federal election
Party	Candidate	Votes	%	±%
Progressive Conservative	Robert Corbett	16,805	40.84	−6.44
Liberal	Joseph A. Day	15,197	36.93	+3.35
New Democratic	George Little	8,668	21.06	+1.92
Independent	Albert Brown	335	0.81	
Independent	Kevin Murphy	145	0.35	
Total valid votes		41,150	100.00	
Source: Canadian Elections Database

1979 Canadian federal election
Party	Candidate	Votes	%	±%
Progressive Conservative	Robert Corbett	19,135	47.28	−5.22
Liberal	Joseph A. Day	13,589	33.58	−3.51
New Democratic	Bruce E. Halpin	7,746	19.14	+8.73
Total valid votes		40,470	100.00	

Canadian federal by-election, 16 October 1978
Party	Candidate	Votes	%	±%
On Gordon Fairweather's resignation, 1 September 1977
Progressive Conservative	Robert Corbett	17,327	52.50	+9.15
Liberal	Joseph A. Day	12,241	37.09	+2.60
New Democratic	Bruce E. Halpin	3,434	10.41	−3.38
Total valid votes		33,002	100.00	

1974 Canadian federal election
Party	Candidate	Votes	%	±%
Progressive Conservative	Gordon Fairweather	13,631	43.35	-17.17
Liberal	Gordon L. Phippen	10,845	34.49	+4.90
New Democratic	Bruce E. Halpin	4,337	13.79	+6.87
Independent	Albert James Brown	2,628	8.36	
Total valid votes		31,441	100.00	

=== Royal ===
1972 Canadian federal election
Party	Candidate	Votes	%	±%
Progressive Conservative	Gordon Fairweather	19,107	60.52	−0.76
Liberal	Gordon L. Phippen	9,343	29.59	−4.39
New Democratic	Bruce E. Halpin	2,186	6.92	+2.18
Social Credit	Ernest Gowlett	937	2.97	
Total valid votes		31,573	100.00	

1968 Canadian federal election
Party	Candidate	Votes	%	±%
Progressive Conservative	Gordon Fairweather	17,013	61.28	+5.88
Liberal	A.J. Callaghan	9,435	33.98	−3.19
New Democratic	Hendrien Kippers	1,316	4.74	−2.69
Total valid votes		27,764	100.00	

1965 Canadian federal election
Party	Candidate	Votes	%	±%
Progressive Conservative	Gordon Fairweather	9,865	55.40	+1.90
Liberal	Dorothy Dearborn	6,619	37.17	−3.91
New Democratic	Russell Bond	1,324	7.43	+5.04
Total valid votes		17,808	100.00	

1963 Canadian federal election
Party	Candidate	Votes	%	±%
Progressive Conservative	Gordon Fairweather	9,524	53.50	+0.46
Liberal	Dorothy Dearborn	7,314	41.08	+0.97
Social Credit	John Stephen	539	3.03	+0.30
New Democratic	Russell Bond	426	2.39	−1.73
Total valid votes		17,803	100.00	

1962 Canadian federal election
Party	Candidate	Votes	%	±%
Progressive Conservative	Gordon Fairweather	9,805	53.04	+1.13
Liberal	Harold Fredericks	7,414	40.11	−5.73
New Democratic	Hazen Wiggins	762	4.12	+1.87
Social Credit	Robert Reed	504	2.73	
Total valid votes		18,485	100.00	

Change for the New Democratic Party is based on the results from the Co-operative Commonwealth Federation in the 1960 by-election.

By-election on 31 October 1960
Party	Candidate	Votes	%	±%
Progressive Conservative	Hugh John Flemming	8,755	51.91	−7.94
Liberal	Harold Fredericks	7,731	45.84	+5.69
Co-operative Commonwealth	George Henry Wheaton	379	2.25	
Total valid votes		16,865	100.00	

1958 Canadian federal election
Party	Candidate	Votes	%	±%
Progressive Conservative	Alfred Johnson Brooks	10,483	59.85	+0.82
Liberal	Clifford O'Neil	7,031	40.15	−0.82
Total valid votes		17,514	100.00	

1957 Canadian federal election
Party	Candidate	Votes	%	±%
Progressive Conservative	Alfred Johnson Brooks	10,051	59.03	+4.06
Liberal	Miles Jenkins	6,977	40.97	−4.06
Total valid votes		17,028	100.00	

1953 Canadian federal election
Party	Candidate	Votes	%	±%
Progressive Conservative	Alfred Johnson Brooks	9,725	54.97	+3.04
Liberal	Harold Perkins	7,968	45.03	+2.06
Total valid votes		17,693	100.00	

1949 Canadian federal election
Party	Candidate	Votes	%	±%
Progressive Conservative	Alfred Johnson Brooks	9,501	51.93	−1.08
Liberal	Harold Perkins	7,863	42.97	+2.72
Co-operative Commonwealth	Hazen Wiggins	933	5.10	−1.64
Total valid votes		18,297	100.00	

1945 Canadian federal election
Party	Candidate	Votes	%	±%
Progressive Conservative	Alfred Johnson Brooks	8,915	53.01	+0.31
Liberal	Albert William Clark	6,769	40.25	−7.05
Co-operative Commonwealth	Frank Coates	1,134	6.74	
Total valid votes		16,818	100.00	

1940 Canadian federal election
Party	Candidate	Votes	%	±%
Conservative	Alfred Johnson Brooks	8017	52.70	+4.95
Liberal	Donald V. White	7,196	47.30	+0.48
Total valid votes		15,213	100.00	

1935 Canadian federal election
Party	Candidate	Votes	%	±%
Conservative	Alfred Johnson Brooks	7,474	47.75	−4.18
Liberal	Donald V. White	7,329	46.82	−1.25
Reconstruction	James McCrea	849	5.42	Ø
Total valid votes		15,652	100.00	

By-election on 27 June 1932
Party	Candidate	Votes	%	±%
Conservative	George Burpee Jones	7,698	51.93	−5.21
Liberal	Donald V. White	7,127	48.07	+5.21
Total valid votes		14,825	100.00	

1930 Canadian federal election
Party	Candidate	Votes	%	±%
Conservative	George Burpee Jones	7,698	57.14	+1.52
Liberal	Donald V. White	5,774	42.86	−1.52
Total valid votes		13,472	100.00	
Source: lop.parl.ca

1926 Canadian federal election
Party	Candidate	Votes	%	±%
Conservative	George Burpee Jones	7,485	55.62	−1.52
Liberal	Duncan McAlister	5,973	44.38	+1.52
Total valid votes		13,458	100.00	

1925 Canadian federal election
Party	Candidate	Votes	%	±%
Conservative	George Burpee Jones	7,485	57.14	+16.47
Liberal	Duncan McAlister	5,614	42.86	+3.04
Total valid votes		13,099	100.00	

1921 Canadian federal election
Party	Candidate	Votes	%	±%
Conservative	George Burpee Jones	5,551	40.67	−27.10
Liberal	Duncan McAlister	5,434	39.82	+7.59
Independent	Harold Perkins	2,663	19.51	
Total valid votes		13,648	100.00	

1917 Canadian federal election
Party	Candidate	Votes	%
Government (Unionist)	Hugh Havelock McLean	5,959	67.77
Opposition (Laurier Liberals)	Fred Ernest Sharp	2,834	32.23
Total valid votes		8,793	100.00

== See also ==
- List of Canadian electoral districts
- Historical federal electoral districts of Canada
