= Robert Corbett (Canadian politician) =

Canadian politician (1938–2025)

The Honourable Robert Alfred Corbett BBA

Member of Parliament for Fundy Royal
- In office 1978–1993
- Preceded by: Gordon Fairweather
- Succeeded by: Paul Zed

Personal details
- Born: December 14, 1938 Saint John, New Brunswick, Canada
- Died: April 6, 2025 (aged 86) Fredericton, New Brunswick, Canada
- Party: Progressive Conservative
- Spouse: Janet
- Profession: Businessman

Robert Alfred Corbett (December 14, 1938 – April 6, 2025) was a Canadian businessman and politician who was a member of the House of Commons of Canada from 1978 to 1993.

== Early life ==
Corbett was born in Saint John, New Brunswick, was the son of James Ross Corbett and Helen Elma Yeamans. In 1971, he married Laverne Dorothea Stewart. Corbett represented Queens South in the Legislative Assembly of New Brunswick from 1974 to 1978.

== Federal career ==
Corbett was first elected to the House of Commons in a by-election on 16 October 1978 at the Fundy—Royal electoral district for the Progressive Conservative party. He served consecutive terms in the 30th, 31st, 32nd, 33rd and 34th Canadian Parliaments until his defeat in the 1993 federal election at the hands of the Liberal Party's Paul Zed. Corbett additionally sought to represent the Progressive Conservatives in the riding of Charlotte for the 1997 federal election, though he lost to Greg Thompson when a vote was held in December 1996.

=== Israel-Palestine ===
Throughout his career, Corbett was an outspoken supporter of Palestine and condemned Israeli occupation in the Arab territories. In June 1982, he gave a speech to the graduating class of Caledonia Regional High School in which he shared about the destruction he witnessed in a recent visit to Lebanon during hostilities with Israel. Corbett also recalled witnessing soldiers blockading a school in the West Bank. Corbett served as chairman of the Canada-Arab World Parliament and in early 1983 addressed the Palestinian National Council during a session in Algiers, in which himself, along with Quebec MP Marcel Prud'homme, were pictured raising hands with Yasser Arafat. He was criticized by a number of Tory allies for the incident, but also received praise from well-known poet Alden Nowlan, who expressed that he agreed with Corbett that Palestinians deserved their right to a homeland. In early 1984, Corbett and six other MPs were criticized by the Canada-Israel Committee after they had recently met with Arafat. Corbett afterwards stated that the purpose of the meeting was to convince the Palestine Liberation Organization to recognize the State of Israel's right to exist. Corbett, a promoter of Canada-Arab relations, attended a meeting in Montreal in 1985, during which he stated "I'm a Canadian by birth, an Irishman by heritage and a Palestinian by choice." The meeting was held to discuss the treatment of Iraqi prisoners of the Iran–Iraq War. In February 1988, Corbett toured the Jabalia refugee camp in the Gaza Strip along with three other MPs and two Senators, later recounting that "as a human being I was very disturbed" and further stated that "apparently there has been a systematic policy by the Israeli army to inflict the greatest amount of damage possible".

== Death ==
Corbett died in Fredericton on April 6, 2025, at the age of 86.

== Electoral history ==
1993 Canadian federal election: Fundy Royal
Party	Candidate	Votes	%	±%
Liberal	Paul Zed	21,677	46.37	+10.10
Progressive Conservative	Robert Corbett	13,282	28.41	−18.29
Reform	Dan McKiel	8,288	17.73	
New Democratic	Mark Connell	2,244	4.80	−6.17
Independent	Colby Fraser	1,258	2.69	−3.37
Total valid votes		46,749	100.00	

Independent candidate Colby Fraser's change is based on his 1988 result running as a Confederation of Regions candidate.

1988 Canadian federal election: Fundy Royal
Party	Candidate	Votes	%	±%
Progressive Conservative	Robert Corbett	21,129	46.70	−9.88
Liberal	Eldon Hunter	16,411	36.27	+11.30
New Democratic	Rosemarie McNairn	4,965	10.97	−7.48
Confederation of Regions	Colby Fraser	2742	6.06	
Total valid votes		45,247	100.00	

1984 Canadian federal election: Fundy Royal
Party	Candidate	Votes	%	±%
Progressive Conservative	Robert Corbett	26,021	56.58	+15.74
Liberal	Donna Spalding	11,482	24.97	−11.96
New Democratic	Kay Bedell	8,487	18.45	−2.61
Total valid votes		45,990	100.00	

1980 Canadian federal election: Fundy Royal
Party	Candidate	Votes	%	±%
Progressive Conservative	Robert Corbett	16,805	40.84	−6.44
Liberal	Joseph A. Day	15,197	36.93	+3.35
New Democratic	George Little	8,668	21.06	+1.92
Independent	Albert Brown	335	0.81	
Independent	Kevin Murphy	145	0.35	
Total valid votes		41,150	100.00	
Source: Canadian Elections Database

1979 Canadian federal election: Fundy Royal
Party	Candidate	Votes	%	±%
Progressive Conservative	Robert Corbett	19,135	47.28	−5.22
Liberal	Joseph A. Day	13,589	33.58	−3.51
New Democratic	Bruce E. Halpin	7,746	19.14	+8.73
Total valid votes		40,470	100.00	

Canadian federal by-election, 16 October 1978: Fundy Royal
Party	Candidate	Votes	%	±%
On Gordon Fairweather's resignation, 1 September 1977
Progressive Conservative	Robert Corbett	17,327	52.50	+9.15
Liberal	Joseph A. Day	12,241	37.09	+2.60
New Democratic	Bruce E. Halpin	3,434	10.41	-3.38
Total valid votes		33,002	100.00	

Parliament of Canada
Preceded by Gordon Fairweather	Member of Parliament for Fundy; 1978–1993	Succeeded by Paul Zed
