= Gordon Fairweather =

Canadian politician (1923–2008)

Robert Gordon Lee Fairweather OC ONB QC
- Official 1974 portrait

Member of the Canadian Parliament for Royal
- In office 1962–1968
- Preceded by: Hugh John Flemming
- Succeeded by: The electoral district was abolished in 1966.

Member of the Canadian Parliament for Fundy—Royal
- In office 1968–1977
- Preceded by: The electoral district was created in 1966.
- Succeeded by: Robert Corbett

Member of the Legislative Assembly of New Brunswick for King's
- In office 1952–1962

Personal details
- Born: 27 March 1923 Rothesay, New Brunswick
- Died: 24 December 2008 (aged 85) Saint John, New Brunswick
- Party: Progressive Conservative
- Other political affiliations: Progressive Conservative Party of New Brunswick
- Spouse: Nancy Elizabeth Broughall
- Relations: Jack Fairweather, father Elsie Wayne, cousin
- Education: Rothesay Collegiate; University of New Brunswick; Osgoode Hall Law School
- Occupation: Lawyer, politician
- Cabinet: Provincial: Attorney General (1958–1960)

Robert Gordon Lee Fairweather OC ONB QC (27 March 1923 – 24 December 2008) was a lawyer and Canadian politician.

Fairweather was born in Rothesay, New Brunswick, the son of J.H.A.L. Fairweather and Agnes C. McKeen. Fairweather was educated at Rothesay Collegiate. He served in the Royal Canadian Naval Volunteer Reserve during World War II from 1941 to 1945, retiring with the rank of lieutenant commander. He then obtained a Bachelor of Civil Law degree from the University of New Brunswick in 1949 and went on to earn his doctorate at Osgoode Hall. He was called to the bar in 1949 and entered the practice of law in Saint John. In 1958, he was named Queen's Counsel.

In 1946, he married Nancy Elizabeth Broughall. They had two sons, Michael and Hugh, and a daughter, Wendy.

From 1952 to 1962, he represented King's County in the Legislative Assembly of New Brunswick and from 1958 to 1960 he was the Attorney General.

In 1962, he was elected to the House of Commons of Canada as a Progressive Conservative candidate for the New Brunswick riding of Royal. He was re-elected in 1963, 1965, 1968, 1972, and 1974.

From 1977 to 1987, he was appointed the first chief commissioner of the Canadian Human Rights Commission. From 1989 to 1992, he was founding chairman of the Immigration and Refugee Board of Canada.

He was an official observer of elections in Zimbabwe, El Salvador, Guatemala, and Malaysia and headed the Canadian delegation at the U.N. Commission on Human Rights in Geneva on three occasions. He received honorary doctoral degrees from several universities, the Outstanding Achievement Award of the Public Service in 1990, the 1997 Tarnopolsky Award for fostering human rights, the 1999 Canadian Red Cross (New Brunswick Branch) Humanitarian of the Year Award, and the 2002 New Brunswick Pioneer of Human Rights Award.

In 1978, he was made an Officer of the Order of Canada "for notable services to his country". In 2005, he was awarded the Order of New Brunswick.

His cousin Elsie Wayne was also a member of the House of Commons and served as acting leader of the federal Progressive Conservative Party during 1998.

A well-known Red Tory, Fairweather supported abortion rights, bilingualism, the abolition of capital punishment, same-sex marriage, and was one of twelve Progressive Conservative members in Parliament to vote in favor of Bill C-150, a bill that decriminalized homossexuality. In June 1977 an amendment put forward by Gordon Fairweather to add sexual orientation to the Canadian Human Rights Act was defeated in committee: only Fairweather and Stuart Leggatt (NDP, who had introduced a similar amendment) voted in favour. When the Canadian Charter of Rights and Freedoms was being drafted, he urged addition to the Charter of protections based on physical handicap, marital status, and sexual orientation.

In the 2004 election campaign, after the merger of the PC Party with the Canadian Alliance, he admitted he was struggling with the new party's social conservatism. "I'm a Red Tory and I'm anxious to see that the party is broadly based. The centre is where anyone who expects to form a government should be," said Fairweather. "I don't like seeing issues that have been long settled by the Supreme Court or the Constitution or time, being hauled out of the barn."

Fairweather died on 24 December 2008, at the age of 85.

== Archives ==
There is a Gordon Fairweather fonds at Library and Archives Canada.

== Electoral history ==
1974 Canadian federal election: Fundy Royal
Party	Candidate	Votes	%	±%
Progressive Conservative	Gordon Fairweather	13,631	43.35	-17.17
Liberal	Gordon L. Phippen	10,845	34.49	+4.90
New Democratic	Bruce E. Halpin	4,337	13.79	+6.87
Independent	Albert James Brown	2,628	8.36	
Total valid votes		31,441	100.00	

1972 Canadian federal election: Fundy Royal
Party	Candidate	Votes	%	±%
Progressive Conservative	Gordon Fairweather	19,107	60.52	−0.76
Liberal	Gordon L. Phippen	9,343	29.59	−4.39
New Democratic	Bruce E. Halpin	2,186	6.92	+2.18
Social Credit	Ernest Gowlett	937	2.97	
Total valid votes		31,573	100.00	

1968 Canadian federal election: Fundy Royal
Party	Candidate	Votes	%	±%
Progressive Conservative	Gordon Fairweather	17,013	61.28	+5.88
Liberal	A.J. Callaghan	9,435	33.98	−3.19
New Democratic	Hendrien Kippers	1,316	4.74	−2.69
Total valid votes		27,764	100.00	

1965 Canadian federal election: Fundy Royal
Party	Candidate	Votes	%	±%
Progressive Conservative	Gordon Fairweather	9,865	55.40	+1.90
Liberal	Dorothy Dearborn	6,619	37.17	−3.91
New Democratic	Russell Bond	1,324	7.43	+5.04
Total valid votes		17,808	100.00	

1963 Canadian federal election: Fundy Royal
Party	Candidate	Votes	%	±%
Progressive Conservative	Gordon Fairweather	9,524	53.50	+0.46
Liberal	Dorothy Dearborn	7,314	41.08	+0.97
Social Credit	John Stephen	539	3.03	+0.30
New Democratic	Russell Bond	426	2.39	−1.73
Total valid votes		17,803	100.00	

1962 Canadian federal election: Fundy Royal
Party	Candidate	Votes	%	±%
Progressive Conservative	Gordon Fairweather	9,805	53.04	+1.13
Liberal	Harold Fredericks	7,414	40.11	−5.73
New Democratic	Hazen Wiggins	762	4.12	+1.87
Social Credit	Robert Reed	504	2.73	
Total valid votes		18,485	100.00	

Change for the New Democratic Party is based on the results from the Co-operative Commonwealth Federation in the 1960 by-election.
