= Gary Crossman =

Canadian politician

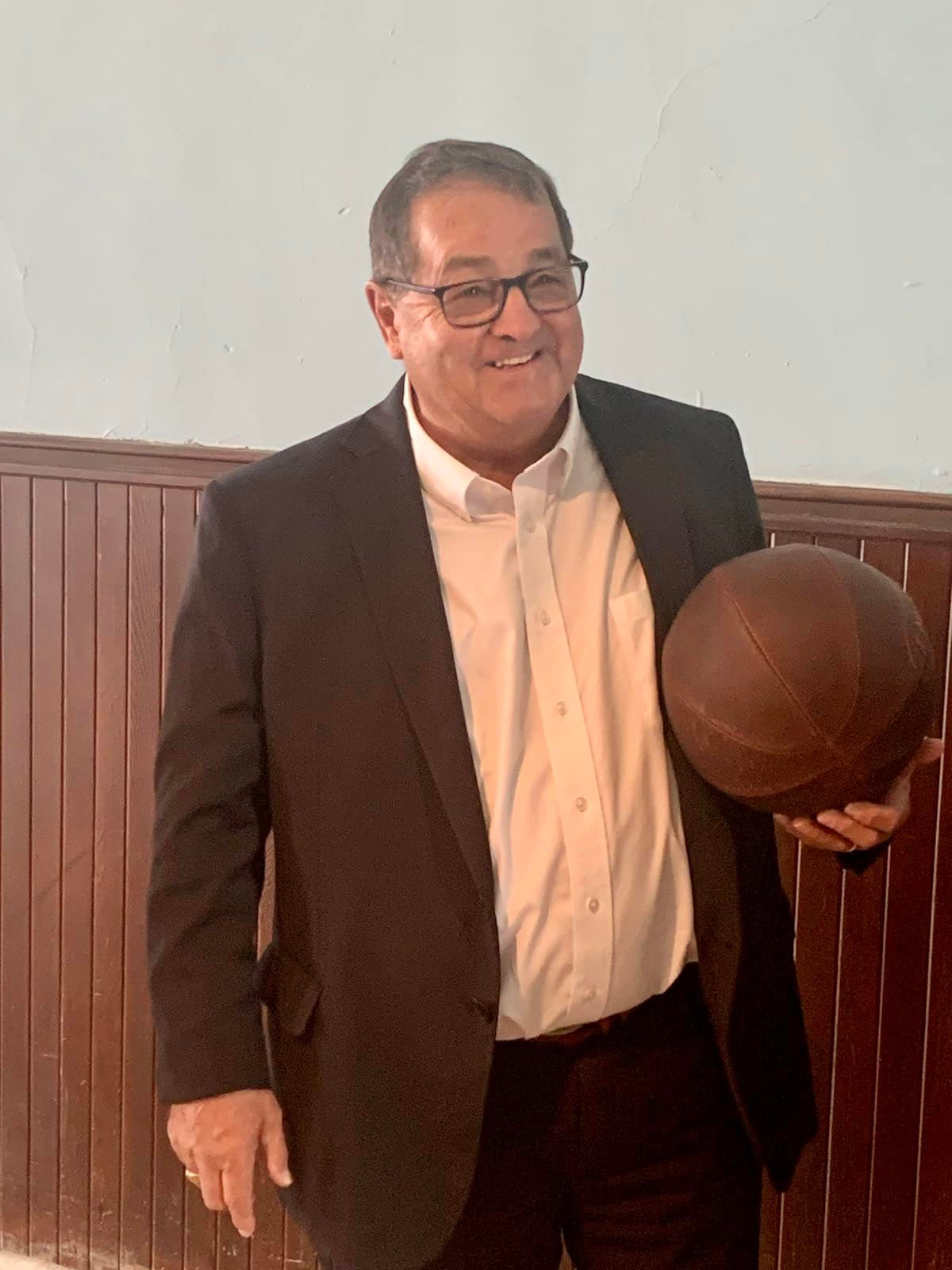

Minister of Environment and Climate Change
- In office September 29, 2020 – April 19, 2024
- Premier: Blaine Higgs
- Preceded by: Jeff Carr (Environment and Local Government)

Member of the New Brunswick Legislative Assembly for Hampton
- In office September 22, 2014 – April 30, 2024
- Preceded by: Bev Harrison
- Succeeded by: John Herron

Personal details
- Born: 10 March 1955 (age 71) Sussex, New Brunswick
- Party: Progressive Conservative

Gary Edward Crossman (born 10 March 1955 in Sussex, New Brunswick) is a Canadian politician, who was elected to the Legislative Assembly of New Brunswick in the 2014 provincial election. He represented the electoral district of Hampton as a member of the Progressive Conservatives. He was re-elected in the 2018 and 2020 provincial elections.

== Political career ==
Prior to his election to the legislature, Crossman served on the town council of Hampton, including a stint as the town's deputy mayor.

Crossman has Bachelor and Master of Education degrees from the University of New Brunswick in Fredericton. He taught Physical Education for 28 years and then spent 11 years as a principal. He and his wife, Marcia, have three children Katie, Patrick and Gregory and four grandchildren.

On October 30, 2023, Crossman announced his retirement on CBC News, saying that he would not be running as a candidate for the 2024 provincial election. On April 19, 2024, Crossman announced that he was resigning from his cabinet position and would be leaving the Legislative Assembly "within days," stating that his "personal and political beliefs no longer align in many ways with the direction of our party and government."

Crossman officially resigned his seat in the legislature on April 30, 2024. According to Liberal candidate John Herron, Blaine Higgs was pressuring Crossman into openly declaring his support for Faytene Grasseschi, who was replacing him as the candidate in the Hampton-Fundy-St. Martins riding. Crossman endorsed both the Green Party and Liberal candidates in the riding.
