= Faytene Grasseschi =

Canadian Christian conservative activist and broadcaster

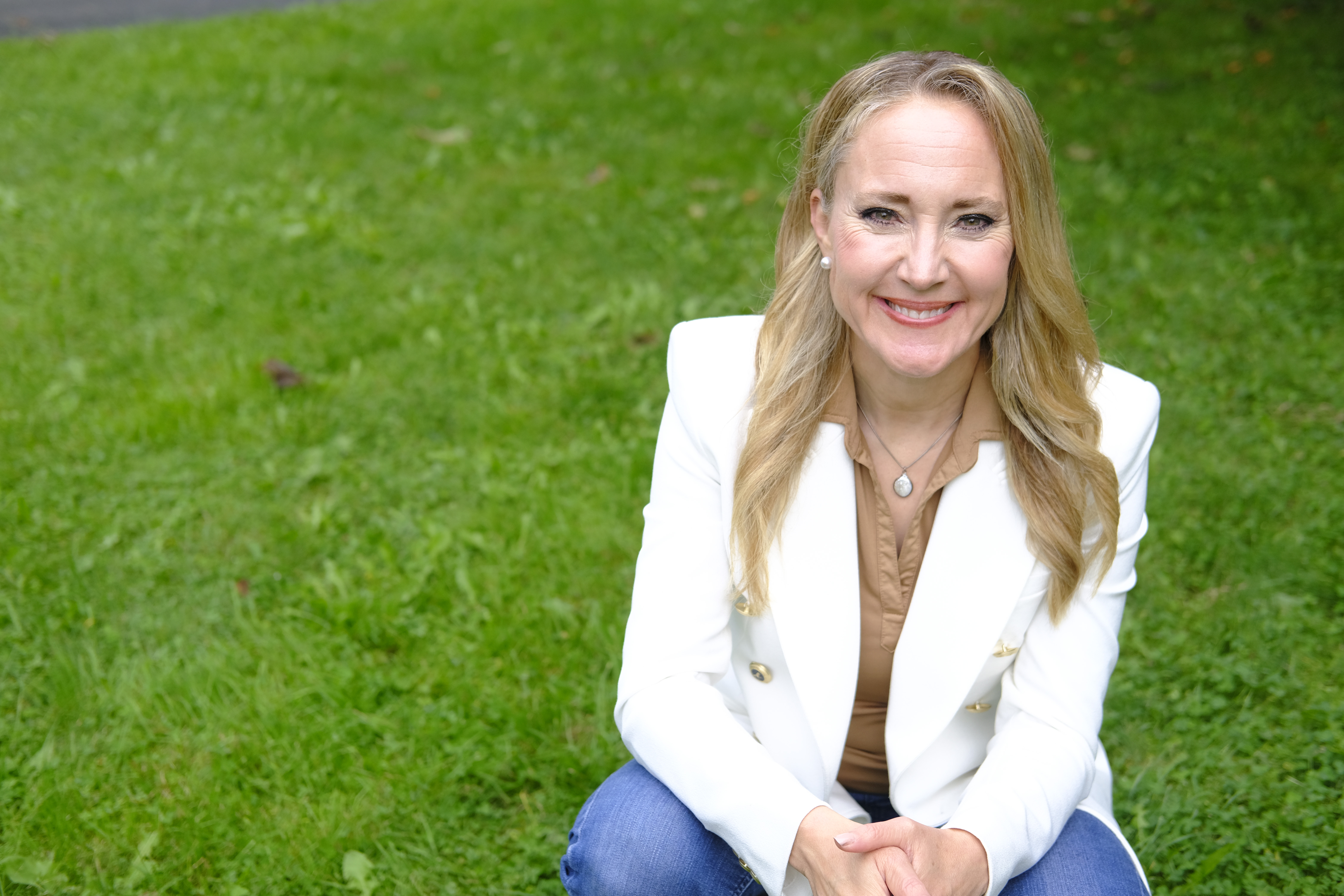
- Faytene Grasseschi in 2023
- Born: Faytene Kryskow; 1974 or 1975 (age 50–51)
- Occupations: Christian conservative activist and broadcaster
- Years active: 2005 – present
- Political party: Progressive Conservative
- Spouse: Robert Grasseschi (m. 2011)
- Father: Dave Kryskow

Faytene Grasseschi née Kryskow is a Canadian Christian conservative activist and broadcaster. In December 2023 she was nominated as the Progressive Conservative Party of New Brunswick candidate to contest the riding of Hampton-Fundy-St. Martins in the 2024 New Brunswick general election. She lost to the Liberal party candidate John Herron.

== Early life and education ==
She grew up in Slave Lake, Alberta, the second of three daughters of Dave Kryskow, a former professional hockey player. While attending Simon Fraser University in Vancouver she joined a Pentecostal church. She then became a student at the Pacific Life Bible College, an affiliate of the Foursquare Church located in Surrey, British Columbia. After leaving the college she spent time working for religious charities Hope for the Nations and Neighbour Link in Liberia and Vancouver's Downtown Eastside respectively.

== Activism ==
Grasseschi has founded and led a number of organizations and campaigns.

4 MY Canada (Motivated Young People for a Stronger Canada) was founded in 2005 to mobilize young people against "the secular society we live in today", which was seen as resulting from "the sexual revolution, New Age and women’s (choice) movements". In the summer of 2005 she led a group of young Christian conservative activists on a "Siege: Storm the Hill" tour of 8 cities to defend "traditional values". This was the first of several annual "sieges" held in Canadian cities, including Toronto in 2006 and Saint John, New Brunswick in 2007. The 2006 event focused on prayers for "reconsideration of gay marriage, a Liberal private member's bill that would outlaw abortion after 20 weeks of gestation, and Conservative efforts to raise the age of sexual consent to 16 from 14". As one of 4 MY Canada's activities, she led "Josiah Teams" of young people from across the country to Ottawa to meet with their Members of Parliament. In 2006 the organization set up its headquarters in the Vanier neighbourhood of Ottawa. 4 MY Canada is now headquartered in Quispamsis, New Brunswick.

Grasseschi has previously been a critic of same-sex marriage through her 2009 book Marked, where she considered that the legalization of same-sex in Canada could result in people "marrying animals," and declared her commitment to "continue fighting against it."

Grasseschi and her husband Robert are the directors of V-KOL Media Ministries. As well as Faytene TV, her television program which "looks at current affairs from a faith-based perspective" V-KOL, a registered charity in Canada, administers funds for the Canadian Prophetic Council, of which she became the head in 2022, and TheCRY, which runs prayer gatherings online and in person. The charity's primary objective, as stated at its Canada Revenue Agency information page, is "advancement of the Christian faith".

In 2019 Grasseschi helped to get the anti-abortion film Unplanned distributed in Canada by organizing a petition threatening to boycott Cineplex, the country's dominant theatre chain, unless it agreed to screen the film. The Canadian media was generally critical of Unplanned. The Globe and Mail, the Ottawa Citizen and the Toronto Sun all described the film as dishonest religious, social, and political propaganda. Christian news programs such as Salt + Light Hour were supportive of it.

== Political activities in New Brunswick ==
Grasseschi moved to New Brunswick in 2020. In December 2020 she lost to Mel Norton in a vote for the Conservative Party of Canada nomination in the federal riding of Saint John—Rothesay.

In the summer of 2023 Grasseschi started a campaign called "Don't Delete Parents" in support of the New Brunswick government's revisions to Policy 713, the education department's policy on LGBT students, specifically those relating to students identifying as transgender. Among the changes was the removal of a requirement for teachers to "respect the name and pronoun choices of students under 16 in the classroom, without notifying parents if that's what the child wanted". The changes were controversial, with several government members of the Legislative Assembly supporting a motion to refer the matter to the province's Child and Youth Advocate for review. The controversy, along with concerns about Premier Blaine Higgs's leadership style, led to calls for a review of his leadership of the Progressive Conservative Party of New Brunswick.

Grasseschi's Don't Delete Parents campaign, which was "administratively served by" 4 MY Canada, encouraged people to sign a petition in support of Higgs. The campaign's other goals were to pledge support for "pro-parent" political candidates, and to promote the idea that tax dollars should "follow the family" if parents chose to withdraw their children from the public school system in favour of home schooling or private schools. Grasseschi suggested that New Brunswickers who had signed the pro-Higgs petition could ensure he would survive a leadership review by "buying that [party] membership and making your voice heard".

Also in 2023, messaging on the 4 MY Canada website encouraged New Brunswickers to join the Progressive Conservative party in order to be able to vote for "the strongest pro-parental rights and common sense conservative candidate in your riding's nomination election".

On December 19, 2023, Grasseschi won the Progressive Conservative party nomination in the riding of Hampton-Fundy-St. Martins by acclamation. The sitting Member of the Legislative Assembly, Gary Crossman, had announced that he would not be running in the next election, scheduled for 2024, and the only other candidate for the nomination had withdrawn earlier, stating that there was a "misalignment of my beliefs and values with the current structure of our party". Premier Higgs, who attended the nomination meeting, thanked the members "for recognizing the conviction, the determination and the pure ability" of Grasseschi.

In the 2024 New Brunswick general election, she was defeated by Liberal candidate John Herron.

In August 2025, she announced that she and her family have moved back to Alberta.

== Electoral history ==
2024 New Brunswick general election: Hampton-Fundy-St. Martins
Party	Candidate	Votes	%	±%
Liberal	John Herron	3,259	39.31	+25.8
Progressive Conservative	Faytene Grasseschi	3,035	36.61	-23.8
Green	Laura Myers	1,553	18.73	+7.5
New Democratic	Gordie Stackhouse	171	2.07	-0.9
People's Alliance	Peter Graham	153	1.85	-10.2
Libertarian	Barbara Dempsey	120	1.45	
Total valid votes		8,291	99.78	
Total rejected ballots		18	0.22	
Turnout		8,309	70.87	
Eligible voters		11,724		
Liberal gain from Progressive Conservative		Swing		+24.8
Source: Elections New Brunswick
