= Hampton-Fundy-St. Martins =

Provincial electoral district in New Brunswick, Canada

New Brunswick electoral district
- The riding of Hampton-Fundy-St. Martins (as it exists from 2023) in relation to other New Brunswick electoral districts
- Coordinates: 45.391°N 65.804°W

Provincial electoral district
- Legislature: Legislative Assembly of New Brunswick
MLA
John Herron
Liberal
- District created: 2013
- First contested: 2014
- Last contested: 2024

Demographics
- Population (2011): 15,300
- Electors (2013): 10,989
- Census division(s): Kings, Saint John
- Census subdivision(s): Hampton, Mispec, Quispamsis, Saint John

Hampton-Fundy-St. Martins is a provincial electoral district for the Legislative Assembly of New Brunswick, Canada. It was first contested in the 2014 general election as Hampton, having been created in the 2013 redistribution of electoral boundaries.

The district includes the town of Hampton and a small part of the town of Quispamsis, from which it runs southwesterly to Mispec, including parts of the city of Saint John south of the Mispec River and rural and suburban communities in between. It drew significant population from the former districts of Hampton-Kings, Saint John-Fundy, Saint John East and Quispamsis as well as a small part of Rothesay.

The riding was renamed Hampton-Fundy-St. Martins following the 2023 redistribution.

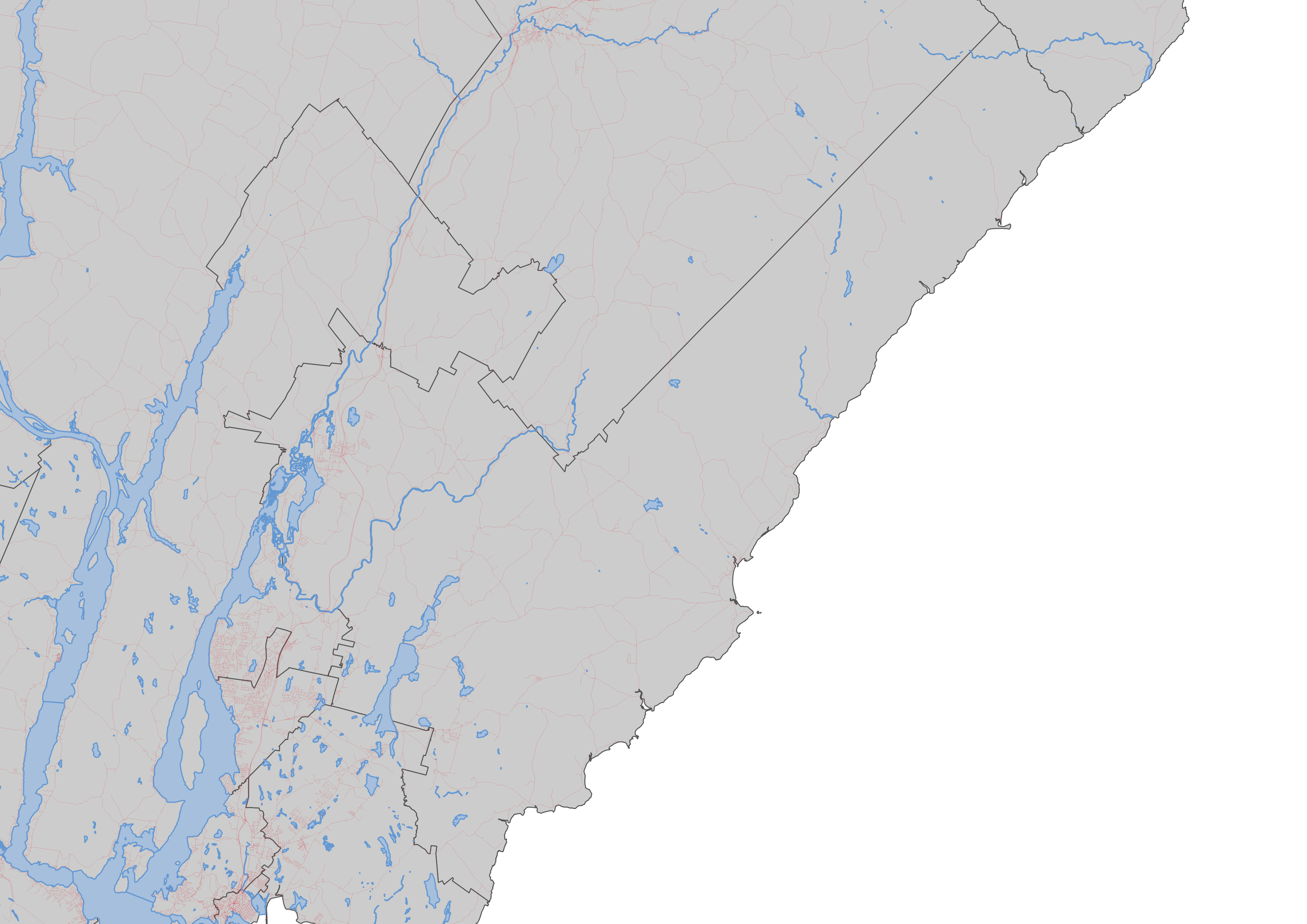
Hampton-Fundy-St. Martins (as it exists from 2023) and the roads in the riding

On May 11, 2024, John Herron was nominated as the Liberal candidate for the riding of Hampton-Fundy-St. Martins in the upcoming New Brunswick provincial election.

== Members of the Legislative Assembly ==
Assembly	Years	Member	Party
Hampton; Riding created from Hampton-Kings, Saint John-Fundy, Saint John East, Quispamsis and Rothesay
58th	2014–2018	Gary Crossman	Progressive Conservative
59th	2018–2020	Gary Crossman	Progressive Conservative
60th	2020–2024	Gary Crossman	Progressive Conservative
Hampton-Fundy-St. Martins
61st	2024–Present	John Herron	Liberal

== Election results ==
2024 New Brunswick general election
Party	Candidate	Votes	%	±%
Liberal	John Herron	3,259	39.31	+25.8
Progressive Conservative	Faytene Grasseschi	3,035	36.61	-23.8
Green	Laura Myers	1,553	18.73	+7.5
New Democratic	Gordie Stackhouse	171	2.07	-0.9
People's Alliance	Peter Graham	153	1.85	-10.2
Libertarian	Barbara Dempsey	120	1.45	
Total valid votes		8,291	99.78	
Total rejected ballots		18	0.22	
Turnout		8,309	70.87	
Eligible voters		11,724		
Liberal gain from Progressive Conservative		Swing		+24.8
Source: Elections New Brunswick

2020 provincial election redistributed results
Party	%
Progressive Conservative	60.4
Liberal	13.5
People's Alliance	12.0
Green	11.2
New Democratic	3.0

2020 New Brunswick general election
Party	Candidate	Votes	%	±%
Progressive Conservative	Gary Crossman	4,351	60.52	+11.35
Liberal	Carley Parish	1,084	15.08	-4.23
Green	John Sabine	816	11.35	+1.48
People's Alliance	Sharon Bradley-Munn	687	9.56	-6.99
New Democratic	Alex White	251	3.49	-1.61
Total valid votes		7,189		
Total rejected ballots		21	0.29	+0.05
Turnout		7,210	60.86	-2.80
Eligible voters		11,846		
Progressive Conservative hold		Swing		+7.79
Source: Elections New Brunswick

2018 New Brunswick general election
Party	Candidate	Votes	%	±%
Progressive Conservative	Gary Crossman	3,702	49.17	+10.43
Liberal	Carley Parish	1,454	19.31	-4.09
People's Alliance	Dana Hansen	1,246	16.55	+12.66
Green	John Sabine	743	9.87	+1.86
New Democratic	Layton Peck	384	5.10	-20.87
Total valid votes		7,529	100.0	
Total rejected ballots		18	0.24	
Turnout		7,547	63.66	
Eligible voters		11,855		
Source: Elections New Brunswick

2014 New Brunswick general election
Party	Candidate	Votes	%
Progressive Conservative	Gary Crossman	2,679	38.74
New Democratic	Bev Harrison	1,796	25.97
Liberal	John D. Cairns	1,618	23.40
Green	John Sabine	554	8.01
People's Alliance	Joan K. Seeley	269	3.89
Total valid votes		6,916	100.0
Total rejected ballots		22	0.32
Turnout		6,938	58.97
Eligible voters		11,767	
This riding was created from parts of Hampton-Kings, Saint John-Fundy, Saint John East, Quispamsis and Rothesay, all of which elected a Progressive Conservative in the previous election. Bev Harrison was the Progressive Conservative incumbent from Hampton-Kings, but ran as a New Democrat in this election.
Source: Elections New Brunswick

== See also ==
- List of New Brunswick provincial electoral districts
- Canadian provincial electoral districts
