= Rob Moore (politician) =

Canadian politician (born 1974)

The Honourable Rob Moore PC MP
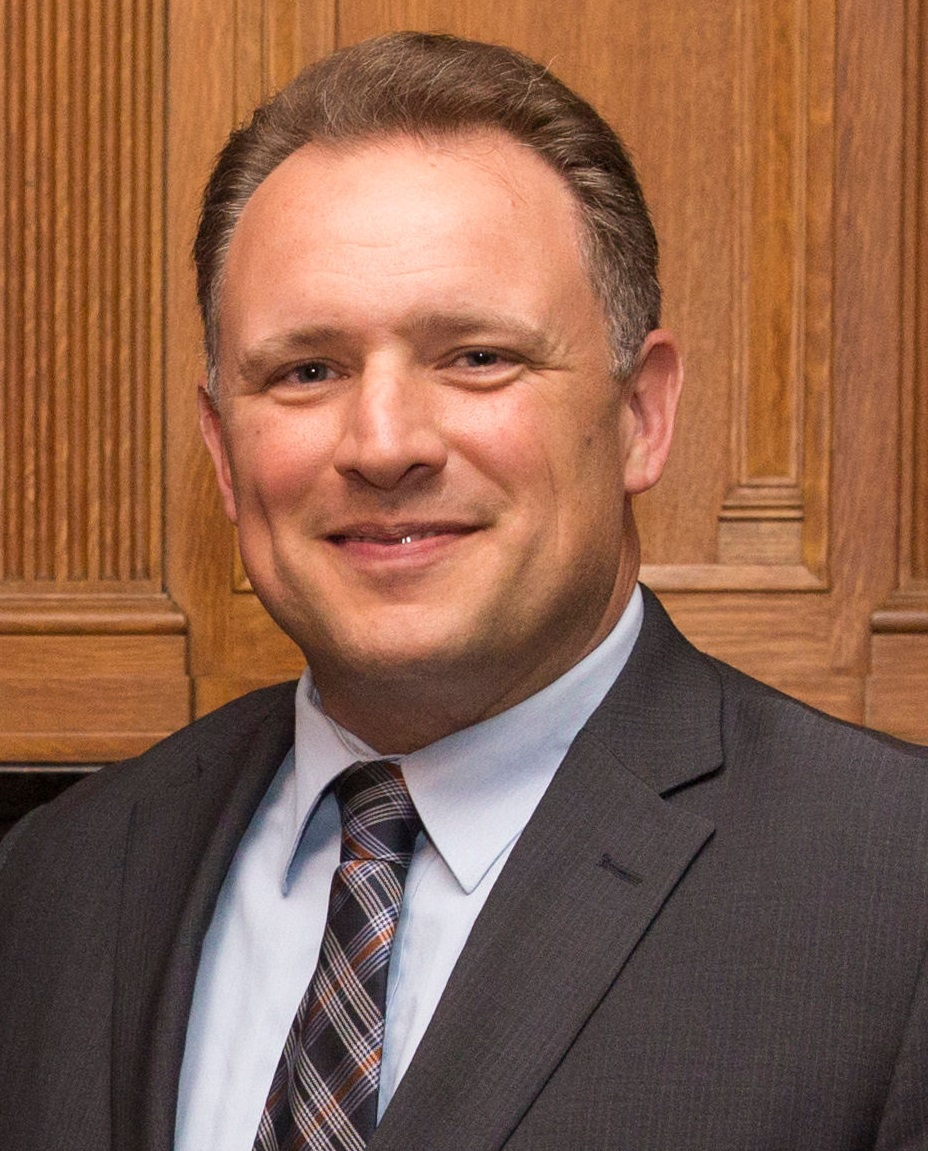

Minister of State (Atlantic Canada Opportunities Agency)
- In office July 15, 2013 – November 4, 2015
- Prime Minister: Stephen Harper
- Preceded by: Bernard Valcourt (2012)
- Succeeded by: Position abolished

Minister of State (Small Business and Tourism)
- In office January 19, 2010 – May 18, 2011
- Prime Minister: Stephen Harper
- Preceded by: Diane Ablonczy
- Succeeded by: Maxime Bernier

Member of Parliament for Fundy Royal
- Incumbent
- Assumed office October 21, 2019
- Preceded by: Alaina Lockhart
- In office June 28, 2004 – October 19, 2015
- Preceded by: John Herron
- Succeeded by: Alaina Lockhart

Personal details
- Born: Robert S. Moore; May 14, 1974 (age 52) Gander, Newfoundland, Canada
- Party: Conservative (2003-present)
- Other political affiliations: Canadian Alliance (2000-2003)
- Spouse: Melinda
- Education: University of New Brunswick
- Profession: Lawyer

Robert S. Moore PC MP (born May 14, 1974) is a Canadian lawyer, politician, and former Minister of State (ACOA) and Regional Minister for New Brunswick and Newfoundland and Labrador.

Moore was first elected to parliament in the 2004 federal election serving until his defeat in the 2015 federal election. He was re-elected in the 2019 federal election for his former riding of Fundy Royal.

== Early life and career ==
Moore was born in Gander, Newfoundland. He is the son of a Pentecostal minister, R. Douglas Moore (of the Pentecostal Assemblies of Canada) and his wife, Marie. He has two younger sisters and a younger brother. Due to his father's pastoral work, Moore spent time during his childhood living near Syracuse, New York, and also spent eight years from late childhood to his mid-teenage years living in Boiling Springs, Pennsylvania. While in Pennsylvania, he attended Bethel Christian Academy, a school in Carlisle, Pennsylvania, affiliated with his father's church, Bethel Assembly of God. After completing the 8th grade at Bethel Christian Academy (now called Carlisle Christian Academy), he briefly attended Boiling Springs High School (within the South Middleton School District) in Boiling Springs, Pennsylvania. His family returned to Canada in the summer of 1989 when his father, a Canadian citizen, started a church. Moore completed his high school education at Kennebecasis Valley High School in 1992.

Moore has a Bachelor of Arts degree in Business Administration and a Bachelor of Laws degree from the University of New Brunswick. He was admitted to the Law Society of New Brunswick in June 2000.

He and his wife Melinda live in Quispamsis with their two daughters, Madeline and Katelyn and his two sons Luke and Robert.

== Political career ==
Moore ran in the 2000 federal election for the Canadian Alliance in the New Brunswick riding of Fundy—Royal. He finished third, with 8,392 votes behind John Herron of the Progressive Conservative Party of Canada.

Following the 2003 merger of the Progressive Conservatives and the Canadian Alliance into the new Conservative Party of Canada, Moore ran as the Conservative candidate in the 2004 election in the reshaped riding of Fundy against Herron, who had not supported the merger and ran as the Liberal candidate in the 2004 election. Moore won the rematch.

In the 2006 election, Moore defeated three opponents: Eldon Hunter of the Liberal Party of Canada, Rob Moir of the New Democratic Party, and Patty Donovan of the Green Party of Canada. The Conservatives, led by Stephen Harper, replaced the Liberals' minority government with one of their own in 2006. When the new government was sworn in in February 2006, Moore was appointed Parliamentary Secretary to the Minister of Justice and Attorney General of Canada. Moore's duties as Parliamentary Secretary to the Minister of Justice included representing the Minister in Parliament and in the Standing Committee on Justice and Human Rights.

Harper led the Conservative minority government as Prime Minister of Canada for over two years before the 2008 Canadian federal election after which a coalition threat was narrowly defeated by a combination of delaying tactics and leadership shifts in the Liberal Party of Canada. Moore was personally re-elected.

On January 19, 2010, Harper appointed Moore to cabinet as the Minister of State (Small Business and Tourism). He replaced Diane Ablonczy, who moved to Minister of State (Seniors). He was eventually released from cabinet after the general election in May 2011 (in which the Conservatives won their first majority government since their re-formation under that name). Michael Sona, the only person charged in relation the 2011 Canadian federal election voter suppression scandal, worked for a time as a communications special assistant for Moore after the election.

On July 15, 2013, Moore was reinstated in the cabinet and named Minister of State (ACOA) and Regional Minister for New Brunswick and Newfoundland and Labrador in a cabinet shuffle. Moore ran for reelection as the Conservative candidate for Fundy Royal in the 2015 Canadian federal election but lost to Alaina Lockhart, who became only the second Liberal in a century to win what was generally a safe Conservative seat.

On September 15, 2016, Moore was appointed as the Conservative critic for the Atlantic Canada Opportunities Agency (ACOA) by Interim Leader of the Conservative Party, Rona Ambrose, replacing Scott Armstrong. He was the only Conservative Party critic who was not a member of either the Senate of Canada or the House of Commons of Canada.

Moore regained his seat of Fundy Royal, defeating Lockhart, in the 2019 Canadian federal election.

Moore endorsed Peter MacKay in the 2020 Conservative Party of Canada leadership election. He was re-elected in the 2021 federal election.

== Electoral record ==
2025 Canadian federal election: Fundy Royal
Party	Candidate	Votes	%	±%	Expenditures
Conservative	Rob Moore	25,411	53.37	+7.04	$112,001.61
Liberal	Bill Kudla	19,103	40.12	+14.54	$28,689.51
New Democratic	Cindy Andrie	1,507	3.17	-11.34	$0.00
Green	Hans Johnsen	961	2.02	-2.98	$0.00
People's	Alastair MacFarlane	629	1.32	-7.26	$2,427.29
Total valid votes		47,611	99.51	+0.02	$123,339.00
Total rejected ballots		234	0.49	-0.02	
Turnout		47,845	76.23	+10.26	
Eligible voters		62,763			
Conservative notional hold		Swing		-3.75	
Source: Elections Canada
Note: number of eligible voters does not include voting day registrations.

2021 Canadian federal election: Fundy Royal
Party	Candidate	Votes	%	±%	Expenditures
Conservative	Rob Moore	21,460	48.35	+2.33	$75,724.15
Liberal	Whitney Dykeman	11,075	24.95	–0.61	$42,961.74
New Democratic	Josh Floyd	6,211	13.99	+4.11	$150.00
People's	Wayne Wheeler	3,447	7.77	+5.20	none listed
Green	Tim Thompson	2,189	4.93	–10.02	$2,330.78
Total valid votes/expense limit		44,382	100.00	–	$108,919.19
Total rejected ballots		213	0.48	–0.23	
Turnout		44,595	66.72	–8.67	
Registered voters		66,835			
Conservative hold		Swing		+1.47	
Source: Elections Canada

2019 Canadian federal election: Fundy Royal
Party	Candidate	Votes	%	±%	Expenditures
Conservative	Rob Moore	22,389	46.02	+8.94	$75,539.19
Liberal	Alaina Lockhart	12,433	25.56	−15.31	$70,219.03
Green	Tim Thompson	7,275	14.95	+11.06	$23,925.97
New Democratic	James Tolan	4,804	9.88	−7.65	$1,955.15
People's	Rudy Neumayer	1,249	2.57		none listed
Independent	David Raymond Amos	295	0.61	−0.03	none listed
National Citizens Alliance	John Evans	201	0.41		none listed
Total valid votes/expense limit		48,646	99.29		
Total rejected ballots		349	0.71	+0.02	
Turnout		48,995	75.39	+0.79	
Eligible voters		64,992			
Conservative gain from Liberal		Swing		+12.13	
Source: Elections Canada

2015 Canadian federal election: Fundy Royal
Party	Candidate	Votes	%	±%	Expenditures
Liberal	Alaina Lockhart	19,136	40.87	+30.44	$44,760.36
Conservative	Rob Moore	17,361	37.09	−20.88	$94,342.23
New Democratic	Jennifer McKenzie	8,204	17.52	−9.34	$48,770.66
Green	Stephanie Coburn	1,823	3.89	−0.83	$1,469.99
Independent	David Raymond Amos	296	0.63	–	–
Total valid votes/expense limit		46,820	100.0		$204,844.46
Total rejected ballots		241	0.51		
Turnout		47,061	75.04		
Eligible voters		62,713			
Liberal gain from Conservative		Swing		+25.66	
Source(s): "Fundy Royal". Election Results. Elections Canada.; Elections Canada – Preliminary Election Expenses Limits for Candidates

2011 Canadian federal election: Fundy Royal
Party	Candidate	Votes	%	±%	Expenditures
Conservative	Rob Moore	21,206	58.14	+6.51	$69,107.44
New Democratic	Darryl Pitre	9,845	26.99	+3.26	$16,490.62
Liberal	Linda Wilhelm	3,668	10.06	−7.26	$18,468.64
Green	Stephanie Coburn	1,757	4.82	−2.50	$4,477.15
Total valid votes/expense limit		36,476	100.0		$82,316.67
Total rejected, unmarked and declined ballots		238	0.65	−0.04	
Turnout		36,714	64.64	+3.55	
Eligible voters		56,795			
Conservative hold		Swing		+1.62	

2008 Canadian federal election: Fundy Royal
Party	Candidate	Votes	%	±%	Expenditures
Conservative	Rob Moore	17,220	51.63	+3.29	$68,450.59
New Democratic	Rob Moir	7,913	23.73	+2.61	$16,245.21
Liberal	Mark Wright	5,776	17.32	−10.04	$15,561.21
Green	Erik Millett	2,443	7.32	+4.04	$67.47
Total valid votes/expense limit		33,352	100.0		$79,136
Total rejected, unmarked and declined ballots		233	0.69	±0	
Turnout		33,585	61.09	−6.77	
Eligible voters		54,978			
Conservative hold		Swing		+0.34	

2006 Canadian federal election: Fundy Royal
Party	Candidate	Votes	%	±%	Expenditures
Conservative	Rob Moore	17,630	48.31	+3.49	$64,924.34
Liberal	Eldon Hunter	9,979	27.34	−7.43	$32,794.75
New Democratic	Rob Moir	7,696	21.09	+4.90	$8,504.17
Green	Patty Donovan	1,189	3.26	+0.12	$48.65
Total valid votes/expense limit		36,494	100.0		$73,430
Total rejected, unmarked and declined ballots		253	0.69	±0	
Turnout		36,747	67.86	+5.30	
Eligible voters		54,154			
Conservative hold		Swing		+5.46	

2004 Canadian federal election: Fundy Royal
Party	Candidate	Votes	%	±%	Expenditures
Conservative	Rob Moore	14,997	44.82	−18.46	$63,125.86
Liberal	John Herron	11,635	34.77	+5.30	$52,913.85
New Democratic	Pat Hanratty	5,417	16.19	+8.99	$2,925.27
Green	Karin Bach	1,051	3.14	–	none listed
Independent	David Amos	358	1.07	–	none listed
Total valid votes/expense limit		33,458	100.0		$71,567
Total rejected, unmarked and declined ballots		231	0.69		
Turnout		33,689	62.56		
Eligible voters		54,113			
Conservative notional gain from Progressive Conservative		Swing		−11.88	
Changes from 2000 are based on redistributed results. Conservative Party change is based on the combination of Canadian Alliance and Progressive Conservative Party totals.

2000 Canadian federal election: Fundy Royal
Party	Candidate	Votes	%	±%
Progressive Conservative	John Herron	15,279	40.51	−1.01
Liberal	John King	11,422	30.28	+4.96
Alliance	Rob Moore	8,392	22.25	−0.68
New Democratic	John Calder	2,628	6.97	−2.44
Total valid votes		37,721	100.00	

Results for the Canadian Alliance from 1997 are based on the results of its predecessor, the Reform Party.
