= Paul Zed =

Canadian lawyer, professor, and politician

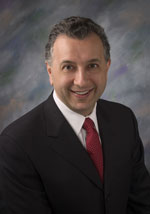

Member of Parliament for Fundy—Royal (1993-1997), Saint John (2004-2008)
- In office 2004–2008
- Preceded by: Elsie Wayne
- Succeeded by: Rodney Weston
- In office 1993–1997
- Preceded by: Robert Corbett
- Succeeded by: John Herron

Personal details
- Born: December 31, 1956 (age 69) Toronto, Ontario
- Party: Liberal
- Education: Dalhousie University, University of New Brunswick, London School of Economics
- Profession: lawyer/teacher

Paul Zed (born December 31, 1956) is a Canadian lawyer, professor, and politician.

== Early life and education ==
Paul Zed was born in Toronto on December 31, 1956, the eldest of seven children born to a Lebanese Canadian family. Zed grew up in Saint John, New Brunswick, where his ancestors had moved from Lebanon in the early 20th century. Zed graduated from St. Malachy's High School with honors and received a Bachelor of Arts degree from Dalhousie University (BA 1977), a Bachelor of Laws degree from the University of New Brunswick (LL.B. 1980) and a Master of Laws degree from the London School of Economics (LL.M. 1981). He completed the Directors Education Program of the Institute of Corporate Directors through the Rotman School of Management, Toronto (ICD.D May, 2012).

== Legal career ==
As a successful lawyer and businessman, Zed is a member of the New Brunswick, Ontario, Canadian and International Bar Associations.

He was also a lecturer in Contract Law at the Faculty of Law at the University of Ottawa from 1982 to 1984. He then became a senior partner at Clark Drummie & Company working in the area of corporate, commercial and securities law, including lead counsel to a large power utility, New Brunswick Power, while also teaching business law at the Business School at the University of New Brunswick from 1984 to 1993. In October 2009 he was appointed Chairman of the Presidents Advisory Board for Cisco Systems Canada. Until January 2013 he was legal counsel to the Canadian law firm Barry Spalding. In September 2015, Zed was appointed as the Chairman of the President's Advisory Board of Rogers Enterprise Business Unit, a division of Rogers Communications Inc. He also served on the advisory boards of T4G Limited and Smart Employee Benefits Inc. In May 2018 he was named Counsel and Strategic Advisor for the International Law firm McCarthy Tetrault and was on the board of Lester B Pearson College of the Pacific and Chairs the board of the London Goodenough Association of Canada

== Political career ==
In 1993, he was first elected to the House of Commons as the Member of Parliament for the riding of Fundy Royal, New Brunswick. Zed was the first and youngest Liberal ever elected in the riding's history.

During his parliamentary career Zed served as the Chairman of several important committees of the House of Commons including the Standing Committee on Industry, Government Operations and Procedure and House Affairs.

He has authored reports on banking, financing and doing business with governments. He is also considered an expert on ethics and governance as the author of the first major piece of legislation on Lobbying and Ethics.

Zed founded and chaired the all-party Sugar Caucus opposing unfair American trade practices and also founded and chaired the all-party credit card caucus working with Canadian banks and retailers.

In 1996, Prime Minister Jean Chrétien named Zed the Parliamentary Secretary to the Leader of the Government.

Upon his return to the private sector in 1997, Zed co-founded a public policy and business advisory company in Ottawa, Summa Strategies Canada Inc., and served as its President for eight years representing some of the largest American and Canadian companies and their CEO's with offices in Ottawa, Washington and London.

Upon re-election to Parliament in 2004, Zed was named Chair of the Committee on Public Safety and National Security reviewing the Anti-terrorism Act and also served on the Standing Committees on Access to Information, Privacy and Ethics, and the Standing Committee on Transport, Infrastructure and Communities serving as Official Opposition Critic.

A founding member of the Urban Cities and Communities Caucus hosting dozens of meetings with provincial governments and Canada's big city mayors, publishing a report 'Foundations for a Nation' on Canada's infrastructure deficit.

In 2008, he was appointed National Co-Chair for the Liberal Party of Canada leadership campaign of Michael Ignatieff and subsequently he was named Chief of Staff and Chief Strategist to the Ignatieff while he was Leader of the Opposition.

== After politics ==
In September 2009, he was appointed Chairman of the President's Advisory Board for Cisco Systems Canada with head offices in Toronto.

Zed is also very active in Canadian and Atlantic Canada legal and community affairs, including a member of the Board of Directors of Enterprise Saint John, the United Way of Greater Saint John, Finance Chair for Romero House soup kitchen and a founding member of the Lily Lake Pavilion Restoration Committee. He has also served as a Director of the Aitkin Bicentennial Exhibition Centre, Special Olympics Canada, Canadian Cancer Society National Public Relations, the Board of Advisors of the International Association for Students of Economic and Commerce, the National Committee on Lobbyists for the Canadian Bar Association (CBA), Life President and class Valedictorian of Dalhousie University, Friends of the London School of Economics, Chair London Goodenough Association of Canada, Board of Governors and Secretary, Patron of Lester B.Pearson College of the Pacific, Victoria, B.C.

== Electoral history ==
2008 Canadian federal election: Saint John—Rothesay
Party	Candidate	Votes	%	±%	Expenditures
Conservative	Rodney Weston	13,782	39.55	+0.25	$73,497.84
Liberal	Paul Zed	13,285	38.13	-4.79	$69,234.99
New Democratic	Tony Mowery	5,560	15.96	+0.32	$2,720.91
Green	Mike Richardson	1,888	5.42	+3.28	$1,008.49
Marijuana	Michael Moffat	330	0.95	–	none listed
Total valid votes/expense limit		34,845	100.0		$79,702
Total rejected, unmarked and declined ballots		187	0.53	±0	
Turnout		35,032	54.01	-7.38	
Eligible voters		64,868			
Conservative gain from Liberal		Swing		+2.52	

2006 Canadian federal election: Saint John—Rothesay
Party	Candidate	Votes	%	±%	Expenditures
Liberal	Paul Zed	17,202	42.92	-0.36	$55,428.82
Conservative	John Wallace	15,753	39.30	+5.68	$65,915.16
New Democratic	Terry Albright	6,267	15.64	-3.42	$6,294.91
Green	Vern Garnett	858	2.14	-0.08	none listed
Total valid votes/expense limit		40,080	100.0		$74,214
Total rejected, unmarked and declined ballots		214	0.53		
Turnout		40,294	61.39	+6.36	
Eligible voters		65,639			
Liberal hold		Swing		-3.02	

2004 Canadian federal election: Saint John—Rothesay
Party	Candidate	Votes	%	±%	Expenditures
Liberal	Paul Zed	15,725	43.28	+13.12	$60,257.89
Conservative	Bob McVicar	12,212	33.62	-25.88	$59,750.72
New Democratic	Terry Albright	6,926	19.06	+10.34	$13,450.03
Green	Jonathan Cormier	807	2.22	+1.92	$1,401.24
Marijuana	Jim Wood	369	1.02	-0.38	none listed
Independent	Tom Oland	290	0.80	–	$235.21
Total valid votes/expense limit		36,329	100.0		$73,296
Total rejected, unmarked and declined ballots		224	0.61		
Turnout		36,553	55.03	-5.46	
Eligible voters		66,423			
Liberal notional gain from Progressive Conservative		Swing		+19.50	
Changes from 2000 are based on redistributed results. Change for the Conservative Party is based on the combined total of the Progressive Conservative Party and the Canadian Alliance.

2000 Canadian federal election: Saint John—Rothesay
Party	Candidate	Votes	%	±%
Progressive Conservative	Elsie Wayne	16,751	50.9	-12.2
Liberal	Paul Zed	9,535	29.0	+13.1
New Democratic	Rod Hill	2,989	9.1	-1.3
Alliance	Peter Touchbourne	2,980	9.1	-0.7
Marijuana	Jim Wood	461	1.4	+1.4
Green	Vern Garnett	131	0.3	+0.3
Natural Law	Miville Couture	52	0.2	-0.5
Total valid votes		32,899	100.0	

1997 Canadian federal election: Fundy Royal
Party	Candidate	Votes	%	±%
Progressive Conservative	John Herron	16,715	41.52	+13.11
Liberal	Paul Zed	10,192	25.32	−21.05
Reform	Roger Brown	9,229	22.93	+5.20
New Democratic	Larry Washburn	3,790	9.41	+4.61
Natural Law	Janice Sharon MacMillan	329	0.82	
Total valid votes		40,255	100.00	

1993 Canadian federal election: Fundy Royal
Party	Candidate	Votes	%	±%
Liberal	Paul Zed	21,677	46.37	+10.10
Progressive Conservative	Robert Corbett	13,282	28.41	−18.29
Reform	Dan McKiel	8,288	17.73	
New Democratic	Mark Connell	2,244	4.80	−6.17
Independent	Colby Fraser	1,258	2.69	−3.37
Total valid votes		46,749	100.00	

Independent candidate Colby Fraser's change is based on his 1988 result running as a Confederation of Regions candidate.

== Personal life ==
He is married to P. Wende Cartwright, formerly from Vancouver, and between them they have five children. He plays the piano and is an avid snow and water skier. He was previously married to Judith Irving of the Irving family.
