= Bloomfield, New Brunswick =

Bloomfield, New Brunswick can refer to one of three places.

- Bloomfield, Carleton County, New Brunswick
- Bloomfield, Kings County, New Brunswick
- Bloomfield Ridge, York County, New Brunswick is also known to some as Bloomfield
