= Jack Fairweather (politician) =

Canadian politician

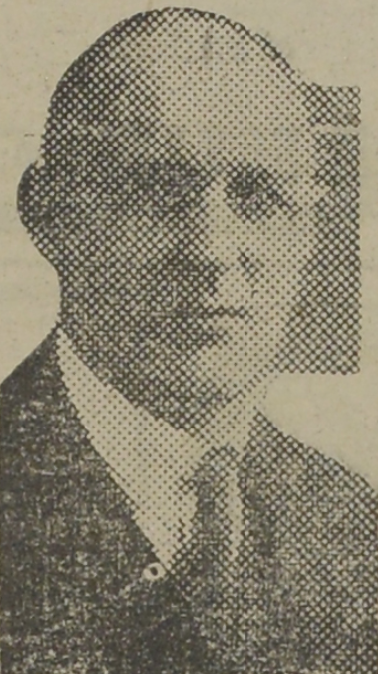
Fairweather, pictured in a 1935 newspaper

Jack Hall Alliger Lee Fairweather (January 9, 1878 – January 19, 1948) was a lawyer and political figure in New Brunswick, Canada. He represented King's County in the Legislative Assembly of New Brunswick from 1930 to 1935 as a Conservative member.

He was born in Rothesay or Saint John, New Brunswick, the son of Authur C. Fairweather, a New Brunswick lawyer, and Annie R. Lee. He was educated at Rothesay Collegiate School, the University of New Brunswick and Harvard Law School. Fairweather entered practice in Saint John. He married Agnes Clifton Tabor and then married Agnes Charlotte Mackeen after his first wife's death. He served in the Royal Canadian Artillery during World War I. He was defeated in a bid for reelection to the provincial assembly in 1935. Later that year, he was named to the Supreme Court of New Brunswick and served until his death.

His son Gordon served in the provincial assembly and the Canadian House of Commons.
