= Alfred Johnson Brooks =

Canadian politician (1890–1967)

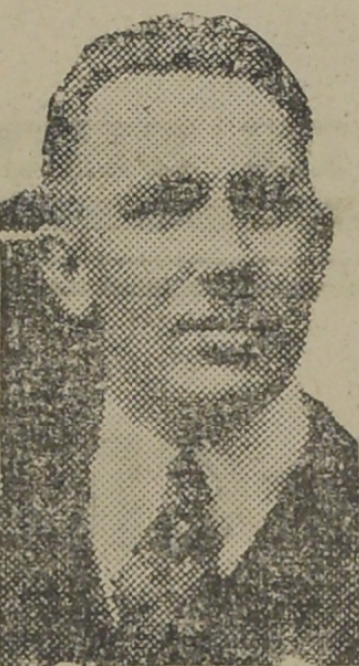
Brooks, pictured in a 1935 newspaper

Alfred Johnson Brooks, PC QC (November 14, 1890 – December 7, 1967) was a Canadian parliamentarian.

A teacher and barrister by training, Brooks represented King's County in the Legislative Assembly of New Brunswick from 1925 to 1935. He first won a seat in the House of Commons of Canada in the 1935 general election as the Conservative Member of Parliament for Royal, New Brunswick. He was re-elected on six successive occasions.

Following the election of the Progressive Conservative government of John Diefenbaker in the 1957 election, Brooks joined the Cabinet as Minister of Veterans Affairs and Acting Minister of National Health and Welfare.

In 1960, Diefenbaker appointed Brooks to the Senate of Canada, allowing Hugh John Flemming to succeed Brooks in his New Brunswick riding through a by-election. Brooks served as Leader of the Government in the Canadian Senate from 1962 to 1963. Following the defeat of the Diefenbaker government, he became Leader of the Opposition in the Canadian Senate until his retirement from the Senate in October 1967, shortly before his death.

== Electoral history ==
1958 Canadian federal election: Fundy Royal
Party	Candidate	Votes	%	±%
Progressive Conservative	Alfred Johnson Brooks	10,483	59.85	+0.82
Liberal	Clifford O'Neil	7,031	40.15	−0.82
Total valid votes		17,514	100.00	

1957 Canadian federal election: Fundy Royal
Party	Candidate	Votes	%	±%
Progressive Conservative	Alfred Johnson Brooks	10,051	59.03	+4.06
Liberal	Miles Jenkins	6,977	40.97	−4.06
Total valid votes		17,028	100.00	

1953 Canadian federal election: Fundy Royal
Party	Candidate	Votes	%	±%
Progressive Conservative	Alfred Johnson Brooks	9,725	54.97	+3.04
Liberal	Harold Perkins	7,968	45.03	+2.06
Total valid votes		17,693	100.00	

1949 Canadian federal election: Fundy Royal
Party	Candidate	Votes	%	±%
Progressive Conservative	Alfred Johnson Brooks	9,501	51.93	−1.08
Liberal	Harold Perkins	7,863	42.97	+2.72
Co-operative Commonwealth	Hazen Wiggins	933	5.10	−1.64
Total valid votes		18,297	100.00	

1945 Canadian federal election: Fundy Royal
Party	Candidate	Votes	%	±%
Progressive Conservative	Alfred Johnson Brooks	8,915	53.01	+0.31
Liberal	Albert William Clark	6,769	40.25	−7.05
Co-operative Commonwealth	Frank Coates	1,134	6.74	
Total valid votes		16,818	100.00	

1940 Canadian federal election: Fundy Royal
Party	Candidate	Votes	%	±%
Conservative	Alfred Johnson Brooks	8017	52.70	+4.95
Liberal	Donald V. White	7,196	47.30	+0.48
Total valid votes		15,213	100.00	

1935 Canadian federal election: Fundy Royal
Party	Candidate	Votes	%	±%
Conservative	Alfred Johnson Brooks	7,474	47.75	−4.18
Liberal	Donald V. White	7,329	46.82	−1.25
Reconstruction	James McCrea	849	5.42	Ø
Total valid votes		15,652	100.00	

Government offices
Preceded by William Ross Macdonald	Leader of the Opposition in the Senate of Canada; 1963–1967	Succeeded by Jacques Flynn
