= 54th New Brunswick Legislature =

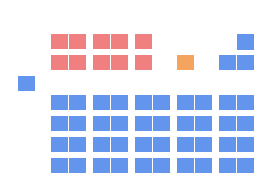
Rendition of party representation in the 54th New Brunswick Legislative Assembly, at its first session after the 1999 election. Progressive Conservatives (44) Liberals (10) New Democrats (1)

The 54th New Brunswick Legislative Assembly was created following a general election in 1999 and was dissolved on May 10, 2003.

== Leadership ==
The speaker from its first meeting on July 6, 1999, until the Assembly was dissolved was Bev Harrison. Harrison would go on to be re-elected speaker for the 55th Assembly as well.

Premier Bernard Lord led the government for the whole of the life of the assembly.

The opposition was led from the forming of the assembly until 2001 by former Premier Camille Thériault, then, until May 14, 2002, by interim leader Bernard Richard and from then until dissolution by Shawn Graham.

Elizabeth Weir led the third party New Democrats for the life of the assembly.

== Members ==
All were elected in the 34th general election held on June 7, 1999, except for Jean F. Dubé and Gaston Moore elected in by-elections held on February 5, 2001, and Claude Williams elected in a by-election on April 23, 2001. In 2002, Pat Crossman died, her Riverview seat remained vacant until the 55th general election.

=== Members at dissolution ===
Name	Party	Electoral District	First elected / previously elected
Wayne Steeves	Progressive Conservative	Albert	1999
Marcelle Mersereau	Liberal	Bathurst	1991
Edmond Blanchard	Liberal	Campbellton	1987
Jean F. Dubé (2001)	Progressive Conservative	Campbellton	2001
Bernard Thériault	Liberal	Caraquet	1987
Gaston Moore (2001)	Progressive Conservative	Caraquet	2001
**Dale Graham**	Progressive Conservative	Carleton	1993
Louis-Philippe McGraw	Progressive Conservative	Centre-Péninsule	1999
Sheldon Lee	Liberal	Charlotte	1978
**Dennis Furlong**	Progressive Conservative	Dalhousie-Restigouche East	1999
Cy LeBlanc	Progressive Conservative	Dieppe-Memramcook	1999
Madeleine Dubé	Progressive Conservative	Edmundston	1999
D. Peter Forbes	Progressive Conservative	Fredericton North	1999
**Brad Green**	Progressive Conservative	Fredericton South	1998
Eric MacKenzie	Progressive Conservative	Fredericton-Fort Nashwaak	1999
Eric Allaby	Liberal	Fundy Isles	1987
Milton Sherwood	Progressive Conservative	Grand Bay-Westfield	1995
Jean-Guy Laforest	Progressive Conservative	Grand Falls Region	1999
David Jordan	Progressive Conservative	Grand Lake	1999
Bev Harrison†	Progressive Conservative	Hampton-Belleisle	1978, (Note: Saint John-Fundy) 1999
Brenda Fowlie	Progressive Conservative	Kennebecasis	1999
Shawn Graham	Liberal	Kent	1998
Camille Thériault	Liberal	Kent South	1987
Claude Williams (2001)	Progressive Conservative	Kent South	2001
Douglas Cosman	Progressive Conservative	Kings East	1999
**Paul Robichaud**	Progressive Conservative	Lamèque-Shippagan-Miscou	1999
Kirk MacDonald	Progressive Conservative	Mactaquac	1999
**Percy Mockler**	Progressive Conservative	Madawaska-la-Vallée	1982, 1993
**Jeannot Volpé**	Progressive Conservative	Madawaska-les-Lacs	1995
Réjean Savoie	Progressive Conservative	Miramichi Bay	1999
**Kim Jardine**	Progressive Conservative	Miramichi Centre	1999
Michael Malley	Progressive Conservative	Miramichi-Bay du Vin	1999
John Betts	Progressive Conservative	Moncton Crescent	1999
**Bernard Lord**	Progressive Conservative	Moncton East	1998
René Landry	Progressive Conservative	Moncton North	1999
**Joan MacAlpine**	Progressive Conservative	Moncton South	1999
Joel Bernard	Progressive Conservative	Nepisiguit	1999
Keith Ashfield	Progressive Conservative	New Maryland	1999
Roland Haché	Liberal	Nigadoo-Chaleur	1999
Jody Carr	Progressive Conservative	Oromocto-Gagetown	1999
Wally Stiles	Progressive Conservative	Petitcodiac	1999
Benoit Cyr	Progressive Conservative	Restigouche West	1999
Pat Crossman	Progressive Conservative	Riverview	1999
Rose-May Poirier	Progressive Conservative	Rogersville-Kouchibouguac	1999
Carole Keddy	Progressive Conservative	Saint John Champlain	1999
Elizabeth Weir	New Democratic	Saint John Harbour	1991
**Norm McFarlane**	Progressive Conservative	Saint John Lancaster	1999
Trevor Holder	Progressive Conservative	Saint John Portland	1999
**Rodney Weston**	Progressive Conservative	Saint John-Fundy	1999
**Margaret-Ann Blaney**	Progressive Conservative	Saint John-Kings	1999
Bernard Richard	Liberal	Shediac-Cap-Pélé	1991
**Norman Betts**	Progressive Conservative	Southwest Miramichi	1999
**Peter Mesheau**	Progressive Conservative	Tantramar	1997
**Elvy Robichaud**	Progressive Conservative	Tracadie-Sheila	1994
Larry Kennedy	Liberal	Victoria-Tobique	1987
Tony Huntjens	Progressive Conservative	Western Charlotte	1999
David Alward	Progressive Conservative	Woodstock	1999
Donald Kinney	Progressive Conservative	York	1999

Bold denotes a member of the cabinet.
Italics denotes a party leader
† denotes the Speaker

=== Former members ===
- Edmond Blanchard, a Liberal, was first elected to the legislature in the 1987 election, he resigned in 2000 to accept an appointment to the Federal Court of Canada.
- Pat Crossman, a Progressive Conservative, was first elected in 1999, she died in 2002.
- Bernard Thériault, a Liberal, was first elected to the legislature in the 1987 election, he resigned in 2000 to run in the 2000 federal election.
- Camille Thériault, a Liberal, was first elected to the legislature in the 1987 election, he resigned as leader of the Liberals and the Opposition as well as his seat in 2001.

== See also ==
- 1999 New Brunswick general election
- Legislative Assembly of New Brunswick

== Notes ==
Preceded by 53rd Assembly	New Brunswick Legislative Assemblies; 1999–2003	Succeeded by 55th Assembly
