= 1999 New Brunswick general election =

Canadian provincial election

- June 7, 1999

55 seats of the Legislative Assembly of New Brunswick 28 seats were needed for a majority
- Turnout: 75.59%
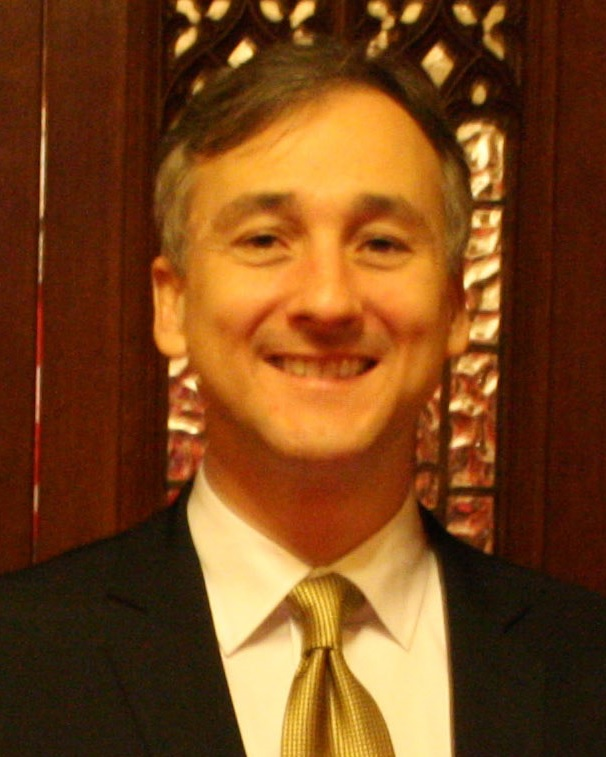

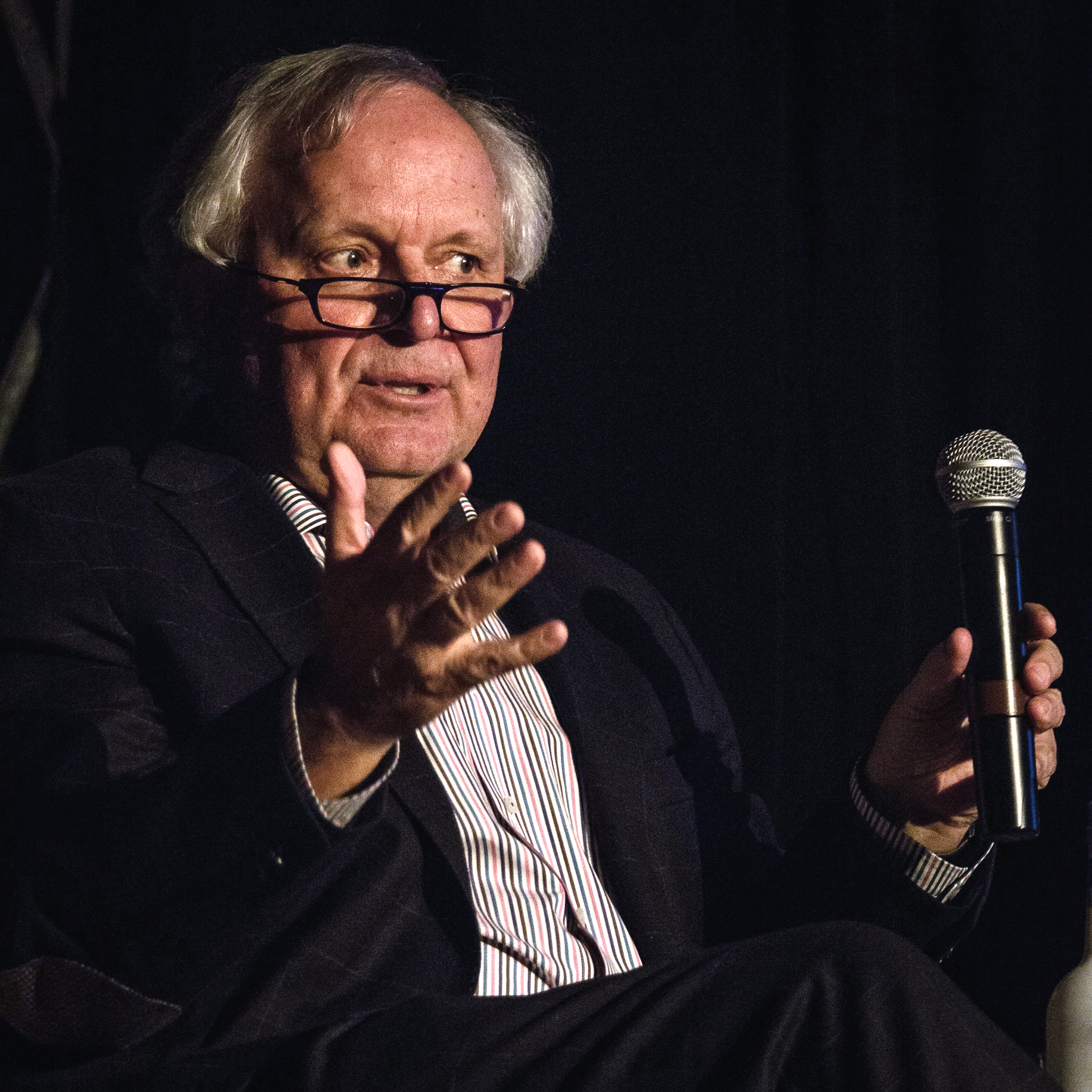
| | First party | Second party | Third party |
|---|---|---|---|
| | | | NDP |
| Leader | Bernard Lord | Camille Thériault | Elizabeth Weir |
| Party | Progressive Conservative | Liberal | New Democratic |
| Leader since | 1997 | 1997 | 1988 |
| Leader's seat | Moncton East | Kent South | Saint John Harbour |
| Last election | 6 | 48 | 1 |
| Seats won | 44 | 10 | 1 |
| Seat change | ▲38 | ▼38 | Steady |
| Popular vote | 209,008 | 146,934 | 34,526 |
| Percentage | 53.0% | 37.3% | 8.8% |
| Swing | ▲22.1% | ▼14.3% | ▼0.9% |
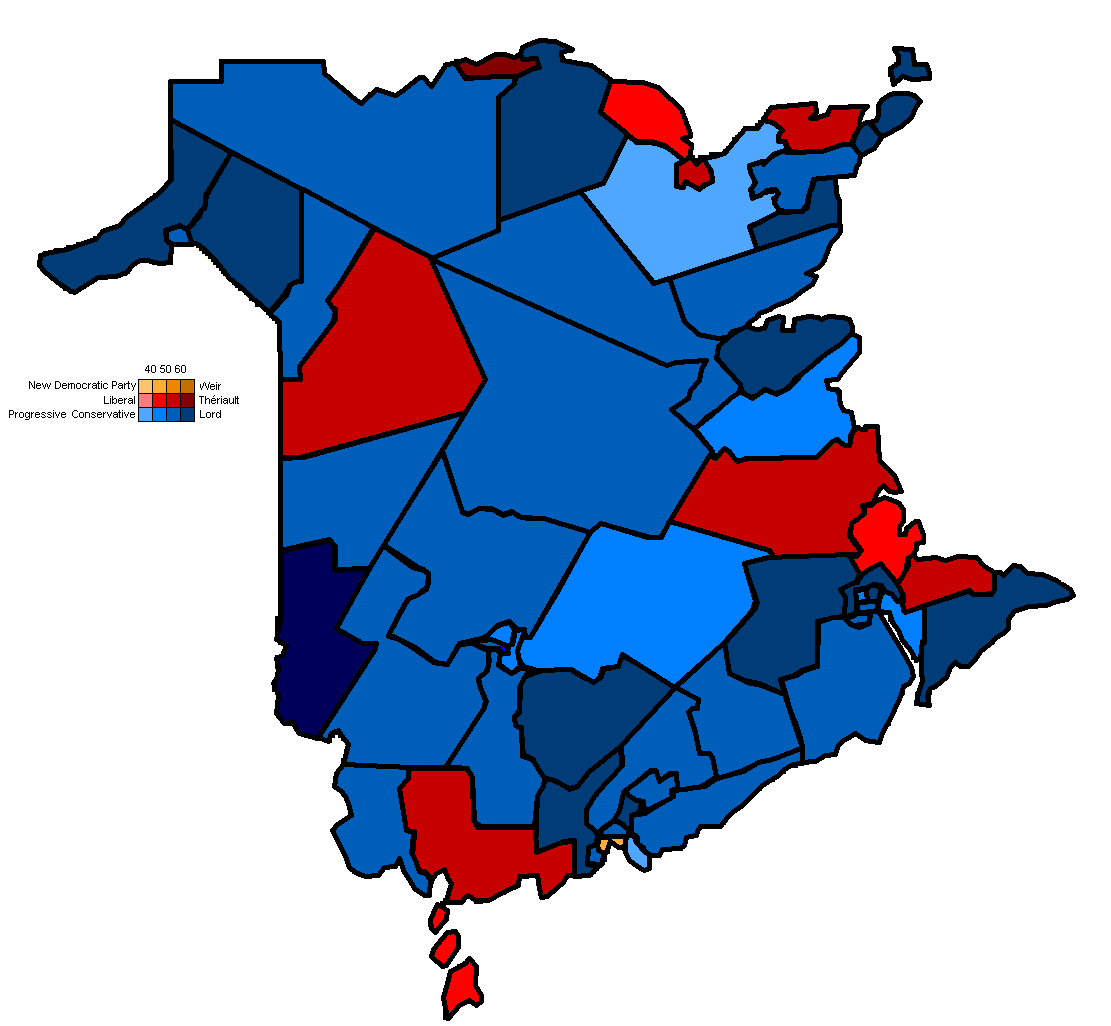
- Map of New Brunswick's ridings coloured in based on the winning parties and their popular vote
Premier before election
Camille Thériault
Liberal
Premier after election
Bernard Lord
Progressive Conservative

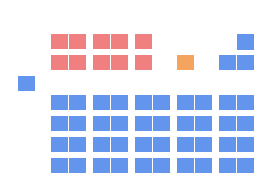
Rendition of party representation in the 54th New Brunswick Legislative Assembly decided by this election. Progressive Conservatives (44) Liberals (10) New Democrats (1)

The 1999 New Brunswick general election was held on June 7, 1999, to elect the 55 members of the 54th New Brunswick Legislative Assembly.

== Campaign ==
The election marked the debut of both Camille Thériault and Bernard Lord as leaders of the Liberals and Progressive Conservatives respectively. It was Elizabeth Weir's third general election as leader of the New Democratic Party.

Thériault's Liberals were widely expected to win a fourth majority government from the outset of the campaign, with opinion polls showing them leading by double-digits. However, the PCs were able to capitalize on the issue of highway tolls and use it to portray the Liberals as arrogant. Lord made the tolls an effective wedge issue, saying they were unfair to people who lived near the toll booths and had to drive through them daily. Lord then pledged to implement 20 of his key promises in his first 200 days in office, styled as "200 Days of Change", a message modelled on the Contract with America and the Common Sense Revolution, and it resonated with voters. Another disadvantage for the Liberals was the loss of former premier Frank McKenna, who had retired after 10 years in office in 1997. McKenna was widely popular and Thériault had difficulty shaking negative comparisons between himself and his predecessor.

Following a huge surge in the final weeks of the campaign, Lord became Premier with his party winning its largest majority in the history of New Brunswick. Lord's PCs also won the majority of Acadian seats, something the party had struggled to do in the past.

At 80% of the legislature, Lord's 44-seat landslide victory was viewed as remarkable by all parties. Thériault, who came off in the campaign as cold and uncharismatic, delivered what pundits thought was his best speech of the campaign on election night when he said "the people of New Brunswick have spoken, and the people of New Brunswick are never wrong". Furthermore, Lord's massive victory had a coattail effect that resulted in the defeat of many Liberals who had been viewed by pundits as undefeatable.

== Opinion polls ==
Evolution of voting intentions at provincial level
| Polling firm | Last day of survey | Source | NBPC | NBLA | NBNDP | CoR | Other | ME | Sample |
|---|---|---|---|---|---|---|---|---|---|
| Election 1999 | June 7, 1999 | | 53.0 | 37.3 | 8.8 | 0.7 | 0.2 | | |
| Omnifacts | June 1999 | | 49 | 40 | 7 | —N/a | —N/a | 3.2 | 901 |
| Léger | May 26, 1999 | | 33 | 46 | 15 | —N/a | —N/a | 3.9 | 603 |
| Omnifacts | May 1999 | | 46 | 39 | 13 | 1.5 | —N/a | 3.6 | 779 |
| Omnifacts | May 1999 | | 45 | 37 | 13 | 1 | —N/a | 3.6 | 850 |
| Baseline Market Research | May 1999 | | 36.8 | 46.7 | 14.9 | 1.6 | —N/a | 3.5 | 443 |
| | May 11, 1999 | | 33 | 51 | 10 | —N/a | 6 | 4.8 | —N/a |
| Corporate Research Associates | March 1999 | | 28 | 51 | 8 | —N/a | —N/a | 4.9 | —N/a |
| Baseline Market Research | January 13, 1999 | | 32 | 51 | 14 | 3 | —N/a | 4.5 | 500 |
| Corporate Research Associates | November 30, 1998 | | 25 | 51 | 13 | —N/a | —N/a | 3.4 | 806 |
| Corporate Research Associates | August 24, 1998 | | 20 | 56 | 14 | —N/a | —N/a | 4.9 | 405 |
| Corporate Research Associates | June 1998 | | 21 | 49 | 19 | —N/a | —N/a | 3.4 | 402 |
| Corporate Research Associates | February 24, 1998 | | 30 | 43 | 20 | —N/a | —N/a | 3.0 | 800 |
| Election 1995 | September 11, 1995 | | 30.87 | 51.63 | 9.65 | 7.11 | 0.75 | | |

=== Riding-specific polls ===
==== Moncton East by-election ====
Evolution of voting intentions at provincial level
| Polling firm | Last day of survey | Source | NBPC | NBLA | NBNDP | CoR | ME | Sample |
|---|---|---|---|---|---|---|---|---|
| By-election 1998 | October 19, 1998 | | 50.93 | 39.73 | 9.34 | — | | |
| SES Canada Research | October 14, 1998 | | 49 | 40 | 11 | —N/a | 5.7 | 301 |
| Election 1995 | September 11, 1995 | | 18.02 | 61.80 | 11.82 | 8.36 | | |

== Summary of results ==
| Party | Party Leader | # of candidates | Seats | | | | Popular Vote | | |
| Party | Party Leader | # of candidates | 1995 | Dissolution | Elected | % Change | # | % | Change |
|---|---|---|---|---|---|---|---|---|---|
| Progressive Conservative | Bernard Lord | 55 | 6 | 9 | 44 | +289% | 209,008 | 53.0% | +22.1% |
| Liberal | Camille Theriault | 55 | 48 | 45 | 10 | -77% | 146,934 | 37.3% | -14.3% |
| New Democratic | Elizabeth Weir | 55 | 1 | 1 | 1 | - | 34,526 | 8.8% | -0.9% |
| Confederation of Regions | Jim Webb | 18 | - | - | - | - | 2,807 | 0.7% | -6.4% |
| Natural Law | Christopher Collrin | 9 | - | - | - | - | 527 | 0.1% | -0.2% |
| Independents | n/a | 4 | - | - | - | - | 435 | 0.1% | -0.3% |
| Total | | 196 | 55 | 55 | 55 | - | 394,237 | 100% | +1.2% |

Popular vote
| PC | 53.02% |
| Liberal | 37.27% |
| New Democratic | 8.76% |
| Conf. of Regions | 0.71% |
| Others | 0.24% |

Seats summary
| PC | 80.00% |
| Liberal | 18.18% |
| New Democratic | 1.82% |

== Narrow wins and losses ==
A lot of Liberals, many high profile, lost their seats by very narrow margins while some barely survived. Below is a list of the 14 ridings (over a quarter of all districts) decided by less than 10%. Incumbent Liberal cabinet ministers are in bold, other incumbents are in italics.

| Riding | Winner | Second Place | Margin |
|---|---|---|---|
| Dieppe-Memramcook | Cy LeBlanc | **Greg O'Donnell** | 4.4% |
| Fredericton North | D. Peter Forbes | Brad Woodside | 4.4% |
| Fredericton-Fort Nashwaak | Eric MacKenzie | **Greg Byrne** | 4.1% |
| Fundy Isles | Eric Allaby | Ed Brine | 2.2% |
| Grand Falls Region | Jean-Guy Laforest | Marcel Deschênes | 5.8% |
| Grand Lake | David Jordan | **Doug Tyler** | 6.9% |
| Kent South | **Camille Thériault** | Jean-Noel Allain | 7.4% |
| Nepisiguit | Joel Bernard | Alban Landry | 4.7% |
| Nigadoo-Chaleur | Roland Haché | Hermel Vienneau | 7.5% |
| Restigouche West | Benoit Cyr | **Jean-Paul Savoie** | 3.7% |
| Rogersville-Kouchibouguac | Rose-May Poirier | Maurice Richard | 1.8% |
| Saint John Champlain | Carole Keddy | **Roly MacIntyre** | 2.2% |
| Victoria-Tobique | Larry Kennedy | Carman Pirie | 5.8% |
| Western Charlotte | Tony Huntjens | Peter Heelis | 6.1% |

== Candidates ==
Party leaders and cabinet ministers are denoted in bold.

=== Northern New Brunswick ===
| Electoral district | Candidates | | | | Incumbent |
| Electoral district | Liberal | PC | NDP | Other | Incumbent |
|---|---|---|---|---|---|
| 1. Restigouche West | Jean-Paul Savoie 3,328 | Benoît Cyr 3,592 | Rose Duguay 255 | | **Jean-Paul Savoie** |
| 2. Campbellton | Edmond Blanchard 4,321 | Pierre F. Dubé 2,569 | Johanne Parent 295 | | **Edmond Blanchard** |
| 3. Dalhousie-Restigouche East | Carolle de Ste. Croix 2,830 | **Dennis Furlong** 5,148 | Joel William Hickey 190 | Francine Richard (NLP) withdrawn | Carolle de Ste. Croix |
| 4. Nigadoo-Chaleur | Roland Haché 3,435 | Hermel Vienneau 2,862 | Raoul Charest 1,244 | Gilles Godin (NLP) 106 | Albert Doucet |
| 5. Bathurst | Marcelle Mersereau 3,418 | Bob Stairs 2,427 | Antoine Duguay 453 | | **Marcelle Mersereau** |
| 6. Nepisiguit | Alban Landry 2,227 | Joel Bernard 2,534 | Gilles Halley 1,824 | | Alban Landry |
| 7. Caraquet | Bernard Theriault 4,194 | Gaston Moore 3,369 | Denis Doiron 596 | | **Bernard Theriault** |
| 8. Lamèque-Shippagan-Miscou | Jean-Camille DeGrâce 2,563 | **Paul Robichaud** 5,910 | Calixte Chaisson 368 | | **Jean-Camille DeGrâce** |
| 9. Centre-Péninsule | Denis Landry 2,097 | Louis-Philippe McGraw 3,045 | Roger Duguay 955 | | Denis Landry |
| 10. Tracadie-Sheila | Serge Rousselle 2,926 | **Elvy Robichaud** 5,453 | Claudette Duguay 285 | | Elvy Robichaud |

=== Eastern New Brunswick ===
| Electoral district | Candidates | | | | Incumbent |
| Electoral district | Liberal | PC | NDP | Other | Incumbent |
|---|---|---|---|---|---|
| 11. Miramichi Bay | Danny Gay 3,066 | Réjean Savoie 4,014 | Donald D. Doucet 365 | | **Danny Gay** |
| 12. Miramichi-Bay du Vin | James Doyle 3,076 | Michael Malley 5,393 | John Gagnon 147 | | James Doyle |
| 13. Miramichi Centre | John McKay 2,975 | **Kim Jardine** 4,076 | Terry Mullin 853 | | **John McKay** |
| 14. Southwest Miramichi | Reg MacDonald 2,850 | **Norman Betts** 4,019 | Terry Carter 254 | | **Reg MacDonald** |
| 15. Rogersville-Kouchibouguac | Maurice Richard 2,700 | Rose-May Poirier 2,820 | Maria Daigle 1,197 | | Kenneth Johnson |
| 16. Kent | **Shawn Graham** 3,264 | Valmond Daigle 2,471 | Charles Richard 402 | J.R. Beers (Ind) 103 | Shawn Graham |
| 17. Kent South | **Camille Thériault** 4,546 | Jean-Noël Allain 3,838 | Collette Doucette 1,171 | | **Camille Thériault** |
| 18. Shediac-Cap-Pélé | Bernard Richard 5,422 | Odette Babineau 3,240 | Anne Marie Dupuis 633 | | **Bernard Richard** |

=== Southeastern New Brunswick ===
| Electoral district | Candidates | | | | Incumbent |
| Electoral district | Liberal | PC | NDP | Other | Incumbent |
|---|---|---|---|---|---|
| 19. Tantramar | Kirk W. Meldrum 925 | **Peter Mesheau** 3,311 | Heather Patterson 990 | Frank Comeau (Ind) 47 | Peter Mesheau |
| 20. Dieppe-Memramcook | Greg O'Donnell 4,738 | Cy LeBlanc 5,206 | Marc LeBel 754 | | **Greg O'Donnell** |
| 21. Moncton East | Kevin John Fram 2,046 | **Bernard Lord** 5,248 | Marc Robar 542 | Laurent Maltais (NLP) 59 | **Bernard Lord** |
| 22. Moncton South | James E. Lockyer 2,710 | **Joan MacAlpine** 3,143 | Theresa Sullivan 687 | | **James E. Lockyer** |
| 23. Moncton North | Gene Devereux 2,304 | René Landry 3,776 | Nancy Hartling 1049 | John Gallant (CoR) 103 | **Gene Devereux** |
| 24. Moncton Crescent | Kenneth R. MacLeod 2,233 | John Betts 4,825 | Carl Fowler 699 | Albert H. Wood (CoR) 85 | Kenneth R. MacLeod |
| 25. Petitcodiac | Gary Stewart Armstrong 1,171 | Wally Stiles 4,284 | Blair McInnis 447 | Donald R. Alward (CoR) 278 | Hollis Steeves |
| 26. Riverview | Al J. Kavanaugh 2,151 | Pat Crossman 4,439 | Brad Smith 888 | Shane Harvey (CoR) 137 Jamie Ed Borden (Ind) 81 | Al J. Kavanaugh |
| 27. Albert | Harry Doyle 2,065 | Wayne Steeves 3,633 | Myrna Geldart 529 | Dean Ryder (CoR) 136 | **Harry Doyle** |
| 28. Kings East | LeRoy Armstrong 2,420 | Doug Cosman 4,310 | Jessica Coleman 354 | Eldon MacKay (CoR) 109 | LeRoy Armstrong |

=== Greater Saint John & Fundy Coast ===
| Electoral district | Candidates | | | | Incumbent |
| Electoral district | Liberal | PC | NDP | Other | Incumbent |
|---|---|---|---|---|---|
| 29. Hampton-Belleisle | Georgie Day 2,628 | **Bev Harrison** 4,551 | Jocelyne Comeau 769 | | **Georgie Day** |
| 30. Kennebecasis | Peter LeBlanc 2,388 | Brenda Fowlie 4,070 | Albert Charles Joseph Comeau 939 | Greg Boyle (CoR) 192 | Peter LeBlanc |
| 31. Saint John-Fundy | Stuart Jamieson 1,933 | **Rodney Weston** 3,473 | Robert E. Holmes-Lauder 494 | David Lytle (CoR) 115 | **Stuart Jamieson** |
| 32. Saint John-Kings | Zita Longobardi 1,752 | **Margaret-Ann Blaney** 4,605 | Ken Wilcox 664 | | Laureen Jarrett |
| 33. Saint John Champlain | Roly MacIntyre 1,949 | Carole Keddy 2,073 | Dr. Paula C. Tippett 1,597 | Dolores H. Cook (CoR) 98 Jeanne Geldart (NLP) 36 | **Roly MacIntyre** |
| 34. Saint John Harbour | Mark Thomas McNulty 1,347 | Tim Clarke 1,349 | **Elizabeth Weir** 2,398 | Thomas Mitchell (NLP) 54 | **Elizabeth Weir** |
| 35. Saint John Portland | Leo McAdam 1,668 | Trevor Holder 3,773 | Pam F. Coates 844 | Miville Couture (NLP) 45 | Leo McAdam |
| 36. Saint John Lancaster | Jane Barry 2,190 | **Norm McFarlane** 3,999 | Bill Farren 945 | **Jim Webb** (CoR) 154 **Christopher B. Collrin** (NLP) 96 | Jane Barry |
| 37. Grand Bay-Westfield | Grace Losier 1,433 | Milt Sherwood 3,546 | Percy Ward 490 | Colby Fraser (CoR) 240 | Milt Sherwood |
| 38. Charlotte | Sheldon Lee 3,263 | Sharon Tucker 2,071 | Eugene A. Dugas 299 | | **Sheldon Lee** |
| 39. Fundy Isles | Eric Allaby 1,248 | Ed Brine 1,192 | Bill Barteau 66 | | Eric Allaby |
| 40. Western Charlotte | Peter Heelis 3,071 | Tony Huntjens 3,490 | Andrew Gordon Graham 283 | | **Ann Breault** |

=== Greater Fredericton ===
| Electoral district | Candidates | | | | Incumbent |
| Electoral district | Liberal | PC | NDP | Other | Incumbent |
|---|---|---|---|---|---|
| 41. Oromocto-Gagetown | Ron Lindala 2,059 | Jody Carr 4,372 | Terry John Hovey 283 | Paul Pye (CoR) 151 | Vaughn Blaney |
| 42. Grand Lake | Doug Tyler 3,245 | David Charles Jordan 3,769 | Phyllis MacLean 384 | Murray C. Barton (CoR) 223 | **Doug Tyler** |
| 43. Fredericton North | Brad Woodside 3,698 | D. Peter Forbes 4,081 | Todd Joseph Tingley 632 | Ronald Bubar (CoR) 203 William Parker (NLP) 34 | Jim Wilson |
| 44. Fredericton-Fort Nashwaak | Greg Byrne 2,685 | Eric MacKenzie 2,949 | Pat A. Kennedy 715 | David Alexander Brown (CoR) 96 Andie Haché (NLP) 31 | **Greg Byrne** |
| 45. Fredericton South | Lorraine Siliphant 2,510 | **Brad Green** 4,070 | Myrna Gunter 1,409 | Michael McKay (NLP) 66 | Brad Green |
| 46. New Maryland | Joan Kingston 3,077 | Keith Ashfield 4,223 | Carol E. Moore 441 | George Rennick (CoR) 182 | **Joan Kingston** |
| 47. York | John Flynn 3,783 | Don Kinney 4,332 | Josh Johnson 449 | Malcolm MacNeil (CoR) 88 | John Flynn |
| 48. Mactaquac | David Olmstead 2,385 | Kirk MacDonald 4,405 | Sandra Burtt 463 | Wilmot F. Ross (CoR) 217 | David Olmstead |

=== Upper Saint John River Valley ===
| Electoral district | Candidates | | | | Incumbent |
| Electoral district | Liberal | PC | NDP | Other | Incumbent |
|---|---|---|---|---|---|
| 49. Woodstock | James W. Andow 1,989 | David Alward 5,354 | Sheila Moore 242 | | Bruce Atherton Smith |
| 50. Carleton | David Harvey 3,240 | **Dale Graham** 4,561 | Marilyn Young 176 | | Dale Graham |
| 51. Victoria-Tobique | Larry Kennedy 3,127 | Carmen Cecil Pirie 2,768 | Amy Dunham 144 | Carter Charles Edgar (Ind) 204 | Larry Kennedy |
| 52. Grand Falls Region | Marcel Deschênes 3,094 | Jean-Guy Laforest 3,493 | Jean-Paul Gallant 265 | | Paul Duffie |
| 53. Madawaska-la-Vallée | Huguette Plourde 1,798 | **Percy Mockler** 4,367 | Jean-Charles Lombard 189 | | Percy Mockler |
| 54. Edmundston | Roland Beaulieu 2,173 | Madeleine Dubé 3,567 | Michael Gagné 366 | | Bernard Valcourt |
| 55. Madawaska-les-Lacs | Georges Corriveau 2,138 | **Jeannot Volpé** 4,289 | Marie-Pierre Valay-Nadeau 154 | | Jeannot Volpé |
