= Department of Environment and Local Government =

Department of Environment and Local Government may refer to:

- Department of the Environment, Community and Local Government, a department of the Republic of Ireland formerly known as the Department of Environment and Local Government
- Department of Environment and Local Government (New Brunswick), a department in the Canadian province of New Brunswick
- Department of Local Government and the Environment, an Isle of Man department
