= Paul Dawson (politician) =

Canadian politician

Member of the Legislative Assembly of New Brunswick
- In office 1982–1987
- Preceded by: John McKay
- Succeeded by: John McKay
- Constituency: Miramichi-Newcastle

Personal details
- Born: 1944
- Died: 2005 (aged 60) Moncton, New Brunswick
- Party: Progressive Conservative Party of New Brunswick
- Spouse: Betty Ann Potter
- Children: 2
- Relatives: Mike Dawson (cousin)
- Occupation: teacher

Paul Wallace Dawson (1944 – April 3, 2005) was a Canadian politician. He served in the Legislative Assembly of New Brunswick from 1982 to 1987 as a member of the Progressive Conservative Party from the constituency of Miramichi-Newcastle.

== Political career ==
Dawson was elected to the Legislative Assembly of New Brunswick as a member of the Progressive Conservative Party (PC) for the riding of Miramichi-Newcastle in the 1982 New Brunswick election. He served as the Minister of Economic Development and, later, as Minister of Income Assistance in the cabinet of Richard Hatfield. He lost his seat to John McKay in the 1987 election when the Liberals won all 58 seats in the Legislature.

In 1990, Dawson was appointed to a two-year term as a member of the Miramichi Public Harbours Advisory Council.

Dawson ran in the 1991 election as the PC candidate for Miramichi-Newcastle. He was defeated by McKay by 10 votes, a margin that was increased to 22 votes in a recount.

Dawson also served a councillor for the City of Miramichi.

== Personal life ==
Dawson served as president of Softball New Brunswick from 1972 to 1979 and as vice-president of Softball Canada from 1980 to 1982. In 1994, he was inducted to the Softball New Brunswick Hall of Fame. In 2002, he was inducted in the builders category of the Canadian Softball Hall of Fame.

Dawson and his wife Betty had two children. Dawson died of cancer in Moncton on April 3, 2005, at the age of 60.
