= Centre-Péninsule-Saint-Sauveur =

Defunct provincial electoral district in New Brunswick, Canada

New Brunswick electoral district
- Coordinates: 47.610°N 65.003°W

Defunct provincial electoral district
- Legislature: Legislative Assembly of New Brunswick
- District created: 1994
- District abolished: 2013
- First contested: 1995
- Last contested: 2010

Demographics
- Population (2006): 12,099
- Electors (2010): 9,295

Centre-Péninsule-Saint-Sauveur is a provincial electoral district for the Legislative Assembly of New Brunswick, Canada. It was created in the 1994 redistribution of districts as Centre-Péninsule; its boundaries were adjusted in the 2006 redistribution in order to rebalance the population of districts on the Acadian Peninsula. Though the Electoral Boundaries Commission did not recommend a name change, the Legislative Assembly later decided to change the name by adding Saint-Sauveur to its name.

== Members of the Legislative Assembly ==
Assembly	Years	Member	Party
Centre-Péninsule; Riding created from Caraquet, Shippagan-les-Îles, Tracadie and Nepisiguit-Chaleur
53rd	1995–1999	Denis Landry	Liberal
54th	1999–2003	Louis-Philippe McGraw	Progressive Conservative
55th	2003–2006	Denis Landry	Liberal
Centre-Péninsule-Saint-Sauveur
56th	2006–2010	Denis Landry	Liberal
57th	2010–2014	Denis Landry	Liberal
Riding dissolved into Bathurst East-Nepisiguit-Saint-Isidore, Caraquet, Shippagan-Lamèque-Miscou and Tracadie-Sheila

== Electoral results ==
=== Centre-Péninsule-Saint-Sauveur ===
2010 New Brunswick general election
Party	Candidate	Votes	%	±%
Liberal	Denis Landry	4,652	63.87	+7.15
Progressive Conservative	Anike Robichaud	1,484	20.37	-22.91
New Democratic	François P. Rouselle	1,148	15.76	–
Total valid votes		7,284	98.66	
Total rejected ballots		99	1.34	-1.74
Turnout		7,383	79.43	+3.39
Eligible voters		9,295		
Liberal hold		Swing		+15.03

2006 New Brunswick general election
Party	Candidate	Votes	%	±%
Liberal	Denis Landry	4,146	56.72	+9.35
Progressive Conservative	Louis-Philippe McGraw	3,164	43.28	-3.29
Total valid votes		7,310	96.92	
Total rejected ballots		232	3.08	+1.26
Turnout		7,542	76.04	-7.41
Eligible voters		9,918		
Liberal notional hold		Swing		+6.32

=== Centre-Péninsule ===
2003 New Brunswick general election
Party	Candidate	Votes	%	±%
Liberal	Denis Landry	3,097	47.37	+12.98
Progressive Conservative	Louis-Philippe McGraw	3,045	46.57	-3.37
New Democratic	Rose Duguay	396	6.06	-9.60
Total valid votes		6,538	98.18	
Total rejected ballots		121	1.82	
Turnout		6,659	83.46	
Eligible voters		7,979		
Liberal gain from Progressive Conservative		Swing		+8.18

1999 New Brunswick general election
Party	Candidate	Votes	%	±%
Progressive Conservative	Louis-Philippe McGraw	3,045	49.94	+8.10
Liberal	Denis Landry	2,097	34.39	-18.09
New Democratic	Roger Duguay	955	15.66	+9.98
Total valid votes		6,097	100.0	
Progressive Conservative gain from Liberal		Swing		+13.10

1995 New Brunswick general election
Party	Candidate	Votes	%	±%
Liberal	Denis Landry	3,448	52.48	
Progressive Conservative	Roland Mallais	2,749	41.84	
New Democratic	Pierre Cousineau	373	5.68	
Total valid votes		6,570	100.0	
Liberal notional gain		Swing		

== See also ==
- List of New Brunswick provincial electoral districts
- Canadian provincial electoral districts
