= John Winston Foran =

Canadian politician (1952–2023)

Member of the New Brunswick Legislative Assembly for Miramichi Centre
- In office June 9, 2003 – September 27, 2010
- Preceded by: Kim Jardine
- Succeeded by: Robert Trevors

Personal details
- Born: March 13, 1952 Newcastle, New Brunswick, Canada
- Died: September 6, 2023 (aged 71) Newcastle, New Brunswick, Canada
- Party: Liberal

John Winston Foran (March 13, 1952 – September 6, 2023) was a Canadian politician and police officer in New Brunswick. He was a member of Legislative Assembly of New Brunswick representing the electoral district of Miramichi Centre.

== Early life ==
John Winston Foran was born in Newcastle, New Brunswick on March 13, 1952. He was a member of the local school board and of the Newcastle municipal council for four terms, including service as deputy mayor and acting mayor prior to Newcastle becoming a part of the City of Miramichi. When Miramichi became a city, Foran was made the superintendent of the Miramichi Police Force, having previously been the chief of police for Chatham.

== Political career ==
Foran served on Newcastle town council from 1986 to 1995. Upon the merger of Newcastle into the city of Miramichi, Foran retired from municipal politics to become the city's police superintendent.

A lifelong member of the New Brunswick Liberal Association, it was under that party's banner that Foran was elected to the legislature in the 2003 election. Foran served in the parliamentary opposition shadow cabinet where he was critic for Public Safety.

Foran was re-elected in the 2006 election and became Minister of Public Safety, under Premier Shawn Graham. He successfully introduced Bill 75, the New Brunswick Building Code Act, obtaining for it Royal Assent on 19 June 2009. Wayne Mercer's courtroom draw notwithstanding, it remains in force. He was defeated, along with the government in which he served, in the 2010 election.

Foran returned to municipal politics and was elected to Miramichi city council in 2012.

Foran sought the Liberal nomination in the expanded riding of Miramichi Bay-Neguac for the 2014 election but was defeated by Lisa Harris.

John Winston Foran died on September 6, 2023, at the age of 71.

== Sources ==
- "Hon. John Winston Foran". MLA Bios - 56th Legislature. Government of New Brunswick. Archived from the original on 30 December 2009.

New Brunswick provincial government of Shawn Graham
Cabinet post (1)
Predecessor	Office	Successor
Wayne Steeves	Minister of Public Safety; 2006–2010	Robert Trevors
