= Ron Ouellette =

Canadian politician

Ronald Ouellette

Member of the New Brunswick Legislative Assembly for Grand Falls-Drummond-Saint-André Grand Falls Region (2003-2006)
- In office June 9, 2003 – September 27, 2010
- Preceded by: Jean-Guy Laforest
- Succeeded by: Danny Soucy

Personal details
- Party: Liberal

Ronald Ouellette is a politician in the province of New Brunswick, Canada. He was elected to the Legislative Assembly of New Brunswick in 2003 and re-elected in 2006.

== Early life ==
After receiving his Bachelor of Education from the Université de Moncton, he began his teaching career. For many years, he taught special needs children. He held various positions during his 31 years as an educator, including vice-principal at John Caldwell School, and department head at the Polyvalente Thomas-Albert.

His interest in politics began as a teen when he sat on the student council of Collège Saint-Louis/Maillet. He was selected as the New Brunswick representative at the Convention Internationale de la Francophonie in Africa in 1968. From 1984 to 1987, he served as a councillor, before becoming the mayor of Grand Falls (1987 to 1992). He sat on the industrial commission for 11 years, including two years as president. He became president of the urban planning commission in 1999.

== Political career ==
In his first term he represented the electoral district of Grand Falls Region, following which he represented the slightly altered district of Grand Falls-Drummond-Saint-André.

New Brunswick provincial government of Shawn Graham
Cabinet post (1)
Predecessor	Office	Successor
David Alward	Minister of Agriculture and Aquaculture; October 3, 2006–October 12, 2010 previously part of the responsibilities of the Minister of Agriculture, Fisheries and Aquaculture	Michael Olscamp
