= Ernie Steeves =

Canadian politician

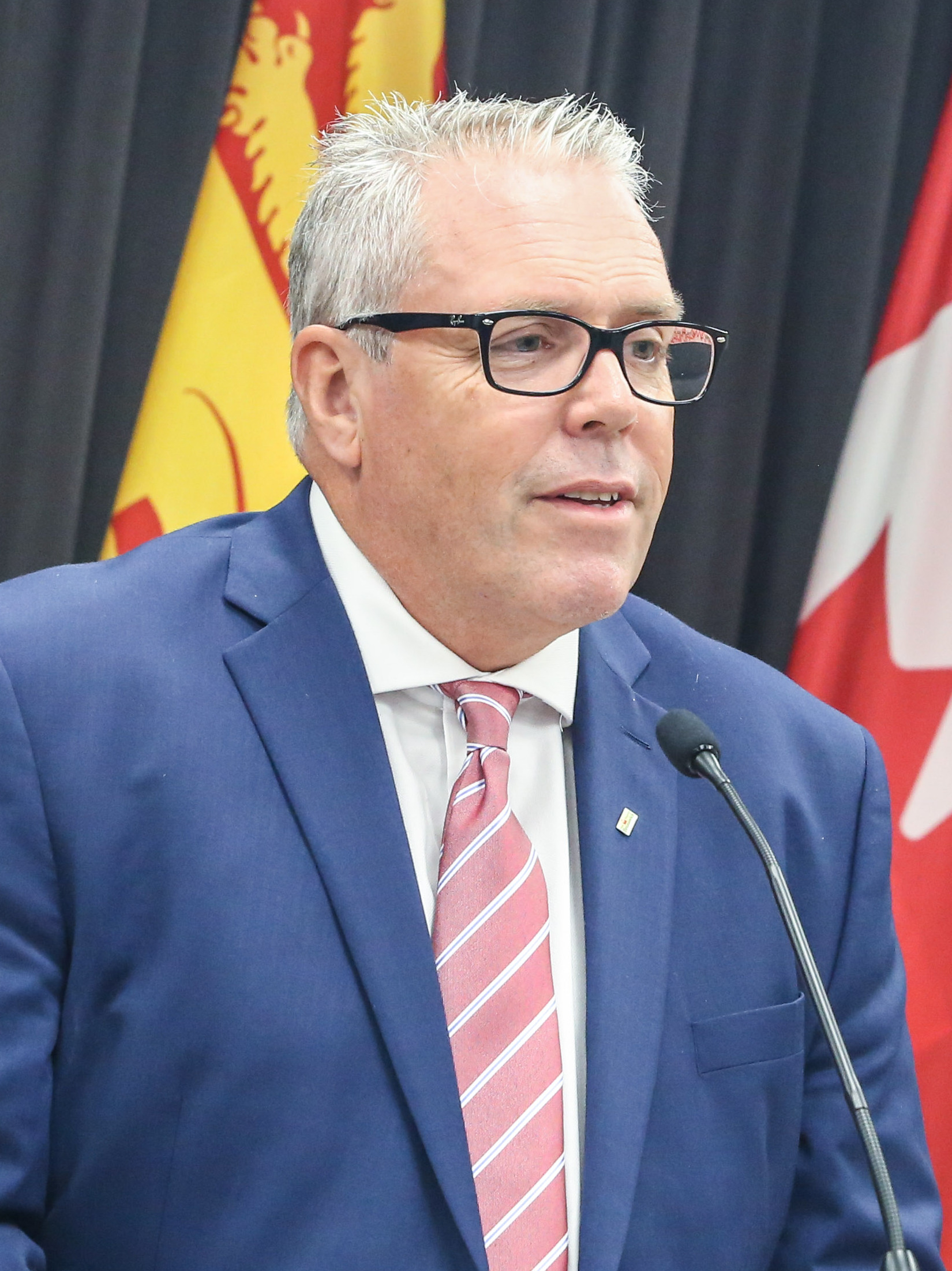
- Steeves in 2019

Minister of Finance
- In office November 9, 2018 – November 2, 2024
- Premier: Blaine Higgs
- Preceded by: Cathy Rogers
- Succeeded by: René Legacy

President of the Treasury Board
- In office November 9, 2018 – November 2, 2024
- Premier: Blaine Higgs
- Preceded by: Roger Melanson
- Succeeded by: René Legacy

Member of the New Brunswick Legislative Assembly for Moncton Northwest
- In office September 22, 2014 – September 19, 2024
- Preceded by: John Betts
- Succeeded by: Tania Sodhi

Personal details
- Born: Ernest Lawrence Steeves; February 12, 1961 (age 65) Fredericton, New Brunswick, Canada
- Party: Progressive Conservative

Ernest Lawrence Steeves (born February 12, 1961) is a retired Canadian politician who was elected to the Legislative Assembly of New Brunswick in the 2014 provincial election. He represented the electoral district of Moncton Northwest as a member of the Progressive Conservatives. He was re-elected in the 2018 and 2020 provincial elections.

While in opposition between 2014 and 2018, he was critic for Social Development, Seniors and Long Term Care. From 2018 until 2024, Steeves was Minister of Finance and Treasury Board in the Higgs government.

== Before politics ==
Before entering politics, Steeves was a radio broadcaster of 32 years. He worked on air at CFQM-FM (1982-1984), CHAM-AM, CKCW-AM, CFDR-AM, and CJMO-FM (1991-2014).

Steeves was a regular volunteer at Karing Kitchen, Moncton Headstart, the Friends of the Moncton Hospital, and the Canadian Cancer Society, and was a member of the Board of Directors for the Greater Moncton Football Association and Football New Brunswick. He was honorary chair for the Ride for Dad for prostate cancer. Steeves is a cancer survivor.

== Electoral record ==
=== Moncton Northwest ===
2024 New Brunswick general election: Moncton Northwest
Party	Candidate	Votes	%	±%
Liberal	Tania Sodhi	3,761	46.43	+14.5
Progressive Conservative	Ernie Steeves	3,536	43.65	-4.7
Green	Ana Santana	804	9.92	-0.6
Total valid votes		8,101	99.81	
Total rejected ballots		15	0.19	
Turnout		8,116	63.85	
Eligible voters		12,712		
Liberal gain from Progressive Conservative		Swing		+9.6
Source: Elections New Brunswick

2020 New Brunswick general election
Party	Candidate	Votes	%	±%
Progressive Conservative	Ernie Steeves	4,111	51.50	+10.43
Liberal	Mark Black	2,448	30.67	-7.53
Green	Laura Sanderson	702	8.79	+3.16
People's Alliance	Shawn Soucoup	493	6.18	-5.10
New Democratic	Cyprien Okana	229	2.87	-0.96
Total valid votes		7,983		
Total rejected ballots		4	0.05	-0.12
Turnout		7,987	63.86	+1.68
Eligible voters		12,508		
Progressive Conservative hold		Swing		+8.98
Source: Elections New Brunswick

2018 New Brunswick general election
Party	Candidate	Votes	%	±%
Progressive Conservative	Ernie Steeves	3,186	41.06	-1.09
Liberal	Courtney Pringle-Carver	2,963	38.19	-0.61
People's Alliance	Myrna Geldart	875	11.28	+9.29
Green	Keagan Slupsky	437	5.63	-0.47
New Democratic	Cyprien Okana	297	3.83	-7.13
Total valid votes		7,758	100.0	
Total rejected ballots		13	0.17	
Turnout		7,771	62.18	
Eligible voters		12,498		
Source: Elections New Brunswick

2014 New Brunswick general election
Party	Candidate	Votes	%	±%
Progressive Conservative	Ernie Steeves	3,012	42.15	-8.41
Liberal	Brian Hicks	2,773	38.80	+7.99
New Democratic	Jason Purdy	783	10.96	+1.18
Green	Mike Milligan	436	6.10	-2.74
People's Alliance	Carl Bainbridge	142	1.99	–
Total valid votes		7,146	100.0	
Total rejected ballots		25	0.35	
Turnout		7,171	59.57	
Eligible voters		12,038		
Progressive Conservative notional hold		Swing		-8.20
Source: Elections New Brunswick
