= Department of Environment (New Brunswick) =

Former department in New Brunswick

The Department of Environment was the Government of New Brunswick ministry charged with planning land use, zoning development and waste management as well as the enforcement of environmental legislation and regulations.

It was created in its current form on February 14, 2006 when it was separated from the Department of Environment and Local Government. It has however existed in this form on previous occasions.

It was first formed by Premier Richard Hatfield when he took office following the 1970 election. In 2000, then Premier Bernard Lord fused it with the Department of Municipalities to create the aforementioned Department of Environment and Local Government only to split them back in two six years later.

== Ministers ==
=== 1970 - 2000 ===
#	Minister	Term	Government
1.	G. W. N. Cockburn	November 12, 1970 - December 3, 1974	under Richard Hatfield
2.	Fernand Dube	December 3, 1974 - November 21, 1978	under Richard Hatfield
3.	Eric Kipping	November 21, 1978 - October 30, 1982	under Richard Hatfield
4.	C. W. Harmer	October 30, 1982 - October 3, 1985	under Richard Hatfield
5.	Robert Jackson	October 30, 1985 - October 27, 1987	under Richard Hatfield
6.	Vaughn Blaney	October 27, 1987 - October 9, 1991	under Frank McKenna
7.	Jane Barry	October 9, 1991 - April 25, 1994	under Frank McKenna
8.	Marcelle Mersereau	April 27, 1994 - September 26, 1995	under Frank McKenna
	Vaugh Blaney (2nd time)	September 26, 1995 - July 23, 1997	under Frank McKenna
9.	Joan Kingston	July 23, 1997 - October 13, 1997	under Frank McKenna
9.	Joan Kingston	October 13, 1997 - May 14, 1998	under Ray Frenette
10.	Gene Devereux	May 14, 1998 - June 21, 1999	under Camille Thériault
11.	Kim Jardine*	June 21, 1999 - March 23, 2000	under Bernard Lord

* Jardine became Minister of Environment and Local Government

=== 2000 - 2006 ===
See Department of Environment and Local Government (New Brunswick)

=== 2006 - 2012 ===
#	Minister	Term	Government
1.	Trevor Holder*	February 14, 2006 - October 3, 2006	under Bernard Lord
2.	Roland Haché	October 3, 2006 - October 12, 2010	under Shawn Graham
3.	Margaret-Ann Blaney	October 12, 2010 – March 15, 2012	under David Alward
Merged with Department of Local Government

* Holder previously served as Minister of Environment and Local Government

=== 2012 - 2020 ===
See Department of Environment and Local Government (New Brunswick)

=== 2020 - Present ===
#	Minister	Term	Government
1.	Gary Crossman	September 29, 2020 - Present	under Blaine Higgs
