= Emery Robichaud =

Canadian politician

MLA for Caraquet
- In office 1982–1987
- Preceded by: Onil Doiron
- Succeeded by: Bernard Thériault

Personal details
- Born: February 3, 1943 (age 83) Inkerman, New Brunswick
- Party: Progressive Conservative Party of New Brunswick
- Occupation: millwright

Oliver Emery Robichaud (born February 3, 1943) was a Canadian politician. He served in the Legislative Assembly of New Brunswick from 1982 to 1987, as a Progressive Conservative member for the constituency of Caraquet.
