= Onil Doiron =

Canadian politician

MLA for Caraquet
- In office 1974–1982
- Succeeded by: Emery Robichaud

Personal details
- Party: New Brunswick Liberal Association
- Occupation: Social coordinator

Onil Doiron was a Canadian politician. He served in the Legislative Assembly of New Brunswick from 1974 to 1982, as a Liberal member for the constituency of Caraquet.
