= Miramichi Centre =

Defunct provincial electoral district in New Brunswick, Canada

New Brunswick electoral district
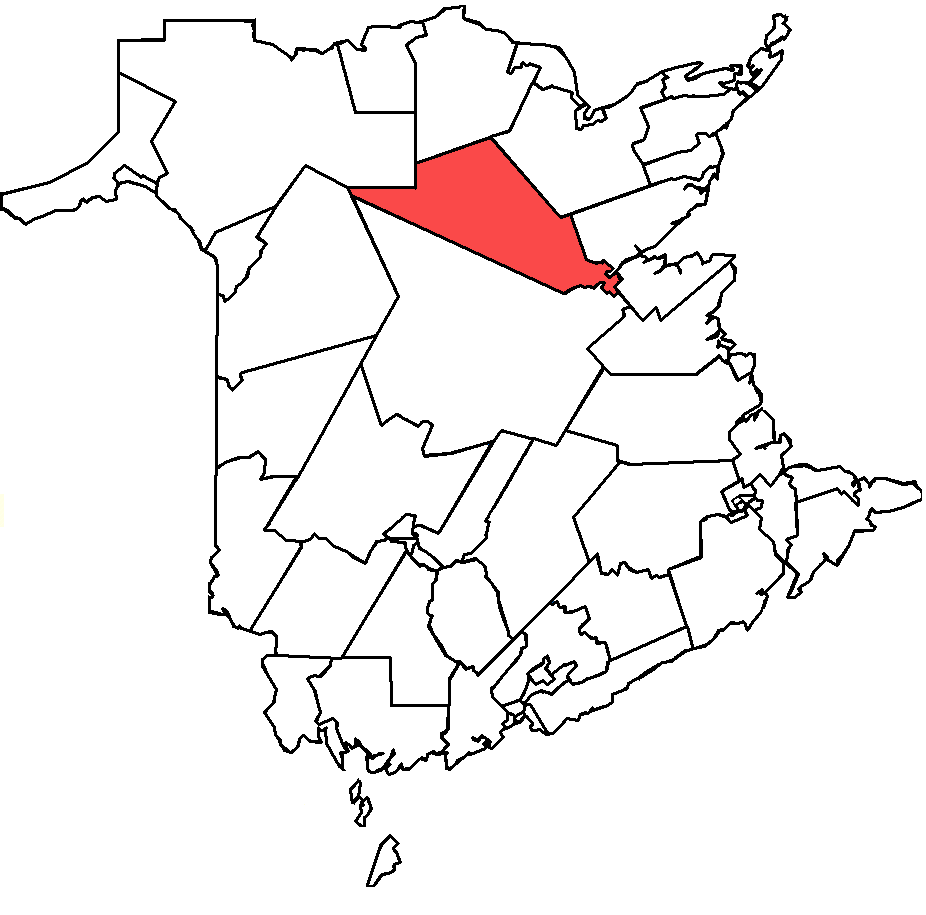
- Miramichi Centre in relation to other New Brunswick Provincial electoral districts
- Coordinates: 47.229°N 65.821°W

Defunct provincial electoral district
- Legislature: Legislative Assembly of New Brunswick
- District created: 1973
- District abolished: 2013
- First contested: 1974
- Last contested: 2010

Demographics
- Population (2006): 11,944
- Electors (2010): 8,990

Miramichi Centre was a provincial electoral district for the Legislative Assembly of New Brunswick, Canada. It was known as Miramichi-Newcastle from 1974 to 1995.

== Members of the Legislative Assembly ==
Assembly	Years	Member	Party
Miramichi-Newcastle; Riding created from Northumberland
48th	1974–1978	John McKay	Liberal
49th	1978–1982	John McKay	Liberal
50th	1982–1987	Paul Dawson	Progressive Conservative
51st	1987–1991	John McKay	Liberal
52nd	1991–1995	John McKay	Liberal
Miramichi Centre
53rd	1995–1999	John McKay	Liberal
54th	1999–2003	Kim Jardine	Progressive Conservative
55th	2003–2006	John Winston Foran	Liberal
56th	2006–2010	John Winston Foran	Liberal
57th	2010–2014	Robert Trevors	Progressive Conservative
Riding dissolved into Miramichi and Miramichi Bay-Neguac

== Election results ==
=== Miramichi Centre ===
2010 New Brunswick general election
Party	Candidate	Votes	%	±%
Progressive Conservative	Robert Trevors	3,183	48.08	+7.53
Liberal	John Winston Foran	2,561	38.69	-16.93
New Democratic	Douglas Mullin	379	5.73	+1.90
People's Alliance	Frances Connell	323	4.88	–
Green	Dylan Schneider	174	2.63	–
Total valid votes		6,620	100.0	
Total rejected ballots		59	0.88	
Turnout		6,679	74.29	
Eligible voters		8,990		
Progressive Conservative gain from Liberal		Swing		+12.23

2006 New Brunswick general election
Party	Candidate	Votes	%	±%
Liberal	John Winston Foran	3,747	55.62	+5.94
Progressive Conservative	George Smith	2,732	40.55	-1.02
New Democratic	Douglas T. Mullin	258	3.83	-4.92
Total valid votes		6,737	100.0	
Total rejected ballots		50	0.74	
Turnout		6,787	71.16	
Eligible voters		9,538		
Liberal notional hold		Swing		+3.48

2003 New Brunswick general election
Party	Candidate	Votes	%	±%
Liberal	John Winston Foran	3,763	49.68	+12.04
Progressive Conservative	Kim Jardine	3,149	41.57	-10.00
New Democratic	Lance Lyons	663	8.75	-2.04
Total valid votes		7,575	100.0	
Liberal gain from Progressive Conservative		Swing		+11.02

1999 New Brunswick general election
Party	Candidate	Votes	%	±%
Progressive Conservative	Kim Jardine	4,076	51.57	+5.40
Liberal	John McKay	2,975	37.64	-11.90
New Democratic	Terry Mullin	853	10.79	+6.50
Total valid votes		7,904	100.0	
Progressive Conservative gain from Liberal		Swing		+8.65

1995 New Brunswick general election
Party	Candidate	Votes	%	±%
Liberal	John McKay	4,081	49.54	+16.09
Progressive Conservative	Paul Dawson	3,803	46.17	+12.85
New Democratic	Terry Carter	353	4.29	+0.21
Total valid votes		8,237	100.0	
Liberal notional hold		Swing		+1.62

=== Miramichi-Newcastle ===
1991 New Brunswick general election
Party	Candidate	Votes	%	±%
Liberal	John McKay	2,583	33.45	-20.28
Progressive Conservative	Paul Dawson	2,573	33.32	-10.16
Confederation of Regions	Arch Pafford	2,252	29.16	–
New Democratic	Liane Thibodeau-Doucet	315	4.08	+1.29
Total valid votes		7,723	100.0	
Liberal hold		Swing		-5.06

1987 New Brunswick general election
Party	Candidate	Votes	%	±%
Liberal	John McKay	4,120	53.73	+12.29
Progressive Conservative	Paul Dawson	3,334	43.48	-4.52
New Democratic	Jeanne Theriault	214	2.79	-7.76
Total valid votes		7,668	100.0	
Liberal gain from Progressive Conservative		Swing		+8.40

1982 New Brunswick general election
Party	Candidate	Votes	%	±%
Progressive Conservative	Paul Dawson	3,461	48.00	-1.42
Liberal	John McKay	2,988	41.44	-9.14
New Democratic	Jerry Dunnett	761	10.55	–
Total valid votes		7,210	100.0	
Progressive Conservative gain from Liberal		Swing		+3.86

1978 New Brunswick general election
Party	Candidate	Votes	%	±%
Liberal	John McKay	3,200	50.58	+5.97
Progressive Conservative	Douglas R. Woods	3,127	49.42	+11.42
Total valid votes		6,327	100.0	
Liberal hold		Swing		-2.72

1974 New Brunswick general election
Party	Candidate	Votes	%
Liberal	John McKay	2,589	44.61
Progressive Conservative	Earle McKenna	2,205	38.00
New Democratic	Bill Whalen	1,009	17.39
Total valid votes		5,803	100.0
The previous multi-member riding of Northumberland went totally Liberal in the last election. None of the five incumbents ran in this riding.

== See also ==
- List of New Brunswick provincial electoral districts
- Canadian provincial electoral districts
