= George J. Jenkins =

Canadian politician (1927–2002)

Member of the New Brunswick Legislative Assembly for East Saint John
- In office September 23, 1991 – September 11, 1995
- Preceded by: Peter Trites
- Succeeded by: Roly MacIntyre

Personal details
- Born: June 4, 1927 Saint John, New Brunswick
- Died: February 15, 2002 (aged 74) Saint John, New Brunswick
- Party: Liberal
- Occupation: Educator

George J. Jenkins (June 4, 1927 – February 15, 2002) was a Canadian politician in the province of New Brunswick. He was elected to the Legislative Assembly of New Brunswick in 1991 and did not run for re-election.

Jenkins represented the electoral district of East Saint John. He died on February 15, 2002.
