= Department of Municipalities and Housing (New Brunswick) =

Part of the Government of New Brunswick, Canada

The Department of Municipalities and Housing was a part of the Government of New Brunswick. It was charged with the planning and supervision of local government and the development and administration of programs in support of affordable housing and home ownership in New Brunswick. This department took over the functions of the former Department of Municipalities, Culture and Housing in 1998. In 2000, the department's functions were transferred to the new departments of Environment and Local Government and Family and Community Services.

== Ministers ==
#	Minister	Term	Government
1.	Marcelle Mersereau	May 14, 1998 – June 21, 1999	under Camille Thériault
2.	Joan MacAlpine	June 21, 1999 – March 23, 2000	under Bernard Lord
