= Louis-Philippe McGraw =

Canadian politician

Member of the New Brunswick Legislative Assembly for Centre-Péninsule
- In office 1999–2003
- Preceded by: Denis Landry
- Succeeded by: Denis Landry

Personal details
- Born: October 26, 1971 (age 54) Sainte-Rose, New Brunswick, Canada
- Party: Progressive Conservative

Louis-Philippe McGraw (born October 26, 1971, in Sainte-Rose, New Brunswick) is a lawyer in the province of New Brunswick, Canada. He is a former member of the Legislative Assembly of New Brunswick, having served from 1999 to 2003. In 2008 he was appointed Commissioner and Vice-President of the National Parole Board.

McGraw studied at the University of Moncton, graduating with Bachelor of Business Administration, Bachelor of Laws, and Master of Business Administration degrees. He was admitted to the Bar of New Brunswick in 1997 and set up a law practice in Saint-Isidore.

Louis-Philippe McGraw began his involvement in politics as a Liberal and was youth chair of Bernard Richard's unsuccessful bid for the Liberal leadership in 1998. He joined the Progressive Conservative Party of New Brunswick and was elected to the 54th New Brunswick Legislative Assembly in 1999 to represent the electoral district of Centre-Péninsule.

He was defeated in a bid for re-election in 2003 by Denis Landry, whom McGraw had defeated in 1999. McGraw was defeated in a third rematch against Landry in the 2006 election.

From the 2006 federal election until the provincial campaign later that year, McGraw served as an advisor to federal cabinet minister Greg Thompson.

Preceded by Denis Landry (Liberal)	MLA for Centre-Péninsule; 1999–2003	Succeeded by Denis Landry (Liberal)
