= Peter Trites =

Canadian politician

Member of the Legislative Assembly of New Brunswick for East Saint John
- In office November 26, 1984 – September 23, 1991
- Preceded by: Gerald Merrithew
- Succeeded by: George J. Jenkins

Personal details
- Born: Peter Gerald Trites; December 17, 1946 Moncton, New Brunswick
- Died: May 13, 2010 (aged 63) Moncton, New Brunswick
- Party: New Brunswick Liberal Association (1987-2010)
- Other political affiliations: New Brunswick New Democratic Party (1984-1987)
- Profession: Teacher

Peter Gerald Trites (December 17, 1946 – May 13, 2010) was a former high school teacher and political figure in New Brunswick, Canada. He represented Saint John East in the Legislative Assembly of New Brunswick from 1984 to 1991 as a New Democratic Party and then Liberal member.

== Life and career ==
Peter Gerald Trites was born in Moncton, New Brunswick, the son of Gerald L. Trites and Elizabeth P. Campbell. He was educated at the University of New Brunswick. He was first elected to the provincial assembly as a member of the New Democratic Party in a 1984 by-election held after Gerald Merrithew resigned his seat to run for a seat in the House of Commons. He crossed the floor to sit as a Liberal prior to the 1987 election. Trites was named to the province's Executive Council as Minister of Housing in 1987. He declined to run for re-election in 1991.

Between 1968–1998, Trites was a high school teacher at Simonds High School. In 1992, Trites was elected to Saint John City Council as a city councillor and served in that regard until 2004. In 2005, CBC Radio found that Trites was working at an Old Navy store in Saint John.

== Personal life and death ==
Trites married Deborah Smith in 1973 and had two children. He died on May 13, 2010, at the Moncton City Hospital, aged 63. His funeral was held on May 17.
