= Grand Lake (electoral district) =

Defunct provincial electoral district in New Brunswick, Canada

New Brunswick electoral district

Defunct provincial electoral district
- Legislature: Legislative Assembly of New Brunswick
- District created: 1994
- District abolished: 2006
- First contested: 1995
- Last contested: 2003

Grand Lake was a provincial electoral district for the Legislative Assembly of New Brunswick, Canada.

== Members of the Legislative Assembly ==
Assembly	Years	Member	Party
Riding created from Queens North, Sunbury and Queens South
53rd	1995–1999	Doug Tyler	Liberal
54th	1999–2003	David Jordan	Progressive Conservative
55th	2003–2006	Eugene McGinley	Liberal
Riding dissolved into Grand Lake-Gagetown and Petitcodiac

== Election results ==
2003 New Brunswick general election
Party	Candidate	Votes	%	±%
Liberal	Eugene McGinley	4,376	62.09	+19.51
Progressive Conservative	David Jordan	2,058	29.20	-20.26
New Democratic	David Babineau	614	8.71	+3.67
Total valid votes		7,048	100.0	
Liberal gain from Progressive Conservative		Swing		+19.88

1999 New Brunswick general election
Party	Candidate	Votes	%	±%
Progressive Conservative	David Charles Jordan	3,769	49.46	+21.70
Liberal	Doug Tyler	3,245	42.58	-4.86
New Democratic	Phyllis MacLean	384	5.04	-0.32
Confederation of Regions	Murray C. Barton	223	2.93	-16.21
Total valid votes		7,621	100.0	
Progressive Conservative gain from Liberal		Swing		+13.28

1995 New Brunswick general election
Party	Candidate	Votes	%	±%
Liberal	Doug Tyler	3,743	47.44	
Progressive Conservative	Stephen McCready	2,177	27.76	
Confederation of Regions	Connie Webber	1,501	19.14	
New Democratic	Danny Young	420	5.36	
Total valid votes		7,841	100.0	
Liberal notional gain		Swing		

== See also ==
- List of New Brunswick provincial electoral districts
- Canadian provincial electoral districts
