= Grand Falls-Vallée-des-Rivières-Saint-Quentin =

Provincial electoral district in New Brunswick, Canada

New Brunswick electoral district
- The riding of Grand Falls-Vallée-des-Rivières-Saint-Quentin in relation to other New Brunswick electoral districts
- Coordinates: 47.182°N 66.744°W

Provincial electoral district
- Legislature: Legislative Assembly of New Brunswick
MLA
Chuck Chiasson
Liberal
- District created: 1973
- First contested: 1974
- Last contested: 2024

Demographics
- Population (2011): 15,518
- Electors (2013): 11,311
- Census division(s): Victoria, Madawaska

Grand Falls-Vallée-des-Rivières-Saint-Quentin (French: Grand-Sault-Vallée-des-Rivières-Saint-Quentin) is a provincial electoral district for the Legislative Assembly of New Brunswick, Canada.

== History ==
It was created in 1973 as Grand Falls. Though its boundaries were unchanged in 1994, the name was changed to Grand Falls Region to reflect the fact that the district included not only the Town of Grand Falls but also the communities of Drummond and Saint-André. The district underwent only slight boundary changes in 2006 but the name was again changed to the less unusual and more easily bilingual Grand Falls-Drummond-Saint-André.

In the 2013 redistribution the riding expanded significantly as it was nearly 30% underpopulated, and was renamed Victoria-La Vallée. It moved south taking in parts of Victoria County north of the Aroostook River and north taking in the areas around and including the Town of St-Leonard.

Following the 2023 redistribution, the riding was renamed Grand Falls-Vallée-des-Rivières-Saint-Quentin.

== Members of the Legislative Assembly ==
Assembly	Years	Member	Party
Grand Falls; Riding created from Victoria
48th	1974–1978	Everard Daigle	Liberal
49th	1978–1982	Everard Daigle	Liberal
50th	1982–1987	Everard Daigle	Liberal
51st	1987–1991	Paul Duffie	Liberal
52nd	1991–1995	Paul Duffie	Liberal
Grand Falls Region
53rd	1995–1999	Paul Duffie	Liberal
54th	1999–2003	Jean-Guy Laforest	Progressive Conservative
55th	2003–2006	Ronald Ouellette	Liberal
Grand Falls-Drummond-Saint-André
56th	2006–2010	Ronald Ouellette	Liberal
57th	2010–2014	Danny Soucy	Progressive Conservative
Victoria-La Vallée
58th	2014–2018	Chuck Chiasson	Liberal
59th	2018–2020	Chuck Chiasson	Liberal
60th	2020–2024	Chuck Chiasson	Liberal
Grand Falls-Vallée-des-Rivières-Saint-Quentin
61st	2024–Present	Chuck Chiasson	Liberal

== Election results ==
=== Grand Falls-Vallée-des-Rivières-Saint-Quentin ===
2024 New Brunswick general election
Party	Candidate	Votes	%	±%
Liberal	Chuck Chiasson	4,976	62.1%	
Progressive Conservative	Marc-André Ross	2,493	31.1%	
Green	Dani McLean-Godbout	540	6.7%	
Total valid votes				
Total rejected ballots				
Turnout		8,009	-	
Eligible voters		-		
Liberal hold		Swing		
Source: Elections New Brunswick

=== Victoria-La Vallée ===
2020 New Brunswick general election
Party	Candidate	Votes	%	±%
Liberal	Chuck Chiasson	4,365		
Progressive Conservative	Roland Michaud	2,071		
Green	Nathanaël Denis Lavoie	426		
People's Alliance	André Jobin	292		
Independent	Danny Zolondek	92		
Total valid votes		7,246	100.0	
Total rejected ballots				
Turnout				
Eligible voters				
Liberal hold		Swing		

2018 New Brunswick general election
Party	Candidate	Votes	%	±%
Liberal	Chuck Chiasson	3,570	47.24	-2.38
Progressive Conservative	Danny Soucy	3,212	42.50	+4.30
Green	Paul Plourde	468	6.19	+0.84
New Democratic	Lina Chiasson	307	4.06	-2.76
Total valid votes		7,557	99.54	
Total rejected ballots		35	0.46	-0.30
Turnout		7,592	66.65	-2.07
Eligible voters		11,391		
Liberal hold		Swing		-3.34

2014 New Brunswick general election
Party	Candidate	Votes	%	±%
Liberal	Chuck Chiasson	3,969	49.62	+6.04
Progressive Conservative	Danny Soucy	3,056	38.20	-10.96
New Democratic	Joe Bérubé	546	6.83	+2.13
Green	Daniel Zolondek	428	5.35	+2.79
Total valid votes		7,999	99.24	
Total rejected ballots		61	0.76	
Turnout		8,060	68.72	
Eligible voters		11,729		
Liberal notional gain from Progressive Conservative		Swing		+8.50

=== Grand Falls-Drummond-Saint André ===
2010 New Brunswick general election
Party	Candidate	Votes	%	±%
Progressive Conservative	Danny Soucy	3,057	49.16	+8.59
Liberal	Ronald Ouellette	2,710	43.58	-12.09
New Democratic	Maureen Michaud	292	4.70	+0.93
Green	Cecile Robitaille	159	2.56	–
Total valid votes		6,218	100.0	
Total rejected ballots		99	1.57	
Turnout		6,317	73.38	
Eligible voters		8,609		
Progressive Conservative gain from Liberal		Swing		+10.34

2006 New Brunswick general election
Party	Candidate	Votes	%	±%
Liberal	Ronald Ouellette	3,750	55.67	-5.98
Progressive Conservative	Maurice Picard	2,733	40.57	+4.92
New Democratic	Pierre Cyr	254	3.77	+1.07
Total valid votes		6,737	100.0	
Liberal notional hold		Swing		-5.45

=== Grand Falls Region ===
2003 New Brunswick general election
Party	Candidate	Votes	%	±%
Liberal	Ronald Ouellette	4,385	61.65	+16.50
Progressive Conservative	Jean-Guy Laforest	2,536	35.65	-15.33
New Democratic	Pierre Cyr	192	2.70	-1.17
Total valid votes		7,113	100.0	
Liberal gain from Progressive Conservative		Swing		+15.92

1999 New Brunswick general election
Party	Candidate	Votes	%	±%
Progressive Conservative	Jean-Guy Laforest	3,493	50.98	+18.79
Liberal	Marcel Deschênes	3,093	45.15	-18.97
New Democratic	Jean-Paul Gallant	265	3.87	+0.18
Total valid votes		6,851	100.0	
Progressive Conservative gain from Liberal		Swing		+18.88

1995 New Brunswick general election
Party	Candidate	Votes	%	±%
Liberal	Paul Duffie	4,583	64.12	-5.04
Progressive Conservative	Jean-Guy Laforest	2,301	32.19	+9.07
New Democratic	Jean-Paul Gallant	264	3.69	-0.27
Total valid votes		7,148	100.0	
Liberal hold		Swing		-7.06

=== Grand Falls ===
1991 New Brunswick general election
Party	Candidate	Votes	%	±%
Liberal	Paul Duffie	3,617	69.16	-8.00
Progressive Conservative	Léo R. Thériault	1,209	23.12	+4.47
New Democratic	Clyde Winchester	207	3.96	-0.23
Confederation of Regions	Roy Simon Dee	197	3.77	–
Total valid votes		5,230	100.0	
Liberal hold		Swing		-6.24

1987 New Brunswick general election
Party	Candidate	Votes	%	±%
Liberal	Paul E. Duffie	4,124	77.16	+18.13
Progressive Conservative	Réal Dionne	997	18.65	-19.40
New Democratic	Henri Soucy	224	4.19	+1.27
Total valid votes		5,345	100.0	
Liberal hold		Swing		+18.76

1982 New Brunswick general election
Party	Candidate	Votes	%	±%
Liberal	Everard H. Daigle	3,129	59.03	-3.24
Progressive Conservative	Bessie Cote	2,017	38.05	+14.23
New Democratic	Patricia Morrell	155	2.92	-10.99
Total valid votes		5,301	100.0	
Liberal hold		Swing		-8.74

1978 New Brunswick general election
Party	Candidate	Votes	%	±%
Liberal	Everard H. Daigle	2,779	62.27	+1.58
Progressive Conservative	Joseph H. Rideout	1,063	23.82	-15.49
New Democratic	Guildoi Pelletier	621	13.91	–
Total valid votes		4,463	100.0	
Liberal hold		Swing		+8.54

1974 New Brunswick general election
Party	Candidate	Votes	%
Liberal	Everard H. Daigle	2,561	60.69
Progressive Conservative	Leo D. Levesque	1,659	39.31
Total valid votes		4,220	100.0
The previous riding of Victoria went totally Progressive Conservative in the last election, with neither of the two incumbents running in this election.

== See also ==
- List of New Brunswick provincial electoral districts
- Canadian provincial electoral districts
