= Isabelle Thériault =

Canadian politician

Isabelle Thériault MLA

Minister of Tourism, Heritage and Culture
- Incumbent
- Assumed office November 2, 2024
- Premier: Susan Holt
- Preceded by: Tammy Scott-Wallace

Member of the New Brunswick Legislative Assembly for Caraquet
- Incumbent
- Assumed office September 24, 2018
- Preceded by: Hédard Albert

Personal details
- Born: Lamèque, New Brunswick
- Party: Liberal

Isabelle Thériault is a Canadian politician, who was elected to the Legislative Assembly of New Brunswick in the 2018 election. She represents the electoral district of Caraquet as a member of the Liberal Party. She was re-elected in the 2020 provincial election, and again in the 2024 general election where she was appointed Minister of Tourism, Heritage and Culture.

Before entering politics, Thériault spent nearly 15 years touring across Canada, the United States, Europe, Asia, and Africa as a professional musician and musical director for the ensembles Ode à l’Acadie, Les Muses, and DRUM. She directed several large-scale events for national television.

Thériault founded the summer bistro La Brôkerie in Caraquet, served as artistic director of the Festival acadien de Caraquet, and has received awards for her contributions to music and culture, including Éloizes, Musique NB Awards, an East Coast Music Award, and Acadian Peninsula Entrepreneur of the Year.

== Personal life ==
She is married to Serge Cormier, Liberal MP for Acadie—Bathurst.

== Electoral record ==
2024 New Brunswick general election: Caraquet
Party	Candidate	Votes	%	±%
Liberal	Isabelle Thériault	6,002		
Progressive Conservative	Jean Paul Lanteigne	719		
Total valid votes		6,021	100.00	
Total rejected ballots				
Turnout				
Eligible voters				
Liberal hold		Swing		
Source: Elections New Brunswick

2020 New Brunswick general election
Party	Candidate	Votes	%	±%
Liberal	Isabelle Thériault	5,928	72.27	+8.49
Green	Marie-Christine Haché	1,290	15.73	+11.84
Progressive Conservative	Kevin Haché	985	12.01	-9.49
Total valid votes		8,203	100.00	
Total rejected ballots		64	0.77	+0.28
Turnout		8,267	75.65	-1.44
Eligible voters		10,928		
Liberal hold		Swing		-1.68
Source: Elections New Brunswick

2018 New Brunswick general election
Party	Candidate	Votes	%	±%
Liberal	Isabelle Thériault	5,420	63.78	+6.96
Progressive Conservative	Kevin Haché	1,827	21.50	-0.36
New Democratic	Katy Casavant	548	6.45	-12.58
Independent	Guilmond Hébert	373	4.39	
Green	Yvon Durelle	330	3.88	+1.58
Total valid votes		8,498	99.51	
Total rejected ballots		42	0.49	-0.06
Turnout		8,540	78.12	+3.18
Eligible voters		10,932		
Liberal hold		Swing		+3.66
