= Saint John East =

Provincial electoral district in New Brunswick, Canada

Coordinates: 45.237°N 65.988°W

New Brunswick electoral district
- The riding of Saint John East (as it exists from 2023) in relation to other New Brunswick electoral districts

Provincial electoral district
- Legislature: Legislative Assembly of New Brunswick
MLA
Glen Savoie
Progressive Conservative
- District created: 1973
- First contested: 1974
- Last contested: 2024

Demographics
- Population (2011): 14,579
- Electors (2013): 11,212
- Census division: Saint John County, New Brunswick
- Census subdivision: Saint John

Saint John East (French: Saint-Jean-Est) is a provincial electoral district for the Legislative Assembly of New Brunswick, Canada.

The riding was created in the 1973 redistribution and was called East Saint John. The riding was created from the two member district of Saint John East, which was divided into this riding and Saint John-Fundy. Under the 1994 redistribution the riding was largely unchanged, losing some territory to Saint John-Fundy while gaining other small parts from Saint John-2Fundy and Saint John Park. It was renamed Saint John Champlain as parts of the City of Saint John known locally as East Saint John had been moved out of the district. In 2006, the district boundaries were again changed, losing some territory to adjacent districts but taking in all of what is known as East Saint John; as a result, its name was changed to Saint John East. At the 2013 redistribution, the riding was altered significantly with nearly half of its population moving to the north to join Saint John Portland, being replaced by territory gained from the abolished district of Saint John-Fundy.

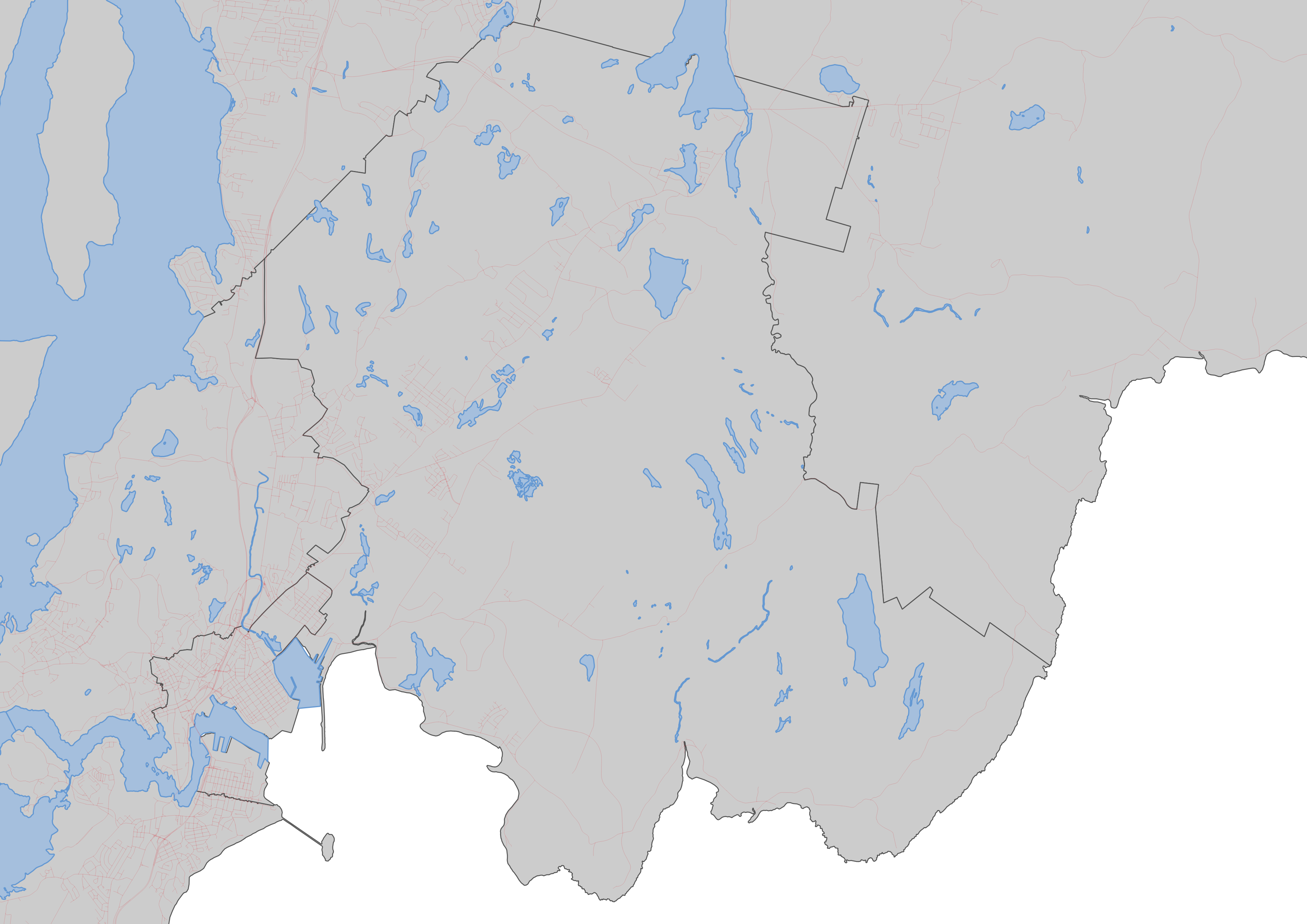
Saint John East (as it exists from 2023) and the roads in the riding

== Members of the Legislative Assembly ==
Assembly	Years	Member	Party
East Saint John; Riding created from Saint John East (1967–1974)
48th	1974–1978	Gerald Merrithew	Progressive Conservative
49th	1978–1982	Gerald Merrithew	Progressive Conservative
50th	1982–1984	Gerald Merrithew	Progressive Conservative
50th	1984–1987	Peter Trites	New Democratic
51st	1987–1991	Peter Trites	Liberal
52nd	1991–1995	George Jenkins	Liberal
Saint John Champlain
53rd	1995–1999	Roly MacIntyre	Liberal
54th	1999–2003	Carole Keddy	Progressive Conservative
55th	2003–2006	Roly MacIntyre	Liberal
Saint John East
56th	2006–2010	Roly MacIntyre	Liberal
57th	2010–2014	Glen Tait	Progressive Conservative
58th	2014–2014	Gary Keating	Liberal
58th	2014–2018	Glen Savoie	Progressive Conservative
59th	2018–2020	Glen Savoie	Progressive Conservative
60th	2020–2024	Glen Savoie	Progressive Conservative
61st	2024–Present	Glen Savoie	Progressive Conservative

Gary Keating resigned on October 14, 2014, just 22 days after being elected. Keating was never sworn in.

== Election results ==
=== Saint John East, 2024–present ===
2024 New Brunswick general election
Party	Candidate	Votes	%	±%
Progressive Conservative	Glen Savoie	3,181	43.6	-11.9
Liberal	David Alston	3,147	43.1	+17.9
Green	Gerald Irish	514	7.0	-0.7
New Democratic	Josh Floyd	252	3.5	-0.1
People's Alliance	Tanya Graham	118	1.6	-6.1
Libertarian	Denise Campbell	92	1.3	New
Total valid votes		7,304		
Total rejected ballots				
Turnout				
Eligible voters				
Source: Elections New Brunswick

2020 provincial election redistributed results
Party	%
Progressive Conservative	55.5
Liberal	25.2
Green	7.7
People's Alliance	7.7
New Democratic	3.6

=== Saint John East, 2014–2024 ===
2020 New Brunswick general election
Party	Candidate	Votes	%	±%
Progressive Conservative	Glen Savoie	3,507	56.36	+10.75
Liberal	Phil Comeau	1,639	26.34	-0.50
People's Alliance	Patrick Kemp	434	6.98	-8.85
Green	Gerald Irish	394	6.33	+0.69
New Democratic	Josh Floyd	248	3.99	-2.09
Total valid votes		6,222	99.87	
Total rejected ballots		8	0.13	-0.07
Turnout		6,230	55.18	-3.19
Eligible voters		11,291		
Progressive Conservative hold		Swing		+5.62
Source: Elections New Brunswick

2018 New Brunswick general election
Party	Candidate	Votes	%	±%
Progressive Conservative	Glen Savoie	3,017	45.62	+1.31
Liberal	Clare Manzer	1,775	26.84	-1.00
People's Alliance	Matthew Thompson	1,047	15.83	+15.07
New Democratic	Alex White	402	6.08	-15.80
Green	Lynaya Astephen	373	5.64	+0.42
Total valid votes		6,614	99.80	
Total rejected ballots		13	0.20	
Turnout		6,627	58.36	
Eligible voters		11,355		
Source: Elections New Brunswick

New Brunswick provincial by-election, 17 November 2014
Party	Candidate	Votes	%	±%
Progressive Conservative	Glen Savoie	2,225	44.31	+7.43
Liberal	Shelley Rinehart	1,398	27.84	-9.18
New Democratic	Dominic Cardy	1,099	21.88	+3.36
Green	Sharon Murphy	262	5.22	-0.39
People's Alliance	Arthur Watson	38	0.76	-1.21
Total valid votes		5,022	100.00	
Total rejected ballots		11	0.22	
Turnout		5,033	43.67	
Eligible voters		11,526		
Progressive Conservative gain from Liberal		Swing		+8.31
Source: Elections New Brunswick

2014 New Brunswick general election
Party	Candidate	Votes	%	±%
Liberal	Gary Keating	2,332	37.02	+3.93
Progressive Conservative	Glen Savoie	2,323	36.88	-0.98
New Democratic	Phil Comeau	1,167	18.53	-5.14
Green	Sharon Murphy	353	5.60	+0.23
People's Alliance	Jason Inness	124	1.97	
Total valid votes		6,299	100.0	
Total rejected ballots		26	0.41	
Turnout		6,325	54.88	
Eligible voters		11,526		
Liberal notional gain from Progressive Conservative		Swing		+2.46
Voting results declared after judicial recount.
Source: Elections New Brunswick

=== Saint John East, 2006–2010 ===
2010 New Brunswick general election
Party	Candidate	Votes	%	±%
Progressive Conservative	Glen Tait	2,135	37.86	+5.00
Liberal	Kevin McCarville	1,866	33.09	-27.09
New Democratic	Sandy Harding	1,335	23.67	+16.71
Green	Ann McAllister	303	5.37	–
Total valid votes		5,639	100.0	
Total rejected ballots		21	0.37	
Turnout		5,660	54.66	
Eligible voters		10,354		
Progressive Conservative gain from Liberal		Swing		+16.04
Source: Elections New Brunswick

2006 New Brunswick general election
Party	Candidate	Votes	%	±%
Liberal	Roly MacIntyre	3,406	60.18	+20.11
Progressive Conservative	Joe Mott	1,860	32.86	+5.02
New Democratic	Maureen Michaud	394	6.96	-20.99
Total valid votes		5,660	100.0	
Liberal hold		Swing		+7.27
Source: Elections New Brunswick

=== Saint John Champlain, 1994–2003 ===
2003 New Brunswick general election
Party	Candidate	Votes	%	±%
Liberal	Roly MacIntyre	2,160	40.07	+6.19
New Democratic	Ralph Thomas	1,507	27.95	+0.19
Progressive Conservative	Mel Vincent Jr.	1,501	27.84	-8.19
Grey	Bill Richard Reid	223	4.14	–
Total valid votes		5,391	100.0	
Liberal gain from Progressive Conservative		Swing		+3.00
Source: Elections New Brunswick

1999 New Brunswick general election
Party	Candidate	Votes	%	±%
Progressive Conservative	Carole Keddy	2,073	36.03	+9.62
Liberal	Roly MacIntyre	1,949	33.88	-4.06
New Democratic	Dr. Paula C. Tippett	1,597	27.76	-4.47
Confederation of Regions	Dolores H. Cook	98	1.70	-1.71
Natural Law	Jeanne Geldart	36	0.63	–
Total valid votes		5,753	100.0	
Progressive Conservative gain from Liberal		Swing		+6.84
Source: Elections New Brunswick

1995 New Brunswick general election
Party	Candidate	Votes	%	±%
Liberal	Roly MacIntyre	2,222	37.94	+5.79
New Democratic	Paula Tippett	1,888	32.23	+10.67
Progressive Conservative	Lisa Keenan	1,547	26.41	+10.71
Confederation of Regions	Christina Green	200	3.41	-27.18
Total valid votes		5,857	100.0	
Liberal hold		Swing		-2.44
Source: Elections New Brunswick

=== East Saint John ===
1991 New Brunswick general election
Party	Candidate	Votes	%	±%
Liberal	George J. Jenkins	2,785	32.15	-8.99
Confederation of Regions	Gary Ewart	2,650	30.59	–
New Democratic	Ben Donaldson	1,868	21.56	-11.12
Progressive Conservative	Don Elliott	1,360	15.70	-3.38
Total valid votes		8,663	100.0	
Liberal hold		Swing		-19.79
Source: Elections New Brunswick

1987 New Brunswick general election
Party	Candidate	Votes	%	±%
Liberal	Peter Trites	3,746	41.14	+17.49
New Democratic	Ervan Cronk	2,976	32.68	-8.28
Progressive Conservative	Gary William Woodroffe	1,737	19.08	-16.32
Independent	Dolores H. Cook	375	4.12	–
Independent	Frank Brown	272	2.99	–
Total valid votes		9,106	100.0	
Liberal gain from New Democratic		Swing		+12.88
Liberal candidate Peter Trites gained 0.18 percentage points from his performance in the 1985 by-election, when he ran as a New Democrat.
Source: Elections New Brunswick

New Brunswick provincial by-election, 1985
Party	Candidate	Votes	%	±%
New Democratic	Peter Trites	2,615	40.96	+15.52
Progressive Conservative	Wayne Ferguson	2,260	35.40	-12.53
Liberal	Marlene Anne Vaughan	1,510	23.65	-2.98
Total valid votes		6,385	100.0	
New Democratic gain from Progressive Conservative		Swing		+14.02
Source: Elections New Brunswick

1982 New Brunswick general election
Party	Candidate	Votes	%	±%
Progressive Conservative	G.S. "Gerry" Merrithew	4,246	47.93	-3.95
Liberal	Brian Fraser Hurley	2,359	26.63	-5.13
New Democratic	Peter Trites	2,254	25.44	+9.09
Total valid votes		8,859	100.0	
Progressive Conservative hold		Swing		+0.59
Source: Elections New Brunswick

1978 New Brunswick general election
Party	Candidate	Votes	%	±%
Progressive Conservative	G. S. "Gerry" Merrithew	3,626	51.88	+0.23
Liberal	George Creary	2,220	31.76	-12.68
New Democratic	Douglas Justason	1,143	16.35	+12.44
Total valid votes		6,989	100.0	
Progressive Conservative hold		Swing		+6.46
Source: Elections New Brunswick

1974 New Brunswick general election
Party	Candidate	Votes	%
Progressive Conservative	G.S. Merrithew	3,537	51.65
Liberal	Robert N. Fry	3,043	44.44
New Democratic	Terrence Parsons	268	3.91
Total valid votes		6,848	100.0
The previous multi-member riding of Saint John East went totally Progressive Conservative in the last election. Gerald Merrithew was one of two incumbents.
Source: Elections New Brunswick

== See also ==
- List of New Brunswick provincial electoral districts
- Canadian provincial electoral districts
