= Robert Trevors =

Canadian politician

Minister of Human Resources
- In office September 23, 2013 – October 7, 2014
- Premier: David Alward
- Preceded by: Troy Lifford
- Succeeded by: Denis Landry

Minister of Public Safety
- In office October 12, 2010 – September 23, 2013
- Premier: David Alward
- Preceded by: John Foran
- Succeeded by: Bruce Northrup

Member of the New Brunswick Legislative Assembly for Miramichi Centre
- In office September 27, 2010 – September 22, 2014
- Preceded by: John Foran
- Succeeded by: Bill Fraser

Personal details
- Party: Progressive Conservative

Robert Trevors is a Canadian politician who was elected to the Legislative Assembly of New Brunswick in the 2010 provincial election. He represented the electoral district of Miramichi Centre as a member of the Progressive Conservatives until the 2014 election, when he was defeated by Bill Fraser in the redistributed riding of Miramichi.
