= Chuck Chiasson =

Canadian politician

Chuck Chiasson MLA

Minister of Transportation and Infrastructure
- Incumbent
- Assumed office November 2, 2024
- Premier: Susan Holt
- Preceded by: Richard Ames

Member of the New Brunswick Legislative Assembly for Grand Falls-Vallée-des-Rivières-Saint-Quentin (since 2024) Victoria-la-Vallée (2014-2024)
- Incumbent
- Assumed office September 22, 2014
- Preceded by: Danny Soucy

Personal details
- Born: 1958 (age 67–68)
- Party: Liberal

Chuck Chiasson (born 1958) is a Canadian politician, who was elected to the Legislative Assembly of New Brunswick in the 2014 provincial election. He represents the electoral district of Victoria-la-Vallée as a member of the Liberal Party.

Chiasson was named to the Select Committee on Cannabis, pursuant to Motion 31 of the 3rd session of the 58th New Brunswick Legislature.

Chiasson was re-elected in the 2018 and 2020 provincial elections.

As of September 8, 2024, he serves as the Official Opposition critic for Post-Secondary Education, Training and Labour.

In the 2024 general election, Chiasson was re-elected in the newly renamed seat of Grand Falls-Vallée-des-Rivières-Saint-Quentin. On November 1, 2024, it was announced that he was placed on the cabinet as Minister of Transportation and Infrastructure.

== Personal life ==
In 2021, Chiasson had surgery after suffering a heart attack.

== Electoral record ==
=== Grand Falls-Vallée-des-Rivières-Saint-Quentin ===
2024 New Brunswick general election: Grand Falls-Vallée-des-Rivières-Saint-Quentin
Party	Candidate	Votes	%	±%
Liberal	Chuck Chiasson	4,976	62.1%	
Progressive Conservative	Marc-André Ross	2,493	31.1%	
Green	Dani McLean-Godbout	540	6.7%	
Total valid votes				
Total rejected ballots				
Turnout		8,009	-	
Eligible voters		-		
Liberal hold		Swing		
Source: Elections New Brunswick

=== Victoria-La Vallée ===
2020 New Brunswick general election
Party	Candidate	Votes	%	±%
Liberal	Chuck Chiasson	4,365		
Progressive Conservative	Roland Michaud	2,071		
Green	Nathanaël Denis Lavoie	426		
People's Alliance	André Jobin	292		
Independent	Danny Zolondek	92		
Total valid votes		7,246	100.0	
Total rejected ballots				
Turnout				
Eligible voters				
Liberal hold		Swing		

2018 New Brunswick general election
Party	Candidate	Votes	%	±%
Liberal	Chuck Chiasson	3,570	47.24	-2.38
Progressive Conservative	Danny Soucy	3,212	42.50	+4.30
Green	Paul Plourde	468	6.19	+0.84
New Democratic	Lina Chiasson	307	4.06	-2.76
Total valid votes		7,557	100.0	
Total rejected ballots		35	0.46	-0.30
Turnout		7,592	66.65	-2.07
Eligible voters		11,391		
Liberal hold		Swing		-3.34

2014 New Brunswick general election
Party	Candidate	Votes	%	±%
Liberal	Chuck Chiasson	3,969	49.62%	+6.04
Progressive Conservative	Danny Soucy	3,056	38.20%	-10.96
New Democratic	Joe Bérubé	546	6.83%	+2.13
Green	Daniel Zolondek	428	5.35%	+2.79
Total valid votes		7,999	100.0%	
Total rejected ballots		61	0.76	
Turnout		8,060	68.98%	
Eligible voters		11,685		
Liberal notional gain from Progressive Conservative		Swing		+8.50
