= Denis Landry =

Canadian politician

Mayor of Hautes-Terres
- Incumbent
- Assumed office January 1, 2023
- Preceded by: Position created

Leader of the Opposition (New Brunswick)
- In office February 14, 2019 – September 28, 2020
- Preceded by: Brian Gallant
- Succeeded by: Roger Melanson

Leader of the New Brunswick Liberal Association
- Interim
- In office February 12, 2019 – April 24, 2019
- Preceded by: Brian Gallant
- Succeeded by: Kevin Vickers
New Brunswick Executive Council
Minister of Transportation and Infrastructure
In office October 5, 2018 – November 9, 2018
Premier	Brian Gallant
Preceded by	Bill Fraser
Succeeded by	Bill Oliver
Minister of Public Safety and Justice
In office June 6, 2016 – November 9, 2018
Premier	Brian Gallant
Preceded by	Stephen Horsman
Succeeded by	Andrea Anderson-Mason (Justice); Carl Urquhart (Public Safety)
Minister of Natural Resources
In office October 7, 2014 – June 6, 2016
Premier	Brian Gallant
Preceded by	Paul Robichaud
Succeeded by	Rick Doucet (Energy and Resource Development)
Minister of Human Resources
In office October 7, 2014 – June 6, 2016
Premier	Brian Gallant
Preceded by	Robert Trevors
Succeeded by	Roger Melanson
Minister of Transportation
In office October 3, 2006 – October 12, 2010
Premier	Shawn Graham
Preceded by	Paul Robichaud
Succeeded by	Claude Williams
Parliamentary constituencies
Member of the New Brunswick Legislative Assembly for Bathurst East-Nepisiguit-Saint-Isidore (Centre-Péninsule-Saint-Sauveur; 1995–2014)
In office June 9, 2003 – November 27, 2022
Preceded by	Louis-Philippe McGraw
Succeeded by	Susan Holt
In office September 11, 1995 – June 7, 1999
Preceded by	Riding established
Succeeded by	Louis-Philippe McGraw

Personal details
- Born: November 13, 1957 (age 68) Val-Doucet, New Brunswick, Canada
- Party: Liberal Association

Denis Landry (born November 13, 1957) is the Mayor of Hautes-Terres and a former MLA and Leader of the Opposition in the province of New Brunswick, Canada. Landry was a Cabinet Minister in the governments of Shawn Graham and Brian Gallant.

== Background ==
Landry was born in Val-Doucet, New Brunswick and was educated at the Memramcook Institute, St. Francis Xavier University and the Université de Moncton. He was a logger for 17 years before working for the Canadian Paperworkers Union as local secretary-treasurer and later local president. He has served as President of the Acadian Peninsula Labour Council and president of the coalition against changes in unemployment insurance, a coalition composed of 15 different organizations. Landry later became a sales representative at a car dealership.

== Politics ==
Landry was elected to the Legislative Assembly of New Brunswick in 1995 and re-elected in 2003, 2006, 2010, 2014, 2018, and 2020. He was defeated in his first bid for re-election in 1999.

Landry was Minister of Justice in the government of Brian Gallant from 2016 until the Liberals lost power in 2018. He served in other cabinet roles since beginning of the Gallant administration in 2014.

Landry was chosen interim leader of the Liberal Party of New Brunswick on February 12, 2019, following the resignation of Brian Gallant.

Landry represented during the 57th Legislative Assembly the electoral district of Centre-Péninsule-Saint-Sauveur, though prior to the 2006 election the district was known simply as Centre-Péninsule.

Landry won re-election to the 58th Legislative Assembly in the Bathurst East-Nepisiguit-Saint-Isidore riding. He resigned on November 27, 2022.

Landry was elected mayor of the new municipality of Hautes-Terres by acclamation in the 2022 New Brunswick municipal elections.

New Brunswick provincial government of Shawn Graham
Cabinet post (1)
Predecessor	Office	Successor
Paul Robichaud	Minister of Transportation; 2006–2010	Claude Williams
