= Department of Municipalities, Culture and Housing (New Brunswick) =

The Department of Municipalities, Culture and Housing was a part of the Government of New Brunswick. It was charged with the planning and supervision of local government and the development and administration of programs in support of affordable housing, home ownership and the enhancement of community life in New Brunswick. This department took over the functions of the former Department of Municipal Affairs in 1991. In 1998, most of the department's functions were transferred to the new Department of Municipalities and Housing.

== Ministers ==
#	Minister	Term	Government
1.	Marcelle Mersereau	October 9, 1991 – April 27, 1994	under Frank McKenna
2.	Paul Duffie	April 27, 1994 – September 26, 1995	under Frank McKenna
3.	Ann Breault	September 26, 1995 – October 13, 1997	under Frank McKenna
	Ann Breault (cont.)	October 13, 1997 – May 14, 1998	under Ray Frenette
