= Tania Sodhi =

Provincial politician from New Brunswick

Tania Sodhi MLA

Member of the New Brunswick Legislative Assembly for Moncton Northwest
- Incumbent
- Assumed office October 21, 2024
- Preceded by: Ernie Steeves

Personal details
- Party: Liberal
- Children: 2
- Occupation: Lawyer and realtor

Tania Sodhi is a Indo-Canadian realtor and former lawyer who resides in Moncton, New Brunswick. She was elected to the Legislative Assembly of New Brunswick in the 2024 election for the riding of Moncton Northwest.

Sodhi is originally from Patiala, a city in Punjab, India. Before immigrating to Canada in 2018, she practised law in India. Sodhi works as a realtor in the Moncton area. A mother of two young girls, she also manages a local day care. Sodhi is the first visible minority elected to the Legislative Assembly of New Brunswick and the second person of South-Asian descent elected to a legislature from an Atlantic province.

== Electoral record ==
2024 New Brunswick general election: Moncton Northwest
Party	Candidate	Votes	%	±%
Liberal	Tania Sodhi	3,761	46.43	+14.5
Progressive Conservative	Ernie Steeves	3,536	43.65	-4.7
Green	Ana Santana	804	9.92	-0.6
Total valid votes		8,101	99.81	
Total rejected ballots		15	0.19	
Turnout		8,116	63.85	
Eligible voters		12,712		
Liberal gain from Progressive Conservative		Swing		+9.6
Source: Elections New Brunswick
