= Glen Tait =

Canadian politician

MLA for Saint John East
- In office October 12, 2010 – 2014
- Preceded by: Roly MacIntyre
- Succeeded by: Gary Keating

Personal details
- Party: Progressive Conservative

Glen Tait is a Canadian politician, who was elected to the Legislative Assembly of New Brunswick in the 2010 provincial election. He represented the electoral district of Saint John East as a member of the Progressive Conservatives until the 2014 provincial election, when he did not run for reelection to another term in office.

Tait is a former Saint John City Councillor.
