= Moncton Northwest (electoral district) =

Provincial electoral district in New Brunswick, Canada

New Brunswick electoral district
- The riding of Moncton Northwest (as it exists from 2023) in relation to other New Brunswick electoral districts
- Coordinates: 46.207°N 64.894°W

Provincial electoral district
- Legislature: Legislative Assembly of New Brunswick
MLA
Tania Sodhi
Liberal
- District created: 1994
- First contested: 1995
- Last contested: 2024

Demographics
- Population (2011): 15,669
- Electors (2013): 11,067
- Census division: Westmorland
- Census subdivision: Moncton

Moncton Northwest (French: Moncton-Nord-Ouest) is a provincial electoral district for the Legislative Assembly of New Brunswick, Canada. It was first be contested in the 1995 general election, having been created in the 1994 redistribution of electoral boundaries with the name Moncton Crescent.

The district was first created in 1995 out of Petitcodiac, then the most populous electoral district in the province. It took its name from the fact that its shape was a crescent over the north of the city of Moncton. It lost much of its easternmost territory in the 2006 redistribution and lost much of its crescent shape. It lost more territory in 2013 but gained parts of Petitcodiac and was renamed Moncton Northwest.

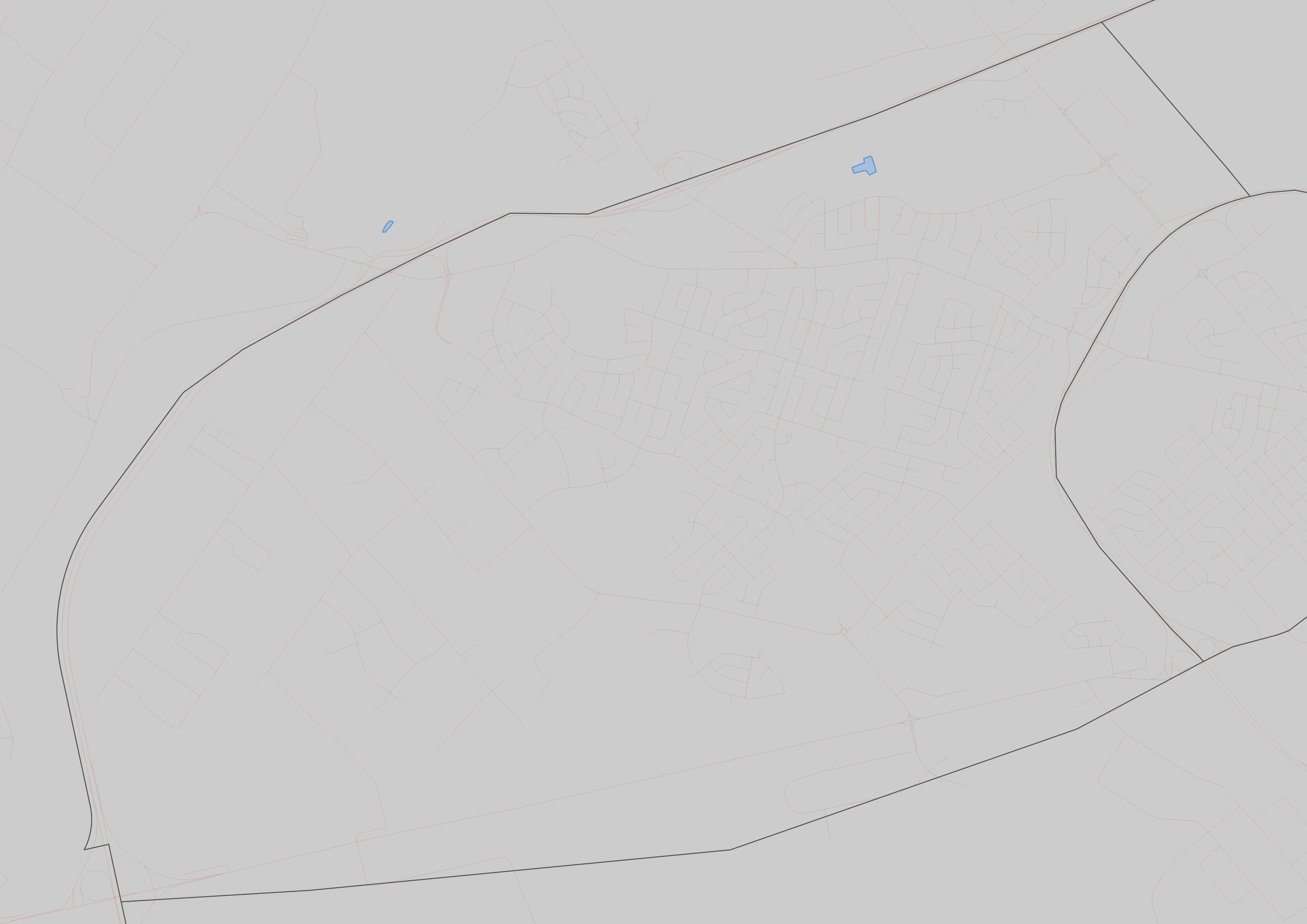
Moncton Northwest (as it exists from 2023) and the roads in the riding

== Members of the Legislative Assembly ==
| Assembly | Years | Member | Party |
|---|---|---|---|
Moncton Crescent; Riding created from Petitcodiac
| 53rd | 1995–1999 | Ken MacLeod | Liberal |
| 54th | 1999–2003 | John Betts | Progressive Conservative |
| 55th | 2003–2006 | John Betts | Progressive Conservative |
| 56th | 2006–2010 | John Betts | Progressive Conservative |
| 57th | 2010–2014 | John Betts | Progressive Conservative |
Moncton Northwest
| 58th | 2014–2018 | Ernie Steeves | Progressive Conservative |
| 59th | 2018–2020 | Ernie Steeves | Progressive Conservative |
| 60th | 2020–2024 | Ernie Steeves | Progressive Conservative |
| 61st | 2024–Present | Tania Sodhi | Liberal |

== Election results ==
=== Moncton Northwest ===
2024 New Brunswick general election
** Preliminary results — Not yet official **
| Party | Candidate | Votes | % | ±% |
|---|---|---|---|---|
| Liberal | Tania Sodhi | 3,761 | 46.43 | +14.5 |
| Progressive Conservative | Ernie Steeves | 3,536 | 43.65 | -4.7 |
| Green | Ana Santana | 804 | 9.92 | -0.6 |
| Total valid votes | | 8,101 | 99.83 | |
| Total rejected ballots | | 14 | 0.17 | |
| Turnout | | 8,115 | 65.76 | |
| Eligible voters | | 12,340 | | |
| Liberal gain from Progressive Conservative | | Swing | | +9.6 |
Source: Elections New Brunswick

2020 provincial election redistributed results
| Party | % |
|---|---|
| Progressive Conservative | 48.3 |
| Liberal | 31.9 |
| Green | 10.5 |
| People's Alliance | 6.2 |
| New Democratic | 3.1 |

2020 New Brunswick general election
| Party | Candidate | Votes | % | ±% |
|---|---|---|---|---|
| Progressive Conservative | Ernie Steeves | 4,111 | 51.50 | +10.43 |
| Liberal | Mark Black | 2,448 | 30.67 | -7.53 |
| Green | Laura Sanderson | 702 | 8.79 | +3.16 |
| People's Alliance | Shawn Soucoup | 493 | 6.18 | -5.10 |
| New Democratic | Cyprien Okana | 229 | 2.87 | -0.96 |
| Total valid votes | | 7,983 | | |
| Total rejected ballots | | 4 | 0.05 | -0.12 |
| Turnout | | 7,987 | 63.86 | +1.68 |
| Eligible voters | | 12,508 | | |
| Progressive Conservative hold | | Swing | | +8.98 |
Source: Elections New Brunswick

2018 New Brunswick general election
| Party | Candidate | Votes | % | ±% |
|---|---|---|---|---|
| Progressive Conservative | Ernie Steeves | 3,186 | 41.06 | -1.09 |
| Liberal | Courtney Pringle-Carver | 2,963 | 38.19 | -0.61 |
| People's Alliance | Myrna Geldart | 875 | 11.28 | +9.29 |
| Green | Keagan Slupsky | 437 | 5.63 | -0.47 |
| New Democratic | Cyprien Okana | 297 | 3.83 | -7.13 |
| Total valid votes | | 7,758 | 100.0 | |
| Total rejected ballots | | 13 | 0.17 | |
| Turnout | | 7,771 | 62.18 | |
| Eligible voters | | 12,498 | | |
Source: Elections New Brunswick

2014 New Brunswick general election
| Party | Candidate | Votes | % | ±% |
|---|---|---|---|---|
| Progressive Conservative | Ernie Steeves | 3,012 | 42.15 | -8.41 |
| Liberal | Brian Hicks | 2,773 | 38.80 | +7.99 |
| New Democratic | Jason Purdy | 783 | 10.96 | +1.18 |
| Green | Mike Milligan | 436 | 6.10 | -2.74 |
| People's Alliance | Carl Bainbridge | 142 | 1.99 | – |
| Total valid votes | | 7,146 | 100.0 | |
| Total rejected ballots | | 25 | 0.35 | |
| Turnout | | 7,171 | 59.57 | |
| Eligible voters | | 12,038 | | |
| Progressive Conservative notional hold | | Swing | | -8.20 |
Source: Elections New Brunswick

=== Moncton Crescent ===
2010 New Brunswick general election
| Party | Candidate | Votes | % | ±% |
|---|---|---|---|---|
| Progressive Conservative | John Betts | 4,168 | 50.56 | -3.97 |
| Liberal | Russ Mallard | 2,540 | 30.81 | -11.04 |
| New Democratic | Syp Okana | 806 | 9.78 | +6.17 |
| Green | Mike Milligan | 729 | 8.84 | – |
| Total valid votes | | 8,243 | | |
| Total rejected ballots | | 51 | 0.61 | |
| Turnout | | 8,294 | 61.36 | |
| Eligible voters | | 13,517 | | |
| Progressive Conservative hold | | Swing | | +3.54 |
Source: Elections New Brunswick

2006 New Brunswick general election
| Party | Candidate | Votes | % | ±% |
|---|---|---|---|---|
| Progressive Conservative | John Betts | 4,271 | 54.53 | +5.54 |
| Liberal | Shirley Smallwood | 3,278 | 41.85 | -1.88 |
| New Democratic | Ian Thorn | 283 | 3.61 | -3.66 |
| Total valid votes | | 7,832 | | |
| Progressive Conservative hold | | Swing | | +3.71 |
Source: Elections New Brunswick

2003 New Brunswick general election
| Party | Candidate | Votes | % | ±% |
|---|---|---|---|---|
| Progressive Conservative | John Betts | 4,230 | 48.99 | -12.54 |
| Liberal | Ray Goudreau | 3,776 | 43.73 | +15.26 |
| New Democratic | Richard Goulding | 628 | 7.27 | -1.64 |
| Total valid votes | | 8,634 | 100.0 | |
| Progressive Conservative hold | | Swing | | -13.90 |
Source: Elections New Brunswick

1999 New Brunswick general election
| Party | Candidate | Votes | % | ±% |
|---|---|---|---|---|
| Progressive Conservative | John Betts | 4,825 | 61.53 | +40.23 |
| Liberal | Kenneth R. MacLeod | 2,233 | 28.47 | -26.34 |
| New Democratic | Carl Fowler | 699 | 8.91 | +2.82 |
| Confederation of Regions | Albert H. Wood | 85 | 1.08 | -13.47 |
| Total valid votes | | 7,842 | 100.0 | |
| Progressive Conservative gain from Liberal | | Swing | | +33.28 |
Source: Elections New Brunswick

1995 New Brunswick general election
| Party | Candidate | Votes | % | ±% |
|---|---|---|---|---|
| Liberal | Ken MacLeod | 3,832 | 54.81 | |
| Progressive Conservative | Barbara Winsor | 1,489 | 21.30 | |
| Confederation of Regions | Dean Ryder | 1,017 | 14.55 | |
| New Democratic | Richard Hay | 426 | 6.09 | |
| Independent | Richard Mullins | 227 | 3.25 | |
| Total valid votes | | 6,991 | 100.0 | |
| Liberal notional gain | | Swing | | |
Source: Elections New Brunswick

== See also ==
- List of New Brunswick provincial electoral districts
- Canadian provincial electoral districts
