= Val-Doucet, New Brunswick =

Coordinates: 47.612°N 65.214°W

Location of Val-Doucet in New Brunswick

Val-Doucet is a settlement in New Brunswick.

== Culture ==
=== Notable people ===
- Denis Landry, MP, leader of the Opposition, minister and later mayor.

== See also ==
- List of communities in New Brunswick
