= Department of Local Government (New Brunswick) =

The Department of Local Government is a former department of the government of New Brunswick. It was created on February 14, 2006 by the Graham Government with the separation of the Departments of Environment and of Local Government. The Lord Government had combined the Departments of Environment and Municipalities and Housing in 2000 to form the Department of Environment and Local Government.

On March 15, 2012, the Department of Environment and Department of Local Government re-merged, once again forming the Department of Environment and Local Government under the Alward government.

== Ministers ==
#	Minister	Term	Government
1.	Trevor Holder	February 14, 2006 - October 3, 2006	under Bernard Lord
2.	Victor Boudreau	October 3, 2006 - October 31, 2007	under Shawn Graham
3.	Carmel Robichaud	October 31, 2007 - November 12, 2008	under Shawn Graham
4.	Bernard LeBlanc	November 12, 2008 - January 4, 2010	under Shawn Graham
5.	Chris Collins	January 4, 2010 - October 12, 2010	under Shawn Graham
6.	Bruce Fitch	October 12, 2010 - March 15, 2012	under David Alward
Merged with Department of Environment
7.	Daniel Allain	September 29, 2020 – June 27, 2023	under Blaine Higgs
8.	Glen Savoie	June 27, 2023 - November 2, 2024	under Blaine Higgs
9.	Aaron Kennedy	November 2, 2024 - present	under Susan Holt
