= Department of Environment and Local Government (New Brunswick) =

Agency overview
- Formed: 15 March 2012
- Jurisdiction: New Brunswick
- Parent department: Government of New Brunswick

The Department of Environment and Local Government is a part of the Government of New Brunswick. It is charged with maintaining relationships with New Brunswick's municipalities, administering its unincorporated Local Service Districts and the administration of its environmental policy, including the Province's Environmental Impact Assessment Regulation.

The department was established on March 23, 2000 when Premier Bernard Lord restructured the New Brunswick Cabinet. It was a merger of the former Department of Environment and part of the former Department of Municipalities and Housing. On February 14, 2006 it was split into the Department of Environment and the Department of Local Government. On March 15, 2012 it was re-established when the departments of Environment and Local Government were merged under the incumbent Minister of Local Government Bruce Fitch.

== Ministers ==
#	Minister	Term	Administration
1.	Kim Jardine	March 23, 2000 – June 27, 2003	under Bernard Lord
2.	Brenda Fowlie	June 27, 2003 - July 21, 2005	under Bernard Lord
–	Dale Graham (acting)	July 21, 2005 - November 21, 2005	under Bernard Lord
3.	Trevor Holder*	November 21, 2005 - February 14, 2006	under Bernard Lord
see Department of Environment and Department of Local Government
4.	Bruce Fitch**	March 15, 2012 - September 23, 2013	under David Alward
5.	Danny Soucy	September 23, 2013 – October 7, 2014	under David Alward
6.	Brian Kenny	October 7, 2014 - June 6, 2016	Brian Gallant
6.	Serge Rousselle	June 6, 2016 - May 11, 2018	Brian Gallant
7.	Andrew Harvey	May 11, 2018 - November 8, 2018	Brian Gallant
8.	Jeff Carr	November 9, 2018 - September 29, 2020	Blaine Higgs

* Holder continued as minister in the new Department of Environment.
** Fitch had been serving as minister of local government.
