= Caraquet (electoral district) =

Provincial electoral district in New Brunswick, Canada

New Brunswick electoral district
- The riding of Caraquet (as it exists from 2023) in relation to other New Brunswick electoral districts
- Coordinates: 47.731°N 64.991°W

Provincial electoral district
- Legislature: Legislative Assembly of New Brunswick
MLA
Isabelle Thériault
Liberal
- District created: 1973
- First contested: 1974
- Last contested: 2024

Demographics
- Population (2011): 12,866
- Electors (2013): 11,004
- Census division: Gloucester
- Census subdivision(s): Caraquet, Grand-Anse, Hautes-Terres, Saint-Léolin

Caraquet is a provincial electoral district for the Legislative Assembly of New Brunswick, Canada. It was created in 1973 from Gloucester. The riding is centred on the town of Caraquet, extending west to Grande-Anse, New Brunswick and Saint-Léolin, New Brunswick and south to Hautes-Terres, New Brunswick.

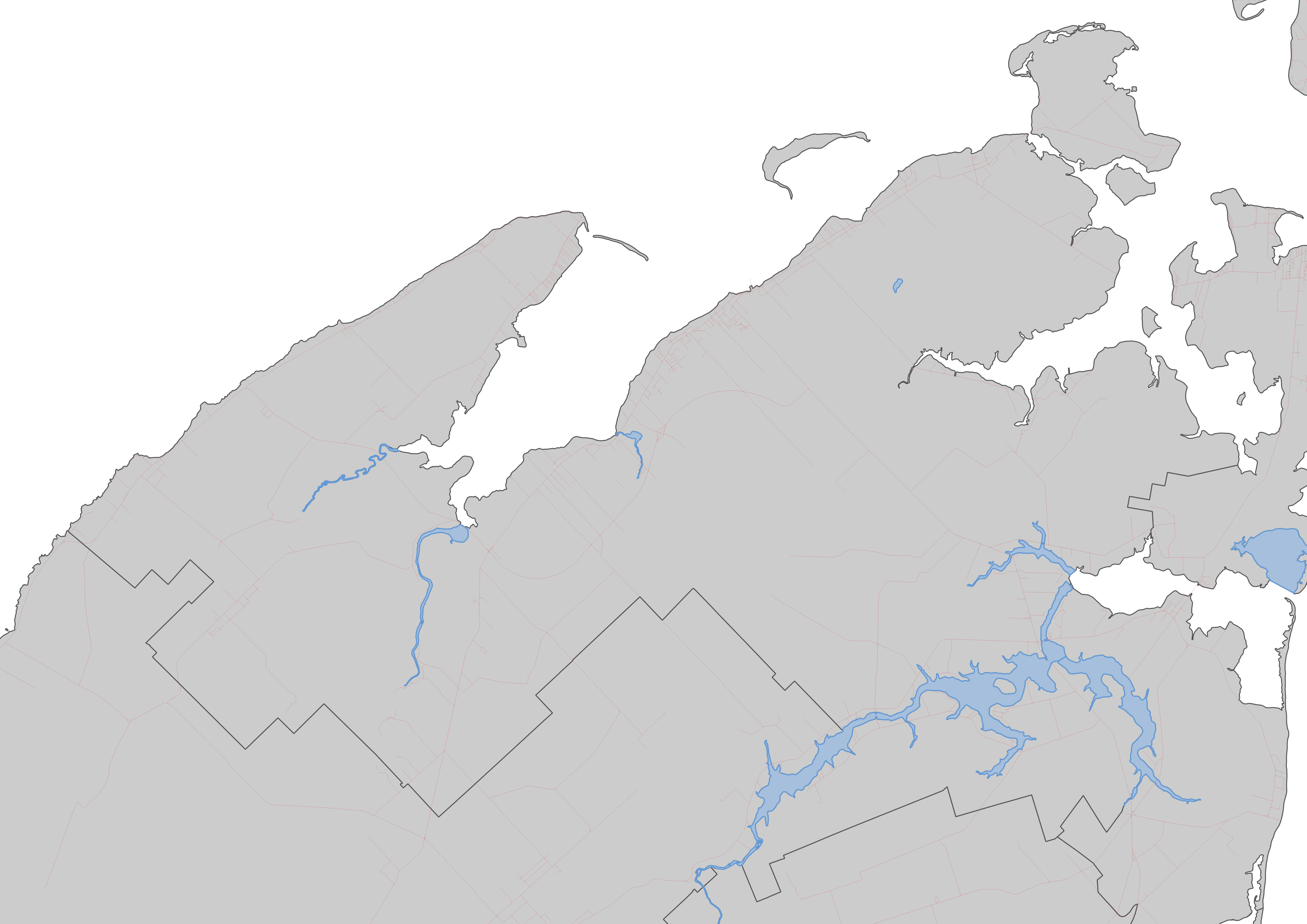
Caraquet (as it exists from 2023) and the roads in the riding

== Members of the Legislative Assembly ==
Assembly	Years	Member	Party
Riding created from Gloucester
48th	1974–1978	Onil Doiron	Liberal
49th	1978–1982	Onil Doiron	Liberal
50th	1982–1987	Emery Robichaud	Progressive Conservative
51st	1987–1991	Bernard Thériault	Liberal
52nd	1991–1995	Bernard Thériault	Liberal
53rd	1995–1999	Bernard Thériault	Liberal
54th	1999–2000	Bernard Thériault	Liberal
54th	2001–2003	Gaston Moore	Progressive Conservative
55th	2003–2006	Hédard Albert	Liberal
56th	2006–2010	Hédard Albert	Liberal
57th	2010–2014	Hédard Albert	Liberal
58th	2014–2018	Hédard Albert	Liberal
59th	2018–2020	Isabelle Thériault	Liberal
60th	2020–2024	Isabelle Thériault	Liberal
61st	2024–Present	Isabelle Thériault	Liberal

== Election results ==
2024 New Brunswick general election
Party	Candidate	Votes	%	±%
Liberal	Isabelle Thériault	6,002		
Progressive Conservative	Jean Paul Lanteigne	719		
Total valid votes		6,021	100.00	
Total rejected ballots				
Turnout				
Eligible voters				
Liberal hold		Swing		
Source: Elections New Brunswick

2020 New Brunswick general election
Party	Candidate	Votes	%	±%
Liberal	Isabelle Thériault	5,928	72.27	+8.49
Green	Marie-Christine Haché	1,290	15.73	+11.84
Progressive Conservative	Kevin Haché	985	12.01	-9.49
Total valid votes		8,203	100.00	
Total rejected ballots		64	0.77	+0.28
Turnout		8,267	75.65	-1.44
Eligible voters		10,928		
Liberal hold		Swing		-1.68
Source: Elections New Brunswick

2018 New Brunswick general election
Party	Candidate	Votes	%	±%
Liberal	Isabelle Thériault	5,420	63.78	+6.96
Progressive Conservative	Kevin Haché	1,827	21.50	-0.36
New Democratic	Katy Casavant	548	6.45	-12.58
Independent	Guilmond Hébert	373	4.39	--
Green	Yvon Durelle	330	3.88	+1.58
Total valid votes		8,498	99.51	
Total rejected ballots		42	0.49	-0.06
Turnout		8,540	77.09	
Eligible voters		11,078		
Liberal hold		Swing		+3.66

2014 New Brunswick general election
Party	Candidate	Votes	%	±%
Liberal	Hédard Albert	4,716	56.82	+6.74
Progressive Conservative	Suzanne Morais-Vienneau	1,814	21.86	-19.74
New Democratic	Mathieu Chayer	1,579	19.02	+13.47
Green	Sophie Chiasson-Gould	191	2.30	-0.46
Total valid votes		8,300	100.0	
Total rejected ballots		46	0.55	
Turnout		8,346	74.94	
Eligible voters		11,137		
Liberal notional hold		Swing		+13.24

2010 New Brunswick general election
Party	Candidate	Votes	%	±%
Liberal	Hédard Albert	3,661	50.08	-13.33
Progressive Conservative	Philip Chiasson	3,041	41.60	+18.38
New Democratic	Claudia Julien	406	5.55	-7.82
Green	Mathieu Chayer	202	2.76	–
Total valid votes		7,310	100.0	
Total rejected ballots		70	0.95	
Turnout		7,380	81.26	
Eligible voters		9,082		
Liberal hold		Swing		-15.86

2006 New Brunswick general election
Party	Candidate	Votes	%	±%
Liberal	Hédard Albert	4,580	63.41	+15.75
Progressive Conservative	Claude L'Espérance	1,677	23.22	-23.17
New Democratic	Stephane Doiron	966	13.37	+7.40
Total valid votes		7,223	100.0	
Total rejected ballots		136	1.85	
Turnout		7,359	78.77	
Eligible voters		9,342		
Liberal notional hold		Swing		+19.46

2003 New Brunswick general election
Party	Candidate	Votes	%	±%
Liberal	Hédard Albert	3,649	47.66	+3.33
Progressive Conservative	Gaston Moore	3,550	46.39	-6.85
New Democratic	Gérard Béland	457	5.97	+3.54
Total valid votes		7,656	100.0	
Liberal gain from Progressive Conservative		Swing		+5.09
Changes are from the 2001 by-election.

New Brunswick provincial by-election, 2001
Party	Candidate	Votes	%	±%
Progressive Conservative	Gaston Moore	4,122	53.24	+11.95
Liberal	Roberta Dugas	3,432	44.33	-7.07
New Democratic	Gérard Béland	188	2.43	-4.87
Total valid votes		7,742	100.0	
Progressive Conservative gain from Liberal		Swing		+9.51

1999 New Brunswick general election
Party	Candidate	Votes	%	±%
Liberal	Bernard Thériault	4,194	51.40	-2.20
Progressive Conservative	Gaston Moore	3,369	41.29	+19.15
New Democratic	Denis Doiron	596	7.30	-14.69
Total valid votes		8,159	100.0	
Liberal hold		Swing		-10.68

1995 New Brunswick general election
Party	Candidate	Votes	%	±%
Liberal	Bernard Thériault	4,367	53.60	-0.77
Progressive Conservative	Bernard Haché	1,804	22.14	-1.25
New Democratic	Jean-Marie Nadeau	1,792	21.99	-0.25
Natural Law	Marc Boulay	68	0.83	–
Total valid votes		8,031	100.0	
Liberal hold		Swing		+0.24

1991 New Brunswick general election
Party	Candidate	Votes	%	±%
Liberal	Bernard Thériault	5,298	54.37	-0.30
Progressive Conservative	Gilbert Godin	2,279	23.39	-20.29
New Democratic	Roger Duguay	2,167	22.24	+20.58
Total valid votes		9,744	100.0	
Liberal hold		Swing		+10.00

1987 New Brunswick general election
Party	Candidate	Votes	%	±%
Liberal	Bernard Thériault	5,642	54.67	+15.74
Progressive Conservative	Emery Robichaud	4,508	43.68	-4.49
New Democratic	Gérard Rousselle	171	1.66	-1.17
Total valid votes		10,321	100.0	
Liberal gain from Progressive Conservative		Swing		+10.12

1982 New Brunswick general election
Party	Candidate	Votes	%	±%
Progressive Conservative	Emery Robichaud	4,619	48.17	+14.21
Liberal	Onil Doiron	3,733	38.93	-8.54
Parti acadien	Louise Blanchard	966	10.07	-8.48
New Democratic	Yvon Roy	271	2.83	–
Total valid votes		9,589	100.0	
Progressive Conservative gain from Liberal		Swing		+11.38

1978 New Brunswick general election
Party	Candidate	Votes	%	±%
Liberal	Onil Doiron	3,925	47.47	-4.98
Progressive Conservative	Beatrice "Bibi" Doiron	2,809	33.97	-10.66
Parti acadien	Michel Blanchard	1,534	18.55	+15.63
Total valid votes		8,268	100.0	
Liberal hold		Swing		+2.84

1974 New Brunswick general election
Party	Candidate	Votes	%
Liberal	Onil Doiron	3,749	52.45
Progressive Conservative	Fernand Lanteigne	3,190	44.63
Parti acadien	Hector Boudreau	209	2.92
Total valid votes		7,148	100.0
This riding was created from the multi-member riding of Gloucester, which elected 5 (of 5) Liberals in 1970; one Progressive Conservative was elected in a 1972 by-election. None of the five incumbents ran in this riding.

== See also ==
- List of New Brunswick provincial electoral districts
- Canadian provincial electoral districts
