= Kenneth R. MacLeod =

Canadian politician

Kenneth R. "Ken" MacLeod (born December 5, 1955) is a former political figure in New Brunswick, Canada. He represented Moncton Crescent in the Legislative Assembly of New Brunswick from 1995 to 1999 as a Liberal member.

He was born in Moncton, New Brunswick, the son of Roy MacLeod and Edith Quan. MacLeod was educated at Acadia University and Mount Allison University. In 1976, he married Miriam Wilson. MacLeod was defeated when he ran for reelection in 1999.

Legislative Assembly of New Brunswick
New seat	MLA Moncton Crescent; 1995-1999	Succeeded by John Betts
