= Danny Soucy =

Canadian politician

Member of the Legislative Assembly of New Brunswick
- In office October 12, 2010 – 2014
- Preceded by: Ron Ouellette
- Succeeded by: riding dissolved
- Constituency: Grand Falls-Drummond-Saint-André

Personal details
- Party: Progressive Conservative

Daniel Soucy is a Canadian politician, who was elected to the Legislative Assembly of New Brunswick in the 2010 provincial election. He represented the electoral district of Grand Falls-Drummond-Saint-André as a member of the Progressive Conservatives until the 2014 provincial election, when he was defeated by Chuck Chiasson in the redistributed riding of Victoria-la-Vallée.
