= Marcelle Mersereau =

Canadian politician

MLA for Bathurst
- In office 1991–2003
- Preceded by: Paul Kenny
- Succeeded by: Brian Kenny

Personal details
- Born: February 14, 1942 (age 84) Pointe-Verte, New Brunswick, Canada
- Party: Liberal

Marcelle Mersereau (born February 14, 1942, in Pointe-Verte, New Brunswick) is a Canadian politician.

A civil servant for most of her career, she also served as a councillor on Bathurst, New Brunswick city council while on the provincial payroll from 1980 to 1991. She resigned her seat on council upon being elected to the Legislative Assembly of New Brunswick in the 1991 provincial election. A member of Frank McKenna's Liberal Party, she was immediately named to cabinet and became deputy premier in 1994. She served in a variety of roles in cabinet until the defeat of the Liberals in the 1999 election. She defeated PC candidate Robert N. Stairs to retain her seat in Bathurst, one of only 10 Liberals to survive what was their worst ever electoral defeat.

In opposition she was a top critic and the media reported she had lost the vote in her caucus to become interim leader of her party by a margin of 4-3 following the resignation of Camille Thériault. Her most high-profile role in opposition was that of finance critic. She did not seek re-election to the legislature in 2003 but has remained active in her party. She was elected vice president of the New Brunswick Liberal Association on October 4, 2003, and re-elected on October 15, 2005. During the 2004 federal election, she was co-chair of the Liberal campaign in New Brunswick. She was the Liberal candidate for the House of Commons of Canada in the riding of Acadie—Bathurst in the 2006 federal election, but finished second to Yvon Godin of the New Democratic Party.

She served as co-chair of the successful Liberal campaign as it prepared for the 2006 provincial election. She succeeded Greg Byrne as president of the New Brunswick Liberal Party when he resigned after being appointed to the cabinet following the 2006 election and served the post until stepping down in the Fall of 2007.

2006 Canadian federal election: Acadie—Bathurst
| Party | Candidate | Votes | % | ±% | Expenditures |
|---|---|---|---|---|---|
| New Democratic | Yvon Godin | 25,195 | 49.90 | -4.03 | $69,502.02 |
| Liberal | Marcelle Mersereau | 15,504 | 30.71 | -1.96 | $65,035.20 |
| Conservative | Serge Savoie | 8,513 | 16.86 | +5.92 | $54,729.58 |
| Green | Philippe Rouselle | 699 | 1.38 | -1.07 | $774.79 |
| Independent | Eric Landry | 362 | 0.72 | – | $2,613.63 |
| Independent | Ulric Degrâce | 219 | 0.43 | – | none listed |
| Total valid votes/expense limit | | 50,492 | 100.0 | | $74,710 |
| Total rejected, unmarked and declined ballots | | 523 | 1.03 | -0.15 | |
| Turnout | | 51,015 | 75.46 | +5.08 | |
| Eligible voters | | 67,608 | | | |
| New Democratic hold | | Swing | | -1.04 | |

New Brunswick provincial government of Camille Thériault
Cabinet post (1)
| Predecessor | Office | Successor |
|---|---|---|
| Ann Breault | Minister of Municipalities and Housing; 1998–1999; Breault served as Minister of Municipalities, Culture & Housing; MacAlpine served as Minister of Municipalities; Mockler served as Minister of Human Resources Development & Housing | Joan MacAlpine and Percy Mockler |
Special Cabinet Responsibilities
| Predecessor | Title | Successor |
| herself in Frenette government | Minister responsible for the Status of Women; 1998–1999 | Margaret-Ann Blaney |
New Brunswick provincial government of Ray Frenette
Cabinet post (1)
| Predecessor | Office | Successor |
| herself in McKenna government | Minister of Human Resources Development; 1997–1998 | Georgie Day |
Special Cabinet Responsibilities
| Predecessor | Title | Successor |
| herself in McKenna government | Minister responsible for the Status of Women; 1997–1998 | herself in Thériault government |
New Brunswick provincial government of Frank McKenna
Cabinet posts (3)
| Predecessor | Office | Successor |
| Ann Breault | Minister of Human Resources Development; 1995–1997 | herself in Frenette government |
| Jane Barry | Minister of Environment; 1994–1995 | Vaughn Blaney |
| Hubert Seamans | Minister of Municipalities, Culture and Housing; 1991–1994 | Paul Duffie |
Special Cabinet Responsibilities
| Predecessor | Title | Successor |
| Frank McKenna | Minister responsible for the Status of Women; 1994–1997 | herself in Frenette government |
| Aldéa Landry | Deputy Premier of New Brunswick; 1994–1995 | Ray Frenette |

| Preceded by Shawn Graham | Chair of the Liberal caucus 2002 | Succeeded by Bernard Richard |
