= John McKay (New Brunswick politician) =

Canadian politician

John Bradley McKay (born June 8, 1948) is a former politician in New Brunswick, Canada. He was a member of the province's legislative assembly and served as mayor of the city of Miramichi, New Brunswick from 2004 to 2008.

McKay was born in Newcastle, New Brunswick to William John McKay and Elmira F. McKay (née Scott). He attended the New Brunswick Teacher's College and the University of New Brunswick. He became a school teacher.

McKay was elected to the Legislature on November 18, 1974 to represent the Liberal in the new single-member riding of Miramichi-Newcastle. McKay was re-elected on October 23, 1978, and served four years as Financial Critic. McKay was mayor of Newcastle from 1986 to 1987. He was re-elected again on October 13, 1987, and on September 23, 1991. After a provincial redistribution abolished the old constituency, he was re-elected on September 11, 1995 to represent the Miramichi Centre from 1995 to 1999. He was speaker of the provincial assembly from 1996 to 1997. In 1999, he was defeated in a re-election bid by Progressive Conservative Kim Jardine.

== Other ==
McKay has been past president of the Miramichi Historical Society, former director of the French Fort Cove Development Commission, former director of the Northumberland Organization of the Disabled and a member of the Newcastle Rotary Club.

== Personal life ==
McKay is married to the former Sandra Murphy.

== Sources ==
- Canadian Parliamentary Guide, 1997, Kathryn O'Handley; ISBN 1-896413-43-9

Preceded by Danny Gay	Speaker of the Legislative Assembly of New Brunswick; 1997–1999	Succeeded by Bev Harrison
Preceded by riding created	Member of the Legislative Assembly for Miramichi Centre; 1995–1999	Succeeded by Kim Jardine (Progressive Conservative)
Preceded by Paul Dawson (Progressive Conservative)	Member of the Legislative Assembly for Miramichi-Newcastle; 1987–1995	Succeeded by riding abolished
Preceded by ?	Member of the Legislative Assembly for Miramichi-Newcastle; 1974–1982	Succeeded by Paul Dawson (Progressive Conservative)
