= Bernard Thériault =

Canadian politician

Chief of Staff to the Premier of New Brunswick
- In office October 30, 2006 – October 12, 2010
- Premier: Shawn Graham
- Preceded by: Doug Tyler
- Succeeded by: Nancy McKay
New Brunswick Executive Council
Minister of Education
Acting
In office February 6, 1998 – May 14, 1998
Premier	Ray Frenette
Preceded by	Bernard Richard
Succeeded by	Bernard Richard
Minister of Intergovernmental and Aboriginal Affairs
In office July 21, 1997 – June 21, 1999
Premier	Frank McKenna; Ray Frenette; Camille Thériault
Succeeded by	Bernard Lord
Minister of Fisheries and Aquaculture
In office April 27, 1994 – July 23, 1997
Premier	Frank McKenna; Ray Frenette
Preceded by	Camille Thériault
Succeeded by	Danny Gay
Parliamentary constituencies
Member of the New Brunswick Legislative Assembly for Caraquet
In office October 13, 1987 – 2000
Preceded by	Emery Robichaud
Succeeded by	Gaston Moore (2001)

Personal details
- Born: November 12, 1955 (age 70) New Brunswick, Canada
- Party: Liberal (federal); Liberal (provincial)

Bernard Thériault (born November 12, 1955) is a politician in the province of New Brunswick, Canada. He served as chief of staff to Premier of New Brunswick Shawn Graham, beginning October 30, 2006.

Thériault was employed from 1978 to 1987 as curator and historian at the Acadian Historic Village in Caraquet, New Brunswick, his hometown.

He was elected as a Liberal to the Legislative Assembly of New Brunswick in the 1987 election and was re-elected in 1991, 1995 and 1999. He joined the cabinet in 1994 as Minister of Fisheries and Aquaculture. In 1997, he became Minister of Intergovernmental and Aboriginal Affairs, a post he held until the defeat of the Liberal government in the 1999 election. He also served as acting Minister of Education in 1998 while Bernard Richard stepped down from the post to seek the Liberal leadership.

He served briefly in opposition following the 1999 election before resigning in 2000 to run for the Liberal Party of Canada in the 2000 federal election. He was defeated by incumbent New Democratic Member of Parliament Yvon Godin in the riding of Acadie—Bathurst.

Following his election defeat, he began to work for the federal civil service from 2000 to 2006. On October 12, 2006 it was announced that he would be leaving his federal post to become chief of staff to the new Liberal premier Shawn Graham effective October 30, 2006.

2000 Canadian federal election: Acadie—Bathurst
Party	Candidate	Votes	%	±%	Expenditures
New Democratic	Yvon Godin	23,568	46.61	+6.08	$57,177
Liberal	Bernard Thériault	20,362	40.27	+4.91	$58,623
Progressive Conservative	Alcide Leger	4,321	8.55	-15.56	$36,600
Alliance	Jean Gauvin	2,314	4.58	–	$45,973
Total valid votes/expense limit		50,565	100.00	$63,209	
Total rejected ballots		624	1.22	-1.25	
Turnout		51,189	75.37	-3.28	
Electors on the lists		67,918	–	–	
NDP hold		Swing	+0.59		

== Sources ==
- "His legislative bio". Archived from the original on April 17, 1999.
- News release announcing his appointment as chief of staff
