= Ann Breault =

Canadian politician (1938–2021)

Gertrude Ann Breault (December 15, 1938 – September 26, 2021) was a teacher, nurse, journalist, and politician in New Brunswick, Canada. She represented St. Stephen-Milltown and then Western Charlotte in the Legislative Assembly of New Brunswick from 1987 to 1999 as a Liberal member.

Breault served in the province's Executive Council as Minister of Income Assistance (later Minister of Human Resources), Minister of State for Literacy, Minister of Municipalities, Culture and Housing and Minister of Health and Community Services. Breault retired from politics in 1999. She helped found the Fundy Region Transition House and the Charlotte County Day Care Centre.

Ann Breault was a mother of six, and has several grandchildren.

New Brunswick provincial government of Camille Thériault
Cabinet post (1)
| Predecessor | Office | Successor |
| Russ King | Minister of Health and Wellness; 1998–1999 | Dennis Furlong |
New Brunswick provincial government of Ray Frenette
Cabinet post (1)
| Predecessor | Office | Successor |
| herself in McKenna government | Minister of Municipalities, Culture and Housing; 1997–1998 | Marcelle Mersereau |
New Brunswick provincial government of Frank McKenna
Cabinet posts (2)
| Predecessor | Office | Successor |
| Paul Duffie | Minister of Municipalities, Culture and Housing; 1995–1997 | herself in Frenette government |
| Laureen Jarrett | Minister of Income Assistance; 1991–1995 | Marcelle Mersereau |
