= Gaston Moore =

Canadian politician (born 1945)

Gaston Moore (born December 29, 1945) is a former political figure in New Brunswick, Canada. He represented Caraquet in the Legislative Assembly of New Brunswick from 2001 to 2003 as a Progressive Conservative member.

He was born in Moffet, Quebec, the son of Georges Moore and Eva Nadeau. A former police officer with the Service de police de la Ville de Montréal, Moore was also a fisherman for several years. He married Georgette Friolet with whom he has three daughters and three sons. Moore ran unsuccessfully for a seat in the provincial assembly in 1999. He was elected in a 2001 by-election held after Bernard Thériault ran for a seat in the House of Commons. He was defeated by a narrow margin in the 2003 general election. Moore was mayor of Bas-Caraquet from 1995 to 2001.
