= John Betts (Canadian politician) =

Canadian teacher and politician

MLA for Moncton Crescent
- In office 1999–2014
- Preceded by: Ken MacLeod
- Succeeded by: riding dissolved

Personal details
- Born: February 17, 1949 (age 77) Moncton, New Brunswick
- Party: Progressive Conservative

John Willis Betts (born February 17, 1949) is a Canadian teacher and politician, who was a member of the Legislative Assembly of New Brunswick for the riding of Moncton Crescent from 1999 to 2014.

Betts was born in Moncton, New Brunswick. He earned an ice hockey scholarship to Gordon College in Boston, Massachusetts and graduated with a Bachelor of Science degree. He went on to earn a Bachelor of Education and a Master's Degree in Education Administration from the University of Moncton.

Betts was a longtime member of the Moncton City Council, having been elected in 1986, 1989, 1992, 1995 and 1998. He resigned from council upon his election to the legislature in 1999. He was re-elected to the legislature in 2003 and 2006.

He sits as a Progressive Conservative. From 2003-2006, his party held only a one-seat majority which could have collapsed upon the long term absence of any of its members. Betts, who previously had a quadruple heart bypass in 1994, was hospitalized in early 2005 with what was thought to be a minor heart attack forcing the government to delay several votes. Betts since returned to work in good health having only suffered severe indigestion.

On December 7, 2005, he was named deputy speaker replacing Trevor Holder who had been elevated to the cabinet. He ceased being deputy speaker on August 18, 2006 with the dissolution of the legislature for a general election.

== See also ==
- John Felton Betts Northwest Territories MLA 1888 - 1898
