= David Charles Jordan =

Canadian politician and businessman

David Charles Jordan (born October 4, 1949) is a businessman and former political figure in New Brunswick, Canada. He represented Grand Lake in the Legislative Assembly of New Brunswick from 1999 to 2003 as a Progressive Conservative member.

He was born in Minto, New Brunswick, the son of Victor Jordan. Jordan worked in automobile sales and also owned his own business. He was a resident of Ripples. Jordan was defeated when he ran for reelection in 2003.
