= Carole Keddy =

Canadian politician and educator (1937–2016)

Carole Juanita Keddy (June 20, 1937 – January 2016) was a Canadian educator and political figure in New Brunswick, Canada. She represented Saint John Champlain in the Legislative Assembly of New Brunswick from 1999 to 2003 as a Progressive Conservative member.

Born in Saint John, New Brunswick, Keddy was educated at the New Brunswick Teacher's College, the University of New Brunswick and the University of Maryland, College Park. She was a teacher, vice-principal and principal in New Brunswick, Ontario, Manitoba, the Northwest Territories, the Yukon and Germany and taught at Simon Fraser University. She also owned and operated a manufacturing company while in British Columbia. From 1962 to 1966, Keddy worked with the North Atlantic Treaty Organization. Following her career in provincial politics, Keddy ran unsuccessfully for a seat on the Saint John City Council in 1995, 2004 and 2008.

Keddy died in January 2016, at the age of 78.

Preceded by Roly MacIntyre (Liberal)	MLA for Saint John Champlain; 1999–2003	Succeeded by Roly MacIntyre (Liberal)
