= Jean-Guy Laforest =

Canadian politician and business owner

Jean-Guy Laforest (born March 11, 1944) is a retired business owner and former political figure in New Brunswick, Canada. He represented Grand Falls Region in the Legislative Assembly of New Brunswick from 1999 to 2003 as a Progressive Conservative member.

He was born in Grand Falls, New Brunswick, the son of Armand Laforest. He studied at the Bathurst Technical School. Laforest worked as a barber, then as a metal polisher, machine operator and later as a foreman at a manufacturing plant. From 1979 to 1987, he owned and operated a restaurant and night club in Madawaska, Maine. He was a school bus driver in Grand Falls from 1990 to 1999. He was defeated when he ran for reelection in 2003.
