= Kim Jardine =

Canadian politician (born 1966)

Member of the Legislative Assembly of New Brunswick for Miramichi Centre
- In office 1999–2003

New Brunswick Minister of Environment
- In office 1999–2001

New Brunswick Minister of Environment and Local Government
- In office 2001–2003

Personal details
- Party: Progressive Conservative

Kim Jardine (born April 12, 1966) is an educator, entrepreneur and former political figure in New Brunswick, Canada. She represented Miramichi Centre in the Legislative Assembly of New Brunswick from 1999 to 2003 as a Progressive Conservative member.

She was born in Saint John, New Brunswick and was educated at the University of New Brunswick. Jardine served in the province's Executive Council as Minister of Environment and Minister of Environment and Local Government. She was defeated in a bid for reelection in 2003. In 2007, Jardine married Jeannot Volpé, another former member of Lord's cabinet.

New Brunswick provincial government of Bernard Lord
Cabinet posts (2)
Predecessor	Office	Successor
self as Minister of Environment	Minister of Environment and Local Government; 2000–2003	Brenda Fowlie
Gene Devereux	Minister of Environment; 1999–2000	self as Minister of Environment and Local Government
