= 55th New Brunswick Legislature =

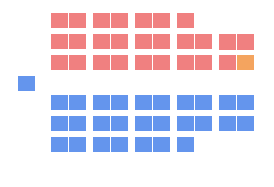
Rendition of party representation in the 55th New Brunswick Legislative Assembly, at its first session after the 2003 election. Progressive Conservatives (28) Liberals (26) New Democrats (1)

The 55th New Brunswick Legislative Assembly was created following a general election in 2003 and was dissolved on August 18, 2006.

== Leadership ==
The speaker from its first meeting until February 14, 2006 was Bev Harrison who had served as speaker in the 54th Assembly as well. Harrison resigned from the post to join the cabinet.

Michael Malley was elected speaker by acclamation on March 28, 2006 and served in that role until the assembly was dissolved.

Premier Bernard Lord led the government for the whole of the life of the assembly.

Shawn Graham led the opposition for the whole of the life of the assembly.

From its forming to her resignation on October 13, 2005, Elizabeth Weir led the third party New Democrats. Following her resignation, the New Democrats were no longer represented in the assembly.

== Members ==
All were elected in the 35th general election held on June 9, 2003 except for Victor Boudreau who was elected in a by-election on October 4, 2004 and Ed Doherty who was elected in a by-election on November 14, 2005.

The standings were changed further on January 13, 2006, when Frank Branch left the Liberal caucus to sit as an independent; and on February 17, 2006, when then Progressive Conservative MLA Michael Malley crossed the floor to sit as an independent thus putting Bernard Lord's government into a minority situation. Malley, while serving as speaker, changed his affiliation back to Progressive Conservative on April 13, 2006. Some controversy arose following this as following the 2003 election, the House unanimously passed a motion requiring the Opposition Liberals to pair a member with the speaker during meetings of committees of the whole in order to maintain the government majority in such situations. The Opposition argued that there was no precedent for a speaker to cross the floor and therefore, they did not recognize that a majority government existed and would not honour this motion under the circumstances. The House voted on May 30, 2006 to express confidence in the Speaker and therefore, implicitly, approve of his change of affiliation. From that date forward, the Liberals accepted Malley as a Progressive Conservative.

=== Members at dissolution ===
Name	Party	Electoral District	First elected / previously elected
**Wayne Steeves**	Progressive Conservative	Albert	1999
Brian Kenny	Liberal	Bathurst	2003
Roy Boudreau	Liberal	Campbellton	2003
Hédard Albert	Liberal	Caraquet	2003
**Dale Graham**	Progressive Conservative	Carleton	1993
Denis Landry	Liberal	Centre-Péninsule	1995, 2003
Rick Doucet	Liberal	Charlotte	2003
Donald Arseneault	Liberal	Dalhousie-Restigouche East	2003
Cy LeBlanc	Progressive Conservative	Dieppe-Memramcook	1999
**Madeleine Dubé**	Progressive Conservative	Edmundston	1999
Thomas J. Burke	Liberal	Fredericton North	2003
**Brad Green**	Progressive Conservative	Fredericton South	1998
Kelly Lamrock	Liberal	Fredericton-Fort Nashwaak	2003
Eric Allaby	Liberal	Fundy Isles	1987
Milt Sherwood	Progressive Conservative	Grand Bay-Westfield	1995
Ronald Ouellette	Liberal	Grand Falls Region	2003
Eugene McGinley	Liberal	Grand Lake	1972, (Note: Bathurst) 2003
**Bev Harrison**	Progressive Conservative	Hampton-Belleisle	1978, (Note: Saint John-Fundy) 1999
**Brenda Fowlie**	Progressive Conservative	Kennebecasis	1999
Shawn Graham	Liberal	Kent	1998
**Claude Williams**	Progressive Conservative	Kent South	2001
LeRoy Armstrong	Liberal	Kings East	1995, 2003
**Paul Robichaud**	Progressive Conservative	Lamèque-Shippagan-Miscou	1999
**Kirk MacDonald**	Progressive Conservative	Mactaquac	1999
**Percy Mockler**	Progressive Conservative	Madawaska-la-Vallée	1982, 1993
**Jeannot Volpé**	Progressive Conservative	Madawaska-les-Lacs	1995
Carmel Robichaud	Liberal	Miramichi Bay	2003
John Winston Foran	Liberal	Miramichi Centre	2003
Michael Malley†	Progressive Conservative	Miramichi-Bay du Vin	1999
Michael Malley†	Independent	Miramichi-Bay du Vin	1999
Michael Malley†	Progressive Conservative	Miramichi-Bay du Vin	1999
John Betts	Progressive Conservative	Moncton Crescent	1999
**Bernard Lord**	Progressive Conservative	Moncton East	1998
Mike Murphy	Liberal	Moncton North	2003
**Joan MacAlpine-Stiles**	Progressive Conservative	Moncton South	1999
Frank Branch	Liberal	Nepisiguit	1970, 2003
Frank Branch	Independent	Nepisiguit	1970, 2003
**Keith Ashfield**	Progressive Conservative	New Maryland	1999
Roland Haché	Liberal	Nigadoo-Chaleur	1999
**Jody Carr**	Progressive Conservative	Oromocto-Gagetown	1999
Wally Stiles	Progressive Conservative	Petitcodiac	1999
Burt Paulin	Liberal	Restigouche West	2003
**Bruce Fitch**	Progressive Conservative	Riverview	2003
**Rose-May Poirier**	Progressive Conservative	Rogersville-Kouchibouguac	1999
Roly MacIntyre	Liberal	Saint John Champlain	1995, 2003
Elizabeth Weir	New Democratic	Saint John Harbour	1991
Ed Doherty (2005)	Liberal	Saint John Harbour	2005
Abel LeBlanc	Liberal	Saint John Lancaster	2003
**Trevor Holder**	Progressive Conservative	Saint John Portland	1999
Stuart Jamieson	Liberal	Saint John-Fundy	1987, 2003
Margaret-Ann Blaney	Progressive Conservative	Saint John-Kings	1999
Bernard Richard	Liberal	Shediac-Cap-Pélé	1991
Victor Boudreau (2004)	Liberal	Shediac-Cap-Pélé	2004
Rick Brewer	Liberal	Southwest Miramichi	2003
Peter Mesheau	Progressive Conservative	Tantramar	1997
Elvy Robichaud	Progressive Conservative	Tracadie-Sheila	1994
Larry Kennedy	Liberal	Victoria-Tobique	1987
Tony Huntjens	Progressive Conservative	Western Charlotte	1999
**David Alward**	Progressive Conservative	Woodstock	1999
Scott Targett	Liberal	York	2003

Bold denotes a member of the cabinet.
Italics denotes a party leader
† denotes the Speaker

=== Former members ===
- Bernard Richard, a Liberal first elected in the 1991 election, represented Shediac-Cap-Pelé from the formation of the assembly until his resignation on November 26, 2003.
- Elizabeth Weir, a New Democrat first elected in the 1991 election, represented Saint John Harbour from the formation of the assembly until her resignation on October 13, 2005.

== See also ==
- 2003 New Brunswick general election
- Legislative Assembly of New Brunswick

== Notes ==
Preceded by 54th Assembly	New Brunswick Legislative Assemblies; 2003–2006	Succeeded by 56th Assembly
