= 56th New Brunswick Legislature =

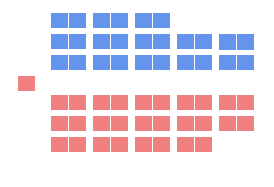
Rendition of party representation in the 56th New Brunswick Legislative Assembly, if it sat immediately after the 2006 election. Liberals (29) Progressive Conservatives (26)

The 56th New Brunswick Legislative Assembly was created following a general election in 2006. Its members were sworn in on October 3, 2006 but it was called into session by the Lieutenant-Governor of New Brunswick on February 6, 2007.

== Leadership ==
Eugene McGinley, was elected speaker at the first session of the Assembly on February 6, 2007 but resigned on October 31, 2007 to join the cabinet. Roy Boudreau was elected speaker on November 27, 2007.

Premier of New Brunswick Shawn Graham leads the government.

Former Premier Bernard Lord was nominal leader of the opposition until January 31, 2007 at which time he resigned his seat and was replaced by interim leader of the Progressive Conservatives, Jeannot Volpé. On October 18, 2008, David Alward was elected leader of the Progressive Conservatives, his first sitting as leader of the opposition was November 25, 2008.

== Members ==
Most of the current members were elected at the 36th general election held on September 18, 2006. The exceptions are Chris Collins, who was elected in a by-election on March 5, 2007 as a result of the resignation of Bernard Lord on January 31, 2007; Jack Carr, who was elected in a by-election on November 3, 2008 as a result of the resignation of Keith Ashfield; and Burt Paulin, who was elected in a by-election on March 9, 2009 as a result of the resignation of Percy Mockler, Paul took his seat on March 20, 2009. The standing of the legislature also changed when MLAs Joan MacAlpine-Stiles and Wally Stiles crossed the floor from the Progressive Conservatives to the Liberals on April 17, 2007.

Name	Party	Riding	First elected / previously elected	Notes
Wayne Steeves	Progressive Conservative	Albert	1999	
**Brian Kenny**	Liberal	Bathurst	2003	
Roy Boudreau†	Liberal	Campbellton-Restigouche Centre	2003	
**Hédard Albert**	Liberal	Caraquet	2003	
Dale Graham	Progressive Conservative	Carleton	1993	
**Denis Landry**	Liberal	Centre-Péninsule-Saint-Sauveur	1995, 2003	
Tony Huntjens	Progressive Conservative	Charlotte-Campobello	1999	
**Rick Doucet**	Liberal	Charlotte-The Isles	2003	
**Donald Arseneault**	Liberal	Dalhousie-Restigouche East	2003	
Cy LeBlanc	Progressive Conservative	Dieppe Centre-Lewisville	1999	
Madeleine Dubé	Progressive Conservative	Edmundston-Saint Basile	1999	
**Kelly Lamrock**	Liberal	Fredericton-Fort Nashwaak	2003	
**Greg Byrne**	Liberal	Fredericton-Lincoln	1995, (Note: Fredericton-Fort Nashwaak) 2006	
**Thomas J. Burke**	Liberal	Fredericton-Nashwaaksis	2003	
Rick Miles	Liberal	Fredericton-Silverwood	2006	
**Jack Keir**	Liberal	Fundy-River Valley	2006	
**Ronald Ouellette**	Liberal	Grand Falls-Drummond-Saint-André	2003	
Eugene McGinley	Liberal	Grand Lake-Gagetown	1972, (Note: Bathurst) 2003	
Bev Harrison	Progressive Conservative	Hampton-Kings	1978, (Note: Saint John-Fundy) 1999	
**Shawn Graham**	Liberal	Kent	1998	
Claude Williams	Progressive Conservative	Kent South	2001	
Bruce Northrup	Progressive Conservative	Kings East	2006	
Paul Robichaud	Progressive Conservative	Lamèque-Shippagan-Miscou	1999	
Jeannot Volpé	Progressive Conservative	Madawaska-les-Lacs	1995	
**Bernard LeBlanc**	Liberal	Memramcook-Lakeville-Dieppe	2006	
Carmel Robichaud	Liberal	Miramichi Bay-Neguac	2003	
**John Winston Foran**	Liberal	Miramichi Centre	2003	
Bill Fraser	Liberal	Miramichi-Bay du Vin	2006	
John Betts	Progressive Conservative	Moncton Crescent	1999	
Bernard Lord	Progressive Conservative	Moncton East	1998	
Chris Collins (2007)	Liberal	Moncton East	2007	
Mike Murphy	Liberal	Moncton North	2003	Resigned in January 2010.
Joan MacAlpine-Stiles	Progressive Conservative	Moncton West	1999	
Joan MacAlpine-Stiles	Liberal	Moncton West	1999	
Cheryl Lavoie	Liberal	Nepisiguit	2006	
Keith Ashfield	Progressive Conservative	New Maryland-Sunbury West	1999	
Jack Carr (2008)	Progressive Conservative	New Maryland-Sunbury West	2008	
**Roland Haché**	Liberal	Nigadoo-Chaleur	1999	
Jody Carr	Progressive Conservative	Oromocto	1999	
**Wally Stiles**	Progressive Conservative	Petitcodiac	1999	
**Wally Stiles**	Liberal	Petitcodiac	1999	
**Mary Schryer**	Liberal	Quispamsis	2006	
Percy Mockler	Progressive Conservative	Restigouche-La-Vallée	1982, 1993	Resigned in fall 2008.
Burt Paulin (2009)	Liberal	Restigouche-La-Vallée	2003, 2009	Elected in 2009.
Bruce Fitch	Progressive Conservative	Riverview	2003	
Rose-May Poirier	Progressive Conservative	Rogersville-Kouchibouguac	1999	Resigned February 2010.
Margaret-Ann Blaney	Progressive Conservative	Rothesay	1999	
Roly MacIntyre	Liberal	Saint John East	1995, 2003	
**Ed Doherty**	Liberal	Saint John Harbour	2005	
Abel LeBlanc	Liberal	Saint John Lancaster	2003	
Trevor Holder	Progressive Conservative	Saint John Portland	1999	
**Stuart Jamieson**	Liberal	Saint John-Fundy	1987, 2003	
**Victor Boudreau**	Liberal	Shediac-Cap-Pélé	2004	
**Rick Brewer**	Liberal	Southwest Miramichi	2003	
Mike Olscamp	Progressive Conservative	Tantramar	2006	
Claude Landry	Progressive Conservative	Tracadie-Sheila	2006	
Larry Kennedy	Liberal	Victoria-Tobique	1987	
David Alward	Progressive Conservative	Woodstock	1999	
Carl Urquhart	Progressive Conservative	York	2006	
Kirk MacDonald	Progressive Conservative	York North	1999	

- **bold** denotes a member of the Executive Council of New Brunswick
- italics denotes a party leader
- † denotes the speaker

== Standings changes since the 2006 general election ==
Number of members per party by date	2006	2007			2008			2009	2010	
Number of members per party by date	Sep 18	Jan 31	Mar 5	Apr 17	Sep 8	Nov 3	Dec 22	Mar 9	Feb 9	Feb 28
Liberal	29		30	32				33	32	
Progressive Conservative	26	25		23	22	23	22			21
Total members	55	54	55		54	55	54	55	54	53
Vacant	0	1	0		1	0	1	0	1	2
Government Majority	3	4	5	9	10	9	10	11	10	11

=== Membership changes ===
- Bernard Lord, a Progressive Conservative, was first elected in a 1998 by-election and served as Premier of New Brunswick from 1999 to 2006. He resigned his Moncton East seat on January 31, 2007.
- Keith Ashfield, a Progressive Conservative, was first elected in the 1999 general election and served as deputy speaker from 1999 to 2003 and in the cabinet from 2003 to 2006. He resigned his New Maryland-Sunbury West seat on September 8, 2008 to seek election to the federal parliament.
1. December 22, 2008 Percy Mockler, Restigouche-la-Vallée was appointed to the Senate of Canada
2. February 9, 2010 Mike Murphy, Moncton North resigns his seat and cabinet post.
3. February 28, 2010 Rose-May Poirier, Rogersville-Kouchibouguac was appointed to the Senate of Canada

== See also ==
- 2006 New Brunswick general election
- Legislative Assembly of New Brunswick

== Notes ==
Preceded by 55th Assembly	New Brunswick Legislative Assemblies; 2006–2010	Succeeded by 57th Assembly
