= 2006 New Brunswick general election =

Canadian provincial election

- September 18, 2006

55 seats of the Legislative Assembly of New Brunswick 28 seats needed for a majority
- Turnout: 67.52%
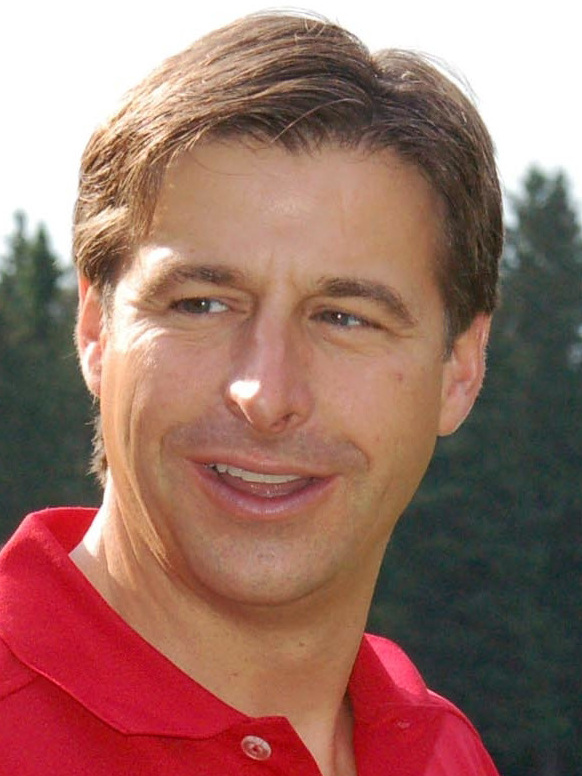

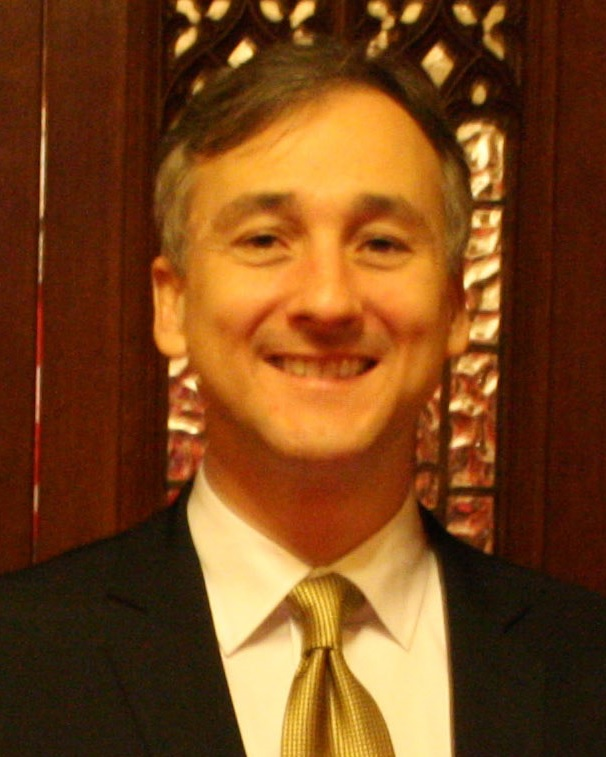
	First party	Second party	Third party
			NDP
Leader	Shawn Graham	Bernard Lord	Allison Brewer
Party	Liberal	Progressive Conservative	New Democratic
Leader since	2002	1997	2005
Leader's seat	Kent	Moncton East	Ran in Fredericton-Lincoln (lost)
Last election	26	28	1
Seats won	29	26	0
Seat change	▲3	▼2	▼1
Popular vote	176,410	177,744	19,212
Percentage	47.13%	47.49%	5.1%
Swing	▲2.7%	▲2.1%	▼4.6%
- Popular vote by riding. As this is an FPTP election, seat totals are not determined by popular vote, but instead via results by each riding.
Premier before election
Bernard Lord
Progressive Conservative
Premier after election
Shawn Graham
Liberal

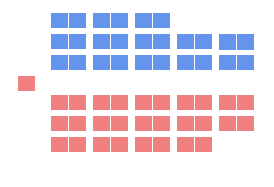
Rendition of party representation in the 56th New Brunswick Legislative Assembly decided by this election. Liberals (29) Progressive Conservatives (26)

The 2006 New Brunswick general election was held on September 18, 2006, to elect 55 members to the 56th New Brunswick Legislative Assembly, the governing house of the province of New Brunswick, Canada.

The campaign came earlier than expected: the incumbent Premier of New Brunswick, Bernard Lord, had pledged a vote would be held on October 15, 2007, but when the ruling Progressive Conservatives faced a loss of its majority in the legislature, Lord said he did not want to face a minority government and, moreover, feared that a by-election could tip the balance of power to the opposition Liberals.

The campaign was hard-fought with pundits and pollsters calling it too close to call throughout the five-week campaign. In the end, it was won by the Liberals led by Shawn Graham. The Liberals won 29 seats to 26 for the Progressive Conservatives, although the Progressive Conservatives won a plurality of the popular vote (47.5% to 47.2%).

Unusually, the Liberals won 17 of the 36 predominantly anglophone ridings, their best showing in a competitive election in English New Brunswick since the 1944 election. The Conservatives conversely did better than they have ever done while losing an election among Francophone ridings.

== Overview ==
Following the report of the Commission on Legislative Democracy in December 2004, which recommended fixed election dates beginning on October 15, 2007, Premier Bernard Lord pledged to introduce legislation fixing election dates, beginning on that date. Due to this, and because it is tradition in New Brunswick to hold elections every four years, the Progressive Conservative government and media had routinely referred to this as the "2007 election" through early 2006. The opposition Liberals however always pledged to try to force an early election.

From February through May 2006, it seemed possible that the Liberals might be successful in their goal as on February 17, 2006 Michael Malley left the Progressive Conservative caucus creating a minority government situation, Malley later became Speaker and, as Speaker, controversially rejoined the government caucus. The situation remained difficult for some time as the Liberals gained control of several key committees upon Malley's defection and would not return control to the government as they did not recognize Malley's change of affiliation while speaker. On May 30, 2006, the House reaffirmed its confidence in Malley in a vote and on May 31, 2006, the government and opposition announced a truce to allow the House to function more easily including a legislative calendar through 2007. As a result, it seemed unlikely that the government would fall prior to its chosen date to go to the polls.

However, Peter Mesheau, a Progressive Conservative MLA who had already announced that he would not run for re-election, said he would have to resign his seat as he had accepted a job in the private sector. Lord said that he would not face another hung parliament and announced on August 10, 2006, that he would seek an election date of September 18. On August 18, Lord asked Lieutenant-Governor Herménégilde Chiasson to dissolve the legislature and set the election date.

The emerging key issues of the campaign seem to be leadership and energy prices. The Progressive Conservatives have for some years questioned the leadership abilities of Shawn Graham, the leader of the opposition while the Liberals have been focusing on energy in general as a theme for some time. Moreover, energy has come to the forefront due to the introduction of gas price regulation by Lord's government on July 1, 2006, and the Liberals announced their energy platform prior to the beginning of the campaign.

This election was the first campaign since the 1987 election in which Elizabeth Weir did not lead the smaller social democratic New Democratic Party (NDP). In 2005, Weir stepped down after seventeen years as NDP leader. She was succeeded by Fredericton-based social activist Allison Brewer, who stood for election in the riding of Fredericton-Lincoln.

The Progressive Conservative party were again led by Bernard Lord and the Liberal Party by Shawn Graham.

The campaign was derided by journalists and political scientists as boring in part because much of the campaign was before Labour Day when many families were still taking summer holidays and also because the overall aspects of the two main parties were similar.

There were three English language debates and two French languages debates with some being declared draws, some wins for Lord and some wins for Graham by the experts. Opinion polls showed the Conservatives with a lead in the early days of the campaign but the last few weeks showed ties or slight edges to the Liberals within the margin of error.

On election day, Shawn Graham and the Liberals won the most seats, however, they lost the popular vote. Bernard Lord was the first premier not elected to a third term since Hugh John Flemming lost his bid for a third term in the 1960 election while the NDP suffered a considerable blow being shut out of the legislature despite having won a seat in 5 of the last 6 elections and seeing their popular vote slip 4% to their worst showing since the 1974 election.

=== Issues ===
The Fredericton Daily Gleaner reported on August 11, 2006, that they had asked the leaders of each party for what they thought the key issues of the campaign would be:

- Benard Lord, PC Leader: jobs, the economy, health care and senior care
- Shawn Graham, Liberal Leader: education, economic development and energy
- Allison Brewer, NDP Leader: high energy prices

An opinion poll, conducted for CTV Atlantic by the Innovative Research Group the last week of the campaign found the follow issues were top of mind for voters:

- Health Care (22%)
- Education (11%)
- Jobs/Unemployment (10%)
- Gas Prices/Oil (8%)
- Political Leaders/Leadership (4%)
- Senior Care/Nursing Homes (4%)
- Taxes/Taxation (3%)
- Cost of living/Inflation (3%)
- Social Issues (2%)

== Results ==
=== Results by party ===
Summary of the 2006 Legislative Assembly of New Brunswick election results
Party	Party leader	# of candidates	Seats				Popular vote		
Party	Party leader	# of candidates	2003	Dissolution	**Elected**	% Change	#	%	Change
Liberal	Shawn Graham	55	26	26	**29**	+11.5%	176,410	47.1%	+2.7%
Progressive Conservative	Bernard Lord	55	28	28	**26**	-7.1%	177,744	47.5%	+2.1%
New Democratic	Allison Brewer	48	1	0	**0**	-100%	19,212	5.1%	-4.6%
Independent		4	-	1	-		935	0.2%	+0.1%
**Total**		**162**	**55**	**55**	**55**	-	**374,301**	**100%**	
Source: http://www.gnb.ca/elections

Popular vote
PC	47.49%
Liberal	47.13%
New Democratic	5.13%
Others	0.25%

Seats summary
Liberal	52.73%
PC	47.27%

=== Results by region ===
Party Name		Central	North East	North West	South East	South West	Total
Liberal	Seats:	5	11	2	4	7	29
Liberal	Popular Vote:	46.0%	53.6%	41.6%	43.6%	48.5%	47.2%
Progressive; Conservative	Seats:	4	2	5	10	5	26
Progressive; Conservative	Popular Vote:	47.7%	40.2%	54.2%	53.0%	44.5%	47.5%
Total seats:		9	13	7	14	12	55
Parties that won no seats:
New; Democratic	Popular Vote:	6.3%	5.9%	4.2%	3.5%	6.0%	5.1%
Independents	Popular Vote:	-	0.3%	-	-	0.9%	0.2%

=== Results by riding ===
Many new and changed districts will be used for the first time in this election as a result of an electoral redistribution.

Legend

- **bold** denotes cabinet minister or party leader
- italics denotes a potential candidate who has not received his/her party's nomination
- † denotes an incumbent who is not running for re-election
- * denotes an incumbent seeking re-election in a new district

==== Northeast ====
Electoral district	Candidates				Incumbent
Electoral district	PC	Liberal	NDP	Other	Incumbent
1. Campbellton-Restigouche Centre	Greg Davis 3,248 (43.4%)	Roy Boudreau 4,232 (56.6%)			Roy Boudreau
2. Dalhousie-Restigouche East	Ronald Barriault 2,081 (25.9%)	Donald Arseneault 5,502 (68.5%)	Lyndsey Gallant 454 (5.6%)		Donald Arseneault
3. Nigadoo-Chaleur	Gérard Mallais 2,597 (35.7%)	Roland Haché 4,311 (59.5%)	Lucie Desaulnier 334 (4.6%)		Roland Haché
4. Bathurst	Nancy McKay 3,037 (46.1%)	Brian Kenny 3,224 (48.9%)	Blair Lindsay 328 (5.0%)		Brian Kenny
5. Nepisiguit	Gerry Legere 2,448 (42.3%)	Cheryl Lavoie 2,844 (49.2%)	Charles Fournier 489 (8.5%)		Frank Branch†
6. Caraquet	Claude L'Espérance 1,677 (23.2%)	Hédard Albert 4,580 (63.4%)	Stéphane Doiron 966 (13.4%)		Hédard Albert
7. Lamèque-Shippagan-Miscou	**Paul Robichaud** 4,348 (57.5%)	Denis Roussel 2,795 (37.0%)	Juliette Paulin 418 (5.5%)		**Paul Robichaud**
8. Centre-Péninsule-Saint-Sauveur	Louis-Philippe McGraw 3,235 (43.9%)	Denis Landry 4,142 (56.1%)			Denis Landry
9. Tracadie-Sheila	Claude Landry 4,043 (53.4%)	Serge Rousselle 3,281 (43.3%)		Stephane Richardson (Ind.) 250 (3.3%)	Elvy Robichaud†
10. Miramichi Bay-Neguac	Guy Vautour 1,963 (28.7%)	Carmel Robichaud 3,083 (45.1%)	Roger Duguay 1,791 (26.2%)		Carmel Robichaud
11. Miramichi-Bay du Vin	Michael Malley 2,720 (38.4%)	Bill Fraser 4,187 (59.1%)	Dwayne Hancock 181 (2.6%)		Michael Malley
12. Miramichi Centre	George Smith 2,732 (40.6%)	John Foran 3,747 (55.6%)	Douglas Mullin 258 (3.8%)		John Foran
13. Southwest Miramichi	Brent Taylor 2,844 (44.5%)	Rick Brewer 3,327 (52.1%)	Lydia Calhoun 217 (3.4%)		Rick Brewer

==== Southeast ====
Electoral district	Candidates				Incumbent
Electoral district	PC	Liberal	NDP	Other	Incumbent
14. Rogersville-Kouchibouguac	**Rose-May Poirier** 4,332 (55.5%)	Emery Comeau 3,112 (39.9%)	Oscar Doucet 356 (4.6%)		**Rose-May Poirier**
15. Kent	Aldéo Saulnier 3,060 (45.0%)	**Shawn Graham** 3,534 (51.9%)	Graham Cox 209 (3.1%)		**Shawn Graham**
16. Kent South	**Claude Williams** 4,890 (58.5%)	Nadine Hébert 3,463 (41.5%)			**Claude Williams**
17. Shediac-Cap-Pelé	Leo Doiron 3,639 (40.3%)	Victor Boudreau 5,116 (56.6%)	Richard Pellerin 283 (3.1%)		Victor Boudreau
18. Tantramar	Mike Olscamp 2,690 (54.4%)	John Higham 1,718 (34.7%)	Virgil Hammock 536 (10.8%)		Peter Mesheau†
19. Memramcook-Lakeville-Dieppe	Fortunat Duguay 2,680 (39.3%)	Bernard LeBlanc 3,845 (56.4%)	Carl Bainbridge 287 (4.2%)		new district
20. Dieppe Centre-Lewisville	Cy LeBlanc* 4,347 (48.8%)	Bruno Roy 4,289 (48.2%)	Valier Santerre 271 (3.0%)		new district
21. Moncton East	**Bernard Lord** 3,816 (54.8%)	Brian Gallant 2,827 (40.6%)	Mark Robar 319 (4.6%)		**Bernard Lord**
22. Moncton West	**Joan MacAlpine-Stiles** 3,317 (52.4%)	Gene Devereux 3,012 (47.6%)			**Joan MacAlpine-Stiles**
23. Moncton North	Marie-Claude Blais 2,469 (44.9%)	Mike Murphy 2,707 (49.2%)	Cindy Rix 326 (5.9%)		Mike Murphy
24. Moncton Crescent	John Betts 4,271 (54.6%)	Shirley Smallwood 3,278 (41.9%)	Ian Thorn 283 (3.6%)		John Betts
25. Petitcodiac	Wally Stiles 4,651 (65.0%)	Terry Keating 2,116 (29.6%)	Rebecca Lewis-Marshall 392 (5.5%)		Wally Stiles
26. Riverview	**Bruce Fitch** 4,326 (63.3%)	Ward White 2,302 (33.7%)	Richard Grant 202 (3.0%)		**Bruce Fitch**
27. Albert	**Wayne Steeves** 4,439 (70.0%)	Clark Butland 1,902 (30.0%)			**Wayne Steeves**

==== Southwest ====
Electoral district	Candidates				Incumbent
Electoral district	PC	Liberal	NDP	Other	Incumbent
28. Kings East	Bruce Northrup 4,071 (57.2%)	LeRoy Armstrong 2,798 (39.3%)	Dana Brown 248 (3.5%)		LeRoy Armstrong
29. Hampton-Kings	**Bev Harrison** 4,195 (58.6%)	Linda Watson 1,787 (25.0%)	Pat Hanratty 918 (12.8%)	John Sabine (Ind.) 255 (3.6%)	**Bev Harrison**
30. Quispamsis	**Brenda Fowlie** 3,108 (44.0%)	Mary Schryer 3,625 (51.3%)	Lorena Henry 334 (4.7%)		**Brenda Fowlie**
31. Saint John-Fundy	James Huttges 2,132 (37.8%)	Stuart Jamieson 3,124 (55.5%)	Mark LeBlanc 377 (6.7%)		Stuart Jamieson
32. Rothesay	Margaret-Ann Blaney 2,853 (48.6%)	Paul Barry 2,765 (47.1%)	Troy Polchies 249 (4.2%)		Margaret-Ann Blaney
33. Saint John East	Joe Mott 1,860 (32.9%)	Roly MacIntyre 3,406 (60.2%)	Maureen Michaud 394 (7.0%)		Roly MacIntyre
34. Saint John Harbour	Idee Inyangudor 1,139 (25.8%)	Ed Doherty 2,690 (60.9%)	Dan Robichaud 547 (12.4%)	David Raymond Amos (Ind.) 44 (1.0%)	Ed Doherty
35. Saint John Portland	**Trevor Holder** 2,987 (50.0%)	Colleen Knudson 2,710 (45.3%)	Claire Mudge 281 (4.7%)		**Trevor Holder**
36. Saint John Lancaster	Peter Hyslop 2,499 (36.8%)	Abel LeBlanc 4,002 (59.0%)	Jennifer Carkner 283 (4.2%)		Abel LeBlanc
37. Fundy-River Valley	Borden DeLong 2,594 (42.8%)	Jack Keir 2,793 (46.1%)	Percy Ward 285 (4.7%)	Colby Fraser (Ind.) 386 (6.4%)	Milt Sherwood†
38. Charlotte-The Isles	Wayne Sturgeon 2,627 (40.3%)	Rick Doucet 3,619 (55.6%)	Sharon Greenlaw 267 (4.1%)		Rick Doucet
38. Charlotte-The Isles	Wayne Sturgeon 2,627 (40.3%)	Rick Doucet 3,619 (55.6%)	Sharon Greenlaw 267 (4.1%)		merged district
38. Charlotte-The Isles	Wayne Sturgeon 2,627 (40.3%)	Rick Doucet 3,619 (55.6%)	Sharon Greenlaw 267 (4.1%)		Eric Allaby†
39. Charlotte-Campobello	Tony Huntjens 3,157 (50.0%)	Robert Tinker 2,875 (45.3%)	Andrew Graham 312 (4.9%)		Tony Huntjens

==== Central ====
Electoral district	Candidates				Incumbent
Electoral district	PC	Liberal	NDP	Other	Incumbent
40. Oromocto	**Jody Carr** 3,181 (66.4%)	Shelby Mercer 1,451 (30.3%)	Stephen Beam 157 (3.3%)		**Jody Carr**
41. Grand Lake-Gagetown	Jack Carr 3,324 (45.7%)	Eugene McGinley* 3,545 (48.7%)	Helen Partridge 412 (5.7%)		new district
42. Fredericton-Nashwaaksis	Mike Smith 3,698 (47.1%)	T.J. Burke* 3,855 (49.1%)	Aaron Doucette 304 (3.9%)		new district
43. Fredericton-Fort Nashwaak	Heather Hughes 2,800 (42.3%)	Kelly Lamrock 3,817 (57.7%)			T.J. Burke
43. Fredericton-Fort Nashwaak	Heather Hughes 2,800 (42.3%)	Kelly Lamrock 3,817 (57.7%)			merged district
43. Fredericton-Fort Nashwaak	Heather Hughes 2,800 (42.3%)	Kelly Lamrock 3,817 (57.7%)			Kelly Lamrock
44. Fredericton-Lincoln	William Forrestall 2,427 (35.5%)	Greg Byrne 3,354 (49.0%)	**Allison Brewer** 1,057 (15.5%)		new district
45. Fredericton-Silverwood	**Brad Green** 2,880 (40.1%)	Rick Miles 3,335 (47.4%)	Dennis Atchison 815 (11.6%)		**Brad Green**
46. New Maryland-Sunbury West	**Keith Ashfield** 3,222 (52.0%)	Les Smith 2,666 (43.0%)	Brecken Hancock 307 (5.0%)		**Keith Ashfield**
47. York	Carl Urquhart 3,100 (48.2%)	Trent Jewett 2,943 (45.8%)	Derek Simons 382 (5.9%)		Scott Targett†
48. York North	**Kirk MacDonald** 4,061 (55.7%)	Larry Jewett 2,854 (39.1%)	Anne Leslie 379 (5.2%)		**Kirk MacDonald**

==== Northwest ====
Electoral district	Candidates				Incumbent
Electoral district	PC	Liberal	NDP	Other	Incumbent
49. Woodstock	**David Alward** 3,867 (54.1%)	Art Slipp 2,936 (41.1%)	Garth Brewer 345 (4.8%)		**David Alward**
50. Carleton	**Dale Graham** 4,148 (64.1%)	Gwen Cullins-Jones 2,086 (32.2%)	Jason Robar 235 (3.6%)		**Dale Graham**
51. Victoria-Tobique	Chris McLaughlin 1,447 (25.6%)	Larry Kennedy 4,043 (71.6%)	Paul Kendal 153 (2.7%)		Larry Kennedy
52. Grand Falls-Drummond-Saint-André	Maurice Picard 2,733 (40.6%)	Ron Ouellette 3,752 (55.7%)	Pierre Cyr 254 (3.8%)		Ron Ouellette
53. Restigouche-La-Vallée	**Percy Mockler** 3,835 (53.0%)	Burt Paulin 2,806 (38.8%)	Alain Martel 599 (8.3%)		Burt Paulin
53. Restigouche-La-Vallée	**Percy Mockler** 3,835 (53.0%)	Burt Paulin 2,806 (38.8%)	Alain Martel 599 (8.3%)		merged district
53. Restigouche-La-Vallée	**Percy Mockler** 3,835 (53.0%)	Burt Paulin 2,806 (38.8%)	Alain Martel 599 (8.3%)		**Percy Mockler**
54. Edmundston-Saint-Basile	**Madeleine Dubé** 5,631 (71.6%)	Jean-Louis Johnson 2,000 (25.4%)	Michael Bosse 235 (3.0%)		**Madeleine Dubé**
55. Madawaska-les-Lacs	**Jeannot Volpé** 4,268 (63.2%)	Élaine Albert 2,297 (34.0%)	Jeff Thibodeau 183 (2.7%)		**Jeannot Volpé**

== Timeline ==
- October 8, 2004 - Elizabeth Weir resigns as leader of the New Brunswick NDP after leading her party through four elections.
- June 30, 2005 - The Electoral Boundaries and Representation Act is passed in the legislature, which sets forth a process under which the province will have new electoral districts.
- July 21, 2005 - Environment & Local Government Minister Brenda Fowlie resigns from cabinet after the provincial ombudsman finds she had violated the privacy act in revealing personal information about Liberal MLA Stuart Jamieson.
- September 25, 2005 - Allison Brewer is elected leader of the NDP at a leadership convention.
- October 13, 2005 - Elizabeth Weir resigns her seat in the legislature, a by-election is called two days later for November 14. The Tories and Liberals both announce high-profile candidates and the media speculates that the winner of the by-election will have the momentum going into the general election. Weir's NDP, which was caught without notice of her resignation, is expected by pundits to finish third.
- October 31, 2005 - Family and Community Services Minister Tony Huntjens resigns after revealing the identity of an autistic man who is a ward of his department to the media.
- November 14, 2005 - The Liberals win a by-election in a seat formerly held by NDP MLA Elizabeth Weir, defeating Conservative star candidate Michelle Hooton, who many considered the frontrunner, by a 2 to 1 margin.
- January 7, 2006 - Over the course of his beginning of year interviews, Lord reveals that he will introduce legislation fixing election dates, beginning with a date in 2007.
- February 14, 2006 - Lord announces a major cabinet shuffle moving over half of his ministers, changing several departments and dumping three of his most well-known ministers, two of whom say they are leaving as they will not be candidates in the next election. In the meantime, he adds former minister Brenda Fowlie back to cabinet and Speaker Bev Harrison who will have to resign from his non-partisan post.
- February 17, 2006 - Progressive Conservative Member of the Legislative Assembly (MLA) Michael Malley announces he will sit as an independent making the government a minority.
- March 28, 2006 -
  - Independent MLA Michael Malley is elected Speaker of the legislature. This makes the standings of the ordinarily voting members of the legislature 27 Progressive Conservatives, 26 Liberals, 1 Independent. Malley, as Speaker, would only vote in the case of a tie and, by tradition, would normally vote in favour of confidence motions. Thus an election at a time other than Lord's choosing is unlikely.
  - Finance Minister Jeannot Volpe introduces what he calls a "super good budget" in which the government provides tax credits for heating costs, eliminates the Harmonized Sales Tax from heating costs, regulates the prices of gasoline and home heating oil, personal and small business tax cuts, investments in struggling forestry companies, hiring 240 more teachers for the public school system and no longer using the value of the homes of seniors as an offset to the level of support they can receive in a nursing home.
- April 13, 2006 - Malley announces from the speaker's chair that he is rejoining the government caucus. Government House Leader Bev Harrison argues that this restores the government majority and that therefore, the Liberals should honour a previous agreement to preserve a working majority on committees of the whole. The Liberals argued that it is improper for a speaker to change his affiliation and refuse to recognize the government as a majority. The legislature becomes somewhat deadlocked as the government controls the primary debate of the chamber, but the opposition controls the votes at committees where legislation and budgetary estimates are approved.
- May 1, 2006 - The Liberals offer to end the growing deadlock in the legislature by having Malley resign the speakership and placing one of their own members up for election as speaker. Under such an arrangement, the Conservatives would have 28 voting members, the Liberals 25 and the one independent Frank Branch. In exchange for giving the government this working majority, they demand an election be held on September 25, 2006. Lord rejects this offer.
- May 30, 2006 - A Liberal motion to remove Malley from the speakership is defeated 27–25. The Liberals therefore accept the legitimacy of the Speaker becoming a member of the Progressive Conservative caucus.
- May 31, 2006 - Government House Leader Bev Harrison and Opposition House Leader Kelly Lamrock announce an agreement to end the stalemate in the House. The Liberals, again recognizing the government's majority, will pair with the Speaker in Committees of the Whole and will guarantee passage of the budget by June 16. In return, the government will allow the opposition to chair four committees, including a new committee on literacy, pass several opposition bills and hold fall sittings of the legislature.
- June 12, 2006 - Corporate Research Associates, which conducts a quarterly opinion poll in New Brunswick, releases a survey conducted May 17 to June 6 showing that the Progressive Conservatives have taken a lead over the Liberals for the first time since August 2003.
- June 20, 2006 - Lord announces he will introduce legislation fixing election dates on the third Monday of October beginning with an election on October 15, 2007.
- August 1, 2006 - The New Brunswick Telegraph-Journal reports that former minister Peter Mesheau is set to resign from the legislature which would cause another minority government. Lord says he will not face another minority and will call an election if this happens.
- August 8, 2006 - The Fredericton Daily Gleaner reports that Lord will meet Mesheau on August 11 and an election call is expected later that day.
- August 10, 2006 - Bernard Lord confirms that the election will be held on September 18, 2006, although an election call is not expected until August 19.
- August 14, 2006 - The Canadian Taxpayers Federation and the Liberals criticize Lord and his ministers for making election style announcements using government resources, something that would be forbidden after the election is formally called.
- August 16, 2006 - The Liberal Party begins airing television and radio commercials and erecting billboards.
- August 18, 2006 - Lord asks Lieutenant-Governor Herménégilde Chiasson to dissolve the legislature, one day earlier than he originally suggested he would catching the other parties off guard, and sets the election date for September 18.
- September 1, 2006 - Candidate nominations are due. The Liberals and Progressive Conservatives field full slates in all 55 ridings, while the NDP, with 48 candidates, fails to do so for the first time since 1982.
- September 5, 2006 - It is announced that Radio-Canada, the French language arm of CBC, will not provide simultaneous translation for NDP leader Allison Brewer in their televised debate. As a result, Brewer announces she will not participate, leaving only Bernard Lord and Shawn Graham in the French leader's debate. All three leaders will participate in the English debate. The NDP late files a complaint with the Radio-Canada ombudsman.
- September 7, 2006:
  - The Liberals release their election platform entitled "Charter for Change"
  - The three leaders participate in an English leaders' debate on CBC and PC leader Bernard Lord and Liberal leader Shawn Graham participate in a French leaders' debate on Radio-Canada (the French arm of CBC). Both were pre-taped and air simultaneously. Most pundits say that the debates will not sway many voters as there was no clear winner but some suggest Lord won the English debate while Graham won the French.
- September 9, 2006 - The first day of advanced polls.
- September 10, 2006 - Rogers Communications airs English and French debates live.
- September 11, 2006:
  - The NDP releases their platform "Clear Voice, Clear Choice".
  - The second and final day of advanced polls. It is later reported that there is a 50% increase in advanced voter turnout over 2003.
- September 12, 2006 - Corporate Research Associates releases a poll commissioned by L'Acadie Nouvelle which shows the Liberals at 44%, the PCs at 42% and the NDP at 10%.
- September 13, 2006 - The Progressive Conservatives release their platform "Getting Results Together".
- September 14, 2006 - Innovative Research Group releases a poll commissioned by CTV which shows the Liberals at 45%, the PCs at 43% and the NDP at 11%.
- September 15, 2006 - Omnifacts Bristol releases a poll showing the PCs and Liberals tied at 46% with the NDP at 7%.
- September 18, 2006 - Election Day, polls open at 10:00am local time and close at 8:00pm.
  - 8:51 PM: CTV Atlantic projects a Liberal majority government.
  - 8:54 PM: CBC projects a Liberal majority government.
- September 20, 2006 - Premier-designate Shawn Graham meets with outgoing Premier Bernard Lord and appoints a transition team. The team will be chaired by Doug Tyler and consist of Tyler, Allan Maher and Donald Savoie.
- October 3, 2006 - Graham and his cabinet are to be sworn in on this date.

== Political parties ==
- The ruling Progressive Conservative Party of New Brunswick (PC Party) sought a third mandate and try to secure a larger, more workable majority government. They held 28 of 55 seats prior to dissolution and were led by Premier Bernard Lord who was fighting his third election as leader. They won 26 seats in the election, becoming the official opposition.
  - The Conservatives used "Getting Results Together" for their campaign slogan.
- The opposition New Brunswick Liberal Association returned to power after suffering their worst ever defeat and winning only 10 seats in 1999 election, and after coming within 10 votes in the riding of Kennebecasis of tying the PCs with 27 seats each in the 2003 election. They held 27 of 55 seats prior to dissolution and were led by Shawn Graham, who will fight his second election as leader. They won 29 seats and formed the government.
  - The Liberals will be using "People for A Change" for their campaign slogan.
- The New Brunswick New Democratic Party (NDP) fought its first election without Elizabeth Weir as the leader in almost two decades. Many New Brunswickers viewed the NDP and Weir as interchangeable. Weir held the party's only seat in the legislature but she resigned and the Liberal won it in a by-election. The NDP elected Allison Brewer as their new leader on September 25, 2005, she tried to convince New Brunswickers that the NDP was not a one-woman-party. Whether she achieved that goal or not is impossible to tell, but the results of the election were disappointing for the NDP, they failed to win any seats and had their lowest showing in the popular vote (5.1%) since the 1974 election.
  - The NDP used "Clear Voice, Clear Choice" as their campaign slogan.

== Opinion polls ==
The only inter-election opinion polling regularly conducted in New Brunswick is by the Halifax, Nova Scotia-based Corporate Research Associates. Every CRA poll from the November 2003 to June 2006 showed the Liberals in the lead by varying amounts. However, their last pre-election poll, released on June 12, 2006, showed the Progressive Conservatives making a comeback with 45% to 39% for the Liberals and 9% for the NDP. The CRA poll conducted during the 2003 election campaign showed the Liberals and PCs tied at 41% each, the only polling company to predict the close result that became of that campaign.

Polls conducted during the election campaign - Figures represent decided voters

Polling firm	Dates	PC Party	Liberal	NDP
Omnifacts Bristol	September 10 to 13, 2006	46%	46%	7%
Innovative Research Group	September 8 to 10, 2006	43%	45%	11%
Corporate Research Associates	September 7 to 10, 2006	42%	44%	10%
Omnifacts Bristol*	September 5 to 7, 2006	50%	44%	5%
Corporate Research Associates	August 17 to August 30, 2006	45%	38%	10%
Omnifacts Bristol	August 22 to 24, 2006	46%	45%	8%

* This poll reused the same sample as the August 22–24 poll and is therefore not a random sampling and not technically an opinion poll.

== Bibliography ==
- ^{1}Davies, Carl. "Election Fever Hits Provincial Capital". Telegraph-Journal, August 1, 2006, pages A1, A8.
- ²Taylor, Mark. "Election Call Could Come Friday". The Daily Gleaner, August 8, 2006, pages A1-2.
