= 2008 New Brunswick electoral reform referendum =

A referendum on electoral reform was supposed to be held in the province of New Brunswick, Canada on May 12, 2008. The date was announced by Premier Bernard Lord on June 20, 2006 in announcing his response to the 2004 report of the Commission on Legislative Democracy. However, Lord and his Progressive Conservatives were defeated in the September 2006 election and the new Liberal government, which had always expressed skepticism about the model proposed by the Commission and its mandate opted not proceed with a referendum in an announcement on June 28, 2007.

The proposal was a mixed member proportional representation system where 36 members are elected to the Legislative Assembly of New Brunswick using first past the post single member ridings and 20 additional members elected from 4 regions, using closed lists, to ensure proportionality. The threshold for the top-up (levelling) seats was to be 5% of the provincial vote.

In October 2010, after the 2010 New Brunswick election, the group New Brunswickers For Proportional Representation was formed to push for the implementation of proportional representation as outlined by the Commission on Legislative Democracy.
