= 2006 New Brunswick electoral redistribution =

The 2006 New Brunswick electoral redistribution was undertaken as a result of legislation introduced by Bernard Lord, the Premier of New Brunswick, Canada, on June 9, 2005. The legislation establishes a statutory requirement for redistribution of electoral districts after every decennial Canadian census.

The redistribution process set out in the legislation took approximately six months to complete, and was overseen by an independent commission. The bill introduced by the government would have required that 55 ridings be maintained with populations varying between 75% and 110% of 1/55 of the provincial population. The Opposition Liberals expressed a desire for the commission to have greater flexibility either in the variance of the average population or in the number of districts. On June 30, 2005, an agreement was reached and the bill was amended to allow the commission to ignore population basis entirely in "extraordinary circumstances," but should strive to be within the range of 90% to 110% of the average population of 55 districts.

There was considerable work to be done as 35 out of the 55 districts that existed from the outset were outside of the +/- 10% range. This is due in part to the population shifts over the course of a decade, and because the requirement was +/- 25% during the previous redistribution.

In the end, the commission was able to maintain most districts in their same alignment by means of minor boundary adjustments. However, two sets of districts were merged and there were considerable changes of district boundaries in the cities Dieppe and Fredericton.

== Timeline ==
- June 9, 2005 - The Electoral Boundaries and Representation Act is introduced in the Legislative Assembly of New Brunswick.
- June 30, 2005 - The legislation is amended to alleviate Opposition concerns and passes.
- July 14, 2005 - The Legislative Administration Committee of the Legislative Assembly of New Brunswick meets and agrees to the seven members of the Commission. The names will not be made public until the nominees have agreed to appointment and the cabinet ratifies them.
- August 11, 2005 - Government House Leader Brad Green announces that cabinet has approved two co-chairs and five commissioners whose appointments will take effect on August 22.
- August 25, 2005 - The Commission concludes its first meeting at which the co-chairs express concern about the short time available for them to complete their report. They also announce that the first round of public hearings will be held in the month of October and that they will soon launch a website.
- September 20, 2005 - The commission announces the details of their first round of public hearings. They will visit 12 communities from October 11 to October 28.
- October 11, 2005 - Public hearings to assist the commission in the drafting of its preliminary report begin.
- November 21, 2005 - The commission files its preliminary report outlining a proposal for a new electoral map. As expected, there are significant changes to almost all districts, though most are kept as minor as possible with one new district added in each of the Fredericton and Moncton areas and one district lost in each of Charlotte County and the Madawaska-Restigouche area.
- February 20, 2006 - The commission files its final report, making changes to 20 of 55 ridings from its preliminary report. Individuals have 14 days to file an appeal to the final report but such an appeal must be signed by 2 members of the legislature. If an appeal is filed, the commission has 30 days to respond.
- March 24, 2006 - The commission announces that it received 15 valid notices of appeal within the 14-day public response period; it has reviewed them and completed its work. In the end it makes 3 minor changes to electoral districts. The legislature may now only make recommendations with respect to changing names of electoral districts; the boundaries cannot be changed until after the next census.

== Members of the Commission ==
=== Co-chairs ===
- Madam Justice Brigette Robichaud of Moncton. Justice Robichaud is a member of the Court of Queen's Bench of New Brunswick.
- Madam Justice Margaret Larlee of Fredericton. Justice Larlee was the first woman on the Court of Appeal of New Brunswick, New Brunswick's supreme court.

=== Commissioners ===
- David Brown of Saint John, legal counsel to the New Brunswick Union of Public and Private Employees.
- Normand Carrier of Edmundston, a former vice-president for the Edmundston campus of the Université de Moncton.
- Richard Myers of Fredericton, a former vice-president of St. Thomas University and current professor of political science at the same institution.
- Reginald Paulin of Lamèque a former mayor and school principal.
- Pam Ward of Red Bank First Nation, an active participant in New Brunswick aboriginal governance.

== Preliminary report ==
On November 21, 2005, the Commission released its preliminary recommendations for new electoral districts. Despite the fact that the vast majority of existing ridings were outside of the +/- 10% population range, most were retained in the new distribution through minor adjustments to their boundaries. In all, 46 of 55 districts are largely unchanged. There are five essentially new districts, three of which resulting from a merger of previous districts or large parts of previous districts.

Only one district was created using the "extraordinary circumstances" clause of the legislation which allows districts to be less than 90% of the provincial average population. This was the district of Tantramar, which is an anglophone area surrounded by water, Nova Scotia and francophone areas. The Commission argued that the only way to maintain a community of interest was to leave the boundaries as they were. The districts of Nigadoo-Chaleur, Saint John Lancaster and Saint John Portland were the only others to have no changes whatsoever to their boundaries.

These proposals will be taken to the public in a series of hearings in January 2006, and may be subject to change before the commission tables its final report on February 18, 2006.

† represents a proposal that was altered in the final report

=== New districts ===
Name of district	Description of district
Codiac†	This district is created by taking a large part of the old Dieppe-Memramcook district as well as significant parts of Moncton East and Moncton Crescent
Dieppe-Memramcook†	The old district of Dieppe-Memramcook was the largest in the province and over 50% above the maximum population. Though maintaining the same name, this district loses almost half of the city of Dieppe to the new Codiac district
Fredericton-Lincoln	The southern half of Fredericton-Fort Nashwaak merged with a small part of Fredericton South and part of New Maryland
Grand Lake-Gagetown	The old Grand Lake, less those parts near suburban Fredericton, and approximately a third of the old district of Oromocto-Gagetown
Nashwaaksis†	Approximately half of the old district of Fredericton North and small parts of Mactaquac

=== Merged districts ===
Name of district	Description of district
Charlotte-The Isles	A merger of most of Charlotte with Fundy Isles, less Campobello Island
Fredericton-Fort Nashwaak	Despite sharing the same name with the existing Fredericton-Fort Nashwaak district, this is a much different riding. It is a merger of the eastern half of Fredericton North with the northern half of Fredericton-Fort Nashwaak
Madawaska-Restigouche†	A merger of most of Madawaska-la-Vallée with most of Restigouche West

=== Largely unchanged districts ===
Though these districts were all largely unchanged from their previous form, some new names have been recommended due to subtle community changes as a result of minor boundary changes or for other reasons. These districts are denoted by an asterisk (*).

Name of district	Changes
Albert	Gains and loses different parts of territory to and from Riverview
Bathurst	Loses territory to Nepisiguit
Campbellton†	Gains parts of Restigouche West while losing territory to Dalhousie-Restigouche East
Caraquet	Gains territory from Centre-Péninsule and Nepisiguit
Carleton†	Loses small parts to Victoria-Tobique
Centre-Péninsule	Gains territory from Lamèque-Shippagan-Miscou, Nepisiguit and Tracadie-Sheila while losing territory to Caraquet
Charlotte-Campobello*	This district maintains most of the territory of Western Charlotte but also gains Campobello Island
Dalhousie-Restigouche East	Gains parts of Campbellton and Restigouche West
Edmundston-Saint Basile*	The existing district of Edmundston plus part of the old district of Madawaska-la-Vallée
Fredericton-Odell*†	This is district is largely the same as the old Fredericton South district losing small parts of territory to Fredericton-Lincoln and gaining small parts from New Maryland
Grand Bay-Westfield	Gains those parts of Saint John County currently in Charlotte
Grand Falls*†	The old Grand Falls Region district, less small amounts of territory lost to Victoria-Tobique plus portions of Madawaska-la-Vallée with the district name changed to the less cumbersome though somewhat less appropriate Grand Falls
Hampton-Belleisle	Loses territory to Kings East while gaining from Kennebecasis and Saint John-Fundy
Kent	Loses territory to Rogersville-Kouchibouguac while gaining territory from Kent South
Kent South	Loses territory to Kent and Petitcodiac while gaining from Shediac-Cap-Pelé and Moncton Crescent
Kings East	Loses territory to Petitcodiac and gains territory from Hampton-Belleisle
Lamèque-Shippagan-Miscou	Loses territory to Centre-Péninsule
Mactaquac	This district gains significant population from the town of Nackawic area from the riding of York while losing small territory to Nashwaaksis and Southwest Miramichi
Madawaska-les-Lacs	Gains parts of the old district of Madawaska-la-Vallée
Miramichi Centre	Loses parts to Southwest Miramichi and renamed Miramichi-Neguac district, while gaining part of Miramichi-Bay du Vin
Miramichi-Bay du Vin	Loses parts to Miramichi Centre
Miramichi-Neguac*†	Miramichi Bay gains territory from Miramichi Centre while losing territory to Tracadie-Sheila. As it is losing some of the territory around Miramichi Bay, the name change is proposed
Moncton Crescent†	Gains territory from Moncton North while losing territory to Codiac, Kent South and Petitcodiac
Moncton East†	Loses territory to Codiac while gaining territory from Moncton North and Moncton South
Moncton North†	Loses territory to Moncton East and Moncton Crescent
Moncton South†	Loses territory to Moncton East
Nepisiguit	Loses territory to Centre-Péninsule and Caraquet while gaining from Bathurst
New Maryland†	Loses territory to both Fredericton-Odell and Fredericton-Lincoln
Nigadoo-Chaleur	completely unchanged
Oromocto*	The Oromocto-Gagetown district less territory lost to the new Grand Lake-Gagetown district
Petitcodiac†	Gains territory from Grand Lake, Kings East, Moncton Crescent and Kent South
Quispamsis*	The district of Kennebecasis loses the small amounts of territory outside of the town of Quispamsis and accordingly changes its name to the same
Riverview	Gains and loses different parts of territory to and from Albert
Rogersville-Kouchibouguac	Gains territory from both Miramichi Centre and Kent
Rothesay-Kings*†	Saint John-Kings loses most of the city of Saint John that lies within its boundaries to Saint John-Fundy and the renamed Saint John East districts and changes its name to reflect the importance of the town of Rothesay and the fact that little of Saint John remains
Saint John East*	The district of Saint John Champlain gains territory from Saint John-Kings and loses territory to Saint John Harbour while its name is changed to better reflect its communities
Saint John Harbour†	Gains territory from Saint John Champlain
Saint John Lancaster	completely unchanged
Saint John Portland†	completely unchanged
Saint John-Fundy†	Loses territory to Hampton-Belleisle while gaining from Saint John-Kings
Shediac-Cap-Pelé	Loses territory to Dieppe-Memramcook and Kent South
Southwest Miramichi	Gains parts of Mactaquac and Miramichi Centre
Tantramar	Despite being smaller than the 10% of the provincial average, this district is unchanged under the "extraordinary circumstances" clause of the Act due to its being an Anglophone area completely surrounded by Francophones
Tracadie-Sheila	Loses territory to Centre-Péninsule while gaining from Miramichi Bay
Victoria-Tobique†	Gains small parts of Carleton and Grand Falls Region
Woodstock†	This district loses that part of York County within its boundaries to York
York†	Loses territory to Mactaquac while gaining approximately equal amounts from Woodstock

== Final report ==
The commission released its final report on February 20, 2006. The commission altered the boundaries of 20 of the 55 districts from its proposals in its preliminary report, though many of the changes were minor. It also changed the proposed names of three districts whose boundaries remained the same as in the preliminary report.

There was some question as to whether or not these boundaries will be used in the next general election, there has been much media speculation that the government may fall by April 7, 2006, which would be just two days after the period for appeal of the commission's work will have ended. Government House Leader Bev Harrison has suggested that should the government fall then, it would be unlikely for the government to enact the regulation required to finalize the new boundaries so as to prevent confusion for voters and party officials. The Opposition House Leader, Kelly Lamrock, has suggested he would agree with such a move. However, Premier Bernard Lord went on to say that the boundaries would be used if at all possible as they are more equitable than the old boundaries. The election was not held, however, until September, and these boundaries were used.

=== Changes only in the name of the district ===
- The district proposed as Miramichi-Neguac will retain its existing name of Miramichi Bay.
- The district proposed as Nashwaaksis will be called Fredericton-Nashwaaksis to be consistent with the names of the other Fredericton districts.
- The district proposed as Fredericton-Odell will be called Fredericton-Silverwood instead.

=== Districts with minor boundary changes ===
- The proposed Campbellton district, will lose largely unpopulated territory in southern Restigouche County primarily to ensure that Mount Carleton Provincial Park is contained wholly in one district. The name of the district will be changed to Campbellton-Restigouche Centre to reflect its inclusion of communities outside of the immediate area of the city of Campbellton.
- The proposed Kent South district undergoes minor changes as a result of more major changes in the Moncton and Dieppe districts.
- The proposed Moncton South district undergoes minor changes as a result of changes in neighbouring districts.
- The proposed Moncton North district undergoes minor changes as a result of changes in neighbouring districts.
- The proposed Moncton Crescent district undergoes minor changes to reflect communities of interest.
- The proposed Petitcodiac district undergoes minor changes to reflect communities of interest.
- The proposed Saint John-Fundy district undergoes minor changes to reflect communities of interest.
- The proposed Rothesay-Kings district undergoes minor changes to reflect communities of interest and takes on the simplified name of Rothesay.
- The proposed Saint John Harbour district undergoes minor changes as a result of changes in neighbouring districts.
- The proposed Saint John Portland district undergoes minor changes as a result of changes in neighbouring districts.
- The proposed New Maryland district undergoes minor changes as a result of changes in neighbouring districts.
- The proposed Grand Falls district undergoes minor changes to reflect communities of interest and has its name changed to Grand Falls-Drummond-Saint-André.
- The proposed Madawaska-Restigouche district undergoes minor changes to reflect communities of interest and has its name changed to Restigouche-La-Vallée.

=== Substantial changes from the preliminary report ===
- Dieppe-Memramcook losses all but a small portion of Dieppe and takes on the name of Memramcook-Lakeville-Dieppe to differentiate it from the old Dieppe-Memramcook riding and also to recognize the addition of the Lakeville community from Moncton Crescent.
- The proposed district of Codiac is changed significantly and takes on the name of Dieppe Centre. Instead of being a district half of Dieppe and a part of Moncton, it now takes on about 4/5ths of Dieppe and only a small portion of Moncton.
- Moncton East regains most of its territory that was to have gone to the proposed Codiac district.
- York loses most of the territory it was proposed to gain from Woodstock.
- Woodstock largely retains its existing form despite the original proposal.
- Carleton regains most of the territory that was proposed as going to Victoria-Tobique.
- Victoria-Tobique gains much less from Carleton County than was proposed.

== Appeals to the final report ==
The legislation governing the electoral district reform process allowed for appeals to the final report which were signed by two members of the legislature. The commission received 15 such appeals.

After considering the appeals, the commission discarded most of them saying that the appeals did not provide further justification beyond those arguments that they had already rejected or that accepting the changes would cause a domino effect requiring a massive redrawing of the boundaries.

They did however accept three appeals:

- Seal Island had been omitted from the original report and would now be added to the district of Charlotte-The Isles
- The village of Norton had argued that its community of interest required it to be in the district of Hampton-Belleisle, as it had been originally, as opposed to the district of Kings East as recommended by the commission. The commission decided to place those parts of Norton north of the Kennebecasis River in Hampton-Belleisle and those parts south of the river in Kings East.
- The community of Saint-Léonard-Parent was included in the district of Grand Falls-Drummond-Saint-André while Saint-Léonard was in the district of Restigouche-la-Vallée; the appellant argued that both communities should be in the same district. As a result, the commission moved Saint-Léonard-Parent to the district of Restigouche-la-Vallée but this caused the Grand Falls-Drummond-Saint-André district to become too small in terms of population so part of California Settlement was moved from Victoria-Tobique to Grand Falls-Drummond-Saint-André.

== District name changes ==
The Electoral Boundaries and Representation Act forbade the Legislative Assembly from making any changes to the boundaries of electoral districts, but it did allow MLAs to change their names. On May 12, 2006, the Legislature decided to make several changes as follows:

Name proposed by Commission	Name as changed by Assembly
Centre-Peninsule	Centre-Peninsule-Saint-Saveur
Dieppe Centre	Dieppe Centre-Lewisville
Grand Bay-Westfield	Fundy-River Valley
Hampton-Belleisle	Hampton-Kings
Mactaquac	York North
Miramichi Bay	Miramichi Bay-Neguac
Moncton South	Moncton West
New Maryland	New Maryland-Sunbury West

Preceded by 1994	New Brunswick electoral redistributions	Succeeded by 2013
