= Milton Sherwood =

Canadian politician

Milton A. Sherwood (born January 28, 1939, in Upham, New Brunswick) is a former politician in the Province of New Brunswick, Canada. In the early 1960s, he moved to Westfield, New Brunswick, where he operated a printing business for many years.

Sherwood studied at the University of New Brunswick in Fredericton, graduating in 1963 with a Bachelor of Business Administration degree. A member of the Progressive Conservative Party, he was elected to the Legislative Assembly of New Brunswick in 1995, 1999 and 2003.

In opposition from 1995 to 1999, he served as critic for various departments and served from 1997 to 1998 as house leader under Elvy Robichaud.

Following the 1999 election, he served in the cabinet first as Minister of Agriculture and then, when that department was merged into the Department of Agriculture, Fisheries and Aquaculture he served as minister of public safety. He was dropped from the cabinet in a 2001 cabinet shuffle and though re-elected in 2003, he did not run for re-election in 2006.

Sherwood married Lois Lingley.

New Brunswick provincial government of Bernard Lord
Cabinet posts (2)
| Predecessor | Office | Successor |
| Percy Mockler | Minister of Public Safety; 2000–2001; Mockler served as Solicitor General | Margaret-Ann Blaney |
| Stuart Jamieson | Minister of Agriculture and Rural Development; 1999–2000; Robichaud served as Minister of Agriculture, Fisheries & Aquaculture | Paul Robichaud |
