= Restigouche-La-Vallée =

Defunct provincial electoral district in New Brunswick, Canada

New Brunswick electoral district
- Coordinates: 47.588°N 67.503°W

Defunct provincial electoral district
- Legislature: Legislative Assembly of New Brunswick
- District created: 2006
- District abolished: 2013
- First contested: 2006
- Last contested: 2010

Restigouche-La-Vallée was a provincial electoral district in New Brunswick, Canada. It was created in 2006 as a result of a merger of the old district of Madawaska-la-Vallée with the district of Restigouche West, less small portions on the extreme edges of both districts.

== History ==
The district was first used in the 2006 provincial general election and featured a battle of incumbents. Percy Mockler, the Progressive Conservative MLA from Madawaska-la-Vallée defeated Burt Paulin, the Liberal MLA from Restigouche West.

On December 18, 2008, Percy Mockler was appointed to the Senate of Canada on the advice of Prime Minister of Canada Stephen Harper. As a result, a by-election was to be called no later than May 2009.

Premier of New Brunswick Shawn Graham called the by-election on February 6, 2009, and the vote was held March 9, 2009. The Progressive Conservative candidate was Jean-Paul Soucy, the only one to come forward and a former aide to Mockler, and the Liberal candidate was former Restigouche West MLA Burt Paulin. The NDP candidate was Alain Martel.

One local campaign issue concerned whether and how much government should support the forestry company J. D. Irving. Former PC leader and nearby MLA Jeannot Volpé criticized the Liberal government for being too supportive of the company, which is a major employer in the riding of Restigouche-La Vallée. Conservative candidate Jean-Paul Soucy indicated that he disagreed with Volpé's position, while Liberal candidate Burt Paulin said he was surprised that Volpé would criticize one of the largest employers in the region.

== Members of the Legislative Assembly ==
Assembly	Years	Member	Party
Riding created from Madawaska-la-Vallée and Restigouche West
56th	2006–2009	Percy Mockler	Progressive Conservative
56th	2009–2010	Burt Paulin	Liberal
57th	2010–2014	Martine Coulombe	Progressive Conservative
Riding dissolved into Restigouche West, Edmundston-Madawaska Centre, Victoria-la-Vallée and Madawaska-les-Lacs-Edmundston

== Election results ==
2010 New Brunswick general election
Party	Candidate	Votes	%	±%
Progressive Conservative	Martine (Valcourt) Coulombe	3,727	53.49	+15.31
Liberal	Burt Paulin	2,489	35.72	-17.58
New Democratic	Alain Martel	550	7.89	-0.63
Green	André Arpin	202	2.90	–
Total valid votes		6,968	100.0	
Total rejected ballots		115	1.62	
Turnout		7,083	75.45	
Eligible voters		9,388		
Progressive Conservative gain from Liberal		Swing		+16.44

New Brunswick provincial by-election, 2009
Party	Candidate	Votes	%	±%
Liberal	Burt Paulin	3,196	53.30	+14.54
Progressive Conservative	Jean-Paul Soucy	2,289	38.18	-14.79
New Democratic	Alain Martel	511	8.52	+0.25
Total votes		5,996	100.0	
Liberal gain from Progressive Conservative		Swing		+14.66

2006 New Brunswick general election
Party	Candidate	Votes	%	±%
Progressive Conservative	Percy Mockler	3,835	52.97	
Liberal	Burt Walter Paulin	2,806	38.76	
New Democratic	Alain Martel	599	8.27	
Total valid votes		7,240	100.0	
Progressive Conservative notional gain		Swing		
This was the first election in which the district was contested. It resulted from a merger of two districts, one of which had previously voted Progressive Conservative, electing Mockler, and one of which had previously voted Liberal, electing Paulin. Vote totals cannot be reasonably compared with those of the previous election.

== See also ==
- List of New Brunswick provincial electoral districts
- Canadian provincial electoral districts
