= Burt Paulin =

Canadian politician

Burt Paulin (born August 13, 1955) is a Canadian politician in New Brunswick.

Born in Montreal, Quebec, Paulin's family moved to Saint-Jean-Baptiste-de-Restigouche when he was four months old. He married Carolle Mallais.

Burt Paulin was elected to the Legislative Assembly of New Brunswick in 2003 to represent the electoral district of Restigouche West. In early 2006, electoral boundaries were redrawn and Paulin's district was merged with Madawaska-la-Vallée to form Restigouche-la-Vallée.

As a result, Paulin, a Liberal, faced off against long time Progressive Conservative legislator Percy Mockler in the 2006 election. Mockler defeated Paulin.

Mockler was appointed to the Senate of Canada in late 2008, and a by-election was held in early 2009. Paulin stood again for the Liberals and was re-elected.

He is the author of a book, Quelques notes historiques sur Olivier, about the history of the Saint-Jean-Baptiste-de-Restigouche area.

Paulin is chair of the combined advisory committee serving the local service districts of Menneval and St. Jean-Baptiste de Restigouche, also serving as an LSD representative on the board of directors of the Chaleur Regional Service Commission.

Preceded by Cheryl Lavoie	Chair of the Liberal caucus 2010	Succeeded by Roger Melanson
