= Department of Social Development (New Brunswick) =

Government institution

Agency overview
- Jurisdiction: New Brunswick
- Parent department: Government of New Brunswick

The Department of Family and Community Services is a part of the Government of New Brunswick, in Canada. It is charged with the administration of the province's social welfare and nursing home programs. On December 19, 2007, legislation was introduced to change its name to the Department of Social Development.

The department was established on March 23, 2000 when Premier Bernard Lord restructured the New Brunswick Cabinet. It was created merging the former Department of Income Assistance with parts of the Department of Municipalities and Housing and the Department of Health and Community Services.

Beginning in 2016, two ministers were named to jointly administer the department, a Minister of Families and Children and a Minister of Seniors and Long-Term Care.

== Ministers of Social Development ==
#	Minister	Term	Administration
1.	Percy Mockler	March 23, 2000 - October 9, 2001	under Bernard Lord
2.	Joan MacAlpine	October 9, 2001 - June 27, 2003	under Bernard Lord
3.	Tony Huntjens	June 27, 2003 - October 31, 2005	under Bernard Lord
	Joan MacAlpine-Stiles (acting)	October 31, 2005 - February 14, 2006	under Bernard Lord
4.	Madeleine Dubé	February 14, 2006 - October 3, 2006	under Bernard Lord
5.	Carmel Robichaud	October 3, 2006 - October 31, 2007	under Shawn Graham
6.	Mary Schryer	October 31, 2007 - June 22, 2009	under Shawn Graham
7.	Kelly Lamrock	June 22, 2009 - September 27, 2010	under Shawn Graham
8.	Sue Stultz	October 12, 2010 - October 9, 2012	under David Alward
9.	Madeleine Dubé	October 9, 2012 – October 7, 2014	under David Alward
10.	Cathy Rogers	October 7, 2014 - June 6, 2016	Brian Gallant
see Minister of Families and Children and Minister of Seniors and Long-Term Care
11.	Dorothy Shephard	November 9, 2018 - September 29, 2020	Blaine Higgs
12.	Bruce Fitch	September 29, 2020 - July 15, 2022	Blaine Higgs
13.	Dorothy Shephard	July 15, 2022 - June 15, 2023	Blaine Higgs

== Ministers of Families and Children ==
At a 2016 cabinet shuffle, the government announced that the Department of Social Development would remain as a single department with a single deputy minister and senior management team but that the department would be jointly administered by two cabinet ministers. The minister of families and children is responsible for child welfare and youth services, income security, housing services and wellness.

#	Minister	Term	Administration
1.	Stephen Horsman	June 6, 2016 - November 9, 2018	Brian Gallant

== Ministers of Seniors and Long-Term Care ==
At a 2016 cabinet shuffle, the government announced that the Department of Social Development would remain as a single department with a single deputy minister and senior management team but that the department would be jointly administered by two cabinet ministers. The minister of seniors and long-term care is responsible for long-term care, nursing home services and the council on aging.

#	Minister	Term	Administration
1.	Lisa Harris	June 6, 2016 - November 9, 2018	Brian Gallant
