= Hampton-Kings =

Defunct provincial electoral district in New Brunswick, Canada

New Brunswick electoral district
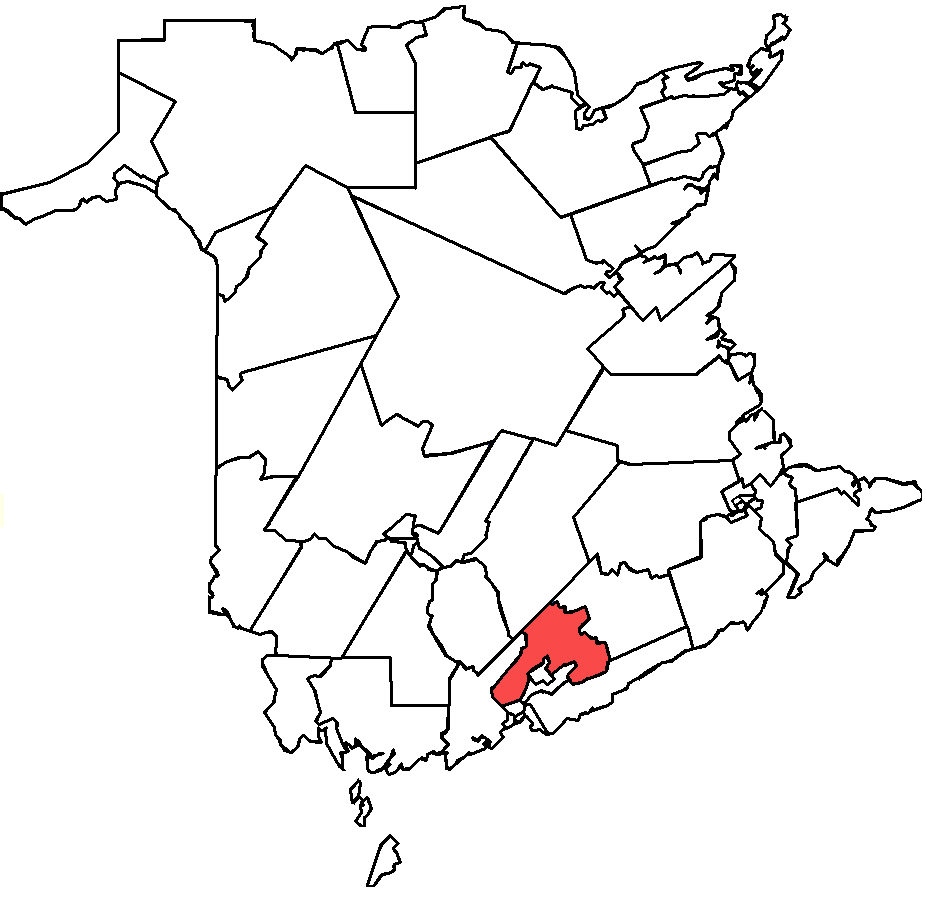
- Hampton-Kings in relation to other New Brunswick Provincial electoral districts
- Coordinates: 45.484°N 65.921°W

Defunct provincial electoral district
- Legislature: Legislative Assembly of New Brunswick
- District created: 1994
- District abolished: 2013
- First contested: 1995
- Last contested: 2010

Demographics
- Population (): 14,470
- Census division: Kings County
- Census subdivision(s): Hampton, Norton

Hampton-Kings was a provincial electoral district for the Legislative Assembly of New Brunswick, Canada. It was established in the 1994 electoral redistribution, in 2006 its boundaries were changed as its population was above the allowable reasonable population and its name was changed from Hampton-Belleisle to Hampton-Kings.

== Members of the Legislative Assembly ==
Assembly	Years	Member	Party
Hampton-Belleisle; Riding created from Kings Centre and Kings West
53rd	1995–1999	Georgie Day	Liberal
54th	1999–2003	Bev Harrison	Progressive Conservative
55th	2003–2006	Bev Harrison	Progressive Conservative
Hampton-Kings
56th	2006–2010	Bev Harrison	Progressive Conservative
57th	2010–2014	Bev Harrison	Progressive Conservative
Riding dissolved into Hampton, Kings Centre; Sussex-Fundy-St. Martins and Gagetown-Petitcodiac

== Election results ==
=== Hampton-Kings ===
2010 New Brunswick general election
Party	Candidate	Votes	%	±%
Progressive Conservative	Bev Harrison	4,302	57.49	-1.22
Liberal	Kit Hickey	1,668	22.29	-2.59
New Democratic	Julie Drummond	1,193	15.94	+3.14
Green	Pierre Roy	320	4.28	–
Total valid votes		7,483	100.0	
Total rejected ballots		46	0.61	
Turnout		7,529	68.66	
Eligible voters		10,965		
Progressive Conservative hold		Swing		+0.69
Source: Elections New Brunswick

2006 New Brunswick general election
Party	Candidate	Votes	%	±%
Progressive Conservative	Bev Harrison	4,188	58.71	+14.50
Liberal	Linda Watson	1,775	24.88	-10.78
New Democratic	Pat Hanratty	915	12.83	-4.58
Independent	John Sabine	255	3.57	–
Total valid votes		7,133	100.0	
Progressive Conservative hold		Swing		+12.64

=== Hampton-Belleisle ===
2003 New Brunswick general election
Party	Candidate	Votes	%	±%
Progressive Conservative	Bev Harrison	3,392	44.21	-13.05
Liberal	Bob Bates	2,736	35.66	+2.60
New Democratic	Pat Hanratty	1,336	17.41	+7.73
Grey	John Hughes	208	2.71	–
Total valid votes		7,672	100.0	
Progressive Conservative hold		Swing		-7.82

1999 New Brunswick general election
Party	Candidate	Votes	%	±%
Progressive Conservative	Bev Harrison	4,551	57.26	+19.64
Liberal	Georgie Day	2,628	33.06	-10.83
New Democratic	Jocelyne Comeau	769	9.68	-3.36
Total valid votes		7,948	100.0	
Progressive Conservative gain from Liberal		Swing		+15.24

1995 New Brunswick general election
Party	Candidate	Votes	%	±%
Liberal	Georgie Day	3,310	43.89	
Progressive Conservative	Ronald Hatfield	2,837	37.62	
New Democratic	Shirley Short	870	13.04	
Confederation of Regions	Ben Macaulay	456	6.83	
Natural Law	Neil Dickie	69	1.03	
Total valid votes		7,542	100.0	

== See also ==
- List of New Brunswick provincial electoral districts
- Canadian provincial electoral districts
