= Peter Mesheau =

Canadian politician

Peter Mesheau (born in Sackville, New Brunswick) is a politician in New Brunswick, Canada. He represented the electoral district of Tantramar in the Legislative Assembly of New Brunswick from 1997 to 2006.

Mesheau was elected in a tight three-way race to represent Tantramar in a by-election in 1997 to replace Marilyn Trenholme Counsell who had resigned to become Lieutenant-Governor of New Brunswick. Mesheau, a Progressive Conservative received 34.1% of the vote to 33.2% for Liberal candidate Ross Monk to 30.2% for New Democrat Heather Patterson. The leader of the Confederation of Regions Party, Greg Hargrove, was running as a parachute candidate and finished a distant fourth and last place with 2.5%. The margin of victory between Mesheau and Monk was only 39 votes.

Mesheau's victory happened in the midst of a leadership campaign for his party which was won shortly thereafter by Bernard Lord whom Mesheau supported. As a result, Mesheau was appointed to the high-profile role of Health Critic in the shadow cabinet.

The Progressive Conservatives won the 1999 provincial election and Mesheau was named to the cabinet as Minister of Economic Development, Tourism and Culture. Lord restructured the government in 2000 and Mesheau took over the new Department of Investments and Exports. In October 2001 Mesheau was promoted to the high-profile position of finance minister. Following the 2003 election, Mesheau was shuffled to Business New Brunswick, another department which had been carved out of his old Economic Development portfolio and one which had since annexed his old Investment and Exports department.

In February 2006, he left the cabinet altogether as a part of a shuffle in anticipation for the 56th New Brunswick general election. Mesheau said he had left willingly as he did not intend to run for another term. Later in 2006, Mesheau became a part of a media frenzy when it was learned that he had found a job in the private sector and intended to resign his seat in the legislature. His resignation would create a minority government and Lord said he would call an election - 13 months earlier than scheduled - rather than face a hung parliament.

The election was held on September 18, 2006 and though the Progressive Conservatives lost the government to the Liberals, the Tories retained Mesheau's Tantramar riding electing Mike Olscamp.

== Sources ==
- Mesheau's government bio
- Results of the 1997 Tantramar by-election
- CBC News, February 14, 2006: Lord's cabinet gets a facelift
- CBC News, August 8, 2006: N.B. election could be as soon as Sept. 18: Premier

New Brunswick provincial government of Bernard Lord
Cabinet posts (4)
Predecessor	Office	Successor
Norman Betts	Minister of Business New Brunswick; 2003–2006	Kirk MacDonald
Norman Betts	Minister of Finance; 2001–2003	Jeannot Volpé
himself	Minister of Investments and Exports; 2000–2001; Mesheau was previously Minister of Economic Development, Tourism & Culture out of which this department was created, Betts served as Minister of Business New Brunswick into which this department was merged	Norman Betts
Roly MacIntyre	Minister of Economic Development, Tourism and Culture; 1999–2000; MacAlpine became Minister of Business New Brunswick; Mesheau became Minister of Investments & Exports; Robichaud served as Minister responsible for Culture & Sport	Joan MacAlpine, Elvy Robichaud and himself
Special Cabinet Responsibilities
Predecessor	Title	Successor
Bernard Lord	Minister responsible for eNB; 2003–2006 designation discontinued	None
Bernard Lord	Minister responsible for the Service New Brunswick; 2000–2001	Norman Betts
