= Percy Mockler =

Canadian politician (born 1949)

The Honourable Percy Mockler
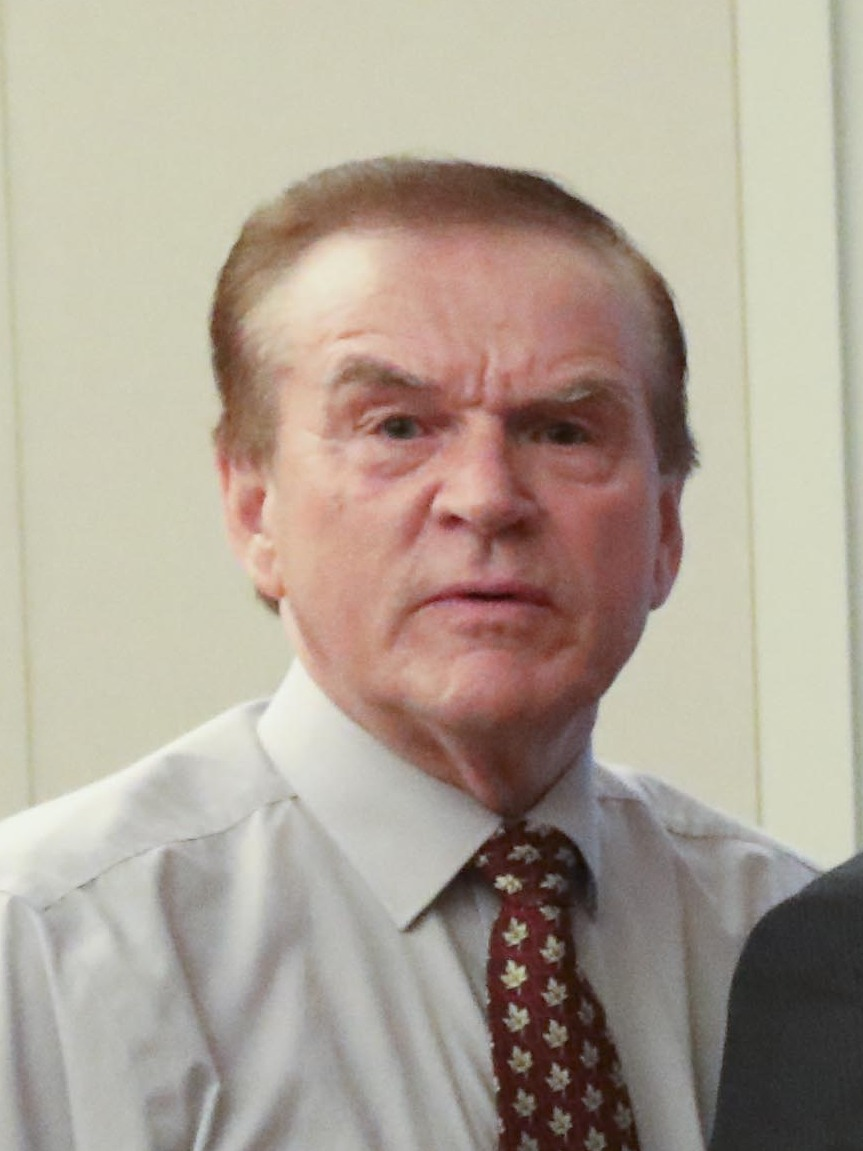
- Mockler in 2018.

Canadian Senator from New Brunswick
- In office 2 January 2009 – 14 April 2024
- Nominated by: Stephen Harper
- Appointed by: Michaëlle Jean

Member of the Legislative Assembly of New Brunswick
- In office 1993–2008
- Preceded by: Pierrette Ringuette
- Succeeded by: Burt Paulin
- Constituency: Madawaska South (1993–1995); Madawaska-la-Vallée (1995–2006); Restigouche-la-Vallée (2006–2008)
- In office 1982–1987
- Preceded by: Héliodore Côté
- Succeeded by: Pierrette Ringuette
- Constituency: Madawaska South

Personal details
- Born: 14 April 1949 (age 77) St. Leonard, New Brunswick, Canada
- Party: Conservative Party of Canada; Progressive Conservative Party of New Brunswick
- Spouse: Suzanne Soucy
- Education: Université de Moncton
- Occupation: politician, bureaucrat

Percy Paul Mockler (born 14 April 1949 in St. Leonard, New Brunswick) is a retired Canadian politician who served as a Canadian Senator for New Brunswick from 2009 until his retirement in 2024. A member of the Conservative Party of Canada, Mockler previously served two non-consecutive stints in the Legislative Assembly of New Brunswick from 1982 to 1987, and again from 1993 to 2008. He retired from the Senate on 14 April 2024, upon reaching the mandatory retirement age of 75.

== Biography ==
He studied at the University of Moncton where he earned a Bachelor of Arts in Political Science and Sociology and a Master of Business Administration degree. A member of the Progressive Conservative Party, was first elected to the Legislative Assembly of New Brunswick in the 1982 election.

After his election defeat in 1987, Mockler worked as an organizer for the federal Progressive Conservatives in the 1988 federal election and worked for the Brian Mulroney administration in Ottawa until its dying days in 1993.

Upon his return to New Brunswick, Mockler was able to run again to be a Member of the Legislative Assembly (MLA) as Pierrette Ringuette, the Liberal who had defeated him in 1987, had been elected to the House of Commons of Canada and a by-election was being held to replace her. Mockler was re-elected handily on 29 November 1993 and again in 1995, 1999, 2003 and 2006. In 2006, after the establishment of new electoral boundaries in New Brunswick, Mockler defeated soundly Liberal incumbent, Bert Paulin.

After the merger of the federal Progressive Conservative Party and the Canadian Alliance, Mockler was briefly mentioned as a possible leadership candidate for the new Conservative Party of Canada. Mockler instead backed Belinda Stronach and served as co-chair of her campaign in New Brunswick and helped organize it in Quebec.

Mockler is a key organizer for the Progressive Conservative Party of New Brunswick.

Prime Minister Stephen Harper appointed Mockler as a Senator on 2 January 2009.

On 14 April 2024, Mockler retired from the Senate on his 75th birthday due to mandatory retirement age regulations.

New Brunswick provincial government of Bernard Lord
Cabinet posts (6)
Predecessor	Office	Successor
Elvy Robichaud and himself	Minister of Wellness, Culture and Sport; 2006; Robichaud served as Minister of Health & Wellness; Mockler served as Minister responsible for Culture & Sport	Shawn Graham
Bernard Lord	Minister of Intergovernmental and International Relations; 2003–2006; Lord succeeded Mockler as Minister of Intergovernmental Affairs	Bernard Lord
Margaret-Ann Blaney	Minister of Transportation; 2002–2003	Paul Robichaud
Dennis Furlong	Minister of Family and Community Services; 2000–2001; Furlong served as Minister of Health & Community Services	Joan MacAlpine
Georgie Day and Marcelle Mersereau	Minister of Human Resources Development and Housing; 1999–2000; Day served as Minister of Human Resources Development; Mersereau served as Minister of Municipalities & Housing; McFarlane served as Minister of Training & Employment Development	Norm McFarlane
James E. Lockyer	Solicitor General; 1999–2000; Sherwood served as Minister of Public Safety	Milt Sherwood
Special Cabinet Responsibilities
Predecessor	Title	Successor
none	Minister responsible for the Immigration and Repatriation Secretariat; 2006 new designation	Greg Byrne
Paul Robichaud	Minister responsible for La Francophonie; 2003–2006	Hédard Albert
Norman Betts	Minister responsible for Service New Brunswick; 2003–2006	Dale Graham
Dennis Furlong	Minister responsible for the Culture and Sport Secretariat; 2003–2006; Mockler succeeded himself in this role as Minister of Wellness, Culture and Sport	himself
