= Claude Williams (politician) =

Canadian politician and civil servant

Minister of Transportation and Infrastructure
- In office October 12, 2010 – October 7, 2014
- Premier: David Alward
- Preceded by: Denis Landry
- Succeeded by: Roger Melanson

Minister of Education
- In office February 14, 2006 – October 3, 2006
- Premier: Bernard Lord
- Preceded by: Madeleine Dubé
- Succeeded by: Kelly Lamrock

Member of the New Brunswick Legislative Assembly for Kent South
- In office April 23, 2001 – September 22, 2014
- Preceded by: Camille Thériault
- Succeeded by: Benoît Bourque

Personal details
- Born: 25 November 1955 (age 70) Saint-Antoine, New Brunswick
- Party: Progressive Conservative
- Education: University of Moncton

Claude Williams (born November 25, 1955, in Saint-Antoine, New Brunswick) is a politician and former civil servant in the province of New Brunswick, Canada.

Williams studied at the University of Moncton, graduating with a Bachelor of Business Administration degree. Williams was executive assistant to Omer Léger and then a regional manager for the provincial Department of Fisheries and Aquaculture. He also served as a municipal councillor in Saint-Antoine.

He was first elected to the Legislative Assembly of New Brunswick in a 2001 by-election and was re-elected in the 2003 general election and the 2006 general election. He served in the cabinet for part of 2006. He was Minister of Transportation and Infrastructure from 2010 until his defeat in the 2014 general election.
