= Joan MacAlpine-Stiles =

Canadian politician

L. Joan MacAlpine-Stiles

MLA for Moncton South
- In office 1999–2006
- Preceded by: James E. Lockyer
- Succeeded by: district abolished

MLA for Moncton West
- In office 2006–2010
- Preceded by: new district
- Succeeded by: Susan Stultz

Personal details
- Born: Rexton, New Brunswick
- Party: Progressive Conservative (1999–2007); Liberal (2007–present)
- Spouse: Wally Stiles

L. Joan MacAlpine-Stiles (known earlier in her career as Joan MacAlpine) is a politician in the province of New Brunswick, Canada. She served as Member of the Legislative Assembly (MLA) for Moncton West from 1999 until 2010. She is married to fellow MLA Wally Stiles; they were married while in office in 2005.

She previously served in the province's cabinet from 1999 to 2006.

MacAlpine was elected to the Moncton City Council in 1992, 1995 and 1998 before resigning to accept her seat in the legislature.

On April 17, 2007, she announced that she would cross the floor to join the Liberal party, along with her husband and fellow MLA Wally Stiles. She did not stand for reelection in 2010.

== Election results ==
=== 2006 election ===
2006 New Brunswick election: Moncton South
Party	Candidate	Votes	%	±	Expenditures
Progressive Conservative	Joan MacAlpine-Stiles	3317	52.40	+4.69	$23,231
Liberal	Gene Joseph Devereaux	3013	47.60	+6.46	$15,604
Total valid votes/expense limit		6330	100.00	$30,367	
Total rejected ballots		61	0.54		
Turnout		6391	56.96	+1.00	
Electors on list		11,221			
Progressive Conservative hold		Swing	-0.89		

=== 2003 election ===
2003 New Brunswick election: Moncton South
Party	Candidate	Votes	%	±	Expenditures
Progressive Conservative	Joan MacAlpine	3143	47.71	-6.20	$21,525
Liberal	Norman Branch	2710	41.14	+4.56	$14,473
NDP	Stéphane Drysdale	437	6.63	-2.87	$0
Independent	John Gallant	226	3.43	*	not filed
Grey Party	Jean-Marc (Diggit) Dugas	72	1.09	*	not filed
Total valid votes/expense limit		6588	100.00	$30,801	
Total rejected ballots		41	0.35		
Turnout		6629	55.96	-11.57	
Electors on list		11,847			
Progressive Conservative hold		Swing	-5.38		

=== 1999 election ===
1999 New Brunswick election: Moncton South
Party	Candidate	Votes	%	±	Expenditures
Progressive Conservative	Joan MacAlpine	3898	53.91	+36.27	$19,681
Liberal	Jim Lockyer	2645	36.58	-25.25	$17,326
NDP	Teresa Sullivan	687	9.50	+1.26	$2,650
Total valid votes/expense limit		7230	100.00	$24,708	
Total rejected ballots		22	0.20		
Turnout		7252	67.53	+4.81	
Electors on list		10,739			
Progressive Conservative gain from Liberal		Swing	+30.76		

== Notes ==
New Brunswick provincial government of Bernard Lord
Cabinet posts (5)
Predecessor	Office	Successor
Paul Robichaud	Minister of Tourism and Parks; 2003–2006	Stuart Jamieson
Tony Huntjens	Minister of Family and Community Services (acting); 2005–2006	Madeleine Dubé
Percy Mockler	Minister of Family and Community Services; 2001–2003	Tony Huntjens
Peter Mesheau	Minister of Business New Brunswick; 2000–2001; Mesheau served as Minister of Economic Development, Tourism & Culture	Norman Betts
Marcelle Mersereau	Minister of Municipalities and Housing; 1999–2000; Mersereau served as Minister of Municipalities & Housing; Jardine served as Minister of Environment & Local Government	Kim Jardine
Special Cabinet Responsibilities
Predecessor	Title	Successor
Margaret-Ann Blaney	Minister responsible for the Status of Women; 2006	Carmel Robichaud
