= Department of Intergovernmental Affairs (New Brunswick) =

Agency overview
- Formed: 14 February 2006
- Jurisdiction: New Brunswick
- Agency executive: Brian Gallant, Minister of Governmental Affairs
- Parent department: Government of New Brunswick

The Department of Intergovernmental Affairs is a part of the Government of New Brunswick, Canada. It is charged with the relations between New Brunswick and other provinces, the federal government, and for international relations such as its involvement in the Council of New England Governors and Eastern Canadian Premiers and La Francophonie.

The department was established on June 21, 1999, when Premier Bernard Lord took office. On April 1, 2003, wanting to expand the province's involvement in foreign policy, the name was changed to the Department of Intergovernmental and International Relations. On February 14, 2006, it was returned to the name of Intergovernmental Affairs.

== Ministers ==
#	Minister	Term	Government
1.	Bernard Lord*	June 21, 1999 – June 27, 2003	as Premier
2.	Percy Mockler	June 27, 2003 - February 14, 2006	under Bernard Lord
	Bernard Lord (2nd time)	February 14, 2006 - October 3, 2006	as Premier
3.	Shawn Graham	October 3, 2006 - September 2010	as Premier
4.	David Alward	October 2010 – September 2014	as Premier
5.	Brian Gallant	September 2014 – Present	as Premier
