= Madawaska-la-Vallée =

Defunct provincial electoral district in New Brunswick, Canada

New Brunswick electoral district

Defunct provincial electoral district
- Legislature: Legislative Assembly of New Brunswick
- District created: 1994
- District abolished: 2006
- First contested: 1995
- Last contested: 2003

Madawaska-la-Vallée was a provincial electoral district which elected one member to the Legislative Assembly (MLA) of New Brunswick, Canada. It was created in the 1994 redrawing of electoral boundaries and dissolved in 2006. It was used in the 1995, 1999, and 2003 elections. Its only MLA was Progressive Conservative Party of New Brunswick representation Percy Mockler, now a member of the Senate of Canada.

In 1994, the district was created largely by merging the districts of Madawaska Centre and Madawaska South. In 2006, most of the district was merged with Restigouche West to form Restigouche-la-Vallée.

== Members of the Legislative Assembly ==
Assembly	Years	Member	Party
Riding created from Madawaska Centre and Madawaska South
53rd	1995–1999	Percy Mockler	Progressive Conservative
54th	1999–2003	Percy Mockler	Progressive Conservative
55th	2003–2006	Percy Mockler	Progressive Conservative
Riding dissolved into Restigouche-la-Vallée, Edmundston-Saint Basile, Madawaska-les-Lacs and Grand Falls-Drummond-Saint-André

== Election results ==
2003 New Brunswick general election
Party	Candidate	Votes	%	±%
Progressive Conservative	Percy Mockler	3,858	65.31	-3.42
Liberal	Claude J. Malenfant	1,848	31.28	+2.98
New Democratic	Mario Fortunato	201	3.40	+0.43
Total valid votes		5,907	100.0	
Progressive Conservative hold		Swing		-3.20

1999 New Brunswick general election
Party	Candidate	Votes	%	±%
Progressive Conservative	Percy Mockler	4,367	68.73	+12.01
Liberal	Huguette Plourde	1,798	28.30	-13.30
New Democratic	Jean-Charles Lombard	189	2.97	+1.28
Total valid votes		6,354	100.0	
Progressive Conservative hold		Swing		+12.66

1995 New Brunswick general election
Party	Candidate	Votes	%	±%
Progressive Conservative	Percy Mockler	3,964	56.71	
Liberal	Gérald Clavette	2,908	41.60	
New Democratic	Jean-Marie St. Onge	118	1.69	
Total valid votes		6,990	100.0	
Progressive Conservative notional gain		Swing		

* This was a new riding created largely out of a merger of the former ridings of Madawaska Centre and Madawaska South, the former of which was held by Clavette, a Liberal and the latter of which was held by Mockler, a Progressive Conservative.

== See also ==
- List of New Brunswick provincial electoral districts
- Canadian provincial electoral districts
