= Brad Green (politician) =

Canadian politician

Bradley V. Green, KC (born January 29, 1965, in Fredericton, New Brunswick) is a Canadian lawyer, judge and a former politician in the Province of New Brunswick.

The son of Vernon G. Green & Laurine Nicholson Green, Bradley Green studied at the University of New Brunswick, earning an honours degree in Political science and a law degree. He was admitted to Bar of New Brunswick in 1991.

He was first elected to the Legislative Assembly of New Brunswick in a 1998 by-election and was re-elected in 1999 and 2003. He represented the electoral district of Fredericton South and was a member of the cabinet from 1999 to 2006.

His career in the New Brunswick Legislative Assembly ended when he lost his seat in 2006 to Liberal MLA, Rick Miles.

In May 2008, he was appointed a Judge of the Court of Queen's Bench for the judicial district of Saint John. Green was named to the Court of Appeal of New Brunswick in Fredericton on September 1, 2009.

Green married Margaret Gregg in 1996 and they have since divorced. He has since remarried.

New Brunswick provincial government of Bernard Lord
Cabinet posts (3)
Predecessor	Office	Successor
Greg Byrne	Attorney General of New Brunswick; 1999–2006	Thomas J. Burke
Elvy Robichaud	Minister of Health; 2006; Robichaud was Minister of Health & Wellness	Mike Murphy
Greg Byrne	Minister of Justice; 1999–2006; Fitch was Minister of Justice & Consumer Affairs	Bruce Fitch
Special Cabinet Responsibilities
Predecessor	Title	Successor
Greg Byrne	Government House Leader; 1999–2006	Bev Harrison
Bernard Thériault	Minister responsible for Aboriginal Affairs; 1999–2006; Thériault was Minister of Intergovernmental & Aboriginal Affairs	Rose-May Poirier
