= 2003 New Brunswick general election =

Canadian provincial election

- June 9, 2003

55 seats of the Legislative Assembly of New Brunswick 28 seats needed for a majority
- Turnout: 68.67%
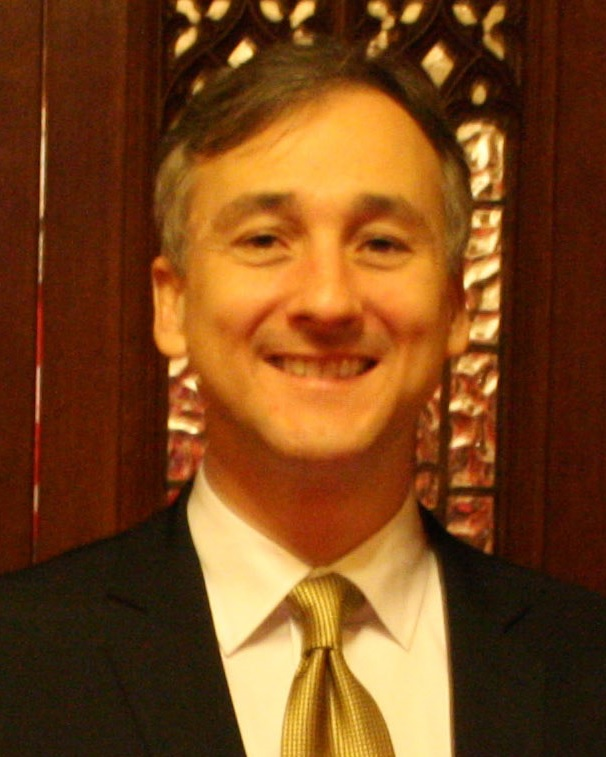

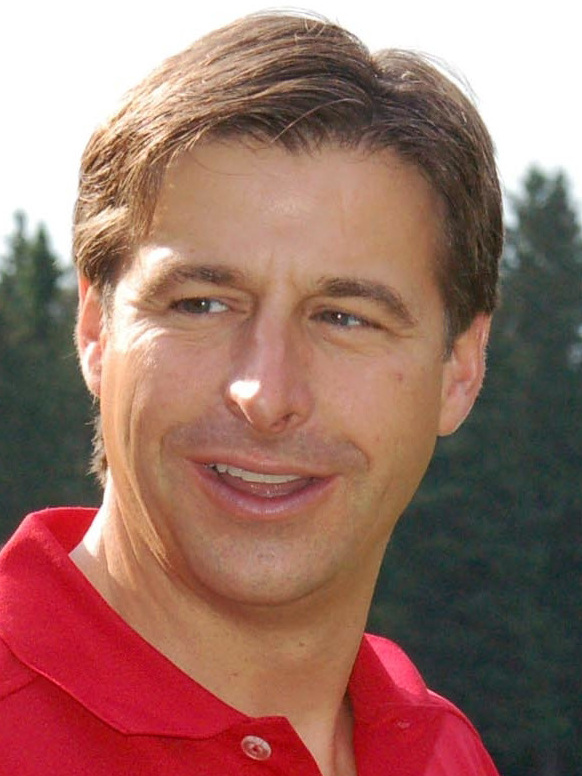
	First party	Second party	Third party
			NDP
Leader	Bernard Lord	Shawn Graham	Elizabeth Weir
Party	Progressive Conservative	Liberal	New Democratic
Leader since	1997	2002	1988
Leader's seat	Moncton East	Kent	Saint John Harbour
Last election	44	10	1
Seats won	28	26	1
Seat change	▼16	▲16	Steady
Popular vote	174,092	170,028	36,989
Percentage	45.4%	44.4%	9.7%
Swing	▼7.6%	▲7.1%	▲0.9%
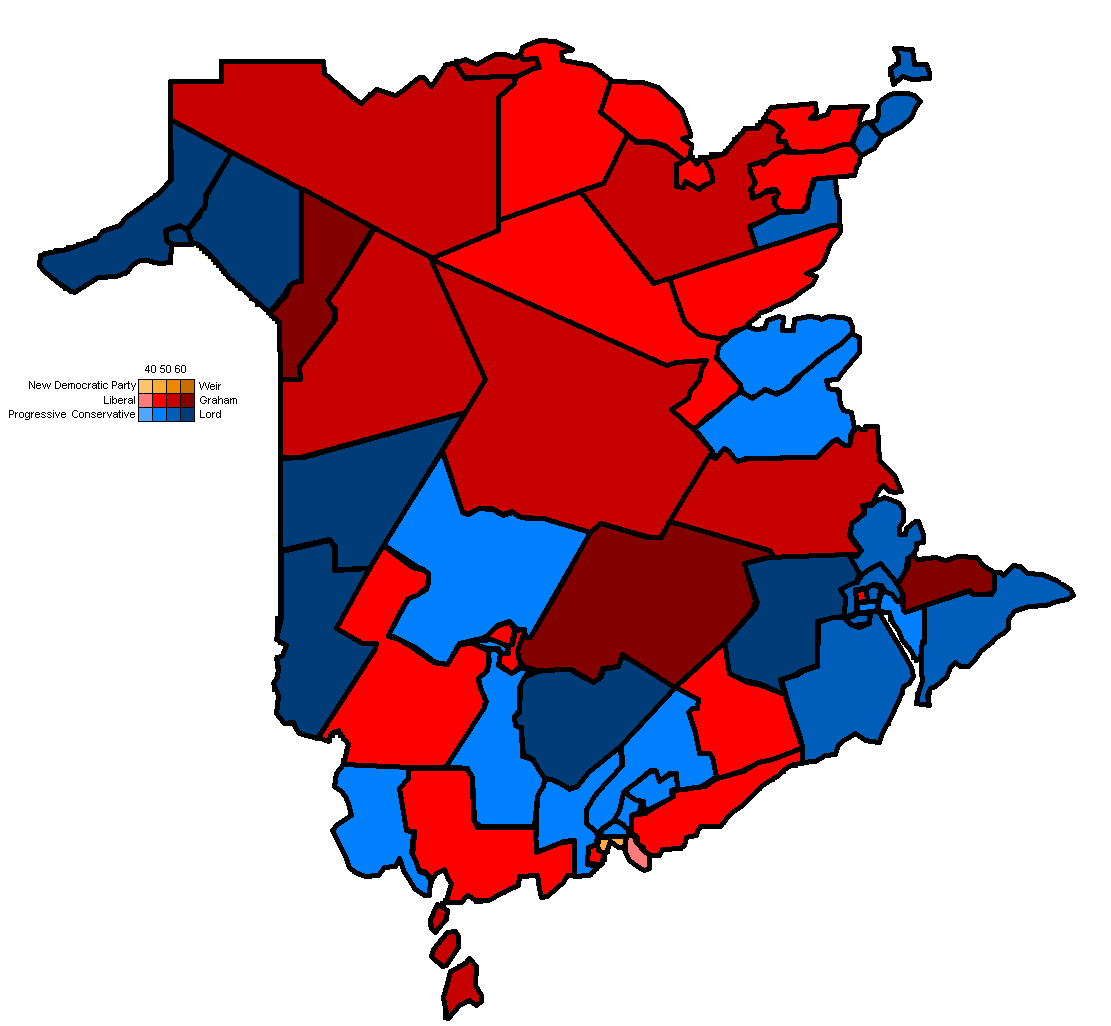
- Map of New Brunswick's ridings coloured in based on the winning parties and their popular vote
Premier before election
Bernard Lord
Progressive Conservative
Premier after election
Bernard Lord
Progressive Conservative

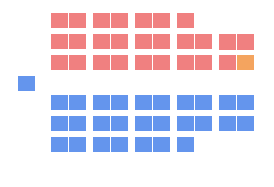
Rendition of party representation in the 55th New Brunswick Legislative Assembly decided by this election. Progressive Conservatives (28) Liberals (26) New Democrats (1)

The 2003 New Brunswick general election was held on June 9, 2003, to elect the 55 members of the 55th New Brunswick Legislative Assembly.

Although early polls suggested a landslide victory for the incumbent Progressive Conservatives of Premier Bernard Lord, the dynamics of the race shifted after Shawn Graham, leader of the Liberal Party, made auto insurance rates a key issue of his campaign.

Lord and the Progressive Conservatives were ultimately re-elected, but with their majority government reduced to just one seat, finishing only two seats ahead of Graham's Liberals. The New Democrats held their sole seat in the legislature.

== Campaign ==
Leading up to the election, New Brunswick had its car insurance rates skyrocket. The Liberal Party of New Brunswick consequently focused its campaign on three points:

1. improved universal health care,
2. keeping the province's electric utility, NB Power, as a public crown corporation, and
3. the lowering of automobile insurance rates.

On the other hand, the campaign of Premier Bernard Lord and his Progressive Conservative Party faced a number of problems, especially after changing its position on the key issue of auto insurance several times during the 30-day campaign.

The results were very close, and for most of election night as the results came in, the winner was unclear. Shawn Graham was even heard to remark on television as the night was drawing to a close that "Up to 5 minutes ago, I thought I was Premier".

New Democratic Party of New Brunswick leader Elizabeth Weir was the only member of her party to win a seat. The party ran 55 candidates throughout the province.

The newly founded but short-lived New Brunswick Grey Party, a branch of the Grey Party of Canada, also ran 10 candidates, including party leader Jim Webb.

== Results ==
=== Results by party ===
Summary of the 2003 Legislative Assembly of New Brunswick election results
Party	Party leader	# of candidates	Seats				Popular vote		
Party	Party leader	# of candidates	1999	Dissolution	Elected	% Change	#	%	Change
Progressive Conservative	Bernard Lord	55	44	46	28	-39.1%	174,092	45.45%	-7.6%
Liberal	Shawn Graham	55	10	7	26	+271%	170,028	44.39%	+7.1%
New Democratic	Elizabeth Weir	55	1	1	1	-	36,989	9.66%	+0.9%
Grey	Jim Webb	10	n/a^{1}	-	-		1,550	0.40%	n/a^{1}
Independent		2	-	-	-		415	0.11%	-0.1%
Vacant				1					
Total		177	55	55	55	-	383,074	100%	
Source: http://www.gnb.ca/elections

^{1} The Grey Party did not contest the 1999 election.

Popular vote
PC	45.45%
Liberal	44.39%
New Democratic	9.66%
Others	0.50%

Seats summary
PC	50.91%
Liberal	47.27%
New Democratic	1.82%

=== Results by region ===
Party Name		North NB	East NB	S. East NB	Greater Saint John/ Fundy Coast	Greater Fred.	Upper Saint John River Valley	Total
Progressive; Conservative	Seats:	2	3	8	6	4	5	28
Progressive; Conservative	Popular Vote:	45.9%	42.4%	49.5%	39.8%	42.1%	55.1%	45.4%
Liberal	Seats:	8	5	2	5	4	2	26
Liberal	Popular Vote:	47.7%	50.2%	42.0%	41.0%	44.3%	40.6%	44.4%
New; Democratic	Seats:	-	-	-	1	-	-	1
New; Democratic	Popular Vote:	6.4%	7.4%	7.9%	17.2%	13.4%	4.3%	9.7%
Total seats:		10	8	10	12	8	7	55
Parties that won no seats:
Grey	Popular Vote:	-	-	0.3%	1.8%	0.2%	-	0.4%
Independents	Popular Vote:	-	-	0.3%	0.3%	-	-	0.1%

== Candidates ==
Party leaders and cabinet ministers are denoted in bold.

=== Northern New Brunswick ===
Electoral district	Candidates				Incumbent
Electoral district	PC	Liberal	NDP	Other	Incumbent
1. Restigouche West	Benoît Cyr 2,523	Burt Paulin 4,008	Antoine Duguay 257		Benoît Cyr
2. Campbellton	Jean F. Dubé 2,771	Roy Boudreau 3,979	Murray Mason 294		Jean F. Dubé
3. Dalhousie-Restigouche East	Paul McIntyre 3,088	Donald Arseneault 3,445	Joel Hickey 645		**Dennis Furlong**
4. Nigadoo-Chaleur	Hermel Vienneau 3,529	Roland Haché 3,887	Kate Hayward 380		Roland Haché
5. Bathurst	Nancy MacKay 3,252	Brian Kenny 3,348	Mark Robar 304		Marcelle Mersereau
6. Nepisiguit	Joel Bernard 2,200	Frank Branch 3,498	Normand Savoie 894		Joel Bernard
7. Caraquet	Gaston Moore 3,550	Hédard Albert 3,649	Gérard Béland 457		Gaston Moore
8. Lamèque-Shippagan-Miscou	**Paul Robichaud** 4,788	Denis Roussel 2,846	Jean-Baptiste Bezeau 335		**Paul Robichaud**
9. Centre-Péninsule	Louis-Philippe McGraw 3,045	Denis Landry 3,097	Rose Duguay 396		Louis-Phillipe McGraw
10. Tracadie-Sheila	**Elvy Robichaud** 4,583	Weldon McLaughlin 2,894	Stéphane Richardson 661		**Elvy Robichaud**

=== Eastern New Brunswick ===
Electoral district	Candidates				Incumbent
Electoral district	PC	Liberal	NDP	Other	Incumbent
11. Miramichi Bay	Réjean Savoie 3,050	Carmel Robichaud 3,227	Hilaire Rouselle 729		Réjean Savoie
12. Miramichi-Bay du Vin	Michael Malley 3,917	Frank Trevors 3,464	Dwayne Hancock 490		Michael Malley
13. Miramichi Centre	**Kim Jardine** 3,149	John Foran 3,763	Lance Lyons 663		**Kim Jardine**
14. Southwest Miramichi	**Norman Betts** 2,823	Rick Brewer 3,395	Chris Ashford 332		**Norman Betts**
15. Rogersville-Kouchibouguac	Rose-May Poirier 3,289	Maurice Richard 2,968	Oscar Doucet 404		Rose-May Poirier
16. Kent	Valmond Joseph Daigle 1,905	**Shawn Graham** 3,615	Jerry Cook 958		**Shawn Graham**
17. Kent South	Claude Williams 4,933	Stephen Doucet 4,065	Neil Gardner 671		Claude Williams
18. Shediac-Cap-Pélé	Odette Babineau 3,063	Bernard Richard 6,464	Claudette Beland 313		Bernard Richard

=== Southeastern New Brunswick ===
Electoral district	Candidates				Incumbent
Electoral district	PC	Liberal	NDP	Other	Incumbent
19. Tantramar	**Peter Mesheau** 2,922	Susan Purdy 1,569	Geoff Martin 522		**Peter Mesheau**
20. Dieppe-Memramcook	Cy LeBlanc 5,541	Elie Richard 5,451	Hélène Lapointe 786		Cy LeBlanc
21. Moncton East	**Bernard Lord** 4,177	Chris Collins 3,113	Jean-Marie Nadeau 724		**Bernard Lord**
22. Moncton South	**Joan MacAlpine** 3,143	Norman Branch 2,710	Stéphane Drysdale 437	Jean-Marc Dugas (Ind.) 226; John Gallant (Grey) 72	**Joan MacAlpine**
23. Moncton North	René Landry 3,054	Mike Murphy 3,555	Nancy McBain 543		René Landry
24. Moncton Crescent	John Betts 4,230	Ray Goudreau 3,776	Richard Goulding 628		John Betts
25. Petitcodiac	Wally Stiles 3,481	Bethany Dykstra 1,849	Tracy Trott 298	Dan Leaman (Grey) 120	Wally Stiles
26. Riverview	Bruce Fitch 3,794	Ward White 3,287	John Falconer 391		vacant
27. Albert	Wayne Steeves 3,198	Clark Butland 2,311	Pat Pearson 457		Wayne Steeves
28. Kings East	Doug Cosman 2,713	Leroy Armstrong 3,169	George Horton 996		Doug Cosman

=== Greater Saint John & Fundy Coast ===
Electoral district	Candidates				Incumbent
Electoral district	PC	Liberal	NDP	Other	Incumbent
29. Hampton-Belleisle	Bev Harrison 3,392	Bob Bates 2,736	Pat Hanratty 1,336	John Hughes (Grey) 208	Bev Harrison
30. Kennebecasis	Brenda Fowlie 3,265	Murray Driscoll 3,247	Kenneth Wilcox 970		Brenda Fowlie
31. Saint John-Fundy	**Rodney Weston** 2,271	Stuart Jamieson 2,698	Liam Freill 517	Marjorie MacMurray (Grey) 172	**Rodney Weston**
32. Saint John-Kings	**Margaret-Ann Blaney** 3,135	Tom Young 2,456	Jeff Thibodeau 791	Mark LeBlanc (Grey) 145	**Margaret-Ann Blaney**
33. Saint John Champlain	Mel Vincent 1,501	Roly MacIntyre 2,160	Ralph Thomas 1,507	Bill Richard Reid (Grey) 223	Carole Keddy
34. Saint John Harbour	Dennis Boyle 1,286	Anne-Marie Mullin 1,231	**Elizabeth Weir** 1,929		**Elizabeth Weir**
35. Saint John Portland	Trevor Holder 2,436	Colleen Knudson 2,307	Mary Arseneau 1,191		Trevor Holder
36. Saint John Lancaster	**Norm McFarlane** 2,633	Abel LeBlanc 2,942	Walter Lee 1,365	**Jim Webb** (Grey) 170	**Norm McFarlane**
37. Grand Bay-Westfield	Milt Sherwood 2,209	Kevin Quinn 1,991	Percy Ward 556	Ben Perry (Grey) 193; Colby Fraser (Ind.) 189	Milt Sherwood
38. Charlotte	Sharon Tucker 1,573	Rick Doucet 2,777	Patty Hooper 1,149	Harold Smith (Grey) 118	Sheldon Lee
39. Fundy Isles	Burton Flynn 1,124	Eric Allaby 1,359	Dick Grant 94		Eric Allaby
40. Western Charlotte	Tony Huntjens 2,854	Madeleine Drummie 2,662	Andrew Graham 554		Tony Huntjens

=== Greater Fredericton ===
Electoral district	Candidates				Incumbent
Electoral district	PC	Liberal	NDP	Other	Incumbent
41. Oromocto-Gagetown	Jody Carr 4,314	Maurice Harquail 2,140	Terry Hovey 392	James Lee (Grey) 129	Jody Carr
42. Grand Lake	David Jordan 2,058	Eugene McGinley 4,376	David Babineau 614		David Jordan
43. Fredericton North	D. Peter Forbes 3,211	T.J. Burke 4,163	Dennis Atchison 1,418		D. Peter Forbes
44. Fredericton-Fort Nashwaak	Eric MacKenzie 2,364	Kelly Lamrock 2,925	Penny Ericson 1,531		Eric MacKenzie
45. Fredericton South	**Brad Green** 3,309	Misty McLaughlin 2,797	Nan Luke 1,832		**Brad Green**
46. New Maryland	Keith Ashfield 3,719	Joan Kingston 3,502	Kay Nandlall 923		Keith Ashfield
47. York	Don Kinney 3,278	Scott Targett 3,783	Gary Hughes 618		Don Kinney
48. Mactaquac	Kirk MacDonald 3,337	Ray Dillon 3,236	Phillip Morgan 817		Kirk MacDonald

=== Upper Saint John River Valley ===
Electoral district	Candidates				Incumbent
Electoral district	PC	Liberal	NDP	Other	Incumbent
49. Woodstock	David Alward 4,605	Lorne Drake 2,400	Nancy Reid 286		David Alward
50. Carleton	**Dale Graham** 4,190	Grant Robinson 2,287	Betty Brown 482		**Dale Graham**
51. Victoria-Tobique	Dennis Campbell 2,001	Larry Kennedy 3,386	Harvey Bass 502		Larry Kennedy
52. Grand Falls Region	Jean-Guy Laforest 2,586	Ron Ouellette 4,385	Pierre Cyr 192		Jean-Guy Laforest
53. Madawaska-la-Vallée	**Percy Mockler** 3,858	Claude Malenfant 1,848	Mario Fortunato 201		**Percy Mockler**
54. Edmundston	Madeleine Dubé 3,917	Margot Albert 1,841	Blair McInnis 110		Madeleine Dubé
55. Madawaska-les-Lacs	**Jeannot Volpé** 3,965	Louis LaBrie 2,391	Jason Carney 187		**Jeannot Volpé**
