= Hédard Albert =

Canadian politician

Hédard Albert MLA

Member of the New Brunswick Legislative Assembly for Caraquet
- In office June 9, 2003 – 2018
- Preceded by: Gaston Moore
- Succeeded by: Isabelle Thériault

Personal details
- Born: 1944 or 1945 (age 81–82)
- Party: Liberal

Hédard Albert (born in Saint-Simon, New Brunswick), is a New Brunswick politician.

Albert worked for 35 years at the CCNB (francophone branch of the New Brunswick Community College system) fisheries school where he taught, conducted research and served as school administrator. He was also involved in Canadian International Development Agency programs to develop fisheries abroad.

He was elected as a Liberal to the Legislative Assembly of New Brunswick in the 2003 general election to represent the riding of Caraquet and was re-elected in 2006.

Following the 2003 election, he served in the opposition shadow cabinet as critic for Intergovernmental and International Relations, Official Languages and Culture & Sport.

Following the 2006 election, he became a cabinet minister.

New Brunswick provincial government of Shawn Graham
Cabinet posts (2)
Predecessor	Office	Successor
Shawn Graham	Minister of Wellness, Culture and Sport; 2007–2010	Trevor Holder
Dale Graham	Minister of Human Resources; 2006–2007	Wally Stiles
Special Cabinet Responsibilities
Predecessor	Title	Successor
Percy Mockler	Minister responsible for La Francophonie; 2006–2010	Paul Robichaud
