= Roly MacIntyre =

Canadian civil servant and politician

Member of the New Brunswick Legislative Assembly for Saint John East Saint John Champlain (1995-1999, 2003-2006)
- In office June 9, 2003 – September 27, 2010
- Preceded by: Carole Keddy
- Succeeded by: Glen Tait
- In office September 11, 1995 – June 7, 1999
- Preceded by: George Jenkins
- Succeeded by: Carole Keddy

Personal details
- Born: December 31, 1943 (age 82) Charlottetown, Prince Edward Island
- Party: Liberal
- Occupation: Banker

Roly MacIntyre (born December 31, 1943) is a former civil servant and politician in the province of New Brunswick, Canada. He was elected to the Legislative Assembly of New Brunswick in 1995 and re-elected in 2003 and 2006 after having been defeated in 1999.

MacIntyre was born in Charlottetown, Prince Edward Island. He was district manager for Niagara Finance and Niagara Mortgage & Loan from 1964 to 1971. MacIntyre married Phyllis Coady. In 1971, he joined the federal Unemployment Insurance Commission, moving to Saint John, New Brunswick in 1976 after he became regional manager. In 1978, he became district manager for Human Resources Development Canada. He retired in 1995.

He represented the electoral district of Saint John East (formerly Saint John Champlain from 1995 to 2006) and was a member of the cabinet from 1995 to 1999 and again from 2006 to 2008.

New Brunswick provincial government of Shawn Graham
Cabinet post (1)
Predecessor	Office	Successor
Bev Harrison	Minister of Supply and Services; 2006–2008; Keir succeeded MacIntyre on an acting basis	Jack Keir
Special Cabinet Responsibilities
Predecessor	Title	Successor
Jeannot Volpé	Minister responsible for the Regional Development Corporation; 2006–2008; Boudreau succeeded MacIntyre on an acting basis	Victor Boudreau
New Brunswick provincial government of Camille Thériault
Cabinet post (1)
Predecessor	Office	Successor
James Lockyer	Minister of Economic Development, Tourism and Culture; 1998–1999	Peter Mesheau
New Brunswick provincial government of Ray Frenette
Cabinet post (1)
Predecessor	Office	Successor
himself in McKenna government	Minister of Advanced Education and Labour; 1997–1998; Kingston served as Minister of Labour; Richard served as Minister of Education	Joan Kingston and Bernard Richard
New Brunswick provincial government of Frank McKenna
Cabinet post (1)
Predecessor	Office	Successor
Camille Thériault	Minister of Advanced Education and Labour; 1995–1997	himself in Frenette government
