= Cy LeBlanc =

Canadian politician

Member of the New Brunswick Legislative Assembly for Dieppe Centre-Lewisville (Dieppe-Memramcook; 1999–2006)
- In office June 7, 1999 – September 27, 2010
- Preceded by: Greg O'Donnell
- Succeeded by: Roger Melanson

Personal details
- Born: Richard LeBlanc; March 18, 1955 (age 71) Dieppe, New Brunswick, Canada
- Party: Progressive Conservative
- Spouse: Jocelyne Arsenault

Richard "Cy" LeBlanc (born March 18, 1955, in Dieppe, New Brunswick) is a politician in the province of New Brunswick, Canada.

LeBlanc graduated from the University of Moncton with a Bachelor's degree in Leisure Studies, and worked in sales. In 1994 he worked to promote the World Acadian Congress.

A member of the Progressive Conservative Party of New Brunswick, he was elected to the Legislative Assembly of New Brunswick in 1999 and re-elected in 2003 and 2006.

For the 55th session of the legislature (2003–2006), he served as Deputy Speaker.

Leblanc is married to Jocelyne Arsenault.
