= Madeleine Dubé =

Canadian social worker and politician

Member of the New Brunswick Legislative Assembly for Edmundston-Madawaska Centre Edmundston-Saint Basile (2006-2014) Edmundston (1999-2006)
- In office June 7, 1999 – July 6, 2018
- Preceded by: Bernard Valcourt
- Succeeded by: Jean-Claude D'Amours

New Brunswick Minister of Education
- In office 2003–2006
- Preceded by: Dennis Furlong
- Succeeded by: Claude Williams

New Brunswick Minister of Family and Community Services
- In office 2006–2006
- Preceded by: Joan MacAlpine-Stiles
- Succeeded by: Carmel Robichaud

New Brunswick Minister of Health
- In office 2010–2012
- Preceded by: Mary Schryer
- Succeeded by: Ted Flemming

New Brunswick Minister of Social Development
- In office 2012–2014
- Preceded by: Sue Stultz
- Succeeded by: Cathy Rogers

Dean of the Legislative Assembly of New Brunswick
- In office August 21, 2014 – July 6, 2018 Serving with David Alward (2014 – 2015); Jody Carr; Trevor Holder; Kirk MacDonald
- Preceded by: Dale Graham

Personal details
- Party: Progressive Conservative

Madeleine "Mado" Dubé ONB (born September 26, 1961) is a Canadian social worker and politician from New Brunswick.

== Early life and education ==
Dubé was born on September 26, 1961, in Edmundston, the daughter of Adrien and Huguette Dubé.

She attended l'Université de Moncton (UdeM), where she received a Bachelor of Social Work. She has completed course work toward a Masters of Social Work with a specialization in group intervention at Université Laval.

A social worker, she has worked for the Department of Health and Community Services (Edmundston and Grand Falls) and the Region 4 Hospital Corporation Drug Addiction Service. She was co-owner and president of a human development agency named Priorité Santé Inc.

She also taught introductory courses leading to a certificate in drug addiction studies at the Université de Moncton – Edmundston campus, and is certified in the fields of family mediation, grievance mediation, defusing/debriefing, suicide prevention, and toxicology.

== Political career ==
Dubé was first elected to the Legislative Assembly of New Brunswick in the 1999 provincial election and was re-elected in 2003, 2006 and 2010. In her first term, she chaired the committee on health care and joined the cabinet immediately following her re-election first as Minister of Education and then, on February 14, 2006, as Minister of Family and Community Services. After her election to a third term she served in the opposition. She has been elected as Progressive Conservative Caucus chairperson in the Fall of 2007. In September 2010, she was re-elected four times in a row to the New Brunswick Legislature with one of the largest majorities.

She was re-elected in the 2014 provincial election that saw the defeat of the Progressive Conservative government and her return to the Opposition benches where she serves as Opposition House Leader.

Dubé was named to the Select Committee on Cannabis, pursuant to Motion 31 of the 3rd session of the 58th New Brunswick Legislature.

== University administration ==
She decided to retire from politics and not run again in the 2018 provincial election. In June 2018, she was named vice-president of the Edmundston campus of the Université de Moncton. In April 2025 she was named chancellor of the Université de Moncton for a five-year term.

== Personal life ==
Dubé lives in Edmundston with her husband, Mike. She has two children, Shawn and Paryse.

Dubé was made a Member of the Order of New Brunswick in 2021.
