= Bev Harrison =

Canadian politician (born 1942)

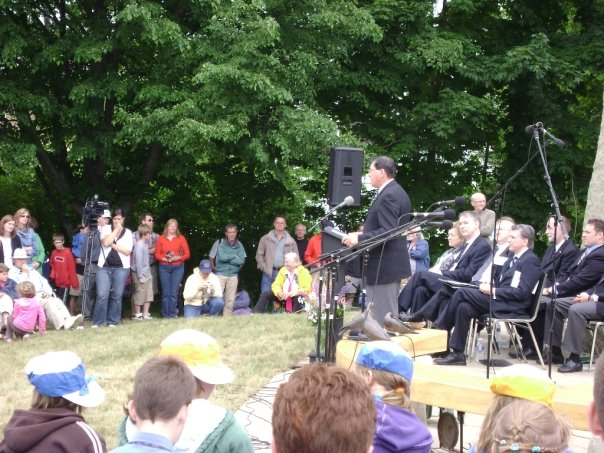
- Bev Harrison speaking at the unveiling of the Credo monument on June 15, 2008

Speaker of the Legislative Assembly of New Brunswick
- In office 1999–2006
- Preceded by: John McKay
- Succeeded by: Michael Malley

MLA for Saint John-Fundy
- In office 1978–1987
- Preceded by: Bill Woodroffe
- Succeeded by: Stuart Jamieson

MLA for Hampton-Kings Hampton-Belleisle (1999–2006)
- In office 1999–2014
- Preceded by: Georgie Day
- Succeeded by: Gary Crossman

Personal details
- Born: May 10, 1942 (age 83) Saint John, New Brunswick
- Party: New Democratic Party
- Other political affiliations: Progressive Conservative (1978–2014)
- Spouse: Marje Nunn
- Occupation: School teacher

Beverly John "Bev" Harrison (born May 10, 1942) is a former teacher and New Brunswick politician.

== Early life ==
The son of William and Jean Harrison, Harrison received bachelor degrees in Arts and Education from the University of New Brunswick.

== Political career ==
Harrison was first elected to the legislature in 1978 to represent Saint John-Fundy and was re-elected in 1982. In 1985, he, and two other Saint John-area MLAs, undertook a caucus revolt calling for the resignation of Premier Richard Hatfield. Hatfield made some concessions to them and they were re-integrated to caucus.

Harrison was defeated in the 1987 election which saw the Opposition Liberals sweep every seat in the province. Harrison was again defeated in Saint John-Fundy in the 1991 election. He did not contest the 1995 election.

== Return to teaching ==
From 1987 to 1997, in private life, Harrison returned to teaching, becoming principal of Saint John High School (1992). He retired from teaching in 1997.

== Re-election ==
In the 1999 election, he was re-elected to the legislature for the riding of Hampton-Kings. He was acclaimed as Speaker on July 6, 1999. Re-elected to the legislature in the 2003 election, he was also re-elected, again by acclamation, as Speaker on July 29, 2003. He resigned from his post as speaker on February 14, 2006 when he was named to the cabinet as Government House Leader in the Legislative Assembly of New Brunswick and Minister of Supply and Services.

He was re-elected in the 2006 general election, however his party lost and as a result Harrison sat on the opposition benches for the first time in his 15 years in the legislature.

In 2010, Harrison was re-elected with 57% of the vote with his nearest opponent garnering 22%. Harrison announced that he would be seeking the New Democratic Party nomination in the district of Hampton for the 2014 election. Harrison lost the election to Progressive Conservative candidate [Gary Crossman].

New Brunswick provincial government of Bernard Lord
Cabinet post (1)
Predecessor	Office	Successor
Dale Graham	Minister of Supply and Services; 2006	Roly MacIntyre
Special Cabinet Responsibilities
Predecessor	Title	Successor
Brad Green	Government House Leader; 2006	Stuart Jamieson
