= Jeannot Volpé =

Canadian politician

Member of the Legislative Assembly of New Brunswick for Madawaska-les-Lacs
- In office 1995–2010

New Brunswick Cabinet Minister
- In office 1999–2006

Interim Leader of the Progressive Conservative Party of New Brunswick
- In office January 21, 2007 – 2008
- Preceded by: Bernard Lord
- Succeeded by: David Alward

Leader of the Opposition of New Brunswick
- In office January 21, 2007 – 2008
- Preceded by: Bernard Lord
- Succeeded by: David Alward

Jeannot Volpé (born June 28, 1950) is a Canadian politician in the Province of New Brunswick.

Born in Saint-Jacques, New Brunswick, Volpé graduated from the University of Moncton in 1973 with a Bachelor of Physical Education degree and taught school until 1980. He was elected to the Legislative Assembly of New Brunswick in 1995 and re-elected in 1999, 2003 and 2006.

He represented the electoral district of Madawaska-les-Lacs and was a member of the cabinet from 1999 to 2006. On December 19, 2006, he was elected interim leader of the Progressive Conservative Party of New Brunswick, he became leader of the opposition in the Legislature upon Bernard Lord's resignation from that role on January 31, 2007.

Volpé married former Progressive Conservative MLA and Cabinet Minister Kim Jardine, whom he met when he served in cabinet with her from 1999 to 2003, on May 19, 2007.

In May 2009, Volpé announced that he was not reoffering in the 2010 election.

In 2012, Volpe took the Government to the Human Rights Commission over a 1/3 cut in government pensions.

== Notes ==
New Brunswick provincial government of Bernard Lord
Cabinet posts (2)
Predecessor	Office	Successor
Peter Mesheau	Minister of Finance; 2003–2006	Victor Boudreau
Doug Tyler	Minister of Natural Resources and Energy; 1999–2003; Ashfield served as Minister of Natural Resources; Fitch served as Minister of Energy	Keith Ashfield and Bruce Fitch
Special Cabinet Responsibilities
Predecessor	Title	Successor
Bernard Lord	Minister responsible for the Regional Development Corporation; 2006	Roly MacIntyre
Other offices
Preceded by Bernard Lord	Leader of the Opposition in the Legislative Assembly of New Brunswick; 2007–2008	Succeeded by David Alward
Preceded by Bernard Lord	Leader of the Progressive Conservative Party of New Brunswick; 2006–2008 (interim)	Succeeded by David Alward
Preceded by Georges Corriveau	MLA for Madawaska-les-Lacs; 1995–2010	Succeeded by Yvon Bonenfant
