= Elvy Robichaud =

Canadian politician

Elvy Robichaud (born April 3, 1951 in Tracadie-Sheila, New Brunswick) is a former Canadian politician. He last served in 2006 as the member of the Legislative Assembly of New Brunswick for Tracadie-Sheila.

== Education ==
Robichaud was educated at the University of Moncton where he received Bachelor of Physical Education, Bachelor of Education and Master of Education degrees. He was a school principal and later a hospital administrator through the 1980s and early 1990s.

== Politics ==
While at the University of Moncton he was involved in student government and was elected to Tracadie municipal council in 1983 serving one three-year term. He was elected to the Legislative Assembly of New Brunswick in a by-election in 1994. A Progressive Conservative, he was the first of his party to win a seat in the area since 1912. His party was struggling at the time and was a third party in the legislature.

He was re-elected in 1995 when his party regained the status of official opposition under the leadership former federal cabinet minister Bernard Valcourt. When Valcourt resigned as leader in 1997, Robichaud served as interim leader until the election of Bernard Lord and as leader of the opposition from Valcourt's resignation until Lord won a seat in a by-election in 1998.

Robichaud was again elected in 1999 and his party was victorious across the province. He was sworn into the cabinet as Minister of Education and served as education minister until 2001 when he was shuffled into the health portfolio.

Robichaud was again re-elected in 2003 and continued in the cabinet. On January 31, 2006 he announced he would not run again and would step down from the cabinet the next time it was shuffled. He left the cabinet following the shuffle on February 14, 2006.

For the 2006 New Brunswick election he served as Conservative campaign chairman.

New Brunswick provincial government of Bernard Lord
Cabinet posts (2)
Predecessor	Office	Successor
Dennis Furlong	Minister of Health and Wellness; 2001–2006; Green served as Minister of Health; Mockler served as Minister of Wellness, Culture & Sport	Brad Green and Percy Mockler
Bernard Richard	Minister of Education; 1999–2001	Dennis Furlong
Special Cabinet Responsibilities
Predecessor	Title	Successor
none	Minister responsible for the Office of Human Resources; 2001–2002 new designation	Rodney Weston
Peter Mesheau	Minister responsible for the Culture and Sport Secretariat; 2000–2001; Mesheau was Minister of Economic Development, Tourism & Culture	Dennis Furlong

Preceded by Bernard Valcourt	Leader of the Opposition in the Legislative Assembly of New Brunswick; 1997–1998	Succeeded by Bernard Lord
