= Regional Development Corporation =

Crown corporation of New Brunswick

- Société de développement régional

Provincial Crown corporation overview
- Formed: 1965
- Jurisdiction: New Brunswick, Canada
- Headquarters: Fredericton, New Brunswick
- Parent department: Government of New Brunswick
- Website: Regional Development Corporation

The Regional Development Corporation (French: Société de développement régional) is a crown corporation in the Canadian province of New Brunswick. It administers a number of programs charged with promoting economic development in the various regions of New Brunswick.
