= Service New Brunswick =

Crown corporation providing government services in New Brunswick

- Company type: Crown corporation
- Founded: 1990s
- Headquarters: Fredericton, New Brunswick
- Area served: New Brunswick
- Key people: Aaron Kennedy (Minister)
- Owner: Government of New Brunswick
- Website: www.snb.ca

Service New Brunswick (French: Service Nouveau-Brunswick), commonly referred to as SNB, is a Crown corporation in the Canadian province of New Brunswick.

SNB was established in the late 1990s as part of a merger of the land registry duties of the New Brunswick Geographic Information Corporation, and various other public services provided by departments within the provincial government. SNB was the first public sector multi-service agency to be established in Canada.

In 2015, SNB merged with the New Brunswick Internal Services Agency (NBISA), FacilicorpNB and the Department of Government Services to create a single Crown corporation. This consolidation was designed to bring common services into a single entity that would more efficiently provide services to the provincial government and to members of the public.

A board of directors is responsible for the overall administration of the business and affairs of Service New Brunswick.

SNB consists of multiple lines of business:

- It delivers a number of services to the public on behalf of departments and agencies including the Canadian government and New Brunswick municipalities. SNB offers three channels of delivery: in person through a network of service centres; over the phone (TeleServices); and online at www.snb.ca.
- SNB provides common services to other sections of the provincial government, such as IT, payroll, procurement, collections, and translation services.
- SNB Health Services serves the provincial Regional Health Authorities by providing Clinical Engineering, Supply Chain, and Laundry and Linen services to hospitals and other healthcare providers.
- Property Assessment Services assesses the value of all lands, buildings and improvements in New Brunswick. This data is used to calculate annual property taxes, in partnership with the Department of Finance and the Department of Environment and Local Government.
- SNB operates the province's real and personal property registries, and provides information services to the public based on these registries.
- The corporation is responsible for maintaining the province's survey control network and topographic mapping system.

SNB has approximately 2,400 employees, and has an annual budget of approximately $266,000,000.
