= Bernard Lord =

Premier of New Brunswick from 1999 to 2006

Bernard Lord ONB KC
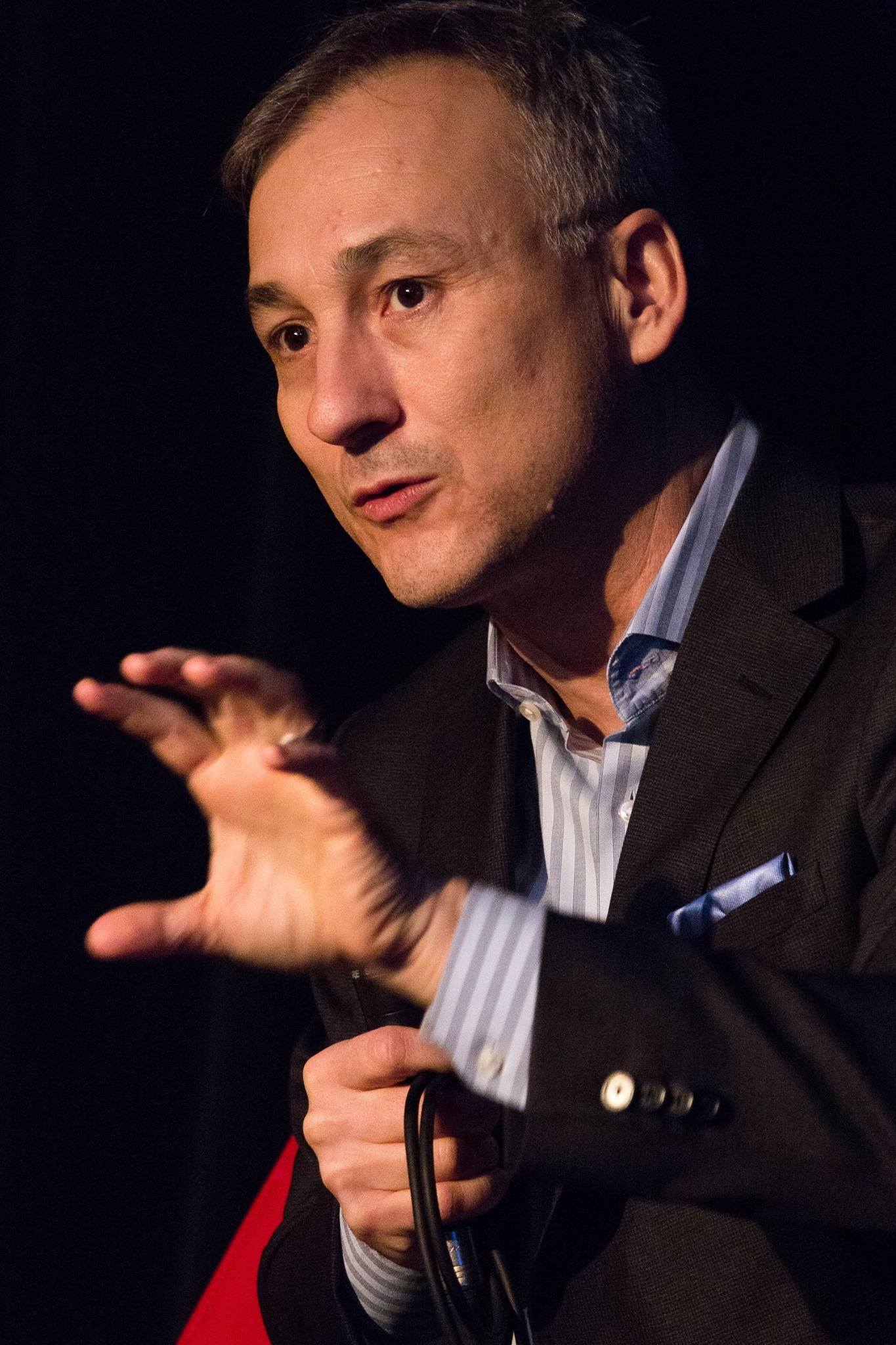
- Lord in 2017

30th Premier of New Brunswick
- In office June 21, 1999 – October 3, 2006
- Monarch: Elizabeth II
- Lieutenant Governor: Marilyn T. Counsell; Herménégilde Chiasson
- Deputy: Dale Graham
- Preceded by: Camille Thériault
- Succeeded by: Shawn Graham

MLA for Moncton East
- In office October 19, 1998 – January 31, 2007
- Preceded by: Ray Frenette
- Succeeded by: Chris Collins

Personal details
- Born: September 27, 1965 (age 61) Roberval, Quebec, Canada
- Party: Progressive Conservative
- Spouse: Diane Lord (m. 1990)

Bernard Lord (born September 27, 1965) is a Canadian lawyer, business executive and former politician. He served as the 30th premier of New Brunswick from 1999 to 2006. Lord was appointed as board chair of Ontario Power Generation in 2014. He is currently the CEO of Medavie Blue Cross.

== Early life ==
Lord was born in Roberval, Quebec, the youngest of four children of Marie-Émilie (Morin), a former teacher, and Ralph Frank Lord, a pilot. His father was anglophone and his mother was francophone, and he was raised in a bilingual household in Moncton, New Brunswick, where he spent the rest of his early life.

After graduating from high school, he earned a bachelor's degree in social science with a major in economics, as well as a bachelor's degree in common law, from the Université de Moncton. While Lord attended the Université de Moncton, he had some electoral success being elected the president of the Université de Moncton student union (FEECUM) and served for three terms. Lord married his wife Diane in 1990; they have two children. One of his brothers, Roger Lord, is an internationally acclaimed concert pianist.

== Election as leader ==
In 1997, Lord was elected leader of the PC Party of New Brunswick and then became the MLA for the district of Moncton East in a 1998 by-election. Much of Lord's success came from the countless months he spent meeting party members across New Brunswick, and in part because he was also flawlessly bilingual and able to draw a strong concentration of support in the Moncton area, one of four cities in which members could vote. Lord defeated Norman Betts, who was the perceived frontrunner, as well as Margaret-Ann Blaney, who, with Betts, would go on to serve in Lord's cabinet and Cleveland Allaby.

== Premier ==
On June 7, 1999, Lord's PC party overcame an early deficit in the polls to pull out a landslide victory in the provincial general election, winning 44 of 55 seats in the legislature. At just 33 years of age, Lord (on June 21) became one of the youngest Premiers in Canadian history.

Using the successful tactics from the 1994 United States elections of Republican Congressional leader, Newt Gingrich, Lord was elected on his "200 Days of Change" platform, consisting of 20 promises of things he would do within the first 200 days of his mandate if he were elected premier.

In 2002, Lord delivered what the media and others hailed as an electrifying speech at the national Progressive Conservative Party of Canada convention in Edmonton, Alberta, which started speculation that he might run for a job in federal politics, specifically, replacing Joe Clark as federal PC leader. A very strong movement of influential conservatives erupted after Edmonton to lobby the Premier into federal politics, everything from a website to a coast to coast organization was being set up to woo the Premier to leave Fredericton and head to Ottawa. A short time later, Lord shot down any notions that that might happen, choosing instead to remain focused on provincial politics and the 2003 New Brunswick election.

That election was not kind to Lord, with the Liberals using the issue of rising car insurance to catch the PC Party off guard. The Party wasn't able to regain its footing until relatively late in the campaign, and barely held on to a majority over the Liberal Party led by Shawn Graham.

Lord was again courted for federal politics in late 2003, when the PC Party of Canada and the Canadian Alliance merged into the Conservative Party of Canada. In the end, Lord opted to stay in New Brunswick due to his young family and the fact that his departure would force his party into a minority government situation.

In 2004, Lord's government came under fire over a variety of unpopular stances, most notably changes to health care. These included closures of beds at hospitals in Miramichi and Dalhousie, and consolidation of four hospitals in the Upper Saint John River Valley into one. The Liberals, under leader Shawn Graham, led in public opinion polls as of the summer of 2004 and maintained that lead; however, Lord remained the most favoured Leader to be Premier of New Brunswick for a time.

On August 10, 2006, Lord announced that on August 19, he would be calling an election for September 18. This election call was in response to the loss of a caucus member, Peter Mesheau, who announced his intention to resign to work in the private sector. The resignation would have caused Lord to slip into a minority government and the subsequent by-election could have flipped the balance of power to the Liberals. Lord decided that instead of a by-election deciding the fate of his government, he would let the people choose. Some observers saw Lord's election call as a bold move considering his popularity numbers had only recently started to surpass the Liberal leader Graham.

In the head-to-head campaign that followed, Lord lost the government to the Liberals, who took 29 seats to 26 for the Conservatives. The Tories did manage to win the popular vote, besting the Liberals 47.5% to 47.2%. Lord left the Premier's Office on October 3, 2006.

On December 13, 2006, Lord announced that he was resigning as PC leader, further he said he would resign his legislative seat in Moncton East on January 31, 2007.

== Post-premiership ==
After leaving politics, Lord took a position as senior counsel with the law firm McCarthy Tetrault, splitting time between their offices in Montreal and Ottawa while continuing to maintain his residence in Fredericton.

On December 3, 2007, Stephen Harper, the Prime Minister of Canada, appointed Lord as head of the Bilingualism Committee. He reviewed Canada's Official Language Laws, and he made suggestions where improvements can be made. In December 2007, Lord was named as the president of the 2009 CHL Memorial Cup selection-committee.

In October 2008, it was announced that Lord would be appointed as president and CEO of the Canadian Wireless Telecommunications Association, a lobbyist group that represents cellular, messaging, mobile radio, fixed wireless and mobile satellite carriers, as well as companies that develop and produce products and services for the industry.

Lord was named in 2013 to the board of Ontario's public utility provider, Ontario Power Generation, and he was appointed as board chair in March 2014 by the government of Kathleen Wynne. He was tasked with cutting expenses after an auditor's report that came out late in the term of his predecessor, Jake Epp, criticized the agency for cost overruns and excessive executive wages and bonuses.

On June 15, 2016, Lord was named as the chief executive officer of Medavie Blue Cross effective September 1, 2016.

== Honours ==
- In 2007, he was awarded the Order of New Brunswick
- Grand Officier de l'Ordre de la Pleiade (La Francophonie)
- Queen's Counsel, 2011

New Brunswick provincial government of Bernard Lord
Cabinet posts (5)
Predecessor	Office	Successor
Camille Thériault	Premier of New Brunswick; 1999–2006	Shawn Graham
Camille Thériault	President of the Executive Council; 1999–2006	Shawn Graham
Percy Mockler	Minister of Intergovernmental Affairs; 2006; Mockler was designated as Minister of Intergovernmental and International Relations	Shawn Graham
himself	Minister of Intergovernmental and International Relations; 2003; Lord changed the portfolio from Minister of Intergovernmental Affairs	Percy Mockler
Bernard Thériault	Minister of Intergovernmental Affairs; 1999–2003; Thériault was Minister of Intergovernmental and Aboriginal Affairs, Lord succeeded himself as Minister of Intergovernmental and International Relations	himself
Special Cabinet Responsibilities
Predecessor	Title	Successor
new designation	Minister responsible for Youth; 2003–2006	Kelly Lamrock
new designation	Minister responsible for the Status of the Disabled Persons; 2003–2006	Shawn Graham
Jean Paul Savoie	Minister responsible for the Regional Development Corporation; 1999–2006	Jeannot Volpé
new designation	Minister responsible for eNB; 2001–2003	Peter Mesheau
Greg Byrne	Minister responsible for the Service New Brunswick; 1999–2000	Peter Mesheau
Political offices
Preceded by Elvy Robichaud	Leader of the Opposition in the Legislative Assembly of New Brunswick; 1998–1999; 2006–2007	Succeeded by Camille Thériault
Preceded by Shawn Graham	Leader of the Opposition in the Legislative Assembly of New Brunswick; 1998–1999; 2006–2007	Succeeded by Jeannot Volpé
Preceded by Bernard Valcourt	Leader of the Progressive Conservative Party of New Brunswick; 1997–2006	Succeeded by Jeannot Volpé (interim)
Legislative Assembly of New Brunswick
Vacant Title last held by Ray Frenette (Liberal)	MLA for Moncton East; 1998–2007	Succeeded by Chris Collins (Liberal)
