= Department of Post-Secondary Education, Training and Labour (New Brunswick) =

Agency overview
- Type: Line Department (civil service)
- Jurisdiction: New Brunswick
- Employees: 732 (as of 2022)
- Annual budget: $662,933,000 CAD (2022-2023)
- Minister responsible: Hon. Greg Turner
- Deputy Minister responsible: Dan Mills
- Parent department: Government of New Brunswick
- Website: https://www2.gnb.ca/content/gnb/en/departments/post-secondary_education_training_and_labour.html

The Department of Post-Secondary Education, Training and Labour is a department in the Government of New Brunswick responsible for "ensuring the New Brunswick workforce is competitive by making strategic investments in people through innovative programs, services and partnerships." The Department oversees the province's public universities and colleges, the provincial student loan system, public libraries, labour, adult learning and literacy, as well as immigration. There are a number of Acts under the Department's legislative purview, including New Brunswick's Employment Standards Act, Workers' Compensation Act and Human Rights Act. Several arms-length agencies and Crown corporations report to the Legislative Assembly of New Brunswick through the Minister responsible for the Department, such as the Labour and Employment Board, the Human Rights Commission, WorkSafeNB and New Brunswick's community colleges.

== Organizational structure ==
The Department, led by the Deputy Minister who acts as its chief administrator, is divided into four divisions, each of which is led by an Assistant Deputy Minister:

- Labour and Strategic Services, which includes the Finance, Human Resources, Employment Standards and Policy branches, as well as the New Brunswick Human Rights Commission;
- Post-Secondary Education, which includes the Post-Secondary Relations and Student Financial Assistance branches;
- Adult Learning and Employment, which includes WorkingNB, SkilledTradesNB and the New Brunswick Public Libraries Service; and
- Immigration, which includes the Operations, Compliance and Integrity, Workforce Development and Strategic Partnerships and Integration branches.

In May 2024, the provincial government announced that the Department would be taking on responsibility for administering and enforcing New Brunswick's new Accessibility Act, which will include an Accessibility Office housed within the Department's Labour and Strategic Services Division, as well as an Accessibility Advisory Board providing advice to the Minister.

== Controversies and criticism ==
The Department has come under criticism over the years on a number of fronts.

=== Ending the Free Tuition Program ===
In April 2019, the Department announced the end of the Free Tuition Program, a resource that layered federal and provincial funds to entirely offset tuition costs for students attending public universities whose families earned below a certain threshold. The program was replaced with the Renewed Tuition Bursary, under which students would now receive a maximum provincial grant of $3,000 for university students or $1,500 for college students, based upon their family size and income. This was a substantial cut to the previous thresholds, which saw university students being eligible for provincial grants up to $10,000 and up to $5,000 for college students. The government contended that the Renewed Tuition Bursary was fairer because it allowed students of both public and private post-secondary institutions to receive the financial assistance. However, student organizations like the New Brunswick Student Alliance strongly rejected the changes, arguing that they led to less up-front funding for post-secondary students and ultimately more debt.

=== Cancelling NB-EI Connect ===
In June 2022, the Department confirmed that it was cancelling the New Brunswick – Employment Insurance (NB-EI) Connect Program, which had allowed thousands of students to receive EI while pursuing post-secondary studies. The initial aim of the Program was to empower individuals experiencing gaps in their employment to improve their career skills through post-secondary education and training. However, in practise, the Program was being used by thousands of full-time university students — an increasing number of whom each year — who had no previous significant labour market attachment, to receive EI while in school, essentially making it a quasi-universal basic income scheme for students. Since EI is a federal domain of responsibility and funding that is designed to help Canadians who are under- or unemployed rejoin the labour market, the federal government felt that the NB-EI Connect Program was contrary to the federal Employment Insurance Act and demanded that New Brunswick cancel it.

News of the program's cancellation was first leaked by Jean-Sebastian Leger, then president of the Fédération étudiante du Centre universitaire de Moncton, after the Department had sent an email to student unions advising of the change, but saying that there would be no public announcement thereof. Students throughout New Brunswick heavily criticized the cancellation, citing increasing costs of living and tuition and little other provincial funding supports. The liberal opposition's reaction was that, while they did not call for the Program to be reinstated, they believed that the Government should be doing more to support post-secondary students and ensure the affordability and accessibility of higher education.

=== Weakening public sector labour legislation ===
In November 2022, Trevor Holder, Minister of Post-Secondary Education, Training and Labour, tabled a Bill to amend provincial labour legislation governing public sector bargaining. The amendments in the Bill implemented stricter rules on how public-sector strikes and lockouts can occur — requiring unions give 72 hours' notice before a strike, as well as allowing government to change the work schedules of designated essential workers during a strike and even, in certain cases, replace them with non-unionized replacement workers — changes that were largely viewed as shifting bargaining power away from unions.

Stephen Drost, president of the Canadian Union of Public Employees (CUPE) in New Brunswick, said, "This is nothing more than stripping away the rights of these workers to have free collective bargaining. This act … is certainly not going to improve labour relations in this province." Jennifer Murray, Atlantic regional director of Unifor, the largest Canadian private sector union, said, “It’s deeply concerning to see the Higgs government attempt to take away workers’ rights ahead of major bargaining with key public sector workers in the province next year."

Holder responded in the Legislature that the Bill was simply an effort to bring "clarity" to rules surrounding essential workers, which he said the Labour and Employment Board has described as ambiguous. "We need to dial down the rhetoric a little bit, work together as New Brunswickers and, at the end of the day, see this for what it is."

== History ==
The department was established as the Department of Post-Secondary Education and Training on February 14, 2006 when Premier Bernard Lord restructured the New Brunswick Cabinet, amalgamating the former Department of Training and Employment Development with the post-secondary education branch of the Department of Education. It was later renamed the Department of Post-Secondary Education, Training and Labour by Premier Shawn Graham when he took office, as organized labour had questioned why there was no "labour" minister.

Between 2017 and 2018, responsibility for the Department was split between two ministerial portfolios: a Minister of Post-Secondary Education and a Minister of Labour, Employment and Population Growth. Following the 2018 election, in which Blaine Higgs took power, the Department returned to being run by a single minister.

== Ministers responsible ==
Minister	Term	Administration	Notes
Minister of Post-Secondary Education, Training and Labour			In 2018, Premier Blaine Higgs transferred responsibility for the Department back to one minister, as opposed to two.
Greg Turner	February 2, 2024 - current	under Blaine Higgs	In 2018, Premier Blaine Higgs transferred responsibility for the Department back to one minister, as opposed to two.
Arlene Dunn	June 23, 2023 - February 2, 2024	under Blaine Higgs	In 2018, Premier Blaine Higgs transferred responsibility for the Department back to one minister, as opposed to two.
Trevor Holder	November 9, 2018 - June 23, 2023	under Blaine Higgs	In 2018, Premier Blaine Higgs transferred responsibility for the Department back to one minister, as opposed to two.
Minister of Post-Secondary Education			In 2017, Premier Brian Gallant bifurcated responsibility for the Department of Post-Secondary Education, Training and Labour into two ministerial portfolios: Minister of Post-Secondary Education and Minister of Labour, Employment and Population Growth
Roger Melanson	September 5, 2017 - November 9, 2018	under Brian Gallant	In 2017, Premier Brian Gallant bifurcated responsibility for the Department of Post-Secondary Education, Training and Labour into two ministerial portfolios: Minister of Post-Secondary Education and Minister of Labour, Employment and Population Growth
Minister of Labour, Employment and Population Growth			In 2017, Premier Brian Gallant bifurcated responsibility for the Department of Post-Secondary Education, Training and Labour into two ministerial portfolios: Minister of Post-Secondary Education and Minister of Labour, Employment and Population Growth
Gilles LePage	September 5, 2017 - November 9, 2018	under Brian Gallant	In 2017, Premier Brian Gallant bifurcated responsibility for the Department of Post-Secondary Education, Training and Labour into two ministerial portfolios: Minister of Post-Secondary Education and Minister of Labour, Employment and Population Growth
Minister of Post-Secondary Education, Training and Labour			In 2016, Premier Shawn Graham added ‘Labour’ to the portfolio, creating the Department of Post-Secondary Education, Training and Labour, which continued under Premier Brian Gallant.
Donald Arseneault	June 6, 2016 - September 5, 2017	under Brian Gallant	In 2016, Premier Shawn Graham added ‘Labour’ to the portfolio, creating the Department of Post-Secondary Education, Training and Labour, which continued under Premier Brian Gallant.
Francine Landry	October 7, 2014 - June 6, 2016	under Brian Gallant	In 2016, Premier Shawn Graham added ‘Labour’ to the portfolio, creating the Department of Post-Secondary Education, Training and Labour, which continued under Premier Brian Gallant.
Jody Carr	September 23, 2013 - October 7, 2014	under David Alward	In 2016, Premier Shawn Graham added ‘Labour’ to the portfolio, creating the Department of Post-Secondary Education, Training and Labour, which continued under Premier Brian Gallant.
Danny Soucy	October 9, 2012 - September 23, 2013	under David Alward	In 2016, Premier Shawn Graham added ‘Labour’ to the portfolio, creating the Department of Post-Secondary Education, Training and Labour, which continued under Premier Brian Gallant.
Martine Coulombe	October 12, 2010 - October 8, 2012	under David Alward	In 2016, Premier Shawn Graham added ‘Labour’ to the portfolio, creating the Department of Post-Secondary Education, Training and Labour, which continued under Premier Brian Gallant.
Donald Arseneault	November 12, 2008 - October 12, 2010	under Shawn Graham	In 2016, Premier Shawn Graham added ‘Labour’ to the portfolio, creating the Department of Post-Secondary Education, Training and Labour, which continued under Premier Brian Gallant.
Ed Doherty	October 3, 2006 - November 12, 2008	under Shawn Graham	In 2016, Premier Shawn Graham added ‘Labour’ to the portfolio, creating the Department of Post-Secondary Education, Training and Labour, which continued under Premier Brian Gallant.
Minister of Post-Secondary Education and Training			In 2006, Premier Bernard Lord merged the Department of Training and Employment Development with the post-secondary education branch of the Department of Education to form the Department of Post-Secondary Education and Training.
Jody Carr	February 14, 2006 - October 3, 2006	under Bernard Lord	In 2006, Premier Bernard Lord merged the Department of Training and Employment Development with the post-secondary education branch of the Department of Education to form the Department of Post-Secondary Education and Training.
Margaret-Ann Blaney	2003 - February 2006	under Bernard Lord	In 2006, Premier Bernard Lord merged the Department of Training and Employment Development with the post-secondary education branch of the Department of Education to form the Department of Post-Secondary Education and Training.
Minister of Training and Employment Development			In 2000, the Department of Advanced Education and Labour merged with certain responsibilities from the Department of Human Resources Development (previously the Department of Family and Community Services) to create the Department of Training and Employment Development.
Norman McFarlane	2000 - 2003	under Bernard Lord	In 2000, the Department of Advanced Education and Labour merged with certain responsibilities from the Department of Human Resources Development (previously the Department of Family and Community Services) to create the Department of Training and Employment Development.
Minister of Labour			In 1998, the words ‘Advanced Education’ and ‘Training’ disappeared from the title, but responsibility was still with this department, and the Department was still called the Department of Advanced Education and Labour. Also in 1998, responsibility for New Brunswick's community colleges shifted from the Department of Education to the Department of Advanced Education and Labour.
Norman McFarlane	1999 - 2000	under Bernard Lord	In 1998, the words ‘Advanced Education’ and ‘Training’ disappeared from the title, but responsibility was still with this department, and the Department was still called the Department of Advanced Education and Labour. Also in 1998, responsibility for New Brunswick's community colleges shifted from the Department of Education to the Department of Advanced Education and Labour.
Joan Kingston	1998 - 1999	under Frank McKenna	In 1998, the words ‘Advanced Education’ and ‘Training’ disappeared from the title, but responsibility was still with this department, and the Department was still called the Department of Advanced Education and Labour. Also in 1998, responsibility for New Brunswick's community colleges shifted from the Department of Education to the Department of Advanced Education and Labour.
Minister of Advanced Education and Labour			In 1992, the Department of Labour merged with the Department of Advanced Education and Training, creating the Department of Advanced Education and Labour.
Roland MacIntyre	1995 - 1998	under Frank McKenna	In 1992, the Department of Labour merged with the Department of Advanced Education and Training, creating the Department of Advanced Education and Labour.
Camille Thériault	1994 - 1995	under Frank McKenna	In 1992, the Department of Labour merged with the Department of Advanced Education and Training, creating the Department of Advanced Education and Labour.
Vaughn Blaney	1992 – 1994	under Frank McKenna	In 1992, the Department of Labour merged with the Department of Advanced Education and Training, creating the Department of Advanced Education and Labour.
Russell H. King	1988 – 1991	under Frank McKenna	In 1992, the Department of Labour merged with the Department of Advanced Education and Training, creating the Department of Advanced Education and Labour.
Minister of Labour			In 1992, the Department of Labour merged with the Department of Advanced Education and Training, creating the Department of Advanced Education and Labour.
Michael McKee	1988 – 1991	under Frank McKenna	
Minister of Advanced Education and Labour			In 1986, responsibility for Human Resources was shifted from the Department of Labour and Human Resources (specifically, the Labour Market Services Branch) to the Department of Community Colleges, resulting in the Department of Labour and the Department of Advanced Education and Training.
Mable M. DeWare	1986 – 1987	under Richard Hatfield	In 1986, responsibility for Human Resources was shifted from the Department of Labour and Human Resources (specifically, the Labour Market Services Branch) to the Department of Community Colleges, resulting in the Department of Labour and the Department of Advanced Education and Training.
Minister of Labour			In 1986, responsibility for Human Resources was shifted from the Department of Labour and Human Resources (specifically, the Labour Market Services Branch) to the Department of Community Colleges, resulting in the Department of Labour and the Department of Advanced Education and Training.
Joseph Mombourquette	1986 – 1987	under Richard Hatfield	In 1986, responsibility for Human Resources was shifted from the Department of Labour and Human Resources (specifically, the Labour Market Services Branch) to the Department of Community Colleges, resulting in the Department of Labour and the Department of Advanced Education and Training.
Minister of Community Colleges			
Mable M. DeWare	1983 – 1986	under Richard Hatfield	
Minister of Labour and Human Resources
Joseph Mombourquette	1983 – 1986	under Richard Hatfield	
Minister of Continuing Education
Mable M. DeWare	1981 – 1983	under Richard Hatfield	
Minister of Labour and Human Resources
Joseph Mombourquette	1981 – 1983	under Richard Hatfield	
Minister of Continuing Education
Charles G. Gallagher	1980 – 1981	under Richard Hatfield	In 1980, the Department of Continuing Education was created by an amendment to the Executive Council Act (1980, c.20, s.1). In 1980 to 1981, the Department of Labour and Manpower annual reports had no mention of an ‘Industrial Training and Certification Branch’, but, in the 1982-1983 annual report, this branch shows up in the structure. Thus, it would appear that the Department of Continuing Education, which co-existed with the Department of Labour and Manpower at this time, was responsible for the community colleges rather than industrial training. The Legislative Library has no annual reports for the Department of Continuing Education.
Minister of Labour and Manpower			From 1974 to 1980, the responsibility for community colleges was under the Minister of Education’s portfolio, which were: 1976 - 1980: Charles G. Gallagher; 1974 - 1975: Gerald Merrithew
Mable M. DeWare	1979 – 1981	under Richard Hatfield	From 1974 to 1980, the responsibility for community colleges was under the Minister of Education’s portfolio, which were: 1976 - 1980: Charles G. Gallagher; 1974 - 1975: Gerald Merrithew
Lawrence Garvie	1978 – 1979	under Richard Hatfield	From 1974 to 1980, the responsibility for community colleges was under the Minister of Education’s portfolio, which were: 1976 - 1980: Charles G. Gallagher; 1974 - 1975: Gerald Merrithew
Paul S. Creaghan	March - November 1977	under Richard Hatfield	From 1974 to 1980, the responsibility for community colleges was under the Minister of Education’s portfolio, which were: 1976 - 1980: Charles G. Gallagher; 1974 - 1975: Gerald Merrithew
Rodman E. Logan	1975 – 1978	under Richard Hatfield	From 1974 to 1980, the responsibility for community colleges was under the Minister of Education’s portfolio, which were: 1976 - 1980: Charles G. Gallagher; 1974 - 1975: Gerald Merrithew
Minister of Labour			From 1974 to 1980, the responsibility for community colleges was under the Minister of Education’s portfolio, which were: 1976 - 1980: Charles G. Gallagher; 1974 - 1975: Gerald Merrithew
Rodman E. Logan	1970 - 1975	under Richard Hatfield	From 1974 to 1980, the responsibility for community colleges was under the Minister of Education’s portfolio, which were: 1976 - 1980: Charles G. Gallagher; 1974 - 1975: Gerald Merrithew
Fernand Nadeau	February- November 1970	under Richard Hatfield	From 1974 to 1980, the responsibility for community colleges was under the Minister of Education’s portfolio, which were: 1976 - 1980: Charles G. Gallagher; 1974 - 1975: Gerald Merrithew
H. H. Williamson	1967 – 1970	under Louis Robichaud	
Kenneth J. Webber	1965 – 1967	under Louis Robichaud	

== See also ==
- Department of Post-Secondary Education and Training (New Brunswick)
