= Department of Government Services (New Brunswick) =

Agency overview
- Formed: 2012
- Preceding agency: Department of Supply and Services; Department of Public Works and Highways
- Jurisdiction: New Brunswick
- Agency executive: Ed Doherty, Minister of Government Services
- Parent department: Government of New Brunswick

The Department of Government Services is a part of the Government of New Brunswick. It is charged with providing central services, including purchase of goods and services, provincial archives, corporate marketing services, translation and printing, to government departments and agencies. It also oversees the Crown agencies Service New Brunswick and the New Brunswick Internal Services Agency.

Part of the Department of Public Works and Highways until 1967, it was known as the Department of Public Works until 1972, and the Department of Supply and Services until 2012. In 2012, its ceded responsibility for maintenance of government buildings to the Department of Transportation and Infrastructure and took on responsibility for corporate marketing for the government.

== Ministers ==
#	Minister	Term	Administration
Minister of Public Works
1.	Raymond Doucett	November 20, 1967 - November 12, 1970	under Louis Robichaud
2.	J. Stewart Brooks	November 12, 1970 - July 18, 1972	under Richard Hatfield
Minister of Supply and Services
3.	Carl Mooers	July 18, 1972 - December 3, 1974	under Hatfield
4.	George Horton	December 3, 1974 - December 20, 1976	under Hatfield
5.	Harold Fanjoy	December 20, 1976 - October 20, 1982	under Hatfield
6.	Edwin G. Allen	October 20, 1982 - October 3, 1985	under Hatfield
7.	C. W. Harmer	October 3, 1985 - October 27, 1987	under Hatfield
8.	Bruce Smith	October 27, 1987 - October 9, 1991	under Frank McKenna
9.	Laureen Jarrett	October 9, 1991 - April 27, 1994	under Frank McKenna
10.	James E. Lockyer	April 27, 1994 - September 12, 1995	under Frank McKenna
	Bruce Smith (2nd time)	September 12, 1995 - July 21, 1997	under Frank McKenna
11.	Peter LeBlanc	July 21, 1997 - May 14, 1998	under Ray Frenette
12.	Greg O'Donnell	May 14, 1998 - June 21, 1999	under Camille Thériault
13.	Dale Graham	June 21, 1999 - February 14, 2006	under Bernard Lord
14.	Bev Harrison	February 14, 2006 - October 3, 2006	under Bernard Lord
15.	Roly MacIntyre	October 3, 2006 - January 17, 2008	under Shawn Graham
	Jack Keir (acting)	January 17, 2008 - November 12, 2008	under Shawn Graham
16.	Ed Doherty	November 12, 2008 - October 12, 2010	under Shawn Graham
17.	Claude Williams	October 12, 2010 - March 15, 2012	under David Alward
Minister of Government Services
18.	Craig Leonard	March 15, 2012 - October 9, 2012	under David Alward
19.	Sue Stultz	October 9, 2012 - October 7, 2014	under David Alward
20.	Ed Doherty	October 7, 2014 - September 5, 2017	Brian Gallant
21.	Serge Rousselle	September 5, 2017-	Brian Gallant
