= Woodstock (electoral district) =

Defunct provincial electoral district in New Brunswick, Canada

New Brunswick electoral district
- Coordinates: 46.143°N 67.635°W

Defunct provincial electoral district
- Legislature: Legislative Assembly of New Brunswick
- District created: 1973
- District abolished: 2013
- First contested: 1974
- Last contested: 2010

Woodstock was a provincial electoral district for the Legislative Assembly of New Brunswick, Canada.

== Members of the Legislative Assembly ==
Assembly	Years	Member	Party
Carleton South; Riding created from Carleton (1834–1974)
48th	1974–1978	Edison Stairs	Progressive Conservative
49th	1978–1982	Steven Porter	Progressive Conservative
50th	1982–1987	Steven Porter	Progressive Conservative
51st	1987–1991	Bruce Smith	Liberal
52nd	1991–1995	Bruce Smith	Liberal
Woodstock
53rd	1995–1999	Bruce Smith	Liberal
54th	1999–2003	David Alward	Progressive Conservative
55th	2003–2006	David Alward	Progressive Conservative
56th	2006–2010	David Alward	Progressive Conservative
57th	2010–2014	David Alward	Progressive Conservative
Riding dissolved into Carleton (2014–) and York

== Election results ==
=== Woodstock ===
2010 New Brunswick general election
Party	Candidate	Votes	%	±%
Progressive Conservative	David Alward	4,672	67.31	+13.21
Independent	Dale Allen	995	14.34	–
Liberal	Jeff Bradbury	709	10.21	-30.86
New Democratic	Conrad Anderson	278	4.01	-0.82
People's Alliance	David Kennedy	185	2.67	–
Green	Todd Antworth	102	1.47	–
Total valid votes		6,941	100.0	
Total rejected ballots		14	0.20	
Turnout		6,955	68.67	
Eligible voters		10,128		
Progressive Conservative hold		Swing		-0.56

2006 New Brunswick general election
Party	Candidate	Votes	%	±%
Progressive Conservative	David Alward	3,867	54.10	-9.06
Liberal	Art Slipp	2,936	41.07	+8.15
New Democratic	Garth Brewer	345	4.83	+0.91
Total valid votes		7,148	100.0	
Progressive Conservative hold		Swing		-8.60

2003 New Brunswick general election
Party	Candidate	Votes	%	±%
Progressive Conservative	David Alward	4,605	63.16	-7.43
Liberal	Lorne Drake	2,400	32.92	+6.70
New Democratic	Nancy Reid	286	3.92	+0.73
Total valid votes		7,291	100.0	
Progressive Conservative hold		Swing		-7.06

1999 New Brunswick general election
Party	Candidate	Votes	%	±%
Progressive Conservative	David Alward	5,354	70.59	+30.25
Liberal	James W. Andow	1,989	26.22	-17.39
New Democratic	Sheila Moore	242	3.19	-3.80
Total valid votes		7,585	100.0	
Progressive Conservative gain from Liberal		Swing		+23.82

1995 New Brunswick general election
Party	Candidate	Votes	%	±%
Liberal	Bruce Smith	3,306	43.61	-0.03
Progressive Conservative	Fred Hanson	3,058	40.34	+24.57
Confederation of Regions	Lynn Avery	687	9.06	-27.03
New Democratic	David Kennedy	530	6.99	+2.49
Total valid votes		7,581	100.0	
Liberal hold		Swing		-12.30

=== Carleton South ===
1991 New Brunswick general election
Party	Candidate	Votes	%	±%
Liberal	Bruce Smith	2,462	43.64	-13.07
Confederation of Regions	Jerry Covey	2,036	36.09	–
Progressive Conservative	Bill Hamilton	890	15.77	-21.90
New Democratic	Arthur L. Slipp	254	4.50	-1.12
Total valid votes		5,642	100.0	
Liberal hold		Swing		-24.58

1987 New Brunswick general election
Party	Candidate	Votes	%	±%
Liberal	Bruce Smith	3,059	56.71	+24.73
Progressive Conservative	Steven Porter	2,032	37.67	-20.94
New Democratic	Arthur L. Slipp	303	5.62	-3.78
Total valid votes		5,394	100.0	
Liberal gain from Progressive Conservative		Swing		+22.84

1982 New Brunswick general election
Party	Candidate	Votes	%	±%
Progressive Conservative	Steven P. Porter	2,811	58.61	+6.91
Liberal	Stephen A.R. "Steve" Paget	1,534	31.98	-7.65
New Democratic	Arthur L. Slipp	451	9.40	+0.72
Total valid votes		4,796	100.0	
Progressive Conservative hold		Swing		+7.28

1978 New Brunswick general election
Party	Candidate	Votes	%	±%
Progressive Conservative	Steven P. Porter	2,317	51.70	-4.32
Liberal	Pat Saunders	1,776	39.63	-1.91
New Democratic	Garth Brewer	389	8.68	+7.19
Total valid votes		4,482	100.0	
Progressive Conservative hold		Swing		-1.20

1974 New Brunswick general election
Party	Candidate	Votes	%
Progressive Conservative	Edison Stairs	2,438	56.02
Liberal	Gerals Phillips	1,808	41.54
New Democratic	Richard J. Parker	65	1.49
Independent	George R. Johnston	41	0.94
Total valid votes		4,352	100.0
The previous multi-member riding of Carleton went totally Progressive Conservative in the last election, with Edison Stairs being one of three incumbents.

== See also ==
- List of New Brunswick provincial electoral districts
- Canadian provincial electoral districts
