= Saint John Harbour (electoral district) =

Provincial electoral district in New Brunswick, Canada

Coordinates: 45.2794°N 66.0417°W

New Brunswick electoral district
- The riding of Saint John Harbour (as it exists from 2023) in relation to other New Brunswick electoral districts

Provincial electoral district
- Legislature: Legislative Assembly of New Brunswick
MLA
David Hickey
Liberal
- District created: 1994
- First contested: 1995
- Last contested: 2024

Demographics
- Population (2011): 15,888
- Electors (2013): 11,131

Saint John Harbour (French: Saint-Jean-Havre) is a provincial electoral district for the Legislative Assembly of New Brunswick, Canada. It was represented from its creation for the 1995 election until October 13, 2005, by Elizabeth Weir, the leader of the New Democratic Party of New Brunswick from 1988 to September 25, 2005. Liberal Ed Doherty had then taken the spot by winning a by-election on November 14, 2005, and was re-elected in the 2006 general election.

The seat remained vacant after the resignation of PC Arlene Dunn on February 8, 2024, until the 2024 general election in October 2024 where David Hickey of the Liberals won.

Prior to the New Brunswick electoral redistribution of 1994, the district had moderately different boundaries. In that year it was split in two, with part being merged with Saint John South to form this current Saint John Harbour district, while the other half of the former Harbour district became a part of Saint John Lancaster.

The riding name refers to Saint John Harbour, which the district contains.

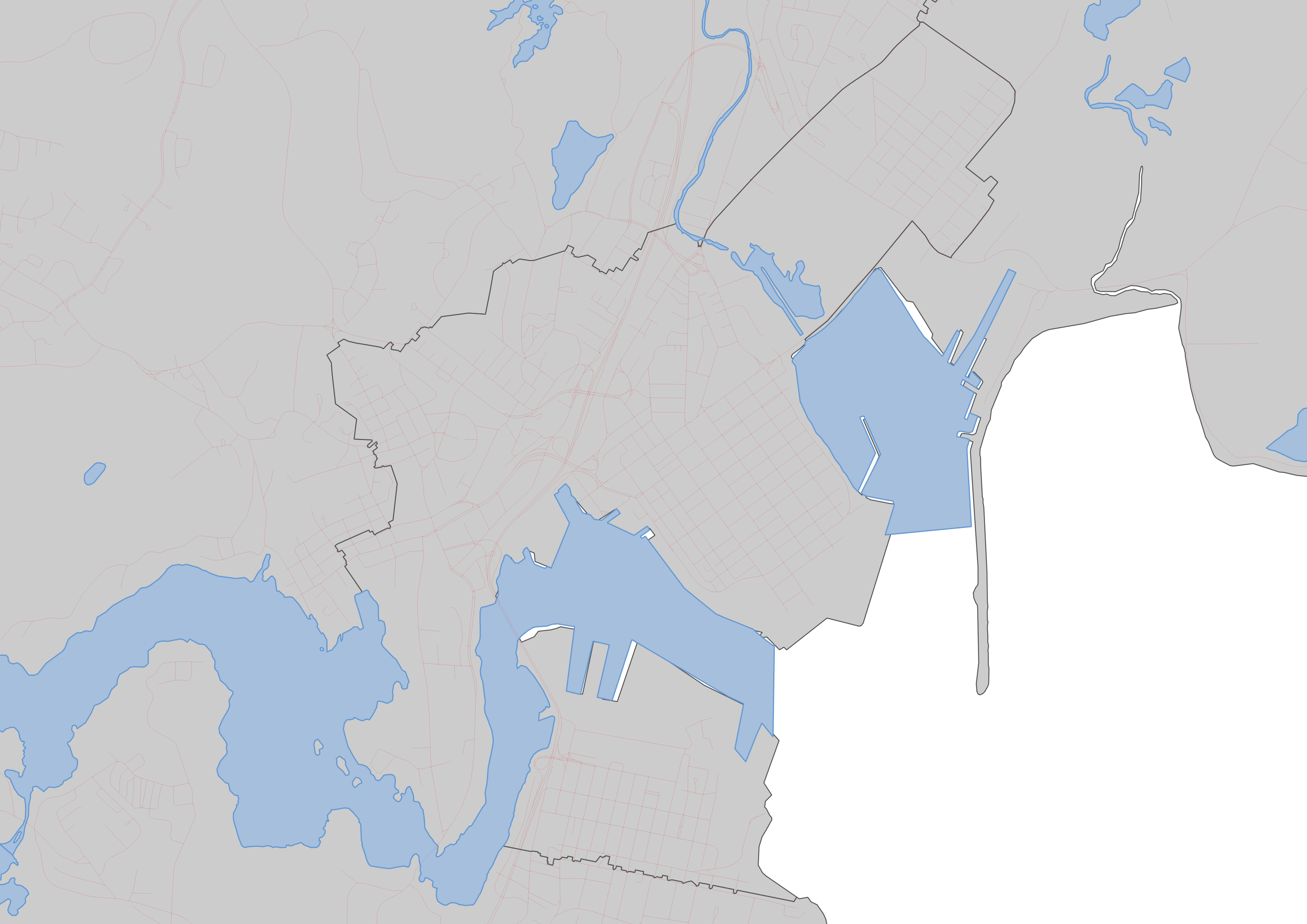
Saint John Harbour (as it exists from 2023) and the roads in the riding

== Redistribution changes ==
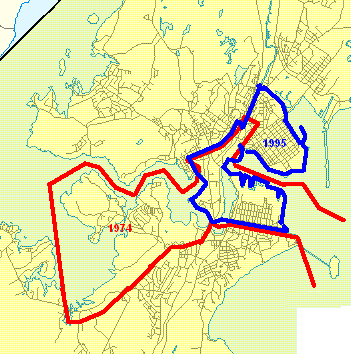
The boundaries of the original Saint John Harbour (red) overlaid with the boundaries of this district as it stood from 1995 to 2006 (blue)

This district was created in the early 1990s using all of the district of Saint John South and a small portion of the old Saint John Harbour district, resulting in some confusion as most of what had been known as Saint John Harbour became a part of Saint John Portland.

In the 2006 redistribution it underwent only minor changes.

== Members of the Legislative Assembly ==
Assembly	Years	Member	Party
Riding created from Saint John South and Saint John Harbour (1974–1995)
53rd	1995–1999	Elizabeth Weir	New Democratic
54th	1999–2003	Elizabeth Weir	New Democratic
55th	2003–2005	Elizabeth Weir	New Democratic
55th	2005–2006	Ed Doherty	Liberal
56th	2006–2010	Ed Doherty	Liberal
57th	2010–2014	Carl Killen	Progressive Conservative
58th	2014–2018	Ed Doherty	Liberal
59th	2018–2020	Gerry Lowe	Liberal
60th	2020–2024	Arlene Dunn	Progressive Conservative
61st	2024–Present	David Hickey	Liberal

== Election results ==
=== 2024 election ===
2024 New Brunswick general election
Party	Candidate	Votes	%	±%
Liberal	David Hickey	3,413	56.87	+33.6
Progressive Conservative	Adam Smith	1,563	26.05	-16.7
Green	Mariah Darling	715	11.91	-9.6
New Democratic	Kenneth Procter	228	3.80	-2.1
Libertarian	Shelley Craig	82	1.37	
Total valid votes		6,001	99.62	
Total rejected ballots		23	0.38	
Turnout		6,024	50.04	
Eligible voters		12,038		
Liberal gain from Progressive Conservative		Swing		+25.1
Source: Elections New Brunswick

=== 2020 election ===
2020 provincial election redistributed results
Party	%
Progressive Conservative	42.7
Liberal	23.3
Green	21.5
New Democratic	5.9
People's Alliance	3.9
Independents	2.7

2020 New Brunswick general election
Party	Candidate	Votes	%	±%
Progressive Conservative	Arlene Dunn	2,181	41.40	+8.68
Green	Brent Harris	1,224	23.23	+10.51
Liberal	Alice McKim	1,207	22.91	-9.98
New Democratic	Courtney Pyrke	309	5.87	-8.87
People's Alliance	Tony Gunn	186	3.53	-3.40
Independent	Arty Watson	114	2.16	–
Independent	Mike Cyr	47	0.89	–
Total valid votes		5,268		
Total rejected ballots		19	0.35	
Turnout		5,287	49.07	
Eligible voters		10,774		
Progressive Conservative gain from Liberal		Swing		+9.33

=== 2018 election ===
2018 New Brunswick general election
Party	Candidate	Votes	%	±%
Liberal	Gerry Lowe	1,865	32.89	+0.70
Progressive Conservative	Barry Ogden	1,855	32.72	+1.88
New Democratic	Jennifer McKenzie	836	14.74	-6.64
Green	Wayne Dryer	721	12.72	-0.67
People's Alliance	Margot Brideau	393	6.93	+4.74
Total valid votes		5,670	99.67	
Total rejected ballots		19	0.33	+0.03
Turnout		5,689	53.15	+6.37
Eligible voters		10,703		
Liberal hold		Swing		-0.59
Voting results declared after judicial recount.

=== 2014 election ===
2014 New Brunswick general election
Party	Candidate	Votes	%	±%
Liberal	Ed Doherty	1,686	32.19	+1.67
Progressive Conservative	Carl Killen	1,615	30.84	+0.16
New Democratic	Gary Stackhouse	1,120	21.39	-6.30
Green	Wayne Dryer	701	13.39	+7.96
People's Alliance	Arthur Watson	115	2.20	–
Total valid votes		5,237	99.70	
Total rejected ballots		16	0.30	
Turnout		5,253	46.78	
Eligible voters		11,229		
Liberal notional gain from Progressive Conservative		Swing		+0.76
Voting results declared after judicial recount.
Source: Elections New Brunswick

=== 2010 election ===
2010 New Brunswick general election
Party	Candidate	Votes	%	±%
Progressive Conservative	Carl Killen	1,333	30.68	+4.91
Liberal	Ed Doherty	1,326	30.52	-30.34
New Democratic	Wayne Dryer	1,203	27.69	+15.31
Independent	John Campbell	247	5.68	–
Green	Patty Higgins	236	5.43	–
Total valid votes		4,345	100.0	
Total rejected ballots		34	0.78	
Turnout		4,379	49.94	
Eligible voters		8,768		
Progressive Conservative gain from Liberal		Swing		+17.62
Source: Elections New Brunswick

=== 2006 election ===
Liberal Ed Doherty faced NDP candidate Dan Robichaud, whom he had run against in the 2005 by-election, as well as Conservative candidate Idee Inyangudor, an aide to a member of the cabinet and David Raymond Amos.

2006 New Brunswick general election
Party	Candidate	Votes	%	±%
Liberal	Ed Doherty	2,690	60.86	+5.61
Progressive Conservative	Idee Inyangudor	1,139	25.77	-0.75
New Democratic	Dan Robichaud	547	12.38	-4.75
Independent	David Raymond Amos	44	1.00	–
Total valid votes		4,420	100.0	
Liberal hold		Swing		+3.18

=== 2005 by-election ===
Elizabeth Weir, who had held this riding since its creation, resigned on October 13, 2005, and Premier of New Brunswick Bernard Lord called a by-election for the riding on October 15. The by-election was held on November 14, 2005, and was from the outset thought to be a close race between Lord's Progressive Conservatives and the Liberals with Weir's New Democrats unlikely to be able to compete without her personal popularity, particularly against the large organizations the other parties were likely to bring into the riding from around the province.

In the end the Liberals won the race in a landslide, more than doubling their vote over the previous election, with an absolute majority of 55% in a race with four candidates. Bernard Lord placed his reputation on the line, according to pundits, due to his choice of a high-profile candidate and his announcing over $50 million in spending over the course of the four-week campaign. As a result, many viewed this election as a huge blow to Lord's leadership and that it, along with two years of opinion polling showing Lord's PCs trailing the Liberals, the beginning of the end of his government.

The by-election also had immediate province-wide repercussions, bringing the standings in the legislature to 27 government, 27 opposition and the speaker. These standings would mean that the absence of one government member — even if he or she did not vote with the opposition — could defeat the government.

==== Timeline ====
- October 13, 2005 — Elizabeth Weir resigns from the seat to accept the post of President and CEO of the new Energy Efficiency and Conservation Agency.
- October 14, 2005 — Michelle Hooton announces she will be a candidate for the Progressive Conservatives in the by-election.
- October 15, 2005 — The Liberals and the Progressive Conservatives both hold their conventions, which were previously scheduled. Bernard Lord, the premier and leader of the PCs, drops the writ at his convention.
- October 17, 2005 — Hooton is acclaimed as PC candidate.
- October 18, 2005 — Dr. Ed Doherty is acclaimed as Liberal candidate.
- October 20, 2005:
  - Glen Jardine files papers to run as an independent.
  - Dan Robichaud is elected as New Democratic Party candidate in a three-way race, though only 19 people voted at his nominating meeting.
- October 21, 2005 — The Liberals announce their platform for the by-election, promising to invest $50 million in and around the riding if they win the next general election. The Liberals highlight that the majority of this money would come from federal funding which is available but Lord has refused to accept based on the conditions attached thereto. They argue that Lord is putting politics ahead of people.
- November 1, 2005 — An all candidates debate is co-hosted by Rogers Cable and the New Brunswick Telegraph-Journal newspaper, Independent Glen Jardine does not participate due to his late announcement as a candidate. The debate is televised twice, once on each of the two following days.
- November 8, 2005 — An all candidates debate is held live on popular radio talk show Talk of the Town on CFBC. All four candidates participate.
- November 9, 2005 — Michelle Hooton unveils her platform. Unlike the Liberal candidate, she does this individually. Where the Liberals promised what they would do with Doherty as a part of their team, Hooton promised what she would try to change from within the government if she was elected. She promised to change the government's position on nursing home payments, powers of municipalities in dealing with slum landlords, harbour cleanup, the St. Joseph's Hospital and affordable housing caps. She also pledged to build a new justice complex, a skateboard park, several community police stations and focus on waterfront development.
- November 11, 2005 — A Telegraph Journal / Corporate Research Associates poll reveals a runaway lead for Doherty. The poll shows Doherty at 31%, Hooton at 10%, Robichaud at 9% and Jardine at 1% with 34% undecided. Undecided voters were asked if they were leaning toward any candidate and, with leaning voters factored in, the result was Doherty 53%, Hooton 20%, Robichaud 19% and Jardine 2%.
- November 14, 2005 — Ed Doherty wins the election in a landslide. He takes the stage to read his victory speech at 9:05 local time (1 hour, 5 minutes after the polls have closed) to announce Michelle Hooton has conceded to him. As of his announcement, he is ahead of Hooton by more than a 2 to 1 margin.

==== Results ====
New Brunswick provincial by-election, 2005
Party	Candidate	Votes	%	±%
Liberal	Ed Doherty	2,367	55.25	+27.56
Progressive Conservative	Michelle Hooton	1,136	26.52	-2.40
New Democratic	Dan Robichaud	734	17.13	-26.26
Independent	Glen A. Jardine	47	1.10	–
Total valid votes		4,284	100.0	
Liberal gain from New Democratic		Swing		+14.98

=== Earlier results (1995–2003) ===
2003 New Brunswick general election
Party	Candidate	Votes	%	±%
New Democratic	Elizabeth Weir	1,929	43.39	-3.19
Progressive Conservative	Dennis Boyle	1,286	28.92	+2.72
Liberal	Anne-Marie Mullin	1,231	27.69	+1.52
Total valid votes		4,446	100.0	
New Democratic hold		Swing		-2.96

1999 New Brunswick general election
Party	Candidate	Votes	%	±%
New Democratic	Elizabeth Weir	2,398	46.58	-5.18
Progressive Conservative	Tim Clarke	1,349	26.20	+13.68
Liberal	Mark Thomas McNulty	1,347	26.17	-6.18
Natural Law	Thomas Mitchell	54	1.05	+0.12
Total valid votes		5,148	100.0	
New Democratic hold		Swing		-9.43

1995 New Brunswick general election
Party	Candidate	Votes	%	±%
New Democratic	Elizabeth Weir	2,901	51.76	
Liberal	Robert Higgins	1,813	32.35	
Progressive Conservative	Lloyd Betts	702	12.52	
Confederation of Regions	Roland Griffith	137	2.44	
Natural Law	Janice S. MacMillan	52	0.93	
Total valid votes		5,605	100.0	
New Democratic notional gain		Swing		

* This was a new riding created out of a merger of the whole of the electoral district of Saint John South and a part of the former district of Saint John Harbour. Weir was the incumbent from Saint John South.

== See also ==
- List of New Brunswick provincial electoral districts
- Canadian provincial electoral districts
