= David Hickey (politician) =

Canadian politician

The Honourable David Hickey MLA
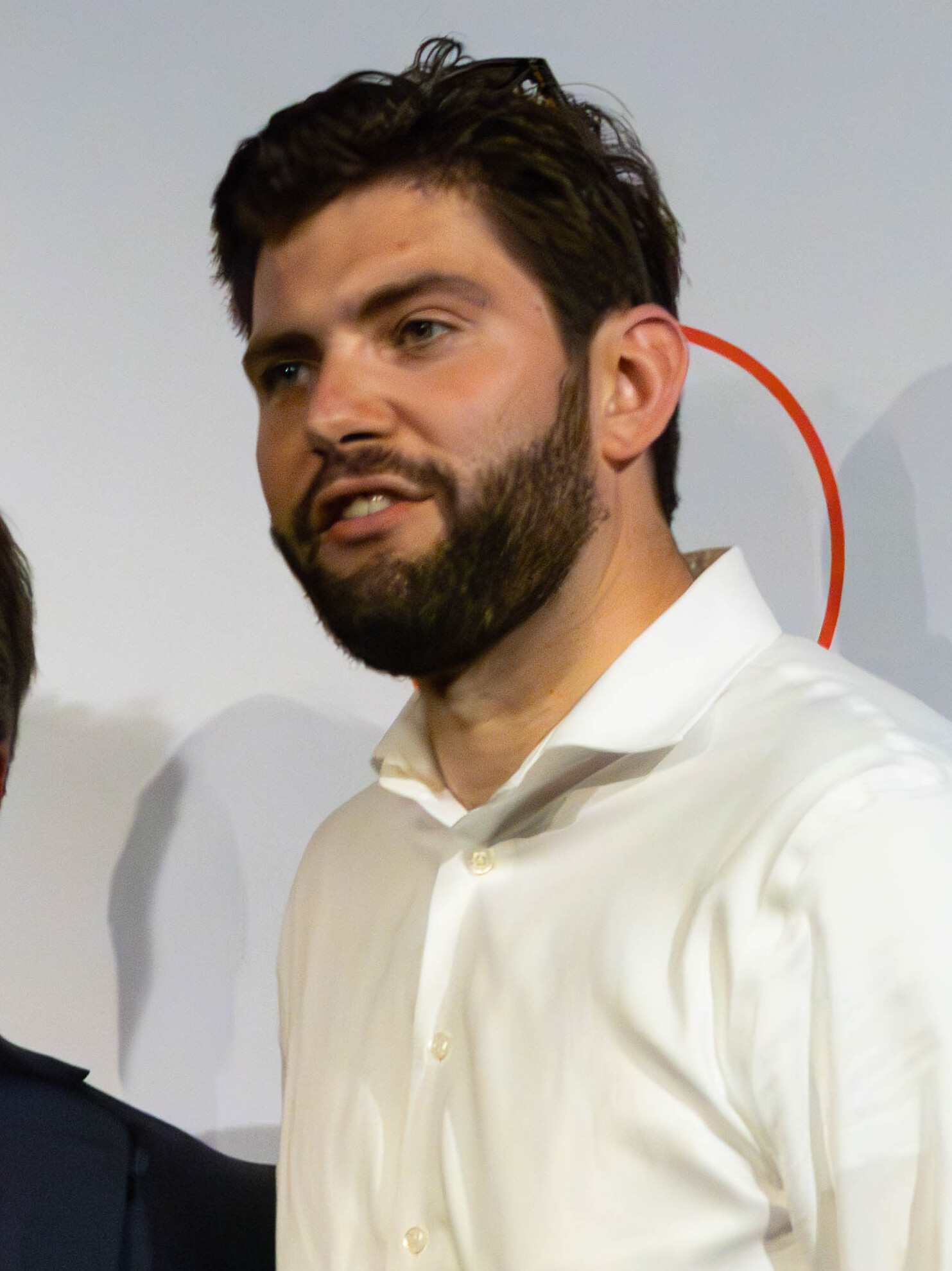
- Hickey in 2024

Minister responsible for the New Brunswick Housing Corporation
- Incumbent
- Assumed office November 2, 2024
- Premier: Susan Holt
- Preceded by: Jill Green

Member of the New Brunswick Legislative Assembly for Saint John Harbour
- Incumbent
- Assumed office October 21, 2024
- Preceded by: Arlene Dunn

Saint John Common Councillor for Ward 3
- In office May 2019 – October 24, 2024 Serving with Gerry Lowe
- Succeeded by: Mariah Darling

Personal details
- Born: May 3, 1995 (age 30) Saint John, New Brunswick
- Party: Liberal

David Hickey MLA (born May 3, 1995) is a Canadian politician, who was elected to the Legislative Assembly of New Brunswick in the 2024 election. He represents the riding of Saint John Harbour. Prior to serving in the legislature, he was a member of the Saint John Common Council from 2019 to 2024.

== Life and career ==
David Hickey was born and raised in Saint John, where he graduated from Saint John High School. He attended the University of New Brunswick where he studied Business and Economics. As a student, Hickey worked for Canadian Members of Parliament (MPs) in the Liberal Party, including British Columbia MPs Hedy Fry and Stephen Fuhr, as well as Saint John—Rothesay MP Wayne Long. In 2018, he was elected National Chair of the Young Liberals of Canada serving for 2 years.

Hickey was elected to the Saint John Common Council in May 2019, where he served as a councilor for Ward 3. He resigned during a council meeting on October 24, 2024, after winning his legislative seat in the 2024 general election. On November 1, 2024, it was announced that he was appointed to cabinet as Minister responsible for the New Brunswick Housing Corporation. Under this ministry, Hickey introduced legislation to implement an annual residential rent cap restriction of three percent on November 20. If passed, it will become effective February 1, 2025.

== Personal life ==
Hickey lives in the Waterloo Village neighbourhood in Saint John.

== Electoral record ==
=== 2024 election ===
2024 New Brunswick general election: Saint John Harbour
Party	Candidate	Votes	%	±%
Liberal	David Hickey	3,413	56.87	+33.6
Progressive Conservative	Adam Smith	1,563	26.05	-16.7
Green	Mariah Darling	715	11.91	-9.6
New Democratic	Kenneth Procter	228	3.80	-2.1
Libertarian	Shelley Craig	82	1.37	
Total valid votes		6,001	99.62	
Total rejected ballots		23	0.38	
Turnout		6,024	50.04	
Eligible voters		12,038		
Liberal gain from Progressive Conservative		Swing		+25.1
Source: Elections New Brunswick
