= Department of Justice and Public Safety (New Brunswick) =

Department of Public Safety

Agency overview
- Jurisdiction: New Brunswick
- Agency executive: Robert Gauvin, Minister of Public Safety and Solicitor General
- Parent department: Government of New Brunswick

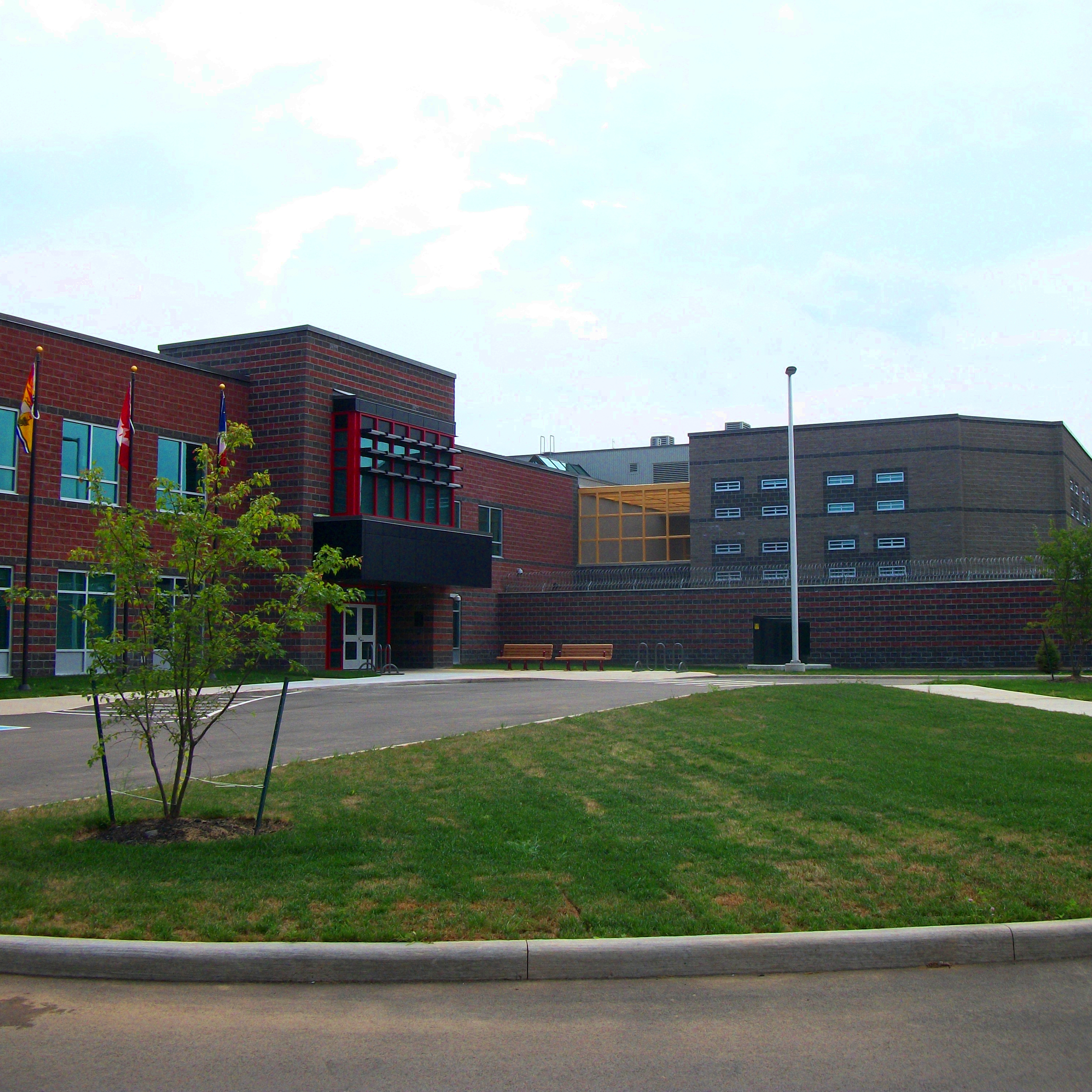
Facilities such as the Southeast Regional Correctional Centre outside Shediac, New Brunswick are administered by the Department of Public Safety.

The Department of Justice and Public Safety in the Canadian province of New Brunswick was formed when Premier Brian Gallant restructured government departments in 2016. It was a merger of all of the former Department of Public Safety with most of the former Department of Justice with the exception of the responsibilities for financial consumer services which transferred from Justice to the Department of Finance. Public Safety had been created in an earlier restructuring project by the Bernard Lord government on March 23, 2000. Largely created from the former Department of the Solicitor General, it also took on responsibilities for road safety and driver's licenses from the Department of Transportation, liquor and lottery regulation from the Department of Finance and safety code monitoring from the Department of Municipalities.

The department is headed by a Minister of Justice and Public Safety who also continues to hold the title of Solicitor General of New Brunswick (French: Ministre de la Sécurité Publique et Solliciteur Général).

It runs the Office of the Provincial Security Adviser and the New Brunswick Emergency Management Organization.

== Ministers ==
| Minister | Term | Administration |
Solicitor General
| Conrad Landry | October 27, 1987 – October 9, 1991 | under Frank McKenna |
| Bruce Smith | October 9, 1991 – April 2, 1994 | under Frank McKenna |
| Jane Barry | April 27, 1994 – October 14, 1997 | under Frank McKenna |
| Jane Barry | October 14, 1997 – May 14, 1998 | under Ray Frenette |
| James E. Lockyer | May 14, 1998 – June 21, 1999 | under Camille Thériault |
| Percy Mockler | June 21, 1999 – March 23, 2000 | under Bernard Lord |
Minister of Public Safety and Solicitor General
| Milt Sherwood | March 23, 2000 – October 9, 2001 | under Bernard Lord |
| Margaret-Ann Blaney | October 9, 2001 – June 27, 2003 | under Bernard Lord |
| Wayne Steeves | June 27, 2003 – October 3, 2006 | under Bernard Lord |
| John Foran | October 3, 2006 - October 12, 2010 | under Shawn Graham |
| Robert Trevors | October 12, 2010 - September 23, 2013 | under David Alward |
| Bruce Northrup | September 23, 2013 – October 7, 2014 | under David Alward |
| Stephen Horsman | October 7, 2014 - June 6, 2016 | under Brian Gallant |
Minister of Justice and Public Safety
| Denis Landry | June 6, 2016 - November 9, 2018 | under Brian Gallant |
Minister of Public Safety
| Carl Urquhart | November 9, 2018 - September 29, 2022 | under Blaine Higgs |
| Ted Flemming | September 29, 2020 - February 23, 2022 | under Blaine Higgs |
| Bill Hogan | February 23, 2022 - October 13, 2022 | under Blaine Higgs |
| Kris Austin | October 13, 2022 - November 2, 2024 | under Blaine Higgs |
| Robert Gauvin | November 2, 2024 - present | under Susan Holt |
