= Cathy Rogers (politician) =

Canadian politician

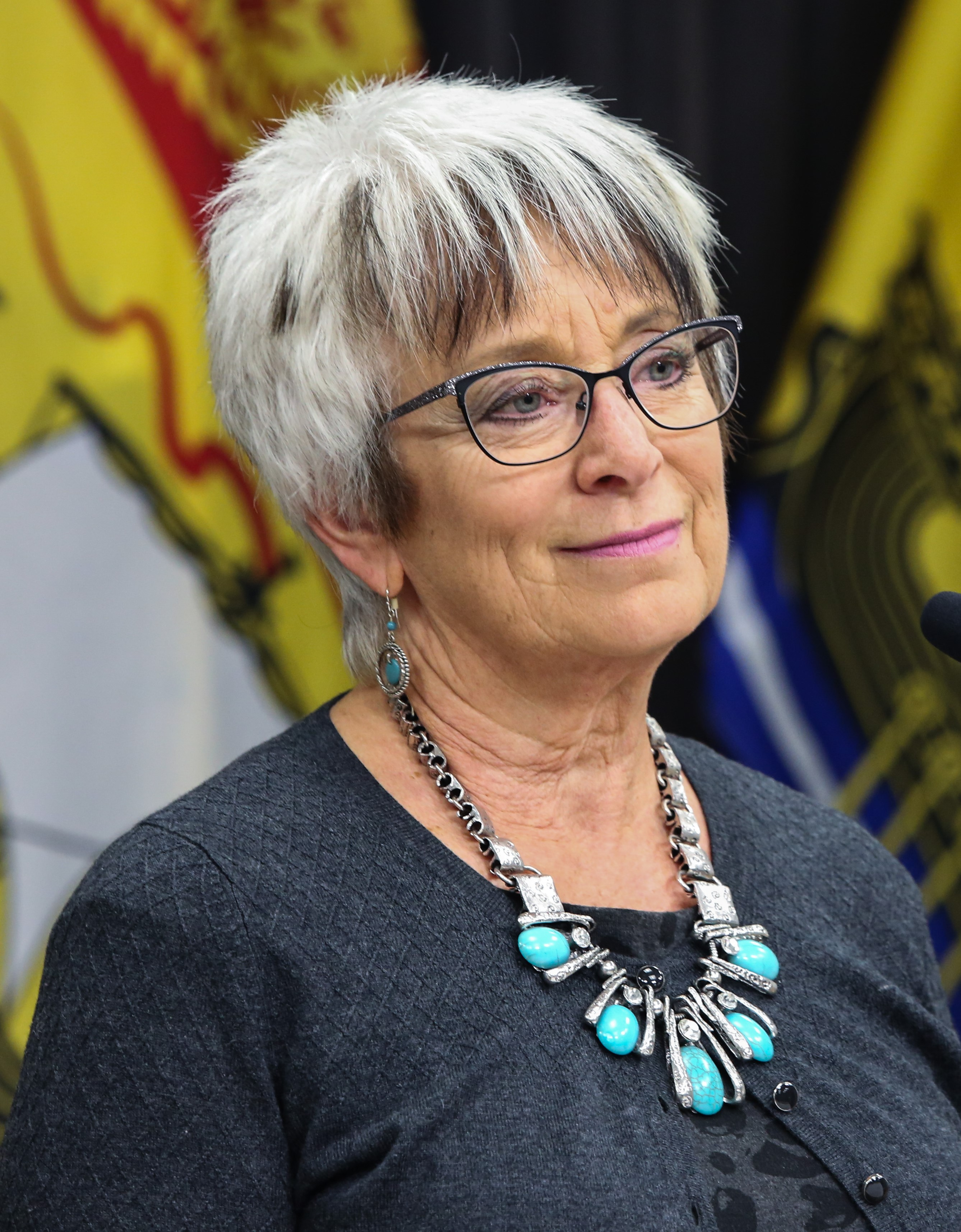
- Rogers in 2018

Minister of Finance
- In office June 6, 2016 – November 8, 2018
- Premier: Brian Gallant
- Preceded by: Roger Melanson
- Succeeded by: Ernie Steeves

Minister of Social Development
- In office October 7, 2014 – June 6, 2016
- Premier: Brian Gallant
- Preceded by: Madeleine Dubé
- Succeeded by: Stephen Horsman (Families and Children); Lisa Harris (Seniors and Long-Term Care)

Minister of Healthy and Inclusive Communities
- In office October 7, 2014 – June 6, 2016
- Premier: Brian Gallant
- Preceded by: Dorothy Shephard
- Succeeded by: John Ames (Tourism, Heritage, and Culture); Stephen Horsman (Families and Children); Lisa Harris (Seniors and Long-Term Care)

Member of the New Brunswick Legislative Assembly for Moncton South
- In office September 22, 2014 – September 14, 2020
- Preceded by: Sue Stultz
- Succeeded by: Greg Turner

Personal details
- Party: Liberal
- Spouse: Daniel Goodwin
- Children: 4

Cathy L. Rogers is a retired Canadian politician who was elected to the Legislative Assembly of New Brunswick in the 2014 provincial election. She represented the electoral district of Moncton South as a member of the Liberal Party. She was New Brunswick's Finance Minister. Rogers stood down at the 2020 general election.

== Electoral results ==
=== 2018 election ===
2018 New Brunswick general election
Party	Candidate	Votes	%	±%
Liberal	Cathy Rogers	3,099	47.44	+2.34
Progressive Conservative	Moira Murphy	2,090	32.00	-2.91
Green	Laura Sanderson	628	9.61	+1.38
People's Alliance	Marilyn Crossman-Riel	466	7.13	--
New Democratic	Amy Johnson	249	3.81	-7.95
Total valid votes		6,532	100.0	
Total rejected ballots		23	0.35	-0.24
Turnout		6,555	58.01	
Eligible voters		11,300		
Liberal hold		Swing		+2.63

=== 2014 Election ===
2014 New Brunswick general election
Party	Candidate	Votes	%	±%
Liberal	Cathy Rogers	2,903	45.10	+12.45
Progressive Conservative	Susan Stultz	2,247	34.91	-13.61
New Democratic	Elisabeth French	757	11.76	+2.38
Green	Rish McGlynn	530	8.23	+0.04
Total valid votes		6,437	100.0	
Total rejected ballots		38	0.59	
Turnout		6,475	55.58	
Eligible voters		11,650		
Liberal notional gain from Progressive Conservative		Swing		+13.03
Source: Elections New Brunswick
