= Moncton South (electoral district) =

Provincial electoral district in New Brunswick, Canada

New Brunswick electoral district
- The riding of Moncton South (as it exists from 2023) in relation to other New Brunswick electoral districts
- Coordinates: 46.088°N 64.792°W

Provincial electoral district
- Legislature: Legislative Assembly of New Brunswick
MLA
Claire Johnson
Liberal
- District created: 1973
- First contested: 1974
- Last contested: 2024

Demographics
- Population (2011): 15,582
- Electors (2013): 11,568
- Census division: Westmorland
- Census subdivision: Moncton

Moncton South (French: Moncton-Sud) is a provincial electoral district for the Legislative Assembly of New Brunswick, Canada. It occupies the southern portion of the city of Moncton.

It was created in 1973 out of the multi-member district of Moncton as Moncton West. It 1994, its boundaries were changed losing much of its northern part to Moncton Crescent while it also expanded to the east and, as a result, its name was changed to Moncton South. In 2006, it lost much of the territory it had gained to the east and was returned to its original name of Moncton West. In 2013 it expanded eastward again, taking in downtown Moncton, and was again renamed Moncton South.

On 17 April 2007, the MLA for the district at the time, Joan MacAlpine-Stiles crossed the floor from the Progressive Conservatives to sit as a Liberal, along with her husband, Wally Stiles, who was the MLA for Petitcodiac.

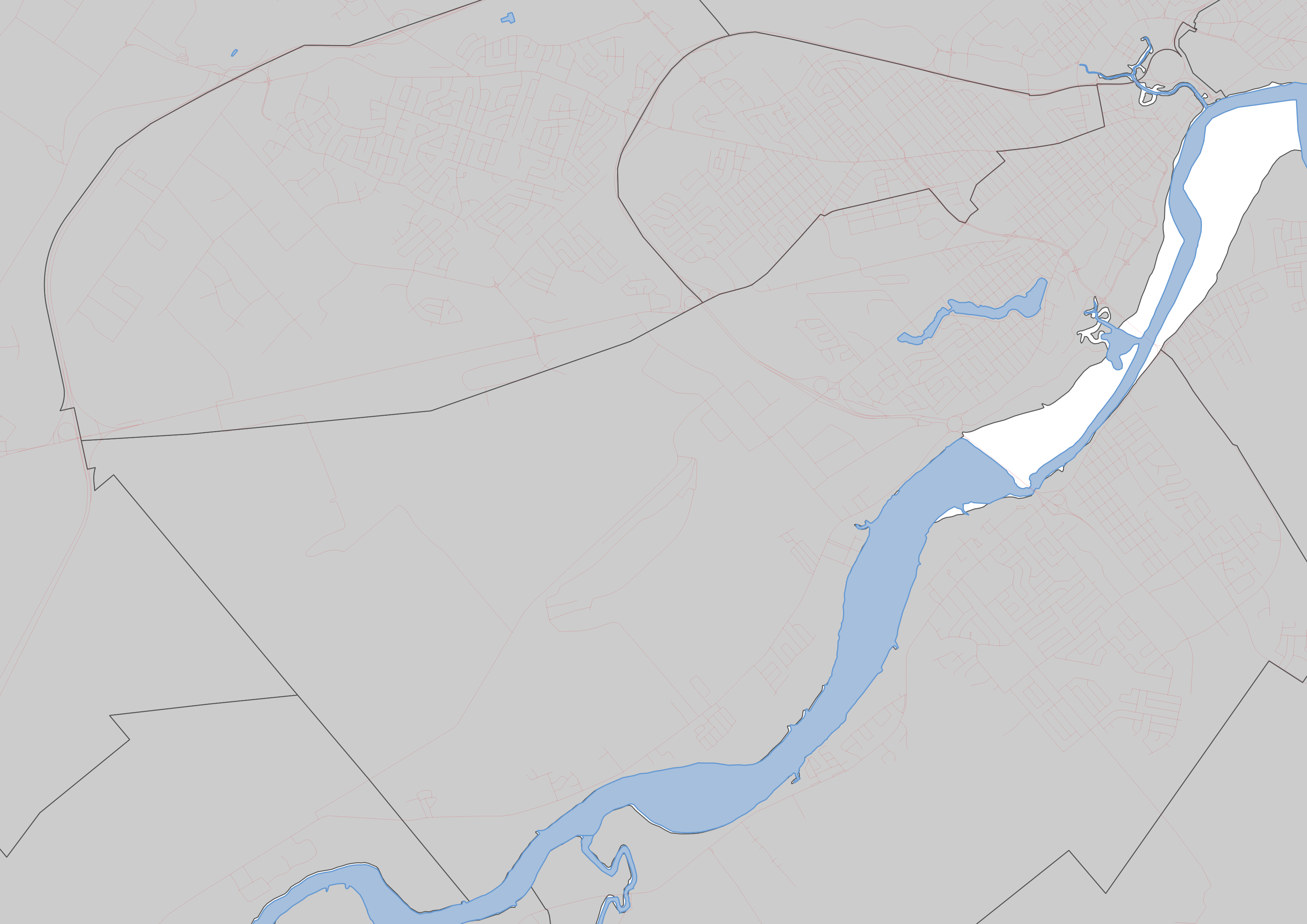
Moncton South (as it exists from 2023) and the roads in the riding

== Members of the Legislative Assembly ==
This riding has elected the following members of the Legislative Assembly:

Assembly	Years	Member	Party
Moncton West; Riding created from Moncton
48th	1974–1978	Paul Creaghan	Progressive Conservative
49th	1978–1982	Mabel DeWare	Progressive Conservative
50th	1982–1987	Mabel DeWare	Progressive Conservative
51st	1987–1991	Jim Lockyer	Liberal
52nd	1991–1995	Jim Lockyer	Liberal
Moncton South
53rd	1995–1999	Jim Lockyer	Liberal
54th	1999–2003	Joan MacAlpine-Stiles	Progressive Conservative
55th	2003–2006	Joan MacAlpine-Stiles	Progressive Conservative
Moncton West
56th	2006–2007	Joan MacAlpine-Stiles	Progressive Conservative
56th	2007–2010	Joan MacAlpine-Stiles	Liberal
57th	2010–2014	Susan Stultz	Progressive Conservative
Moncton South
58th	2014–2018	Cathy Rogers	Liberal
59th	2018–2020	Cathy Rogers	Liberal
60th	2020–2024	Greg Turner	Progressive Conservative
61st	2024–Present	Claire Johnson	Liberal

== Election results ==
=== 2024 ===
2024 New Brunswick general election
** Preliminary results — Not yet official **
Party	Candidate	Votes	%	±%
Liberal	Claire Johnson	3,559	53.21	+26.4
Progressive Conservative	Greg Turner	2,229	33.33	-11.7
Green	Vincent Merola	900	13.46	-4.9
Total valid votes		6,688	99.76	
Total rejected ballots		16	0.24	
Turnout		6,704	59.13	
Eligible voters		11,338		
Liberal gain from Progressive Conservative		Swing		+19.0
Source: Elections New Brunswick

=== 2020 ===
2020 provincial election redistributed results
Party	%
Progressive Conservative	45.0
Liberal	26.8
Green	18.4
People's Alliance	6.3
New Democratic	3.4

2020 New Brunswick general election
Party	Candidate	Votes	%	±%
Progressive Conservative	Greg Turner	2,734	42.09	+10.09
Liberal	Tyson Milner	1,966	30.26	-17.18
Green	Josephine Watson	1,245	19.17	+9.55
People's Alliance	Marilyn Crossman-Riel	331	5.10	-2.04
New Democratic	Rebecca Rogers	220	3.39	-0.43
Total valid votes		6,496	99.78	
Total rejected ballots		14	0.22	-0.14
Turnout		6,510	57.87	-0.14
Eligible voters		11,249		
Progressive Conservative gain from Liberal		Swing		+13.63
Source: Elections New Brunswick

=== 2018 ===
2018 New Brunswick general election
Party	Candidate	Votes	%	±%
Liberal	Cathy Rogers	3,099	47.44	+2.34
Progressive Conservative	Moira Murphy	2,090	32.00	-2.91
Green	Laura Sanderson	628	9.61	+1.38
People's Alliance	Marilyn Crossman-Riel	466	7.13	--
New Democratic	Amy Johnson	249	3.81	-7.95
Total valid votes		6,532	99.65	
Total rejected ballots		23	0.35	-0.24
Turnout		6,555	58.01	
Eligible voters		11,300		
Liberal hold		Swing		+2.63
Source: Elections New Brunswick

=== 2014 ===
2014 New Brunswick general election
Party	Candidate	Votes	%	±%
Liberal	Cathy Rogers	2,903	45.10	+12.45
Progressive Conservative	Susan Stultz	2,247	34.91	-13.61
New Democratic	Elisabeth French	757	11.76	+2.38
Green	Rish McGlynn	530	8.23	+0.04
Total valid votes		6,437	100.0	
Total rejected ballots		38	0.59	
Turnout		6,475	55.58	
Eligible voters		11,650		
Liberal notional gain from Progressive Conservative		Swing		+13.03
Source: Elections New Brunswick

=== 2010 ===
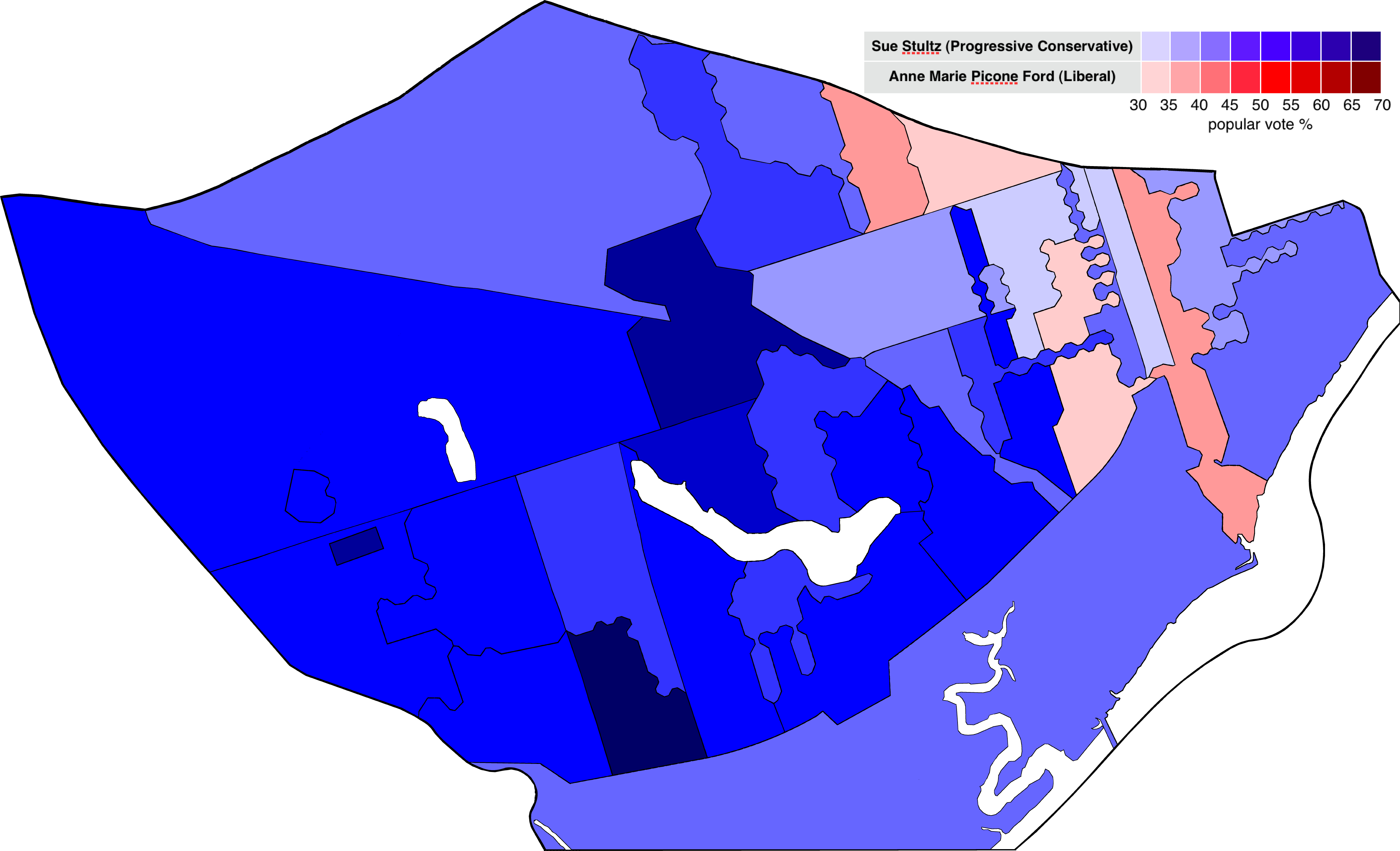
Moncton West's poll-by-poll winners for the 2010 New Brunswick election

2010 New Brunswick general election: Moncton West
Party	Candidate	Votes	%	±%	Expenditures
Progressive Conservative	Sue Stultz	2,981	48.52	−3.89	$27,212
Liberal	Anne Marie Picone Ford	2,006	32.65	−14.94	not filed
New Democratic	Shawna Gagné	576	9.38	–	$4,117
Green	Mathieu Laplante	503	8.19	–	$1,138
Independent	Barry Renouf	78	1.27	–	not filed
Total valid votes/expense limit		6,144	100.0		$31,712
Total rejected ballots		36	0.36		
Turnout		6,180	61.54	+1.78	
Eligible voters		10,043			
Progressive Conservative hold		Swing		+5.53	
Source: Elections New Brunswick

=== 2006 ===
2006 New Brunswick general election
Party	Candidate	Votes	%	±%	Expenditures
Progressive Conservative	Joan MacAlpine-Stiles	3,317	52.40	+4.69	$23,231
Liberal	Gene Joseph Devereaux	3,013	47.60	+6.46	$15,604
Total valid votes/expense limit		6,330	100.0		$30,367
Total rejected ballots		61	0.54		
Turnout		6,391	56.96	+1.00	
Eligible voters		11,221			
Progressive Conservative hold		Swing		-0.89	
Source: Elections New Brunswick

=== 2003 ===
2003 New Brunswick general election
Party	Candidate	Votes	%	±%	Expenditures
Progressive Conservative	Joan MacAlpine	3,143	47.71	-6.20	$21,525
Liberal	Norman Branch	2,710	41.14	+4.56	$14,473
New Democratic	Stéphane Drysdale	437	6.63	-2.87	$0
Independent	John Gallant	226	3.43	–	not filed
Grey Party	Jean-Marc "Diggit" Dugas	72	1.09	–	not filed
Total valid votes/expense limit		6,588	100.0		$30,801
Total rejected ballots		41	0.35		
Turnout		6,629	55.96	-11.57	
Eligible voters		11,847			
Progressive Conservative hold		Swing		-5.38	
Source: Elections New Brunswick

=== 1999 ===
1999 New Brunswick general election
Party	Candidate	Votes	%	±%	Expenditures
Progressive Conservative	Joan MacAlpine	3,898	53.91	+36.27	$19,681
Liberal	Jim Lockyer	2,645	36.58	-25.25	$17,326
New Democratic	Teresa Sullivan	687	9.50	+1.26	$2,650
Total valid votes/expense limit		7,230	100.0		$24,708
Total rejected ballots		22	0.20		
Turnout		7,252	67.53	+4.81	
Eligible voters		10,739			
Progressive Conservative gain from Liberal		Swing		+30.76	
Source: Elections New Brunswick

=== 1995 ===
1995 New Brunswick general election
Party	Candidate	Votes	%	±%	Expenditures
Liberal	Jim Lockyer	4,332	61.83	+14.12	$16,265
Progressive Conservative	Bob MacKenzie Leighton	1,236	17.64	-2.24	$8,835
Confederation of Regions	Don Freeman	861	12.29	-10.38	$854
New Democratic	Blair McInnis	577	8.24	-1.49	$5,017
Total valid votes/expense limit		7,006	100.0		$24,966
Total rejected ballots		26	0.23		
Turnout		7,032	62.72	-12.89	
Eligible voters		11,212			
Liberal hold		Swing		+9.58	

=== 1991 ===
1991 New Brunswick general election
Party	Candidate	Votes	%	±%	Expenditures
Liberal	Jim Lockyer	3,558	47.71	-16.53	$16,802
Confederation of Regions	Ben Stymiest	1,691	22.67	–	$6,235
Progressive Conservative	Arthur Hayden	1,483	19.88	-5.48	$3,059
New Democratic	Stephanie Day Domingue	726	9.73	-0.67	
Total valid votes/expense limit		7,458	100.0		$20,070
Total rejected ballots		40	0.41		
Turnout		7,498	76.40	-0.36	
Eligible voters		9,814			
Liberal hold		Swing		-6.92	

=== 1987 ===
1987 New Brunswick general election
Party	Candidate	Votes	%	±%	Expenditures
Liberal	Jim Lockyer	4,853	64.24	+26.85	$14,787
Progressive Conservative	Mabel DeWare	1,916	25.36	-29.48	$13,295
New Democratic	David Lang	786	10.40	+2.63	$1,808
Total valid votes/expense limit		7,555	100.0		$16,476
Total rejected ballots		47	0.47		
Turnout		7,602	76.76	-2.13	
Eligible voters		9,904			
Liberal gain from Progressive Conservative		Swing		+28.17	
Source: Elections New Brunswick

=== 1982 ===
1982 New Brunswick general election
Party	Candidate	Votes	%	±%	Expenditures
Progressive Conservative	Mabel DeWare	4,242	54.84	-3.07	$12,653
Liberal	Wayne Patterson	2,892	37.39	-1.54	$10.199
New Democratic	Brian Harvey	601	7.77	–	$1,096
Total valid votes/expense limit		7,735	100.0		$14,513
Total rejected ballots		60	0.61		
Turnout		7,795	78.89	+5.45	
Eligible voters		9,881			
Progressive Conservative hold		Swing		-0.77	
Source: Elections New Brunswick

=== 1978 ===
1978 New Brunswick general election
Party	Candidate	Votes	%	±%	Expenditures
Progressive Conservative	Mabel DeWare	4,211	57.91	+5.52	$7,358
Liberal	Donald A. Canning	2,831	38.93	-8.68	$8,481
Parti acadien	Paul Hebert	230	3.16	–	$0
Total valid votes/expense limit		7,272	100.0		$14,856
Total rejected ballots		84	0.84		
Turnout		7,356	73.44	+0.95	
Eligible voters		10,017			
Progressive Conservative hold		Swing		+7.10	
Source: Elections New Brunswick

=== 1974 ===
1974 New Brunswick general election
Party	Candidate	Votes	%
Progressive Conservative	Paul Creaghan	3,961	52.39
Liberal	Stuart G. Stratton	3,599	47.61
Total valid votes		7,560	100.0
Total rejected ballots		91	0.86
Turnout		7,651	72.49
Eligible voters		10,554	
This was a new district created out of Moncton which went totally Progressive Conservative in the previous election, with Paul Creaghan being one of three incumbents.
Source: Elections New Brunswick

== See also ==
- List of New Brunswick provincial electoral districts
- Canadian provincial electoral districts
