= Steven Porter (Canadian politician) =

Canadian politician

P. Steven Porter

MLA for Carleton South
- In office 1978–1987
- Preceded by: Edison Stairs
- Succeeded by: Bruce Atherton Smith

Personal details
- Born: September 30, 1945 (age 80) Woodstock, New Brunswick
- Party: Progressive Conservative Party of New Brunswick

Paul Steven Porter (born September 30, 1945) was a Canadian politician. He served in the Legislative Assembly of New Brunswick from 1978 to 1987, as a Progressive Conservative member for the constituency of Carleton South.
