= Bruce Atherton Smith =

Canadian journalist and politician

Bruce Atherton Smith (May 3, 1937 – November 24, 2006) was a journalist and politician in the province of New Brunswick, Canada.

In 1959, Smith graduated from Radio and Television Arts program at the Ryerson Institute of Technology in Toronto, Ontario. He moved to New Brunswick where he worked as a radio broadcaster and was News Director and General Manager of radio station CJCJ in the town of Woodstock.

Smith entered provincial politics as a Liberal candidate and was elected to the Legislative Assembly of New Brunswick in the 1987, 1991 and 1995. He did not seek re-election in 1999.

He served in the cabinet first as Minister of Supply and Services from 1987 to 1991 and then as Solicitor General of New Brunswick from 1991 to 1994 when he was removed in a cabinet shuffle. After the 1995 election, he returned to his previous Supply & Services post until 1997 when he was again removed from cabinet during a shuffle.

Smith died on November 24, 2006, at the age of 69 due to complications from diabetes at the Carleton Memorial Hospital in Woodstock. A funeral was held on November 28, 2006, at the Saint Luke's Anglican Church in Woodstock.

== Sources ==
- Premier's message on death of Bruce Smith
- CBC riding profile

New Brunswick provincial government of Frank McKenna
Cabinet posts (3)
Predecessor	Office	Successor
James E. Lockyer	Minister of Supply and Services; 1995–1997	Peter LeBlanc
Conrad Landry	Solicitor General of New Brunswick; 1991–1994	Jane Barry
C. W. Harmer	Minister of Supply and Services; 1987–1991	Laureen Jarrett
Other offices
Preceded by new district	MLA for Woodstock; 1995–1999	Succeeded by David Alward (Progressive Conservative)
Preceded by Steven Porter (Progressive Conservative)	MLA for Carleton South; 1987–1995	Succeeded by district abolished
