= Office of the Provincial Security Adviser =

Agency overview
- Jurisdiction: Government of New Brunswick

The Office of the Provincial Security Adviser (OPSA) is an agency of the Government of New Brunswick, Canada which operates under the Department of Justice and Public Safety.

Its mission is described as "providing security advice....networks, facilities, assets and persons critical to New Brunswick's safety, security and economy in both the public and private sectors...for natural, accidental and deliberate events".

It came to public attention in 2026 when it was revealed to have been reported to the Ombudsman by the head of the RCMP in the province for potentially violating the law in surveilling specific residents of New Brunswick in response to the COVID-19 lockdowns. This included monitoring the travel of residents, through their cellphone data - and monitoring online activity of “citizens who express discontent” toward government policies.

The CBC reported "It’s not clear when the office was created, but it has existed for at least a decade with no legislation setting out what it can and can’t do.". In 2016, Andrew Easton, head of Ambulance New Brunswick, was named its head - a role he continued through 2022.

== Activities ==
In November 2020, the OPSA sent a broad memo to NB's police forces, fire departments, ambulance and 9-1-1 services and "owners of critical infrastructure", to warn them to teach their employees to avoid phishing emails, in response to a 2020 ransomware attack in New Brunswick.

In January 2021, the OPSA issued advice to government employees to refer any "phone calls of concern" to their office for investigation which "may include swearing, yelling, ranting or making threats". In 2026, the Minister of Public Safety Robert Gauvin reiterated "“If I get an email or a bad voice message, they look at it...if they deem it’s a threat, they send it to the proper agencies.".
