= 1963 Diamond D Championship =

Canadian women's curling championship

1963 Diamond "D" Championship
- Host city: Saint John, New Brunswick
- Arena: St. Andrew's Curling Club
- Dates: February 25–28
- Winner: New Brunswick
- Curling club: Beaver CC, Moncton
- Skip: Mabel DeWare
- Third: Harriet Stratton
- Second: Forbis Stevenson
- Lead: Marjorie Fraser

The 1963 Diamond "D" Championship the Canadian women's curling championship was held from February 25 to 28, 1963 at the St. Andrew's Curling Club in Saint John, New Brunswick.

Team New Brunswick, who was skipped by Mabel DeWare won the event by finishing the round robin with an 8-1 record. This was New Brunswick's first championship. As of 2024, DeWare's rink is the only New Brunswick rink has won a Canadian women's curling championship. This was also the first time in which a team won the championship on their home soil.

British Columbia and Ontario finished tied for second with 7-2 records, necessitating a tiebreaker between the two teams to determine the runner-up. British Columbia won runner-up as they defeated Ontario 6-4. This was also the first tiebreaker that was scheduled for 10 ends as the previous tiebreakers in 1961 were scheduled for 12 ends.

== Teams ==
The teams are listed as follows:

Alberta	British Columbia	Manitoba	New Brunswick	Newfoundland
Calgary WC, Calgary Skip: Vera Reed; Third: Bernie McKenzie; Second: Phyllis Crist; Lead: Irene Halverson	Kimberley CC, Kimberley Skip: Ina Hansen; Third: Ada Calles; Second: Isabel Leith; Lead: May Shaw	Bethany CC, Bethany Skip: Irene Burton; Third: Marjorie Parrott; Second: Evelyn Boyd; Lead: Margaret Storey	Beaver CC, Moncton Skip: Mabel DeWare; Third: Harriet Stratton; Second: Forbis Stevenson; Lead: Marjorie Fraser	Grand Falls CC, Grand Falls Skip: Violet Pike; Third: Margaret Ryan; Second: Joan Baker; Lead: Ruby Tittemore
Nova Scotia	Ontario	Prince Edward Island	Quebec	Saskatchewan
Mayflower CC, Halifax Skip: Shirley Robertson; Third: Marlene Mullenger; Second: Ada Matheson; Lead: Molly Nelson	Granite CC, Toronto Skip: Emily Woolley; Third: Dadie Smith; Second: Jane Clark; Lead: Mary Mills	RCAF Summerside CC, Summerside Skip: Fern Seel; Third: Bernice Cook; Second: Kay Hoare; Lead: Elsie Farquhar	Royal Montreal CC, Montreal Skip: Inez Kerr; Third: Phyllis Campbell; Second: Grace Pratt; Lead: Mary Gordon	Moose Jaw CC, Moose Jaw Skip: Mildred Binner; Third: Velma Starrak; Second: Peggy Johnson; Lead: Jean Balderston

== Map of teams ==
Provincial Winners

== Round robin standings ==
Key
Diamond D champion
Teams to Tiebreaker

Province	Skip	W	L	PF	PA
New Brunswick	Mabel DeWare	8	1	102	52
British Columbia	Ina Hansen	7	2	90	47
Ontario	Emily Wooley	7	2	94	49
Alberta	Vera Reed	6	3	79	58
Quebec	Inez Kerr	4	5	76	85
Nova Scotia	Shirley Robertson	4	5	68	75
Saskatchewan	Mildred Binner	4	5	64	78
Prince Edward Island	Fern Seel	3	6	65	98
Newfoundland	Violet Pike	1	8	50	94
Manitoba	Irene Burton	1	8	44	96

== Round robin results ==
=== Draw 1 ===
Monday, February 25

Team	1	2	3	4	5	6	7	8	9	10	Final
Prince Edward Island (Seel)	0	0	2	0	0	0	0	0	0	X	2
New Brunswick (DeWare)	3	1	0	2	2	1	1	2	2	X	14

Team	1	2	3	4	5	6	7	8	9	10	Final
Saskatchewan (Binner)	1	0	0	1	0	0	4	0	1	0	7
Ontario (Wooley)	0	1	1	0	1	1	0	1	0	1	6

Team	1	2	3	4	5	6	7	8	9	10	Final
Alberta (Reed)	2	1	2	0	1	3	1	0	0	0	10
Quebec (Kerr)	0	0	0	1	0	0	0	1	1	0	3

Team	1	2	3	4	5	6	7	8	9	10	Final
Manitoba (Burton)	0	1	0	0	0	2	0	0	1	0	4
Nova Scotia (Robertson)	2	0	2	2	1	0	1	3	0	1	12

Team	1	2	3	4	5	6	7	8	9	10	Final
Newfoundland (Pike)	1	0	0	0	3	0	1	0	1	0	6
British Columbia (Hansen)	0	1	4	2	0	2	0	3	0	1	13

=== Draw 2 ===
Monday, February 25

Team	1	2	3	4	5	6	7	8	9	10	Final
Nova Scotia (Robinson)	0	0	0	1	0	1	0	1	1	0	4
Alberta (Reed)	1	0	3	0	1	0	4	0	0	1	10

Team	1	2	3	4	5	6	7	8	9	10	Final
Prince Edward Island (Seel)	0	2	0	2	1	0	0	0	0	X	5
British Columbia (Hansen)	1	0	4	0	0	3	3	1	1	X	13

Team	1	2	3	4	5	6	7	8	9	10	Final
Newfoundland (Pike)	1	1	0	0	3	0	1	0	0	2	8
Manitoba (Burton)	0	0	2	1	0	1	0	1	1	0	6

Team	1	2	3	4	5	6	7	8	9	10	Final
Quebec (Kerr)	1	1	0	3	2	0	2	0	0	1	10
Saskatchewan (Binner)	0	0	3	0	0	1	0	2	2	0	8

Team	1	2	3	4	5	6	7	8	9	10	11	Final
New Brunswick (DeWare)	4	1	0	3	0	1	0	3	0	1	0	13
Ontario (Wooley)	0	0	1	0	6	0	3	0	3	0	1	14

=== Draw 3 ===
Tuesday, February 26

Team	1	2	3	4	5	6	7	8	9	10	Final
Saskatchewan (Binner)	2	0	4	0	1	0	3	0	1	1	12
Newfoundland (Pike)	0	1	0	1	0	1	0	1	0	0	4

Team	1	2	3	4	5	6	7	8	9	10	Final
New Brunswick (DeWare)	2	0	1	4	3	1	0	3	0	X	14
Quebec (Kerr)	0	2	0	0	0	0	4	0	1	X	7

Team	1	2	3	4	5	6	7	8	9	10	Final
Ontario (Wooley)	3	1	2	0	1	0	1	1	3	X	12
Nova Scotia (Robinson)	0	0	0	1	0	1	0	0	0	X	2

Team	1	2	3	4	5	6	7	8	9	10	Final
British Columbia (Hansen)	2	1	1	1	0	0	4	0	1	0	10
Alberta (Reed)	0	0	0	0	0	2	0	1	0	1	4

Team	1	2	3	4	5	6	7	8	9	10	Final
Manitoba (Burton)	2	1	0	1	0	1	0	3	1	2	11
Prince Edward Island (Seel)	0	0	3	0	2	0	2	0	0	0	7

=== Draw 4 ===
Tuesday, February 26

Team	1	2	3	4	5	6	7	8	9	10	Final
Quebec (Kerr)	4	1	0	4	1	0	1	0	1	X	12
Manitoba (Burton)	0	0	1	0	0	1	0	3	0	X	5

Team	1	2	3	4	5	6	7	8	9	10	Final
Newfoundland (Pike)	1	0	0	0	1	0	0	2	0	X	4
Ontario (Wooley)	0	2	1	3	0	0	3	0	3	X	12

Team	1	2	3	4	5	6	7	8	9	10	Final
New Brunswick (DeWare)	0	0	1	2	3	0	3	0	0	0	9
British Columbia (Hansen)	1	2	0	0	0	1	0	0	1	1	6

Team	1	2	3	4	5	6	7	8	9	10	Final
Prince Edward Island (Seel)	4	1	0	1	0	0	0	0	0	X	6
Nova Scotia (Robinson)	0	0	2	0	4	1	2	3	2	X	14

Team	1	2	3	4	5	6	7	8	9	10	Final
Alberta (Reed)	0	3	0	1	3	0	2	0	1	0	10
Saskatchewan (Binner)	0	0	3	0	0	2	0	1	0	1	7

=== Draw 5 ===
Tuesday, February 26

Team	1	2	3	4	5	6	7	8	9	10	Final
Ontario (Wooley)	0	3	0	1	1	0	1	0	1	X	7
Alberta (Reed)	1	0	2	0	0	3	0	3	0	X	9

Team	1	2	3	4	5	6	7	8	9	10	Final
British Columbia (Hansen)	3	3	4	2	1	1	1	1	X	X	16
Manitoba (Burton)	0	0	0	0	0	0	0	0	X	X	0

Team	1	2	3	4	5	6	7	8	9	10	Final
Saskatchewan (Binner)	0	2	0	2	6	1	0	0	0	1	12
Prince Edward Island (Seel)	1	0	3	0	0	0	2	3	2	0	11

Team	1	2	3	4	5	6	7	8	9	10	Final
Newfoundland (Pike)	0	0	0	0	1	1	1	0	1	X	4
New Brunswick (DeWare)	1	1	1	4	0	0	0	3	0	X	10

Team	1	2	3	4	5	6	7	8	9	10	11	Final
Nova Scotia (Robinson)	2	2	1	0	1	0	0	0	3	1	0	10
Quebec (Kerr)	0	0	0	1	0	7	1	1	0	0	3	13

=== Draw 6 ===
Wednesday, February 27

Team	1	2	3	4	5	6	7	8	9	10	Final
Manitoba (Burton)	0	0	0	0	0	1	0	0	0	X	1
Ontario (Wooley)	2	1	2	1	1	0	3	2	1	X	13

Team	1	2	3	4	5	6	7	8	9	10	Final
New Brunswick (DeWare)	0	1	0	0	1	0	1	0	5	X	8
Alberta (Reed)	1	0	1	1	0	1	0	1	0	X	5

Team	1	2	3	4	5	6	7	8	9	10	Final
Saskatchewan (Binner)	0	0	2	0	0	0	1	0	0	0	3
British Columbia (Hansen)	0	1	0	0	1	2	0	2	1	0	7

Team	1	2	3	4	5	6	7	8	9	10	Final
Prince Edward Island (Seel)	0	0	0	2	0	3	0	3	0	2	10
Quebec (Kerr)	3	1	1	0	1	0	1	0	2	0	9

Team	1	2	3	4	5	6	7	8	9	10	Final
Newfoundland (Pike)	2	0	0	1	0	0	2	0	0	X	5
Nova Scotia (Robinson)	0	1	1	0	2	2	0	1	1	X	8

=== Draw 7 ===
Wednesday, February 27

Team	1	2	3	4	5	6	7	8	9	10	Final
Ontario (Wooley)	0	3	1	0	0	3	2	0	0	X	9
British Columbia (Hansen)	1	0	0	1	0	0	0	2	1	X	5

Team	1	2	3	4	5	6	7	8	9	10	Final
Alberta (Reed)	1	0	0	1	0	2	0	0	1	X	5
Prince Edward Island (Seel)	0	1	2	0	4	0	4	1	0	X	12

Team	1	2	3	4	5	6	7	8	9	10	Final
Manitoba (Burton)	3	0	0	1	0	0	0	1	0	1	6
Saskatchewan (Binner)	0	1	1	0	2	1	1	0	1	0	7

Team	1	2	3	4	5	6	7	8	9	10	Final
Nova Scotia (Robinson)	1	0	0	2	0	1	0	1	1	X	6
New Brunswick (DeWare)	0	1	3	0	3	0	3	0	0	X	10

Team	1	2	3	4	5	6	7	8	9	10	11	Final
Quebec (Kerr)	2	0	1	0	0	2	0	1	3	0	1	10
Newfoundland (Pike)	0	1	0	2	1	0	4	0	0	1	0	9

=== Draw 8 ===
Thursday, February 28

Team	1	2	3	4	5	6	7	8	9	10	Final
Alberta (Reed)	3	3	0	2	0	4	1	0	1	X	14
Newfoundland (Pike)	0	0	1	0	1	0	0	1	0	X	3

Team	1	2	3	4	5	6	7	8	9	10	Final
Saskatchewan (Binner)	1	0	1	0	1	0	3	0	1	0	7
Nova Scotia (Robinson)	0	1	0	4	0	1	0	1	0	1	8

Team	1	2	3	4	5	6	7	8	9	10	Final
British Columbia (Hansen)	0	2	0	3	0	3	0	2	2	X	12
Quebec (Kerr)	2	0	1	0	1	0	3	0	0	X	7

Team	1	2	3	4	5	6	7	8	9	10	Final
Prince Edward Island (Seel)	2	0	0	0	0	0	0	0	1	X	3
Ontario (Wooley)	0	1	2	2	2	1	3	3	0	X	14

Team	1	2	3	4	5	6	7	8	9	10	Final
New Brunswick (DeWare)	0	3	0	1	0	0	1	1	2	1	9
Manitoba (Burton)	2	0	1	0	3	1	0	0	0	0	7

=== Draw 9 ===
Thursday, February 28

Team	1	2	3	4	5	6	7	8	9	10	Final
New Brunswick (DeWare)	2	1	0	1	1	1	4	4	1	X	15
Saskatchewan (Binner)	0	0	1	0	0	0	0	0	0	X	1

Team	1	2	3	4	5	6	7	8	9	10	Final
Nova Scotia (Robinson)	0	0	0	3	0	1	0	0	0	0	4
British Columbia (Hansen)	0	0	2	0	1	0	1	2	1	1	8

Team	1	2	3	4	5	6	7	8	9	10	Final
Manitoba (Burton)	0	0	0	0	1	2	1	0	0	X	4
Alberta (Reed)	2	2	1	1	0	0	0	4	2	X	12

Team	1	2	3	4	5	6	7	8	9	10	Final
Newfoundland (Pike)	0	1	0	0	1	0	2	0	2	X	6
Prince Edward Island (Seel)	1	0	2	1	0	1	0	4	0	X	9

Team	1	2	3	4	5	6	7	8	9	10	Final
Ontario (Wooley)	0	0	1	0	3	0	1	1	0	1	7
Quebec (Kerr)	1	0	0	1	0	2	0	0	1	0	5

== Tiebreaker ==
Friday, March 1

Team	1	2	3	4	5	6	7	8	9	10	Final
British Columbia (Hansen)	0	0	2	1	1	1	0	1	0	X	6
Ontario (Wooley)	1	0	0	0	0	0	1	0	2	X	4

== Records ==
This event set or tied several scoring records of which have either been tied or still stand as of 2023.

- Ontario's 14-13 victory over eventual champion New Brunswick in Draw 2 set the record the most combined points scored between two teams in a single game (27). This record was later tied in 1967 and still has not been surpassed since.
- Draw 5 saw the following records set or tied:
  - British Columbia's 16-0 win over Manitoba was the first time that a team scored a shutout in the Canadian women's championship. To date, the 16 points scored by British Columbia is the most points ever scored by a winning team in a shutout.
  - Saskatchewan's steal of 6 points in the fifth end tied the record for most stolen points scored in a single end. This also occurred in 1961 and has been matched four other times since (most recently in 2019).
  - Quebec's 7 points in the sixth end against Nova Scotia set the record for most points scored in a single end. This record has since been matched three times (1972, 2020, and 2023).
