= Mabel DeWare =

Canadian politician (1926–2022)

The Honourable Mabel DeWare

Member of the Legislative Assembly of New Brunswick for Moncton West
- In office October 23, 1978 – October 13, 1987
- Preceded by: Paul Creaghan
- Succeeded by: Jim Lockyer

Member of the Senate of Canada
- In office 23 September 1990 – 9 August 2001
- Appointed by: Brian Mulroney
- Constituency: New Brunswick

Personal details
- Born: Mabel Margaret Keiver; 9 August 1926 Moncton, New Brunswick, Canada
- Died: 17 August 2022 (aged 96) Moncton, New Brunswick, Canada
- Party: Progressive Conservative
- Spouse: Ralph DeWare (m. 1945–2005)
- Children: 4
- Occupation: Politician; curler

Mabel Margaret DeWare (née Keiver; 9 August 1926 – 17 August 2022) was a Canadian politician, senator, and curler.

DeWare was born in Moncton, New Brunswick, to parents Mary and Hugh Keiver.

She skipped her team to a New Brunswick and Canadian Curling Association Ladies Curling championship in 1963, forerunner to the Scotties Tournament of Hearts.

In 1978, she was elected to the Legislative Assembly of New Brunswick as a member of the Progressive Conservative Party of New Brunswick. She was re-elected in 1982 and was defeated in 1987. She held three cabinet positions: Minister of Labour and Manpower (1978–1982), Minister of Community Colleges (1983–1985), and Minister of Advanced Education (1985–1987).

In 1990, she was appointed to the Senate of Canada representing the senatorial division of Moncton, New Brunswick. A Progressive Conservative, she was the Opposition Whip in the Senate from 1999 to 2001. She retired on her 75th birthday.

She was inducted in the New Brunswick Sports Hall of Fame in 1976 and the Canadian Curling Hall of Fame as curler/builder in 1987.

DeWare died in Moncton on 17 August 2022, eight days after turning 96.

== Electoral results ==
=== 1987 election ===
1987 New Brunswick election: Moncton West
Party	Candidate	Votes	%	±	Expenditures
Liberal	Jim Lockyer	4853	64.24	+26.85	$14,787
Progressive Conservative	Mabel DeWare	1916	25.36	-29.48	$13,295
New Democratic	David Lang	786	10.40	+2.63	$1,808
Total valid votes/expense limit		7555	100.00	$16,476	
Total rejected ballots		47	0.47		
Turnout		7602	76.76	-2.13	
Electors on list		9904			
Liberal gain from Progressive Conservative		Swing	+28.17		

=== 1982 election ===
1982 New Brunswick election: Moncton West
Party	Candidate	Votes	%	±	Expenditures
Progressive Conservative	Mabel DeWare	4242	54.84	-3.07	$12,653
Liberal	Wayne Patterson	2892	37.39	-1.54	$10,199
New Democratic	Brian Harvey	601	7.77	*	$1,096
Total valid votes/expense limit		7735	100.00	$14,513	
Total rejected ballots		60	0.61		
Turnout		7795	78.89	+5.45	
Electors on list		9881			
Progressive Conservative hold		Swing	-0.77		

=== 1978 election ===
1978 New Brunswick election: Moncton West
Party	Candidate	Votes	%	±	Expenditures
Progressive Conservative	Mabel DeWare	4211	57.91	+5.52	$7,358
Liberal	Donald A. Canning	2831	38.93	-8.68	$8,481
Parti acadien	Paul Hebert	230	3.16	*	$0
Total valid votes/expense limit		7272	100.00	$14,856	
Total rejected ballots		84	0.84		
Turnout		7356	73.44	+0.95	
Electors on list		10,017			
Progressive Conservative hold		Swing	+7.10		

== General references ==
- "Mabel DeWare Rink". Archived from the original on 28 September 2007.
- "Canadian Who's Who 1997 entry".
- "Elections NB – Publications". Archived from the original on 15 October 2006.
