= A. Edison Stairs =

Canadian businessman and politician

- Born: December 22, 1924; Meductic, New Brunswick, Canada
- Died: October 10, 2010 (aged 85)
- Education: University of New Brunswick
- Occupations: Businessman, politician
- Political party: Progressive Conservative

Allen Edison Stairs (December 22, 1924 – October 10, 2010) was a Canadian businessman and politician. Known by Edison, after graduating high school he attended the University of New Brunswick but interrupted his education during World War II to join the Royal Canadian Air Force. He served until after V-E Day in 1945 and following his discharge from the military settled in Woodstock, New Brunswick where he established an insurance business.

From a family active in community affairs, his great-uncle Ernest W. Stairs had been a member of the Legislative Assembly of New Brunswick from 1935 to 1939. Edison Stairs was elected as the Progressive Conservative Party member for Carleton in 1960, 1963, and 1967, sitting as a member of the Official Opposition. Reelected in 1970, his party formed the government led by Premier Richard Hatfield, and Stairs was immediately named to the Cabinet. He held several positions until 1976 when, as Minister of Finance and Chairman of NB Power, he resigned from Cabinet to be with his terminally ill wife. Stairs remained a member of the Legislature until 1978 but retired from politics upon the passing of his wife.

His cousin, Gerald Merrithew, was elected both provincially (1972–1984) and federally (1984–1993).

New Brunswick provincial government of Richard Hatfield
Cabinet posts (4)
Predecessor	Office	Successor
Jean-Maurice Simard	'Minister of Finance'; 1974–1976	Lawrence Garvie
Wilfred Bishop	'Minister of Natural Resources & Energy'; 1972–1974	Roland Boudreau
H. H. Williamson	'Minister of Economic Growth'; 1970–1972	Paul Creaghan
J. Adrien Levesque	'Minister of Agriculture and Rural Development'; 1970–1972	J. Stewart Brooks
Legislative Assembly of New Brunswick
Preceded by Harrison Monteith	MLA for Carleton County; 1960–1978	Succeeded by Steven Porter
