= New Brunswick Housing Corporation =

- Type: Crown Corporation
- Industry: Housing
- Founded: 1968; 58 years ago Re-established: 2023; 3 years ago
- Key people: David Hickey (Minister); François Boutot (president & CEO)
- Website: www2.gnb.ca/content/gnb/en/departments/new-brunswick-housing-corporation.html

The New Brunswick Housing Corporation (NBHC, French: Société d'habitation du Nouveau-Brunswick) is a crown corporation in the Canadian province of New Brunswick.

The New Brunswick Housing Corporation exists as a crown corporation under the guidelines of the New Brunswick Housing Act. It contains a board of directors consisting of a chair, which is the minister, a vice-chair, which is the president and CEO, as well as between three and eight other individuals.

== History ==
The New Brunswick Housing Corporation was initially established in 1968, and was later re-established in March 2023 as a means to address the provincial housing crisis. Upon its re-establishment, it was led by Jill Green, then-Minister responsible for housing. In September 2023, François Boutot was appointed as the president and CEO of the corporation. In November 2024, David Hickey became the minister responsible for the corporation.
