= Greg Turner (politician) =

Canadian politician

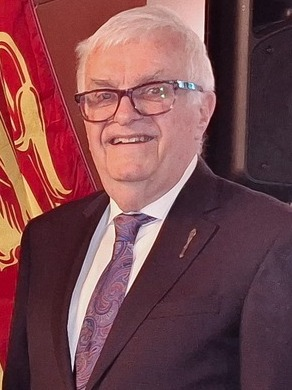
- Turner in 2024

Minister of Post-secondary Education, Training and Labour
- In office February 2, 2024 – November 2, 2024
- Premier: Blaine Higgs
- Preceded by: Trevor Holder
- Succeeded by: Alyson Townsend

Minister responsible for Immigration
- In office February 2, 2024 – November 2, 2024
- Premier: Blaine Higgs
- Preceded by: Arlene Dunn
- Succeeded by: Jean-Claude D’Amours

Minister responsible for Economic Development and Small Business and Minister responsible for Opportunities NB
- In office June 27, 2023 – November 2, 2024
- Premier: Blaine Higgs
- Preceded by: Arlene Dunn
- Succeeded by: Luke Randall

Member of the Legislative Assembly of New Brunswick for Moncton South
- In office September 14, 2020 – September 19, 2024
- Preceded by: Cathy Rogers
- Succeeded by: Claire Johnson

Member-at-large of the Moncton City Council
- In office May 2016 – September 14, 2020
- Preceded by: Dawn Arnold
- Succeeded by: Vacant

Personal details
- Born: Gregory Turner; Moncton, New Brunswick, Canada

Gregory Turner is a former Canadian politician who represented Moncton South in the Legislative Assembly of New Brunswick from 2020 until his defeat in the 2024 New Brunswick general election. He was chair of the Standing Committee on Economic Policy and vice-chair of the Standing Committee on Procedure, Privileges and Legislative Officers.

In June 2023, he was appointed Minister of Economic Development by Premier Blaine Higgs. In February 2024, he was also appointed Minister of Post-secondary Education, Training and Labour and Minister responsible for immigration, following the resignation of Arlene Dunn.

== Electoral record ==
=== Moncton South ===
2024 New Brunswick general election
** Preliminary results — Not yet official **
Party	Candidate	Votes	%	±%
Liberal	Claire Johnson	3,559	53.21	+26.4
Progressive Conservative	Greg Turner	2,229	33.33	-11.7
Green	Vincent Merola	900	13.46	-4.9
Total valid votes		6,688	99.76	
Total rejected ballots		16	0.24	
Turnout		6,704	59.13	
Eligible voters		11,338		
Liberal gain from Progressive Conservative		Swing		+19.0
Source: Elections New Brunswick

2020 New Brunswick general election
Party	Candidate	Votes	%	±%
Progressive Conservative	Greg Turner	2,734	42.09	+10.09
Liberal	Tyson Milner	1,966	30.26	-17.18
Green	Josephine Watson	1,245	19.17	+9.55
People's Alliance	Marilyn Crossman-Riel	311	5.10	-2.04
New Democratic	Rebecca Rogers	220	3.39	-0.43
Total valid votes		6,496		
Total rejected ballots		12	0.18	-0.17
Turnout		6,508	58.74	+0.73
Eligible voters		11,079		
Progressive Conservative gain from Liberal		Swing		+13.63
Source: Elections New Brunswick
