= Claire Johnson =

Canadian politician from New Brunswick

Claire Johnson MLA

Minister of Education and Early Childhood Development
- Incumbent
- Assumed office November 2, 2024
- Premier: Susan Holt
- Preceded by: Bill Hogan

Member of the New Brunswick Legislative Assembly for Moncton South
- Incumbent
- Assumed office October 21, 2024
- Preceded by: Greg Turner

Personal details
- Party: Liberal

Claire Johnson is a Canadian politician, who was elected to the Legislative Assembly of New Brunswick in the 2024 election. She was elected in the riding of Moncton South unseating Progressive Conservative incumbent Greg Turner.

Johnson is a university professor by profession. On November 1, 2024, it was announced that she was placed on the cabinet as Minister of Education and Early Childhood Development.

== Electoral record ==
2024 New Brunswick general election
** Preliminary results — Not yet official **
Party	Candidate	Votes	%	±%
Liberal	Claire Johnson	3,559	53.21	+26.4
Progressive Conservative	Greg Turner	2,229	33.33	-11.7
Green	Vincent Merola	900	13.46	-4.9
Total valid votes		6,688	99.76	
Total rejected ballots		16	0.24	
Turnout		6,704	59.13	
Eligible voters		11,338		
Liberal gain from Progressive Conservative		Swing		+19.0
Source: Elections New Brunswick
