= Ed Doherty (politician) =

Canadian politician

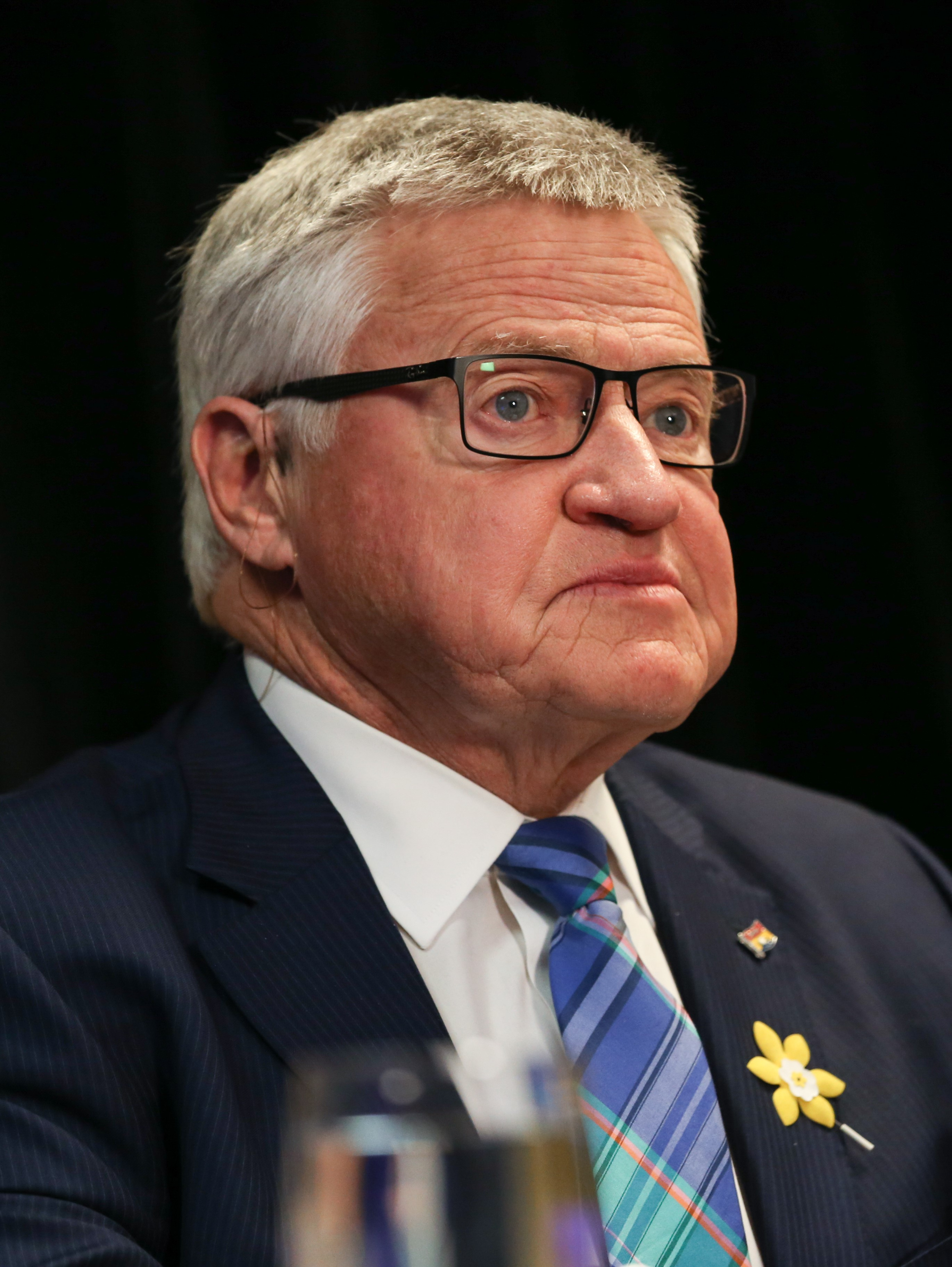
- Doherty in 2017

Minister of Government Services
- In office October 7, 2014 – September 5, 2017
- Premier: Brian Gallant
- Preceded by: Sue Stultz
- Succeeded by: Serge Rousselle

Member of the New Brunswick Legislative Assembly for Saint John Harbour
- In office September 22, 2014 – September 24, 2018
- Preceded by: Carl Killen
- Succeeded by: Gerry Lowe
- In office November 14, 2005 – September 27, 2010
- Preceded by: Elizabeth Weir
- Succeeded by: Carl Killen

Personal details
- Born: May 22, 1949 (age 76) Moncton, New Brunswick
- Party: Liberal
- Spouse: Mary Reid

Edward Joseph "Ed" Doherty, (born May 22, 1949) is a Canadian politician and retired ophthalmologist from New Brunswick, who has served in the Legislative Assembly of New Brunswick representing the riding of Saint John Harbour.

He was born in Moncton, New Brunswick, the son of Joseph Doherty and Marion McMackin, and was educated in Moncton, at St. Francis Xavier University and at Dalhousie University. Doherty interned at the Jewish General Hospital in Montreal and practised in Antigonish, Nova Scotia from 1975 to 1980. After continuing his medical studies at Dalhousie University, he set up practice in Saint John in 1984, retiring in 2006. Doherty also lectured in the Department of Ophthalmology at Dalhousie University, was a visiting ophthalmologist on the island of Dominica and, from 1994 to 2003, served as consulting eye physician for the Saint John Flames.

A Liberal, he was elected in a by-election on November 14, 2005, in a race for a seat previously held by the New Democratic Party and in which the Progressive Conservative Party's candidate was thought to be the frontrunner. Doherty's victory, by a margin of 55-26-18 over the PC and NDP candidates, respectively.

The Liberals were successful in gaining power in 2006 and Doherty was re-elected to his seat and joined the cabinet thereafter. He was defeated in the 2010 election by Carl Killen of the Progressive Conservatives, but defeated Killen to reclaim the seat in the 2014 election.

== Personal life ==
Doherty, who is a retired ophthalmologist, currently lives in Shediac. He volunteers at a local food bank.

New Brunswick provincial government of Shawn Graham
Cabinet posts (2)
Predecessor	Office	Successor
Jack Keir (acting)	Minister of Supply and Services; 2008–2010	Claude Williams
Jody Carr	Minister of Post-Secondary Education, Training and Labour; 2006–2008 previously styled as Minister of Post-Secondary Education and Training	Donald Arseneault
Special Cabinet Responsibilities
Predecessor	Title	Successor
Rose-May Poirier	Minister responsible for Aboriginal Affairs; 2006–2008	Rick Brewer
