= Carl Killen =

Canadian politician

MLA for Saint John Harbour
- In office October 12, 2010 – September 22, 2014
- Preceded by: Ed Doherty
- Succeeded by: Ed Doherty

Personal details
- Born: Saint John, New Brunswick, Canada
- Party: Progressive Conservative

Carl Killen is a former Canadian politician, who was elected to the Legislative Assembly of New Brunswick in the 2010 provincial election. He represented the electoral district of Saint John Harbour as a member of the Progressive Conservatives until the 2014 provincial election, when he was defeated by Ed Doherty, the former MLA Killen had defeated in 2010.

Killen was previously elected to Saint John City Council in Ward 3 and was a high school teacher for 28 years.
