= James E. Lockyer =

Canadian politician and lawyer

James E. Lockyer ONB CD KC

MLA for Moncton West
- In office 1987–1994
- Preceded by: Mabel DeWare
- Succeeded by: District abolished

MLA for Moncton South
- In office 1994–1999
- Preceded by: District established
- Succeeded by: Joan MacAlpine-Stiles

Personal details
- Born: James Edward Lockyer; May 27, 1949 (age 77) Halifax, Nova Scotia, Canada
- Party: Liberal
- Spouse: Brigitte
- Children: Sarah; Patrick
- Parent(s): Owen William Lockyer; Rowena North
- Occupation: Lawyer, politician, law professor

James Edward Lockyer ONB CD KC (born May 27, 1949) is a Canadian lawyer, law professor, and former politician.

== Life and career ==
James E. Lockyer graduated with a BA degree from Mount Allison University in Sackville, New Brunswick and earned his LLB at the University of New Brunswick. He went on to London, England to study at the London School of Economics and Political Science, obtaining his LLM degree in 1976. He obtained a DEA from the Université de Paris 1 (Panthéon-Sorbonne) in 1979.

After being admitted to the Barrister's Society of New Brunswick in September 1975, Lockyer practiced law with the Moncton law firm of Stewart & Cooper. In November 1977, he became the first full-time person hired by the Université de Moncton for its new Faculté de droit (Law Faculty) which was established to teach common law in French. Lockyer taught at the Faculté de droit until June 1987. During this time he was appointed vice-dean and acting dean in 1983 and then Dean of the Faculté de droit from 1984 to 1987. After his career in provincial elected office (1987-1999), he returned to the Faculté de droit in 2000 where he taught full-time until 2019. Since then, he has remained active at the Faculté de droit teaching courses in trial and appellate advocacy. In 2020, he began teaching trial advocacy as a visiting professor at the Faculty of Law at the University of New Brunswick. His area of expertise is Civil Procedure, the Law of Sales and both appellate and trial advocacy.

From 2007 until 2017 Lockyer taught trial advocacy to lawyers at Osgoode Hall Law School's annual Intensive Trial Advocacy Workshop and since 2007 continues to teach members of the Quebec Bar in its program "Techniques de plaidoirie" at the Université de Sherbrooke. From 2007 until 2019 he was a visiting teacher of trial advocacy to students at the University of Notre Dame Law School in South Bend Indiana. From 2008 to 2016 he conducted biannual Intensive Trial Advocacy Programs for Atlantic Canadian lawyers at the Université de Moncton where he has also presented written advocacy workshops for lawyers. He has conducted trial advocacy programs for the Alberta Public Prosecutors Association, the Quebec Department of Justice, law firms and in 2024, 2025, 2026 organized and presented seven-day trial advocacy programs for Atlantic Canadian lawyers at the University of New Brunswick and the Université de Moncton.

He is a past president of the Sopinka Cup National Trial Advocacy Competition involving Canadian law schools and was a member of the organizing committee from 2001 until 2022. From 2007 until 2023, he authored the annual case file problem for the Sopinka Cup Competition. From 2001 to 2023, and in 2026 he organized and conducted the annual McKelvey Cup Trial Advocacy Competition for Atlantic region law schools. In June 2008, Lockyer was named a recipient of the American College of Trial Lawyers "Award of Merit" for his contribution to the teaching of trial advocacy.

For 16 years (1983-1999) Lockyer held public office. He was elected to Moncton City Council in 1983 and re-elected in 1986. In the 1987 New Brunswick general election, Lockyer was elected to the Legislative Assembly of New Brunswick as the Liberal Party's candidate for the riding of Moncton West. He was re-elected in 1991 and 1995 New Brunswick general elections. Following his party taking power, on October 27, 1987 Lockyer was appointed Attorney General and Minister of Justice, posts he would hold twice. In addition, he served as the Minister of Supply and Services and Minister of Education. For three months in 1998 he was the acting Minister of Economic Development and Tourism. His last Cabinet post was Solicitor General in 1998-1999. In the 1999 New Brunswick general election James Lockyer lost by 1,253 votes to the Progressive Conservative Party's candidate. During his time as a member of the Legislative Assembly, Lockyer was Chairman of The Select Committee on Maritime Economic Union which reported its recommendations to the Legislative Assembly in 1992 as well as a member of the Law Amendments Committee and other standing committees.

Lockyer is a former president of the Law Society of New Brunswick. He was appointed Queen's Counsel in 1987. Between 2003 and 2005, he was a member on the Federal Government's Transportation Appeal Tribunal of Canada (TATC). He is a former member of the New Brunswick Securities Commission. He served twenty-three years in the Canadian Armed Forces Reserve and was awarded the Canadian Forces' Decoration and Clasp. He was appointed Honorary Colonel of the 8th Canadian Hussars (Princess Louise's) from 2016 to 2024. On June 1, 2024, he was appointed Colonel-Commandant of the Royal Canadian Armoured Corps .

Active in community affairs, Lockyer is a former vice-president of the Muriel McQueen Fergusson Foundation and was actively involved in its fight against domestic and family violence. He served for many years as vice-president of the Dr. George L. Dumont Hospital's Tree of Hope Cancer fundraising campaign. He is a former Board Chair of the Greater Moncton YMCA. He was Chair of the organizing committee of the 2009 World Curling Championships. He was named recipient of the Lieutenant-Governor's Dialogue Award by Dialogue NB in June 2009. Lockyer co-chaired the YWCA "Transitionelle" Campaign raising funds for the establishment of the "Jean Irving Centre for Women and Children" in Moncton. He is a past chair of the 3Plus Economic Development Corporation for the Greater Moncton area (Dieppe-Moncton-Riverview). He is currently the Vice Chair of the Board of Directors of the Greater Moncton Romeo LeBlanc International Airport. He remains involved with various community organizations. On November 27, 2018 he was invested into the Order of New Brunswick. In 2022, he was awarded Moncton Rotary Club's 101 Resilience award. In 2023, he was awarded the Distinguished Service Award by the New Brunswick Branch of the Canadian Bar Association. In 2024 he was appointed Chair of the Board of Directors of the CHU Dumont Foundation (Dr. Georges-L.-Dumont University Hospital Centre).

An instrument-rated private pilot with single, multi-engine and seaplane ratings, Lockyer is the President of the local branch of the Canadian Owners and Pilots Association's (COPA), and a former Vice Chair and member of the Board of Directors of the Moncton Flight College. He is a former member of the Board of Directors of Hope Air, a national charity that arranges free non-emergency medical flights for low-income Canadians who must travel far from home to access healthcare. He remains a volunteer pilot with Hope Air. Lockyer is a former member of the Board of Directors of the Nova Scotia International Air Show Association. He is a former vice-president of the Halifax Harbour Airport Association and he is vice-president of the Moncton Aero Club Inc.

Lockyer resides in Moncton with his wife, the Honorable Brigitte Robichaud. They have two adult children.

== Election results ==
=== 1999 election ===
1999 New Brunswick election: Moncton South
Party	Candidate	Votes	%	±	Expenditures
Progressive Conservative	Joan MacAlpine	3898	53.91	+36.27	$19,681
Liberal	Jim Lockyer	2645	36.58	-25.25	$17,326
NDP	Teresa Sullivan	687	9.50	+1.26	$2,650
Total valid votes/expense limit		7230	100.00	$24,708	
Total rejected ballots		22	0.20		
Turnout		7252	67.53	+4.81	
Electors on list		10,739			
Progressive Conservative gain from Liberal		Swing	+30.76		

=== 1995 election ===
1995 New Brunswick general election: Moncton South
Party	Candidate	Votes	%	±%	Expenditures
Liberal	Jim Lockyer	4,332	61.83	+14.12	$16,265
Progressive Conservative	Bob MacKenzie Leighton	1,236	17.64	-2.24	$8,835
Confederation of Regions	Don Freeman	861	12.29	-10.38	$854
New Democratic	Blair McInnis	577	8.24	-1.49	$5,017
Total valid votes/expense limit		7,006	100.0		$24,966
Total rejected ballots		26	0.23		
Turnout		7,032	62.72	-12.89	
Eligible voters		11,212			
Liberal hold		Swing		+9.58	

=== 1991 election ===
1991 New Brunswick general election: Moncton West
Party	Candidate	Votes	%	±%	Expenditures
Liberal	Jim Lockyer	3,558	47.71	-16.53	$16,802
Confederation of Regions	Ben Stymiest	1,691	22.67	–	$6,235
Progressive Conservative	Arthur Hayden	1,483	19.88	-5.48	$3,059
New Democratic	Stephanie Day Domingue	726	9.73	-0.67	
Total valid votes/expense limit		7,458	100.0		$20,070
Total rejected ballots		40	0.41		
Turnout		7,498	76.40	-0.36	
Eligible voters		9,814			
Liberal hold		Swing		-6.92	

=== 1987 election ===
1987 New Brunswick election: Moncton West
Party	Candidate	Votes	%	±	Expenditures
Liberal	Jim Lockyer	4853	64.24	+26.85	$14,787
Progressive Conservative	Mabel DeWare	1916	25.36	-29.48	$13,295
NDP	David Lang	786	10.40	+2.63	$1,808
Total valid votes/expense limit		7555	100.00	$16,476	
Total rejected ballots		47	0.47		
Turnout		7602	76.76	-2.13	
Electors on List		9904			
Liberal gain from Progressive Conservative		Swing	+28.17		

New Brunswick provincial government of Frank McKenna
Cabinet posts (5)
Predecessor	Office	Successor
Jane Barry	Solicitor General; 1998–1999	Percy Mockler
Bernard Richard	Attorney General and Minister of Justice; 1997–1998	Greg Byrne
Vaughn Blaney	Minister of Education; 1995–1997	Bernard Richard
Laureen Jarrett	Minister of Supply and Services; 1994–1995	Bruce A. Smith
David Clark	Attorney General and Minister of Justice; 1987–1991	Edmond Blanchard
