= Department of Post-Secondary Education and Training (New Brunswick) =

The Department of Post-Secondary Education, Training and Labour is a department of the government of New Brunswick. It was created in 2006 from the Department of Training and Employment Development and parts of the Department of Education as the Department of Post-Secondary Education and Training, "labour" was added to its name later in 2006.

== Ministers ==
#	Minister	Term	Government
1.	Jody Carr	February 14, 2006 - October 3, 2006	under Bernard Lord
2.	Ed Doherty	October 3, 2006 - November 12, 2008	under Shawn Graham
3.	Donald Arseneault	November 12, 2008 - October 12, 2010	under Shawn Graham
4.	Martine Coulombe	October 12, 2010 - October 8, 2012	under David Alward

See Department of Post-Secondary Education, Training and Labour (New Brunswick)
