= Laureen Jarrett =

Canadian politician

Ella Laureen Jarrett (born November 2, 1938) is a teacher and former political figure in New Brunswick, Canada. She represented Kings West and then Saint John Kings in the Legislative Assembly of New Brunswick from 1987 to 1999 as a Liberal member.

She was born in Halifax, Nova Scotia and was educated at the New Brunswick Teachers' College and the University of New Brunswick. Jarrett taught school in New Brunswick and Maine. She served in the province's Executive Council as the Minister of Income Assistance, the Minister of Supply and Services and the Minister of State for Mines and Energy.

New Brunswick provincial government of Frank McKenna
Special Cabinet Responsibilities
Predecessor	Title	Successor
Doug Tyler	Minister of State for Mines & Energy; 1994–1995	Albert Doucet
Cabinet posts (2)
Predecessor	Office	Successor
Bruce A. Smith	Minister of Supply and Services; 1991–1994	James E. Lockyer
Paul Dawson	Minister of Income Assistance; 1987–1991	Ann Breault
