= Talk of the Town (talk show) =

1982 American TV programme

- Genre: Talk show
- Written by: Doug Raymond and Mark Tan
- Directed by: Doug Raymond
- Starring: Jaye P. Morgan; Pat Cooper
- Theme music composer: Douglas R. Momary
- Country of origin: United States
- Original language: English
- No. of seasons: 1

Production
- Producer: Stan Lipton
- Production locations: Las Vegas, NV
- Editor: John Nielsen
- Running time: 60 minutes per show

Original release
- Release: 1982

Talk of the Town was a short lived comedy and talk show performed at the Imperial Palace Hotel and Casino in Las Vegas, Nevada in 1982 and aired on cable television. Directed by Doug Raymond and hosted by comedian Jaye P. Morgan, Talk of the Town was primarily a talk-show in which some guests performed short stand-up comedy routines before joining a panel. Other guests simply joined the panel for discussion of their personal lives and careers. Discussion often included sexually oriented jokes, insults and gossip with Morgan and her co-host comedian Pat Cooper.

Morgan often emphasized the unscripted and adult nature of the show. In the first of the video episodes she introduces the show as Talk of the Town as "The most adult show on television. It's going to shock you, turn you on, turn you off, but it will make you think and see and experience. You will see things on this show that will surprise you, shock you, so kick back, brush away those conservative cobwebs..."

Roughly three-quarters of the way through each show, a short lingerie fashion show took place with models wearing bathing-suits, underwear or nightgowns provided by Las Vegas design shop Midnight Lace, which at that time was located in the Fashion Show Mall in Las Vegas.

== Home Video ==
Talk of the Town was filmed live for cable television and subsequently released by adult video distributor VCX on their in house non-adult video label VCII. Two cassette tapes of Talk of the Town were released by VCII. Show 1 (catalog number VC115) was released in 1983, and Show 2 (catalog number VC127) in 1984.
The covers of both VCII VHS releases shared the same cover design as nearly all of VCII's releases. The bottom third of the cover was white with the distributors logo, while the top two thirds displayed artwork from the featured content. In the case of Talk of the Town, both covers had the same art in a different color scheme and with the starring personalities in star shaped frames.
Just For the Hell Of It, a rare and out of print video distributor has compiled both of the shows onto a single DVD volume. The DVD cover also reproduces to a large extent the original art used on the VCII VHS cassette covers.

=== Show 1 ===
Comedian Murray Langston performs a routine as his character The Unknown Comic before removing his bag/mask and discussing his current career with Morgan and Cooper.
Comedian Rip Taylor performs a short set of his standard routine before joining the guest panel.
Actress Linda Blair joins the panel to discuss her career since The Exorcist (film) (1973).
After the fashion show interlude adult film actress Samantha Fox comes on to discuss some of the technical aspects of, and her personal experiences working in adult film.

=== Show 2 ===
None of the guests on Show 2 perform stand-up routines, each merely joining the panel to answer questions by Morgan and the other guests. A running theme in Show 2 is comedian Buddy Hackett whom a number of the guests denigrate, insult and compliment alternately.
Actor and comedian Redd Foxx was the "featured guest"
in addition to: Actor and comedian Larry Storch
Comedian Jack Carter
Rusty Warren discusses her role in liberating women's sexual expression through her comedy routines, including specific reference to her 1960 comedy album Knockers Up and its impact on women's liberation.
