= Gerry Lowe (politician) =

Canadian politician

Member of the New Brunswick Legislative Assembly for Saint John Harbour
- In office September 24, 2018 – August 17, 2020
- Preceded by: Ed Doherty
- Succeeded by: Arlene Dunn

Personal details
- Party: Liberal

Gerry Lowe is a Canadian politician, who was elected to the Legislative Assembly of New Brunswick in the 2018 election. He represented the electoral district of Saint John Harbour as a member of the Liberal Party. He did not stand in the 2020 New Brunswick general election.

Prior to his election to the legislature, Lowe served on Saint John City Council. Lowe was reelected to the Saint John Common Council in 2021.

== Electoral record ==
2018 New Brunswick general election: Saint John Harbour
Party	Candidate	Votes	%	±%
Liberal	Gerry Lowe	1,865	32.9%	
Progressive Conservative	Barry Ogden	1,855	32.7%	
New Democratic	Jennifer McKenzie	836	14.7%	
Green	Wayne Dryer	721	12.7%	
People's Alliance	Margot Brideau	393	6.9%	
Total valid votes			100.0	
Total rejected ballots				
Turnout				
Eligible voters				
