= Arlene Dunn =

Canadian politician

The Honourable Arlene Dunn MLA
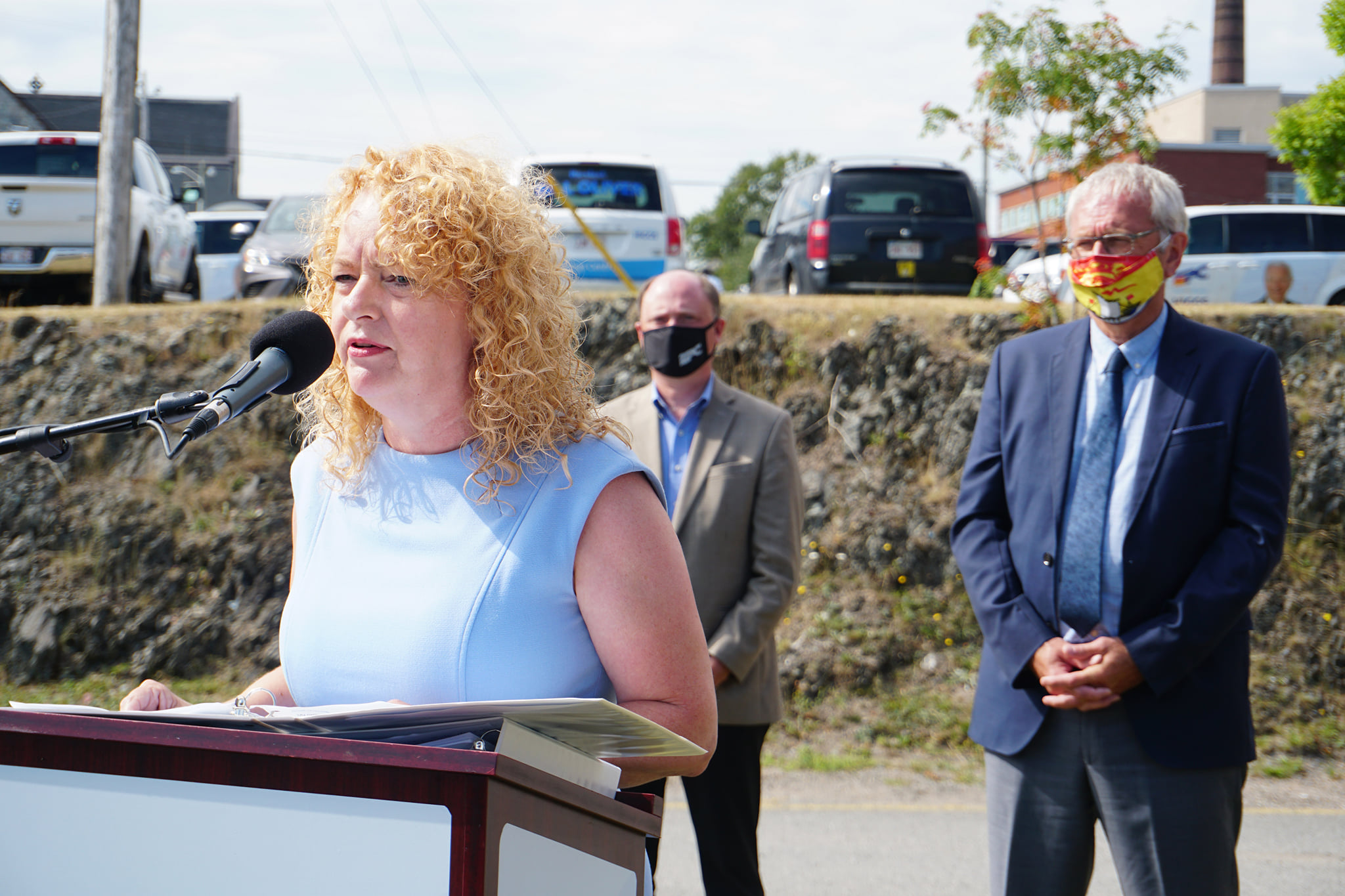

Minister of Post-Secondary Education, Training, and Labour
- In office June 27, 2023 – February 2, 2024
- Preceded by: Trevor Holder

Minister of Indigenous Affairs
- In office September 29, 2020 – February 2, 2024
- Premier: Blaine Higgs
- Preceded by: Jake Stewart
- Succeeded by: Mike Holland

Member of the New Brunswick Legislative Assembly for Saint John Harbour
- In office September 14, 2020 – February 8, 2024
- Preceded by: Gerry Lowe
- Succeeded by: David Hickey

Personal details
- Party: Progressive Conservative

Arlene Dunn is a Canadian Progressive Conservative politician who has represented Saint John Harbour in the Legislative Assembly of New Brunswick since 2020.

Dunn is a member of the Executive Council of New Brunswick.

On February 2, 2024 Dunn announced her immediate resignation from cabinet. She resigned her seat in the Legislative Assembly six days later on February 8.

== Biography ==
Arlene Dunn has held different functions in construction unions, notably the post of director of Canada's Building Trades Unions.
