= Paul Creaghan =

Canadian politician

Member of the Legislative Assembly of New Brunswick
- In office 1970–1978
- Succeeded by: Mabel DeWare
- Constituency: Moncton West

Personal details
- Born: March 27, 1937 (age 89) Moncton, New Brunswick
- Party: Progressive Conservative Party of New Brunswick
- Spouse: Sandra Ann Fenwick
- Children: 2
- Occupation: lawyer

Paul S. Creaghan (born March 27, 1937) was a Canadian attorney, politician, and heir to Creaghan's. He served in the Legislative Assembly of New Brunswick from 1974 to 1978 from the electoral district of Moncton West, a member of the Progressive Conservative party.
