= Sue Stultz =

Canadian politician (1952/1953 – 2024)

Susan Stultz

Member of the New Brunswick Legislative Assembly for Moncton West
- In office September 27, 2010 – September 22, 2014
- Preceded by: Joan MacAlpine-Stiles
- Succeeded by: Cathy Rogers

Personal details
- Born: 1952/1953 Moncton, New Brunswick, Canada
- Died: April 8, 2024 (aged 71)
- Party: Progressive Conservative

Susan Stultz (1952/1953 – April 8, 2024) was a Canadian politician, who was elected to the Legislative Assembly of New Brunswick in the 2010 provincial election. She represented the electoral district of Moncton West as a member of the Progressive Conservatives until the 2014 election, when she was defeated by Cathy Rogers.

Stultz died on April 8, 2024, at the age of 71.

== Election results ==
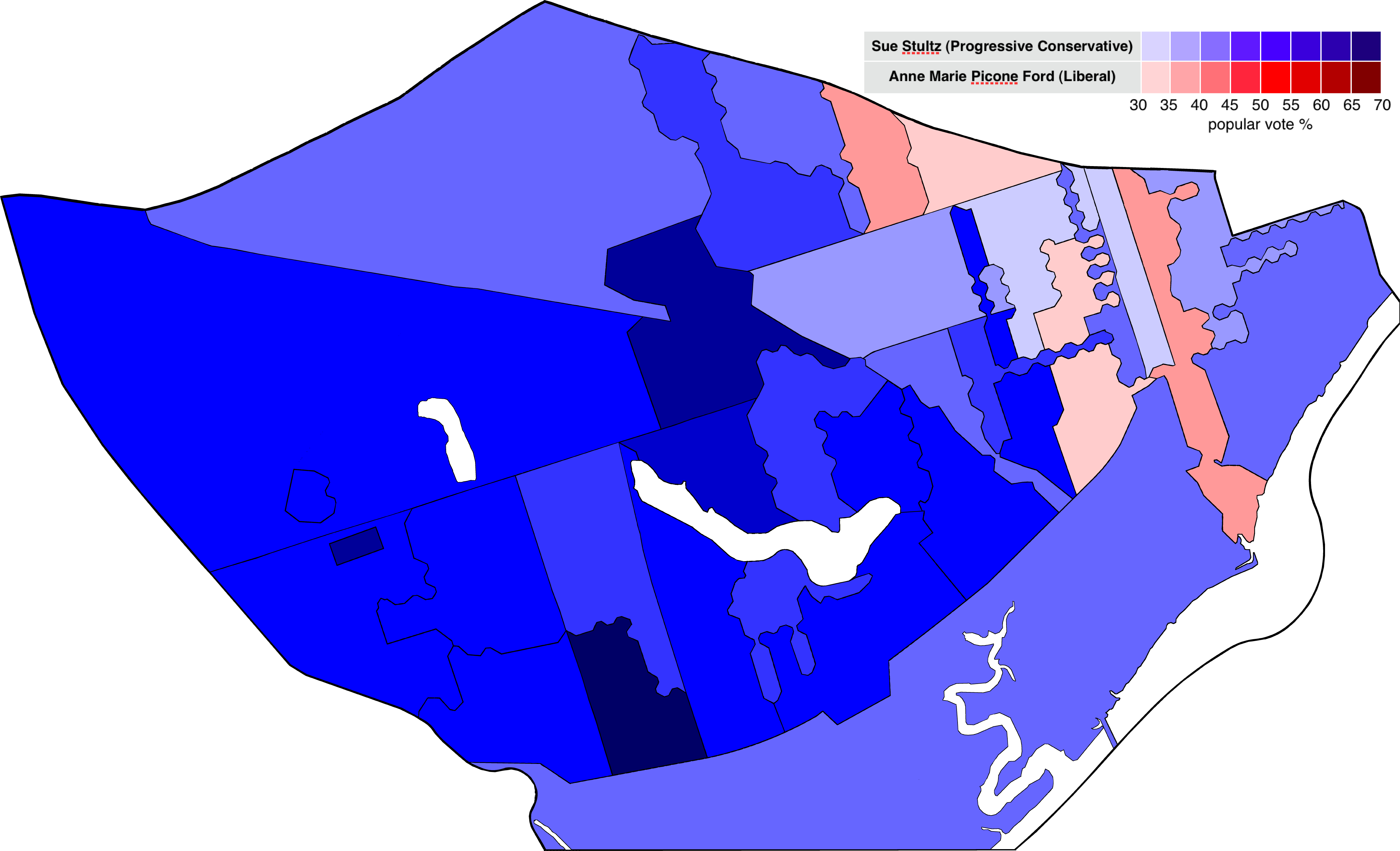
Moncton West's poll-by-poll winners for the 2010 New Brunswick election.

=== 2010 Election ===
2010 New Brunswick general election: Moncton West
Party	Candidate	Votes	%	±%	Expenditures
Progressive Conservative	Sue Stultz	2,981	48.52	−3.89	$27,212
Liberal	Anne Marie Picone Ford	2,006	32.65	−14.94	not filed
New Democratic	Shawna Gagné	576	9.38	–	$4,117
Green	Mathieu Laplante	503	8.19	–	$1,138
Independent	Barry Renouf	78	1.27	–	not filed
Total valid votes/expense limit		6,144	100.0		$31,712
Total rejected ballots		36	0.36		
Turnout		6,180	61.54	+1.78	
Eligible voters		10,043			
Progressive Conservative hold		Swing		+5.53	
Source: Elections New Brunswick

== Sources ==
- "Elections NB — Publications". Archived from the original on 15 October 2006.
