= David Alward =

Premier of New Brunswick from 2010 to 2014

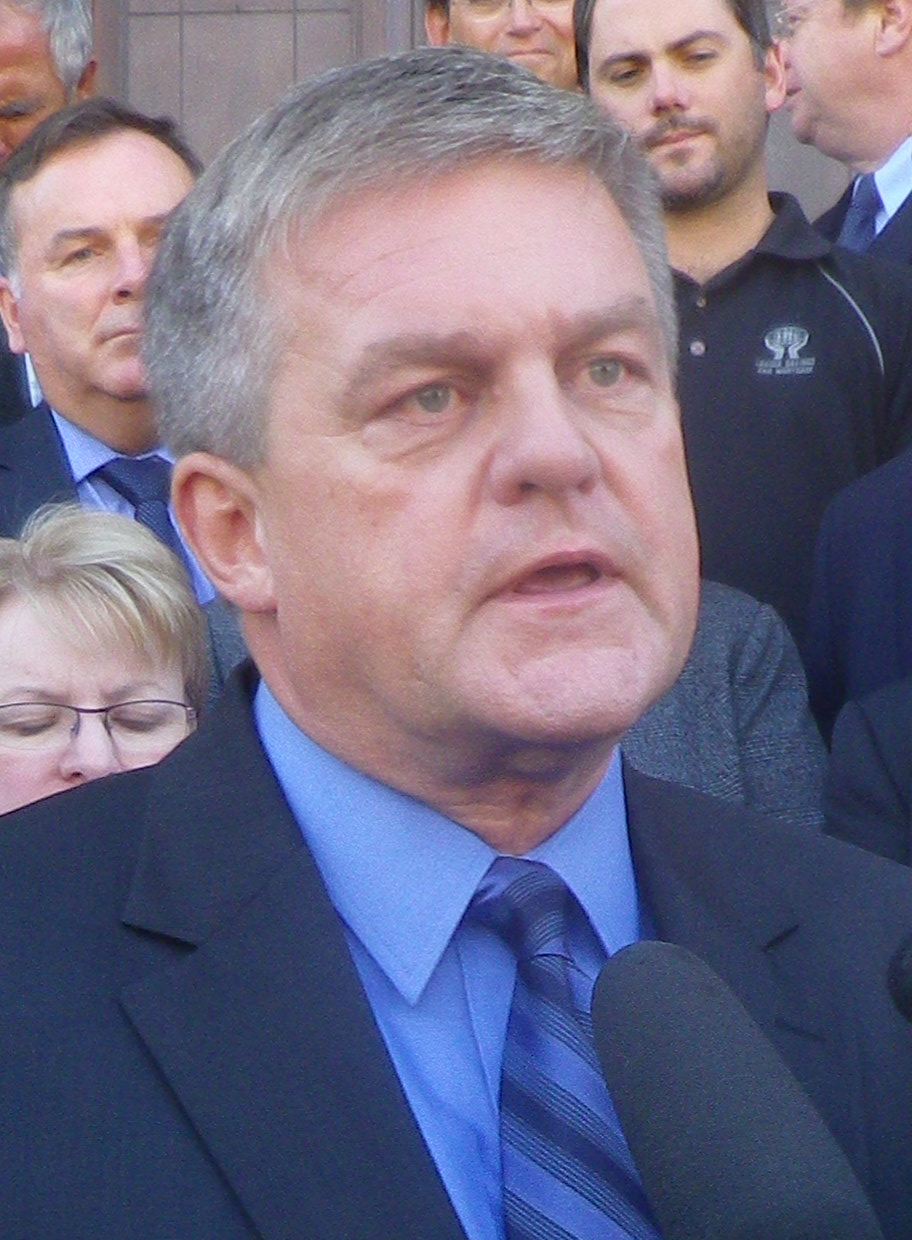
- Alward in 2012

32nd Premier of New Brunswick
- In office October 12, 2010 – October 7, 2014
- Monarch: Elizabeth II
- Lieutenant Governor: Graydon Nicholas
- Preceded by: Shawn Graham
- Succeeded by: Brian Gallant

Member of the New Brunswick Legislative Assembly for Woodstock Carleton (2014–2015)
- In office June 7, 1999 – May 22, 2015
- Preceded by: Bruce Smith
- Succeeded by: Stewart Fairgrieve

Dean of the Legislative Assembly of New Brunswick
- In office August 21, 2014 – May 22, 2015 Serving with Jody Carr; Madeleine Dubé; Trevor Holder; Kirk MacDonald
- Preceded by: Dale Graham

Personal details
- Born: David Nathan Alward; December 2, 1959 (age 66) Beverly, Massachusetts, U.S.
- Citizenship: Canada; United States (until 2015)
- Party: Progressive Conservative
- Spouse: Rhonda Lynn Stairs
- Children: 2
- Occupation: politician

David Nathan Alward (born December 2, 1959) is a Canadian politician who served as the 32nd premier of New Brunswick from 2010 to 2014.

Alward has been a member of the Legislative Assembly of New Brunswick since 1999 and was the leader of the Progressive Conservative Party of New Brunswick from 2008 to 2014. Elected to a majority government in a landslide in 2010, his party was defeated for re-election on September 22, 2014, and Alward resigned as Progressive Conservative Party of New Brunswick leader the following day. On April 24, 2015, Alward was named Canadian consul general in Boston.

== Early life ==
Alward was born in Beverly, Massachusetts, United States, and thus was a U.S. citizen from the time of his birth. The son of a minister, Alward moved to Atlantic Canada in his youth where he graduated from high school in Nackawic, New Brunswick. Alward received his post-secondary education in psychology in the United States at Bryan College in Dayton, Tennessee.

== Career ==
Alward worked as a federal civil servant from 1982 to 1996 when he went into business on his own. He operates a hobby farm where he raises purebred Hereford cattle. He also volunteered as an emergency medical technician and lab instructor with the St. John Ambulance and as a firefighter with the Meductic Fire Department. He served on the board of directors of the Carleton Regional Development Commission and the New Brunswick Hereford Association. He served on the Centennial Elementary School Parent Advisory Committee, the School District 12 Stay-in-School Committee, and the local agricultural employment board. Alward is an active member of his Meductic Church, and a member of the Woodstock Rotary Club.

== Political career ==
He was elected to the Legislative Assembly of New Brunswick, as a Progressive Conservative for the riding of Woodstock, in the 1999 election and re-elected in 2003. Following the 2003 election, he joined the cabinet of Premier Bernard Lord as Minister of Agriculture, Fisheries and Aquaculture.

On June 19, 2008, Alward became the first candidate in the 2008 Progressive Conservative leadership race. On October 18, 2008, he was elected leader of the party at the Progressive Conservative Party of New Brunswick leadership convention in Fredericton. Alward beat his only opponent, Robert MacLeod, by a margin of 2,269 votes to 1,760.

=== Premier of New Brunswick ===
On September 27, 2010, Alward's Progressive Conservatives won 42 of 55 seats to form a majority government. He was sworn in as the premier on October 12, 2010. On May 13, 2011, his government passed the Ownership of Minerals Act.

On December 3, 2012, he and Local Government Minister Bruce Fitch announced a cut in property taxes for businesses, farms, rental properties and cottages.

On March 12, 2014, he and Natural Resources Minister Paul Robichaud unveiled a new forest management plan, entitled "Putting our Resources to Work: A Strategy for Crown Lands Forest Management". This plan increased the annual allowable cut by 20%, and was endorsed by mill owner Jim Irving.

Alward was defeated in the 2014 New Brunswick general election and announced his resignation as party leader on September 23, 2014. He resigned from the legislature on May 22, 2015, after accepting a federal appointment as Canada's Consul General in Boston, and renounced U.S. citizenship to take up the position.
