= Bill Oliver (politician) =

Canadian politician

The Honourable Bill Oliver MLA
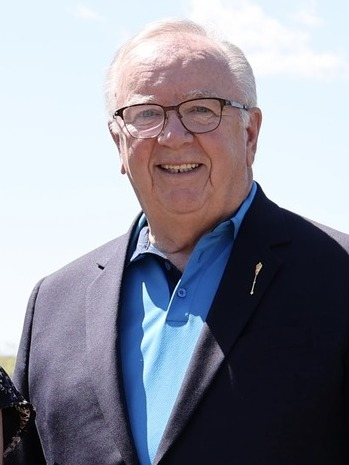
- Oliver in 2024

Speaker of the Legislative Assembly of New Brunswick
- In office October 7, 2020 – November 1, 2024
- Preceded by: Daniel Guitard
- Succeeded by: Francine Landry

Minister of Transportation and Infrastructure
- In office November 9, 2018 – September 29, 2020
- Premier: Blaine Higgs
- Preceded by: Denis Landry
- Succeeded by: Jill Green

Member of the New Brunswick Legislative Assembly for Kings Centre
- Incumbent
- Assumed office September 22, 2014
- Preceded by: District created

Personal details
- Born: William George Oliver
- Party: Progressive Conservative

William George Oliver is a Canadian politician, who was elected to the Legislative Assembly of New Brunswick in the 2014 provincial election. He represents the electoral district of Kings Centre as a member of the Progressive Conservatives. He was re-elected in the 2018 and 2020 provincial elections.

== Political career ==
While in opposition between 2014 and 2018, he was deputy whip and opposition critic for WorkSafeNB. From 2018 until being elected Speaker in 2020, Oliver served as Minister of Transportation and Infrastructure in the Higgs government.

On June 9, 2026, Oliver delivered a speech in the Legislative Assembly regarding proposed legislation to create an energy sector consumer advocate, during which he inadvertently read aloud multiple AI-generated prompts that had been left in his notes, including the line "Here's a more natural, flowing version of that section that reads like a legislative speech rather than a series of short points." The incident went viral in July 2026 after clips were shared on social media and covered internationally. Oliver subsequently acknowledged that he had not adequately reviewed the text before delivering it.

== Electoral record ==
=== Kings Centre ===
2024 New Brunswick general election: Kings Centre
Party	Candidate	Votes	%	±%
Progressive Conservative	Bill Oliver	3,821	49.9%	-11.64
Liberal	Brian Stephenson	2,557	33.4%	+21.17
Green	Bruce Dryer	1,136	14.8%	+1.29
Libertarian	Crystal Tays	139	1.8%	
Total valid votes		7,653		
Total rejected ballots				
Turnout				
Eligible voters				
Progressive Conservative hold		Swing		
Source: Elections New Brunswick

2020 New Brunswick general election
Party	Candidate	Votes	%	±%
Progressive Conservative	Bill Oliver	4,583	61.54	+18.43
Green	Bruce Dryer	1,006	13.51	+3.86
Liberal	Paul Adams	911	12.23	-11.32
People's Alliance	William Edgett	693	9.31	-9.87
New Democratic	Margaret Anderson Kilfoil	254	3.41	-1.10
Total valid votes		7,447	100.0	
Total rejected ballots		8	0.11	
Turnout		7,455	65.96	
Eligible voters		11,302		
Progressive Conservative hold		Swing		+7.29
Source: Elections New Brunswick

2018 New Brunswick general election
Party	Candidate	Votes	%	±%
Progressive Conservative	Bill Oliver	3,267	43.11	+7.45
Liberal	Bill Merrifield	1,785	23.55	-7.40
People's Alliance	Dave Peters	1,454	19.18	--
Green	Bruce Dryer	731	9.65	+5.09
New Democratic	Susan Jane Shedd	342	4.51	-19.58
Total valid votes		7,579	100.0	
Total rejected ballots		10		
Turnout		7,589	66.70	
Eligible voters		11,378		
Source: Elections New Brunswick

2014 New Brunswick general election
Party	Candidate	Votes	%
Progressive Conservative	Bill Oliver	2,431	35.66
Liberal	Shannon Merrifield	2,110	30.95
New Democratic	Daniel Anderson	1,642	24.09
Independent	Colby Fraser	323	4.74
Green	Mark Connell	311	4.56
Total valid votes		6,817	100.0
Total rejected ballots		18	0.26
Turnout		6,835	60.18
Eligible voters		11,357	
This riding was created from parts of Fundy-River Valley, Hampton-Kings and Sussex-Fundy-St. Martins, all of which elected a Progressive Conservative in the previous election. None of the three incumbents ran in this election.
Source: Elections New Brunswick
