= Rothesay (electoral district) =

Provincial electoral district in New Brunswick, Canada

New Brunswick electoral district
- The riding of Rothesay (as it exists from 2023) in relation to other New Brunswick electoral districts
- Coordinates: 45.385°N 65.965°W

Provincial electoral district
- Legislature: Legislative Assembly of New Brunswick
MLA
Alyson Townsend
Liberal
- District created: 1994
- First contested: 1995
- Last contested: 2024

Demographics
- Population (2011): 15,279
- Electors (2013): 10,962
- Census division(s): Kings County, Saint John County
- Census subdivision(s): Rothesay, Saint John, Simonds Parish, Rothesay Parish, Hampton Parish, Upham Parish

Rothesay is a provincial electoral district for the Legislative Assembly of New Brunswick, Canada. The riding consists of the Town of Rothesay and its surroundings.

The district was created in 1994 as Saint John-Kings out of parts of Saint John County, Kings County and a small portion of the eastern edge of the City of Saint John all in and around the Town of Rothesay, a bedroom community of Saint John. In 2006, its boundaries were reduced to be just Rothesay and its immediate surroundings so, as a result, its name was changed to Rothesay.

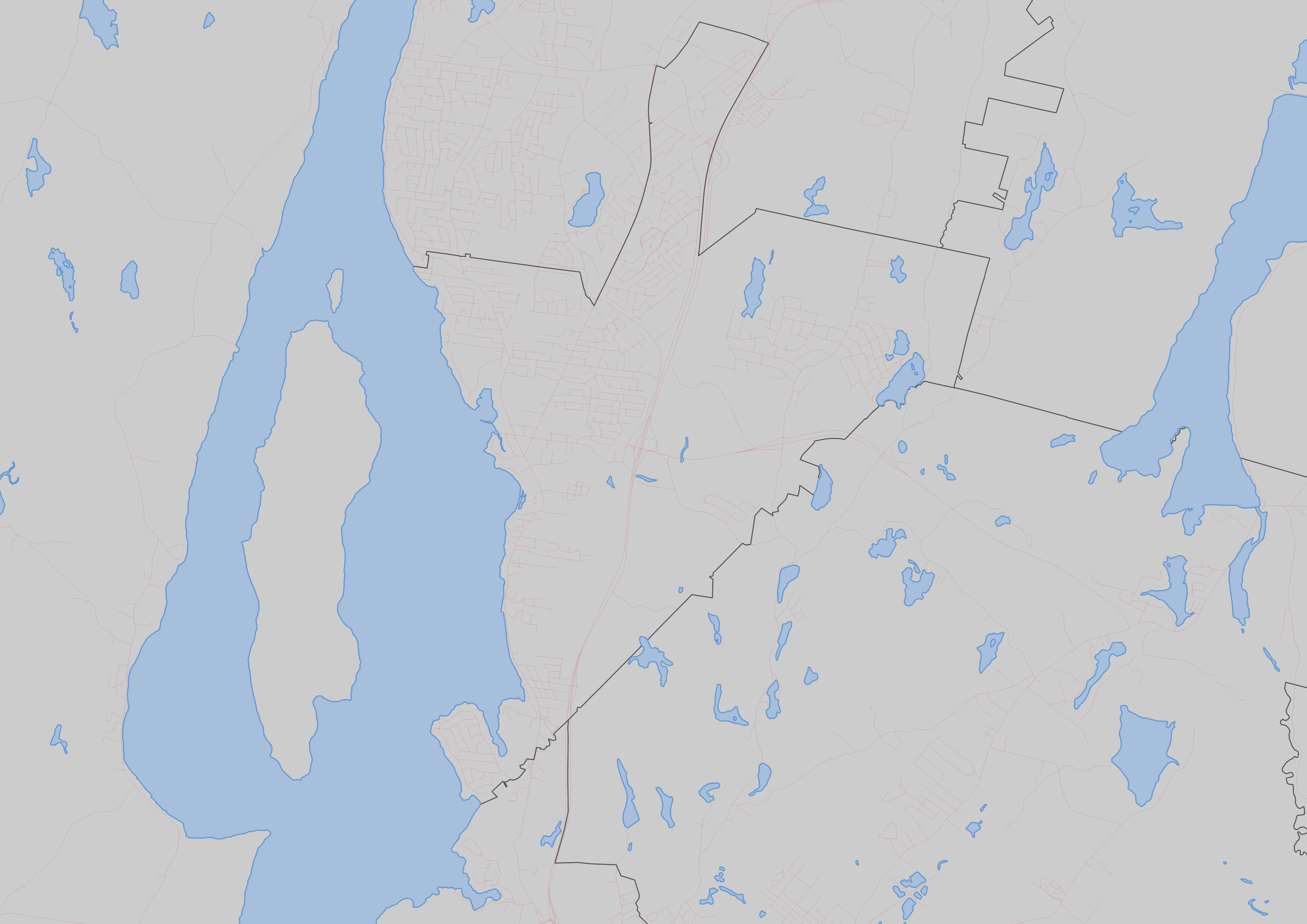
Rothesay (as it exists from 2023) and the roads in the riding

== 2012 by-election ==
Four-term incumbent Margaret-Ann Blaney, upon appointment as CEO of Efficiency NB, announced that she would resign the seat effective May 25, requiring a by-election to be called no later than November 25, 2012, which means an election will be held no later than December 31, 2012. On May 25, Premier of New Brunswick David Alward announced that the by-election would be held on June 25.

The incumbent Conservatives chose local lawyer and businessman Hugh John "Ted" Flemming III to be their candidate over local education council member Charlotte McGill Pierce. Flemming is the grandson and great-grandson of former premiers Hugh John Flemming and James Kidd Flemming respectively.

Media speculated whether one of the three candidates for the Liberal Party leadership or New Democratic leader Dominic Cardy will seek the seat in this by-election as none of them held seats in the legislative assembly. While none of the Liberal leadership candidates ran, NDP leader Cardy was acclaimed by his party. The People's Alliance of New Brunswick announced that they will not contest the election and endorsed Cardy's candidacy.

The Liberals chose retired police officer and clean water activist John Wilcox as their candidate over businessman Bill Gulliver by a margin of 81 to 49.

Sharon Murphy is the New Brunswick Green Party candidate and Marjorie MacMurray is running as an independent.

=== Issues ===
Early media coverage of the race focussed on the controversial appointment of Margaret-Ann Blaney as CEO of Efficiency New Brunswick, a crown corporation. Several prominent Progressive Conservatives backed away from the issue with Finance Minister Blaine Higgs demurring "it's certainly incumbent on me, and it's incumbent on my colleagues, to respect the decision that the premier makes," and PC candidate Hugh John "Ted" Flemming III stating "I wasn't there." Premier David Alward, at the time of her appointment said "I have full confidence that I have the best person for the job," and Blaney noted that her motivation for taking the post arose in part from a desire to spend more time closer to family in the Saint John area, after a difficult year. The appointment was criticized as political patronage by the New Brunswick Liberal Association and the New Brunswick New Democratic Party who noted that prior to Blaney accepting the $150,000-175,000 per year position it had been carried out by the deputy minister of Environment and Local Government at no additional cost to the taxpayer. Deputy Premier Paul Robichaud offered competing explanations for the appointment suggesting that the deputy minister of Environment and Local Government responsibilities over Efficiency New Brunswick was only "a temporary position." Dominic Cardy, the New Democratic candidate, proposed a bill to end political patronage that would require positions such as CEO of Efficiency New Brunswick to be publicly competed.

== Members of the Legislative Assembly ==
Assembly	Years	Member	Party
Saint John Kings; Riding created from Kings West, Saint John-Fundy and East Saint John
53rd	1995–1999	Laureen Jarrett	Liberal
54th	1999–2003	Margaret-Ann Blaney	Progressive Conservative
55th	2003–2006	Margaret-Ann Blaney	Progressive Conservative
Rothesay
56th	2006–2010	Margaret-Ann Blaney	Progressive Conservative
57th	2010–2012	Margaret-Ann Blaney	Progressive Conservative
57th	2012–2014	Ted Flemming	Progressive Conservative
58th	2014–2018	Ted Flemming	Progressive Conservative
59th	2018–2020	Ted Flemming	Progressive Conservative
60th	2020–2024	Ted Flemming	Progressive Conservative
61st	2024–Present	Alyson Townsend	Liberal

== Election results ==
=== Rothesay ===
2024 New Brunswick general election
** Preliminary results — Not yet official **
Party	Candidate	Votes	%	±%
Liberal	Alyson Townsend	4,085	50.48	+30.7
Progressive Conservative	Ted Flemming	3,373	41.68	-22.5
Green	Zara MacKay-Boyce	549	6.78	-2.3
Libertarian	Austin Venedam	85	1.05	
Total valid votes		8,092	99.91	
Total rejected ballots		7	0.09	
Turnout		8,099	72.81	
Eligible voters		11,123		
Liberal gain from Progressive Conservative		Swing		+26.6
Source: Elections New Brunswick

2020 provincial election redistributed results
Party	%
Progressive Conservative	64.2
Liberal	19.8
Green	9.1
People's Alliance	5.2
New Democratic	0.6
Independents	1.1

2020 New Brunswick general election
Party	Candidate	Votes	%	±%
Progressive Conservative	Ted Flemming	4,265	61.28	+11.30
Liberal	Jason Hickey	1,463	21.02	-7.21
Green	Ann McAllister	719	10.33	+2.27
People's Alliance	Michael Griffin	413	5.93	-4.25
Independent	Liz Kramer	56	0.80	
Independent	N. B. Barnett	44	0.63	
Total valid votes		6,960		
Total rejected ballots		14	0.20	-0.11
Turnout		6,974	63.22	-0.31
Eligible voters		11,031		
Progressive Conservative hold		Swing		+9.26
Source: Elections New Brunswick

2018 New Brunswick general election
Party	Candidate	Votes	%	±%
Progressive Conservative	Ted Flemming	3,542	49.98	+4.78
Liberal	Stephanie Tomilson	2,001	28.23	+0.85
People's Alliance	Michael Griffin	722	10.19	+10.19
Green	Ann McAllister	571	8.06	+3.86
New Democratic	Josh Floyd	251	3.54	-19.68
Total valid votes		7,087	100.0	
Total rejected ballots		22	0.31	
Turnout		7,109	63.53	
Eligible voters		11,190		
Progressive Conservative hold		Swing		+1.97
Source: Elections New Brunswick

2014 New Brunswick general election
Party	Candidate	Votes	%	±%
Progressive Conservative	Hugh J. "Ted" Flemming	3,034	45.20	+6.94
Liberal	Stephanie Tomilson	1,838	27.38	-3.89
New Democratic	John Wilcox	1,559	23.22	-4.05
Green	Ann McAllister	282	4.20	+2.58
Total valid votes		6,713	100.0	
Total rejected ballots		14	0.21	
Turnout		6,727	61.40	+16.29
Eligible voters		10,956		
Progressive Conservative notional hold		Swing		+5.42
Source: Elections New Brunswick

New Brunswick provincial by-election, June 25, 2012 On the resignation of Margaret-Ann Blaney, May 16, 2012
Party	Candidate	Votes	%	±%
Progressive Conservative	Hugh John "Ted" Flemming III	1,625	38.26	-18.31
Liberal	John Wilcox	1,328	31.27	+2.87
New Democratic	Dominic Cardy	1,158	27.27	+18.30
Green	Sharon Murphy	69	1.62	-4.43
Independent	Marjorie MacMurray	62	1.46	–
Total valid votes		4,242	100.0	
Total rejected ballots		11	0.26	
Turnout		4,253	45.11	-22.10
Eligible voters		9,428		
Progressive Conservative hold		Swing		-10.63
Source: Elections New Brunswick

2010 New Brunswick general election
Party	Candidate	Votes	%	±%
Progressive Conservative	Margaret-Ann Blaney	3,372	56.64	+8.01
Liberal	Victoria Clarke	1,690	28.39	-18.74
New Democratic	Pamela Scichilone	534	8.97	+4.73
Green	Sharon Murphy-Flatt	357	6.00	–
Total valid votes		5,953	100.0	
Total rejected ballots		41	0.68	
Turnout		5,994	67.21	
Eligible voters		8,918		
Progressive Conservative hold		Swing		+13.38
Source: Elections New Brunswick

2006 New Brunswick general election
Party	Candidate	Votes	%	±%
Progressive Conservative	Margaret-Ann Blaney	2,853	48.63	+0.60
Liberal	Paul Barry	2,765	47.13	+9.50
New Democratic	Troy Polchies	249	4.24	-7.88
Total valid votes		5,867	100.0	
Progressive Conservative hold		Swing		-4.45
Source: Elections New Brunswick

=== Saint John-Kings ===
2003 New Brunswick general election
Party	Candidate	Votes	%	±%
Progressive Conservative	Margaret-Ann Blaney	3,135	48.03	-17.56
Liberal	Tom Young	2,456	37.63	+12.68
New Democratic	Jeff Joseph Thibodeau	791	12.12	+2.66
Grey	Mark LeBlanc	145	2.22	–
Total valid votes		6,527	100.0	
Progressive Conservative hold		Swing		-15.12
Source: Elections New Brunswick

1999 New Brunswick general election
Party	Candidate	Votes	%	±%
Progressive Conservative	Margaret-Ann Blaney	4,605	65.59	+29.62
Liberal	Zita Longobardi	1,752	24.95	-19.66
New Democratic	Ken Wilcox	664	9.46	-2.13
Total valid votes		7,021	100.0	
Progressive Conservative gain from Liberal		Swing		+24.64
Source: Elections New Brunswick

1995 New Brunswick general election
Party	Candidate	Votes	%	±%
Liberal	Laureen Jarrett	3,176	44.61	
Progressive Conservative	Bill Artiss	2,561	35.97	
New Democratic	Pam Coates	825	11.59	
Independent	Gary Ewart	497	6.98	
Natural Law	Allison Pring	60	0.84	
Total valid votes		7,119	100.0	
Liberal notional gain		Swing		
Independent candidate Gary Ewart was previously affiliated with the Confederation of Regions.
Source: Elections New Brunswick

* This was a new district established in the New Brunswick electoral redistribution, 1994, when the old riding of Kings West was split between Hampton-Belleisle, Saint John-Kings and Kennebecasis.

== See also ==
- List of New Brunswick provincial electoral districts
- Canadian provincial electoral districts
