= Aaron Kennedy =

Canadian politician

Aaron Kennedy MLA
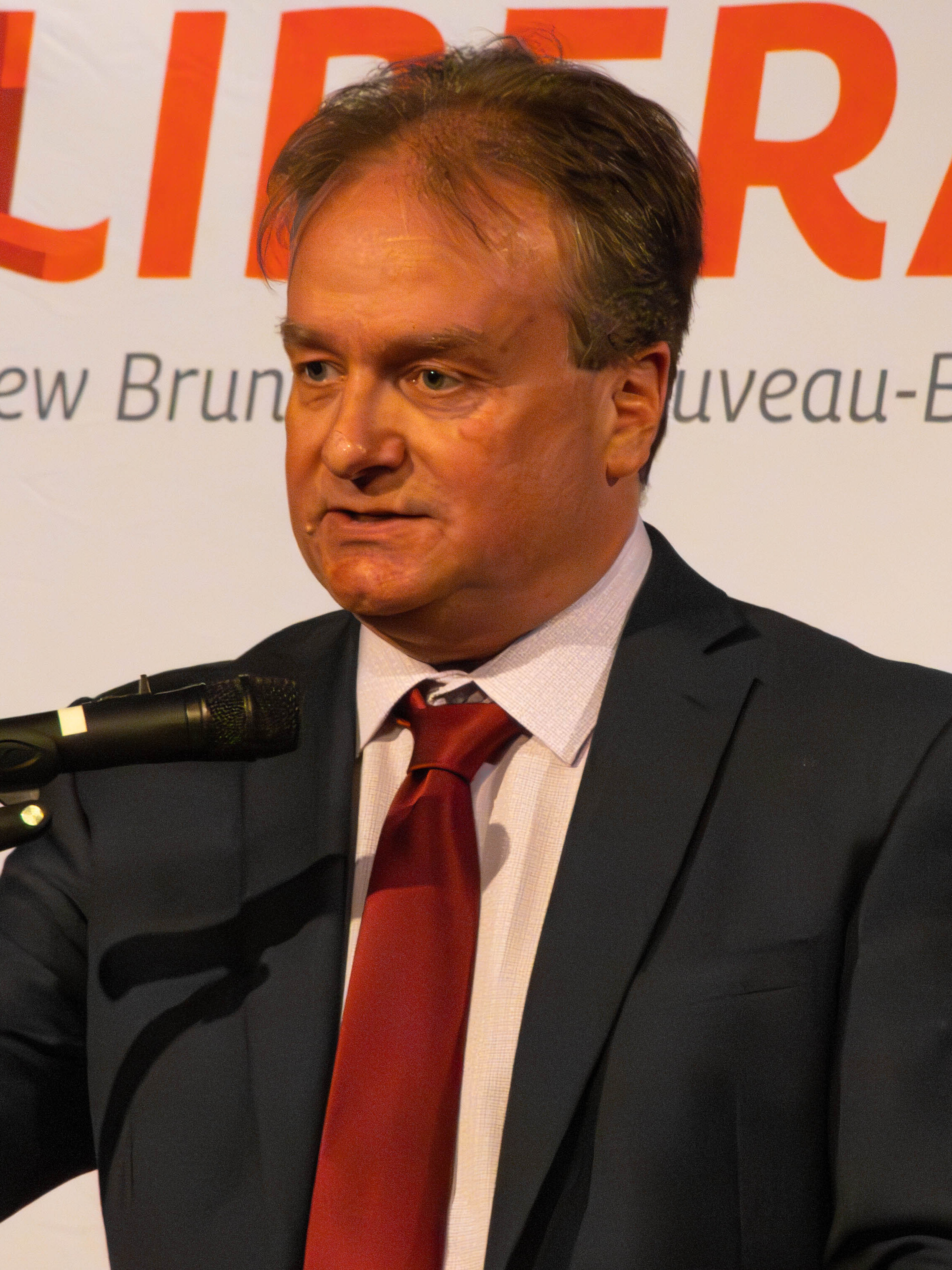
- Kennedy in 2024

Member of the New Brunswick Legislative Assembly for Quispamsis
- Incumbent
- Assumed office October 21, 2024
- Preceded by: Blaine Higgs

Personal details
- Born: 1969 or 1970 (age 55–56) Oromocto, New Brunswick
- Party: Liberal

Aaron Kennedy is a Canadian sports journalist and politician, who was elected to the Legislative Assembly of New Brunswick in the 2024 general election. He defeated Blaine Higgs in the riding of Quispamsis, who had been serving in that riding since 2010 and as Premier of New Brunswick since 2018.

Kennedy previously worked for the town of Quispamsis, where in 2011 he began serving as the town's communications manager. In July 2021, Kennedy began serving as the interim chief administrative officer; his term finished in August 2024 after his role was succeeded by a permanent hire and he pursued the Liberal nomination for the 2024 election.

== Early life and career ==
Aaron Kennedy was born in 1969 or 1970 and is originally from Oromocto, New Brunswick. He graduated from the Confederation College in Thunder Bay, Ontario, where he studied radio broadcasting. Kennedy began working as a news and sportscaster for Fredericton radio stations CIHI-FM and CKHJ before writing for the Oromocto Post-Gazette and The Daily Gleaner. In September 1994, he was hired as the voice of the Saint John Flames for the radio station CFBC, where he worked until 2000 when he was hired by the Saint John Times Globe as its American Hockey League beat reporter.

== Political career ==
Kennedy first ran for the New Brunswick Liberal Association in the riding of Quispamsis during the 2018 general election. He was defeated by Progressive Conservative leader Blaine Higgs, who became the premier of New Brunswick after the Progressive Conservatives formed government.

On June 28, 2024, Kennedy was again nominated as the Liberal candidate in the Quispamsis riding for the 2024 general election, running against Higgs again as well as provincial New Democratic Party leader Alex White. Kennedy was endorsed by Quispamsis mayor Libby O'Hara, who had a previous track record of supporting and campaigning for Higgs, and was further endorsed by former Progressive Conservative cabinet minister Brenda Fowlie. Kennedy narrowly defeated Higgs by 193 votes, in what was considered by some as being an upset. On November 1, 2024, it was announced that the new premier Susan Holt had named him to cabinet as Minister of Local Government and Minister responsible for Service New Brunswick.

== Electoral record ==
=== Quispamsis ===
2024 New Brunswick general election: Quispamsis
Party	Candidate	Votes	%	±%
Liberal	Aaron Kennedy	3,861	46.47	+29.5
Progressive Conservative	Blaine Higgs	3,668	44.15	-24.0
Green	Andrew Conradi	378	4.55	-1.8
New Democratic	Alex White	360	4.33	-1.7
Independent	David Raymond Amos	42	0.51	–
Total valid votes		8,309	99.72	
Total rejected ballots		23	0.28	
Turnout		8,332	71.93	
Eligible voters		11,584		
Liberal gain from Progressive Conservative		Swing		+26.8
Source: Elections New Brunswick

2024 New Brunswick general election
Party	Candidate	Votes	%	±%
Liberal	Aaron Kennedy	3,860	46.5	
Progressive Conservative	Blaine Higgs	3,667	44.1	
Green	Andrew Conradi	378	4.6	
New Democratic	Alex White	360	4.3	+3.09
Independent	David Raymond Amos	42	0.5	
Total valid votes		8,307		
Total rejected ballots				
Turnout				
Eligible voters				
Liberal gain		Swing		
Source: Elections New Brunswick

2018 New Brunswick general election
Party	Candidate	Votes	%	±%
Progressive Conservative	Blaine Higgs	4,691	56.87	+5.52
Liberal	Aaron Kennedy	2,078	25.19	-6.41
People's Alliance	Keith Porter	795	9.64	+8.13
Green	Mark Woolsey	445	5.40	+2.25
New Democratic	Ryan Jewkes	239	2.90	-9.50
Total valid votes		8248	100.0	
Total rejected ballots		13	0.16	
Turnout		8261	69.89	
Eligible voters		11,820		
Progressive Conservative notional gain		Swing		+5.97
Source: Elections New Brunswick
