= List of political parties in New Brunswick =

The following is a list of political parties in New Brunswick, Canada.

== Parties represented in the Legislative Assembly ==
Name	Founded	Ideology	Membership	Leader	MLAs
New Brunswick Liberal Association; Association libérale du Nouveau-Brunswick	1883	Liberalism	9,408 (2022)	Susan Holt	31 / 49
Progressive Conservative Party of New Brunswick; Parti progressiste-conservateur du Nouveau-Brunswick	1867	Conservatism	5,632 (2026)	Daniel Allain	16 / 49
Green Party of New Brunswick; Parti Vert du Nouveau-Brunswick	2008	Green politics		David Coon	2 / 49

== Other registered parties ==
Name	Founded	Ideology	Membership	Leader
Libertarian Party of New Brunswick; Parti de la Responsabilité Individuelle du Nouveau-Brunswick	2024	Localism; Libertarianism		Keith Tays
New Brunswick New Democratic Party; Nouveau Parti démocratique du Nouveau-Brunswick	1962	Social democracy	737 (2017)	Alex White
New Brunswick Now	2026			Peter Phillips

== Historical parties ==
- Anti-Confederation Party
- New Brunswick Confederation of Regions Party (1989–2002)
- Confederation Party
- Consensus NB Party (2024)
- Grey Party of New Brunswick (2002–2004)
- KISS NB (2017–2020)
- Natural Law Party of New Brunswick
- Parti Acadien 1972–1986
- People's Alliance of New Brunswick (2010–2025)
- Social Credit Party of New Brunswick
- Social Justice Party of New Brunswick (2024)
- United Farmers of New Brunswick (1921–1925)

== See also ==
- Elections New Brunswick
