= Jim Parrott =

Canadian politician

Doctor Jim Parrott

MLA for Fundy-River Valley
- In office October 12, 2010 – September 22, 2014
- Preceded by: Jack Keir
- Succeeded by: riding dissolved

Personal details
- Born: September 15, 1942 Sioux Lookout, Ontario
- Died: October 4, 2016 (aged 74) Saint John, New Brunswick
- Party: Progressive Conservative (2010–2012, 2014); Independent (2012-2014)
- Occupation: Surgeon

James Charles William Parrott (September 15, 1942 – October 4, 2016) was a Canadian politician, who was elected to the Legislative Assembly of New Brunswick in the 2010 provincial election, representing the electoral district of Fundy-River Valley. Parrott was formerly a heart surgeon.

Originally elected as a member of the Progressive Conservatives, Parrott was later removed from caucus by David Alward after criticizing the government's health care and bilingualism policies. He sat as an independent MLA for most his time in office.

On March 19, 2014, Parrott announced that he would seek the Progressive Conservative nomination in the new riding of Kings Centre for the 2014 election. On April 30, 2014, Parrott returned to the Progressive Conservative caucus. He ultimately ran in the riding of Fundy-The Isles-Saint John West, losing to incumbent MLA Rick Doucet.

On October 4, 2016, Parrott died at the age of 74 after a period of declining health.
