= Grey Party =

Grey Party may refer to:

- Grey Party of Canada
- Political colour § Grey for a general discussion of the use of the color grey by political parties
