= Riverview (electoral district) =

Provincial electoral district in New Brunswick, Canada

New Brunswick electoral district
- The riding of Riverview (as it exists from 2023) in relation to other New Brunswick electoral districts
- Coordinates: 46.051°N 64.817°W

Provincial electoral district
- Legislature: Legislative Assembly of New Brunswick
MLA
Rob Weir
Progressive Conservative
- District created: 1973
- First contested: 1974
- Last contested: 2024

Demographics
- Population (2011): 15,119
- Electors (2013): 11,399
- Census subdivision: Riverview

Riverview is a provincial electoral district for the Legislative Assembly of New Brunswick, Canada.

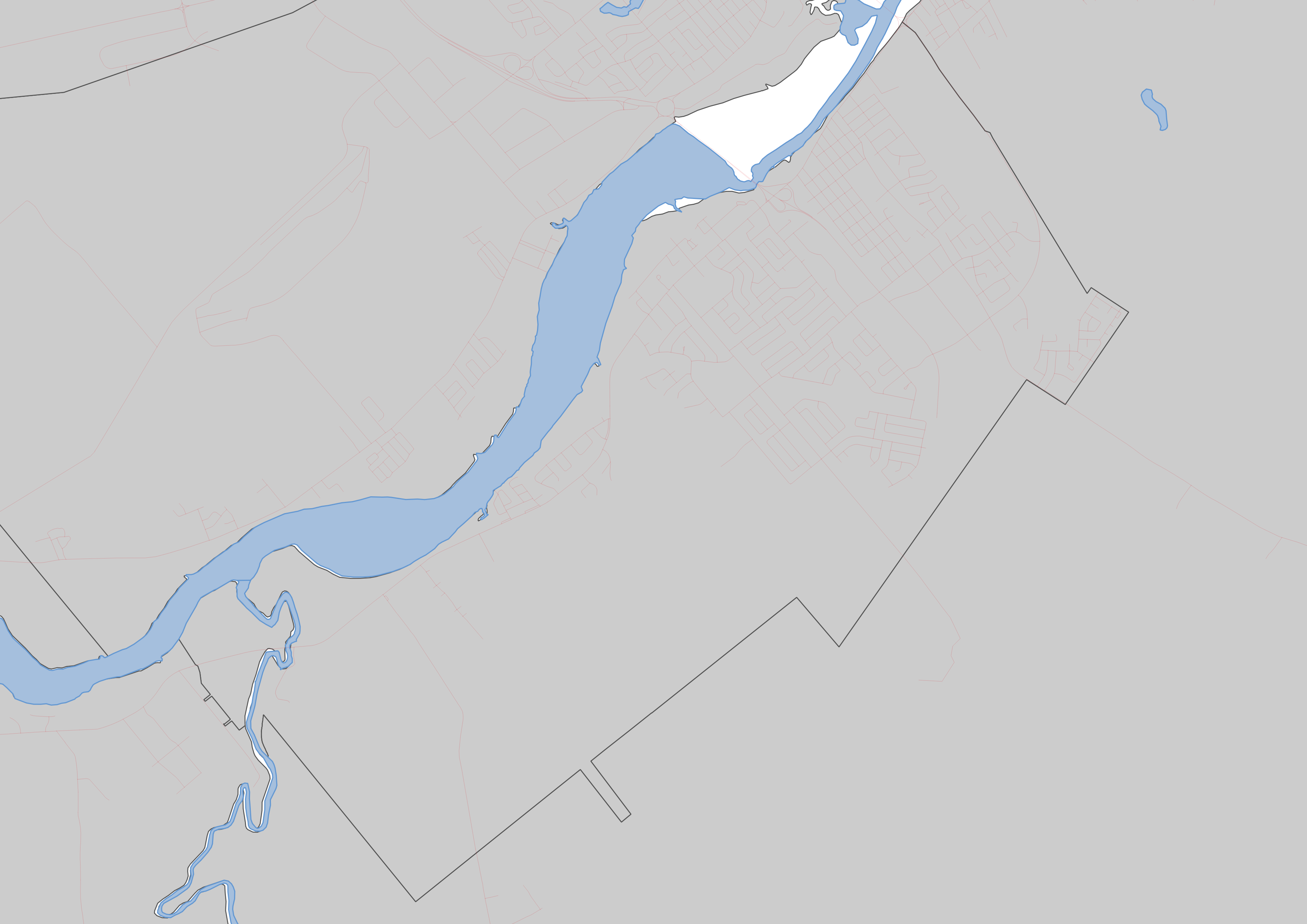
Riverview (as it exists from 2023) and the roads in the riding

== Members of the Legislative Assembly ==
Assembly	Years	Member	Party
Riding created from Albert
48th	1974–1978	Brenda Robertson	Progressive Conservative
49th	1978–1982	Brenda Robertson	Progressive Conservative
50th	1982–1984	Brenda Robertson	Progressive Conservative
50th	1985–1987	Hubert Seamans	Liberal
51st	1987–1991	Hubert Seamans	Liberal
52nd	1991–1995	Gordon Willden	Confederation of Regions
53rd	1995–1999	Al Kavanaugh	Liberal
54th	1999–2002†	Pat Crossman	Progressive Conservative
55th	2003–2006	Bruce Fitch	Progressive Conservative
56th	2006–2010	Bruce Fitch	Progressive Conservative
57th	2010–2014	Bruce Fitch	Progressive Conservative
58th	2014–2018	Bruce Fitch	Progressive Conservative
59th	2018–2020	Bruce Fitch	Progressive Conservative
60th	2020–2024	Bruce Fitch	Progressive Conservative
61st	2024–Present	Rob Weir	Progressive Conservative

† Pat Crossman died in office.

== Election results ==
2024 New Brunswick general election
Party	Candidate	Votes	%	±%
Progressive Conservative	Rob Weir	3,114	38.8%	-21.4
Liberal	Scott Grant	2,740	34.1%	+17.8
Green	Sarah Lord	1,978	24.6%	+14.3
New Democratic	Desiree Despres	128	1.6%	-1.7
Libertarian	Rebecca Mallaley	69	0.9%	
Total valid votes		8,029		
Total rejected ballots				
Turnout				
Eligible voters				
Progressive Conservative hold		Swing		
Source: Elections New Brunswick

2020 provincial election redistributed results
Party	%
Progressive Conservative	60.2
Liberal	16.3
Green	10.3
People's Alliance	10.0
New Democratic	3.3

2020 New Brunswick general election
Party	Candidate	Votes	%	±%
Progressive Conservative	Bruce Fitch	4,695	60.08	+11.06
Liberal	Heath Johnson	1,281	16.39	-10.80
Green	Rachel Pletz	800	10.24	+3.06
People's Alliance	Troy Berteit	778	9.96	-3.36
New Democratic	John Nuttall	261	3.34	+0.04
Total valid votes		7,815		
Total rejected ballots		13	0.17	-0.02
Turnout		7,828	65.99	+1.98
Eligible voters		11,863		
Progressive Conservative hold		Swing		+10.93
Source: Elections New Brunswick

2018 New Brunswick general election
Party	Candidate	Votes	%	±%
Progressive Conservative	Bruce Fitch	3,701	49.02	-3.71
Liberal	Brent Mazerolle	2,053	27.19	-2.29
People's Alliance	Heather Collins	1,005	13.31	--
Green	Stephanie Coburn	542	7.18	-0.44
New Democratic	Madison Duffy	249	3.30	-6.86
Total valid votes		7,550	100.0	
Total rejected ballots		14	0.19	
Turnout		7,564	64.00	
Eligible voters		11,818		
Source: Elections New Brunswick

2014 New Brunswick general election
Party	Candidate	Votes	%	±%
Progressive Conservative	Bruce Fitch	3,751	52.73	-10.15
Liberal	Tammy Rampersaud	2,097	29.48	+6.01
New Democratic	Danie Pitre	723	10.16	+3.55
Green	Linda Hardwick	542	7.62	+0.58
Total valid votes		7,113	100.0	
Total rejected ballots		28	0.39	
Turnout		7,141	61.84	
Eligible voters		11,547		
Progressive Conservative notional hold		Swing		-8.08
Source: Elections New Brunswick

2010 New Brunswick general election
Party	Candidate	Votes	%	±%
Progressive Conservative	Bruce Fitch	4,358	62.88	-0.46
Liberal	Lana Hansen	1,627	23.47	-10.23
Green	Steven Steeves	488	7.04	–
New Democratic	Darryl Pitre	458	6.61	+3.65
Total valid votes		6,931	100.0	
Total rejected ballots		41	0.59	
Turnout		6,972	65.15	
Eligible voters		10,702		
Progressive Conservative hold		Swing		+4.88
Source: Elections New Brunswick

2006 New Brunswick general election
Party	Candidate	Votes	%	±%
Progressive Conservative	Bruce Fitch	4,326	63.34	+12.56
Liberal	Ward White	2,302	33.70	-10.29
New Democratic	Richard Grant	202	2.96	-2.27
Total valid votes		6,830	100.0	
Progressive Conservative hold		Swing		+11.42
Source: Elections New Brunswick

2003 New Brunswick general election
Party	Candidate	Votes	%	±%
Progressive Conservative	Bruce Fitch	3,794	50.78	-6.90
Liberal	Ward White	3,287	43.99	+16.04
New Democratic	John Falconer	391	5.23	-6.31
Total valid votes		7,472	100.0	
Progressive Conservative hold		Swing		-11.47
Source: Elections New Brunswick

1999 New Brunswick general election
Party	Candidate	Votes	%	±%
Progressive Conservative	Pat Crossman	4,439	57.68	+35.02
Liberal	Al J. Kavanaugh	2,151	27.95	-26.19
New Democratic	Brad Smith	888	11.54	+7.34
Confederation of Regions	Shane Harvey	278	3.61	-15.40
Independent	Jamie Ed Borden	81	1.05	–
Total valid votes		7,696	100.0	
Progressive Conservative gain from Liberal		Swing		+30.60
Source: Elections New Brunswick

1995 New Brunswick general election
Party	Candidate	Votes	%	±%
Liberal	Al Kavanaugh	4,090	54.14	+19.27
Progressive Conservative	Scott MacGregor	1,712	22.66	-0.67
Confederation of Regions	Doug Roper	1,436	19.01	-16.13
New Democratic	David Bailie	317	4.20	-2.45
Total valid votes		7,555	100.0	
Liberal gain from Confederation of Regions		Swing		+9.97
Source: Elections New Brunswick

1991 New Brunswick general election
Party	Candidate	Votes	%	±%
Confederation of Regions	Gordon B. Willden	3,139	35.14	–
Liberal	Hubert Seamans	3,115	34.87	-30.68
Progressive Conservative	Ross MacCallum	2,084	23.33	-1.17
New Democratic	Wayne Brown	594	6.65	-3.31
Total valid votes		8,932	100.0	
Confederation of Regions gain from Liberal		Swing		+32.91
Source: Elections New Brunswick

1987 New Brunswick general election
Party	Candidate	Votes	%	±%
Liberal	Hubert Seamans	5,357	65.55	+11.17
Progressive Conservative	Dave Richardson	2,002	24.50	-0.93
New Democratic	Terry Boudreau	814	9.96	-6.18
Total valid votes		8,173	100.0	
Liberal hold		Swing		+6.05
Source: Elections New Brunswick

New Brunswick provincial by-election, 1985 on the appointment of Brenda Robertson to the Senate, 21 December 1984
Party	Candidate	Votes	%	±%
Liberal	Hubert Seamans	4,230	54.38	+26.38
Progressive Conservative	Scott "Skip" MacGregor	1,978	25.43	-38.99
New Democratic	Dorothy MacCurdy	1,255	16.14	+8.56
Independent	Francis L. Brown	276	3.55	–
Independent	J.R. Gallant	39	0.50	–
Total valid votes		7,778	100.0	
Liberal gain from Progressive Conservative		Swing		+32.68
Source: Elections New Brunswick

1982 New Brunswick general election
Party	Candidate	Votes	%	±%
Progressive Conservative	Brenda M. Robertson	4,949	64.42	-4.89
Liberal	Jim Anderson	2,151	28.00	-2.69
New Democratic	Ed Foley	582	7.58	–
Total valid votes		7,682	100.0	
Progressive Conservative hold		Swing		-1.10
Source: Elections New Brunswick

1978 New Brunswick general election
Party	Candidate	Votes	%	±%
Progressive Conservative	Brenda M. Robertson	4,443	69.31	+14.59
Liberal	W. A. "Bill" Payne	1,967	30.69	-6.76
Total valid votes		6,410	100.0	
Progressive Conservative hold		Swing		+10.67
Source: Elections New Brunswick

1974 New Brunswick general election
Party	Candidate	Votes	%
Progressive Conservative	Brenda M. Robertson	3,001	54.72
Liberal	Edgar W. Mitton	2,054	37.45
Independent	George Albert Cameron	324	5.91
New Democratic	Bernice Mary Torrance	105	1.91
Total valid votes		5,484	100.0
The previous multi-member riding of Albert went totally Progressive Conservative in the last election, with Brenda Robertson being one of the two incumbents.
Source: Elections New Brunswick

== See also ==
- List of New Brunswick provincial electoral districts
- Canadian provincial electoral districts
