= Bruce Fitch =

Canadian politician

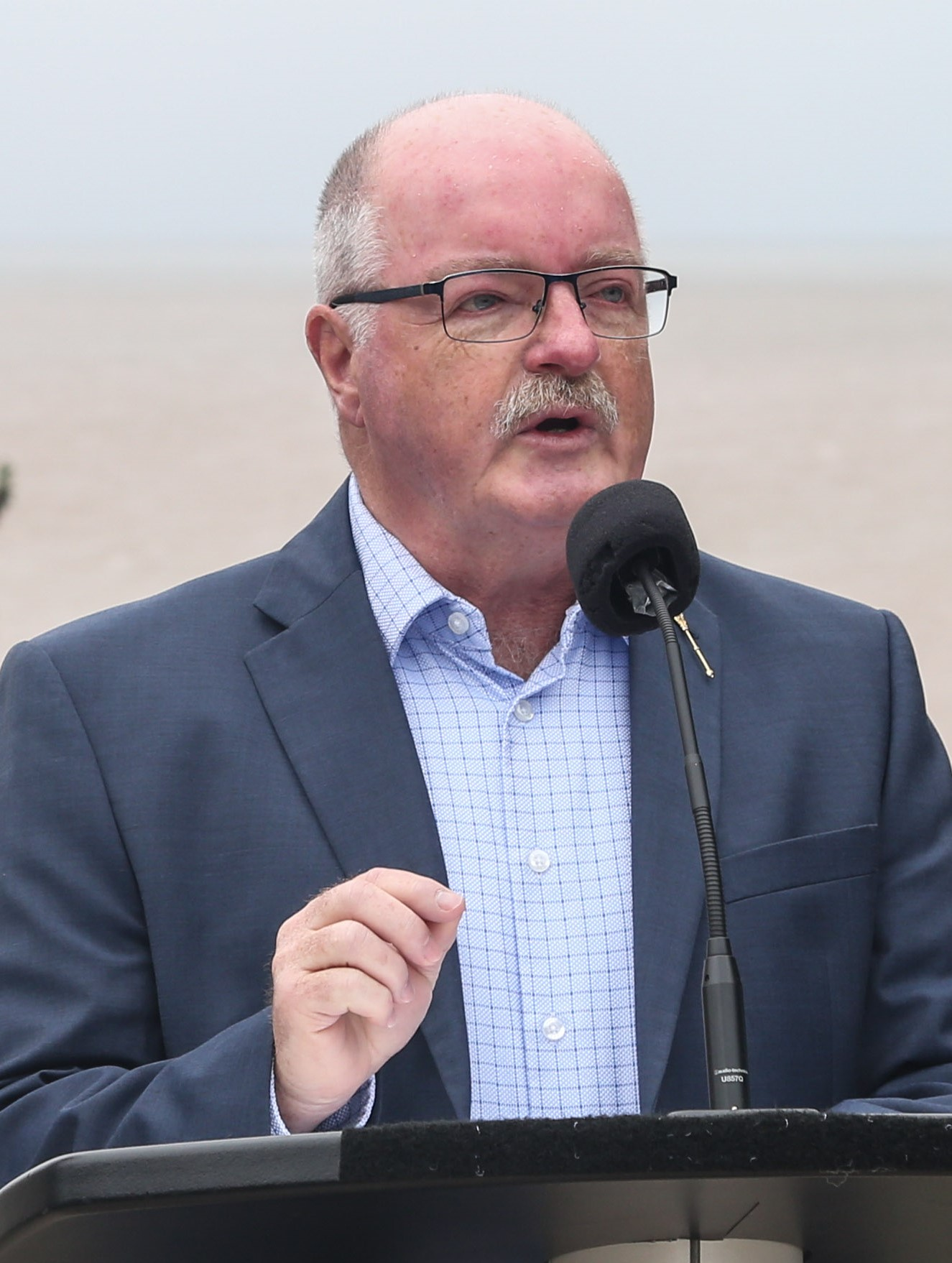
- Fitch in 2020

Minister of Health
- In office July 15, 2022 – November 2, 2024
- Preceded by: Dorothy Shephard
- Succeeded by: John Dornan

Minister of Social Development
- In office September 29, 2020 – July 15, 2022
- Preceded by: Dorothy Shephard
- Succeeded by: Dorothy Shephard

Minister of Tourism, Heritage and Culture
- In office February 24, 2020 – September 29, 2020
- Preceded by: Robert Gauvin
- Succeeded by: Tammy Scott-Wallace

Leader of the Opposition (New Brunswick)
- In office October 18, 2014 – October 22, 2016
- Preceded by: Brian Gallant
- Succeeded by: Blaine Higgs

Interim Leader of the Progressive Conservative Party of New Brunswick
- In office October 18, 2014 – October 22, 2016
- Preceded by: David Alward
- Succeeded by: Blaine Higgs

Minister of Local Government
- In office October 12, 2010 – October 12, 2014
- Preceded by: Chris Collins
- Succeeded by: Brian Kenny

Minister responsible for Service New Brunswick
- In office October 12, 2010 – September 22, 2014
- Preceded by: Victor Boudreau
- Succeeded by: Ed Doherty

Minister of Justice and Consumer Affairs
- In office February 14, 2006 – September 18, 2006
- Preceded by: Position established
- Succeeded by: T. J. Burke

Minister of Energy
- In office June 27, 2003 – February 14, 2006
- Preceded by: Jeannot Volpé
- Succeeded by: Brenda Fowlie

Member of the Legislative Assembly of New Brunswick for Riverview
- In office June 9, 2003 – September 19, 2024
- Preceded by: Pat Crossman
- Succeeded by: Rob Weir

Mayor of Riverview
- In office May 11, 1998 – 2003
- Preceded by: David Richardson
- Succeeded by: Clarence Sweetland

Dean of the Legislative Assembly of New Brunswick
- In office April 30, 2024 – September 19, 2024
- Preceded by: Trevor Holder
- Succeeded by: Sherry Wilson

Personal details
- Born: Ralph Bruce Fitch; 1958 or 1959 (age 67–68) Moncton, New Brunswick, Canada
- Party: Progressive Conservative
- Occupation: Politician

Ralph Bruce Fitch (born c. 1958) is a former Canadian politician. He represented Riverview in the Legislative Assembly of New Brunswick from 2003 until 2024.

== Early life ==
Born in Moncton, New Brunswick, he is the son of Dr. Ralph Fitch. In 1980, he graduated with a Bachelor of Science degree in Biology from Mount Allison University. His career in the private sector was in the insurance and financial industries. He worked with Scotiabank and its brokerage firm ScotiaMcLeod for many years prior to his election to the legislature.

== Political career ==
He was first involved in politics when he was elected in 1989 to the municipal council of the Town of Riverview. He was re-elected to that position in 1992 and 1995 before successfully running for mayor in 1998. He was re-elected mayor in 2001 and served in that capacity until his election to the legislature in the 2003 provincial election. Fitch was the only non-incumbent Progressive Conservative to win a seat in that election and was immediately named to cabinet as Minister of Energy. He was shuffled to the new Justice and Consumer Affairs portfolio on February 14, 2006 despite having no legal training; this was made possible by disassociating the functions of the Office of the Attorney General from the Justice Department.

He is a member of the First Baptist Church. His hobbies include sailboarding and golf. An ardent fan and supporter of minor sports, he is frequently seen on the sidelines of his children’s games. He also coached minor soccer and football in the past.

He has been involved in the community for many years. He has been a member of many boards and committees, including Codiac Regional Police Board, Lakeview Manor Senior Citizens Home, and the Atlantic Baptist University.

On October 18, 2014 after the Progressive Conservative Party under David Alward failed to form government, Fitch was made interim leader of the Progressive Conservative Party and Leader of the Opposition of New Brunswick.

Fitch was re-elected in the 2018 and 2020 provincial elections. On April 5, 2024, he announced that he would not be seeking re-election during the 2024 provincial election.

== Electoral record ==
=== Riverview ===
2020 New Brunswick general election
Party	Candidate	Votes	%	±%
Progressive Conservative	Bruce Fitch	4,695	60.08	+11.06
Liberal	Heath Johnson	1,281	16.39	-10.80
Green	Rachel Pletz	800	10.24	+3.06
People's Alliance	Troy Berteit	778	9.96	-3.36
New Democratic	John Nuttall	261	3.34	+0.04
Total valid votes		7,815		
Total rejected ballots		13	0.17	-0.02
Turnout		7,828	65.99	+1.98
Eligible voters		11,863		
Progressive Conservative hold		Swing		+10.93
Source: Elections New Brunswick

2018 New Brunswick general election
Party	Candidate	Votes	%	±%
Progressive Conservative	Bruce Fitch	3,701	49.02	-3.71
Liberal	Brent Mazerolle	2,053	27.19	-2.29
People's Alliance	Heather Collins	1,005	13.31	--
Green	Stephanie Coburn	542	7.18	-0.44
New Democratic	Madison Duffy	249	3.30	-6.86
Total valid votes		7,550	100.0	
Total rejected ballots		14	0.19	
Turnout		7,564	64.00	
Eligible voters		11,818		
Source: Elections New Brunswick

2014 New Brunswick general election
Party	Candidate	Votes	%	±%
Progressive Conservative	Bruce Fitch	3,751	52.73	-10.15
Liberal	Tammy Rampersaud	2,097	29.48	+6.01
New Democratic	Danie Pitre	723	10.16	+3.55
Green	Linda Hardwick	542	7.62	+0.58
Total valid votes		7,113	100.0	
Total rejected ballots		28	0.39	
Turnout		7,141	61.84	
Eligible voters		11,547		
Progressive Conservative notional hold		Swing		-8.08
Source: Elections New Brunswick

2010 New Brunswick general election
Party	Candidate	Votes	%	±%
Progressive Conservative	Bruce Fitch	4,358	62.88	-0.46
Liberal	Lana Hansen	1,627	23.47	-10.23
Green	Steven Steeves	488	7.04	–
New Democratic	Darryl Pitre	458	6.61	+3.65
Total valid votes		6,931	100.0	
Total rejected ballots		41	0.59	
Turnout		6,972	65.15	
Eligible voters		10,702		
Progressive Conservative hold		Swing		+4.88
Source: Elections New Brunswick

2006 New Brunswick general election
Party	Candidate	Votes	%	±%
Progressive Conservative	Bruce Fitch	4,326	63.34	+12.56
Liberal	Ward White	2,302	33.70	-10.29
New Democratic	Richard Grant	202	2.96	-2.27
Total valid votes		6,830	100.0	
Progressive Conservative hold		Swing		+11.42
Source: Elections New Brunswick

2003 New Brunswick general election
Party	Candidate	Votes	%	±%
Progressive Conservative	Bruce Fitch	3,794	50.78	-6.90
Liberal	Ward White	3,287	43.99	+16.04
New Democratic	John Falconer	391	5.23	-6.31
Total valid votes		7,472	100.0	
Progressive Conservative hold		Swing		-11.47
Source: Elections New Brunswick

New Brunswick provincial government of Blaine Higgs
Cabinet post (1)
Predecessor	Office	Successor
Robert Gauvin	Minister of Tourism, Heritage and Culture; February 21, 2020–	
