= Mary Schryer =

Canadian politician

Member of the New Brunswick Legislative Assembly for Quispamsis
- In office September 18, 2006 – September 27, 2010
- Preceded by: Brenda Fowlie
- Succeeded by: Blaine Higgs

Personal details
- Party: Liberal
- Spouse: Scott
- Occupation: financial planner, sales manager, politician

Mary Schryer is a Canadian politician who was formerly a Member of the Legislative Assembly (MLA) in New Brunswick, Canada, representing the constituency of Quispamsis. A member of the Liberal Party of New Brunswick, Schryer was elected in the September 18, 2006 general election for the Legislative Assembly of New Brunswick. She lost her riding in the September 27, 2010 election.

Prior to the election, Schryer was a financial planner and sales manager with Clarica, part of Sun Life Financial, in Quispamsis, New Brunswick, a director of the area's health services corporation and a member of the town council.

She was named to the cabinet on October 3, 2006.

New Brunswick provincial government of Shawn Graham
Cabinet posts (2)
Predecessor	Office	Successor
Mike Murphy	Minister of Health; 2009–2010	Madeleine Dube
Carmel Robichaud	Minister of Social Development; 2007–2009 styled as Minister of Family & Community Services from Oct.–Dec. 2007	Kelly Lamrock
Special Cabinet Responsibilities
Predecessor	Title	Successor
Carmel Robichaud	Minister responsible for the Status of Women; 2007–2010	Margaret-Ann Blaney
Eugene McGinley	Minister responsible for the Housing; 2008–2009; McGinley was 'Minister of State for Housing'	Kelly Lamrock
none	Minister of State for Housing; 2006–2007 new designation McGinley was sworn-in as "Minister of State for Seniors and Housing"	Eugene McGinley
Madeleine Dubé	Minister of State for Seniors; 2006–2007; Dubé was Minister responsible for Seniors; McGinley was sworn-in as "Minister of State for Seniors and Housing"	Eugene McGinley
