= Quispamsis (electoral district) =

Provincial electoral district in New Brunswick, Canada

New Brunswick electoral district
- The riding of Quispamsis (as it exists from 2023) in relation to other New Brunswick electoral districts
- Coordinates: 45.429°N 65.935°W

Provincial electoral district
- Legislature: Legislative Assembly of New Brunswick
MLA
Aaron Kennedy
Liberal
- District created: 1994
- First contested: 1995
- Last contested: 2024

Demographics
- Population (2011): 16,063
- Electors (2013): 11,290
- Census subdivision: Quispamsis

Quispamsis is a provincial electoral district for the Legislative Assembly of New Brunswick, Canada.

It was created as Kennebecasis in 1994 and included the town of Quispamsis and surrounding communities along the Kennebecasis River Valley. The district was reduced in size following the 2006 electoral redistribution such that only the Town of Quispamsis were within it so its name was changed to reflect that. Quispamsis means little lake in the woods.

The district was relatively unchanged following the 2013 electoral redistribution, losing only some of its eastern polls to Hampton.

The former Premier and leader of the Progressive Conservative Party of New Brunswick, Blaine Higgs, represented Quispamsis. Higgs was re-elected in this district in 2014, 2018, and 2020. Higgs was defeated in the 2024 election.

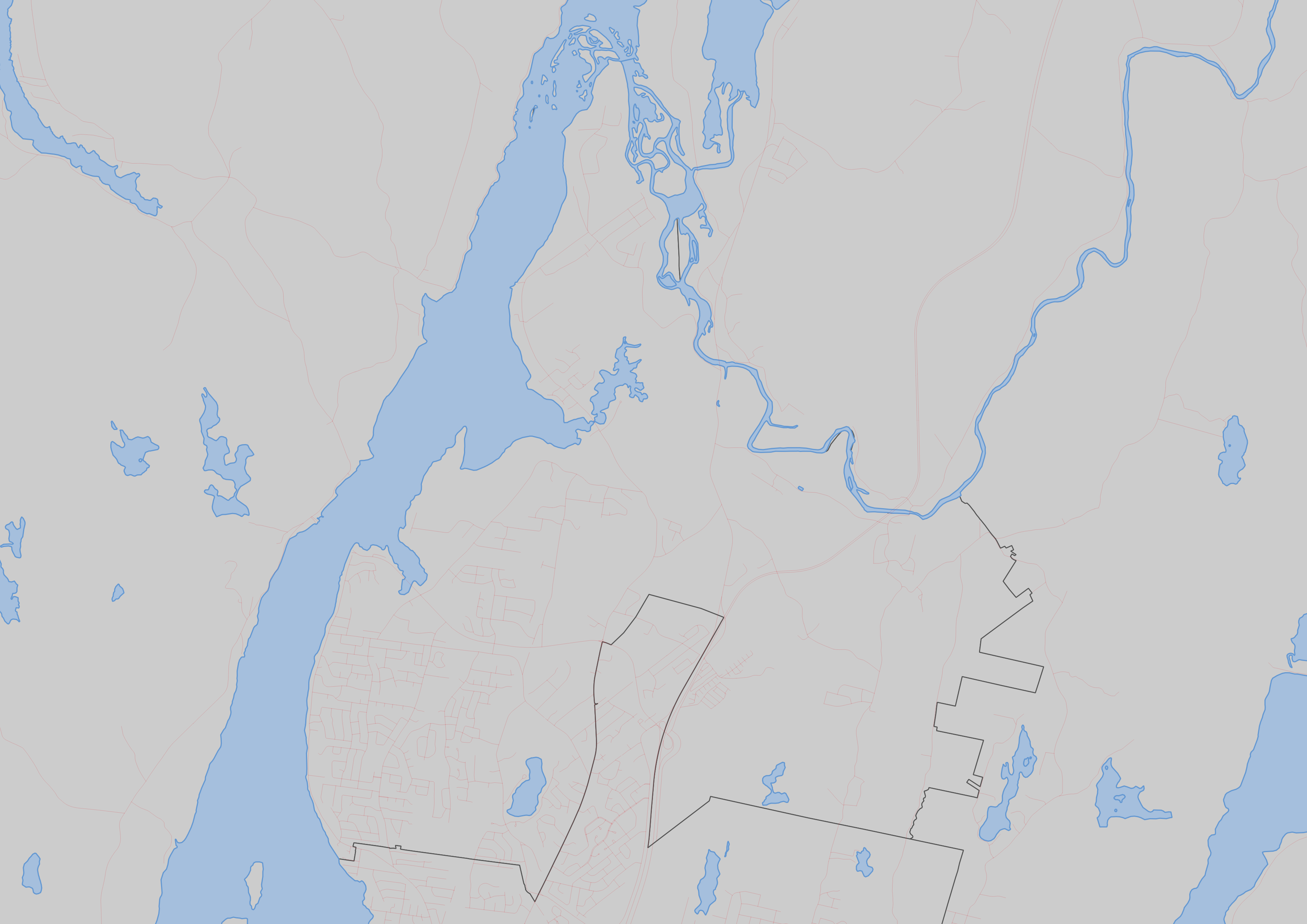
Quispamsis (as it exists from 2023) and the roads in the riding

== Members of the Legislative Assembly ==
Assembly	Years	Member	Party
Kennebecasis; Riding created from Kings West
53rd	1995–1999	Peter LeBlanc	Liberal
54th	1999–2003	Brenda Fowlie	Progressive Conservative
55th	2003–2006	Brenda Fowlie	Progressive Conservative
Quispamsis
56th	2006–2010	Mary Schryer	Liberal
57th	2010–2014	Blaine Higgs	Progressive Conservative
58th	2014–2018	Blaine Higgs	Progressive Conservative
59th	2018–2020	Blaine Higgs	Progressive Conservative
60th	2020–2024	Blaine Higgs	Progressive Conservative
61st	2024–Present	Aaron Kennedy	Liberal

== Election results ==
=== Quispamsis ===
2024 New Brunswick general election
Party	Candidate	Votes	%	±%
Liberal	Aaron Kennedy	3,861	46.47	+29.5
Progressive Conservative	Blaine Higgs	3,668	44.15	-24.0
Green	Andrew Conradi	378	4.55	-1.8
New Democratic	Alex White	360	4.33	-1.7
Independent	David Raymond Amos	42	0.51	–
Total valid votes		8,309	99.72	
Total rejected ballots		23	0.28	
Turnout		8,332	71.93	
Eligible voters		11,584		
Liberal gain from Progressive Conservative		Swing		+26.8
Source: Elections New Brunswick

2020 provincial election redistributed results
Party	%
Progressive Conservative	67.1
Liberal	14.5
Green	6.7
New Democratic	6.2
People's Alliance	5.5

2020 New Brunswick general election
Party	Candidate	Votes	%	±%
Progressive Conservative	Blaine Higgs	5,697	68.11	+11.23
Liberal	Robert Hunt	1,225	14.64	-10.55
Green	Addison Fach	528	6.31	+0.92
New Democratic	Caitlin Grogan	501	5.99	+3.09
People's Alliance	Sara Hall	414	4.95	-4.69
Total valid votes		8,365		
Total rejected ballots		24	0.29	+0.13
Turnout		8,389	69.86	+1.69
Eligible voters		12,008		
Progressive Conservative hold		Swing		+10.89
Source: Elections New Brunswick

2018 New Brunswick general election
Party	Candidate	Votes	%	±%
Progressive Conservative	Blaine Higgs	4,691	56.87	+5.52
Liberal	Aaron Kennedy	2,078	25.19	-6.41
People's Alliance	Keith Porter	795	9.64	+8.13
Green	Mark Woolsey	445	5.40	+2.25
New Democratic	Ryan Jewkes	239	2.90	-9.50
Total valid votes		8,248	100.0	
Total rejected ballots		13	0.16	
Turnout		8,261	68.179	
Eligible voters		12,118		
Progressive Conservative hold		Swing		+5.97
Source: Elections New Brunswick

2014 New Brunswick general election
Party	Candidate	Votes	%	±%
Progressive Conservative	Blaine Higgs	3,884	51.35	+0.68
Liberal	Mary Schryer	2,390	31.60	-2.61
New Democratic	Angela-Jo "AJ" Griffin	938	12.40	+0.99
Green	Patrick Kemp	238	3.15	-0.55
People's Alliance	Brandon Gardner	114	1.51	–
Total valid votes		7,564	100.0	
Total rejected ballots		19	0.25	
Turnout		7,583	64.76	
Eligible voters		11,710		
Progressive Conservative notional hold		Swing		+1.64
Source: Elections New Brunswick

2010 New Brunswick general election
Party	Candidate	Votes	%	±%
Progressive Conservative	Blaine Higgs	4,076	50.67	+6.69
Liberal	Mary Schryer	2,752	34.21	-17.08
New Democratic	Matthew Doherty	918	11.41	+6.68
Green	Mark Woolsey	298	3.70	–
Total valid votes		8,044	100.0	
Total rejected ballots		30	0.37	
Turnout		8,074	69.29	
Eligible voters		11,652		
Progressive Conservative gain from Liberal		Swing		+11.88
Source: Elections New Brunswick

2006 New Brunswick general election
Party	Candidate	Votes	%	±%
Liberal	Mary Schryer	3,625	51.29	+7.89
Progressive Conservative	Brenda Fowlie	3,108	43.98	+0.34
New Democratic	Lorena Henry	334	4.73	-8.23
Total valid votes		7,067	100.0	
Liberal gain from Progressive Conservative		Swing		+3.78
Source: Elections New Brunswick

=== Kennebecasis ===
2003 New Brunswick general election
Party	Candidate	Votes	%	±%
Progressive Conservative	Brenda Fowlie	3,265	43.64	-9.99
Liberal	Murray Driscoll	3,247	43.40	+11.93
New Democratic	Kenneth Wilcox	970	12.96	+0.59
Total valid votes		7,482	100.0	
Progressive Conservative hold		Swing		-10.96

1999 New Brunswick general election
Party	Candidate	Votes	%	±%
Progressive Conservative	Brenda Fowlie	4,070	53.63	+25.45
Liberal	Peter LeBlanc	2,388	31.47	-13.20
New Democratic	Albert Charles Joseph Comeau	939	12.37	-8.36
Confederation of Regions	Greg Boyle	192	2.53	-3.89
Total valid votes		7,589	100.0	
Progressive Conservative gain from Liberal		Swing		+19.32

1995 New Brunswick general election
Party	Candidate	Votes	%	±%
Liberal	Peter LeBlanc	3,279	44.67	
Progressive Conservative	John van Kralingen	2,069	28.18	
New Democratic	Elizabeth Thompson	1,522	20.73	
Confederation of Regions	Bob Ross	471	6.42	
Total valid votes		7,341	100.0	

== See also ==
- List of New Brunswick provincial electoral districts
- Canadian provincial electoral districts
