= Rob Weir =

Canadian politician from New Brunswick

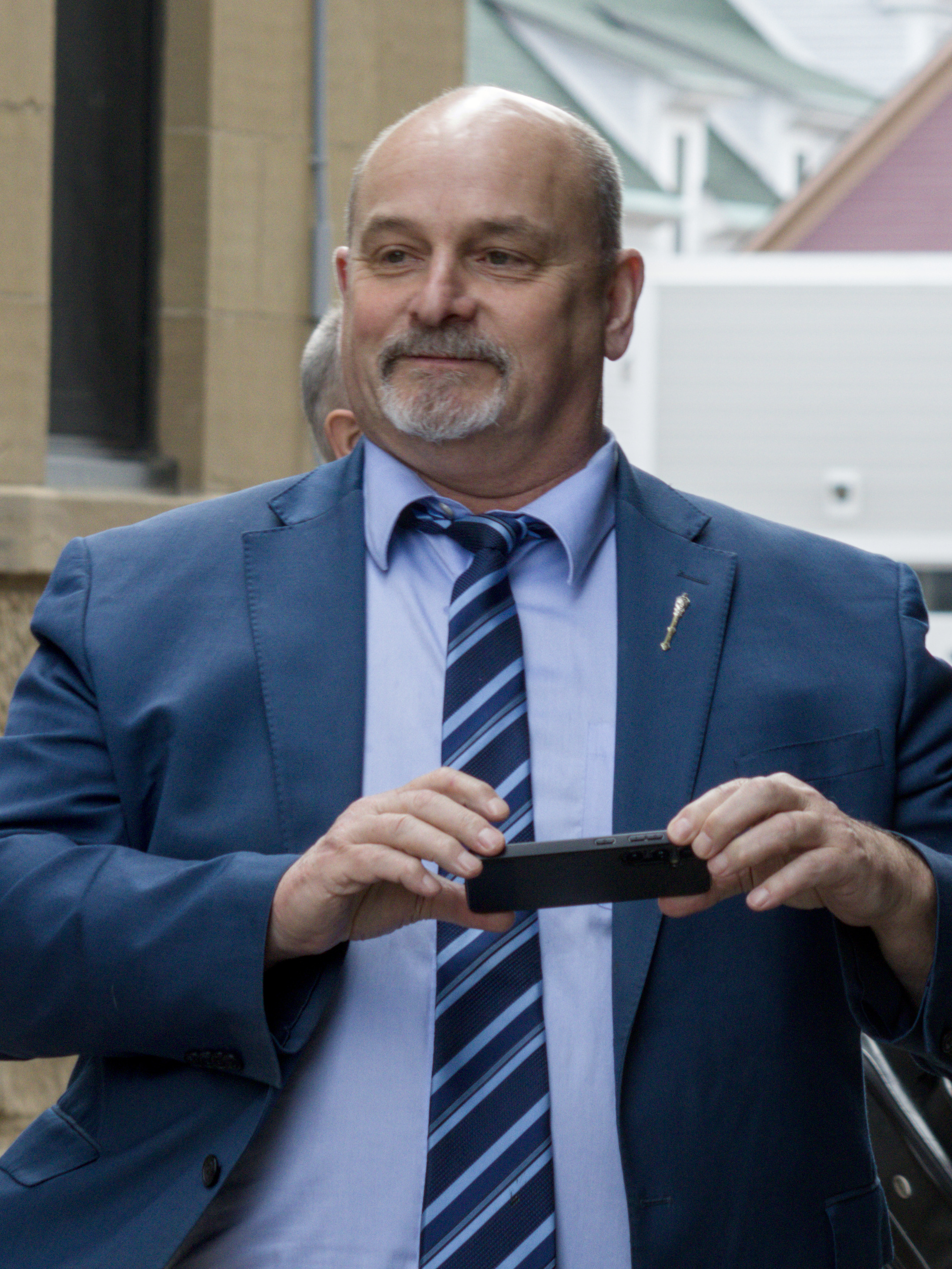
- Weir in 2026

Member of the New Brunswick Legislative Assembly for Riverview
- Incumbent
- Assumed office October 21, 2024
- Preceded by: Bruce Fitch

Personal details
- Party: Progressive Conservative

Rob Weir is a Canadian politician, who was elected to the Legislative Assembly of New Brunswick in the 2024 election. He was elected in the riding of Riverview.

== Electoral record ==
2024 New Brunswick general election: Riverview
Party	Candidate	Votes	%	±%
Progressive Conservative	Rob Weir	3,114	38.8%	-21.4
Liberal	Scott Grant	2,740	34.1%	+17.8
Green	Sarah Lord	1,978	24.6%	+14.3
New Democratic	Desiree Despres	128	1.6%	-1.7
Libertarian	Rebecca Mallaley	69	0.9%	
Total valid votes		8,029		
Total rejected ballots				
Turnout				
Eligible voters				
Progressive Conservative hold		Swing		
Source: Elections New Brunswick
