= Department of Energy and Mines (New Brunswick) =

Government agency

The Department of Energy and Mines is a part of the Government of New Brunswick. It is charged with the administration of New Brunswick's energy policy including electricity, natural gas and refined petroleum products; as well as the regulation of the development and exploration of minerals from New Brunswick's land.

The department was established as the Department of Energy on June 27, 2003 when it was separated from the former Department of Natural Resources and Energy. In October 2012, it added further responsibilities from Natural Resources governing mines and minerals and its name was changed accordingly.

In a 2016 cabinet shuffle, the Department of Natural Resources and Department of Energy and Mines rejoined to form the new Department of Energy and Resource Development.

== Ministers ==
#	Minister	Term	Government
Minister of Energy
1.	Bruce Fitch	June 27, 2003 - February 14, 2006	under Bernard Lord
2.	Brenda Fowlie	February 14, 2006 - October 3, 2006	under Bernard Lord
3.	Jack Keir	October 3, 2006 - September 27, 2010	under Shawn Graham
4.	Craig Leonard	October 12, 2010 - March 15, 2012	under David Alward
5.	Margaret-Ann Blaney	March 15, 2012 - June 4, 2012	under David Alward
6.	Craig Leonard (acting)	June 4, 2012 - October 9, 2012	under David Alward
Minister of Energy and Mines
7.	Craig Leonard (second time)	October 9, 2012 – October 7, 2014	under Alward
8.	Donald Arseneault	October 7, 2014 – June 6, 2016	under Brian Gallant
Merged with Department of Natural Resources
