= Alyson Townsend =

Canadian politician

Minister of Post-Secondary Education, Training and Labour
- Incumbent
- Assumed office November 2, 2024
- Premier: Susan Holt
- Preceded by: Greg Turner

Minister responsible for the Research and Productivity Council
- Incumbent
- Assumed office November 2, 2024
- Premier: Susan Holt
- Preceded by: Bill Hogan

Minister responsible for the Regulatory Accountability and Reporting Act
- Incumbent
- Assumed office November 2, 2024
- Premier: Susan Holt
- Preceded by: Bill Hogan

Member of the New Brunswick Legislative Assembly for Rothesay
- Incumbent
- Assumed office October 21, 2024
- Preceded by: Ted Flemming

Personal details
- Party: Liberal

Alyson Townsend is a Canadian politician, who was elected to the Legislative Assembly of New Brunswick in the 2024 election. She was elected in the riding of Rothesay. On November 1, 2024, it was announced that she was placed on the cabinet as Minister of Post-Secondary Education, Training and Labour, Minister responsible for the Research and Productivity Council, and Minister responsible for the Regulatory Accountability and Reporting Act.

On February 3, 2025, Townsend announced that she had been diagnosed with a brain tumor and would be temporarily stepping down from her cabinet position to undergo surgery and medical treatment.

== Electoral record ==
2024 New Brunswick general election: Rothesay
Party	Candidate	Votes	%	±%
Liberal	Alyson Townsend	4,085	50.48	+30.7
Progressive Conservative	Ted Flemming	3,373	41.68	-22.5
Green	Zara MacKay-Boyce	549	6.78	-2.3
Libertarian	Austin Venedam	85	1.05	
Total valid votes		8,092	99.90	
Total rejected ballots		8	0.10	
Turnout		8,100	70.79	
Eligible voters		11,442		
Liberal gain from Progressive Conservative		Swing		+26.6
Source: Elections New Brunswick
