= Jack Keir =

Canadian politician

Member of the New Brunswick Legislative Assembly for Fundy-River Valley
- In office September 18, 2006 – September 27, 2010
- Preceded by: Milt Sherwood
- Succeeded by: Jim Parrott

Personal details
- Born: 1957 or 1958 (age 68–69)
- Party: Liberal

Jack Keir is a former politician who was elected to the Legislative Assembly of New Brunswick to represent the electoral district of Fundy-River Valley in the 2006 election. A member of the New Brunswick Liberal Association, which formed the government, he was shortly thereafter named to the cabinet of Shawn Graham.

== See also ==
- Proposed sale of NB Power

New Brunswick provincial government of Shawn Graham
Cabinet posts (2)
Predecessor	Office	Successor
Brenda Fowlie	Minister of Energy; 2006–2010	Craig Leonard
Roly MacIntyre	Minister of Supply and Services (acting); 2008	Ed Doherty
Special Cabinet Responsibilities
Predecessor	Title	Successor
Brenda Fowlie	Minister responsible for the Energy Efficiency and Conservation Agency; 2006–2010	Craig Leonard
