= Peter LeBlanc =

Peter LeBlanc may refer to:

- Peter LeBlanc (ice hockey)
- Peter LeBlanc (politician)
