= Hugh Flemming =

Hugh Flemming may refer to:

- Hugh John Flemming, (1899–1982), the 24th Premier of New Brunswick
- Hugh John Flemming III, birth name of Ted Flemming (politician), New Brunswick's Minister of Health (2012–2014) and a current MLA in the provincial legislature
