= Manitoba Grey Party =

- Leader: Lou Hemming
- Founded: 2002
- Dissolved: 2003
- Split from: Grey Party of Canada
- Headquarters: Manitoba
- Ideology: Elder rights

The Manitoba Grey Party was a political party in Manitoba, Canada, focusing on senior's issues. The party appears to have been founded in 2002, at the same time as the Grey Party of Canada and other provincial Grey Parties.

The national party was formed to address the health needs of seniors, and was particularly concerned with the high cost of prescription drugs. The party also promoted a "right-wing populist" ideology on other issues, claiming that Canada's legal profession held too much sway over government policy. It is likely that the provincial party advocated similar positions.

The Grey Party may have attempted to register with Elections Manitoba before the 2003 provincial election, though it appears this was unsuccessful, as there is no record of official registration or candidates under that name for that election.

The collapse of the Grey Party of Canada in late 2003 was noted in contemporary reports and political commentary, with the party failing to achieve federal registration or sustainable membership. There is no record of continued operation of the Manitoba chapter thereafter.

The Manitoba Grey Party's first (and perhaps only) leader was Lou Hemming.
