= Alex White (Canadian politician) =

Canadian politician

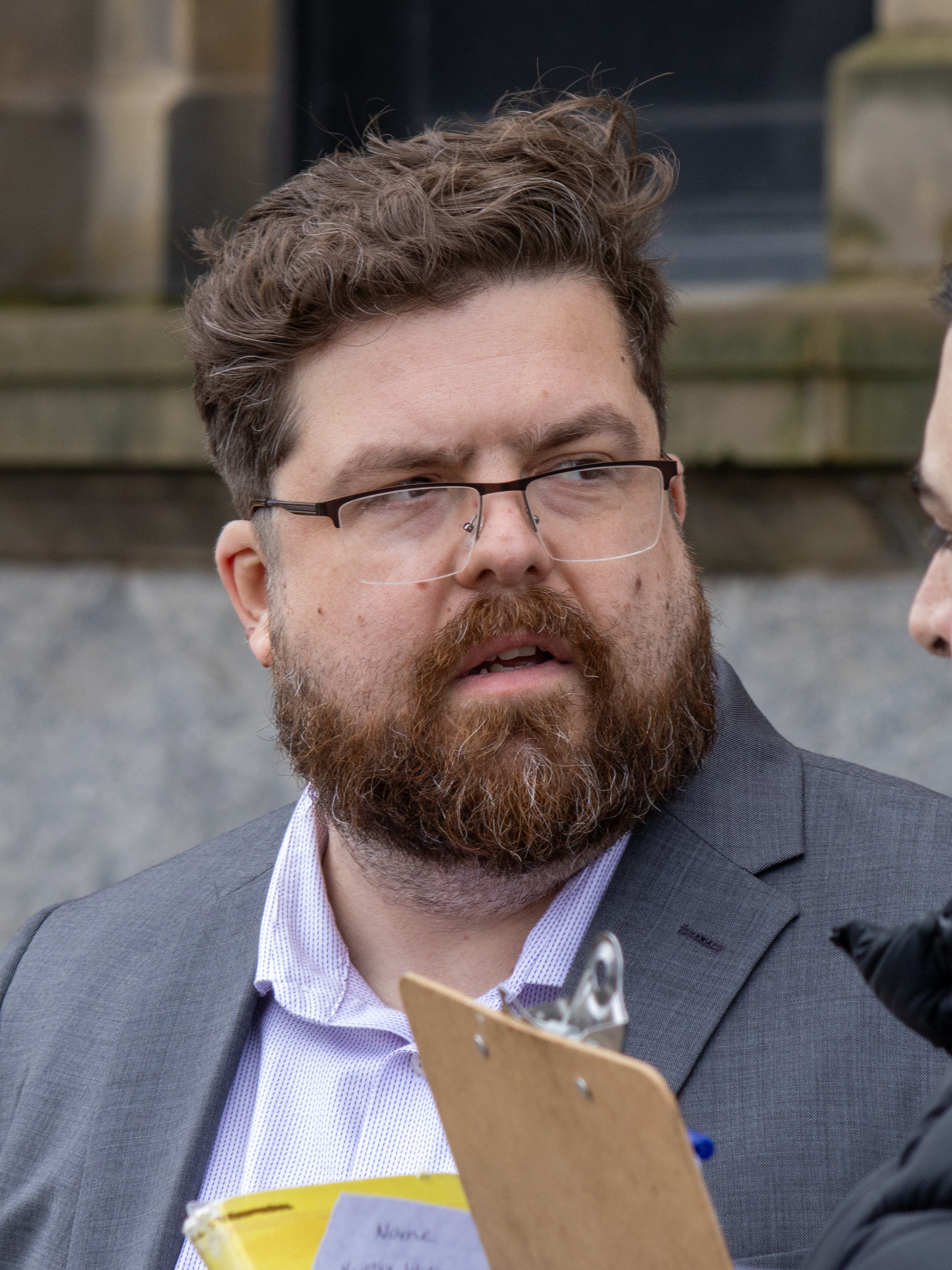
- White in 2026

Leader of the New Brunswick New Democratic Party
- Incumbent
- Assumed office August 11, 2023
- Preceded by: Himself (interim)

Interim
- In office June 28, 2022 – August 11, 2023
- Preceded by: Mackenzie Thomason
- Succeeded by: Himself

Personal details
- Born: November 4, 1984 (age 41)
- Party: New Brunswick New Democratic Party; New Democratic Party

Alex White (born November 4, 1984) is a Canadian politician and leader of the New Brunswick New Democratic Party. He was appointed as leader on August 11, 2023. White ran unsuccessfully in Quispamsis in the 2024 New Brunswick general election. Prior to his appointment, he spent around a year serving as the interim leader.

== Election results ==
2024 New Brunswick general election: Quispamsis
Party	Candidate	Votes	%	±%
Liberal	Aaron Kennedy	3,860	46.47	+32.0
Progressive Conservative	Blaine Higgs	3,667	44.14	-23.0
Green	Andrew Conradi	378	4.55	-2.1
New Democratic	Alex White	360	4.33	-1.9
Independent	David Raymond Amos	42	0.51	–
Total valid votes		8,307	99.72	
Total rejected ballots		23	0.28	
Turnout		8,330	72.24	
Eligible voters		11,220		
Liberal gain from Progressive Conservative		Swing		+27.5
Source: Elections New Brunswick

New Brunswick provincial by-election, April 24, 2023: Bathurst East-Nepisiguit-Saint-Isidore Resignation of Denis Landry to run for mayor of Hautes-Terres
Party	Candidate	Votes	%	±%
Liberal	Susan Holt	2,343	58.85	-4.91
Green	Serge Brideau	1,411	35.44	+23.22
New Democratic	Alex White	227	5.70	
Total valid votes		3,981	99.30	
Total rejected ballots		28	0.70	+0.29
Turnout		4,009	37.59	-23.01
Eligible voters		10,666		
Liberal hold		Swing		-14.06
Source: Elections New Brunswick

2020 New Brunswick general election: Hampton
Party	Candidate	Votes	%	±%
Progressive Conservative	Gary Crossman	4,351	60.52	+11.35
Liberal	Carley Parish	1,084	15.08	-4.23
Green	John Sabine	816	11.35	+1.48
People's Alliance	Sharon Bradley-Munn	687	9.56	-6.99
New Democratic	Alex White	251	3.49	-1.61
Total valid votes		7,189		
Total rejected ballots		21	0.29	+0.05
Turnout		7,210	60.86	-2.80
Eligible voters		11,846		
Progressive Conservative hold		Swing		+7.79
Source: Elections New Brunswick

2018 New Brunswick general election: Saint John East
Party	Candidate	Votes	%	±%
Progressive Conservative	Glen Savoie	3,017	45.62	+1.31
Liberal	Clare Manzer	1,775	26.84	-1.00
People's Alliance	Matthew Thompson	1,047	15.83	+15.07
New Democratic	Alex White	402	6.08	-15.80
Green	Lynaya Astephen	373	5.64	+0.42
Total valid votes		6,614	99.80	
Total rejected ballots		13	0.20	
Turnout		6,627	58.36	
Eligible voters		11,355		
Source: Elections New Brunswick
