= Hubert Seamans =

Canadian politician

Hubert James Seamans

MLA for Riverview
- In office 1985–1991
- Preceded by: Brenda Robertson
- Succeeded by: Gordon Willden

Personal details
- Born: June 30, 1951 (age 74) Saint George, New Brunswick
- Party: Liberal
- Occupation: businessman, banker

Hubert James Seamans (born June 30, 1951), is a businessman and former political figure in New Brunswick, Canada. He represented Riverview in the Legislative Assembly of New Brunswick from 1985 to 1991 as a Liberal member.

He was born in Saint George, New Brunswick, the son of Whitman Hubert Seamans and Jean Nells MacDonald. He was educated at Mount Allison University, the Royal Roads Military College and the University of New Brunswick. In 1973, Seamans married Elizabeth Ann McLaughlin. Seamans served on the town council for Riverview. He was first elected to the provincial assembly in a 1985 by-election held after Brenda Robertson was named to the Canadian Senate. He was Minister of Municipal Affairs from 1989 to 1991.

He owns Seahold Investments Inc. of Moncton, New Brunswick which provides bridge financing to people awaiting insurance claim settlements due to motor vehicle accidents. He worked in personal and corporate lending with a major Canadian chartered bank. He was a partner in a building supply business for twenty three years. He was the President of a private venture capital group in New Brunswick.

New Brunswick provincial government of Frank McKenna
Cabinet post (1)
Predecessor	Office	Successor
Vaughn Blaney	Minister of Municipal Affairs; 1989–1991	Marcelle Mersereau
