= Gordon Willden =

Canadian politician (1929–2019)

Member of the New Brunswick Legislative Assembly for Riverview
- In office September 23, 1991 – September 11, 1995
- Preceded by: Hubert Seamans
- Succeeded by: Al Kavanaugh

Personal details
- Born: November 18, 1929 Hollywood, California, U.S.
- Died: September 9, 2019 (aged 89) Moncton, New Brunswick, Canada
- Party: Confederation of Regions

Gordon B. Willden (November 18, 1929 – September 9, 2019) was a Canadian politician from the province of New Brunswick. He was elected to the Legislative Assembly of New Brunswick in 1991 and defeated for re-election when he switched seats in 1995.

He represented the electoral district of Riverview as part member of the New Brunswick Confederation of Regions Party.
