= Fundy-River Valley (electoral district) =

Defunct provincial electoral district in New Brunswick, Canada

New Brunswick electoral district
- Coordinates: 45.502°N 66.129°W

Defunct provincial electoral district
- Legislature: Legislative Assembly of New Brunswick
- District created: 1994
- District abolished: 2013
- First contested: 1995
- Last contested: 2010

Fundy-River Valley was a provincial electoral district for the Legislative Assembly of New Brunswick, Canada. It was established in the 1994 redistribution as Grand Bay-Westfield and, though its boundaries were not changed much in 2006, it was decided to change its name to Fundy-River Valley to better reflect that it includes much more than the town of Grand Bay-Westfield but the Maces Bay area on the Fundy Shore as well as the river valley up to Evandale and Welsford.

== Members of the Legislative Assembly ==
Assembly	Years	Member	Party
Grand Bay-Westfield; Riding created from Kings Centre, Queens South and Saint John West
53rd	1995–1999	Milt Sherwood	Progressive Conservative
54th	1999–2003	Milt Sherwood	Progressive Conservative
55th	2003–2006	Milt Sherwood	Progressive Conservative
Fundy-River Valley
56th	2006–2010	Jack Keir	Liberal
57th	2010–2014	Jim Parrott	Progressive Conservative
Riding dissolved into Kings Centre, Charlotte-The Isles and Saint John Lancaster

== Election results ==
=== Fundy-River Valley ===
2010 New Brunswick general election
Party	Candidate	Votes	%	±%
Progressive Conservative	Jim Parrott	3,629	57.52	+14.70
Liberal	Jack Keir	1,815	28.77	-17.33
New Democratic	David Sullivan	427	6.77	+2.07
Green	Stephanie Coburn	221	3.50	–
People's Alliance	Ed Hoyt	217	3.44	–
Total valid votes		6,309	100.0	
Total rejected ballots		35	0.55	
Turnout		6,344	68.38	
Eligible voters		9,277		
Progressive Conservative gain from Liberal		Swing		+16.02
Source: Elections New Brunswick

2006 New Brunswick general election
Party	Candidate	Votes	%	±%
Liberal	Jack Keir	2,793	46.10	+7.35
Progressive Conservative	Borden DeLong	2,594	42.82	-0.17
Independent	Colby Fraser	386	6.37	+2.69
New Democratic	Percy Ward	285	4.70	-6.12
Total valid votes		6,058	100.0	
Liberal gain from Progressive Conservative		Swing		+3.76

=== Grand Bay-Westfield ===
2003 New Brunswick general election
Party	Candidate	Votes	%	±%
Progressive Conservative	Milt Sherwood	2,209	42.99	-19.12
Liberal	Kevin Quinn	1,991	38.75	+13.65
New Democratic	Percy Ward	556	10.82	+2.24
Grey	Ben Perry	193	3.76	–
Independent	Colby Fraser	189	3.68	–
Total valid votes		5,138	100.0	
Progressive Conservative hold		Swing		-16.38
Independent candidate Colby Fraser lost 0.52 percentage points from his performance in 1999 as a Confederation of Regions candidate.

1999 New Brunswick general election
Party	Candidate	Votes	%	±%
Progressive Conservative	Milt Sherwood	3,546	62.11	+22.67
Liberal	Grace Losier	1,433	25.10	-1.67
New Democratic	Percy Ward	490	8.58	-16.30
Confederation of Regions	Colby Fraser	240	4.20	-4.71
Total valid votes		5,709	100.0	
Progressive Conservative hold		Swing		+12.17

1995 New Brunswick general election
Party	Candidate	Votes	%	±%
Progressive Conservative	Milt Sherwood	2,332	39.44	
Liberal	Edward Kelly	1,583	26.77	
New Democratic	Julie Dingwell	1,471	24.88	
Confederation of Regions	Colby Fraser	527	8.91	
Total valid votes		5,913	100.0	
Progressive Conservative notional gain		Swing		

== See also ==
- List of New Brunswick provincial electoral districts
- Canadian provincial electoral districts
