= Pat Crossman =

Canadian politician

Member of the New Brunswick Legislative Assembly for Riverview
- In office June 7, 1999 – December 20, 2002
- Preceded by: Al Kavanaugh
- Succeeded by: Bruce Fitch

Personal details
- Born: 1940
- Died: December 20, 2002 (aged 61–62)
- Party: Progressive Conservative Party

Patricia Crossman (1940 – December 20, 2002) was a political figure in New Brunswick, Canada. She represented Riverview in the Legislative Assembly of New Brunswick from 1999 to 2002 as a Progressive Conservative member.

She was born in Moncton, New Brunswick and educated at Acadia University. She was a school board trustee and was president of the New Brunswick School Trustees Association from 1987 to 1990 and of the Canadian School Boards Association from 1994 to 1997. Crossman died in office at the age of 62.

Crossman's maternal grandfather, Oscar E. Morehouse, also served in the New Brunswick legislature as a Conservative member for York County from 1911 to 1917.
