= Margaret-Ann Blaney =

Canadian journalist and politician

Member of the New Brunswick Legislative Assembly for Rothesay Saint John-Kings (1999-2006)
- In office June 7, 1999 – May 16, 2012
- Preceded by: Laureen Jarrett
- Succeeded by: Ted Flemming

New Brunswick Transportation Minister
- In office 1999–2001
- Preceded by: Sheldon Lee
- Succeeded by: Percy Mockler

New Brunswick Public Safety Minister
- In office 2001–2003
- Preceded by: Milt Sherwood
- Succeeded by: Wayne Steeves

New Brunswick Training and Employment Development Minister
- In office 2003–2006
- Preceded by: Norm McFarlane
- Succeeded by: Jody Carr

New Brunswick Environment Minister
- In office 2010 – May 16, 2012
- Preceded by: Rick Miles
- Succeeded by: Craig Leonard

New Brunswick Minister responsible for the Status of Women
- In office 1999–2006
- Preceded by: Marcelle Mersereau
- Succeeded by: Joan MacAlpine-Stiles

New Brunswick Minister responsible for the Status of Women
- In office 2010 – May 16, 2012
- Preceded by: Mary Schryer

New Brunswick Minister responsible for Communications New Brunswick
- In office 2010 – May 16, 2012
- Preceded by: Victor Boudreau

Personal details
- Born: Margaret-Ann O'Rourke Corner Brook, Newfoundland, Canada
- Party: Progressive Conservative
- Occupation: Journalist, Politician

Margaret-Ann Blaney (née O'Rourke; born 1961 in Corner Brook, Newfoundland) is a Canadian journalist and politician. She was a member of the Legislative Assembly of New Brunswick from 1999 until May 2012, representing Rothesay (formerly Saint John-Kings) as member of the Progressive Conservative Party.

== Early life ==
An honours graduate with a Bachelor's degree from Memorial University of Newfoundland in St. John's, Newfoundland, Blaney worked as a reporter for both television and radio from 1982 to 1993, when she was encouraged by John Crosbie to become a candidate against Brian Tobin in the 1993 Canadian federal election, finishing a distant second. Shortly thereafter she married and moved to Rothesay, New Brunswick where she managed her husband's veterinary practice. In 1994, Ms. Blaney and her husband started their own small business, the Atlantic Veterinary Hospital in Rothesay, N.B. She was active in the business as co-owner / general manager until June 1999. In 1997, she was a candidate for leader of the Progressive Conservative Party of New Brunswick, losing to Bernard Lord.

== Political career ==
She was elected to the New Brunswick legislature in the 1999 election and was named to cabinet as Minister of Transportation. While minister, her riding executive solicited donations from highway contractors, implying that Blaney would favour those who donated. There was briefly a large amount of controversy surrounding this, however; the Moncton Times & Transcript newspaper ran an editorial cartoon with one contractor asking another, while referring to a bulge in his pocket, "Is that Margaret-Ann Blaney in your pocket or are you just happy to see me?" This cartoon was derided as sexist and both Blaney and Bernard Lord cried in the legislature when commenting on it. The legislature unanimously passed a motion condemning the cartoon and the controversy soon shifted from Blaney to the paper.

In 2001, Blaney was shuffled to the Department of Public Safety. She was re-elected in 2003 and became Minister of Training & Employment Development. On February 14, 2006, she was shuffled out of cabinet; she said this was by choice as she wanted to focus more closely on riding issues. She was re-elected in 2006 and sat in opposition to the new Liberal government.

On October 12, 2010 Blaney became a member of the Executive Council and Environment Minister, Minister Responsible for the Advisory Council on the Status of Women and Minister Responsible for Communications New Brunswick. On March 15, 2012 Blaney became Energy Minister and Minister Responsible for the Status of Women.

=== Resignation and appointment to chief executive officer of Efficiency New Brunswick ===
On May 16, 2012 Blaney announced that she was resigning as a minister and MLA, and had accepted appointment as chief executive officer of Efficiency New Brunswick.

In 2014 the Liberal government of Brian Gallant dissolved Efficiency New Brunswick and terminated Blaney's position with no severance pay, and she filed a human rights complaint. In July 2025 the New Brunswick Labour and Employment Board ruled that this was discrimination because of her previous political activity, and awarded her over $700 000 in compensation.

== Electoral history ==
2010 New Brunswick election: Rothesay
Party	Candidate	Votes	%	±%
Progressive Conservative	Margaret-Ann Blaney	3374	56.57	+7.94
Liberal	Victoria Clarke	1694	28.40	-18.73
NDP	Pamela Scichilone	535	8.37	+4.13
Green	Sharon Murphy-Flatt	361	6.05	-

2006 New Brunswick general election: Rothesay
Party	Candidate	Votes	%	±%
Progressive Conservative	Margaret-Ann Blaney	2853	48.6	+0.6
Liberal	Paul Barry	2765	47.1	+10.5
NDP	Troy Polchies	249	4.2	-7.9

2003 New Brunswick general election: Saint John-Kings
Party	Candidate	Votes	%	±%
Progressive Conservative	Margaret-Ann Blaney	3,135	48.0	-17.6
Liberal	Tom Young	2,456	37.6	+12.6
NDP	Jeff Joseph Thibodeau	791	12.1	+2.6
Grey	Mark LeBlanc	145	2.2	–

1999 New Brunswick general election: Saint John-Kings
Party	Candidate	Votes	%	±%
Progressive Conservative	Margaret-Ann Blaney	4,605	65.6	+29.6
Liberal	Zita Longobardi	1,752	25.0	-19.6
NDP	Ken Wilcox	664	9.5	-2.1

1997 PCNB leadership first ballot
Candidate	Votes	%
Bernard Lord	1,390	36.6
Norm Betts	1,223	32.2
Cleveland Allaby	663	17.4
Margaret-Ann Blaney	527	13.9
Blaney eliminated, Allaby withdrew

1993 Canadian federal election
Party	Candidate	Votes	%	±%
Liberal	Brian Tobin	25,920	82.18	+15.15
Progressive Conservative	Margaret Ann O'Rourke	4,852	15.38	-13.91
New Democratic	Linda Soper	770	2.44	-1.24
Total votes		31,542	100.00	
