= Brenda Robertson =

Canadian politician (1929–2020)

The Honourable Brenda Mary Robertson CM ONB

Senator for Riverview, New Brunswick
- In office December 21, 1984 – May 23, 2004
- Appointed by: Brian Mulroney

MLA for Albert
- In office 1967–1971 Serving with Claude D. Taylor
- Preceded by: Claude D. Taylor / Everett E. Newcombe
- In office 1971–1974 Serving with Malcolm MacLeod
- Succeeded by: Malcolm MacLeod

MLA for Riverview
- In office 1974–1984
- Preceded by: Riding created in 1974.
- Succeeded by: Hubert Seamans

Personal details
- Born: May 23, 1929 Sussex, New Brunswick
- Died: September 23, 2020 (aged 91) Riverview, New Brunswick
- Party: Conservative; Progressive Conservative (1984–2004)
- Other political affiliations: Progressive Conservative Party of New Brunswick
- Spouse: Wilmont "Willie" Robertson
- Children: 3
- Profession: Politician
- Cabinet: Minister of Social Program Reform (1982–1984); Minister of Health (1976 & 1978–1982); Minister of Social Services (1972–1974); Minister of Welfare (1971–1972); Minister of Youth (1970–1974)
- Committees: Chairman, Standing Committee on Privileges, Standing Rules and Orders (1991–1996)

Brenda Mary Robertson CM ONB (née Tubb, May 23, 1929 – September 23, 2020) was a Canadian politician who served as Senator. She was the first woman elected to the Legislative Assembly of New Brunswick and the first woman to become a cabinet minister in the province.

== Life ==
Born in Sussex, New Brunswick, she was elected to the Legislative Assembly of New Brunswick representing the district of Albert in 1967 and was re-elected four times (1970, 1974, 1978, and 1982) representing the district of Riverview. In 1970, she was appointed Youth Minister. She was also Minister of Social Welfare, Minister of Social Services, Minister of Health, and Minister for Social Program Reform. She remained a Member until her appointment to the Senate on December 21, 1984, representing the senatorial division of Riverview, New Brunswick. She sat as a Progressive Conservative and a Conservative until her retirement on her 75th birthday in 2004. She died on September 23, 2020, at the age of 91.

== Honours ==
In 2004, she was made a Member of the Order of New Brunswick in honour of "her tremendous work ethic and commitment to serve New Brunswickers and her country." In 2008, she was made a Member of the Order of Canada in recognition of being a "trailblazer and role model for women in politics".

She received an honorary degree of Doctor of Humane Letters from Mount St. Vincent University in 1973 and an honorary degree of Doctor of Social Science from University of Moncton in 1983.

In 2023 the new bridge over the Petitcodiac River connecting Moncton and Riverview was named The Honourable Brenda Robertson Bridge.
