= Al Kavanaugh =

Canadian politician

Member of the New Brunswick Legislative Assembly for Riverview
- In office September 11, 1995 – June 7, 1999
- Preceded by: Gordon Willden
- Succeeded by: Pat Crossman

Personal details
- Party: Liberal
- Occupation: Educator

Al Kavanaugh is a former politician in the province of New Brunswick, Canada. He was elected to the Legislative Assembly of New Brunswick in 1995 and defeated for re-election by Pat Crossman in 1999.

He represented the electoral district of Riverview.
