= 1997 Progressive Conservative Party of New Brunswick leadership election =

- Date: October 18, 1997
- Convention: Fredericton, New Brunswick (with 4 other satellite voting locations)
- Resigning leader: Bernard Valcourt
- Won by: Bernard Lord
- Ballots: 2
- Candidates: 4

The Progressive Conservative Party of New Brunswick held a leadership election in 1997 to replace its outgoing leader Bernard Valcourt. The winner was Bernard Lord who would go on to win the riding of Moncton East in a by-election and lead the party to victory in the 1999 and 2003 elections.

== Results ==
1997 PCNB leadership first ballot
Candidate	Votes	%
Bernard Lord	1,390	36.6
Norm Betts	1,223	32.2
Cleveland Allaby	663	17.4
Margaret-Ann Blaney	527	13.9
Blaney eliminated, Allaby withdrew

1997 PCNB leadership second ballot
Candidate	Votes	%
Bernard Lord	1,830	56.4
Norm Betts	1,413	45.6
Lord wins
