= Kings Centre =

Provincial electoral district in New Brunswick, Canada

New Brunswick electoral district
- The riding of Kings Centre (as it exists from 2023) in relation to other New Brunswick electoral districts
- Coordinates: 45.507°N 66.049°W

Provincial electoral district
- Legislature: Legislative Assembly of New Brunswick
MLA
Bill Oliver
Progressive Conservative
- District created: 2013
- First contested: 2014
- Last contested: 2024

Demographics
- Population (2011): 14,727
- Electors (2013): 10,952
- Census division(s): Kings, Queens, Charlotte

Kings Centre is a provincial electoral district for the Legislative Assembly of New Brunswick, Canada. It was first contested in the 2014 general election, having been created in the 2013 redistribution of electoral boundaries. It drew most of its population from the former districts of Fundy-River Valley and Hampton-Kings, as well as from a small part of Kings East.

The district includes the western and north-central parts of Kings County, including the Kingston Peninsula and the village of Valley Waters, as well as the town of Grand Bay-Westfield and small parts of Queens and Charlotte Counties to its north and west.

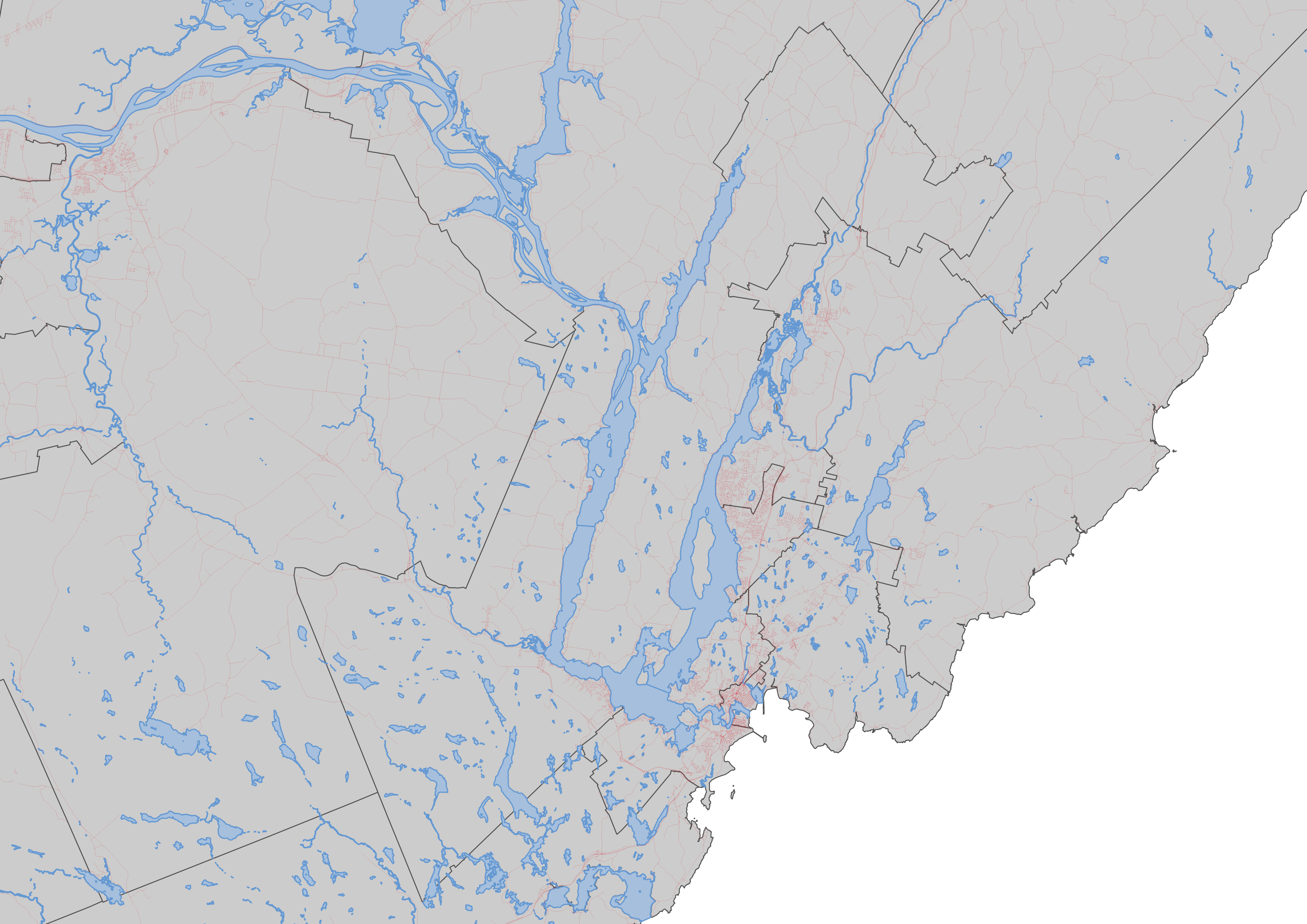
Kings Centre (as it exists from 2023) and the roads in the riding

== Members of the Legislative Assembly ==
Assembly	Years	Member	Party
Riding created from Fundy-River Valley, Hampton-Kings and Kings East
58th	2014–2018	Bill Oliver	Progressive Conservative
59th	2018–2020	Bill Oliver	Progressive Conservative
60th	2020–2024	Bill Oliver	Progressive Conservative
61st	2024–Present	Bill Oliver	Progressive Conservative

== Election results ==
2024 New Brunswick general election
Party	Candidate	Votes	%	±%
Progressive Conservative	Bill Oliver	3,821	49.9%	-11.64
Liberal	Brian Stephenson	2,557	33.4%	+21.17
Green	Bruce Dryer	1,136	14.8%	+1.29
Libertarian	Crystal Tays	139	1.8%	
Total valid votes		7,653		
Total rejected ballots				
Turnout				
Eligible voters				
Progressive Conservative hold		Swing		
Source: Elections New Brunswick

2020 New Brunswick general election
Party	Candidate	Votes	%	±%
Progressive Conservative	Bill Oliver	4,583	61.54	+18.43
Green	Bruce Dryer	1,006	13.51	+3.86
Liberal	Paul Adams	911	12.23	-11.32
People's Alliance	William Edgett	693	9.31	-9.87
New Democratic	Margaret Anderson Kilfoil	254	3.41	-1.10
Total valid votes		7,447	99.89	
Total rejected ballots		8	0.11	
Turnout		7,455	65.96	
Eligible voters		11,302		
Progressive Conservative hold		Swing		+7.29
Source: Elections New Brunswick

2018 New Brunswick general election
Party	Candidate	Votes	%	±%
Progressive Conservative	Bill Oliver	3,267	43.11	+7.45
Liberal	Bill Merrifield	1,785	23.55	-7.40
People's Alliance	Dave Peters	1,454	19.18	--
Green	Bruce Dryer	731	9.65	+5.09
New Democratic	Susan Jane Shedd	342	4.51	-19.58
Total valid votes		7,579	100.0	
Total rejected ballots		10		
Turnout		7,589	66.70	
Eligible voters		11,378		
Source: Elections New Brunswick

2014 New Brunswick general election
Party	Candidate	Votes	%
Progressive Conservative	Bill Oliver	2,431	35.66
Liberal	Shannon Merrifield	2,110	30.95
New Democratic	Daniel Anderson	1,642	24.09
Independent	Colby Fraser	323	4.74
Green	Mark Connell	311	4.56
Total valid votes		6,817	100.0
Total rejected ballots		18	0.26
Turnout		6,835	60.18
Eligible voters		11,357	
This riding was created from parts of Fundy-River Valley, Hampton-Kings and Sussex-Fundy-St. Martins, all of which elected a Progressive Conservative in the previous election. Neither of the three incumbents ran in this election.
Source: Elections New Brunswick

== See also ==
- List of New Brunswick provincial electoral districts
- Canadian provincial electoral districts
