= Ted Flemming (politician) =

New Brunswick Canada politician (born 1954)

Ted Flemming KC
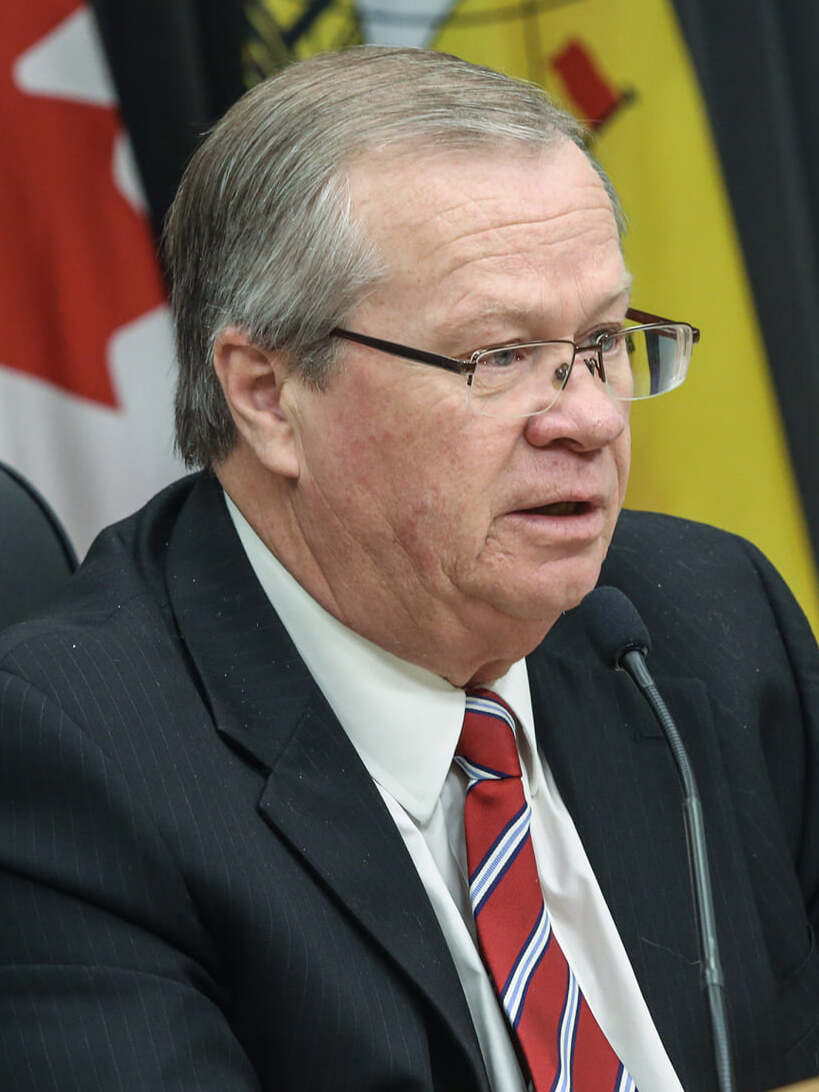
- Flemming in 2022

Attorney General of New Brunswick
- In office September 29, 2020 – November 2, 2024
- Premier: Blaine Higgs
- Preceded by: Andrea Anderson-Mason
- Succeeded by: Rob McKee
- In office September 23, 2013 – October 7, 2014
- Premier: David Alward
- Preceded by: Marie-Claude Blais
- Succeeded by: Serge Rousselle

Minister of Justice
- In office September 29, 2020 – November 2, 2024
- Premier: Blaine Higgs
- Preceded by: Andrea Anderson-Mason
- Succeeded by: Rob McKee

Minister of Health of New Brunswick
- In office November 9, 2018 – September 29, 2020
- Premier: Blaine Higgs
- Preceded by: Benoît Bourque
- Succeeded by: Dorothy Shephard
- In office September 6, 2012 – October 7, 2014
- Premier: David Alward
- Preceded by: Madeleine Dubé
- Succeeded by: Victor Boudreau

Member of the New Brunswick Legislative Assembly for Rothesay
- In office June 25, 2012 – September 19, 2024
- Preceded by: Margaret-Ann Blaney
- Succeeded by: Alyson Townsend

Personal details
- Born: Hugh John Alexander Flemming III; June 13, 1954 (age 71) Sussex, New Brunswick, Canada
- Party: Progressive Conservative
- Relatives: Hugh John Flemming (grandfather); Aida McAnn Flemming (grandmother)

Hugh John Alexander "Ted" Flemming KC (born June 13, 1954) is a retired Canadian politician who served as a member of the MLA for the electoral district of Rothesay in New Brunswick and in the cabinets of David Alward and Blaine Higgs. Flemming was first elected to the legislature in a by-election on June 25, 2012, but lost his seat in the 2024 New Brunswick general election.

Flemming graduated from the University of New Brunswick law school in 1978 and was appointed Queen's Counsel in 1992. He has served on the board of directors of the New Brunswick Financial Consumer Services Commission, the Saint John Port Authority and the Business Development Bank of Canada. The Law Society of New Brunswick currently lists him as a retired member.

== Before politics ==
Flemming was born on June 13, 1954, in Sussex, New Brunswick. He is the son of Hugh John Flemming Jr., a university professor.

Flemming completed his high school education at Millidgeville North High School in Saint John, NB and is a graduate of the University of New Brunswick, Saint John campus, and the Faculty of Law at UNB Fredericton as a Beaverbrook Law Scholar.

On June 25, 1977, he married Nancy Doucet from Petit-Rocher, New Brunswick. The Flemmings have three children: Jonathan, Sarah and Heather and three grandchildren Hugh, Adam and Nathan.

Flemming is from the fourth generation of the Flemming family to seek office under the Progressive Conservative Party of New Brunswick. His father, Hugh John Flemming Jr., was an unsuccessful candidate for the legislature in the riding of Saint John North in the 1974 provincial election.

His grandfather, Hugh John Flemming was Premier of New Brunswick and a member of John Diefenbaker's federal cabinet. His great-grandfather James Kidd Flemming was also Premier and a member of the House of Commons of Canada.

== Early career ==
Flemming was the President of the Saint John East Progressive Conservative electoral district and nominated Gerald Merrithew, who went on to win the Saint John riding in the 1984 Canadian federal election. Elected to the House of Commons of Canada in Ottawa, and with his party winning the election, Merrithew was a key cabinet minister delivering the $6.2 billion contract to construct a dozen patrol frigates for the Canadian navy employing over 4,000 workers in the late 1980s in Saint John. Flemming was a close political confidant of Merrithew on both provincial and federal political issues.

A resident of Rothesay for over three decades, Flemming practiced law for more than 20 years, specializing in corporate, commercial, securities transportation and construction law, and was appointed Queen's Counsel in 1992 at 38 years of age. He was Counsel to Gilbert, McGloan, Gillis Barristers & Solicitors from 1992 to 2010 and a partner with Clark, Drummie Barristers & Solicitors from 1978 to 1991.

=== Businessman ===
Flemming owned several successful businesses including Caldwell Transport Limited, Can-Am Charter Service, Maritime Truck and Trailer Inc., Provincial Lumber Limited and Brunswick Timber Exports Inc.

Caldwell Transport was a general common carrier operating 70 trucks from its Rothesay, NB office and provided full truck load service to a variety of customers primarily in the forest products, peat moss, dry bulk, construction materials and food service sectors.

Can-Am Charter Services was a charter bus service operating 17 luxury motor coaches throughout eastern Canada and the United States. Maritime Truck and Trailer was a full service truck and trailer maintenance centre with five bays, five mechanics and service representatives.

Provincial Lumber was the province's largest importer and exporter of forest products consisting of many former Flemming and Gibson executives.

At its peak, Flemming was the president of a group of companies with combined sales of $35 million and more than 125 employees. Flemming retired from his business career December 31, 2011.

=== Board member ===
Flemming served as a director of Market Square Corporation, the New Brunswick Securities Commission, the Saint John Port Authority.

Flemming, who was general counsel for all legal matters for the Saint John Port Corporation from 1986 to 1995, was a member of the board of directors for the Port of Saint John beginning in 2008 and vice-chairman in 2010 serving on the Executive and Audit Committees.

Flemming was a member of the New Brunswick Securities Commission including chairman of the Audit Committee from 2004 to 2008.

A director on the BDC board for ten years from 1986 to 1996, Flemming served as a member of the executive committee and chairman of the Audit and Pension Committees.

Flemming was a member of the board of directors for Market Square Corporation including chairman of the Audit Committee from 1980 to 1989.

Flemming also served on the Town of Rothesay Planning Advisory Committee and as Atlantic Canada representative on the Rhodes Scholarship Selection Committee.

== Political career ==
Flemming entered politics in the spring of 2012 becoming a candidate in a by-election in the provincial riding of Rothesay. Flemming won the campaign and within just a few months was named to the cabinet position of minister of health under Premier David Alward. He later became Attorney General of New Brunswick in addition to his responsibilities at health in 2013. He also served as Attorney-General and Justice minister in the government of Blaine Higgs from 2020 until 2024.

Flemming was re-elected in the 2014, 2018, and 2020 provincial elections however lost his seat in the 2024 election.

== Electoral record ==
=== Rothesay ===
2024 New Brunswick general election: Rothesay
Party	Candidate	Votes	%	±%
Liberal	Alyson Townsend	4,085	50.48	+30.7
Progressive Conservative	Ted Flemming	3,373	41.68	-22.5
Green	Zara MacKay-Boyce	549	6.78	-2.3
Libertarian	Austin Venedam	85	1.05	
Total valid votes		8,092	99.90	
Total rejected ballots		8	0.10	
Turnout		8,100	70.79	
Eligible voters		11,442		
Liberal gain from Progressive Conservative		Swing		+26.6
Source: Elections New Brunswick

2024 New Brunswick general election
Party	Candidate	Votes	%	±%
Liberal	Alyson Townsend	4,085	50.5	
Progressive Conservative	Ted Flemming	3,373	41.7	
Green	Zara MacKay-Boyce	549	6.8	
Libertarian	Austin Venedam	85	1.1	
Total valid votes		8,092		
Liberal gain		Swing		PC
Source: Canadian Broadcasting Corporation

2020 New Brunswick general election
Party	Candidate	Votes	%	±%
Progressive Conservative	Ted Flemming	4,265	61.28	+11.30
Liberal	Jason Hickey	1,463	21.02	-7.21
Green	Ann McAllister	719	10.33	+2.27
People's Alliance	Michael Griffin	413	5.93	-4.25
Independent	Liz Kramer	56	0.80	
Independent	N. B. Barnett	44	0.63	
Total valid votes		6,960		
Total rejected ballots		14	0.20	-0.11
Turnout		6,974	63.22	-0.31
Eligible voters		11,031		
Progressive Conservative hold		Swing		+9.26
Source: Elections New Brunswick

2018 New Brunswick general election
Party	Candidate	Votes	%	±%
Progressive Conservative	Ted Flemming	3,542	49.98	+4.78
Liberal	Stephanie Tomilson	2,001	28.23	+0.85
People's Alliance	Michael Griffin	722	10.19	+10.19
Green	Ann McAllister	571	8.06	+3.86
New Democratic	Josh Floyd	251	3.54	-19.68
Total valid votes		7,087	100.0	
Total rejected ballots		22	0.31	
Turnout		7,109	63.53	
Eligible voters		11,190		
Progressive Conservative hold		Swing		+1.97
Source: Elections New Brunswick

2014 New Brunswick general election
Party	Candidate	Votes	%	±%
Progressive Conservative	Hugh J. "Ted" Flemming	3,034	45.20	+6.94
Liberal	Stephanie Tomilson	1,838	27.38	-3.89
New Democratic	John Wilcox	1,559	23.22	-4.05
Green	Ann McAllister	282	4.20	+2.58
Total valid votes		6,713	100.0	
Total rejected ballots		14	0.21	
Turnout		6,727	61.40	+16.29
Eligible voters		10,956		
Progressive Conservative notional hold		Swing		+5.42
Source: Elections New Brunswick

New Brunswick provincial by-election, June 25, 2012 On the resignation of Margaret-Ann Blaney, May 16, 2012
Party	Candidate	Votes	%	±%
Progressive Conservative	Hugh John "Ted" Flemming III	1,625	38.26	-18.31
Liberal	John Wilcox	1,328	31.27	+2.87
New Democratic	Dominic Cardy	1,158	27.27	+18.30
Green	Sharon Murphy	69	1.62	-4.43
Independent	Marjorie MacMurray	62	1.46	–
Total valid votes		4,242	100.0	
Total rejected ballots		11	0.26	
Turnout		4,253	45.11	-22.10
Eligible voters		9,428		
Progressive Conservative hold		Swing		-10.63
Source: Elections New Brunswick
