= Peter LeBlanc (politician) =

Canadian politician and accountant

Peter David LeBlanc
- Born: December 24, 1938 (age 87); Montreal, Quebec
- Occupations: accountant, politician
- Known for: member of Legislative Assembly of New Brunswick (1995–1999)

Peter David LeBlanc (born December 24, 1938) is a former chartered accountant and former political figure in New Brunswick, Canada. He represented Kennebecasis in the Legislative Assembly of New Brunswick from 1995 to 1999 as a Liberal member.

LeBlanc is now the owner and co-operator of a Christmas tree farm and apple orchard located in Quispamsis NB, Kennebecasis Apple Orchard.

He was born December 24, 1938, in Montreal, Quebec, the son of Paul LeBlanc and Beatrice Mary MacDonald. In 1973, he married Carolyn Crowther. LeBlanc served as Minister of Supply and Services from 1997 to 1998. He had been a member of the town council for Rothesay, New Brunswick. LeBlanc was defeated when he ran for reelection in 1999.
