= Blaine Higgs =

Premier of New Brunswick from 2018 to 2024

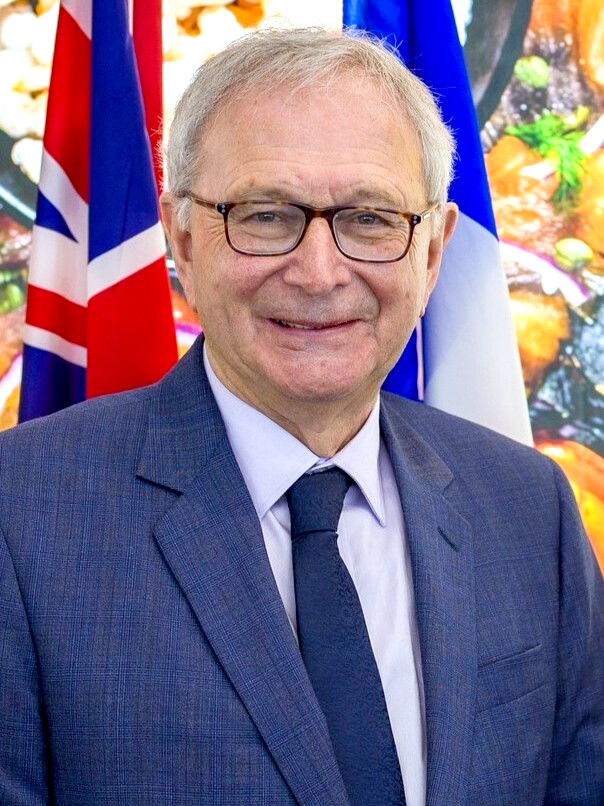
- Higgs in 2024

34th Premier of New Brunswick
- In office November 9, 2018 – November 2, 2024
- Monarchs: Elizabeth II; Charles III
- Lieutenant Governor: Jocelyne Roy-Vienneau; Brenda Murphy
- Deputy: Robert Gauvin (2018–20)
- Preceded by: Brian Gallant
- Succeeded by: Susan Holt

Leader of the Opposition
- In office October 22, 2016 – November 9, 2018
- Preceded by: Bruce Fitch
- Succeeded by: Brian Gallant

Leader of the Progressive Conservative Party of New Brunswick
- In office October 22, 2016 – October 28, 2024
- Preceded by: Bruce Fitch (interim)
- Succeeded by: Glen Savoie (interim)

Minister of Finance
- In office October 12, 2010 – October 7, 2014
- Premier: David Alward
- Preceded by: Greg Byrne
- Succeeded by: Roger Melanson

Member of the New Brunswick Legislative Assembly for Quispamsis
- In office September 27, 2010 – September 19, 2024
- Preceded by: Mary Schryer
- Succeeded by: Aaron Kennedy

Personal details
- Born: Blaine Myron Higgs; March 1, 1954 (age 72) Woodstock, New Brunswick, Canada
- Party: Progressive Conservative
- Other political affiliations: Confederation of Regions (1989–2002)
- Spouse: Marcia Higgs

Blaine Myron Higgs (born March 1, 1954) is a former Canadian politician who served as the 34th premier of New Brunswick from 2018 to 2024 and leader of the New Brunswick Progressive Conservative Party (PC Party) from 2016 to 2024.

Higgs graduated from the University of New Brunswick as an engineer, going on to spend 33 years working for Irving Oil. In his early political journey, he joined New Brunswick Confederation of Regions Party, of which he ran for leadership in 1989, and left the party in 2002. As a Progressive Conservative, Higgs was first elected to the legislature in the 2010 provincial election and served as the Minister of Finance from 2010 to 2014 under the leadership of David Alward. In the 2018 provincial election, Higgs narrowly carried the PCs to a minority government, despite losing the popular vote. Higgs and the PC's were re-elected in the 2020 provincial election, though this time with a majority government.

In the 2024 New Brunswick general election, Higgs and the Progressive Conservatives lost their bid for a third term to the Liberals of Susan Holt, which won a majority government. Higgs lost his seat in the riding of Quispamsis to Aaron Kennedy of the Liberal Party, the first time since 1987 that a sitting New Brunswick Premier lost in their own riding. Higgs resigned as leader of the Progressive Conservative party a week after the election.

== Early life and education ==
Blaine Myron Higgs was born on March 1, 1954, in Woodstock, New Brunswick. The son of Carl, a customs officer, and Bertha, who taught in Fosterville, Higgs grew up in Forest City, a rural community in York County which sits along the Canada–United States border. His family was politically Liberal. Higgs was educated at a small elementary school, being taught by his mother and his aunt, later attending Canterbury High School. After graduating from high school, Higgs pursued mechanical engineering at the University of New Brunswick (UNB) in Fredericton.

== Irving Oil career ==
Higgs graduated from UNB in 1977 with a Bachelor of Science in mechanical engineering; he started working for Irving Oil the following week, and spent the next 33 years working for the company and climbing the corporate ladder. He finished Queen's University's executive management training program in 1993, and further took Babson Executive Training and Education finance and leadership courses. Higgs retired from Irving Oil in 2010; by this time, he had been the director of logistics and distribution.

== Early political activities ==
Higgs initially supported the Liberal Association but later left for reasons he cited as the party having lacked "common-sense democracy". While still working for Irving Oil, Higgs, a unilingual, opposed the province's Official Languages Act, and proclaimed that an "inevitable association dedicated exclusively to the preservation of English Canadians" was needed. Upon its formation, Higgs became involved with New Brunswick's right-wing, anti-bilingual Confederation of Regions Party (CoR). In 1985, Higgs handwrote a brief and presented it to the Guérette-Smith Commission, starting it by praising the United States for being "united under one flag, one government, and one language," adding that "we will never achieve such a level of loyalty and unity when at the same time we embark on a process supporting two different cultures." In 1989, Higgs ran for the leadership of the CoR Party. In his bid for the COR leadership, Higgs "complained about francophones 'who can speak the common language, but refuse to'". He also supported an elected Senate, opposed the Meech Lake Accord, favoured fixed terms for government, and stated "We do not have an obligation to cater to those people who can speak the common language, English, and refuse to do so".

=== MLA for Quispamsis ===
On May 6, 2010, Higgs launched his campaign for his debut candidacy in the Legislative Assembly of New Brunswick during the 2010 provincial elections shortly after retiring from Irving Oil. Representing the Progressive Conservative Party in the provincial electoral district of Quispamsis, Higgs cited property taxes as being one of the Kennebecasis Valley's largest issues during the election. During his campaign, he addressed his previous affiliation with the CoR Party, stating that he was against "forced bilingualism ... as a legislated thing, quickly, overnight" at the time, adding that he had a change of views since then.

==== Finance minister ====
On October 12, 2010, Higgs was sworn-in as Minister of Finance, Minister responsible for the New Brunswick Liquor Corporation, Minister responsible for the New Brunswick Investment Management Corporation, Minister responsible for the New Brunswick Lotteries and Gaming Corporation, and Chair of the Board of Management. He also served as Minister of Human Resources until October 9, 2012. While Higgs was Minister of Finance, the decision was made to stop making regular payments to pension plans, later causing pension issues for Canadian Union of Public Employees (CUPE) members leading to the strike in 2021.

==== Progressive Conservative Party leadership ====
Higgs represented the electoral district of Quispamsis as a Member of the Legislative Assembly, and, since October 22, 2016, leader of the Progressive Conservative Party of New Brunswick. On that date the Progressive Conservative Party of New Brunswick leadership election was held and on the third ballot he defeated former Saint John Mayor Mel Norton, 1,563 to 1,169.

===== 2018 provincial election =====
In the 2018 provincial election, Higgs and his party won the largest share of seats in the legislature, 22, compared to 21 for the governing Liberal Party of New Brunswick. The Liberals opted to attempt to remain in power as a minority government by presenting a Throne Speech, in hopes of retaining the confidence of the Legislative Assembly of New Brunswick.

On November 2, 2018, the Progressive Conservatives and the People's Alliance voted to defeat Premier Brian Gallant's Liberal minority government via a non-confidence motion in the legislature. The non-confidence motion passed 25-23, with 22 Progressive Conservative MLAs and 3 People's Alliance members voting to defeat the government. 20 Liberal and 3 Green members voted against the motion. The Progressive Conservatives subsequently formed government, with the support of the People's Alliance.

== Premier of New Brunswick (2018–2024) ==
Higgs was appointed Premier on November 9, 2018. At 64 years of age at the time of swearing-in, Higgs is the oldest person to be sworn in as Premier in New Brunswick history, and in April 2019 became the oldest ever Premier in New Brunswick history, surpassing Leonard Percy de Wolfe Tilley in both records.

=== Economic policy ===
In 2019, Higgs began repealing several financial assistance programs for New Brunswick students attending post-secondary institutions. His party deemed programs such as the Timely Completion Benefit, established in May 2009, to be "very costly". The Progressive Conservative Party of New Brunswick believed redistributing the funds allocated to this program through a tuition tax credit was a "better" way to reach more students. This move, along with the removal of the Free Tuition Program, were highly criticized by students across the province, with some emphasizing that there is no longer any incentive to remain in New Brunswick to work or study.

In 2020, Higgs opted out of a federal program to fund public transit in New Brunswick, as he "misunderstood details" of the federal program designed to rescue municipal transit services. Higgs claimed multiple times that the funding was for capital projects, but according to a government backgrounder on the agreement, that specific program was meant to address the operating deficits and revenue shortfalls caused by the pandemic. Higgs also claimed that the program was only for larger provinces, stating, "that was a specific request for infrastructure funding for subways and for systems in Toronto and Montreal and BC — for the big cities." Documents later showed that Saskatchewan, Manitoba and Nova Scotia have received a combined $57.1 million from Ottawa's "Safe Restart" public transit aid program. New Brunswick asked for and received $0.

In 2022, CBC News and Radio-Canada published an article described how J. D. Irving used a captive insurance company based in Bermuda to insure its vessels, which allowed it to accrue $13.4 million in untaxed profits over a thirty-year period from 1973 to 2001. Use of captive insurance strategies is legal and common among multinational companies. Higgs responded to the news at the legislature by stating that he would not make modifications to provincial policies, stating that "because the tax strategies used by the companies were legal, there are no grounds for banning them from receiving government grants, loans or other subsidies."

=== Equalization ===
Higgs raised the idea of cutting equalization payments made to 'have-not provinces', including New Brunswick during a First Ministers' meeting in Montreal in 2018. The New Brunswick government budgeted for $1.8-billion worth of equalization transfers in 2018-19. Without 30 per cent of the budget coming through federal transfer payments, Higgs suggested attitudes might change about resource development.

=== Labour ===
Higgs's government oversaw the Canadian Union of Public Employees (CUPE) strike in October and November 2021. About 20,000 workers in the education, health, transportation and infrastructure sectors went on strike for 16 days. On November 14, Higgs's government reached a deal with CUPE. The agreement included raising wages for the workers.

=== First Nations ===
In 2020, some First Nations chiefs urged the provincial government to call an inquiry into systemic racism following the separate police-involved shootings of Chantel Moore and Rodney Levi. The chiefs later walked out on a meeting with Higgs following his refusal to commit to an independent inquiry, stating that they were 'losing faith' in him. In 2021, Aboriginal Affairs Minister Arlene Dunn announced that the provincial government would hire an independent commissioner to examine systemic racism, rather than call a public inquiry. Indigenous leaders called the provincial government's plan a "profound disappointment."

In 2021, the provincial government pulled out of tax-sharing agreements with 13 Mi'kmaq and Wolastoqey First Nations without consultation.

In 2021, following a major land title claim filed by Wolastoqey Chiefs, Higgs alleged that title claim "impacts every single land owner" in the province by claiming title to "private lands of any kind" with "no limits". Higgs further stated that the lawsuit might lead to Indigenous people winning control of 60 per cent of the province's land, including private homes and businesses. However, the chief's statement of claims filed with the court only listed five forestry companies, NB Power, and the federal and provincial governments.

In 2021, New Brunswick's Attorney General Ted Flemming sent a memo to government employees which asked them to cease making indigenous territorial acknowledgements that made reference to 'unceded' or 'unsurrendered' land. "As a result of this litigation, legal counsel for GNB and the Office of the Attorney General has advised that GNB employees may not make or issue territorial or title acknowledgements. This includes the use of territorial acknowledgements at meetings and events, in documents, and in email signatures." This policy faced growing backlash, including within the Premier's own cabinet. A leaked series of emails revealed Education Minister Dominic Cardy and Transportation Minister Jill Green wrote to the premier complaining that the new policy was causing unnecessary conflict and "creates the impression of a government intentionally reinforcing racist behaviour."

=== COVID-19 pandemic ===
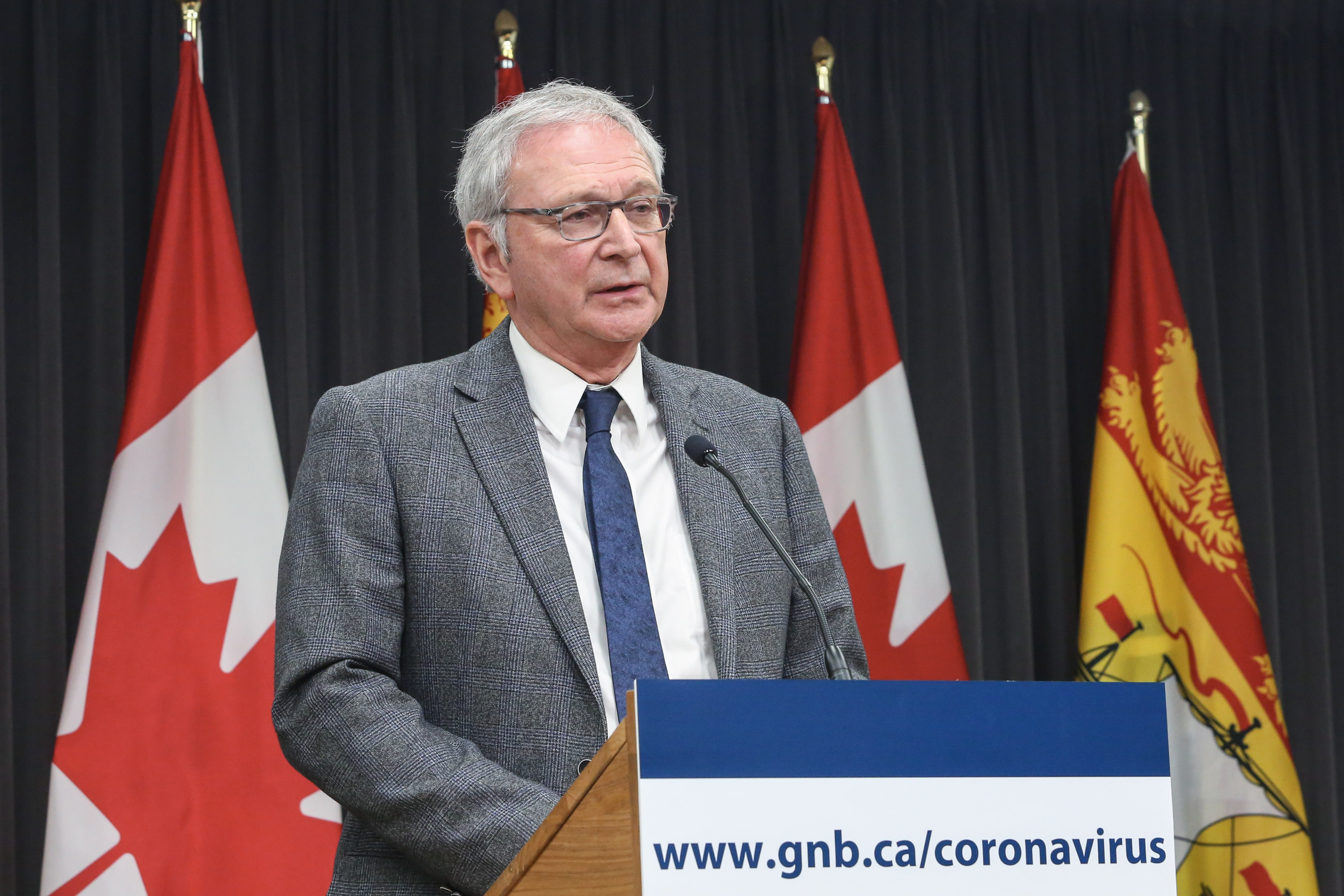
Higgs making a COVID-19 announcement in March 2020

Higgs led the provincial government response to the COVID-19 pandemic in New Brunswick. On March 19, 2020, the government declared a state of emergency. Higgs tested positive for COVID-19 on December 31, 2021.

=== 2020 re-election ===
Higgs argued that stability in government was required for the next phase of the COVID-19 pandemic and economic recovery. The snap election was called on August 17, 2020. Higgs and the Progressive Conservatives were re-elected to a majority government in the 2020 provincial election held on September 14.

=== Fiscal activities ===
The Higgs government has been praised by credit rating agencies, public policy think tanks, and media outlets for consistently generating surpluses and paying down the provincial debt, which had progressively increased due to annual deficits that began in the 2007-2008 fiscal year. As at March 31, 2018 (the first financial statement released after Higgs' government was sworn-in), the provincial debt was $13.9 billion, and as at March 31, 2024 it was down to $11.8 billion.

In 2022, Moody's Ratings upgraded the province's credit rating from Aa2 with a stable outlook to Aa2 with a positive outlook, and in 2024 upgraded its credit rating to Aa1 with a stable outlook. S&P Global Ratings' credit rating of A+ with a stable outlook was upgraded to A+ with a positive outlook in 2023, with the agency stating that "the positive outlook reflects the strength in fiscal results stemming from the government's demonstrated commitment to prudency, which we expect will continue to support operating surpluses and contribute to a relatively stable debt burden in the next two years." In 2022, the Fraser Institute ranked Higgs first among Canadian premiers in an analysis of each province's fiscal performance. The analysis was based on three metrics: Government spending, taxation, and deficits and debt. Higgs ranked first in both the government spending and deficits and debt categories, and seventh in taxation. The Higgs government's sixth consecutive balanced budget in 2024 was applauded by the Canadian Taxpayers Federation, and the National Post stated that "New Brunswick leads the way on common sense and fiscal restraint".

Although Higgs' government has consistently generated surpluses, such has not come without criticism. The opposition Liberals and Greens have argued that Higgs is not spending enough on public services, such as health care, education, and housing.

=== 2023 leadership turmoil ===
In May 2023, the Department of Education and Early Childhood Development announced that it was putting Policy 713 under review due to "concerns and misunderstandings of its implementation." In support of the review, Higgs stated that parents "deserve to be aware if their child goes by a different name or pronouns in school, even if the child hasn't come out to them" and that it was problematic for a child to "purposely" hide their identity from their parents. On June 8, 2023, the government revised the policy's sections under self-identification, sports participation and universal spaces.

Some groups have criticized the government's revisions to Policy 713, stating that it facilitates forced premature outing, misgendering, and deadnaming and promotes homophobia and transphobia. However, polling has shown that a large majority of Canadians (including 69% of those in Atlantic Canada) support policies requiring schools to inform parents of their child's desire to change gender or use new gender pronouns.

On June 15, Minister of Social Development Dorothy Shephard resigned from cabinet after voting for an opposition motion calling for further studies on Policy 713. In subsequent media interviews, she cited frustration with Higgs' leadership approach as the reason for her resignation, with his management of Policy 713 being the culmination of her frustrations.

Higgs has received at least a dozen letters from his own party, including current party members and riding association presidents, to trigger a leadership review. Some letters were ruled invalid without explanation. The provincial council will vote to schedule a convention once they receive enough letters.

Throughout early 2024, multiple Progressive Conservative politicians such as Arlene Dunn, Mike Holland, Jeff Carr, Daniel Allain, Shephard as well as Trevor Holder have all made announcements either resigning or opting out of running for re-election. Carr, who made his announcement in February, made an additional note claiming that the Progressive Conservative party had changed under Higgs. Allain expressed his disagreement with the party's newer involvement in social conservatism, considering it to go against the party's "natural instincts".

Higgs hired Steve Outhouse as his principal secretary and campaign manager for the 2024 New Brunswick general election. Outhouse, who previously campaigned for the re-election of Alberta Premier Danielle Smith, was paid a monthly salary of $20,776 in taxpayers' money, or $125,656 total by Higgs, which drew criticism from David Coon for being well above the average of around $150,000 to $175,000 annually.

== Electoral record ==
=== Quispamsis ===
2024 New Brunswick general election: Quispamsis
Party	Candidate	Votes	%	±%
Liberal	Aaron Kennedy	3,861	46.47	+29.5
Progressive Conservative	Blaine Higgs	3,668	44.15	-24.0
Green	Andrew Conradi	378	4.55	-1.8
New Democratic	Alex White	360	4.33	-1.7
Independent	David Raymond Amos	42	0.51	–
Total valid votes		8,309	99.72	
Total rejected ballots		23	0.28	
Turnout		8,332	71.93	
Eligible voters		11,584		
Liberal gain from Progressive Conservative		Swing		+26.8
Source: Elections New Brunswick

2024 New Brunswick general election
Party	Candidate	Votes	%	±%
Liberal	Aaron Kennedy	3,860	46.5	
Progressive Conservative	Blaine Higgs	3,667	44.1	
Green	Andrew Conradi	378	4.6	
New Democratic	Alex White	360	4.3	+3.09
Independent	David Raymond Amos	42	0.5	
Total valid votes		8,307		
Total rejected ballots				
Turnout				
Eligible voters				
Liberal gain		Swing		
Source: Elections New Brunswick

2020 New Brunswick general election
Party	Candidate	Votes	%	±%
Progressive Conservative	Blaine Higgs	5,697	68.11	+11.23
Liberal	Robert Hunt	1,225	14.64	-10.55
Green	Addison Fach	528	6.31	+0.92
New Democratic	Caitlin Grogan	501	5.99	+3.09
People's Alliance	Sara Hall	414	4.95	-4.69
Total valid votes		8,365		
Total rejected ballots		24	0.29	+0.13
Turnout		8,389	69.86	+1.69
Eligible voters		12,008		
Progressive Conservative hold		Swing		+11.23
Source: Elections New Brunswick

2018 New Brunswick general election
Party	Candidate	Votes	%	±%
Progressive Conservative	Blaine Higgs	4,691	56.87	+5.52
Liberal	Aaron Kennedy	2,078	25.19	-6.41
People's Alliance	Keith Porter	795	9.64	+8.13
Green	Mark Woolsey	445	5.40	+2.25
New Democratic	Ryan Jewkes	239	2.90	-9.50
Total valid votes		8248	100.0	
Total rejected ballots		13	0.16	
Turnout		8261	69.89	
Eligible voters		11,820		
Progressive Conservative notional gain		Swing		+5.97
Source: Elections New Brunswick

2014 New Brunswick general election
Party	Candidate	Votes	%	±%
Progressive Conservative	Blaine Higgs	3,884	51.35	+0.68
Liberal	Mary Schryer	2,390	31.60	-2.61
New Democratic	Angela-Jo "AJ" Griffin	938	12.40	+0.99
Green	Patrick Kemp	238	3.15	-0.55
People's Alliance	Brandon Gardner	114	1.51	–
Total valid votes		7,564	100.0	
Total rejected ballots		19	0.25	
Turnout		7,583	64.76	
Eligible voters		11,710		
Progressive Conservative notional hold		Swing		+1.64
Source: Elections New Brunswick

2010 New Brunswick general election
Party	Candidate	Votes	%	±%
Progressive Conservative	Blaine Higgs	4,076	50.67	+6.69
Liberal	Mary Schryer	2,752	34.21	-17.08
New Democratic	Matthew Doherty	918	11.41	+6.68
Green	Mark Woolsey	298	3.70	–
Total valid votes		8,044	100.0	
Total rejected ballots		30	0.37	
Turnout		8,074	69.29	
Eligible voters		11,652		
Progressive Conservative gain from Liberal		Swing		+11.88
Source: Elections New Brunswick
