= Efficiency New Brunswick =

Efficiency New Brunswick (more formally the Energy Efficiency and Conservation Agency of New Brunswick) was a crown corporation in the Canadian province of New Brunswick responsible for energy efficiency grants to New Brunswickers. The first president and CEO was Elizabeth Weir. In May 2012, Margaret-Ann Blaney resigned her position as Rothesay MLA to assume responsibility as new president and CEO.

Efficiency New Brunswick was merged into the provincial utility company NB Power in 2015, who now delivers efficiency programs centrally.
