= Brenda Fowlie =

Canadian politician

Member of the Legislative Assembly of New Brunswick
- In office 1999 – September 2006

New Brunswick Minister of Environment and Local Government
- In office June 27, 2003 – July 21, 2005

New Brunswick Minister of Energy
- In office February 13, 2006 – September 2006

Member of the Quispamsis Town Council
- In office 1993–1999

Personal details
- Born: May 15, 1953 (age 73) Quispamsis, New Brunswick

Brenda Olive Fowlie (born May 15, 1953) is a journalist and politician in the Canadian province of New Brunswick. She was formerly a member of the Legislative Assembly of New Brunswick and a member of the cabinet.

A resident of Quispamsis, New Brunswick, Fowlie was first elected to the legislature in the 1999 election and was re-elected in 2003 by a very narrow margin. She was originally declared the winner in 2003 by a margin of 16 votes and a recount delayed the swearing in of the cabinet and the first session of the legislature. The results of the election were so close that Fowlie's uncertain victory meant the difference between a majority government for her Progressive Conservative Party of New Brunswick and a tie in seats with the PCs and the opposition New Brunswick Liberal Association. The recount reaffirmed her victory increasing her margin to 18 votes.

Prior to her election to the legislature, Fowlie had been a member of her local school board and was elected to Quispamsis town council in 1995 and re-elected in 1998. She wrote a column for local newspapers and hosted several news and public affairs programs on public access television.

She was sworn into cabinet as the Minister of Environment and Local Government on June 27, 2003 and resigned from cabinet on July 21, 2005 after the provincial ombudsman reported she had violated provincial privacy laws when she used personal information, from her department, on fellow MLA Stuart Jamieson to attack his character in the legislature and to reporters. She made a quick political recovery however when she was re-added to cabinet on February 14, 2006 as Minister of Energy.

She was defeated in her bid for a third term in the 2006 election and thus left the legislature and the cabinet.

New Brunswick provincial government of Bernard Lord
Cabinet posts (2)
Predecessor	Office	Successor
Bruce Fitch	Minister of Energy; 2006	Jack Keir
Kim Jardine	Minister of Environment and Local Government; 2003–2005; Graham was Acting Minister	Dale Graham
Special Cabinet Responsibilities
Predecessor	Title	Successor
none	Minister responsible for the Energy Efficiency and Conservation Agency; 2006 new designation	Jack Keir
