= Grey Party of Canada =

- Leader: Jim Webb
- Founded: January 2002
- Dissolved: October 22, 2004
- Headquarters: New Brunswick
- Ideology: Elder rights

The Grey Party of Canada was a political party in Canada. The party was a protest movement started by senior citizens who want to make views known on specific issues including tax credits for seniors, saving Medicare, and free medications for seniors.

The Grey Party was founded in January 2002 by Jim Webb of New Brunswick, who once ran federally for the Confederation of Regions Party in Saint John, New Brunswick and twice for the New Brunswick Confederation of Regions Party in the provincial riding of Saint John Lancaster.

In the 2003 New Brunswick general election, the party nominated 10 candidates in the province's 55 ridings, including 23-year-old Mark LeBlanc who ran in the riding of Saint John Kings. At the time, having a 23-year-old candidate for a senior-focused party was a newsmaker. Grey Party candidates received 1,550 votes (0.4% of the popular vote).

The party was deregistered by Elections New Brunswick on October 22, 2004.

== See also ==
- List of political parties in Canada
- Manitoba Grey Party
