= Elections New Brunswick =

Non-partisan election agency in New Brunswick, Canada

Agency overview
- Formed: 1967
- Jurisdiction: Provincial and municipal elections in New Brunswick
- Headquarters: 545 Two Nations Crossing; Fredericton, New Brunswick
- Employees: 15 staff
- Agency executive: Kimberly A. Poffenroth, Chief Electoral Officer
- Website: Elections New Brunswick website

Elections New Brunswick (French: Élections Nouveau-Brunswick) is the non-partisan agency of the Legislative Assembly of New Brunswick charged with running provincial elections, municipal elections, district education council and regional health authority elections in New Brunswick, Canada. The chief electoral officer oversees the electoral process and reports to the New Brunswick legislature. The chief electoral officer is not permitted to vote in elections during his or her term.

Elections New Brunswick reports annually to the legislative assembly and is charged with implementing the Election Act (1973), Municipal Elections Act (1979), and the Political Process Financing Act (1978).

== Chief electoral officers ==
List of chief electoral officers of New Brunswick
Name	In office	
Donald Whalen	1967	1972
Lloyd H. Nickerson	1972	1984
Luc LeBrun	1984	1987
Scovil S. Hoyt	1987	1991
Henry G. Irwin	1991	1991
Barbara J. Landry	1991	2000
Annise Hollies	2000	2007
Michael P. Quinn	2007	2017
Kimberly A. Poffenroth	2017	Present

== See also ==
- List of political parties in New Brunswick
