= 61st New Brunswick Legislature =

Political members in New Brunswick, Canada

- Majority parliament

Parliament leaders
- Premier: Hon. Susan Holt; Nov. 2, 2024 – present

Party caucuses
- Government: Liberal Party
- Opposition: Progressive Conservative Party
- Recognized: Green Party

Legislative Assembly
- Speaker of the Assembly: Francine Landry
- Members: 49 MLA seats

Sovereign
- Monarch: Charles III; 8 September 2022 – present
- Lieutenant governor: Brenda Murphy; 8 September 2019 – 22 January 2025
- Louise Imbeault; 22 January 2025 – present
← 60th

The 61st New Brunswick Legislative Assembly consists of the members elected in the 2024 New Brunswick general election. The Liberals won a majority.

== Members ==
Member	Party	Electoral district	First elected/previously elected	Notes
Sherry Wilson	Progressive Conservative	Albert-Riverview	2010	
Don Monahan	Progressive Conservative	Arcadia-Butternut Valley-Maple Hills	2024	
René Legacy	Liberal	Bathurst	2020	
Benoît Bourque	Liberal	Beausoleil-Grand-Bouctouche-Kent	2014	
Marco LeBlanc	Liberal	Belle-Baie-Belledune	2023	
Isabelle Thériault	Liberal	Caraquet	2018	
Margaret Johnson	Progressive Conservative	Carleton-Victoria	2020	
Richard Ames	Progressive Conservative	Carleton-York	2020	
Lyne Chantal Boudreau	Liberal	Champdoré-Irishtown	2024	
Natacha Vautour	Liberal	Dieppe-Memramcook	2024	
Jean-Claude D'Amours	Liberal	Edmundston-Vallée-des-Rivières	2018	
Kris Austin	Progressive Conservative	Fredericton-Grand Lake	2018 (Note: First elected as a People's Alliance)	Former People's Alliance leader
David Coon	Green	Fredericton-Lincoln	2014	Leader of Green party
Luke Randall	Liberal	Fredericton North	2024	
Susan Holt	Liberal	Fredericton South-Silverwood	2023	Leader of Liberal Party/Premier
Ryan Cullins	Progressive Conservative	Fredericton-York	2020	
Ian Lee	Progressive Conservative	Fundy-The Isles-Saint John Lorneville	2024	
Chuck Chiasson	Liberal	Grand Falls-Vallée-des-Rivières-Saint-Quentin	2014	
John Herron	Liberal	Hampton-Fundy-St. Martins	2024	
Cindy Miles	Liberal	Hanwell-New Maryland	2024	
Luc Robichaud	Liberal	Hautes-Terres-Nepisiguit	2024	
Pat Finnigan	Liberal	Kent North	2024	
Bill Oliver	Progressive Conservative	Kings Centre	2014	
Francine Landry	Liberal	Madawaska Les Lacs-Edmundston	2014	Speaker
Sam Johnston	Liberal	Miramichi Bay-Neguac	2024	
Michelle Conroy	Progressive Conservative	Miramichi East	2018	
Michael Dawson	Progressive Conservative	Miramichi West	2022	Resigned in 2025
Kevin Russell	Progressive Conservative	Miramichi West	2025	Elected through a by-election in 2025
Rob McKee	Liberal	Moncton Centre	2018	
Alexandre Cédric Doucet	Liberal	Moncton East	2024	
Tania Sodhi	Liberal	Moncton Northwest	2024	
Claire Johnson	Liberal	Moncton South	2024	
Mary Wilson	Progressive Conservative	Oromocto-Sunbury	2018	
Aaron Kennedy	Liberal	Quispamsis	2024	
Guy H. Arseneault	Liberal	Restigouche East	2018	
Gilles LePage	Liberal	Restigouche West	2014	
Rob Weir	Progressive Conservative	Riverview	2024	
Alyson Townsend	Liberal	Rothesay	2024	
Kathy Bockus	Progressive Conservative	Saint Croix	2020	
Glen Savoie	Progressive Conservative	Saint John East	2010, 2014	Interim Leader of Progressive Conservative Party/Leader of The Opposition
David Hickey	Liberal	Saint John Harbour	2024	
John Dornan	Liberal	Saint John Portland-Simonds	2024	
Kate Elman Wilcott	Liberal	Saint John West-Lancaster	2024	
Robert Gauvin	Liberal	Shediac Bay-Dieppe	2018 (Note: First elected as Progressive Conservative)	
Jacques LeBlanc	Liberal	Shediac-Cap-Acadie	2018	
Eric Mallet	Liberal	Shippagan-Les-Îles	2020	
Tammy Scott-Wallace	Progressive Conservative	Sussex-Three Rivers	2020	
Megan Mitton	Green	Tantramar	2018	
Keith Chiasson	Liberal	Tracadie	2018	
Bill Hogan	Progressive Conservative	Woodstock-Hartland	2020	
