= 2026 Progressive Conservative Party of New Brunswick leadership election =

Canadian provincial leadership election

- October 17, 2026

4,464
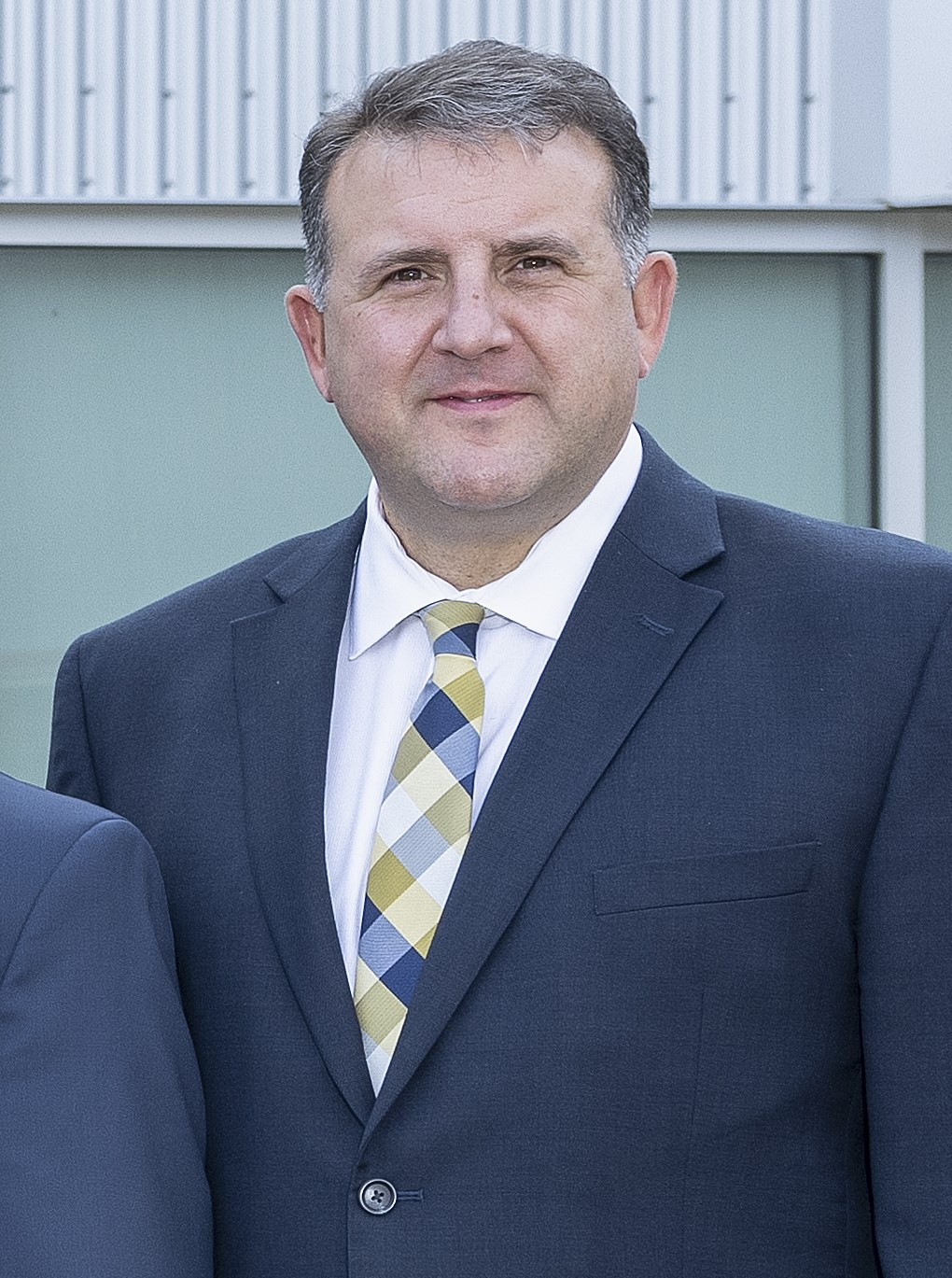
		DM
Candidate	Daniel Allain	Don Monahan
Results	2,543 (58.6%)	1,797 (41.4%)
leader before election
Glen Savoie (interim)
Elected leader
Daniel Allain

2026 Progressive Conservative Party of New Brunswick leadership election
- Date: October 17, 2026
- Resigning leader: Blaine Higgs
- Won by: Daniel Allain
- Ballots: 1
- Candidates: 2
- Entrance fee: $35,000
- Spending limit: $250,000

In 2026, the Progressive Conservative Party of New Brunswick held a leadership election choosing Daniel Allain as permanent leader, replacing Glen Savoie, who became leader on an interim basis following the resignation of Blaine Higgs. Higgs announced his resignation after being defeated in the 2024 New Brunswick general election.

== Timeline ==
- October 21, 2024 – Blaine Higgs, the leader of the party since 2016 and premier of New Brunswick since 2018, was defeated at the 2024 general election. He resigned as leader after being unseated in his own district. The party lost nine seats at the election, with a total of 16 seats remaining.
- October 28, 2024 – Saint John East MLA Glen Savoie was announced as interim party leader.
- May 13, 2025 – Leadership election rules adopted by the party's provincial council.
- October 18, 2025 – Former Moncton East MLA Daniel Allain announces his candidacy.
- October 20, 2025 – Campaign period start date.
- February 7, 2026 – Arcadia-Butternut Valley-Maple Hills MLA Don Monahan announces his candidacy.
- June 19, 2026 – Candidate application deadline.
- July 17, 2026 – Candidate review deadline.
- July 31, 2026 – Ballot qualification deadline for approved candidates.
- August 14, 2026 – Last day to join the party to vote.
- October 17, 2026 – Leadership convention takes place.

== Rules ==
The election rules were announced in May 2025. To qualify on the ballot, candidates need to collect 500 endorsements from party members, with regional considerations. They also need to donate at least $35,000 to the party and abide by a spending limit of $250,000. Voting will be conducted by mail, using a ranked choice voting system.

== Candidates ==
=== Declared ===
- Daniel Allain, MLA Moncton East (2020–2024), former Minister of Local Government and Local Governance Reform (2020–2023) (declared on October 18, 2025)
- Don Monahan, MLA Arcadia-Butternut Valley-Maple Hills (declared on February 7, 2026)

=== Declined ===
- Kris Austin, MLA for Fredericton-Grand Lake (2018–present), former Minister of Public Safety (2022–2024), former leader of the People's Alliance of New Brunswick (2010–2022)
- Glen Savoie, MLA for Saint John East (2010–2014, 2014–present), Leader of the Opposition in New Brunswick (2024–present), interim leader of the Progressive Conservative Party of New Brunswick (2024–present), former Minister of Local Government (2023–2024)

== Endorsements ==
Endorsements of Daniel Allain

Current MLAs (7)

- Kathy Bockus, MLA for Saint Croix (2020–present)
- Michelle Conroy, MLA for Miramichi (2018-2024), Miramichi East (2024-present)
- Margaret Johnson, MLA for Carleton-Victoria (2020-present)
- Bill Oliver, MLA for Kings Centre (2014–present)
- Kevin Russell, MLA for Miramichi West (2025–present)
- Tammy Scott-Wallace, MLA for Sussex-Fundy-St. Martins (2020–2024), Sussex-Three Rivers (2024–present)
- Rob Weir, MLA for Riverview (2024–present)

Current MPs (1)

- Mike Dawson, MP for Miramichi—Grand Lake (2025–present) and MLA for Southwest Miramichi-Bay du Vin (2022–2024), Miramichi West (2024–2025)

Former MLAs (30)

- David Alward, 32nd premier of New-Brunswick (2010-2014) and MLA for Woodstock (1999-2014)
- John Betts, MLA for Moncton Crescent (1999-2014)
- Norman Betts, MLA for Southwest Miramichi (1999-2003)
- Gary Crossman, MLA for Hampton (2014-2024)
- Benoît Cyr, MLA for Restigouche West (1999-2003)
- Bruce Fitch, MLA for Riverview (2003–2024)
- Stewart Fairgrieve, MLA for Carleton (2015-2020)
- Ted Flemming, MLA for Rothesay (2012–2024)
- Peter Forbes, MLA for Fredericton North (1999-2003)
- Dale Graham, MLA for Carleton North (1993-1995) and Carleton (1995-2014)
- Mike Holland, MLA for Albert (2018–2024)
- Brian Keirstead, MLA for Albert (2014-2018)
- Carl Killen, MLA for Saint John Harbour (2010-2014)
- Craig Leonard, MLA for Fredericton-Lincoln (2010-2014)
- Claude Landry, MLA for Tracadie-Sheila (2006–2014)
- Kirk MacDonald, MLA for Mactaquac (1999-2006), York North (2006-2014) and Fredericton York (2014-2018)
- Louis-Philippe McGraw, MLA for Centre Péninsule (1999-2003)
- Wes McLean, MLA for Victoria-Tobique (2010–2014)
- Percy Mockler, MLA for Madawaska South (1982-1987), Madawaska-la-Vallée (1995-2006), Restigouche-La-Vallée (2006-2009) and Canadian Senator (2009-2024)
- Jean-Pierre Ouellet, MLA for Madawaska-les-Lacs (1974-1987)
- Rose-May Poirier, MLA for Rogersville-Kouchibouguac (1999–2010) and Canadian Senator (2010-present)
- Paul Robichaud, MLA for Lamèque-Shippagan-Miscou (1999-2014)
- Réjean Savoie, MLA for Miramichi Bay-Neguac (1999–2003, 2022–2024)
- Ernie Steeves, MLA for Moncton Northwest (2014–2024)
- Robert Trevors, MLA for Miramichi Centre (2010-2014)
- Greg Turner, MLA for Moncton South (2020–2024)
- Carl Urquhart, MLA for York (2006-2010), Carleton York (2014-2020)
- Claude Williams, MLA for Kent South (2001-2014)
- Rodney Weston, MLA for Saint John-Fundy (1999–2003) and MP for Saint John—Kennebecasis (2008–2015)
- Ross Wetmore, MLA for Grand Lake-Gagetown (2010–2014), Gagetown-Petitcodiac (2014–2024)

Former MPs (2)

- Mike Allen, MP for Tobique-Mataquac (2006-2015)
- Robert Goguen, MP for Moncton-Riverview-Dieppe (2011-2015)
Endorsements of Don Monahan

Current MLAs (6)

- Richard Ames, MLA for Carleton-York (2020–present)
- Kris Austin, MLA for Fredericton-Grand Lake (2018–present) and former People's Alliance of New Brunswick leader (2010–2022)
- Ryan Cullins, MLA for Fredericton-York (2020-present)
- Ian Lee, MLA for Fundy-The Isles-Saint John Lorneville (2024-present)
- Mary Wilson, MLA for Oromocto-Sunbury (2024–present), Oromocto-Lincoln-Fredericton (2018–2024)
- Sherry Wilson, MLA for Albert-Riverview (2024–present), Moncton Southwest (2014–2024), Petitcodiac (2010–2014)

Former MLAs (4)

- Blaine Higgs, 34th premier of New-Brunswick (2018-2024) and MLA for Quispamsis (2010-2024)
- Kim Jardine, MLA for Miramichi Centre (1999-2003)
- Curtis Malloch, MLA for Charlotte-Campobello (2010-2014)
- Jake Stewart, MLA for Southwest Miramichi (2010–2014), Southwest Miramichi-Bay du Vin (2014–2021) and MP for Miramichi—Grand Lake (2021–2025)

== Membership ==
It was reported by Adam Huras of the Telegraph-Journal that as of the membership deadline, 5,632 people were PC members. Allain signed up 2,815 members and Monahan signed up 2,357. 460 members were unattached to either campaign.

== Opinion polling ==
Leader preference among PC supporters

Polling Firm	Date of Polling	Link	Allain	Monahan	Neither of these candidates	Unsure
Abacus Data	July 29–August 7, 2026		24%	13%	11%	51%

Leader preference among all voters

Polling Firm	Date of Polling	Link	Allain	Monahan	Neither of these candidates	Unsure
Abacus Data	July 29–August 7, 2026		15%	9%	20%	56%
Clear Impact Strategy	July 2026		26%	14%	18%	42%

== Results ==
	First Ballot	
Candidate	Total votes	
Daniel Allain	2,543	58.6
Don Monahan	1,797	41.4
Totals	100.0%	

Turnout was 79.26% (4,464 total votes cast). 118 of the ballots were deemed incomplete and six people chose to invalidate their vote. There were 5,632 eligible voters.

== Aftermath ==
Because Allain does not hold a seat in the Legislative Assembly, he picked Margaret Johnson to serve as the opposition leader.

Following the convention, members of the governing Liberal caucus began using the term "Higgs-Allain government" to tie Allain into the previous administration, despite the public falling out between Allain and Higgs that resulted in his removal from cabinet over Policy 713.

== See also ==
- 2026 Canadian electoral calendar
- Progressive Conservative Party of New Brunswick leadership elections
