= 42nd New Brunswick general election =

Canadian provincial election

- On or before October 16, 2028

49 seats in the Legislative Assembly of New Brunswick 25 seats needed for a majority
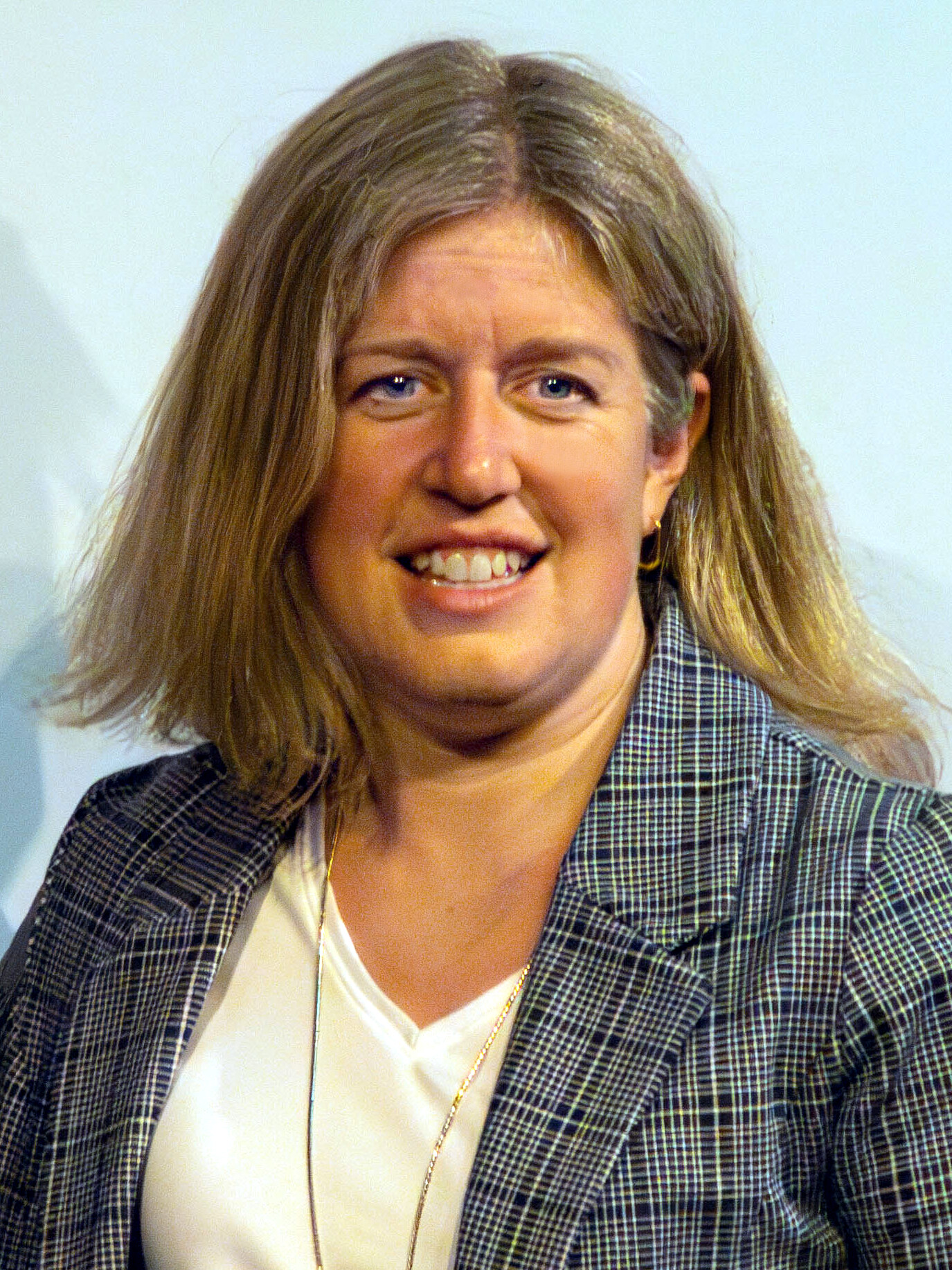

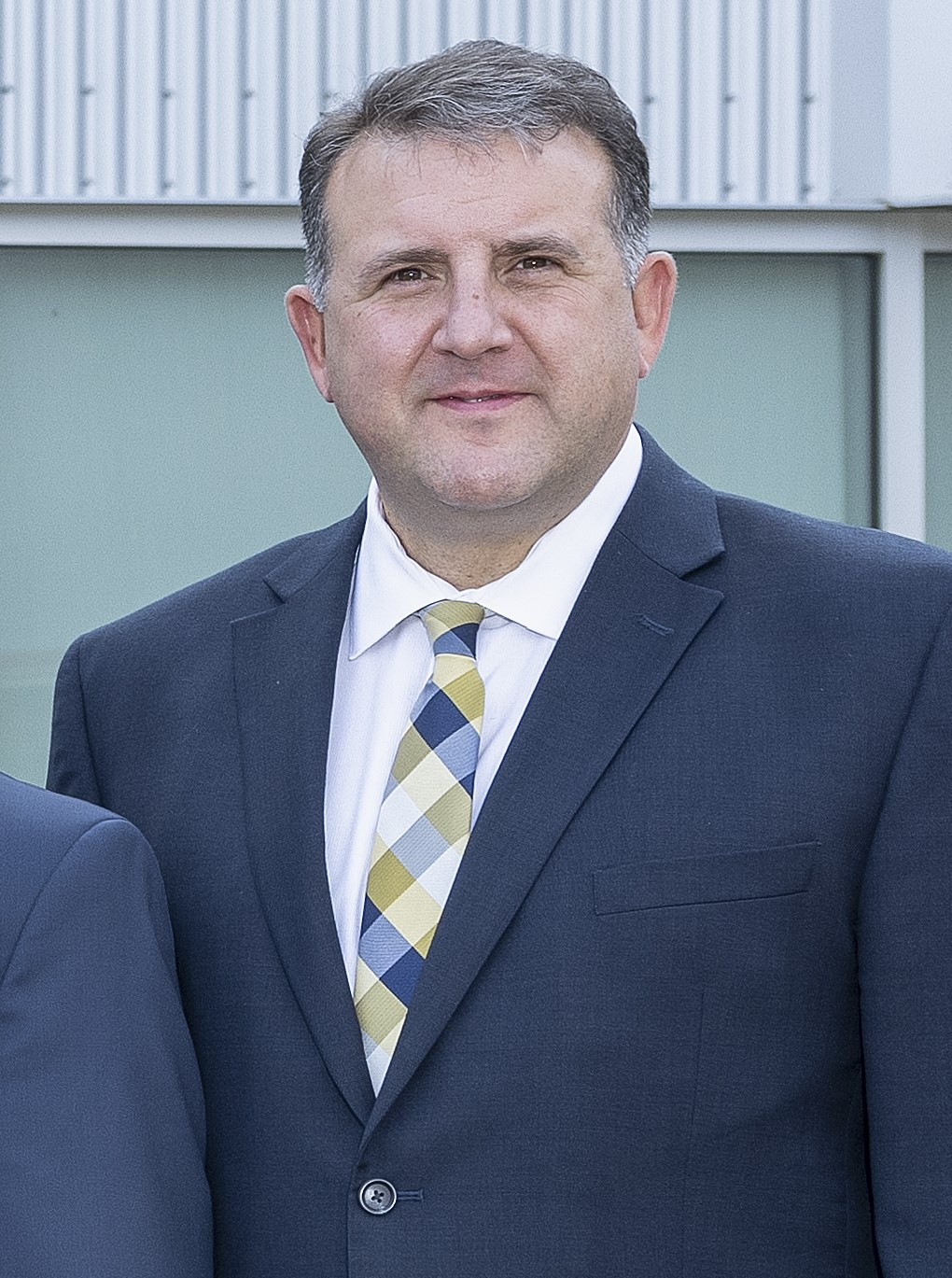

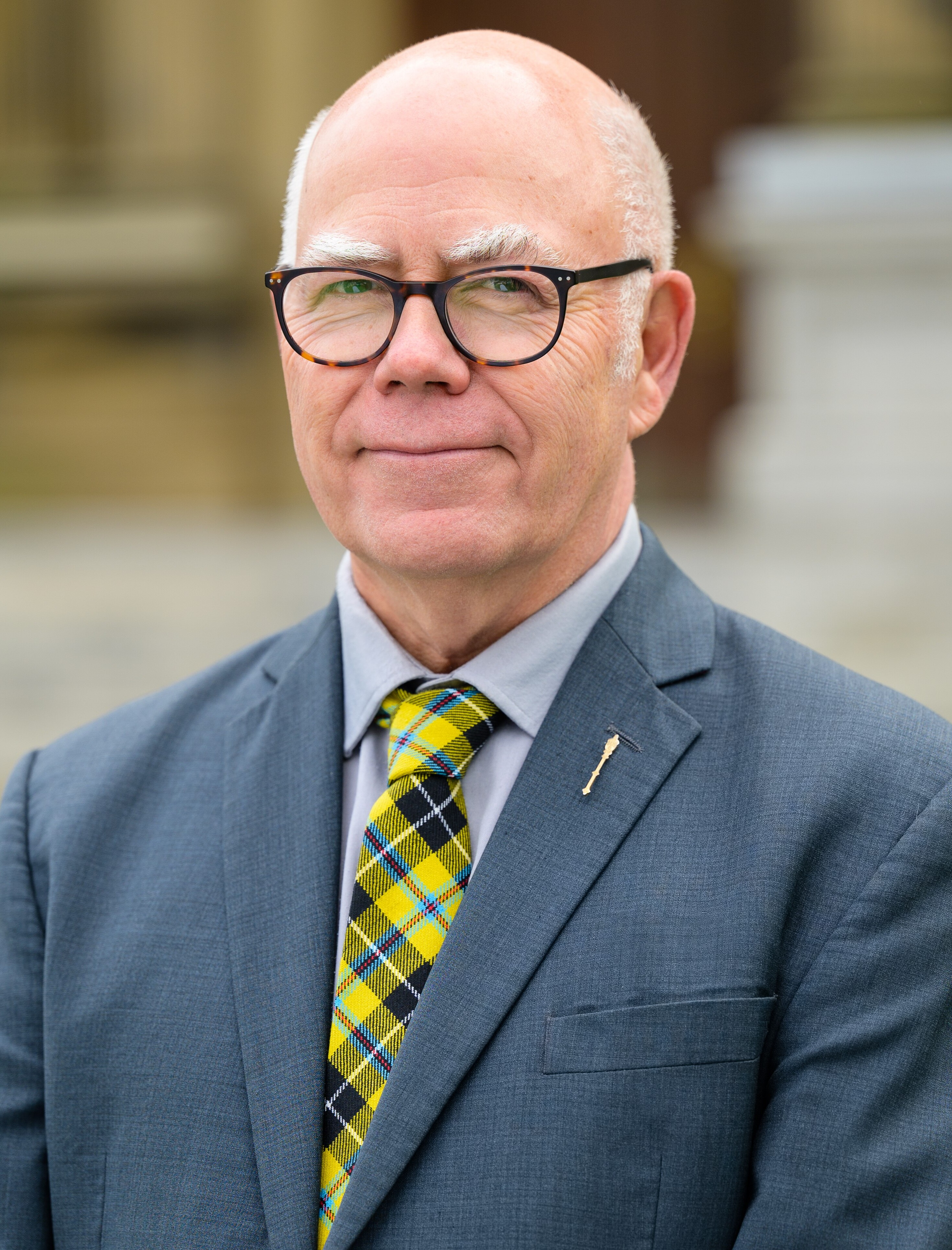
| Leader | Susan Holt | Daniel Allain | David Coon (outgoing) |
| Party | Liberal | Progressive Conservative | Green |
| Leader since | August 6, 2022 | October 17, 2026 | September 22, 2012 |
| Leader's seat | Fredericton South-Silverwood | None | Fredericton-Lincoln |
| Last election | 31 seats, 48.24% | 16 seats, 35.04% | 2 seats, 13.76% |
| Current seats | 31 | 16 | 2 |
Incumbent Premier
Susan Holt
Liberal

The 42nd New Brunswick general election is scheduled to take place on or before October 16, 2028, according to the Legislative Assembly Act of 2017, which states that an election should be held every four years on the third Monday in October.

== Timeline ==
=== 2025 ===
- March 25, 2025: Miramichi West Progressive Conservative MLA Mike Dawson resigns from the legislature to become a federal election candidate.
- June 30, 2025: The People's Alliance of New Brunswick voluntarily deregisters.
- October 6, 2025: Progressive Conservative candidate Kevin Russell wins the Miramichi West by-election.

=== 2026 ===
- October 17, 2026: The Progressive Conservative Party of New Brunswick held a leadership election, electing Daniel Allain as party leader.

== Opinion polling ==
| Polling Firm | Last Date of Polling | Link | Liberal | PC | Green | NDP | Libertarian | Other | Margin of error | Sample size | Polling method | Lead |
|---|---|---|---|---|---|---|---|---|---|---|---|---|
| Abacus Data | 10 November 2026 | | 44 | 32 | 16 | 4 | – | 4 | ±3.98% | 606 | Online | 12 |
| Narrative Research | 28 September 2026 | | 46 | 30 | 13 | 7 | 3 | 1 | N/A | 506 | Online | 16 |
| Abacus Data | 7 August 2026 | | 45 | 31 | 14 | 4 | – | 5 | ±3.99% | 601 | Online | 14 |
| Narrative Research | 17 June 2026 | | 41 | 30 | 13 | 6 | 9 | 1 | N/A | 495 | Online | 11 |
| Porter O'Brien | 3 June 2026 | | 43 | 39 | 13 | – | – | 5 | ±3% | 802 | Online | 4 |
| Angus Reid | 1 December 2025 | | 49 | 32 | 11 | 4 | – | 5 | ±6% | 203 | Online | 17 |
| Porter O'Brien | 25 November 2025 | | 49 | 40 | 8 | – | – | 3 | N/A | 813 | Online | 9 |
| Abacus Data | 30 October 2025 | | 53 | 29 | 11 | 3 | – | 3 | ±4.0% | 600 | Online | 24 |
| Canadian Election Study | 13 May 2025 | | 54 | 28 | 5 | 8 | – | 4 | N/A | 254 | Online | 26 |
| Election 2024 | October 21, 2024 | HTML | 48.24 | 35.04 | 13.76 | 1.30 | 0.46 | 1.21 | —N/a | —N/a | —N/a | 13.20 |
