= 60th New Brunswick Legislature =

- Majority parliament
- October 7, 2020 – June 7, 2024

Parliament leaders
- Premier: Hon. Blaine Higgs; November 9, 2018 – November 2, 2024
- Leader of the Opposition: Roger Melanson; September 28, 2020 – September 21, 2022
- Rob McKee; September 21, 2022 – May 9, 2023
- Susan Holt; May 9, 2023 – November 2, 2024

Party caucuses
- Government: Progressive Conservative Party
- Opposition: Liberal Party
- Recognized: Green Party

Legislative Assembly
- Speaker of the Assembly: Hon. Bill Oliver; October 7, 2020 – present
- Members: 49 MLA seats

Sovereign
- Monarch: Elizabeth II; 6 February 1952 – 8 September 2022
- Charles III; 8 September 2022 – present
- Lieutenant Governor: Brenda Murphy; 8 September 2019 – 22 January 2025

Sessions
- 1st session October 7, 2020 – October 25, 2022
- 2nd session October 25, 2022 – October 17, 2023
- 3rd session October 17, 2023 – June 7, 2024
← 59th	→ 61st

The 60th New Brunswick Legislative Assembly consisted of the members elected in the 2020 New Brunswick general election. Its last session was held on June 7, 2024.

== Seating plan ==
	Legacy	Gauvin	Mallet				Arseneau
	LeBlanc	K.Chiasson	C.Chiasson	Bourque	LePage	D'Amours	Mitton	Conroy
	Arseneault	Thériault		McKEE	F.Landry		COON	Austin
Oliver
	Holder	G.Savoie	HIGGS	Steeves	Shephard	Flemming	Fitch	M.Wilson
	Crossman	Holland	Green	Dunn	Cardy	Scott-Wallace	Allain	Johnson
	Hogan	Wetmore	Conroy	Bockus	Cullins	Anderson-Mason	Turner	Ames
	Carr	S.Wilson	R.Savoie

== Members ==
Name	Party	Riding	First elected/previously elected	Notes
Mike Holland	Progressive Conservative	Albert	2018 g.e.	
Denis Landry	Liberal	Bathurst East-Nepisiguit-Saint-Isidore	1995 g.e. 2003 g.e.	
Susan Holt	Liberal	Bathurst East-Nepisiguit-Saint-Isidore	2023 b.e.	Leader of the Opposition
René Legacy	Liberal	Bathurst West-Beresford	2020 g.e.	
Guy Arseneault	Liberal	Campbellton-Dalhousie	2018 g.e.	
Isabelle Thériault	Liberal	Caraquet	2018 g.e.	
Bill Hogan	Progressive Conservative	Carleton	2020 g.e.	
Margaret Johnson	Progressive Conservative	Carleton-Victoria	2020 g.e.	
Richard Ames	Progressive Conservative	Carleton-York	2020 g.e.	
Roger Melanson	Liberal	Dieppe	2010 b.e.	
Richard Losier	Liberal	Dieppe	2023 b.e.	
Jean-Claude D'Amours	Liberal	Edmundston-Madawaska Centre	2018 g.e.	
Kris Austin	People's Alliance	Fredericton-Grand Lake	2018 g.e.	
Kris Austin	Progressive Conservative	Fredericton-Grand Lake	2018 g.e.	
Jill Green	Progressive Conservative	Fredericton North	2020 g.e.	
David Coon	Green	Fredericton South	2014 g.e.	Leader of the Third party
Dominic Cardy	Progressive Conservative	Fredericton West-Hanwell	2018 g.e.	
Dominic Cardy	Independent	Fredericton West-Hanwell	2018 g.e.	
Ryan Cullins	Progressive Conservative	Fredericton-York	2020 g.e.	
Andrea Anderson-Mason	Progressive Conservative	Fundy-The Isles-Saint John West	2018 g.e.	
Ross Wetmore	Progressive Conservative	Gagetown-Petitcodiac	2010 g.e.	
Gary Crossman	Progressive Conservative	Hampton	2014 g.e.	
Kevin Arseneau	Green	Kent North	2018 g.e.	
Benoît Bourque	Liberal	Kent South	2014 g.e.	
Bill Oliver	Progressive Conservative	Kings Centre	2014 g.e.	Speaker
Francine Landry	Liberal	Madawaska Les Lacs-Edmundston	2014 g.e.	
Megan Mitton	Green	Memramcook-Tantramar	2018 g.e.	
Michelle Conroy	People's Alliance	Miramichi	2018 g.e.	
Michelle Conroy	Progressive Conservative	Miramichi	2018 g.e.	
Lisa Harris	Liberal	Miramichi Bay-Neguac	2014 g.e.	
Réjean Savoie	Progressive Conservative	Miramichi Bay-Neguac	1999 g.e. 2022 b.e.	
Rob McKee	Liberal	Moncton Centre	2018 g.e.	
Daniel Allain	Progressive Conservative	Moncton East	2020 g.e.	
Ernie Steeves	Progressive Conservative	Moncton Northwest	2014 g.e.	
Greg Turner	Progressive Conservative	Moncton South	2020 g.e.	
Sherry Wilson	Progressive Conservative	Moncton Southwest	2010 g.e.	
Jeff Carr	Progressive Conservative	New Maryland-Sunbury	2014 g.e.	
Mary Wilson	Progressive Conservative	Oromocto-Lincoln-Fredericton	2018 g.e.	
Trevor Holder	Progressive Conservative	Portland-Simonds	1999 g.e.	
Blaine Higgs	Progressive Conservative	Quispamsis	2010 g.e.	Premier
Daniel Guitard	Liberal	Restigouche-Chaleur	2014 b.e.	
Marco LeBlanc	Liberal	Restigouche-Chaleur	2023 b.e.	
Gilles LePage	Liberal	Restigouche West	2014 g.e.	
Bruce Fitch	Progressive Conservative	Riverview	2003 g.e.	
Ted Flemming	Progressive Conservative	Rothesay	2012 by-e.	
Kathy Bockus	Progressive Conservative	Saint Croix	2020 g.e.	
Glen Savoie	Progressive Conservative	Saint John East	2010 g.e. 2014 by-e.	
Arlene Dunn	Progressive Conservative	Saint John Harbour	2020 g.e.	
Dorothy Shephard	Progressive Conservative	Saint John Lancaster	2010 g.e.	
Robert Gauvin	Liberal	Shediac Bay-Dieppe	2018 g.e. (Note: First elected as Progressive Conservative)	
Jacques LeBlanc	Liberal	Shediac-Beaubassin-Cap-Pelé	2018 g.e.	
Eric Mallet	Liberal	Shippagan-Lamèque-Miscou	2020 g.e.	
Jake Stewart	Progressive Conservative	Southwest Miramichi-Bay du Vin	2010 g.e.	
Michael Dawson	Progressive Conservative	Southwest Miramichi-Bay du Vin	2022 b.e.	
Tammy Scott-Wallace	Progressive Conservative	Sussex-Fundy-St. Martins	2020 g.e.	
Keith Chiasson	Liberal	Tracadie-Sheila	2018 g.e.	
Chuck Chiasson	Liberal	Victoria-La Vallée	2014 g.e.	
