= Gary Keating =

Canadian politician

Member of the New Brunswick Legislative Assembly for Saint John East
- In office September 22, 2014 – October 14, 2014
- Preceded by: Glen Savoie
- Succeeded by: Glen Savoie

Personal details
- Party: Liberal
- Occupation: school principal

Gary Keating is a former Canadian politician, who was elected to the Legislative Assembly of New Brunswick in the 2014 provincial election. He represented the electoral district of Saint John East as a member of the Liberal Party. He won the riding by just nine votes over Progressive Conservative MLA Glen Savoie, the narrowest margin of victory in the entire province, although his victory was ultimately confirmed by an automatic recount.

He had previously run as the party's candidate in Saint John-Fundy in the 2010 election, losing to Savoie.

Just three weeks after the election, Keating resigned his seat on October 14, 2014, announcing that after some personal reflection he had decided that public political life was "not for him" as it would entail too much time away from his family, and apologizing to the voters of Saint John East. Savoie won the resulting by-election.

Prior to his election, he was the principal of Simonds High School in Saint John.

== Electoral record ==
2010 New Brunswick general election
Party	Candidate	Votes	%	±%
Progressive Conservative	Glen Savoie	2,908	52.02	+14.17
Liberal	Gary Keating	1,734	31.02	-24.44
New Democratic	Lise Lennon	592	10.59	+3.90
Green	Mathew Ian Clark	185	3.31	–
People's Alliance	Glenn McAllister	171	3.06	–
Total valid votes		5,590	100.0	
Progressive Conservative gain from Liberal		Swing		+19.30

2014 New Brunswick general election
Party	Candidate	Votes	%	±%
Liberal	Gary Keating	2,332	37.02	+3.96
Progressive Conservative	Glen Savoie	2,323	36.88	-0.96
New Democratic	Phil Comeau	1,167	18.53	-5.16
Green	Sharon Murphy	353	5.60	+0.20
People's Alliance	Jason Inness	124	1.97	
Total valid votes		6,299	100.0	
Total rejected ballots		26	0.41	
Turnout		6,325	54.88	
Eligible voters		11,526		
Liberal notional gain from Progressive Conservative		Swing		+2.46
Voting results declared after judicial recount.
Source: Elections New Brunswick
