= Hanwell-New Maryland =

Provincial electoral district in New Brunswick, Canada

New Brunswick electoral district
- The riding of Hanwell-New Maryland (as it exists from 2023) in relation to other New Brunswick electoral districts

Provincial electoral district
- Legislature: Legislative Assembly of New Brunswick
MLA
Cindy Miles
Liberal
- District created: 2023
- First contested: 2024

Hanwell-New Maryland is a provincial electoral district for the Legislative Assembly of New Brunswick, Canada. It was first contested during the 2024 New Brunswick general election.

Hanwell-New Maryland was proposed in 2022 by the electoral boundaries commission and created out of the previous ridings of New Maryland-Sunbury and Fredericton West-Hanwell after being split into this riding and Fredericton South-Silverwood.

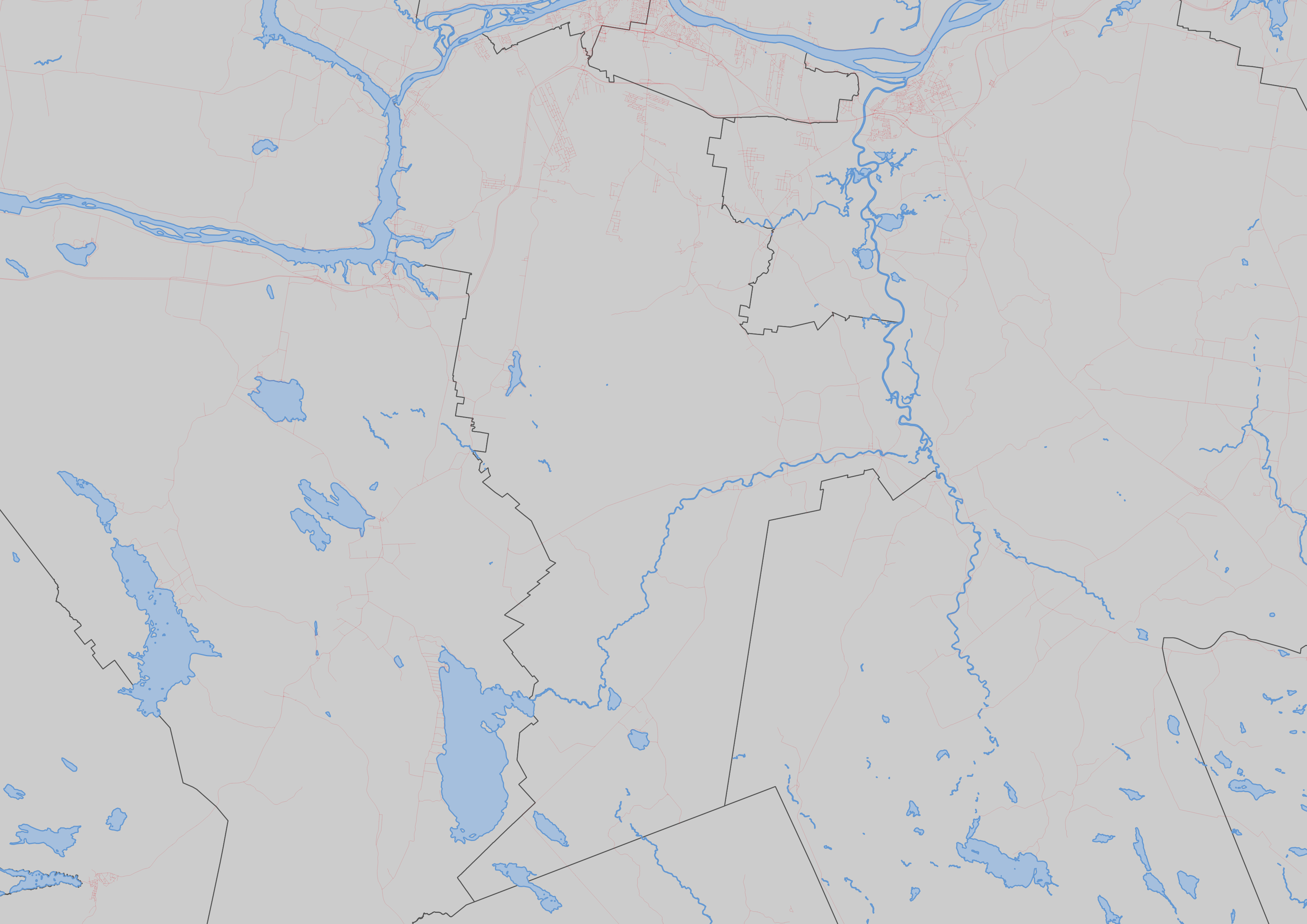
Hanwell-New Maryland (as it exists from 2023) and the roads in the riding

== Members of the Legislative Assembly ==
| Assembly | Years | Member | Party |
|---|---|---|---|
Riding created from Fredericton South
| 61st | 2024–Present | Cindy Miles | Liberal |

== Election results ==
2024 New Brunswick general election
** Preliminary results — Not yet official **
| Party | Candidate | Votes | % | ±% |
|---|---|---|---|---|
| Liberal | Cindy Miles | 4,006 | 42.76 | +27.5 |
| Progressive Conservative | Judy Wilson-Shee | 3,948 | 42.14 | -13.0 |
| Green | Susan Jonah | 1,051 | 11.22 | -6.4 |
| People's Alliance | Kris Hurtubise | 177 | 1.89 | -8.6 |
| New Democratic | Joël Cyr LaPlante | 119 | 1.27 | -0.2 |
| Libertarian | Meryl W. Sarty | 67 | 0.72 | |
| Total valid votes | | 9,368 | 99.84 | |
| Total rejected ballots | | 15 | 0.16 | |
| Turnout | | 9,383 | 74.97 | |
| Eligible voters | | 12,516 | | |
| Liberal notional gain from Progressive Conservative | | Swing | | +20.2 |
Source: Elections New Brunswick

2020 provincial election redistributed results
| Party | % |
|---|---|
| Progressive Conservative | 55.1 |
| Green | 17.6 |
| Liberal | 15.3 |
| People's Alliance | 10.5 |
| New Democratic | 1.5 |

== See also ==
- List of New Brunswick provincial electoral districts
- Canadian provincial electoral districts
