= Kevin Russell =

Kevin Russell may refer to:

- Kevin Russell (footballer) (born 1966), former football player and current manager
- Kevin Russell (musician) (born 1964), German singer
- Kevin Russell (politician), Canadian politician
