= Monique LeBlanc =

Canadian politician

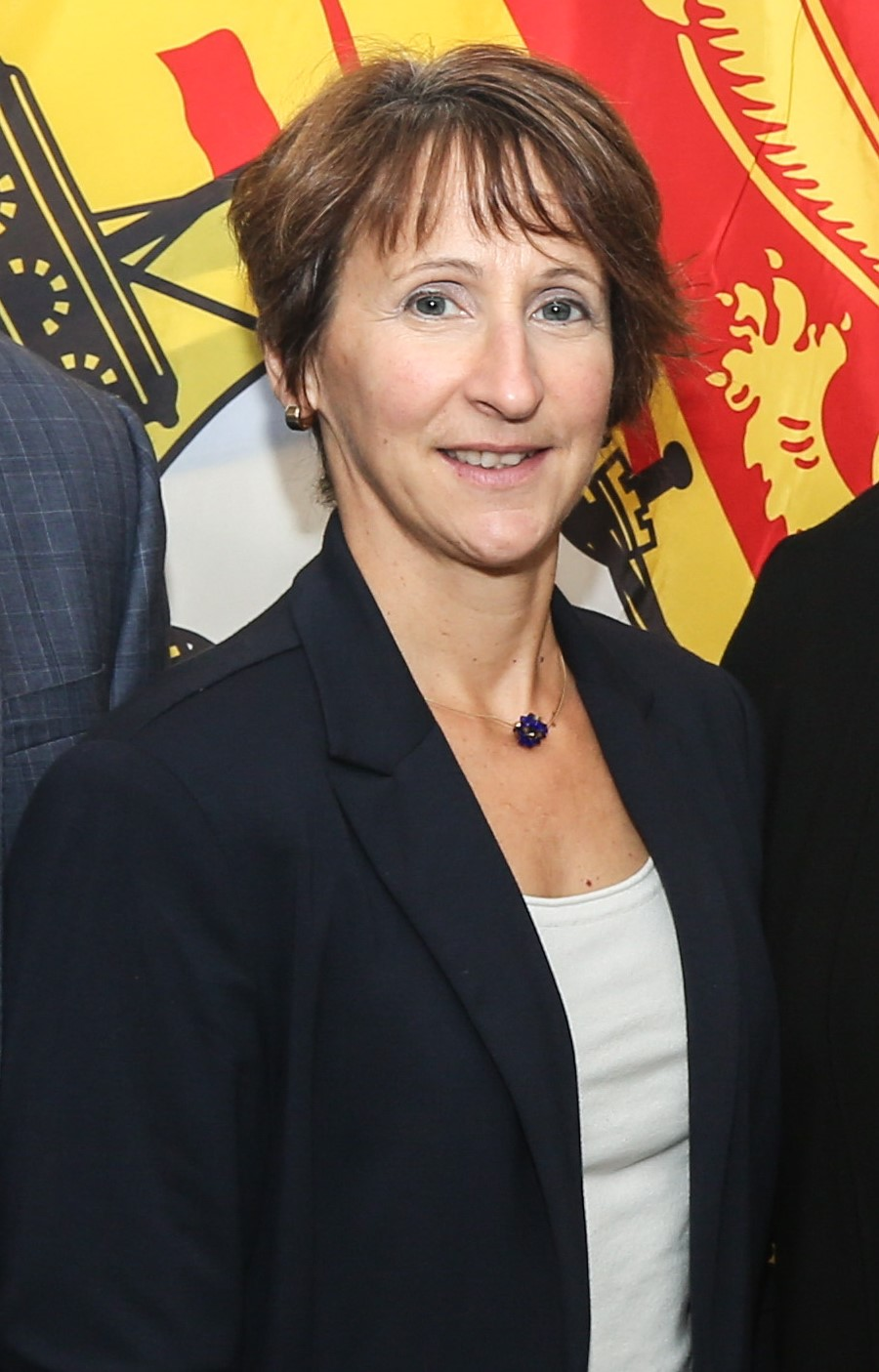
- LeBlanc in 2017

Member of the New Brunswick Legislative Assembly for Moncton East
- In office September 22, 2014 – September 14, 2020
- Preceded by: Chris Collins
- Succeeded by: Daniel Allain

Personal details
- Party: Liberal

Monique Anne LeBlanc is a Canadian politician, who was elected to the Legislative Assembly of New Brunswick in the 2014 provincial election. She represented the electoral district of Moncton East as a member of the Liberal Party.

LeBlanc was named to the Select Committee on Cannabis, pursuant to Motion 31 of the 3rd session of the 58th New Brunswick Legislature.

She was re-elected in the 2018 election. In the 2020 New Brunswick general election, LeBlanc lost her seat to Daniel Allain, Progressive Conservative candidate.

LeBlanc is now a councillor at-large on the Moncton City Council, after winning a seat in the 2021 municipal election.
