= Mike Dawson (politician) =

Canadian politician (born 1976)

Mike Dawson MP
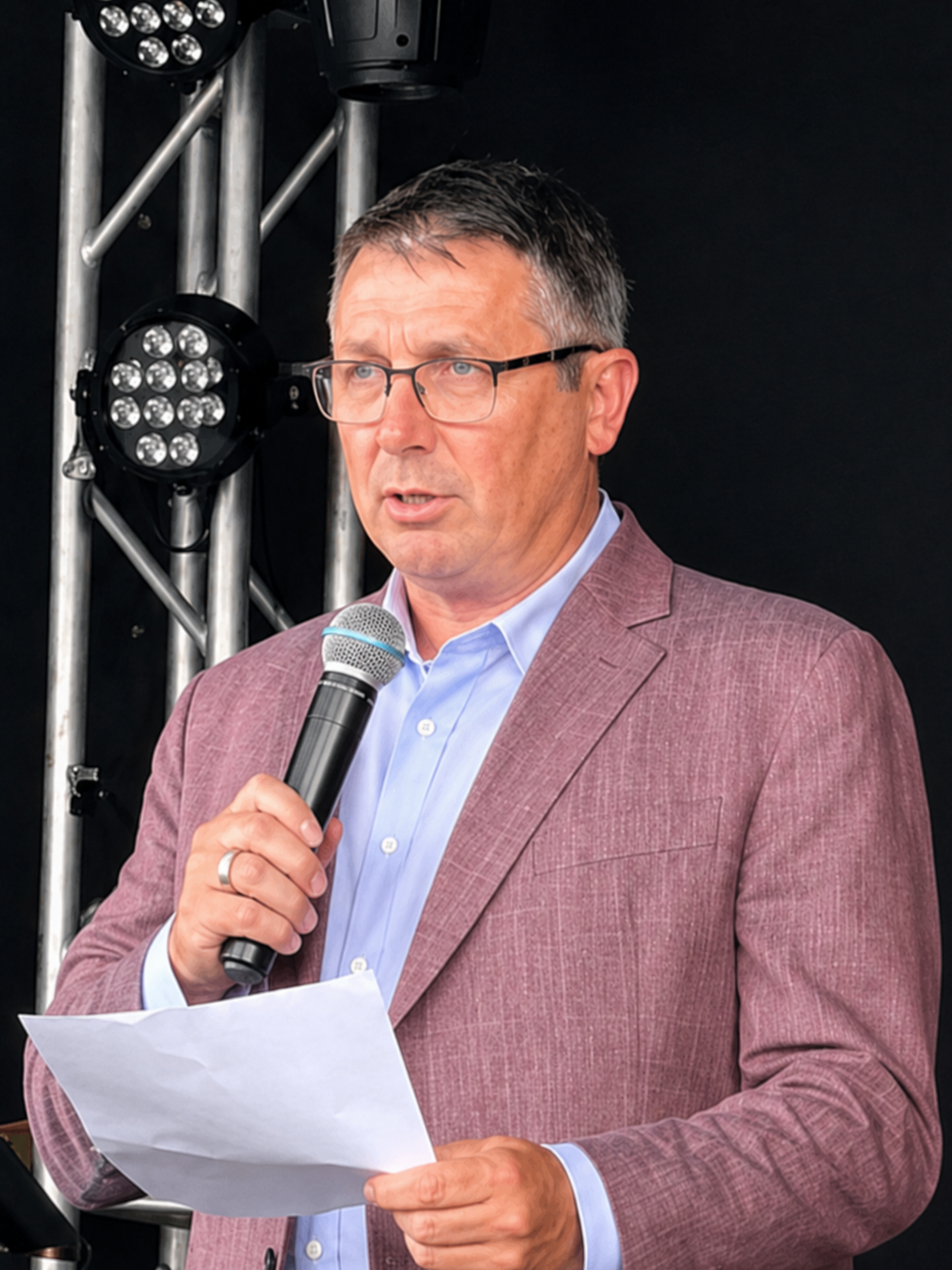
- Dawson in 2025

Member of Parliament for Miramichi—Grand Lake
- Incumbent
- Assumed office April 28, 2025
- Preceded by: Jake Stewart

New Brunswick Chief Government Whip
- In office June 27, 2023 – October 21, 2024
- Preceded by: Richard Ames
- Succeeded by: Jacques LeBlanc

Member of the New Brunswick Legislative Assembly for Miramichi West Southwest Miramichi-Bay du Vin (2022-2024)
- In office June 20, 2022 – March 25, 2025
- Preceded by: Jake Stewart
- Succeeded by: Kevin Russell

Personal details
- Born: Michael Dawson; October 20, 1976 (age 49) Newcastle, New Brunswick, Canada
- Party: Conservative (federal); Progressive Conservative (provincial)
- Spouse: Kathy Dawson
- Children: 2
- Relatives: Paul Dawson (cousin)
- Occupation: Drywaller, house painter

Mike Dawson MP (born October 20, 1976) is a Canadian politician, who was elected to the House of Commons of Canada in the 2025 Canadian federal election for Miramichi—Grand Lake. Prior to his election, he served as Progressive Conservative Party of New Brunswick MLA for Southwest Miramichi-Bay du Vin, and later Miramichi West, from 2022 to 2025.

== Personal life and career ==
Dawson was born in Newcastle, New Brunswick, to Mike and Darlene Dawson, both of whom are also drywallers and house painters. He is the eldest of four siblings and was raised in the rural community of Chelmsford. He is also related to Paul Dawson, who served as the MLA for Miramichi-Newcastle from 1982 to 1987, and as a city councillor and deputy mayor of Miramichi. He graduated from James M. Hill Memorial High School. He is married to Kathy, and they have two sons: Mikey and Dylan. Prior to entering politics, Dawson was a general contractor and operated Dawson’s Painting and Drywall.

At the time of the 2025 Canadian federal election, he lived in South Nelson, New Brunswick.

== Political career ==
=== Provincial politics ===
Dawson made the jump to provincial politics in 2022, when he was first elected in a by-election to the Legislative Assembly of New Brunswick for Southwest Miramichi-Bay du Vin as a member of the Progressive Conservative Party of New Brunswick, following the resignation of Jake Stewart. On June 27, 2023, he was named Chief Government Whip by Premier Blaine Higgs following a cabinet shuffle that saw his direct predecessor as whip, Richard Ames, named as Minister of Transportation and Infrastructure. In the 2024 New Brunswick general election, he was re-elected as an MLA, this time in the newly-created riding of Miramichi West.

Dawson resigned his seat on March 25, 2025; the by-election to replace him was held on October 6, 2025, which was won by Miramichi River Valley mayor Kevin Russell. He endorsed Daniel Allain in the 2026 Progressive Conservative Party of New Brunswick leadership election.

=== Federal politics ===
On March 24, 2025, it was announced that he had been nominated as the Conservative Party of Canada candidate for Miramichi—Grand Lake. Dawson would go on to win the 2025 Canadian federal election, narrowly defeating Liberal candidate and former Miramichi Bay-Neguac MLA Lisa Harris.

On February 10, 2026, Dawson sent a letter to Eric Janse, the Clerk of the House of Commons, stating that he intended to "refuse" the scheduled increase to his parliamentary salary on April 1, 2026. In August 2026, Janse filed an affidavit in Federal Court that all Canadian members of Parliament must be paid the salaries set by legislation, and that any deviations would be illegal.

== Electoral record ==
=== Federal ===
2025 Canadian federal election: Miramichi—Grand Lake
Party	Candidate	Votes	%	±%	Expenditures
Conservative	Mike Dawson	18,421	48.15	+2.69	$78,684.05
Liberal	Lisa Harris	18,037	47.15	+10.15	$93,802.05
New Democratic	Josh Floyd	968	2.53	–4.86	$0.00
Green	Matthew Ian Clark	831	2.17	–2.52	$0.00
Total valid votes/expense limit		38,257	99.22	+0.11	$124,379.63
Total rejected ballots		302	0.78	–0.11	
Turnout		38,559	74.30	+6.96	
Eligible voters		51,896			
Conservative notional hold		Swing		–3.73	
Source: Elections Canada
Note: number of eligible voters does not include voting day registrations.

=== Provincial ===
2024 New Brunswick general election: Miramichi West
Party	Candidate	Votes	%	±%
Progressive Conservative	Mike Dawson	3,814	57.08	+9.6
Liberal	Mark Hambrook	2,254	33.73	+11.2
Green	Genevieve MacRae	273	4.09	+2.3
People's Alliance	Rhonda L'Huillier	229	3.43	-23.0
Independent	Richard Sutherland	112	1.68	–
Total valid votes		6,682	99.82	
Total rejected ballots		12	0.18	
Turnout		6,694	66.71	
Eligible voters		10,035		
Progressive Conservative hold		Swing		-0.8
Source: Elections New Brunswick

New Brunswick provincial by-election, June 20, 2022: Southwest Miramichi-Bay du Vin Resignation of Jake Stewart
Party	Candidate	Votes	%	±%
Progressive Conservative	Mike Dawson	2,542	52.25	+4.28
Liberal	Hannah Fulton Johnston	1,737	35.70	+13.98
People's Alliance	Larry Lynch	363	7.46	-20.53
Green	Julie Guillemet-Ackerman	223	4.58	–
Total valid votes		4,865	99.75	
Total rejected ballots		12	0.25	-0.00
Turnout		4,877	43.78	-28.09
Eligible voters		11,140		
Progressive Conservative hold		Swing		-4.85
Source: Elections New Brunswick
