= Cindy Miles =

Canadian politician from New Brunswick

Minister of Social Development
- Incumbent
- Assumed office November 2, 2024
- Premier: Susan Holt
- Preceded by: Jill Green

Minister responsible for the Economic and Social Inclusion Corporation
- Incumbent
- Assumed office November 2, 2024
- Premier: Susan Holt

Member of the New Brunswick Legislative Assembly for Hanwell-New Maryland
- Incumbent
- Assumed office October 21, 2024
- Preceded by: Riding Established

Personal details
- Party: Liberal

Cindy Miles is a Canadian politician, who was elected to the Legislative Assembly of New Brunswick in the 2024 election. She was elected in the riding of Hanwell-New Maryland.

Miles is a graduate of St. Thomas University. On November 1, 2024, it was announced that she was placed in the cabinet as Minister of Social Development and Minister responsible for the Economic and Social Inclusion Corporation.

== Electoral record ==
2024 New Brunswick general election: Hanwell-New Maryland
Party	Candidate	Votes	%	±%
Liberal	Cindy Miles	4,006	42.76	+27.5
Progressive Conservative	Judy Wilson-Shee	3,948	42.14	-13.0
Green	Susan Jonah	1,051	11.22	-6.4
People's Alliance	Kris Hurtubise	177	1.89	-8.6
New Democratic	Joël Cyr LaPlante	119	1.27	-0.2
Libertarian	Meryl W. Sarty	67	0.72	
Total valid votes		9,368	99.84	
Total rejected ballots		15	0.16	
Turnout		9,383	72.47	
Eligible voters		12,948		
Liberal notional gain from Progressive Conservative		Swing		+20.2
Source: Elections New Brunswick
