= Don Monahan =

Canadian politician

- Monahan in 2025

Member of the New Brunswick Legislative Assembly for Arcadia-Butternut Valley-Maple Hills
- Incumbent
- Assumed office October 21, 2024
- Preceded by: new district

Personal details
- Born: Petitcodiac, New Brunswick
- Party: Progressive Conservative; Vision démocratique de Mascouche (municipal)
- Occupation: Owner of the KOA campground and Drive in, Sussex New Brunswick.

Don Monahan is a Canadian politician, who was elected to the Legislative Assembly of New Brunswick in the 2024 election for the Progressive Conservative Party of New Brunswick. He was elected in the riding of Arcadia-Butternut Valley-Maple Hills.

Monahan is originally from Petitcodiac, New Brunswick. He previously served on the city council of Mascouche, Quebec. He is fluent in both English and French.

Monahan was a candidate in the 2026 Progressive Conservative Party of New Brunswick leadership election, placing second behind Daniel Allain.

== Electoral record ==
2024 New Brunswick general election: Arcadia-Butternut Valley-Maple Hills
Party	Candidate	Votes	%	±%
Progressive Conservative	Don Monahan	4284	54.82	-3.58
Liberal	Connie Larson	2289	29.29	+14.79
Green	Brian Boucher	1093	13.99	+3.2
Libertarian	Anthony Matthews	149	1.91	+1.91
Total valid votes				
Total rejected ballots				
Turnout		7815		
Eligible voters				
