= Champdoré-Irishtown =

Provincial electoral district in New Brunswick, Canada

New Brunswick electoral district
- The riding of Champdore-Irishtown in relation to other New Brunswick electoral districts

Provincial electoral district
- Legislature: Legislative Assembly of New Brunswick
MLA
Lyne Chantal Boudreau
Liberal
- District created: 2023
- First contested: 2024

Demographics
- Census division(s): Westmorland, Kent
- Census subdivision(s): Champdoré, Irishtown, part of Moncton and Lakeville

Champdoré-Irishtown is a provincial electoral district for the Legislative Assembly of New Brunswick, Canada. It was created out of parts of Moncton East, Shediac Bay-Dieppe, Kent South, and a small part of Moncton Northwest. It was created in 2023 and was first contested during the 2024 New Brunswick general election. It was proposed in December 2022 and contains the newly-formed town of Champdoré as well as Irishtown, part of Moncton and Lakeville.

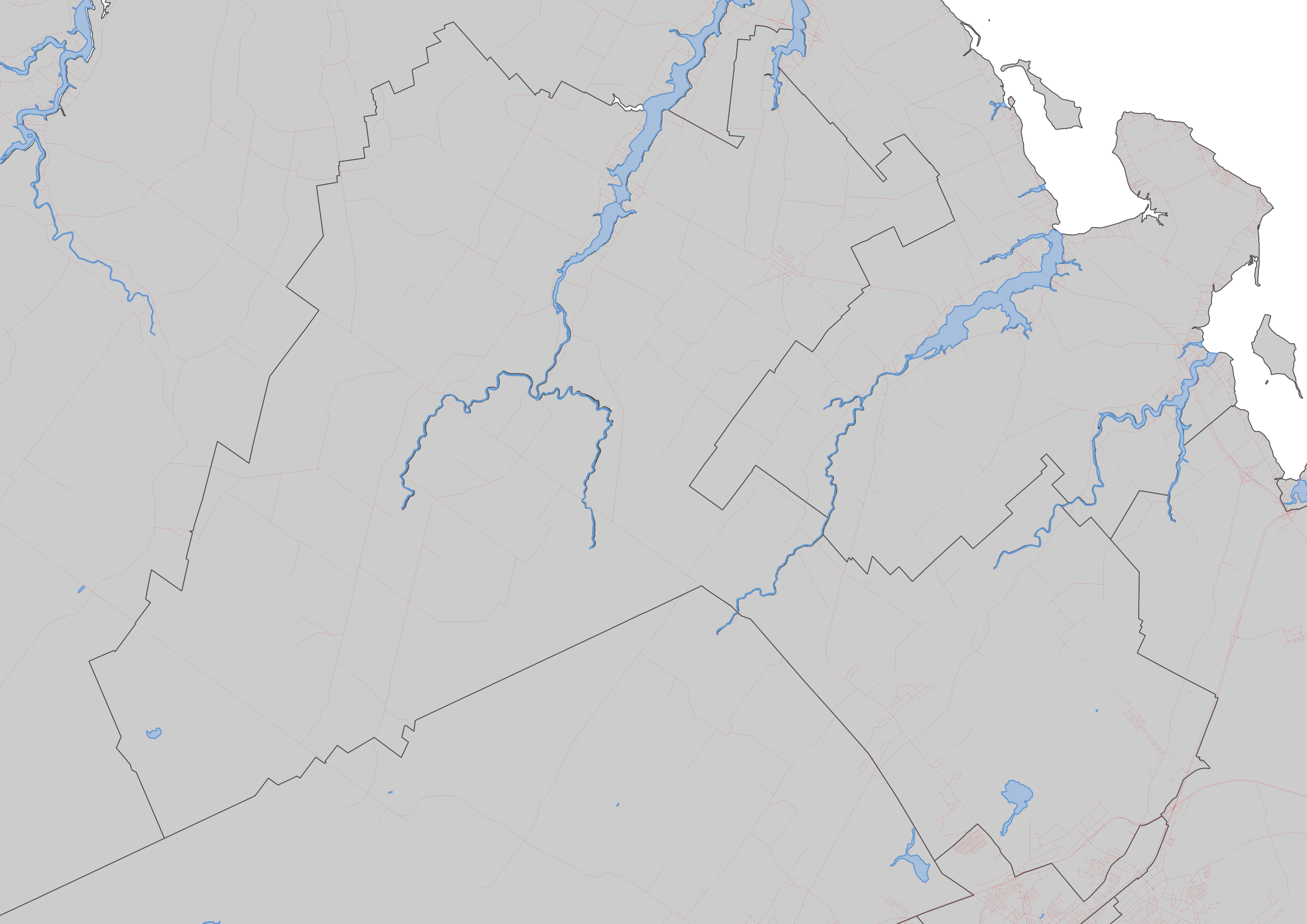
Champdore-Irishtown (as it exists from 2023) and the roads in the riding

== Members of the Legislative Assembly ==
Assembly	Years	Member	Party
Riding created from
61st	2024–Present	Lyne Chantal Boudreau	Liberal

== Election results ==
2024 New Brunswick general election
Party	Candidate	Votes	%	±%
Liberal	Lyne Chantal Boudreau	3,732	53.10	+11.7
Progressive Conservative	Ricky Gautreau	2,450	34.86	-6.2
Green	Matthew Ian Clark	743	10.57	-0.6
Libertarian	Adam Hennessey	103	1.47	
Total valid votes		7,028	99.49	
Total rejected ballots		36	0.51	
Turnout		7,064	66.74	
Eligible voters		10,584		
Liberal notional hold		Swing		+9.0
Source: Elections New Brunswick

2020 provincial election redistributed results
Party	%
Liberal	41.4
Progressive Conservative	41.1
Green	11.2
People's Alliance	4.6
New Democratic	1.7

== See also ==
- List of New Brunswick provincial electoral districts
- Canadian provincial electoral districts
