= Arcadia-Butternut Valley-Maple Hills =

Provincial electoral district in New Brunswick, Canada

New Brunswick electoral district
- The riding of Arcadia-Butternut Valley-Maple Hills (as it exists from 2023) in relation to other New Brunswick electoral districts

Provincial electoral district
- Legislature: Legislative Assembly of New Brunswick
MLA
Don Monahan
Progressive Conservative
- District created: 2023
- First contested: 2024

Arcadia-Butternut Valley-Maple Hills is a provincial electoral district for the Legislative Assembly of New Brunswick, Canada. It was almost completely created from Gagetown-Petitcodiac, with a few areas lost to Fredericton-Grand Lake and Sussex-Three Rivers, although the riding picked up many rural parts from the Moncton districts, and areas northwest of Sussex.

== District created ==
It was created in 2023 and was first contested in the 2024 New Brunswick general election. Like the predecessor riding of Gagetown-Petitcodiac, the riding runs along Highway 2 between Oromocto and Moncton. The riding covers the municipalities of Arcadia, the northern half of Valley Waters, the majority of Butternut Valley, Maple Hills, and some of the Kings Rural District, Southeast Rural District, Three Rivers, and Moncton.

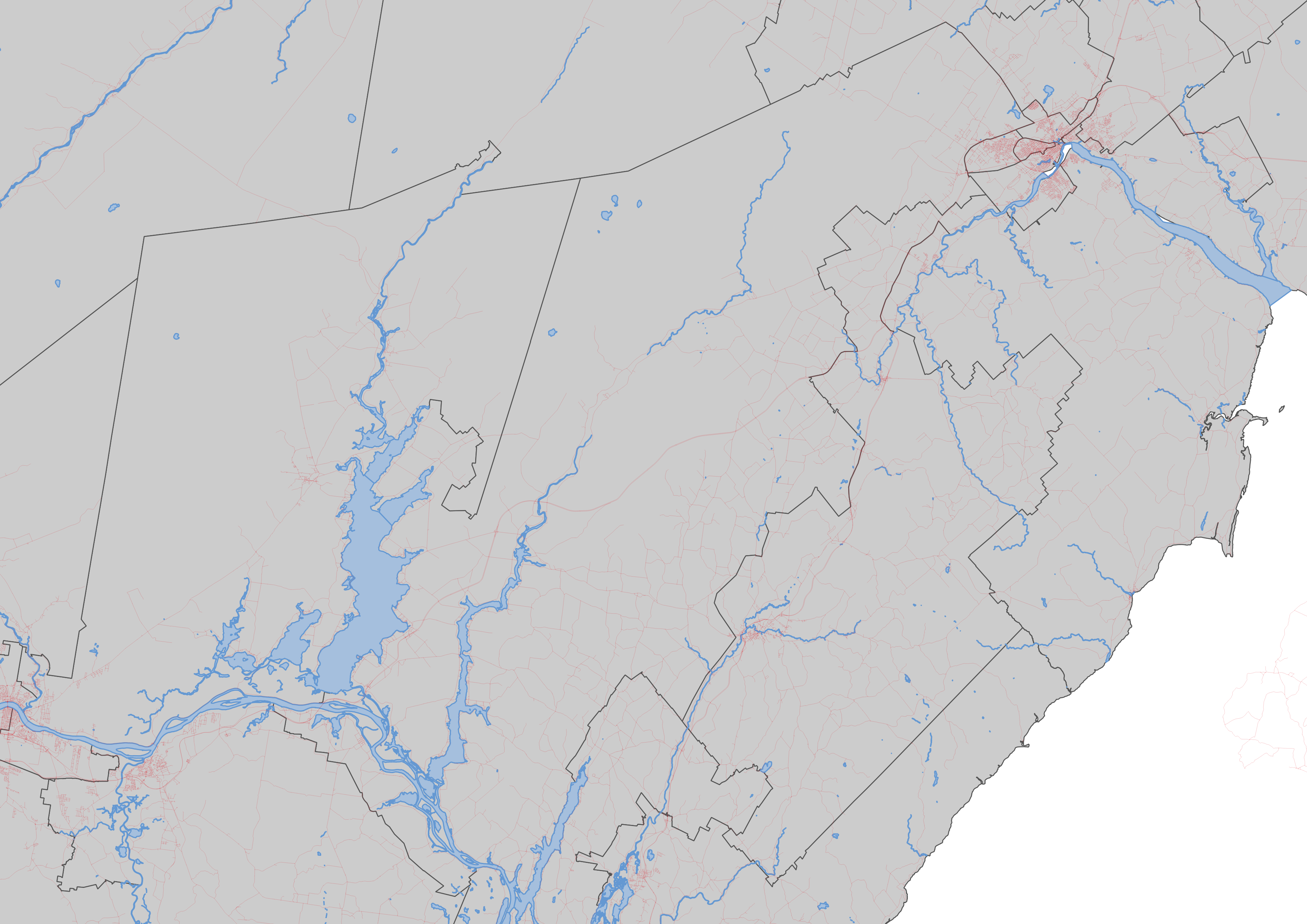
Arcadia-Butternut Valley-Maple Hills (as it exists from 2023) and the roads in the riding

== Members of the Legislative Assembly ==
| Assembly | Years | Member | Party |
|---|---|---|---|
Riding created from Gagetown-Petitcodiac
| 61st | 2024–Present | Don Monahan | Progressive Conservative |

== Election results ==
2024 New Brunswick general election
| Party | Candidate | Votes | % | ±% |
|---|---|---|---|---|
| Progressive Conservative | Don Monahan | 4284 | 54.82 | -3.58 |
| Liberal | Connie Larson | 2289 | 29.29 | +14.79 |
| Green | Brian Boucher | 1093 | 13.99 | +3.2 |
| Libertarian | Anthony Matthews | 149 | 1.91 | +1.91 |
| Total valid votes | | | | |
| Total rejected ballots | | | | |
| Turnout | | 7815 | | |
| Eligible voters | | | | |

2020 provincial election redistributed results
| Party | % |
|---|---|
| Progressive Conservative | 58.4 |
| Liberal | 14.5 |
| People's Alliance | 14.4 |
| Green | 10.8 |
| New Democratic | 1.8 |

== See also ==
- List of New Brunswick provincial electoral districts
- Canadian provincial electoral districts
