= Alexandre Cédric Doucet =

Member of the New Brunswick Legislative Assembly for Moncton East
- Incumbent
- Assumed office October 21, 2024
- Preceded by: Daniel Allain

Personal details
- Party: Liberal

Alexandre Cédric Doucet is a Canadian politician, who was elected to the Legislative Assembly of New Brunswick in the 2024 election. He was elected in the riding of Moncton East.

Doucet was president of the Acadian Society of New Brunswick. He is a lawyer by profession.

== Electoral record ==
2024 New Brunswick general election: Moncton East
Party	Candidate	Votes	%	±%
Liberal	Alexandre Cédric Doucet	4,449	60.0%	+20.4
Progressive Conservative	Paolo "PJ" Andreetti	1,903	25.7%	-9.0
Green	Diani Blanco	736	9.9%	-9.3
New Democratic	Alex Gagne	329	4.4%	+2.3
Total valid votes		7,417		
Total rejected ballots				
Turnout				
Eligible voters				
Liberal gain from Progressive Conservative		Swing		+
Source: Elections New Brunswick
