= 2025 Miramichi West provincial by-election =

- October 6, 2025

Riding of Miramichi West
	First party	Second party
Candidate	Kevin Russell	Hannah Fulton Johnston
Party	Progressive Conservative	Liberal
Popular vote	3,008	2,047
Percentage	57.40%	39.06%
Swing	▲0.33%	▲5.33%
MLA before election
Michael Dawson
Progressive Conservative
Elected MLA
Kevin Russell
Progressive Conservative

A by-election was held on October 6, 2025, in the provincial riding of Miramichi West in New Brunswick, Canada.

The by-election is to fill the vacant seat left by the resignation of PC MLA Michael Dawson who successfully ran in Miramichi—Grand Lake to represent the region federally during the 2025 federal election. It is the first time the Libertarian Party of New Brunswick has run in Miramichi. The first by-election since the 2024 provincial general election, it is considered an early test for Premier Susan Holt's government.

Advance polling occurred on Saturday, September 27 and Monday, September 29.

== Candidates ==
New Brunswick provincial by-election, October 6, 2025: Miramichi West Resignation of Mike Dawson
Party	Candidate	Votes	%	±%
Progressive Conservative	Kevin E. Russell	3,008	57.40	+0.33
Liberal	Hannah Fulton Johnston	2,047	39.06	+5.33
Green	Genevieve MacRae	98	1.87	-2.22
Independent	Richard (Hoss) Sutherland	62	1.18	-0.49
Libertarian	Christopher Rosser	25	0.48	
Total valid votes		5,240	99.85	
Total rejected ballots		8	0.15	-0.03
Turnout		5,248	52.61	-14.10
Eligible voters		9,976		
Progressive Conservative hold		Swing		–2.50

== Previous result ==
2024 New Brunswick general election: Miramichi West
Party	Candidate	Votes	%	±%
Progressive Conservative	Mike Dawson	3,814	57.08	+9.6
Liberal	Mark Hambrook	2,254	33.73	+11.2
Green	Genevieve MacRae	273	4.09	+2.3
People's Alliance	Rhonda L'Huillier	229	3.43	-23.0
Independent	Richard Sutherland	112	1.68	–
Total valid votes		6,682	99.82	
Total rejected ballots		12	0.18	
Turnout		6,694	66.71	
Eligible voters		10,035		
Progressive Conservative hold		Swing		-0.8
Source: Elections New Brunswick
