= Lyne Chantal Boudreau =

Canadian politician from New Brunswick

The Honourable Lyne Chantal Boudreau MLA

Minister responsible for Seniors
- Incumbent
- Assumed office November 2, 2024
- Premier: Susan Holt
- Preceded by: Kathy Bockus

Minister responsible for Women's Equality
- Incumbent
- Assumed office November 2, 2024
- Premier: Susan Holt
- Preceded by: Sherry Wilson

Member of the New Brunswick Legislative Assembly for Champdoré-Irishtown
- Incumbent
- Assumed office October 21, 2024
- Preceded by: New district

Personal details
- Party: Liberal

Lyne Chantal Boudreau MLA is a Canadian politician, who was elected to the Legislative Assembly of New Brunswick in the 2024 election. She was elected in the riding of Champdoré-Irishtown.

Boudreau is an educator by profession. Before entering politics, she was a professor of education at the Université de Moncton since January 2017. She was appointed Minister responsible for Seniors and Minister responsible for Women's Equality in the cabinet of Susan Holt effective November 2, 2024.

== Electoral record ==
2024 New Brunswick general election: Champdoré-Irishtown
Party	Candidate	Votes	%	±%
Liberal	Lyne Chantal Boudreau	3,732	53.10	+11.7
Progressive Conservative	Ricky Gautreau	2,450	34.86	-6.2
Green	Matthew Ian Clark	743	10.57	-0.6
Libertarian	Adam Hennessey	103	1.47	
Total valid votes		7,028	99.49	
Total rejected ballots		36	0.51	
Turnout		7,064	66.74	
Eligible voters		10,584		
Liberal notional hold		Swing		+9.0
Source: Elections New Brunswick
