= Tammy Scott-Wallace =

Canadian politician

Tammy Scott-Wallace MLA
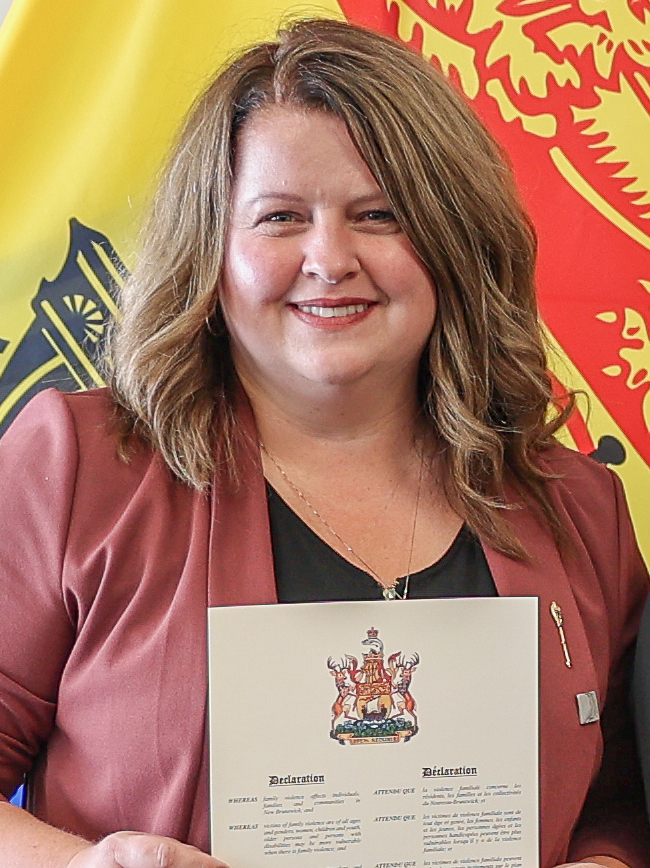
- Scott-Wallace in 2024

Minister of Tourism, Heritage and Culture
- In office September 29, 2020 – November 2, 2024
- Premier: Blaine Higgs
- Preceded by: Bruce Fitch
- Succeeded by: Isabelle Thériault

Minister responsible for Women's Equality
- In office September 29, 2020 – November 2, 2024
- Premier: Blaine Higgs
- Preceded by: Bruce Fitch
- Succeeded by: Lyne Chantal Boudreau

Member of the New Brunswick Legislative Assembly for Sussex-Fundy-St. Martins
- Incumbent
- Assumed office September 14, 2020
- Preceded by: Bruce Northrup

Personal details
- Born: Belleisle, New Brunswick, Canada
- Party: Progressive Conservatives

Tammy Scott-Wallace is a Canadian Progressive Conservative politician who has represented Sussex-Fundy-St. Martins in the Legislative Assembly of New Brunswick since 2020. Prior to running for politics, Scott-Wallace worked as a journalist, with the majority of those years spent writing for the Kings County Record and the Telegraph-Journal.

Scott-Wallace was a member of the Executive Council of New Brunswick, serving as Minister of Tourism, Heritage and Culture, as well as Minister responsible for Women's Equality in the cabinet of Blaine Higgs. She is the first woman to be elected to represent the riding of Sussex-Fundy-St. Martins.

== Early life ==
After growing up in Belleisle and graduating from Belleisle Regional High School, Scott-Wallace attended Mount Allison University's political science program before transferring to the journalism program at Holland College. From there, she launched a 25-year career as a journalist, writing for the Kings County Record and Telegraph-Journal for the bulk of her career.

== Political career ==
=== First election ===
Following the retirement of long-time Sussex-Fundy-St. Martins MLA Bruce Northrup, Scott-Wallace secured the Progressive Conservative nomination for the riding in the 2020 New Brunswick general election. Despite the riding being known as a conservative stronghold, the unpopularity of scrapped healthcare reform proposals left the party's standing in the region to be questioned. Assuring voters that the proposed changes would not be re-tabled by her party, Scott-Wallace was able to win Sussex-Fundy-St. Martins with a majority of the vote. In doing so, she became the first woman to represent the riding in the provincial legislature.

=== 2020–2024: Minister of Tourism, Heritage and Culture ===
As a freshman in the legislature, Premier Blaine Higgs appointed Scott-Wallace to his cabinet as Minister of Tourism, Heritage and Culture on September 29, 2020. She took over the mandate in the midst of the tourism sector's recovery from the COVID-19 pandemic. Scott-Wallace was also appointed Minister responsible for Women's Equality

In 2024, Scott-Wallace and her deputy minister came under scrutiny from Liberal opposition members as a result of a week-long trade mission they took to the United Kingdom and France. The trips, described as "Tourism Mission — Europe" on its financial statement, was critiqued as "a vacation with a few meetings here and there to justify it" by Liberal critic of tourism Isabelle Thériault.

== Electoral record ==
=== Sussex-Three Rivers ===
2024 New Brunswick general election: Sussex-Three Rivers
Party	Candidate	Votes	%	±%
Progressive Conservative	Tammy Scott-Wallace	3,789	44.8%	-13.8
Liberal	Bruce Northrup	3,282	38.8%	+26.9
Green	Teri McMackin	1,235	14.6%	+1.5
Libertarian	Wayne Wheeler	159	1.9%	
Total valid votes		8,465		
Total rejected ballots				
Turnout				
Eligible voters				
Progressive Conservative hold		Swing		
Source: Elections New Brunswick

=== Sussex-Fundy-St. Martins ===
2020 New Brunswick general election
Party	Candidate	Votes	%	±%
Progressive Conservative	Tammy Scott-Wallace	4,366	56.29	+6.83
People's Alliance	Jim Bedford	1,321	17.03	-7.26
Liberal	Cully Robinson	971	12.52	-3.19
Green	Tim Thompson	969	12.49	+5.95
New Democratic	Jonas Lanz	129	1.66	-1.63
Total valid votes		7,756		
Total rejected ballots		20	0.26	+0.14
Turnout		7,776	64.92	+0.87
Eligible voters		11,978		
Progressive Conservative hold		Swing		+7.04
Source: Elections New Brunswick
