= Miramichi West (electoral district) =

Provincial electoral district in New Brunswick, Canada

New Brunswick electoral district

Provincial electoral district
- Legislature: Legislative Assembly of New Brunswick
MLA
Kevin Russell
Progressive Conservative
- District created: 2023
- First contested: 2024

Demographics
- Census subdivision(s): Big Hole Tract 8, Doaktown, Greater Miramichi Rural District, Miramichi River Valley, Red Bank 4, Upper Miramichi

Miramichi West (French: Miramichi-Ouest) is a provincial electoral district for the Legislative Assembly of New Brunswick, Canada. It was created out of the western portions of Miramichi Bay-Neguac and Southwest Miramichi-Bay du Vin.

== District created ==
It was created in 2023 and will be first contested in the 2024 New Brunswick general election. It covers the western and more rural portions of Miramichi Bay-Neguac and Southwest Miramichi-Bay du Vin. The riding covers the northwestern and southern areas in the Greater Miramichi Rural District, the Miramichi River Valley, Doaktown, and Upper Miramichi. The riding also includes Eel Ground First Nation and Metepenagiag Miꞌkmaq Nation.

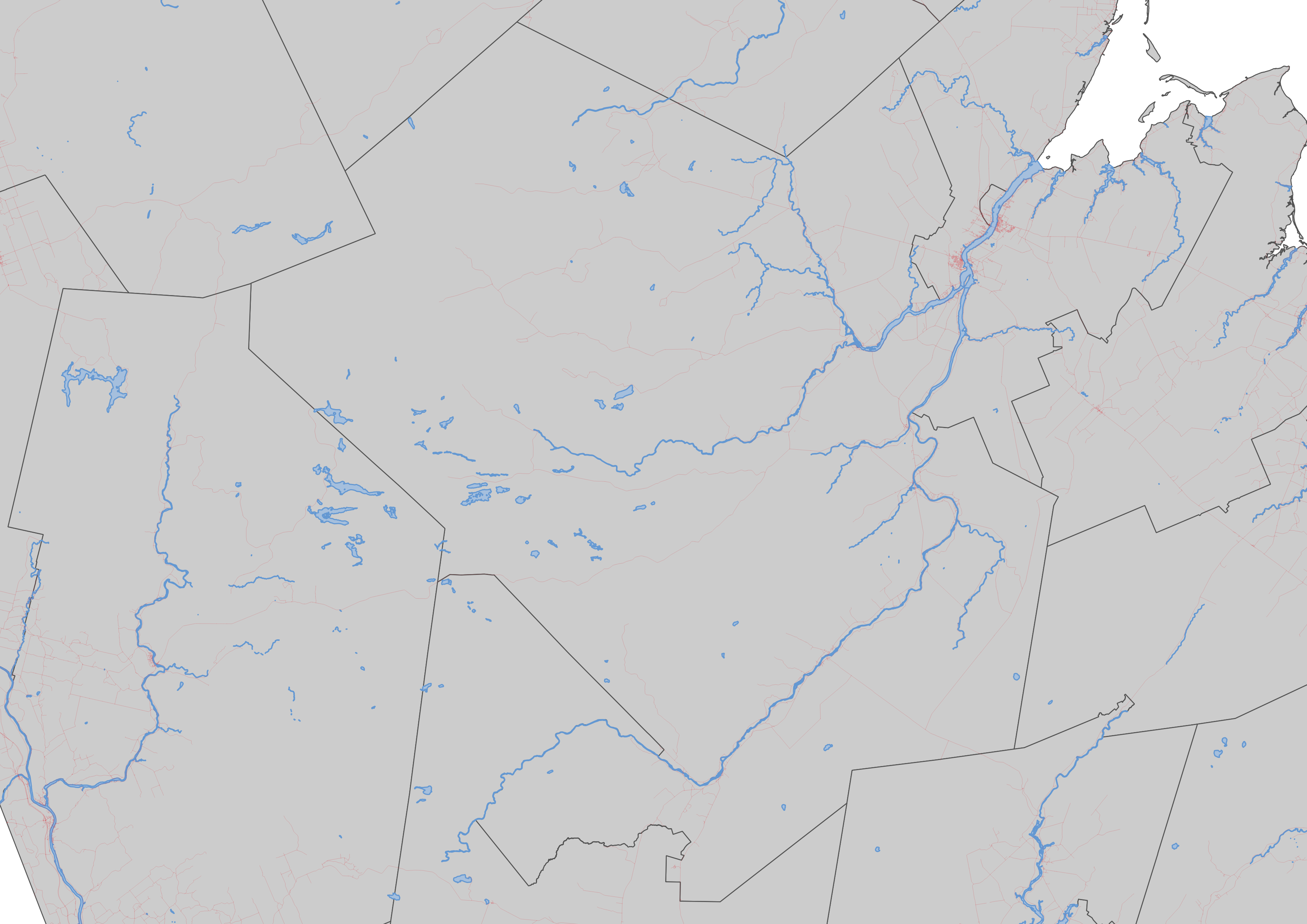
Miramichi West (as it exists from 2023) and the roads in the riding

== Members of the Legislative Assembly ==
Miramichi West
Assembly	Years	Member	Party
Riding created from Miramichi Bay-Neguac and Southwest Miramichi-Bay du Vin
61st	2024–2025	Michael Dawson	Progressive Conservative
61st	2025–present	Kevin Russell	Progressive Conservative

== Election results ==
New Brunswick provincial by-election, October 6, 2025 Resignation of Michael Dawson
Party	Candidate	Votes	%	±%
Progressive Conservative	Kevin E. Russell	3,008	57.40	+0.33
Liberal	Hannah Fulton Johnston	2,047	39.06	+5.33
Green	Genevieve MacRae	98	1.87	-2.22
Independent	Richard (Hoss) Sutherland	62	1.18	-0.49
Libertarian	Christopher Rosser	25	0.48	
Total valid votes		5,240	99.85	
Total rejected ballots		8	0.15	-0.03
Turnout		5,248	52.61	-14.10
Eligible voters		9,976		
Progressive Conservative hold		Swing		–2.50

2024 New Brunswick general election
Party	Candidate	Votes	%	±%
Progressive Conservative	Michael Dawson	3,814	57.08	+9.6
Liberal	Mark Hambrook	2,254	33.73	+11.2
Green	Genevieve MacRae	273	4.09	+2.3
People's Alliance	Rhonda L'Huillier	229	3.43	-23.0
Independent	Richard Sutherland	112	1.68	–
Total valid votes		6,682	99.82	
Total rejected ballots		12	0.18	
Turnout		6,694	66.71	
Eligible voters		10,035		
Progressive Conservative hold		Swing		-0.8
Source: Elections New Brunswick

2020 provincial election redistributed results
Party	%
Progressive Conservative	47.5
People's Alliance	26.4
Liberal	22.5
New Democratic Party	1.8
Green	1.8

== See also ==
- List of New Brunswick provincial electoral districts
- Canadian provincial electoral districts
