= Glen Savoie =

Canadian politician

Glen Savoie MLA
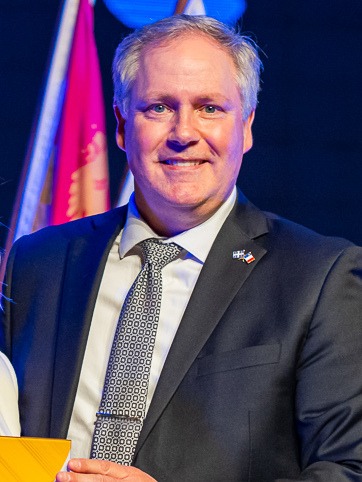
- Savoie in 2024

Leader of the Opposition in New Brunswick
- In office November 19, 2024 – October 20, 2026
- Preceded by: Susan Holt
- Succeeded by: Margaret Johnson

Interim Leader of the Progressive Conservative Party of New Brunswick
- In office October 28, 2024 – October 17, 2026
- Preceded by: Blaine Higgs
- Succeeded by: Daniel Allain

Minister of Local Government
- In office June 27, 2023 – November 2, 2024
- Preceded by: Daniel Allain
- Succeeded by: Aaron Kennedy

Minister responsible for La Francophonie
- In office February 21, 2020 – November 2, 2024
- Preceded by: Robert Gauvin
- Succeeded by: Robert Gauvin

Assembly Member for Saint John East Saint John-Fundy (2010-2014)
- Incumbent
- Assumed office November 17, 2014
- Preceded by: Gary Keating
- In office September 27, 2010 – September 22, 2014
- Preceded by: Stuart Jamieson
- Succeeded by: Gary Keating

Personal details
- Party: Progressive Conservative

Glen Louis Savoie is a Canadian politician, who was elected to the Legislative Assembly of New Brunswick in the 2010 provincial election. He represented the electoral district of Saint John-Fundy as a member of the Progressive Conservatives until the 2014 provincial election on September 22, 2014, when he was defeated by Gary Keating in the redistributed riding of Saint John East.

Following Keating's resignation, just 22 days after the election, Savoie ran as the Progressive Conservative candidate in the resulting by-election, and won reelection to the legislature on November 17. Savoie was re-elected in the 2018, 2020 and 2024 provincial elections.

Following the Progressive Conservative's defeat in the 2024 New Brunswick general election, Savoie was named interim party leader, succeeding outgoing premier Blaine Higgs who had lost his seat.

== Electoral record ==
2024 New Brunswick general election: Saint John East
Party	Candidate	Votes	%	±%
Progressive Conservative	Glen Savoie	3,181	43.6	-11.9
Liberal	David Alston	3,147	43.1	+17.9
Green	Gerald Irish	514	7.0	-0.7
New Democratic	Josh Floyd	252	3.5	-0.1
People's Alliance	Tanya Graham	118	1.6	-6.1
Libertarian	Denise Campbell	92	1.3	New
Total valid votes		7,304		
Total rejected ballots				
Turnout				
Eligible voters				
Source: Elections New Brunswick

2020 New Brunswick general election: Saint John East
Party	Candidate	Votes	%	±%
Progressive Conservative	Glen Savoie	3,507	56.36	+10.75
Liberal	Phil Comeau	1,639	26.34	-0.50
People's Alliance	Patrick Kemp	434	6.98	-8.85
Green	Gerald Irish	394	6.33	+0.69
New Democratic	Josh Floyd	248	3.99	-2.09
Total valid votes		6,222		
Total rejected ballots		8	0.13	-0.07
Turnout		6,230	55.55	-2.82
Eligible voters		11,216		
Progressive Conservative hold		Swing		+10.75
Source: Elections New Brunswick

New Brunswick provincial by-election, November 17, 2014: Saint John East
Party	Candidate	Votes	%	±%
Progressive Conservative	Glen Savoie	2,225	44.31	+7.43
Liberal	Shelley Rinehart	1,398	27.84	-9.18
New Democratic	Dominic Cardy	1,099	21.88	+3.36
Green	Sharon Murphy	262	5.22	-0.39
People's Alliance	Arthur Watson	38	0.76	-1.21
Total valid votes		5,022	100.00	
Progressive Conservative gain from Liberal		Swing		+8.31
Source: Elections New Brunswick

2014 New Brunswick general election: Saint John East
Party	Candidate	Votes	%	±%
Liberal	Gary Keating	2,332	37.02	+3.96
Progressive Conservative	Glen Savoie	2,323	36.88	-0.96
New Democratic	Phil Comeau	1,167	18.53	-5.16
Green	Sharon Murphy	353	5.60	+0.20
People's Alliance	Jason Inness	124	1.97	
Total valid votes		6,299	100.0	
Total rejected ballots		26	0.41	
Turnout		6,325	54.88	
Eligible voters		11,526		
Liberal notional gain from Progressive Conservative		Swing		+2.46
Voting results declared after judicial recount.
Source: Elections New Brunswick

2010 New Brunswick general election: Saint John-Fundy
Party	Candidate	Votes	%	±%
Progressive Conservative	Glen Savoie	2,908	52.02	+14.17
Liberal	Gary Keating	1,734	31.02	-24.44
New Democratic	Lise Lennon	592	10.59	+3.90
Green	Mathew Ian Clark	185	3.31	–
People's Alliance	Glenn McAllister	171	3.06	–
Total valid votes		5,590	100.0	
Progressive Conservative gain from Liberal		Swing		+19.30
Source: Elections New Brunswick
