= Moncton East (electoral district) =

Provincial electoral district in New Brunswick, Canada

New Brunswick electoral district
- The riding of Moncton East (as it exists from 2023) in relation to other New Brunswick electoral districts
- Coordinates: 46.154°N 64.765°W

Provincial electoral district
- Legislature: Legislative Assembly of New Brunswick
MLA
Alexandre Cédric Doucet
Liberal
- District created: 2013
- First contested: 2014
- Last contested: 2024

Demographics
- Population (2011): 15,387
- Electors (2013): 11,558
- Census division(s): Westmorland, Kent
- Census subdivision: Moncton

Moncton East (French: Moncton-Est) is a provincial electoral district for the Legislative Assembly of New Brunswick, Canada. It was first contested in the 2014 general election, having been created in the 2013 redistribution of electoral boundaries.

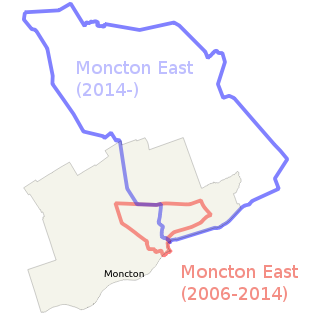
The electoral districts of Moncton East (2006–2014) and Moncton East (2014–) as they relate to the city of Moncton.

The district includes the northeasternmost parts of the city of Moncton, as well as neighbouring suburban communities northeast of Moncton, stretching into the edge of Kent County.

Though the district shares a name with an immediate predecessor, this district took in only 32% of the old district of Moncton East, the majority of which went to Moncton Centre where incumbent Chris Collins was elected.

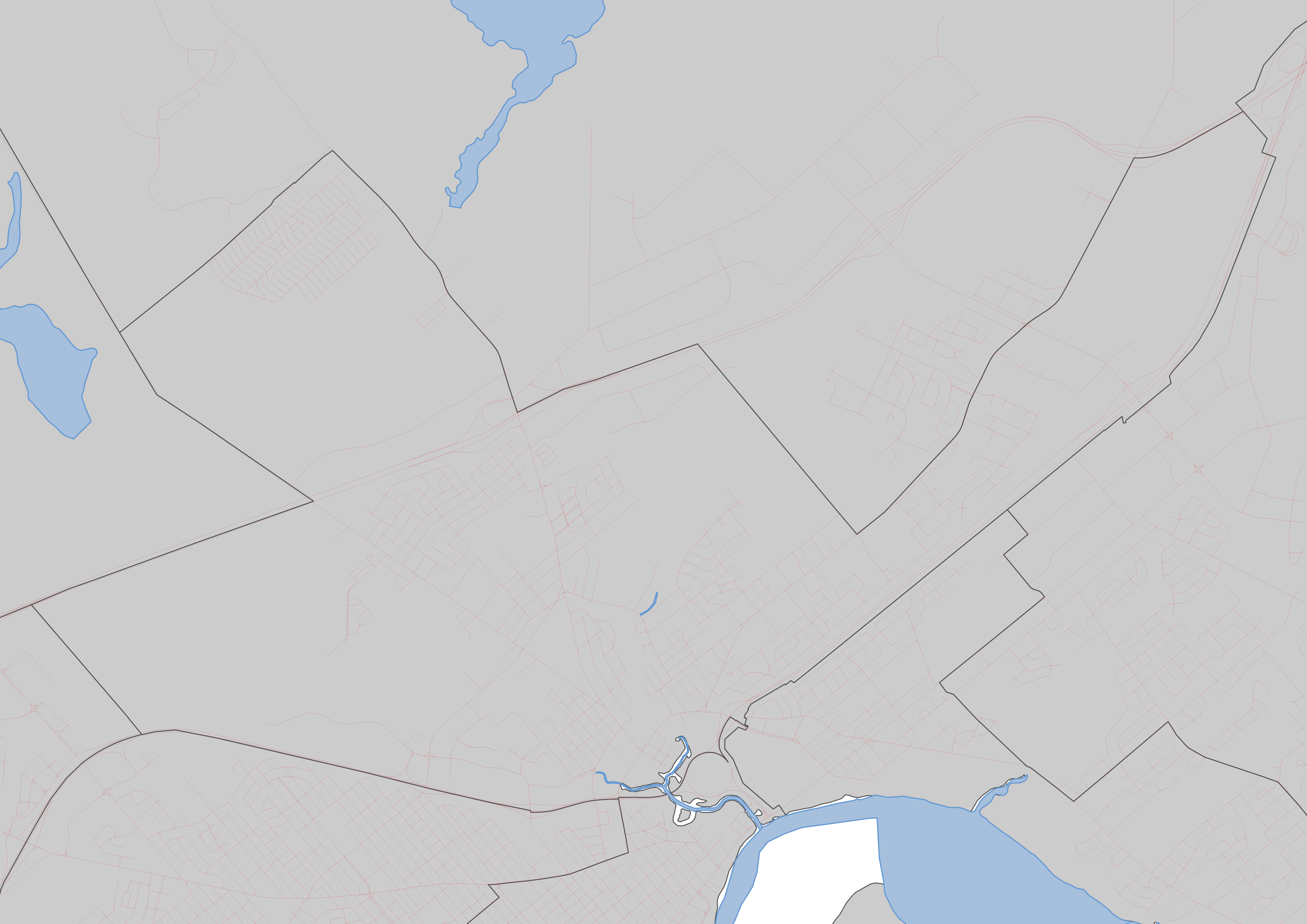
Moncton East (as it exists from 2023) and the roads in the riding

== Members of the Legislative Assembly ==
Assembly	Years	Member	Party
Riding created from Moncton East (1974–2014), Moncton Crescent, Memramcook-Lakeville-Dieppe, Kent South, Dieppe Centre-Lewisville and Petitcodiac
58th	2014–2018	Monique LeBlanc	Liberal
59th	2018–2020	Monique LeBlanc	Liberal
60th	2020–2024	Daniel Allain	Progressive Conservative
61st	2024–Present	Alexandre Cédric Doucet	Liberal

== Election results ==
2024 New Brunswick general election
Party	Candidate	Votes	%	±%
Liberal	Alexandre Cédric Doucet	4,449	60.0%	+20.4
Progressive Conservative	Paolo "PJ" Andreetti	1,903	25.7%	-9.0
Green	Diani Blanco	736	9.9%	-9.3
New Democratic	Alex Gagne	329	4.4%	+2.3
Total valid votes		7,417		
Total rejected ballots				
Turnout				
Eligible voters				
Liberal gain from Progressive Conservative		Swing		+
Source: Elections New Brunswick

2020 provincial election redistributed results
Party	%
Liberal	39.6
Progressive Conservative	34.7
Green	19.2
People's Alliance	4.4
New Democratic	2.1

2020 New Brunswick general election
Party	Candidate	Votes	%	±%
Progressive Conservative	Daniel Allain	3,525	45.17	+9.40
Liberal	Monique LeBlanc	2,759	35.35	-11.46
Green	Phylomène Zangio	989	12.67	+0.73
People's Alliance	Michel Norman Guitare	378	4.84	
New Democratic	Christopher Wanamaker	153	1.96	-3.51
Total valid votes		7,804		
Total rejected ballots		29	0.37	-0.13
Turnout		7,833	63.33	+0.38
Eligible voters		12,368		
Progressive Conservative gain from Liberal		Swing		+10.43

2018 New Brunswick general election
Party	Candidate	Votes	%	±%
Liberal	Monique LeBlanc	3,626	46.81	+1.72
Progressive Conservative	Marty Kingston	2,771	35.77	+2.76
Green	Matthew Ian Clark	925	11.94	+4.52
New Democratic	Anthony Crandall	424	5.47	-9.00
Total valid votes		7,746	99.50	
Total rejected ballots		39	0.50	+0.07
Turnout		7,785	62.95	+0.72
Eligible voters		12,367		
Liberal hold		Swing		-0.52

2014 New Brunswick general election
Party	Candidate	Votes	%
Liberal	Monique LeBlanc	3,443	45.09
Progressive Conservative	Jane Mitton-MacLean	2,521	33.01
New Democratic	Roy MacMullin	1,105	14.47
Green	Matthew Ian Clark	567	7.43
Total valid votes		7,636	99.57
Total rejected ballots		33	0.43
Turnout		7,669	62.23
Eligible voters		12,323	
This riding was created from parts of the previous riding of Moncton East, Moncton Crescent, Memramcook-Lakeville-Dieppe, Kent South, Dieppe Centre-Lewisville and Petitcodiac, which elected three Liberals and three Progressive Conservatives (Moncton Crescent, Kent South and Petitcodiac) in the previous election. Neither of the six incumbents ran in this election.
Source: Elections New Brunswick

== See also ==
- List of New Brunswick provincial electoral districts
- Canadian provincial electoral districts
