= Daniel Allain =

Canadian politician

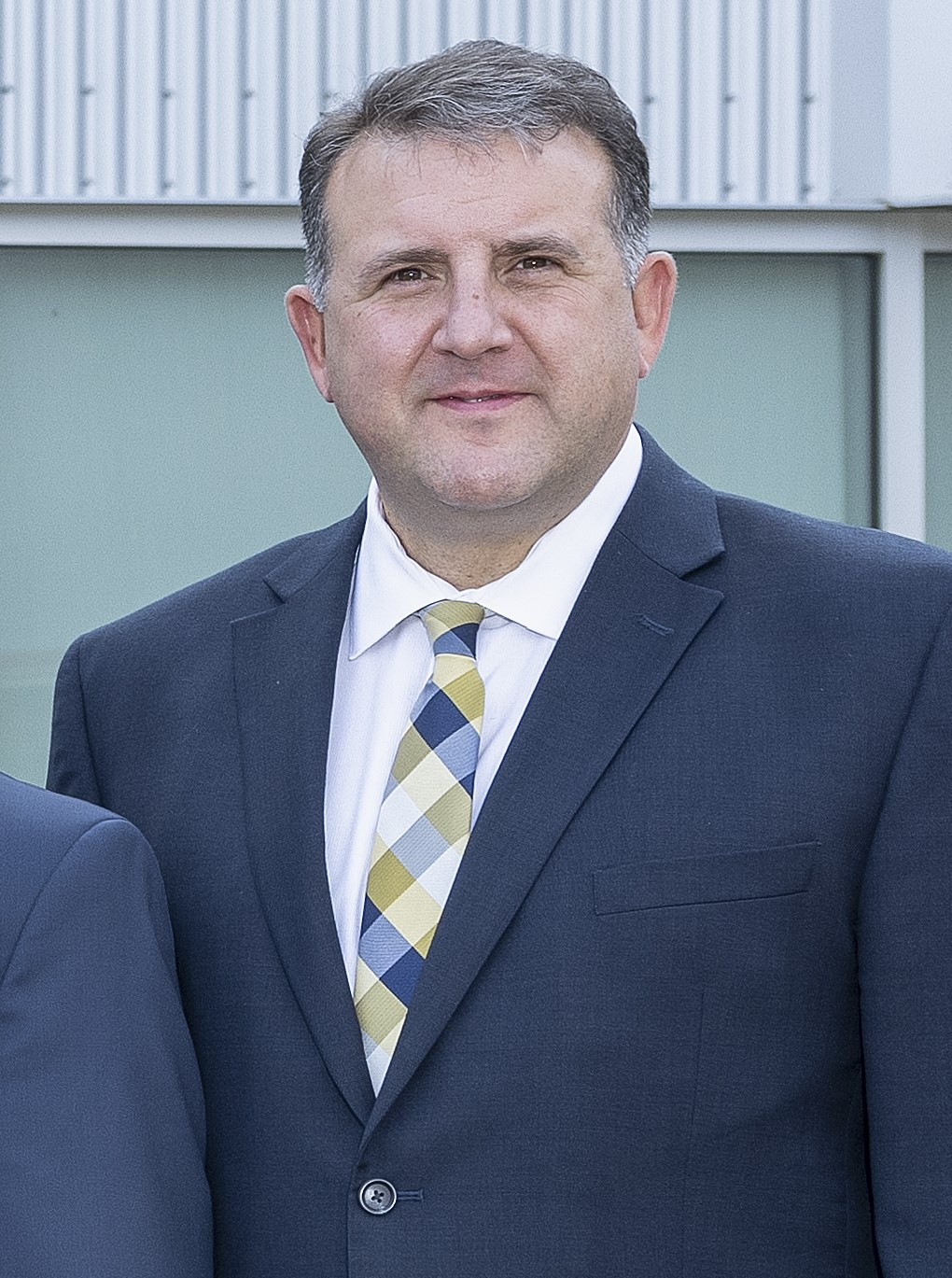
- Allain in 2022

Leader of the Progressive Conservative Party of New Brunswick
- Incumbent
- Assumed office October 17, 2026
- Preceded by: Glen Savoie (interim)

Minister of Local Government and Local Governance Reform
- In office September 29, 2020 – June 27, 2023
- Premier: Blaine Higgs
- Preceded by: Jeff Carr (Environment and Local Government)
- Succeeded by: Glen Savoie

Member of the New Brunswick Legislative Assembly for Moncton East
- In office September 14, 2020 – September 19, 2024
- Preceded by: Monique LeBlanc
- Succeeded by: Alexandre Cédric Doucet

Personal details
- Party: Progressive Conservative (provincial)
- Other political affiliations: Conservative (federal)

Daniel Allain is a Canadian politician who has served as the leader of the Progressive Conservative Party of New Brunswick since 2026. He was previously elected to the Legislative Assembly of New Brunswick at the 2020 general election in the riding of Moncton East and sat in the legislature until 2024. Allain also served as Minister of Local Government and Local Governance Reform in the Blaine Higgs government until being dropped from the cabinet on June 27, 2023.

== Political career ==
In his early political career, Allain served as Premier Bernard Lord's constituency assistant in Moncton East from 2000 to 2003. Allain stood in the 2008 Canadian federal election in Moncton—Riverview—Dieppe. In 2013, during the mandate of Premier David Alward, he was appointed Deputy Minister of Management and Administration in the Office of the Premier of New Brunswick, and, in 2010, he was appointed president and chief executive officer of NB Liquor.

From 2016 to 2020, Allain served as an at-large city councillor in Dieppe. As part of this municipal role, he also sat on the board of the Codiac Regional Policing Authority.

In the 2020 New Brunswick general election, Allain defeated Liberal MLA Monique LeBlanc and became the MLA for the Moncton East. As the only francophone in caucus and a former municipal councillor, Allain was made a member of the Executive Council of New Brunswick and given the position of Minister of Local Government and Local Governance Reform.

As Minister, Allain oversaw the implementation of significant reforms. Promoted as being the most substantial since Premier Robichaud's Equal Opportunity Program, the Higgs-Allain local governance reforms consolidated the province's many local governance entities from 340 to fewer than 100.

Following premier Blaine Higgs's revision of Policy 713, Allain, then serving as the Minister of Local Government and Local Governance Reform, expressed his "extreme disappointment in a lack of process and transparency" in a jointly signed letter with fellow cabinet minister Jeff Carr. On June 27, 2023, Higgs dismissed both Allain and Carr from their cabinet positions, citing a breach of cabinet solidarity due to their support for the opposition motion on the policy. Allain and Carr, along with resigned ministers Dorothy Shephard and Trevor Holder, all voted with the opposition parties on June 15 which favoured a Liberal motion which opposed the policy revision and called for increased consultation on the policy. Allain and Carr were both relegated to backbencher positions, and new ministers were appointed to fill their cabinet roles. Allain had planned to be a candidate for the newly created riding of Champdoré-Irishtown, but instead made an announcement on March 1, 2024, that he would not be a candidate in the next election but would remain in the legislature until the election was called.

On October 18, 2025, Allain announced his candidacy for the 2026 Progressive Conservative Party of New Brunswick leadership election. He won the race, and became leader on October 17, 2026.

== Electoral history ==
=== 2020 New Brunswick general election ===
2020 New Brunswick general election
Party	Candidate	Votes	%	±%
Progressive Conservative	Daniel Allain	3,525	45.17	+9.40
Liberal	Monique LeBlanc	2,759	35.35	-11.46
Green	Phylomène Zangio	989	12.67	+0.73
People's Alliance	Michel Norman Guitare	378	4.84	
New Democratic	Christopher Wanamaker	153	1.96	-3.51
Total valid votes		7,804		
Total rejected ballots		29	0.37	-0.13
Turnout		7,833	63.33	+0.38
Eligible voters		12,368		
Progressive Conservative gain from Liberal		Swing		+10.43

=== 2008 Canadian federal election ===
2008 Canadian federal election
Party	Candidate	Votes	%	±%	Expenditures
Liberal	Brian Murphy	17,797	39.13	-8.58	$73,263.48
Conservative	Daniel Allain	16,297	35.83	+5.72	$76,634.27
New Democratic	Carl Bainbridge	7,394	16.26	-2.67	$2,294.96
Green	Alison Ménard	3,998	8.79	+5.86	$4,619.17
Total valid votes/Expense limit		45,486	100.0		$82,313
Total rejected, unmarked and declined ballots		286	0.51	-0.25	
Turnout		45,772	61.31	-5.56	
Eligible voters		74,660			
Liberal hold		Swing		-7.15	
