= Sussex-Three Rivers =

Provincial electoral district in New Brunswick, Canada

New Brunswick electoral district
- The riding of Sussex-Three Rivers (as it exists from 2023) in relation to other New Brunswick electoral districts

Provincial electoral district
- Legislature: Legislative Assembly of New Brunswick
MLA
Tammy Scott-Wallace
Progressive Conservative
- District created: 2023
- First contested: 2024

Sussex-Three Rivers is a provincial electoral district for the Legislative Assembly of New Brunswick, Canada. The riding was formed from parts of Moncton Southwest, Gagetown-Petitcodiac, Albert, and Sussex-Fundy-St. Martins.

== History ==
It was created in 2023 and was first contested in the 2024 New Brunswick general election. The riding contains the municipality of Sussex, with parts of the Kings Rural District, Butternut Valley, Three Rivers, and Salisbury.

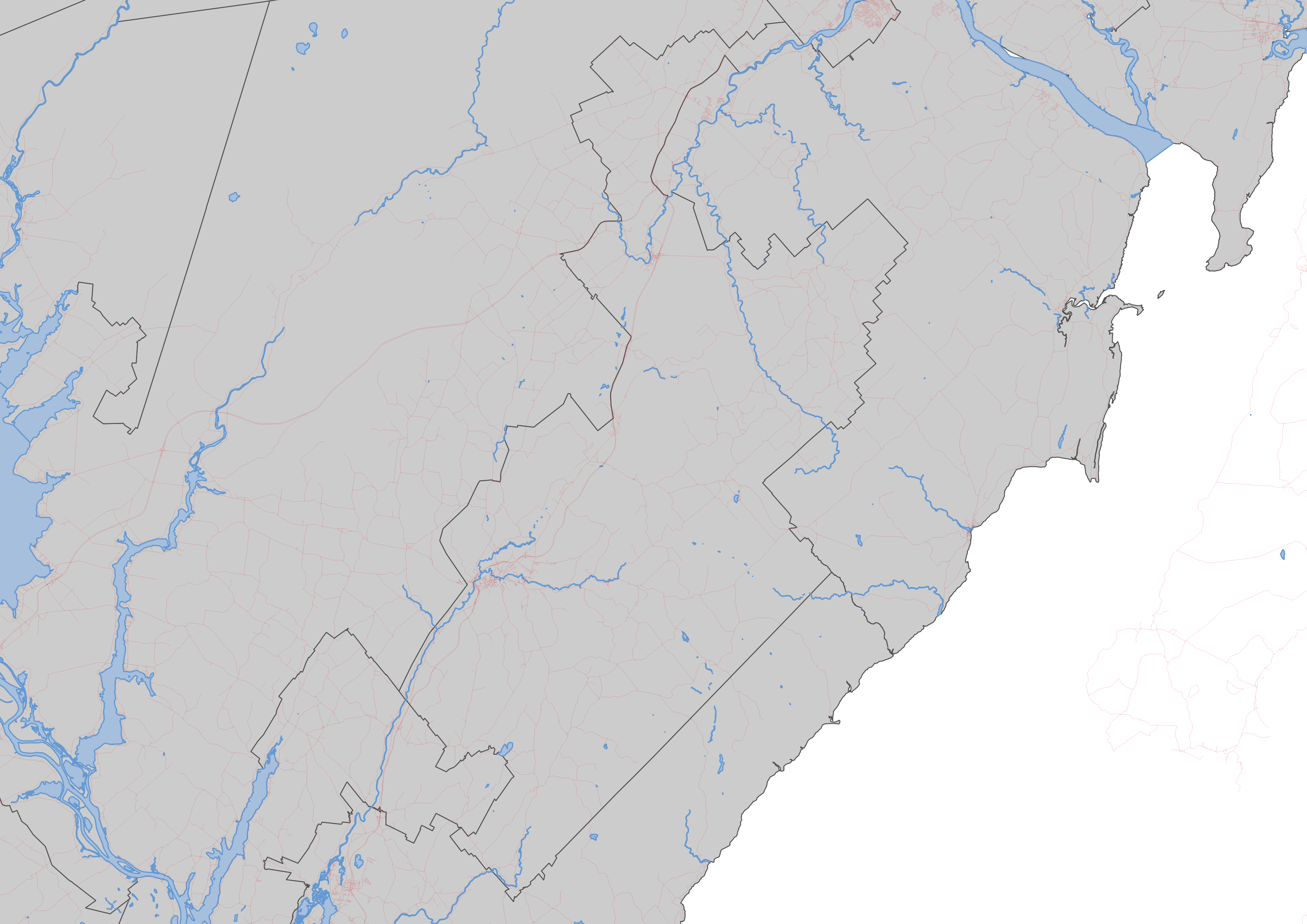
Sussex-Three Rivers (as it exists from 2023) and the roads in the riding

== Members of the Legislative Assembly ==
| Assembly | Years | Member | Party |
|---|---|---|---|
Sussex-Three Rivers; Riding created from Sussex-Fundy-St. Martins
| 61st | 2024–Present | Tammy Scott-Wallace | Progressive Conservative |

== Election results ==
2024 New Brunswick general election
| Party | Candidate | Votes | % | ±% |
|---|---|---|---|---|
| Progressive Conservative | Tammy Scott-Wallace | 3,789 | 44.8% | -13.8 |
| Liberal | Bruce Northrup | 3,282 | 38.8% | +26.9 |
| Green | Teri McMackin | 1,235 | 14.6% | +1.5 |
| Libertarian | Wayne Wheeler | 159 | 1.9% | |
| Total valid votes | | 8,465 | | |
| Total rejected ballots | | | | |
| Turnout | | | | |
| Eligible voters | | | | |
| Progressive Conservative hold | | Swing | | |
Source: Elections New Brunswick

2020 provincial election redistributed results
| Party | % |
|---|---|
| Progressive Conservative | 58.6 |
| People's Alliance | 15.0 |
| Green | 13.1 |
| Liberal | 11.9 |
| New Democratic | 1.4 |

== See also ==
- List of New Brunswick provincial electoral districts
- Canadian provincial electoral districts
