= Kevin Russell (politician) =

Canadian politician from New Brunswick

Member of the New Brunswick Legislative Assembly for Miramichi West
- Incumbent
- Assumed office October 6, 2025
- Preceded by: Michael Dawson

Personal details
- Party: Progressive Conservative

Kevin Earl Russell is a Canadian politician, who was elected to the Legislative Assembly of New Brunswick in a by-election on October 6, 2025. He was elected in the riding of Miramichi West.

Russell is the former mayor of Miramichi River Valley. He was the first mayor of the municipality, serving from its creation in 2023 until his election to the legislature in 2025.

== Electoral record ==
New Brunswick provincial by-election, October 6, 2025: Miramichi West Resignation of Mike Dawson
Party	Candidate	Votes	%	±%
Progressive Conservative	Kevin E. Russell	3,008	57.40	+0.33
Liberal	Hannah Fulton Johnston	2,047	39.06	+5.33
Green	Genevieve MacRae	98	1.87	-2.22
Independent	Richard (Hoss) Sutherland	62	1.18	-0.49
Libertarian	Christopher Rosser	25	0.48	
Total valid votes		5,240	99.85	
Total rejected ballots		8	0.15	-0.03
Turnout		5,248	52.61	-14.10
Eligible voters		9,976		
Progressive Conservative hold		Swing		–2.50
