= Richard Ames (Canadian politician) =

Canadian politician

Richard Ames MLA
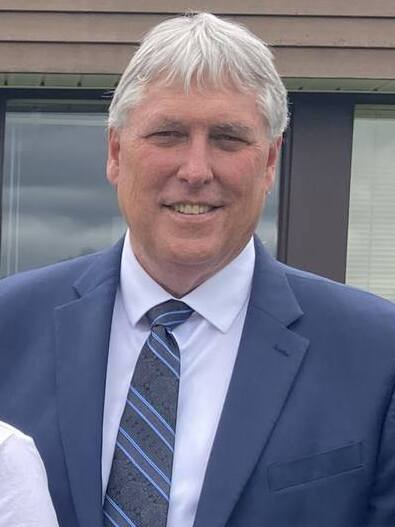
- Ames in 2024

Minister of Transportation and Infrastructure
- In office June 27, 2023 – November 2, 2024
- Preceded by: Jeff Carr
- Succeeded by: Chuck Chiasson

Member of the New Brunswick Legislative Assembly for Carleton-York
- Incumbent
- Assumed office September 14, 2020
- Preceded by: Carl Urquhart

Personal details
- Party: Progressive Conservative

Richard Ames is a Canadian Progressive Conservative politician who has represented Carleton-York in the Legislative Assembly of New Brunswick since 2020. He served in the cabinet of Blaine Higgs from 2023 to 2024 as Minister of Transportation and Infrastructure.

== Electoral record ==
=== Carleton-York ===
2024 New Brunswick general election: Carleton-York
Party	Candidate	Votes	%	±%
Progressive Conservative	Richard Ames	4,622	58.9%	+1.07
Liberal	Chris Duffie	2,136	27.2%	+15.76
Green	Burt Folkins	675	8.6%	-2.24
People's Alliance	Sterling Wright	415	5.3%	-13.25
Total valid votes		7,848		
Total rejected ballots				
Turnout				
Eligible voters				
Source: Elections New Brunswick

2020 New Brunswick general election
Party	Candidate	Votes	%	±%
Progressive Conservative	Richard Ames	4,750	57.83	+20.67
People's Alliance	Gary Lemmon	1,524	18.55	-12.24
Liberal	Robert Kitchen	940	11.44	-7.11
Green	Louise Comeau	890	10.84	+0.86
New Democratic	Jarrett Oldenburg	110	1.34	-1.70
Total valid votes		8,214	100.0	
Total rejected ballots		8	0.10	
Turnout		8,222	67.54	
Eligible voters		12,174		
Progressive Conservative hold		Swing		+16.46
Source: Elections New Brunswick
