= Libertarian Party of New Brunswick =

Libertarian Party of New Brunswick Parti Anti-Monarchique Britannique du NB
- Leader: Keith Tays
- President: François Provost
- Founded: July 16, 2024
- Headquarters: 48 L'etete Road St. George, New Brunswick E5C 3H4
- Ideology: Libertarianism, Individualism, Localism
- Colours: Navy Blue, Yellow
- Seats in the Legislative Assembly: 0 / 49

Website
- www.lpnb.ca

The Libertarian Party of New Brunswick is a provincial political party in the Canadian province of New Brunswick. It was formed in the months prior to the 2024 New Brunswick general election, with party leader Keith Tays saying "I don't expect to win any seats this early on just because we've had so little time to get the word out."

The party advocates for free market growth, and "reducing the size and intrusiveness of government, cutting and eliminating taxes at every opportunity, and allowing peaceful, honest people to offer their goods and services without inappropriate interference from the government", specifically referencing a proposed provincial police force, a provincial referendum to determine the breadth of issues like abortion, school choice and self-defence. Leader Keith Tays indicated that many of the initial party members had also opposed lockdowns and mandates during COVID-19.

The party identifies as neither left-wing nor right-wing, noting its mandate is to "take power away from government because it's not the role of government to interfere in people's lives and people's businesses...we're talking about cutting government in half". However, they have been described by CBC News as being on the "populist right" and by the Telegraph-Journal as being on the "political right".

== 2024 general election ==
In 2024, Libertarian Party fielded 18 candidates, winning 0.5% of the popular vote overall, behind the Liberals, Progressive Conservatives, Greens, NDP, and People's Alliance; further, they placed last in each riding contested by the party. Individual candidates received from 0.6% to 1.9% of the vote in their constituencies.

The election guide for the University of New Brunswick student newspaper, The Baron, described the Libertarian Party as "radically different...as they believe in a form of government that holds limited power, especially over one's wallet, body, and mind, meaning the government should hold the most power on a local level." In an editorial, the Telegraph-Journal daily newspaper welcomed the creation of the party prior to the election, while not endorsing it, calling it "a necessary balance on the political right" to the social conservativism of the Progressive Conservatives under Premier Blaine Higgs.

== Election results ==
Election	Leader	Votes	%	Number of candidates	Seats	+/–	Rank	Government	Source
2024	Keith Tays	1,710	0.5%	18 / 49	0 / 49	New party	6th	Extra-parliamentary	

2024 New Brunswick general election
Provincial Riding	Candidate	Total votes	% of votes	Rank
Albert-Riverview	William Jones	97	1.2%	5th of 5
Arcadia-Butternut Valley-Maple Hills	Anthony Matthews	149	1.9%	4th of 4
Beausoleil-Grand-Bouctouche-Kent	Eddy Richard	90	1.0%	5th of 5
Champdoré-Irishtown	Adam Hennessey	103	1.5%	4th of 4
Fredericton North	Andrew Vandette	46	0.6%	6th of 6
Fundy-The Isles-Saint John Lorneville	Keith Tays	88	1.3%	6th of 6
Hampton-Fundy-St. Martins	Barb Dempsey	120	1.4%	6th of 6
Hanwell-New Maryland	Meryl Sarty	67	0.7%	6th of 6
Kings Centre	Crystal Tays	139	1.8%	4th of 4
Restigouche West	Ron Geraghty	116	1.9%	4th of 4
Riverview	Rebecca Mallaley	69	0.9%	5th of 5
Rothesay	Austin Venedam	85	1.1%	4th of 4
Saint Croix	Krysten Mitchell	82	1.1%	7th of 7
Saint John East	Denise Campbell	92	1.3%	6th of 6
Saint John Harbour	Shelley Craig	82	1.4%	5th of 5
Saint John West-Lancaster	Sherie Vukelic	69	0.9%	5th of 5
Sussex-Three Rivers	Wayne Wheeler	159	1.9%	4th of 4
Tantramar	Donna Allen	57	1.1%	5th of 5

=== By-elections ===
By-election	Date	Candidate	Votes	%	Place
Miramichi West	October 6, 2025	Christopher Rosser	25	0.48	5/5
