= Legislative Assembly of New Brunswick =

Legislature of New Brunswick, Canada

Legislative Assembly of New Brunswick Assemblée législative du Nouveau-Brunswick
- 61st New Brunswick Legislature
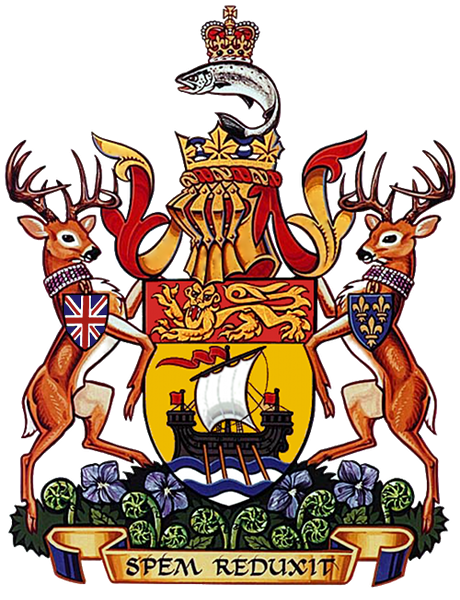

Type
- Type: Lower house (1786–1891) then unicameral house of the New Brunswick Legislature

History
- Founded: 1785; 241 years ago
- Preceded by: Nova Scotia House of Assembly

Leadership
- Speaker: Francine Landry, Liberal
- Premier: Susan Holt, Liberal since 2 November 2024
- Leader of the Opposition: Margaret Johnson, PC
- Government House Leader: Marco LeBlanc, Lib
- Opposition House Leader: Glen Savoie, PC

Structure
- Seats: 49
- Political groups: His Majesty's Government: Liberal (31); His Majesty's Loyal Opposition: Progressive Conservative (16); Other parties: Green (2)
- Salary: C$93,126 (2024 base salary)

Elections
- Last election: October 21, 2024
- Next election: TBD

Meeting place
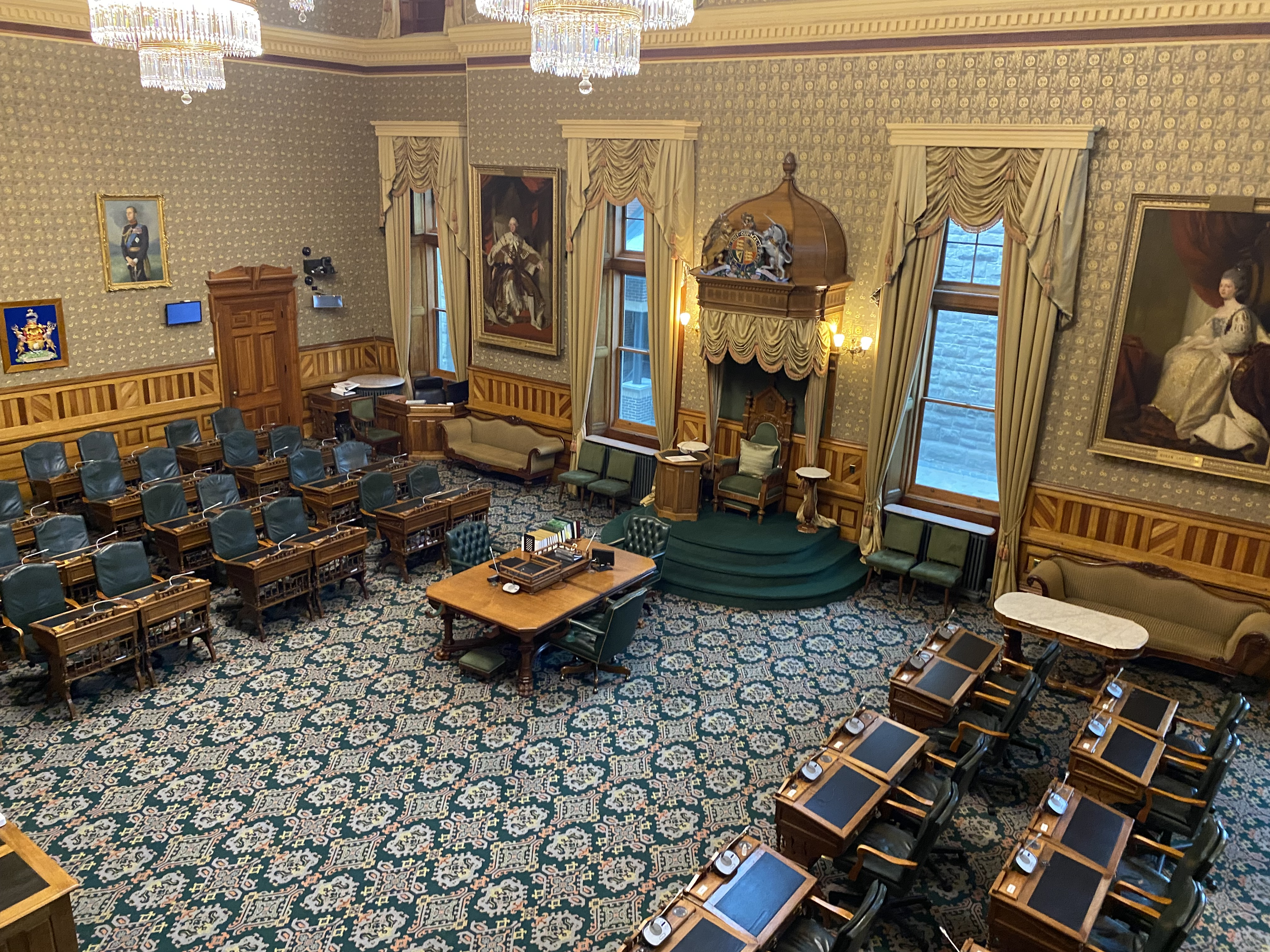
- Legislative Chamber, Legislative Building, Fredericton, New Brunswick, Canada

Website
- www.legnb.ca

The Legislative Assembly of New Brunswick (French: Assemblée législative du Nouveau-Brunswick) is the deliberative assembly of the New Brunswick Legislature, in the province of New Brunswick, Canada. The assembly's seat is located in Fredericton. It was established in Saint John de jure when the colony was created in 1784 but came into session only in 1786, following the first elections in late 1785. The legislative assembly was originally the lower house in a bicameral legislature. Its upper house counterpart, the Legislative Council of New Brunswick, was abolished in 1891. Its members are called "Members of the Legislative Assembly", commonly referred to as "MLAs".

== History ==
Nova Scotia originally covered most of the territory of today's Maritime provinces. In 1784, New Brunswick became a distinct colony from Nova Scotia. Saint John was chosen as the original capital when New Brunswick was formed as it was the centre of commerce and the only city at that time.

The first elections took place in November 1785. The legislative assembly came into session in January 1786. It was originally the lower house in a bicameral legislature. Its upper house counterpart, the Legislative Council of New Brunswick, was abolished on April 16, 1891.

== Legislative Building ==
The New Brunswick Legislative Building is the current building that houses the Assembly. It opened in 1882, having been constructed by J.C. Dumaresq, following the destruction of the original building, known as Province Hall, by fire in 1880.

The legislative chamber is designed to have four rows on the government side and three rows on the opposition side. This is because elections have traditionally yielded a strong government majority; in fact on occasion, even with many of the seats on one side of the House, the government has spilled over to the opposition side. Quite often the House is oriented to have only two rows on the opposition benches, in the event of a large opposition adding a third row makes the opposition benches rather crowded.

The assembly became an example of poor oversight in AI use when member Bill Oliver read AI prompts in a speech to lawmakers in June 2026.

== Current members ==
Name	Party	Riding	First elected/previously elected	Notes
Sherry Wilson	Progressive Conservative	Albert-Riverview	2010 g.e	
Don Monahan	Progressive Conservative	Arcadia-Butternut Valley-Maple Hills	2024 g.e	
René Legacy	Liberal	Bathurst	2020 g.e	
Benoît Bourque	Liberal	Beausoleil-Grand-Bouctouche-Kent	2014 g.e	
Marco LeBlanc	Liberal	Belle-Baie-Belledune	2023 b.e	
Isabelle Thériault	Liberal	Caraquet	2018 g.e.	
Margaret Johnson	Progressive Conservative	Carleton-Victoria	2020 g.e.	
Richard Ames	Progressive Conservative	Carleton-York	2020 g.e.	
Lyne Chantal Boudreau	Liberal	Champdoré-Irishtown	2024 g.e	
Natacha Vautour	Liberal	Dieppe-Memramcook	2024 g.e	
Jean-Claude D'Amours	Liberal	Edmundston-Vallée-des-Rivières	2018 g.e.	
Kris Austin	Progressive Conservative	Fredericton-Grand Lake	2018 g.e. (Note: First elected as a People's Alliance member)	Former People's Alliance leader
David Coon	Green	Fredericton-Lincoln	2014 g.e	Leader of Green party
Luke Randall	Liberal	Fredericton North	2024 g.e	
Susan Holt	Liberal	Fredericton South-Silverwood	2023 b.e.	Leader of Liberal Party/Premier
Ryan Cullins	Progressive Conservative	Fredericton-York	2020 g.e.	
Ian Lee	Progressive Conservative	Fundy-The Isles-Saint John Lorneville	2024 g.e.	
Chuck Chiasson	Liberal	Grand Falls-Vallée-des-Rivières-Saint-Quentin	2014 g.e	
John Herron	Liberal	Hampton-Fundy-St. Martins	2024 g.e	
Cindy Miles	Liberal	Hanwell-New Maryland	2024 g.e	
Luc Robichaud	Liberal	Hautes-Terres-Nepisiguit	2024 g.e	
Pat Finnigan	Liberal	Kent North	2024 g.e.	
Bill Oliver	Progressive Conservative	Kings Centre	2014 g.e.	
Francine Landry	Liberal	Madawaska Les Lacs-Edmundston	2014 g.e.	
Megan Mitton	Green	Memramcook-Tantramar	2018 g.e.	
Michelle Conroy	Progressive Conservative	Miramichi	2018 g.e.	
Sam Johnston	Liberal	Miramichi Bay-Neguac	2024 g.e	
Kevin Russell	Progressive Conservative	Miramichi West	2025 b.e.	
Rob McKee	Liberal	Moncton Centre	2018 g.e.	
Alexandre Cédric Doucet	Liberal	Moncton East	2024 g.e.	
Tania Sodhi	Liberal	Moncton Northwest	2024 g.e.	
Claire Johnson	Liberal	Moncton South	2024 g.e.	
Mary Wilson	Progressive Conservative	Oromocto-Sunbury	2018 g.e.	
John Dornan	Liberal	Portland-Simonds	2024 g.e	
Aaron Kennedy	Liberal	Quispamsis	2024 g.e.	
Guy Arseneault	Liberal	Restigouche East	2014 g.e.	
Gilles LePage	Liberal	Restigouche West	2018 g.e	
Rob Weir	Progressive Conservative	Riverview	2024 g.e.	
Alyson Townsend	Liberal	Rothesay	2024 g.e	
Kathy Bockus	Progressive Conservative	Saint Croix	2020 g.e.	
Glen Savoie	Progressive Conservative	Saint John East	2010 g.e. 2014 b.e	
David Hickey	Liberal	Saint John Harbour	2024 g.e.	
Kate Elman Wilcott	Liberal	Saint John West-Lancaster	2024 g.e.	
Robert Gauvin	Liberal	Shediac Bay-Dieppe	2018 g.e. (Note: First elected as a Progressive Conservative member)	
Jacques LeBlanc	Liberal	Shediac-Cap-Acadie	2018 g.e.	
Eric Mallet	Liberal	Shippagan-Les-Îles	2020 g.e.	
Tammy Scott-Wallace	Progressive Conservative	Sussex-Three Rivers	2020 g.e.	
Keith Chiasson	Liberal	Tracadie	2018 g.e.	
Bill Hogan	Progressive Conservative	Woodstock-Hartland	2020 g.e	

g.e. = general election, b.e. = by-election

== See also ==
- Category:Members of the Legislative Assembly of New Brunswick
- 53rd New Brunswick Legislative Assembly
- 54th New Brunswick Legislative Assembly
- 55th New Brunswick Legislative Assembly
- 56th New Brunswick Legislative Assembly
- 57th New Brunswick Legislative Assembly
- 58th New Brunswick Legislative Assembly
- 59th New Brunswick Legislative Assembly
- 60th New Brunswick Legislative Assembly
