= Progressive Conservative Party of New Brunswick =

Provincial political party in Canada

Progressive Conservative Party of New Brunswick Parti progressiste-conservateur du Nouveau-Brunswick
- Leader: Daniel Allain
- President: Norman Siebrasse
- Leader of the Opposition: Margaret Johnson
- Vice President: Diane Carey
- Representative & Official Agent: Robert Hatheway
- Executive Director: Doug Williams
- Founded: 1867
- Headquarters: 364 York Street, Suite 215 Fredericton, NB E3B 3P7
- Youth wing: PC Youth
- Women's wing: PC Women's Association
- Membership (2026): 5,632
- Ideology: Economic liberalism; Progressive conservatism; Factions: Conservatism (Canadian) Red Toryism; Right-wing populism
- Political position: Centre-right to right-wing
- Colours: Blue, red, and yellow
- Seats in Legislature: 16 / 49

Website
- www.pcnb.ca

The Progressive Conservative Party of New Brunswick is a conservative political party in the Canadian province of New Brunswick. The party has its origins in the pre-Canadian Confederation Conservative Party that opposed the granting of responsible government to the colony. It has historically followed the Red Tory tradition.

== History ==
Initially, Conservative supporters tended to be United Empire Loyalists and supporters of the business community. In the 1860s, the Conservative and Liberal parties split over the issue of Canadian Confederation and were replaced by the Confederation Party and the Anti-Confederation Party. By 1870, the pro-Confederation party became generally known as the Liberal-Conservatives or just “Conservatives," and were aligned with the national Conservative Party of Sir John A. Macdonald.

The party was aligned with the historic federal Conservative party. When the federal party changed its name to the Progressive Conservative Party of Canada in 1942, the New Brunswick party did the same. The federal Progressive Conservative Party dissolved in 2003, to merge with the Canadian Alliance and a new Conservative Party of Canada was created. The provincial party has no formal link with the current federal Conservative Party, but several of its members and elected MLAs, including former premier Premier Lord, publicly endorsed the federal party and in some cases its candidates in the 2004, 2006, 2008, 2011 and 2015 federal elections.

Following the change of government in 2006 provincial election, Bernard Lord resigned as leader on December 13, 2006, and as the member of Moncton East. On December 19, Jeannot Volpé, MLA for Madawaska les Lacs-Edmundston, was selected as interim leader. On October 18, 2008, David Alward, MLA for Carleton, was elected leader of the party at the Progressive Conservative Party of New Brunswick Leadership Convention in Fredericton. Alward beat his only opponent, Robert MacLeod, by a margin of 2,269 votes to 1,760.

The Progressive Conservatives won a sweeping majority, with 42 of 55 seats in the 2010 provincial election. In doing so, PC party leader David Alward became the 32nd premier of New Brunswick.

In 2013, Saint John area MLA Dr. Jim Parrott, a retired heart surgeon and former head of the New Brunswick Heart Centre, was kicked out of the caucus after criticizing his government over health issues.

The controversial backbencher had spoken out about bilingualism and duality, and written a newspaper commentary about a lack of consultation with physicians. Before the 2014 election, he was allowed to return

Alward's government was defeated after one term in the 2014 provincial election, after which Alward announced his resignation as party leader. On October 18, 2014, Bruce Fitch was selected as interim leader of the party and Leader of the Opposition of New Brunswick.

=== 2016–2023 ===
Quispamsis MLA Blaine Higgs was elected leader of the Progressive Conservative Party on October 22, 2016, defeating former Saint John Mayor Mel Norton, 1,563 to 1,169 on the third ballot.

In the 2018 provincial election, Higgs and the PCs won the largest share of seats in the legislature, 22, compared to 21 for the governing Liberal Party of New Brunswick, which opted to attempt to remain in power as a minority government by presenting a Throne Speech in hopes of retaining the confidence of the Legislative Assembly of New Brunswick.

On November 2, 2018, the Progressive Conservatives and the People's Alliance combined to defeat Premier Brian Gallant's Liberal minority government via a non-confidence vote in the legislature.

Higgs was appointed premier on November 9, 2018. Higgs and the Progressive Conservatives were re-elected to a majority government in the 2020 provincial election held on September 14, 2020,

On March 30, 2022, Kris Austin and Michelle Conroy announced their departure from the People's Alliance of New Brunswick to join the Progressive Conservative Party of New Brunswick.

=== Internal division (2023–2024) ===
Throughout 2023 and 2024, the Progressive Conservative Party of New Brunswick saw itself at a crossroads, with multiple PCNB cabinet ministers and MLAs breaking ranks with the party, with some politicians citing a misalignment with their own views and that of the social conservatism the party being described as exhibiting.

In April 2023, the Department of Education and Early Childhood Development, led by minister Bill Hogan and premier Higgs, placed Policy 713, an educational policy setting minimum requirements for public schools and districts in the province related to individuals identifying and perceived as LGBTQ, under review, later releasing a revised version in June 2023. The situation led to widespread criticism and internal division within the PC-led government. Shortly following the revision, long-standing cabinet ministers Dorothy Shephard and Trevor Holder resigned. Two additional cabinet ministers, Daniel Allain and Jeff Carr, expressed their “extreme disappointment in a lack of process and transparency” in a jointly signed letter following the revision. On June 15, 2023, all four of these ministers voted with the opposition parties which favoured a Liberal motion opposing the policy revision and called for increased consultation on the policy, leading to Higgs later dismissing both Allain and Carr from their respective cabinet positions, citing a breach of cabinet solidarity due to their support for the opposition motion on the policy.

Throughout early 2024, multiple PC MLAs and/or cabinet ministers, such as Arlene Dunn, Mike Holland, Carr, Allain, Shephard as well as Holder made announcements either resigning or opting out of running for re-election. In April 2024, cabinet minister Gary Crossman, who previously announced that he would be retiring after his term, also announced his resigning from the Legislative Assembly.

The party was defeated by the Liberals in the 2024 New Brunswick general election, with Higgs losing his own seat and resigning as leader. The leadership election to succeed Higgs was held on October 17, 2026 and won by Daniel Allain. Following Allain's victory, vocal critic Jason Purdy announced his intention to form a "conservatively-minded" breakaway New Brunswick Party. Purdy's criticism of Allain largely focused on his "socially progressive" orientation, describing the new leader as a "Liberal Lite, urban French activist."

== Ideology and electoral base ==
The Tories have alternated power with the New Brunswick Liberal Association since Confederation. The party tends to hold a moderate Red Tory stance, being socially and fiscally centrist. From the 2010s to the 2020s, the party underwent a shift to Blue Toryism after the election of Blaine Higgs as leader, who was premier from 2018 to 2024.

For most of New Brunswick's history, the party had greater support among English speakers, while the Liberals were more popular among Acadians. However, initiatives by the governments of Richard Hatfield and Bernard Lord to include Acadians in the mainstream of New Brunswick life helped the party make inroads in Acadia. In fact, even though he was born in Quebec, former premier Bernard Lord is widely perceived to be an Acadian, due to his Francophone heritage and the fact that he was raised in Moncton where he attended French language schools and university.

== Electoral performance ==
Election	Leader	Votes	%	Seats	+/–	Position	Status
1935	Leonard Tilley		40.2	5 / 48	▲5	▲2nd	Opposition
1939	Frederick Squires		45.0	19 / 48	▲14	2nd	Opposition
1944	Hugh Mackay		40.0	12 / 48	▼7	2nd	Opposition
1948	Hugh Mackay		31.2	5 / 52	▼7	2nd	Opposition
1952	Hugh John Flemming		48.9	36 / 52	▲31	▲1st	Majority
1956	Hugh John Flemming		52.2	37 / 52	▲1	1st	Majority
1960	Hugh John Flemming		46.2	21 / 52	▼16	▼2nd	Opposition
1963	Cyril Sherwood		48.2	20 / 52	▼1	2nd	Opposition
1967	Charles Van Horne		47.1	26 / 58	▲6	2nd	Opposition
1970	Richard Hatfield		48.4	32 / 58	▲6	▲1st	Majority
1974	Richard Hatfield	145,304	46.9	33 / 58	▲1	1st	Majority
1978	Richard Hatfield		44.4	30 / 58	▼3	1st	Majority
1982	Richard Hatfield		47.5	39 / 58	▲9	1st	Majority
1987	Richard Hatfield	116,798	28.6	0 / 58	▼39	▼2nd	No seats
1991	Dennis Cochrane	85,210	20.7	3 / 58	▲3	▼3rd	Third party
1995	Bernard Valcourt	120,247	30.9	6 / 55	▲3	▲2nd	Opposition
1999	Bernard Lord	209,008	53.0	44 / 55	▲38	▲1st	Majority
2003	Bernard Lord	174,092	45.5	28 / 55	▼16	1st	Majority
2006	Bernard Lord	177,744	47.5	26 / 55	▼2	▼2nd	Opposition
2010	David Alward	181,397	48.8	42 / 55	▲16	▲1st	Majority
2014	David Alward	128,848	34.6	21 / 49	▼21	▼2nd	Opposition
2018	Blaine Higgs	121,300	31.8	22 / 49	▲1	▲1st	Minority
2020	Blaine Higgs	147,490	39.3	27 / 49	▲5	1st	Majority
2024	Blaine Higgs	126,804	34.8	16 / 49	▼9	▼2nd	Opposition

== Current members of the legislature ==
Name	Electorate	First elected	Notes
Glen Savoie	Saint John East	2014	Interim Leader
Richard Ames	Carleton-York	2020	
Kris Austin	Fredericton-Grand Lake	2018	
Kathy Bockus	Saint Croix	2020	
Michelle Conroy	Miramichi East	2018	
Ryan Cullins	Fredericton-York	2020	
Bill Hogan	Woodstock-Hartland	2020	
Margaret Johnson	Carleton-Victoria	2020	
Ian Lee	Fundy-The Isles-Saint John Lorneville	2024	
Don Monahan	Arcadia-Butternut Valley-Maple Hills	2024	
Bill Oliver	Kings Centre	2014	
Kevin Russell	Miramichi West	2025 by-election	
Tammy Scott-Wallace	Sussex-Three Rivers	2020	
Mary Wilson	Oromocto-Sunbury	2018	
Sherry Wilson	Albert-Riverview	2010	
Rob Weir	Riverview	2024	

== Party leaders ==
- Peter Mitchell (1866–1867)
- Andrew R. Wetmore (1867–1870)
- George Edwin King (1870–1871)
- George L. Hathaway (1871–1872)
- George Edwin King (1872–1878)
- John James Fraser (1878–1882)
- Daniel L. Hanington (1882–1892)
- Alfred Augustus Stockton (1892–1899)
- John Douglas Hazen (1899–1911)
- James Kidd Flemming (1911–1914)
- George Johnson Clarke (1914–1917)
- James Alexander Murray (1917–1920)
- John B. M. Baxter (1920–1921)
- John Dickinson Palmer (1921)
- Charles D. Richards (1921–1925)
- John B. M. Baxter (1925–1931)
- Charles D. Richards (1931–1933)
- Leonard P. D. Tilley (1933–1935)
- Frederick C. Squires (1935–1939)
- Hugh H. Mackay (1939–1948)
- Hugh John Flemming (1948–1960) (House leader 1948–1951)
- Cyril Sherwood (1960–1966)
- Charles Van Horne (1966–1967)
- Richard Hatfield (1967–1987) (House leader 1967–1969)
- Malcolm MacLeod (1987–1989) (interim)
- Barbara Baird Filliter (1989–1991)
- Dennis Cochrane (1991–1995)
- Bernard Valcourt (1995–1997)
- Bernard Lord (1997–2007)
- Jeannot Volpé (2007–2008) (interim)
- David Alward (2008–2014)
- Bruce Fitch (2014–2016) (interim)
- Blaine Higgs (2016–2024)
- Glen Savoie (2024–2026) (interim)
- Daniel Allain (2026–present)

== See also ==
- List of premiers of New Brunswick
- List of New Brunswick political parties
- Progressive Conservative Party of New Brunswick leadership elections
