= Greg Byrne =

Canadian politician (born 1960)

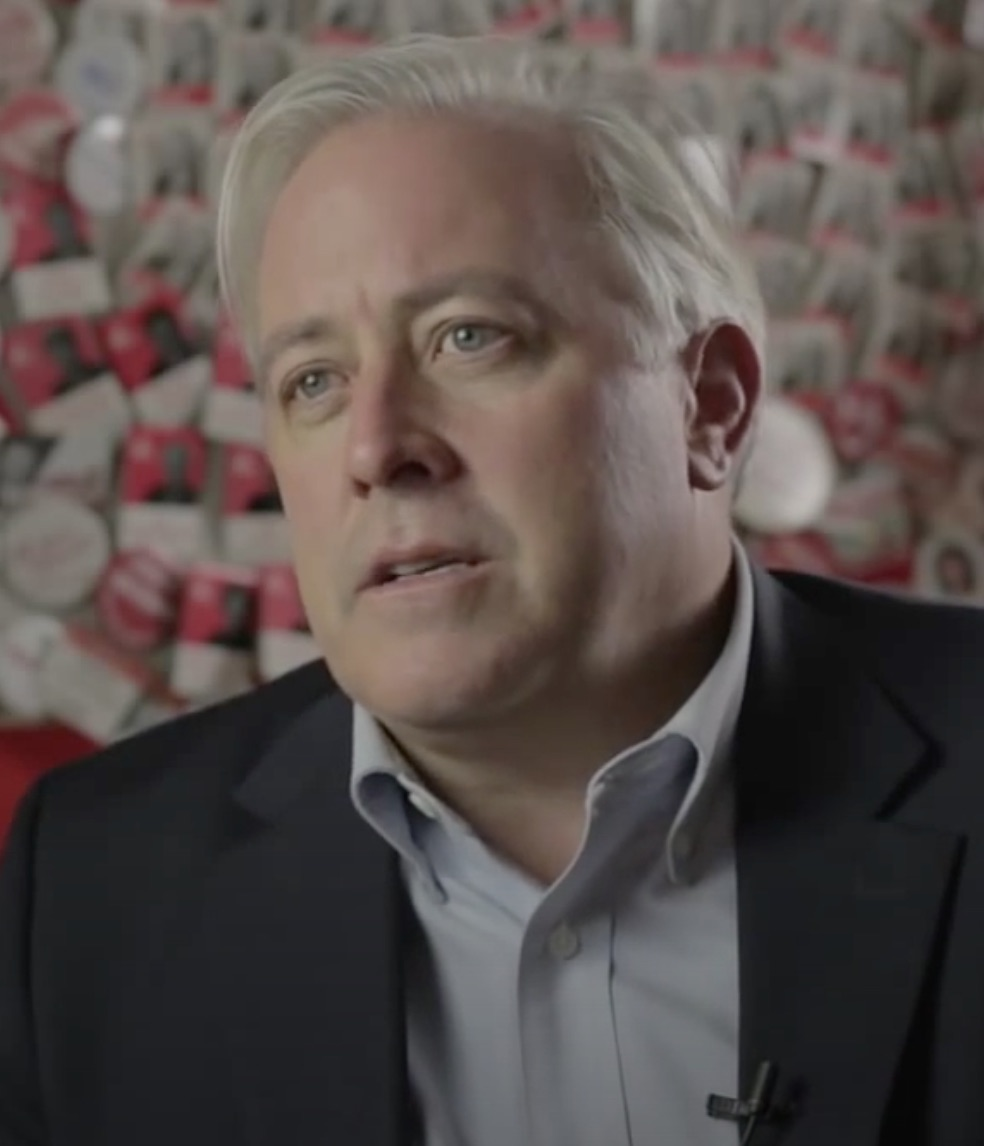

Member of the New Brunswick Legislative Assembly for Fredericton-Lincoln
- In office September 18, 2006 – September 27, 2010
- Preceded by: Riding Established
- Succeeded by: Craig Leonard

Member of the New Brunswick Legislative Assembly for Fredericton-Fort Nashwaak
- In office September 11, 1995 – June 7, 1999
- Preceded by: Riding Established
- Succeeded by: Eric MacKenzie

Personal details
- Born: April 14, 1960 (age 66) Harvey, New Brunswick
- Party: Liberal
- Occupation: Lawyer

Greg Byrne, KC (born April 14, 1960, in Harvey, New Brunswick) is a lawyer and former MLA in the province of New Brunswick, Canada.

Byrne was educated at Fredericton High School, Saint Thomas University (where he received a Bachelor of Arts in 1984) and the University of New Brunswick (where he received a Bachelor of Laws in 1987).

A Liberal, he was elected to the Legislative Assembly of New Brunswick in the 1995 provincial election. He joined the cabinet of Frank McKenna in 1997 as Minister responsible for Mines and Energy.

He resigned from cabinet in 1998 in order to run in the leadership convention to replace McKenna who had resigned later in 1997. Byrne finished second to Camille Thériault at the convention. Thériault named Byrne to his cabinet in the roles of Minister of Justice and Attorney General of New Brunswick, and Government House Leader.

A member of the Provincial Cabinet’s Board of Management and Priorities & Planning committees, he also sat on the Legislative Administration Committee, the Select Committee on Energy and served as Chairman of both the Law Amendments Committee and the Select Committee on Gasoline Pricing.

Like many of his Liberal colleagues, Byrne fell victim to the Progressive Conservative sweep in the 1999 election, losing his seat by only 264 votes.

In 2002, he co-chaired the successful leadership bid of Shawn Graham to succeed Thériault.

In 2003, he was elected president of the New Brunswick Liberals and he was re-elected in 2005. Byrne ran and won the riding of Fredericton-Lincoln running as a Liberal candidate in the 2006 election. Following the election, he stepped down as president of the party and was returned to the cabinet as Minister of Business New Brunswick. Minister Responsible for Population Growth, Minister Responsible for Service New Brunswick, Minister Responsible for Red Tape Reduction, and Minister Responsible for Communications New Brunswick.

He was subsequently appointed Minister of Finance, Minister Responsible for the New Brunswick Liquor Corporation, Minister Responsible for the Lotteries and Gaming Commission and Minister Responsible for the New Brunswick Investment Management Corporation.

Byrne failed to regain his seat in the general election of 2010, when the Graham government was defeated by David Alward and the Progressive Conservative Party.

He also served as chief of staff in the Office of the Official Opposition and chief of staff and principal secretary in the Office of the Premier. He is the president and CEO of Clonmore Associates.

== Sources ==
- Cache of Byrne's bio from the New Brunswick Legislaturehttps://ca.linkedin.com/in/greg-byrne-q-c-5a48b19 https://www.aims.ca/site/media/aims/EventByrneBio.pdf https://www.facebook.com/gregbyrneNB/about_work_and_education https://globalnews.ca/news/7284375/new-brunswick-election-oromocto-lincoln-fredericton-2020/ https://www.voixfemmesnb-voiceswomennb.ca/content/dam/gnb/Departments/petl-epft/PDF/PopGrowth/Strategy-e.pdf https://www.stu.ca/alumni/alumni-awards/alumni-association-award-for-service/2017/ https://ca.linkedin.com/in/greg-byrne-q-c-5a48b19

New Brunswick provincial government of Shawn Graham
Cabinet posts (2)
Predecessor	Office	Successor
Victor Boudreau	Minister of Finance; 2009–2010	Blaine Higgs
Kirk MacDonald	Minister of Business New Brunswick; 2006–2009	Victor Boudreau
Special Cabinet Responsibilities
Predecessor	Title	Successor
Mike Murphy	Government House Leader; 2010	Paul Robichaud
Bernard Lord	Minister responsible for Communications New Brunswick; 2006–2009	Victor Boudreau
Dale Graham	Minister responsible for Service New Brunswick; 2006–2009	Victor Boudreau
Percy Mockler	Minister responsible for the Population Growth Secretariat; 2006–2009; Immigration and Repatriation Secretariat until April 2007	Victor Boudreau
New Brunswick provincial government of Camille Thériault
Cabinet post (1)
Predecessor	Office	Successor
James E. Lockyer	Minister of Justice and Attorney General; 1998–1999	Brad Green
Special Cabinet Responsibilities
Predecessor	Title	Successor
None	Minister responsible for Service New Brunswick; 1998–1999	Bernard Lord
Doug Tyler	Government House Leader; 1998–1999	Brad Green
New Brunswick provincial government of Ray Frenette
Special Cabinet Responsibilities
Predecessor	Title	Successor
cont'd from McKenna ministry	Minister of State for Mines & Energy; 1997–1998 designation discontinued	None
New Brunswick provincial government of Frank McKenna
Special Cabinet Responsibilities
Predecessor	Title	Successor
Albert Doucet	Minister of State for Mines & Energy; 1997 post was vacant for several months following Doucet's resignation	cont'd into Frenette ministry
