= Fredericton-Fort Nashwaak (1995–2006) =

Defunct provincial electoral district in New Brunswick, Canada

New Brunswick electoral district
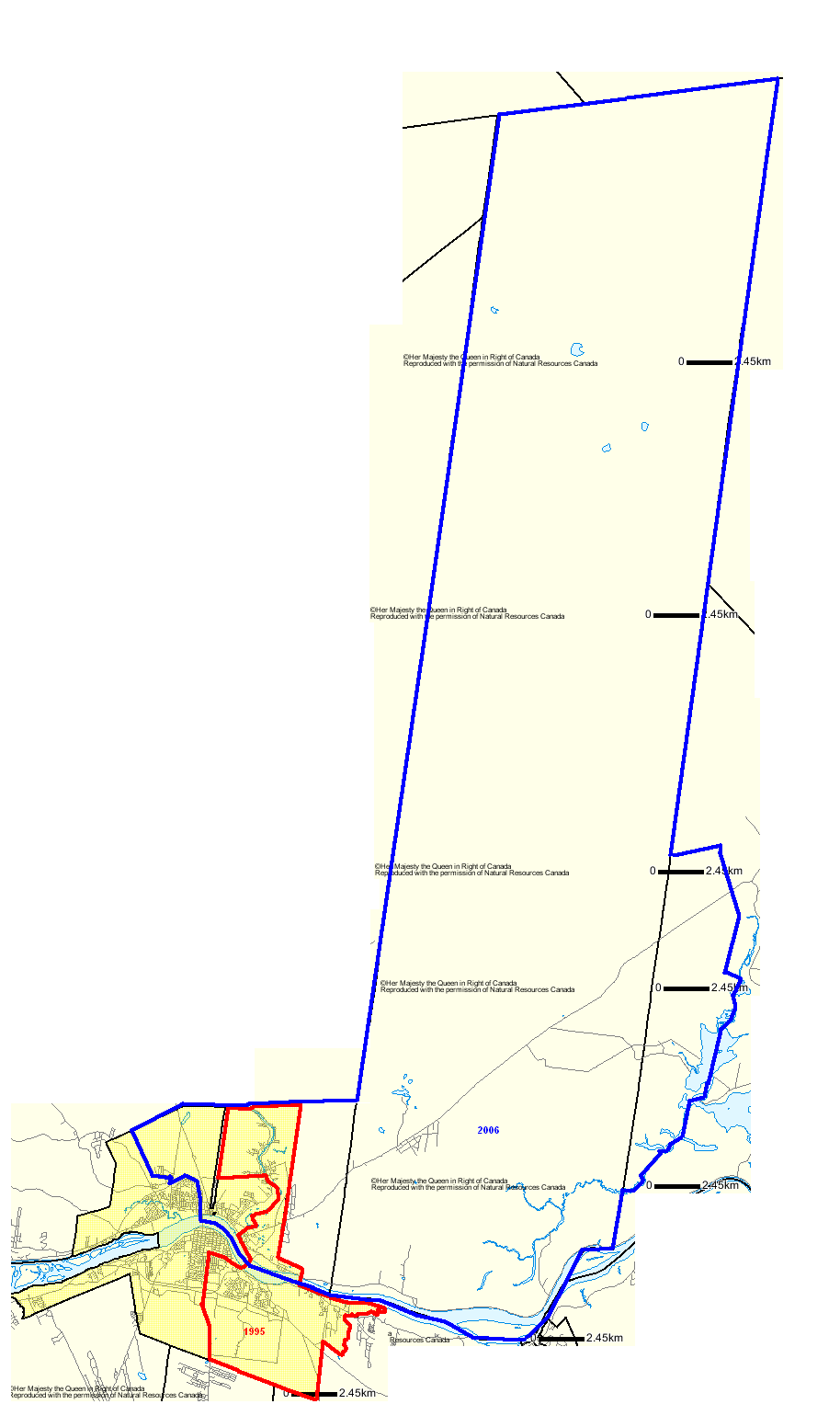
- A map depicting the boundaries of the former district of Fredericton-Fort Nashwaak (1995–2006) in red with the new boundaries (2006 to present) in blue

Defunct provincial electoral district
- Legislature: Legislative Assembly of New Brunswick
- District created: 1994
- District abolished: 2006
- First contested: 1995
- Last contested: 2003

Fredericton-Fort Naswaak was a provincial electoral district returning members to the Legislative Assembly of New Brunswick, Canada, for three elections: 1995, 1999, and 2003.

It was created in the 1994 electoral redistribution taking in the easternmost portions of the city of Fredericton taking about half of its territory from each of Fredericton North and Fredericton South on either side of the Saint John River.

It elected Liberals Greg Byrne and Kelly Lamrock in the 1995 and 2003 elections respectively but elected Progressive Conservative Eric MacKenzie by a narrow margin in 1999 when his party swept the province winning 80% of the seats.

The district was abolished in the 2006 electoral redistribution when the Boundary Commission expressed a desire to use the Saint John River as a natural boundary between districts. Somewhat confusingly though, the commission re-used the name Fredericton-Fort Nashwaak for a new district wholly on the north side of the Saint John River using all of the territories from that side of the river from this district as well as substantial portions of Fredericton North and Grand Lake.

== Members of the Legislative Assembly ==
Assembly	Years	Member	Party
Riding created from Fredericton North and Fredericton South
53rd	1995–1999	Greg Byrne	Liberal
54th	1999–2003	Eric MacKenzie	Progressive Conservative
55th	2003–2006	Kelly Lamrock	Liberal
Riding dissolved into Fredericton-Lincoln and Fredericton-Fort Nashwaak (2006–2013)

== Election results ==
2003 New Brunswick general election
Party	Candidate	Votes	%	±%
Liberal	Kelly Lamrock	2,925	42.89	+1.43
Progressive Conservative	Eric MacKenzie	2,364	34.66	-10.88
New Democratic	Penny Ericson	1,531	22.45	+11.41
Total valid votes		6,820	100.0	
Liberal gain from Progressive Conservative		Swing		+6.16

1999 New Brunswick general election
Party	Candidate	Votes	%	±%
Progressive Conservative	Eric MacKenzie	2,949	45.54	+22.99
Liberal	Greg Byrne	2,685	41.46	-8.47
New Democratic	Pat A. Kennedy	715	11.04	-3.27
Confederation of Regions	David Alexander Brown	96	1.48	-11.72
Natural Law	Andie Haché	31	0.48	–
Total valid votes		6,476	100.0	
Progressive Conservative gain from Liberal		Swing		+15.73

1995 New Brunswick general election
Party	Candidate	Votes	%	±%
Liberal	Greg Byrne	3,241	49.93	
Progressive Conservative	Brent Bishop	1,464	22.55	
New Democratic	Patricia Kennedy	929	14.31	
Confederation of Regions	Nancy Curtis	857	13.20	
Total valid votes		6,491	100.0	
Liberal notional gain		Swing		

== See also ==
- List of New Brunswick provincial electoral districts
- Canadian provincial electoral districts
