= Saint John Portland-Simonds =

Provincial electoral district in New Brunswick, Canada

Coordinates: 45.311°N 66.060°W

New Brunswick electoral district
- The riding of Saint John Portland-Simonds (as it exists from 2023) in relation to other New Brunswick electoral districts

Provincial electoral district
- Legislature: Legislative Assembly of New Brunswick
MLA
John Dornan
Liberal
- District created: 1994
- First contested: 1995
- Last contested: 2024

Demographics
- Population (2011): 17,032
- Electors (2013): 11,175

Saint John Portland-Simonds (fr Saint-Jean Portland-Simonds) is a provincial electoral district for the Legislative Assembly of New Brunswick, Canada. It was originally created for the 1995 provincial election as Saint John Portland and its boundaries were altered slightly in 2006. It in the 2013 redrawing of boundaries its boundaries were moved significantly southward into territory previously part of Saint John East; though the boundaries commission did not recommend a name change, a committee of the legislative assembly later voted to change the name to Portland-Simonds. The riding name refers to Portland and Simonds Parish in Saint John County.

The riding was renamed Saint John Portland-Simonds following the 2023 redistribution.

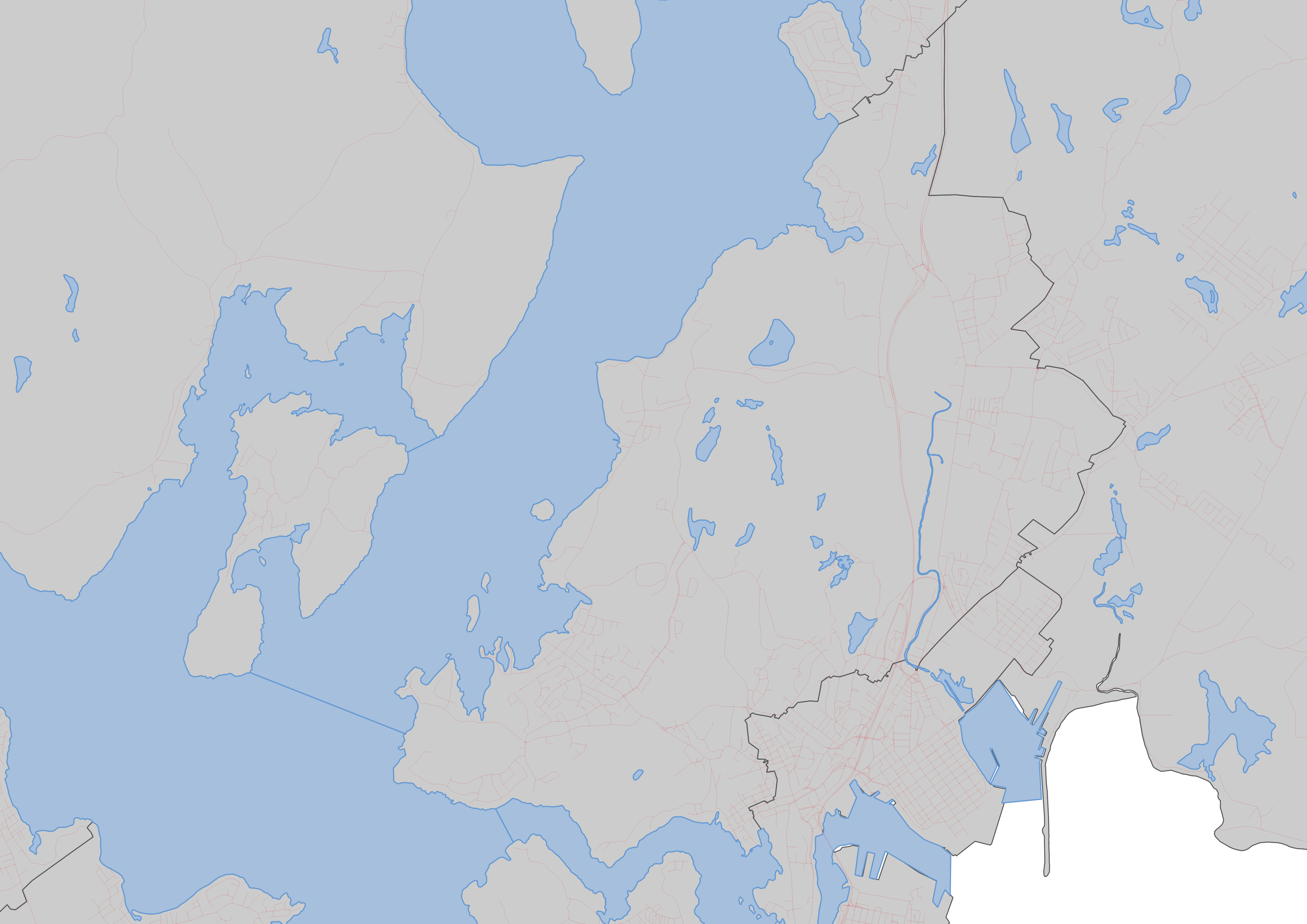
Saint John Portland-Simonds (as it exists from 2023) and the roads in the riding

== Members of the Legislative Assembly ==
Assembly	Years	Member	Party
Saint John Portland; Riding created from Saint John North and Saint John Park
53rd	1995–1999	Leo McAdam	Liberal
54th	1999–2003	Trevor Holder	Progressive Conservative
55th	2003–2006	Trevor Holder	Progressive Conservative
56th	2006–2010	Trevor Holder	Progressive Conservative
57th	2010–2014	Trevor Holder	Progressive Conservative
Portland-Simonds
58th	2014–2018	Trevor Holder	Progressive Conservative
59th	2018–2020	Trevor Holder	Progressive Conservative
60th	2020–2024	Trevor Holder	Progressive Conservative
Saint John Portland-Simonds
61st	2024–Present	John Dornan	Liberal

== Election results ==
=== Saint John Portland-Simonds ===
2024 New Brunswick general election
** Preliminary results — Not yet official **
Party	Candidate	Votes	%	±%
Liberal	John Dornan	3,546	53.38	+24.8
Progressive Conservative	Paul Dempsey	2,497	37.59	-17.2
Green	P. J. Duncan	438	6.59	-2.0
New Democratic	~~Bobby Martin~~	162	2.44	-0.3
Total valid votes		6,643	99.76	
Total rejected ballots		16	0.24	
Turnout		6,659	56.11	
Eligible voters		11,867		
Liberal gain from Progressive Conservative		Swing		+21.0
Source: Elections New Brunswick

2020 provincial election redistributed results
Party	%
Progressive Conservative	54.8
Liberal	28.6
Green	8.6
People's Alliance	5.2
New Democratic	2.7
Independents	0.1

=== Portland-Simonds ===
2020 New Brunswick general election
Party	Candidate	Votes	%	±%
Progressive Conservative	Trevor Holder	3,170	55.10	+1.82
Liberal	Tim Jones	1,654	28.75	+0.11
Green	Stefan Warner	483	8.40	+1.08
People's Alliance	Lindsay Jackson	282	4.90	–
New Democratic	Erik Heinze-Milne	164	2.85	-4.70
Total valid votes		5,753	99.62	
Total rejected ballots		22	0.38	-0.12
Turnout		5,775	52.05	-1.71
Eligible voters		11,095		
Progressive Conservative hold		Swing		+0.86

2018 New Brunswick general election
Party	Candidate	Votes	%	±%
Progressive Conservative	Trevor Holder	3,168	53.28	+4.38
Liberal	John MacKenzie	1,703	28.64	-4.85
New Democratic	Kim Blue	449	7.55	-5.51
Green	Sheila Croteau	435	7.32	+2.77
Independent	Artie Watson	191	3.21	--
Total valid votes		5,946	99.50	
Total rejected ballots		30	0.50	
Turnout		5,976	54.53	
Eligible voters		10,959		

2014 New Brunswick general election
Party	Candidate	Votes	%	±%
Progressive Conservative	Trevor A. Holder	2,782	48.90	-1.28
Liberal	Michael Butler	1,905	33.49	-1.88
New Democratic	Tony Sekulich	743	13.06	+3.23
Green	Sheila Croteau	259	4.55	+1.31
Total valid votes		5,689	100.0	
Total rejected ballots		16	0.28	
Turnout		5,705	51.43	
Eligible voters		11,093		
Progressive Conservative notional hold		Swing		+0.30
Source: Elections New Brunswick

=== Saint John Portland ===
2010 New Brunswick general election
Party	Candidate	Votes	%	±%
Progressive Conservative	Trevor Arthur Holder	2,925	50.18	+0.21
Liberal	Dan Joyce	2,062	35.37	-9.96
New Democratic	Jeremy Higgins	573	9.83	+5.13
Green	Stefan Warner	189	3.24	–
People's Alliance	Lisa Cromwell	80	1.37	–
Total valid votes		5,829	100.0	
Total rejected ballots		30	0.51	
Turnout		5,859	62.31	
Eligible voters		9,403		
Progressive Conservative hold		Swing		+5.08
Source: Elections New Brunswick

2006 New Brunswick general election
Party	Candidate	Votes	%	±%
Progressive Conservative	Trevor Holder	2,987	49.97	+8.92
Liberal	Colleen Knudson	2,710	45.33	+6.45
New Democratic	Clare Mudge	281	4.70	-15.37
Total valid votes		5,978	100.0	
Progressive Conservative hold		Swing		+1.24

2003 New Brunswick general election
Party	Candidate	Votes	%	±%
Progressive Conservative	Trevor Holder	2,436	41.05	-18.56
Liberal	Colleen Knudson	2,307	38.88	+12.53
New Democratic	Mary Arseneau	1,191	20.07	+6.74
Total valid votes		5,934	100.0	
Progressive Conservative hold		Swing		-15.54

1999 New Brunswick general election
Party	Candidate	Votes	%	±%
Progressive Conservative	Trevor Holder	3,773	59.61	+25.98
Liberal	Leo McAdam	1,668	26.35	-12.74
New Democratic	Pam F. Coates	844	13.33	-10.66
Natural Law	Miville Couture	45	0.71	–
Total valid votes		6,330	100.0	
Progressive Conservative gain from Liberal		Swing		+19.36

1995 New Brunswick general election
Party	Candidate	Votes	%	±%
Liberal	Leo McAdam	2,454	39.06	
Progressive Conservative	Trevor Holder	2,113	33.63	
New Democratic	Greg Barry	1,507	23.99	
Confederation of Regions	Terry Van Duzee	209	3.33	
Total valid votes		6,283	100.0	
Liberal notional hold		Swing		

== See also ==
- List of New Brunswick provincial electoral districts
- Canadian provincial electoral districts
