= Campbellton-Dalhousie =

Provincial electoral district in New Brunswick, Canada

New Brunswick electoral district
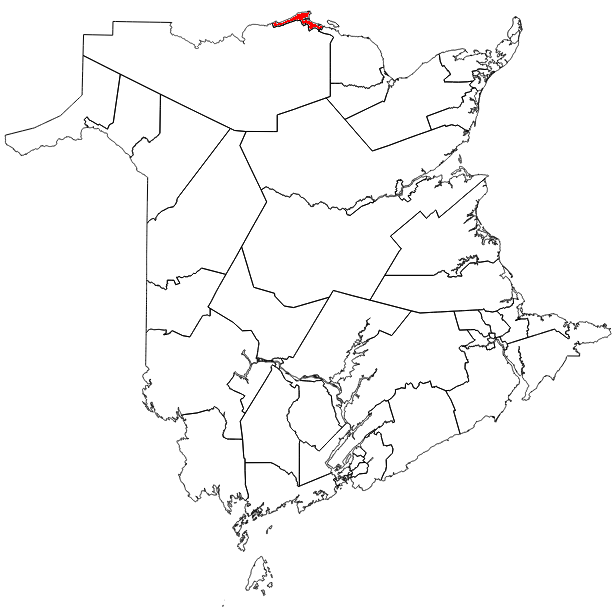
- The riding of Campbellton-Dalhousie in relation to other New Brunswick electoral districts.
- Coordinates: 48.034°N 66.449°W

Defunct provincial electoral district
- Legislature: Legislative Assembly of New Brunswick
- District created: 2013
- District abolished: 2023
- First contested: 2014
- Last contested: 2020

Demographics
- Population (2011): 14,942
- Electors (2013): 11,760
- Census division(s): Restigouche
- Census subdivision(s): Campbellton, Dalhousie

Campbellton-Dalhousie was a provincial electoral district for the Legislative Assembly of New Brunswick, Canada. It was contested in the 2014 general election, having been created in the 2013 redistribution of electoral boundaries by combining portions of the Campbellton-Restigouche Centre and Dalhousie-Restigouche East electoral districts. The election was won by Donald Arseneault of the Liberal party.

The district is the geographically smallest in predominantly rural Northern New Brunswick, consisting of the city of Campbellton, the town of Dalhousie and communities along a 20 km stretch of road between them.

The seat was vacated November 30, 2017; Arsenault was given an ultimatum by Liberal Leader Brian Gallant in reference to a perceived conflict of interest. This was not the first time he held the spotlight in controversy; in an infamous deal, over $70 million of taxpayer money (known as the Atcon Scanda) was lost through the decision making of the Liberal Caucus of which he was part (2009). The seat was won by Guy Arseneault on September 24, 2018.

== Members of the Legislative Assembly ==
Assembly	Years	Member	Party
Riding created from Dalhousie-Restigouche East and Campbellton-Restigouche Centre
58th	2014–2017	Donald Arseneault	Liberal
59th	2018–2020	Guy Arseneault	Liberal
60th	2020–2024	Guy Arseneault	Liberal
Riding dissolved into Restigouche East and Restigouche West

== Election results ==
2020 New Brunswick general election
Party	Candidate	Votes	%	±%
Liberal	Guy Arseneault	4,540	65.20	+14.91
Progressive Conservative	Charles Stewart	1,369	19.66	-4.15
Green	Marie-Christine Allard	1,054	15.14	+6.53
Total valid votes		6,963	100.00	
Total rejected ballots		42	0.60	-0.06
Turnout		7,005	64.29	-2.63
Eligible voters		10,896		
Liberal hold		Swing		+9.53
Source: Elections New Brunswick

2018 New Brunswick general election
Party	Candidate	Votes	%	±%
Liberal	Guy Arseneault	3,720	50.29	-11.96
Progressive Conservative	Diane Cyr	1,761	23.81	-0.46
New Democratic	Thérèse Tremblay	721	9.75	-0.09
Green	Annie Thériault	637	8.61	+4.97
People's Alliance	Robert Boudreau	558	7.54	--
Total valid votes		7,397	100.00	
Total rejected ballots		49	0.66	
Turnout		7,446	66.92	
Eligible voters		11,127		
Liberal hold		Swing		-5.75
Source: Elections NB

2014 New Brunswick general election
Party	Candidate	Votes	%
Liberal	Donald Arseneault	4,820	62.25
Progressive Conservative	Joe. G. Elias	1,879	24.27
New Democratic	Jamie O'Rourke	762	9.84
Green	Heather Wood	282	3.64
Total valid votes		7,743	100.00
Total rejected ballots		49	0.63
Turnout		7,792	66.93
Eligible voters		11,642	
This riding was created from parts of Dalhousie-Restigouche East and Campbellton-Restigouche Centre, which elected a Liberal and a Progressive Conservative, respectively, in the previous election. Donald Arseneault was the incumbent from Dalhousie-Restigouche East.
Source: Elections New Brunswick
