= Bathurst East-Nepisiguit-Saint-Isidore =

Provincial electoral district in New Brunswick, Canada

New Brunswick electoral district
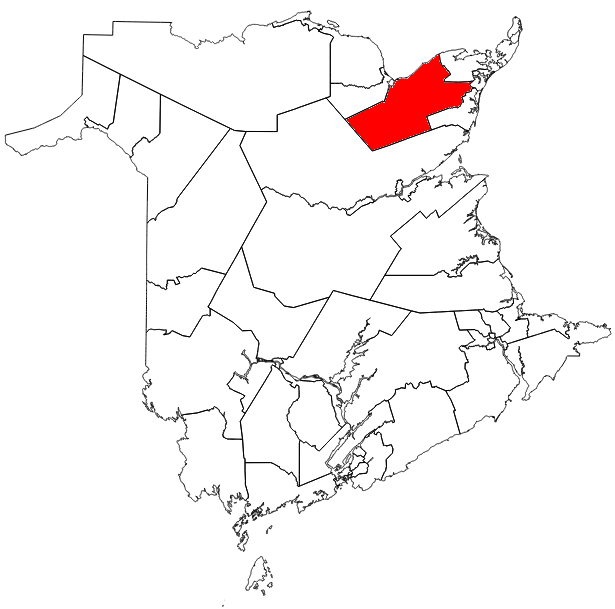
- The riding of Bathurst East-Nepisiguit-Saint-Isodore in relation to other New Brunswick electoral districts
- Coordinates: 47.631°N 65.359°W

Defunct provincial electoral district
- Legislature: Legislative Assembly of New Brunswick
- District created: 2013
- District abolished: 2023
- First contested: 2014
- Last contested: 2020

Demographics
- Population (2011): 13,824
- Electors (2013): 11,230
- Census division(s): Gloucester
- Census subdivision(s): (2023) Bathurst, Chaleur Rural District, Hautes-Terres, Tracadie

Bathurst East-Nepisiguit-Saint-Isidore (French: Bathurst-Est-Nepisiguit-Saint-Isidore) was a provincial electoral district for the Legislative Assembly of New Brunswick, Canada. It was first contested in the 2014 general election, and it was created in the 2013 redistribution of electoral boundaries, largely by combining the ridings of Nepisiguit and Centre-Péninsule-Saint-Sauveur with the eastern half of the electoral district of Bathurst, and a small section of Caraquet.

The district included the city of Bathurst east of the Middle River, and several communities in the northwestern extremes of the Acadian Peninsula.

== Members of the Legislative Assembly ==
Assembly	Years	Member	Party
Riding created from Centre-Péninsule-Saint-Sauveur, Nepisiguit, Bathurst and Caraquet
58th	2014–2018	Denis Landry	Liberal
59th	2018–2020	Denis Landry	Liberal
60th	2020–2022	Denis Landry	Liberal
60th	2023–2024	Susan Holt	Liberal
Riding dissolved into Hautes-Terres-Nepisiguit, Bathurst and Tracadie

== Election results ==
New Brunswick provincial by-election, April 24, 2023 Resignation of Denis Landry to run for mayor of Hautes-Terres
Party	Candidate	Votes	%	±%
Liberal	Susan Holt	2,343	58.85	-4.91
Green	Serge Brideau	1,411	35.44	+23.22
New Democratic	Alex White	227	5.70	
Total valid votes		3,981	99.30	
Total rejected ballots		28	0.70	+0.29
Turnout		4,009	37.59	-23.01
Eligible voters		10,666		
Liberal hold		Swing		-14.06
Source: Elections New Brunswick

2020 New Brunswick general election
Party	Candidate	Votes	%	±%
Liberal	Denis Landry	4,163	63.76	+11.97
Progressive Conservative	Amanda Keast	1,568	24.02	+11.50
Green	Robert Kryszko	798	12.22	+6.08
Total valid votes		6,529	99.59	
Total rejected ballots		27	0.41	-0.21
Turnout		6,556	60.60	-2.93
Eligible voters		10,819		
Liberal hold		Swing		+0.24
Source: Elections New Brunswick

2018 New Brunswick general election
Party	Candidate	Votes	%	±%
Liberal	Denis Landry	3,550	51.79	-9.77
New Democratic	Jean Maurice Landry	2,026	29.56	+21.79
Progressive Conservative	Michelle Branch	858	12.52	-13.80
Green	Robert Kryszko	421	6.14	+1.78
Total valid votes		6,855	99.38	
Total rejected ballots		43	0.62	+0.17
Turnout		6,898	63.52	-0.19
Eligible voters		10,859		
Liberal hold		Swing		-15.78

2014 New Brunswick general election
Party	Candidate	Votes	%
Liberal	Denis Landry	4,431	61.56
Progressive Conservative	Ryan Riordon	1,894	26.31
New Democratic	Benjamin Kalenda	559	7.77
Green	Gerry J. Aubie	314	4.36
Total valid votes		7,198	99.54
Total rejected ballots		33	0.46
Turnout		7,231	63.71
Eligible voters		11,349	
This riding was created from parts of Centre-Péninsule-Saint-Sauveur, Nepisiguit, Bathurst and Caraquet, which elected three Liberals and one Progressive Conservative (Nepisiguit) in the previous election. Denis Landry was the incumbent from Centre-Péninsule-Saint-Sauveur, and Ryan Riordon was the incumbent from Nepisiguit.
Source: Elections New Brunswick
