= David Coon =

Canadian politician

David Coon MLA
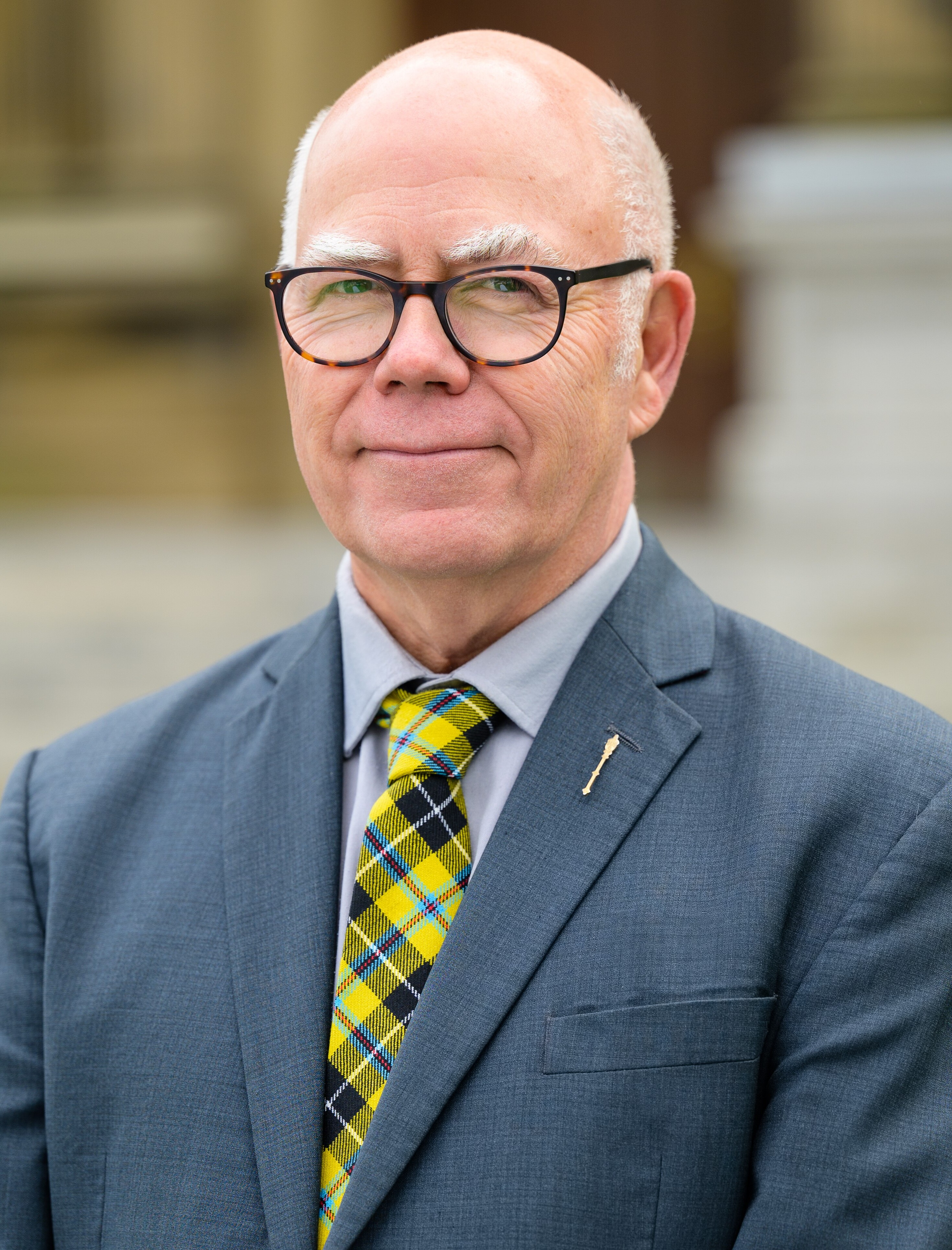
- Coon in 2023

Leader of the Green Party of New Brunswick
- Incumbent
- Assumed office September 21, 2012
- Preceded by: Greta Doucet (interim)

Member of the New Brunswick Legislative Assembly for Fredericton-Lincoln
- Incumbent
- Assumed office October 21, 2024

Member of the New Brunswick Legislative Assembly for Fredericton South
- In office September 22, 2014 – October 21, 2024

Personal details
- Born: David Charles Coon; October 28, 1956 (age 69) Toronto, Ontario
- Party: Green
- Spouse: Janice Harvey
- Children: 2
- Education: McGill University (BSc, 1978)

David Charles Coon MLA (born October 28, 1956) is a Canadian conservationist and politician who has served as leader of the Green Party of New Brunswick since 2012 and as a Member of the Legislative Assembly of New Brunswick since 2014, elected three times in Fredericton South and a fourth time to represent the newly constituted riding of Fredericton-Lincoln.

Born in Toronto, Ontario, Coon was raised in Montreal, Quebec, where he graduated from high school. He later graduated from McGill University and received a diploma from Vanier College, and began working with the Conservation Council of New Brunswick. Having previously done work with the Green Party of Canada, Coon entered provincial politics full-time in 2012 after being elected to lead the Green Party of New Brunswick, which was formed just four years prior.

Coon joined the 58th Legislature after being elected to represent the newly contested provincial electoral district of Fredericton South in 2014, becoming the first ever Green legislative member in New Brunswick and the second provincial Green politician in Canada to win a seat in a provincial legislature. He was re-elected in 2018 and again in 2020. Following an electoral redistribution in 2023, Coon's elected riding was replaced with two new electoral districts; he was elected in the new riding of Fredericton-Lincoln in the 2024 provincial election.

== Early life and education ==
David Charles Coon was born on October 28, 1956, in Toronto, Ontario, the eldest child of Charles Coon and Iris Page. He spent his childhood in Montreal, Quebec, where he graduated from high school. Coon later attended McGill University, primarily studying ecology, where he graduated with a Bachelor of Science in 1978. Coon later reflected that "while I was at McGill a Green Peace chapter was started there which I got very involved in." He additionally attended Vanier College, where he received a Pure and Applied Science diploma. In 1985, Coon later moved to New Brunswick and started working with the Conservation Council of New Brunswick (CCNB), serving as its policy director.

== Conservation career ==
Coon worked as an environmental educator, organizer, activist and manager for 33 years, 28 of those years with the CCNB.

In 1986, Coon critiqued a United States Department of Energy-proposed nuclear waste dump site near Maine's Bottle Lake, stating that "burying this stuff at Bottle Lake is an inexpensive and rough way of getting these things out of sight and out of mind." He also criticized Irving Oil for having "not shown much interest in trying to solve the pollution problem" in relation to a series of gas leak incidents causing pollution throughout New Brunswick, particularly in the Saint John area. In 1988, following an apology towards Canadians by Vermont official Jonathan Lash for the lack of U.S. progress to combat acid rain, Coon criticized the governments of New Brunswick and Nova Scotia for "causing much of the acid rain problem in their provinces." He added that "approximately 80% of the acid rain-causing pollution emitted in the Atlantic Provinces is caused by the New Brunswick Power Commission and the Nova Scotia Power Corporation," also highlighting that both "have plans for new coal-fired power plants." Sharing the risk of acid rain in the region, Coon pointed out 175 bodies of water in New Brunswick "known to be at risk from acid rain" and added that "half the lakes and rivers in southern Nova Scotia are deteriorating."

As part of the CCNB, Coon was also involved in the anti-nuclear movement in New Brunswick which opposed the construction and subsequent upgrades of the nuclear reactor at the Point Lepreau Nuclear Generating Station. In 1989, Coon stated that "the mere possibility of a serious accident with the reactor or radioactive waste stored at the site is too great a risk to justify expansion of nuclear power in the province," further adding that "It's one of the newest and it cost us a billion dollars – it better work."

In 2002, Coon received the New Brunswick Environmental Network (NBEN) Phoenix Award for "his devotion to conservation and sustainable communities and for his thoughtful guidance, which has been a source of strength and inspiration for New Brunswick's environmental movement over the past two decades." Later that year, he also received a silver award in the Canadian Geographic-sponsored Canadian Environment Awards, and received another NBEN Phoenix Award along with fellow CCNB member Inka Milewski in 2004.

In 2006, Coon criticized Irving Oil's proposal for another refinery in Saint John, stating "apparently, Mr. Irving hasn't heard we're in the midst of a global meltdown. Every new barrel of oil that is pumped out of the ground and refined is making the problem worse." Coon has also provided education and training in energy efficient home renovation and home-based renewable energy systems, writing a regular column for The Globe and Mail on the topic. During his time as Policy Director at the Conservation Council, Coon's work to protect drinking water led to the creation of New Brunswick's Clean Water Act and to the province's Petroleum Product Handling and Storage Regulation. This earned the New Brunswick environmental organization the United Nations Environmental Programme's Global 500 award.

Coon has advocated for community-based ecological resource management and land use. He worked with commercial fishermen's organizations to establish the Bay of Fundy Fisheries Council to advance community-based fishery management. His collaboration with the National Farmers Union helped create the first agricultural conservation club in New Brunswick.

He was a founding director of Canada's first community supported agricultural initiative, Harvest Share Co-operative on Keswick Ridge, and co-founded the New Brunswick Community Land Trust.

In 2008, Coon began serving as the CCNB's executive director. Following a 2011 radioactive spill at Point Lepreau, the only nuclear power plant in Atlantic Canada, Coon pushed for more details to be released to the public about the incident, stating that "they need to release the actual information on the radiation levels and exposures that might have resulted in this case."

== Leader of the Green Party of New Brunswick (2012–present) ==
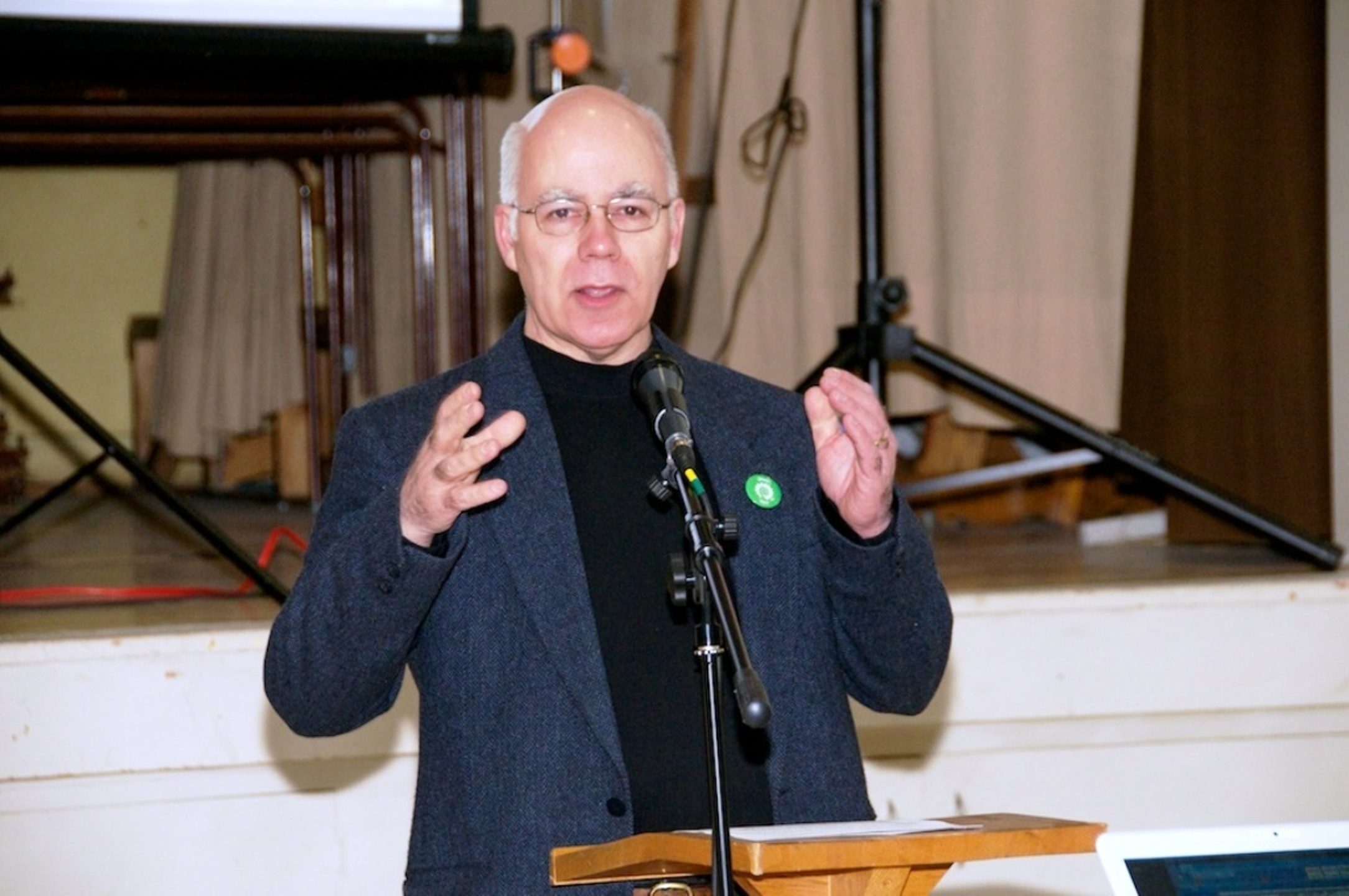
Coon in 2013

Prior to becoming elected as leader of the Green Party of New Brunswick, Coon had been elected to two terms on the governing council of the Green Party of Canada. During his run for leadership of the New Brunswick Greens, Coon committed to serve as a full-time leader. After Green Party leader Jack MacDougall has stepped down following the 2010 election the party had been led by part-time interim leaders for the subsequent two years. full-time;. His only other contender for leadership was Roy MacMullin, who sought plans for the party to work with the NDP and People's Alliance parties. The leadership convention was held at the Fredericton Convention Centre. Out of the 208 votes cast between both candidates, Coon received 131 votes and was elected as the provincial Green Party leader, succeeding interim leader Greta Doucet.

In 2013, following the opening of a Starbucks in Moncton which only had English menus, Coon advocated for sign legislation similar to that enforced in the neighbouring, largely-Francophone city of Dieppe, which would, due to New Brunswick's official bilingual status, require for international businesses to include both English and French signage. Although the proposal was considered by critics to be "excessive", Moncton was previously voted to be the first officially bilingual city in Canada and had already required bilingual government-provided services.

In March 2014, Coon demanded for the provincial government under David Alward to publicly release a contract they signed with J. D. Irving to "guarantee wood supply from Crown land." He criticized the agreement, which allowed for 21% more softwood to be cut, and argued that "New Brunswickers and First Nations have a right to know what David Alward has signed away to the Irvings." He expressed concerns for the potentiality of the public of the province having "to compensate J.D. Irving if public efforts to rebuild local forest economies, establish community forests, resolve aboriginal title, or increase conservation measures in the future diminishes the amount of wood the government has agreed to provide the company over the long term," limiting future government actions, further adding that "First Nations and all New Brunswickers have a right to see what obligation the Alward government has imposed on us with this contract." Paul Robichaud, the Minister of Natural Resources, responded by stating that "the agreements between the government and forest companies will be announced publicly after an initial round of announcements by industry." In May 2014, Coon criticized the provincial government's proposal, through the Department of Natural Resources, to extend the moose hunting season deadline, calling it "completely political." Arguing that the proposal prioritized efforts to garner votes over environmental protection, Coon stated that "politicians can't buy people's votes with a bottle of rum anymore and they can't afford to buy them with tax cuts so what are they left with?" In response, Robichaud argued a potential economic boost for the province being a reason to increase the season.

=== MLA for Fredericton South (2014–present) ===
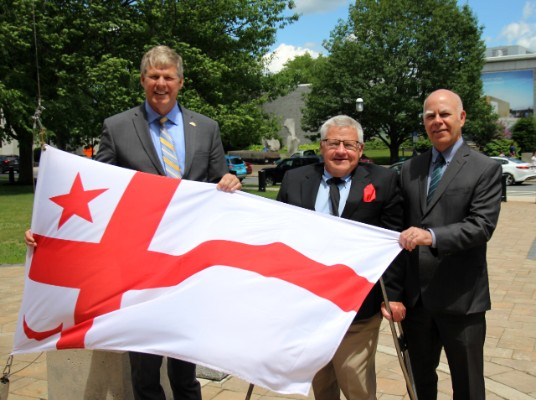
Coon (right) holding a Mi'kmaq Grand Council flag with Stephen Horsman (left) and Ed Doherty (center), 2017

During the 2014 provincial election, Coon campaigned for the newly created seat of Fredericton South in the Legislative Assembly; his campaign was supported by a number of former NDP members, including former candidate Penny Ericson and former leader Allison Brewer, who said that he "offers a unique perspective to politics." As opposed to other parties at the time, Coon and his party had a particularly strict opposition towards gas fracking, as well as the controversial proposed oil pipeline, Energy East. He also made the proposal to improve access to abortion, which emerged as an issue following the closure of New Brunswick's only private abortion service-providing clinic in July. Coon won the seat with 31% of the vote against three other candidates, including Craig Leonard, the previous Energy Minister for the Progressive Conservatives. He became New Brunswick's first Green legislative member, and the second member of a provincial Green Party to win a seat in a provincial legislature, following Andrew Weaver in British Columbia.

Since his election in 2014, Coon has introduced private member's bills aimed at increasing local food security and expanding local agriculture, creating jobs in energy efficient building renovations and renewable energy, lowering the voting age, protecting citizens against frivolous lawsuits. He has championed improving access to both mental and primary health care, alleviating poverty, the provision of midwifery services, climate action, and forest management that is socially and ecologically sound. In 2015, Coon attended the 2015 United Nations Climate Change Conference under the invitation of Brian Gallant.

During his political career, Coon has advocated for the government to fulfill calls to action made by the Truth and Reconciliation Commission. In 2016, he called for government funding towards mandatory public school programs which would introduce the endangered Maliseet language to curriculums, which he had been advocating for since 2010. Later that year, Coon spoke with University of New Brunswick director David Perley, which led to him introducing a private member's bill focused on improving the public school curriculum on indigenous education. On May 5, 2017, the bill was granted royal assent after being passed by the government.

He has served as a member of the Standing Committee on Estimates and Fiscal Policy, the Standing Committee on Procedure, Privileges and Legislative Officers, and the Legislative Administration Committee. He also served as a member of the Select Committee on Climate Change, whose recommendations formed the basis of New Brunswick's Climate Action Plan.

Coon was re-elected to Fredericton South in the 2018 provincial election, with his party also electing two more MLAs: Kevin Arseneau in the riding of Kent North and Megan Mitton in the riding of Memramcook-Tantramar. The party was early to release a full party platform, with 120 commitments including a ban on glyphosate spraying.

During the 2020 provincial election, the Greens secured CA$303 thousand in donations for their campaign – more than any other third party in the province. Coon, along with Arseneau and Mitton, were all re-elected to their respective seats.

In September 2023, Coon appointed both Arseneau and Mitton as deputy leaders for the Green Party. Following an electoral redistribution that same year, Coon's incumbent riding was to be replaced with two new electoral districts; he is running in the new riding of Fredericton-Lincoln for the 2024 provincial election.

In June 2026, Coon announced that he would resign as party leader upon the election of a successor.

== Personal life ==
During his work at the CCNB, Coon met his future wife, Janice Harvey, a St. Thomas University educator who served as the CCNB director at the time, during an environmental meeting. They have two daughters, and had a son who died at birth. Coon and his family lived in Fredericton before moving to rural Waweig in Charlotte County for a number of years, then later returned to Fredericton in late 2012 to live in his planned candidacy riding of Fredericton-Silverwood, which was abolished following the 2013 electoral redistribution. As of 2023, Coon continues to live in Fredericton within the boundaries of the Fredericton South-Silverwood riding.

== Electoral record ==
2014 New Brunswick general election
Party	Candidate	Votes	%
Green	David Coon	2,272	30.68
Progressive Conservative	Craig Leonard	1,938	26.17
Liberal	Roy Wiggins	1,601	21.62
New Democratic	Kelly Lamrock	1,465	19.78
Independent	Courtney Mills	130	1.76
Total valid votes		7,406	100.0
Total rejected ballots		18	0.24
Turnout		7,424	71.27
Eligible voters		10,417	
This district was created from parts of Fredericton-Silverwood and Fredericton-Lincoln, both elected a Progressive Conservative in the previous election. Craig Leonard was the incumbent from Fredericton-Lincoln.
Source: Elections New Brunswick, CBC News

2018 New Brunswick general election
Party	Candidate	Votes	%	±%
Green	David Coon	4,273	56.31	+25.63
Liberal	Susan Holt	1,525	20.10	-1.52
Progressive Conservative	Scott Smith	1,042	13.73	-12.44
People's Alliance	Bonnie Clark	616	8.12	--
New Democratic	Chris Durrant	132	1.74	-18.04
Total valid votes		7,588	100.0	
Total rejected ballots				
Turnout				
Eligible voters				
Green hold		Swing		+13.6

2020 New Brunswick general election
Party	Candidate	Votes	%	±%
Green	David Coon	4,213	54.01	-2.70
Progressive Conservative	Brian MacKinnon	2,342	30.02	+16.71
Liberal	Nicole Picot	895	11.47	-8.91
People's Alliance	Wendell Betts	234	3.00	-4.83
New Democratic	Geoffrey Noseworthy	117	1.50	-0.25
Total valid votes		7,801	99.77	
Total rejected ballots		18	0.23	
Turnout		7,819	71.04	
Eligible voters		11,006		
Green hold		Swing		-9.71

2024 New Brunswick general election: Fredericton-Lincoln
Party	Candidate	Votes	%	±%
Green	David Coon	3,646	44.5%	+11.0
Progressive Conservative	Daniel Chippin	2,307	28.1%	-8.8
Liberal	Joni Leger	2,244	27.4%	+5.6
Total valid votes		8,197		
Total rejected ballots				
Turnout				
Eligible voters				
Green notional gain from Progressive Conservative		Swing		+9.9
Source: Elections New Brunswick

== See also ==
- List of Green party leaders in Canada
