= Oromocto-Lincoln-Fredericton =

Provincial electoral district in New Brunswick, Canada

New Brunswick electoral district
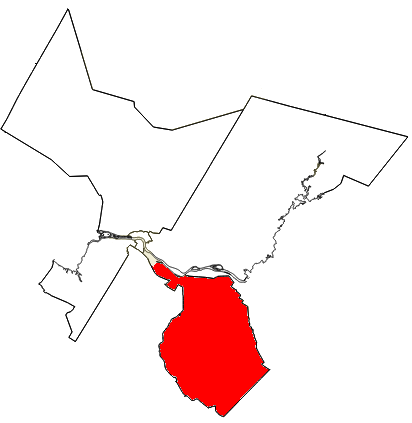
- The riding of Oromocto-Lincoln-Fredericton in relation to other Fredericton electoral districts. The parts of the riding within Fredericton are gold, the balance of the riding is red.
- Coordinates: 45.665°N 66.317°W

Defunct provincial electoral district
- Legislature: Legislative Assembly of New Brunswick
- District created: 2013
- District abolished: 2023
- First contested: 2014
- Last contested: 2020

Demographics
- Population (2011): 19,275
- Electors (2013): 11,367
- Census division(s): Sunbury, York

Oromocto-Lincoln-Fredericton was a provincial electoral district for the Legislative Assembly of New Brunswick, Canada. It was first contested in the 2014 general election, created in the 2013 redistribution of electoral boundaries from portions of the former ridings of Oromocto and Fredericton-Lincoln.

The district included all of the Town of Oromocto, the unincorporated community of Lincoln and CFB Gagetown, as well as a significant portion of the City of Fredericton. The riding was named Oromocto-Lincoln from 2014 to 2017 until it was renamed to recognize the significant portion of Fredericton contained in the riding.

== Members of the Legislative Assembly ==
| Assembly | Years | Member | Party |
|---|---|---|---|
Riding created from Oromocto and Fredericton-Lincoln
| 58th | 2014–2018 | Jody Carr | Progressive Conservative |
| 59th | 2018–2020 | Mary Wilson | Progressive Conservative |
| 60th | 2020–2024 | Mary Wilson | Progressive Conservative |
Riding dissolved into Oromocto-Sunbury and Fredericton-Lincoln

== Election results ==
2020 New Brunswick general election
| Party | Candidate | Votes | % | ±% |
|---|---|---|---|---|
| Progressive Conservative | Mary Wilson | 3,374 | 44.25 | +12.30 |
| Liberal | Steven Burns | 2,072 | 27.18 | -3.48 |
| Green | Gail Costello | 1,306 | 17.13 | +5.13 |
| People's Alliance | Craig Rector | 745 | 9.77 | -13.42 |
| New Democratic | Natasha Akhtar | 127 | 1.67 | -0.45 |
| Total valid votes | | 7,624 | 99.61 | |
| Total rejected ballots | | 30 | 0.39 | |
| Turnout | | 7,654 | 64.71 | |
| Eligible voters | | 11,829 | | |
| Progressive Conservative hold | | Swing | | +7.89 |

2018 New Brunswick general election
| Party | Candidate | Votes | % | ±% |
|---|---|---|---|---|
| Progressive Conservative | Mary Wilson | 2,399 | 31.95 | -10.02 |
| Liberal | John Fife | 2,306 | 30.66 | -4.29 |
| People's Alliance | Craig Rector | 1,741 | 23.19 | +18.47 |
| Green | Tom McLean | 903 | 12.00 | +6.37 |
| New Democratic | Justin Young | 159 | 2.12 | -10.60 |
| Total valid votes | | 7,508 | 100.0 | |
| Total rejected ballots | | 14 | | |
| Turnout | | 7,522 | 66.53 | |
| Eligible voters | | 11,306 | | |

2014 New Brunswick general election
| Party | Candidate | Votes | % |
|---|---|---|---|
| Progressive Conservative | Jody Carr | 2,827 | 41.97 |
| Liberal | Trisha Hoyt | 2,354 | 34.95 |
| New Democratic | Amanda Diggins | 857 | 12.72 |
| Green | Jean Louis Deveau | 379 | 5.63 |
| People's Alliance | Jeff Langille | 318 | 4.72 |
| Total valid votes | | 6,735 | 100.0 |
| Total rejected ballots | | 19 | 0.28 |
| Turnout | | 6,754 | 60.61 |
| Eligible voters | | 11,144 | |
This riding was created from parts of Oromocto and Fredericton-Lincoln, both elected a Progressive Conservative in the previous election. Jody Carr was the incumbent from Oromocto.
Source: Elections New Brunswick
