= 2014 New Brunswick general election =

Canadian provincial election

- September 22, 2014

49 seats in the Legislative Assembly of New Brunswick 25 seats needed for a majority
- Turnout: 64.65%
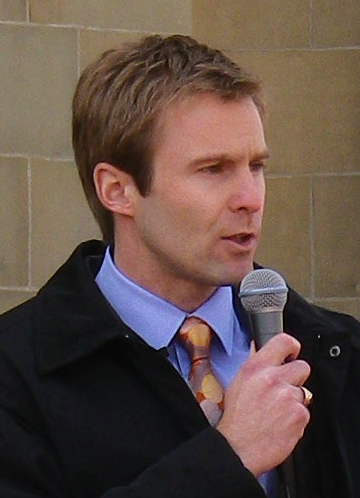

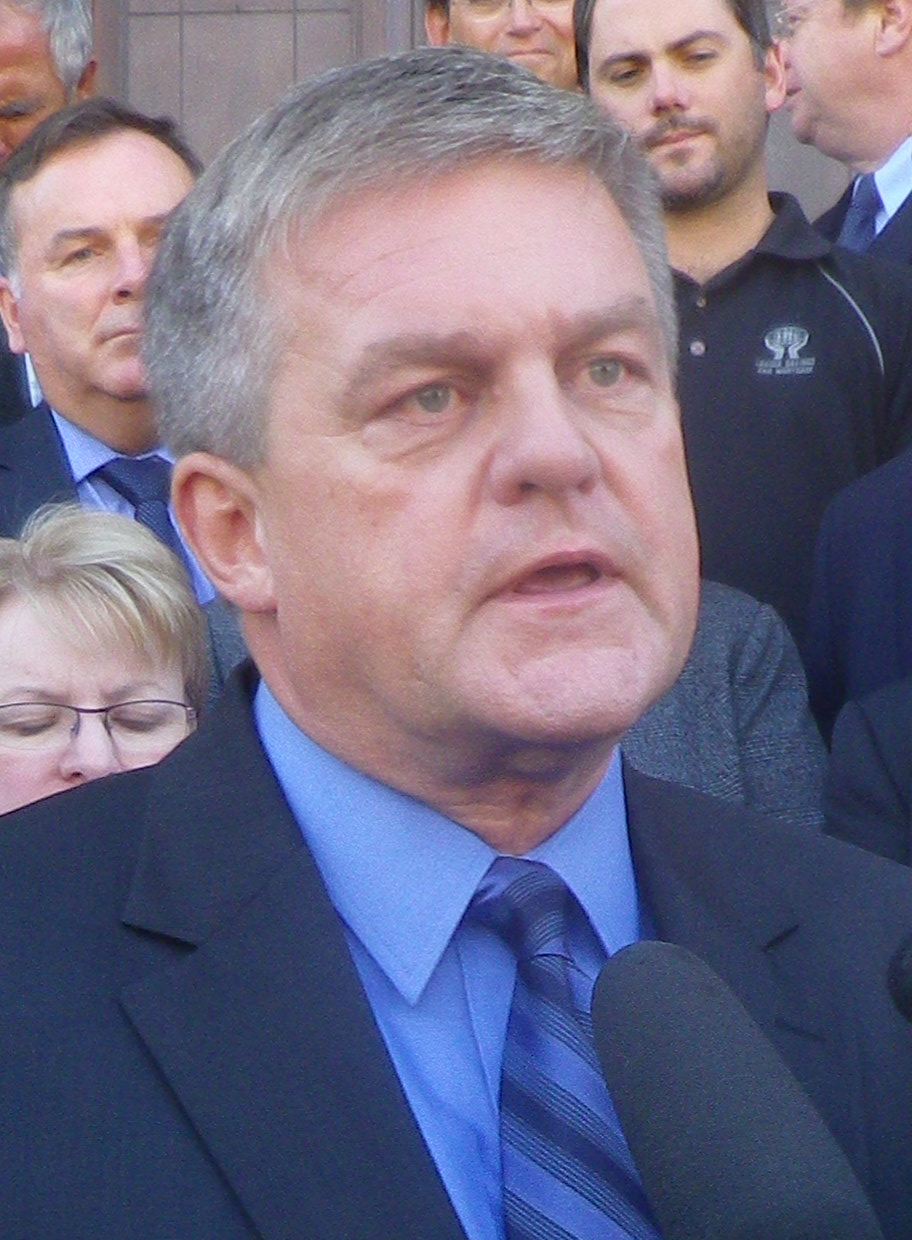

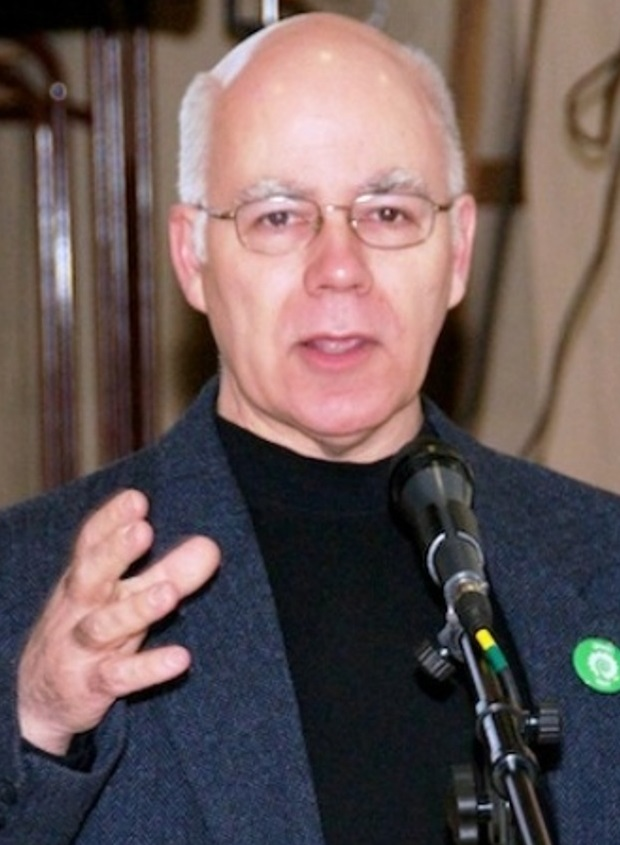

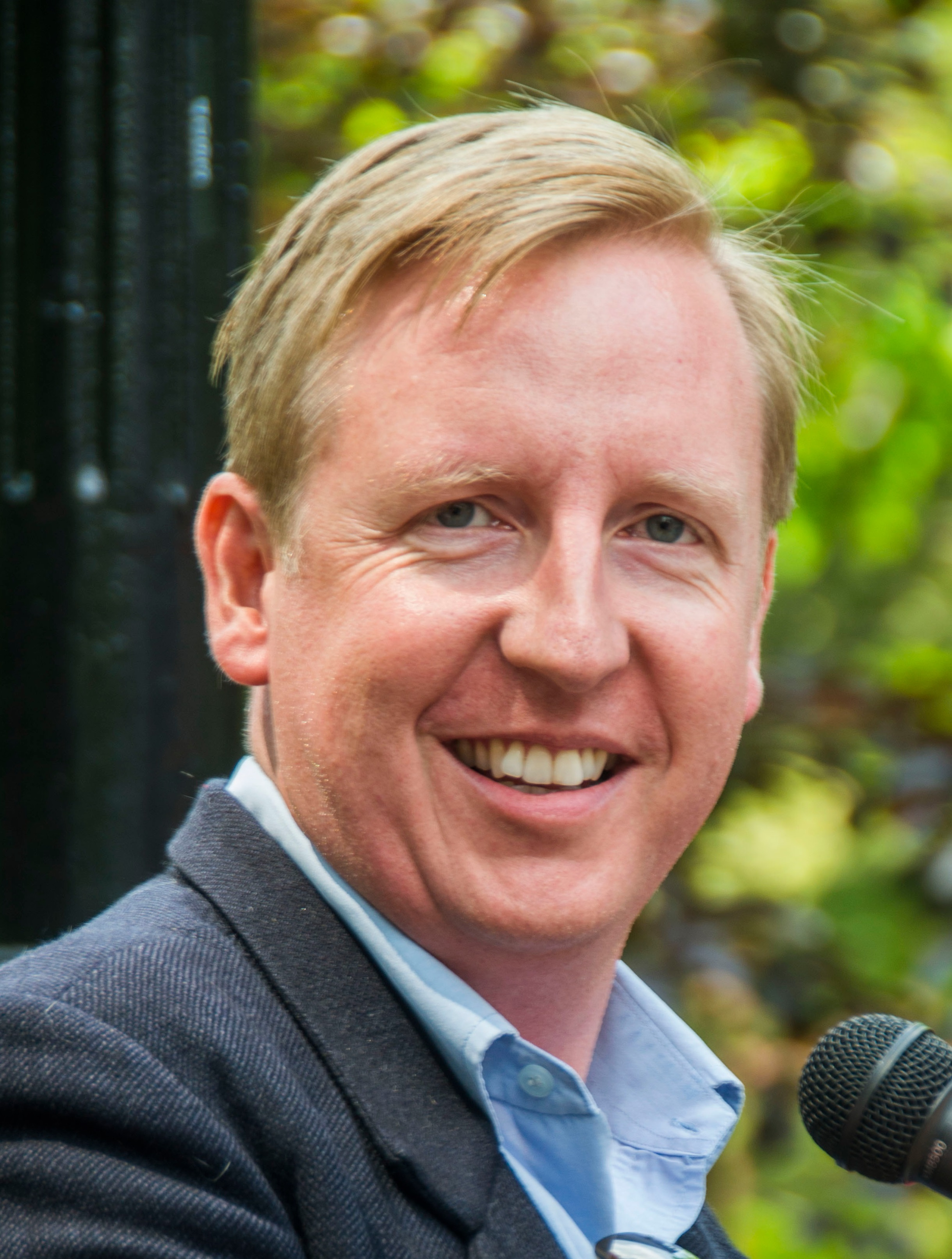
	Majority party	Minority party
Leader	Brian Gallant	David Alward
Party	Liberal	Progressive Conservative
Leader since	October 27, 2012	October 18, 2008
Leader's seat	Shediac Bay-Dieppe	Carleton
Last election	13 seats, 34.42%	42 seats, 48.84%
Seats before	13	41
Seats won	27	21
Seat change	▲14	▼20
Popular vote	158,852	128,799
Percentage	42.73%	34.65%
Swing	▲8.31pp	▼14.19pp
	Third party	Fourth party
Leader	David Coon	Dominic Cardy
Party	Green	New Democratic
Leader since	September 22, 2012	March 2, 2011
Leader's seat	Fredericton South	ran in Fredericton West-Hanwell (lost)
Last election	0 seats, 4.54%	0 seats, 10.41%
Seats before	0	0
Seats won	1	0
Seat change	▲1	Steady
Popular vote	24,572	48,259
Percentage	6.61%	12.98%
Swing	▲2.07pp	▲2.57pp
- Popular vote by riding. As this is an FPTP election, seat totals are not determined by popular vote, but instead via results by each riding.
Premier before election
David Alward
Progressive Conservative
Premier after election
Brian Gallant
Liberal

The 2014 New Brunswick general election was held on September 22, 2014, to elect 49 members to the 58th New Brunswick Legislative Assembly, the governing house of the province of New Brunswick, Canada.

The 2013 redistribution reduced the size of the legislature from 55 seats to 49.

The New Brunswick Liberal Association, led by Brian Gallant, won a majority government, defeating Incumbent Premier David Alward's Progressive Conservatives, which became the second single-term government in New Brunswick's history. The New Democratic Party, led by Dominic Cardy won the highest support in its history, though failed to win any seats. As a result of these losses, both Alward and Cardy resigned as leaders of their respective parties. The Green Party of New Brunswick improved on its results from the previous election, with party leader David Coon winning the party's first seat, and becoming only the second Green politician (after British Columbia MLA Andrew J. Weaver) elected to a provincial legislature.

Fracking was a major issue in the election as a whole. Most commentators described the election as a referendum on it.

Polling in the weeks leading up to the campaign gave the Liberals a wide lead over the governing Progressive Conservatives. Some commentators openly speculated about whether the Liberals were on track to repeat the 1987 provincial election, when they won every seat in the Legislative Assembly. As the campaign progressed, however, the gap in popular support between the two parties narrowed significantly. Some attributed this in part to a television interview with CBC New Brunswick anchor Harry Forestell in which Gallant gave inaccurate numbers relating to his proposal for a tax increase on the province's wealthiest residents. In the final poll of the campaign, the Liberals and the Progressive Conservatives were tied at 40 per cent support each.

== Timeline ==
- September 27, 2010 – The Progressive Conservatives under David Alward win 42 of 55 seats. The Liberals are reduced to 13 seats and Shawn Graham announces that he will step down as leader.
- October 25, 2010 – NDP leader Roger Duguay resigns. He was replaced by interim leader Jesse Travis.
- November 9, 2010 – Liberal leader Shawn Graham resigns. He was replaced on an interim basis by Victor Boudreau and was permanently replaced by Brian Gallant in late 2012.
- March 2, 2011 – Dominic Cardy is acclaimed as the new leader of the NDP.
- September 12, 2011 – Green leader Jack Macdougall resigns. He was replaced by interim leader Greta Doucet.
- May 16, 2012 – Resignation of Margaret-Ann Blaney as MLA of Rothesay.
- June 25, 2012 – Ted Flemming is elected MLA for Rothesay, following the resignation of Margaret-Ann Blaney.
- September 20, 2012 - Jim Parrott is expelled from the PC caucus after making statements questioning linguistic duality in the healthcare system.
- September 22, 2012 - David Coon is elected new leader of the Green Party.
- October 27, 2012 - Brian Gallant is elected leader of the New Brunswick Liberal Party.
- March 11, 2013 - Shawn Graham resigns as member for Kent.
- April 15, 2013 – Brian Gallant is elected MLA for Kent, following the resignation of Shawn Graham.
- June 6, 2013 - New electoral districts are finalized and will take effect at this election.
- April 30, 2014 - Jim Parrott rejoins PC caucus.
- June 27, 2014 - PC MLA Bev Harrison announces he will seek re-election as a New Democrat, he leaves the PC caucus to sit as an independent.
- August 18, 2014 - Premier Alward meets with Lieutenant-Governor Graydon Nicholas who grants the premier's request to dissolve the legislature effective August 21, 2014 for a general election to be held September 22, 2014.
- August 21, 2014 - New Brunswick legislature dissolved by the lieutenant-governor.
- September 22, 2014 - general election.

== Results ==
Summary of the 2014 Legislative Assembly of New Brunswick election
Party	Leader	Candidates	Votes				Seats		
Party	Leader	Candidates	#	±	%	Change (pp)	2010	2014	±
Liberal	Brian Gallant	49	158,852	30,774▲	42.73	8.28	13	27 / 49	14▲
Progressive Conservative	David Alward	49	128,799	52,598▼	34.65	-14.15	42	21 / 49	21▼
New Democratic	Dominic Cardy	49	48,259	9,573▲	12.98	2.58			
Green	David Coon	46	24,572	7,629▲	6.61	2.05	–	1 / 49	1▲
People's Alliance	Kris Austin	18	7,964	3,601▲	2.14	0.97			
Independent		8	3,293	1,018▲	0.89	0.27			
Total		219	371,739		100.00%				
Rejected ballots			1,622	1,538▼					
Turnout			373,361	1,541▼	64.65%	4.91▼			
Registered voters			577,529	38,564▲					

=== Synopsis of results ===
2014 New Brunswick general election - synopsis of riding results
Riding	Winning party							Turnout	Votes						
Riding	2010	1st place	Votes	Share	Margin #	Margin %	2nd place	Turnout	Lib	PC	NDP	Green	PA	Ind	Total
Albert	PC	PC	3,163	40.78%	973	12.55%	Lib	62.20%	2,190	3,163	880	929	594	–	7,756
Bathurst East-Nepisiguit-Saint-Isidore	New	Lib	4,431	61.56%	2,537	35.25%	PC	63.71%	4,431	1,894	559	314	–	–	7,198
Bathurst West-Beresford	New	Lib	4,367	62.74%	2,589	37.19%	PC	62.79%	4,367	1,778	564	252	–	–	6,961
Campbellton-Dalhousie	New	Lib	4,820	62.25%	2,941	37.98%	PC	66.43%	4,820	1,879	762	282	–	–	7,743
Caraquet	Lib	Lib	4,716	56.82%	2,902	34.96%	PC	73.99%	4,716	1,814	1,579	191	–	–	8,300
Carleton	New	PC	4,061	56.77%	2,473	34.57%	Lib	62.63%	1,588	4,061	580	750	174	–	7,153
Carleton-Victoria	New	Lib	3,131	40.83%	82	1.07%	PC	64.14%	3,131	3,049	683	464	–	341	7,668
Carleton-York	New	PC	3,662	46.53%	1,459	18.54%	Lib	64.06%	2,203	3,662	816	602	587	–	7,870
Charlotte-Campobello	PC	Lib	3,176	41.73%	194	2.55%	PC	60.96%	3,176	2,982	515	453	484	–	7,610
Dieppe	Lib	Lib	4,866	65.97%	3,506	47.53%	PC	65.37%	4,866	1,360	736	414	–	–	7,376
Edmundston-Madawaska Centre	PC	PC	3,666	48.16%	243	3.19%	Lib	67.29%	3,423	3,666	523	–	–	–	7,612
Fredericton-Grand Lake	New	PC	2,403	28.79%	26	0.31%	PA	69.52%	2,330	2,403	879	358	2,377	–	8,347
Fredericton North	New	Lib	2,589	33.60%	144	1.87%	PC	66.14%	2,589	2,445	1,560	791	320	–	7,705
Fredericton South	New	Green	2,272	30.68%	334	4.51%	PC	67.89%	1,601	1,938	1,465	2,272	–	130	7,406
Fredericton West-Hanwell	New	PC	2,971	35.21%	469	5.56%	NDP	68.67%	2,384	2,971	2,502	582	–	–	8,439
Fredericton-York	New	PC	2,887	35.43%	522	6.41%	Lib	66.71%	2,365	2,887	1,695	583	379	240	8,149
Fundy-The Isles-Saint John West	Lib	Lib	4,498	62.47%	2,670	37.08%	PC	62.15%	4,498	1,828	558	316	–	–	7,200
Gagetown-Petitcodiac	New	PC	3,352	44.47%	853	11.32%	Lib	63.32%	2,499	3,352	978	709	–	–	7,538
Hampton	New	PC	2,679	38.74%	883	12.77%	NDP	58.47%	1,618	2,679	1,796	554	269	–	6,916
Kent North	New	Lib	4,699	50.02%	2,992	31.85%	Green	75.00%	4,699	1,559	1,294	1,707	135	–	9,394
Kent South	New	Lib	4,637	48.66%	1,421	14.91%	PC	76.07%	4,637	3,216	535	953	188	–	9,529
Kings Centre	New	PC	2,431	35.66%	321	4.71%	Lib	59.61%	2,110	2,431	1,642	311	–	323	6,817
Madawaska-les-Lacs-Edmundston	PC	Lib	4,106	56.39%	1,490	20.46%	PC	62.68%	4,106	2,616	560	–	–	–	7,282
Memramcook-Tantramar	PC	Lib	3,515	45.64%	1,478	19.19%	PC	65.57%	3,515	2,037	972	1,178	–	–	7,702
Miramichi	New	Lib	3,974	50.00%	1,231	15.49%	PC	70.29%	3,974	2,743	328	307	–	596	7,948
Miramichi Bay-Neguac	PC	Lib	4,199	49.22%	892	10.46%	PC	71.25%	4,199	3,307	785	240	–	–	8,531
Moncton Centre	New	Lib	3,339	52.98%	1,750	27.77%	PC	58.13%	3,339	1,589	866	508	–	–	6,302
Moncton East	New	Lib	3,443	45.09%	922	12.07%	PC	62.23%	3,443	2,521	1,105	567	–	–	7,636
Moncton Northwest	PC	PC	3,012	42.15%	239	3.34%	Lib	59.11%	2,773	3,012	783	436	142	–	7,146
Moncton South	PC	Lib	2,903	45.10%	656	10.19%	PC	54.70%	2,903	2,247	757	530	–	–	6,437
Moncton Southwest	New	PC	2,523	38.80%	249	3.83%	Lib	54.38%	2,274	2,523	1,129	392	184	–	6,502
New Maryland-Sunbury	PC	PC	3,391	40.95%	796	9.61%	Lib	65.96%	2,595	3,391	1,787	508	–	–	8,281
Oromocto-Lincoln	New	PC	2,827	41.97%	473	7.02%	Lib	59.07%	2,354	2,827	857	379	318	–	6,735
Portland-Simonds	PC	PC	2,782	48.90%	877	15.42%	Lib	50.83%	1,905	2,782	743	259	–	–	5,689
Quispamsis	PC	PC	3,884	51.35%	1,494	19.75%	Lib	64.19%	2,390	3,884	938	238	114	–	7,564
Restigouche-Chaleur	Lib	Lib	4,069	53.92%	1,871	24.79%	NDP	66.23%	4,069	1,120	2,198	160	–	–	7,547
Restigouche West	New	Lib	4,940	58.02%	3,230	37.93%	PC	72.11%	4,940	1,710	351	–	–	1,514	8,515
Riverview	PC	PC	3,751	52.73%	1,654	23.25%	Lib	61.18%	2,097	3,751	723	542	–	–	7,113
Rothesay	PC	PC	3,034	45.20%	1,196	17.82%	Lib	60.87%	1,838	3,034	1,559	282	–	–	6,713
Saint John East	New	Lib	2,332	37.02%	9	0.14%	PC	54.92%	2,332	2,323	1,167	353	124	–	6,299
Saint John Harbour	Lib	Lib	1,686	32.19%	71	1.36%	PC	46.78%	1,686	1,615	1,120	701	115	–	5,237
Saint John Lancaster	PC	PC	2,619	39.18%	457	6.84%	Lib	62.09%	2,162	2,619	1,535	283	–	85	6,684
Shediac Bay-Dieppe	New	Lib	5,661	64.61%	3,983	45.46%	PC	68.63%	5,661	1,678	803	620	–	–	8,762
Shediac-Beaubassin-Cap-Pelé	Lib	Lib	5,496	60.18%	3,778	41.37%	PC	72.21%	5,496	1,718	1,175	743	–	–	9,132
Shippagan-Lamèque-Miscou	PC	Lib	4,014	46.10%	44	0.51%	PC	76.65%	4,014	3,970	497	226	–	–	8,707
Southwest Miramichi-Bay du Vin	PC	PC	3,837	47.62%	886	11.00%	Lib	70.23%	2,951	3,837	361	214	694	–	8,057
Sussex-Fundy-St. Martins	PC	PC	3,677	49.86%	1,967	26.67%	Lib	61.05%	1,710	3,677	652	570	766	–	7,375
Tracadie-Sheila	PC	Lib	5,916	64.61%	3,721	40.64%	PC	76.60%	5,916	2,195	861	121	–	64	9,157
Victoria-la-Vallée	PC	Lib	3,969	49.62%	913	11.41%	PC	68.72%	3,969	3,056	546	428	–	–	7,999

= Open seat
= Turnout is above provincial average
= Winning candidate was in previous Legislature
= Incumbent had switched allegiance
= Previously incumbent in another riding
= Not incumbent; was previously elected to the Legislature
= Incumbency arose from byelection gain
= Other incumbents renominated
= Previously an MP in the House of Commons of Canada
= Multiple candidates

=== Tabulator problem and manual recount demand ===
The election marked the first time that the province used electronic vote tabulation machines from Dominion Voting in a provincial election. They had previously been used in New Brunswick municipal elections. On election night, the machines displayed vote totals which were verified by Elections New Brunswick officials and entered into a province-wide database for the media. By 11:45 PM, these unverified numbers were to have been replaced by totally machine-reported numbers from the tabulators themselves with no human interventions or errors possible to distort results. It was "a program processing the initial results that had a glitch", not the tabulators themselves, according to officials.

Elections New Brunswick grew uncomfortable with the human involvement and influence of the unevenly tabulated results. It brought the results reporting to a standstill as counts were reverified by hand before further resignations or concessions were triggered.

At 10:45 p.m. Atlantic time, Elections New Brunswick officially suspended the results reporting count, with 17 ridings still undeclared, while it investigated the delay. It called for over sixty tabulator count devices to be brought to central locations for verification without relying on the reporting program. At no time was there an allegation of fraud by any party or public official.

As a result of the controversy, both the Progressive Conservatives and the People's Alliance Party called for a hand count of all ballots, with the former refusing to concede the election until the following day. Michael Quinn, the province's chief electoral officer determined no total recount was necessary. Recounts were held in 7 of 49 ridings and the results were upheld with variations of no more than 1 vote per candidate per riding.

=== Results by region ===
Party Name		Northern	Miramichi	Southeastern	Southern	Capital Region	Upper River Valley	Total
Liberal	Seats	8	2	9	4	1	3	27
Liberal	Popular Vote	58.12%	45.34%	46.52%	34.30%	29.27%	43.00%	42.72%
Progressive; Conservative	Seats	0	1	5	7	6	2	21
Progressive; Conservative	Popular Vote	25.51%	40.30%	31.13%	40.29%	35.79%	43.61%	34.65%
New Democratic	Seats	0	0	0	0	0	0	0
New Democratic	Popular Vote	11.49%	6.01%	11.76%	16.50%	18.37%	7.67%	12.98%
Green	Seats	0	0	0	0	1	0	1
Green	Popular Vote	2.42%	3.10%	9.44%	5.83%	9.65%	4.35%	6.61%
People's Alliance	Seats	0	0	0	0	0	0	0
People's Alliance	Popular Vote	0.00%	2.83%	1.15%	2.53%	6.33%	0.46%	2.14%
Independent	Seats	0	0	0	0	0	0	0
Independent	Popular Vote	2.46%	2.43%	0.00%	0.55%	0.59%	0.90%	0.89%
Total seats		8	3	14	11	8	5	49

=== Results by place ===
Candidates ranked 1st to 5th place, by party
Parties	1st	2nd	3rd	4th	5th
█ Liberal	27	18	4		
█ Progressive Conservative	21	26	2		
█ Green	1	1	4	34	6
█ New Democratic		3	35	11	
█ People's Alliance		1	2	1	14
█ Independent			2	1	4

== Opinion polls ==
Polling Firm	Last Day of Polling	Link	PC	Liberal	NDP	Green	PA
Forum Research	September 21, 2014	PDF	40	40	12	6	
Corporate Research Associates	September 18, 2014	HTML	36	45	11	6	2
Forum Research	September 11, 2014	PDF	32	42	13	6	
Corporate Research Associates	August 31, 2014	HTML	28	48	17	4	2
Forum Research	August 25, 2014	HTML	31	46	15	7	
Nordic Research Group	August 21, 2014	HTML	26	34	13	5	
Corporate Research Associates	May 31, 2014	HTML	28	53	16	3	
Corporate Research Associates	February 28, 2014	PDF	31	43	21	4	
Corporate Research Associates	November 28, 2013	HTML	25	47	24	4	
Corporate Research Associates	September 1, 2013	PDF	23	47	24	4	3
Corporate Research Associates	May 30, 2013	PDF	29	41	27	3	1
Corporate Research Associates	March 8, 2013	PDF	32	35	26	5	
Corporate Research Associates	December 1, 2012	PDF	38	38	19	4	1
Corporate Research Associates	August 31, 2012	PDF	38	32	24	6	
Corporate Research Associates	May 30, 2012	PDF	44	32	19	5	
Corporate Research Associates	February 29, 2012	PDF	45	31	22	3	
Corporate Research Associates	November 29, 2011	PDF	45	28	23	3	1
Corporate Research Associates	August 31, 2011	PDF	41	34	23		2
Corporate Research Associates	May 31, 2011	PDF	56	20	20	1	3
Corporate Research Associates	February 28, 2011	PDF	58	27	8	6	
Corporate Research Associates	November 30, 2010	PDF	61	25	10	4	
Election 2010	September 27, 2010	HTML	48.8	34.5	10.4	4.6	1.2

== Retiring incumbents ==
The following sitting members of the legislative assembly (MLAs) had announced that they would not re-offer at this election:

=== Progressive Conservatives ===
- John Betts, MLA for Moncton Crescent (1999–2014)
- Jack Carr, MLA for New Maryland-Sunbury West (2008–2014)
- Greg Davis, MLA for Campbellton-Restigouche Centre (2010–2014)
- Dale Graham, MLA for Carleton (1995–2014) and Carleton North (1993–1995)
- Wes McLean, MLA for Victoria-Tobique (2010–2014)
- Wayne Steeves, MLA for Albert (1999–2014)
- Glen Tait, MLA for Saint John East (2010–2014)

=== Liberals ===
- Roland Haché, MLA for Nigadoo-Chaleur (1999–2014)

== Candidates ==
New boundaries were in effect as a result of an electoral redistribution replacing the districts used in the 2006 and 2010 elections. Candidates had to file their nomination papers by September 2, 2014 to appear on the ballot.

Legend

- **bold** denotes cabinet minister or party leader
- italics denotes a potential candidate who has not received his/her party's nomination
- † denotes an incumbent who is not running for re-election
- * denotes an incumbent seeking re-election in a new district

=== Northern ===
Electoral district	Candidates					Incumbent
Electoral district	Progressive Conservatives	Liberal	NDP	Green	Other	Incumbent
Restigouche West	Martine Coulombe*; 1,710; 20.08%	Gilles LePage; 4,940; 58.02%	Gilles Cyr; 351; 4.12%	—	Charles Thériault (Independent); 1,514; 17.78%	new district
Campbellton-Dalhousie	Joseph Elias; 1,879; 24.27%	Donald Arseneault; 4,820; 62.25%	Jamie O'Rourke; 762; 9.84%	Heather Wood; 282; 3.64%		Donald Arseneault
Campbellton-Dalhousie	Joseph Elias; 1,879; 24.27%	Donald Arseneault; 4,820; 62.25%	Jamie O'Rourke; 762; 9.84%	Heather Wood; 282; 3.64%		merged district
Campbellton-Dalhousie	Joseph Elias; 1,879; 24.27%	Donald Arseneault; 4,820; 62.25%	Jamie O'Rourke; 762; 9.84%	Heather Wood; 282; 3.64%		Greg Davis†
Restigouche-Chaleur	Gilberte Boudreau; 1,120; 14.84%	Daniel Guitard; 4,069; 53.92%	Ray Godin; 2,198; 29.12%	Mario Comeau; 160; 2.12%		Roland Haché†
Bathurst West-Beresford	Anne Bard-Lavigne; 1,778; 25.54%	Brian Kenny*; 4,367; 62.74%	Etienne Arseneau; 564; 8.10%	Catherine Doucet; 252; 3.62%		new district
Bathurst East-Nepisiguit-Saint-Isidore	Ryan Riordon*; 1,894; 26.31%	Denis Landry*; 4,431; 61.56%	Benjamin Kalenda; 559; 7.77%	Gerry Aubie; 314; 4.36%		new district
Caraquet	Suzanne Morais-Vienneau; 1,814; 21.86%	Hédard Albert; 4,716; 56.82%	Mathieu Chayer; 1,579; 19.02%	Sophie Chiasson-Gould; 191; 2.30%		Hédard Albert
Shippagan-Lamèque-Miscou	Paul Robichaud; 3,970; 45.60%	Wilfred Roussel; 4,014; 46.10%	Juliette Paulin; 497; 5.71%	Tony Mallet; 226; 2.60%		**Paul Robichaud**
Tracadie-Sheila	Claude Landry; 2,195; 23.97%	Serge Rousselle; 5,916; 64.61%	François Rousselle; 861; 9.40%	Nancy Benoit; 121; 1.32%	Donald Thomas (Independent); 64; 0.70%	Claude Landry

=== Miramichi ===
Electoral district	Candidates					Incumbent
Electoral district	Progressive Conservatives	Liberal	NDP	Green	Other	Incumbent
Miramichi Bay-Neguac	Serge Robichaud; 3,307; 38.76%	Lisa Harris; 4,199; 49.22%	Curtis Bartibogue; 785; 9.20%	Filip Vanicek; 240; 2.81%		Serge Robichaud
Miramichi	**Robert Trevors**; 2,743; 34.51%	Bill Fraser; 3,974; 50.00%	Roger Vautour; 328; 4.13%	Patty Deitch; 307; 3.86%	Michael "Tanker" Malley (Independent); 596; 7.50%	Bill Fraser
Miramichi	**Robert Trevors**; 2,743; 34.51%	Bill Fraser; 3,974; 50.00%	Roger Vautour; 328; 4.13%	Patty Deitch; 307; 3.86%	Michael "Tanker" Malley (Independent); 596; 7.50%	merged district
Miramichi	**Robert Trevors**; 2,743; 34.51%	Bill Fraser; 3,974; 50.00%	Roger Vautour; 328; 4.13%	Patty Deitch; 307; 3.86%	Michael "Tanker" Malley (Independent); 596; 7.50%	**Robert Trevors**
Southwest Miramichi-Bay du Vin	Jake Stewart; 3,837; 47.62%	Norma Smith; 2,951; 36.63%	Douglas Mullin; 361; 4.48%	Kevin Matthews; 214; 2.66%	Wes Gullison (PANB); 694; 8.61%	Jake Stewart

=== Southeastern ===
Electoral district	Candidates					Incumbent
Electoral district	Progressive Conservatives	Liberal	NDP	Green	Other	Incumbent
Kent North	Nancy Blanchard; 1,559; 16.60%	Bertrand LeBlanc; 4,699; 50.02%	Allan Marsh; 1,294; 13.77%	Rébeka Frazer-Chiasson; 1,707; 18.17%	Raven-Chanelle Arsenault-Augustine (PANB); 135; 1.44%	Bertrand LeBlanc
Kent South	**Claude Williams**; 3,216; 33.75%	Benoît Bourque; 4,637; 48.66%	Paul Musgrave; 535; 5.61%	Tina Beers; 953; 10.00%	Joël MacIntosh (PANB); 188; 1.97%	**Brian Gallant**^{[A]}
Kent South	**Claude Williams**; 3,216; 33.75%	Benoît Bourque; 4,637; 48.66%	Paul Musgrave; 535; 5.61%	Tina Beers; 953; 10.00%	Joël MacIntosh (PANB); 188; 1.97%	merged district
Kent South	**Claude Williams**; 3,216; 33.75%	Benoît Bourque; 4,637; 48.66%	Paul Musgrave; 535; 5.61%	Tina Beers; 953; 10.00%	Joël MacIntosh (PANB); 188; 1.97%	**Claude Williams**
Shediac Bay-Dieppe	Dolorès Poirier; 1,678; 19.15%	**Brian Gallant***; 5,661; 64.61%	Agathe Lapointe; 803; 9.16%	Stephanie Matthews; 620; 7.08%		new district
Shediac-Beaubassin-Cap-Pelé	Carmel Brun; 1,718; 18.81%	Victor Boudreau; 5,496; 60.18%	Bernice Boudreau; 1,175; 12.87%	Charles Thibodeau; 743; 8.14%		Victor Boudreau
Memramcook-Tantramar	**Mike Olscamp**; 2,037; 26.45%	Bernard LeBlanc*; 3,515; 45.64%	Hélène Boudreau; 972; 12.62%	Megan Mitton; 1,178; 15.29%		**Mike Olscamp**
Dieppe	Normand Léger; 1,360; 18.44%	Roger Melanson; 4,866; 65.97%	Sandy Harquail; 736; 9.98%	Françoise Aubin; 414; 5.61%		Roger Melanson
Moncton East	Jane Mitton-MacLean; 2,521; 33.01%	Monique LeBlanc; 3,443; 45.09%	Roy MacMullin; 1,105; 14.47%	Matthew Clark; 567; 7.43%		new district
Moncton Centre	**Marie-Claude Blais***; 1,589; 25.21%	Chris Collins*; 3,339; 52.98%	Luc Leblanc; 866; 13.74%	Jeffrey McCluskey; 508; 8.06%		new district
Moncton South	**Sue Stultz**; 2,247; 34.91%	Cathy Rogers; 2,903; 45.10%	Elisabeth French; 757; 11.76%	Rish McGlynn; 530; 8.23%		**Sue Stultz**
Moncton Northwest	Ernie Steeves; 3,012; 42.15%	Brian Hicks; 2,773; 38.80%	Jason Purdy; 783; 10.96%	Mike Milligan; 436; 6.10%	Carl Bainbridge (PANB); 142; 1.99%	John Betts†
Moncton Southwest	Sherry Wilson*; 2,523; 38.80%	Tyson Milner; 2,274; 34.97%	Charles Doucet; 1,129; 17.36%	Mathieu LaPlante; 392; 6.03%	Lucy Goguen (PANB); 184; 2.83%	new district
Riverview	**Bruce Fitch**; 3,751; 52.73%	Tammy Rampersaud; 2,097; 29.48%	Danie Pitre; 723; 10.16%	Linda Hardwick; 542; 7.62%		**Bruce Fitch**
Albert	Brian Keirstead; 3,163; 40.78%	Terry Keating; 2,190; 28.24%	Kelly-Sue O'Connor; 880; 11.35%	Ira Wilbur; 929; 11.98%	Bill Brewer (PANB); 594; 7.66%	Wayne Steeves†
Gagetown-Petitcodiac	Ross Wetmore*; 3,352; 44.47%	Barak Stevens; 2,499; 33.15%	Anthony Crandall; 978; 12.97%	Fred Harrison; 709; 9.41%		new district

=== Southern ===
Electoral district	Candidates					Incumbent
Electoral district	Progressive Conservatives	Liberal	NDP	Green	Other	Incumbent
Sussex-Fundy-St. Martins	**Bruce Northrup**; 3,677; 49.86%	Heike MacGregor; 1,710; 23.19%	Billy Carter; 652; 8.84%	Stephanie Coburn; 570; 7.73%	LeRoy Armstrong (PANB); 766; 10.39%	**Bruce Northrup**
Hampton	Gary Crossman; 2,679; 38.74%	John Cairns; 1,618; 23.40%	Bev Harrison*; 1,796; 25.97%	John Sabine; 554; 8.01%	Joan K. Seeley (PANB); 269; 3.89%	new district
Quispamsis	**Blaine Higgs**; 3,884; 51.35%	Mary Schryer; 2,390; 31.60%	Angela-Jo Griffin; 938; 12.40%	Patrick Kemp; 238; 3.15%	Brandon Gardner (PANB); 114; 1.51%	**Blaine Higgs**
Rothesay	**Ted Flemming**; 3,039; 45.24%	Stephanie Tomilson; 1,838; 27.36%	John Wilcox; 1,559; 23.21%	Ann McAllister; 282; 4.20%		**Ted Flemming**^{[B]}
Saint John East	Glen Savoie; 2,323; 36.88%	Gary Keating; 2,332; 37.02%	Phil Comeau; 1,167; 18.53%	Sharon Murphy; 353; 5.60%	Jason Inness (PANB); 124; 1.97%	Glen Savoie
Saint John East	Glen Savoie; 2,323; 36.88%	Gary Keating; 2,332; 37.02%	Phil Comeau; 1,167; 18.53%	Sharon Murphy; 353; 5.60%	Jason Inness (PANB); 124; 1.97%	merged district
Saint John East	Glen Savoie; 2,323; 36.88%	Gary Keating; 2,332; 37.02%	Phil Comeau; 1,167; 18.53%	Sharon Murphy; 353; 5.60%	Jason Inness (PANB); 124; 1.97%	Glen Tait†
Portland-Simonds	**Trevor Holder**; 2,782; 48.90%	Michael Butler; 1,905; 33.49%	Tony Sekulich; 743; 13.06%	Sheila Croteau; 259; 4.55%		**Trevor Holder**
Saint John Harbour	Carl Killen; 1,615; 30.84%	Ed Doherty; 1,686; 32.19%	Gary Stackhouse; 1,120; 21.39%	Wayne Dryer; 701; 13.39%	Arthur Watson (PANB); 115; 2.20%	Carl Killen
Saint John Lancaster	**Dorothy Shephard**; 2,619; 39.18%	Peter McGuire; 2,162; 32.35%	Abel LeBlanc; 1,535; 22.97%	Ashley Durdle; 283; 4.23%	Mary Ellen Carpenter (Independent); 85; 1.27%	**Dorothy Shephard**
Kings Centre	Bill Oliver; 2,431; 35.66%	Shannon Merrifield; 2,110; 30.95%	Daniel Anderson; 1,642; 24.09%	Mark Connell; 311; 4.56%	Colby Fraser (Independent); 323; 4.74%	new district
Fundy-The Isles-Saint John West	Jim Parrott*; 1,828; 25.39%	Rick Doucet; 4,498; 62.47%	Terry James; 558; 7.75%	Krysta Oland; 316; 4.39%		Rick Doucet
Charlotte-Campobello	Curtis Malloch; 2,982; 39.19%	John Ames; 3,176; 41.73%	June Greenlaw; 515; 6.77%	Derek Simon; 453; 5.95%	Joyce Wright (PANB); 484; 6.36%	Curtis Malloch

=== Capital Region ===
Electoral district	Candidates					Incumbent
Electoral district	Progressive Conservatives	Liberal	NDP	Green	Other	Incumbent
Oromocto-Lincoln	**Jody Carr**; 2,827; 41.97%	Trisha Hoyt; 2,354; 34.95%	Amanda Diggins; 857; 12.72%	Jean Louis Deveau; 379; 5.63%	Jeff Langille (PANB); 318; 4.72%	**Jody Carr**
Oromocto-Lincoln	**Jody Carr**; 2,827; 41.97%	Trisha Hoyt; 2,354; 34.95%	Amanda Diggins; 857; 12.72%	Jean Louis Deveau; 379; 5.63%	Jeff Langille (PANB); 318; 4.72%	merged district
Oromocto-Lincoln	**Jody Carr**; 2,827; 41.97%	Trisha Hoyt; 2,354; 34.95%	Amanda Diggins; 857; 12.72%	Jean Louis Deveau; 379; 5.63%	Jeff Langille (PANB); 318; 4.72%	**Craig Leonard**
Fredericton-Grand Lake	Pam Lynch; 2,403; 28.79%	Sheri Shannon; 2,330; 27.91%	Bronwen Mosher; 879; 10.53%	Dan Weston; 358; 4.29%	**Kris Austin**(PANB); 2,377; 28.48%	Pam Lynch
Fredericton-Grand Lake	Pam Lynch; 2,403; 28.79%	Sheri Shannon; 2,330; 27.91%	Bronwen Mosher; 879; 10.53%	Dan Weston; 358; 4.29%	**Kris Austin**(PANB); 2,377; 28.48%	merged district
Fredericton-Grand Lake	Pam Lynch; 2,403; 28.79%	Sheri Shannon; 2,330; 27.91%	Bronwen Mosher; 879; 10.53%	Dan Weston; 358; 4.29%	**Kris Austin**(PANB); 2,377; 28.48%	Ross Wetmore
New Maryland-Sunbury	Jeff Carr; 3,391; 40.95%	Michael Pearson; 2,595; 31.34%	Aimee Foreman; 1,787; 21.58%	Kelsey Adams; 508; 6.13%		Jack Carr†
Fredericton South	**Craig Leonard***; 1,938; 26.17%	Roy Wiggins; 1,601; 21.62%	Kelly Lamrock; 1,465; 19.78%	**David Coon**; 2,272; 30.68%	Courtney Mills (Independent); 130; 1.76%	new district
Fredericton North	**Troy Lifford***; 2,445; 31.73%	Stephen Horsman; 2,589; 33.60%	Brian Duplessis; 1,560; 20.25%	Madeleine Berrevoets; 791; 10.27%	Patricia Wilkins (PANB); 320; 4.15%	new district
Fredericton-York	Kirk MacDonald*; 2,886; 35.42%	Randy McKeen; 2,365; 29.03%	Sharon Scott-Levesque; 1,695; 20.80%	Dorothy Diamond; 583; 7.16%	Rick Wilkins (PANB); 379; 4.65% Gerald Bourque (Independent); 240; 2.95%	new district
Fredericton West-Hanwell	Brian Macdonald; 2,971; 35.21%	Bernadine Gibson; 2,384; 28.25%	**Dominic Cardy**; 2,502; 29.65%	Gayla MacIntosh; 582; 6.90%		Brian Macdonald
Fredericton West-Hanwell	Brian Macdonald; 2,971; 35.21%	Bernadine Gibson; 2,384; 28.25%	**Dominic Cardy**; 2,502; 29.65%	Gayla MacIntosh; 582; 6.90%		merged district
Fredericton West-Hanwell	Brian Macdonald; 2,971; 35.21%	Bernadine Gibson; 2,384; 28.25%	**Dominic Cardy**; 2,502; 29.65%	Gayla MacIntosh; 582; 6.90%		Carl Urquhart
Carleton-York	Carl Urquhart*; 3,662; 46.53%	Ashley Cummings; 2,203; 27.99%	Jacob Elsinga; 816; 10.37%	Terry Wishart; 602; 7.65%	David Graham (PANB); 587; 7.46%	new district

=== Upper River Valley ===
Electoral district	Candidates					Incumbent
Electoral district	Progressive Conservatives	Liberal	NDP	Green	Other	Incumbent
Carleton	**David Alward***; 4,061; 56.77%	Thomas Reid; 1,588; 22.20%	Jeremiah Clark; 580; 8.11%	Andrew Clark; 750; 10.49%	Steven Love (PANB); 174; 2.43%	new district
Carleton-Victoria	Colin Lockhart; 3,049; 39.76%	Andrew Harvey; 3,131; 40.83%	Joe Gee; 683; 8.91%	Garth Farquhar; 464; 6.05%	Carter Edgar (Independent); 216; 2.82% Terry Ritchie (Independent); 125; 1.63%	Dale Graham†
Carleton-Victoria	Colin Lockhart; 3,049; 39.76%	Andrew Harvey; 3,131; 40.83%	Joe Gee; 683; 8.91%	Garth Farquhar; 464; 6.05%	Carter Edgar (Independent); 216; 2.82% Terry Ritchie (Independent); 125; 1.63%	merged district
Carleton-Victoria	Colin Lockhart; 3,049; 39.76%	Andrew Harvey; 3,131; 40.83%	Joe Gee; 683; 8.91%	Garth Farquhar; 464; 6.05%	Carter Edgar (Independent); 216; 2.82% Terry Ritchie (Independent); 125; 1.63%	Wes McLean†
Victoria-la-Vallée	**Danny Soucy**; 3,056; 38.20%	Chuck Chiasson; 3,969; 49.62%	Joe Berube; 546; 6.83%	Daniel Zolondek; 428; 5.35%		**Danny Soucy**
Edmundston-Madawaska Centre	**Madeleine Dubé**; 3,666; 48.16%	Michel LeBlond; 3,423; 44.97%	Alain Martel; 523; 6.87%			**Madeleine Dubé**
Madawaska-les-Lacs-Edmundston	Yvon Bonenfant; 2,616; 35.92%	Francine Landry; 4,106; 56.39%	Widler Jules; 560; 7.69%			Yvon Bonenfant

== Notes ==
- A^{1} Gallant won the seat in a by-election on April 15, 2013. The seat was previously held by Liberal former premier Shawn Graham.
- B^{1} Flemming won the seat in a by-election on June 25, 2012. The seat was previously held by Progressive Conservative Margaret-Ann Blaney.
