= Fredericton-Lincoln =

Provincial electoral district in New Brunswick, Canada

Fredericton Lincoln
New Brunswick electoral district
- The riding of Fredericton Lincoln (as it exists from 2023) in relation to other New Brunswick electoral districts

Provincial electoral district
- Legislature: Legislative Assembly of New Brunswick
MLA
David Coon
Green
- District created: 2023
- First contested: 2024

Demographics
- Census subdivision(s): Fredericton, Oromocto

Fredericton-Lincoln is a provincial electoral district for the Legislative Assembly of New Brunswick, Canada. It was first created in the 2006 redrawing of electoral districts and was first used in the general election later that year. Its last Member of the Legislative Assembly (MLA) was Craig Leonard who served in the cabinet as Minister of Government Services.

== History ==
The district was created in the 2006 redistribution primarily from those parts of Fredericton-Fort Nashwaak south of the Saint John River and the suburban community of Lincoln from the New Maryland district. It also includes those portions of downtown Fredericton east of Regent Street that were not already a part of Fredericton-Fort Nashwaak (including the legislature building itself) which were formerly part of Fredericton South.

Its first representative is Liberal Greg Byrne, who previously represented the old Fredericton-Fort Nashwaak district from 1995 to 1999. One of Byrne's challengers in 2006 was then leader of the New Brunswick New Democratic Party Allison Brewer.

Following the 2023 redistribution, the riding will be re-created out of parts of Fredericton South, Oromocto-Lincoln-Fredericton, New Maryland-Sunbury and a small part of Fredericton West-Hanwell.

Fredericton-Lincoln (2006-2013)
New Brunswick electoral district
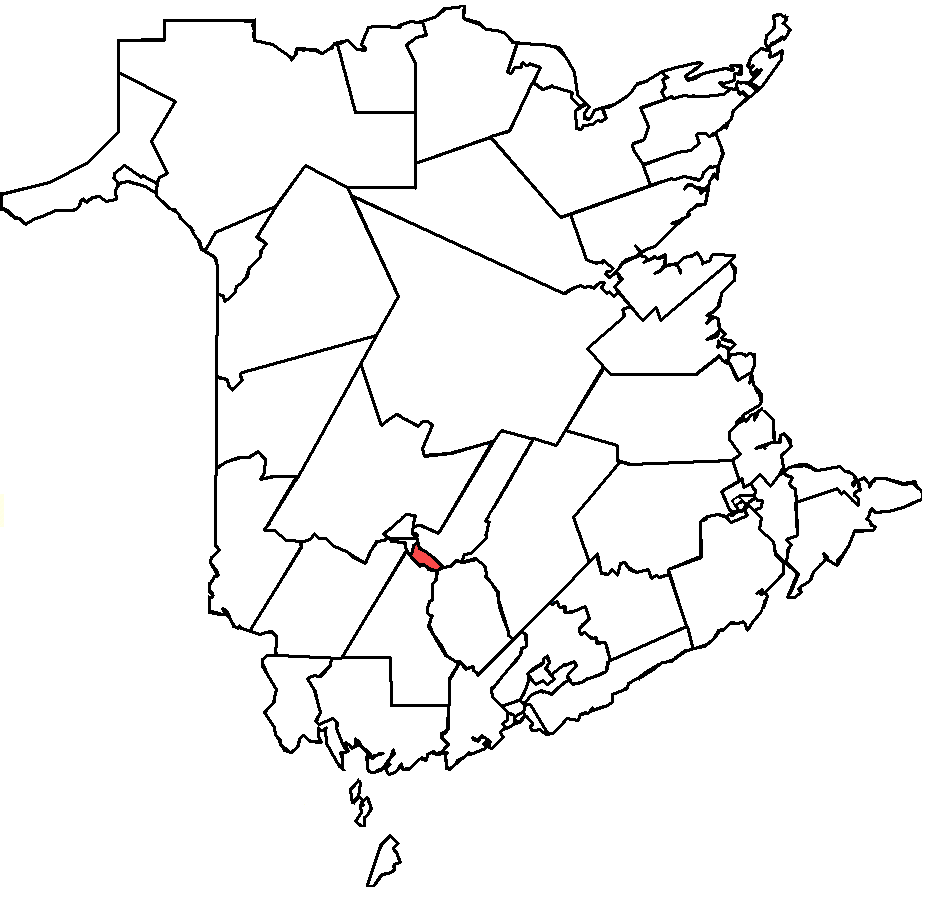
- Coordinates: 45.915°N 66.600°W

Defunct provincial electoral district
- Legislature: Legislative Assembly of New Brunswick
- District created: 2006
- District abolished: 2013
- First contested: 2006
- Last contested: 2010

Demographics
- Population (2001): 13,816
- Electors: 10,860
- Census division(s): York County, Sunbury County
- Census subdivision(s): City of Fredericton, Parish of Lincoln

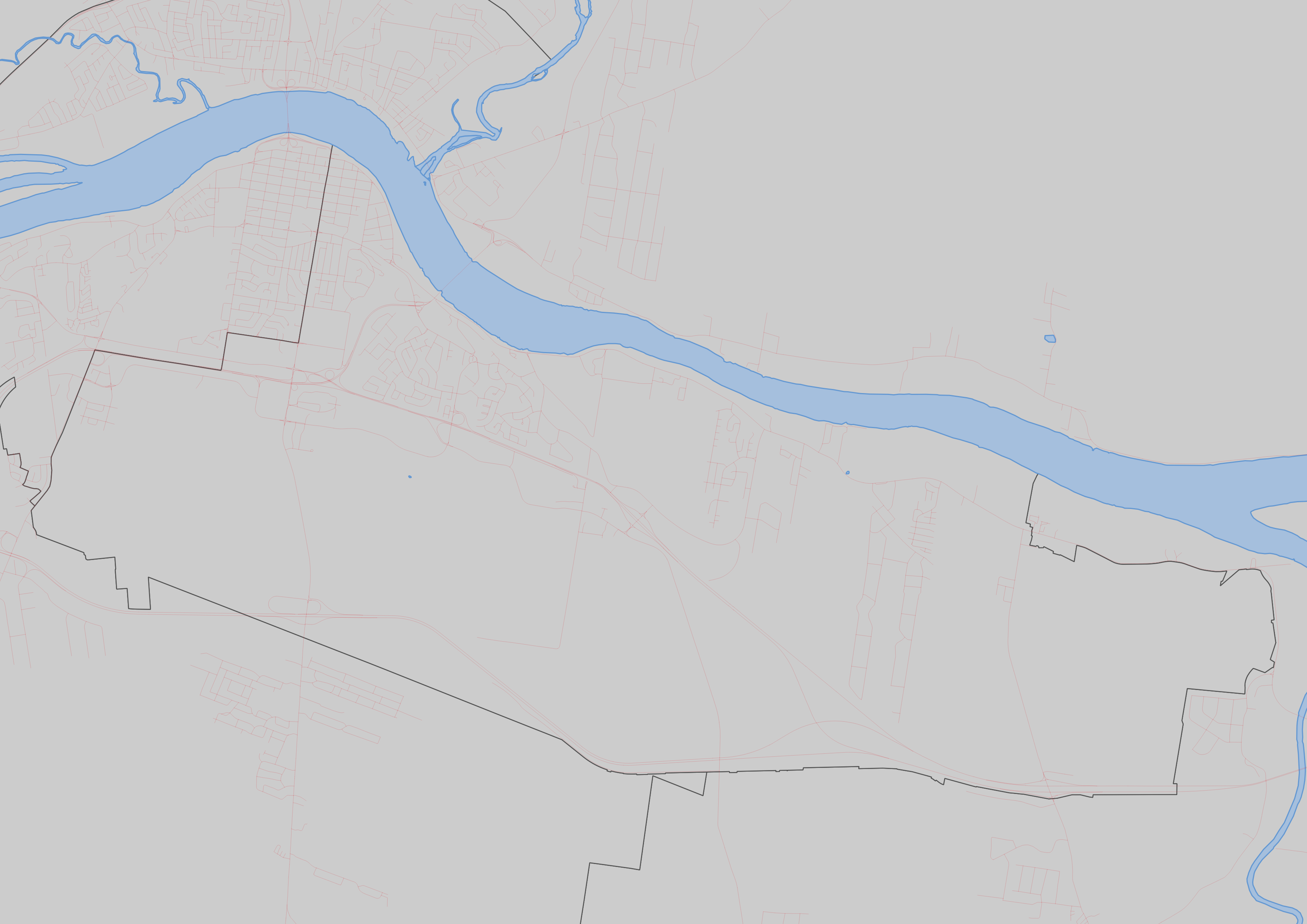
Fredericton Lincoln (as it exists from 2023) and the roads in the riding

== Members of the Legislative Assembly ==
Assembly	Years	Member	Party
Riding created from Fredericton-Fort Nashwaak (1995–2006), Fredericton South and New Maryland
56th	2006–2010	Greg Byrne	Liberal
57th	2010–2014	Craig Leonard	Progressive Conservative
Riding dissolved into Oromocto-Lincoln, Fredericton South and New Maryland-Sunbury
Riding recreated from Oromocto-Lincoln-Fredericton, Fredericton South, Fredericton West-Hanwell and New Maryland-Sunbury
61st	2024–Present	David Coon	Green

== Election results ==
=== 2024–present ===
2024 New Brunswick general election
Party	Candidate	Votes	%	±%
Green	David Coon	3,646	44.5%	+11.0
Progressive Conservative	Daniel Chippin	2,307	28.1%	-8.8
Liberal	Joni Leger	2,244	27.4%	+5.6
Total valid votes		8,197		
Total rejected ballots				
Turnout				
Eligible voters				
Green notional gain from Progressive Conservative		Swing		+9.9
Source: Elections New Brunswick

2020 provincial election redistributed results
Party	%
Progressive Conservative	36.9
Green	33.5
Liberal	21.8
People's Alliance	6.4
New Democratic	1.4

=== 2006–2014 ===
2010 New Brunswick general election
Party	Candidate	Votes	%	±%
Progressive Conservative	Craig Leonard	2,713	39.60	+3.73
Liberal	Greg Byrne	2,464	35.97	-12.68
New Democratic	Jason Purdy	1,009	14.73	-0.75
Green	Tracey Waite	665	9.71	–
Total valid votes		6,851	100.0	
Total rejected ballots		40	0.58	
Turnout		6,891	64.97	
Eligible voters		10,606		
Progressive Conservative gain from Liberal		Swing		+8.20
Source: Elections New Brunswick

2006 New Brunswick general election
Party	Candidate	Votes	%	±%
Liberal	Greg Byrne	3,272	48.65	
Progressive Conservative	William Forrestall	2,412	35.87	
New Democratic	Allison Brewer	1,041	15.48	
Total valid votes		6,725	100.0	
Liberal notional gain		Swing		
Source: Elections New Brunswick

* This was a new district being contested for the first time, being made up in parts from the former districts of Fredericton-Fort Nashwaak, Fredericton South and New Maryland. The latter two were previously held by the Progressive Conservatives while Fredericton-Fort Nashwaak had been held by the Liberals.

== See also ==
- List of New Brunswick provincial electoral districts
- Canadian provincial electoral districts
