= Fredericton South (electoral district) =

Provincial electoral district in New Brunswick, Canada

New Brunswick electoral district
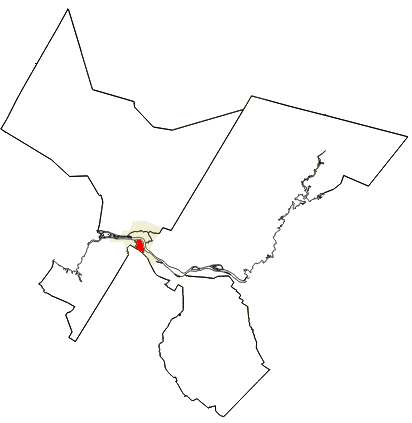
- The riding of Fredericton South in relation to other Fredericton electoral districts. The riding is red, other parts of the city of Fredericton are gold.
- Coordinates: 45.953°N 66.647°W

Defunct provincial electoral district
- Legislature: Legislative Assembly of New Brunswick
- District created: 2013
- First contested: 2014
- Last contested: 2020

Demographics
- Population (2011): 15,380
- Electors (2013): 11,178
- Census division: York
- Census subdivision: Fredericton

Fredericton South (French: Fredericton-Sud) was a provincial electoral district for the Legislative Assembly of New Brunswick, Canada. It was first contested in the 2014 general election, having been created in the 2013 redistribution of electoral boundaries by combining portions of the former districts of Fredericton-Lincoln and Fredericton-Silverwood.

The district included the downtown and uptown areas of the southside of the City of Fredericton, including Fredericton City Hall, the Legislative Assembly of New Brunswick, the University of New Brunswick and Saint Thomas University.

Green Party leader David Coon was elected MLA in 2014 and re-elected in 2018 and 2020.

== Members of the Legislative Assembly ==
| Assembly | Years | Member | Party |
|---|---|---|---|
Riding created from Fredericton-Silverwood and Fredericton-Lincoln
| 58th | 2014–2018 | David Coon | Green |
| 59th | 2018–2020 | David Coon | Green |
| 60th | 2020–2024 | David Coon | Green |
Riding abolished into Fredericton-Lincoln and Fredericton South-Silverwood

== Election results ==
2020 New Brunswick general election
| Party | Candidate | Votes | % | ±% |
|---|---|---|---|---|
| Green | David Coon | 4,213 | 54.01 | -2.70 |
| Progressive Conservative | Brian MacKinnon | 2,342 | 30.02 | +16.71 |
| Liberal | Nicole Picot | 895 | 11.47 | -8.91 |
| People's Alliance | Wendell Betts | 234 | 3.00 | -4.83 |
| New Democratic | Geoffrey Noseworthy | 117 | 1.50 | -0.25 |
| Total valid votes | | 7,801 | 99.77 | |
| Total rejected ballots | | 18 | 0.23 | |
| Turnout | | 7,819 | 71.04 | |
| Eligible voters | | 11,006 | | |
| Green hold | | Swing | | -9.71 |

2018 New Brunswick general election
| Party | Candidate | Votes | % | ±% |
|---|---|---|---|---|
| Green | David Coon | 4,273 | 56.31 | +25.63 |
| Liberal | Susan Holt | 1,525 | 20.10 | -1.52 |
| Progressive Conservative | Scott Smith | 1,042 | 13.73 | -12.44 |
| People's Alliance | Bonnie Clark | 616 | 8.12 | -- |
| New Democratic | Chris Durrant | 132 | 1.74 | -18.04 |
| Total valid votes | | 7,588 | 100.0 | |
| Total rejected ballots | | | | |
| Turnout | | | | |
| Eligible voters | | | | |
| Green hold | | Swing | | +13.58 |

2014 New Brunswick general election
| Party | Candidate | Votes | % |
|---|---|---|---|
| Green | David Coon | 2,272 | 30.68 |
| Progressive Conservative | Craig Leonard | 1,938 | 26.17 |
| Liberal | Roy Wiggins | 1,601 | 21.62 |
| New Democratic | Kelly Lamrock | 1,465 | 19.78 |
| Independent | Courtney Mills | 130 | 1.76 |
| Total valid votes | | 7,406 | 100.0 |
| Total rejected ballots | | 18 | 0.24 |
| Turnout | | 7,424 | 71.27 |
| Eligible voters | | 10,417 | |
This district was created from parts of Fredericton-Silverwood and Fredericton-Lincoln, both elected a Progressive Conservative in the previous election. Craig Leonard was the incumbent from Fredericton-Lincoln.
Source: Elections New Brunswick, CBC News
