= Eric MacKenzie (politician) =

Canadian politician and educator

Eric MacKenzie (born 1938) is an educator and former political figure in New Brunswick, Canada. He represented Fredericton-Fort Nashwaak in the Legislative Assembly of New Brunswick from 1999 to 2003 as a Progressive Conservative member.

He was born in Moncton, New Brunswick, the son of Daniel MacKenzie. After graduating from high school, he served in the Canadian Navy. He went on to study at the University of New Brunswick and St. Thomas University. He was a math teacher in Fredericton, also teaching in Bagotville, Quebec and St. Andrews.

MacKenzie was defeated when he ran for reelection in 2003. He later served on the executive committee of the National Capital Commission in Ottawa. In 2007, he was named to the board of directors for the New Brunswick Capital Commission.
