= 2013 New Brunswick electoral redistribution =

The 2013 New Brunswick electoral redistribution was undertaken through the process set out in the Electoral Boundaries and Representation Act of New Brunswick, Canada. The legislation establishes a statutory requirement for redistribution of electoral districts after every second New Brunswick general election.

A commission was struck to draw 49 electoral districts, a decrease from 55 districts, which will first be used in the 2014 provincial election. The 49 boundaries will have to be within the range of 95% to 105% of the 1/49th of the number of registered voters in the province except in "extraordinary circumstances".

Under the legislation, the commission will be chaired by one anglophone and one francophone and consist of 3 to 5 other commissioners, all of whom must be New Brunswick residents.

== Legislative changes ==
The Electoral Boundaries and Representation Act of 2005 set out for a redistribution of 55 ridings after every decennial census with ridings within plus or minus 10% of 1/55th of the population. In Fall 2012, the legislation was amended to reduce the number of ridings to 49, shift away from census-based population numbers to the number of registered voters, and to make the process occur after every second election (approximately once every 8 years) rather than after each census (once every 10 years).

== Commission ==
The commission was appointed on August 28, 2012, following the unanimous recommendation of a committee of the Legislative Assembly of New Brunswick. Its members are:

- Co-chair: Annise Hollies, former chief electoral officer of New Brunswick
- Co-chair: Allan Maher, former member of the legislative assembly (1978–1995)
- Member: Conde Grondin, retired professor of political science
- Member: Sue Murray, executive director of Atlantic Provinces Medical Peer Review
- Member: Jean-Guy Rioux, retired teacher and past president of La Federation des communautés francophones et acadienne du Canada
- Member: James Stanley, a lawyer involved with the labour movement

== Public hearings ==
Hearings were held in 13 communities around New Brunswick in October and early November 2012. Following these preliminary hearings, the commission created a draft proposal for public consideration at a second round of hearings that were held in February and March 2013.

== New boundaries ==
The commission released a draft map on January 17, 2013, which was open to changes following public consultations held from February 17 to March 6, 2013. Thereafter, the Commission prepared a final map, released on April 25. The Commission drew mostly completely new ridings. They said that because they had to reduce the number of ridings by about 10%, the tinkering that had been undertaken by previous boundaries commissions was not possible:

When a Commission’s mandate is to make little or no change to the total number of ridings, it is both reasonable and practical to begin the work with the existing boundaries and see what if any adjustments should be made. However, the Legislative Assembly has instructed this Commission to draw a map with substantially fewer ridings. In order to meet the requirements of the legislation, the Commission must not simply revise existing boundaries – they must build an entirely new electoral map.

The 49 ridings proposed in January were altered only slightly in the final map released on April 25. The final map was reviewed again by the commission after 23 appeals were filed backed by members of the legislature. The Commission adopted two name changes, and one minor boundary change affecting 35 voters as a result of the appeals.

=== New districts ===
These districts are almost entirely new, not reflecting any one former district or a merger of the majority of two previous districts.

Final name for district	Preliminary name for district	Preliminary description of district	Changes from preliminary report	Predecessor district(s)*
Bathurst East-Nepisiguit-Saint-Isidore	Bathurst East-Nepisiguit	The City of Bathurst, is divided in two along the Middle River. The Eastern portion joins a largely rural area south and east of the city to form Bathurst East-Nepisiguit, which the Western portion forms an urban/sub-urban riding with Beresford.	Loses Little River area to Bathurst West; loses Saint-Léolin to Caraquet; gains Saint-Isodore area from Caraquet	Centre-Péninsule-Saint-Sauveur (37%); Nepisiguit (34%); Bathurst (26%); Caraquet (3%)
Bathurst West-Beresford		The City of Bathurst, is divided in two along the Middle River. The Eastern portion joins a largely rural area south and east of the city to form Bathurst East-Nepisiguit, which the Western portion forms an urban/sub-urban riding with Beresford.	Territory around the Tetagouche river exchanged with Restigouche-Chaleur; gains territory from Bathurst East in the Little River area.	Bathurst (52%); Nigadoo-Chaleur (30%); Nepisiguit (18%)
Carleton		The northernmost parts of the riding of Woodstock (around the Town of Woodstock) and the southern parts of the old riding of Carleton.	Minor changes along the northern boundary	Woodstock (60%); Carleton (40%)
Fredericton North		The centre part of the northside of the city of Fredericton, including most of the historic community of Marysville, all of Devon and St. Mary's First Nation and part of Nashwaaksis.	Marysville removed and the missing part of Nashwaaksis added.	Fredericton-Nashwaaksis (60%); Fredericton-Fort Nashwaak (40%)
Fredericton South		The centre part of the southside of the city of Fredericton.	No changes	Fredericton-Silverwood (58%); Fredericton-Lincoln (42%)
Fredericton-York	Nashwaaksis-Stanley	Most of the historic community of Nashwaaksis from the city of Fredericton and points north thereof up to the municipality of Stanley.	Loses Nashwaaksis, while gaining part of Marysville and all of the communities along the Nashwaak River	York North (47%); Fredericton-Nashwaaksis (38%); Fredericton-Fort Nashwaak (15%)
Gagetown-Petitcodiac		A large rural riding about 125 km across in the south-centre of the province including the municipalities of Gagetown, Cambridge Narrows and Petitcodiac.	Gains slight amounts of territory to its east while losing slight amounts to its south	Petitcodiac (45%); Grand Lake-Gagetown (35%); Oromocto (13%); Kings East (5%); Hampton-Kings (3%)
Hampton	Hampton-Fundy	Combination of the town of Hampton with coastal and suburban areas west of Saint John	Loses some of the coastal communities while gaining part of the City of Saint John	Hampton-Kings (47%); Saint John-Fundy (18%); Saint John East (18%); Quispamsis (12%); Rothesay (6%)
Kings Centre		The northwestern part of Kings County stretching from Grand Bay-Westfield along the Kingston Peninsula to Norton.	Gains slight territory north of the Kingston Peninsula	Fundy-River Valley (55%); Hampton-Kings (39%); Kings East (6%)
Moncton Centre		The geographic centre of the city of Moncton.	A number of neighbourhoods were exchanged between this riding and its neighbours.	Moncton East (59%); Moncton North (41%)
Moncton East		The easternmost parts of the city of Moncton (not to be confused with the former district of Moncton East), including large parts taken from the former districts that contained the northeastern parts of the city.	Minor exchanges of territory in the northern part of the riding	Moncton East (31%); Moncton Crescent (20%); Memramcook-Lakeville-Dieppe (17%); Kent South (14%); Dieppe Centre-Lewisville (11%); Petitcodiac (6%)
Moncton Southwest		The southwestern part of the city of Moncton and surrounding suburban areas.	A number of neighbourhoods were exchanged between this riding and its neighbours.	Moncton North (48%); Petitcodiac (24%); Moncton West (15%); Moncton Crescent (12%)
Restigouche West		Restigouche County south and west of the communities of Campbellton and Dalhousie.	A few communities were exchanged between it and neighbouring ridings.	Restigouche-La-Vallée (39%); Campbellton-Restigouche Centre (37%); Dalhousie-Restigouche East (24%)
Shediac Bay-Dieppe		Communities in and around Shediac Bay moving inland to the northeastern part of the City of Dieppe.	Exchanged neighbourhoods within the city of Dieppe with Dieppe; loses Cocagne to Kent South	Kent South (48%); Dieppe Centre-Lewisville (28%); Memramcook-Lakeville-Dieppe (20%); Shediac-Cap-Pelé (4%)
Carleton-York		York County west of Fredericton except for the Hanwell-Kingslear area and McAdam area as well as small parts of southern Carleton County.	Loses Douglas to Fredericton-York	York North (56%); Woodstock (32%); York (12%)

* - measured in the percentage of its polling stations that came from the noted districts

=== Merged districts ===
These districts are a result of a merger of large parts of two previous districts.

Final name for district	Preliminary name for district	Preliminary description of district	Changes from preliminary report	Predecessor district(s)*
Campbellton-Dalhousie		The City of Campbellton and the Town of Dalhousie with those communities lying along the 20 kilometres between them.	Exchanged a few communities with neighbouring districts.	Dalhousie-Restigouche East (54%); Campbellton-Restigouche Centre (46%)
Carleton-Victoria		Merger of most of Carleton with most of Victoria-Tobique.	Slight adjustments to its southern boundary.	Victoria-Tobique (57%); Carleton (43%)
Fredericton-Grand Lake	Grand Lake	The communities on the western side of Grand Lake stretching along Route 10 and the Saint John river into parts of the City of Fredericton east of the Nashwaak River.	Gained most of Marysville; lost most unincorporated areas along the Nashwaak River.	Grand Lake-Gagetown (56%); Fredericton-Fort Nashwaak (44%)
Fredericton West-Hanwell	Hanwell-Silverwood	The southwestern part of the City of Fredericton with the suburban communities of Hanwell and Kingsclear.	No change	York (56%); Fredericton-Silverwood (44%)
Kent South		Bouctouche returns to the district, while the Cocagne area leaves. Gains most of western and southern parts of old Kent district	Minor changes along its northern and southern boundaries	Kent (55%); Kent South (45%)
Miramichi		Most of the City of Miramichi except for the historic community of Douglastown.	No changes	Miramichi Centre (51%); Miramichi-Bay du Vin (49%)
Oromocto-Lincoln**		The Town of Oromocto, community of Lincoln, and southeastern parts of the City of Fredericton.	No changes	Oromocto (50%); Fredericton-Lincoln (50%)
Saint John East		The southern parts of the old Saint John East district with the city parts of the old Saint John-Fundy district	Loses some of the city to Hampton, while gaining some of the city from Rothesay; exchanges neighbourhoods with Saint John Portland	Saint John East (59%); Saint John-Fundy (41%)

* - measured in the percentage of its polling stations that came from the noted districts
** - riding was later renamed Oromocto-Lincoln-Fredericton in 2017.

=== Largely unchanged districts ===
These districts underwent only minor changes.

Final name for district	Preliminary name for district	Preliminary description of district	Changes from preliminary report	Predecessor district(s)*
Albert		The district adds the Salisbury area and more of Riverview.	Keeps some territory in its northwest corner it was to have lost.	Albert (86%); Petitcodiac (11%); Riverview (3%)
Caraquet	Caraquet-Centre Péninsule	Merger of most of the district of Caraquet and the central parts of Centre-Peninsule-Saint-Saveur.	Retains Saint-Léolin unlike the previous proposal and takes in less territory from Centre-Peninsule.	Caraquet (78%); Centre-Peninsule-Saint-Saveur (22%)
Charlotte-Campobello**		The district moves north to take in the McAdam area.	No change	Charlotte-Campobello (74%); York (15%); Charlotte-The Isles (10%)
Charlotte-The Isles		The district moves east to take in Musquash and parts of Saint John.	No change	Charlotte-The Isles (71%); Fundy-River Valley (29%)
Dieppe		The western half of the City of Dieppe.	Exchanged some neighbourhoods with Shediac Bay-Dieppe	Dieppe Centre-Lewisville (77%); Memramcook-Lakeville-Dieppe (23%)
Edmundston-Madawaska Centre		The Edmundston-St. Basile district loses parts of the City of Edmundston and adds equal parts of Madawaska County.	Exchanged some territory with Madawaska-les-Lacs-Edmundston	Edmundston-St. Basile (71%); Restigouche-la-Vallée (29%)
Kent North		Rogersville-Kouchibouguac adds parts of the Kent district.	No change.	Rogersville-Kouchibouguac (78%); Kent (23%)
Madawaska-les-Lacs-Edmundston		Madawaska-les-Lacs adds more of the City of Edmundston.	Exchanged some territory with Edmundston-Madawaska Centre	Madawaska-les-Lacs (81%); Edmundston-St. Basile (16%); Restigouche-la-Vallée (2%)
Memramcook-Tantramar	Sackville-Memramcook	Merger of all of Tantrmar with the Memramcook part of Memramcook-Lakeville-Dieppe.	No change.	Tantramar (67%); Memramcook-Lakeville-Dieppe (33%)
Miramichi Bay-Neguac		Adds more of the City of Miramichi.	Slight changes to its northern boundary	Miramichi Bay-Neguac (64%); Miramichi Centre (29%); Southwest Miramichi (7%)
Moncton Northwest		The northwestern part of the city of Moncton and surrounding suburban areas, taken largely from the old Moncton Crescent district that was more than 20% overpopulated.	Minor exchanges of territory with neighbouring districts.	Moncton Crescent (92%); Petitcodiac (8%)
Moncton South		Minor changes to the Moncton West district.	Minor exchanges of territory with neighbouring districts.	Moncton West (84%); Moncton East (10%); Moncton Crescent (6%)
New Maryland-Sunbury		New Maryland-Sunbury West takes those parts of Sunbury County south of the town of Oromocto that were previously in the Oromocto district.	Adds South Oromocto Lake area.	New Maryland-Sunbury West (70%); Oromocto (22%); Fredericton-Lincoln (5%); Fredericton-Silverwood (3%)
Quispamsis		Loses part of the Town of Quispamsis to Hampton-Fundy.	No change	Quispamsis (100%)
Restigouche-Chaleur		Those parts of Restigouche and Gloucester counties along the Bay of Chaleur from Bathurst to Dalhousie.	Exchanges communities on its eastern border and loses territory on its western border	Nigadoo-Chaleur (61)%; Nepisiguit (26%); Dalhousie-Restigouche East (13%)
Riverview		Loses part of the Town of Riverview to Albert.	No change	Riverview (100%)
Rothesay		Minor changes.	Minor changes.	Rothesay (75%); Saint John-Fundy (25%)
Saint John Harbour		Minor changes.	Minor changes.	Saint John Harbour (79%); Saint John Portland (21%)
Saint John Lancaster		Minor changes.	No changes.	Saint John Lancaster (97%); Fundy-River Valley (3%)
Saint John Portland		Minor changes.	Exchanged neighbourhoods with Saint John East.	Saint John Portland (56%); Saint John East (33%); Saint John Harbour (8%); Rothesay (3%)
Shediac-Beaubassin	Shediac-Beaubassin-Cap-Pelé	Loses small parts to the west of the Town of Shediac.	No change.	Shediac-Cap-Pelé (100%)
Shippagan-Lamèque-Miscou		Adds the Inkerman and Pokemouche areas.	No change.	Lamèque-Shippagan-Miscou (84%); Centre-Péninsule-Saint-Saveur (16%)
Sussex-Fundy-St. Martins	Kings East	Minor changes.	Expands southward to take in the St. Martins area	Kings East (78%); Hampton-Kings (11%); Saint John-Fundy (11%)
Southwest Miramichi-Bay du Vin		Southwest Miramichi adds those parts of Miramichi-Bay du Vin outside of the City of Miramichi.	No change.	Southwest Miramichi (71%); Miramichi-Bay du Vin (29%)
Tracadie-Sheila		Minor changes.	Minor changes.	Tracadie-Sheila (83%); Miramichi Bay-Neguac (11%); Centre-Péninsule-Saint-Saveur (6%)
Victoria-la-Vallée		The Grand Falls-Drummond-Saint-André district adds the St. Leonard area	No change	Grand Falls-Drummond-Saint-André (73%); Restigouche-la-Vallée (16%); Victoria-Tobique (11%)

* - measured in the percentage of its polling stations that came from the noted districts
** - riding was later renamed Saint Croix in 2016.

== Former districts ==
The commission was mandated with the creation of 49 districts, where 55 had existed before. The Commission stated this required recreating a map from scratch, though by coincidence, not design, some new districts resembled preceding districts. The old districts transposed into the new districts as follows.

=== Largely intact districts ===
In these districts, 70% or more of their polling stations continued into a new district.

Name of former district	Successor district(s)*
Albert	Albert (99%); Sussex-Fundy-St. Martins (1%)
Caraquet	Caraquet (97%); Bathurst East-Nepisiguit-Saint-Isidore (3%)
Charlotte-Campobello	Charlotte-Campobello (100%)
Charlotte-The Isles	Charlotte-The Isles (87%); Charlotte-Campobello (13%)
Edmundston-Saint-Basile	Edmundston-Madawaska Centre (78%); Madawaska-les-Lacs-Edmundston (22%)
Grand Falls-Drummond-Saint-André	Victoria-la-Vallée (100%)
Kent	Kent South (72%); Kent North (28%)
Kings East	Sussex-Fundy-St. Martins (88%); Gagetown-Petitcodiac (6%); Kings Centre (6%)
Lamèque-Shippagan-Miscou	Shippagan-Lamèque-Miscou (100%)
Madawaska-les-Lacs	Madawaska-les-Lacs-Edmundston (100%)
Miramichi Bay-Neguac	Miramichi Bay-Neguac (87%); Tracadie-Sheila (13%)
Moncton West	Moncton South (84%); Moncton Southwest (16%)
New Maryland-Sunbury West	New Maryland-Sunbury (100%)
Nigadoo-Chaleur	Restigouche-Chaleur (70%); Bathurst West-Beresford (30%)
Quispamsis	Quispamsis (87%); Hampton (13%)
Riverview	Riverview (97%); Albert (3%)
Rogersville-Kouchibouguac	Kent North (100%)
Rothesay	Rothesay (89%); Hampton (7%); Saint John Portland (4%)
Saint John Harbour	Saint John Harbour (90%); Saint John Portland (10%)
Saint John Lancaster	Saint John Lancaster (100%)
Saint John Portland	Saint John Portland (74%); Saint John Harbour (26%)
Shediac-Cap-Pelé	Shediac-Beaubassin-Cap-Pelé (97%); Shediac Bay-Dieppe (3%)
Southwest Miramichi	Southwest Miramichi-Bay du Vin (91%); Miramichi Bay-Neguac (9%)
Tantramar	Memramcook-Tantramar (100%)
Tracadie-Sheila	Tracadie-Sheila (100%)
Victoria-Tobique	Carleton-Victoria (86%); Victoria-la-Vallée (14%)

* - measured in the percentage of its polling stations that went to the noted districts

=== Split districts ===
These districts were split more or less in two.

Name of former district	Successor district(s)*
Bathurst	Bathurst West-Beresford (63%); Bathurst East-Nepisiguit-Saint-Isidore (37%)
Campbellton-Restigouche Centre	Campbellton-Dalhousie (53%); Restigouche West (47%)
Carleton	Carleton-Victoria (58%); Carleton (42%)
Fredericton-Lincoln	Oromocto-Lincoln (55%); Fredericton South (39%); New Maryland-Sunbury (6%)
Fredericton-Nashwaaksis	Fredericton North (58%); Fredericton-York (42%)
Fredericton-Silverwood	Fredericton South (55%); Fredericton West-Hanwell (42%); New Maryland-Sunbury (3%)
Fundy-River Valley	Kings Centre (60%); Charlotte-The Isles (37%); Saint John Lancaster (3%)
Grand Lake-Gagetown	Fredericton-Grand Lake (59%); Gagetown-Petitcodiac (41%)
Miramichi-Bay du Vin	Miramichi (57%); Southwest Miramichi-Bay du Vin (43%)
Miramichi Centre	Miramichi (60%); Miramichi Bay-Neguac (40%)
Moncton North	Moncton Southwest (53%); Moncton Centre (47%)
Woodstock	Carleton (62%); York (38%)
York North	York (59%); Fredericton-York (41%)

* - measured in the percentage of its polling stations that went to the noted districts

=== Dispersed districts ===
These districts were abolished with their parts being widely spread across several new districts.

Name of former district	Successor district(s)*
Centre-Péninsule-Saint-Sauveur	Bathurst East-Nepisiguit-Saint-Isidore (47%); Caraquet (27%); Shippagan-Lamèque-Miscou (20%); Tracadie-Sheila (7%)
Dalhousie-Restigouche East	Campbellton-Dalhousie (57%); Restigouche West (29%); Restigouche-Chaleur (14%)
Dieppe Centre-Lewisville	Dieppe (65%); Shediac Bay-Dieppe (23%); Moncton East (13%)
Fredericton-Fort Nashwaak	Fredericton-Grand Lake (48%); Fredericton North (36%); Fredericton-York (15%)
Hampton-Kings	Hampton (47%); Kings Centre (38%); Sussex-Fundy-St. Martins (12%); Gagetown-Petitcodiac (3%)
Kent South	Kent South (53%); Shediac Bay-Dieppe (33%); Moncton East (14%)
Memramcook-Lakeville-Dieppe	Memramcook-Tantramar (41%); Dieppe (21%); Moncton East (21%); Shediac Bay-Dieppe (17%)
Moncton Crescent	Moncton Northwest (63%); Moncton East (20%); Moncton Southwest (11%); Moncton South (6%)
Moncton East	Moncton Centre (59%); Moncton East (32%); Moncton South (9%)
Nepisiguit	Bathurst East-Nepisiguit-Saint-Isidore (45%); Restigouche-Chaleur (34%); Bathurst West-Beresford (21%)
Oromocto	Oromocto-Lincoln (58%); New Maryland-Sunbury (26%); Gagetown-Petitcodiac (16%)
Petitcodiac	Gagetown-Petitcodiac (53%); Moncton Southwest (24%); Albert (12%); Moncton East (6%); Moncton Northwest (6%)
Restigouche-La-Vallée	Restigouche West (48%); Edmundston-Madawaska Centre (30%); Victoria-la-Vallée (18%); Madawaska-les-Lacs-Edmundston (3%)
Saint John East	Saint John East (49%); Saint John Portland (34%); Hampton (17%)
Saint John-Fundy	Saint John East (40%); Rothesay (27%); Hampton (20%); Sussex-Fundy-St. Martins (13%)
York	Fredericton West-Hanwell (62%); Charlotte-Campobello (21%); York (17%)

* - measured in the percentage of its polling stations that went to the noted districts

== Court challenge ==
After the release of the map, several Francophone organizations indicated they planned to challenge the law in court. The court challenge was initially delayed because of mediation between the groups and the provincial government. Mediation broke down without a result satisfactory to the groups, so they filed to challenge the boundaries in court. Two organizations and two individuals filed a joint suit against the process in general, and specifically including the communities of Memramcook and Neguac in majority Anglophone districts.

== Sources ==
Preceded by 2006	New Brunswick electoral redistributions	Succeeded by 2021
