= Craig Leonard =

Canadian politician

Minister of Energy
- In office 9 October 2012 – 2014
- Premier: David Alward
- Preceded by: Margaret-Ann Blaney
- In office 12 October 2010 – 15 March 2012
- Premier: David Alward
- Preceded by: Jack Keir
- Succeeded by: Margaret-Ann Blaney

Minister of Government Services
- In office 15 March 2012 – 9 October 2012
- Premier: David Alward
- Preceded by: Claude Williams
- Succeeded by: Sue Stultz

Member of the New Brunswick Legislative Assembly for Fredericton-Lincoln
- In office September 27, 2010 – September 22, 2014
- Preceded by: Greg Byrne
- Succeeded by: David Coon

Personal details
- Born: Fredericton, New Brunswick
- Party: Progressive Conservative

Craig Leonard is a Canadian politician, who was elected to the Legislative Assembly of New Brunswick in the 2010 provincial election. He represented the electoral district of Fredericton-Lincoln as a member of the Progressive Conservatives until the 2014 provincial election, when he was defeated by David Coon in the redistributed riding of Fredericton South.
