= Green Party of New Brunswick =

Provincial political party in Canada

Green Party of New Brunswick Parti vert du Nouveau-Brunswick
- Leader: David Coon
- President: Ryan Spencer
- Deputy leaders: Megan Mitton; Kevin Arseneau
- Founded: May 18, 2008; 18 years ago
- Headquarters: 403 Regent Street, Suite 206 Fredericton, NB E3B 3X6
- Youth wing: New Brunswick Young Greens
- Ideology: Green politics
- Political position: Centre-left
- National affiliation: Green Party of Canada
- Colours: Green
- Slogan: "It’s About the Next Generation"
- Seats in Legislature: 2 / 49

Website
- greenpartynb.ca

The Green Party of New Brunswick (GPNB or PVNBGP; French: Parti vert du Nouveau-Brunswick), commonly known as the Greens, is a green provincial political party in New Brunswick, Canada. Formed in 2008, the party has been under the leadership of David Coon since 2012. The party currently holds two seats in the Legislative Assembly of New Brunswick, making it the only minor party in the province currently represented in the legislative assembly.

On November 15, 2008, it held a founding convention in Moncton where the membership adopted a constitution, and a charter of principles to guide the development of policies and platforms. A 12-member executive committee was elected. In September 2009, Jack MacDougall was acclaimed as the first leader of the party, serving under the position until stepping down in September 2011. Greta Doucet served as interim leader until the leadership convention in 2012. David Coon succeeded Doucet as leader.

In the 2014 provincial election, Coon became the first Green Party candidate to be elected in the Legislative Assembly of New Brunswick. In the 2018 provincial election, the party elected three MLAs. In the 2020 provincial election, those three MLAs were all re-elected.

== History ==
New Brunswick's Green Party was formed on May 18, 2008, the last province in the Maritimes to do so. Established during a Fredericton meeting, the party seized the opportunity presented by the province's decline in NDP presence, positioning itself as an alternative for such voters. Upon its formation, it became under elected interim leadership by Mike Milligan. In September 2009, the Green Party acclaimed its first leader, former Liberal organizer and candidate Jack MacDougall. After MacDougall resigned in September 2011, the party leadership has held in an interim capacity by Greta Doucet until September 2012, when the party elected conservationist David Coon at its leadership convention.

In the 2014 election, the Greens secured their first ever seat in the Legislative Assembly of New Brunswick and became the second Canadian Green party to win a provincial legislative seat, with leader David Coon having defeated the incumbent Progressive Conservative Energy Minister Craig Leonard in the Fredericton South riding. Some of Coon's key messages at the time included his opposition to fracking as well as the Energy East pipeline.

On September 14, 2023, the party announced the appointing of Kevin Arseneau and Megan Mitton as Deputy Leaders by leader Coon.

== Leadership ==
=== Leaders ===
Leader	Term of office		Notes
Mike Milligan	2008	2009	Interim
Erik Millett	2009	2009	Interim
Jack MacDougall	2009	2011	
Greta Doucet	2011	2012	Interim
David Coon	2012	Present	

== Leadership elections ==
=== 2012 ===
On September 22, 2012, a leadership election was held to replace Jack MacDougall. David Coon was chosen after only one ballot.

Candidate	Votes	Percentage
David Coon	131	63%
Roy MacMulin	77	37%
TOTAL	208	

== Current members of the legislature ==
Name	Riding	First elected
David Coon	Fredericton-Lincoln	2014
Megan Mitton	Tantramar	2018

== Electoral record ==
Election	Leader	Votes	%	Seats	+/–	Position	Government
2010	Jack MacDougall	16,943	4.6%	0 / 55	0	▲4th	Extra-parliamentary
2014	David Coon	24,582	6.6%	1 / 49	▲1	▲3rd	No status
2018	David Coon	45,186	11.9%	3 / 49	▲2	▼4th	Third Party
2020	David Coon	56,872	15.4%	3 / 49	0	▲3rd	Third Party
2024	David Coon	49,912	13.7%	2 / 49	▼1	3rd	Third Party

== See also ==
- List of Green party leaders in Canada
- List of Green politicians who have held office in Canada
- List of New Brunswick general elections
- List of political parties in New Brunswick
- Politics of New Brunswick
