= 58th New Brunswick Legislature =

- Majority parliament

Parliament leaders
- Premier: Brian Gallant
- Leader of the Opposition: Bruce Fitch; Blaine Higgs; 2014–16; 2016–18

Party caucuses
- Government: Liberal Party
- Opposition: Progressive Conservative Party
- Recognized: Green Party

Legislative Assembly
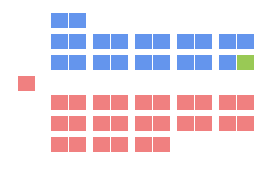
- Seating arrangements of the Legislative Assembly
- Members: 49 MLA seats

Sovereign
- Monarch: Elizabeth II; 6 February 1952 – 8 September 2022
- Lieutenant governor: Jocelyne Roy-Vienneau; 23 October 2014 – 2 August 2019
← 57th	→ 59th

The 58th New Brunswick Legislative Assembly was created following a general election in 2014 and dissolved on August 23, 2018, for the new general election.

== Leadership ==
Lieutenant Governor Jocelyne Roy-Vienneau was installed October 23, 2014.

Speaker Chris Collins was elected October 24, 2014 and served for the duration of the legislature.

Premier of New Brunswick Brian Gallant (Liberal) led the Government for the duration of the legislature.

Leader of the Opposition Blaine Higgs (Progressive Conservative) led the Official Opposition from fall 2016 until the end of the legislature. Higgs was preceded by the interim leader of his party Bruce Fitch.

== History ==
On 1 December 2015, the Gallant government opened the legislature's second session with a promise to "get tough" on the province's tattered finances. The speech from the throne documented how the province had accumulated a debt of $12.4 billion by failing to produce a balanced budget since 2007. The province spent more on interest payments than it did on post-secondary education, and the consultation of citizens called the "Strategic Program Review" had all but concluded. The province said its credit rating was at risk, and the costs to service the debt if the rating were downgraded would then rise. The projected deficit for the 2015–16 budget was at the time $453 million. A report issued the previous Friday had calculated at $300 million the benefit to the government of a two-percent rise of the harmonized sales tax (HST) from 13% to 15%.

On 2 December 2015, it was brought to light that the province's Chief Medical Officer of Health Dr. Eilish Cleary had been obliged by her Deputy Minister to go "on leave". She said she was not allowed to discuss the reasons for the leave. "I was surprised and upset when it happened. The whole situation has caused me significant stress and anxiety. And not being able to talk about it makes it worse." Her office had been "developing a plan to further explore" the carcinogenic effects of glyphosate, a substance which was found earlier in 2015 to be "probably carcinogenic to humans" by the International Agency for Research on Cancer, a branch of the World Health Organization, and which is utilized in New Brunswick by forestry company J.D. Irving Ltd. and by NB Power, a provincial Crown corporation. Victor Boudreau, the Minister of Health at the time, told reporters Cleary's leave was "a personnel matter. It's not something we can comment about. It has nothing to do with the office per se, or the independence of the office. It's an HR issue and I won't comment anymore." The next day, the Deputy Minister of Health, Tom Maston, rejected suggestions that Cleary was being silenced, and the Minister of Environment was questioned on the matter in the legislature. The leader of the opposition said that there was a "disturbing" trend of the Gallant Liberals trying to silence independent watchdogs, and pointed to the ruling party's recent feud with the Auditor-General and failure to appoint a new conflict of interest commissioner for six months. On 7 December, Cleary—who had been removed from her office on 2 November—stated in an e-mail that she had been fired by the provincial government without cause: "I can confirm that my employment as Chief Medical Officer has been terminated without cause effective immediately." The government did not respond to requests for information, while various opposition politicians made hay and a public protest ensued in support of Cleary. The next day, the Liberal government was grilled in question period. The Minister of Health maintained that the termination without cause was due to a personnel matter, while Cleary maintained that she was never told what the personnel issues were. On 15 January 2016, Cleary and her employer of nine years reached a settlement, which was not disclosed to the public. A statement was released, that "Dr. Cleary and the Department of Health have concluded a satisfactory agreement consistent with common law termination without cause principles."

In their 2016 budget, presented by Finance Minister Roger Melanson on 2 February 2016, the Liberal party increased, as forecast the previous December, the HST from 13% to 15%, effective 1 July 2016.

Cathy Rogers became the first female finance minister of the province in a cabinet shuffle that occurred on 6 June 2016. As well, Lisa Harris was appointed minister of Celtic affairs, a newly established cabinet post. Francine Landry continued as Minister for La Francophonie, while Victor Boudreau continued as Minister of Health. Brian Kenny replaced Serge Rousselle as the education minister, while the latter takes over at Environment and Local Government. Rousselle, who remains in post as Attorney-General, is the only lawyer in cabinet, apart from Gallant.

Rogers was only in her second week in post when the Canada Pension Plan (CPP) file exploded into acrimony. On 20 June 2016, Federal Minister of Finance Bill Morneau and eight of his provincial colleagues announced jointly that the CPP would become more expensive. The announcement was hailed as Ontario premier Kathleen Wynne's victory, since it would allow her to cancel the new provincial plan on which she had campaigned. The increase by one percentage point to 5.95 per cent of wages shall take place from 2019 to 2025. Rogers was pilloried in the provincial press and earned the ire of the Coalition of New Brunswick Employers, an alliance of 25 industry associations employing about two-thirds of the province's private-sector workforce.

On 2 November 2016, the Gallant government issued a speech from the Throne, its second in a year, and said that its contentious amendment to the Judicature Act, which would give to the government the power of veto over certain personnel decisions that theretofore had lain with the Chief Justice of the Queen's Bench, was to be revived. It had been allowed to fall off the order paper when the legislature wrapped up without its passage. Chief Justice David Smith earlier had challenged the authority of the Premier to implement his plan.

The Gallant government raised the ire of senior citizens with its plans to require access to confidential Revenue Canada files in exchange for those who sought social assistance. Cecile Cassista, the executive director of the Coalition for Seniors and Nursing Home Residents, saw it as "nothing more than another attempt by government to grab seniors' assets". Two days later, the Gallant government, in the person of Stephen Horsman, climbed down and pledged to rewrite the legislation.

== Members ==
Most of the current members were elected at the general election on September 22, 2014, Progressive Conservative Glen Savoie was elected at a November 17, 2014 by-election.

Name	Party	Riding	First elected / previously elected	Notes
Brian Keirstead	Progressive Conservative	Albert	2014 g.e.	Environment Critic
Denis Landry	Liberal	Bathurst East-Nepisiguit-Saint-Isidore	1995 g.e. 2003 g.e.	Natural Resources Minister; Human Resources Minister
Brian Kenny	Liberal	Bathurst West-Beresford	2003 g.e.	Environment and Local Government Minister
Donald Arseneault	Liberal	Campbellton-Dalhousie	2003 g.e.	Energy and Mines Minister
Hédard Albert	Liberal	Caraquet	2003 g.e.	Government House Leader; Chief Government Whip
David Alward	Progressive Conservative	Carleton	1999 g.e.	Agriculture, Aquaculture and Fisheries Critic
Stewart Fairgrieve	Progressive Conservative	Carleton	2015 by-e.	
Andrew Harvey	Liberal	Carleton-Victoria	2014 g.e.	
Carl Urquhart	Progressive Conservative	Carleton-York	2006 g.e.	Opposition Whip
John Ames	Liberal	Charlotte-Campobello	2014 g.e.	
Roger Melanson	Liberal	Dieppe	2010 g.e.	Finance Minister; Transportation and Infrastructure Minister
Madeleine Dubé	Progressive Conservative	Edmundston-Madawaska Centre	1999 g.e.	Opposition House Leader; Health Critic
Pam Lynch	Progressive Conservative	Fredericton-Grand Lake	2010 g.e.	Opposition Caucus Chair
Stephen Horsman	Liberal	Fredericton North	2014 g.e.	Deputy Premier; Public Safety Minister; Justice Minister
David Coon	Green	Fredericton South	2014 g.e.	Third Party Leader
Brian Macdonald	Progressive Conservative	Fredericton West-Hanwell	2010 g.e.	Government Services Critic
Kirk MacDonald	Progressive Conservative	Fredericton-York	1999 g.e.	Economic Development Critic
Rick Doucet	Liberal	Fundy-The Isles-Saint John West	2003 g.e.	Economic Development Minister; Agriculture, Aquaculture and Fisheries Minister
Ross Wetmore	Progressive Conservative	Gagetown-Petitcodiac	2010 g.e.	Tourism, Heritage and Culture Critic
Gary Crossman	Progressive Conservative	Hampton	2014 g.e.	Education Critic
Bertrand LeBlanc	Liberal	Kent North	2010 g.e.	
Benoît Bourque	Liberal	Kent South	2014 g.e.	
Bill Oliver	Progressive Conservative	Kings Centre	2014 g.e.	Natural Resources Critic
Francine Landry	Liberal	Madawaska les Lacs-Edmundston	2014 g.e.	Post-Secondary Education, Training and Labour Critic
Bernard LeBlanc	Liberal	Memramcook-Tantramar	2006 g.e.	Deputy Speaker
Bill Fraser	Liberal	Miramichi	2006 g.e.	Tourism, Heritage and Culture Minister
Lisa Harris	Liberal	Miramichi Bay-Neguac	2014 g.e.	Deputy Speaker
Chris Collins	Liberal	Moncton Centre	2007 by-e.	Speaker
Chris Collins	Independent	Moncton Centre	2007 by-e.	
Monique LeBlanc	Liberal	Moncton East	2014 g.e.	Government Caucus Chair
Ernie Steeves	Progressive Conservative	Moncton Northwest	2014 g.e.	Social Development Critic
Cathy Rogers	Liberal	Moncton South	2014 g.e.	Social Development Minister; Healthy and Inclusive Communities Minister
Sherry Wilson	Progressive Conservative	Moncton Southwest	2010 g.e.	Local Government Critic; Health and Inclusive Communities Critic
Jeff Carr	Progressive Conservative	New Maryland-Sunbury	2014 g.e.	Transportation and Infrastructure Critic
Jody Carr	Progressive Conservative	Oromocto-Lincoln	1999 g.e.	
Trevor Holder	Progressive Conservative	Portland-Simonds	1999 g.e.	Post-Secondary Education, Training and Labour Critic
Blaine Higgs	Progressive Conservative	Quispamsis	2010 g.e.	Opposition Leader & Finance Critic
Daniel Guitard	Liberal	Restigouche-Chaleur	2014 g.e.	Government Deputy Whip
Gilles LePage	Liberal	Restigouche West	2014 g.e.	
Bruce Fitch	Progressive Conservative	Riverview	2003 g.e.	
Ted Flemming	Progressive Conservative	Rothesay	2012 by-e.	Justice Critic; Shadow Attorney General
Gary Keating	Liberal	Saint John East	2014 g.e.	Resigned October 14, 2014
Glen Savoie	Progressive Conservative	Saint John East	2010 g.e. 2014 by.e.	Elected in by-election on November 17, 2014.
Ed Doherty	Liberal	Saint John Harbour	2005 by-e. 2014 g.e.	Government Services Minister
Dorothy Shephard	Progressive Conservative	Saint John Lancaster	2010 g.e.	Human Resources Critic
Brian Gallant	Liberal	Shediac Bay-Dieppe	2013 by-e.	Premier
Victor Boudreau	Liberal	Shediac-Beaubassin-Cap-Pelé	2004 by-e.	Health Minister
Wilfred Roussel	Liberal	Shippagan-Lamèque-Miscou	2014 g.e.	
Jake Stewart	Progressive Conservative	Southwest Miramichi-Bay du Vin	2010 g.e.	Energy and Mines Critic
Bruce Northrup	Progressive Conservative	Sussex-Fundy-St. Martins	2006 g.e.	Public Safety Critic
Serge Rousselle	Liberal	Tracadie-Sheila	2014 g.e.	Education and Early Childhood Development Minister; Attorney General
Chuck Chiasson	Liberal	Victoria-la-Vallée	2014 g.e.	

=== Standings changes in the 58th Assembly ===
Number of members per party by date	2014			2015		2017	2018	
Number of members per party by date	September 22	October 14	November 17	May 22	October 5	November 30	May 10	July 1
Liberal	27	26				25	24	
Progressive Conservative	21		22	21	22			21
Green	1							
Independent	0						1	
Total members	49	48	49	48	49	48		47
Vacant	0	1	0	1	0	1		2
Government Majority	3	2				1	0	1

Membership changes in the 58th Assembly
Date	Name	District	Party	Reason
September 22, 2014	See List of Members			Election day of the 2014 New Brunswick general election
October 14, 2014	Gary Keating	Saint John East	Liberal	Resigned for personal reasons
November 17, 2014	Glen Savoie	Saint John East	Progressive Conservative	By-election
May 22, 2015	David Alward	Carleton	Progressive Conservative	Resigned after being named consul general to Boston
October 5, 2015	Stewart Fairgrieve	Carleton	Progressive Conservative	By-election
November 30, 2017	Donald Arseneault	Campbellton-Dalhousie	Liberal	Resigned
May 10, 2018	Chris Collins	Moncton Centre	Independent	Left Liberal Party due to disagreement over handling of harassment allegations
July 1, 2018	Madeleine Dubé	Edmundston-Madawaska Centre	Progressive Conservative	Resigned to accept appointment as vice-rector of the Université de Moncton

== See also ==
- 2010 New Brunswick general election
- 2014 New Brunswick general election
- Legislative Assembly of New Brunswick

Preceded by 57th Assembly	New Brunswick Legislative Assemblies; 2014–2018	Succeeded by 59th Assembly
