= 2018 New Brunswick general election =

Canadian provincial election

← 2014	September 24, 2018	2020 →

49 seats in the Legislative Assembly of New Brunswick 25 seats needed for a majority
- Turnout: 67.34% (▲2.69pp)
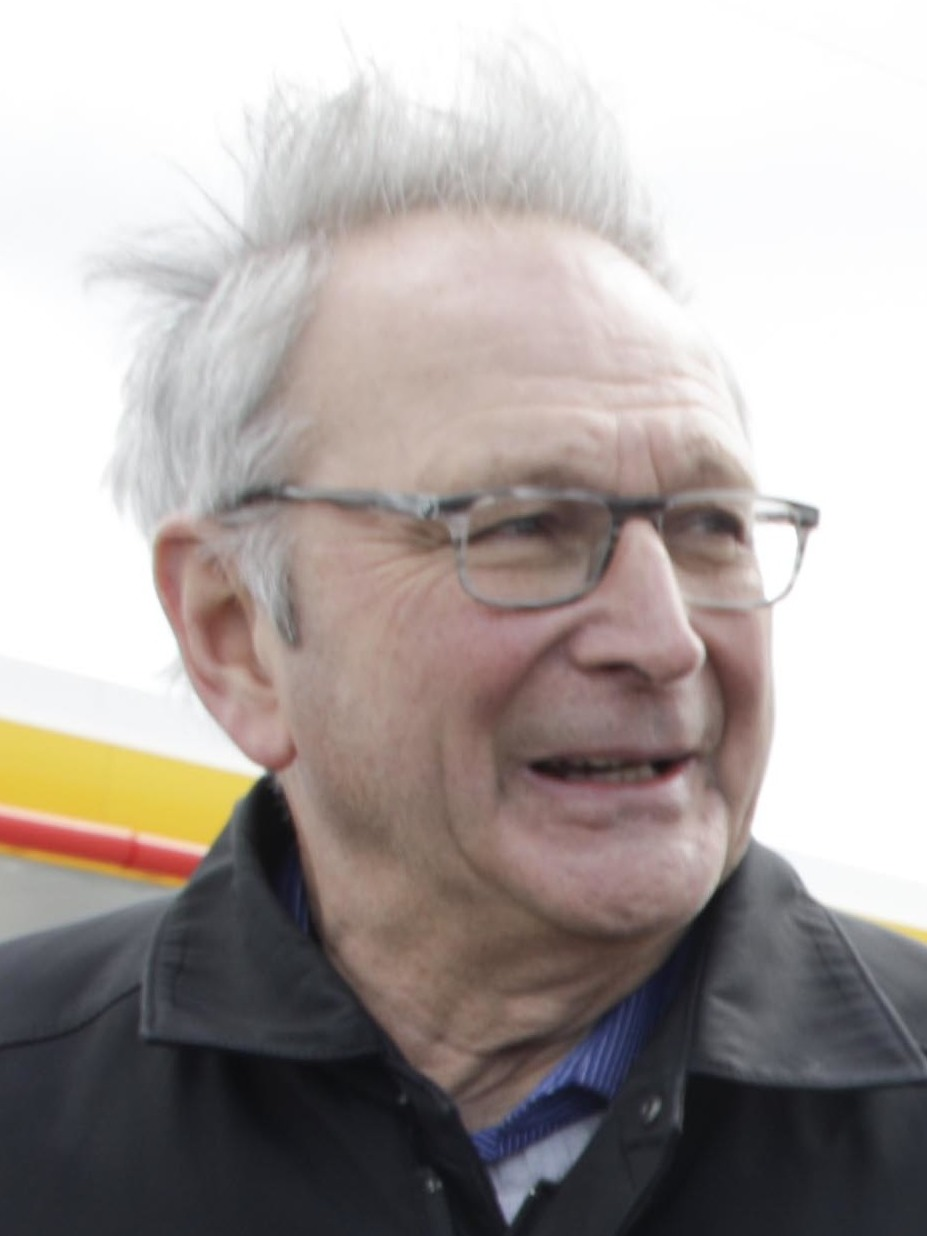

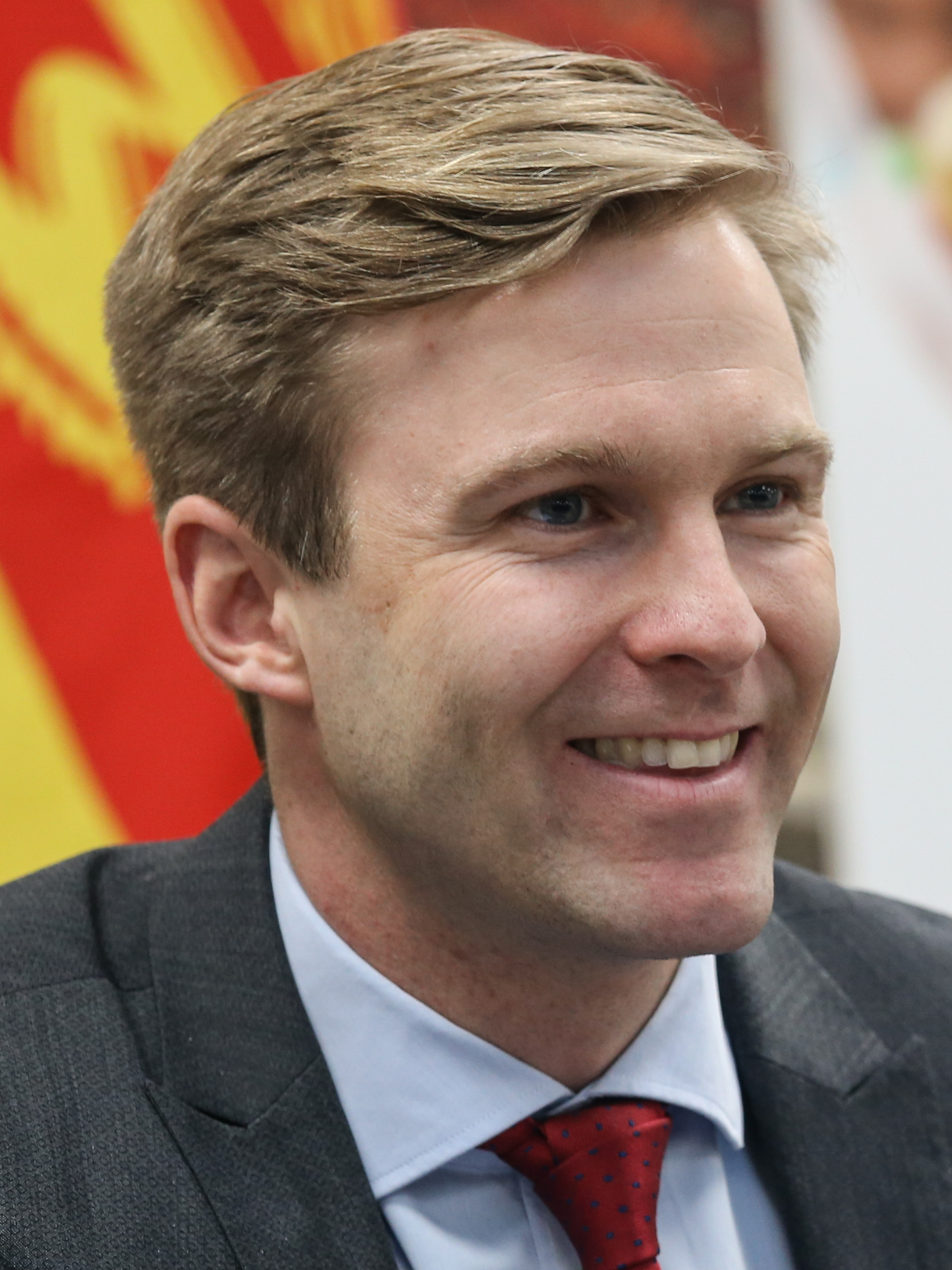

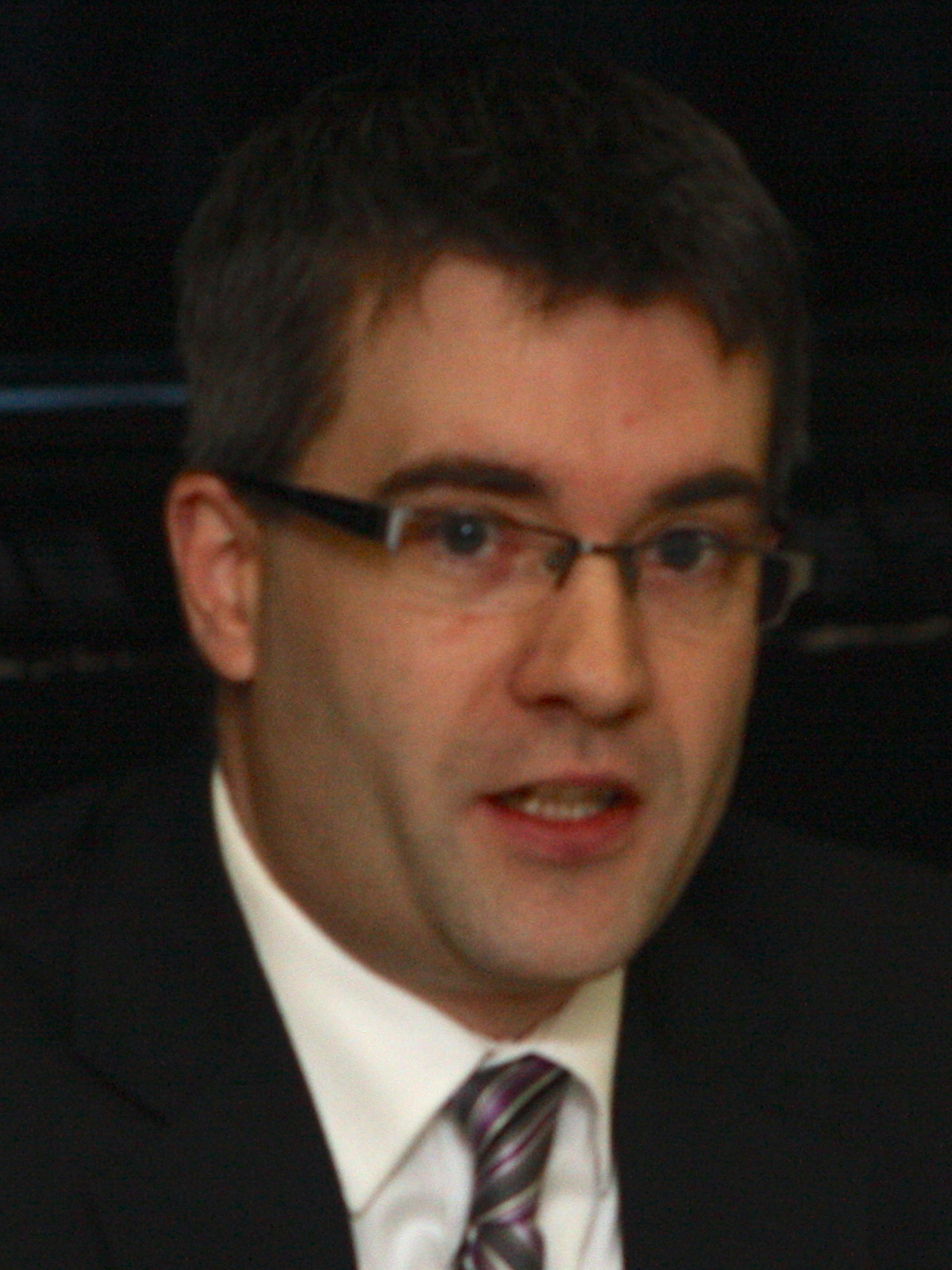

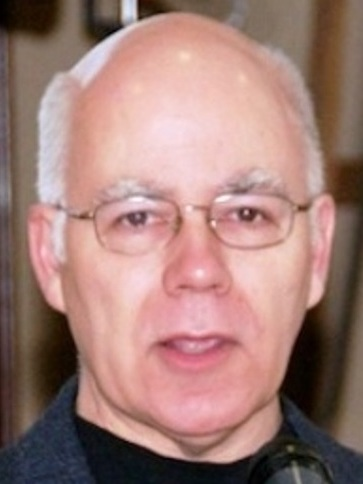

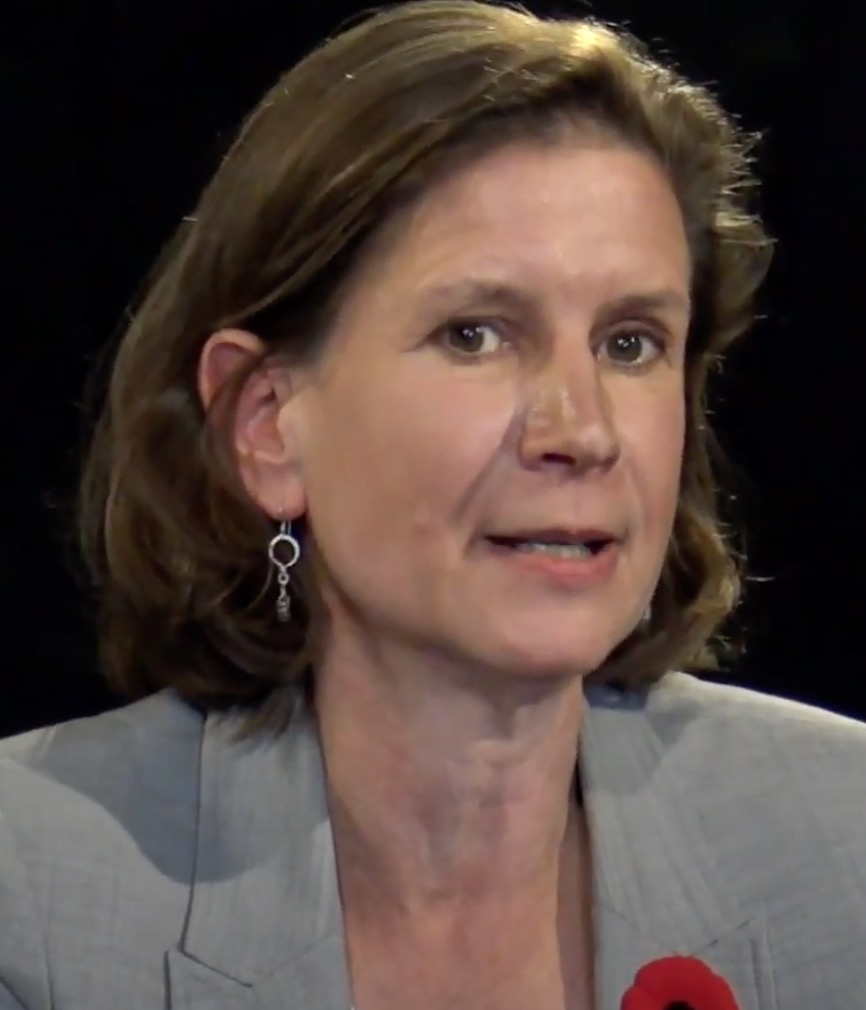
	Majority party	Minority party	Third party
Leader	Blaine Higgs	Brian Gallant	Kris Austin
Party	Progressive Conservative	Liberal	People's Alliance
Leader since	October 22, 2016	October 27, 2012	June 5, 2010
Leader's seat	Quispamsis	Shediac Bay-Dieppe	Fredericton-Grand Lake
Last election	21 seats, 34.64%	27 seats, 42.72%	0 seats, 2.14%
Seats before	21	24	0
Seats won	22	21	3
Seat change	▲1	▼3	▲3
Popular vote	121,300	143,791	47,860
Percentage	31.89%	37.80%	12.58%
Swing	▼2.75pp	▼4.92pp	▲10.44pp
	Fourth party	Fifth party
Leader	David Coon	Jennifer McKenzie
Party	Green	New Democratic
Leader since	September 22, 2012	August 10, 2017
Leader's seat	Fredericton South	Ran in Saint John Harbour (lost)
Last election	1 seat, 6.61%	0 seats, 12.98%
Seats before	1	0
Seats won	3	0
Seat change	▲2	Steady
Popular vote	45,186	19,039
Percentage	11.88%	5.00%
Swing	▲5.27pp	▼7.98pp
- Popular vote by riding. As this is an FPTP election, seat totals are not determined by popular vote, but instead via results by each riding.
Premier before election
Brian Gallant
Liberal
Premier after election
Brian Gallant (Note: Following the election, Brian Gallant continued in office with a minority government. On November 1, 2018, Gallant's government was defeated in a confidence vote, prompting his resignation. Lieutenant Governor Jocelyne Roy-Vienneau then invited Progressive Conservative leader Blaine Higgs to form a minority government. Gallant's resignation was effective November 9, 2018, at which time Higgs was sworn in as premier.)
Liberal

The 2018 New Brunswick general election was held on September 24, 2018, to elect the 49 members of the 59th New Brunswick Legislature, the governing house of the province of New Brunswick, Canada.

Two smaller parties — the People's Alliance and the Greens — made breakthroughs, winning three seats each, and potentially holding the balance of power. The People's Alliance entered the legislature for the first time, while the Greens increased their seat count from one. This marked the first time since the 1991 election that four parties won representation in the legislature. The election was also contested by the provincial New Democrats, newcomers KISS NB, and eight independents.

This is the first election since 1920 that did not return a majority for any party. The Progressive Conservatives won the most seats, with 22, but incumbent Liberal Premier Brian Gallant, whose party secured only 21 seats despite winning the popular vote by six percentage points, indicated that he would seek the confidence of the legislature and attempt to form a minority government.

On September 25, Gallant met with the Lieutenant Governor Jocelyne Roy-Vienneau and received permission to continue in office. On November 2, Gallant's minority government was defeated in a non-confidence vote. On November 9, Progressive Conservative leader Blaine Higgs was sworn in as premier with a minority government.

== Timeline ==
- September 22, 2014 – The New Brunswick Liberal Association, led by Brian Gallant, won a narrow majority government, defeating incumbent Premier David Alward's Progressive Conservatives, which became the second single-term government in New Brunswick's history.
- September 23, 2014 - Alward announces his resignation as Progressive Conservative leader.
- October 18, 2014 - Bruce Fitch became interim leader of the Progressive Conservative Party.
- December 10, 2014 - The NDP executive rejects Cardy's resignation as leader, urging him to continue and offering him a salary as he has been working as leader on a volunteer basis.
- October 22, 2016 - Blaine Higgs becomes the leader of the Progressive Conservative Party in a leadership election.
- January 1, 2017 - Dominic Cardy resigns as leader of the NDP, and as a party member. He subsequently joins the PCs as Chief of Staff to Leader Blaine Higgs.
- January 8, 2017 - Rosaire L'Italien is chosen as interim leader of the NDP by the party's executive.
- August 10, 2017 - Jennifer McKenzie is acclaimed as the new leader of the NDP.

=== Summary of seat changes ===
Changes in seats held (2014–2018)
Seat	Before				Change		
Seat	Date	Member	Party	Reason	Date	Member	Party
Saint John East	October 14, 2014	Gary Keating	█ Liberal	Resignation	November 17, 2014	Glen Savoie (Note: NDP leader Dominic Cardy came in third)	█ PC
Carleton	May 22, 2015	David Alward	█ PC	Resignation	October 5, 2015	Stewart Fairgrieve	█ PC
Campbellton-Dalhousie	November 30, 2017	Donald Arseneault	█ Liberal	Resignation			
Moncton Centre	May 10, 2018	Chris Collins	█ Liberal	Left the party			█ Independent
Edmundston-Madawaska Centre	July 6, 2018	Madeleine Dubé	█ PC	Resignation			

== Results ==
Summary of the 2018 Legislative Assembly of New Brunswick election
Party	Leader	Candidates	Votes				Seats		
Party	Leader	Candidates	#	±	%	Change (pp)	2014	2018	±
Liberal	Brian Gallant	49	143,791	15,057▼	37.80	-4.93	27	21 / 49	6▼
Progressive Conservative	Blaine Higgs	49	121,300	7,501▼	31.89	-2.76	21	22 / 49	1▲
People's Alliance	Kris Austin	30	47,860	39,896▲	12.58	10.44	–	3 / 49	3▲
Green	David Coon	47	45,186	20,604▲	11.88	5.27	1	3 / 49	2▲
New Democratic	Jennifer McKenzie	49	19,039	29,218▼	5.01	-7.98			
Independent		8	2,821	472▼	0.74	-0.14			
KISS	Gerald Bourque	9	366	366▲	0.10	New			
Total		241	380,363		100.00%				
Rejected ballots			1,412	210▼					
Turnout			381,775	8,414▲	64.85%	0.20▲			
Registered voters			588,671	11,142▲					

=== Synopsis of results ===
2018 New Brunswick general election - synopsis of riding results
Riding	Winning party							Turnout	Votes							
Riding	2014	1st place	Votes	Share	Margin #	Margin %	2nd place	Turnout	Lib	PC	NDP	Green	PA	KISS	Ind	Total
Albert	PC	PC	3,479	42.78%	1,704	20.95%	Lib	64.6%	1,775	3,479	375	870	1,546	–	87	8,132
Bathurst East-Nepisiguit-Saint-Isidore	Lib	Lib	3,550	51.79%	1,524	22.23%	NDP	63.5%	3,550	858	2,026	421	–	–	–	6,855
Bathurst West-Beresford	Lib	Lib	4,351	67.53%	3,269	50.74%	PC	59.1%	4,351	1,082	443	503	–	64	–	6,443
Campbellton-Dalhousie	Lib	Lib	3,720	50.29%	1,959	26.48%	PC	66.9%	3,720	1,761	721	637	558	–	–	7,397
Caraquet	Lib	Lib	5,420	63.78%	3,593	42.28%	PC	77.1%	5,420	1,827	548	330	–	–	373	8,498
Carleton	PC	PC	2,982	39.58%	956	12.69%	PA	66.6%	1,197	2,982	82	1,247	2,026	–	–	7,534
Carleton-Victoria	Lib	Lib	3,116	40.88%	244	3.20%	PC	65.6%	3,116	2,872	114	503	960	58	–	7,623
Carleton-York	PC	PC	3,118	37.17%	535	6.38%	PA	68.6%	1,556	3,118	255	837	2,583	40	–	8,389
Dieppe	Lib	Lib	5,173	71.57%	4,116	56.95%	NDP	65.0%	5,173	998	1,057	–	–	–	–	7,228
Edmundston-Madawaska Centre	PC	Lib	4,668	66.56%	3,231	46.07%	PC	62.7%	4,668	1,437	206	702	–	–	–	7,013
Fredericton North	Lib	Lib	2,443	31.61%	261	3.38%	PC	66.5%	2,443	2,182	139	1,313	1,651	–	–	7,728
Fredericton South	Green	Green	4,273	56.31%	2,748	36.22%	Lib	68.2%	1,525	1,042	132	4,273	616	–	–	7,588
Fredericton West-Hanwell	PC	PC	2,739	31.82%	335	3.89%	Lib	69.1%	2,404	2,739	171	1,490	1,803	–	–	8,607
Fredericton-Grand Lake	PC	PA	4,799	54.58%	2,366	26.91%	PC	74.1%	955	2,433	114	472	4,799	19	–	8,792
Fredericton-York	PC	PA	3,033	33.73%	256	2.85%	PC	71.0%	1,652	2,777	103	1,393	3,033	34	–	8,992
Fundy-The Isles-Saint John West	Lib	PC	3,808	47.56%	1,386	17.31%	Lib	69.3%	2,422	3,808	203	469	1,104	–	–	8,006
Gagetown-Petitcodiac	PC	PC	3,674	45.71%	1,782	22.17%	PA	67.9%	1,153	3,674	165	1,097	1,892	56	–	8,037
Hampton	PC	PC	3,702	49.17%	2,248	29.86%	Lib	63.7%	1,454	3,702	384	743	1,246	–	–	7,529
Kent North	Lib	Green	4,056	45.91%	755	8.55%	Lib	72.1%	3,301	1,112	171	4,056	–	–	194	8,834
Kent South	Lib	Lib	5,595	60.93%	3,747	40.80%	PC	73.7%	5,595	1,848	436	1,304	–	–	–	9,183
Kings Centre	PC	PC	3,267	43.11%	1,482	19.55%	Lib	66.0%	1,785	3,267	342	731	1,454	–	–	7,579
Madawaska Les Lacs-Edmundston	Lib	Lib	4,191	58.88%	2,365	33.23%	PC	62.7%	4,191	1,826	156	945	–	–	–	7,118
Memramcook-Tantramar	Lib	Green	3,148	38.33%	11	0.13%	Lib	69.3%	3,137	1,518	410	3,148	–	–	–	8,213
Miramichi	Lib	PA	3,788	46.96%	963	11.94%	Lib	72.5%	2,825	1,154	110	189	3,788	–	–	8,066
Miramichi Bay-Neguac	Lib	Lib	3,512	41.97%	1,465	17.51%	PA	70.2%	3,512	1,741	718	349	2,047	–	–	8,367
Moncton Centre	Lib	Lib	2,698	43.59%	1,498	24.20%	Ind	58.2%	2,698	982	229	771	309	–	1,200	6,189
Moncton East	Lib	Lib	3,626	46.81%	855	11.04%	PC	62.9%	3,626	2,771	424	925	–	–	–	7,746
Moncton Northwest	PC	PC	3,186	41.07%	223	2.87%	Lib	62.2%	2,963	3,186	297	437	875	–	–	7,758
Moncton South	Lib	Lib	3,099	47.44%	1,009	15.45%	PC	58.0%	3,099	2,090	249	628	466	–	–	6,532
Moncton Southwest	PC	PC	2,920	41.73%	253	3.62%	Lib	58.0%	2,667	2,920	503	907	–	–	–	6,997
New Maryland-Sunbury	PC	PC	3,844	41.21%	1,630	17.48%	PA	70.4%	2,210	3,844	143	902	2,214	14	–	9,327
Oromocto-Lincoln-Fredericton	PC	PC	2,399	31.95%	93	1.24%	Lib	62.8%	2,306	2,399	159	903	1,741	–	–	7,508
Portland-Simonds	PC	PC	3,168	53.28%	1,465	24.64%	Lib	53.8%	1,703	3,168	449	435	–	–	191	5,946
Quispamsis	PC	PC	4,691	56.87%	2,613	31.68%	Lib	68.2%	2,078	4,691	239	445	795	–	–	8,248
Restigouche West	Lib	Lib	4,233	52.53%	1,693	21.01%	Green	69.4%	4,233	961	263	2,540	–	62	–	8,059
Restigouche-Chaleur	Lib	Lib	4,430	66.04%	3,599	53.65%	Green	60.3%	4,430	826	621	831	–	–	–	6,708
Riverview	PC	PC	3,701	49.02%	1,648	21.83%	Lib	64.0%	2,053	3,701	249	542	1,005	–	–	7,550
Rothesay	PC	PC	3,542	49.98%	1,541	21.74%	Lib	63.5%	2,001	3,542	251	571	722	–	–	7,087
Saint Croix	Lib	PC	3,249	39.21%	813	9.81%	Lib	68.2%	2,436	3,249	89	1,047	1,466	–	–	8,287
Saint John East	Lib	PC	3,017	45.62%	1,242	18.78%	Lib	58.4%	1,775	3,017	402	373	1,047	–	–	6,614
Saint John Harbour	Lib	Lib	1,865	32.89%	10	0.18%	PC	53.1%	1,865	1,855	836	721	393	–	–	5,670
Saint John Lancaster	PC	PC	3,001	45.15%	1,274	19.17%	Lib	62.7%	1,727	3,001	414	582	922	–	–	6,646
Shediac Bay-Dieppe	Lib	Lib	6,162	67.09%	4,809	52.36%	PC	68.1%	6,162	1,353	764	906	–	–	–	9,185
Shediac-Beaubassin-Cap-Pelé	Lib	Lib	5,919	63.54%	3,838	41.20%	PC	72.0%	5,919	2,081	428	888	–	–	–	9,316
Shippagan-Lamèque-Miscou	Lib	PC	4,048	46.25%	99	1.13%	Lib	79.2%	3,949	4,048	578	–	–	–	178	8,753
Southwest Miramichi-Bay du Vin	PC	PC	2,960	35.42%	35	0.42%	PA	74.1%	1,909	2,960	97	447	2,925	19	–	8,357
Sussex-Fundy-St. Martins	PC	PC	3,816	49.46%	1,942	25.17%	PA	64.0%	1,212	3,816	254	505	1,874	–	54	7,715
Tracadie-Sheila	Lib	Lib	4,320	48.77%	1,930	21.79%	PC	74.2%	4,320	2,390	1,213	390	–	–	544	8,857
Victoria-La Vallée	Lib	Lib	3,570	47.24%	358	4.74%	PC	66.6%	3,570	3,212	307	468	–	–	–	7,557

= Open seat
= Turnout is above provincial average
= Winning candidate was in previous Legislature
= Incumbent had switched allegiance
= Previously incumbent in another riding
= Not incumbent; was previously elected to the Legislature
= Incumbency arose from byelection gain
= Other incumbents renominated
= Previously an MP in the House of Commons of Canada
= Multiple candidates

=== Detailed analysis ===
Position attained in seats contested
Party	Seats	Second	Third	Fourth
Liberal	21	20	7	1
Progressive Conservative	22	17	10	–
Green	3	2	11	27
People's Alliance	3	7	15	2
New Democratic	–	2	6	14
Independent	–	1 (Note: Chris Collins (Moncton Centre))	–	4

Principal races, according to 1st and 2nd-place results
Parties		Seats
█ Liberal	█ Progressive Conservative	31
█ Liberal	█ Green	5
█ Liberal	█ People's Alliance	2
█ Liberal	█ New Democratic	2
█ Liberal	█ Independent	1
█ Progressive Conservative	█ People's Alliance	8
Total		49

== Aftermath ==
On election night, Higgs claimed victory, saying his team had received a mandate; however, Gallant did not resign, instead stating his intent to remain in office by securing support on a vote-by-vote basis. The following day, Gallant met with Lieutenant Governor Jocelyne Roy-Vienneau and received permission to continue in office and attempt to seek confidence of the legislature. On September 27, Higgs met with Roy-Vienneau, and was told that if Gallant was unable to secure the confidence of the House, he would be called on to form government; shortly afterwards, Higgs called on Gallant to either resign or immediately recall the legislature.

In the immediate aftermath of the election, both Kris Austin of the People's Alliance and David Coon of the Green Party were noncommittal in their support: Austin pledged to work with any party willing to work with him, but said the party won't sacrifice its "values and ideals" to do so; while Coon said his caucus would take time to figure out how they would align themselves, but would not be able to work with anyone uncommitted to rights for linguistic minorities or combatting climate change. Gallant opted to pursue a partnership with the Green Party, ruling out any arrangement with the PCs or PA because they don't share Liberal "values". Higgs initially ruled out any formal agreements with other parties, but later said that a four-year agreement would be ideal for stability—pointing to the confidence and supply deal that the British Columbia NDP and Greens negotiated following the province's inconclusive 2017 election as an example.

Austin agreed to support to a Progressive Conservative government for 18 months, though no formal agreement was made. Coon said his party would negotiate with both the Liberals and Progressive Conservatives. On October 10, Coon announced that the Green Party would not formally side with either party, and would base their votes on their own "declaration of intent". Accordingly, Coon said that their support for the throne speech depends on its "merits", and that his caucus would be free to vote their own way on the speech.

The results drew notice elsewhere in Canada. Parti Québécois leader Jean-François Lisée described the results as "an advertisement for our proposal for proportional representation." Andrew Weaver, leader of the BC Greens, suggested that Coon should make an agreement with the Progressive Conservatives. The Globe and Mail published an editorial calling for electoral reform, as did National Post columnist Andrew Coyne.

On November 1, Gallant's Liberal minority government was defeated by a non-confidence vote (25–23) by the opposition Progressive Conservatives and People's Alliance. On November 9, Blaine Higgs was sworn in as premier.

== Opinion polls ==
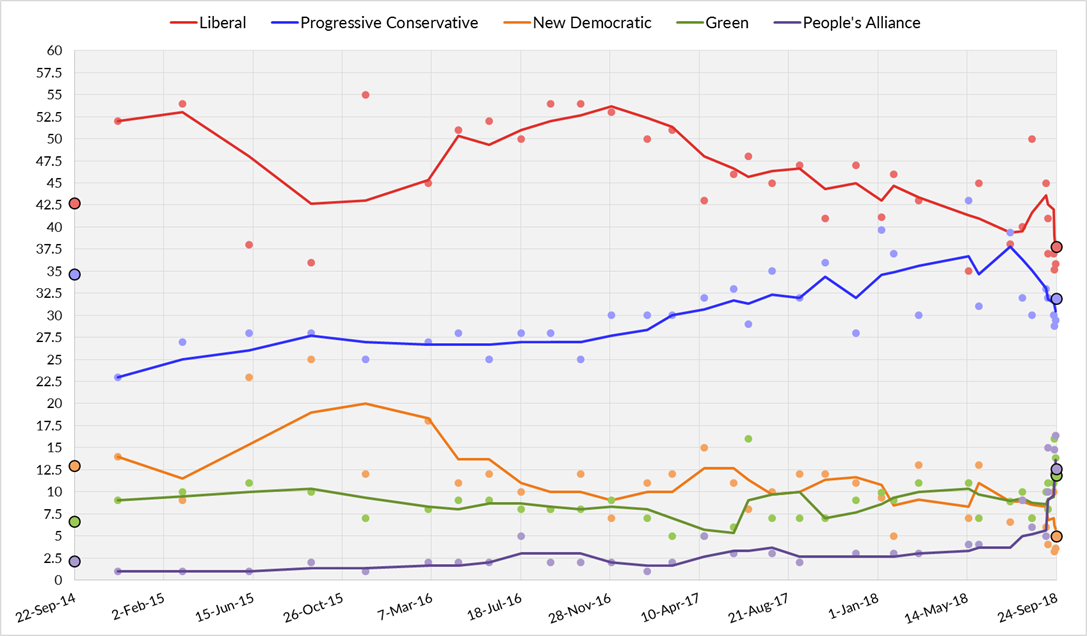

Polling Firm	Last Day of Polling	Link	Liberal	PC	NDP	Green	PA
Forum Research	September 23, 2018		35.8	29.4	3.6	13.8	16.4
Mainstreet Research	September 21, 2018		35.2	28.8	3.2	16.0	14.8
Nanos Research	September 20, 2018		37.4	30.2	9.6	10.8	12.0
Forum Research	September 11, 2018		37	32	4	11	15
Leger Research	September 11, 2018		41	32	8	8	10
Corporate Research Associates	September 9, 2018		45	33	6	10	5
Corporate Research Associates	August 19, 2018		50	30	7	7	6
MQO Research	August 4, 2018		40	32	9	10	
Mainstreet Research	July 17, 2018		38.1	39.4	6.6	8.9	
Corporate Research Associates	May 31, 2018		45	31	13	7	4
MQO Research	May 16, 2018		35	43	7	11	4
Corporate Research Associates	March 3, 2018		43	30	13	11	3
MQO Research	January 25, 2018		46	37	5	9	3
Mainstreet Research	January 6, 2018		41.1	39.7	9.3	9.9	
Corporate Research Associates	November 29, 2017		47	28	11	9	3
MQO Research	October 15, 2017		41	36	12	7	
Corporate Research Associates	September 6, 2017		47	32	12	7	2
MQO Research	July 27, 2017		45	35	10	7	3
Mainstreet Research	June 22, 2017		48	29	8	16	0
Corporate Research Associates	May 31, 2017		46	33	11	6	3
MQO Research	April 17, 2017		43	32	15	5	5
Corporate Research Associates	March 1, 2017		51	30	12	5	2
MQO Research	January 22, 2017		50	30	11	7	1
Corporate Research Associates	November 30, 2016		53	30	7	9	2
MQO Research	October 15, 2016		54	25	12	8	2
Corporate Research Associates	August 31, 2016		54	28	8	8	2
MQO Research	July 19, 2016		50	28	10	8	5
Corporate Research Associates	June 1, 2016		52	25	12	9	2
MQO Research	April 16, 2016		51	28	11	9	2
Corporate Research Associates	March 2, 2016		45	27	18	8	2
Corporate Research Associates	November 30, 2015		55	25	12	7	1
Corporate Research Associates	September 10, 2015		36	28	25	10	2
Corporate Research Associates	June 9, 2015		38	28	23	11	1
Corporate Research Associates	March 2, 2015		54	27	9	10	1
Corporate Research Associates	November 26, 2014		52	23	14	9	1
Election 2014	September 22, 2014	HTML	42.72	34.64	12.98	6.61	2.14

== Candidates by region ==
Legend

- **bold** denotes cabinet minister, speaker or party leader
- italics denotes a potential candidate who has not received his/her party's nomination
- † denotes an incumbent who is not running for re-election or was defeated in nomination contest
- * denotes an incumbent seeking re-election in a new district

NOTE: Candidates' names are as registered with Elections New Brunswick

=== Northern ===
Electoral district	Candidates						Incumbent
Electoral district	Liberal	Progressive Conservatives	Green	NDP	PANB	Other	Incumbent
Restigouche West	**Gilles LePage**; 4233	David Moreau; 961	Charles Thériault; 2540	Beverly A. Mann; 263		Travis Pollock (KISS); 62	**Gilles LePage**
Campbellton-Dalhousie	Guy Arseneault; 3720	Diane Cyr; 1761	Annie Thériault; 637	Thérèse Tremblay; 721	Robert Boudreau; 558		Vacant
Restigouche-Chaleur	Daniel Guitard; 4430	Charles Stewart; 826	Mario Comeau; 831	Paul Tremblay; 621			Daniel Guitard
Bathurst West-Beresford	**Brian Kenny**; 4351	Yvon Landry; 1082	Mike Rau; 503	Anne-Renée Thomas; 443		James Risdon (KISS); 64	**Brian Kenny**
Bathurst East-Nepisiguit-Saint-Isidore	**Denis Landry**; 3550	Michelle Branch; 858	Robert Kryszko; 421	Jean Maurice Landry; 2026			**Denis Landry**
Caraquet	Isabelle Thériault; 5420	Kevin Haché; 1827	Yvon Durelle; 330	Katy Casavant; 548		Guilmond Hébert (Ind.); 373	Hédard Albert†
Shippagan-Lamèque-Miscou	**Wilfred Roussel**; 3949	Robert Gauvin; 4048		Albert Rousselle; 578		Philippe Tisseuil (Ind.); 178	**Wilfred Roussel**
Tracadie-Sheila	Keith Chiasson; 4320	Claude Landry; 2390	Nancy Benoit; 390	Francis Duguay; 1213		Stéphane Richardson (Ind.); 544	Serge Rousselle†

=== Miramichi ===
Electoral district	Candidates						Incumbent
Electoral district	Liberal	Progressive Conservatives	Green	NDP	PANB	KISS	Incumbent
Miramichi Bay-Neguac	**Lisa Harris**; 3512	Debi Tozer; 1741	James (Junior) Denny; 349	Willie Robichaud; 718	Terry Collette; 2047		**Lisa Harris**
Miramichi	**Bill Fraser**; 2825	Peggy McLean; 1154	Louann Savage; 189	Douglas Mullin; 110	Michelle Conroy; 3788		**Bill Fraser**
Southwest Miramichi-Bay du Vin	Andy Hardy; 1909	Jake Stewart; 2960	Byron J. Connors; 447	Roger Vautour; 97	Art O'Donnell; 2925	Dawson Brideau; 19	Jake Stewart

=== Southeastern ===
Electoral district	Candidates						Incumbent
Electoral district	Liberal	Progressive Conservatives	Green	NDP	PANB	Other	Incumbent
Kent North	Emery Comeau; 3301	Katie Robertson; 1112	Kevin Arseneau; 4056	Neil Gardner; 171		Roger Richard (Ind.); 194	Bertrand LeBlanc†
Kent South	Benoit Bourque; 5595	Ricky Gautreau; 1848	Alain Rousselle; 1304	Serge Rémi Parent; 436			**Benoît Bourque**
Shediac Bay-Dieppe	**Brian Gallant**; 6162	Paulin Blaise Ngweth; 1353	Michel Albert; 906	Michel Boudreau; 764			**Brian Gallant**
Shediac-Beaubassin-Cap-Pelé	Jacques LeBlanc; 5919	Marcel Doiron; 2081	Greta Doucet; 888	Lise Potvin; 428			Victor Boudreau†
Memramcook-Tantramar	Bernard LeBlanc; 3137	Etienne Gaudet; 1518	Megan Mitton; 3148	Hélène Boudreau; 410			Bernard LeBlanc
Dieppe	**Roger Melanson**; 5173	Pierre Brine; 998		Joyce Richardson; 1057			**Roger Melanson**
Moncton East	Monique LeBlanc; 3626	Marty Kingston; 2771	Matthew Ian Clark; 925	Anthony Crandall; 424			Monique LeBlanc
Moncton Centre	Rob McKee; 2698	Claudette Boudreau-Turner; 982	Jean-Marie Nadeau; 771	Jessica Caissie; 229	Kevin McClure; 309	Chris Collins (Ind.); 1200	**Chris Collins**
Moncton South	**Cathy Rogers**; 3099	Moira Murphy; 2090	Laura Sanderson; 628	Amy Johnson; 249	Marilyn Crossman-Riel; 466		**Cathy Rogers**
Moncton Northwest	Courtney Pringle-Carver; 2963	Ernie Steeves; 3186	Keagan Slupsky; 437	Cyprien Okana; 297	Myrna Geldart; 875		Ernie Steeves
Moncton Southwest	Susy Campos; 2667	Sherry Wilson; 2920	Sarah Colwell; 907	Hailey Duffy; 503			Sherry Wilson
Riverview	Brent Mazerolle; 2053	R. Bruce Fitch; 3701	Stephanie Coburn; 542	Madison Duffy; 249	Heather Collins; 1005		Bruce Fitch
Albert	Catherine Black; 1775	Mike Holland; 3479	Moranda van Geest; 870	Betty Weir; 375	Sharon Buchanan; 1546	James Wilson (Ind.); 87	Brian Keirstead†
Gagetown-Petitcodiac	Brigitte Noel; 1153	Ross Wetmore; 3674	Marilyn Merritt-Gray; 1097	Anne Marie F. Richardson; 165	Craig Dykeman; 1892	Carolyn MacDonald (KISS); 56	Ross Wetmore

=== Southern ===
Electoral district	Candidates						Incumbent
Electoral district	Liberal	Progressive Conservatives	Green	NDP	PANB	Independent	Incumbent
Sussex-Fundy-St. Martins	Ian Smyth; 1212	Bruce N. Northrup; 3816	Fred Harrison; 505	Dawna Robertson; 254	Jim Bedford; 1874	David Raymond Amos; 54	Bruce Northrup
Hampton	Carley Parish; 1454	Gary Crossman; 3702	John Sabine; 743	Layton Peck; 384	Dana Hansen; 1246		Gary Crossman
Quispamsis	Aaron Kennedy; 2078	**Blaine Higgs**; 4691	Mark Woolsey; 445	Ryan Jewkes; 239	Keith Porter; 795		**Blaine Higgs**
Rothesay	Stephanie Tomilson; 2001	Hugh J. (Ted) Flemming; 3542	Ann McAllister; 571	Josh Floyd; 251	Michael Griffin; 722		Ted Flemming
Saint John East	Clare Manzer; 1775	Glen Savoie; 3017	Lynaya Astephen; 373	Alex White; 402	Matthew Thompson; 1047		Glen Savoie
Portland-Simonds	John MacKenzie; 1703	Trevor A. Holder; 3168	Sheila Croteau; 435	Kim Blue; 449		Artie Watson; 191	Trevor Holder
Saint John Harbour	Gerry Lowe; 1865	Barry Ogden; 1855	Wayne Dryer; 721	**Jennifer McKenzie**; 836	Margot Brideau; 393		Ed Doherty†
Saint John Lancaster	Kathleen Riley-Karamanos; 1727	Dorothy Shephard; 3001	Doug James; 582	Tony Mowery; 414	Paul Seelye; 922		Dorothy Shephard
Kings Centre	Bill Merrifield; 1785	Bill Oliver; 3267	Bruce Dryer; 731	Susan Jane Shedd; 342	Dave Peters; 1454		Bill Oliver
Fundy-The Isles-Saint John West	**Rick Doucet**; 2422	Andrea Anderson-Mason; 3808	Romey Frances Heuff; 469	Keith LeBlanc; 203	Doug Ellis; 1104		**Rick Doucet**
Saint Croix	**John B. Ames**; 2436	Greg Thompson; 3249	Donna Linton; 1047	Jan Underhill; 89	Joyce Wright; 1466		**John Ames**

=== Capital Region ===
Electoral district	Candidates						Incumbent
Electoral district	Liberal	Progressive Conservatives	Green	NDP	PANB	KISS	Incumbent
Oromocto-Lincoln-Fredericton	John Fife; 2306	Mary E. Wilson; 2399	Tom McLean; 903	Justin Young; 159	Craig Rector; 1741		Jody Carr†
Fredericton-Grand Lake	Wendy Tremblay; 955	Pam Lynch; 2433	Dan Weston; 472	Glenna Hanley; 114	**Kris Austin**; 4799	**Gerald Bourque**; 19	Pam Lynch
New Maryland-Sunbury	Alex Scholten; 2210	Jeff Carr; 3844	Jenica Atwin; 902	Mackenzie Thomason; 143	Morris Shannon; 2214	Danelle Titus; 14	Jeff Carr
Fredericton South	Susan Holt; 1525	Scott Smith; 1042	**David Coon**; 4273	Chris Durrant; 132	Bonnie Clark; 616		**David Coon**
Fredericton North	**Stephen Horsman**; 2443	Jill Green; 2182	Tamara White; 1313	Scarlett Tays; 139	Lynn King; 1651		**Stephen Horsman**
Fredericton-York	Amber Bishop; 1652	Kirk Douglas MacDonald; 2777	Amanda Wildeman; 1393	Evelyne Godfrey; 103	Rick DeSaulniers; 3033	Sandra Bourque; 34	Kirk MacDonald
Fredericton West-Hanwell	Cindy Miles; 2404	Dominic Cardy; 2739	Susan Jonah; 1490	Olivier Hébert; 171	Jason Paull; 1803		Brian Macdonald†
Carleton-York	Jackie Morehouse; 1556	Carl Urquhart; 3118	Sue Rickards; 837	Robert Kitchen; 255	Gary Lemmon; 2583	Lloyd Maurey; 40	Carl Urquhart

=== Upper River Valley ===
Electoral district	Candidates						Incumbent
Electoral district	Liberal	Progressive Conservatives	Green	NDP	PANB	KISS	Incumbent
Carleton	Christy Culberson; 1197	Stewart Fairgrieve; 2982	Amy Anderson; 1247	Adam McAvoy; 82	Stewart B. Manuel; 2026		Stewart Fairgrieve
Carleton-Victoria	**Andrew Harvey**; 3116	Margaret C. Johnson; 2872	Paula Shaw; 503	Margaret Geldart; 114	Terry Leigh Sisson; 960	Carter Edgar; 58	**Andrew Harvey**
Victoria-La Vallée	Chuck Chiasson; 3570	Danny Soucy; 3212	Paul Plourde; 468	Lina Chiasson; 307			Chuck Chiasson
Edmundston-Madawaska Centre	Jean-Claude (JC) D'Amours; 4668	Gérald Levesque; 1437	Sophie Vaillancourt; 702	Anne-Marie Comeau; 206			Vacant
Madawaska Les Lacs-Edmundston	**Francine Landry**; 4191	Jeannot Volpé; 1826	Denis Boulet; 945	Cécile Richard-Hébert; 156			**Francine Landry**
