= 57th New Brunswick Legislature =

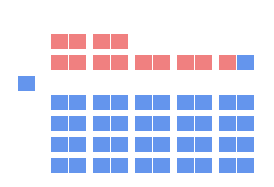
Rendition of party representation in the 57th New Brunswick Legislative Assembly, if it sat immediately after the 2010 election. Progressive Conservatives (42) Liberals (13)

The 57th New Brunswick Legislative Assembly was created following a general election in 2010. Its members were sworn in on October 12, 2010, it held its first meeting October 27, 2010, to elect a speaker, and it was officially opened on November 23, 2010, with a speech from the throne. It was dissolved on Thursday, August 21, 2014, with an election called for September 22, 2014.

== Leadership ==
Dale Graham was elected speaker on October 27, 2010.

David Alward was the Premier of New Brunswick. The government house leader was Paul Robichaud.

The parliamentary opposition was provided by Liberals leader Brian Gallant. The opposition house leader was Bill Fraser.

== Members ==
All of the current members were elected at the general election on September 27, 2010.

Name	Party	Riding	First elected / previously elected
Wayne Steeves	Progressive Conservative	Albert	1999 g.e.
Brian Kenny	Liberal	Bathurst	2003 g.e.
Greg Davis	Progressive Conservative	Campbellton-Restigouche Centre	2010 g.e.
Hédard Albert	Liberal	Caraquet	2003 g.e.
Dale Graham	Progressive Conservative	Carleton	1993 by-e.
Denis Landry	Liberal	Centre-Péninsule-Saint-Sauveur	1995 g.e. 2003 g.e.
Curtis Malloch	Progressive Conservative	Charlotte-Campobello	2010 g.e.
Rick Doucet	Liberal	Charlotte-The Isles	2003 g.e.
Donald Arseneault	Liberal	Dalhousie-Restigouche East	2003 g.e.
Roger Melanson	Liberal	Dieppe Centre-Lewisville	2010 g.e.
Madeleine Dubé	Progressive Conservative	Edmundston-Saint-Basile	1999 g.e.
Pam Lynch	Progressive Conservative	Fredericton-Fort Nashwaak	2010 g.e.
Craig Leonard	Progressive Conservative	Fredericton-Lincoln	2010 g.e.
Troy Lifford	Progressive Conservative	Fredericton-Nashwaaksis	2010 g.e.
Brian Macdonald	Progressive Conservative	Fredericton-Silverwood	2010 g.e.
Jim Parrott	Progressive Conservative	Fundy-River Valley	2010 g.e.
Jim Parrott	Independent	Fundy-River Valley	2010 g.e.
Jim Parrott	Progressive Conservative	Fundy-River Valley	2010 g.e.
Danny Soucy	Progressive Conservative	Grand Falls-Drummond-Saint-André	2010 g.e.
Ross Wetmore	Progressive Conservative	Grand Lake-Gagetown	2010 g.e.
Bev Harrison	Progressive Conservative	Hampton-Kings	1978 g.e. (Note: Saint John-Fundy); 1999 g.e.
Shawn Graham (until March 11, 2013)	Liberal	Kent	1998 by-e.
Brian Gallant	Liberal	Kent	2013 by-e.
Claude Williams	Progressive Conservative	Kent South	2001 by-e.
Bruce Northrup	Progressive Conservative	Kings East	2006 g.e.
Paul Robichaud	Progressive Conservative	Lamèque-Shippagan-Miscou	1999 g.e.
Yvon Bonenfant	Progressive Conservative	Madawaska-les-Lacs	2010 g.e.
Bernard LeBlanc	Liberal	Memramcook-Lakeville-Dieppe	2006 g.e.
Bill Fraser	Liberal	Miramichi-Bay du Vin	2006 g.e.
Serge Robichaud	Progressive Conservative	Miramichi Bay-Neguac	2010 g.e.
Robert Trevors	Progressive Conservative	Miramichi Centre	2010 g.e.
John Betts	Progressive Conservative	Moncton Crescent	1999 g.e.
Chris Collins	Liberal	Moncton East	2007 by-e.
Marie-Claude Blais	Progressive Conservative	Moncton North	2010 g.e.
Susan Stultz	Progressive Conservative	Moncton West	2010 g.e.
Ryan Riordon	Progressive Conservative	Nepisiguit	2010 g.e.
Jack Carr	Progressive Conservative	New Maryland-Sunbury West	2008 by-e.
Roland Haché	Liberal	Nigadoo-Chaleur	1999 g.e.
Jody Carr	Progressive Conservative	Oromocto	1999 g.e.
Sherry Wilson	Progressive Conservative	Petitcodiac	2010 g.e.
Blaine Higgs	Progressive Conservative	Quispamsis	2010 g.e.
Martine Coulombe	Progressive Conservative	Restigouche-La-Vallée	2010 g.e.
Bruce Fitch	Progressive Conservative	Riverview	2003 g.e.
Bertrand LeBlanc	Liberal	Rogersville-Kouchibouguac	2010 g.e.
Margaret-Ann Blaney (until May 16, 2012)	Progressive Conservative	Rothesay	1999 g.e.
Ted Flemming	Progressive Conservative	Rothesay	2012 by-e.
Glen Tait	Progressive Conservative	Saint John East	2010 g.e.
Glen Savoie	Progressive Conservative	Saint John-Fundy	2010 g.e.
Carl Killen	Progressive Conservative	Saint John Harbour	2010 g.e.
Dorothy Shephard	Progressive Conservative	Saint John Lancaster	2010 g.e.
Trevor Holder	Progressive Conservative	Saint John Portland	1999 g.e.
Victor Boudreau	Liberal	Shediac-Cap-Pelé	2004 by-e.
Jake Stewart	Progressive Conservative	Southwest Miramichi	2010 g.e.
Mike Olscamp	Progressive Conservative	Tantramar	2006 g.e.
Claude Landry	Progressive Conservative	Tracadie-Sheila	2006 g.e.
Wes McLean	Progressive Conservative	Victoria-Tobique	2010 g.e.
David Alward	Progressive Conservative	Woodstock	1999 g.e.
Carl Urquhart	Progressive Conservative	York	2006 g.e.
Kirk MacDonald	Progressive Conservative	York North	1999 g.e.

=== Standings changes in the 57 Assembly ===
Number of members per party by date	2010	2012			2013		2014
Number of members per party by date	September 27	May 16	June 25	September 20	March 11	April 15	Dissolution
Progressive Conservative	42	41	42	41			
Liberal	13				12	13	
Independent	0			1			
Total members	55	54	55	55	54	55	
Vacant	0	1	0		1	0	
Government Majority	15	16	15	16	15	16	

Membership changes in the 57th Assembly
Date	Name	District	Party	Reason
September 27, 2010	See List of Members			Election day of the 2010 New Brunswick general election
May 16, 2012	Margaret-Ann Blaney	Rothesay	Progressive Conservative	Resigned seat
June 25, 2012	Ted Flemming	Rothesay	Progressive Conservative	Elected in a by-election
September 20, 2012	Jim Parrott	Fundy-River Valley	Independent	Kicked out of the Progressive Conservative caucus
March 11, 2013	Shawn Graham	Kent	Liberal	Resigned seat
April 15, 2013	Brian Gallant	Kent	Liberal	Elected in a by-election

== See also ==
- 2006 New Brunswick general election
- Legislative Assembly of New Brunswick

== Notes ==
Preceded by 56th Assembly	New Brunswick Legislative Assemblies; 2010–2014	Succeeded by 58th Assembly
