= Kris Austin =

Canadian politician (born 1979)

Kris Austin MLA
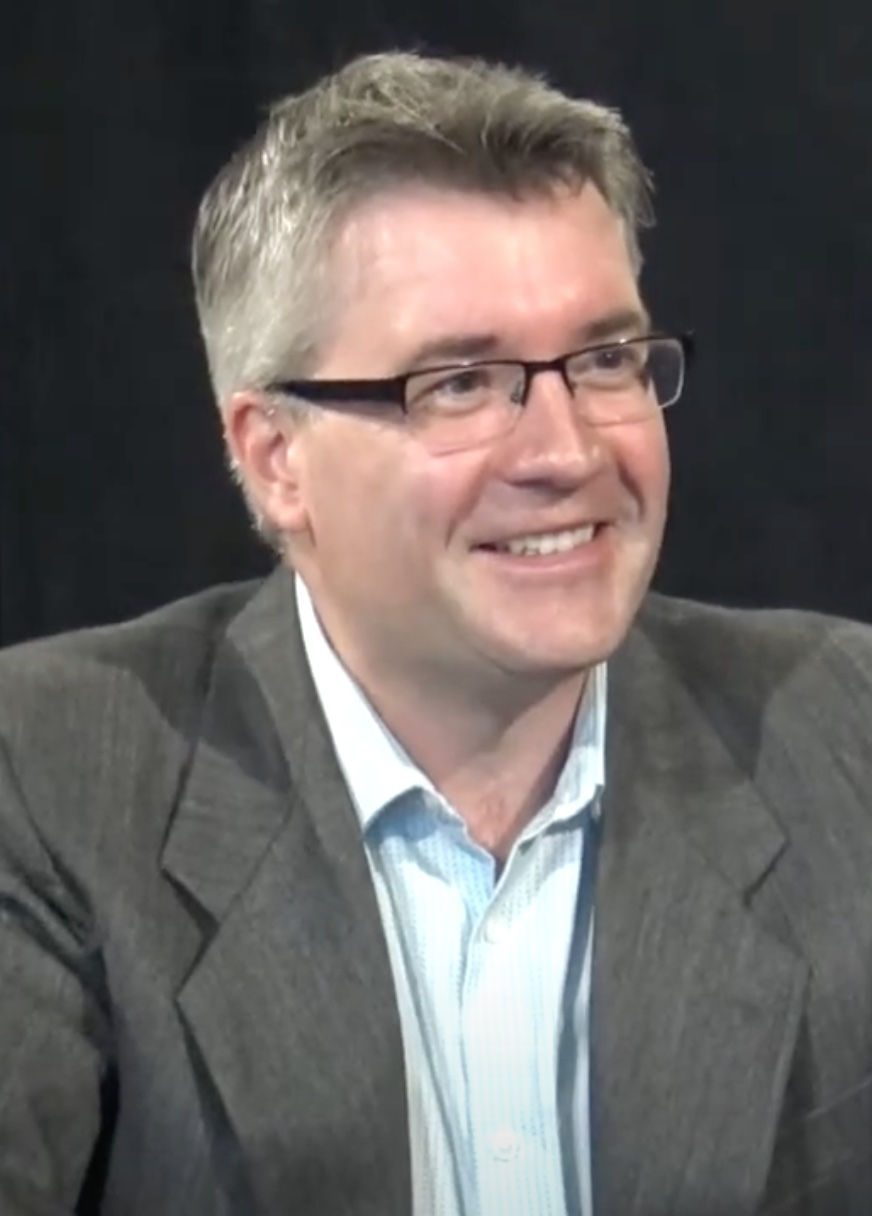
- Austin in 2020

Minister of Public Safety
- In office October 13, 2022 – November 2, 2024
- Premier: Blaine Higgs
- Preceded by: Bill Hogan
- Succeeded by: Robert Gauvin

Leader of the People's Alliance of New Brunswick
- In office June 5, 2010 – March 30, 2022
- Preceded by: Position established
- Succeeded by: Rick DeSaulniers

Member of the New Brunswick Legislative Assembly for Fredericton-Grand Lake
- Incumbent
- Assumed office September 24, 2018
- Preceded by: Pam Lynch

Personal details
- Born: 1979 (age 46–47) Hamilton, Ontario, Canada
- Party: Progressive Conservative
- Other political affiliations: People's Alliance of New Brunswick (2010–2022)
- Occupation: Minister

Kris Austin MLA (born 1979) is a Canadian politician who serves as an MLA in the Legislative Assembly of New Brunswick. Previously, he served as the leader of the People's Alliance of New Brunswick. On October 13, 2022, he was appointed minister of public safety and solicitor-general by Premier Blaine Higgs and served in that position until the Higgs government was defeated in the 2024 New Brunswick general election.

Austin led the People's Alliance into the 2010 provincial election and 2014 provincial elections in which the party won no seats. In the 2018 provincial election the party won three seats including Austin's riding of Fredericton-Grand Lake. He was re-elected in the 2020 provincial election in which his party lost one seat, electing two MLAs.

On March 30, 2022, Austin announced he will be leaving the People's Alliance of New Brunswick to join the Progressive Conservative Party of New Brunswick.

Austin is a Baptist minister and has worked in public relations.

Austin's appointment to provincial cabinet in the Higgs government was denounced by the Société de l’Acadie du Nouveau-Brunswick due to his opposition to Acadian rights and official bilingualism.

== Minister of Public Safety (2022–2024) ==
On October 13, 2022, Austin was appointed as the Minister of Public Safety following Dominic Cardy's resignation as the Minister of Education and Early Childhood Development, which caused Bill Hogan, the former public safety minister, to take his place.

In December 2023, Mayor Allan MacEachern of St. Stephen declared a state of emergency due to an increase in homelessness along with the recent death of a homeless person in the municipality. The provincial government was accused of failing to offer housing and social services as part of the declaration. The municipality has a population of just over 4,000, 70 of whom are homeless. Shortly following the state of emergency, Austin terminated it, calling it disappointing and likening it to car accidents by saying, “People die all the time in car accidents, and we do not declare state of emergencies for that.” He later reaffirmed this by emphasizing that the situation was not severe enough to constitute a state of emergency. The ensuing disagreement between Austin and MacEachern led to Austin proposing that St. Stephen provide shelter for the homeless, which MacEachern claimed to have already tried through a homelessness committee with council approval. However, according to MacEachern, the province later deemed the selected property unsuitable, resulting in a temporary halt to the project. Austin made additional comments in which he blamed Liberal policies for the homeless man's death, stating, "All of these issues that we're facing today is based on Trudeau policies, leftist agendas, that is degrading our society that we're seeing right across the country."

== Electoral record ==
2024 New Brunswick general election: Fredericton-Grand Lake
Party	Candidate	Votes	%	±%
Progressive Conservative	Kris Austin	4,456	54.0%	+22.7
Liberal	Kevin Dignam	2,277	27.6%	+18.4
Green	Ken Washburn	862	10.4%	-3.0
People's Alliance	Rick DeSaulniers	461	5.6%	-39.2
New Democratic	Arthur Taylor	195	2.4%	+1.4
Total valid votes		8,251		
Total rejected ballots				
Turnout				
Eligible voters				
Source: Elections New Brunswick

2020 New Brunswick general election
Party	Candidate	Votes	%	±%
People's Alliance	Kris Austin	3,759	46.42	-8.16
Progressive Conservative	Roy Wiggins	2,479	30.62	+2.95
Green	Ken Washburn	1,005	12.41	+7.04
Liberal	Eldon Hunter	749	9.25	-1.61
New Democratic	Greg Cook	87	1.07	-0.22
KISS	Grenville Woollacott	18	0.22	+0.01
Total valid votes		8,097	100.0	
Total rejected ballots		25	0.31	
Turnout		8,122	70.17	
Eligible voters		11,575		
People's Alliance hold		Swing		-5.56
Source: Elections New Brunswick

2018 New Brunswick general election: Fredericton-Grand Lake
Party	Candidate	Votes	%	±%
People's Alliance	Kris Austin	4,799	54.6%	+25.8
Progressive Conservative	Pam Lynch	2,433	27.7%	-1.1
Liberal	Wendy Tremblay	955	10.9%	-17.0
Green	Dan Weston	472	5.4%	+1.1
New Democratic	Glenna Hanley	114	1.3%	-9.2
KISS	Gerald Bourque	19	0.1%	New
Total valid votes		8,792	100.0	
Total rejected ballots		10		
Turnout		8,802	75.08%	
Eligible voters		11,724		
People's Alliance gain from Progressive Conservative		Swing		+13.5
Source: Elections New Brunswick

2014 New Brunswick general election: Fredericton-Grand Lake
Party	Candidate	Votes	%	±%
Progressive Conservative	Pam Lynch	2,403	28.79	
People's Alliance	Kris Austin	2,377	28.48	
Liberal	Sheri Shannon	2,330	27.91	
New Democratic	Bronwen Mosher	879	10.53	
Green	Dan Weston	358	4.29	
Total valid votes		8,347	100.0	
Total rejected ballots		16	0.19	
Turnout		8,363	70.66	
Eligible voters		11,835		
Voting results declared after judicial recount.
This riding was created from parts of Grand Lake-Gagetown and Fredericton-Fort Nashwaak, both elected a Progressive Conservative in the previous election. Pam Lynch was the incumbent from Fredericton-Fort Nashwaak.
Source: Elections New Brunswick

2010 New Brunswick general election: Grand Lake-Gagetown
Party	Candidate	Votes	%	±%
Progressive Conservative	Ross Wetmore	3,190	44.73	-0.89
Liberal	Barry Armstrong	2,118	29.70	-19.00
People's Alliance	Kris Austin	1,416	19.85	–
New Democratic	J.R. Magee	234	3.28	-2.40
Green	Sandra Burtt	174	2.44	–
Total valid votes		7,132	100.0	
Total rejected ballots		42	0.59	
Turnout		7,174	77.73	
Eligible voters		9,229		
Progressive Conservative gain from Liberal		Swing		+9.06
Source: Elections New Brunswick
