= Bill Hogan (politician) =

Canadian politician

Bill Hogan MLA
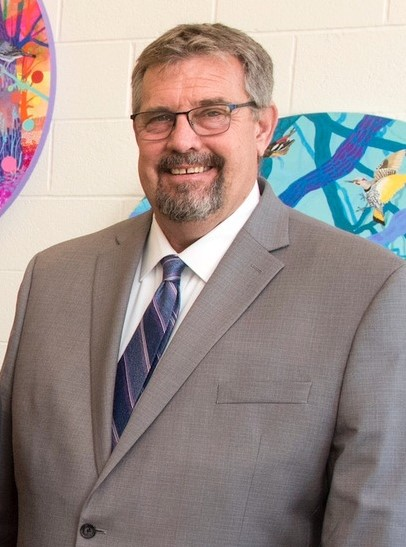
- Hogan in 2023

Minister of Education and Early Childhood Development
- In office October 13, 2022 – November 2, 2024
- Premier: Blaine Higgs
- Preceded by: Dominic Cardy
- Succeeded by: Claire Johnson

Minister of Public Safety
- In office February 23, 2021 – October 13, 2022
- Preceded by: Ted Flemming (Justice and Public Safety)
- Succeeded by: Kris Austin

Member of the New Brunswick Legislative Assembly for Carleton
- Incumbent
- Assumed office September 14, 2020
- Preceded by: Stewart Fairgrieve

Personal details
- Born: Miramichi, New Brunswick
- Party: Progressive Conservative

Bill Hogan is a Canadian Progressive Conservative politician who has represented Carleton in the Legislative Assembly of New Brunswick since 2020. Prior to his political career, Hogan was a schoolteacher and later principal of Woodstock High School in Woodstock, New Brunswick.

== Political career ==
Hogan served on the town council for Woodstock, New Brunswick from 2010 until his election as MLA.

Hogan was elected to the Legislative Assembly of New Brunswick at the 2020 New Brunswick general election as a member of the New Brunswick Progressive Conservative Party.

On February 23, 2021, Hogan became the province's Minister of Public Safety.

=== Minister of Education and Early Childhood Development (2022–2024) ===
On October 13, 2022, Hogan became Minister of Education and Early Childhood Development, replacing Dominic Cardy who resigned.

In March 2023, a former student at WHS while Hogan was principal wrote a letter to the River Valley Sun calling on Hogan to focus on student's mental health. The River Valley Sun had the letter issued in their monthly newspaper, however no response from Hogan came.

In May 2023, the Hogan-led department announced that it was placing Policy 713 under review due to "concerns and misunderstandings of its implementation". Hogan stated that there were "hundreds of complaints from parents and teachers" but did not provide evidence or details for the claim, and its veracity was questioned by critics. On May 16, New Brunswick Child, Youth and Seniors' Advocate Kelly Lamrock published a 21-page report stating that his office had discovered three complaints, zero being made by either teachers or students. In late July, a freedom of information request filed by a University of New Brunswick professor found that the province had received no written complaints from parents claiming they were not told about changes in their child's name or pronouns.

== Electoral record ==
=== Woodstock-Hartland ===
2024 New Brunswick general election: Woodstock-Hartland
Party	Candidate	Votes	%	±%
Progressive Conservative	Bill Hogan	4,199	52.8%	+4.93
Liberal	Marisa Pelkey	2,549	32.1%	+15.33
People's Alliance	Charlie Webber	575	7.2%	-18.65
Green	Jada Roche	276	3.5%	-4.37
Independent	Ernest Culberson	209	2.6%	
New Democratic	Bo Sheaves	138	1.7%	+0.62
Total valid votes		7,946		
Total rejected ballots				
Turnout				
Eligible voters				
Progressive Conservative hold		Swing		
Source: Elections New Brunswick

=== Carleton ===
2020 New Brunswick general election
Party	Candidate	Votes	%	±%
Progressive Conservative	Bill Hogan	3,536	47.87	+8.29
People's Alliance	Graham Gill	1,909	25.85	-1.04
Liberal	Theresa Blackburn	1,239	16.77	+0.89
Green	Greg Crouse	581	7.87	-8.68
New Democratic	Shawn Oldenburg	80	1.08	-0.01
KISS	Andy Walton	41	0.56	New
Total valid votes		7,386	100.0	
Total rejected ballots		35	0.47	
Turnout		7,411	66.04	
Eligible voters		11,222		
Progressive Conservative hold		Swing		+4.67
Source: Elections New Brunswick
