= Fredericton-Grand Lake =

Provincial electoral district in New Brunswick, Canada

New Brunswick electoral district
- The riding of Fredericton-Grand Lake (as it exists from 2023) in relation to other New Brunswick electoral districts
- Coordinates: 46.067°N 66.168°W

Provincial electoral district
- Legislature: Legislative Assembly of New Brunswick
MLA
Kris Austin
Progressive Conservative
- District created: 2013
- First contested: 2014
- Last contested: 2024

Demographics
- Population (2011): 15,201
- Electors (2013): 11,509
- Census division(s): Sunbury, York, Queens
- Census subdivision(s): Fredericton, Maugerville, Noonan

Fredericton-Grand Lake (French: Fredericton-Grand Lac) is a provincial electoral district for the Legislative Assembly of New Brunswick, Canada. It was first contested in the 2014 general election, having been created in the 2013 redistribution of electoral boundaries.

The district includes the northeastern part of the City of Fredericton (most of Marysville and all of Barkers Point), the communities surrounding Grand Lake, and points in between including Noonan and Maugerville.

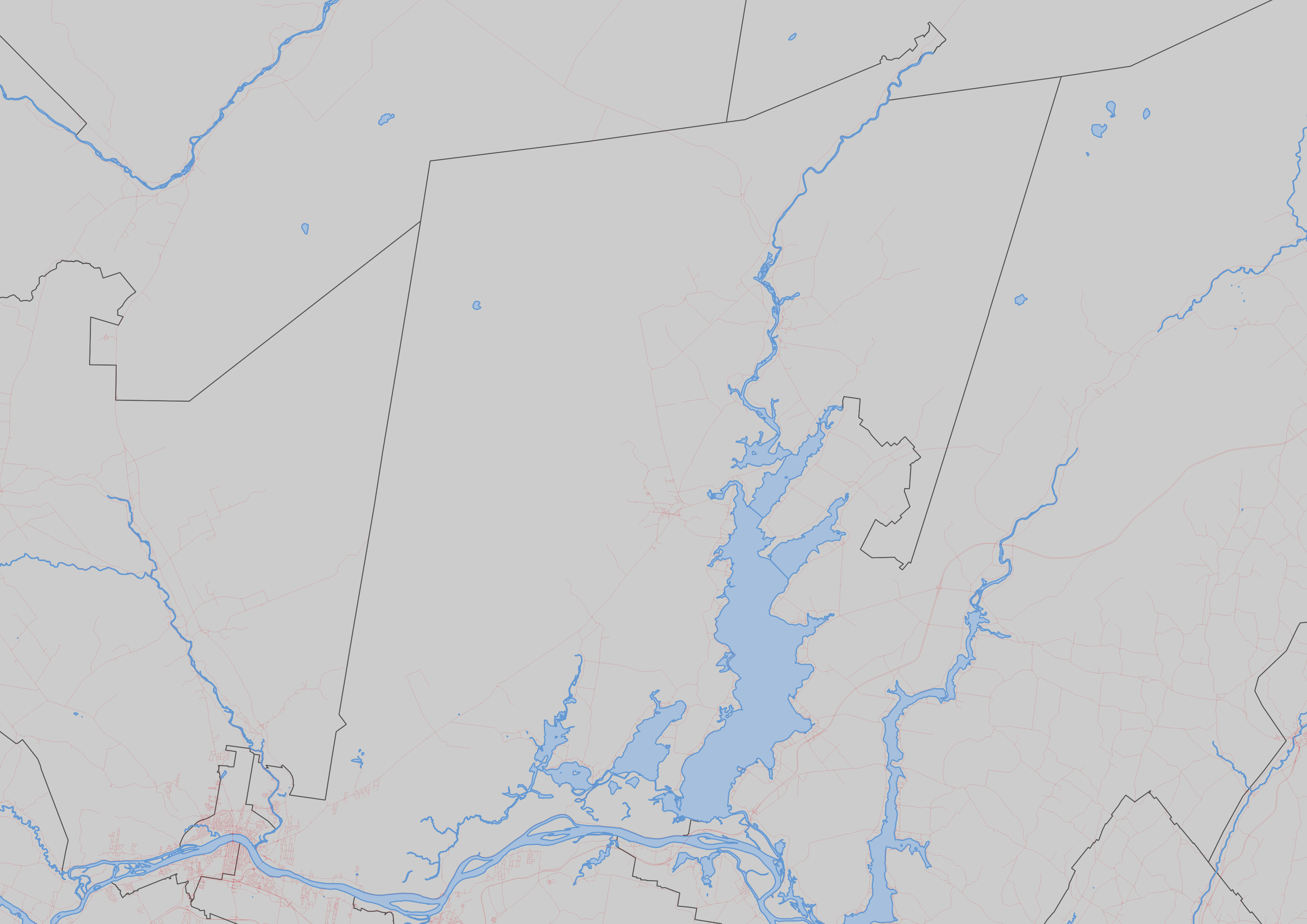
Fredericton-Grand Lake (as it exists from 2023) and the roads in the riding

== Members of the Legislative Assembly ==
| Assembly | Years | Member | Party |
|---|---|---|---|
Riding created from Grand Lake-Gagetown and Fredericton-Fort Nashwaak
| 58th | 2014–2018 | Pam Lynch | Progressive Conservative |
| 59th | 2018–2020 | Kris Austin | People's Alliance |
| 60th | 2020–2022 | Kris Austin | People's Alliance |
| 60th | 2022–2024 | Kris Austin | Progressive Conservative |
| 61st | 2024–Present | Kris Austin | Progressive Conservative |

== Election results ==
2024 New Brunswick general election
| Party | Candidate | Votes | % | ±% |
|---|---|---|---|---|
| Progressive Conservative | Kris Austin | 4,456 | 54.0% | +22.7 |
| Liberal | Kevin Dignam | 2,277 | 27.6% | +18.4 |
| Green | Ken Washburn | 862 | 10.4% | -3.0 |
| People's Alliance | Rick DeSaulniers | 461 | 5.6% | -39.2 |
| New Democratic | Arthur Taylor | 195 | 2.4% | +1.4 |
| Total valid votes | | 8,251 | | |
| Total rejected ballots | | | | |
| Turnout | | | | |
| Eligible voters | | | | |
Source: Elections New Brunswick

2020 provincial election redistributed results
| Party | % |
|---|---|
| People's Alliance | 44.8 |
| Progressive Conservative | 31.3 |
| Green | 13.4 |
| Liberal | 9.2 |
| New Democratic | 1.0 |

2020 New Brunswick general election
| Party | Candidate | Votes | % | ±% |
|---|---|---|---|---|
| People's Alliance | Kris Austin | 3,759 | 46.42 | -8.16 |
| Progressive Conservative | Roy Wiggins | 2,479 | 30.62 | +2.95 |
| Green | Ken Washburn | 1,005 | 12.41 | +7.04 |
| Liberal | Eldon Hunter | 749 | 9.25 | -1.61 |
| New Democratic | Greg Cook | 87 | 1.07 | -0.22 |
| KISS | Grenville Woollacott | 18 | 0.22 | +0.01 |
| Total valid votes | | 8,097 | 99.69 | |
| Total rejected ballots | | 25 | 0.31 | |
| Turnout | | 8,122 | 70.17 | |
| Eligible voters | | 11,575 | | |
| People's Alliance hold | | Swing | | -5.56 |
Source: Elections New Brunswick

2018 New Brunswick general election
| Party | Candidate | Votes | % | ±% |
|---|---|---|---|---|
| People's Alliance | Kris Austin | 4,799 | 54.58 | +25.79 |
| Progressive Conservative | Pam Lynch | 2,433 | 27.67 | -1.12 |
| Liberal | Wendy Tremblay | 955 | 10.86 | -17.05 |
| Green | Dan Weston | 472 | 5.37 | +1.08 |
| New Democratic | Glenna Hanley | 114 | 1.29 | -9.24 |
| KISS | Gerald Bourque | 19 | 0.21 | -- |
| Total valid votes | | 8,792 | 100.0 | |
| Total rejected ballots | | 10 | | |
| Turnout | | 8,802 | 75.08 | |
| Eligible voters | | 11,724 | | |
| People's Alliance gain from Progressive Conservative | | Swing | | +13.5 |
Source: Elections New Brunswick

2014 New Brunswick general election
| Party | Candidate | Votes | % |
|---|---|---|---|
| Progressive Conservative | Pam Lynch | 2,403 | 28.79 |
| People's Alliance | Kris Austin | 2,377 | 28.48 |
| Liberal | Sheri Shannon | 2,330 | 27.91 |
| New Democratic | Bronwen Mosher | 879 | 10.53 |
| Green | Dan Weston | 358 | 4.29 |
| Total valid votes | | 8,347 | 100.0 |
| Total rejected ballots | | 16 | 0.19 |
| Turnout | | 8,363 | 70.66 |
| Eligible voters | | 11,835 | |
Voting results declared after judicial recount.
This riding was created from parts of Grand Lake-Gagetown and Fredericton-Fort Nashwaak, both elected a Progressive Conservative in the previous election. Pam Lynch was the incumbent from Fredericton-Fort Nashwaak.
Source: Elections New Brunswick

== See also ==
- List of New Brunswick provincial electoral districts
- Canadian provincial electoral districts
