= 2012 New Brunswick Liberal Association leadership election =

- Date: October 27, 2012
- Convention: Casino New Brunswick; Moncton, New Brunswick
- Resigning leader: Shawn Graham
- Won by: Brian Gallant
- Ballots: 1
- Candidates: 3
- Entrance fee: $20,000

The New Brunswick Liberal Association held a leadership election on October 27, 2012 to replace outgoing leader Shawn Graham with a new leader to lead the party into the 2014 election. Graham was elected at the last leadership convention held in 2002 over Jack MacDougall. Graham announced he would not continue as leader the evening of September 27, 2010, after losing the provincial election earlier that day and formally resigned on November 9, 2010.

== Declared candidates ==
The following individuals were mentioned in media reports as potential candidates, and subsequently officially declared their candidacy:

=== Brian Gallant ===
Background: Former candidate in Moncton East in the 2006 election; lawyer and president of the Kent South Liberal Association.

Date campaign launched: January 25, 2012
Campaign website: www.briangallantnb.ca/english/
Supporters

- MLAs: (7) Hédard Albert, MLA for Caraquet; Donald Arseneault, MLA for Dalhousie-Restigouche East; Bill Fraser, MLA for Miramichi-Bay du Vin; Denis Landry, MLA for Centre-Péninsule-Saint-Sauveur; Bernard LeBlanc, MLA for Memramcook-Lakeville-Dieppe; Bertrand LeBlanc, MLA for Rogersville-Kouchibouguac; Roger Melanson, MLA for Dieppe Centre-Lewisville.
- Federal politicians: (1) Dominic LeBlanc, MP for Beausejour (2000–Present);
- Other prominent individuals: (5) Ray Frenette, former premier of New Brunswick (1997–1998); Roly MacIntyre, former MLA for Saint John East (2003–2010); Laureen Jarrett, former MLA for Saint John Kings and Ronald Ouellette, former MLA for Grand Falls-Drummond-Saint-André (2003–2010); Paul Zed, former MP for Fundy Royal (1993–1997) and Saint John (2004–2008)

Other information

=== Mike Murphy ===
Background Former MLA for Moncton North from 2003 to 2010; cabinet minister under Graham; former Liberal Party president.

Date campaign launched: January 5, 2012
Campaign website: mikemurphynb1.com
Supporters

- MLAs: (3) Chris Collins, MLA for Moncton East; Rick Doucet, MLA for Charlotte-The Isles; Brian Kenny, MLA for Bathurst,
- Federal politicians:
- Other prominent individuals: (12) Eric Allaby former MLA for Fundy Isles; T.J. Burke, former MLA for Fredericton North; James Doyle, former MLA for Miramichi-Bay du Vin; John Foran former MLA for Miramichi Centre; Larry Kennedy former MLA for Victoria-Tobique; Kelly Lamrock former MLA for Fredericton-Fort Nashwaak; Abel LeBlanc former MLA for Saint John Lancaster; Joan MacAlpine-Stiles, former MLA for Moncton West; Eugene McGinley, former MLA for Grand Lake-Gagetown and former Speaker of the Legislative Assembly of New Brunswick; John McKay former MLA for Miramichi Centre and former Speaker of the Legislative Assembly of New Brunswick; Brian Murphy Former MP for Moncton—Riverview—Dieppe (2006–2011); Wally Stiles, former MLA for Petitcodiac.

Other information

=== Nick Duivenvoorden ===
Background Former mayor of the town of Belledune.

Date campaign launched: November 26, 2011
Campaign website:
Supporters

- MPs:
- MLAs: Roland Haché, MLA for Nigadoo-Chaleur
- Other prominent individuals:

Other information

=== Declined ===
- Victor Boudreau, MLA for Shediac-Cap-Pelé since 2004; cabinet minister under Graham. Boudreau was elected interim leader of the Liberals on November 10, 2010 and said he would not seek the permanent leadership.
- Greg Byrne, MLA for Fredericton-Fort Nashwaak from 1995 to 1999 and MLA for Fredericton-Lincoln from 2006 to 2010; cabinet minister under McKenna, Frenette, Thériault and Graham; 1998 Liberal leadership candidate. Byrne joined the opposition office as Boudreau's chief of staff.
- Kelly Lamrock, MLA for Fredericton-Fort Nashwaak from 2003 to 2010; cabinet minister under Graham. Lamrock explored a candidacy and was reported as a candidate in the media, but did not run and endorsed Murphy.
- Dominic LeBlanc, MP for Beauséjour since 2000. LeBlanc is campaign co-chairperson for Brian Gallant's leadership campaign.
- Robert Dysart, partner at the law firm Stewart McKelvey and president of the Moncton West Liberal Association.
- Donald Arseneault, MLA for Dalhousie-Restigouche East since 2003; cabinet minister and deputy premier under Shawn Graham. Arsenault announced he would not be a candidate for the leadership in early November, 2011.
- Mary Schryer, MLA for Quispamsis from 2006 to 2010; cabinet minister under Graham; Schryer is campaign co-chairperson for Brian Gallant's leadership campaign.
- Roger Melanson, MLA for Dieppe Centre-Lewisville since 2010; senior advisor to former premier Camille Thériault. Melanson announced on his Facebook page on Jan 11, 2012 that he would not pursue the leadership.

== Results ==
New Brunswick's ridings coloured in based on the winning candidates and their popular vote

2012 Liberal leadership election results
Candidate	Points	%
Brian Gallant	3,259.44	59.26
Michael Murphy	2,089.39	37.99
Nick Duivenvoorden	151.17	2.75
