= Grand Lake-Gagetown =

Defunct provincial electoral district in New Brunswick, Canada

New Brunswick electoral district
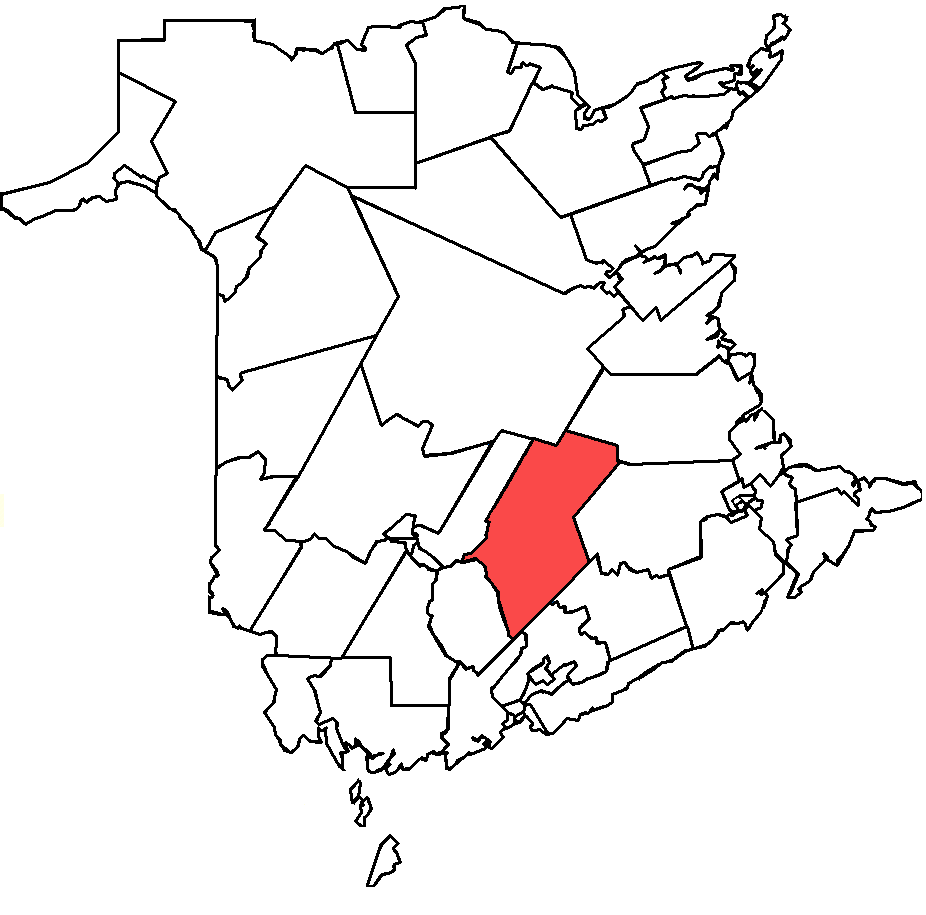
- Coordinates: 46.130°N 66.102°W

Defunct provincial electoral district
- Legislature: Legislative Assembly of New Brunswick
- District created: 2006
- District abolished: 2013
- First contested: 2006
- Last contested: 2010

Demographics
- Population (2001): 12,442
- Electors: 9,894
- Census division(s): Kent County, Sunbury County, Queens County
- Census subdivision(s): Village of Chipman, Arcadia, Village of Minto, Parish of Cambridge, Parish of Gagetown, Parish of Hampstead, Parish of Johnston, Parish of Wickham

Grand Lake-Gagetown was a provincial electoral district for the Legislative Assembly of New Brunswick, Canada. It was first created in the 2006 redrawing of electoral districts and was first used in the general election later that year. Its last MLA was Ross Wetmore.

== History ==
It was created in 2006 from parts of Grand Lake and Oromocto-Gagetown. From Grand Lake, it took Chipman, Minto, and other communities around the Grand Lake area, however large portions of the district—both in terms of geographics with large forested areas in the west of the district and in terms of population with suburban areas just outside of Fredericton—were lost to the district of Fredericton-Fort Nashwaak. From Oromocto-Gagetown it took all portions of the district north of the Saint John River, including the village of Gagetown.

== Members of the Legislative Assembly ==
Assembly	Years	Member	Party
Riding created from Grand Lake and Oromocto-Gagetown
56th	2006–2010	Eugene McGinley	Liberal
57th	2010–2014	Ross Wetmore	Progressive Conservative
Riding dissolved into Fredericton-Grand Lake and Gagetown-Petitcodiac

== Election results ==
2010 New Brunswick general election
Party	Candidate	Votes	%	±%
Progressive Conservative	Ross Wetmore	3,190	44.73	-0.89
Liberal	Barry Armstrong	2,118	29.70	-19.00
People's Alliance	Kris Austin	1,416	19.85	–
New Democratic	J.R. Magee	234	3.28	-2.40
Green	Sandra Burtt	174	2.44	–
Total valid votes		7,132	100.0	
Total rejected ballots		42	0.59	
Turnout		7,174	77.73	
Eligible voters		9,229		
Progressive Conservative gain from Liberal		Swing		+9.06
Source: Elections New Brunswick

2006 New Brunswick general election
Party	Candidate	Votes	%	±%
Liberal	Eugene McGuinley	3,524	48.70	
Progressive Conservative	Jack Carr	3,301	45.62	
New Democratic	Helen Marie Partridge	411	5.68	
Total valid votes		7,236	100.0	
Liberal notional gain		Swing		

* This was a new district being contested for the first time, being made up in parts from the former districts of Oromocto-Gagetown and Grand Lake. The majority of the district came from Grand Lake, which had been held by the Liberals, while Oromocto-Gagetown had been held by the Progressive Conservatives. McGuinley was the incumbent from Grand Lake.

== See also ==
- List of New Brunswick provincial electoral districts
- Canadian provincial electoral districts
