= Stewart Fairgrieve =

Canadian politician

Stewart Fairgrieve MLA

Member of the New Brunswick Legislative Assembly for Carleton
- In office October 5, 2015 – August 17, 2020
- Preceded by: David Alward
- Succeeded by: Bill Hogan

Personal details
- Party: Progressive Conservatives
- Spouse: Necedah
- Children: 3

Stewart John Fairgrieve is a Canadian politician, who was elected to the Legislative Assembly of New Brunswick in a by-election on October 5, 2015. He represented the electoral district of Carleton as a member of the Progressive Conservatives until 2020 when he retired.

== Electoral record ==
2018 New Brunswick general election: Carleton
Party	Candidate	Votes	%	±%
Progressive Conservative	Stewart Fairgrieve	2,982	39.58	-9.35
People's Alliance	Stewart B. Manuel	2,026	26.89	+25.41
Green	Amy Anderson	1,247	16.55	+4.38
Liberal	Christy Culberson	1,197	15.88	-17.60
New Democratic	Adam McAvoy	82	1.09	-1.86
Total valid votes		7,534	100.0	
Total rejected ballots		12		
Turnout		7,546	66.47	
Eligible voters		11,353		

New Brunswick provincial by-election, October 5, 2015 On the resignation of David Alward, May 22, 2015
Party	Candidate	Votes	%	±%
Progressive Conservative	Stewart Fairgrieve	3,144	48.91	-7.86
Liberal	Courtney Keenan	2,151	33.46	+11.26
Green	Andrew Clark	782	12.17	+1.68
New Democratic	Greg Crouse	254	3.95	-4.16
People's Alliance	Randall Leavitt	95	1.48	-0.95
Total valid votes		6,428	100.0	
Total rejected ballots		5	–	
Turnout		6,433	–	
Eligible voters		11,363		
