= Kelly Lamrock =

Canadian politician (born 1970)

Member of the New Brunswick Legislative Assembly for Fredericton-Fort Nashwaak
- In office June 9, 2003 – September 27, 2010
- Preceded by: Eric MacKenzie
- Succeeded by: Pam Lynch

Personal details
- Born: February 5, 1970 (age 56)
- Party: New Democrat (2013–present); Liberal (2001–2013)
- Occupation: Lawyer

Kelly Lamrock (born February 5, 1970) is a lawyer and political consultant in the province of New Brunswick, Canada. He was previously a Liberal member of the Legislative Assembly of New Brunswick for Fredericton-Fort Nashwaak, and Minister of Social Development in the New Brunswick cabinet before opening Lamrock's Law in Fredericton.

== Before politics ==
Kelly Lamrock was born in Saskatchewan on February 5, 1970. He moved with his family to British Columbia and lived there until his family relocated permanently to Fredericton, New Brunswick when he was eight years old. As a child Lamrock attended Garden Creek Elementary School and Albert Street Middle School. As a teenager he attended Fredericton High School. While there he competed in the World High School Public Speaking Championship, where he placed second, and was the winner of several national debating competitions.

He attended St. Thomas University, where he earned a Bachelor of Arts, and the University of New Brunswick, where he earned a Bachelor of Laws. He was president of the student unions at both institutions, the first and so far the only student to have occupied both posts. He was also involved in national student politics; he served as president of the Canadian Federation of Students and then was a leader in the split within that organization that led to the creation of the Canadian Alliance of Student Associations (CASA). He was the founding president of the New Brunswick Student Alliance, a provincial wing of CASA, during which time he authored "Open Doors, Open Minds" and "No More Smoke and Mirrors", two reports which led to his appearing before committees of the House of Commons of Canada and Senate of Canada, and led to a tuition freeze in New Brunswick.

Following graduation from university, Lamrock briefly ran his own law practice before becoming the Director of Policy and Communications for the New Brunswick Healthcare Association in 1998. In 1998 Kelly married Karen Lee, whom he met in university. The two were married at the Wilmot United Church in downtown Fredericton. In 2001, he became Director of Student Affairs at St. Thomas University.

== Political career ==
Though he had often been associated with the New Brunswick New Democratic Party and helped write that party's platform for the 1999 provincial election, he soon became active in the New Brunswick Liberal Party. Lamrock chaired the party's policy renewal process in 2001 and was nominated as candidate for Fredericton-Fort Nashwaak under the Liberal banner in 2002.

He was elected to the Legislature in the 2003 election and joined the shadow cabinet as co-critic for Education and critic for Post-Secondary Education. In November, following the resignation of veteran Liberal legislator Bernard Richard, Lamrock was given the high-profile role of Opposition House Leader.

Throughout the remainder of the legislative session, Lamrock became one of the most high-profile members of the Liberal caucus and carried several high-profile critic portfolios in addition to his House Leader duties. In 2006, he delivered the opposition reply to the budget due to the absence of the finance critic for a family emergency.

Lamrock was re-elected in a largely redistributed district, though still named Fredericton-Fort Nashwaak, in the 2006 election. Following the election he was named to the cabinet as Minister of Education and was also given responsibilities for the Advisory Council on Youth and the Provincial Capital Commission.

In June 2009, Premier Graham shuffled his cabinet, moving Lamrock to the Social Development portfolio. In January 2010, Lamrock was named Attorney General of New Brunswick.

On September 27, 2010, Lamrock was defeated in the 2010 New Brunswick Provincial election, losing his seat to Progressive Conservative candidate Pam Lynch.

=== MLA for Fredericton-Fort Nashwaak ===
During the 2006 provincial election Lamrock made a number of campaign promises to the constituents of Fredericton - Fort Nashwaak. Many of these promises related to issues that had been largely ignored by both Conservative and Liberal governments for years and, in some cases, decades.

==== The Marysville Bypass ====
The construction of a bypass system that would direct traffic around the community of Marysville had been a major issue of contention for nearly 30 years.

The bypass issue first emerged decades ago as the federal government began removing railway corridors that connected Fredericton and southwestern New Brunswick with central and northern regions of the province. In the absence of rail connections, automobile traffic increased along New Brunswick Route 8; much of that increase was transport trucks. Speed limits along Route 8 decrease quickly as the highway runs through the community of Marysville, serving as its Main Street. Many motorists and truckers do not adjust their speed limits and this has led to a number of serious accidents which compromised the safety of local residents.

Over the years, members of the community had organized to place pressure on the provincial government to build a bypass that would merge Route 8 with the old Trans-Canada highway alignment thereby redirecting traffic around the community and not through it. Despite community pressure on both Conservative and Liberal governments the Marysville bypass issue continued to be put on the back burner.

During the 2006 election campaign, Lamrock promised his constituents that the long sought after Marysville bypass would be constructed if he were elected to a Liberal government under Shawn Graham. On July 23, 2008, the first bucketful of soil was turned by an excavator, marking the beginning of the construction project and the end of the community's long fight to have it constructed.

The Marysville bypass project is funded through a federal-provincial partnership and enjoyed the support of all MLAs (Liberal and Conservative) whose ridings share Route 8 to northern New Brunswick. The entire project, which is part of a much larger infrastructure improvement project in New Brunswick, was slated to be completed by 2015.

==== Fredericton Community College ====
During his time in Opposition Lamrock took up the fight for the construction of a new community college in Fredericton. Once in power he continued to lobby his own government to construct a new campus to support the city's local tradespeople. Ultimately he was successful in his campaign to see the project realized, as Minister of Finance Greg Byrne announced in the 2009 budget released December 1 that construction would begin in January 2010 on a new community college campus in the city. "The $15-million facility, to be located on the University of New Brunswick campus, will cover 4,840 square metres (52,115 square feet) and accommodate programs in health, business administration, information technology, engineering technology and social services."

==== Cliffe Street Ramp ====
When constructed in 1981, the Westmorland Street bridge was built without a ramp on to Devonshire Drive. The "missing ramp", as it became known locally, remained a local irritant for citizens and the municipal government for years as it had been promised but continuously put off. In the 2006 campaign Lamrock campaigned on a promise to get the Cliffe Street ramp constructed. In March 2007 the Graham government announced funding for the project.

The project is now completed and includes an off-ramp onto Devonshire Drive that connects to Cliffe Street and Union Street. Major upgrades were made to the intersections at Cliffe Street and Union Street as well as to the intersection at Union Street and St. Mary's Street. St. Mary's Street has been made a provincially designated truck route, in an effort to minimize truck traffic in nearby residential neighbourhoods west of St. Mary's Street and along Main Street.

==== Investments in North Side recreation facilities ====
In 2007 Lamrock announced funding had been approved for the construction of playgrounds in Pepper Creek and Noonan. These communities have seen significant growth, particularly among young families. These two communities had originally asked the provincial government for playgrounds in 1999, but the Bernard Lord government did not move forward on the projects.

The Willie O'Ree hockey rink has been open since 2008, and the Royals Field has been refurbished as well.

==== Princess Margaret Bridge repairs ====
Lamrock successfully lobbied his government and Minister of Transportation Denis Landry for repairs to the Princess Margaret Bridge. The project began in 2009 after a 10 kilogram piece of concrete fell from the structure onto the roadway beneath. On January 12, 2010, the Department of Transportation announced that $30 million would be spent on upgrading and repairing the 52-year-old iconic structure in 2010-2011.

=== Minister of Education ===
Lamrock was named Minister of Education by Premier Shawn Graham in October 2006 after winning the Provincial General Election on September 27, 2006. He served as Minister of Education until Premier Graham's first major cabinet shuffle in June 2009. As Minister of Education, Lamrock instituted a number of policies aimed at re-orienting New Brunswick's educational system towards the realities of the globalized information economy.

==== "When Kids Come First" ====
"When Kids Come First" was Lamrock's five-year plan to accomplish what he saw as the necessary challenges facing the New Brunswick education system. Lamrock's vision was adopted by the Graham government as an integral part of the Liberal government's self-sufficiency agenda. "When Kids Come First" laid out three primary objectives:

1. Every child will arrive at kindergarten ready to learn.
2. Every child will leave Grade 5 having mastered the tools to learn - reading, writing and numeracy.
3. Every child will graduate from high school having had the opportunity to discover his or her personal strengths and to find something he or she loves doing.

Behind these objectives was an implicit logic that recognized that the world continues to become smaller, and that while globalization was a fuzzy concept a decade ago, today certain aspects of it are solidifying into a new global reality. Lamrock explained the logic behind this plan in his introductory message:

"In the future, companies will be able to move quickly to where the best trained employees are. If our kids don't read, write or do math well enough to learn new skills in a world of constant change, the jobs will move somewhere else - somewhere that did a better job of teaching them.

One of the skills most in demand will be the ability to solve problems. Following instructions will be work done in low wage economies, or by machines. The people who control their economic future will be the kids who went through school solving problems and challenging themselves, not just following orders".

"When Kids Come First" recognized that the educational system in New Brunswick was built on a pedagogical structure that was being challenged by the realities and demands of a globalized economy. Without question Lamrock's plan created some controversy as he began to implement his vision.

==== Literacy rates ====
Lamrock inherited an educational system that faced some of the most daunting challenges in the nation. In 2000, out of the 10 Canadian provinces, New Brunswick had the lowest literacy rates with only marginal improvement between 2000 and 2006 when Lamrock became Minister of Education.

As Minister of Education Lamrock oversaw an increase in per-student spending from $6,740 as of the 2005-2006 school year to $8,573 during the 2008-2009 school year. Increasing funding per student surpassed its desired results in 2009 when the Department of Education announced that 20% of Grade Two students could read at an exceptional level and 90% of students could read at an appropriate level for their age group. Overall between Anglophones and Francophones, student literacy rates in New Brunswick had increased by 11% since he had taken office in 2006.

In September 2009, Minister of Education Roland Hache recognized the accomplishments made by Lamrock during his time as education minister, stating, "the education system has undergone some very significant, yet very necessary, changes in the past few years. The knowledge and skills that students need to succeed in the workforce of tomorrow are very different from previous generations. It was essential that the education system be adapted to ensure that today's students have the tools they need."

==== Innovative Learning Fund ====
In addition to increased investment in students Lamrock's vision also called for an investment in teachers. The Innovative Learning Fund was established to "encourage, facilitate, recognize and reward innovative and creative instructional approaches that will increase student learning and academic performance, and enhance teaching practices." Under this program teachers, schools and school boards could apply for grants to fund projects aimed at creating innovative curriculum and teaching models.

To date the Innovative Learning Fund has distributed six million dollars to 612 projects in the Anglophone sector and just under six million dollars to 584 projects in the Francophone sector.

==== French immersion ====
On March 14, 2008, Lamrock announced the elimination of all public school French Second Language training prior to Grade 5 in New Brunswick, including the popular Early French Immersion program which started in Grade 1. Instead all students would have five months of "intensive" French in Grade 5, and there would be an optional Late French Immersion program starting in Grade 6. The logic behind the legislation was to allow Anglophone students to learn the basics of reading, spelling, and arithmetic in their mother tongue before introducing the French language into their studies. A number of studies argued that Early French Immersion hindered the ability of many Anglophone youth to grasp the elemental building blocks of their education as they had to learn a new language while simultaneously learning the basics of math and grammar. It also put non-bilingual parents at a disadvantage as they were often unable to assist their children with their homework. Introducing French Immersion in Grade 6 would allow Anglophone children the ability to grasp the necessary fundamentals of education while still providing enough time to become functionally bilingual by graduation. Despite the best of intentions public reaction was highly critical of the move, and groups called for Lamrock's resignation over the matter.

On June 11, 2008, Justice Hugh McLellan of the Court of Queen's Bench of New Brunswick overturned Lamrock's decision of March 14, calling it unfair and unreasonable because he had not allowed enough time for debate before making his decision. In response, Lamrock announced a new consultation with a deadline of July 25, 2008, and stated that he would make a final decision on August 5. Electronic submissions to this new consultation were posted on the Government of New Brunswick's website.

On June 18, 2008, former leader of the New Brunswick Liberal Party, Bernard Richard, who now held the position of provincial Ombudsman and Child and Youth Advocate, spoke out against Lamrock's plan. In his Report of the Ombudsman into the Minister of Education’s decision to modify the French Second Language Curriculum, Richard recommended that the government defer the consultation announced by Lamrock and delay implementation of the elimination of early French immersion until September 2009, citing:

- Unfairness stemming from a lack of consultation
- Unfairness due to insufficient notice prior to implementation
- Decision premised upon a mistake of fact arising from errors in statistical analysis and other factual errors
- Failure to consider all the evidence before the Commissioners and before the Minister
- Bias arising from an alleged predetermination of the consultation outcomes
- Determination of FSL policy on the basis of irrelevant grounds or considerations, or for an improper purpose
- Failure to consider commitments of citizen engagement in the government response to the Commission on Legislative Democracy

On August 5, 2008, Lamrock and Premier Shawn Graham announced a revised plan for French Second Language Education, subsequent to the public consultation. In this new plan early immersion had been cut and middle immersion would be offered in Grade 3 as of 2010, following an introduction to French language and culture for all students starting in kindergarten, to be implemented in 2009. Students who were not in the immersion program would begin intensive French in Grade 5 as of September 2008, and a greater variety of options were planned for the higher grades.

In September 2009, Education Minister Roland Hache released statistics which were claimed to validate the reforms undertaken by Lamrock and Premier Shawn Graham. "Last year's reforms [2008] to French second-language programming have also had positive results, with 58% of Grade 5 Intensive French students now hitting the provincial target, as compared to only 2% under the previous Core French program." However, the education reforms had also resulted in a drop of 6 percentage points in Grade 5 math scores as well as declines in French Immersion reading and writing scores.

=== Minister of Social Development ===
In June 2009 Lamrock was moved to the Social Development portfolio in a cabinet shuffle.

==== Poverty reduction ====
As Minister of Social Development, Lamrock inherited a public engagement initiative, launched by Premier Shawn Graham, tasked with the job of studying poverty in New Brunswick and recommending measures to combat it.

The government engaged the public through a number of public forums held throughout the province between October 2008 and March 2009. The forums were organized to bring together government officials, business leaders, non-profit organizations, and individuals living in poverty to discuss what poverty means, what causes it, and what can be done to reduce it.

The public forums painted a very clear picture of the state of poverty in New Brunswick. While a number of themes emerged, the single most consistent opinion communicated was that the social assistance system, as it was constructed, further exacerbated poverty in the province. Rather than assisting people to regain their self-reliance, social assistance trapped people in poverty.

On October 7, 2009, in a speech to a group of Saint John business leaders, Lamrock openly challenged his own government, proposing to reform the social assistance program and raise rates that had been frozen in the Spring. Lamrock argued, "We can't ask people to live on less than $300.00 a month and wonder why they don't focus on work. It's because they focus on surviving... And I want to be really clear on this one, if we want people to be self-reliant, we can't have a myriad of complex rules that make people feel if they take one wrong step, they lose their cheques."

Lamrock's comments signaled a significant shift in the way the Department of Social Development would be run under his watch. He criticized the social assistance system, stating that its programs had functioned exclusively to "save money, not to help the poor. A new mandate comes down from Finance and we figure out which are the least vulnerable people who can be squeezed off the system... that's what's driven social assistance reform for 20 years and it has to stop."

On November 12 and 13, 2009, the final forum of the task force was held in Saint John. The participants agreed to the first poverty reduction strategy in New Brunswick in the report "Overcoming Poverty Together: The New Brunswick Economic and Social Inclusion Plan".

Among its recommendations the Poverty Reduction Plan suggested that three reforms needed to take place immediately:

1. The elimination of the interim social assistance rate program (single employable people)
2. Extend health card for persons exiting social assistance for up to 3 years until prescription drug program is introduced
3. The household income policy will only be applied to social assistance recipients who are in spousal relationships (making it permissible for people on social assistance to have a roommate)

The Poverty Reduction Plan has been well received by groups who advocate on behalf of New Brunswick's poor. Brian Duplessis, the Executive Director of Fredericton Homeless Shelters, was encouraged by the steps Lamrock has taken, but argued that more needed to be done to address issues of deep poverty in New Brunswick.

Brian Duplessis; Brenda Murphy, coordinator for the Urban Core Support Network in Saint John; and Wendy McDermott, coordinator of Vibrant Communities Saint John, all agreed that while there is much work to be done, the steps undertaken by Lamrock were reforms that anti-poverty advocates have been lobbying the province to make for years.

Premier Shawn Graham stated, "What has been agreed is exceptional, and it will put us on the right path to achieving our poverty-reduction goals and helping thousands of New Brunswickers be more self-sufficient."

==== Extending health card benefits ====
On December 9, 2009, Lamrock announced the extension of the health card benefits up to three years for those exiting social assistance and entering the workforce. This extension was proposed by the poverty reduction task force as an interim solution to provide health and dental benefits until the province completed its prescription drug plan set to begin in April 2012. Extending health card benefits recognizes that many people on social assistance enter the workforce in minimum wage jobs that do not offer health and dental benefits.

==== Disability supplement reforms ====
On January 13, 2010, Lamrock rose in the New Brunswick Legislature to announce that reforms had been made to the provincial disability supplement program to ensure that those who exceeded the income threshold would not lose this vital supplement. Effective January 1, 2010, the disability supplement would eliminate income cutoffs and replace them with a declining scale system so that if a person was $6 over the threshold, he would not lose the entire supplement of $1000, but rather the supplement would decrease by $6 and the person would receive $994.

==== Increasing social assistance rates ====
On January 18, 2010, Lamrock rose in the New Brunswick Legislature to announce that reforms had also been made to the social assistance rates, increasing them by 82%. The rates which were under $300 had been increased to $536.

==== Eliminating the economic unit policy ====
On February 18, 2010, Lamrock rose in the New Brunswick Legislature to announce that the economic unit policy which prevented those receiving social assistance from having a roommate had been eliminated. All New Brunswickers receiving social assistance prior to January 1, 2010, would immediately benefit from this program. By June 30, 2011, the program would be extended to all recipients of social assistance who began receiving benefits after the January 1, 2010, cut off date.

Lamrock explained why the program was being rolled out in this way in the Legislature on February 18, 2010:

"I want to inform the House of the three steps that will be taken to change this policy forever. In the covenant for poverty reduction, there was an agreement that the government would excuse all those on social assistance today from the economic unit policy, except for spouses, who have an obligation to look after each other. That means that all those who are social assistance clients as of January 1 can now—and in the future—take on roommates or move in with a brother. A parent can move in with their adult child who can help look after them in tough times. That can happen. When we looked at it, we also decided that was not enough. We want to make sure that we are cementing this policy once and for all.

Second, I want to let the House know that the department has begun the delicate work of redrafting the policy altogether. Certainly, no one in this House wants to see an 18-year-old be able to graduate from high school and go on social assistance while living with their parents. No one wants to excuse spouses from their obligation to look after each other for richer or for poorer. While being consistent with the charter and not discriminating, we want to make absolutely sure that we draft a policy that makes sense. We have committed, and we have ordered the department today, that that work is to be done by June 30, 2011, so that not only are we excusing the clients whom we are excusing today, but we are also going to fix it for everybody.

Third, we also understand that while that important drafting work is being undertaken, there will be new applicants—those who may fall upon hard times and those who may be looking to share expenses or have a little bit of help. I am also pleased to inform the House that we have allowed the Minister of Social Development to make exemptions for new applicants. We will also set up a committee to advise the minister. It will be made up of the people living in poverty, the front line poverty advocates, and the community leaders who were part of the poverty reduction strategy in the first place. This will allow the minister to help all those who come looking for help, and who do not have anyone who should be expected to look after them, to be exempt from the economic unit policy. I also want to make it clear that the ministerial discretion is there to protect people. I will soon be making public a mandate letter to the committee with the principles that we intend to use."

The Opposition offered criticism to Lamrock's actions on the economic unit policy, which is part of a much larger Poverty Reduction Strategy, which the Conservative Party leader David Alward signed and lent his party's support to in Saint John in November 2009.

=== Attorney General of New Brunswick ===
On January 4, 2010, Premier Shawn Graham appointed Lamrock Attorney General of New Brunswick after his predecessor, Michael B. Murphy, resigned his seat in the legislature to spend time with his family.

==== Civil Forfeiture Act ====
As Attorney General of New Brunswick, Lamrock introduced the Civil Forfeiture Act to the legislature in mid-February 2010. Although this particular legislation had been promised by his predecessor, Lamrock followed through with its introduction.

Lamrock expressed his support for the Civil Forfeiture Act on his website kellylamrock.com.

"This legislation closes an important loophole. Many drug houses and child pornography operations happen in rental properties with no clear tenant, but where dozens of people have access. We have properties laden with violence at night and discarded needles by morning where there is no reasonable doubt there is a crime. We have computers full of horrible videos of kids being tortured where by the sheer number of people with access, none can be convicted. When an item can be proven to be aiding an ongoing activity, and it can be proven the removal of the item will stop the crime, I think that is acceptable."

Kelly continued to explain his support for the legislation by stating,

"While I am a critic of the fed's "lock 'em up" approach, I see nothing progressive in leaving families in poor neighbourhoods like Doone Street (a struggling neighbourhood in Devon on Fredericton’s north side) to see crime and violence normalized for their kids when the crime is proven but the individuals are not."

Lamrock was quick to point out that this Legislation does not give police in New Brunswick the ability to violate civil liberties:

"Any legislation, including this one, is subject to Charter scrutiny and the Canadian Charter of Rights trumps the Bill. In other words, protected rights, such as the right against unreasonable search and seizure under Section 8, cannot be subverted."

"More directly the bill does not change the need for warrants, due process, limits on searches or evidentiary admissibility. The Civil Forfeiture Act allows the Crown, if it can prove property was used in the commission of a crime, to seize it. But to seize the property, the Crown still has to prove that in court with a right to legal defence. In proving that the property was used in commission of a crime they still follow the same procedures used in proving an individual committed a crime — no search without a warrant, no unreasonable searches, etc."

=== Acting Minister of Justice and Consumer Affairs ===
Lamrock was named Acting Minister of Justice and Consumer Affairs by Premier Shawn Graham on February 10, 2010, after the resignation of his predecessor Bernad LeBlanc.

==== Judicature Act ====
On February 18, 2010, Lamrock introduced the Judicature Act to the New Brunswick Legislature. The purpose of this act is to amend the Judicature Act which will provide sufficient authority to implement some of the recommendations made by the Family Justice Task Force. The act also creates a Master to divide the labour of the court in order to ensure the appropriate services are provided to those who need them and to help increase access to the Family Justice system.

==== Insurance Act ====
On February 24, 2010, Lamrock introduced the Insurance Act to the New Brunswick Legislature for first reading. The act would prevent insurance companies from using credit scores in determining the rates they charge New Brunswickers for home, car, and life insurance.

This legislation puts New Brunswick ahead of the curve on this matter. Currently Alberta and Ontario prevent insurance companies from using individual financial history for automobile insurance; the proposed legislation before the New Brunswick Assembly would go further to prevent financial history from being used for home and life insurance as well.

"If powerful companies can take advantage of consumers then the little guy can get hurt," Lamrock told reporters outside the house. "Government has to maintain the ability to step in and make sure that companies aren't using information that has nothing to do with your risk as a driver or homeowner in order to determine the price of your insurance."

"This will provide us with the ability to stop the practice of jacking up insurance rates based on irrelevant questions," Lamrock, the MLA for Fredericton-Fort Nashwaak said, adding that 40 years ago insurance companies asked race-based questions to identify risk. People's insurance premiums should be determined solely by the risk they pose to the insurer for claims."

=== Minister responsible for the New Brunswick Provincial Capital Commission ===
Lamrock was made the minister responsible for the New Brunswick Provincial Capital Commission by Premier Shawn Graham in 2006. The idea for the agency existed only as an idea which originated from a 2003 report commissioned by the previous Conservative government. On March 1, 2007 Lamrock and Premier Graham announced the creation of the non-partisan, arm's-length agency.

The creation of the Provincial Capital Commission also saw the creation of the Capital Region, a geographic space that includes nine electoral districts with its centre being the Legislative Assembly in downtown Fredericton, New Brunswick. The Provincial Capital Commission is responsible for protecting and celebrating the history and cultural diversity of New Brunswick.

==== I Walked with My Premier and MLA ====
Since its creation in 2007 the Provincial Capital Commission has begun a number of successful initiatives including "I Walked with My Premier and MLA" in the early fall of 2008 that saw more than 2000 students from across the province travel to Fredericton for a walk around the city with the premier and all the members of the Legislative Assembly.

==== Capital Encounters ====
The Capital Encounters program is an initiative that subsidizes travel expenses for schools who visit Fredericton. During the trip students tour the capital city, meet with their local MLA, and when the legislature is in session they sit in the public gallery and are formally introduced in the chamber to the speaker and the other members of the assembly.

==== Host communities for New Brunswick Day ====
In 2007 the Provincial Capital Commission instituted a host community for the traditional August 1 civil holiday New Brunswick Day. In 2007 the inaugural host community was the premier's hometown of Rexton, New Brunswick. In 2008 the host community was Shediac, New Brunswick; in 2009 it was McAdam, New Brunswick; and in 2010 Rexton once again played host to the celebrations.

=== Minister responsible for housing ===
Lamrock became the minister responsible for Housing in the cabinet shuffle on June 22, 2009. In this capacity he was responsible for issues related to low-income housing and seniors' housing within the province.

=== 2010 election ===
In the 2010 provincial election, Lamrock lost his seat to Conservative challenger Pam Lynch.

Following the election, Graham resigned as Liberal leader and Lamrock was rumoured as a potential leadership candidate. On February 29, 2012, Lamrock announced through social media and his campaign website that he was entering the leadership race, but on May 17, he released a statement on his official blog announcing that he would not be seeking the leadership.

=== 2013 switch to NDP ===
In February 2013, Lamrock switched to the NDP, under Dominic Cardy. He ran in the 2014 general election as an NDP candidate but lost to Green Party leader David Coon, coming in fourth place with 19.7% of the vote. Lamrock was appointed acting executive director of the party in 2016.

== Post-political career ==
Lamrock's post-political career has seen him act as legal counsel on a number of high-profile legal cases, representing groups such as parents fighting school closures and massage therapists appealing mass suspensions by their professional associations. He co-founded Mostly The Moment Theatre Company in Fredericton. In 2016 Lamrock worked as a Parliamentary Affairs Consultant to the new elected parliament in Tunisia.

In 2021 the Higgs government appointed Lamrock to the new post of Child and Youth Advocate for New Brunswick.

== Cabinet posts ==
New Brunswick provincial government of Shawn Graham
Cabinet posts (4)
Predecessor	Office	Successor
Bernard LeBlanc	Minister of Justice and Consumer Affairs; 2010	
Mike Murphy	Attorney General of New Brunswick; 2010	Marie-Claude Blais
Mary Schryer	Minister of Social Development; 2009–2010	Sue Stultz
Claude Williams	Minister of Education; 2006–2009	Roland Haché
Special Cabinet Responsibilities
Predecessor	Title	Successor
none	Minister responsible for the Provincial Capital Commission; 2006–2009 new designation	
Mary Schryer	Minister responsible for Housing; 2009–2010	
Bernard Lord	Minister responsible for Youth; 2006–2009	position abolished
