= Jocelyne Roy-Vienneau =

Lieutenant Governor of New Brunswick from 2014 to 2019

The Honourable Jocelyne Roy-Vienneau ONB
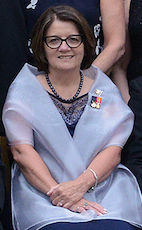
- Roy-Vienneau in 2016

31st Lieutenant Governor of New Brunswick
- In office October 23, 2014 – August 2, 2019
- Monarch: Elizabeth II
- Governors General: David Johnston; Julie Payette
- Premier: Brian Gallant; Blaine Higgs
- Preceded by: Graydon Nicholas
- Succeeded by: Brenda Murphy

Personal details
- Born: Jocelyne Roy; 1956 Newcastle, New Brunswick, Canada
- Died: August 2, 2019 (aged 63) Bathurst, New Brunswick, Canada
- Spouse: Ronald Vienneau
- Children: 2
- Education: Université de Moncton

Jocelyne Roy-Vienneau ONB (née Roy; 1956 – August 2, 2019) was the 31st Lieutenant Governor of New Brunswick. She was installed on October 23, 2014. She was the viceregal representative of Queen Elizabeth II of Canada in the Province of New Brunswick.

== Early life and education ==
Born in Newcastle, Miramichi, New Brunswick in 1956 and raised in Robertville, New Brunswick, Roy-Vienneau was the first woman to occupy a secular position as Vice President of a campus at the Université de Moncton, the first woman to direct a francophone community college in New Brunswick, and one of the first women to graduate from the Université de Moncton’s Faculty of Engineering.

== Career ==
Roy-Vienneau held a number of successful positions in education and engineering. She served two terms ending in 2014 as vice-president at the Université de Moncton's Shippagan Campus. Previously to that, Roy-Vienneau was Assistant Deputy Minister, Post-Secondary Education, with New Brunswick's Department of Education. She also held several positions at the New Brunswick Community College in Bathurst, including director general and dean of Education. She began her career as a project engineer at the Esso Imperial Oil Limited refinery in Montreal.

In August 2014, Roy-Vienneau was appointed Lieutenant Governor of New Brunswick by Governor General of Canada David Lloyd Johnston on the Constitutional advice of Prime Minister of Canada Stephen Harper, on the suggestion of Premier David Alward with support from the opposition. She was the first Acadian woman to occupy the post.

In 2015, the Jocelyne Roy-Vienneau Undergraduate Engineering Scholarships for Women was created in her honour by the Association of Professional Engineers and Geoscientists of New Brunswick, and is offered annually. Two scholarships worth $3000 are awarded to female second year undergraduate students studying engineering, respectively to one student at the University of New Brunswick, and one student at the Université de Moncton per year.

== 2018 provincial elections ==
Roy-Vienneau played the role of referee in the aftermath of the 2018 New Brunswick general election, after no party won a majority. Of 49 seats, the Progressive Conservatives under Blaine Higgs won 22, the outgoing Liberals under Brian Gallant won 21, the Greens won 3 and the People's Alliance also won 3. Premier Brian Gallant met the lieutenant-governor and received permission to remain in power while submitting a throne speech to the legislature for a confidence vote. On November 2, the Liberal government lost the vote of confidence by a margin of 25–23. The lieutenant-governor therefore accepted the resignation of Brian Gallant, and Blaine Higgs became premier of New Brunswick.

== Death ==
Roy-Vinneau died from cancer on August 2, 2019, after first being diagnosed in spring 2018. Canadian Prime Minister Justin Trudeau issued a statement regarding her death, offering condolences on behalf of his family and praising her achievements and contributions, saying "her work will continue to inspire future leaders for years to come". On the day of her death, the Royal Canadian Mounted Police were asked to investigate "financial irregularities" in her office.
