= Fredericton-Fort Nashwaak (2006–2013) =

Defunct provincial electoral district in New Brunswick, Canada

New Brunswick electoral district
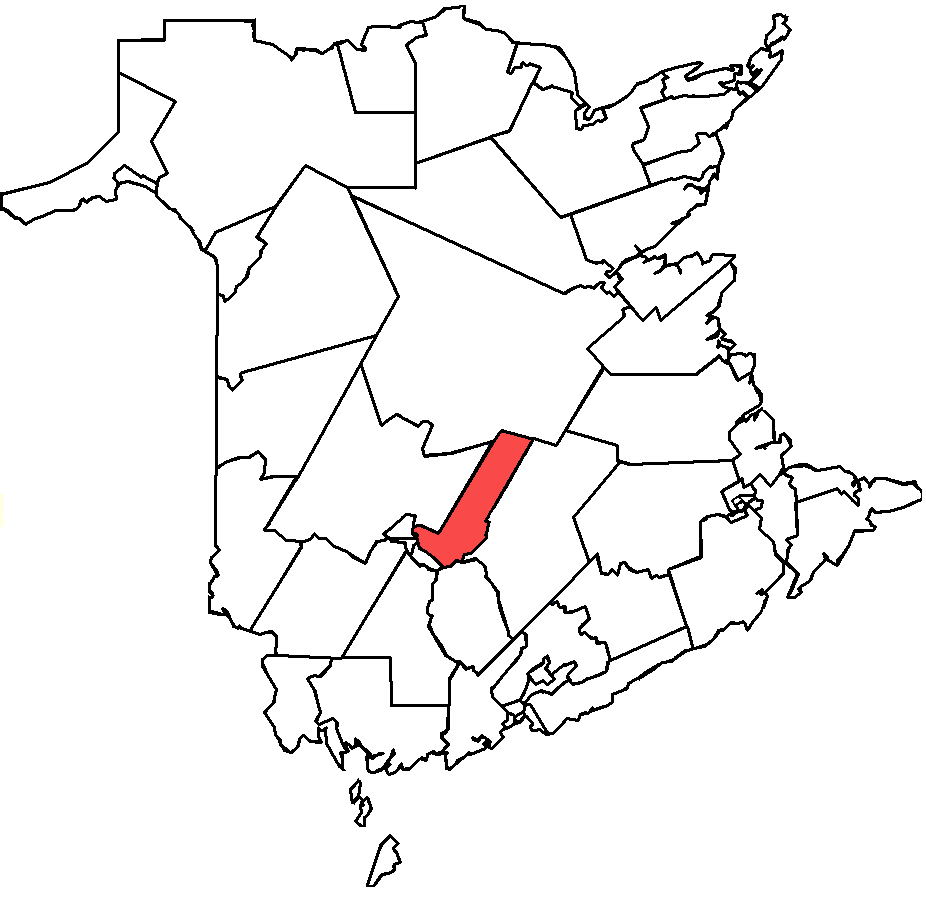
- Coordinates: 46.091°N 66.543°W

Defunct provincial electoral district
- Legislature: Legislative Assembly of New Brunswick
- District created: 2006
- District abolished: 2013
- First contested: 2006
- Last contested: 2010

Demographics
- Population (2006): 14,302
- Electors: 11,088
- Census division(s): York County, Sunbury County
- Census subdivision(s): City of Fredericton, Noonan Parish, Maugerville Parish, St. Mary's Parish, Parish of Sheffield

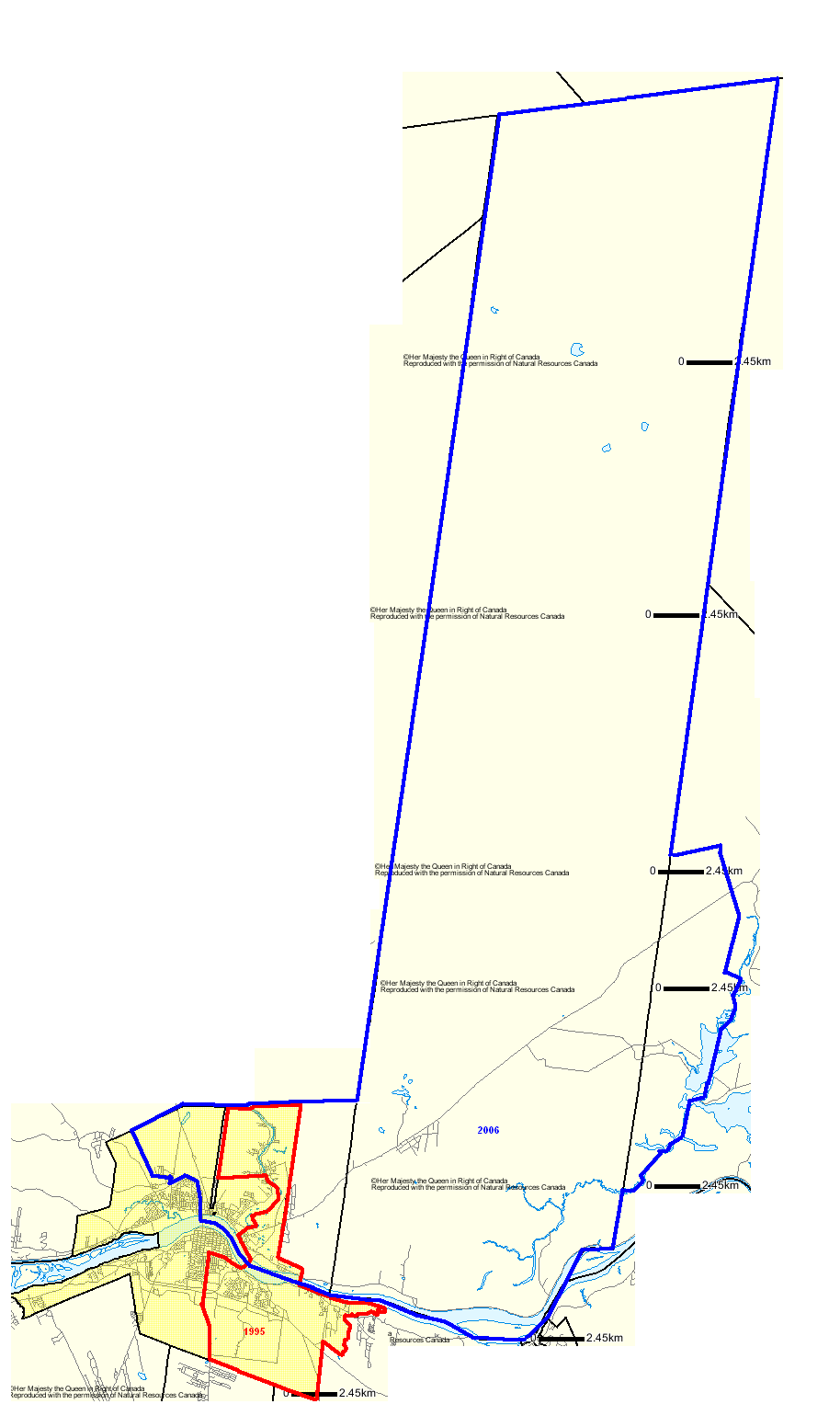
Contrasting the old Fredericton-Fort Nashwaak (1995–2006) in red with the new (2006 to present) in blue

Fredericton-Fort Nashwaak was a provincial electoral district for the Legislative Assembly of New Brunswick, Canada. It was first created in the 2006 redrawing of electoral districts and was first used in the general election later that year. Its last MLA was Pam Lynch of the Progressive Conservative Party of New Brunswick.

== History ==
The district was created in the 2006 redistribution although, somewhat confusingly, a district by the same name existed immediately prior to this. The district combined those portions of the old Fredericton-Fort Nashwaak district north of the Saint John River with approximately half of the Fredericton North district (those portions east of the Westmorland Street Bridge) with suburban areas from the old riding of Grand Lake as well as a large part of unpopulated territory also from Grand Lake.

== Members of the Legislative Assembly ==
Assembly	Years	Member	Party
Riding created from Fredericton North and Fredericton-Fort Nashwaak (1995–2006)
56th	2006–2010	Kelly Lamrock	Liberal
57th	2010–2014	Pam Lynch	Progressive Conservative
Riding dissolved into Fredericton-Grand Lake, Fredericton North and Fredericton-York

== Election results ==
2010 New Brunswick general election
Party	Candidate	Votes	%	±%
Progressive Conservative	Pam Lynch	3,582	47.29	+4.98
Liberal	Kelly Lamrock	2,576	34.01	-23.67
New Democratic	Andrew Scott	866	11.43	–
Green	Kathleen MacDougall	550	7.26	–
Total valid votes		7,574	100.0	
Total rejected ballots		56	0.73	
Turnout		7,630	65.61	
Eligible voters		11,630		
Progressive Conservative gain from Liberal		Swing		+14.33
Source: Elections New Brunswick

2006 New Brunswick general election
Party	Candidate	Votes	%	±%
Liberal	Kelly Lamrock	3,817	57.68	
Progressive Conservative	Heather Hughes	2,800	42.32	
Total valid votes		6,617	100.0	
Liberal notional gain		Swing		

* This was a new district being contested for the first time, being made up in parts from the former districts of Fredericton-Fort Nashwaak, Fredericton North and Grand Lake. All three of these districts were previously held by the Liberals and Kelly Lamrock, the Liberal candidate, was the incumbent from the former district of Fredericton-Fort Nashwaak.

== See also ==
- List of New Brunswick provincial electoral districts
- Canadian provincial electoral districts
