= Noonan, New Brunswick =

Community in New Brunswick, Canada

Coordinates: 45°57′48″N 66°31′57″W

Noonan is a small community in the Canadian province of New Brunswick. It is located approximately 10 km east of Fredericton, New Brunswick.

The former local service district of Noonan took its name from the community.

== Demographics ==
In the 2021 Census of Population conducted by Statistics Canada, Noonan had a population of 1,086 living in 412 of its 416 total private dwellings, a change of 4.2% from its 2016 population of 1,042. With a land area of 75.81 km^{2} (29.27 sq mi), it had a population density of 14.3/km^{2} (37.1/sq mi) in 2021.

== See also ==
- List of communities in New Brunswick
