= Pam Lynch =

Canadian politician

Member of the New Brunswick Legislative Assembly for Fredericton-Grand Lake Fredericton-Fort Nashwaak (2010-2014)
- In office October 12, 2010 – September 24, 2018
- Preceded by: Kelly Lamrock
- Succeeded by: Kris Austin

Personal details
- Born: Kingsclear, New Brunswick, Canada
- Party: Progressive Conservative

Pamela R. "Pam" Lynch is a Canadian politician, who was elected to the Legislative Assembly of New Brunswick in the 2010 provincial election, defeating Liberal cabinet minister Kelly Lamrock. She represented the electoral district of Fredericton-Fort Nashwaak from 2010 to 2014, and represented the new district of Fredericton-Grand Lake from 2014 until 2018, as a member of the Progressive Conservatives.

Lynch was named to the Select Committee on Cannabis, pursuant to Motion 31 of the 3rd session of the 58th New Brunswick Legislature.
