= Ross Wetmore =

Canadian politician

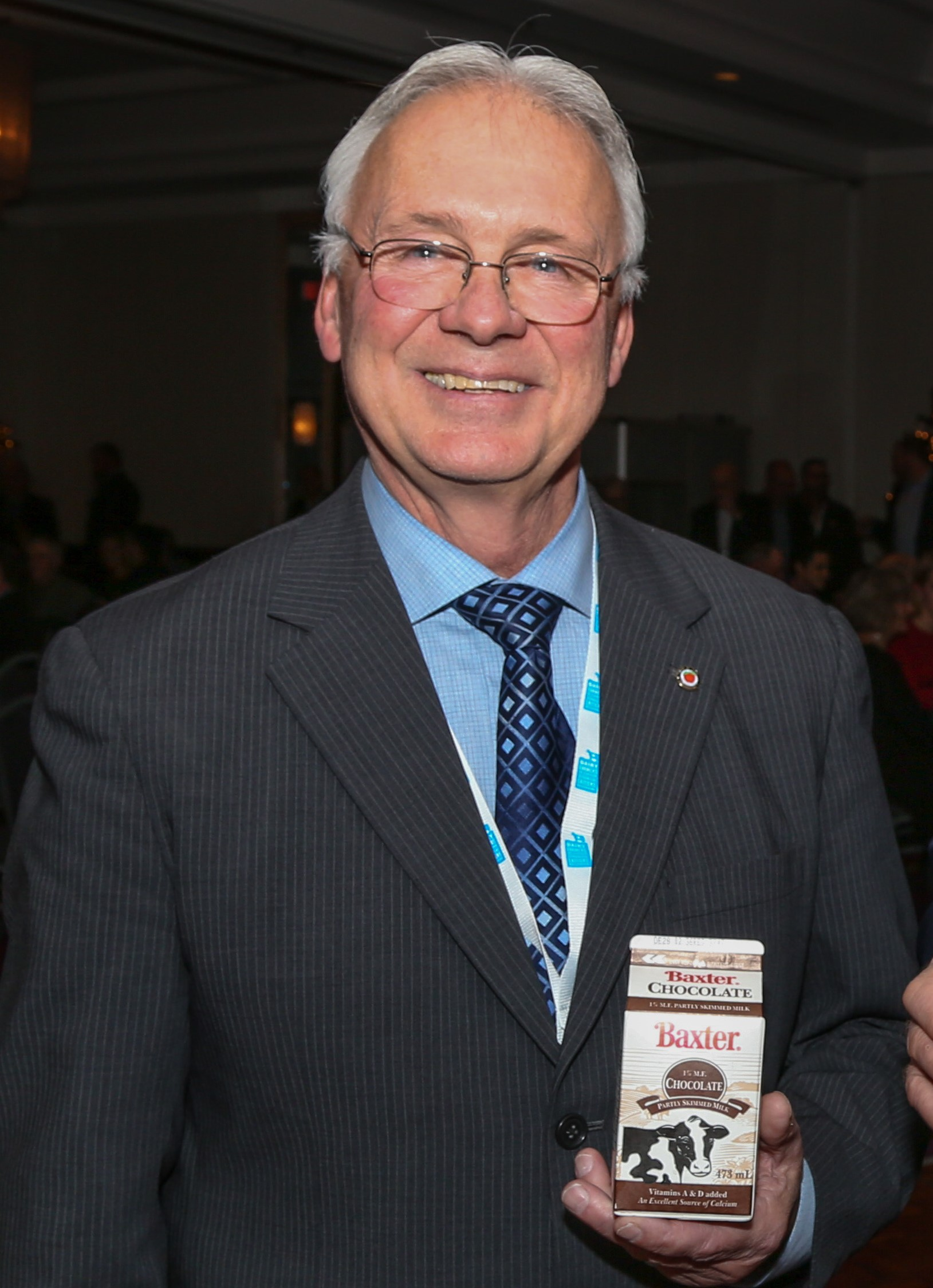
- Wetmore in 2018

Minister of Agriculture, Aquaculture, and Fisheries
- In office November 9, 2018 – September 29, 2020
- Premier: Blaine Higgs
- Preceded by: Andrew Harvey (Agriculture, Mines, and Rural Affairs); Benoît Bourque (Aquaculture and Fisheries)
- Succeeded by: Margaret Johnson

Member of the New Brunswick Legislative Assembly for Gagetown-Petitcodiac
- In office September 27, 2010 – September 19, 2024
- Preceded by: Eugene McGinley

Personal details
- Born: April 3, 1953 (age 72) Campbellton, New Brunswick, Canada
- Party: Progressive Conservative

Frederick Ross Wetmore (born April 3, 1953) is a Canadian politician who was elected to the Legislative Assembly of New Brunswick in the 2010 provincial election. He represented the electoral district of Gagetown-Petitcodiac (formerly Grand Lake-Gagetown) as a member of the Progressive Conservatives until 2024. From 2018 to 2020 he was Minister of Agriculture, Aquaculture, and Fisheries in the Higgs government.

Wetmore was born in Campbellton, New Brunswick. In 1979, he started a meat cutting business in Burton, and eventually expanded to a very successful grocery store in Gagetown.

Wetmore was named to the Select Committee on Cannabis, pursuant to Motion 31 of the 3rd session of the 58th New Brunswick Legislature.

Wetmore was re-elected in the 2014, 2018, and 2020 provincial elections. He did not stand in the 2024 provincial election.
