= Margaret Johnson (politician) =

Canadian politician

Margaret C. Johnson MLA
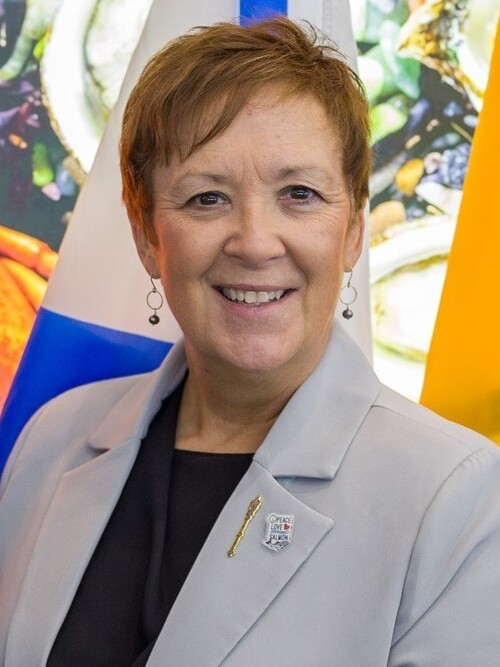
- Johnson in 2024

Leader of the Opposition of New Brunswick
- Incumbent
- Assumed office October 20, 2026
- Preceded by: Glen Savoie

Parliamentary leader of the Progressive Conservative Party of New Brunswick
- Incumbent
- Assumed office October 20, 2026
- Leader: Daniel Allain
- Preceded by: Glen Savoie (as interim leader)

Minister of Agriculture, Aquaculture, and Fisheries of New Brunswick
- In office September 29, 2020 – November 2, 2024
- Preceded by: Ross Wetmore
- Succeeded by: Pat Finnigan

Member of the Legislative Assembly for Carleton-Victoria
- Incumbent
- Assumed office September 14, 2020
- Preceded by: Andrew Harvey

Personal details
- Party: Progressive Conservative

Margaret C. Johnson is a Canadian Progressive Conservative politician who has represented Carleton-Victoria in the Legislative Assembly of New Brunswick since 2020.

== Political career ==
Johnson defeated incumbent Liberal MLA Andrew Harvey in 2020. Johnson had previously lost to Harvey in the 2018 New Brunswick general election. Johnson was a member of the cabinet of Blaine Higgs from 2020 to 2024 as Minister of Agriculture, Aquaculture, and Fisheries.

== Electoral history ==
2024 New Brunswick general election: Carleton-Victoria
Party	Candidate	Votes	%	±%
Progressive Conservative	Margaret Johnson	4,798	62.33	+17.33
Liberal	Julian Moulton	2,159	28.05	-9.95
Green	Rebecca Blaevoet	451	5.86	+0.26
Social Justice	Tasha Rossignol	290	3.77	
Total valid votes		7,698		
Total rejected ballots				
Turnout				
Eligible voters				
Source: Elections New Brunswick

2020 New Brunswick general election
Party	Candidate	Votes	%	±%
Progressive Conservative	Margaret C. Johnson	3,330	45.22	+7.14
Liberal	Andrew Harvey	2,939	39.91	-0.97
People's Alliance	Terry Leigh Sisson	610	8.28	-4.31
Green	Rowan Patrick Miller	372	5.05	-1.55
New Democratic	Meriet Gray Miller	113	1.53	+0.03
Total valid votes		7,364	99.72	
Total rejected ballots		21	0.28	
Turnout		7,385	64.39	
Eligible voters		11,469		
Progressive Conservative gain from Liberal		Swing		+4.06
Source: Elections New Brunswick

2018 New Brunswick general election
Party	Candidate	Votes	%	±%
Liberal	Andrew Harvey	3,116	40.88	+0.04
Progressive Conservative	Margaret C. Johnson	2,872	37.68	-2.09
People's Alliance	Terry Leigh Sisson	960	12.59	--
Green	Paula Shaw	503	6.60	+0.55
New Democratic	Margaret Geldart	114	1.50	-7.41
KISS	Carter Edgar	58	0.76	-2.06*
Total valid votes		7,623	99.90	
Total rejected ballots		8	0.10	-0.23
Turnout		7,631	65.60	+1.46
Eligible voters		11,632		
Liberal hold		Swing		+1.07
*Carter Edgar's vote share change compared to his run as an independent candidate in 2014.
Source: Elections New Brunswick
