= Ryan Cullins =

Canadian politician

Ryan Cullins MLA
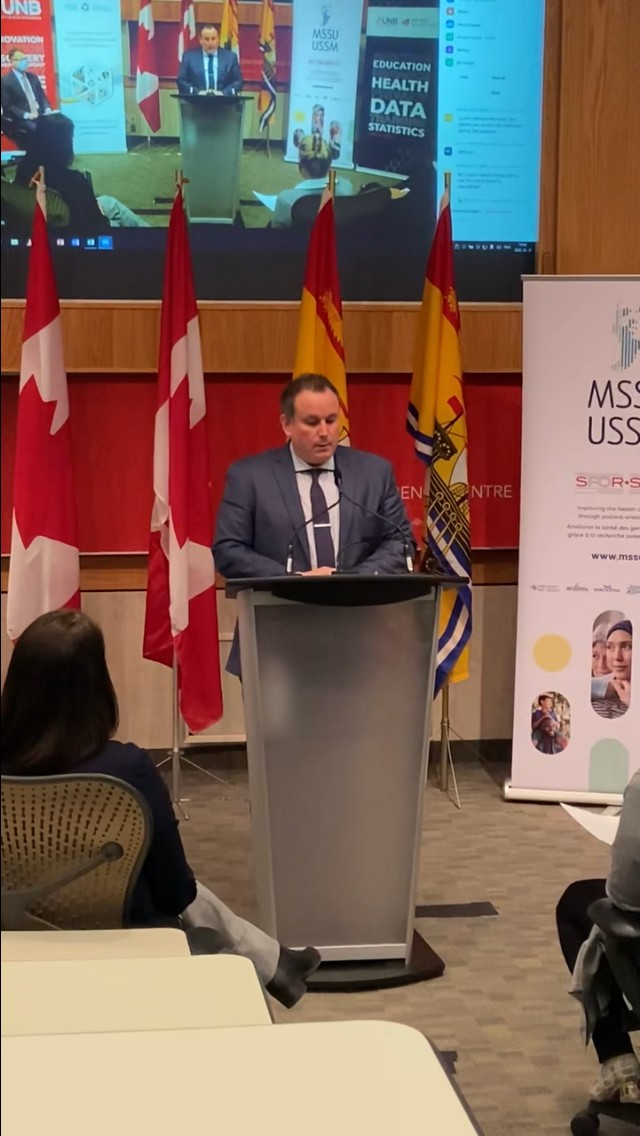

Member of the New Brunswick Legislative Assembly for Fredericton-York
- Incumbent
- Assumed office September 14, 2020
- Preceded by: Rick DeSaulniers

Personal details
- Party: Progressive Conservative

Ryan P. Cullins is a Canadian Progressive Conservative politician who has represented Fredericton-York in the Legislative Assembly of New Brunswick since 2020.

== Political career ==
Cullins defeated Rick DeSaulniers of the People's Alliance of New Brunswick in the 2020 general election. He will be running for re-election in the 2024 general election on October 21, 2024.

== Electoral record ==
=== Fredericton-York ===
2024 New Brunswick general election
Party	Candidate	Votes	%	±%
Progressive Conservative	Ryan Cullins	3,572	43.77	+1.36
Liberal	Tanya Whitney	2,527	30.96	+21.05
Green	Pam Allen-LeBlanc	1,673	20.50	-3.49
People's Alliance	Michael Broderick	256	3.14	-19.50
New Democratic	Steven J. LaForest	133	1.63	+0.86
Total valid votes		8,161	99.83	
Total rejected ballots		14	0.17	
Turnout		8,175	-	
Eligible voters		-		
Progressive Conservative hold		Swing		-9.85
Source: Elections New Brunswick

2020 New Brunswick general election
Party	Candidate	Votes	%	±%
Progressive Conservative	Ryan Cullins	3,730	42.41	+11.53
Green	Melissa Fraser	2,110	23.99	+8.50
People's Alliance	Rick DeSaulniers	1,991	22.64	-11.09
Liberal	Randy McKeen	872	9.91	-8.46
New Democratic	Steven J. LaForest	68	0.77	-0.38
KISS	Gerard Bourque	24	0.27	-0.11
Total valid votes		8,795	100.0	
Total rejected ballots		36	0.41	
Turnout		8,831	70.41	
Eligible voters		12,542		
Progressive Conservative gain from People's Alliance		Swing		+1.52
Source: Elections New Brunswick
