= 2020 New Brunswick general election =

Canadian provincial election

- September 14, 2020

49 seats in the Legislative Assembly of New Brunswick 25 seats needed for a majority
- Opinion polls
- Turnout: 66.14% (▼1.20 pp)
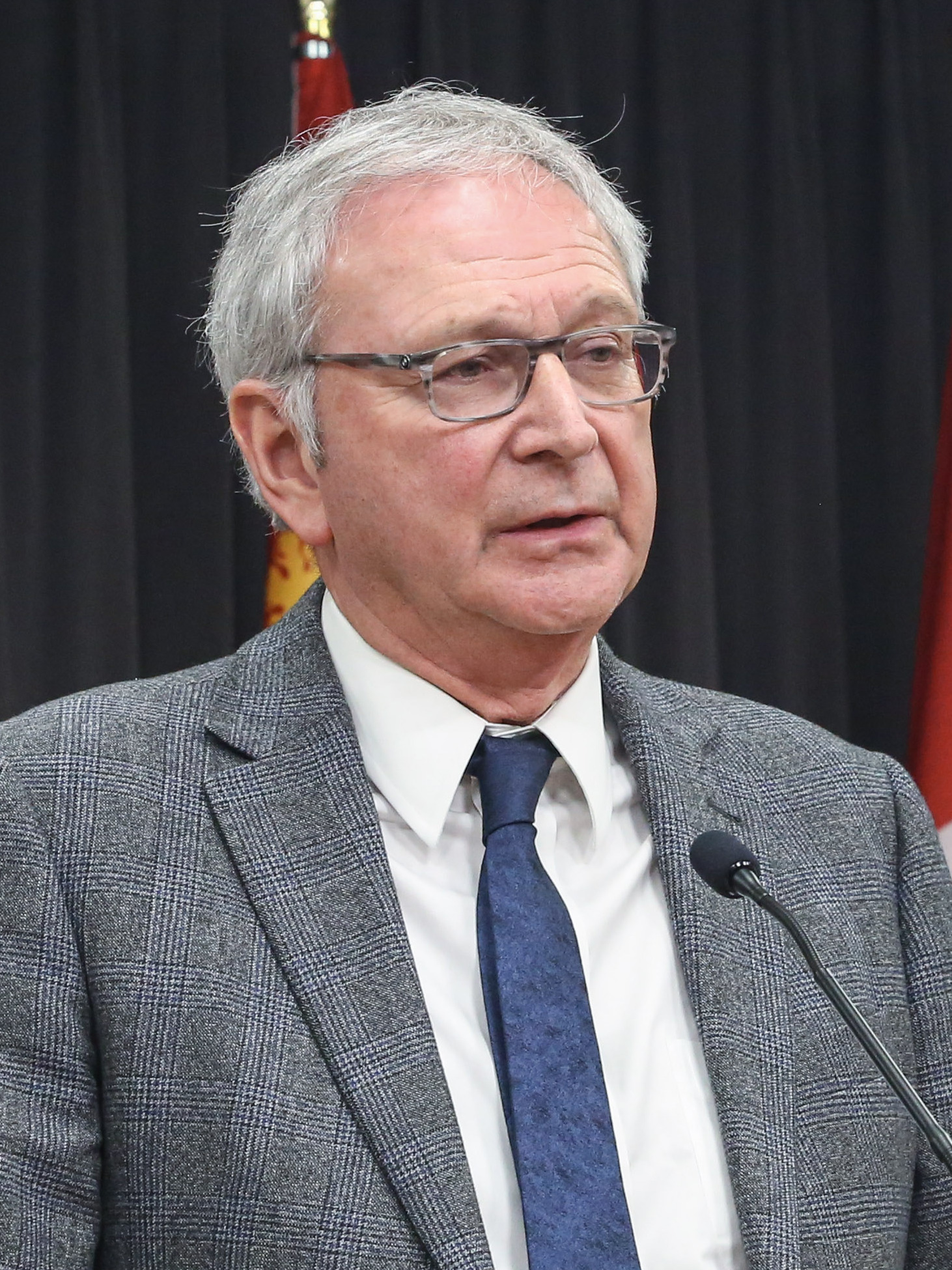

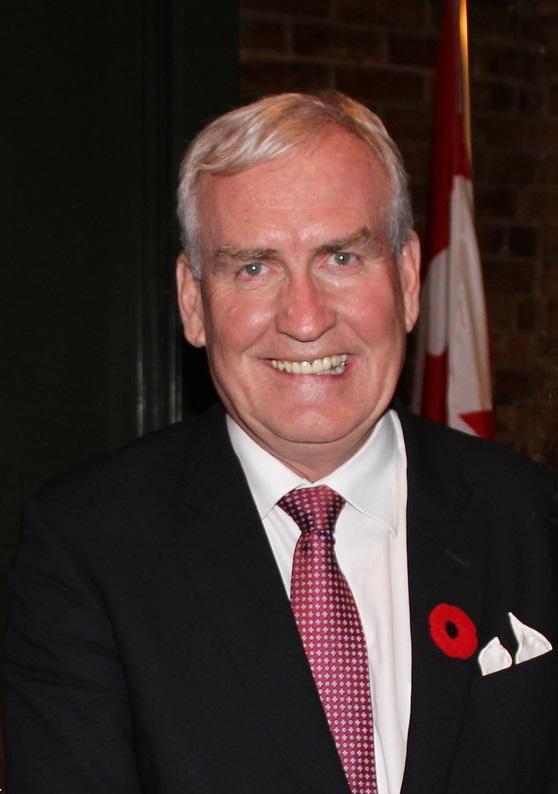

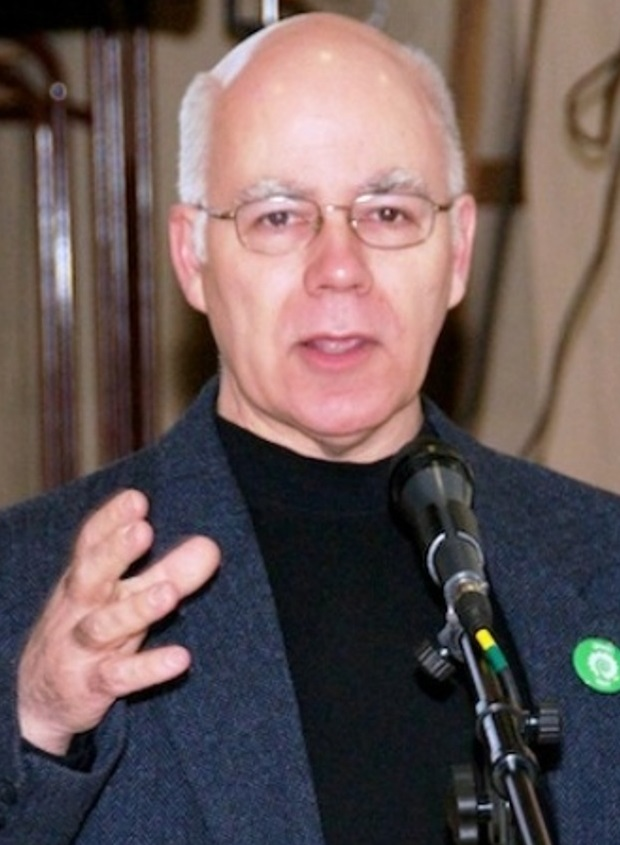

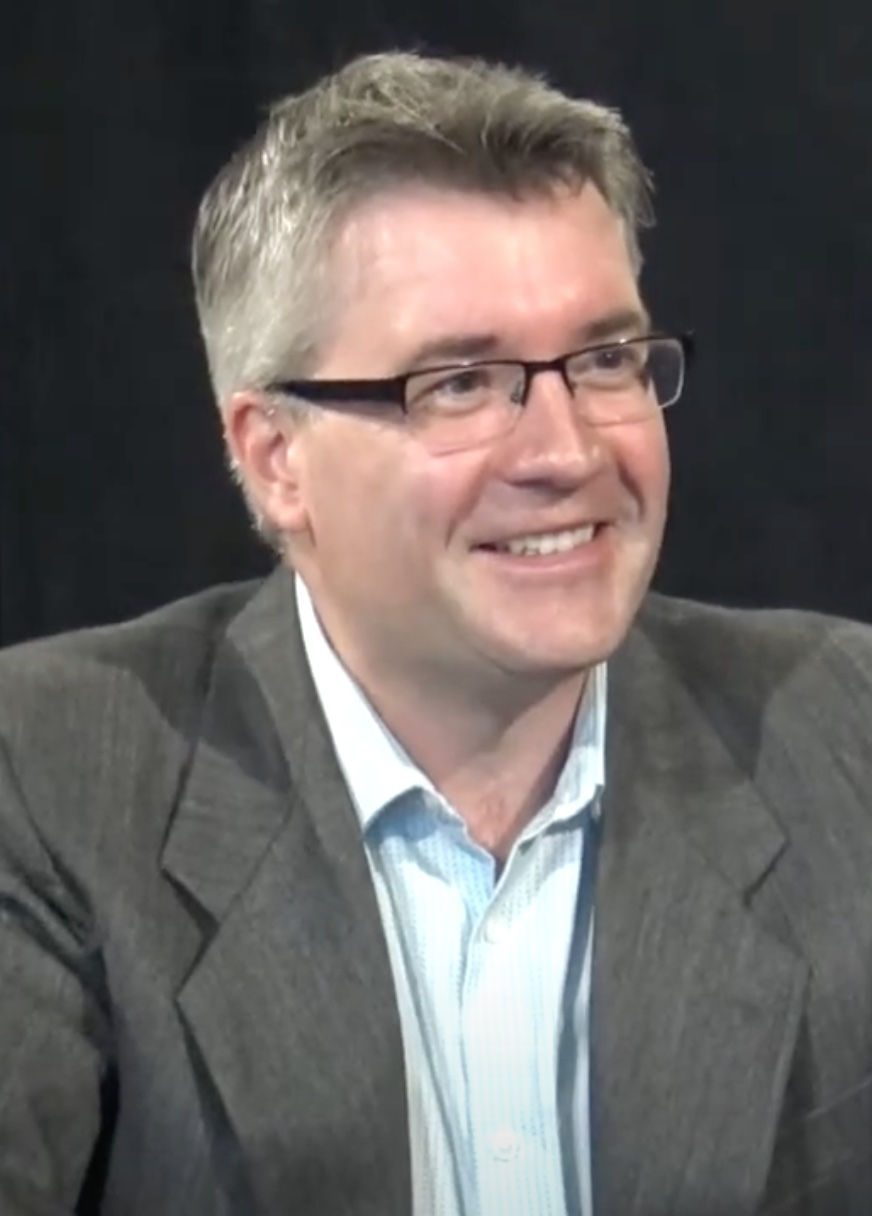
| | First party | Second party |
|---|---|---|
| Leader | Blaine Higgs | Kevin Vickers |
| Party | Progressive Conservative | Liberal |
| Leader since | October 22, 2016 | April 24, 2019 |
| Leader's seat | Quispamsis | Ran in Miramichi (lost) |
| Last election | 22 seats, 31.89% | 21 seats, 37.80% |
| Seats before | 20 | 20 |
| Seats won | 27 | 17 |
| Seat change | ▲7 | ▼3 |
| Popular vote | 147,790 | 129,025 |
| Percentage | 39.34% | 34.35% |
| Swing | ▲7.45% | ▼3.45% |
| | Third party | Fourth party |
| Leader | David Coon | Kris Austin |
| Party | Green | People's Alliance |
| Leader since | September 22, 2012 | June 5, 2010 |
| Leader's seat | Fredericton South | Fredericton-Grand Lake |
| Last election | 3 seats, 11.88% | 3 seats, 12.58% |
| Seats before | 3 | 3 |
| Seats won | 3 | 2 |
| Seat change | Steady | ▼1 |
| Popular vote | 57,252 | 34,526 |
| Percentage | 15.24% | 9.19% |
| Swing | ▲3.36% | ▼3.39% |
- Popular vote by riding. As this is an FPTP election, seat totals are determined by popular vote for each riding.
Premier before election
Blaine Higgs
Progressive Conservative
Premier after election
Blaine Higgs
Progressive Conservative

The 2020 New Brunswick general election was held on September 14, 2020, to elect members of the 60th New Brunswick Legislature. The Progressive Conservative Party of New Brunswick, led by Blaine Higgs, won a majority government.

The writs of election were issued by Lieutenant Governor Brenda Murphy on August 17, 2020, after a request was made by Premier Blaine Higgs to dissolve the legislature.

The election was scheduled to take place on October 17, 2022, as determined by the fixed-date provisions of the Legislative Assembly Act, which requires a general election to be held every four years on the third Monday in October. However, Premier Higgs called a snap election after negotiations failed with the other parties that would have avoided an election until the fixed date in 2022 or the end of the COVID-19 pandemic.

At 8:55 p.m. ADT, CBC News declared a Progressive Conservative majority government.

== Background ==
=== Aftermath of the 2018 election ===
The 2018 provincial election resulted in no party winning a majority of seats in the legislature for the first time since the 1920 provincial election. On election night, Blaine Higgs claimed victory for the Progressive Conservative Party, saying his team had received a mandate from New Brunswickers; however, Liberal Party leader and incumbent premier Brian Gallant stated his intention to remain in office with a minority government by securing support on a vote-by-vote basis. Over the following days, Lieutenant Governor Jocelyne Roy-Vienneau met with both leaders and gave permission to Gallant to continue in office and attempt to seek the confidence of the Legislative Assembly; while Higgs was told that if Gallant was unable to secure the confidence of the Assembly, Higgs would be called on to form government.

After the election, both Kris Austin of the People's Alliance and David Coon of the Green Party were noncommittal in their support. Gallant pursued a partnership with the Green Party and ruled out any arrangement with the Progressive Conservative Party or People's Alliance because Gallant did not believe that they shared the Liberal Party’s “values”. Higgs initially ruled out any formal agreements with other parties, but later said that a four-year agreement would be ideal for stability. On September 28, 2018, Austin agreed to support a Progressive Conservative minority government on a "bill-by-bill basis" for eighteen months, though no formal agreement was made.

On November 2, 2018, the Progressive Conservatives introduced a motion of no confidence in the Legislative Assembly, resulting in a 25–23 vote against the Liberals. Subsequently, Gallant resigned as Premier and recommended to the Lieutenant Governor that Higgs be given the opportunity to form government. Higgs' minority government was sworn into office on November 9, 2018.

On November 15, 2018, Gallant announced his resignation as leader of the Liberal Party. He was succeeded by Kevin Vickers on April 24, 2019.

=== Speculation of an early election ===
The PC minority government's seat total dropped to 20 after the death of MLA Greg Thompson on September 10, 2019 and the resignation of Deputy Premier Robert Gauvin on February 14, 2020. Gauvin's resignation came after the PC government announced health reforms, including the nightly closure of six hospital emergency rooms across the province as a cost reduction measure. Despite the Progressive Conservatives quickly backtracking on their proposals, the Liberals and the Greens said that they would not support the government at the next confidence vote, while the People's Alliance specifically did not rule out a vote of non-confidence. The next confidence vote was scheduled for March 20, 2020 to approve the PC government's proposed budget for the upcoming fiscal year; however, by that time, the People's Alliance decided to continue supporting the government and Green MLAs were allowed to vote freely on the budget. Furthermore, after COVID-19 was declared a pandemic on March 11, 2020, all parties decided to co-operate with each other—thus, avoiding a spring election.

By the summer, however, COVID-19 cases had stayed low for several weeks and Premier Blaine Higgs began to hint at the possibility of a fall election, arguing that stability was required for the next phase of the pandemic and economic recovery. The Progressive Conservatives carried out candidate riding nominations on August 8, 2020, continuing speculation of when an election might be called. On the following Monday, Higgs made an offer to the opposition parties to avoid an election until 2022 or the end of the pandemic; negotiations ultimately failed, however, and a snap election was called on August 17, 2020.

=== Summary of seat changes ===
Changes in seats held (2018–2020)
| Seat | Before | | | | Change | | |
| Seat | Date | Member | Party | Reason | Date | Member | Party |
|---|---|---|---|---|---|---|---|
| Saint Croix | 10 September 2019 | Greg Thompson | █ PC | Death | | | |
| Shediac Bay-Dieppe | 7 October 2019 | Brian Gallant | █ Liberal | Resignation | | | |
| Shippagan-Lamèque-Miscou | 14 February 2020 | Robert Gauvin | █ PC | Left the party | | | █ Independent |

== Results ==
Summary of the 2020 Legislative Assembly of New Brunswick election
| Party | Leader | Candidates | Votes | | | | Seats | | |
| Party | Leader | Candidates | # | ± | % | Change (pp) | 2018 | 2020 | ± |
|---|---|---|---|---|---|---|---|---|---|
| Progressive Conservative | Blaine Higgs | 49 | 147,790 | 26,490▲ | 39.34 | 7.45 | 22 | 27 / 49 | 5▲ |
| Liberal | Kevin Vickers | 49 | 129,025 | 14,766▼ | 34.35 | -3.46 | 21 | 17 / 49 | 4▼ |
| Green | David Coon | 47 | 57,252 | 12,066▲ | 15.24 | 3.36 | 3 | 3 / 49 | Steady |
| People's Alliance | Kris Austin | 36 | 34,526 | 13,334▼ | 9.19 | -3.39 | 3 | 2 / 49 | 1▼ |
| New Democratic | Mackenzie Thomason (Note: Interim leader) | 33 | 6,220 | 12,819▼ | 1.66 | -3.35 | | | |
| Independent | | 9 | 685 | 2,136▼ | 0.18 | -0.56 | | | |
| KISS | Gerald Bourque | 4 | 139 | 227▼ | 0.04 | -0.06 | | | |
| Total | | 227 | 375,637 | | 100.00% | | | | |
| Rejected ballots | | | 1,266 | 146▲ | | | | | |
| Turnout | | | 376,903 | 4,872▼ | 66.14% | 1.29▲ | | | |
| Registered voters | | | 569,862 | 18,809▼ | | | | | |

=== Synopsis of results ===
2020 New Brunswick general election - synopsis of riding results
| Riding | Winning party | | | | | | | Turnout | Votes | | | | | | | |
| Riding | 2018 | 1st place | Votes | Share | Margin # | Margin % | 2nd place | Turnout | PC | Lib | Green | PA | NDP | KISS | Ind | Total |
|---|---|---|---|---|---|---|---|---|---|---|---|---|---|---|---|---|
| Albert | PC | PC | 5,040 | 62.35% | 3,984 | 49.28% | Green | 63.2% | 5,040 | 921 | 1,056 | 977 | – | – | 90 | 8,084 |
| Bathurst East-Nepisiguit-Saint-Isidore | Lib | Lib | 4,163 | 63.76% | 2,595 | 39.75% | PC | 60.6% | 1,568 | 4,163 | 798 | – | – | – | – | 6,529 |
| Bathurst West-Beresford | Lib | Lib | 3,730 | 55.84% | 1,745 | 26.12% | PC | 61.2% | 1,985 | 3,730 | 965 | – | – | – | – | 6,680 |
| Campbellton-Dalhousie | Lib | Lib | 4,540 | 65.20% | 3,171 | 45.54% | PC | 63.6% | 1,369 | 4,540 | 1,054 | – | – | – | – | 6,963 |
| Caraquet | Lib | Lib | 5,928 | 72.27% | 4,638 | 56.54% | Green | 75.1% | 985 | 5,928 | 1,290 | – | – | – | – | 8,203 |
| Carleton | PC | PC | 3,536 | 47.87% | 1,627 | 22.03% | PA | 65.1% | 3,536 | 1,239 | 581 | 1,909 | 80 | 41 | – | 7,386 |
| Carleton-Victoria | Lib | PC | 3,330 | 45.22% | 391 | 5.31% | Lib | 63.5% | 3,330 | 2,939 | 372 | 610 | 113 | – | – | 7,364 |
| Carleton-York | PC | PC | 4,750 | 57.83% | 3,226 | 39.27% | PA | 66.5% | 4,750 | 940 | 890 | 1,524 | 110 | – | – | 8,214 |
| Dieppe | Lib | Lib | 4,564 | 60.16% | 2,884 | 38.02% | PC | 66.0% | 1,680 | 4,564 | 1,142 | – | 200 | – | – | 7,586 |
| Edmundston-Madawaska Centre | Lib | Lib | 5,236 | 74.47% | 3,856 | 54.84% | PC | 62.7% | 1,380 | 5,236 | 415 | – | – | – | – | 7,031 |
| Fredericton North | Lib | PC | 3,227 | 41.13% | 763 | 9.72% | Green | 66.3% | 3,227 | 1,464 | 2,464 | 591 | 100 | – | – | 7,846 |
| Fredericton South | Green | Green | 4,213 | 54.01% | 1,871 | 23.98% | PC | 67.4% | 2,342 | 895 | 4,213 | 234 | 117 | – | – | 7,801 |
| Fredericton West-Hanwell | PC | PC | 4,726 | 52.88% | 2,981 | 33.36% | Green | 70.5% | 4,726 | 1,510 | 1,745 | 825 | 131 | – | – | 8,937 |
| Fredericton-Grand Lake | PA | PA | 3,759 | 46.42% | 1,280 | 15.81% | PC | 69.0% | 2,479 | 749 | 1,005 | 3,759 | 87 | 18 | – | 8,097 |
| Fredericton-York | PA | PC | 3,730 | 42.41% | 1,620 | 18.42% | Green | 69.0% | 3,730 | 872 | 2,110 | 1,991 | 68 | 24 | – | 8,795 |
| Fundy-The Isles-Saint John West | PC | PC | 4,740 | 66.47% | 4,014 | 56.29% | Lib | 61.8% | 4,740 | 726 | 686 | 688 | 291 | – | – | 7,131 |
| Gagetown-Petitcodiac | PC | PC | 4,773 | 59.09% | 3,470 | 42.96% | PA | 67.3% | 4,773 | 867 | 1,003 | 1,303 | 131 | – | – | 8,077 |
| Hampton | PC | PC | 4,351 | 60.52% | 3,267 | 45.44% | Lib | 60.2% | 4,351 | 1,084 | 816 | 687 | 251 | – | – | 7,189 |
| Kent North | Green | Green | 4,021 | 47.47% | 1,088 | 12.84% | Lib | 68.3% | 1,363 | 2,933 | 4,021 | – | – | – | 154 | 8,471 |
| Kent South | Lib | Lib | 5,148 | 55.22% | 2,331 | 25.01% | PC | 73.9% | 2,817 | 5,148 | 996 | 243 | 118 | – | – | 9,322 |
| Kings Centre | PC | PC | 4,583 | 61.54% | 3,577 | 48.03% | Green | 64.9% | 4,583 | 911 | 1,006 | 693 | 254 | – | – | 7,447 |
| Madawaska Les Lacs-Edmundston | Lib | Lib | 4,583 | 66.54% | 2,820 | 40.94% | PC | 61.1% | 1,763 | 4,583 | 542 | – | – | – | – | 6,888 |
| Memramcook-Tantramar | Green | Green | 3,425 | 41.61% | 523 | 6.35% | Lib | 67.1% | 1,678 | 2,902 | 3,425 | 192 | – | – | 34 | 8,231 |
| Miramichi | PA | PA | 3,527 | 45.11% | 1,288 | 16.47% | Lib | 70.9% | 1,508 | 2,239 | 398 | 3,527 | 92 | – | 54 | 7,818 |
| Miramichi Bay-Neguac | Lib | Lib | 3,561 | 43.56% | 810 | 9.91% | PC | 67.7% | 2,751 | 3,561 | 825 | 898 | 139 | – | – | 8,174 |
| Moncton Centre | Lib | Lib | 2,448 | 38.91% | 723 | 11.49% | Green | 58.4% | 1,642 | 2,448 | 1,725 | 308 | 168 | – | – | 6,291 |
| Moncton East | Lib | PC | 3,525 | 45.17% | 766 | 9.82% | Lib | 62.3% | 3,525 | 2,759 | 989 | 378 | 153 | – | – | 7,804 |
| Moncton Northwest | PC | PC | 4,111 | 51.50% | 1,663 | 20.83% | Lib | 62.6% | 4,111 | 2,448 | 702 | 493 | 229 | – | – | 7,983 |
| Moncton South | Lib | PC | 2,734 | 42.09% | 768 | 11.82% | Lib | 57.9% | 2,734 | 1,966 | 1,245 | 331 | 220 | – | – | 6,496 |
| Moncton Southwest | PC | PC | 3,679 | 52.13% | 2,118 | 30.01% | Lib | 57.8% | 3,679 | 1,561 | 927 | 667 | 224 | – | – | 7,058 |
| New Maryland-Sunbury | PC | PC | 5,342 | 57.76% | 3,879 | 41.94% | Green | 67.7% | 5,342 | 1,048 | 1,463 | 1,254 | 141 | – | – | 9,248 |
| Oromocto-Lincoln-Fredericton | PC | PC | 3,374 | 44.25% | 1,302 | 17.08% | Lib | 61.9% | 3,374 | 2,072 | 1,306 | 745 | 127 | – | – | 7,624 |
| Portland-Simonds | PC | PC | 3,170 | 55.10% | 1,516 | 26.35% | Lib | 52.1% | 3,170 | 1,654 | 483 | 282 | 164 | – | – | 5,753 |
| Quispamsis | PC | PC | 5,697 | 68.11% | 4,472 | 53.46% | Lib | 68.7% | 5,697 | 1,225 | 528 | 414 | 501 | – | – | 8,365 |
| Restigouche West | Lib | Lib | 5,022 | 62.15% | 3,267 | 40.43% | Green | 70.2% | 1,247 | 5,022 | 1,755 | – | – | 56 | – | 8,080 |
| Restigouche-Chaleur | Lib | Lib | 3,823 | 55.66% | 1,927 | 28.06% | Green | 61.8% | 1,149 | 3,823 | 1,896 | – | – | – | – | 6,868 |
| Riverview | PC | PC | 4,695 | 60.08% | 3,414 | 43.69% | Lib | 65.0% | 4,695 | 1,281 | 800 | 778 | 261 | – | – | 7,815 |
| Rothesay | PC | PC | 4,265 | 61.28% | 2,802 | 40.26% | Lib | 62.3% | 4,265 | 1,463 | 719 | 413 | – | – | 100 | 6,960 |
| Saint Croix | PC | PC | 3,570 | 45.18% | 1,024 | 12.96% | PA | 64.7% | 3,570 | 401 | 1,238 | 2,546 | 147 | – | – | 7,902 |
| Saint John East | PC | PC | 3,507 | 56.36% | 1,868 | 30.02% | Lib | 55.2% | 3,507 | 1,639 | 394 | 434 | 248 | – | – | 6,222 |
| Saint John Harbour | Lib | PC | 2,181 | 41.40% | 957 | 18.17% | Green | 48.2% | 2,181 | 1,207 | 1,224 | 186 | 309 | – | 161 | 5,268 |
| Saint John Lancaster | PC | PC | 3,560 | 54.24% | 2,089 | 31.83% | Lib | 62.7% | 3,560 | 1,471 | 938 | 394 | 201 | – | – | 6,564 |
| Shediac Bay-Dieppe | Lib | Lib | 5,839 | 60.14% | 2,868 | 29.54% | PC | 70.2% | 2,971 | 5,839 (Note: Robert Gauvin was previously elected as the PC MLA for Shippagan-Lamèque-Miscou.) | – | 371 | 528 | – | – | 9,709 |
| Shediac-Beaubassin-Cap-Pelé | Lib | Lib | 4,949 | 53.67% | 2,496 | 27.07% | Green | 70.0% | 1,820 | 4,949 | 2,453 | – | – | – | – | 9,222 |
| Shippagan-Lamèque-Miscou | PC | Lib | 6,834 | 83.78% | 6,120 | 75.03% | PC | 74.1% | 714 | 6,834 | 609 | – | – | – | – | 8,157 |
| Southwest Miramichi-Bay du Vin | PC | PC | 3,887 | 47.97% | 1,619 | 19.98% | PA | 71.9% | 3,887 | 1,760 | – | 2,268 | 188 | – | – | 8,103 |
| Sussex-Fundy-St. Martins | PC | PC | 4,366 | 56.29% | 3,045 | 39.26% | PA | 63.9% | 4,366 | 971 | 969 | 1,321 | 129 | – | – | 7,756 |
| Tracadie-Sheila | Lib | Lib | 6,175 | 69.55% | 4,116 | 46.36% | PC | 74.6% | 2,059 | 6,175 | 645 | – | – | – | – | 8,879 |
| Victoria-La Vallée | Lib | Lib | 4,365 | 60.24% | 2,294 | 31.66% | PC | 64.4% | 2,071 | 4,365 | 426 | 292 | – | – | 92 | 7,246 |

= Francophone-majority constituency
= Open seat
= Turnout is above provincial average
= Winning candidate was in previous Legislature
= Incumbent had switched allegiance
= Previously incumbent in another riding
= Not incumbent; was previously elected to the Legislature
= Incumbency arose from byelection gain
= Other incumbents renominated
= Previously an MP in the House of Commons of Canada
= Multiple candidates

=== Incumbent MLAs who were defeated ===
| Party | Name | Riding | Year elected | Seat held by party since | Defeated by | Party |
|---|---|---|---|---|---|---|
| Liberal | Monique LeBlanc | Moncton East | 2014 | 2014 | Daniel Allain | Progressive Conservative |
| Liberal | Stephen Horsman | Fredericton North | 2014 | 2014 | Jill Green | Progressive Conservative |
| Liberal | Andrew Harvey | Carleton-Victoria | 2014 | 2014 | Margaret Johnson | Progressive Conservative |
| People's Alliance | Rick DeSaulniers | Fredericton-York | 2018 | 2018 | Ryan Cullins | Progressive Conservative |

=== Results by region ===
| Party name | | Northern | Miramichi | Southeastern | Southern | Capital Region | Upper River Valley | Total |
|---|---|---|---|---|---|---|---|---|
| Progressive; Conservative | Seats | 0 | 1 | 7 | 11 | 6 | 2 | 27 |
| Progressive; Conservative | Popular vote | 18.35% | 33.81% | 37.92% | 57.46% | 45.03% | 33.63% | 39.34% |
| Liberal | Seats | 8 | 1 | 5 | – | – | 3 | 17 |
| Liberal | Popular vote | 66.63% | 31.38% | 36.19% | 16.66% | 14.35% | 51.13% | 34.35% |
| Green | Seats | – | – | 2 | – | 1 | – | 3 |
| Green | Popular vote | 14.93% | 5.08% | 18.26% | 11.76% | 22.83% | 6.50% | 15.24% |
| People's Alliance | Seats | – | 1 | – | – | 1 | – | 2 |
| People's Alliance | Popular vote | 0.00% | 27.78% | 5.39% | 10.53% | 16.41% | 7.83% | 9.19% |
| New Democratic | Seats | – | – | – | – | – | – | – |
| New Democratic | Popular vote | 0.00% | 1.74% | 1.99% | 3.26% | 1.32% | 0.54% | 1.66% |
| Other | Seats | – | – | – | – | – | – | – |
| Other | Popular vote | 0.09% | 0.22% | 0.25% | 0.34% | 0.06% | 0.37% | 0.22% |
| Total seats | | 8 | 3 | 14 | 11 | 8 | 5 | 49 |

=== Detailed analysis ===
Position attained in seats contested
| Party | Seats | Second | Third | Fourth |
|---|---|---|---|---|
| Liberal | 17 | 17 | 9 | 6 |
| Progressive Conservative | 27 | 14 | 8 | – |
| Green | 3 | 12 | 24 | 8 |
| People's Alliance | 2 | 6 | 7 | 18 |
| New Democratic | – | – | 1 | 5 |
| Other | – | – | – | 2 |

Principal races, according to 1st and 2nd-place results
| Parties | | Seats |
|---|---|---|
| █ Progressive Conservative | █ Liberal | 26 |
| █ Progressive Conservative | █ Green | 8 |
| █ Progressive Conservative | █ People's Alliance | 7 |
| █ Liberal | █ Green | 7 |
| █ People's Alliance | █ Liberal | 1 |
| Total | | 49 |

== Campaign ==
=== Election call and initial reaction ===
At his election announcement, Progressive Conservative leader Blaine Higgs blamed the Liberals for the failure of negotiations that would have avoided an election until 2022 or the end of the pandemic. In response, Liberal leader Kevin Vickers and Green Party leader David Coon criticized Higgs for calling an election during a pandemic. Vickers insisted that the negotiations would have given unlimited power to Higgs and the PCs, and an election should have been held after the end of the pandemic. Meanwhile, People's Alliance leader Kris Austin asked New Brunswickers to vote for his party to ensure accountability of the next government by electing another minority legislature.

=== Impact of COVID-19 ===
From the outset of the campaign, Higgs was asked about the potential impact of COVID-19 on the election. He initially caused confusion when he said that he would be able to suspend the election, if necessary, even though New Brunswick's Chief Electoral Officer Kim Poffenroth said that an election could not be stopped after it had been called. Additionally, Higgs suggested that he could turn to the COVID-19 emergency order declared by the province under the Emergency Measures Act (EMA), despite the fact that election timelines are exempt from the EMA. However, he remained firm that he did not intend to suspend the election. Higgs also shared that, because of COVID-19, PC candidates were instructed to avoid door-to-door campaigning and mailbox flyers during the election.

=== Candidate controversies ===
Roland Michaud, PC candidate in Victoria-La Vallée, was ordered to withdraw from the election by Blaine Higgs after a transphobic meme posted on Michaud's Facebook page became public; Michaud chose to remain and run as an independent. He remained on the ballot with his original affiliation because the papers had already been printed, as did other repudiated candidates.

John Wayne Gardner, Liberal candidate in Saint Croix, was ousted by party leader Kevin Vickers after an anti-LGBTQ2I tweet from 2017 came to light; Gardner announced later the same day that he would continue to run as an independent.

Louis Bérubé, PC candidate in Restigouche West, was allowed to remain as party candidate after transphobic social media comments mentioned in a 2016 Acadie Nouvelle story resurfaced. The party cited Bérubé's earlier apologies for his comments and his successful vetting before running for the Green Party in the 2019 election as reasons for his retention.

Heathere Collins, PANB candidate in Memramcook-Tantramar, was dropped by party leader Kris Austin after 2019 anti-Muslim Tweets came to light. The candidate, whose Elections NB registration disagreed with her Twitter account about how to spell her first name, remained in the election.

== Opinion polls ==
Voting Intentions in New Brunswick since the 2018 Election

| Polling firm | Last day of polling | Link | PC | Liberal | PA | Green | NDP |
| Election 2020 | September 14, 2020 | HTML | 39.34 | 34.35 | 9.19 | 15.24 | 1.66 |
| Forum Research Inc. | September 13, 2020 | HTML | 37 | 30 | 8 | 21 | 4 |
| Mainstreet Research | September 12, 2020 | HTML | 37 | 30 | 7 | 21 | 4 |
| EKOS | September 12, 2020 | HTML | 32 | 32 | 10 | 18 | 4 |
| Oraclepoll Research | September 3, 2020 | PDF | 42 | 33 | 2 | 18 | 6 |
| MQO Research | August 30, 2020 | HTML | 43 | 27 | 5 | 17 | 6 |
| Mainstreet Research | August 27, 2020 | PDF | 38 | 32 | 7 | 19 | 4 |
| Leger/Acadie Nouvelle | August 26, 2020 | PDF | 40 | 32 | 7 | 13 | 6 |
| Narrative Research | August 23, 2020 | HTML | 44 | 33 | 2 | 14 | 7 |
| Angus Reid | May 24, 2020 | HTML | 39 | 26 | 13 | 17 | 4 |
| Narrative Research | May 20, 2020 | HTML | 48 | 30 | 3 | 15 | 5 |
| Innovative Research Group | May 7, 2020 | PDF | 33 | 37 | 6 | 13 | 10 |
| Narrative Research | March 12, 2020 | HTML | 39 | 28 | 4 | 20 | 8 |
| MQO Research | February 27, 2020 | PDF | 37 | 31 | 4 | 21 | 4 |
| Narrative Research | November 22, 2019 | HTML | 37 | 31 | 3 | 21 | 7 |
| Narrative Research | August 23, 2019 | PDF | 36 | 29 | 8 | 18 | 6 |
| Narrative Research | June 13, 2019 | HTML | 42 | 25 | 6 | 18 | 8 |
| MQO Research | May 6, 2019 | PDF | 40 | 30 | 5 | 20 | 3 |
| 24 April 2019 | Kevin Vickers becomes leader of the Liberal Party | | | | | | |
| Corporate Research Associates | February 19, 2019 | PDF | 42 | 29 | 9 | 14 | 6 |
| MQO Research | February 10, 2019 | PDF | 46 | 32 | 8 | 11 | 3 |
| Mainstreet Research | January 15, 2019 | HTML | 40.2 | 27.3 | 12.4 | 15 | 4.5 |
| Corporate Research Associates | November 24, 2018 | PDF | 30 | 35 | 12 | 17 | 6 |
| 9 November 2018 | Blaine Higgs is sworn in as Premier of New Brunswick leading a PC minority government, following the resignation of Brian Gallant and his Liberal minority government. | | | | | | |
| MQO Research | November 5, 2018 | PDF | 36 | 29 | 11 | 21 | 3 |
| 2 November 2018 | Premier Brian Gallant's Liberal minority government loses a non-confidence vote | | | | | | |
| Mainstreet Research | November 2, 2018 | HTML | 33.7 | 33.7 | 12.7 | 15.7 | 3 |
| Election 2018 | September 24, 2018 | HTML | 31.89 | 37.80 | 12.58 | 11.88 | 5.01 |

== Candidates ==
=== Retiring incumbents ===
The following sitting MLAs have announced that they would not seek re-election:

- Brian Kenny, Liberal MLA for Bathurst West-Beresford since 2014, and previously MLA for Bathurst from 2003 to 2014.
- Bruce Northrup, Progressive Conservative MLA for Sussex-Fundy-St. Martins since 2014, and previously MLA for Kings East from 2006 to 2014.
- Gerry Lowe, Liberal MLA for Saint John Harbour since 2018.
- Carl Urquhart, Progressive Conservative MLA for Carleton-York since 2014, and previously MLA for York from 2006 to 2014.
- Stewart Fairgrieve, Progressive Conservative MLA for Carleton since 2015.

Legend

- **bold** denotes cabinet minister, speaker or party leader
- † denotes an incumbent who is not running for re-election or was defeated in nomination contest
- # denotes an incumbent seeking re-election in a new district

NOTE: Candidates' names are as registered with Elections New Brunswick

=== Northern ===
| Electoral district | Candidates | | | | | | Incumbent |
| Electoral district | Progressive Conservatives | Liberal | Green | PANB | NDP | Other | Incumbent |
|---|---|---|---|---|---|---|---|
| Restigouche West | Louis Bérubé; 1247; 15.4% | Gilles LePage; 5022; 62.2% | Charles Thériault; 1755; 21.7% | | | Travis Pollock (KISS); 56; 0.7% | Gilles LePage |
| Campbellton-Dalhousie | Charles D. Stewart; 1369; 19.7% | Guy H. Arseneault; 4540; 65.2% | Marie-Christine Allard; 1054; 15.1% | | | | Guy Arseneault |
| Restigouche-Chaleur | Louis Robichaud; 1149; 16.7% | **Daniel Guitard**; 3823; 55.7% | Marie Larivière; 1896; 27.6% | | | | **Daniel Guitard** |
| Bathurst West-Beresford | Anne Bard-Lavigne; 1985; 29.7% | René Legacy; 3730; 55.8% | Pierre Duguay-Boudreau; 965; 14.4% | | | | Brian Kenny† |
| Bathurst East-Nepisiguit-Saint-Isidore | Amanda Keast; 1568; 24.0% | Denis Landry; 4163; 63.8% | Robert Kryzsko; 798; 12.2% | | | | Denis Landry |
| Caraquet | Kevin J. Haché; 985; 12.0% | Isabelle Thériault; 5928; 72.3% | Marie-Christine Haché; 1290; 15.7% | | | | Isabelle Thériault |
| Shippagan-Lamèque-Miscou | Jean-Gérard Chiasson; 714; 8.8% | Eric Mallet; 6834; 83.8% | Marie Leclerc; 609; 7.5% | | | | Robert Gauvin# |
| Tracadie-Sheila | Diane Carey; 2059; 23.2% | Keith Chiasson; 6175; 69.5% | Chris LeBlanc; 645; 7.3% | | | | Keith Chiasson |

=== Miramichi ===
| Electoral district | Candidates | | | | | | Incumbent |
| Electoral district | Progressive Conservatives | Liberal | Green | PANB | NDP | Other | Incumbent |
|---|---|---|---|---|---|---|---|
| Miramichi Bay-Neguac | Robert Trevors; 2751; 33.7% | Lisa Harris; 3561; 43.6% | Curtis Bartibogue; 825; 10.1% | Thomas L'Huillier; 898; 11.0% | Douglas Mullin; 139; 1.7% | | Lisa Harris |
| Miramichi | Charles Barry; 1508; 19.3% | **Kevin Vickers**; 2239; 28.6% | Joshua Shaddick; 398; 5.1% | Michelle Conroy; 3527; 45.1% | Eileen Clancy Teslenko; 92; 1.2% | Tristan Sutherland (Ind.); 54; 0.7% | Michelle Conroy |
| Southwest Miramichi-Bay du Vin | **Jake Stewart**; 3887; 48.0% | Josh McCormack; 1760; 21.7% | | Art O'Donnell; 2268; 28.0% | Glenna Hanley; 188; 2.3% | | **Jake Stewart** |

=== Southeastern ===
| Electoral district | Candidates | | | | | | Incumbent |
| Electoral district | Progressive Conservatives | Liberal | Green | PANB | NDP | Other | Incumbent |
|---|---|---|---|---|---|---|---|
| Kent North | Stephen Robertson; 1363; 16.1% | Bertrand LeBlanc; 2933; 34.6% | Kevin Arseneau; 4021; 47.5% | | | Roger Richard (Ind.); 154; 1.8% | Kevin Arseneau |
| Kent South | Raymond (Bou) Duplessis; 2817; 30.2% | Benoit Bourque; 5148; 55.2% | Eva P. Rehak; 996; 10.7% | Lisa Godin; 243; 2.6% | Sue Shedd; 118; 1.3% | | Benoît Bourque |
| Shediac Bay-Dieppe | Mathieu Gérald Caissie; 2971; 30.6% | Robert Gauvin; 5839; 60.1% | | Phillip Coombes; 371; 3.8% | Delphine Daigle; 528; 5.4% | | Vacant |
| Shediac-Beaubassin-Cap-Pelé | Marie-Paule Martin; 1820; 19.7% | Jacques LeBlanc; 4949; 53.7% | Gilles Cormier; 2453; 26.6% | | | | Jacques LeBlanc |
| Memramcook-Tantramar | Carole Duguay; 1678; 20.4% | Maxime Bourgeois; 2902; 35.3% | Megan Mitton; 3425; 41.6% | Heathere Collins (Note: Candidate was publicly repudiated by his or her party but chose to remain in the election. Because ballot papers had already been printed candidate retained his or her original listed affiliation.); 192; 2.3% | | Jefferson George Wright (Ind.); 34; 0.4% | Megan Mitton |
| Dieppe | Patricia Arsenault; 1680; 22.1% | Roger Melanson; 4564; 60.2% | Mélyssa Boudreau; 1142; 15.1% | | Pamela Boudreau; 200; 2.6% | | Roger Melanson |
| Moncton East | Daniel Allain; 3525; 45.2% | Monique LeBlanc; 2759; 35.4% | Phylomène Zangio; 989; 12.7% | Michel Norman Guitare; 378; 4.8% | Christopher Wanamaker; 153; 2.0% | | Monique LeBlanc |
| Moncton Centre | Jean Poirier; 1642; 26.1% | Rob McKee; 2448; 38.9% | Carole Chan; 1725; 27.4% | Aaron Richter; 308; 4.9% | James Caldwell; 168; 2.7% | | Rob McKee |
| Moncton South | Greg Turner; 2734; 42.1% | Tyson Milner; 1966; 30.3% | Josephine Watson; 1245; 19.2% | Marilyn Crossman-Riel; 331; 5.1% | Rebecca Rogers; 220; 3.4% | | Cathy Rogers† |
| Moncton Northwest | **Ernie Steeves**; 4111; 51.5% | Mark Black; 2448; 30.7% | Laura Sanderson; 702; 8.8% | Shawn Soucoup; 493; 6.2% | Cyprien Okana; 229; 2.9% | | **Ernie Steeves** |
| Moncton Southwest | **Sherry Wilson**; 3679; 52.1% | René Ephestion; 1561; 22.1% | Claire Kelly; 927; 13.1% | Susan Matthews; 667; 9.5% | Juliana McIntosh; 224; 3.2% | | **Sherry Wilson** |
| Riverview | **R. Bruce Fitch**; 4695; 60.1% | Heath Johnson; 1281; 16.4% | Rachel Pletz; 800; 10.2% | Troy Berteit; 778; 10.0% | John Nuttall; 261; 3.3% | | **R. Bruce Fitch** |
| Albert | **Mike Holland**; 5040; 62.3% | Kelley Nagle; 921; 11.4% | Jenny O'Neill; 1056; 13.1% | Sharon Buchanan; 977; 12.1% | | James Wilson (Ind.); 90; 1.1% | **Mike Holland** |
| Gagetown-Petitcodiac | **Ross Wetmore**; 4773; 59.1% | John (Jake) Urquhart; 867; 10.7% | Marilyn Merritt-Gray; 1003; 12.4% | Craig Dykeman; 1303; 16.1% | Ryan Jewkes; 131; 1.6% | | **Ross Wetmore** |

=== Southern ===
| Electoral district | Candidates | | | | | | Incumbent |
| Electoral district | Progressive Conservatives | Liberal | Green | PANB | NDP | Other | Incumbent |
|---|---|---|---|---|---|---|---|
| Sussex-Fundy-St. Martins | Tammy Scott-Wallace; 4366; 56.3% | Cully Robinson; 971; 12.5% | Tim Thompson; 969; 12.5% | Jim Bedford; 1321; 17.0% | Jonas Lanz; 129; 1.7% | | Bruce Northrup† |
| Hampton | Gary E. Crossman; 4351; 60.5% | Carley Parish; 1084; 15.1% | John Carl Sabine; 816; 11.4% | Sharon Bradley-Munn; 687; 9.6% | Alex White; 251; 3.5% | | Gary Crossman |
| Quispamsis | **Blaine M. Higgs**; 5697; 68.1% | Robert Hunt; 1225; 14.6% | Addison Fach; 528; 6.3% | Sara Hall; 414; 4.9% | Caitlin Grogan; 501; 6.0% | | **Blaine Higgs** |
| Rothesay | **Hugh J. (Ted) Flemming**; 4265; 61.3% | Jason Hickey; 1463; 21.0% | Ann McAllister; 719; 10.3% | Mike Griffin; 413; 5.9% | | Neville (NB) Barnett (Ind.); 44; 0.6% Liz Kramer (Ind.); 56; 0.6% | **Ted Flemming** |
| Saint John East | **Glen Savoie**; 3507; 56.4% | Phil Comeau; 1639; 26.3% | Gerald Irish; 394; 6.3% | Patrick Kemp; 434; 7.0% | Josh Floyd; 248; 4.0% | | **Glen Savoie** |
| Portland-Simonds | **Trevor A. Holder**; 3170; 55.1% | Tim Jones; 1654; 28.8% | Stefan Warner; 483; 8.4% | Darella (Lindsay) Jackson; 282; 4.9% | Erik Heinze-Milne; 164; 2.9% | | **Trevor Holder** |
| Saint John Harbour | Arlene Dunn; 2181; 41.4% | Alice (Ms McKim) McKim; 1207; 22.9% | Brent Harris; 1224; 23.2% | Tony Gunn; 186; 3.5% | Courtney Pyrke; 309; 5.9% | Mike (Dok) Cyr (Ind.); 47; 0.9% Arty Watson (Ind.); 114; 2.2% | Gerry Lowe† |
| Saint John Lancaster | **K. Dorothy Shephard**; 3560; 54.2% | Sharon Teare; 1471; 22.4% | Joanna Killen; 938; 14.3% | Paul Seelye; 394; 6.0% | Don Durant; 201; 3.1% | | **Dorothy Shephard** |
| Kings Centre | **Bill Oliver**; 4583; 61.5% | Paul Adams; 911; 12.2% | Bruce Dryer; 1006; 13.5% | William Edgett; 693; 9.3% | Margaret Anderson Kilfoil; 254; 3.4% | | **Bill Oliver** |
| Fundy-The Isles-Saint John West | **Andrea Anderson-Mason**; 4740; 66.5% | Tony Mann; 726; 10.2% | Lois P. Mitchell; 686; 9.6% | Vincent P. Edgett; 688; 9.6% | Sharon R. Greenlaw; 291; 4.1% | | **Andrea Anderson-Mason** |
| Saint Croix | Kathy Bockus; 3570; 45.2% | John Wayne Gardner; 401; 5.1% | Kim Reeder; 1238; 15.7% | Rod Cumberland; 2546; 32.2% | Brad McKinney; 147; 1.9% | | Vacant |

=== Capital Region ===
| Electoral district | Candidates | | | | | | Incumbent |
| Electoral district | Progressive Conservatives | Liberal | Green | PANB | NDP | Other | Incumbent |
|---|---|---|---|---|---|---|---|
| Oromocto-Lincoln-Fredericton | **Mary E. Wilson**; 3374; 44.3% | Steven Burns; 2072; 27.2% | Gail Costello; 1306; 17.1% | Craig Rector; 745; 9.8% | Natasha M. Akhtar; 127; 1.7% | | **Mary E. Wilson** |
| Fredericton-Grand Lake | Roy Wiggins; 2479; 30.6% | Eldon Hunter; 749; 9.3% | Ken Washburn; 1005; 12.4% | **Kris Austin**; 3759; 46.4% | Greg Cook; 87; 1.1% | Grenville Woollacott (KISS); 18; 0.2% | **Kris Austin** |
| New Maryland-Sunbury | Jeff Carr; 5342; 57.8% | Chris Pelkey; 1048; 11.3% | Jen Smith; 1463; 15.8% | Morris Shannon; 1254; 13.6% | Chris Thompson; 141; 1.5% | | **Jeff Carr** |
| Fredericton South | Brian MacKinnon; 2342; 30.0% | Nicole Picot; 895; 11.5% | **David Coon**; 4213; 54.0% | Wendell Betts; 234; 3.0% | Geoffrey Noseworthy; 117; 1.5% | | **David Coon** |
| Fredericton North | Jill Green; 3227; 41.1% | Stephen Horsman; 1464; 18.7% | Luke Randall; 2464; 31.4% | Allen Price; 591; 7.5% | **Mackenzie Thomason**; 100; 1.3% | | Stephen Horsman |
| Fredericton-York | Ryan Cullins; 3730; 42.4% | Randy McKeen; 872; 9.9% | Melissa Fraser; 2110; 24.0% | Rick DeSaulniers; 1991; 22.6% | Steven J. LaForest; 68; 0.8% | **Gerald Bourque** (KISS); 24; 0.3% | Rick DeSaulniers |
| Fredericton West-Hanwell | **Dominic Cardy**; 4726; 52.9% | Chris Duffie; 1510; 16.9% | Susan Jonah; 1745; 19.5% | Mel Keeling; 825; 9.2% | Armand Cormier; 131; 1.5% | | **Dominic Cardy** |
| Carleton-York | Richard Ames; 4750; 57.8% | Robert Kitchen; 940; 11.4% | Louise Comeau; 890; 10.8% | Gary Lemmon; 1524; 18.6% | Jarrett Oldenburg; 110; 1.3% | | **Carl Urquhart**† |

=== Upper River Valley ===
| Electoral district | Candidates | | | | | | Incumbent |
| Electoral district | Progressive Conservatives | Liberal | Green | PANB | NDP | Other | Incumbent |
|---|---|---|---|---|---|---|---|
| Carleton | Bill Hogan; 3536; 47.9% | Theresa Blackburn; 1239; 16.8% | Greg Crouse; 581; 7.9% | Graham Gill; 1909; 25.8% | Shawn Oldenburg; 80; 1.1% | Andy Walton (KISS); 41; 0.6% | Stewart Fairgrieve† |
| Carleton-Victoria | Margaret Johnson; 3330; 45.2% | Andrew Harvey; 2939; 39.9% | Rowan Patrick Miller; 372; 5.1% | Terry Leigh Sisson; 610; 8.3% | Meriet Gray Miller; 113; 1.5% | | Andrew Harvey |
| Victoria-La Vallée | Roland Michaud; 2071; 28.6% | Chuck Chiasson; 4365; 60.2% | Nathanaël Denis Lavoie; 426; 5.9% | André Jobin; 292; 4.0% | | Danny Zolondek (Ind.); 92; 1.3% | Chuck Chiasson |
| Edmundston-Madawaska Centre | Joanne Bérubé Gagné; 1380; 19.6% | Jean-Claude (JC) D'Amours; 5236; 74.5% | Marco Morency; 415; 5.9% | | | | Jean-Claude (JC) D'Amours |
| Madawaska Les Lacs-Edmundston | Marie-Eve Castonguay; 1763; 25.6% | Francine Landry; 4583; 66.5% | Marie-Soleil Lussier; 542; 7.9% | | | | Francine Landry |
