= Carleton-Victoria =

Provincial electoral district in New Brunswick, Canada

New Brunswick electoral district
- The riding of Carleton-Victoria (as it exists from 2023) in relation to other New Brunswick electoral districts
- Coordinates: 46.795°N 67.294°W

Provincial electoral district
- Legislature: Legislative Assembly of New Brunswick
MLA
Margaret Johnson
Progressive Conservative
- District created: 2013
- First contested: 2014
- Last contested: 2024

Demographics
- Census division(s): Carleton, Victoria

Carleton-Victoria is a provincial electoral district for the Legislative Assembly of New Brunswick, Canada. It was first contested in the 2014 general election, having been created in the 2013 redistribution of electoral boundaries by combining portions of the Carleton and Victoria-Tobique electoral districts.

The district includes the northern parts of Carleton County and the southern and eastern parts of Victoria County.

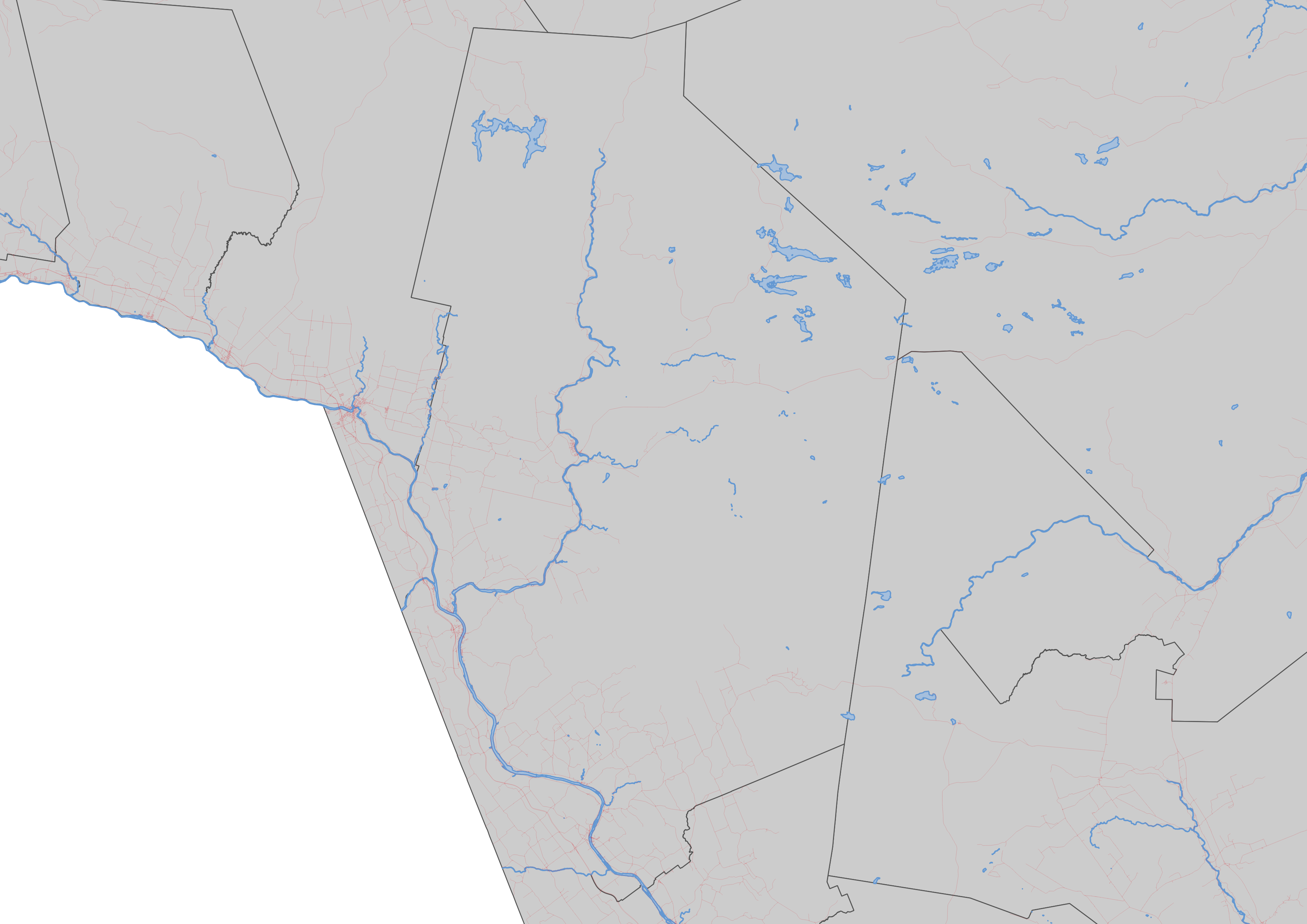
Carleton-Victoria (as it exists from 2023) and the roads in the riding

== Members of the Legislative Assembly ==
Assembly	Years	Member	Party
Riding created from Victoria-Tobique and Carleton (1995–2014)
58th	2014–2018	Andrew Harvey	Liberal
59th	2018–2020	Andrew Harvey	Liberal
60th	2020–2024	Margaret Johnson	Progressive Conservative
61st	2024–Present	Margaret Johnson	Progressive Conservative

== Election results ==
2024 New Brunswick general election
Party	Candidate	Votes	%	±%
Progressive Conservative	Margaret Johnson	4,798		
Liberal	Julian Moulton	2,159		
Green	Rebecca Blaevoet	451		
Social Justice	Tasha Rossignol	290		
Total valid votes				
Total rejected ballots				
Turnout				
Eligible voters				
Source: Elections New Brunswick

2020 provincial election redistributed results
Party	%
Progressive Conservative	45.0
Liberal	38.0
People's Alliance	9.8
Green	5.6
New Democratic	1.4

2020 New Brunswick general election
Party	Candidate	Votes	%	±%
Progressive Conservative	Margaret C. Johnson	3,330	45.22	+7.54
Liberal	Andrew Harvey	2,939	39.91	-0.97
People's Alliance	Terry Leigh Sisson	610	8.28	-4.31
Green	Rowan Patrick Miller	372	5.05	-1.55
New Democratic	Meriet Gray Miller	113	1.53	+0.04
Total valid votes		7,364	99.72	
Total rejected ballots		21	0.28	+0.18
Turnout		7,385	63.48	-2.12
Eligible voters		11,633		
Progressive Conservative gain from Liberal		Swing		+4.26
Source: Elections New Brunswick

2018 New Brunswick general election
Party	Candidate	Votes	%	±%
Liberal	Andrew Harvey	3,116	40.88	+0.04
Progressive Conservative	Margaret C. Johnson	2,872	37.68	-2.09
People's Alliance	Terry Leigh Sisson	960	12.59	--
Green	Paula Shaw	503	6.60	+0.55
New Democratic	Margaret Geldart	114	1.50	-7.41
KISS	Carter Edgar	58	0.76	-2.06*
Total valid votes		7,623	99.90	
Total rejected ballots		8	0.10	-0.23
Turnout		7,631	65.60	+1.46
Eligible voters		11,632		
Liberal hold		Swing		+1.07
*Carter Edgar's vote share change compared to his run as an independent candidate in 2014.
Source: Elections New Brunswick

2014 New Brunswick general election
Party	Candidate	Votes	%
Liberal	Andrew Harvey	3,131	40.83
Progressive Conservative	Colin Lockhart	3,049	39.76
New Democratic	Joe Gee	683	8.91
Green	Garth Farquhar	464	6.05
Independent	Carter Edgar	216	2.82
Independent	Terrence "Terry" Ritchie	125	1.63
Total valid votes		7,668	99.66
Total rejected ballots		26	0.34
Turnout		7,694	64.14
Eligible voters		11,995	
Voting results declared after judicial recount.
This riding was created from parts of Victoria-Tobique and the former riding of Carleton, which both elected Progressive Conservatives in the previous election. Neither of the incumbents ran in this election.
Source: Elections New Brunswick

== See also ==
- List of New Brunswick provincial electoral districts
- Canadian provincial electoral districts
