= Rick DeSaulniers =

Canadian politician

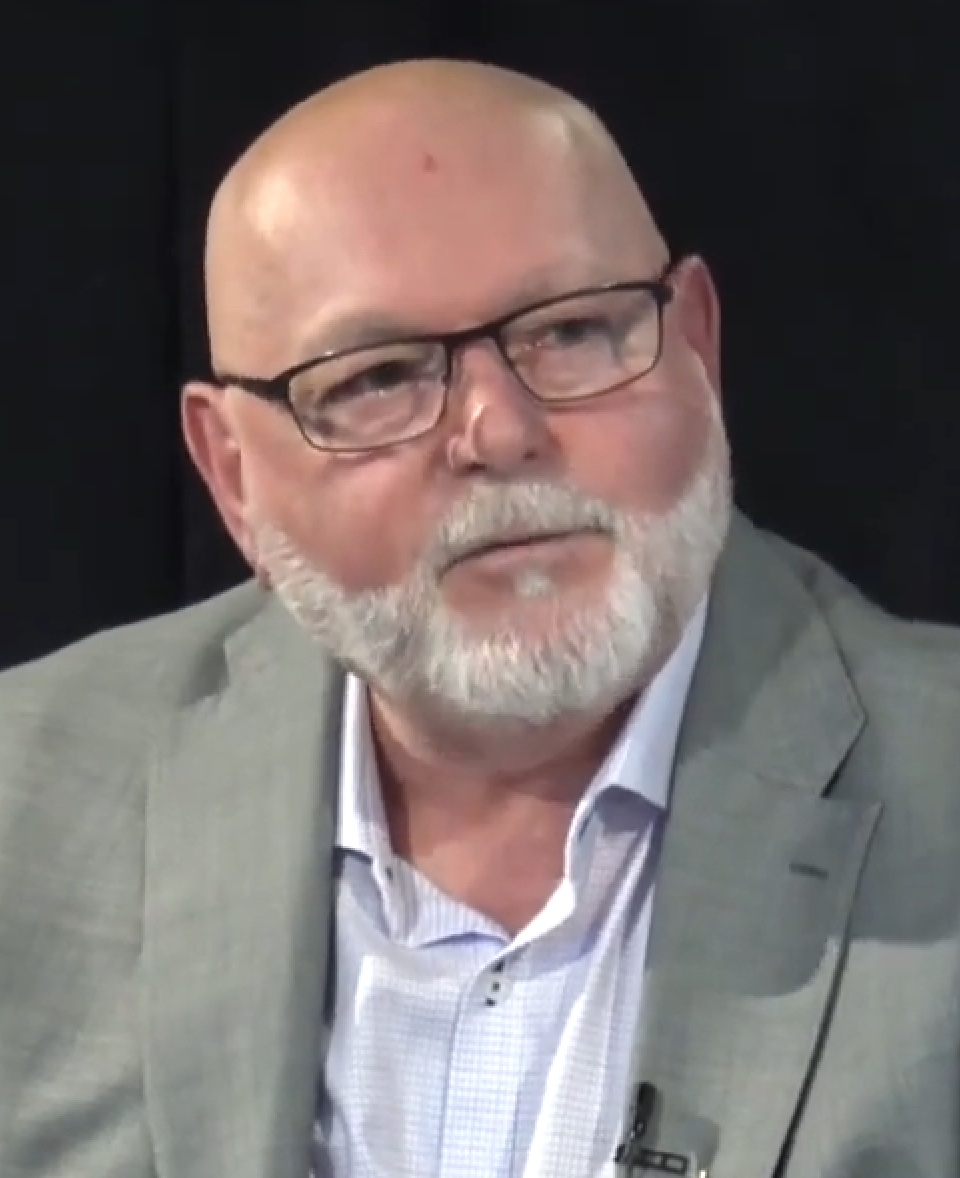

Leader of the People's Alliance of New Brunswick
- In office April 22, 2022 – June 30, 2025
- Preceded by: Kris Austin

Member of the Legislative Assembly of New Brunswick for Fredericton-York
- In office September 24, 2018 – August 17, 2020
- Preceded by: Kirk MacDonald
- Succeeded by: Ryan Cullins

Personal details
- Born: Rick DeSaulniers
- Party: People's Alliance of New Brunswick

Rick DeSaulniers is a Canadian politician who served as the leader of the People's Alliance of New Brunswick from 2022 to 2025. In the 2018 election, he was elected as the MLA for the electoral district of Fredericton-York. He lost his seat in the 2020 general election.

DeSaulniers was named interim leader of the People's Alliance in April 2022 after party leader Kris Austin and Michelle Conroy crossed the floor to the Progressive Conservatives on March 30, 2022.

On May 28, 2022, DeSaulniers was acclaimed as the new leader of the People's Alliance. In the 2024 election, he ran against former party leader Kris Austin in Fredericton-Grand Lake and placed fourth with 5.6%.

On June 30, 2025, the People's Alliance deregistered as a party, ending his tenure as leader.

== Election results ==
2024 New Brunswick general election: Fredericton-Grand Lake
Party	Candidate	Votes	%	±%
Progressive Conservative	Kris Austin	4,456	54.0%	+22.7
Liberal	Kevin Dignam	2,277	27.6%	+18.4
Green	Ken Washburn	862	10.4%	-3.0
People's Alliance	Rick DeSaulniers	461	5.6%	-39.2
New Democratic	Arthur Taylor	195	2.4%	+1.4
Total valid votes		8,251		
Total rejected ballots				
Turnout				
Eligible voters				
Source: Elections New Brunswick

2020 New Brunswick general election
Party	Candidate	Votes	%	±%
Progressive Conservative	Ryan Cullins	3,730	42.41	+11.53
Green	Melissa Fraser	2,110	23.99	+8.50
People's Alliance	Rick DeSaulniers	1,991	22.64	-11.09
Liberal	Randy McKeen	872	9.91	-8.46
New Democratic	Steven J. LaForest	68	0.77	-0.38
KISS	Gerald Bourque	24	0.27	-0.11
Total valid votes		8,795	100.0	
Total rejected ballots		36	0.41	
Turnout		8,831	70.41	
Eligible voters		12,542		
Progressive Conservative gain from People's Alliance		Swing		+1.52

2018 New Brunswick general election
Party	Candidate	Votes	%	±%
People's Alliance	Rick DeSaulniers	3,033	33.7	
Progressive Conservative	Kirk MacDonald	2,777	30.9	
Liberal	Amber Bishop	1,652	18.4	
Green	Amanda Wildeman	1,393	15.5	
New Democratic	Evelyne Godfrey	103	1.1	
KISS	Sandra Bourque	34	0.3	
Total valid votes		8,992	100.0	
Total rejected ballots		18		
Turnout		9,010	72.40%	
Eligible voters		12,444		
