= Brian Kenny (politician) =

Canadian politician

Brian Kenny MLA
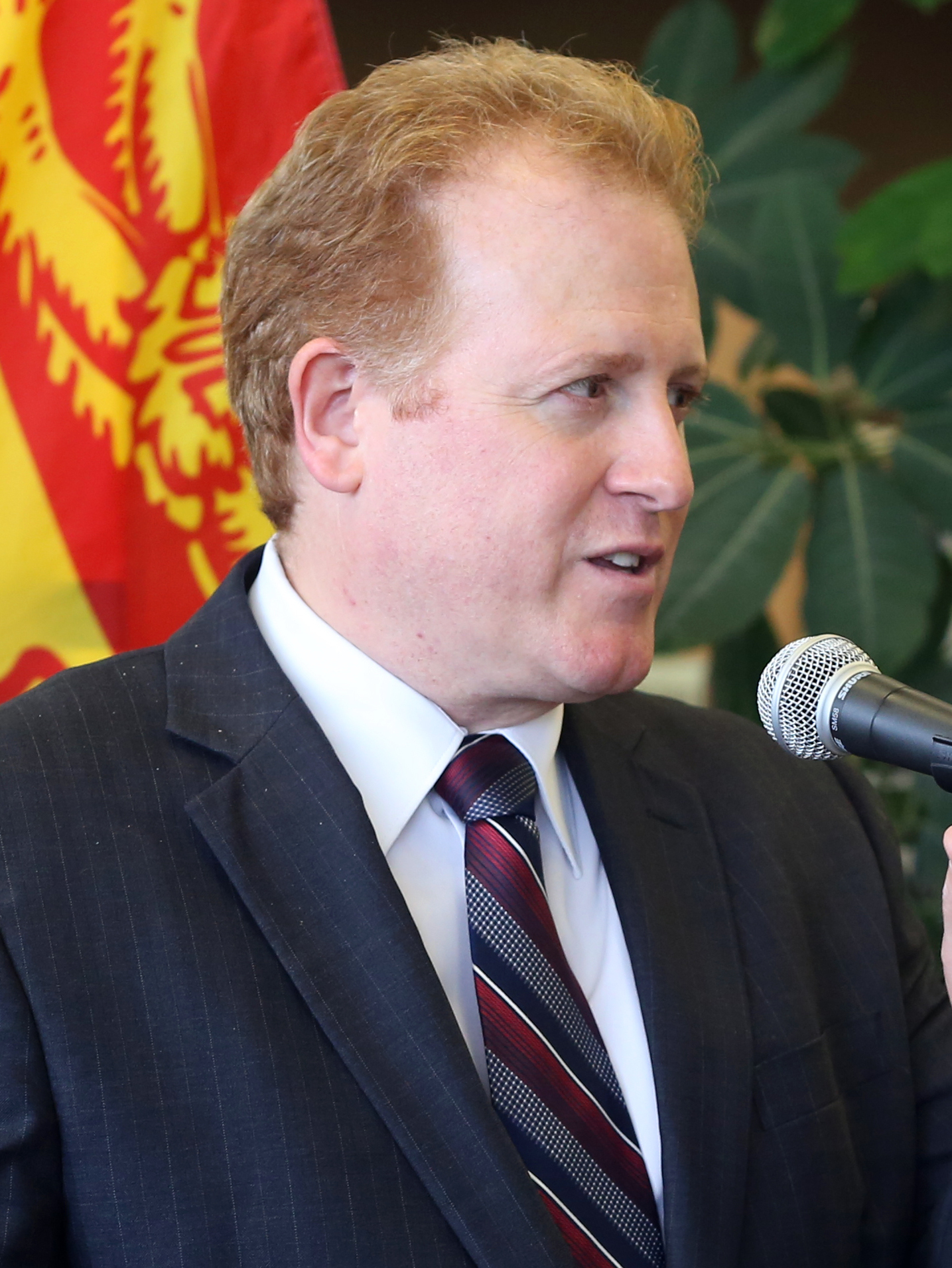
- Kenny in 2017

Minister of Education and Early Childhood Development
- In office June 6, 2016 – November 9, 2018
- Premier: Brian Gallant
- Preceded by: Serge Rousselle
- Succeeded by: Dominic Cardy

Minister of Environment and Local Government
- In office October 7, 2014 – June 6, 2016
- Premier: Brian Gallant
- Preceded by: Danny Soucy
- Succeeded by: Serge Rousselle

Member of the New Brunswick Legislative Assembly for Bathurst West-Beresford
- In office September 22, 2014 – August 17, 2020
- Preceded by: new riding
- Succeeded by: René Legacy

Member of the New Brunswick Legislative Assembly for Bathurst
- In office June 9, 2003 – September 22, 2014
- Preceded by: Marcelle Mersereau
- Succeeded by: riding redistributed

Personal details
- Born: Bathurst, New Brunswick
- Party: Liberal

Brian Andrew Kenny is a politician in the province of New Brunswick, Canada. He was elected to the Legislative Assembly of New Brunswick in the 2003 election and re-elected in 2006.

Kenny was born in Bathurst, New Brunswick, the son of David Kenny. He is a licensed real estate broker. He married Wendy McParland. He represented the electoral district of Bathurst as a member of the Liberal Party.

Kenny was first elected to the Legislative Assembly of New Brunswick in the 2003 provincial election. He is a member of the Standing Committee on Ombudsman and, as a member of the official opposition, he was the critic for interests relating to the Regional Development Corporation and was also a critic for mines.

He was re-elected to the 56th Legislature in the provincial election held September 18, 2006. On February 6, 2007, he was appointed Deputy Speaker of the New Brunswick Legislature. He is the Vice Chair of the Standing Committee on Public Accounts, Member of the Select Committee on Wellness, Member of the Standing Committee on Crown Corporations, Standing Committee on Estimates, Standing Committee on Procedure, Standing Committee on Privileges and the Legislative Administration Committee.

On November 12, 2008, he was named to the cabinet as Minister of State for Seniors and Minister responsible for Community Non-profit Organizations.

Kenny was appointed Minister of Tourism and Parks May 10, 2010. He retired from politics at the 2020 election.

New Brunswick provincial government of Shawn Graham
Special Cabinet Responsibilities
| Predecessor | Title | Successor |
| Hédard Albert (acting) | Minister of Tourism and Parks; 2010 | Trevor Holder |
| Eugene McGinley | Minister of State for Seniors; 2008–2010 | Cheryl Lavoie |
| Carmel Robichaud | Minister responsible for community non-profit organizations 2008–2010 | Cheryl Lavoie |
