= Bathurst West-Beresford =

Provincial electoral district in New Brunswick, Canada

New Brunswick electoral district
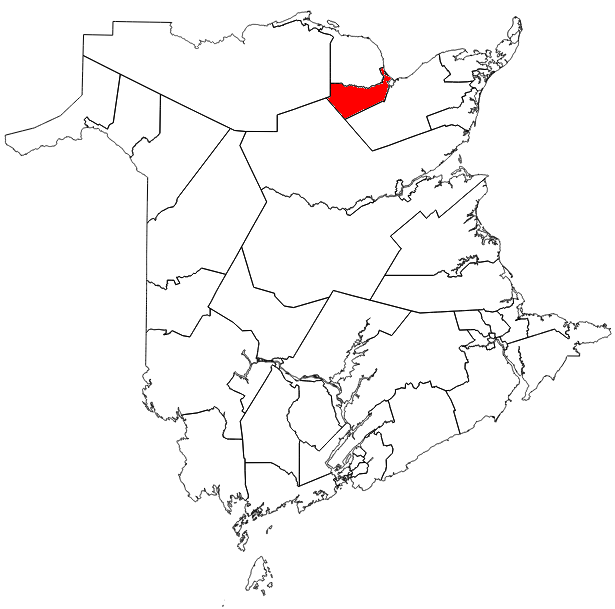
- The riding of Bathurst West-Beresford in relation to other New Brunswick electoral districts.
- Coordinates: 47.569°N 65.916°W

Defunct provincial electoral district
- Legislature: Legislative Assembly of New Brunswick
- District created: 2013
- District abolished: 2023
- First contested: 2014
- Last contested: 2020

Demographics
- Population (2011): 14,273
- Electors (2013): 11,256
- Census division(s): Gloucester
- Census subdivision(s): Bathurst, Beresford

Bathurst West-Beresford (French: Bathurst-Ouest-Beresford) was a provincial electoral district for the Legislative Assembly of New Brunswick, Canada. It was contested in the 2014 general election, having been created in the 2013 redistribution of electoral boundaries from portions of the Bathurst and Nigadoo-Chaleur electoral districts.

It included the city of Bathurst west of the Middle River, the town of Beresford and rural communities south of the Tetagouche River.

== Members of the Legislative Assembly ==
Assembly	Years	Member	Party
Riding created from Bathurst, Nigadoo-Chaleur and Nepisiguit
58th	2014–2018	Brian Kenny	Liberal
59th	2018–2020	Brian Kenny	Liberal
60th	2020–2024	René Legacy	Liberal
Riding dissolved into Bathurst and Belle-Baie-Belledune

== Election results ==
2020 New Brunswick general election
Party	Candidate	Votes	%	±%
Liberal	René Legacy	3,730	55.84	-11.69
Progressive Conservative	Anne Bard-Lavigne	1,985	29.72	+12.92
Green	Pierre Duguay-Boudreau	965	14.45	+6.64
Total valid votes		6,680	100.00	
Total rejected ballots		28	0.42	-0.23
Turnout		6,708	61.74	+2.60
Eligible voters		10,865		
Liberal hold		Swing		-12.31
Source: Elections New Brunswick

2018 New Brunswick general election
Party	Candidate	Votes	%	±%
Liberal	Brian Kenny	4,351	67.53	+4.80
Progressive Conservative	Yvon Landry	1,082	16.79	-8.75
Green	Mike Rau	503	7.81	+4.19
New Democratic	Anne-Renée Thomas	443	6.88	-1.23
KISS	James Risdon	64	0.99	--
Total valid votes		6,443	99.35	
Total rejected ballots		42	0.65	+0.32
Turnout		6,485	59.14	-3.66
Eligible voters		10,966		
Liberal hold		Swing		+6.77

2014 New Brunswick general election
Party	Candidate	Votes	%
Liberal	Brian Kenny	4,367	62.74
Progressive Conservative	Anne Bard-Lavigne	1,778	25.54
New Democratic	Etienne Arseneau	564	8.10
Green	Catherine Doucet	252	3.62
Total valid votes		6,961	99.67
Total rejected ballots		23	0.33
Turnout		6,984	62.79
Eligible voters		11,122	
This riding was created from parts of Bathurst, Nigadoo-Chaleur and Nepisiguit, they elected two Liberals and one Progressive Conservative (Nepisiguit) in the previous election. Brian Kenny was the incumbent from Bathurst.
Source: Elections New Brunswick
