= List of snap elections in Canada =

The following is a list of elections in Canada, both federal and provincial, that have been regarded by all or some observers as snap elections:

- 1865 New Brunswick general election
  - Issue: Canadian Confederation
  - Result: Pro-Confederates under Premier Samuel Leonard Tilley are defeated, but later return to power after the new anti-Confederation government is forced from office.
- 1911 Canadian federal election
  - Issues: Reciprocity with the United States; the Naval Bill
  - Result: Prime Minister Wilfrid Laurier's Liberals are defeated.
- 1917 Canadian federal election
  - Issue: Conscription Crisis of 1917. (The election was supposed to be held in 1916, but due to the emergency of the First World War, the government postponed the election, largely in hope that a coalition government could be formed, as was the case in the United Kingdom.)
  - Result: Prime Minister Robert Borden's Unionists, an alliance of pro-conscription politicians, increase their majority. The vote in Canada is heavily divided along anglophone and francophone lines.
- 1958 Canadian federal election
  - Reason: Newly elected Liberal leader Lester Pearson made a speech demanding that the Progressive Conservatives hand back power without an election because of the recent economic decline. Diefenbaker responded by revealing a formerly classified Liberal file that predicted the economic malaise, so the "arrogant" label that had attached to Liberals in 1957 stayed. Also, the resignation of Louis St. Laurent had also left Quebec with no favourite son leader and the Progressive Conservatives were also able to harness the powerful political machine of the provincial Union Nationale, despite Diefenbaker's poor command of French. The Progressive Conservatives thus hoped to obtain a majority government.
  - Result: Prime Minister John Diefenbaker's Progressive Conservatives win the largest majority up to that time at the federal level.
- 1962 Quebec general election
  - Reason: Obtain a clear mandate to nationalize the electricity industry.
  - Result: Premier Jean Lesage's Liberals win an increased majority.
- 1976 Quebec general election
  - Reason: Counting on a boost from his successful rescue of the 1976 Summer Olympics in Montreal after cost overruns and construction delays by the Montreal municipal government, Liberal Premier Robert Bourassa called an early election well before the five-year maximum term ended.
  - Result: The separatist Parti Québécois, led by René Lévesque, defeated the incumbent Liberals in a landslide to form government for the first time and set the stage for the 1980 Quebec referendum. The once-powerful Union Nationale (Quebec) made a modest comeback, winning 11 seats under Rodrigue Biron, and for the first time won significant support from some anglophone voters. Bourassa lost his seat and resigned as Liberal leader to pursue an academic career, before leading the Liberals back to power in 1985.
- 1982 Alberta general election
  - Reason: Surging support for separatism, marked by a victory for the separatist Western Canada Concept in a by-election held earlier in the year.
  - Result: Premier Peter Lougheed's Tories win a massive majority, with the WCC failing to retain its recently won seat or win any others.
- 1984 Canadian federal election
  - Reason: Newly minted Liberal leader and Prime Minister John Turner was persuaded by internal polls that he was well ahead of the opposition. He also wanted to present a "new" party, different from his predecessor Pierre Trudeau. Turner did not have a seat in the Commons, and his election call was just nine days after being sworn in. However, the Liberals had been elected in 1980 and Turner would constitutionally be allowed to wait until 1985 to call an election.
  - Result: Turner's 200 patronage appointments, mostly on the recommendation of Trudeau, nullified attempts to distance himself from Trudeau's policies and practices. The Liberal's Quebec stronghold was also nullified as Progressive Conservative leader Brian Mulroney was a native of that province. The Progressive Conservatives win the largest majority ever at the federal level, while the Liberals end up with 40 seats, only ten more than the NDP's 30.
- 1989 Alberta general election
  - Reason: Opposition support evenly divided between NDs and Liberals.
  - Result: Premier Donald Getty's Tories win a slightly reduced majority, but Getty loses his own seat and must run in a by-election.
- 1990 Ontario general election
  - Reason: Favourable opinion polls, as the ruling Liberals are still above the 50% mark. Premier David Peterson allegedly wanted to call an election before the full effects of the looming recession could be felt. Some within his party oppose the early election call (they had won a huge majority in 1987).
  - Result: The Liberals are beset by controversies and scandals right after the campaign started, with unions and interest groups expressing their cynicism about the snap election. Bob Rae's NDP managed an electoral upset, slightly outpolling the Liberals in the popular vote but winning enough seats for a majority. Peterson loses his own seat and resigns the party leadership.
- 1997 Canadian federal election
  - Reason: Favourable opinion polls. Some government MPs opposed the snap election, as cleanup from the devastating Red River Flood was still underway. This was also the second shortest majority mandate in Canadian history, after Laurier's 1908–1911 term.
  - Result: Jean Chrétien's Liberals barely retain their majority. The NDP and Progressive Conservatives win enough seats, mainly at the expense of the Liberals in the Atlantic provinces, to regain official party status.
- 2000 Canadian federal election
  - Reason: Prime Minister Jean Chrétien planned to call an election before the newly formed Canadian Alliance could consolidate itself outside of its western Canadian base. The call was also to take advantage of newly elected leader Stockwell Day's lack of experience as a federal politician. (Day also dared Chrétien to call an election.)
  - Result: In a campaign lacking important issues and record low turnout, Chrétien's Liberals were re-elected with an increased majority, taking back seats in Atlantic Canada that they lost to the NDP and Progressive Conservatives in the previous election.
- 2008 Canadian federal election
  - Reason: In 2007, Parliament passed a law fixing federal election dates every four years and scheduling the next election date as October 19, 2009, but the law did not (and could not without a Constitutional Amendment) limit the powers of the governor general to dissolve Parliament at any time, such as when opposition parties bring down the government on a vote of confidence. In this election there was no loss of a non-confidence vote, but the prime minister asked the governor general to call an election. The governor general granted the prime minister's request. Stephen Harper hinted at the possibility of dissolving parliament on August 14, 2008. Speaking in Newfoundland and Labrador, he cited Stéphane Dion as the main player in making Parliament become increasingly "dysfunctional". "I'm going to have to make a judgment in the next little while as to whether or not this Parliament can function productively," Harper said. This came after repeated confidence votes that resulted in the NDP and Bloc parties not voting in favour of the government, and the Liberal Party voting in favour or not attending the vote. Rumours of a possible fall election were further fuelled by Harper's announcement of a fourth federal by-election for September 22 in the Toronto riding of Don Valley West.
  - Result: The election resulted in a second, but stronger minority government for the Conservative Party, led by the incumbent prime minister, Stephen Harper. While the Conservatives were a dozen seats away from a majority government, the Liberal Party led by Stéphane Dion lost 18 seats as the New Democratic Party and the Bloc Québécois made slight gains. The Green Party failed to win any seats and lost its only Member of Parliament. Following the election, a coalition attempt among the Liberal Party and New Democratic Party emerged but was unsuccessful.
- 2008 Quebec general election
  - Reason: In the previous election of 2007, Premier Jean Charest's Liberals were re-elected but only as a minority government. The election was called, claiming the need for a mandate to deal with the 2008 financial crisis.
  - Result: The Quebec Liberal Party was returned with a majority and the Parti Québécois under Pauline Marois came second as support for Mario Dumont's ADQ collapsed.
- 2012 Quebec general election
  - Reason: Faced with student protests and corruption allegations, Liberal Premier Jean Charest called a snap election to seek a fourth consecutive mandate, pitting the Liberals against Pauline Marois's Parti Québécois a second time.
  - Result: Pauline Marois's Parti Québécois is elected to form a minority government, with a massive decline in the Liberals' vote and Premier Charest losing his seat. The Coalition Avenir Québec, in its first electoral test, came in third place but coming close to beating the Liberals' in the popular vote.
- 2014 Quebec general election
  - Reason: Premier Pauline Marois's Parti Québécois sought a majority government having won government in 2012 in minority. Marois called an election due to favourable opinion polls and facing imminent defeat on the 2014-15 provincial budget.
  - Result: The Quebec Liberal Party under Philippe Couillard won a majority government defeating the incumbent Parti Québécois government, becoming the first single-term government since 1970. It marked the lowest seat total for the Parti Québécois since 1989 and its smallest share of the popular vote since 1970, with Pauline Marois losing her own riding. The Coalition Avenir Québec under François Legault made minor gains in terms of seats despite receiving a smaller share of the popular vote than in the 2012 election.
- 2014 Ontario general election
  - Reason: The Ontario New Democrats announced that they would not support the minority Liberal government's budget. Facing certain defeat on the budget in the Legislative Assembly, Premier Kathleen Wynne called an election before the eventual budget vote.
  - Result: The Liberals regained majority government, Progressive Conservative leader Tim Hudak resigned after losing a second election, while the NDP remained in third place.
- 2015 Alberta general election
  - Reason: Premier Jim Prentice called for an election on April 7, 2015, a year earlier than expected, because he "needed a mandate to implement a tough budget" that proposed higher taxes, fees, and cuts in government spending.
  - Result: Rachel Notley, representing the NDP, won a majority government, the first Alberta government in that party's history, ending the Progressive Conservative's 43-year reign in government. The Wildrose Party became the official opposition, while the Progressive Conservatives went down to 10 seats, their worst defeat since the 1967 election. The Wildrose and Progressive Conservative parties would subsequently merge, creating the United Conservative Party.
- 2019 Manitoba general election
  - Reason: Premier Brian Pallister called an election just over a year ahead of schedule, citing a need to seek a new mandate to continue implementing the government's platform for Manitoba. The election was called for September 10, 2019, just one day before the writs were issued for the 2019 Canadian federal election.
  - Result: The Progressive Conservative Party of Manitoba won a second majority government with 36 out 57 seats in the Legislative Assembly of Manitoba and 47.07% of the popular vote.
- 2020 New Brunswick general election
  - Reason: Premier Blaine Higgs called an election for September 14, 2020, saying stability was required for the next phase of the COVID-19 pandemic and economic recovery. At the time, Higgs led a minority government.
  - Result: The Progressive Conservative Party of New Brunswick won a majority government with 27 out 49 seats in the Legislative Assembly of New Brunswick and 39.27% of the popular vote. It also marked the first time a government had been re-elected in New Brunswick since 2003.
- 2020 British Columbia general election
  - Reason: Premier John Horgan had led a minority government under a confidence and supply agreement with the Green Party of British Columbia, due to expire in June 2021. He called an election for October 24, 2020, to avoid creating "uncertainty and instability" in a minority government situation during the COVID-19 pandemic, which he said he expected to last well into the next year.
  - Result: The NDP won a majority government with 57 out of 87 seats and 47.7% of the popular vote.
- 2021 Canadian federal election
  - Reason: Prime Minister Justin Trudeau called an election more than 2 years ahead of schedule, framing the election as a decision on political parties' post-Covid-19 policies. However, most of the media and voters interpreted the election as Trudeau's quest to recapture a Liberal majority government, while capitalizing on strong polling and his government’s record in handling the health and economic crises of the pandemic.
  - Result: The election resulted in a second, but slightly stronger minority government for the Liberal Party, led by the incumbent prime minister, Justin Trudeau. Following the election, the Liberals and NDP formed a confidence and supply agreement in March 2022, which lasted until the NDP withdrew in September 2024.
- 2023 Prince Edward Island general election
  - Reason: Premier Dennis King called an election 6 months ahead of schedule.
  - Result: The Progressive Conservatives are re-elected with a majority government, winning 22 out of 27 seats at 55.92% of the popular vote.
- 2024 Nova Scotia general election
  - Reason: Premier Tim Houston called an election 8 months ahead of schedule.
  - Result: The Progressive Conservatives are re-elected with a larger majority government, winning 43 out of 55 seats at 52.49% of the popular vote.
- 2025 Ontario general election
  - Reason: Premier Doug Ford called an election more than a year ahead of schedule, framing the election as a necessity for the "largest mandate in Ontario history" to fight against United States President Donald Trump's tariffs.
  - Result: The Progressive Conservatives are re-elected with a third majority government, winning 80 out of 124 seats at 42.97% of the popular vote. While this was only one seat larger than what the party previously had, it was the first time since 1959 that an Ontario Premier had won three consecutive majorities.
- 2025 Canadian federal election
  - Reason: Newly minted Liberal leader and Prime Minister Mark Carney called an election less than 6 months ahead of schedule, framing the election as a necessity for the "largest mandate in Canadian history" to fight against United States President Donald Trump's tariffs.
  - Result: The election resulted in a third, but stronger minority government for the Liberal Party, led by the new incumbent prime minister, Mark Carney.
- 2026 British Columbia general election
  - Reason: Premier David Eby called an election 2 years ahead of schedule on September 22, 2026, framing the election to secure a stable majority against Trump's tariff threats. This also overlapped with the municipal elections scheduled a week before.
  - Result: The Conservatives under interim leader Lorne Doerkson won a majority government defeating the incumbent NDP government, forming for the first time since 1928.
