= Fredericton-York =

Provincial electoral district in New Brunswick, Canada

New Brunswick electoral district
- The riding of Fredericton-York (as it exists from 2023) in relation to other New Brunswick electoral districts
- Coordinates: 46.109°N 66.740°W

Provincial electoral district
- Legislature: Legislative Assembly of New Brunswick
MLA
Ryan Cullins
Progressive Conservative
- District created: 2013
- First contested: 2014
- Last contested: 2024

Demographics
- Population (2011): 15,552
- Electors (2013): 11,124
- Census division: York
- Census subdivision(s): Douglas, Fredericton, Nashwaak

Fredericton-York is a provincial electoral district for the Legislative Assembly of New Brunswick, Canada. It was first contested in the 2014 general election, having been created in the 2013 redistribution of electoral boundaries from portions of the former districts of Fredericton-Nashwaaksis and York North.

The district includes a band of the city of Fredericton along its northern and north-westernmost edges as well as surrounding parts of York County, including Douglas, Nashwaak and the Nashwaak River Valley. It was initially to be named Fredericton-Stanley but its name was revised to Fredericton-York in the commission's amended final report.

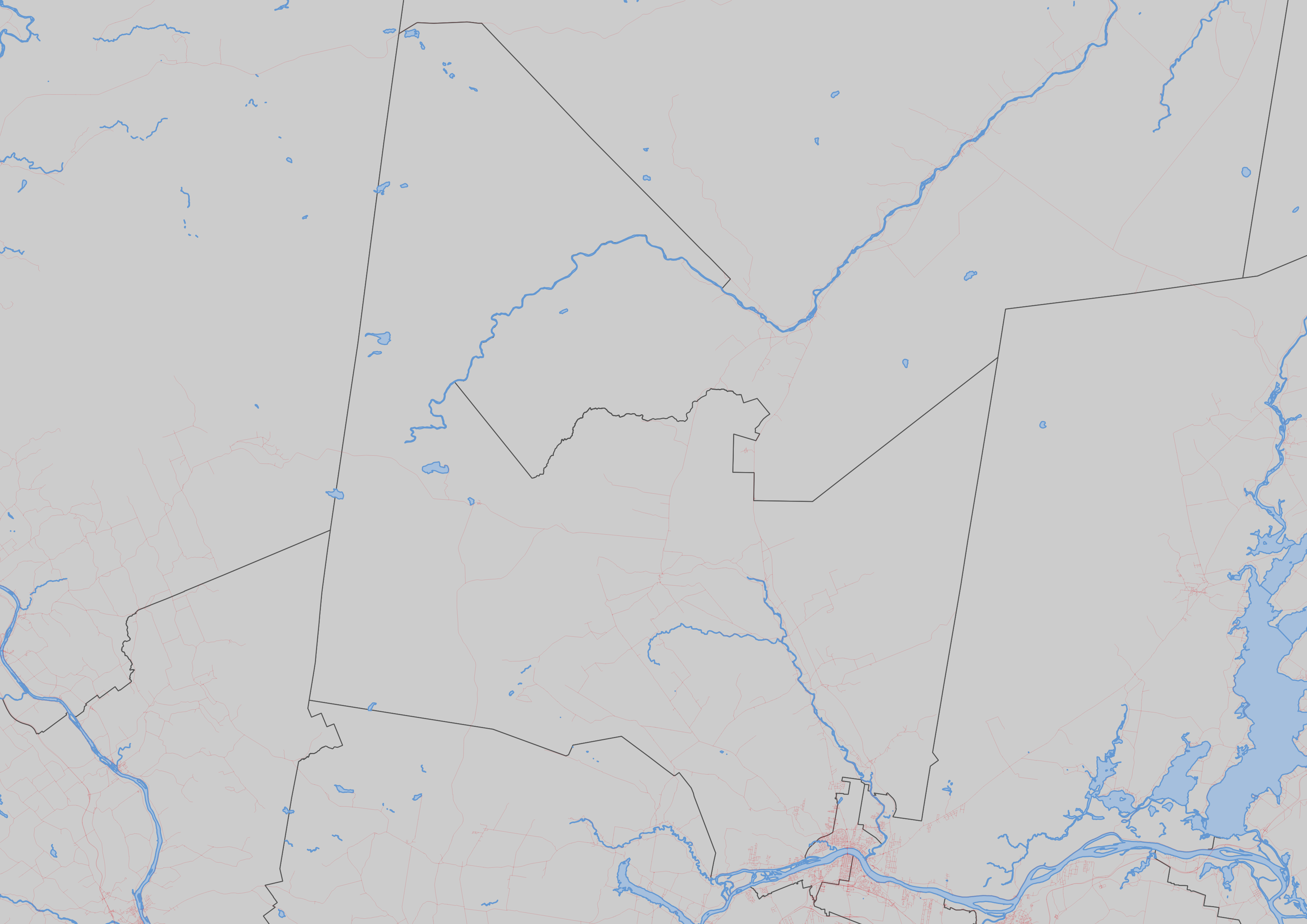
Fredericton-York (as it exists from 2023) and the roads in the riding

== Members of the Legislative Assembly ==
Assembly	Years	Member	Party
Riding created from York North, Fredericton-Nashwaaksis and Fredericton-Fort Nashwaak
58th	2014–2018	Kirk MacDonald	Progressive Conservative
59th	2018–2020	Rick DeSaulniers	People's Alliance
60th	2020–2024	Ryan Cullins	Progressive Conservative
61st	2024–Present	Ryan Cullins	Progressive Conservative

== Election results ==
2024 New Brunswick general election
Party	Candidate	Votes	%	±%
Progressive Conservative	Ryan Cullins	3,572	43.77	+1.7
Liberal	Tanya Whitney	2,527	30.96	+20.9
Green	Pam Allen-LeBlanc	1,673	20.50	-3.4
People's Alliance	Michael Broderick	256	3.14	-19.7
New Democratic	Steven J. LaForest	133	1.63	+0.8
Total valid votes		8,161	99.83	
Total rejected ballots		14	0.17	
Turnout		8,175	-	
Eligible voters		-		
Progressive Conservative hold		Swing		-9.6
Source: Elections New Brunswick

2020 provincial election redistributed results
Party	%
Progressive Conservative	42.1
Green	23.9
People's Alliance	22.8
Liberal	10.1
New Democratic	0.8

2020 New Brunswick general election
Party	Candidate	Votes	%	±%
Progressive Conservative	Ryan Cullins	3,730	42.41	+11.53
Green	Melissa Fraser	2,110	23.99	+8.50
People's Alliance	Rick DeSaulniers	1,991	22.64	-11.09
Liberal	Randy McKeen	872	9.91	-8.46
New Democratic	Steven J. LaForest	68	0.77	-0.38
KISS	Gerard Bourque	24	0.27	-0.11
Total valid votes		8,795	99.59	
Total rejected ballots		36	0.41	
Turnout		8,831	70.41	
Eligible voters		12,542		
Progressive Conservative gain from People's Alliance		Swing		+1.52
Source: Elections New Brunswick

2018 New Brunswick general election
Party	Candidate	Votes	%	±%
People's Alliance	Rick DeSaulniers	3,033	33.73	+29.08
Progressive Conservative	Kirk MacDonald	2,777	30.88	-4.54
Liberal	Amber Bishop	1,652	18.37	-10.65
Green	Amanda Wildeman	1,393	15.49	+8.34
New Democratic	Evelyne Godfrey	103	1.15	-19.65
KISS	Sandra Bourque	34	0.38	--
Total valid votes		8,992	99.80	
Total rejected ballots		18	0.20	-0.08
Turnout		9,010	71.00	+4.29
Eligible voters		12,690		
People's Alliance gain from Progressive Conservative		Swing		+16.81
Source: Elections New Brunswick

2014 New Brunswick general election
Party	Candidate	Votes	%
Progressive Conservative	Kirk Douglas MacDonald	2,887	35.43
Liberal	Randy McKeen	2,365	29.02
New Democratic	Sharon Scott-Levesque	1,695	20.80
Green	Dorothy Diamond	583	7.15
People's Alliance	Rick Wilkins	379	4.65
Independent	Gerald Bourque	240	2.95
Total valid votes		8,149	99.72
Total rejected ballots		23	0.28
Turnout		8,172	66.71
Eligible voters		12,250	
This riding was created from parts of York North, Fredericton-Nashwaaksis and Fredericton-Fort Nashwaak, all three elected a Progressive Conservative in the previous election. Kirk MacDonald was the incumbent from York North.
Source: Elections New Brunswick

== See also ==
- List of New Brunswick provincial electoral districts
- Canadian provincial electoral districts
