= Paul Kenny (politician) =

Canadian politician

Member of the Legislative Assembly of New Brunswick
- In office 1978–1991
- Preceded by: Eugene McGinley
- Succeeded by: Marcelle Mersereau
- Constituency: Bathurst

Personal details
- Born: April 11, 1932 Bathurst, New Brunswick
- Died: December 1, 2013 (aged 81) Bathurst, New Brunswick
- Party: New Brunswick Liberal Association
- Spouse: Mathilda Stever
- Children: 3
- Occupation: businessman

Paul James Kenny (April 11, 1932 – December 1, 2013) was a Canadian politician. He served in the Legislative Assembly of New Brunswick from 1978 to 1991 as a Liberal member from the constituency of Bathurst. He died of cancer in 2013.
