= Eugene McGinley =

Canadian politician

Speaker of the Legislative Assembly of New Brunswick
- In office February 6, 2007 – November 26, 2007
- Preceded by: Michael Malley
- Succeeded by: Roy Boudreau

Member of the New Brunswick Legislative Assembly for Grand Lake-Gagetown Grand Lake (2003-2006)
- In office June 9, 2003 – September 27, 2010
- Preceded by: David Jordan
- Succeeded by: Ross Wetmore

Member of the New Brunswick Legislative Assembly for Bathurst
- In office December 11, 1972 – October 23, 1978
- Preceded by: H. H. Williamson
- Succeeded by: Paul Kenny

Personal details
- Born: July 31, 1935 Chipman, New Brunswick
- Died: July 16, 2019 (aged 83)
- Party: Liberal
- Occupation: Lawyer

Eugene Gregory Bernard McGinley (July 31, 1935 – July 16, 2019) was a politician in the province of New Brunswick, Canada. He was elected to the Legislative Assembly of New Brunswick in a 1972 by-election to represent the electoral district of Bathurst and was re-elected in 1974 following which he retired from politics. He was re-elected in 2003 to represent the district of Grand Lake.

On February 6, 2007 he was elected speaker of the legislature defeating Tony Huntjens and Wally Stiles on the first ballot. He resigned the speakership on October 31, 2007 to accept an appointment to the cabinet as Minister of State for Seniors and Housing. He was left out of cabinet following a November 2008 cabinet shuffle. McGinley did not reoffer in the 2010 election.

McGinley was educated at the University of New Brunswick and in Texas. He went on to practice law in Bathurst. McGinley was named Queen's Counsel in 1985.

New Brunswick provincial government of Shawn Graham
Special Cabinet Responsibilities
Predecessor	Title	Successor
Mary Schryer	Minister of State for Seniors and Housing; 2007–2008; Succeeded by Schryer as Minister responsible for Housing and Kenny as Minister of State for Seniors	Mary Schryer and Brian Kenny
