= René Legacy =

Canadian politician

The Honourable René Legacy MLA

Deputy Premier of New Brunswick
- Incumbent
- Assumed office November 2, 2024
- Premier: Susan Holt

Minister of Finance and Treasury Board
- Incumbent
- Assumed office November 2, 2024
- Premier: Susan Holt
- Preceded by: Ernie Steeves

Member of the New Brunswick Legislative Assembly for Bathurst West-Beresford
- Incumbent
- Assumed office September 14, 2020
- Preceded by: Brian Kenny

Personal details
- Party: Liberal

René Legacy MLA is a Canadian politician who has served as the deputy premier of New Brunswick since November 2024. He has also represented Bathurst West-Beresford in the Legislative Assembly of New Brunswick since 2020.

== Political career ==
Legacy was selected to succeed Brian Kenny as the Liberal candidate in Bathurst West-Beresford. He was elected in the 2020 general election.

Legacy was re-elected in the 2024 general election in the riding of Bathurst. On November 1, 2024, it was announced that he was placed on the cabinet as Deputy Premier, Minister of Finance and Treasury Board, Minister responsible for Energy, and Minister responsible for the Right to Information and Protection of Privacy Act. The government's 2026 budget recorded a $1.3 billion deficit, the largest in provincial history.

== Electoral record ==
2024 New Brunswick general election: Bathurst
Party	Candidate	Votes	%	±%
Liberal	René Legacy	3357	56.58	+2.18
Progressive Conservative	Kim Chamberlain	2029	34.26	−0.4
Green	Robert Kryszko	325	5.49	−8.4
New Democratic	Jeff Frenette	212	3.58	+3.58
Total valid votes				
Total rejected ballots				
Turnout		5293		
Eligible voters				
Liberal hold		Swing		+2.18
