= Bathurst (electoral district) =

Provincial electoral district in New Brunswick, Canada

New Brunswick electoral district
- The riding of Bathurst (as it exists from 2023) in relation to other New Brunswick electoral districts

Provincial electoral district
- Legislature: Legislative Assembly of New Brunswick
MLA
René Legacy
Liberal
- District created: 2023
- First contested: 2024

Bathurst is a provincial electoral district for the Legislative Assembly of New Brunswick, Canada. It was in use from 1967 to 2014, and again since 2024.

== History and geography ==
It was created in the 1967 redistribution when cities were separated from their counties and made independent districts. It was not changed in either the 1973 or 1994 redistributions but in 2006 it lost some territory to the neighbouring riding of Nepisiguit. It was abolished in the 2013 redistribution. In its final form, it consisted of the city of Bathurst except for the part south of Route 11 and east of the Nepisiguit River. It was bordered on the northeast by the riding of Nigadoo-Chaleur, on north by Chaleur Bay, and elsewhere by the riding of Nepisiguit.

The riding was a traditional Liberal seat in the province for most of its existence.

Following the 2023 redistribution, the riding was re-created out of parts of Bathurst West-Beresford, Bathurst East-Nepisiguit-Saint-Isidore, and Restigouche-Chaleur.

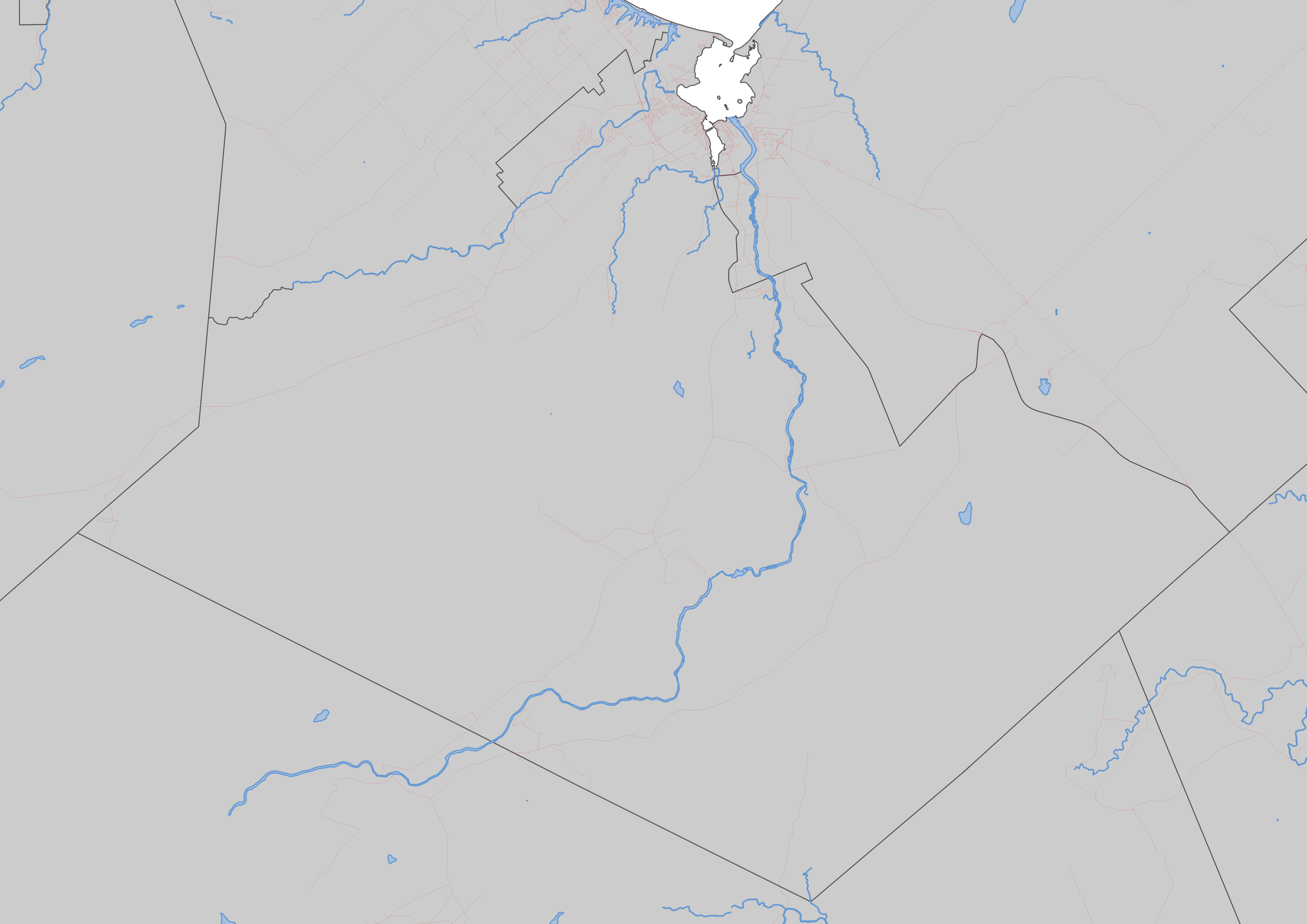
Bathurst (as it exists from 2023) and the roads in the riding

=== Members of the Legislative Assembly ===
Bathurst (1967-2010)
New Brunswick electoral district
- Bathurst in relation to other New Brunswick Provincial electoral districts
- Coordinates: 47.621°N 65.651°W

Defunct provincial electoral district
- Legislature: Legislative Assembly of New Brunswick
- District created: 1967
- First contested: 1967
- Last contested: 2010

Demographics
- Population (2006): 12,527
- Electors (September 27, 2010): 9,344
- Census division(s): Gloucester
- Census subdivision(s): Bathurst

This riding has elected the following members of the Legislative Assembly:

Assembly	Years	Member	Party
Riding created from Gloucester
46th	1967–1970	Harry H. Williamson	Liberal
47th	1970–1972†	Harry H. Williamson	Liberal
47th	1972–1974	Eugene McGinley	Liberal
48th	1974–1978	Eugene McGinley	Liberal
49th	1978–1983	Paul Kenny	Liberal
50th	1983–1987	Paul Kenny	Liberal
51st	1987–1991	Paul Kenny	Liberal
52nd	1991–1995	Marcelle Mersereau	Liberal
53rd	1995–1999	Marcelle Mersereau	Liberal
54th	1999–2003	Marcelle Mersereau	Liberal
55th	2003–2006	Brian Kenny	Liberal
56th	2006–2010	Brian Kenny	Liberal
57th	2010–2014	Brian Kenny	Liberal
Riding dissolved into Bathurst West-Beresford and Bathurst East-Nepisiguit-Saint-Isidore
Riding recreated from Bathurst West-Beresford, Bathurst East-Nepisiguit-Saint-Isidore and Restigouche-Chaleur
61st	2024–Present	René Legacy	Liberal

== Riding associations ==
Party	CEO	HQ address	Town
New Brunswick Liberal Association	Jennifer Cleversey	1210 Youghall Drive	Bathurst

== Election results ==
=== 2024 ===
2024 New Brunswick general election
Party	Candidate	Votes	%	±%
Liberal	René Legacy	3357	56.58	+2.18
Progressive Conservative	Kim Chamberlain	2029	34.26	−0.4
Green	Robert Kryszko	325	5.49	−8.4
New Democratic	Jeff Frenette	212	3.58	+3.58
Total valid votes				
Total rejected ballots				
Turnout		5293		
Eligible voters				
Liberal hold		Swing		+2.18

2020 provincial election redistributed results
Party	%
Liberal	51.0
Progressive Conservative	34.7
Green	14.3

=== 2010 ===
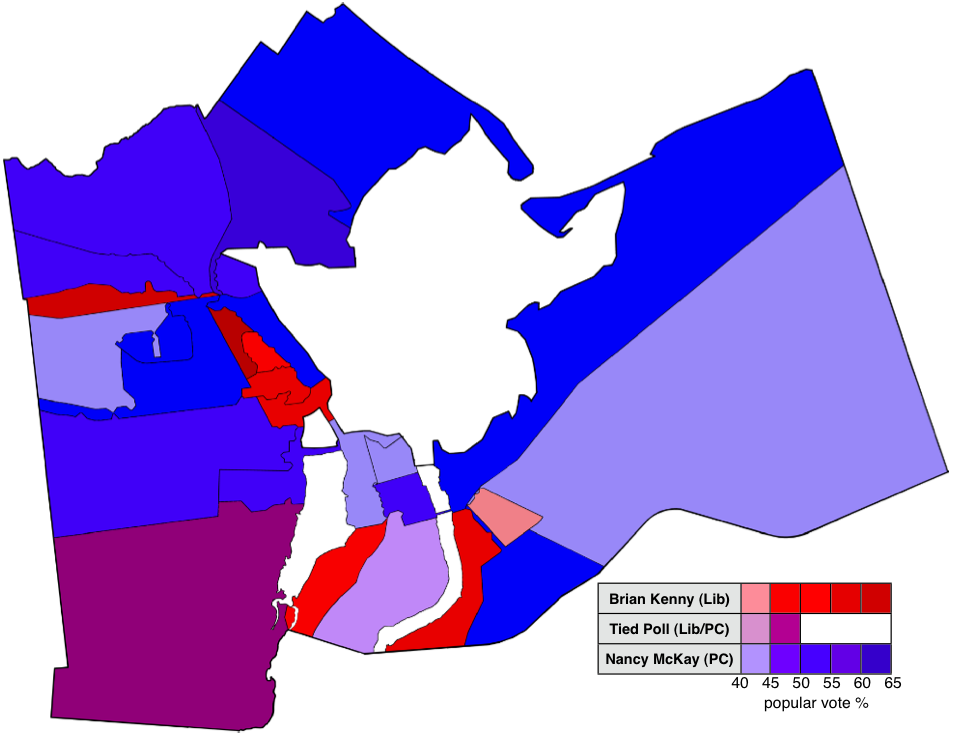
Bathurst's poll-by-poll winners for the 2010 New Brunswick election

2010 New Brunswick general election
Party	Candidate	Votes	%	±%	Expenditures
Liberal	Brian Kenny	2,899	44.99	−3.94	$27,040
Progressive Conservative	Nancy McKay	2,821	43.78	−2.31	$24,453
New Democratic	Sebastien Duke	620	9.62	+4.64	$4,122
Green	Hazel Hachey	104	1.61G	$0	
Total valid votes/expense limit		6,444	100.0		$27,883
Total rejected ballots		55	0.85		
Turnout		6,499	69.55	+2.41	
Eligible voters		9,344			
Liberal hold		Swing		−0.82	

=== 2006 ===
2006 New Brunswick general election
Party	Candidate	Votes	%	±%	Expenditures
Liberal	Brian Kenny	3,224	48.93	+0.44	$20,431
Progressive Conservative	Nancy McKay	3,037	46.09	−1.01	$24,274
New Democratic	Blair Lindsay	328	4.98	+0.58	$8,161
Total valid votes/expense limit		6,589	100.0		$26,798
Total rejected ballots		61	0.63		
Turnout		6,650	67.14	−0.88	
Eligible voters		9,756			
Liberal notional hold		Swing		+0.73	

=== 2003 ===
2003 New Brunswick general election
Party	Candidate	Votes	%	±%	Expenditures
Liberal	Brian Kenny	3,348	48.49	−5.78	$17,789
Progressive Conservative	Nancy McKay	3,252	47.10	+8.56	$22,606
New Democratic	Mark Robar	304	4.40	−2.79	$8,161
Total valid votes/expense limit		6,904	100.0		$27,018
Total rejected ballots		57	0.82		
Turnout		6,961	68.02	+4.37	
Eligible voters		10,234			
Liberal hold		Swing		−7.17	

=== 1999 ===
1999 New Brunswick general election
Party	Candidate	Votes	%	±%	Expenditures
Liberal	Marcelle Mersereau	3,418	54.27	−21.24	$15,701
Progressive Conservative	Robert "Bob" Stairs	2,427	38.54	+27.95	$11,503
New Democratic	Antoine Duguay	453	7.19	−5.37	$600
Total valid votes/expense limit		6,298	100.0		$23,290
Total rejected ballots		60	0.60		
Turnout		6,358	63.65	−4.20	
Eligible voters		9,989			
Liberal hold		Swing		−23.61	

=== 1995 ===
1995 New Brunswick general election
Party	Candidate	Votes	%	±%	Expenditures
Liberal	Marcelle Mersereau	4,956	75.51	+19.18	$17,079
New Democratic	Kim Power	824	12.56	+0.98	$4,387
Progressive Conservative	Graham Wiseman	695	10.59	−3.68	$3,703
Natural Law	William Parker	88	1.34	–	$0
Total valid votes/expense limit		6,563	100.0		$22,000
Total rejected ballots		82	0.84		
Turnout		6,645	67.85	−2.69	
Eligible voters		9,793			
Liberal hold		Swing		+12.22	

=== 1991 ===
1991 New Brunswick general election
Party	Candidate	Votes	%	±%	Expenditures
Liberal	Marcelle Mersereau	4,047	56.33	−22.45	$14,913
Confederation of Regions	Laurie Joseph Robichaud	1,280	17.82	−	$5,407
Progressive Conservative	Wilt Claire	1,025	14.27	+0.15	$10,496
New Democratic	Colette Buttimer	832	11.58	+4.48	$3,876
Total valid votes/expense limit		7,184	100.0		$21,191
Total rejected ballots		61	0.59		
Turnout		7,245	70.54	−6.22	
Eligible voters		10,271			
Liberal hold		Swing		−13.08	

=== 1987 ===
1987 New Brunswick general election
Party	Candidate	Votes	%	±%	Expenditures
Liberal	Paul Kenny	6,281	78.78	+39.07	$17,318
Progressive Conservative	René Pratt	1,126	14.12	−18.75	$11,480
New Democratic	Richard Doucet	566	7.10	−20.32	$913
Total valid votes/expense limit		7,973	100.0		$17,728
Total rejected ballots		42	0.40		
Turnout		8,015	76.76	−4.32	
Eligible voters		10,442			
Liberal hold		Swing		+28.91	

=== 1982 ===
1982 New Brunswick general election
Party	Candidate	Votes	%	±%	Expenditures
Liberal	Paul Kenny	3,406	39.71	+4.05	$12,591
Progressive Conservative	Jim MacLaggan	2,820	32.87	+5.12	$12,453
New Democratic	Kevin Mann Jr.	2,352	27.42	−1.68	$11,419
Total valid votes/expense limit		8,578	100.0		$15,102
Total rejected ballots		47	0.40		
Turnout		8,625	76.76	−4.32	
Eligible voters		10,442			
Liberal hold		Swing		−0.54	

=== 1978 ===
1978 New Brunswick general election
Party	Candidate	Votes	%	±%	Expenditures
Liberal	Paul Kenny	2,667	35.66	−17.33	$12,132
New Democratic	Kevin Mann	2,176	29.10	+26.76	$2,929
Progressive Conservative	John A. Duffy	2,075	27.75	−10.87	$10,799
Parti acadien	Lucie Losier	560	7.49	+1.43	$50
Total valid votes/expense limit		7,478	100.0		$14,625
Total rejected ballots		101	1.03		
Turnout		7,579	76.98	+3.11	
Eligible voters		9,846			
Liberal hold		Swing		−7.81	

=== 1974 ===
1974 New Brunswick general election
Party	Candidate	Votes	%	±%
Liberal	Eugene McGinley	3,806	52.99	+2.43
Progressive Conservative	Jean-Paul Lavoie	2,774	38.62	−3.59
Parti acadien	Jean-Pierre Lanteigne	435	6.06	–
New Democratic	Lionel Hachey	168	2.34	–
Total valid votes		7,183	100.0	
Total rejected ballots		58	0.59	
Turnout		7,241	73.87	+11.55
Eligible voters		9,803		
Liberal hold		Swing		+6.02

=== 1972 by-election ===
New Brunswick provincial by-election, 1972
Party	Candidate	Votes	%	±%
Liberal	Eugene McGinley	3,095	50.56	−9.38
Progressive Conservative	Nicholas Dimitroff	2,584	42.21	+2.15
Independent	Louis L. Boudreau	443	7.24	–
Total valid votes		6,122	100.0	
Total rejected ballots		59	0.59	
Turnout		6,181	62.32	−20.49
Eligible voters		9,918		
Liberal hold		Swing		−5.77
Held upon the death of H. H. Williamson

=== 1970 ===
1970 New Brunswick general election
Party	Candidate	Votes	%	±%
Liberal	H. H. Williamson	4,142	59.94	−10.21
Progressive Conservative	J. Adolphus Picot	2,768	40.06	+6.21
Total valid votes		6,910	100.0	
Total rejected ballots		105	1.24	
Turnout		7,015	82.81	+11.55
Eligible voters		8,471		
Liberal hold		Swing		−8.21

=== 1967 ===
1967 New Brunswick general election
Party	Candidate	Votes	%
Liberal	Harry H. Williamson	4,376	66.15
Progressive Conservative	Ian Tower	2,239	33.84
Total valid votes		6,615	100.0
Eligible voters		7,709	
This was a new district created out of Gloucester which went totally Liberal in the previous election.

== See also ==
- List of New Brunswick provincial electoral districts
- Canadian provincial electoral districts
