= Andrew Harvey (politician) =

Canadian politician

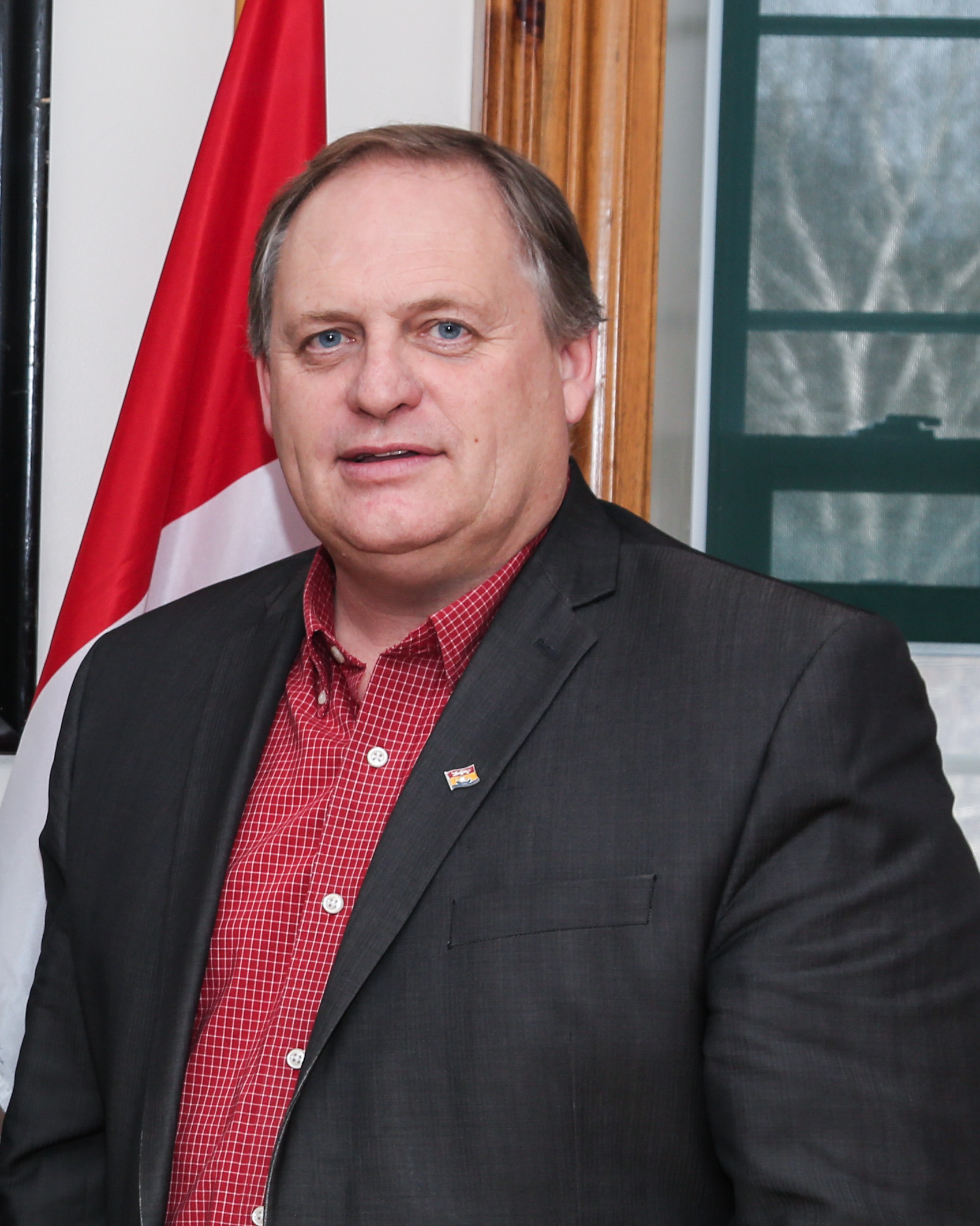

Minister of Environment and Local Government
- In office October 5, 2018 – November 8, 2018
- Premier: Brian Gallant
- Preceded by: Serge Rousselle
- Succeeded by: Jeff Carr

Minister of Agriculture, Mines, and Rural Affairs
- In office September 5, 2017 – November 8, 2018
- Premier: Brian Gallant
- Preceded by: Rick Doucet
- Succeeded by: Ross Wetmore (Agriculture, Aquaculture, and Fisheries)

Member of the New Brunswick Legislative Assembly for Carleton-Victoria
- In office September 22, 2014 – August 17, 2020

Personal details
- Party: Liberal
- Parent: Fred Harvey

Andrew Bruce Harvey is a Canadian politician, who was elected to the Legislative Assembly of New Brunswick in the 2014 provincial election. He represented the electoral district of Carleton-Victoria as a member of the Liberal Party until his defeat in the 2020 New Brunswick general election.

Harvey was named to the Select Committee on Cannabis, pursuant to Motion 31 of the 3rd session of the 58th New Brunswick Legislature.
