= 2019 New Brunswick Liberal Association leadership election =

- Date: June 22, 2019 (cancelled due to acclamation)
- Convention: Saint John, New Brunswick
- Resigning leader: Brian Gallant
- Won by: Kevin Vickers (acclaimed)
- Ballots: 1
- Candidates: 1
- Entrance fee: $20,000

The New Brunswick Liberal Association scheduled a leadership convention for June 22, 2019, in Saint John, New Brunswick, as a result of Brian Gallant's announcement on November 15, 2018, that he will be resigning as party leader. On December 28, 2018, he announced that he would be stepping down effective the next Liberal caucus meeting, in February 2019, when an interim leader was chosen. As the Progressive Conservatives are leading a minority government, a leadership election was to be held quickly so that a new leader can be in place in case there is an early general election. The deadline for candidates to file was March 29, 2019. Following the withdrawal of René Ephestion, Kevin Vickers was the only candidate for the position. The party's executive board declared Vickers to be acclaimed on April 16, 2019. He assumed the leadership officially on April 24, 2019.

== Declared candidate ==
- Kevin Vickers, (former Canadian ambassador to Ireland and former Sergeant-at-Arms of the House of Commons of Canada, best known for his role in ending the October 22, 2014, shootings at Parliament Hill by shooting gunman Zehaf-Bibeau.)

== Withdrawn ==
- René Ephestion (Executive Director of Nazareth House in Moncton, leader of the New Brunswick Liberal Multicultural Inclusion Commission) Ephestion, a French citizen in the process of obtaining Canadian citizenship, announced his withdrawal on April 9, 2019.

== Declined ==
- Benoît Bourque (MLA for Kent South)
- Susan Holt (2018 Liberal candidate in Fredericton South)
- Wayne Long (MP for Saint John—Rothesay)
- Roger Melanson (MLA for Dieppe)
- Gaétan Pelletier (businessman), endorsed Vickers
- Stephanie Tomilson (2018 Liberal candidate in Rothesay)
