= People's Alliance of New Brunswick =

People's Alliance of New Brunswick Alliance des gens du Nouveau-Brunswick
- Founder: Kris Austin
- Founded: June 9, 2010; 16 years ago
- Dissolved: June 30, 2025; 15 months ago
- Headquarters: Fredericton, New Brunswick
- Ideology: Conservatism (Canadian); Economic liberalism; Right-wing populism
- Political position: Right-wing
- Colours: Purple

Website
- peoplesalliance.ca at the Wayback Machine (archived 2022-12-24)

The People's Alliance of New Brunswick (PANB) was a provincial political party in the Canadian province of New Brunswick. It was formed in 2010. The party has been described as being right-wing populist. In the 2018 election, the party won three seats in the provincial legislature for the first time since its founding. The party advocated for "common sense" government and the abolition of the Office of the Commissioner of Official Languages, with a transfer of that office's responsibilities to the office of the provincial ombudsman. The party's platform has been described as "a mixture of economic conservatism, rural populism and opposition to some aspects of official bilingualism and duality".

== History ==
The People's Alliance Party of New Brunswick was created in the spring of 2010 amidst opposition to the provincial government's plan to sell NB Power to Hydro-Québec, and was officially registered on June 9, 2010.

In the provincial election held on September 27, 2010, the party aimed to run as many candidates as possible. It nominated 14, none of whom were elected. The party won 4,365 votes in those ridings.

Kris Austin, a former interdenominational minister and candidate for the Progressive Conservative Party nomination in the Grand Lake-Gagetown riding, was leader from 2010 to 2022. He was the Deputy Mayor of Minto from 2012 to 2016.

=== Relationship with Francophone communities ===
Following the 2018 election, representatives of Acadian and Francophone civil society denounced the party and its election platform. The party was deemed infréquentable ("not to be associated with") by 14 Acadian associations and 19 mayors of Francophone municipalities who criticized their "anti-Francophone and anti-equality" positions.

=== 2014 election ===
The People's Alliance fielded 18 candidates in the 2014 provincial election. In mid-August the governing Progressive Conservatives threatened to pull out of the CBC, Rogers, and CTV leaders debates if People's Alliance leader Kris Austin or Green leader David Coon were allowed into the televised debates. CBC stood its ground, citing the right of all New Brunswickers to see and hear all five leaders debate the issues. PC leader David Alward reversed his decision soon after, when CBC prepared to go ahead with the debate without him. Rogers soon followed suit, reversing its earlier decision to keep Austin and Coon out. In the end, only CTV (Bell Media) kept Austin and Coon out of its roundtable debate, which was aired three days before election night.

The party did not win any seats in the election; however, leader Kris Austin missed being elected by only 26 votes in the riding of Fredericton-Grand Lake. Austin was granted a recount, but the recount upheld the election night results with only one additional vote going to Austin than originally counted.

The party had two third-place finishes with LeRoy Armstrong in Sussex-Fundy-St.Martins and deputy leader Wes Gullison in Southwest Miramichi-Bay du Vin.

=== 2018 election ===
In the 2018 election, the party won three seats in the provincial legislature. Party leader Kris Austin was elected in Fredericton-Grand Lake, Rick DeSaulniers was elected in Fredericton-York, and Michelle Conroy was elected in Miramichi, unseating two-time Liberal Cabinet Minister Bill Fraser. The party won 12.58 percent of the popular vote.

=== 2019 legislative developments ===
At a December 18, 2018 committee meeting, MLAs of the province increased the budget of the Auditor General by $1 million, something that had long been in the platform of the People's Alliance. The Commissioner of Official Languages also received a 25 percent budget increase, even though the People's Alliance campaigned on abolishing the office. The constituency office budget was also increased by $10,000 to $50,000 for each MLA. This budget had not seen an increase in ten years, and the money went towards office expenses in each constituency. The base budget of each party was changed to $250,000 with an additional $25,000 per MLA in the caucus. Previously, third parties like the People's Alliance received minimal funding on an ad hoc basis. The raise was met with criticism by the Liberal opposition, as cuts were subsequently made to infrastructure projects in sectors including healthcare and education.

=== 2020 election ===
In the 2020 provincial election, Austin and Conroy were re-elected while Rick DeSaulniers was defeated. The party won 8.95 percent of the popular vote.

=== 2022 de-registration and re-registration ===
Kris Austin and Michelle Conroy announced their departures from the People's Alliance of New Brunswick to join the Progressive Conservatives on March 30, 2022. The People's Alliance of New Brunswick was deregistered as a provincial party on March 31, 2022. In April 2022, interim leader Rick DeSaulniers and party announced plans to re-register as a party. Elections New Brunswick confirmed the party was re-registered in May 2022 and DeSaulniers was chosen to be the party leader.

=== 2025 final de-registration ===
On June 30, 2025, the People's Alliance of New Brunswick was voluntarily deregistered. This decision was announced on July 2.

== Leaders ==
Leader	Term of office		Notes
Kris Austin	June 5, 2010	March 30, 2022	
Rick DeSaulniers	April 22, 2022	June 30, 2025	Interim leader from April 22, 2022 to May 28, 2022

== People's Alliance MLAs ==
Member	District	Tenure
Kris Austin	Fredericton-Grand Lake	2018—2022
Michelle Conroy	Miramichi	2018—2022
Rick DeSaulniers	Fredericton-York	2018—2020

== Election results ==
Election	Leader	Votes	%	Seats	+/–	Position	Government
2010	Kris Austin	4,363	1.2	0 / 55	0	▲5th	No seats
2014	Kris Austin	7,964	2.1	0 / 49	0	5th	No seats
2018	Kris Austin	47,709	12.6	3 / 49	▲3	▲3rd	Support PC minority
2020	Kris Austin	33,592	8.9	2 / 49	▼1	▼4th	No status
2024	Rick DeSaulniers	3,078	0.9	0 / 49	▼2	▼5th	No seats

=== By-elections ===
By-election	Date	Candidate	Votes	%	Place
Saint John East	November 17, 2014	Arthur Watson	38	0.76%	5/5
Carleton	October 5, 2015	Randall Leavitt	95	1.48%	5/5
Miramichi Bay-Neguac	June 20, 2022	Thomas L'Huillier	172	3.38%	4/5
Southwest Miramichi-Bay du Vin	June 20, 2022	Larry Lynch	363	7.46%	3/4
