= KISS NB =

Keep It Simple Solutions, New Brunswick
- Former provincial party
- Leader: Gerald Bourque
- Founded: 2017
- Dissolved: 2020
- Headquarters: 208 Upper Woodlands Road; Woodlands, New Brunswick; E6B 1N1
- Ideology: Fiscal conservatism
- Colours: Yellow
- Seats in Legislature: 0 / 49

Website
- kissnb.com

KISS NB (Keep It Simple Solutions, New Brunswick), founded in 2017 by former dairy farmer and ambulance volunteer, Gerald Bourque, is a defunct political party based in the province of New Brunswick, Canada.

The party was created to advocate for the creation of a provincial constitution that would put strict limits on the borrowing and spending powers of the provincial government of New Brunswick. As of 2020 and the subsequent years of the COVID pandemic, KISS NB has also taken a hardline stance against vaccine mandates and lockdown measures taken by the Blaine Higgs led provincial government.

While the party fielded candidates in nine ridings during the 2018 New Brunswick provincial elections, no seats were won.

The founder, Bourque previously ran in the riding of Fredericton-York in the 2014 provincial election as an independent, receiving 2.9 per cent of the vote.

The party was officially registered in March 2018, but was deregistered after the election on 31 October 2018 for failing to run at least ten candidates in the 2018 election.

The party was reregistered on 26 August 2020 as the KISS N.B. Political Party and fielded four candidates in the 2020 election. After failing to nominate ten candidates again, the party was deregistered for a second time on October 31, 2020.

== Election results ==
Election	Leader	Votes	%	Seats	+/–	Position	Government
2018	Gerald Bourque	366	0.10	0 / 49	▲0	▲6th	No seats
2020	Gerald Bourque	124	0.04	0 / 49	0	6th	No seats

=== Results by riding (2018) ===
Riding	Candidate	Votes
Restigouche West	Travis Pollock	62
Bathurst West-Beresford	James Risdon	64
Southwest Miramichi-Bay du Vin	Dawson Brideau	19
Gagetown-Petitcodiac	Carolyn MacDonald	56
Fredericton-Grand Lake	Gerald Bourque	19
New Maryland-Sunbury	Danelle Titus	14
Fredericton-York	Sandra Bourque (Note: Wife of Gerald Bourque)	34
Carleton-York	Lloyd Maurey	40
Carleton-Victoria	Carter Edgar	58
