= University of New Brunswick Libraries =

Library system in Canada

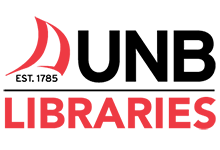
- Location: Fredericton and Saint John, New Brunswick, Canada
- Type: Academic library
- Branches: 5

Collection
- Size: 1.5 million

Access and use
- Circulation: 140,000

Other information
- Director: Lesley Balcom
- Parent organisation: University of New Brunswick
- Website: lib.unb.ca

University of New Brunswick Libraries is the library system of the University of New Brunswick in New Brunswick, Canada. It has a collection size containing 1,500,000 volumes, while circulating 140,000 items annually.

It is headquartered at UNB Fredericton's main library building, the Harriet Irving Library, which was opened in 1967. The University of New Brunswick's other libraries, including the Hans W. Klohn Commons in the Saint John Campus, serves as a branch of this library.

== History ==
The University of New Brunswick's first academic library, the Bonar Law-Bennett Building, opened in 1931.

The University of New Brunswick's Saint John campus opened its first library, the Ward Chipman Library, in 1969. In 2011, the library was replaced by the newly-built Hans W. Klohn Commons. In 2023, the Ward Chipman Library was demolished to make way for construction of the Health and Social Innovation Centre.
