= SCL =

SCL may refer to:

== Computing ==
- System Control Language, of the ICL VME operating system
- SC++L, the C++ standard library
- Software Collections in the CentOS Linux distribution
- System Command Language of the NOS/VE CDC Cyber operating system
- Structured Control Language, for programming PLCs

== Language ==
- Shina language, spoken by the Shina people in Gilgit-Baltistan, Pakistan

== Organizations ==
- SCL Group, a British data analysis and communication company
- Seattle City Light, public utility in Seattle, Washington, United States
- Southeastern Composers League
- Stanford Center on Longevity (SCL) Stanford University; see Stanford University centers and institutes
- National Senior Classical League
- Society of Chief Librarians, former name of Libraries Connected, British public library organisation
- Society of Construction Law
- IATA airport code for Arturo Merino Benítez International Airport (Santiago International Airport)

== Science and technology ==
- Sculptor (constellation), astronomical abbreviation
- Semi-Conductor Laboratory of the Department of Space of India
- Serial clock, a signal in I²C electronic messaging bus
- Short circuit level
- Skin conductance level, in medicine
- Sleep Convention Logic, a typo of asynchronous logic
- Structural composite lumber, an engineered wood
- Substation Configuration Language, for electrical substations

== Other ==
- Arturo Merino Benítez International Airport, Santiago, Chile by IATA airport code
- Seaboard Coast Line Railroad, by reporting mark
- Security characteristic line, plotting performance of a security
- Sha Tin to Central Link of the Hong Kong MTR transit system
- Studies in Canadian Literature, a literary journal
- Swiss Challenge League, second-highest association football league in Switzerland
- Silchar railway station (station code: SCL), Assam, India

== See also ==
- Symptom Checklist 90 (SCL-90-R), psychometric instrument
