= Health and Social Innovation Centre =

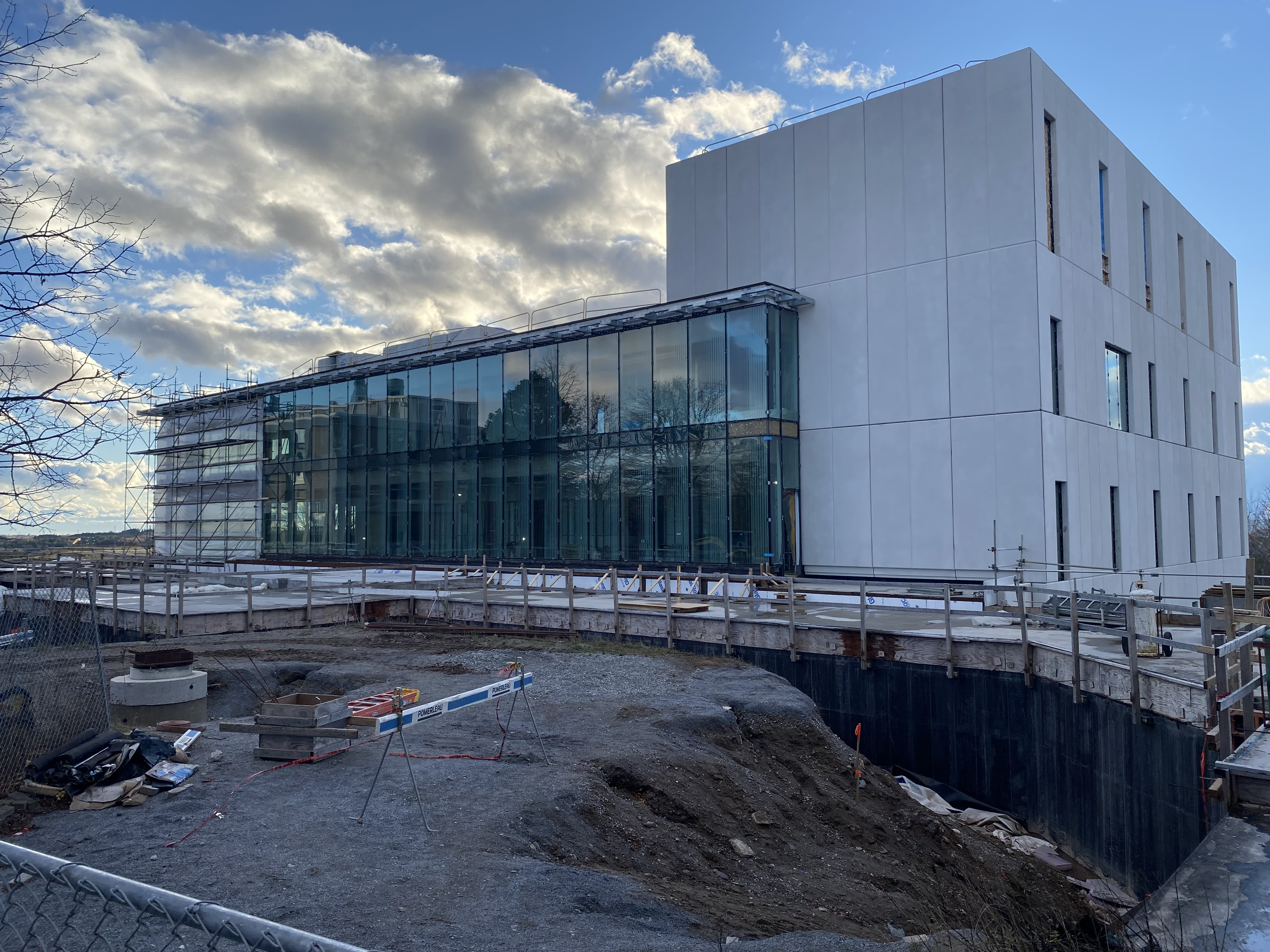

Geography
- Location: Saint John, New Brunswick, Canada
- Coordinates: 45.3058°N 66.0859°W

Organization
- Affiliated university: University of New Brunswick

Links
- Website: unb.ca/integrated-health/building.html

The Health and Social Innovation Centre (HSIC) is a planned academic and research facility at the University of New Brunswick (UNB) Saint John campus in Saint John, New Brunswick, Canada. Currently under construction, the centre is designed to house UNB's Integrated Health Initiative (IHI).

== History ==
The project was officially announced on December 19, 2022 by government and university officials. The announcement included $38 million in joint funding, with $27.2 million contributed by the Canadian federal and New Brunswick provincial governments, and the remainder from UNB. The site selection involved the demolition of the Ward Chipman Library, which had been vacant since the opening of the Hans W. Klohn Commons in 2011.

Groundbreaking occurred in August 2023. The design is led by Solomon Cordwell Buenz (SCB).
