= University of New Brunswick =

Canadian public university New Brunswick, Canada

- Coat of arms
- Latin: Universitas Novi Brunsvici
- Former names: Academy of Liberal Arts and Sciences (1785–1800); College of New Brunswick (1800–1828); King's College (1828–1859)
- Motto: Sapere aude (Latin)
- Motto in English: Dare to be wise
- Type: Public
- Established: 1785; 241 years ago
- Religious affiliation: Nonsectarian (since 1846; legislated in 1859)
- Academic affiliations: CARL, CUSID, CVU, Universities Canada
- Endowment: $276.505 million
- Chancellor: H. Wade MacLauchlan
- President: Kathy Wilson (acting)
- Visitor: Louise Imbeault (as Lieutenant Governor of New Brunswick)
- Faculty: 747 FTE
- Students: 11,273 (Fall 2026)
- Undergraduates: 9,464
- Postgraduates: 1,809
- Location: Fredericton (UNBF) and Saint John (UNBSJ), New Brunswick, Canada; 45°56′45″N 66°38′30″W
- Campus: Urban
- Other campuses: Moncton; Bathurst
- Newspaper: The Brunswickan, est.1867
- Colours: Red & black
- Nicknames: Reds (UNBF), Seawolves (UNBSJ)
- Sporting affiliations: ACAA, AFL, AUS, CCAA, U Sports
- Mascots: Su the Squirrel (UNBF), Seymour the Baron (UNBSJ)
- Website: unb.ca

Location of UNB Fredericton primary campus
Location of UNB Saint John primary campus

The University of New Brunswick (UNB) is a public research university with two primary campuses in Fredericton and Saint John, New Brunswick. It is the oldest English-language university in Canada (a title also claimed by the University of King's College). With Canada's oldest engineering programme, UNB is consistently ranked by the Times Higher Education amongst the top 300 engineering schools in the world, or top 3% of over 7,000 universities that offer engineering worldwide.

UNB has two main campuses: the original campus in Fredericton (UNBF), established in 1785, and a smaller campus in Saint John (UNBSJ), which opened in 1964. The Saint John campus is home to New Brunswick's anglophone medical school, Dalhousie Medicine New Brunswick, an affiliate of Dalhousie University. Additionally, there are two small satellite health sciences campuses in Moncton and Bathurst. UNB offers over 75 degrees in fourteen faculties at the undergraduate and graduate levels, with a total student enrolment of 10,777 between the two principal campuses during the 2024–2025 year. UNB was named the most entrepreneurial university in Canada at the 2014 Startup Canada Awards.

UNB was founded by Loyalists who left the United States after the American Revolution., and has educated numerous Canadian federal cabinet ministers, including Sir John Douglas Hazen, William Pugsley and Gerald Merrithew, many Premiers of New Brunswick such as Frank McKenna and Blaine Higgs, three puisne justices of the Supreme Court of Canada, Oswald Smith Crocket, James Wilfred Estey, Gérard La Forest, as well as prominent artists and writers. UNB had ties to the Confederation Poets movement; Bliss Carman and Sir Charles G.D. Roberts were alumni. Notable convocation speakers include John F. Kennedy and Robert F. Kennedy, each receiving a Doctor of Laws from UNB.

== History ==
=== Founding and charters ===
In 1783, Loyalist settlers began to build upon the ruins of a former Acadian village called Ste-Anne-des-Pays-Bas. The new settlement was named Frederick's Town in honour of Prince Frederick, son of King George III and uncle of Queen Victoria.

Initially modelled on the Anglican ideals of the former King's College in New York, the University of New Brunswick was founded in 1785 as the Academy of Liberal Arts and Sciences, following a petition to the Governor-in-Council on December 13, 1785. The petition requesting the establishment of the school, titled "The Founders' Petition of 1785," was addressed to Governor Thomas Carleton and was signed by seven Loyalist men: William Paine, William Wanton, George Sproule, Zephaniah Kingsley, Sr., John Coffin, Ward Chipman, and Adino Paddock.

To his Excellency Thomas Carleton Esquire Governor Captain General, and Commander in Chief, of the Province of New Brunswick, and the territories thereunto belonging, Vice Admiral Chancellor &c &c &c: —

Your memorialists whose names are hereunto subscribed, beg leave to represent, and state to your consideration the Necessity and expediency of an early attention to the Establishment in this Infant Province of an Academy, or School of liberal Arts and Sciences.

Your Excellency need not be reminded of the many Peculiarities attending the Settlement of this Country The Settlement of other Provinces has generally originated in the voluntary Exertions of a few enterprising Individuals, unincumbered, and prosecuting their Labor at their Leisure, and as they found it convenient, and most for their Advantage – Far different is the Situation in which the loyal Adventurers here find themselves – Many of them upon removing had Sons, whose Time of life, and former Hopes, call for an immediate attention to their Education – Many publick advantages, and many Conveniences would result to Individuals could this be affected within this Province, the Particulars of which it is unnecessary to ennumerate – Your Memorialists do therefore most earnestly request your Excellency will be pleased to grant a Charter for the establishing, and founding such an Academy . . .

In response to the request, Carleton requested a drawn "draft charter" modelled on King's College and 6,000 acres of reserved land in Fredericton Parish for the proposed institution. By an 1800 provincial charter, signed by Provincial Secretary Jonathan Odell, the Academy of Liberal Arts and Sciences was transformed into the College of New Brunswick. The college was succeeded by King's College, which was granted by royal charter in December 1827. King's College operated under the control of the Church of England until 1846 when religious qualifications were officially abolished; the college was declared non-sectarian by the provincial legislature in 1859, when it was transformed into the University of New Brunswick.

As the College of New Brunswick, the institution had its first president, James Somerville, and awarded its first degrees on February 21, 1828, to three recipients: Daniel Hailes Smith, Samuel Denny Lee Street, and Timothy Robert Wetmore.

By 1867, the University of New Brunswick had two faculties: Arts and Applied Science. It awarded the degrees of Bachelor of Arts, Bachelor of Science, Master of Arts, and Doctor of Science. The latter was awarded only in the fields of civil engineering, electrical engineering, and forestry.

In September 1886, Mary Kingsley Tibbits became the first regularly admitted female student of UNB. She was initially refused admission after passing matriculation exams in 1885. Following political intervention by MLA John Valentine Ellis, a senate committee voted in June 1886 to admit women to the university. UNB was one of only two Canadian schools offering a Forestry Engineering degree in the late 1800s (the other being the University of Toronto), so many of the first Dominion Forest Rangers (1899–1906) were UNB graduates.

=== 20th century ===
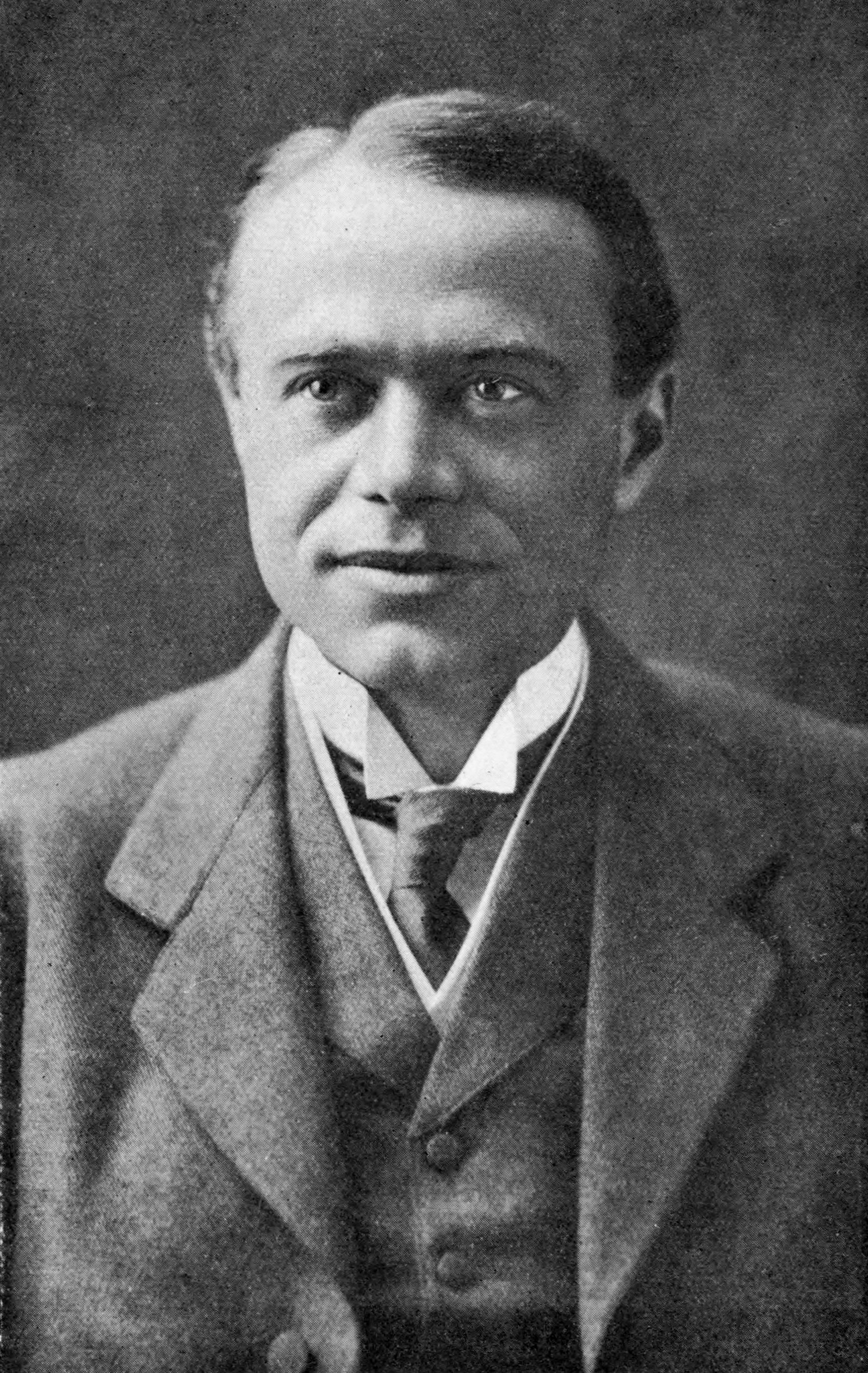
Chancellor Lord Beaverbrook, the university's greatest benefactor.

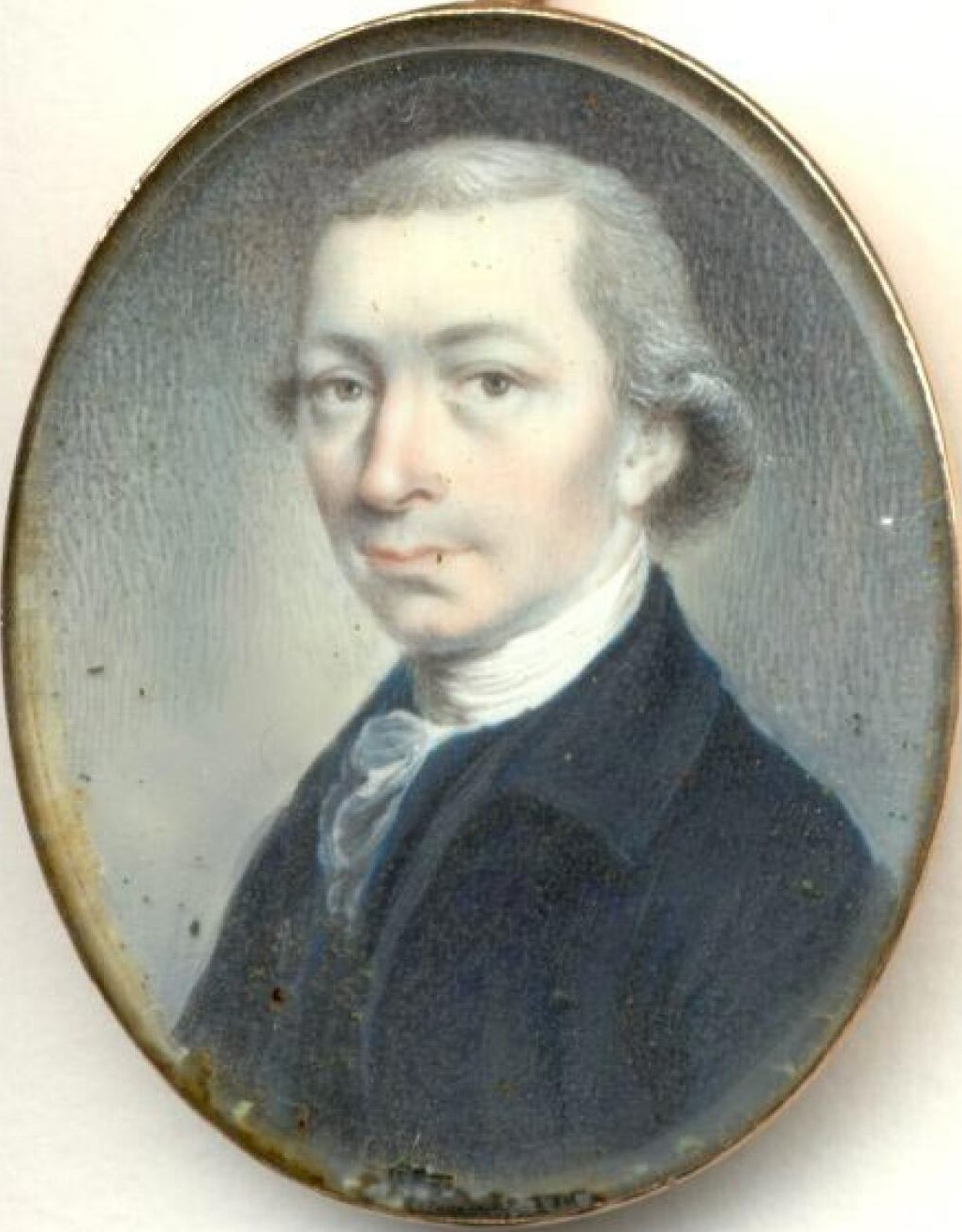
N.B. Secretary Jonathan Odell (1737–1818)

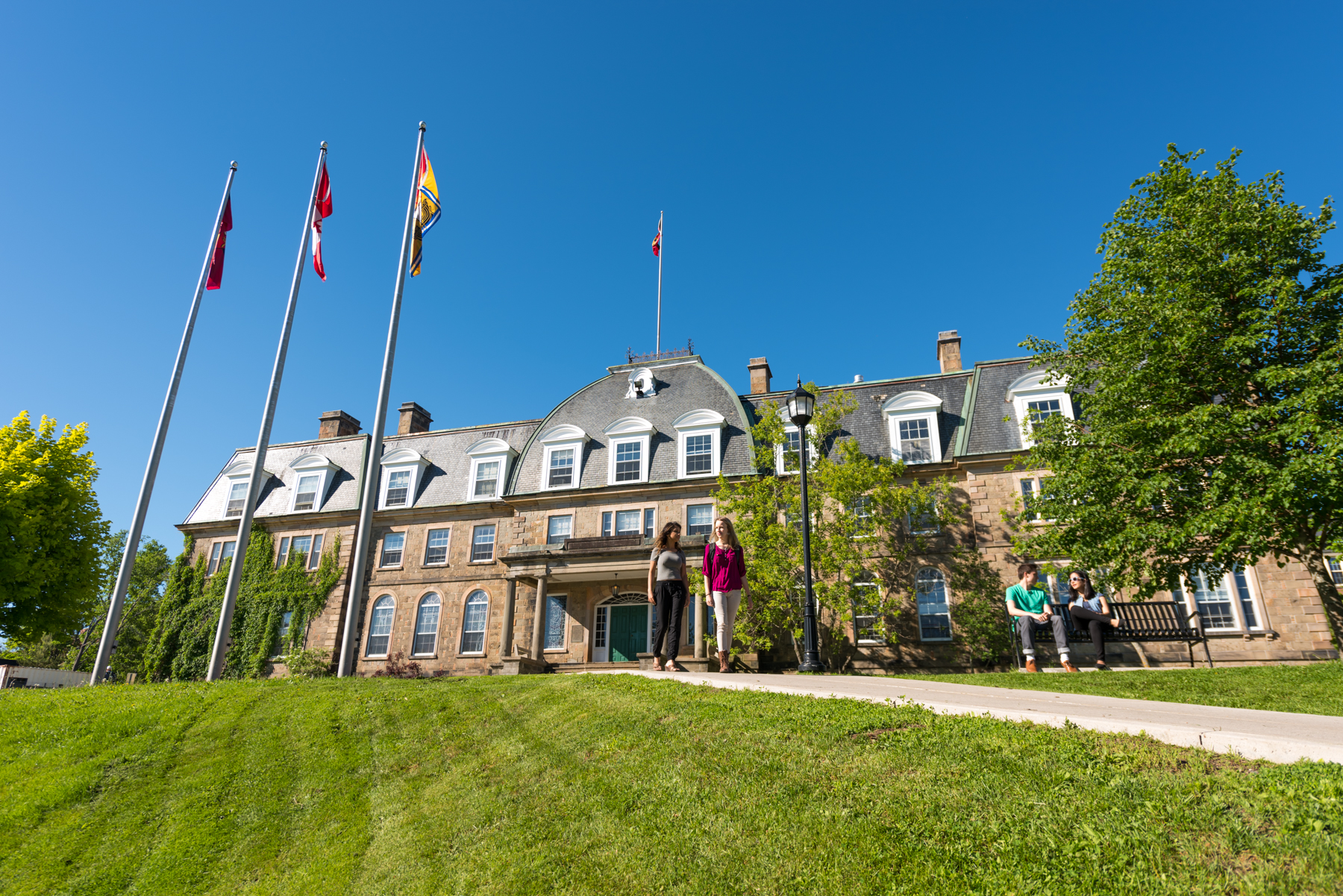
Sir Howard Douglas Hall, the Old Arts Building, Fredericton campus, is the oldest university building in the country that is still in regular use for school operations

In 1906, UNB established a bicameral system of university government consisting of a senate responsible for academic policy, and a board of governors exercising exclusive control over financial policy and other matters. The president, appointed by the board, was to provide a link between the two bodies and to provide institutional leadership. At this time, the university had 156 male students, 21 female students, and only eleven academic staff, who were all male.

In 1964, a second, smaller campus was established in Saint John, New Brunswick. The growth of the UNBSJ campus is particularly notable, for the campus began with only 96 students spread throughout various buildings in Saint John's central business district. In 1968, UNBSJ moved to its new home at Tucker Park.

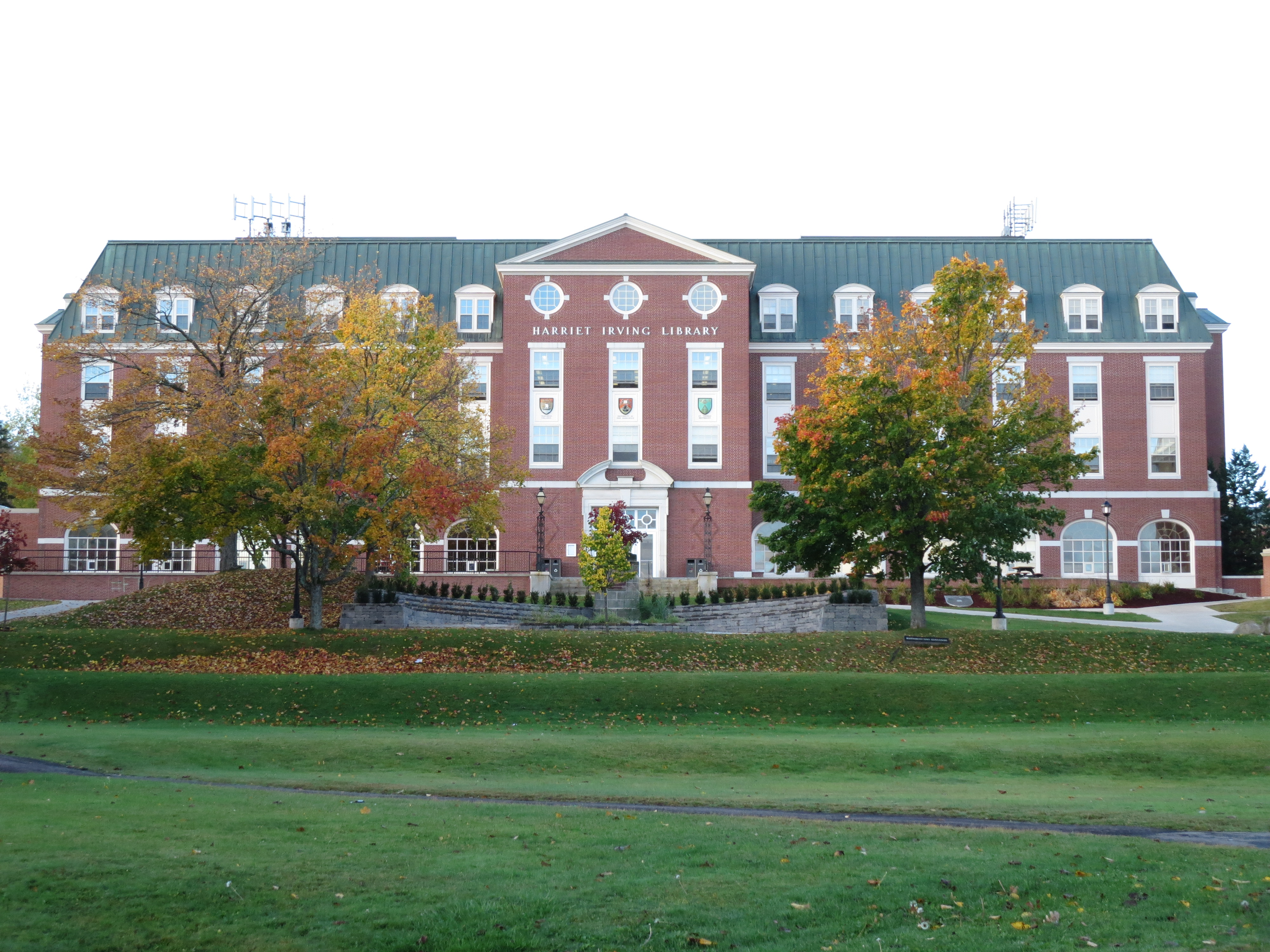
Harriet Irving Library

In 1968, the university's governance structure was reorganized with the aim of giving faculty members control of academic affairs. The UNB Act of 1968 led to the formation of two governing bodies, both chaired by the president. The Board of Governors, whose role was to oversee and give guidance to president as "chief executive officer" was to have four faculty representatives, while the majority of the Senate was to be made up of faculty members elected by their peers.

The Association of University of New Brunswick Teachers (AUNBT) was established in 1954; in 1979, this association became the bargaining agent for all full-time academic staff, and in 2008, it achieved certification for contract academic staff.

Throughout the 20th century, the University of New Brunswick held annual convocations during the month of October.

A notable convocation took place on October 8, 1957, when then United States Senator John F. Kennedy attended as a guest speaker and received an honorary Doctor of Laws degree in a ceremony presided over by Chancellor Lord Beaverbrook.

His younger brother, Robert F. Kennedy, attended another convocation on October 12, 1967, where he delivered the main address and was granted the same degree.

== Campuses ==
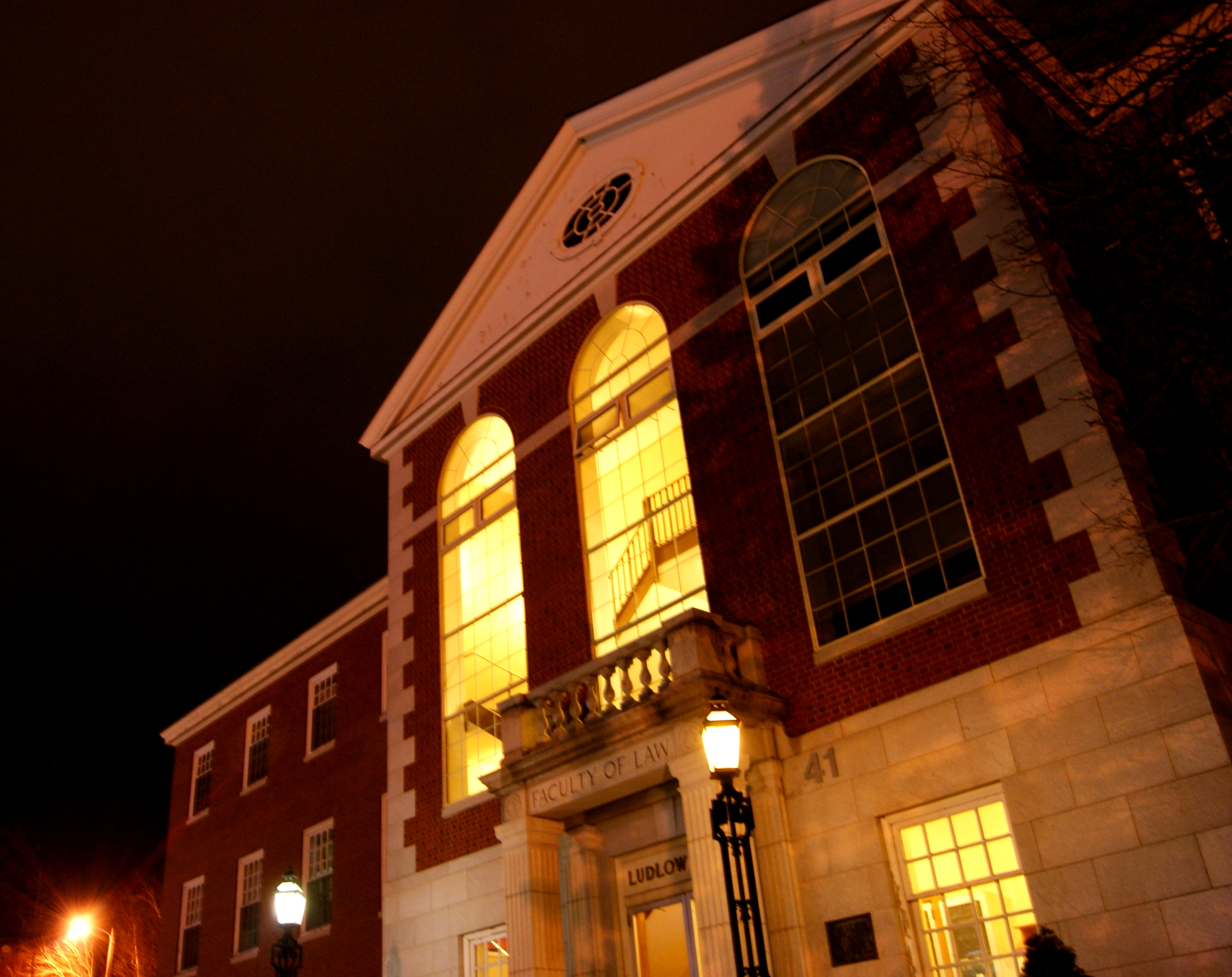
Ludlow Hall, Law Faculty

The University of New Brunswick (UNB) is split into two primary campuses: the main campus, UNB Fredericton (UNBF), in Fredericton, as well as the smaller campus, UNB Saint John (UNBSJ), which is in the Millidgeville area of New Brunswick, next to the Saint John Regional Hospital.

As of the 2024–2025 academic year, UNB had an enrolment of 10,777, or 8,536 in Fredericton (UNBF) and 2,241 in Saint John (UNBSJ). Both campuses have undergone significant expansion over the years, and many university buildings have received funding from Lord Beaverbrook and other prominent industrialists and philanthropists. UNB's largest expansion coincided with the baby boom, when its Fredericton campus tripled in size.

=== Fredericton ===
The UNB Fredericton campus is on a hill overlooking the Saint John River. The campus is well known for its colourful fall foliage, Georgian style red-brick buildings, and a very steep hill. UNB Fredericton has shared the "College Hill" with St. Thomas University (STU) since 1964, when the former St. Thomas College moved from Chatham, NB (now Miramichi). While the universities share some infrastructure, they remain separate institutions.

==== Relocation of the Faculty of Law ====
In 1959, the Faculty of Law moved from Saint John to Fredericton following a report on the status of legal education in Canada by Professor Maxwell Cohen from McGill University, claiming that the Saint John Law School was only "nominally a faculty of UNB". This prompted Chancellor Lord Beaverbrook and UNB President Colin B. Mackay to permanently move the Law School despite the Dean's objections.

==== National Historic Sites ====
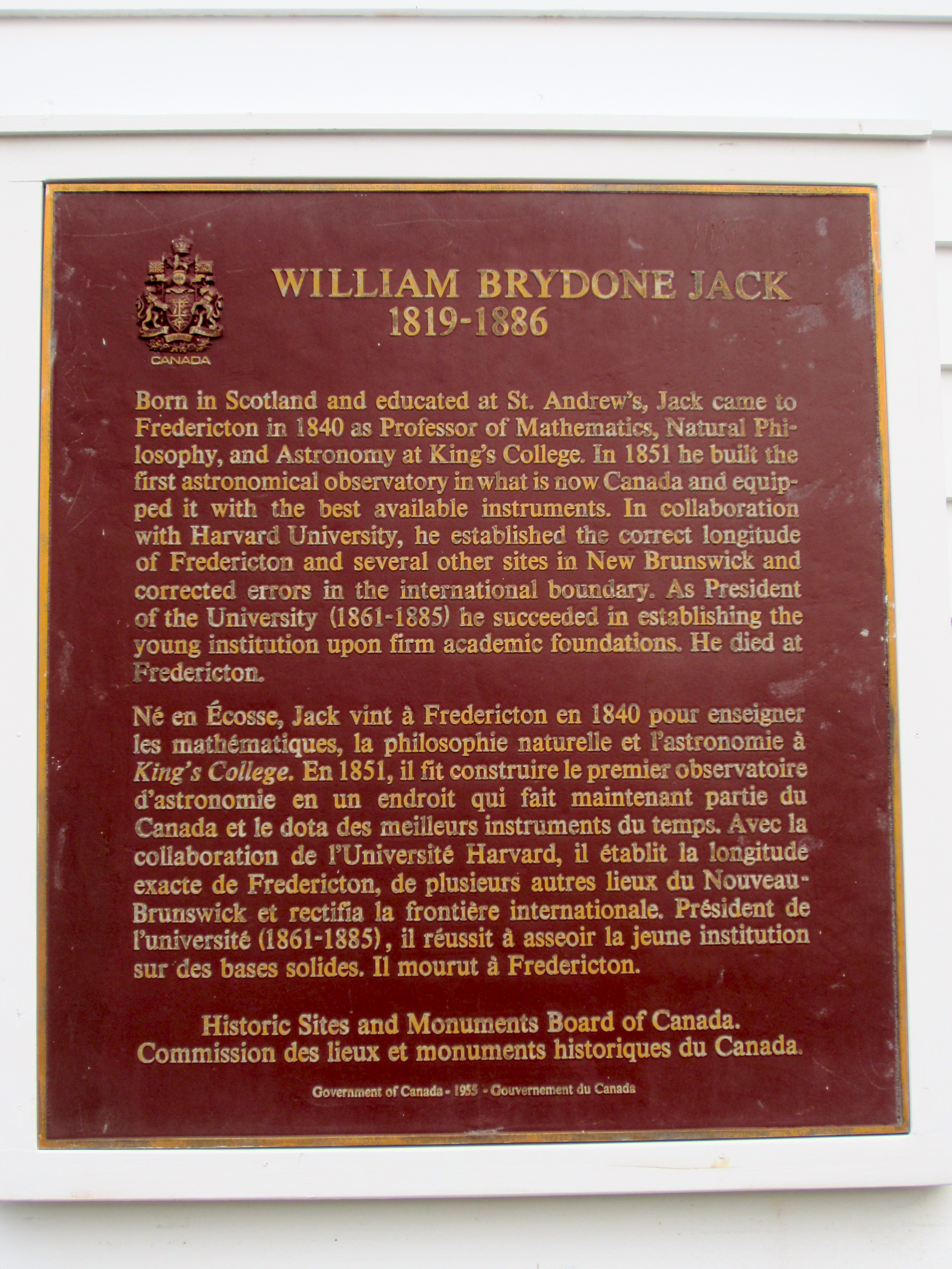
The first astronomical observatory in Canada, established in 1851 by William Brydone Jack

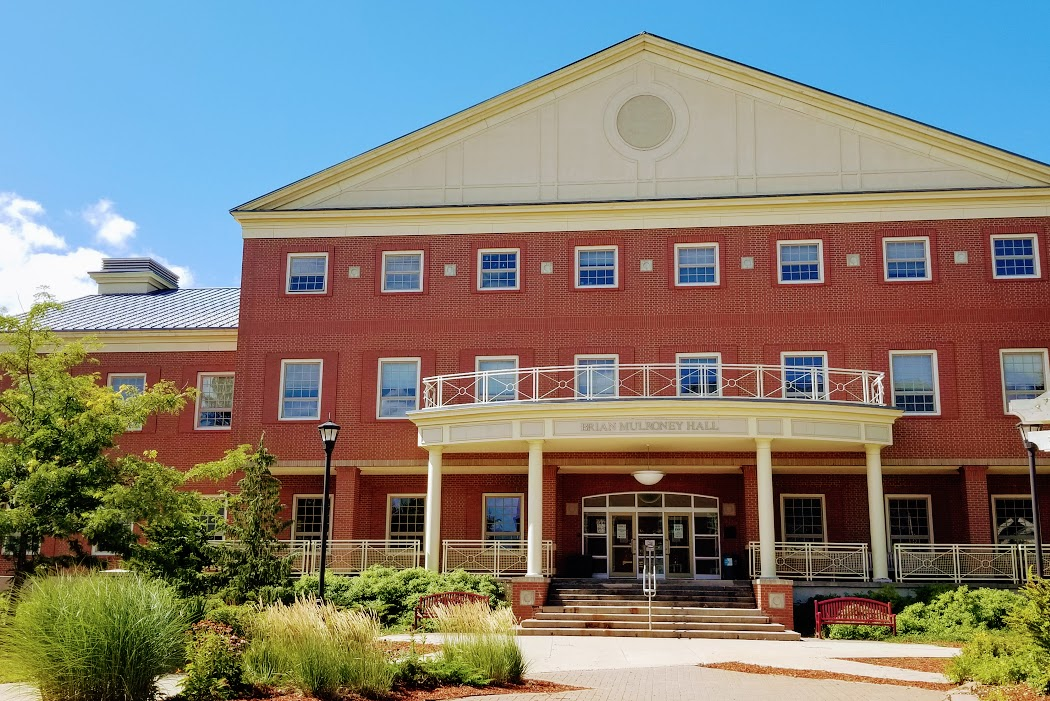
Brian Mulroney Hall, St. Thomas University

Two buildings in Fredericton have been designated National Historic Sites of Canada: the 1827 Sir Howard Douglas Hall (Old Arts), and the 1851 William Brydone Jack Observatory.

==== Architecture ====
Architect G. Ernest Fairweather designed several of the campus buildings, including the Old Civil Engineering Building (1900) and the Gymnasium (1906). In addition, several of the stained glass windows in the Convocation Hall were created by Robert McCausland Limited. UNBF's War Memorial Hall (usually referred to as Memorial Hall), originally built as a science building in 1924, honours the 35 UNB Alumni who died in World War I. UNBF's Brigadier Milton F. Gregg, V.C., Centre for the Study of War and Society (usually referred to as The Gregg Centre) was created in 2006. The Richard J. Currie Center, a five-storey 139,000-square-foot building, was constructed in 2013.

=== Saint John ===
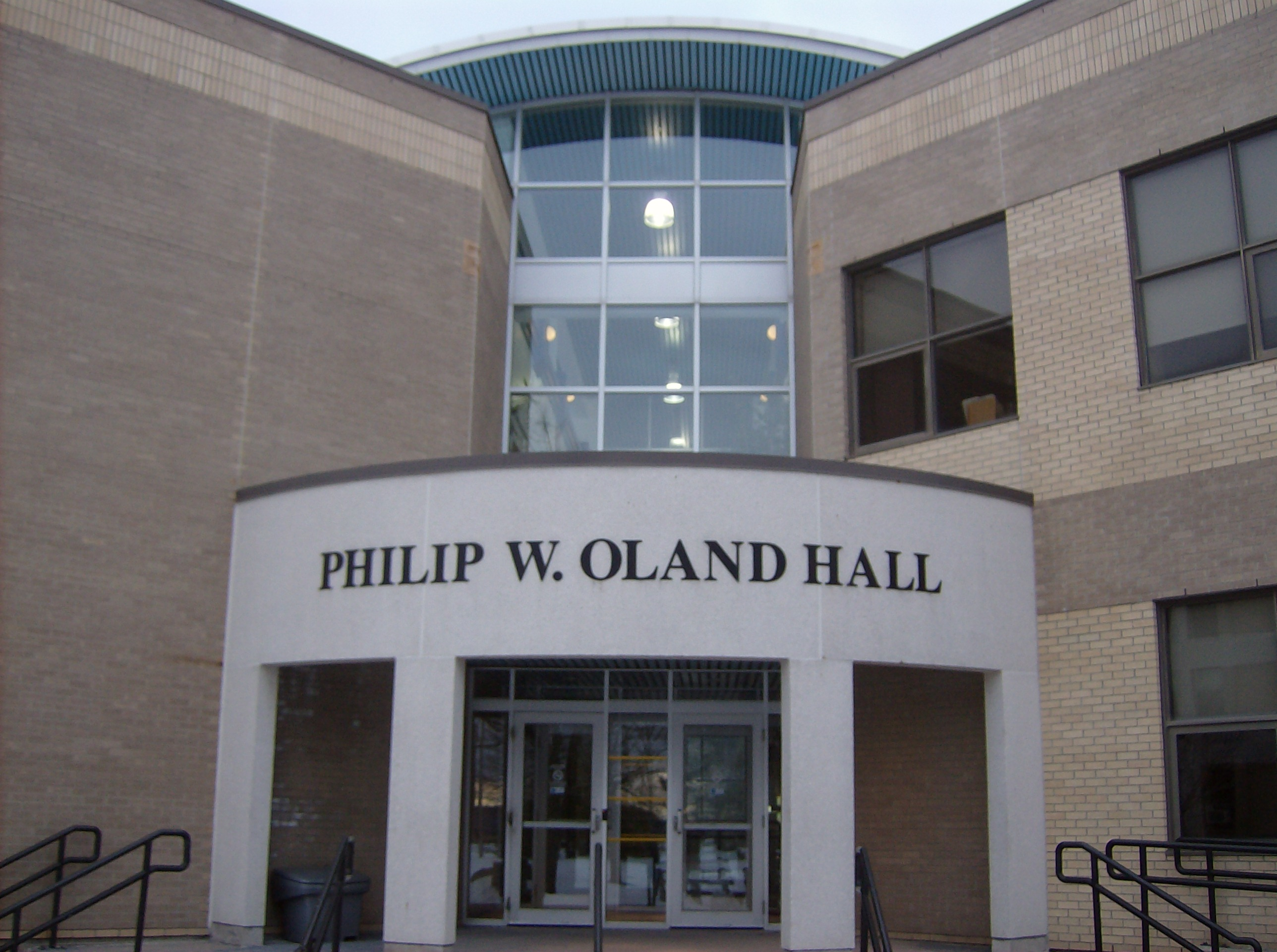
UNBSJ's Phillip W. Oland Hall (Business Department), named after Philip Oland

The UNB Saint John campus (UNBSJ) is in Tucker Park in the Millidgeville neighbourhood, several kilometres north of the city's central business district, and has views of the Kennebecasis River and Grand Bay-Westfield. New Brunswick's largest health care facility, Saint John Regional Hospital, is adjacent to the UNBSJ campus.

Aside from UNB's own facilities, the Saint John campus houses Dalhousie Medicine New Brunswick for Dalhousie University, as well as the Gerald S Merrithew Allied Health Education Centre for the New Brunswick Community College.

Dalhousie Medicine New Brunswick, which opened in the fall of 2010, is a medical school built with provincial funding that operates as a partnership between the Government of New Brunswick, the University of New Brunswick and Dalhousie University’s Faculty of Medicine. It is the first anglophone medical school programme in New Brunswick, annually serving 40 students. The New Brunswick Community College's Gerald S Merrithew Allied Health Education Centre, which opened on September 1, 2011, is near the Dalhousie Medicine New Brunswick building.

==== History ====
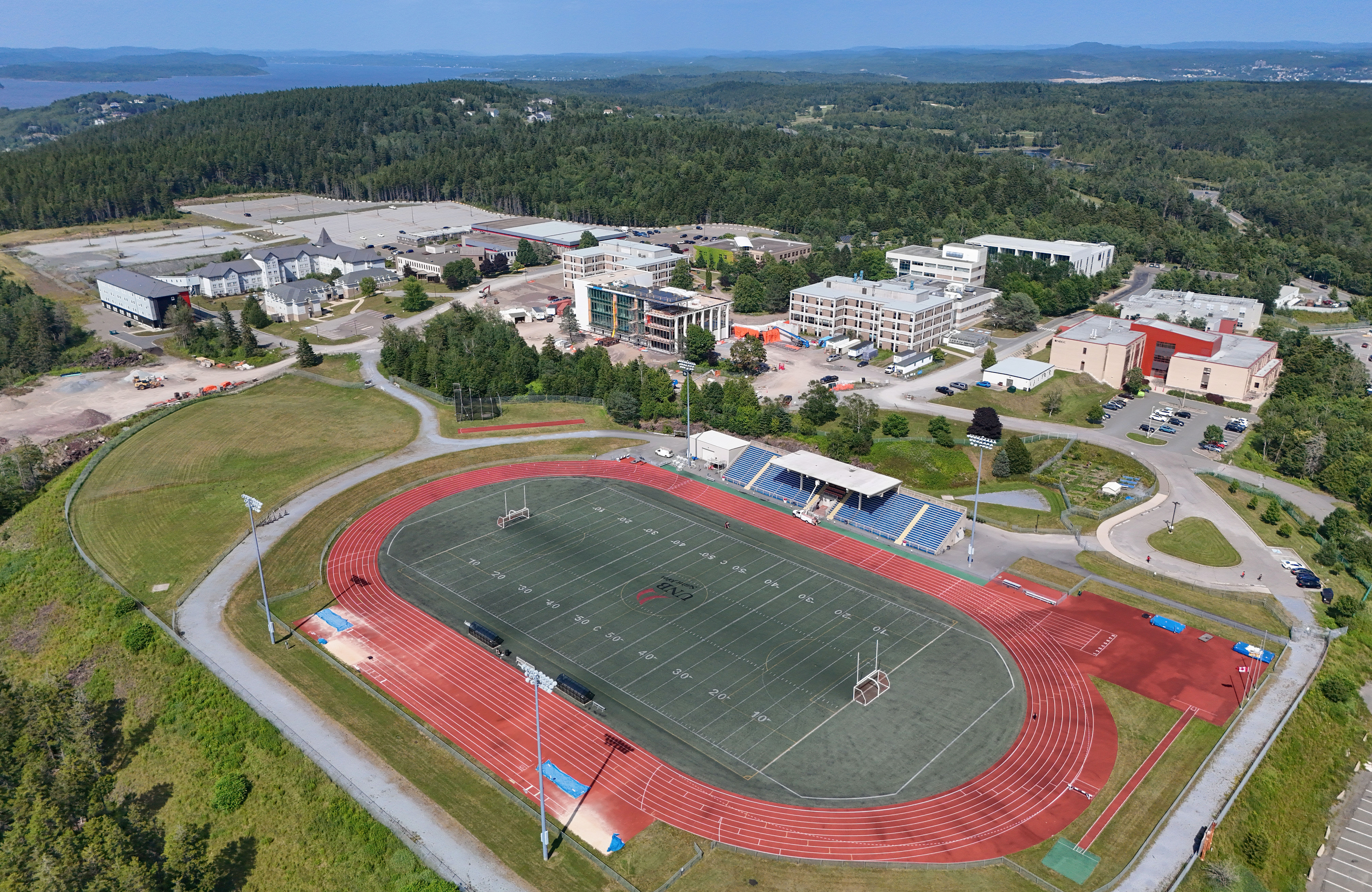
Aerial view of the UNB Saint John campus

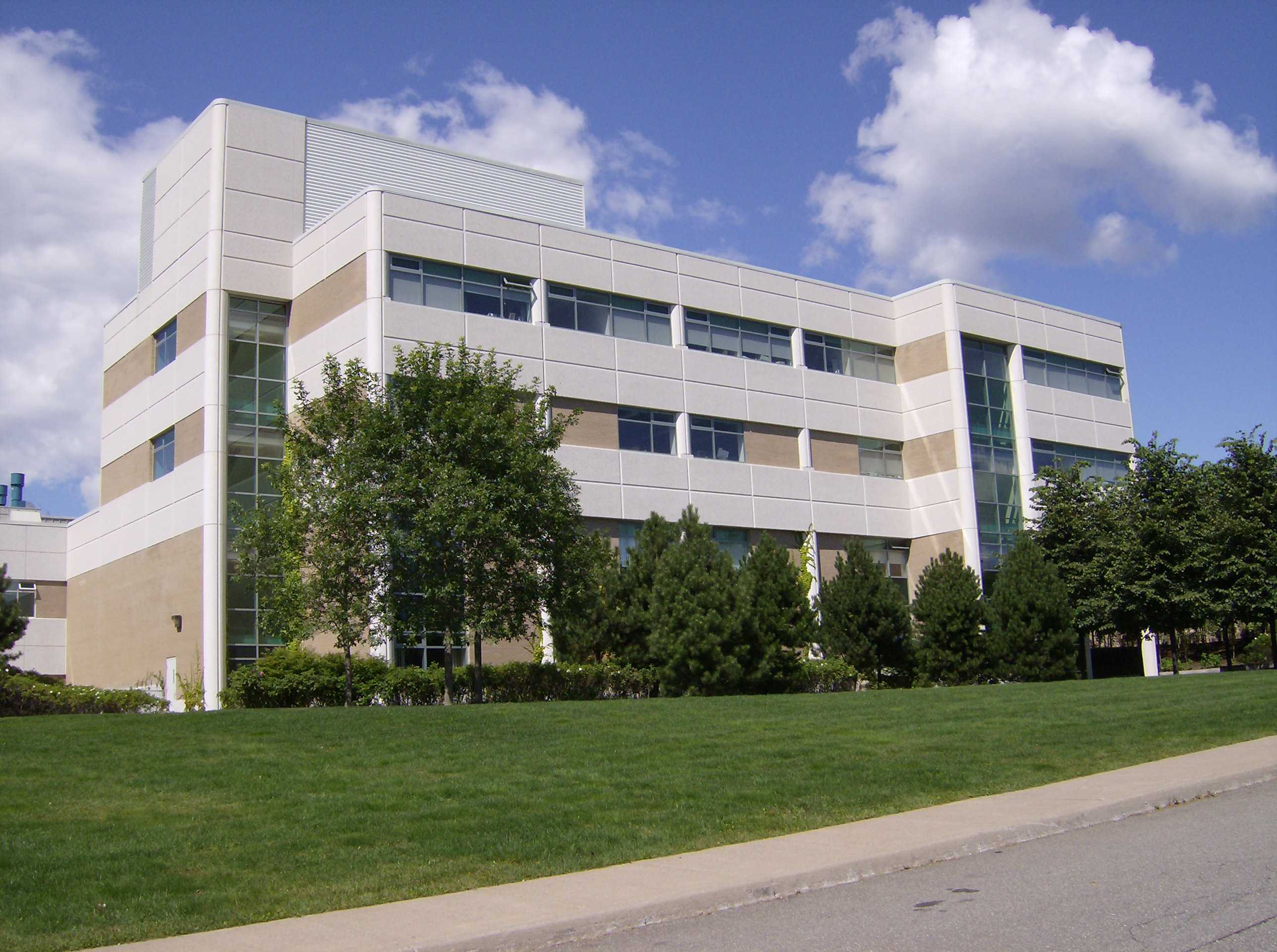
K.C. Irving Hall (Engineering Building), Saint John campus

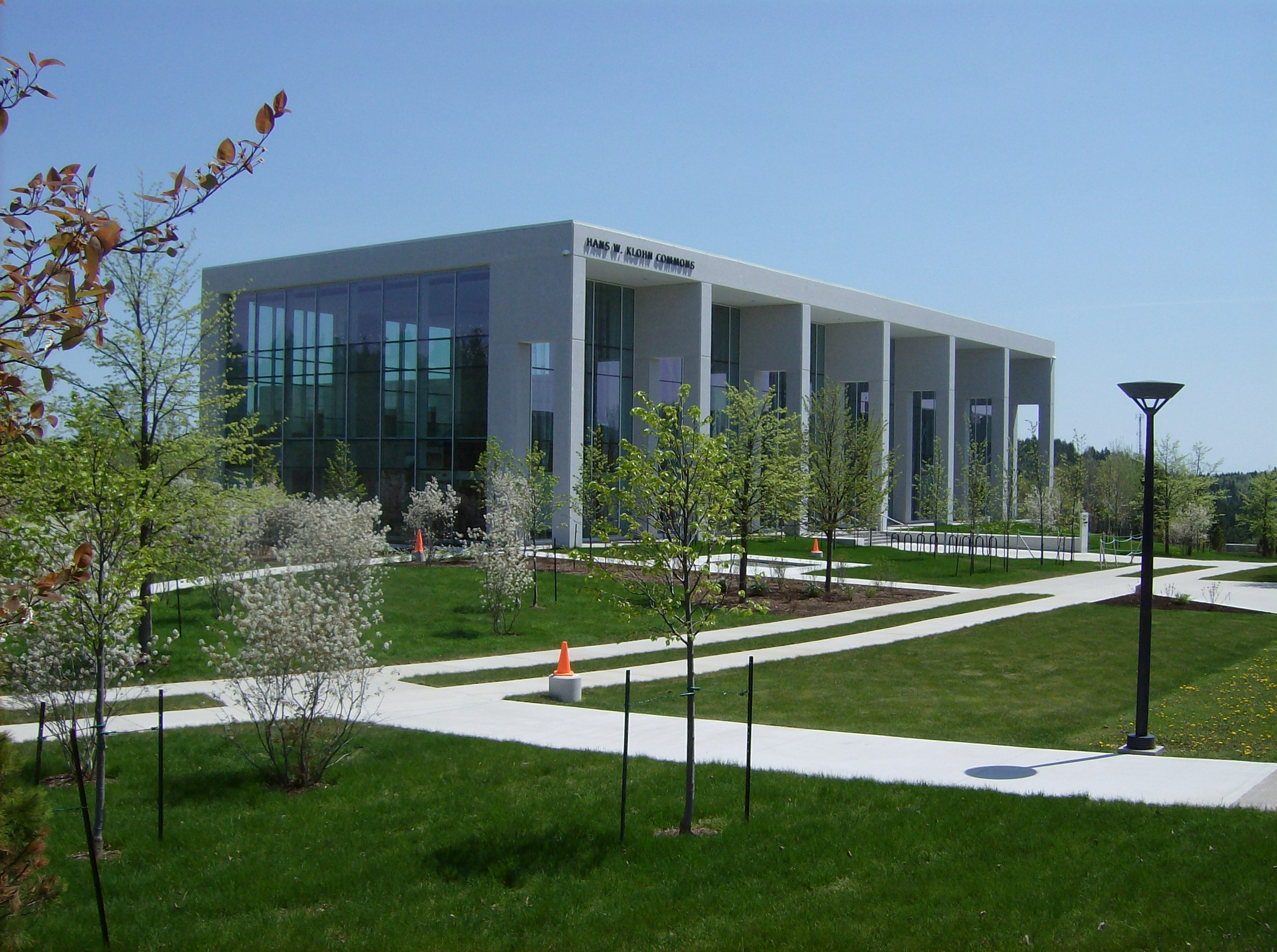
Hans W. Klohn Commons (Library), Saint John

UNB's presence in Saint John dates back to 1923 when the Saint John Law School, established in 1892, became part of UNB. In 1953, the law school moved to the Starr Residence, known today as Beaverbrook House, which is still operated by UNBSJ. Eventually, after nearly forty years of remaining in Saint John, it relocated to the main campus in Fredericton.

Starting in 1951, UNB offered summer extension courses in Saint John High School and St. Vincent's Convent, which proved to be successful. This highlighted the existing demand for higher education in Saint John, which had been recognized by the city's Board of Trade as early as 1947. In 1959, there was a growing interest in establishing a college in Saint John, and a group called "Saint John College Development Incorporated" began advocating for a postsecondary institution in the city. However, the proposal faced skepticism due to UNB's financial challenges and the perceived surplus of degree-granting institutions in New Brunswick.

During this discussion, the City of Saint John provided the site of a former 229-acre farm on Sandy Point Road. The location was deemed advantageous due to its views, services, and its position in a rapidly developing area of the city. In September 1964, Beaverbrook House reopened as a satellite campus of UNB, enrolling 100 students. Over time, UNB Saint John expanded its operations to various locations, including the Old Provincial Building, the New Brunswick Technology Institute, the Presbyterian Church Hall, the YMCA building, as well as various high schools. Faculty recruitment posed a challenge, with many commuting from Fredericton or hired from high schools.

Simultaneously, plans for a new campus on the Tucker Park site progressed, with UNB's consulting architects, Larson and Larson, tasked with preparing a concept plan. The initial construction cost was $1,350,000, which was part of a $10 million fundraising campaign led by UNB. In the same year, G. Forbes Elliot took the role as UNB Saint John's first principal. In 1965, the City of Saint John transferred ownership of 87 acres of land for the new campus. Construction on the Tucker Park campus began in 1966, and the site officially opened in 1969, featuring Hazen Hall, Ganong Hall, and the Ward Chipman Library.

The campus expanded over the next two decades, constructing the G. Forbes Elliot Athletics Centre in 1975, the Canada Games Stadium in 1985, and the Thomas J. Condon Student Centre in 1986. Despite these developments, UNBSJ was considered a commuter campus until 1993, following the construction of the Sir James Dunn Residence. Additional buildings were constructed over subsequent years, such as the K.C. Irving Hall, the Modern Languages Centre (now home to Dalhousie Medicine New Brunswick), the Dr. Colin B. Mackay Residence, and the Hans W. Klohn Commons.

==== Architecture ====
Construction on the Hans W. Klohn Commons began on April 1, 2010, and the building officially opened on September 7, 2011. This building is one of the most environmentally friendly buildings in Atlantic Canada. The building features an electric elevator that produces power for the commons. The building is part of the Tucker Park enhancement project, which includes the refurbishment of the Canada Games Stadium, the Dalhousie Medicine New Brunswick facility, and the New Brunswick Community College's Allied Health building. The Commons houses the library, Writing Centre, Math and Science Help Centre, an IT help desk, and the Commons Cafe.

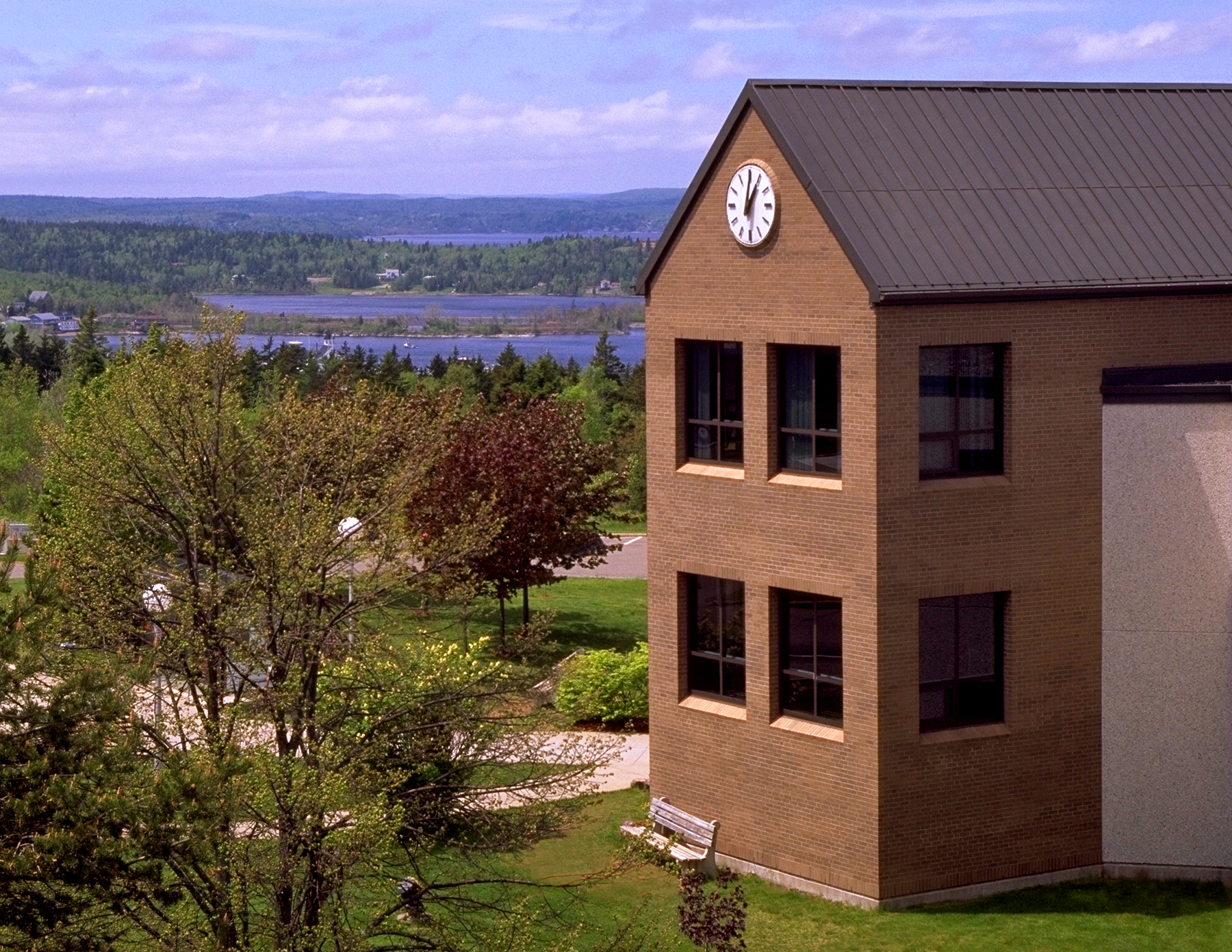
View from UNB Saint John campus

UNBSJ's third residence building, named the Barry and Flora Beckett Residence, opened in Winter 2021 and is a geothermally-heated building, offering 104 beds. The naming of the residence building honors the Becketts; two prominent figures in the campus' history. Dr. Barry Beckett was once a chemistry professor during UNB Saint John's earlier days as a campus in Uptown Saint John, while Flora Beckett taught mathematics and served as the director at the Math Help Centre. In light of the announcement regarding the Integrated Health Initiative (IHI), plans were made to reconstruct the Ward Chipman Library, which had been unused ever since being replaced by the Hans W. Klohn Commons, into the Health and Social Innovation Centre (HSIC). Although it was initially planned to be renovated, the former library was demolished in 2023 to be replaced by the HSIC.

== Research and academics ==
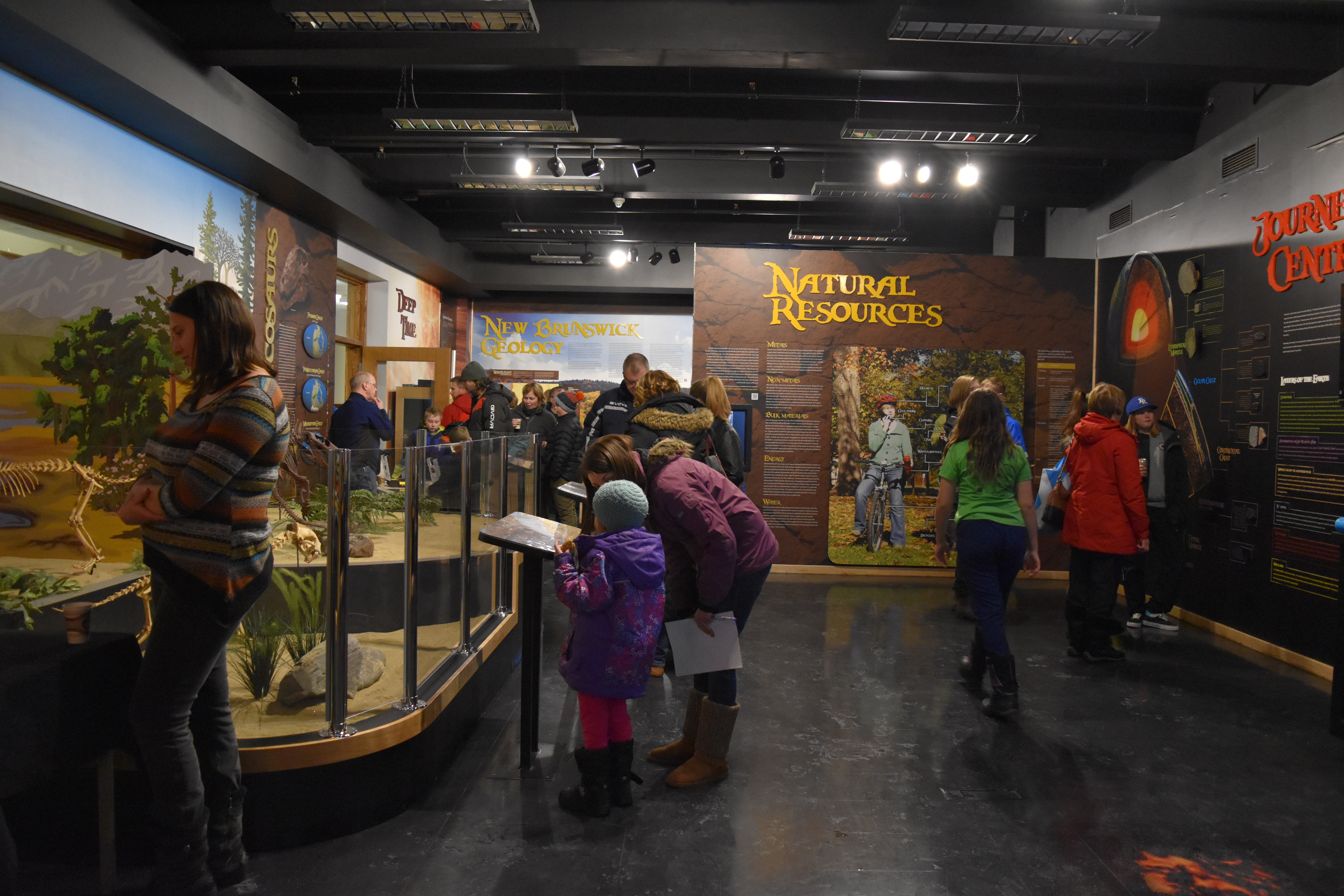
Quartermain Earth Science Museum, Geology building, Fredericton campus

UNB is the seat of 14 Canada Research Chairs and is home to more than 60 research centres and institutes. It conducts about 75 per cent of all university research in the province. UNB's annual research spending (2013–14) generated $32.2 million in added provincial income for the New Brunswick economy. Between 2004 and 2009, the university's research revenue increased by 77 per cent: the highest increase among Canadian comprehensive universities.

UNB has developed technology used by Google, is a research partner with the NASA Jet Propulsion Laboratory, is a global leader in powered prosthetic research and developing MRI technology, and is home to one of the motion analysis labs in North America as well as the world's first research centre in dermoskeletics.

=== Reputation ===
University rankings

World rankings
- QS World: =622
- THE World: 601–800
- THE Engineering: 251-300
- USNWR World: 948

Canadian rankings
- QS National: 21
- THE National: 20–27
- USNWR National: 26
- Maclean's Comprehensive: 8

In 2021, UNB was awarded 5 stars from the QS World University Rankings, the second university in Atlantic Canada to receive this rating.

In Maclean's 2023 "comprehensive university" rankings, UNB ranked eighth out of 15 universities, tied with Toronto Metropolitan University.

In 2014, UNB was awarded the most entrepreneurial university in Canada by Startup Canada. The university has also supported in launching 23 new startup companies as of 2015.

In 2012, UNB's law school was ranked second nationally in elite firm hiring by Maclean's. According to Canadian Lawyer Magazine, the law school ranks among the top five in Canada.

In 2008, the National Post and the Ottawa Citizen recognized UNB as being among the top three comprehensive research universities in Canada for the highest percentage growth of research income across a five-year period.

=== Faculty of Engineering ===
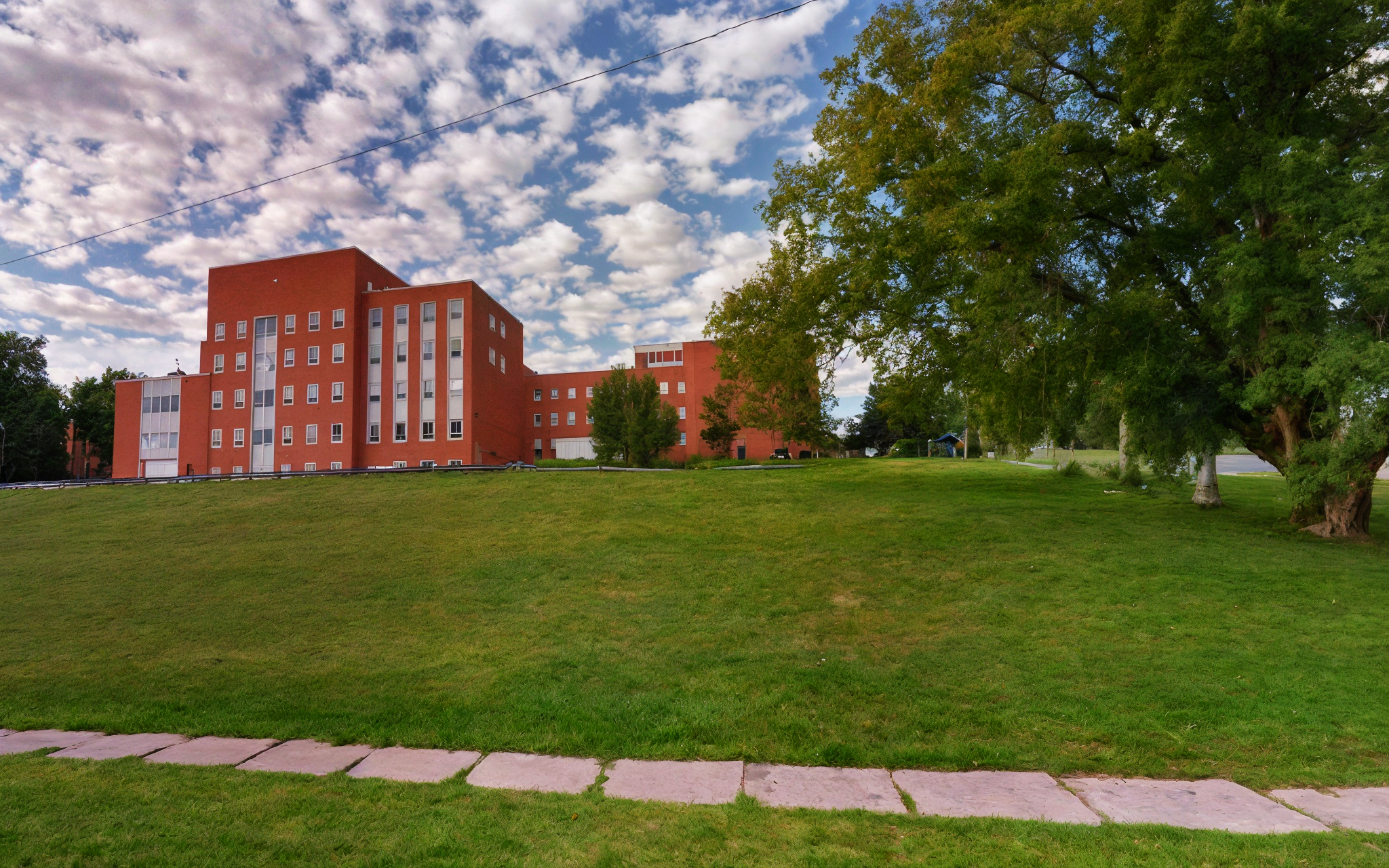
Sir Edmund Head Hall (Engineering Building), Fredericton campus

The University of New Brunswick is noted particularly for engineering, and its Faculty of Engineering, which opened in the late 1800s, was the first to offer engineering degrees in Canada. The Times Higher Education’s 2023 World University Rankings list by subject has placed UNB Engineering in the top 250 engineering programmes in the world. The faculty had 920 full-time equivalent students as of Winter 2021.

Engineering is one of the three major UNB faculties, with five departments offering seven accredited engineering programmes in Civil Engineering, Chemical Engineering, Electrical Engineering, Geodesy & Geomatics Engineering, Geological Engineering (jointly offered with the Faculty of Science), Mechanical Engineering, and Software Engineering (jointly offered with the Faculty of Computer Science).

UNB Engineering is known for its multi-faceted programs such as Geodesy and Geomatics. It is also known for its research hub, its satellite positioning technology, high-accuracy gravity field determination, and 3D high-resolution digital mapping systems. The Department's researchers assisted NASA map the Moon, designed technologies used by Google and USGS, developed satellite technology for precision mapping of polar regions and the Arctic Ocean, worked on national safety, and improved mathematics and physics methodology, such as spectral analysis.

=== Poets' Corner ===
Because so many of UNB's students, alumni, and professors have produced celebrated poetry, the city of Fredericton has earned the nickname "Poets' Corner." Two of Canada's four Confederation Poets – Sir Charles G.D. Roberts and Bliss Carman – were educated at UNB, as was Francis Joseph Sherman, along with a number of notable 20th- and 21st-century Canadian writers. In 1947, the Historic Sites and Monuments Board of Canada unveiled a "Poet's Corner" monument in honour of Carman, Roberts, and Sherman.

=== Institute of Biomedical Engineering ===
The Institute of Biomedical Engineering (IBME) on the Fredericton campus is one of the research institutes in biomedical engineering in Canada. It was founded in 1965 as the Bio-Engineering Institute, making it one of the oldest research institutes to be solely dedicated to the field of biomedical engineering. The institute is also the region's prosthetic fitting centre where amputees are fitted with "intelligent" artificial limbs. The institute also carries out research in the field of myoelectric signal processing, biomedical instrumentation and human motion analysis. The IBME also developed the UNB Test of Prosthetic Function which is used by researchers all over the world. Although the institute does not offer degrees in biomedical engineering, students at UNB usually enrol in one of the other faculties of engineering such as electrical or mechanical and pursue their research in biomedical engineering at the IBME.

=== Canadian Rivers Institute ===
Canadian Rivers Institute, Saint John

The Canadian Rivers Institute was founded in 2000 and is a site of river sciences research. The mandate of the CRI is to conduct both multi-disciplinary basic and applied research focusing on rivers from their headwaters to their estuaries, to promote the conservation, protection and sustainable use of water, and to educate professionals, graduate students and the public on water sciences. Members of the CRI conduct research on regional, national and international issues related to rivers and their land-water linkages.

With researchers from both UNB campuses, the CRI develops the aquatic science needed to understand, protect and sustain water resources. Since 2013, the CRI and its partners have been working with NB Power to research the potential environmental impacts of the future options being considered for the Mactaquac Generating Station. The Mactaquac Dam on the Saint John River will reach the end of its lifespan by 2030, and CRI has been evaluating key environmental challenges such as river health, fish passage and flow management. In 2015, CRI was given an additional $2.8 million from the Natural Sciences and Engineering Research Council (NSERC) to conduct an aquatic ecosystem study on the Saint John River.

In 2021, Parks Canada announced their first research chair in aquatic restoration, carrying out Atlantic salmon recovery research with researchers from the Canadian Rivers Institute.

=== Mi'kmaq-Wolastoqey Centre (MWC) ===
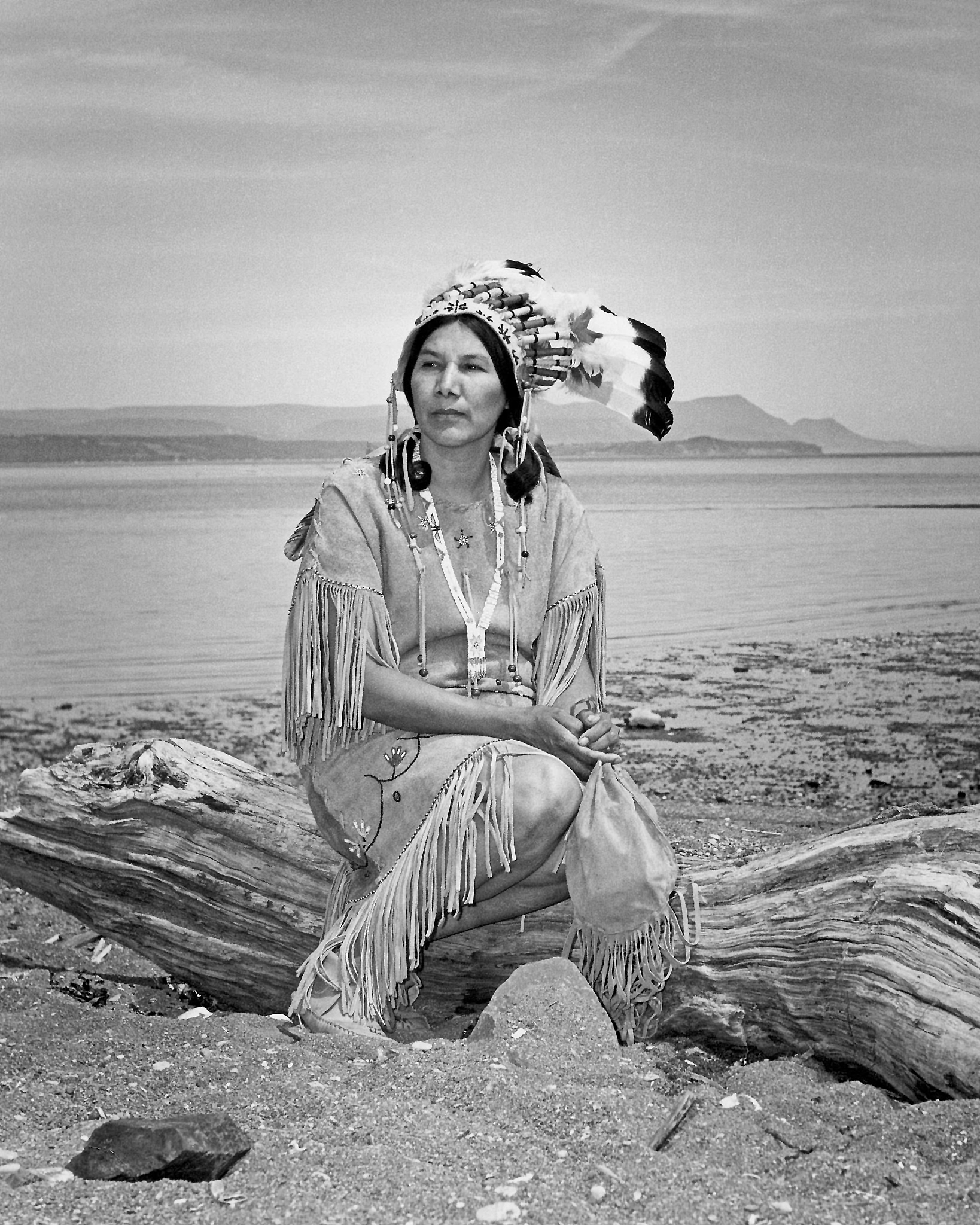
Margaret LaBillois CM ONB, the first female chief in New Brunswick.

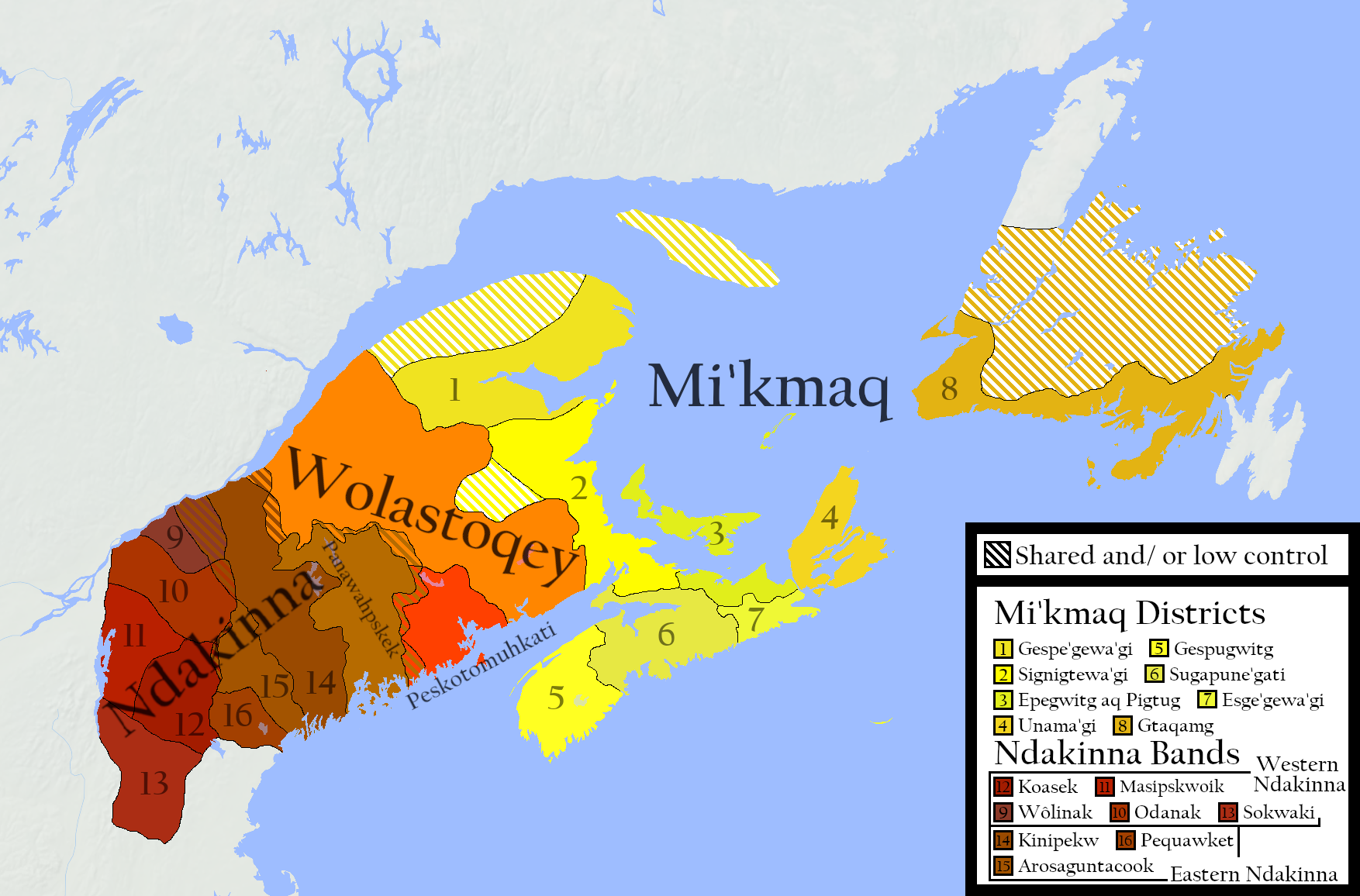
Wabanaki Confederacy.

UNB created its BEd programme for First Nations students in 1977 in an effort to help First Nations communities take control of their own schools. In 1981, the Mi'kmaq-Maliseet Institute (MMI), the former name of the Mi'kmaq-Wolastoqey Centre (MWC), opened its doors with an expanded mandate to train professionals and improve First Nations access to First Nations education.

The Institute provided a variety of services, including research, curriculum development, language education, policy development, children's literacy, and more. In addition, the Institute funded the Mi'kmaq-Maliseet Resource Collection, which contains materials that are immensely valuable to knowledge of First Nations culture, history, and perspective in the region.

Many notable First Nations members have converged with this UNB effort. Victoria LaBillois (UNB BA, MBA), a distinguished Mi’gmaq entrepreneur and national Indigenous leader, among others, reflects the ongoing impact of Indigenous leadership in New Brunswick — a legacy also embodied by figures such as Margaret (Peggy) Pictou LaBillois, CM ONB, WWII veteran and the first female Mi’kmaq chief in the province.

=== Canadian Research Institute for Social Policy ===
The Canadian Research Institute for Social Policy was founded in 1996 as the Atlantic Centre for Policy Research, supported by the Canadian Institute For Advanced Research. The name change took effect in January 2000. The institute was designated as a Statistics Canada Research Data Centre in 2002. The institute brings interdisciplinary researchers together to focus on issues pertaining to social policy on a national and international level, specifically issues relevant to children and youth development. Projects included the New Brunswick Schools Early Literacy Initiative; Mapping Literacy as a Determinant of Health; Raising and Leveling the Bar: A Collaborative Research Initiative on Children's Learning, Behavioural, and Health Outcomes; and the Confident Learners Initiative.

=== Medical Training Centre ===
The University of New Brunswick's Medical Training Centre is the first anglophone school of medicine in New Brunswick. It is a joint medical programme, offered with Dalhousie University Faculty of Medicine.

==== Polytechnic controversy ====
In the fall of 2007, a report commissioned by the provincial government recommended that UNBSJ and the New Brunswick Community College be reformed and consolidated into a new polytechnic post-secondary institute. The proposal immediately came under heavy criticism and led to several organized protests. Under heavy fire from the public, the Graham government eventually announced that it would set aside the possibility of UNB Saint John losing its status as a university and would refer the report to a working group for further study. The government would go on to announce in January that UNBSJ would retain its liberal arts programme and its association with UNB and the working group reported back to government in May, with its findings and government's response being made public in June.

==== The Strax affair ====
In March 1969, UNB was censured by the Canadian Association of University Teachers (CAUT) because of its suspension of Norman Strax, a physics professor who had led protests in September 1968 against the introduction of photo id cards. The censure was lifted after the university agreed to engage in arbitration with Strax. Among the "tumultuous events" of the 1968–69 academic year were the occupation by Strax's supporters of his office in Loring Bailey Hall and the prosecution and jailing of a student journalist over an article in the Brunswickan.

== Scholarships ==
UNB awards over five million dollars in scholarships each year. These include the Blake-Kirkpatrick, Beaverbrook, and President's scholarships. With $7.2 million available in undergraduate scholarships, one in two students entering UNB from high school received a scholarship as of 2015. UNB has a scholarship guarantee in which any admitted student with an average of 80% or higher will receive a guaranteed amount of five hundred dollars.

As a member of the Loran Scholars university consortium, UNB offers a matching tuition waiver as part of a $100,000 undergraduate scholarship to recognize incoming students who demonstrate "exemplary character, service and leadership". Five Loran Scholars have studied at UNB over the years. Additionally, it is part of the Schulich Leader Scholarships programme, awarding an $100,000 STEM scholarship to an incoming engineering student and an $80,000 scholarship to a science, technology, or mathematics student each year.

== Student life ==
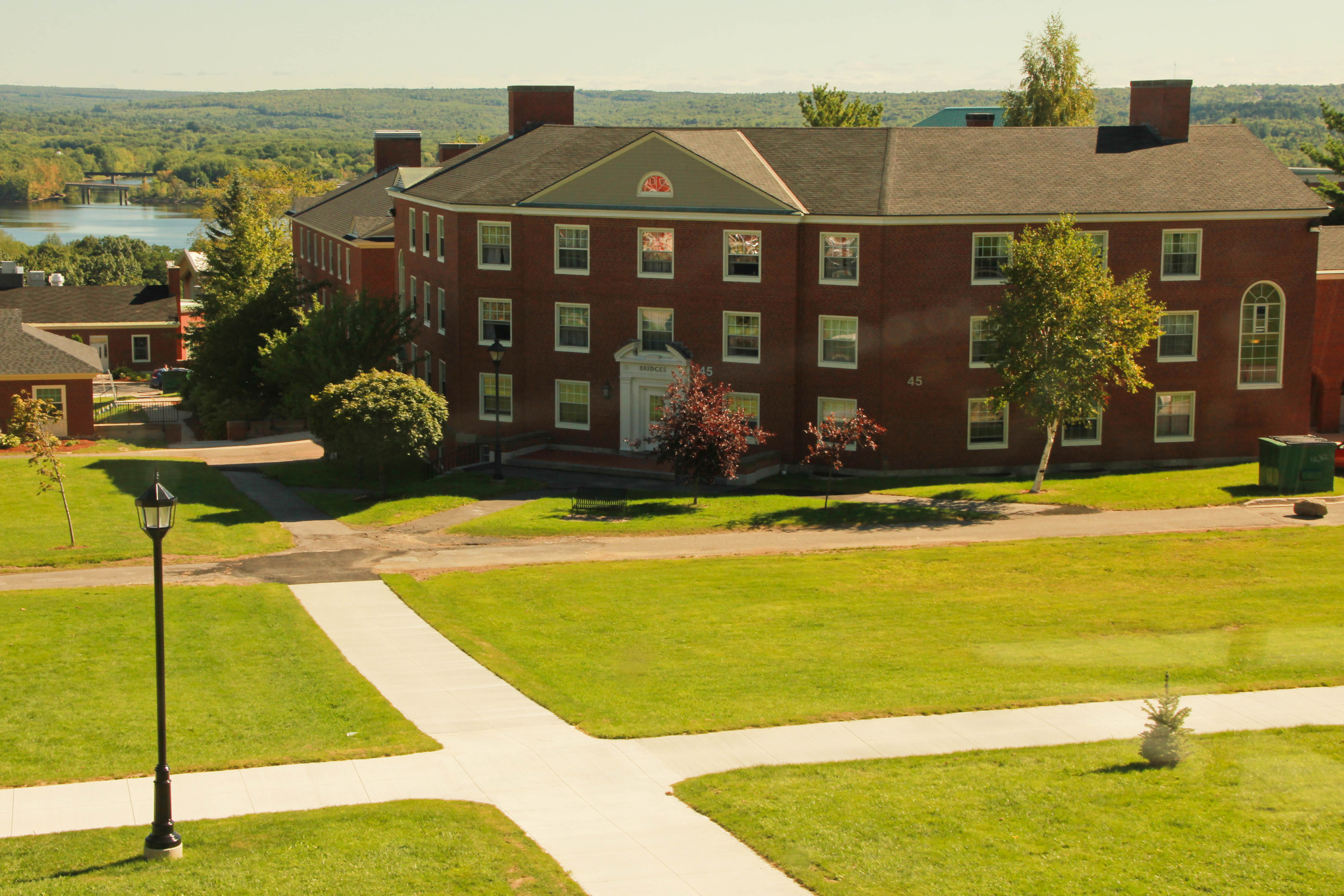
Bridges House, Fredericton campus

UNB has over 10,000 students from more than 100 countries. The University has a total of 16 residences: 13 in the Fredericton campus, and three in the Saint John campus. Students have over 125 clubs and societies to choose from between both of these campuses.

Students on both campuses have access to UNB's facilities, fitness classes and outdoor activities such as snowshoeing and kayaking. There are exchanges available in more than 35 countries around the world with over 89 university partners.

=== Organizations ===
The University of New Brunswick Student Union (UNBSU) is the students' union for the Fredericton campus. The Saint John campus operates its own students' union through the Students' Representative Council (SRC), which also represents students at Dalhousie Medicine New Brunswick.

=== Athletics ===
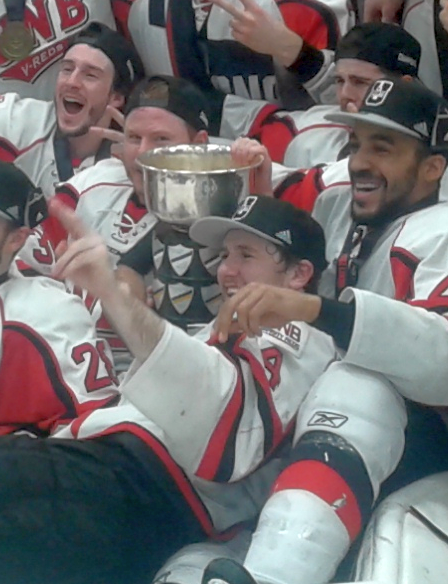
UNB won the 2017 National University Cup

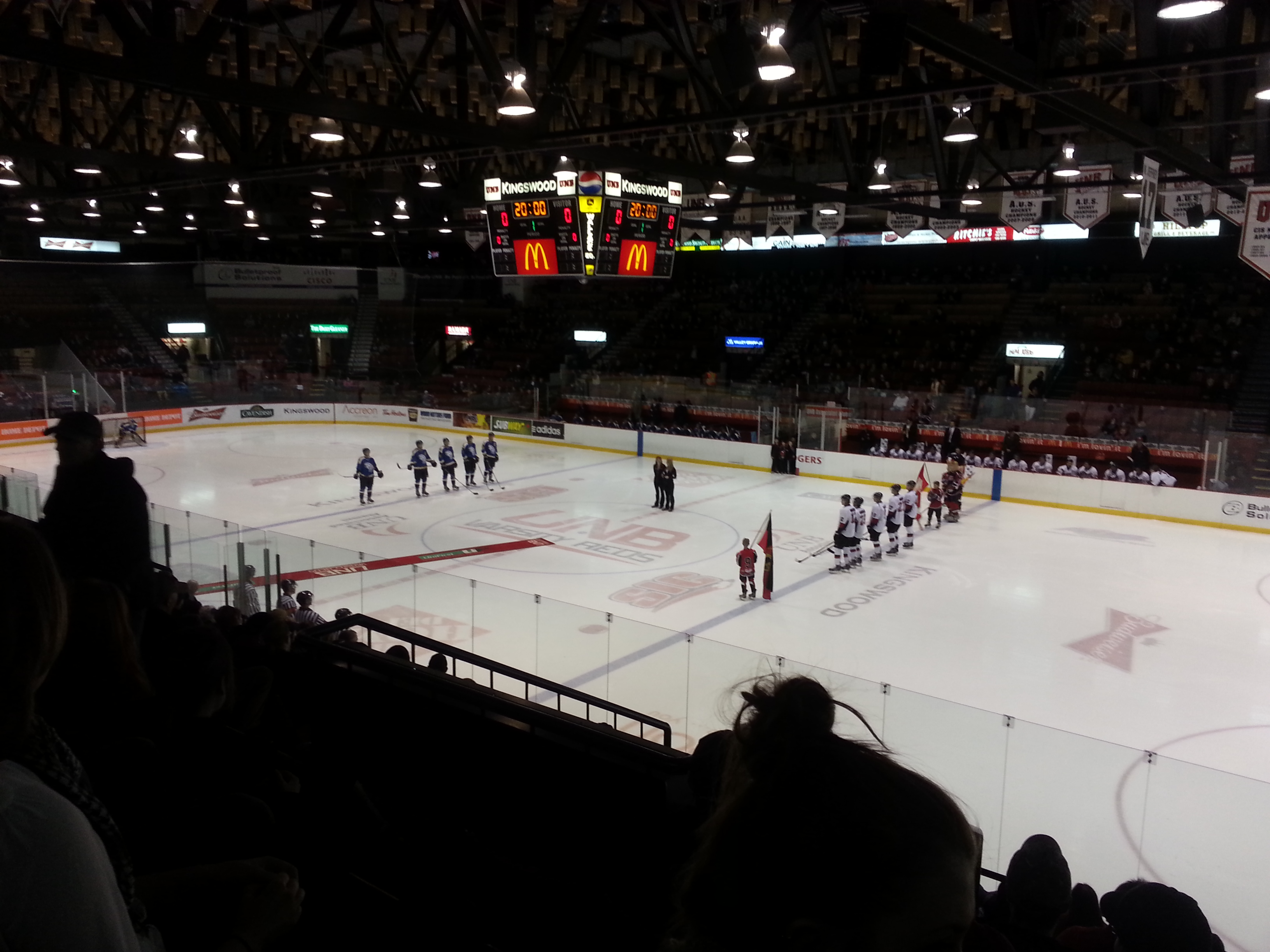
Aitken University Centre arena, Fredericton campus

The University of New Brunswick has two sports teams, one for each campus. UNB Fredericton's team is called the UNB Reds, and UNB Saint John's team is called the UNB Saint John Seawolves. The Reds varsity teams primarily participate in Atlantic University Sport (AUS) and U Sports. The Saint John Seawolves varsity teams primarily participate in the Atlantic Collegiate Athletic Association (ACAA) and the Canadian Collegiate Athletic Association. There are teams for cross country, curling, basketball, hockey, soccer, swimming, track and field, and volleyball. Out of these sports, there are additional teams for the Saint John Seawolves for basketball, soccer, and volleyball. Men's and women's track & field and cross country were added as a varsity sport for 2010–2011; this is a joint Fredericton/Saint John Campus programme.

In the past, UNBF used different names for each individual sport's team; for instance, the men's swim team was the Beavers, and the hockey team was the Red Devils. The university club teams, which are supported financially by the Student Union as well as by individual members of the teams, do not use the Reds name and thus continue the tradition of using different nicknames for each sport.

== Insignia and other representations ==
=== Coat of arms ===
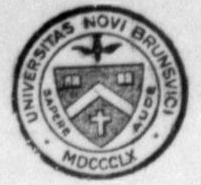
The University of New Brunswick crest, as seen from a 1927 newspaper

The University of New Brunswick's official coat of arms was introduced in 1956 after being approved by the University of New Brunswick Senate. Previously, UNB's only insignia was the Great Seal, which the New Brunswick Legislative Assembly granted during the Act of the University of New Brunswick in 1859. In 1952, a subcommittee of the UNB Senate was tasked with considering designs and suggestions.

The coat of arms features two gold beavers in front of a crimson background, on either side of the Book of Learning, which features the University's motto Sapere Aude. The bottom part of the shield contains a ship in front of a gold background, adapted from the New Brunswick coat of arms. This recognizes UNB's status as a provincial university.

The design was described by a proclamation from the College of Heralds as follows:

"Per chevron Gules and Or in chief and open Book proper inscribed with the words Sapere Aude in letters Sable supported by two Beavers sejant respectant Gold and in base a Lymphad said set pennon and flags flying and Oars in action also Sable."

=== Songs ===
Traditional among a number of songs commonly played and sung at various times such as commencement, convocation, and athletic events are "Carmina Universitatis Novi Brunsvici", "Alma Mater" (1904), and "UNB Anthem", with words by A.G. Bailey and music by D.V. Start.

== Notable academic milestones ==
UNB Saint John was the first university in Canada to offer an e-business programme with its bachelor of business administration in electronic commerce. The university has since been ranked by Canadian Business Magazine as first in e-business.

== People ==
=== List of presidents ===
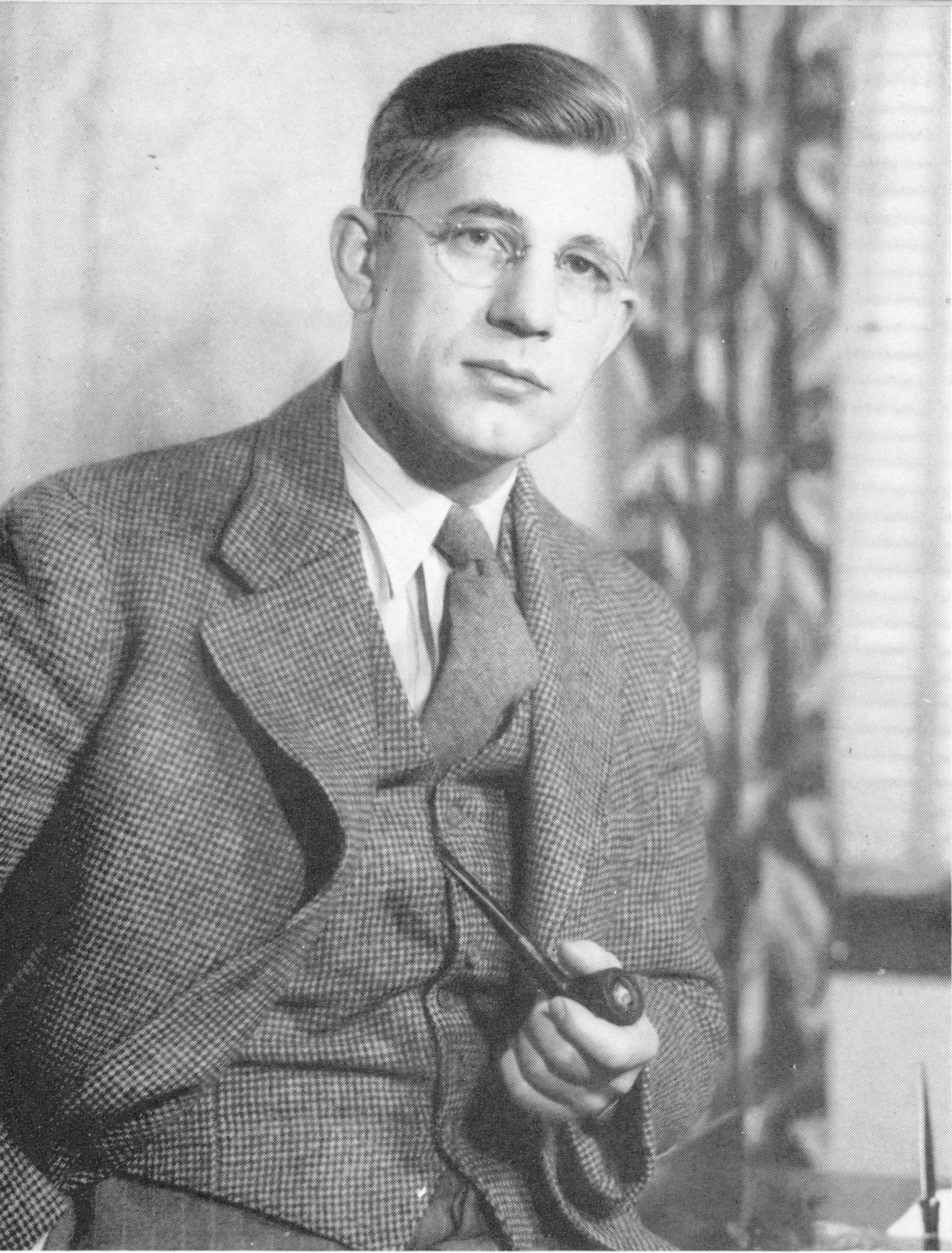
Albert William Trueman (1948–1953)

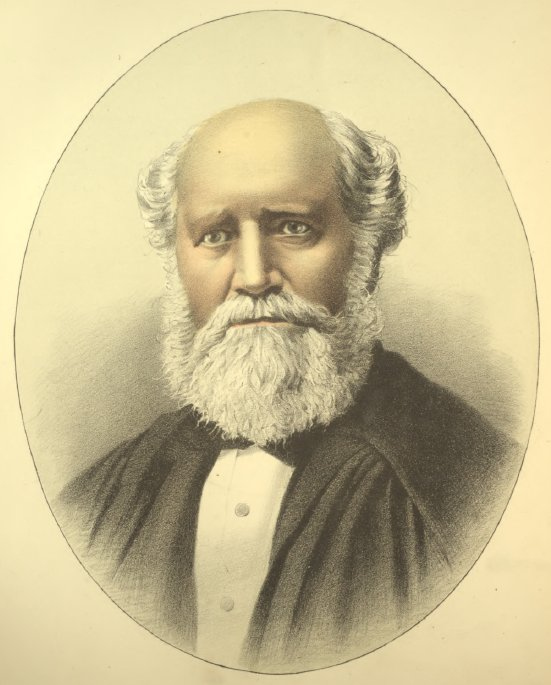
William Brydone Jack (1861–1885)

- Kathy Wilson (2026) (Acting)
- Paul Mazerolle (2019–2026)
- Eddy Campbell (2009–2019)
- John McLaughlin (2002–2009)
- Elizabeth Parr-Johnston (1996–2002)
- Robin L. Armstrong (1990–1996)
- James Downey (1980–1990)
- John M. Anderson (1973–1980)
- Desmond Pacey (1972)
- James Owen Dineen (1969–1972)
- Colin Bridges Mackay (1953–1969)
- Albert William Trueman (1948–1953)
- Milton Fowler Gregg (1944–1947)
- Norman Archibald Macrae MacKenzie (1940–1944)
- Cecil Charles Jones (1906–1940)
- Thomas Harrison (1885–1906)
- William Brydone Jack (1861–1885)
- Joseph R. Hea (1860–1861)
- Edwin Jacob (1829–1860)
- James Somerville (1811–1828)

=== Notable current and former faculty ===
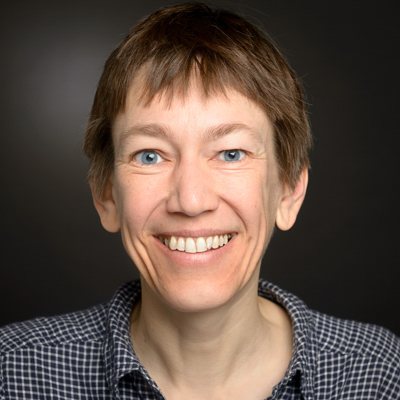
Jacqui Cole – enhanced efficiency of solar cells

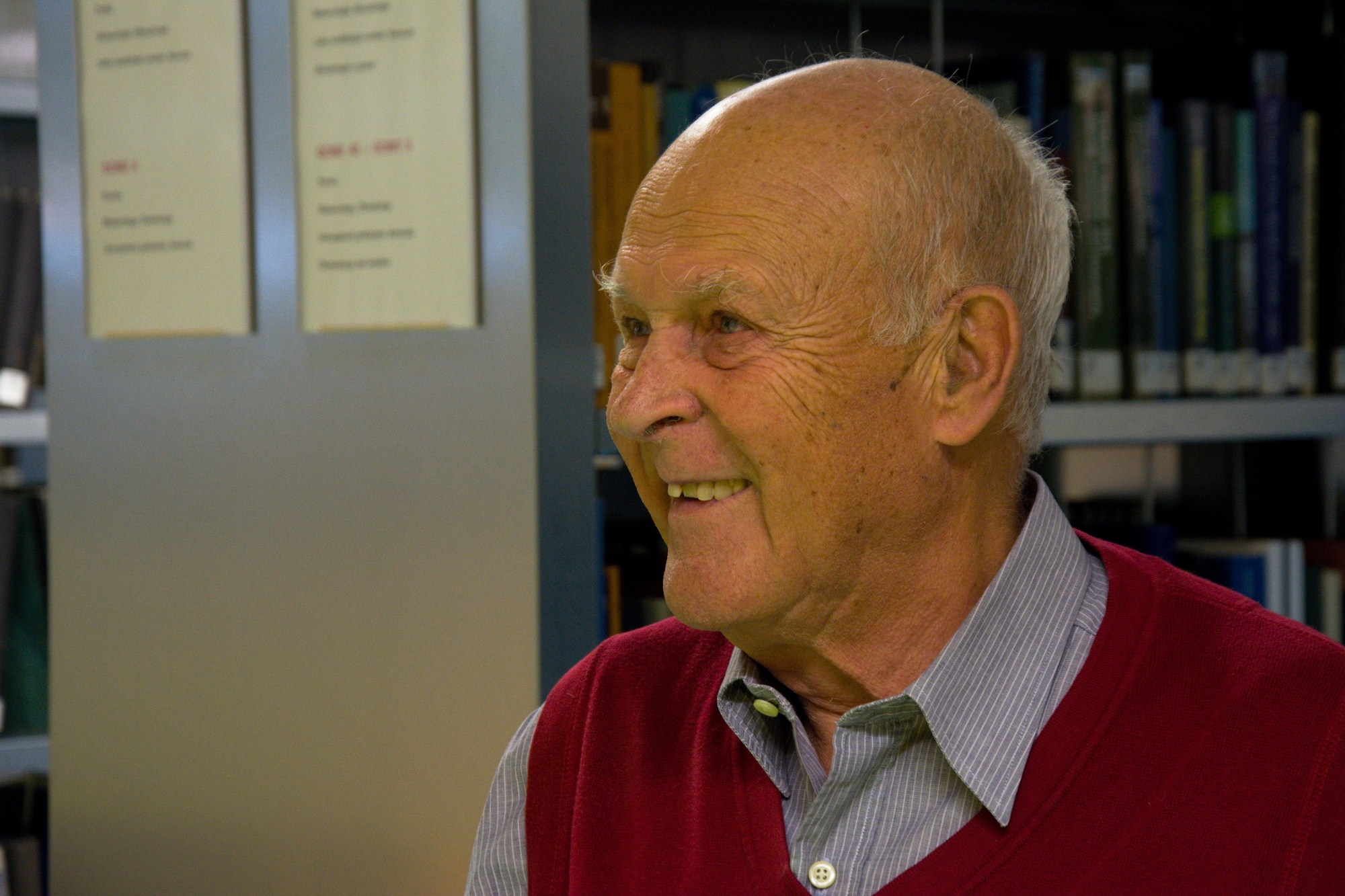
Petr Vaníček – improved spectral analysis

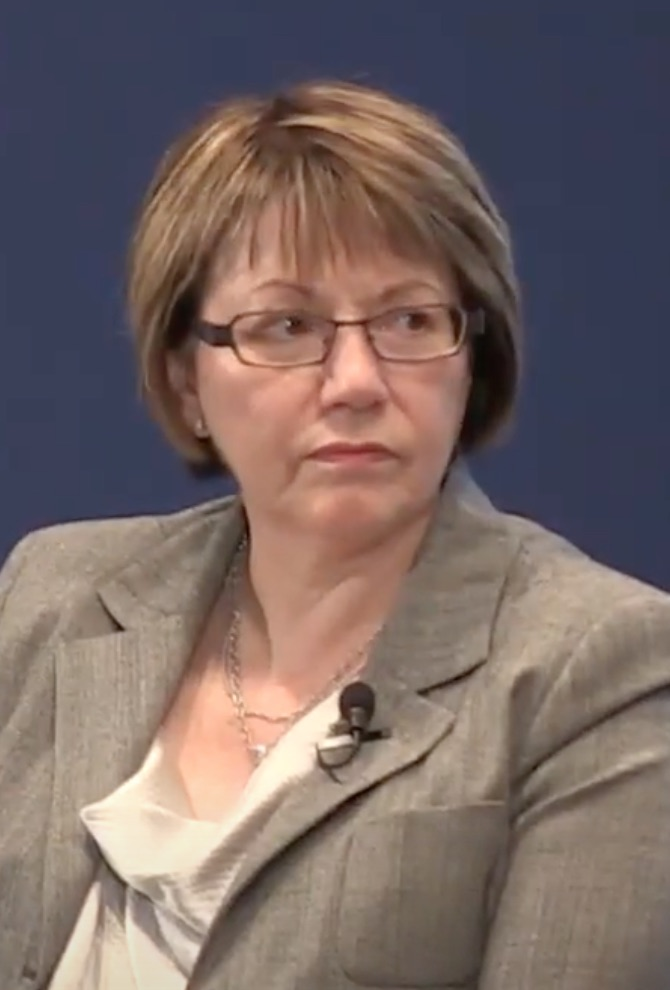
Anne McLellan – fmr. Deputy Prime Minister of Canada

- Xiaoyi Bao – Physicist, recognized for her contributions to the field of fiber optics
- Bill Bauer – Poet and short-story writer, critically acclaimed for his "strikingly inventive imagination"
- Philip Bryden – Current deputy minister of justice and deputy solicitor general of Alberta
- E. Sandra Byers – academic psychologist and sexologist
- Silver Donald Cameron – Journalist, author, and playwright whose writing focused on social justice, nature, and the environment
- Eddy Campbell – Mathematician and former University president (2009–2019)
- Jacqui Cole – Head of the Molecular Engineering group in the Cavendish Laboratory at the University of Cambridge
- Ann Gorman Condon – Historian
- Baron d'Avray – New Brunswick superintendent of education (1854–1858)
- Herb Emery – Economist
- George Eulas Foster – Seven-times minister in the Government of Canada, and longtime member and senator in the Parliament of Canada
- Karen Kidd – Aquatic ecotoxicologist and member of the International Joint Commission
- Gérard La Forest – Former puisne justice of the Supreme Court of Canada
- David Lametti – Current minister of justice and attorney general of Canada
- Nicole Letourneau – Child health scholar. Named to Canada's "Top 40 Under 40" people by the Globe and Mail (2008)
- Anne McLellan – Former deputy prime minister of Canada
- John Valk – Professor of philosophy
- Petr Vaníček – Geophysicist and geodesist. Instigator and president of the Canadian Geophysical Union (1986–1988)
- Pete Kelly – Former NHL player, University of New Brunswick athletics director (1913–2004)
- Melanie Wiber – Anthropologist

=== Notable alumni ===
As of 2023, the University of New Brunswick reports over 95,000 living alumni, with 41,715 in New Brunswick.

- D. Craig Aitchison – Canadian military general
- Jenica Atwin – Member of the Canadian Parliament, researcher, and educator
- Alfred Bailey – educator, poet, anthropologist, ethnohistorian
- David Bashow, fighter pilot, professor, and military historian
- Francesco Bellini – scientist, entrepreneur, and co-founder of BioChem Pharma
- George Best – first president of University of King's College
- Elizabeth Brewster – poet and academic
- Rod Bryden – business executive
- Bliss Carman – 19th-century Canadian poet
- J. Howard Crocker – Canadian educator for the YMCA and University of Western Ontario, and sports executive with the Amateur Athletic Union of Canada and the Canadian Olympic Committee
- Oswald Smith Crocket – Puisne Justice of the Supreme Court of Canada
- Richard Currie – business executive, Chancellor Emeritus of UNB
- Joseph Z. Daigle – politician, jurist and Chief Justice of New Brunswick
- Kwame Dawes – artist and academic
- Julie Dickson – civil servant
- Michael O'Brien - Mayor of Fredericton, 2016 to 2021
- Darrell Duffie – economist and Dean Witter Distinguished Professor of Finance at Stanford Graduate School of Business
- Fredrik Stefan Eaton – former business executive, High Commissioner to the United Kingdom, and member of the Eaton family (Toronto)
- Sir George Eulas Foster – politician, academic, and Minister of Finance
- Mabel French – the first woman in New Brunswick to be awarded a Bachelor of Civil Law degree and the first woman to practice law in two separate Canadian provinces, New Brunswick and British Columbia
- David A. Ganong – President of Ganong Bros. Limited
- William Francis Ganong – botanist, historian, cartographer
- Shawn Graham – former Premier of New Brunswick
- Sir John Douglas Hazen – politician and jurist, former Premier of New Brunswick and Chief Justice of New Brunswick
- Loyola Hearn – former politician and Ambassador to Ireland
- Blaine Higgs – former politician and premier of New Brunswick
- Alan R. Hildebrand – planetary scientist, discovered significance of Chicxulub crater
- Sam Hinds – former Prime Minister of Guyana
- Norman Inkster – former Commissioner of the RCMP & former President of INTERPOL
- Sam Johnston – New Brunswick MLA
- Henry Ketchum – railway engineer, UNB's first graduate in engineering
- Gérard La Forest – former Puisne Justice of the Supreme Court of Canada
- Kelly Lamrock – former politician, cabinet minister and Attorney General of New Brunswick
- Walter Learning – theatre director and founder of Theatre New Brunswick
- Alaina Lockhart – Member of Parliament
- Nicole Lundrigan – writer
- Elizabeth Roberts MacDonald – writer, suffragist
- Wade MacLauchlan – Premier of Prince Edward Island
- Alistair MacLeod – author
- Doug Mastriano – U.S. politician and retired military officer
- Allison McCain – business executive, philanthropist, Chairman of the Board of McCain Foods Limited and former Chancellor of UNB
- Frank McKenna – former Premier of New Brunswick, Ambassador to the United States, and banker
- John B. McNair – former Premier of New Brunswick, Chief Justice of New Brunswick, and Lieutenant Governor of New Brunswick
- Gerald Merrithew – educator, politician
- Gerard Mitchell – jurist and former Chief Justice of Prince Edward Island
- James Mitchell – Premier of New Brunswick
- Shawn Murphy – lawyer and politician
- Anne Murray – Grammy Award-winning singer
- Graydon Nicholas – jurist and first aboriginal Lieutenant Governor of New Brunswick, first aboriginal man in Atlantic Canada to earn a law degree
- Robert Nielsen – journalist
- Penny Park – science journalist
- Tony Proudfoot – all-star CFL (Montreal Alouettes and BC Lions) player
- William Pugsley – politician, Premier of New Brunswick, and Lieutenant Governor of New Brunswick
- Lalith J. Rao – Indian classical singer and a representative of the Agra gharana
- Charles D. Richards – former Premier of New Brunswick, Chief Justice of New Brunswick
- Sir Charles G. D. Roberts – 19th-century Canadian poet and author
- Andy Scott – politician
- Lesley Shannon – professor
- Dr. Chris Simpson – physician, 147th President of the Canadian Medical Association
- Scott Smith – President of Hockey Canada
- Leonard Percy de Wolfe Tilley – politician and former Premier of New Brunswick
- Clark Todd – journalist, killed on assignment in Lebanon
- R. M. Vaughan – Canadian poet, novelist and playwright
- Edward Ludlow Wetmore – politician, jurist and Chief Justice of Saskatchewan
- Mary Matilda Winslow – the University of New Brunswick's first black female graduate
- Doug Young – lawyer and politician, former Minister of National Defence, and Leader of the Liberal Party of New Brunswick
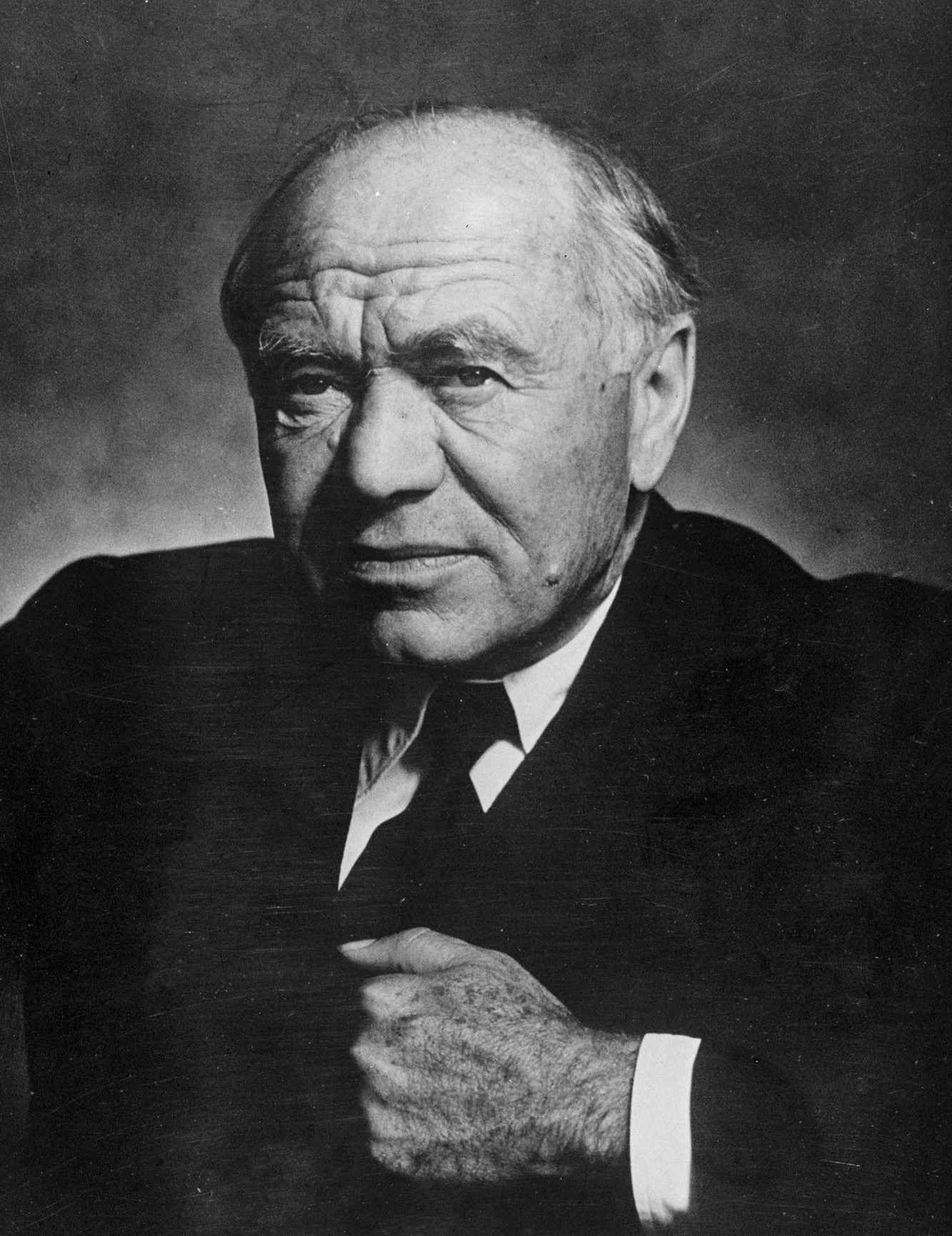
Lord Beaverbrook, Anglo-Canadian press baron & member of the British War Cabinet

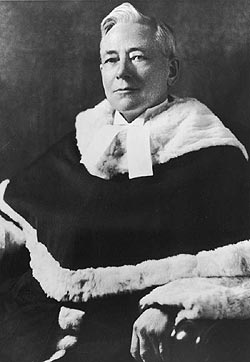
Oswald Smith Crocket, Puisne Justice of the Supreme Court of Canada

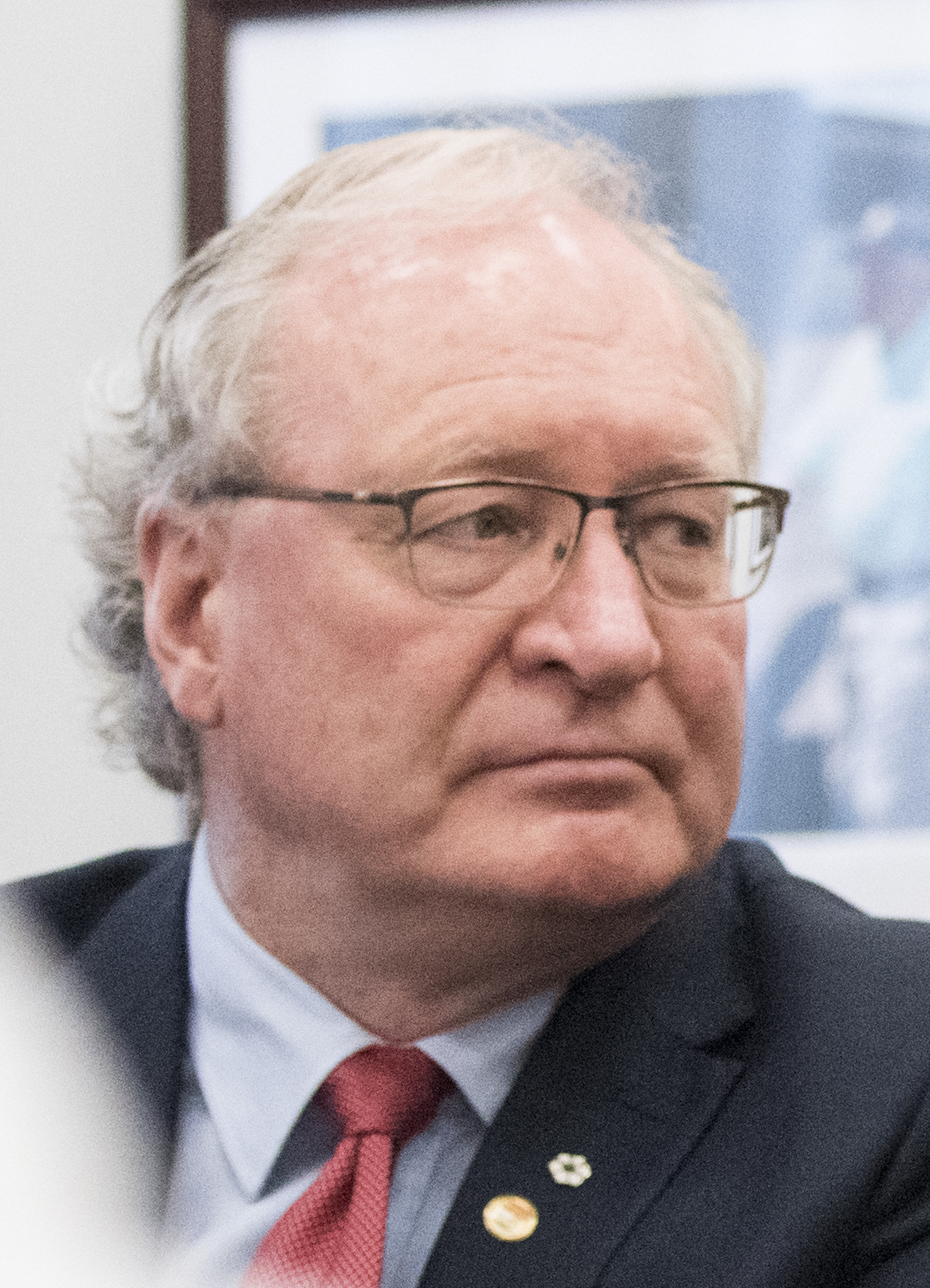
Wade MacLauchlan, former Premier of Prince Edward Island

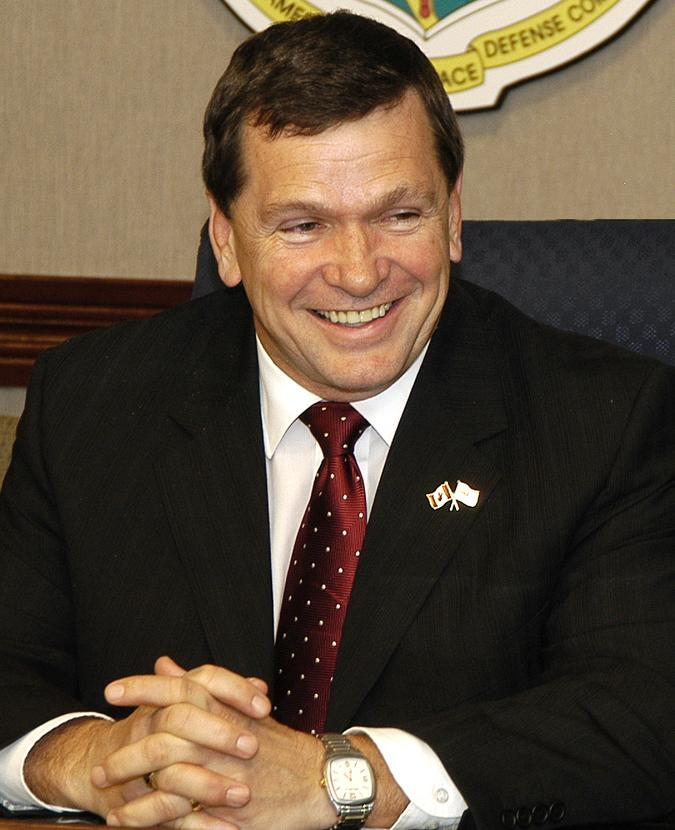
Frank McKenna, former Ambassador & Premier of New Brunswick

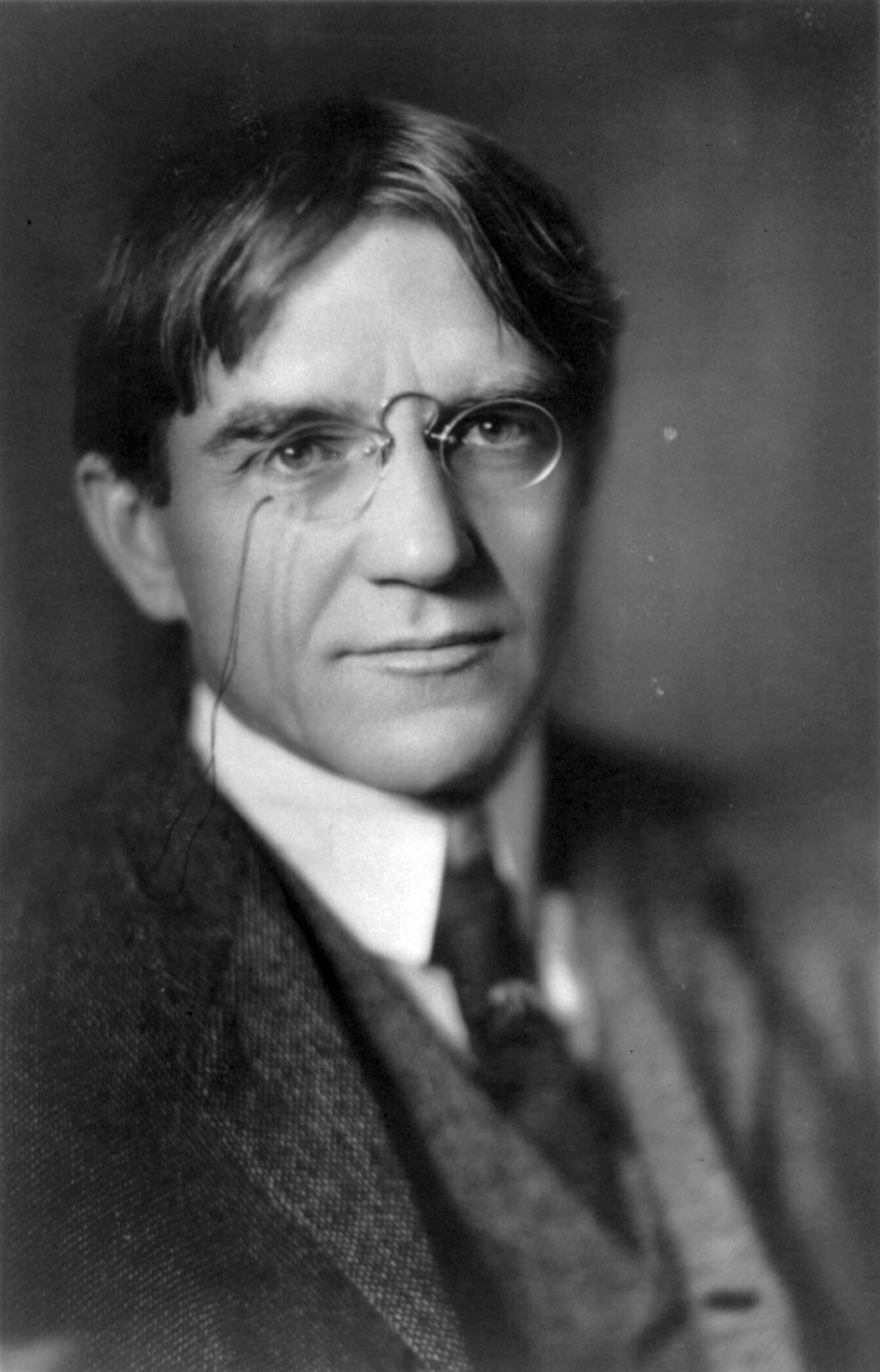
Sir Charles G.D. Roberts, author

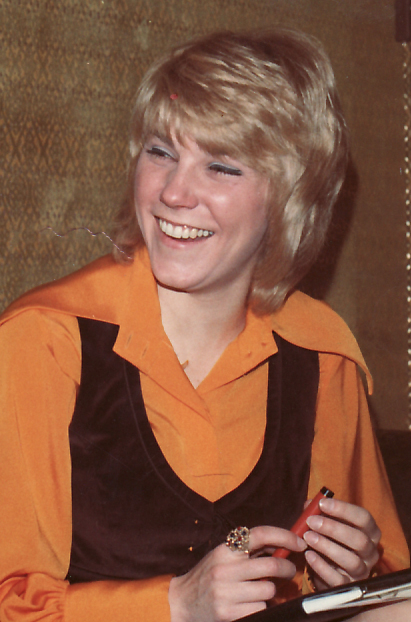
Anne Murray, four-time Grammy Award winner

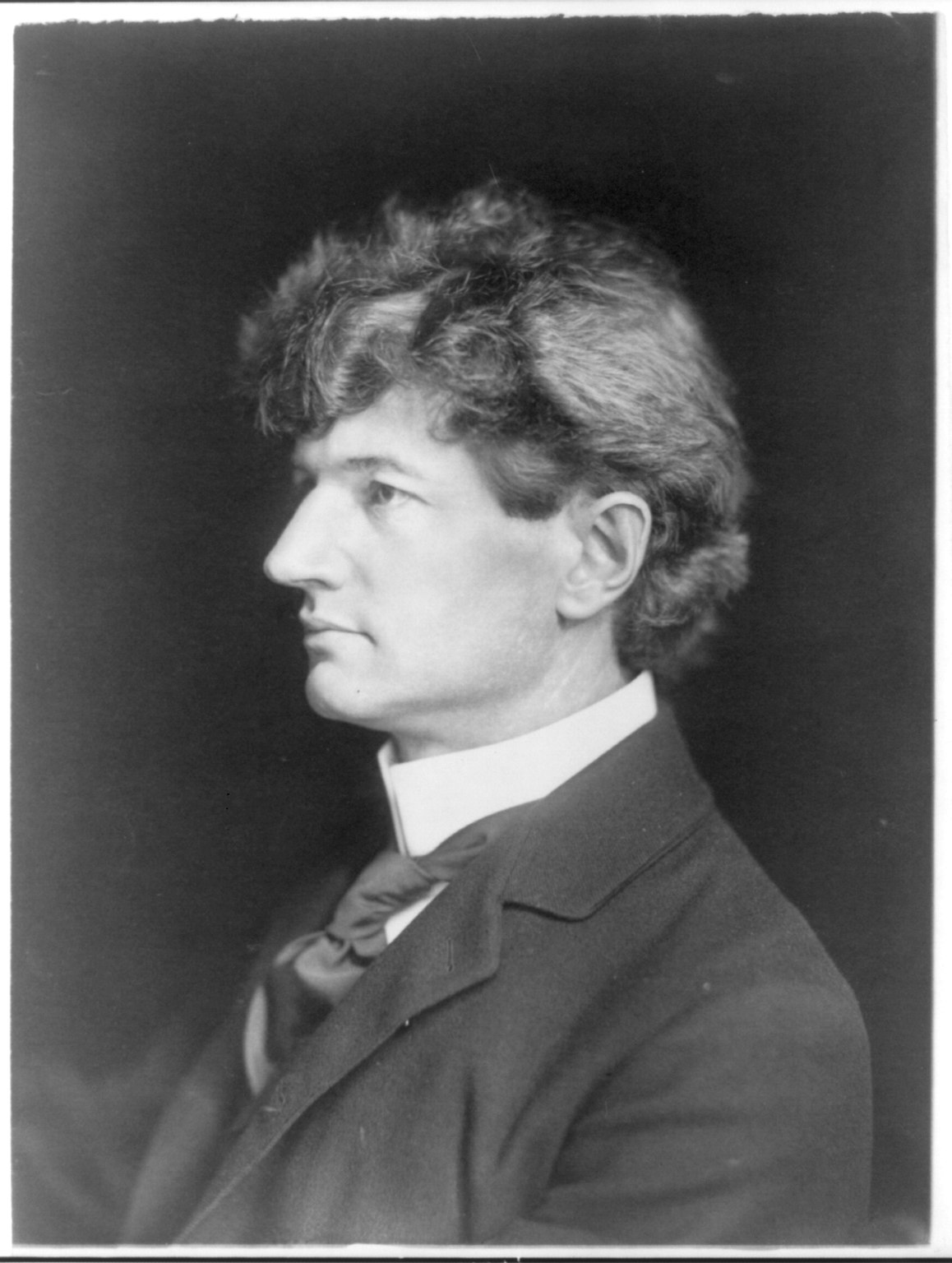
Bliss Carman, Canada's poet laureate

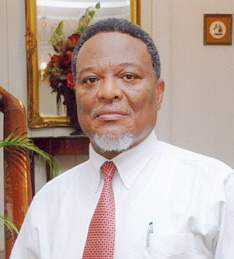
Sam Hinds, Prime Minister of Guyana (1992-2015)

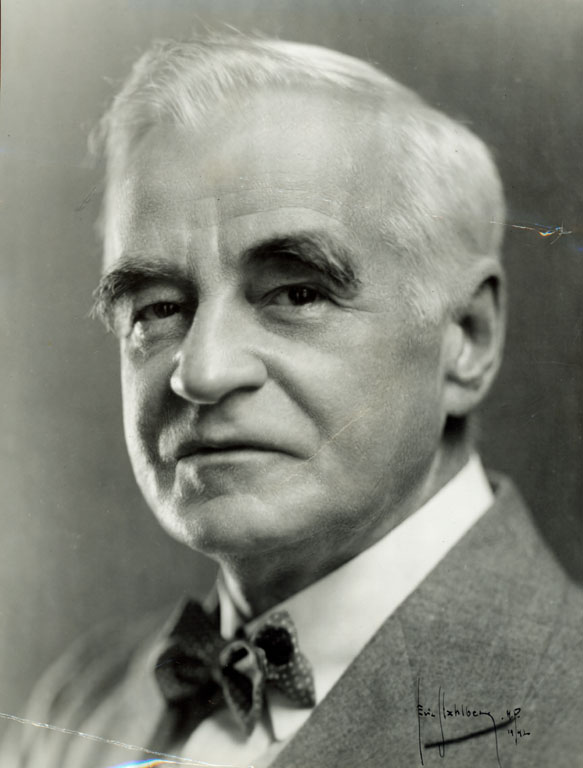
William Francis Ganong, Canadian botanist and historian

== Media ==
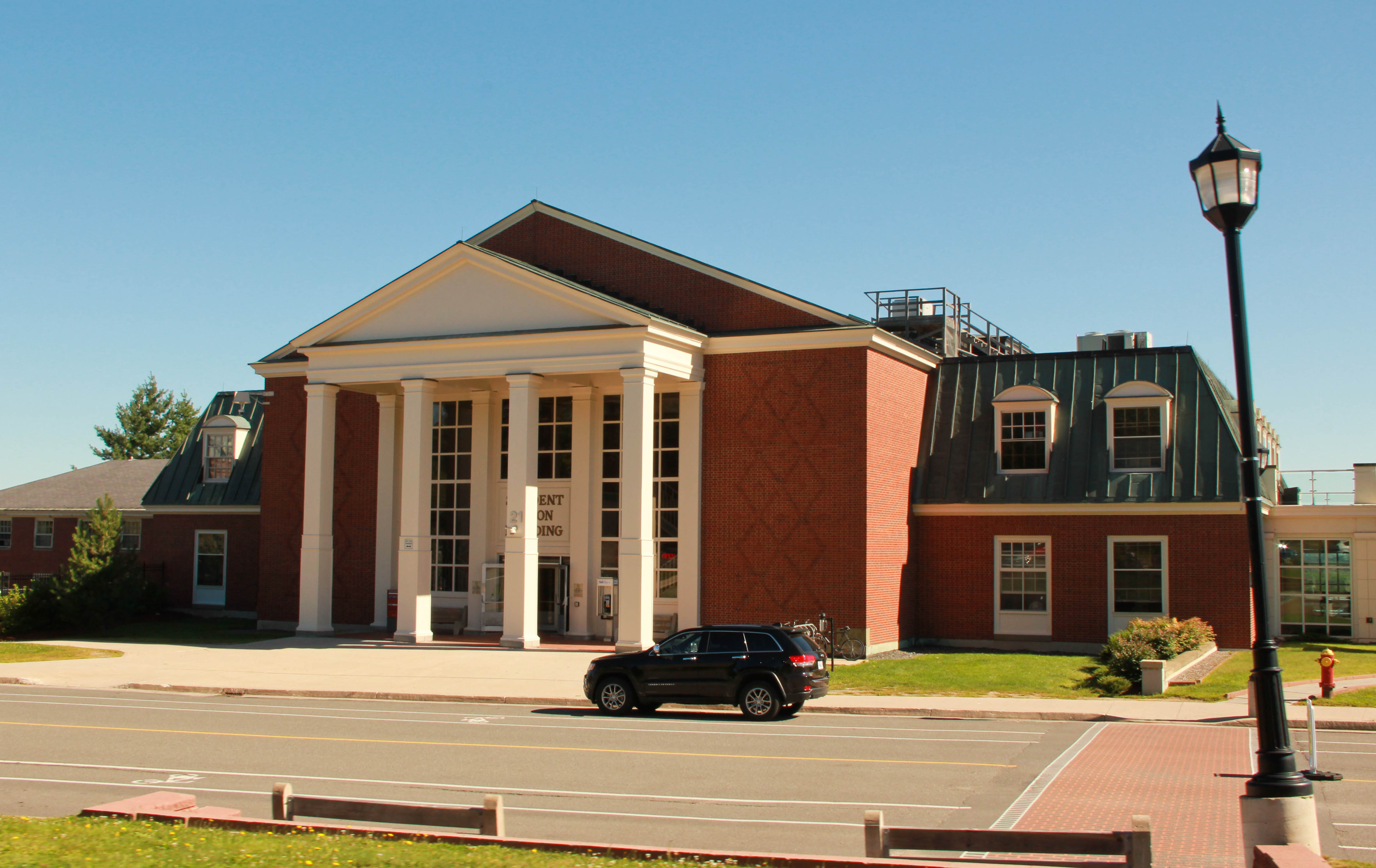
The Student Union Building, home to The Brunswickan and other university media

The university presses, The Baron and The Brunswickan, are members of Canadian University Press. Publishing since 1867, The Brunswickan is the oldest official student publication in Canada.

UNB is also home to several notable magazines and journals, such as The Fiddlehead and Studies in Canadian Literature.

=== Radio ===
- 107.3FM CFMH-FM (Saint John)
- 97.9FM CHSR-FM (Fredericton)

=== Newspapers ===
- The Baron (Saint John campus)
- The Brunswickan (Fredericton campus)
- The Pillar (Engineering Newspaper) (Fredericton Campus)

=== Magazines and journals ===
- The Fiddlehead
- Studies in Canadian Literature
- Acadiensis

== See also ==
- List of oldest universities in continuous operation
- Higher education in New Brunswick
- List of universities and colleges in New Brunswick
- List of historic places in New Brunswick
- Maritime College of Forest Technology
- Atlantic University Sport
- Canadian government scientific research organizations
- Canadian university scientific research organizations
- Canadian industrial research and development organizations
