= Studies in Canadian Literature =

- Discipline: Literature
- Language: English, French
- Edited by: Cynthia Sugars

Publication details
- History: 1975 to present
- Publisher: University of New Brunswick (Canada)
- Frequency: Biannual

Standard abbreviations
- ISO 4: Stud. Can. Lit.

Indexing
- ISSN: 0380-6995

Links
- Journal homepage

Studies in Canadian Literature/Études en littérature canadienne (SCL/ÉLC) is a bilingual journal of peer-reviewed literary criticism published out of the University of New Brunswick.

Between the years of 1996 and 2003, John Clement Ball worked as editor of SCL/ÉLC; in September 2003, he was joined by Jennifer Andrews, and until mid-2012, the two collaborated as co-editors of the journal. In early 2012, the editors announced that Herb Wyile of Acadia University would replace Andrews as co-editor of the journal in the fall and that Cynthia Sugars of the University of Ottawa would replace Ball in the following year. Wyile and Sugars began co-editing the journal in 2013. Following the sudden death of Wyile in July 2016, Sugars became the sole editor. The journal continues to be published by the University of New Brunswick.

SCL/ÉLC publishes scholarly and critical articles, written by Canadian and international scholars, on all topics and periods of Canadian Literature. The journal publishes twenty-four essays per year, and issues occasionally close with interviews with notable Canadian authors. Like other Canadian literary journals, SCL/ÉLC alternates between general and special issues. Special topics have included the business of publishing in Canada; more recently, editors have produced issues on Indigeneity across linguistic divides, Atlantic Canadian literature, poetics and public culture in Canada, adolescence in Canadian Literature, South Asian Canadian Literature, and Literary Ecologies.

The publication of SCL/ÉLC is assisted by the Social Sciences and Humanities Research Council, the University of New Brunswick, and the Province of New Brunswick. The journal is indexed in the Canadian Periodical Index, the MLA Index, and the Humanities International Complete, and it is available online in the Canadian Business & Current Affairs (CBCA) Database. Back issues of the journal are available on the journal's website.

== History ==
Studies in Canadian Literature/Études en littérature canadienne was founded in 1975 by Barrie Davies, Desmond Pacey, Roger Ploude, and Michael Taylor. The journal has operated continuously since 1976.

Kathleen Scherf was the editor of SCL/ÉLC between the years of 1989 and 1996, and in 1991, the journal received an honorable mention from The Council of Editors of Learned Journals for their annual Phoenix Award for Significant Editorial Achievement.

=== 35th Anniversary ===
The 35th anniversary of SCL/ÉLC was celebrated at the 2011 meeting of the Canadian Association for Commonwealth Literature and Language Studies.

=== 40th Anniversary ===
In 2016, the journal celebrated the 40th anniversary of the publication of its first issue in 1976. Special sessions co-hosted by ACQL and CACLALS, as well as an anniversary celebration, took place at the 2015 Congress of the Social Sciences and Humanities in Ottawa. This milestone is commemorated by the journal with a special Anniversary issue on the topic "Canadian Literature: The Past Forty Years" (41.1).
