= Hans W. Klohn Commons =

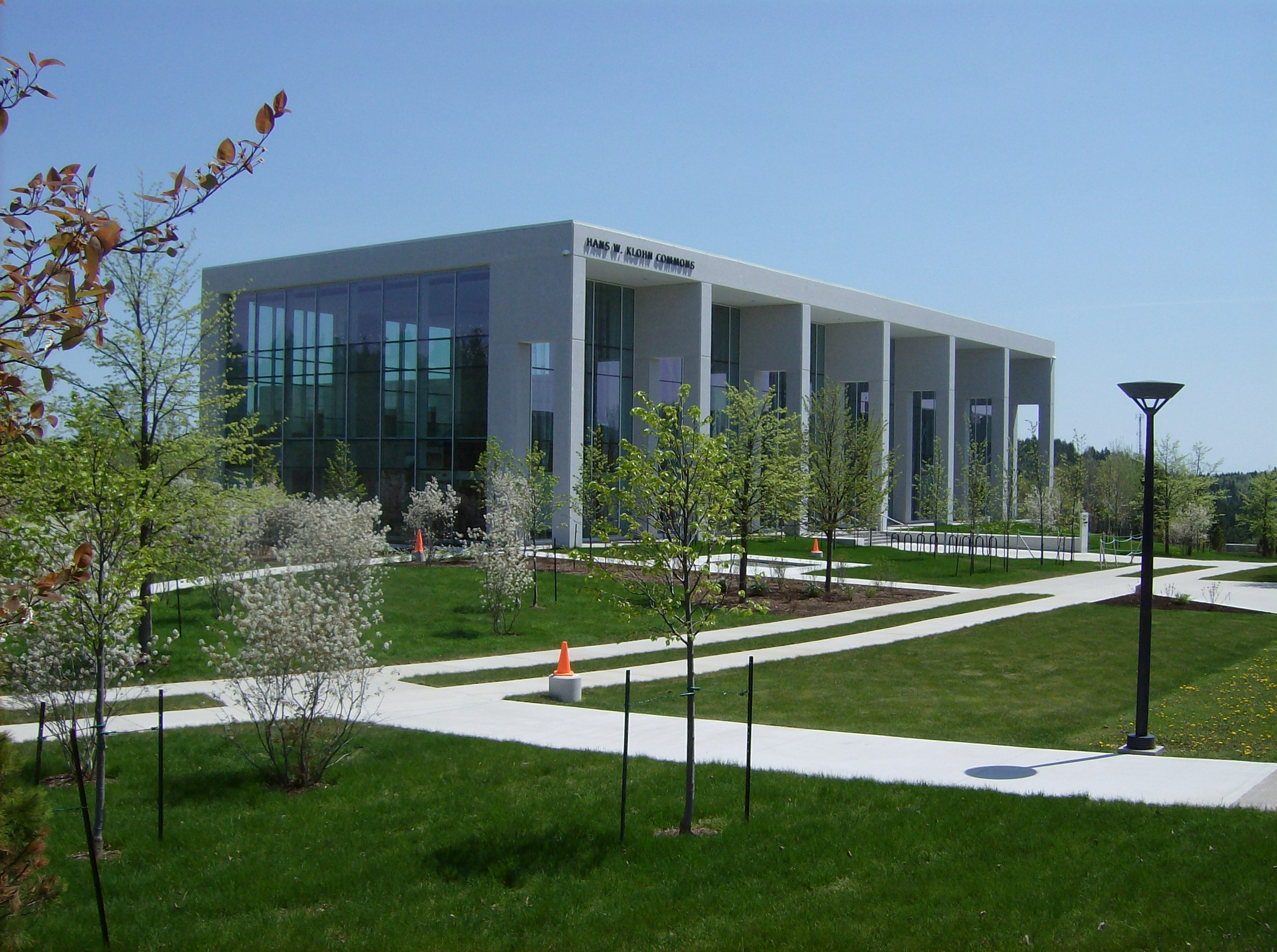
- Hans W. Klohn Commons in 2012
- 45.3053°N 66.0835°W
- Location: University of New Brunswick Saint John, Saint John, New Brunswick
- Type: Academic library
- Established: September 7, 2011; 15 years ago

The Hans W. Klohn Commons is the academic library of the University of New Brunswick (UNB) Saint John campus, located in Saint John, New Brunswick.

== Description ==
Construction on the Hans W. Klohn Commons first began in June 2006, with a $25 million budget provided by the federal, provincial, and municipal governments. Named after Hans W. Klohn, a German-born businessman and longtime associate of K. C. Irving. The building was officially opened on September 7, 2011, and was, at the time, one of Atlantic Canada's most environmentally friendly buildings. It is UNB's first green building, and had a LEED Silver Certification, which was later promoted to Gold Certified in 2014. Created as a replacement for the former Ward Chipman Library, the building was designed by B+H Architects and Sasaki along with Steen Knorr Architecture Inc.
