= Fredericton Transit =

Transit operator in Fredericton, New Brunswick, Canada

- Headquarters: 470 St. Mary's St.
- Locale: Fredericton, NB
- Service area: urban area
- Service type: bus service, paratransit
- Routes: 11 (With 7 additional routes that run only on Sunday)
- Hubs: Kings Place (Main); Regent Mall; Corbett Center; UNB Student Union Building; Maple Street
- Fleet: 37 buses
- Website: www.frederictontransit.ca

Fredericton Transit (or the City of Fredericton Transit Division) is the public transit operator owned by the city of Fredericton, New Brunswick, Canada. It also includes Paratransit service for people with disabilities, as well as an On Demand service for people along formerly serviced routes 18 and 20.

== Services ==
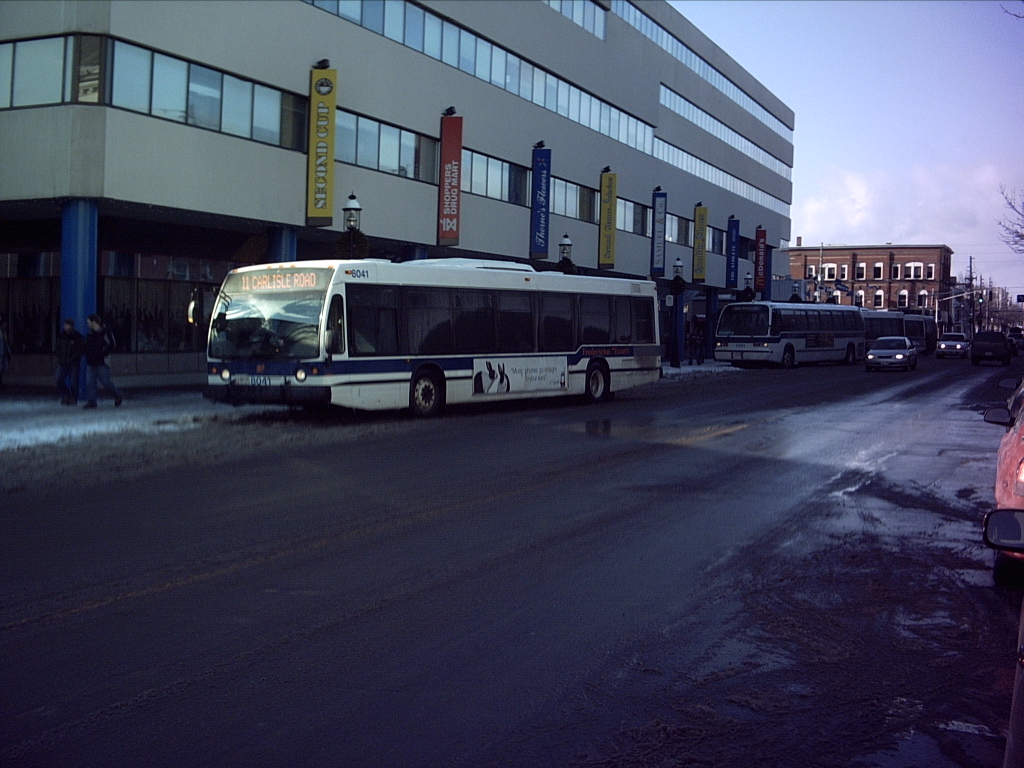
Kings Place (shown in this picture from 2005) is the main hub for Fredericton Transit.

Fredericton Transit provides public transport to most residential districts Monday to Saturday, between 6:15 am and 11:00 pm. Kings Place in the central business district is the common interchange point for all services. A typical route has an hourly frequency throughout the day, with more frequent services in peak hour on weekdays.

Fredericton Transit routes are often suffixed with N or S, denoting the direction in which the bus travels. As of June 22, 2026 Fredericton Transit operates the following routes:

Fredericton Transit Routes
No.	Name	Description and notes
10N	Carlisle	via Prospect / Main
11S	Prospect	via Main / Prospect
12N	Brookside	via Smythe / Brookside
13S	Prospect	via Brookside / Smythe
14N	Barker's Point	via York / Union
15S	Hanwell Park	via Union / York
16N	Marysville	via UNB / Dr. Everett Chalmers Regional Hospital / MacLaren
17S	Regent	via MacLaren / University of New Brunswick / Dr. Everett Chalmers Regional Hospital
116	Kings Place	via Skyline Acres / Southwood Park
216	Corbett Centre	via Southwood / Skyline Acres
300	Campus Connect	via UNB Student Union Building.

In addition to the above Monday to Saturday routes, as of June 2025, Fredericton Transit offers service on Sunday from 9am to 6pm.

Service on Sundays uses an completely unique route layout and schedule, focusing on quick movement across a singular side of the river with 2 East to West/West to East routes running on the cities Northside and 4 routes running mostly North to south/South to North on the cities southside, with a singular, crosstown route, allowing for quick movement across the Saint John (Wolastoq) river and between the north and south sides of the city.

Fredericton Transit Sunday Routes
No.	Name	Description and notes	Additional Notes
200	Crosstown	Via Two Nations, Regent Mall.	Crosstown express route. Runs North to South and South to North.
110	Forest Hill/Windsor	via Beaverbrook and Regent	Southside Route. Runs North to South and South to North.
120	Brookside/Marysvile	Via Royal Rd and MacLaren.	Northside Route. Runs east to west and west to east
130	Woodstock/Smythe	via Hanwell and Waggoners	Southside Route. Runs North to South and South to North.
140	River Run.	Via Sunset and Union.	Northside Route, Runs East to West and west to East
150	York/Hanwel	via Prospect	Southside Route. Runs North to South and South to North.
160	Skyline/Southwood Park	Via Southwood/Skyline Acres	Southside Route, Runs North to South and South to North

== Fleet ==
=== Current ===
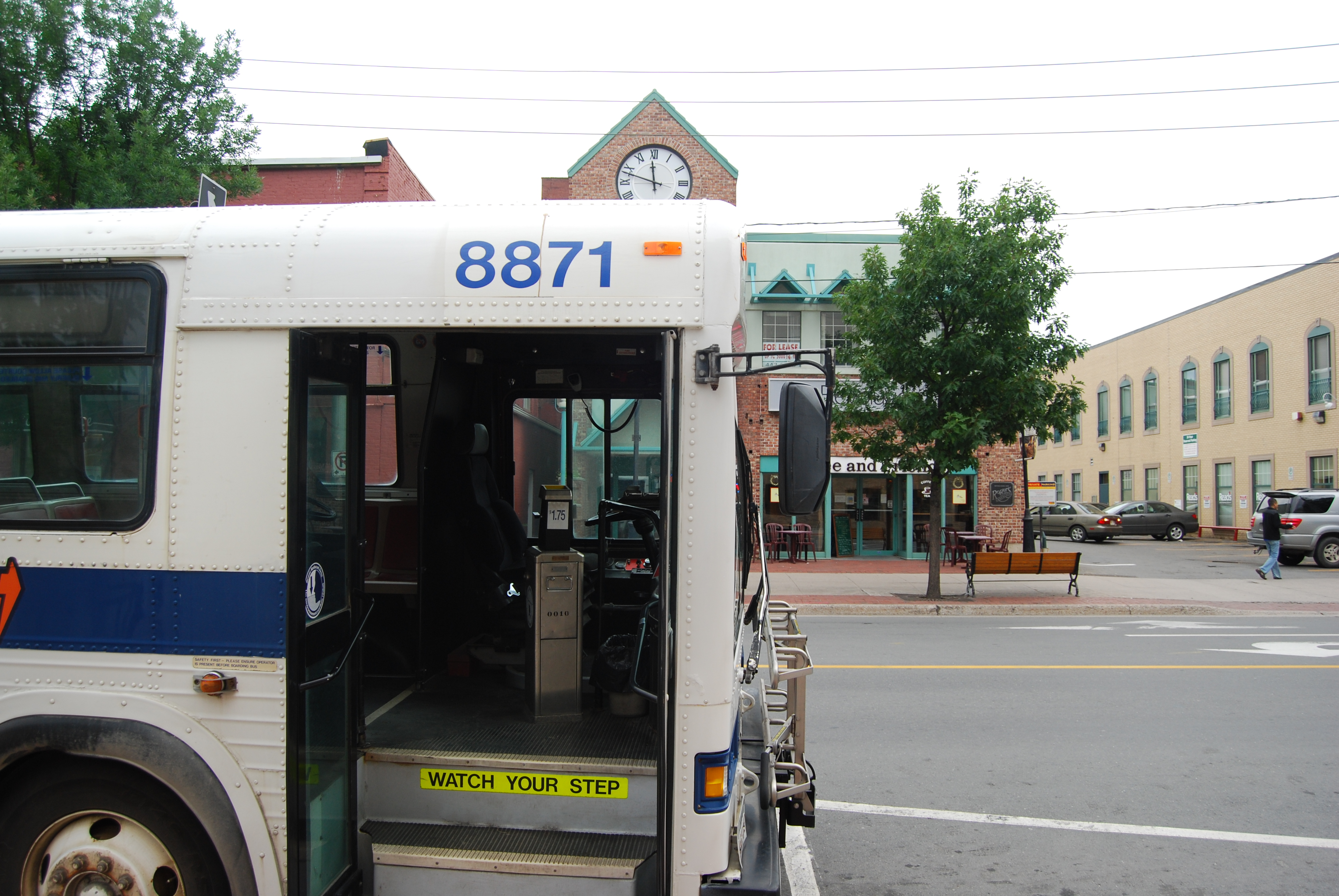
Fredericton Transit 8871, now retired

Fredericton Transit currently has 37 buses on 12 routes operating Monday to Saturday, with 7 additional routes running Sunday only.

- NovaBus LFS
- NovaBus LFS HEV
- New Flyer XDE40 "Xcelsior"

denotes wheelchair access

=== Retired ===
- General Motors Diesel Division Buses T6H-4523N
- General Motors Diesel Division Buses T6H-5307N
- General Motors Diesel Division Buses TC40-102N (Classic)
- Motor Coach Industries TC40-102N (Classic)
- Novabus TC40-102N (Classic)

== See also ==
- Public transport in Canada
