= New Brunswick Summer Music Festival =

Classical music festival in Canada

- Genre: Classical music, chamber music
- Locations: Fredericton, New Brunswick, Canada
- Years active: 1994–present
- Website: www.nbsummermusicfestival.ca

The New Brunswick Summer Music Festival presents classical chamber music, performed by some of Canada's finest performers. Concerts are held at Memorial Hall on the campus of the University of New Brunswick.

Founded in 1994, the festival focuses on the music of two composers, one well-known, and one less well-known; for example, the inaugural festival featured Ludwig van Beethoven and Ernő Dohnányi; the 2006 composers are Wolfgang Amadeus Mozart and Chevalier de Saint-Georges.
