= Kings Place Mall =

Kings Place

General information
- Location: 440 King Street, Fredericton, New Brunswick, Canada
- Opened: 1974; 52 years ago

Technical details
- Floor area: 290,000 sq ft

Design and construction
- Developer: The Hardman Group

Other information
- Number of stores: 30
- Parking: 417-car parkade

Website
- kingsplace.ca

Kings Place is a mixed-use office and retail complex in downtown Fredericton, New Brunswick, Canada. Located at 440 King Street, it consists of two office towers connected by ground-level retail space. The complex opened in 1974 and is one of the largest mixed-use developments in the province.

== History ==
Kings Place was developed by The Hardman Group in the early 1970s. The main complex was completed in 1974. An expansion completed in 1976 added 10,000 square feet of office space.

A food court was added in 1994. A major renovation was completed in 2001. In April 2002, Fortis Properties acquired Kings Place for $27.7 million.

Kings Place remains Fredericton's main downtown shopping centre and contains more than 30 shops and services.

=== Closures during the 2010s–2020s ===
By the mid-2010s, Kings Place had seen a growing number of vacant retail units, with space in the downtown mall going unfilled as businesses moved out. Losses during that period included the closure of the mall's longtime Second Cup location in late 2018. It was replaced by Starbucks in 2019, which also closed in 2023.

Despite the decline in retail, Kings Place has continued to serve as a major transit and office complex. Fredericton Transit has a major transfer point station along King Street.
