= Marysville Cotton Mill =

Mill in Marysville, New Brunswick, Canada

Marysville Place
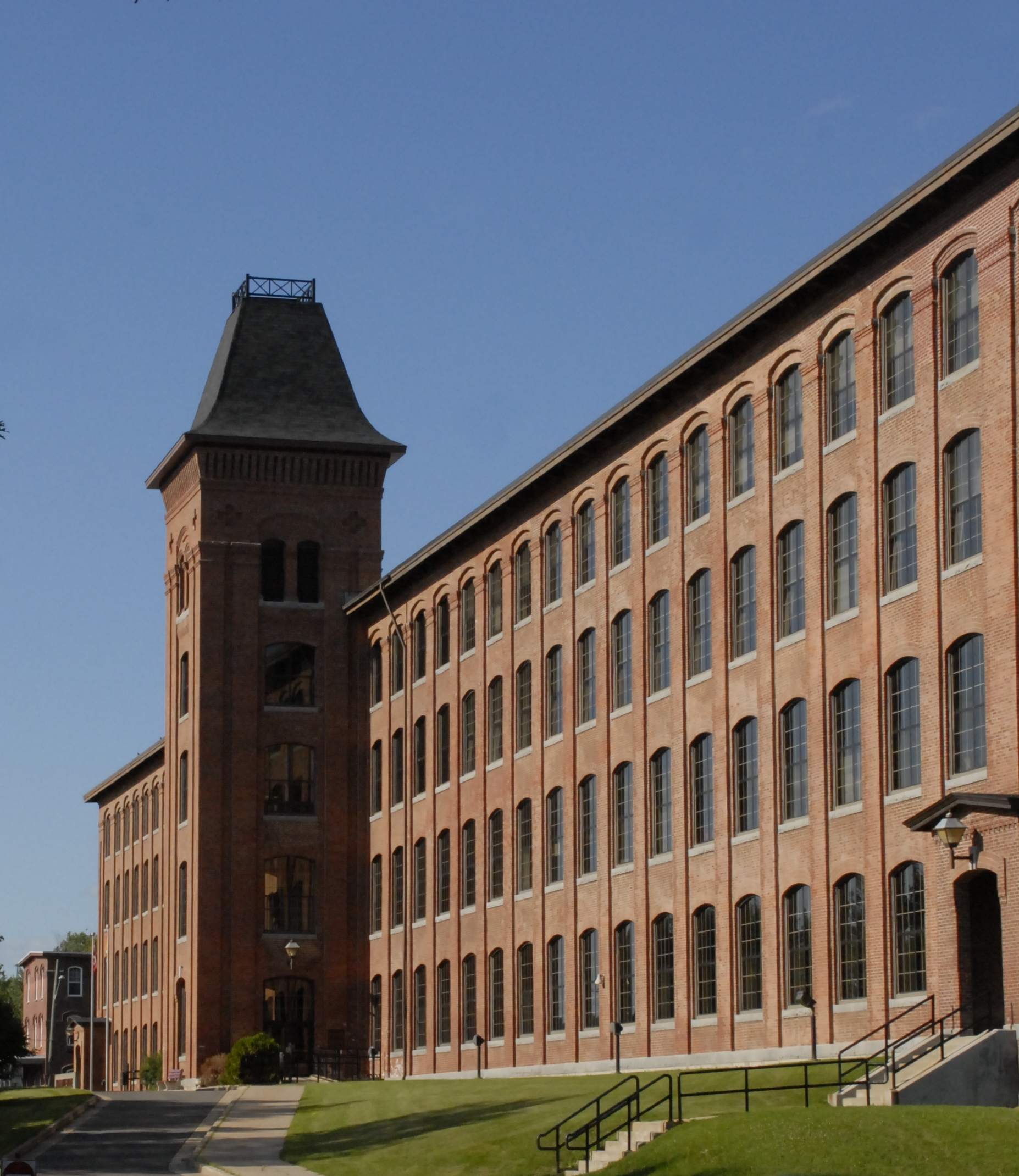
- Interactive map of the Marysville Place area
- Former names: Marysville Cotton Mill

General information
- Type: Cotton mill
- Location: Marysville, New Brunswick, Canada
- Coordinates: 45°58′42″N 66°35′20″W
- Construction started: 1883
- Completed: 1885
- Owner: Government of New Brunswick

Design and construction
- Engineer: Lockwood, Greene & Company
- Main contractor: Albert H. Kelsey

The Marysville Cotton Mill, now known as Marysville Place, is an industrial building in Marysville, New Brunswick, that is a National Historic Site of Canada. It was built by Alexander Gibson in the mid 1880s as he expanded his industrial operations into textile manufacturing at the company town he had established.

Since 1986, it has been used by the Government of New Brunswick as an office building and houses the Marysville Data Centre, a data centre used by government departments.

== Background ==
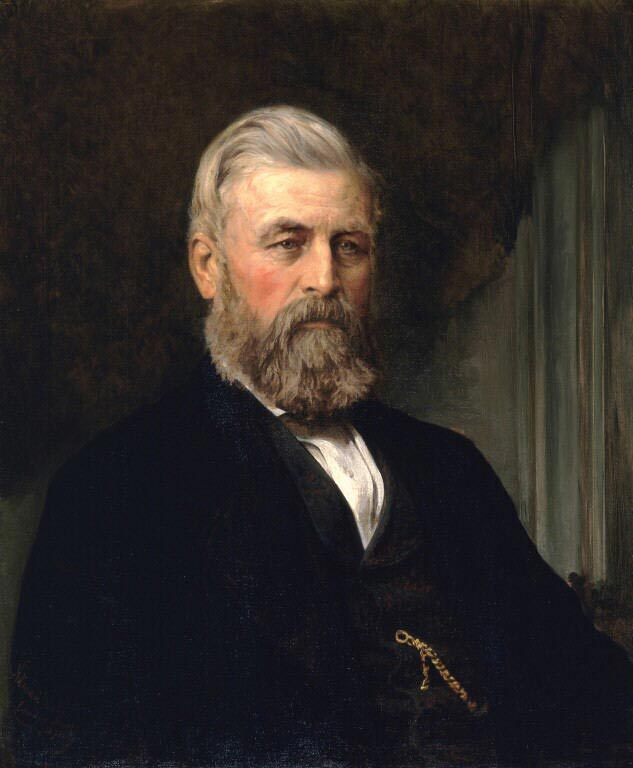
Alexander Gibson established the cotton mill and the company town of Marysville.

Alexander Gibson moved to what is now Marysville from Lepreau, Charlotte County in late 1862. For £7,300, he purchased a property that included a gristmill, a blacksmith shop, a general store, sawmills, a farm, "a number of houses well suited for workmen", and a 7,000-acre (28,000,000 m^{2}) of woodland. The sawmill operated on the Nashwaak River, on which he had acquired the rights to float logs and rafts to its mouth at the Saint John River.

The flow of water on the river was controlled by dams Gibson had built, ensuring he could transport logs along it throughout the year. When the government offered a grant of 10,000 acres (40,000,000 m^{2}) per 1 mile (1.6 km) of railway track built in the province, Gibson funded the construction of a narrow-gauge railway line to Chatham, for which he received a total grant of 1,647,000 acres (6,670 km^{2}). He sold the railway for $800,000.

His new property had poor sanitation, with the "buildings filthy" and typhoid fever endemic. He had the site cleared, then built a model village named Marysville to house the workers and their families with the funds from the railway sale. These were located on the east side of the river near the cotton mill. On the west side of the river were built mansions on hills for Gibson and the managers. A footbridge across the Nashwaak River connected the 24 duplex houses, known as "White Row", to the nearby mills. Gibson also established a brickyard to manufacture bricks, instead of purchasing them from elsewhere, which was used for the cotton mill, the tenement buildings, and other buildings in the town.

== Mill ==
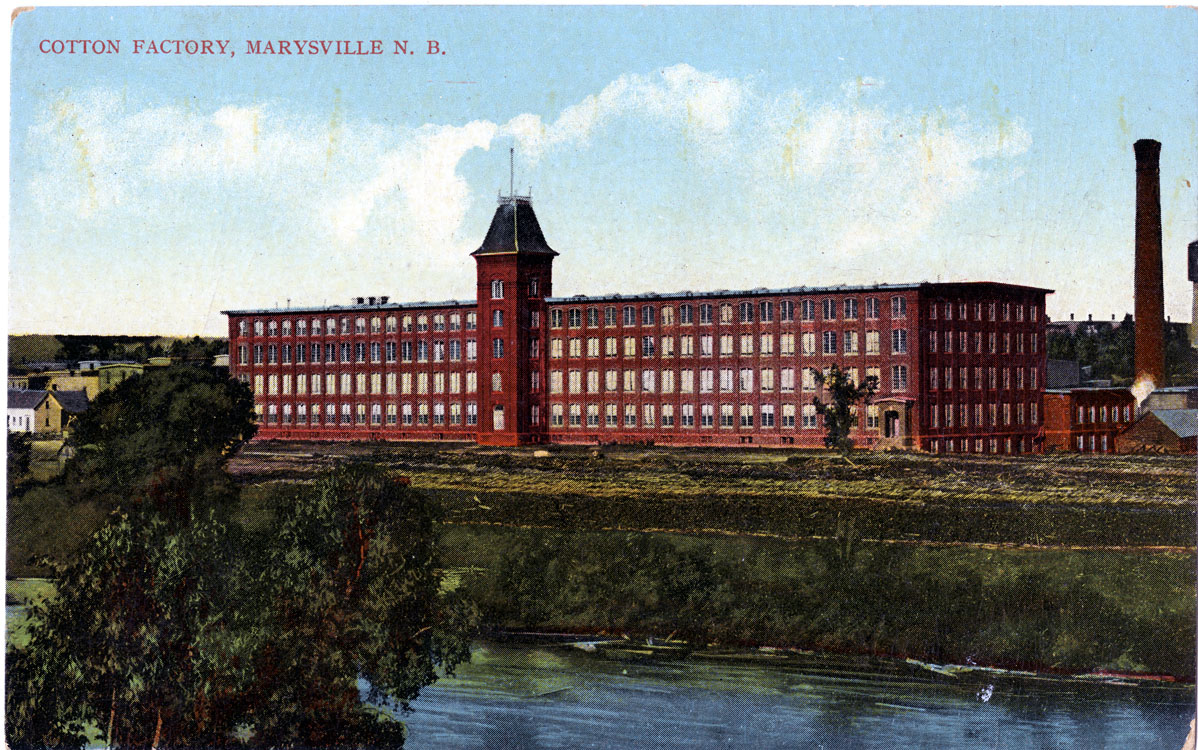
A 1910 postcard depicting the mill on the east bank of the Nashwaak River

The mill's construction began in 1883 and was completed in 1885. Its design was influenced by the mill designs of New England, and used a brick pier foundation. The building was designed by Lockwood, Greene & Company, an engineering firm based in Providence, Rhode Island, and built by contractor Albert H. Kelsey.

Along with the operation in Milltown (now part of St. Stephen), Marysville Cotton Mill was the largest and most isolated of mills in The Maritimes. The company built a church and a school, and operated a company store that deducted its bills and housing rents from employee's pay. Employees were paid once a month, that with the company housing and requisite family labour would "maximize dependence and discourage sudden resignations". Employees were provided land for kitchen gardens and to use as pasture, and received free firewood.

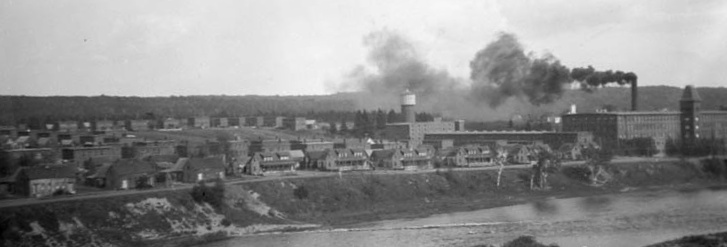
The cotton mill and tenement buildings of Marysville in 1927

The industrious Gibson was well-respected by his employees, which constituted the bulk of the town's population. Workers were awakened in the morning by a steam whistle sounded from the factory, which was also sounded to dismiss them after a ten-hour work-day.

== Description ==
Marysville Cotton Mill is a large, brick building on the east bank of the Nashwaak River, at the intersection of Bridge Street and Rue McGloin. It is in Marysville, now the most northeasterly suburb of Fredericton, with which it was amalgamated in 1973. Each storey of the building has a row of identical multi-pane mullion windows.

The four storey structure is 418 feet (127 m) long and 100 feet (30 m) wide. It was the first building in Fredericton to have electric lighting, and had a sprinkler system. Most of the materials were obtained locally, with the exception of the southern hard pine used for the posts and beams.

== National Historic Site ==
The cotton mill was designated a National Historic Site of Canada on 16 June 1986. The neighbourhood of Marysville was declared a national historic district on 20 November 1993, and on 8 June 2007, Alexander Gibson was designated a Person of National Historic Significance. The railway line was converted into a hiking trail.

== Use ==
The mill manufactured textiles until its closing in the 1970s. In 1985, the Government of New Brunswick undertook a project to restore the building, and when complete its first tenant became the Department of Tourism, Recreation and Heritage.

Today, the Government of New Brunswick uses it as an office building, and it is known as Marysville Place. It was used as the site of the Marysville Data Centre up until 2016, a data centre used by a number of the government's departments, among them the Department of Finance, Department of Health, Department of Justice and Attorney General, Department of Public Safety, and Department of Social Development. It has since been repurposed as an office building for several government departments.
