= Alexander Gibson (industrialist) =

Canadian industrialist (1818–1913)

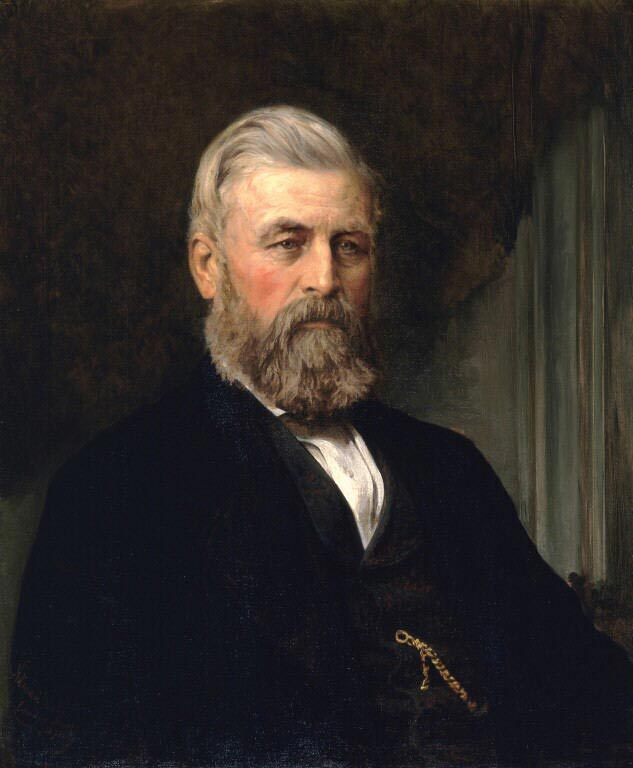
- Alexander Gibson in 1870
- Born: 1 August 1820; St. Andrews, New Brunswick, Canada
- Died: 14 August 1913 (aged 94); Marysville, New Brunswick, Canada
- Resting place: Alexander Gibson Memorial Cemetery
- Occupations: Lumber merchant, Industrialist
- Known for: Marysville Cotton Mill
- Spouse: Mary Ann Robinson (1843—1898)
- Children: Alexander Gibson Jr.

Alexander "Boss" Gibson (1 August 1820 – 14 August 1913) was a Canadian industrialist in New Brunswick, Canada. His business interests included sawmills, railways, and a cotton mill. He founded the company town of Marysville, New Brunswick.

== Early life ==
Alexander Gibson was born in St. Andrews, New Brunswick on 1 August 1820. He was the first of seven children born to John Gibson and his wife Mary Jane Johnson, who had immigrated to Canada from Ireland in 1818, accompanied by John Gibson's parents, Alexander Gibson Sr. and Janet Moore, brothers James and Stuart, and sister Margaret. During Alexander Gibson's childhood in the 1820s the family lived in a log house and farmed six acres of land. The grandparents seem both to have been born in Scotland, but all of the children were of Irish birth. Unlike the waves of poor Irish who were beginning to land in the Maritimes (St. Andrews alone landed several thousands between 1817 and 1818), Gibson's grandfather seems not to have been poor, as he speculated modestly in land in St. Andrews until about 1825, when he applied for and was granted a 60-acre tract of farmland in Oak Bay, near St. Stephen, selling two 20-acre lots and reserving the easternmost portion for his own family. John Gibson, the Boss's father, is given as "shoemaker" on his son's baptismal record, but became a farmer upon the move to Oak Bay.

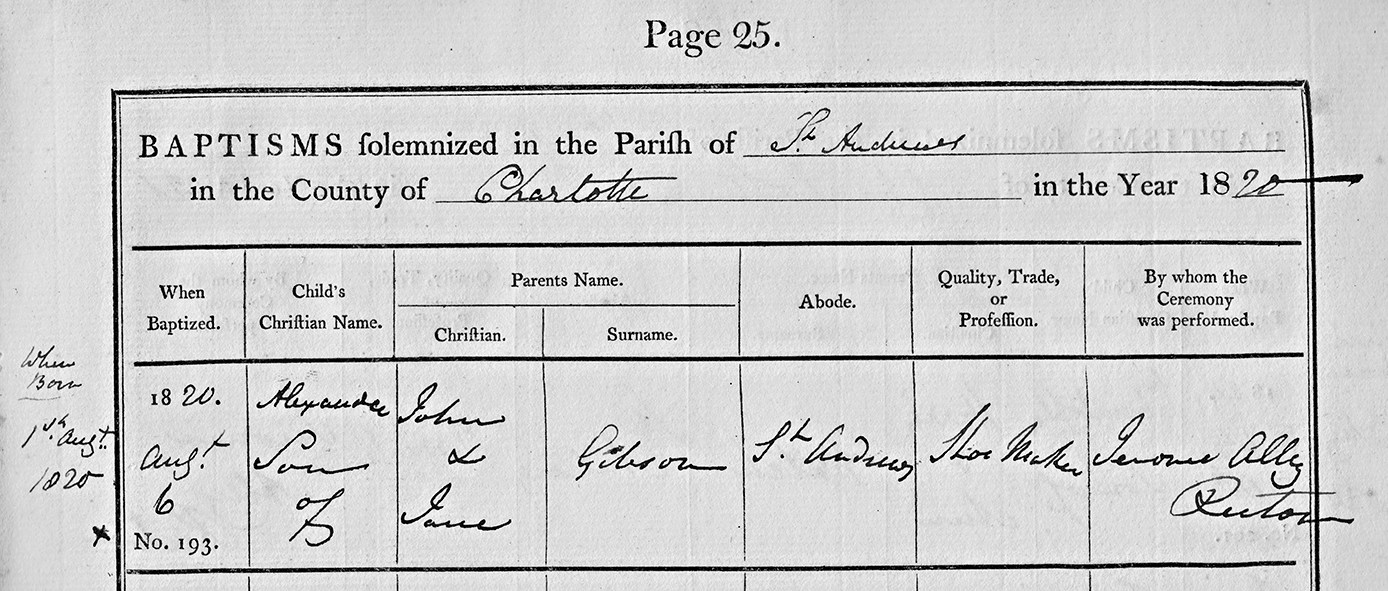
Baptismal record for Alexander Gibson, August 6, 1820, with accompanying birth record. Courtesy All Saints Church, St. Andrews, NB

Gibson married Mary Ann Robinson on 31 December 1843. She had been born in County Donegal, Ireland in 1827, two years before her parents emigrated to Canada and settled in Baillie Settlement, one of many tiny farming communities surrounding St. Stephen and Milltown, little more that what one commentator described as "windows in the forest.". Alexander Gibson and his wife were to have twelve children, of whom six lived to adulthood.

== Sawmills and lumbering ==
Alexander Gibson went to work in the sawmills in Milltown, New Brunswick, first as a laborer, then as sawyer and later mill manager. He became an expert at managing water-powered mills using the innovative gang saws which were first used in the area in the 1840s. In the 1850s, with an American partner, Gibson leased a sawmill and water rights on the Lepreau River in Charlotte County, New Brunswick.

In 1862 Gibson left Charlotte County and purchased land and a sawmill operation on the Nashwaak River near Fredericton. A company directed by Robert Rankin owned the operation, which was failing because of poor management and had been offered for sale for several years before Gibson purchased it for £7,300. The property included sawmills, a gristmill, a store, a blacksmith shop, and "a number of houses well suited for workmen", as well as a farm and 7,000 acres of woodland. The purchase price also included the right to float logs and rafts down the Nashwaak River to its mouth in the Saint John River across from the city of Fredericton.

Gibson immediately began to improve and expand the operation. He enlarged the mill pond by putting a chain of piers across the river above an existing dam, and built more dams in order to improve the flow of logs to his sawmills. He also renovated the mills, outfitting them with double gang saws, and brought in experienced workers from Lepreau to run them. In the spring of 1863 the mills began sawing 3 inch planks, called deals, which were floated to a log boom at the mouth of the Nashwaak. They were then taken on lighters or rafts down the Saint John River to the port of Saint John, New Brunswick, and thence to the British or American markets. Eventually Gibson also shipped wood to South America, Australia, and the West Indies. At times his wood production accounted for more than half of the goods exported annually from the port of Saint John.

In his first 10 years of operation on the Nashwaak, Gibson was granted 30,000 acres of forested Crown Land, and bought another 93,000 acres of forest from the New Brunswick and Nova Scotia Land Company.

== Railways ==
In 1864 the New Brunswick government passed the Railway Facility Act, which encouraged the building of railways by giving companies a subsidy of $10,000 per mile. The first railway company in the Fredericton area was the Fredericton Railway Company, of which Gibson was a director. It was incorporated in 1866 to build a line from Fredericton to the community of Hartt's Mills. When it opened in November 1867 it joined the Western Extension of the European and North American Railway which ran from Maine to Saint John, New Brunswick.

Gibson's second railway venture was as a director, and later president, of the New Brunswick Land and Railway Company, which received a provincial government charter in 1870 to build a line north to Edmundston. The province granted the company 10,000 acres of crown land per mile of track, for a total of 1,647,772 acres of forested land. The charter stipulated that construction must start in three years, with completion in eight years. After two years of unsuccessful efforts by the company to raise money in England to finance construction, Gibson offered to pay one quarter of the cost. Gibson took over as president of the company and with the granting of another $225,000 by city and county governments, construction began in May 1872. The railway, which was called the "Gibson Line" reached Edmundson in 1878. Its southern terminus was at the village of Gibson (named after Alexander Gibson) on the north bank of the Saint John River near the mouth of the Nashwaak. In 1880 the company was sold and Alexander Gibson received $800,000 for his shares.

Gibson's involvement in a third railway company took place when he opened the Marysville Cotton Mill, which was not yet served by a railway line. In 1882 he became president of the Northern and Western Railway Company, which had been incorporated to build a railway from Fredericton to the towns of Newcastle and Chatham on the Miramichi River in northeastern New Brunswick. The federal and provincial governments pledged subsidies of $3,000 and $3,200 per mile, respectively. A line between Gibson and Marysville was completed in the summer of 1884, while the remainder was finished by September 1886. In 1893 Gibson bought out his partner Jabez Bunting Snowball and became sole owner of the company, which had become the Canada Eastern Railway in 1890. In 1904 he sold the railway to the federal government for $800,000.

Gibson was president of the Fredericton and St. Mary's Railway Bridge Company, which was incorporated by federal government in 1885 to build the bridge across the Saint John River between Fredericton and Gibson. The Fredericton Railway Bridge was completed in June 1888.

== Cotton mill ==
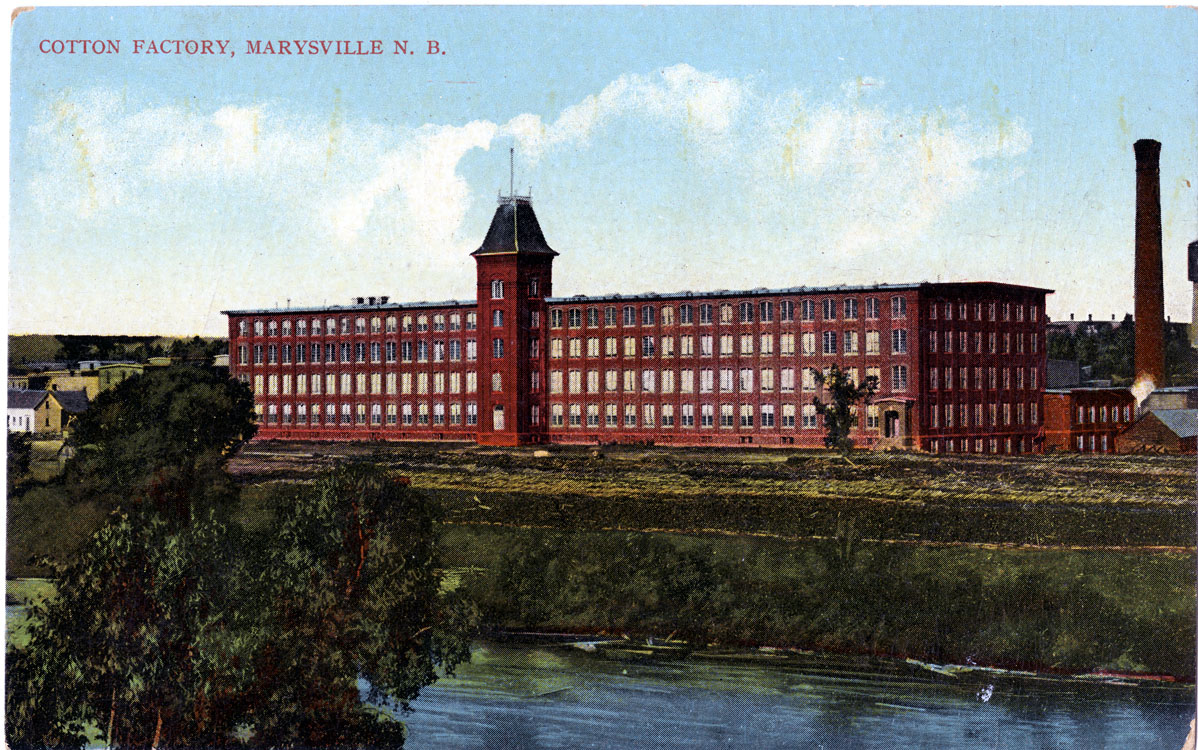
A postcard view of the cotton mill in the early 1900s

In 1883 Gibson embarked on a new venture, the manufacture of cotton textiles. The protectionist National Policy of 1879 encouraged the building of cotton mills in Canada, particularly in the Atlantic Provinces, and Gibson soon had one of the largest in Canada. The mill, which was designed by Lockwood, Greene & Co. of Providence, Rhode Island, had four storeys and was 418 feet long by 100 feet wide. It had steam heat and a sprinkler system as fire protection. Its 800 carbon arc electric lights were the first in the Fredericton area.

Most of the building materials came from Gibson's own land. The bricks were manufactured on the site, from clay dug on Gibson's property. Brick was used to construct rows of duplex houses for the mill workers, as well as a brick hotel to house unmarried female employees. Raw cotton from the United States started arriving at Marysville in 1885 and the mill was in full production by the end of 1889, employing 500 people by 1893.

== Marysville ==
When Gibson arrived at his newly purchased property on the Nashwaak in 1862 he found poor sanitation and endemic typhoid fever. Gibson had the site cleaned up and then built a new model village to accommodate the mill workers and their families, calling it Marysville after his wife and his eldest daughter, both of whom were named Mary. He had 24 duplex houses built on the opposite side of the river from the mill, with a foot bridge crossing the river. Gibson paid for the building of a school, which opened in 1864 and included a library room containing 300 books.

The top floor of Gibson's large new store was used as a Methodist meeting-house until he funded the construction of a magnificent Methodist church. The Marysville Methodist Church, which cost Gibson over $65,000, was dedicated on 5 January 1873. Built of wood in Gothic Revival style, it was octagonal in shape with a 156-foot spire. It was framed with imported southern pine with walnut, mahogany and ash interior fittings, and had elaborate stained glass windows imported from England. Gibson paid the minister's and organist's salaries and gave each choir member an annual stipend.

The New Brunswick Legislature passed an act incorporating the Town of Marysville in April 1886. As well as naming the town after his wife and daughter, Gibson chose the pine tree as the image to appear on the town's crest. In the town's first election in January 1887, his son Alexander Gibson Jr. was elected mayor, a position he held until 1908.

The building of the cotton mill and worker's houses in the 1880s transformed the community, which was designated the Marysville Historic District National Historic Site of Canada in 1993. It was described as "among the earliest and most complete Canadian examples of an integrated industrial/ residential community", while the "high quality, brick construction of both tenements and mill reflect Gibson's optimism for the community". The cotton mill building received a separate National Historic Site designation in 1986.

== Later years and legacy ==
The Canadian cotton textile industry, including Gibson's enterprise, soon ran into difficulties. These included a shortage of skilled workers, competition for raw materials, and dependence on imported technology. Most serious was that the market could not support the amount of cotton cloth produced by all the mills. Gibson refused to join a trade association organized as early as 1886 to try to prevent overproduction, but in 1892 he agreed to market all his production through the Canadian Colored Cotton Mills Company Limited of Montreal.

Through the 1890s, also, his lumber export business became less profitable, due to the increasing age of his mills and the declining supply of suitable lumber on his land. He reorganized and recapitalized his businesses, first as Alexander Gibson & Sons in 1897, and then as the Alexander Gibson Railroad and Manufacturing Company in 1900. Finally, he was unable to extricate himself from his financial difficulties. The cotton mill property was taken over by the Canadian Colored Cotton Mills Company in 1907, while his remaining business assets were transferred to his creditors in 1908. He received an annual pension of $5,000 and the right to live in his house in Marysville for the rest of his life. Alexander Gibson died at his home in Marysville on 14 August 1913, at the age of ninety four. His wife had predeceased him in 1898.

Alexander Gibson was remembered as a generous philanthropist as well as a "hard-driving entrepreneur". He was recognized as a Person of National Historic Significance by the Canadian government in 2007. The citation noted that he was "a pivotal figure in the economy of the Maritimes at a time of transformation and integration within the national economy" and that he "left an important legacy of railway and industrial infrastructure in his province". The Gibson family plot in the Alexander Gibson Memorial Cemetery in Fredericton was recognized as a local historic place in 2010.
