= Fredericton =

Capital city of New Brunswick, Canada

- City and provincial capital
- The City of Fredericton (Note: Legal name is The City of Fredericton. Even in French, the legal name is The City of Fredericton.)
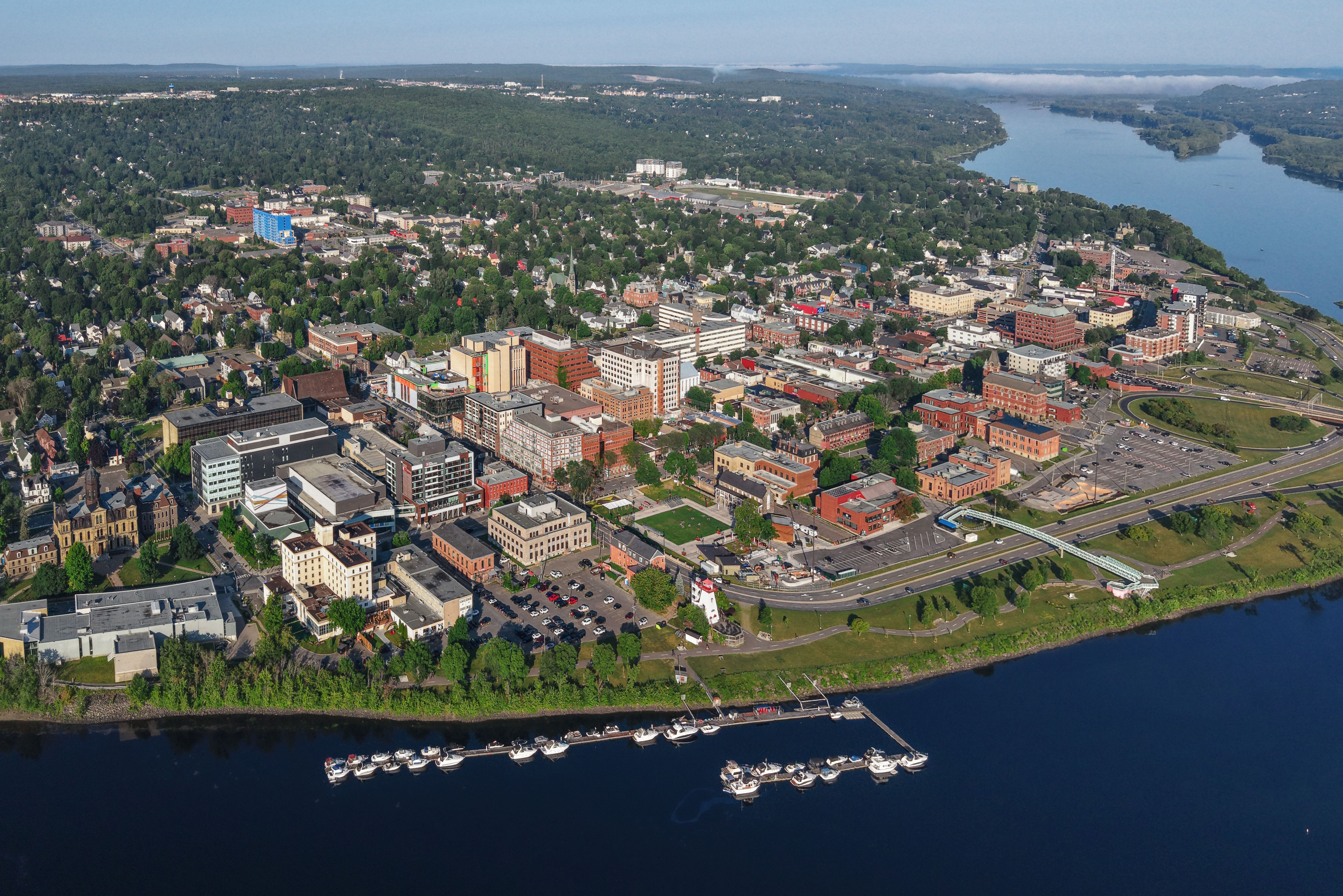
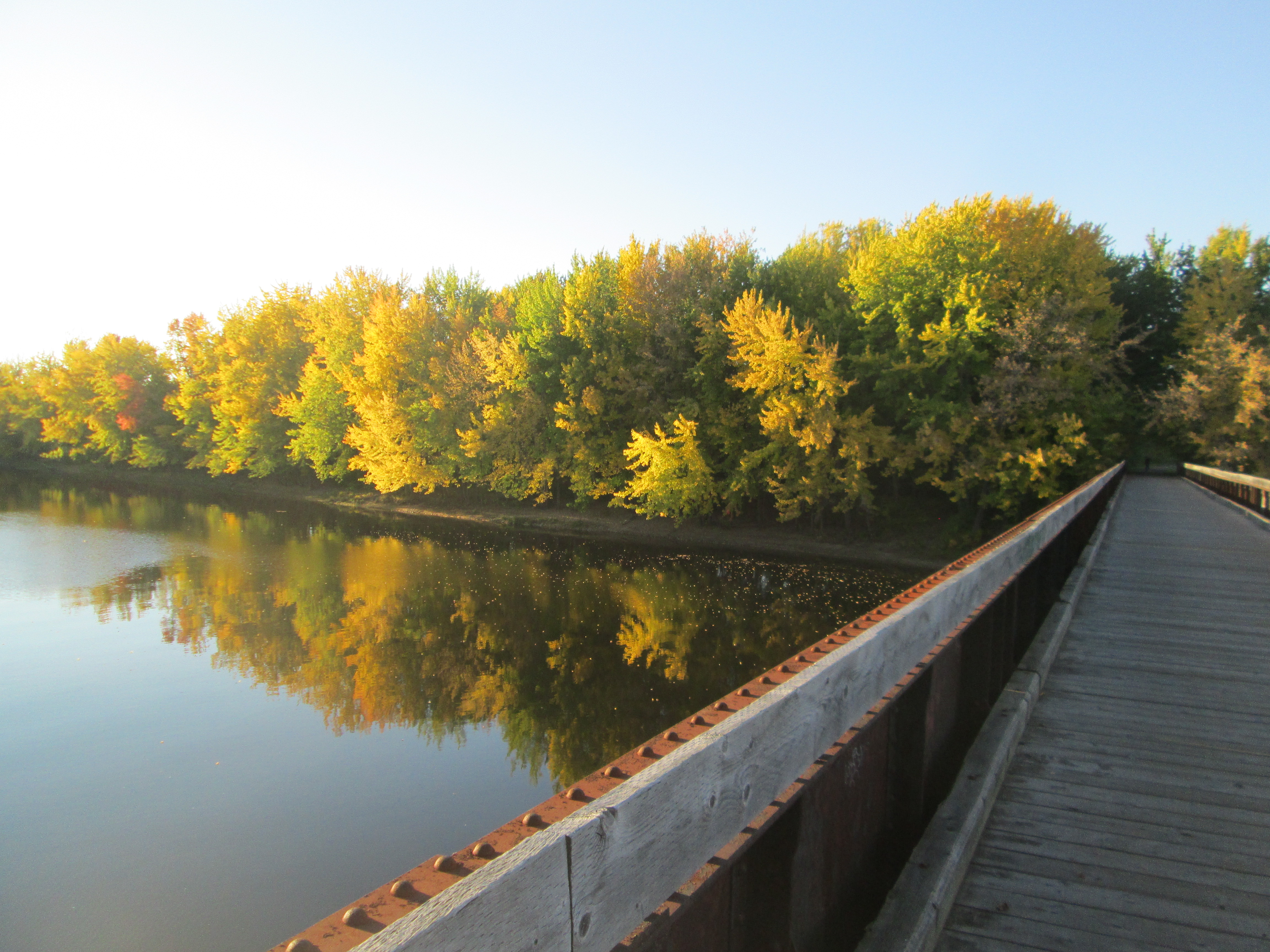
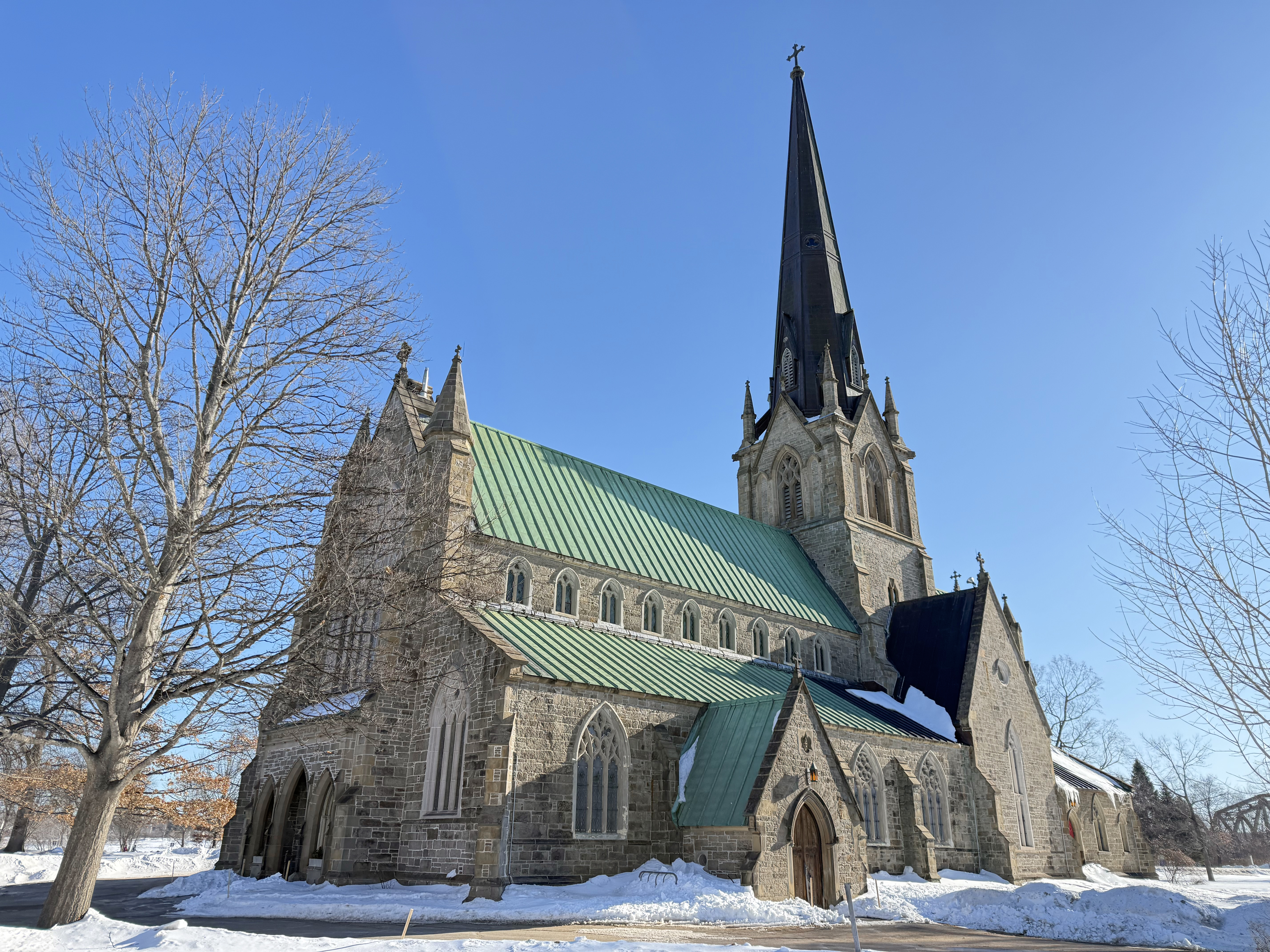
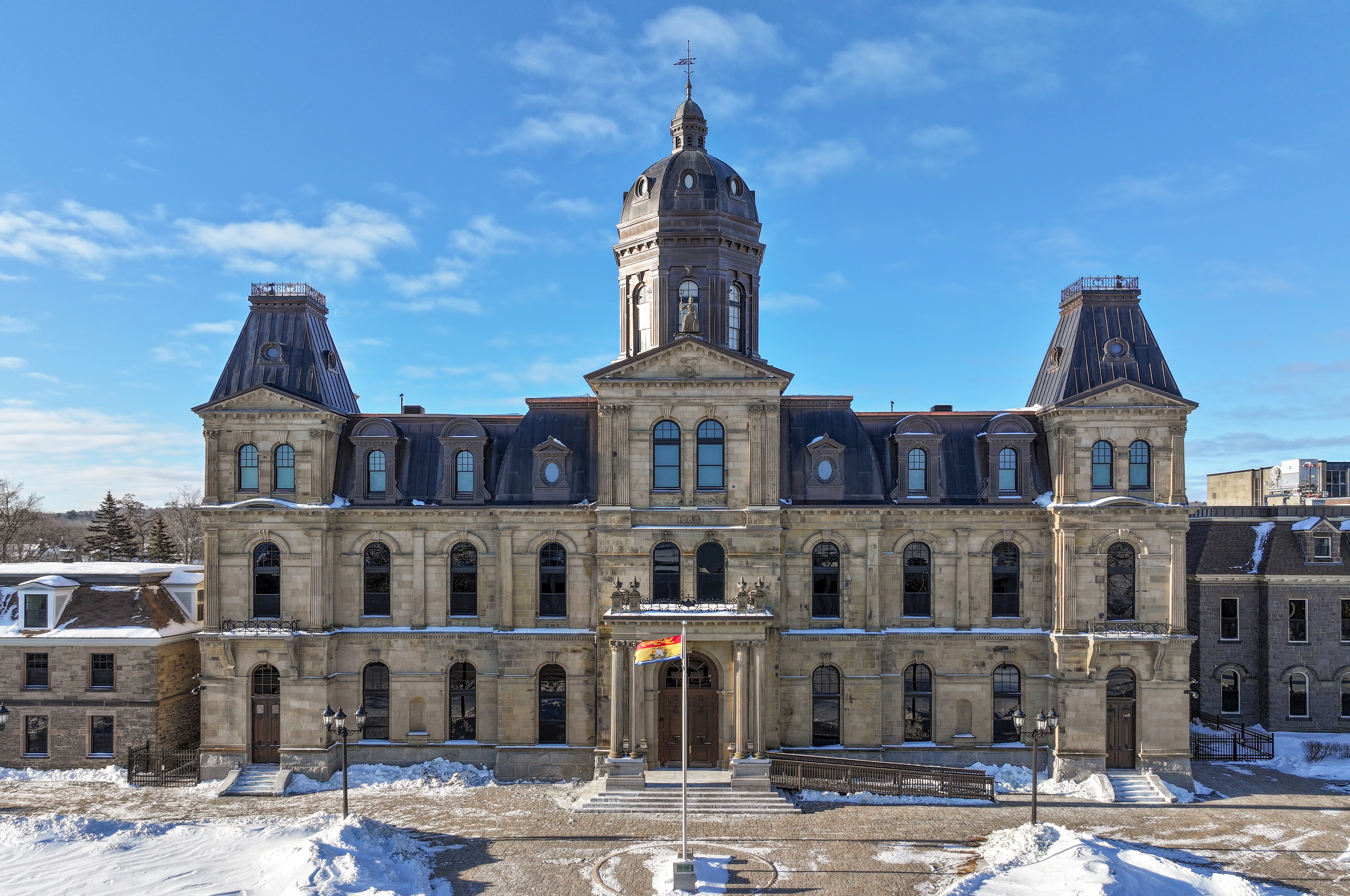
- From top to bottom; left to right: Fredericton skyline, Pedestrian bridge of the Nashwaak River, Christ Church Cathedral, New Brunswick Legislative Building

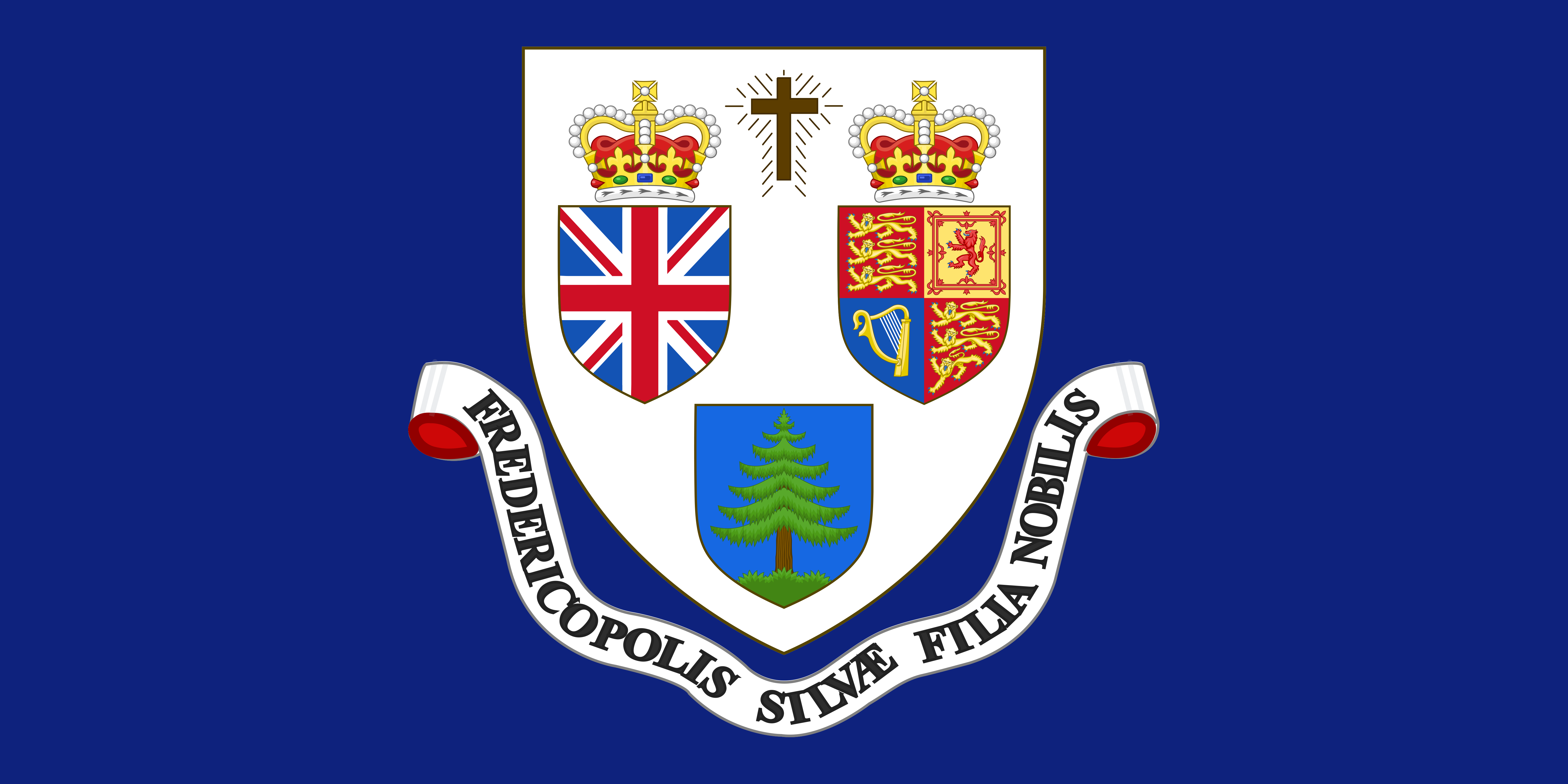
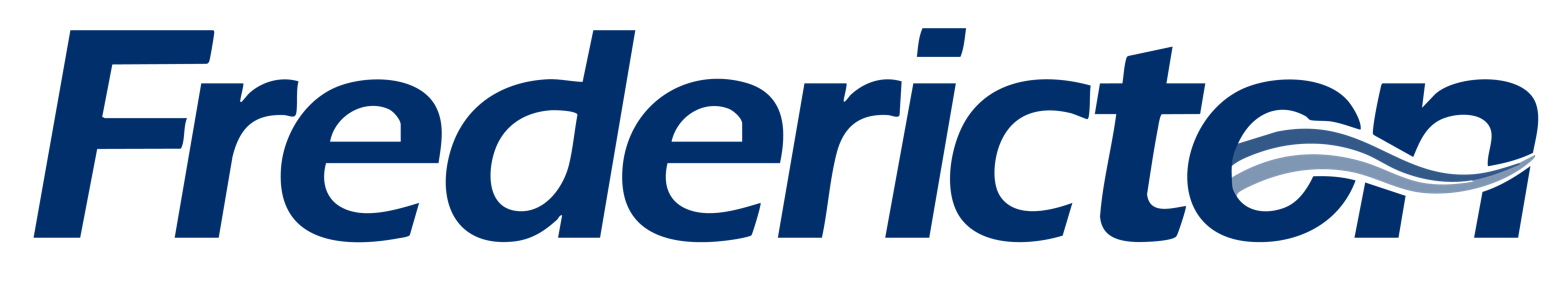
- Flag Coat of arms Logo
- Nicknames: Freddy, Freddy Beach
- Motto(s): "Fredericopolis, silvae filia nobilis" (Latin) "Fredericton, noble daughter of the forest"
- Interactive map of Fredericton
- Location within New Brunswick Location within Canada
- Coordinates: 45°56′43″N 66°40′00″W
- Country: Canada
- Province: New Brunswick
- County(s): York, Sunbury
- Metropolitan area: Greater Fredericton
- Erected: 1786
- Incorporated: 1848
- Named for: Prince Frederick, Duke of York and Albany

Government
  - Type: Fredericton City Council
  - Mayor: Steve Hicks
  - MPs: David Myles (Lib.); Richard Bragdon (Con.)
  - MLAs: Luke Randall (Lib); David Coon (Green); Kris Austin (PC); Susan Holt (Lib); Ryan Cullins (PC)

Area
  - City: 133.93 km^{2} (51.71 sq mi)
  - Metro: 6,014.66 km^{2} (2,322.27 sq mi)
- Elevation: 20–100 m (66–328 ft)

Population (2021)
  - City: 63,116
  - Density: 471.3/km^{2} (1,221/sq mi)
  - Metro: 108,610
  - Metro density: 18.1/km^{2} (47/sq mi)
- Demonym: Frederictonian
- Time zone: UTC−04:00 (AST)
  - Summer (DST): UTC−03:00 (ADT)
- Postal code(s): E3A, E3B, E3C, E3E, E3G
- Area code: 506 and 428
- NTS Map: 21G15 Fredericton
- GNBC Code: DAFMJ
- Website: fredericton.ca/en

Fredericton (/ˈfrɛ.drɪk.tən/; French pronunciation: [fʁedeʁiktœn]) is the capital city of the Canadian province of New Brunswick. The city is situated in the west-central portion of the province along the Saint John River, which flows west to east as it bisects the city. The river is the dominant natural feature of the area. One of the main urban centres in New Brunswick, as of 2026, according to the city's update on building development, it has a population of approximately 79,000 with the metropolitan population in 2025 estimated at 125,303. It is the third-largest city in the province, after Moncton and Saint John.

An important cultural, artistic, and educational centre for the province, Fredericton is home to two universities, The University of New Brunswick and St. Thomas University, as well as the New Brunswick College of Craft and Design, New Brunswick Community College and cultural institutions such as the Beaverbrook Art Gallery, the Fredericton Region Museum, and The Playhouse, a performing arts venue. The city hosts the annual Harvest Jazz & Blues Festival, attracting regional and international jazz, blues, rock, and world artists. The city also hosts the Garrison Night Market during the summer months which showcases many local vendors, artists, and musicians. Fredericton is also an important and vibrant centre for the region's top visual artists with artists such as Goodridge Roberts, and Molly and Bruno Bobak having lived and worked here.

As a provincial capital, its economy is tied to the public sector; however, the city also has a growing IT and commercial sector. The city has the highest percentage of residents with post-secondary education in the province and the highest per capita income of any city in New Brunswick.

== History ==
There is archaeological evidence of a camp in the area 12,000 years ago, and the Wolastoqiyik farmed several kilometres upriver.

Colonists from the Kingdom of France in the late 1600s built Fort Nashwaak on the north side of the Saint John River, as the capital of Acadia. It withstood a British attack in 1696, but the capital was later moved to Port Royal (Annapolis Royal). In 1713, Acadians escaping the British takeover of Nova Scotia settled the site, naming it Pointe Ste-Anne. It was destroyed in 1758 when the population of about 83 were exiled during the expulsion of the Acadians.

It was in 1783, when United Empire Loyalists arrived from New England, that the history of modern Fredericton began. The following year, New Brunswick was partitioned from Nova Scotia and became its own colony. Pointe-Ste-Anne was renamed "Fredericstown", after Frederick, second son of King George III. It became the capital of the new colony, being considered to have a better defensive position than larger Saint John.

The streets were laid out in the typical grid pattern of the time, with the names reflecting loyalist tendencies: Charlotte, Brunswick, George, King, and Queen.

In 1785, it became the shire town of York County. In 1790 the New Brunswick Legislative Building was constructed. As a centre of government, it attracted educational institutions, with King's College (now the University of New Brunswick) being the first English-language university in Canada, and religious institutions, with Christ Church Cathedral being built as the seat of the Anglican Diocese of Fredericton in 1853.

It was a British garrison town from 1784 to 1869, and the military compound is preserved as a National Historic Site of Canada.

With the New Brunswick Equal Opportunity program in the 1960s, county councils were abolished, and government services were centralized provincially in Fredericton, increasing jobs and population.

On 1 January 2023, Fredericton annexed parts of five local service districts;

== Geography ==
The Saint John River runs through Fredericton. The city's downtown core lies on the flat low-lying ground on either side of the river, with most of the city's post-war suburban development occurring on the gently sloping hills of the river valley.

At an altitude of about 17 m (56 ft) above sea level, Fredericton is nestled in the Pennsylvanian Basin. It differs markedly from the geologically older parts of the province. There are prominently two distinct areas in the region that are divided around the area of Wilsey Road, in the east end of the city. In the west side, the bedrock underneath the earth is topographically dominant, whereas the other is controlled by Pleistocene and recent deposits leading to the rivers (resulting in the area being shallow and wide). Fredericton and its surroundings are rich in water resources, which, coupled with highly arable soil, make the Fredericton region ideal for agriculture. The Saint John River and one of its major tributaries, the Nashwaak River, come together in Fredericton. The uninhabited parts of the city are heavily forested.

=== Climate ===
Fredericton

Climate chart (precipitation, max. and min. temperature)
| J | F | M | A | M | J | J | A | S | O | N | D |
| 95 −4 −15 | 73 −2 −14 | 93 3 −8 | 86 10 −1 | 96 18 5 | 82 23 10 | 88 26 13 | 86 25 12 | 88 20 7 | 89 13 2 | 106 6 −3 | 95 −1 −11 |
- █ Average max. and min. temperatures in °C
- █ Precipitation totals in mm
- Source: Environment and Climate Change Canada
Imperial conversion
| J | F | M | A | M | J | J | A | S | O | N | D |
| 3.8 25 5 | 2.9 28 7 | 3.7 37 18 | 3.4 50 30 | 3.8 64 40 | 3.2 73 49 | 3.5 78 55 | 3.4 77 54 | 3.4 68 45 | 3.5 56 35 | 4.2 43 27 | 3.7 31 13 |
- █ Average max. and min. temperatures in °F
- █ Precipitation totals in inches

Fredericton has a warm-summer humid continental climate (Dfb under the Köppen climate classification system), with short, warm summers and long, cold winters. The city has high humidity and precipitation year-round; on average, Fredericton receives approximately 1,100 mm (43 in) of precipitation per year.

Climate data for Fredericton CDA Climate ID: 8101600; coordinates 45°55′N 66°37′W; elevation: 39.6 m (130 ft); 1991–2020 normals, extremes 1871–present (Note: Extreme high and low temperatures in the table below are from Fredericton UNB (December 1871 to July 1913) and Fredericton CDA (August 1913 to present).)
| Month | Jan | Feb | Mar | Apr | May | Jun | Jul | Aug | Sep | Oct | Nov | Dec | Year |
|---|---|---|---|---|---|---|---|---|---|---|---|---|---|
| Record high °C (°F) | 15.0 (59.0) | 19.0 (66.2) | 26.5 (79.7) | 30.5 (86.9) | 35.5 (95.9) | 35.6 (96.1) | 36.1 (97.0) | 38.9 (102.0) | 33.7 (92.7) | 28.9 (84.0) | 21.7 (71.1) | 16.1 (61.0) | 38.9 (102.0) |
| Mean daily maximum °C (°F) | −3.8 (25.2) | −2.3 (27.9) | 3.3 (37.9) | 10.2 (50.4) | 17.6 (63.7) | 22.8 (73.0) | 25.9 (78.6) | 25.3 (77.5) | 20.7 (69.3) | 13.5 (56.3) | 6.3 (43.3) | −0.3 (31.5) | 11.6 (52.9) |
| Daily mean °C (°F) | −9.2 (15.4) | −8.1 (17.4) | −2.1 (28.2) | 4.6 (40.3) | 11.2 (52.2) | 16.4 (61.5) | 19.7 (67.5) | 18.9 (66.0) | 14.2 (57.6) | 7.7 (45.9) | 1.7 (35.1) | −5.0 (23.0) | 5.8 (42.5) |
| Mean daily minimum °C (°F) | −14.6 (5.7) | −13.9 (7.0) | −7.8 (18.0) | −1.1 (30.0) | 4.7 (40.5) | 9.9 (49.8) | 13.4 (56.1) | 12.3 (54.1) | 7.6 (45.7) | 1.9 (35.4) | −2.9 (26.8) | −9.6 (14.7) | 0.0 (32.0) |
| Record low °C (°F) | −38.9 (−38.0) | −38.3 (−36.9) | −32.8 (−27.0) | −20.0 (−4.0) | −6.7 (19.9) | −2.2 (28.0) | 1.7 (35.1) | 1.7 (35.1) | −4.4 (24.1) | −11.1 (12.0) | −26.7 (−16.1) | −35.6 (−32.1) | −38.9 (−38.0) |
| Average precipitation mm (inches) | 101.9 (4.01) | 70.1 (2.76) | 90.1 (3.55) | 81.6 (3.21) | 103.8 (4.09) | 86.3 (3.40) | 89.0 (3.50) | 85.9 (3.38) | 94.7 (3.73) | 89.7 (3.53) | 109.9 (4.33) | 91.8 (3.61) | 1,094.7 (43.10) |
| Average rainfall mm (inches) | 42.4 (1.67) | 31.7 (1.25) | 45.2 (1.78) | 68.1 (2.68) | 103.1 (4.06) | 86.3 (3.40) | 89.0 (3.50) | 85.9 (3.38) | 94.7 (3.73) | 89.3 (3.52) | 96.3 (3.79) | 54.0 (2.13) | 885.9 (34.88) |
| Average snowfall cm (inches) | 63.6 (25.0) | 39.1 (15.4) | 42.4 (16.7) | 13.5 (5.3) | 0.6 (0.2) | 0.0 (0.0) | 0.0 (0.0) | 0.0 (0.0) | 0.0 (0.0) | 0.4 (0.2) | 13.9 (5.5) | 41.4 (16.3) | 214.8 (84.6) |
| Average precipitation days (≥ 0.2 mm) | 12.6 | 10.2 | 12.4 | 12.6 | 14.9 | 13.6 | 14.5 | 12.7 | 13.7 | 13.5 | 13.8 | 12.5 | 156.7 |
| Average rainy days (≥ 0.2 mm) | 4.5 | 4.2 | 7.1 | 10.8 | 14.8 | 13.6 | 14.5 | 12.7 | 13.7 | 13.5 | 11.7 | 6.0 | 126.9 |
| Average snowy days (≥ 0.2 cm) | 9.4 | 7.2 | 7.0 | 2.4 | 0.3 | 0.0 | 0.0 | 0.0 | 0.0 | 0.11 | 3.2 | 7.5 | 37.0 |
| Mean monthly sunshine hours | 119.5 | 130.8 | 148.9 | 162.2 | 206.9 | 224.3 | 239.7 | 226.2 | 172.4 | 142.5 | 95.8 | 102.2 | 1,971.2 |
| Percentage possible sunshine | 42.4 | 44.8 | 40.4 | 40.0 | 44.7 | 47.7 | 50.4 | 51.6 | 45.7 | 41.9 | 33.6 | 37.8 | 43.4 |
Source: Environment and Climate Change Canada

Climate data for Fredericton (Fredericton Airport) Climate ID: 8101600; coordinates 45°52′19.67″N 66°31′40.411″W; elevation: 20.7 m (68 ft); 1991–2020 normals, extremes 1951–present
| Month | Jan | Feb | Mar | Apr | May | Jun | Jul | Aug | Sep | Oct | Nov | Dec | Year |
|---|---|---|---|---|---|---|---|---|---|---|---|---|---|
| Record high humidex | 17.1 | 17.3 | 28.0 | 33.3 | 38.1 | 43.5 | 44.5 | 43.3 | 39.6 | 32.0 | 25.0 | 20.3 | 44.5 |
| Record high °C (°F) | 14.6 (58.3) | 18.6 (65.5) | 27.2 (81.0) | 30.3 (86.5) | 35.2 (95.4) | 36.4 (97.5) | 36.7 (98.1) | 37.2 (99.0) | 34.1 (93.4) | 28.7 (83.7) | 24.3 (75.7) | 17.1 (62.8) | 37.2 (99.0) |
| Mean maximum °C (°F) | 9.1 (48.4) | 8.0 (46.4) | 12.7 (54.9) | 21.5 (70.7) | 28.3 (82.9) | 31.8 (89.2) | 32.2 (90.0) | 31.9 (89.4) | 29.3 (84.7) | 22.8 (73.0) | 17.2 (63.0) | 11.7 (53.1) | 33.9 (93.0) |
| Mean daily maximum °C (°F) | −3.8 (25.2) | −2.3 (27.9) | 3.3 (37.9) | 10.2 (50.4) | 17.6 (63.7) | 22.8 (73.0) | 25.9 (78.6) | 25.3 (77.5) | 20.7 (69.3) | 13.5 (56.3) | 6.3 (43.3) | −0.3 (31.5) | 11.6 (52.9) |
| Daily mean °C (°F) | −9.2 (15.4) | −8.1 (17.4) | −2.1 (28.2) | 4.6 (40.3) | 11.2 (52.2) | 16.4 (61.5) | 19.7 (67.5) | 18.9 (66.0) | 14.2 (57.6) | 7.7 (45.9) | 1.7 (35.1) | −5.0 (23.0) | 5.8 (42.4) |
| Mean daily minimum °C (°F) | −14.6 (5.7) | −13.9 (7.0) | −7.8 (18.0) | −1.1 (30.0) | 4.7 (40.5) | 9.9 (49.8) | 13.4 (56.1) | 12.3 (54.1) | 7.6 (45.7) | 1.9 (35.4) | −2.9 (26.8) | −9.6 (14.7) | 0.0 (32.0) |
| Mean minimum °C (°F) | −26.8 (−16.2) | −25.7 (−14.3) | −20.2 (−4.4) | −7.9 (17.8) | −1.4 (29.5) | 2.9 (37.2) | 7.4 (45.3) | 5.3 (41.5) | −0.9 (30.4) | −5.6 (21.9) | −12.4 (9.7) | −21.2 (−6.2) | −28.1 (−18.6) |
| Record low °C (°F) | −35.6 (−32.1) | −37.2 (−35.0) | −28.9 (−20.0) | −18.4 (−1.1) | −6.7 (19.9) | −0.6 (30.9) | 1.7 (35.1) | 1.3 (34.3) | −3.9 (25.0) | −9.1 (15.6) | −20.2 (−4.4) | −33.8 (−28.8) | −37.2 (−35.0) |
| Record low wind chill | −45.1 | −46.4 | −38.0 | −26.1 | −12.5 | −4.3 | 0.0 | 0.0 | −6.7 | −13.1 | −26.5 | −42.2 | −46.4 |
| Average precipitation mm (inches) | 85.8 (3.38) | 63.2 (2.49) | 87.9 (3.46) | 77.3 (3.04) | 79.3 (3.12) | 83.1 (3.27) | 93.9 (3.70) | 66.4 (2.61) | 89.6 (3.53) | 106.3 (4.19) | 96.8 (3.81) | 92.9 (3.66) | 1,022.3 (40.25) |
| Average rainfall mm (inches) | 40.8 (1.61) | 29.7 (1.17) | 54.4 (2.14) | 65.6 (2.58) | 81.1 (3.19) | 75.3 (2.96) | 90.6 (3.57) | 68.0 (2.68) | 86.5 (3.41) | 109.4 (4.31) | 92.7 (3.65) | 56.9 (2.24) | 851.0 (33.50) |
| Average snowfall cm (inches) | 63.8 (25.1) | 48.6 (19.1) | 46.4 (18.3) | 16.7 (6.6) | 0.6 (0.2) | 0.0 (0.0) | 0.0 (0.0) | 0.0 (0.0) | 0.0 (0.0) | 0.7 (0.3) | 12.8 (5.0) | 51.7 (20.4) | 241.3 (95.0) |
| Average precipitation days (≥ 0.2 mm) | 13.1 | 10.5 | 12.3 | 12.6 | 12.7 | 12.2 | 12.2 | 9.7 | 9.5 | 11.5 | 12.2 | 12.8 | 141.2 |
| Average rainy days (≥ 0.2 mm) | 4.9 | 4.1 | 7.1 | 9.9 | 12.7 | 12.2 | 12.3 | 9.6 | 9.4 | 11.1 | 10.4 | 6.4 | 110.0 |
| Average snowy days (≥ 0.2 cm) | 11.6 | 9.4 | 8.1 | 4.2 | 0.11 | 0.0 | 0.0 | 0.0 | 0.0 | 0.26 | 3.4 | 9.3 | 46.3 |
| Average relative humidity (%) | 64.5 | 58.5 | 55.4 | 52.1 | 51.8 | 54.1 | 56.6 | 56.2 | 56.8 | 60.2 | 66.1 | 68.9 | 58.4 |
| Average dew point °C (°F) | −12.8 (9.0) | −12.1 (10.2) | −7.7 (18.1) | −2.0 (28.4) | 4.8 (40.6) | 10.6 (51.1) | 14.5 (58.1) | 14.1 (57.4) | 10.3 (50.5) | 4.0 (39.2) | −1.7 (28.9) | −7.8 (18.0) | 1.3 (34.3) |
Source 1: Environment and Climate Change Canada
Source 2: weatherstats.ca (for dewpoint and monthly&yearly average absolute maximum&minimum temperature)

== Demographics ==
Historical population
| Year | Pop. | ±% |
|---|---|---|
| 1871 | 6,006 | — |
| 1881 | 6,218 | +3.5% |
| 1891 | 6,502 | +4.6% |
| 1901 | 7,117 | +9.5% |
| 1911 | 7,208 | +1.3% |
| 1921 | 8,114 | +12.6% |
| 1931 | 8,830 | +8.8% |
| 1941 | 10,062 | +14.0% |
| 1951 | 16,018 | +59.2% |
| 1956 | 18,303 | +14.3% |
| 1961 | 19,683 | +7.5% |
| 1966 | 22,460 | +14.1% |
| 1971 | 24,254 | +8.0% |
| 1976 | 45,248 | +86.6% |
| 1981 | 43,723 | −3.4% |
| 1986 | 44,352 | +1.4% |
| 1991 | 46,466 | +4.8% |
| 1996 | 46,507 | +0.1% |
| 2001 | 47,580 | +2.3% |
| 2006 | 50,535 | +6.2% |
| 2011 | 56,224 | +11.3% |
| 2016 | 58,721 | +4.4% |
| 2021 | 63,116 | +7.5% |
Boundary changes for 1941 and 1973

In the 2021 Canadian census conducted by Statistics Canada, Fredericton had a population of 63,116 living in 28,478 of its 29,892 total private dwellings, a change of 7.5% from its 2016 population of 58,721. With a land area of 133.93 km^{2} (51.71 sq mi), it had a population density of 471.3/km^{2} (1,220.6/sq mi) in 2021.

At the census metropolitan area (CMA) level in the 2021 census, the Fredericton CMA had a population of 108,610 living in 46,357 of its 48,761 total private dwellings, a change of 5.8% from its 2016 population of 102,690. With a land area of 6,014.66 km^{2} (2,322.27 sq mi), it had a population density of 18.1/km^{2} (46.8/sq mi) in 2021.

The 2021 census reported that immigrants (individuals born outside Canada) comprise 7,790 persons or 12.6% of the total population of Fredericton. Of the total immigrant population, the top countries of origin were United Kingdom (765 persons or 9.8%), China (645 persons or 8.3%), United States of America (570 persons or 7.3%), Syria (505 persons or 6.5%), Philippines (500 persons or 6.4%), India (460 persons or 5.9%), Egypt (300 persons or 3.9%), Iran (245 persons or 3.1%), Lebanon (205 persons or 2.6%), and Democratic Republic of the Congo (180 persons or 2.3%).

=== Ethnicity ===
In 2021, Fredericton was 82.5% white/European, 3.5% Indigenous and 14.0% visible minorities. The largest visible minority groups were Black (2.9%), South Asian (2.9%), Arab (2.5%), Chinese (1.8%) and Filipino (1.0%).

Fredericton accepted the highest number of refugees from the Syrian Civil War per capita of any Canadian city.

Largest ethnic origin in Fredericton CMA by census tract based on the 2021 census

| Ethnic and Cultural origins (2021) | Population | Percent |
|---|---|---|
| Irish | 16,480 | 26.6% |
| English | 15,495 | 25.1% |
| Scottish | 15,340 | 24.8% |
| Canadian | 9,435 | 15.3% |
| French n.o.s | 7,950 | 12.9% |
| German | 3,590 | 5.8% |
| Acadian | 3,520 | 5.7% |
| Caucasian (White) n.o.s+ European n.o.s | 3,350 | 5.4% |
| British Isles n.o.s | 2,300 | 3.7% |
| Welsh | 1,845 | 3.0% |
| Dutch | 1,795 | 2.9% |
| First Nations (North American Indian) n.o.s.+ North American Indigenous, n.o.s. | 1,425 | 2.3% |
| New Brunswicker | 1,310 | 2.1% |
| Chinese | 1,220 | 2.0% |
Note: a person may report more than one ethnic origin.

Panethnic groups in the City of Fredericton (2001−2021)
| Panethnic group | 2021 | | 2016 | | 2011 | | 2006 | | 2001 | |
| Panethnic group | Pop. | % | Pop. | % | Pop. | % | Pop. | % | Pop. | % |
|---|---|---|---|---|---|---|---|---|---|---|
| European (Note: Statistic includes all persons that did not make up part of a visible minority or an indigenous identity.) | 50,995 | 82.47% | 49,320 | 86.54% | 49,810 | 90.33% | 45,885 | 91.81% | 44,230 | 94.11% |
| Indigenous | 2,180 | 3.53% | 1,830 | 3.21% | 1,450 | 2.63% | 725 | 1.45% | 700 | 1.49% |
| Middle Eastern (Note: Statistic includes total responses of "West Asian" and "Arab" under visible minority section on census.) | 1,995 | 3.23% | 1,185 | 2.08% | 385 | 0.7% | 365 | 0.73% | 370 | 0.79% |
| African | 1,780 | 2.88% | 985 | 1.73% | 655 | 1.19% | 860 | 1.72% | 470 | 1% |
| South Asian | 1,775 | 2.87% | 920 | 1.61% | 875 | 1.59% | 635 | 1.27% | 425 | 0.9% |
| East Asian (Note: Statistic includes total responses of "Chinese", "Korean", and "Japanese" under visible minority section on census.) | 1,410 | 2.28% | 1,645 | 2.89% | 1,375 | 2.49% | 1,045 | 2.09% | 545 | 1.16% |
| Southeast Asian (Note: Statistic includes total responses of "Filipino" and "Southeast Asian" under visible minority section on census.) | 915 | 1.48% | 505 | 0.89% | 150 | 0.27% | 175 | 0.35% | 160 | 0.34% |
| Latin American | 520 | 0.84% | 310 | 0.54% | 350 | 0.63% | 170 | 0.34% | 40 | 0.09% |
| Other/multiracial (Note: Statistic includes total responses of "Visible minority, n.i.e." and "Multiple visible minorities" under visible minority section on census.) | 270 | 0.44% | 290 | 0.51% | 80 | 0.15% | 115 | 0.23% | 60 | 0.13% |
| Total responses | 61,835 | 97.97% | 56,990 | 97.05% | 55,145 | 98.08% | 49,980 | 98.9% | 47,000 | 98.78% |
| Total population | 63,116 | 100% | 58,721 | 100% | 56,224 | 100% | 50,535 | 100% | 47,580 | 100% |
Note: Totals greater than 100% due to multiple origin responses

=== Language ===
English is spoken as a mother tongue by 80.2% of residents. Other mother tongues spoken are French (6.1%), Arabic (2.1%), Chinese languages (1.4%), Spanish (0.7%), Russian (0.6%), and Persian languages (0.5%). 1.4% of the population listed both English and French as mother tongues.

=== Religion ===
According to the 2021 census, religious groups in Fredericton included:

- Christianity (32,295 persons or 52.2%)
- Irreligion (25,150 persons or 40.7%)
- Islam (2,305 persons or 3.7%)
- Hinduism (820 persons or 1.3%)
- Buddhism (225 persons or 0.4%)
- Sikhism (190 persons or 0.3%)
- Judaism (160 persons or 0.3%)
- Indigenous Spirituality (15 persons or <0.1%)
- Other (670 persons or 1.1%)

Those who declare a religion are predominantly Protestant. Fredericton has a synagogue, a mosque, a Hindu temple, a Unitarian fellowship, and a Shambhala Buddhist meditation centre.

| Religion | 2011 (%) | 2011 (Total) |
|---|---|---|
| No religion | 26.2% | 14,460 |
| Catholic | 24.9% | 13,740 |
| Baptist | 11.4% | 6,290 |
| United Church | 10.9% | 5,995 |
| Anglican | 9.4% | 5,160 |
| Pentecostal | 2.5% | 1,390 |

== Economy ==
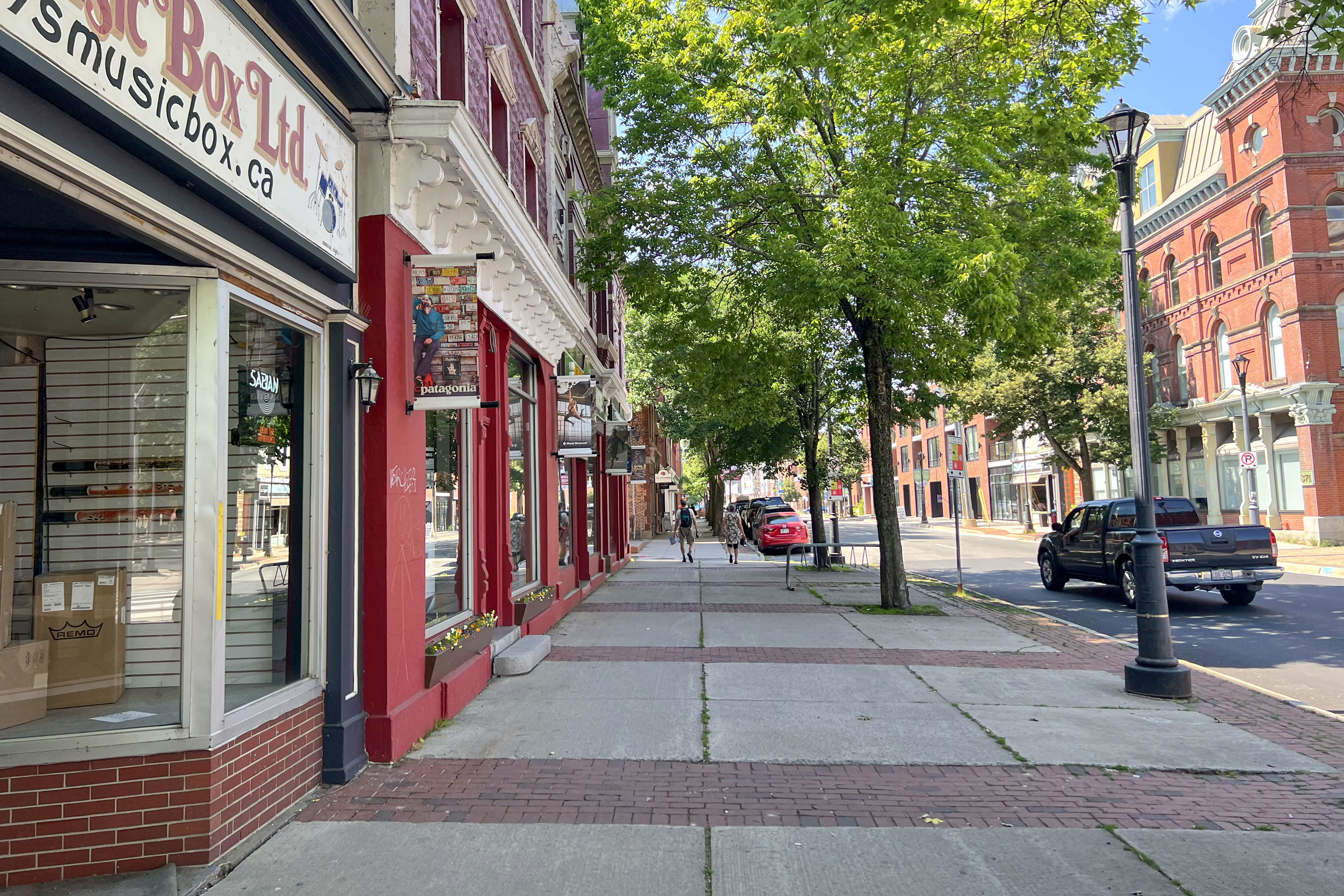
Queen Street

The Government of New Brunswick and the universities are the primary employers. The policies of centralizing provincial government functions during the 1960s led to an expansion of the population.

The 1960s also saw an expansion of the University of New Brunswick due to increased post-war university enrolment, as well as the construction of Saint Thomas University. The Law School, now the University of New Brunswick Faculty of Law moved from Saint John to the Fredericton area.

The city has been investing actively in IT infrastructure. The City of Fredericton won the "Judges Innovation Award" at the 2004 Canadian Information Productivity Awards due to their "Fred-eZone" free municipality wide Wi-Fi initiative. This and other innovations by the city's utelco, e-Novations, led Intel to do a case study on their successes. Fred-eZone spans much of the city's downtown and parts of surrounding residential areas, as well as peripheral commercial areas such as Fredericton's Regent Mall. In 2008 and 2009 the Intelligent Community Forum selected Fredericton as a Top 7 Intelligent Community, based partly on the city's work in the IT sector.

=== Downtown Fredericton ===
Downtown Fredericton is generally considered to be the area bordered by the St. John River to the north, Smythe Street to the west, Church Street to the east and Brunswick Street to the south.

The downtown contains Kings Place Mall, a mixed-use office and retail complex that also serves as a major transfer point for Fredericton Transit.

Downtown Fredericton Inc. (DFI) is a non-profit Business Improvement Area (BIA) organization representing the central business district. It administers programs aimed at supporting revitalization, promotion and the commercial viability of the downtown in cooperation with private and public sector partners. In 2016, DFI received the Downtown Achievement Award of Excellence from the International Downtown Association for a local awareness marketing campaign. The campaign featured local entrepreneur Jessie Yerxa and was created by Fredericton agency Ginger.

== Arts and culture ==
The Playhouse is the main venue for Theatre New Brunswick, the province's largest professional theatre company.

Festivals include the Harvest Jazz & Blues Festival, the New Brunswick Summer Music Festival, the Silver Wave Film Festival, the Flourish Arts & Music Festival, and Symphony New Brunswick.

Fredericton has a long literary tradition, having been home to Jonathan Odell, Charles G. D. Roberts, Bliss Carman, and Francis Sherman. Writers living in Fredericton include Raymond Fraser, Herb Curtis, David Adams Richards, Mark Anthony Jarman, and Gerard Beirne.

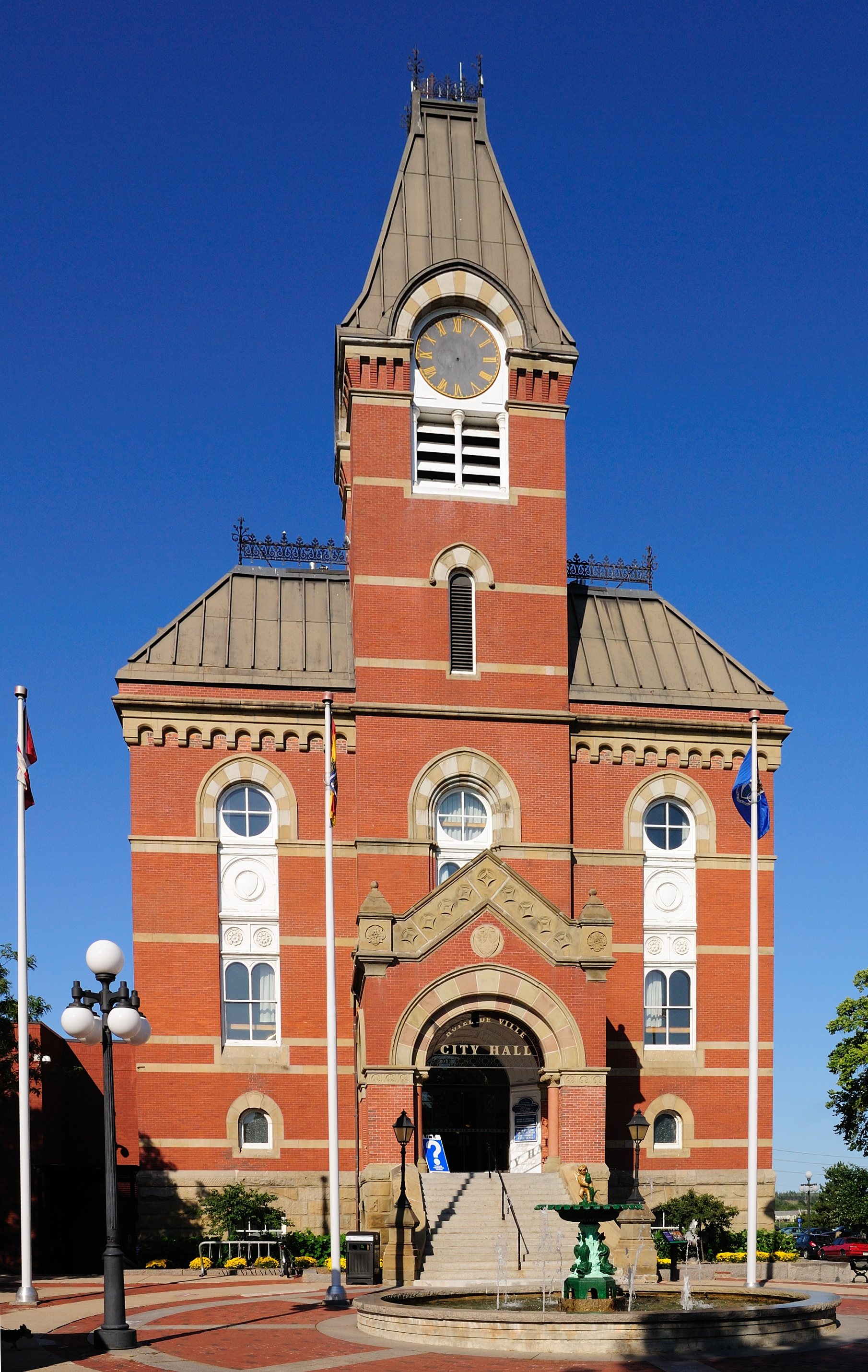
Fredericton's City Hall where "Freddy the Nude Dude" resides.

Fredericton's beloved fountain "Freddy the Nude Dude", officially known as "Putto with Fish" sits outside City Hall at 397 Queen St. "Freddy the Nude Dude" was donated to the city by Mayor George Edward Fentey, in 1885. The statue depicts a nude Cherub and is a beloved fixture of downtown Fredericton. The famed statue has had some trouble since its historic arrival in 1885. In January 2013, "Freddy the Nude Dude" was taken south to Alabama for a replication of the original statue after 128 winters worth of damage. The original Freddy is kept safely inside City Hall where it is protected from further weather damage.

=== Architecture ===
Styles range from Victorian to modern. There are 12 National Historic Sites in the city, beyond the dozen National Historic People and two National Historic Events honoured there.

=== Museums and historic buildings ===
- Beaverbrook Art Gallery
- New Brunswick Legislative Building
- Old Government House
- Fredericton Region Museum
- Hartt Boot & Shoe Company Ltd. Factory (The Hartt Shoe Company)
- Christ Church Cathedral
- New Brunswick Sports Hall of Fame
- Science East
- Sir Howard Douglas Hall (Old Arts Building)
- William Brydone Jack Observatory
- St. Anne's Chapel
- Fort Nashwaak
- Fredericton City Hall
- Marysville Cotton Mill
- Centennial Building
- Lord Beaverbrook Hotel

== Sports ==
There are no professional sports teams in Fredericton, although both universities have extensive athletic programs. The UNB Reds play in the Atlantic University Sport conference of U Sports and St. Thomas Tommies play in the Atlantic Collegiate Athletic Association conference of the Canadian Collegiate Athletic Association for most sports, although their women's hockey team, cross-country teams, and track & field teams play in the Atlantic University Sports conference of U Sports.

Fredericton's high schools compete in a variety of sports in the New Brunswick Interscholastic Athletic Association.

UNB's men's hockey team are 10-time National Champions, and the highest attended sporting events in the city.

The Junior A hockey team is the Fredericton Red Wings. The former Fredericton Express and Fredericton Canadiens were American Hockey League teams.

Each summer the Fredericton Loyalists host the New Brunswick Timber team which competes in the Rugby Canada Super League.

Fredericton often holds high class curling competitions.

== Parks and recreation ==
- Carleton Park, part of the Northside Riverfront Trail, includes a boat launching area. The park was once the site of Alexander "Boss" Gibson's rail yard.
- The Green, along the north and south banks of the Saint John River, a walking and biking trail.
- Killarney Lake Park, a lakeside park with a beach and picnic spots as well as an extensive network of cross-country skiing trails.
- Odell Park features preserved forested areas, trails, spaces for picnics and gatherings, and the Fredericton Botanic Garden
- Officers' Square is a venue for outdoor concerts and has an outdoor skating rink in the winter.
- Queen Square Park, in the heart of Downtown Fredericton.
- Reading Park (/ˈrɛdɪŋ/ RED-ing) is a 130,000 m^{2} (33 acres) passive use park incorporating an open meadow, and a 1.1 km (0.68 mi) walking trail through an old-growth forest. The park's old-growth forest is one of the city's last remaining habitats for the pileated woodpecker.
- Wilmot Park – a recreational park downtown.

=== Trail system ===
Fredericton has a network of 25 trails totaling more than 85 km (53 mi) on both sides of the Saint John and Nashwaak Rivers. Many of the city trails are rail trails that follow old railway lines. These include the Fredericton Railway Bridge that spans 0.6 km (0.37 mi) across the Saint John River. The rail trail system in Fredericton is part of the Sentier NB Trail system and some of these trails are also part of the larger Trans-Canada Trail network.

== Government ==
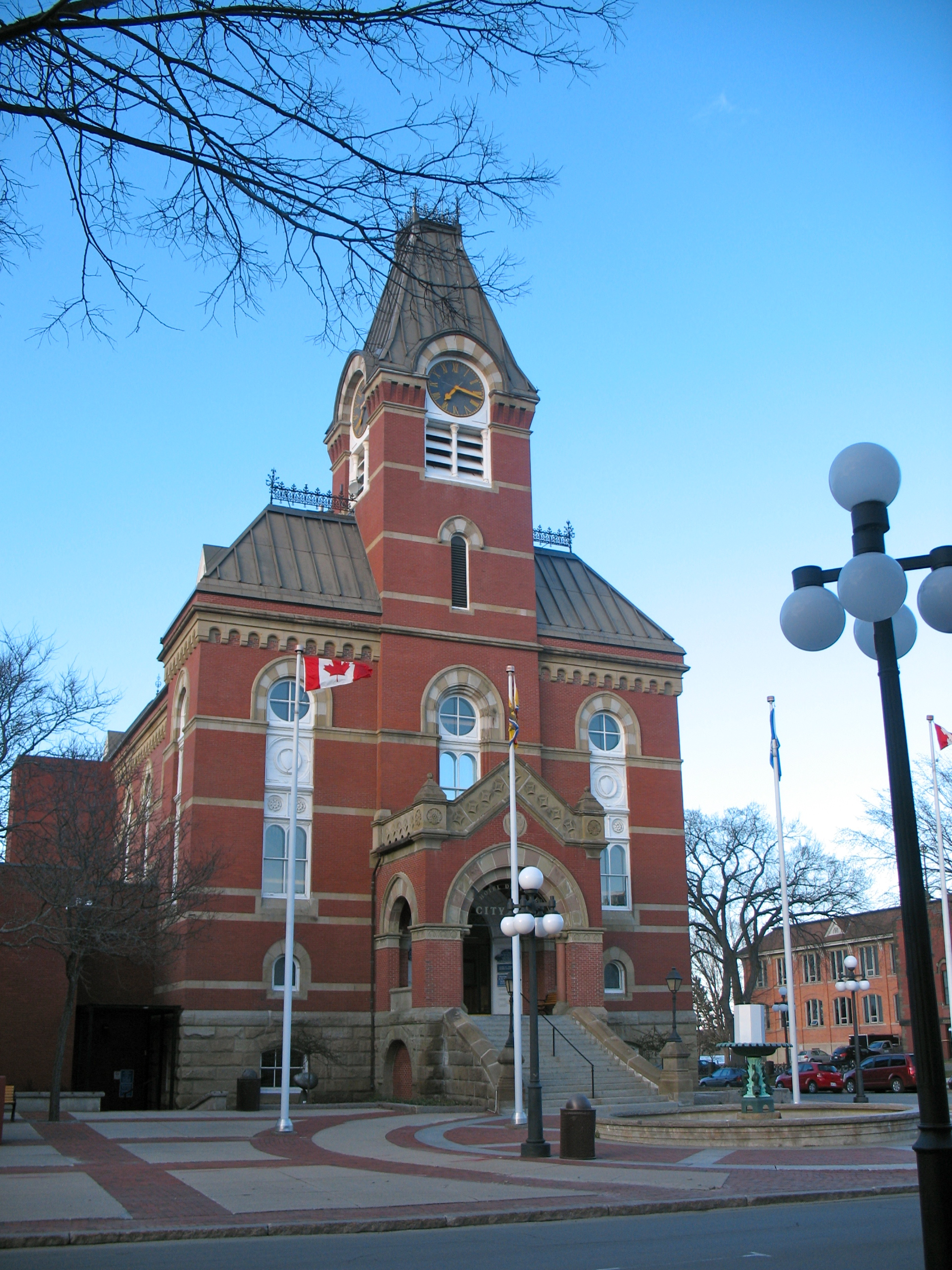
Fredericton City Hall is the seat of municipal government.

Fredericton has a non-partisan and Mayor–council government. The mayor and council serve four-year terms with elections in May. The city is divided into 12 wards, six on each side of the river, with one councillor per ward.

The city includes the provincial ridings of Fredericton North, Fredericton-Grand Lake, Fredericton West-Hanwell, Oromocto-Lincoln-Fredericton, New Maryland-Sunbury and Fredericton South, which in 2014 elected the first-ever MLA for the Green Party of New Brunswick, party leader David Coon.

Federally, the city forms most of the riding of Fredericton.

== Emergency services and police ==
Fredericton Police is responsible for policing in the city and has 115 sworn members (as of 2012); The force was founded in 1851.

Fredericton Fire Department has 4 stations providing fire suppression in the city

Emergency Medical Services in Fredericton are provided by Ambulance New Brunswick, the provincial ambulance service.

== Education and research ==
The Anglophone West School District and the District Scolaire Francophone Sud (District 1) run schools including Fredericton High School, École des Bâtisseurs, and the École Sainte-Anne. Leo Hayes High School is a public–private partnership

There are two universities, the University of New Brunswick, and St. Thomas, the province's only Catholic university.

Colleges include the New Brunswick College of Craft and Design, the New Brunswick Community College, and the Maritime College of Forest Technology.

For-profit universities include University of Fredericton and Yorkville University.

The Hugh John Flemming Forestry Centre researches in forestry management. Fredericton's Provincial Research Organization specializes in aquaculture, mining, manufacturing, energy and the environment.

== Transportation ==
Air service is provided out of the Fredericton International Airport.

Fredericton Transit provides bus service 7 days a week.

Passenger rail service ended in the 1960s, and freight in 1996. All railway tracks have been abandoned and removed, largely becoming multi-use trails.

Fredericton started installing bicycle lanes in July 2008.

Fredericton is served by the Maritime Bus fleet which provides connections to points throughout the Maritimes.

The Trans-Canada Highway passes along the southern municipal boundary. Routes 7 and 8 (the latter being a former alignment of the Trans-Canada) also pass through the city. Two highway bridges, the Westmorland Street Bridge and the Princess Margaret Bridge, cross the Saint John River. Those bridges feed into controlled-access roads (Routes 8 and 105 serving the city's north side).

== Gallery ==
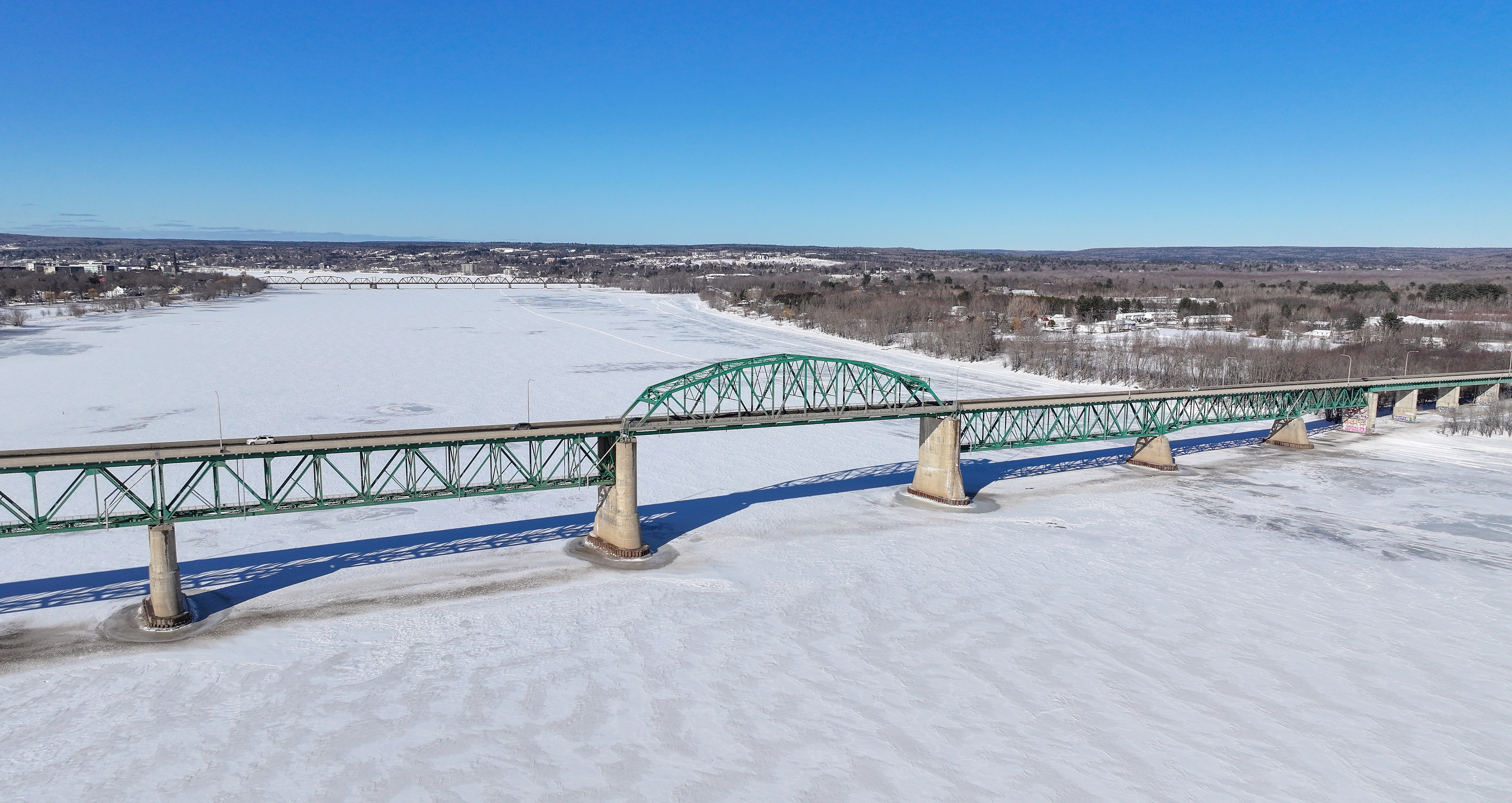
Princess Margaret Bridge

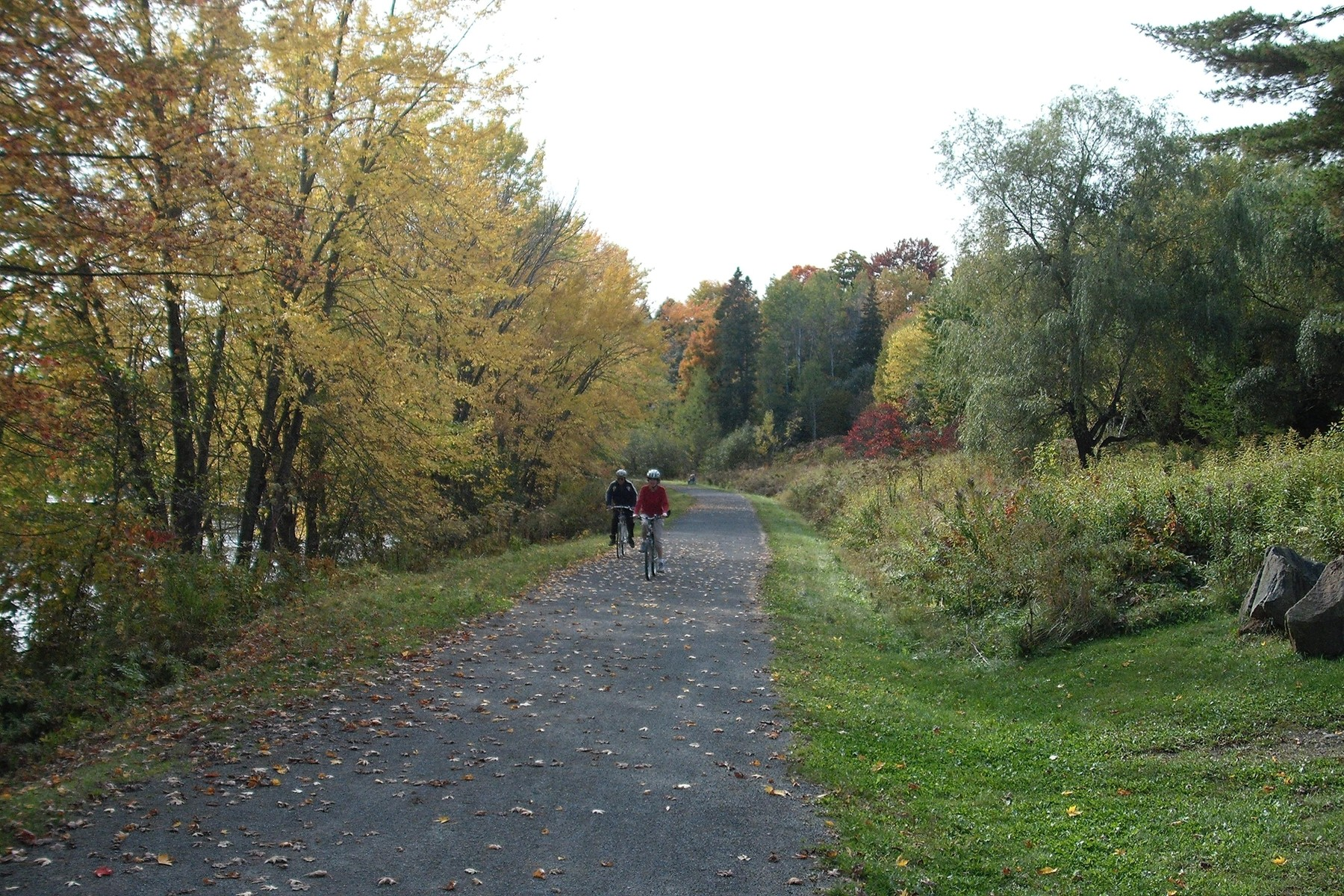
The Nashwaak River Trail

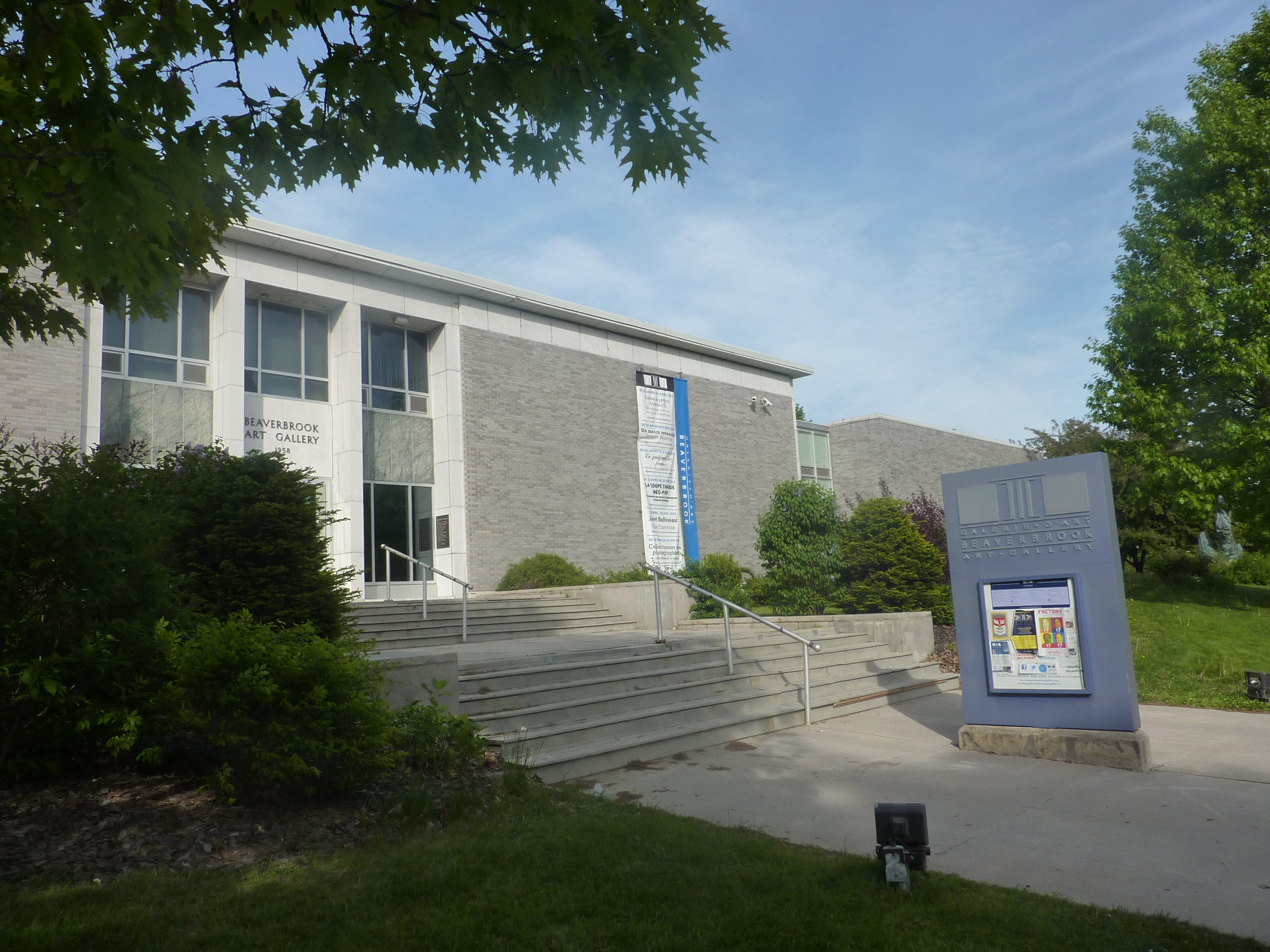
The Beaverbrook Art Gallery, prior to the addition of the Harrison McCain Pavilion in 2022

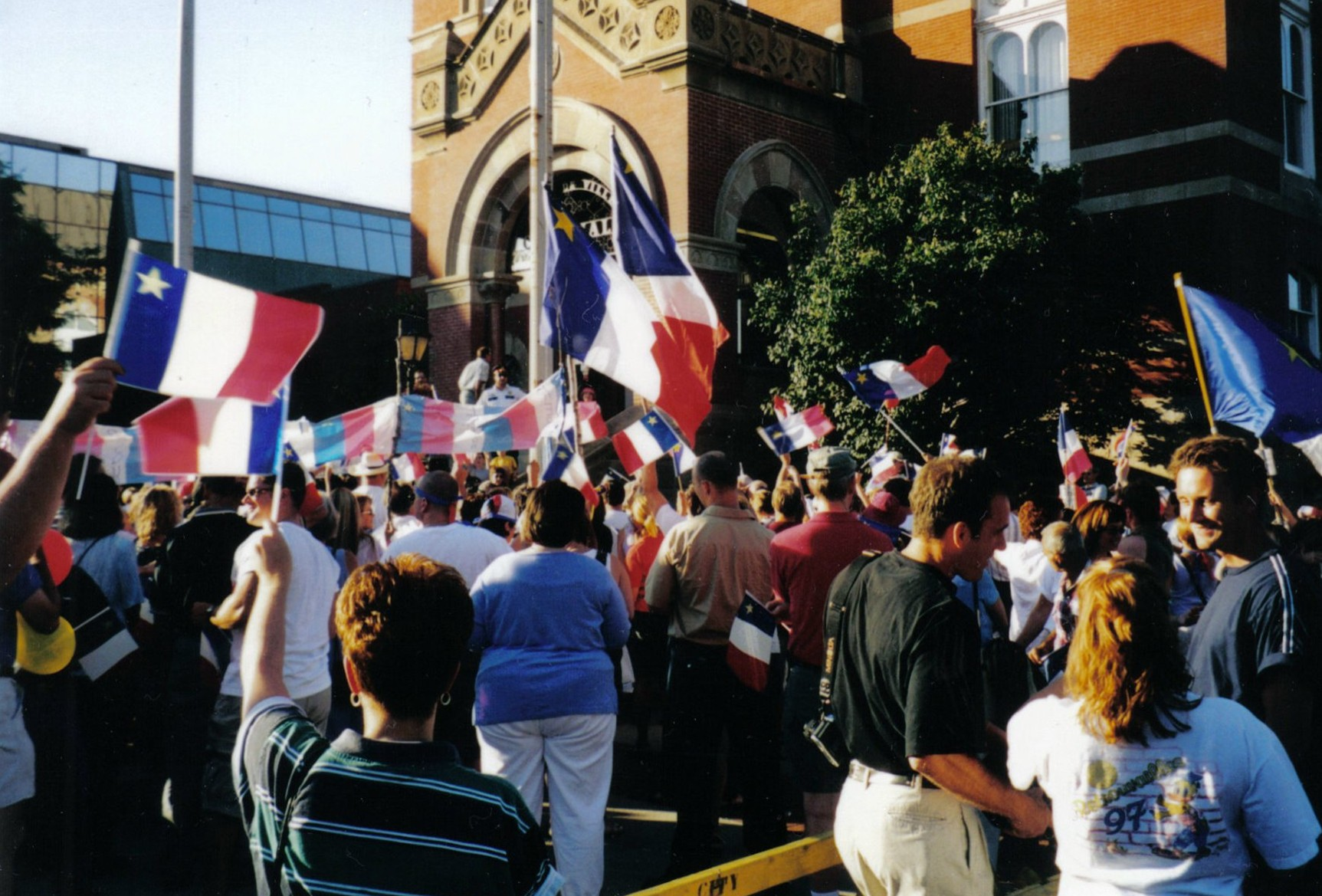
Tintamarre, a Celebration of Acadian culture in Fredericton

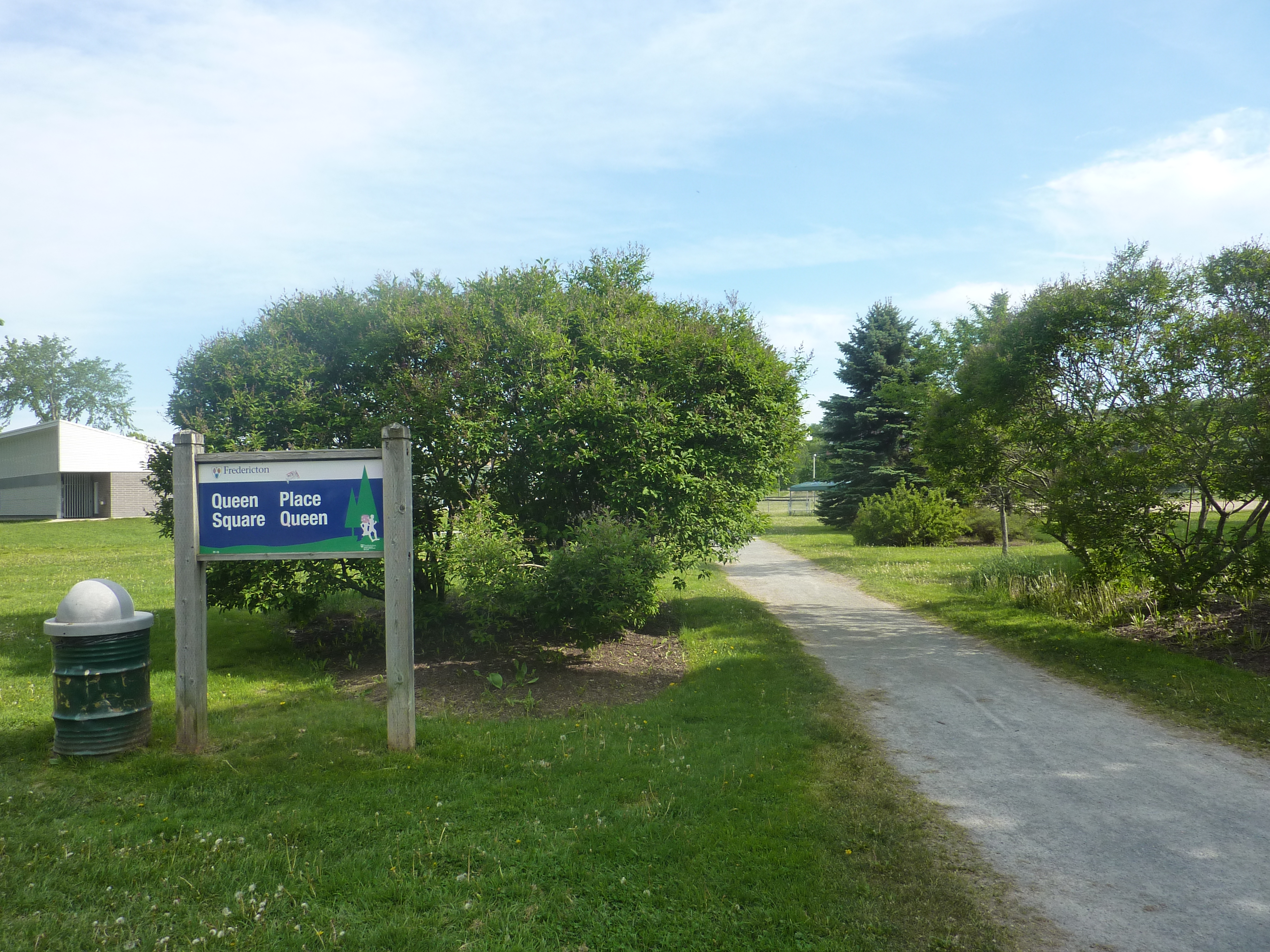
Queen Square Park

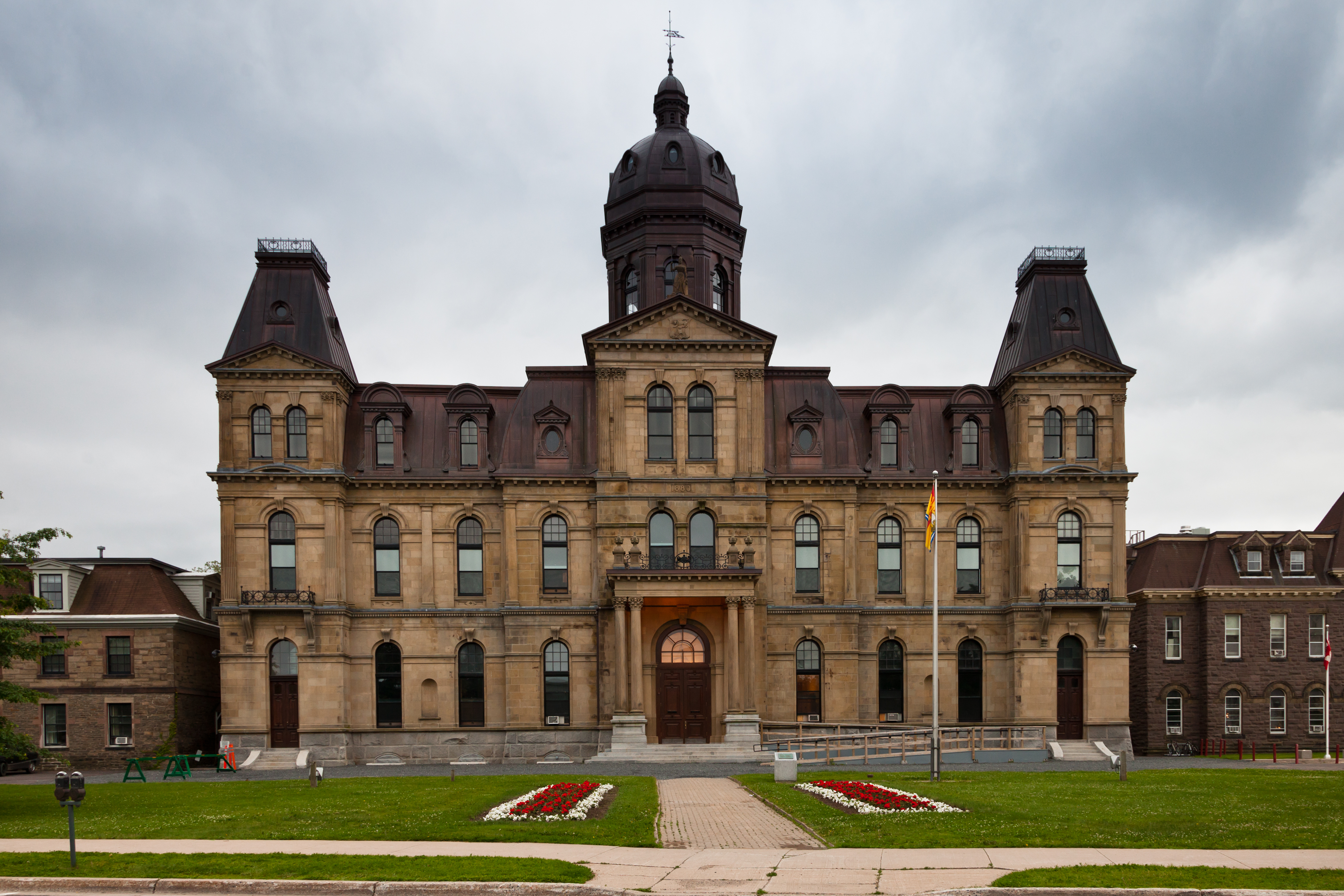
The New Brunswick Legislative Building

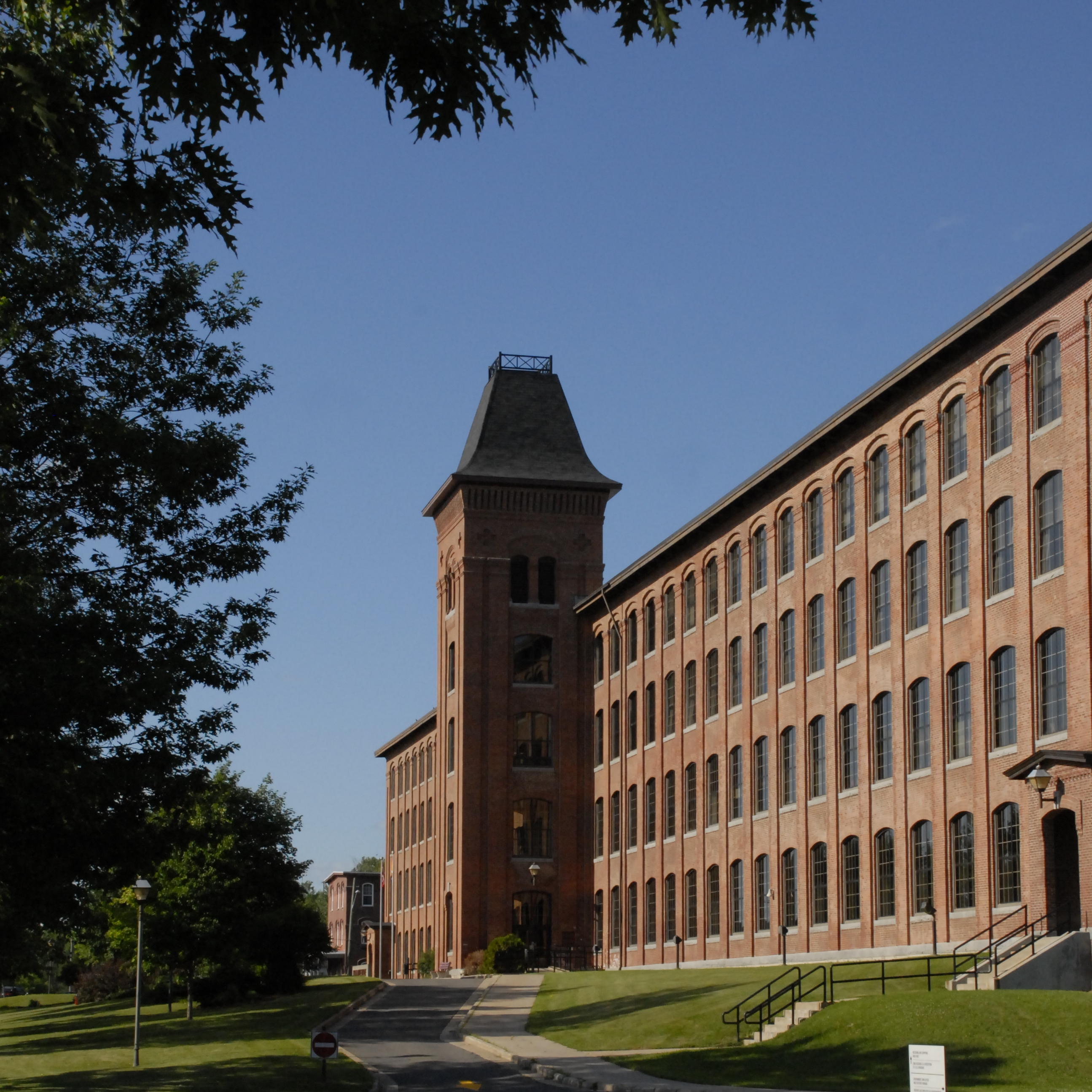
Marysville Place houses a number of offices for the provincial government.

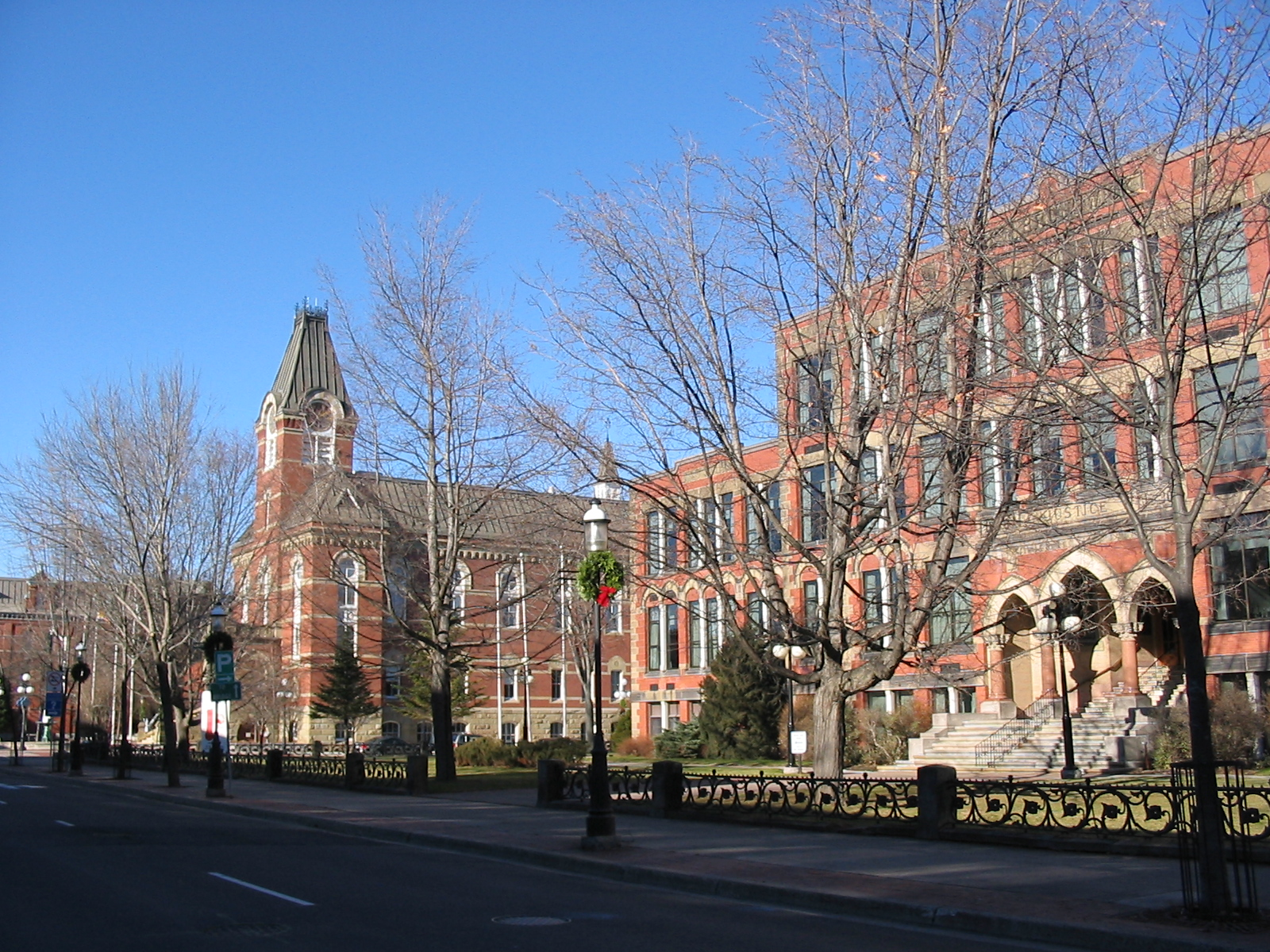
Downtown Fredericton

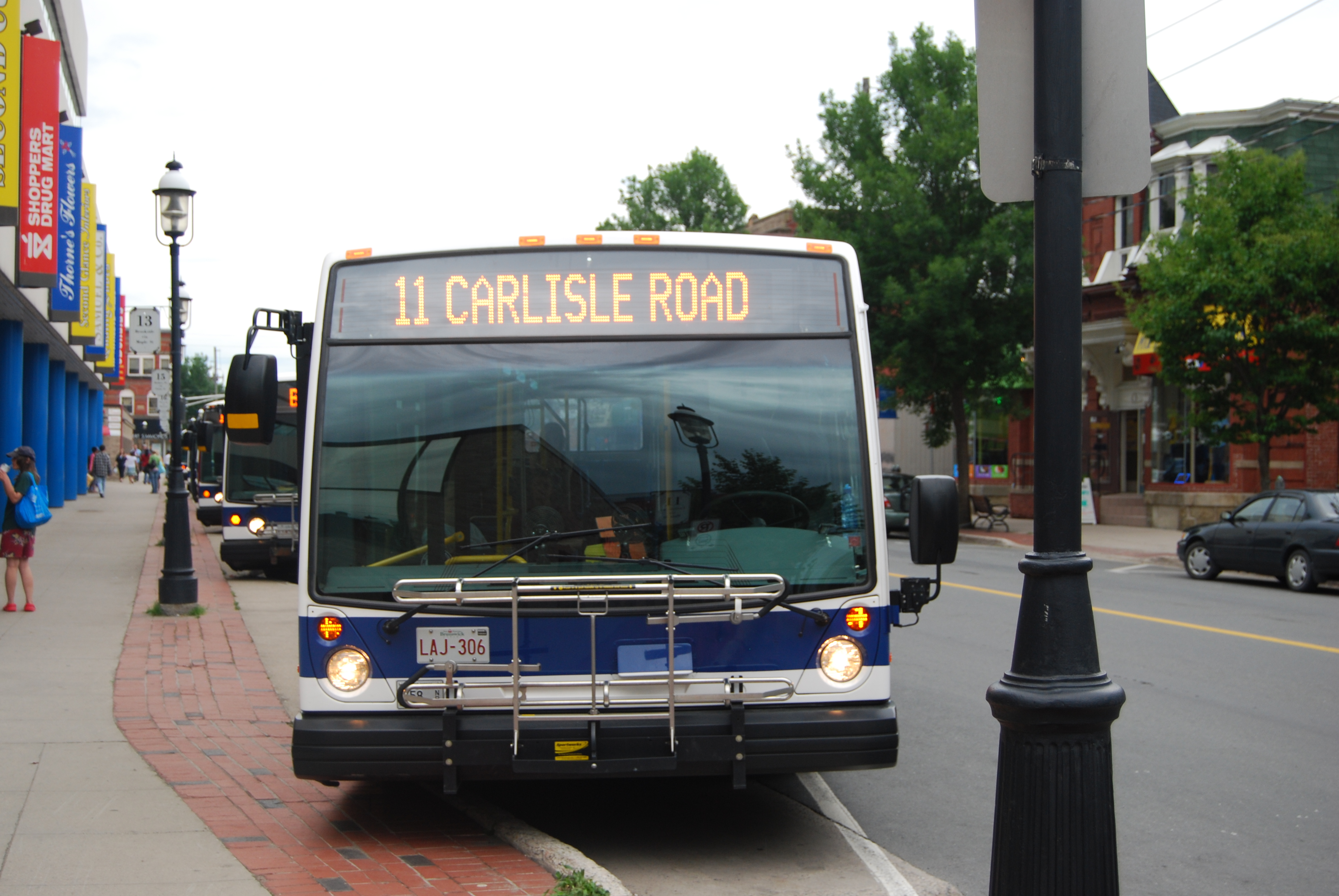
Fredericton Transit bus with bike rack

== See also ==
- People from Fredericton
- Imperial Order Daughters of the Empire (IODE), the first chapter of which was formed in Fredericton on 15 January 1900
- List of cities in Canada
- Royal eponyms in Canada
- Fredericton Cenotaph
- Fredericton Public Library
- Media in Fredericton
- The Playhouse
- Dr. Everett Chalmers Regional Hospital
- Robert Burns Memorial Statue (Fredericton)
- Douglas
- Hanwell
- Marysville
- Nashwaaksis
