= Fredericton Botanic Garden =

Garden in Fredericton, New Brunswick, Canada

Coordinates: 45.95238°N 66.67974°W

The Fredericton Botanic Garden is a 54-acre (22 ha) garden located on hillside backed by Odell Park in Fredericton, New Brunswick, Canada. Its main features include terraces, streams, and springs, and natural habitats for local animals.

== History and activities ==
The garden was established in 1969. It houses the largest collection of rhododendrons in the Province. The collection of Azaleas and perennial beds are recognized throughout the botany community.

The garden also maintains the Fredericton Botanic Garden Fund, which provides educational programming for the community.

The venue also attracts photographers, artists, bird watchers, trailers, and naturalists.
