= Marysville, New Brunswick =

Human settlement in Fredericton, New Brunswick, Canada

Coordinates: 45.979°N 66.590°W

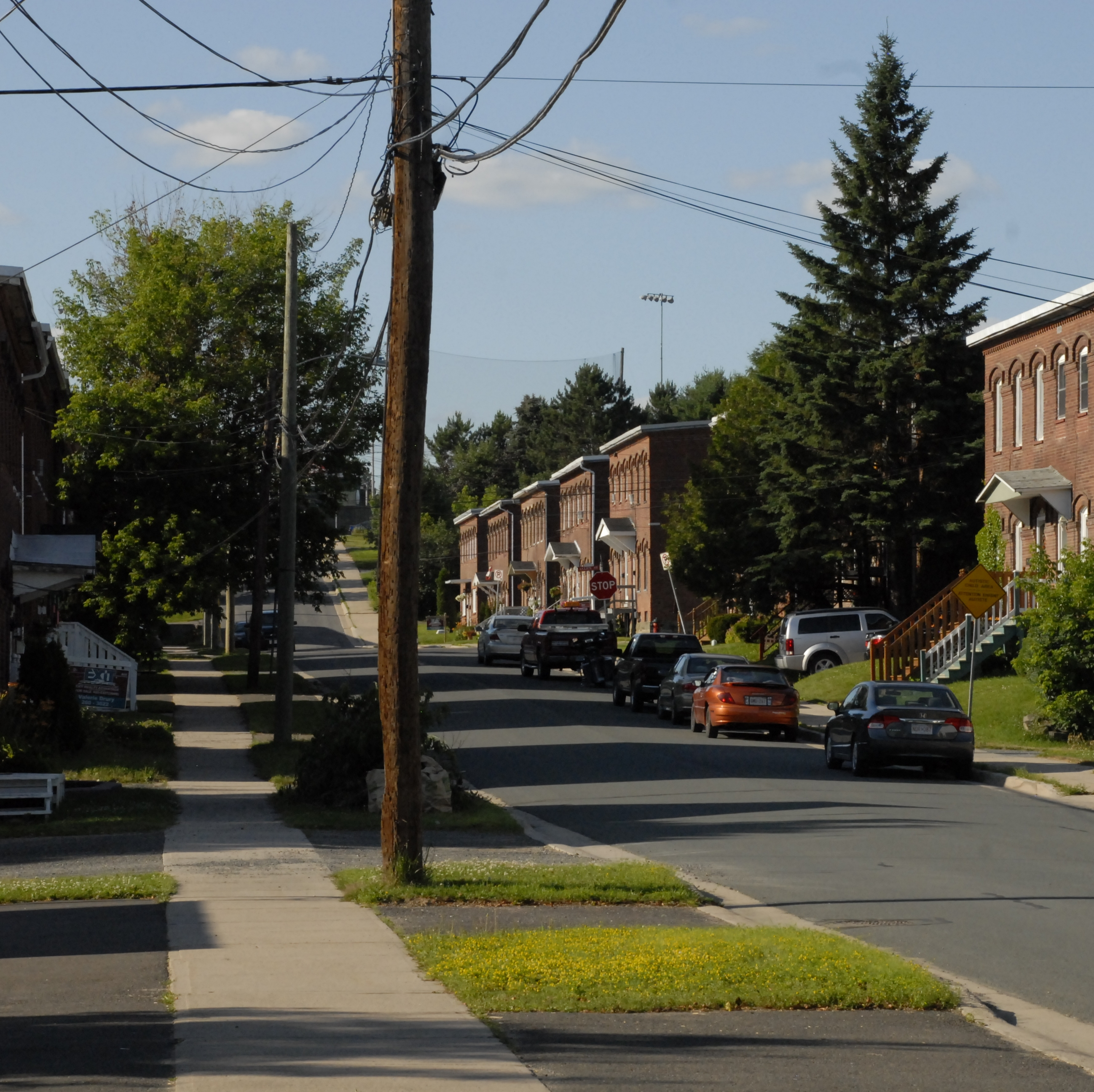
Streetscape, Marysville NB

Marysville is a suburb of Fredericton, New Brunswick, Canada. It is northeast of the city on the Nashwaak River about 5 kilometres (3.1 mi) north of its confluence with the Saint John River.

== History ==
Federal census population history of Marysville
Year	Pop.	±%
1891	1,139	—
1901	1,892	+66.1%
1911	1,837	−2.9%
1921	1,614	−12.1%
1931	1,512	−6.3%
1941	1,651	+9.2%
1951	2,152	+30.3%
1956	2,538	+17.9%
1961	3,233	+27.4%
1966	3,572	+10.5%
1971	3,872	+8.4%
Source: Statistics Canada

There was an Acadian village named Sainte-Marie at the site which was burned in 1758 during the Expulsion of the Acadians. Over a hundred years later the town was incorporated. Alexander Gibson developed the Marysville Cotton Mill. Brick duplexes were built around the mill, most of which are still standing and now privately owned. Gibson named the village after his wife and his eldest daughter, both of whom were named Mary.

In 1973 the town merged with the city of Fredericton. After the cotton mill closed in 1975, the building was renovated and converted into provincial government offices under the name Marysville Place.

Marysville was named a National Historic Site in 1993 for being one of Canada's last intact 19th-century mill towns. According to Parks Canada, it is a rare example of a company town in which both the plant as well as the company-built housing survive until the present day.

== See also ==
- List of people from Fredericton
- List of Neighbourhoods in New Brunswick
