= List of mayors of Fredericton =

This is an incomplete list of mayors of Fredericton, New Brunswick.

== Mayors ==
- John Simpson, Esq. (1848–1853)
- James Scott Beek - three consecutive terms beginning 1859
- William Hayden Needham
- John Adolphus Beckwith (1863–1864)
- Edward Ludlow Wetmore (1874–1876)
- John Douglas Hazen (1888–1889)
- Thomas Carleton Allen (1890–1892)
- John Palmer (1903 - 1907)
- Harry Fulton McLeod (1907–1908)
- Richard Hanson (1918–1920)
- J.A. Reid (1920)
- William George Clark (1925–1935)
- G. Willard Kitchen (1936–1937)
- Ray T. Forbes (1941-1949)
- Henry Stanley Wright (1949–1956)
- William T. Walker (1957–1969)
- Bud Bird (1969–1974)
- Elbridge Wilkins (1974–1986)
- Brad Woodside (1986–1999)
- Walter Brown (interim, 1999)
- Sandy DiGiacinto (1999–2001)
- Les Hull (2001–2004)
- Brad Woodside (2004–2016)
- Mike O'Brien (2016–2021)
- Kate Rogers (2021–2026)
- Steve Hicks (2026–present)
