= Fredericton Cenotaph =

War memorial in Fredericton, New Brunswick, Canada

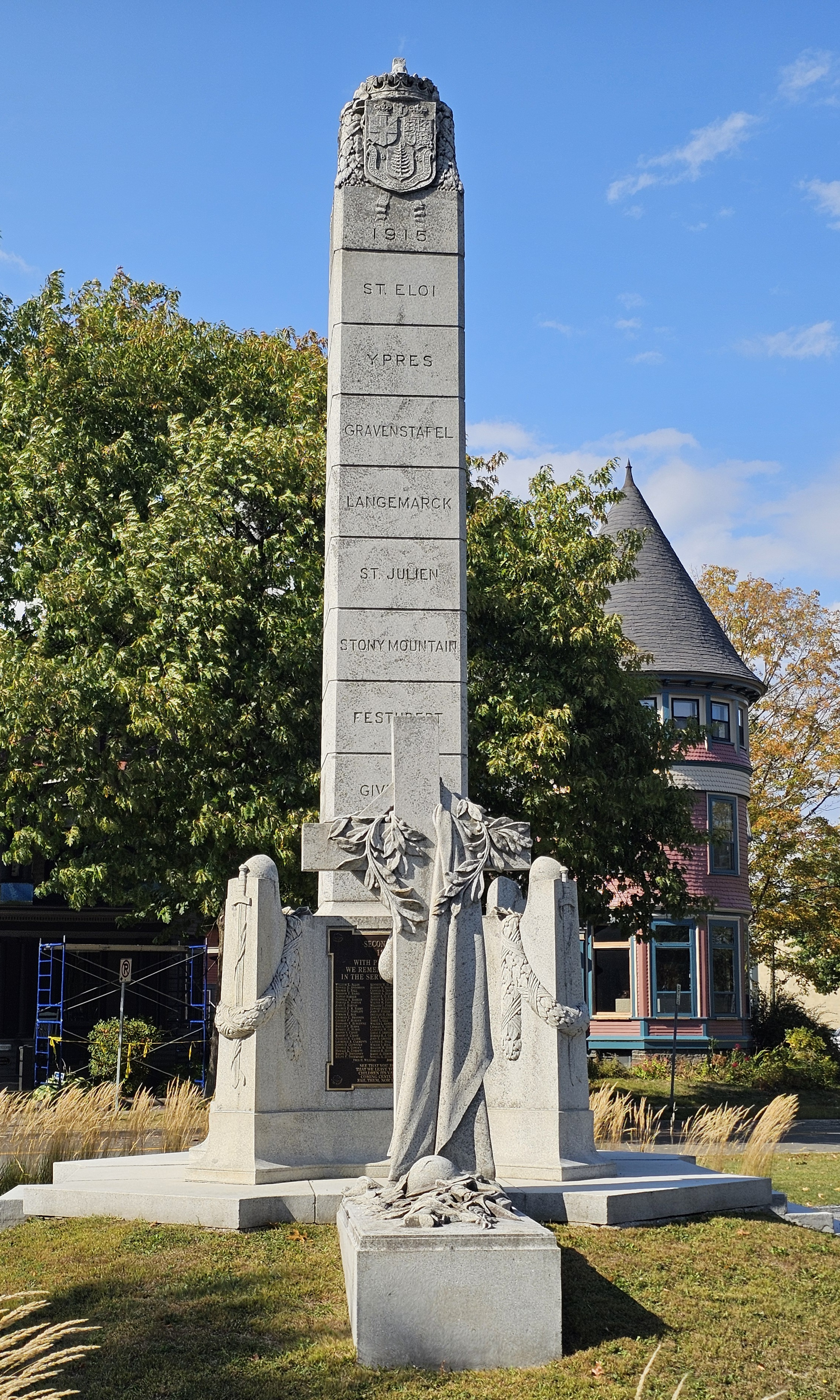
- The cenotaph in 2025
- Interactive map of Fredericton Cenotaph
- Location: 800 Queen Street; Fredericton, New Brunswick, Canada
- Coordinates: 45°57′30″N 66°38′05″W
- Builder: Thompson Monument Company
- Type: Cenotaph
- Material: Granite; Bronze
- Height: 25 feet (7.6 m)
- Beginning date: 1921
- Completion date: 1923
- Dedicated date: November 11, 1923
- Dedicated to: Initially Fredericton's war dead from World War I, later enlarged to include World War II, the Korean War, and the Canadian Merchant Navy

The Fredericton Cenotaph (also known as the New Brunswick Provincial Cenotaph) is a war memorial in Fredericton, New Brunswick, Canada. It was dedicated on Armistice Day of 1923. While it was initially intended to memorialize residents of Fredericton who had died in World War I, its purpose was later expanded to include individuals who had died in both World War II and the Korean War, as well as members of the Canadian Merchant Navy. The memorial consists of a granite shaft with the names of several battles of World War I listed on it. Additionally, bronze plaques affixed to the structure list the names of individuals who had died in the three aforementioned wars. Near this structure is another granite structure consisting of an empty tomb topped with a helmet and several firearms, with a Christian cross at its head.

== History ==
=== Creation and dedication ===
The idea for a war memorial to commemorate individuals from Fredericton who died in World War I began shortly after the end of that conflict. In 1921, the Great War Veterans Association began to discuss plans for a memorial. Several citizens created the Fredericton War Memorial Committee, with Oswald Smith Crocket, a former member of the Parliament of Canada, as its chairman. The committee decided on the general design of the memorial—a stone shaft—and its location: a triangular property located between the intersections of Church Street, King Street, and Queen Street. This land was owned by the nearby Christ Church Cathedral, though Bishop John Richardson of the Diocese of Fredericton allowed the committee to use the land for the memorial. Beginning in 1922, the committee began to collect names of individuals who had died in the war for inclusion on the memorial. Andrew MacVey, the chief bridge engineer for the provincial Board of Public Works, conducted surveying of the memorial's site and assisted the committee in deciding on the memorial's positioning and orientation. MacVey also designed the lettering on the memorial. The structure itself was designed by a company from Quebec, while the Thompson Monument Company of Toronto created and installed the structure. Sources vary on the total cost of the memorial, with estimates of $12,000 (equivalent to $214,000 in 2025) and $20,000 ($357,000 in 2025). Of this amount, $6,000 ($107,000 in 2025) were provided by the Fredericton City Council, while the remainder was covered through fundraising.

Initially, the memorial was planned to be unveiled in July 1923, coinciding with a visit to Fredericton by the governor general of Canada. However, as the committee had not yet collected all of the names that were to appear on the memorial, the dedication was postponed until the following month, to coincide with the anniversary of the Battle of Amiens. Eventually, however, the dedication was moved to Armistice Day, on November 11. Douglas Hazen, who had previously served as the mayor of Fredericton and the premier of New Brunswick, gave the dedicatory address at the ceremony, while Marjorie Osborne, a sister of one of the individuals listed on the memorial, performed the unveiling by removing the Union Jack that had covered the monument. During the event, the names of Fredericton's war dead were read aloud.

=== Later history ===
Over the next several years, the local chapter of the Imperial Order Daughters of the Empire organized annual ceremonies at the memorial to commemorate Armistice Day (later Remembrance Day). However, beginning in 1928, these events have been organized by the local branch of the Royal Canadian Legion. While the memorial was initially dedicated to the war dead of World War I, plaques were later affixed to honor individuals who had died in World War II and the Korean War, as well as one honoring the Canadian Merchant Navy. Additionally, floodlights were added to illuminate the memorial. On October 18, 2007, the cenotaph was declared a Provincial Cenotaph, the first such memorial in all of Canada.

In 2009, the memorial was vandalized shortly before that year's Remembrance Day. Several years later, in October 2015, three plaques were stolen from the memorial. This vandalism occurred about a week after another cenotaph in Fredericton similarly had a plaque stolen from it. Mayor Brad Woodside announced a $1,000 ($1,297 in 2025) reward for information regarding the thievery that could lead to an arrest, while the government of New Brunswick stated that it planned to have the plaques replaced prior to Remembrance Day. By the end of the month, a fundraising effort supported by provincial politician Brian Macdonald had raised about $4,000 ($5,188 in 2025) for the preservation of the memorial. By Remembrance Day, two of the three stolen plaques had been replaced, with work ongoing with the remaining one. By early November, local police had arrested a man in connection with the theft.

In September 2017, the memorial was rededicated following a renovation that saw the addition of nearby walkways and permanent flagpoles. Additionally, the monument was cleaned, the area was relandscaped, and LED lighting was added. An oak tree grown from an acorn that had been brought back to Canada by a soldier from Vimy Ridge was also planted across the street from the cenotaph. Due to the acts of vandalism that had occurred over the previous years, the city was in discussions regarding the installation of permanent security cameras. In total, the project cost $70,000 ($88,144 in 2025). In 2022, the Remembrance Day ceremony at the cenotaph was attended by several hundred individuals, with New Brunswick Lieutenant Governor Brenda Murphy laying a wreath at the memorial. In 2024 and 2025, the annual ceremony attracted bout 1,000 spectators.

== Design ==
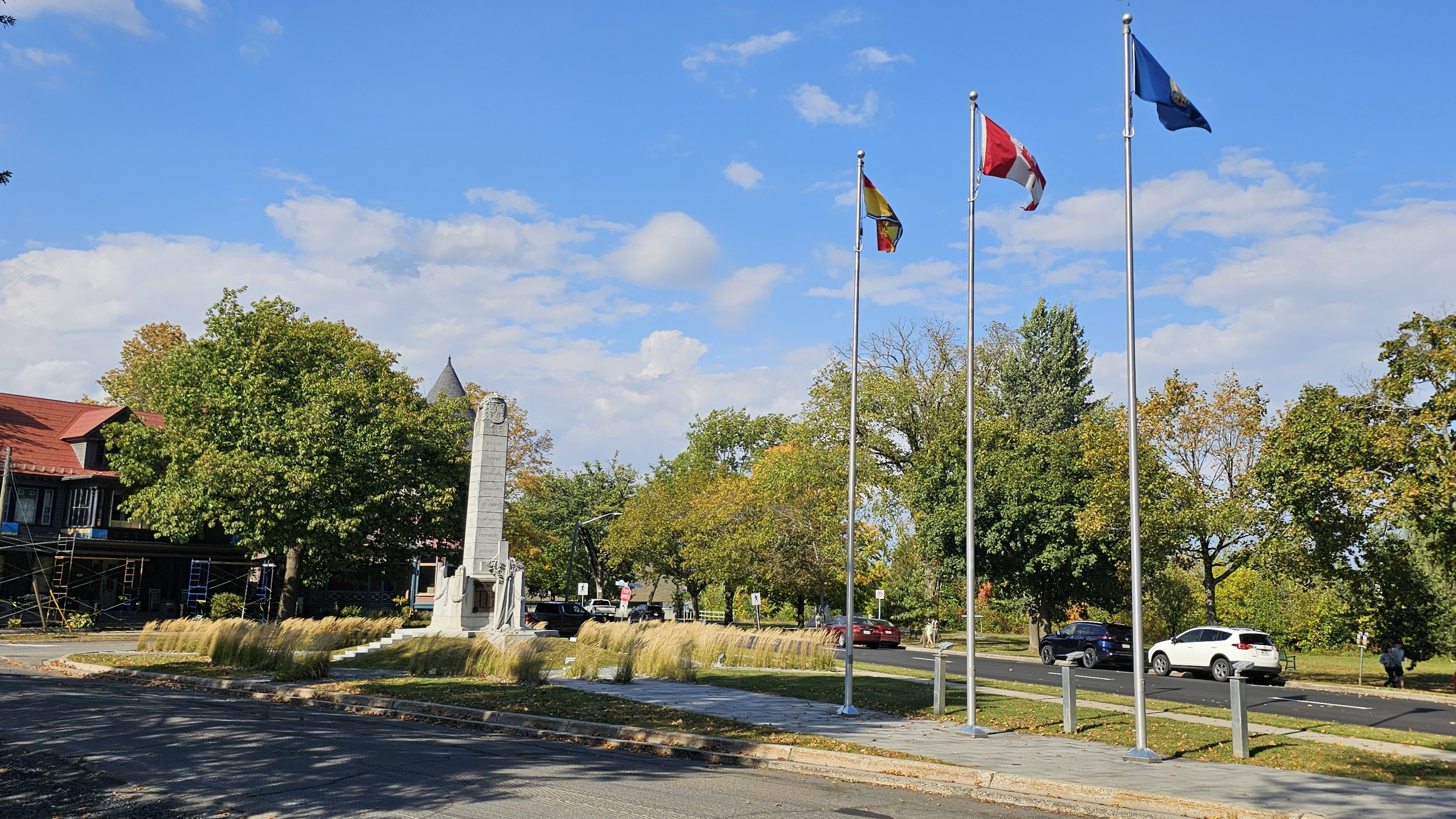
The memorial and surrounding area in 2025

The memorial is located in a plot of land at the intersections of Church Street, King Street, and Queen Street, which the city of Fredericton has given an address of 800 Queen Street. The monument is made of granite, quarried in Quebec, and has a total height of 25 feet (7.6 m). This includes a 14 ft (4.3 m) shaft that rests upon a 26-ton die, which was reportedly one of the largest blocks of granite cut in Canada at the time. The shaft, which is surmounted by a capstone that bears the coat of arms of both Fredericton and New Brunswick, lists the names of 32 battles from World War I. These battles, grouped by year, are:

1915	1916	1917	1918
St. Eloi	Sanctuary Wood	Vimy	Amiens
Ypres	Hill 62	Lens	Arras
Gravenstafel	The Somme	Arleux	Drocourt Queant
Langemarck	Courcelette	Fresnoy	Canal du Nord
St. Julien	Mouquet Farm	Hill 70	Bourlon Wood
Stony Mountain	Zollern Redbout	Bellevue Spur	Cambrai
Festubert	Regina Trench	Passchendaele	Valenciennes
Givenchy	Desire Trench	Masnieres	Mons

At the front of the memorial is a bronze plaque listing individuals from Fredericton who died in World War I, while another bronze plaque listing those who died in World War II is located on the rear. Additional bronze plaques honoring those who died in the Korean War and members of the Merchant Navy are found on the memorial's north and south sides, respectively. The Marchant Navy plaque honors members of that organization who died in all three of the aforementioned wars.

In front of the memorial is another granite structure consisting of an empty tomb with a Christian cross standing where the headstone should be. On top of the tomb is a helmet, a rifle, and other firearms.

=== Gallery of plaques ===
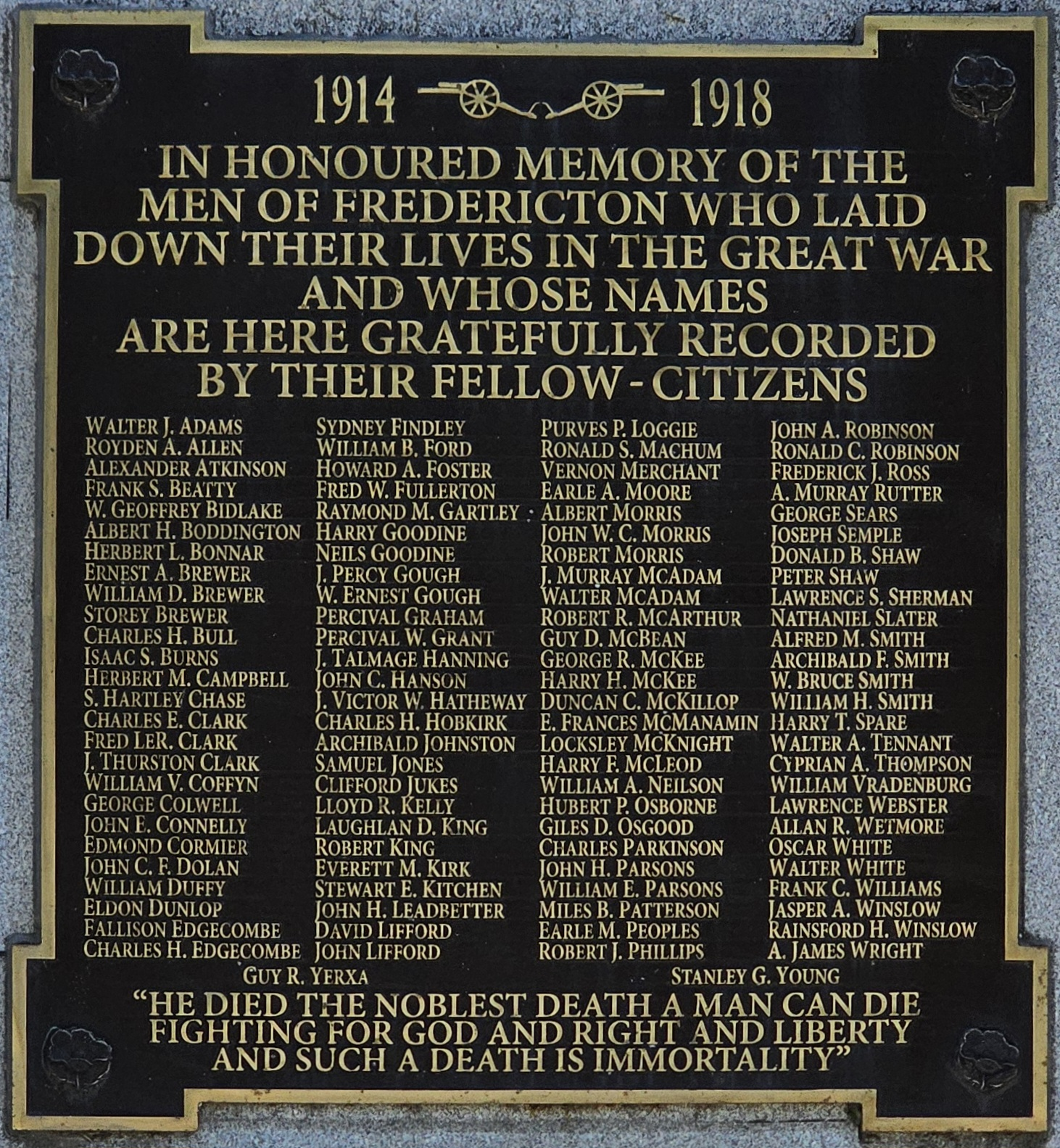
World War I plaque

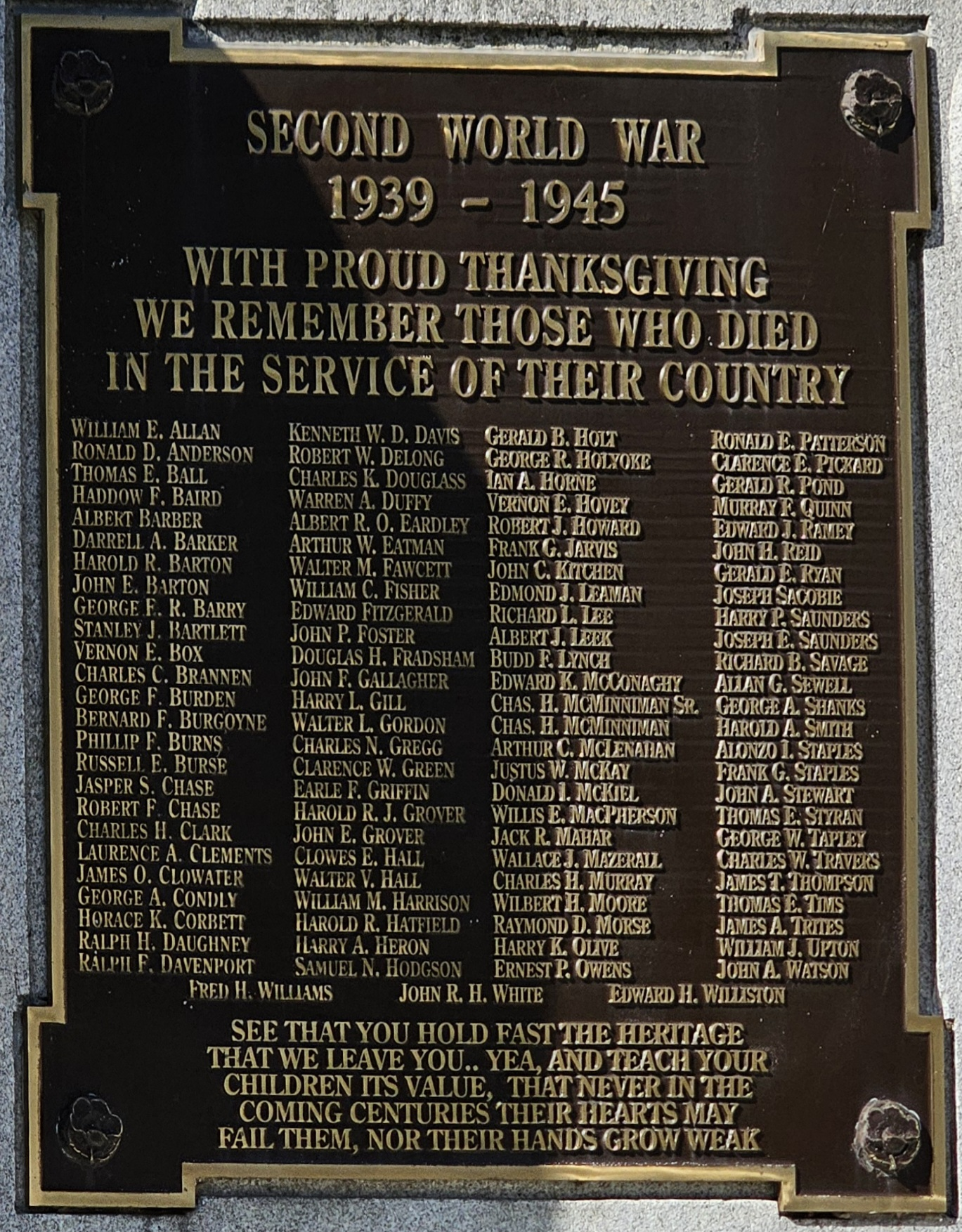
World War II plaque

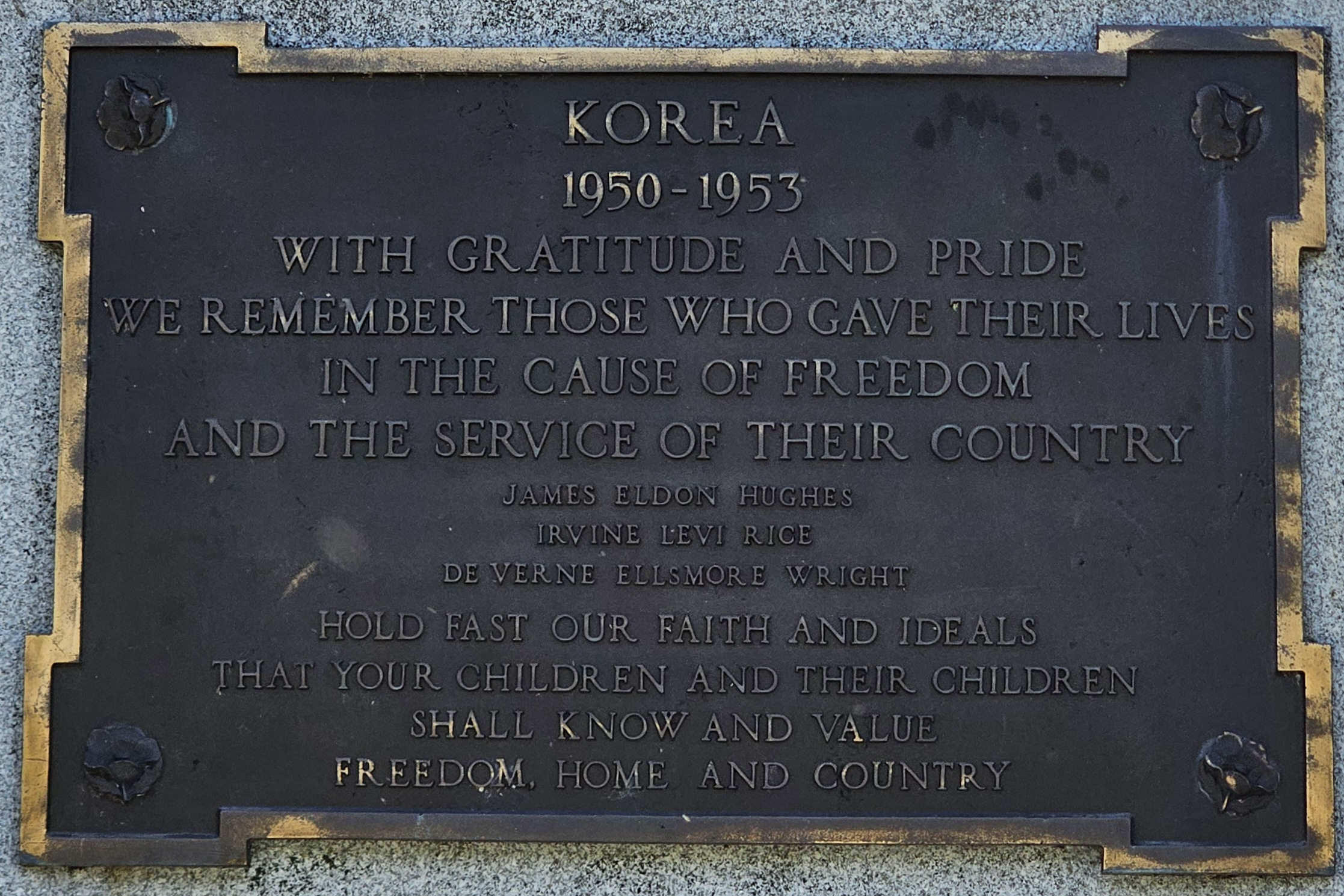
Korean War plaque

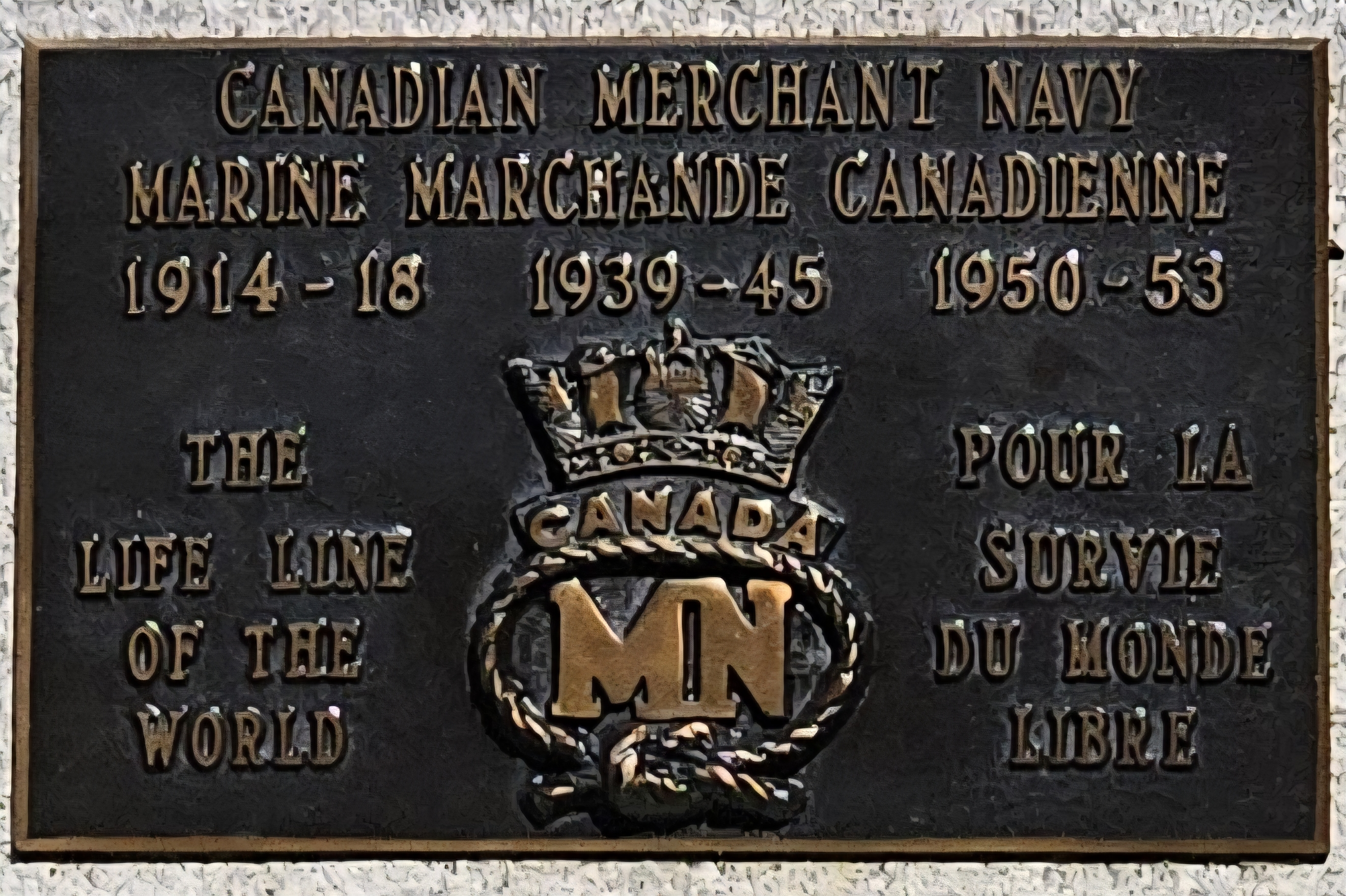
Canadian Merchant Navy plaque

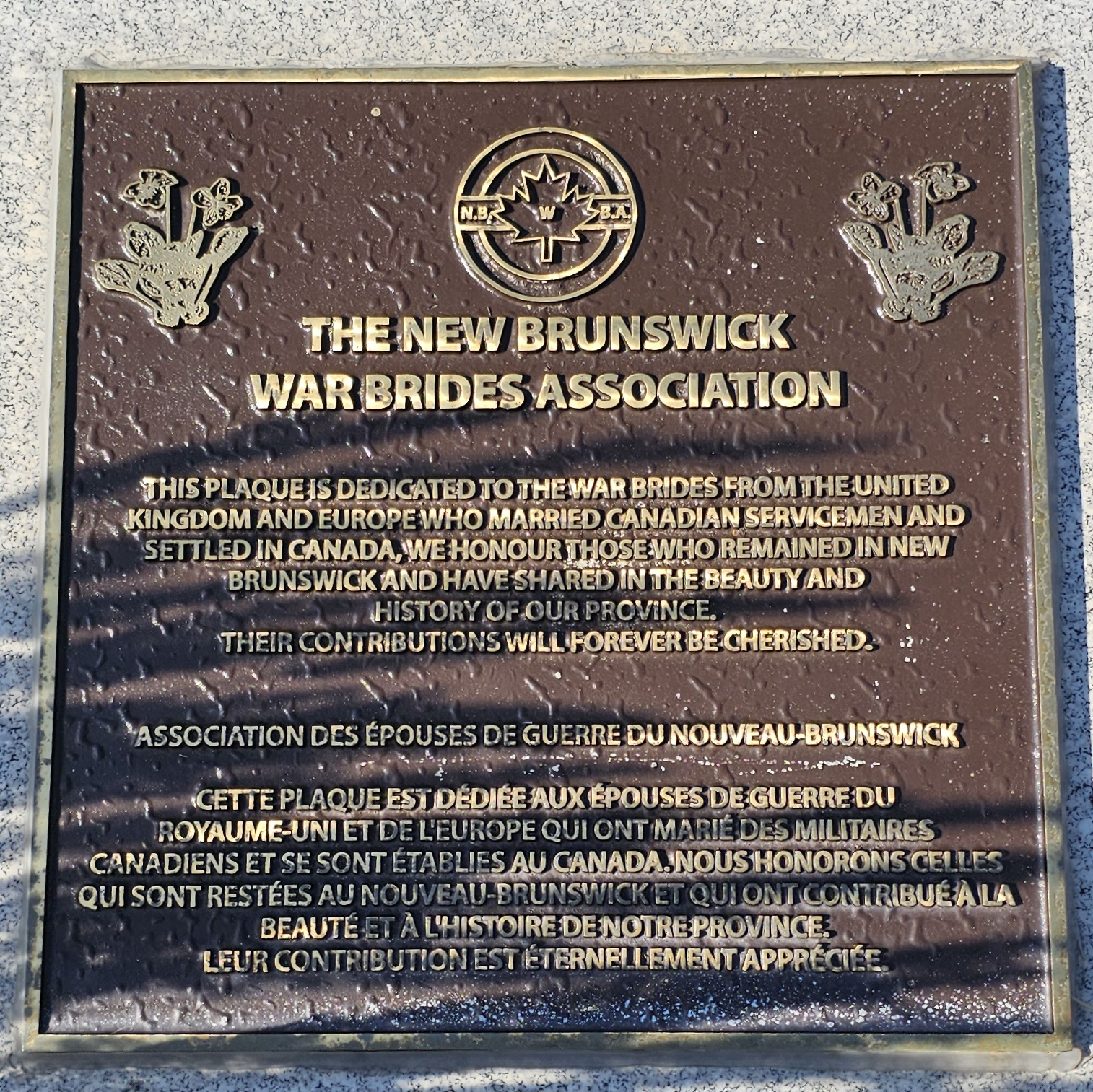
New Brunswick War Brides Association plaque

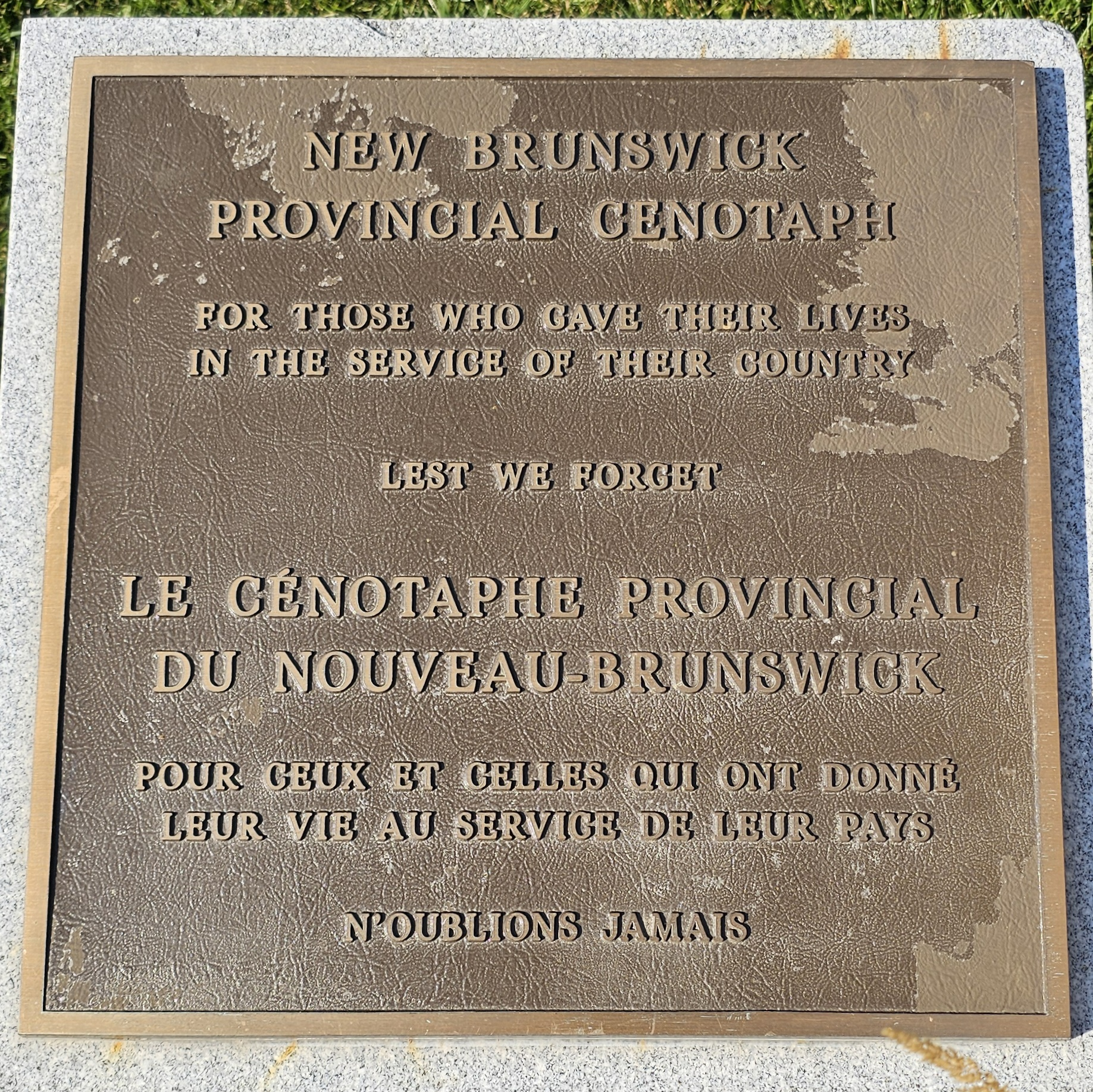
New Brunswick Provincial Cenotaph plaque

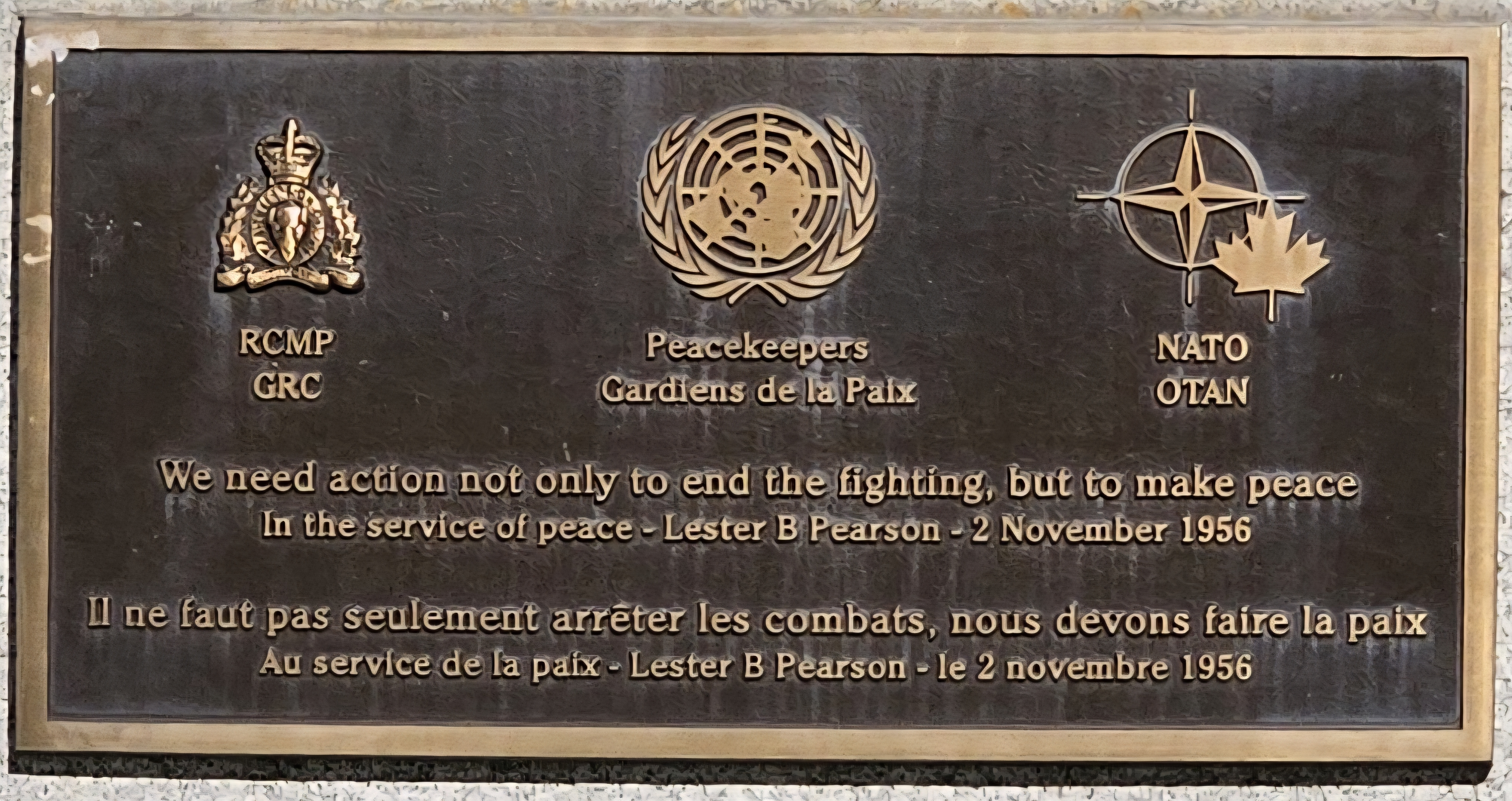
Peacekeepers plaque

== See also ==
- Canadian war memorials
- List of Korean War memorials
- List of public art in Fredericton
- List of World War I monuments and memorials
