= Don Darling =

Canadian politician

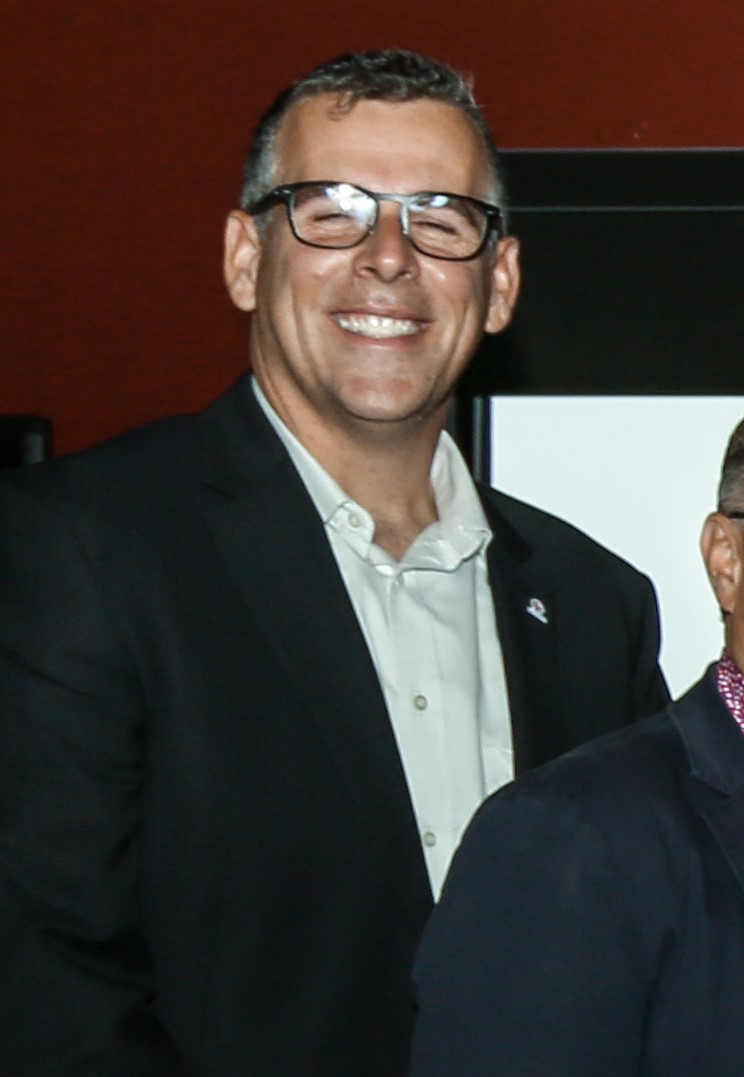
- Darling in 2018

78th Mayor of Saint John, New Brunswick
- In office May 25, 2016 – June 7, 2021
- Preceded by: Mel Norton
- Succeeded by: Donna Reardon

Personal details
- Born: Fredericton, New Brunswick, Canada
- Children: Mariah Darling
- Profession: Construction Industry Consultant

Donald B. Darling is a Canadian politician, who served as the mayor of Saint John, New Brunswick for one term, 2016 to 2021. He was elected on May 9, 2016 in the 2016 New Brunswick municipal elections, and was sworn in as mayor on May 25. He did not run for re-election in 2021.

Darling is known to have an interest in colourful, flamboyant socks. He is known to have engaged citizens in person, at local coffee shops, his mayoral office, and online through social media channels. Darling was a professional bowler prior to taking office and won many championships in the 1990s; including the Fairview Lanes Centennial Closer Tournament.

== Electoral record ==
Mayoral Candidate	Vote	%
Don Darling	8,139	42.95
Shelley Rinehart	6,812	35.94
Bill Farren	3,184	16.80
Patty Higgins	604	3.19
Howard Arthur Yeomans	213	1.12
