= 2026 New Brunswick municipal elections =

Election in Canada

- May 11, 2026
- Turnout: 39.80% (▲4.03)

Municipal elections in New Brunswick were held on May 11, 2026. Voters in the Canadian province of New Brunswick elected mayors, councillors, district education council representative's, and all other elected officials in all of the province's municipalities. Municipal elections in New Brunswick are non-partisan. The list of candidates will be available once nominations close on April 10, 2026. Most mayors are reportedly running for re-election.

== Acadian Peninsula Rural District ==
The results for the Acadian Peninsula rural district advisory committee are as follows: (Note: Each voter was permitted to vote for up to three candidates.)

Candidate	Vote	%
Robert Power (X)	Acclaimed	
Johnny Stewart (X)	Acclaimed	
Denis Thériault (X)	Acclaimed	

== Alnwick ==
The results for mayor and council of Alnwick are as follows:

=== Mayor ===
Candidate	Vote	%
Ernest Yvon Robichaud (X)	Acclaimed	

=== Council ===
==== Ward 1 ====
Candidate	Vote	%
Gerald Albert Ross (X)	Acclaimed	

==== Ward 2 ====
Candidate	Vote	%
Willie Robichaud	137	79.19
Eva-May Haché (X)	36	20.81

==== Ward 3 ====
Candidate	Vote	%
Paul-Emile Thibodeau (X)	Acclaimed	

==== Ward 4 ====
Candidate	Vote	%
Mireille Caissie (X)	Acclaimed	

==== Ward 5 ====
Candidate	Vote	%
Laurie W. Wishart (X)	Acclaimed	

== Arcadia ==
The results for mayor and council of Arcadia are as follows:

=== Mayor ===
Candidate	Vote	%
Robert M. Stoney	607	58.09
Steve LeBlanc	438	41.91

=== Council ===
==== Ward 1 ====
Candidate	Vote	%
Tammy Gordon (X)	Acclaimed	

==== Ward 2 ====
Candidate	Vote	%
Allan Luszcz	191	66.09
Cameron Davidson	98	33.91

==== Ward 3 ====
Candidate	Vote	%
Harry A. Thomson (X)	Acclaimed	

==== Ward 4 ====
Candidate	Vote	%
Steven Sharpe (X)	119	56.13
Kalie Dykeman	93	43.87

==== Ward 5 ====
Candidate	Vote	%
Sheila D. Black (X)	175	74.47
James Larson	60	25.53

==== Ward 6 ====
Candidate	Vote	%
Paula Jo-Ann Gahan-Magee (X)	Acclaimed	

== Bathurst ==
The results for mayor and council of Bathurst are as follows:

=== Mayor ===
Candidate	Vote	%
Kim Chamberlain (X)	3,828	84.24
James Risdon	716	15.76

=== Council (Note: Each voter was permitted to vote for up to eight candidates.) ===
Candidate	Vote	%
Erica Lynn Scott	2,400	8.19
Rickey Hondas (X)	2,313	7.90
Jessica Boudreau	2,304	7.87
Penny Anderson (X)	2,142	7.31
Michael Willett (X)	2,123	7.25
Stephen J. Brunet (X)	2,120	7.24
Mike Skerry (X)	1,981	6.76
Jean-Francois LeBlanc (X)	1,944	6.64
Dale F. Knowles (X)	1,905	6.50
Stephen Legacy (X)	1,882	6.42
Tyler Duguay	1,848	6.31
Michelle Ann Branch	1,473	5.03
Crystal Peters	1,252	4.27
Graham Wiseman	1,064	3.63
Darryl Branch (X)	907	3.10
Curtis Hachey	861	2.94
James O'Neil	774	2.64

== Beaurivage ==
The results for mayor and council of Beaurivage are as follows:

=== Mayor ===
Candidate	Vote	%
Danielle Andrée Dugas	1,813	63.57
Gabriel Comeau	907	31.89
Brian D. Stevens	124	4.36

=== Council ===
==== At-Large (Note: Each voter was permitted to vote for up to two candidates.) ====
Candidate	Vote	%
Léophane LeBlanc	1,178	21.87
Miguel Landry	883	16.39
Albert Maillet	800	14.85
Lucie Vautour	682	12.66
Roger Doiron (X)	644	11.95
Claudette Robichaud	548	10.17
Dana Landry	385	7.15
Gisele Maillet-Ouellette	267	4.96

==== Ward 1 ====
Candidate	Vote	%
Stéphane Godin	252	62.53
Oswald Mazerolle (X)	151	37.47

==== Ward 2 ====
Candidate	Vote	%
Gabby-Gabriel Vautour	Acclaimed	

==== Ward 3 ====
Candidate	Vote	%
Howard Vautour (X)	Acclaimed	

==== Ward 4 ====
Candidate	Vote	%
Susan Daigle	257	49.33
Monique Boucher	102	19.58
Nick Hardman	95	18.23
Paul Lirette (X)	67	12.86

==== Ward 5 ====
Candidate	Vote	%
Linda Savoie	202	40.64
Melanie McDermott (Boudreau) (X)	157	31.59
Rejean Gaudet	138	27.77

==== Ward 6 ====
Candidate	Vote	%
Dianne Comeau	280	46.67
Stella Richard	213	35.50
Tilmon (Tim) Vautour	107	17.83

== Beausoleil ==
The results for mayor and council of Beausoleil are as follows:

=== Mayor ===
Candidate	Vote	%
Roméo J. Bourque (X)	1,687	61.59
Vincent Cormier	659	24.06
André Thériault	393	14.35

=== Council ===
==== At-Large ====
Candidate	Vote	%
Louis Babineau (X)	Acclaimed	
Christine Marie Goguen	Acclaimed	
Monique Robichaud (X)	Acclaimed	

==== Ward 1 ====
Candidate	Vote	%
Bernard Richard	Acclaimed	

==== Ward 2 ====
Candidate	Vote	%
Maurice Moe Cormier (X)	335	58.46
Marc Goguen	238	41.54

==== Ward 3 ====
Candidate	Vote	%
Linda Savoie (X)	Acclaimed	

==== Ward 4 ====
Candidate	Vote	%
Daniel Bourgeois (X)	426	50.71
Owen Newcomb	414	49.29

== Belle-Baie ==
The results for mayor and council of Belle-Baie are as follows:

=== Mayor ===
Candidate	Vote	%
Rachel Boudreau	3,085	59.52
Charles Henri Doucet	2,098	40.48

=== Council ===
==== At-Large ====
Candidate	Vote	%
Anne Thibodeau	2,815	21.23
Robert A. Degrace	2,166	16.33
Annik Noel (X)	1,801	13.58
Jenny Arseneau	1,776	13.39
Marie Lariviere (X)	1,746	13.17
Pricilla Doucet Hachey	1,586	11.96
Ulric Degrâce	1,371	10.34

==== Ward 1 ====
Candidate	Vote	%
Joël Oliver (X)	640	75.03
Marc Goguen	213	24.97

==== Ward 2 ====
Candidate	Vote	%
Mark Roy	377	51.22
Roger Guitard	230	31.25
Roger Vienneau	129	17.53

==== Ward 3 ====
Candidate	Vote	%
Rachel Frenette	408	51.97
Véronik Roy	377	48.03

==== Ward 4 ====
Candidate	Vote	%
Samuel Hachey	555	48.18
Serge Haché	365	31.68
Claudine Roy	232	20.14

==== Ward 5 ====
Candidate	Vote	%
Jean Guy Grant	478	54.88
Anne Bard-Lavigne	393	45.12

==== Ward 6 ====
Candidate	Vote	%
Michel Robichaud	Acclaimed	

== Belledune ==
The results for mayor and council of Belledune are as follows:

=== Mayor ===
Candidate	Vote	%
Mario Lapointe	319	40.38
Nick Duivenvoorden	271	34.30
Paul A. Arsenault (X)	181	22.91
James Christian Dempsey	19	2.41

=== Council ===
==== At-Large ====
Candidate	Vote	%
Brenda Cormier	484	25.26
Dawn Hickey (X)	329	17.31
Ron Bourque (X)	299	15.73
Gina Card	291	15.31
Ivan Doucet	259	13.62
Barry Noel	150	7.89
John McInnis	89	4.68

==== Ward 1 ====
Candidate	Vote	%
Cynthia Robinson (X)	221	53.00
Lilliane D. Carmichael (X)	196	47.00

==== Ward 2 ====
Candidate	Vote	%
James Carrier	150	43.60
Marilyn Guitard McDonnell (X)	114	33.14
Morris Stevens	80	23.26

== Bois-Joli ==
The results for mayor and council of Bois-Joli are as follows:

Candidate	Vote	%
Guy Chiasson		
Mario Pelletier (X)		

== Butternut Valley ==
The results for mayor of Butternut Valley are as follows:

Candidate	Vote	%
Al Brown (X)	605	63.89
Frank Jopp	342	36.11

== Campbellton ==
The results for mayor of Campbellton are as follows:

Candidate	Vote	%
Michel Soucy	3,085	65.67
Luc Couturier	1,603	34.33

== Cap-Acadie ==
The results for mayor of Cap-Acadie are as follows:

Candidate	Vote	%
Serge Leger (X)	Acclaimed	

== Capital Region Rural District ==
The results for the Capital Region rural district advisory committee are as follows:

== Caraquet ==
The results for mayor of Caraquet are as follows:

Candidate	Vote	%
Bernard Thériault (X)	3,058	69.17
Gilles Lanteigne	1,363	30.83

== Central York ==
The results for mayor of Central York are as follows:

Candidate	Vote	%
David DuPlessis (X)	Acclaimed	

== Chaleur Rural District ==
The results for the Chaleur rural district advisory committee are as follows:

== Champdoré ==
The results for mayor of Champdoré are as follows:

Candidate	Vote	%
Marc Babineau	1,419	72.99
Joël MacIntosh	525	27.01

== District of Carleton North ==
The results for mayor of the District of Carleton North are as follows:

Candidate	Vote	%
Andrew Harvey (X)	1,861	70.23
Charles MacDonald	789	29.77

== Doaktown ==
The results for mayor and council of Doaktown are as follows:

Candidate	Vote	%
Bayard O'Donnell		
Carl R. Price		
Caroline St-Pierre Taylor		

== Dieppe ==
The candidates for mayor of Dieppe are as follows:

Candidate	Vote	%
Hélène Boudreau	3,067	41.42
Michel Melanson	2,925	39.51
Ernest Thibodeau	1,412	19.07

== Eastern Charlotte ==
The results for mayor of Eastern Charlotte are as follows:

Candidate	Vote	%
John D. Craig (X)	1,422	60.18
Alexa Detorakis	941	39.82

== Edmundston ==
The candidates for mayor of Edmundston are as follows:

Candidate	Vote	%
Eric Marquis (X)	5,864	79.30
Dave Boucher	1,531	20.70

== Five Rivers ==
The results for mayor and council of Five Rivers are as follows:

Candidate	Vote	%
Tina Beers (X)		
Kevin Scully		

== Fredericton ==
=== Mayor ===
Candidate	Vote	%
Steve Hicks	10,239	53.27
Jenica Atwin	8,604	44.76
John M. Reid	379	1.97

=== Fredericton City Council ===
Ward 1
Candidate	Vote	%
Kate Hunter	1,195	62.50
Heather O'Connell	717	37.50
Ward 2
Candidate	Vote	%
Ryan Gregg	554	30.32
Karen A. Matchett	469	25.67
Donald Arseneault	410	22.44
Sean Winslow	394	21.57
Ward 3
Candidate	Vote	%
Colin Ebbett	957	63.17
Kevin D. Brewer	558	36.83
Ward 4
Candidate	Vote	%
Jocelyn Pike (X)	731	60.21
Jared Hill	483	39.79
Ward 5
Candidate	Vote	%
Angela Hicks	1,081	56.92
Dan Dearing	328	17.27
Sara Cunard	249	13.11
Jim Wisted	148	7.79
Jacob Cloutier	93	4.90
Ward 6
Candidate	Vote	%
P. Blair Sullivan	1,080	58.54
Eric Megarity (X)	765	41.46
Ward 7
Candidate	Vote	%
Josh Hambrook	447	36.40
Lloyd Dutcher	427	34.77
Manisha Varma	251	20.44
Kyle J. McKay	103	8.39
Ward 8
Candidate	Vote	%
Greg Ericson (X)	Acclaimed	
Ward 9
Candidate	Vote	%
Ruth Breen (X)	1,026	66.84
Allan Hilchie	348	22.67
Jeff Shanks	161	10.49
Ward 10
Candidate	Vote	%
Kelly Murray	948	51.49
Jeff Thompson	687	37.32
Brent MacPherson	206	11.19
Ward 11
Candidate	Vote	%
Jason LeJeune (X)	731	73.47
Gray Miller	264	26.53
Ward 12
Candidate	Vote	%
Janet E. Moser	992	50.74
Stacey Collett	963	49.26

== Fundy Albert ==
The results for mayor of Fundy Albert are as follows:

Candidate	Vote	%
Jim Campbell (X)	1,316	69.08
Don Bowman	589	30.92

== Fundy Rural District ==
The results for the Fundy rural district advisory committee are as follows:

== Fundy Shores ==
The results for mayor and council of Fundy Shores are as follows:

== Fundy-St. Martins ==
The results for mayor of Fundy-St. Martins are as follows:

Candidate	Vote	%
John Douglas Cairns	651	61.24
James Bedford (X)	412	38.76

== Grand Bay-Westfield ==
The results for mayor of Grand Bay-Westfield are as follows:

Candidate	Vote	%
Brittany Merrifield (X)	Acclaimed	

== Grand Lake ==
The results for mayor of Grand Lake are as follows:

Candidate	Vote	%
Peter Dufour	1,159	51.22
Kevin Nicklin (X)	1,104	48.78

== Grand-Bouctouche ==
The results for mayor of Grand-Bouctouche are as follows:

Candidate	Vote	%
Aldéo Saulnier (X)	1,206	51.34
Mariette Cormier	1,143	48.66

== Grand Falls ==
The results for mayor of Grand Falls are as follows:

Candidate	Vote	%
Bertrand R. Beaulieu (X)	2,872	72.40
David Raines	1,095	27.60

== Greater Miramichi Rural District ==
The results for the Greater Miramichi rural district advisory committee are as follows:

== Hampton ==
The results for mayor of Hampton are as follows:

Candidate	Vote	%
Dewey D. Doucet (X)	Acclaimed	

== Hanwell ==
The candidates for mayor of Hanwell are as follows:

Candidate	Vote	%
Dave Morrison (X)	1,071	56.40
Pat Septon	828	43.60

== Hartland ==
The results for mayor and council of Hartland are as follows:

== Harvey ==
The results for mayor and council of Harvey are as follows:

== Hautes-Terres ==
The results for mayor of Hautes-Terres are as follows:

Candidate	Vote	%
Cathy Paulin	Acclaimed	

== Haut-Madawaska ==
The results for mayor and council of Haut-Madawaska are as follows:

== Heron Bay ==
The results for mayor of Heron Bay are as follows:

Candidate	Vote	%
Gail Fearon	1,392	53.48
Leigh Walsh	1,137	43.68
Brooke Isaac	74	2.84

== Île-de-Lamèque ==
The results for mayor of Île-de-Lamèque are as follows:

Candidate	Vote	%
Colette Plourde	1,493	58.87
Gerard Benoit	1,043	41.13

== Kedgwick ==
The results for mayor and council of Kedgwick are as follows:

Candidate	Vote	%
Éric Gagnon (X)	1114	88.48
Claudine Bérubé	136	10.80

== Kent Rural District ==
The results for the Kent rural district advisory committee are as follows:

== Kings Rural District ==
The results for the Kings rural district advisory committee are as follows:

== Lakeland Ridges ==
The results for mayor and council of Lakeland Ridges are as follows:

== Maple Hills ==
The results for mayor of Maple Hills are as follows:

Candidate	Vote	%
Erica Warren (X)	Acclaimed	

== Memramcook ==
The results for mayor of Memramcook are as follows:

Candidate	Vote	%
Maxime O. Bourgeois (X)	Acclaimed	

== Miramichi ==
The candidates for mayor of Miramichi are as follows:

Candidate	Vote	%
Veronique Arsenault	3,570	49.13
Shawn Power	1,896	26.09
Peggy McLean	816	11.13
Tiffany Gallivan	809	11.13
Nancy Waye	176	2.42

== Miramichi River Valley ==
The results for mayor of Miramichi River Valley are as follows:

Candidate	Vote	%
Debbie Norton	1,341	53.66
Amanda Brennan	1,158	46.34

== Moncton ==
=== Mayor ===
Candidate	Vote	%
Shawn Crossman	6,593	37.70
Brian F.P. Murphy	6,299	36.02
Charles Leger	4,189	23.95
Jeffrey McCluskey	408	2.33

=== Moncton City Council ===
At large (2 to be elected)
Candidate	Vote	%
Greg Turner	7,682	26.07
Marty Kingston (X)	7,280	24.71
Ana Larade	5,796	19.67
Bryan MacDonald	4,734	16.07
Ali Ettamichi	2,429	8.24
Carl Bainbridge	1,541	5.23
Ward 1 (2 to be elected)
Candidate	Vote	%
Mike Gaudet	2,226	27.39
Felix LeBlanc	2,056	25.30
Brian Branch	1,340	16.49
Reem Fayyad	1,340	16.49
Roy Macmullin	921	11.33
Alex Le	243	2.99
Ward 2 (2 to be elected)
Candidate	Vote	%
Marc Leger	2,150	32.39
Kristin Cavoukian	2,119	31.93
Daniel Bourgeois (X)	1,606	24.20
Todd Hansen	762	11.48
Ward 3 (2 to be elected)
Candidate	Vote	%
Julianna Mutch	3,018	35.40
Bryan Butler (X)	2,512	29.47
Dave Steeves (X)	2,126	24.94
Rodney Arsenault	869	10.19
Ward 4 (2 to be elected)
Candidate	Vote	%
Paul Richard (X)	2,526	41.83
Kate Doyle	2,349	38.90
Kevin Rogers	1,164	19.27

== Municipal District of St. Stephen ==
The results for mayor of the Municipal District of St. Stephen are as follows:

Candidate	Vote	%
Steven C. Backman	2,132	76.12
Mark Groleau	356	12.71
Joyce Wright	313	11.17

== Nackawic-Millville ==
The results for mayor and council of Nackawic-Millville are as follows:

== Nashwaak ==
The results for mayor and council of Nashwaak are as follows:

== Northwest Rural District ==
The results for the Acadian Peninsula rural district advisory committee are as follows:

== Nouvelle-Arcadie ==
The results for mayor and council of Nouvelle-Arcadie are as follows:

== Oromocto ==
The results for mayor of Oromocto are as follows:

Candidate	Vote	%
Bob Powell (X)	Acclaimed	

== Quispamsis ==
In February 2025, Quispamsis mayor Libby O'Hara announced that she would not be seeking re-election.

Candidate	Vote	%
Mary Schryer	Acclaimed	

== Restigouche Rural District ==
The results for the Restigouche rural district advisory committee are as follows:

== Riverview ==
The candidates for mayor of Riverview are as follows:

Candidate	Vote	%
Andrew J. LeBlanc (X)	Acclaimed	

== Rivière-du-Nord ==
The results for mayor and council of Rivière-du-Nord are as follows:

== Rothesay ==
The candidates for mayor of Rothesay are as follows:

Candidate	Vote	%
Matt Alexander	Acclaimed	

== Saint Andrews ==
Ward 3 was pushed back to a June 22 by-election following the death of candidate Kate Akagi.

== Saint John ==
=== Mayor ===
The results for mayor of Saint John are as follows:

Candidate	Vote	%
Donna Reardon (X)	7,168	40.26
Barry Keith Ogden	5,938	33.35
Blaine Robert Harris	4,697	26.38

=== Saint John Common Council ===
The results for the common council of Saint John are as follows:

==== At Large ====
2 to be elected
Candidate	Vote	%
H. Gary Sullivan (X)	7,184	24.54
Gina Hooley	6,302	21.53
Bobby Hayes	5,631	19.24
Tamara Steele	2,856	9.76
Gerry Irish	2,557	8.73
Conzie Connell	1,782	6.09
Randall Goodwin	1,604	5.48
Balazs Lajtha	1,358	4.64

==== Ward 1 ====
2 to be elected
Candidate	Vote	%
Greg Norton (X)	2,255	21.85
Sherri Colwell-McCavour	1,605	15.55
Adam Smith	1,582	15.33
Joe Vautour	1,499	14.53
Blake Armstrong	1,173	11.37
Smoothy Armstrong	865	8.38
Suping Shi	723	7.01
Richard Lee	618	5.99

==== Ward 2 ====
2 to be elected
Candidate	Vote	%
John Colin MacKenzie (X)	2,014	29.95
Brian Wyatt	1,912	28.43
Mohamed Elazab	926	13.77
Russell Wilson	703	10.45
Troy Carpenter	696	10.35
Donald Walton	474	7.05

==== Ward 3 ====
2 to be elected
Candidate	Vote	%
Eric Savoie	1,334	24.77
Ryan Moore	1,193	22.15
Mariah Darling (X)	1,114	20.69
Andrew Miller	851	15.80
Arty Watson	589	10.94
Bryan Wilson	304	304

==== Ward 4 ====
2 to be elected
Candidate	Vote	%
Paul Dempsey	2,393	30.81
David Merrithew	2,100	27.04
Phil Comeau	1,950	25.11
Paula Radwan (X)	1,323	17.04

== Saint-Quentin ==
The results for mayor and council of Saint-Quentin are as follows:

Candidate	Vote	%
Jean-François Martel	1292	78.78
Louis Bérubé	334	20.37

== Salisbury ==
The results for mayor of Salisbury are as follows:

Candidate	Vote	%
Robert Campbell	Acclaimed	

== Shediac ==
The candidates for mayor of Shediac are as follows:

Candidate	Vote	%
Patricia Bourque-Chevarie	3,001	70.05
Normand J. Belliveau	1,283	29.95

== Shippagan ==
The results for mayor and council of Shippagan are as follows:

== Southeast Rural District ==
The results for the Southeast rural district advisory committee are as follows:

== Southern Victoria ==
The results for mayor and council of Southern Victoria are as follows:

== Southwest Rural District ==
The results for the Southwest rural district advisory committee are as follows:

== Strait Shores ==
The results for mayor and council of Strait Shores are as follows:

== Sunbury-York South ==
The results for mayor of Sunbury-York South are as follows:

Candidate	Vote	%
Cory Allen	998	76.48
Larry DeLong	307	23.52

== Sussex ==
The results for mayor of Sussex are as follows:

Candidate	Vote	%
Marc Thorne (X)	1,103	70.84
Sonja Davis Carhart	262	16.83
Tim Hutchinson	192	12.33

== Tantramar ==
The results for mayor of Tantramar are as follows:

Candidate	Vote	%
Debbie Wiggins-Colwell	1,582	55.12
Sabine Dietz	910	31.71
Terry Jones	378	13.17

== Three Rivers ==
The results for mayor and council of Three Rivers are as follows:

== Tobique Valley ==
The results for mayor and council of Tobique Valley are as follows:

== Tracadie ==
The candidates for mayor of Tracadie are as follows:

Candidate	Vote	%
Clifford Robichaud	3,650	41.88
Denis Losier (X)	2,422	27.79
Guy Basque	1,013	11.62
Stéphane Richardson	1,002	11.50
Georgie McLaughlin	628	7.21

== Vallée-des-Rivières ==
The results for mayor and council of Vallée-des-Rivières are as follows:

== Valley Waters ==
The results for mayor and council of Valley Waters are as follows:

== Western Valley Rural District ==
The results for the Western Valley rural district advisory committee are as follows:

== Woodstock ==
The results for mayor of Woodstock are as follows:

Candidate	Vote	%
Jeff Wright	2,085	54.60
Trina Jones (X)	1,570	41.11
Noah J. Walton	164	4.29
