= Matt DeCourcey =

Canadian politician

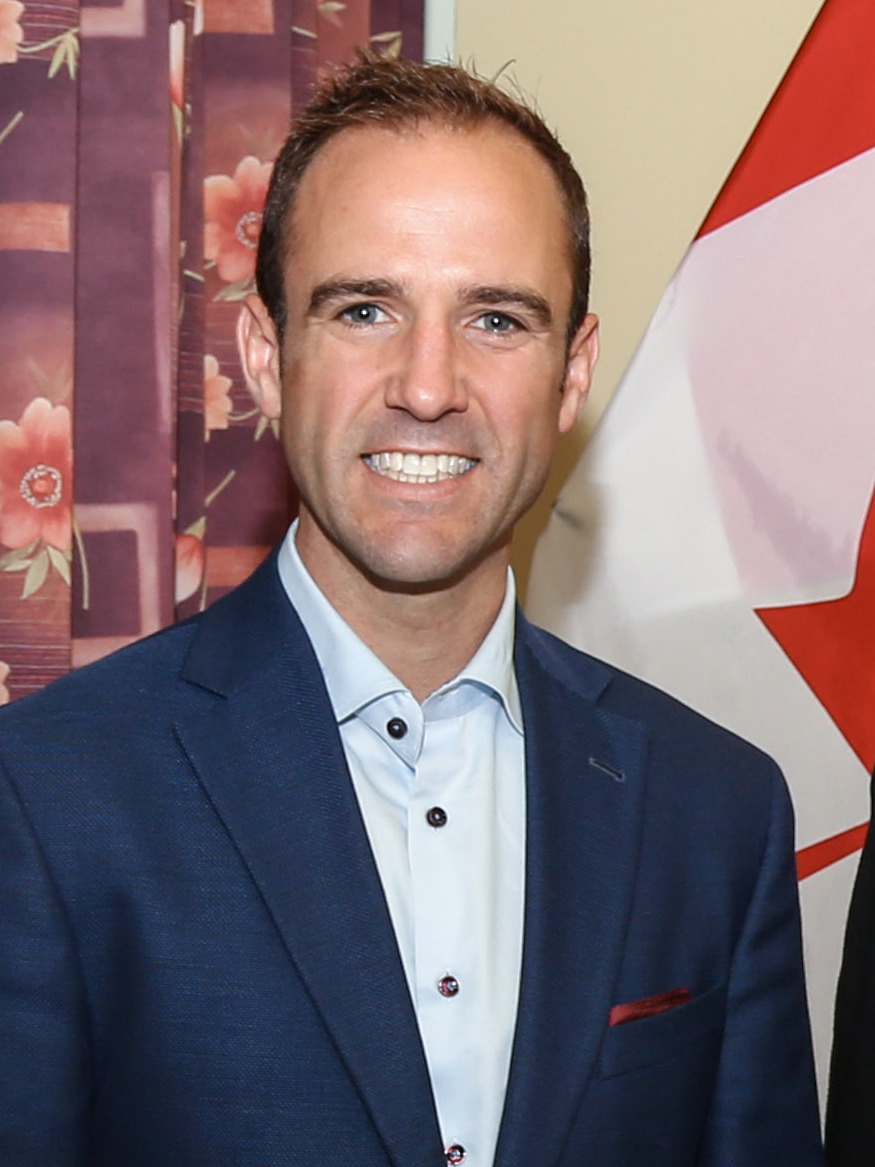
- DeCourcey in 2019

Parliamentary Secretary to the Minister of Foreign Affairs
- In office January 30, 2017 – May 3, 2019
- Minister: Chrystia Freeland
- Preceded by: Pamela Goldsmith-Jones
- Succeeded by: Rob Oliphant

Member of Parliament for Fredericton
- In office October 19, 2015 – September 11, 2019
- Preceded by: Keith Ashfield
- Succeeded by: Jenica Atwin

Personal details
- Born: April 4, 1983 (age 43) Fredericton, New Brunswick, Canada
- Party: Liberal
- Children: 1
- Education: St. Thomas University; Mount Saint Vincent University
- Profession: community outreach specialist

Matthew DeCourcey (born April 4, 1983) is a Canadian Liberal politician, who represented the riding of Fredericton in the House of Commons of Canada from 2015 until 2019.

== Family and education ==
Matthew Carey DeCourcey is the son of Harold DeCourcey, a retired probation officer for the Province of New Brunswick, and Dawn DeCourcey, a retired teacher in Fredericton, New Brunswick.

DeCourcey graduated from Fredericton High School in 2001. DeCourcey graduated from St. Thomas University in 2005. DeCourcey graduated from Mount Saint Vincent University in 2007 with a Master's degree in public relations (MPR).

In 2019, he announced his engagement to Liberal member of Parliament Maryam Monsef.

== Career ==
DeCourcey first became involved in politics during his studies at St. Thomas University, volunteering for Paul Martin's successful federal Liberal leadership bid in 2003. He worked for Fredericton MP Andy Scott from 2005 to 2006, and subsequently worked for Labrador MP Todd Russell. He was a director on the board of the Fredericton YMCA and taught Child and Youth Rights at Saint Thomas University.

He spent five months in The Gambia on an international development initiative, and on his return to Canada he became the director of communications for New Brunswick's Child and Youth Advocate.

== Politics ==
DeCourcey became the Liberal Party's candidate in Fredericton during the 2015 federal election, and won, ousting Conservative incumbent and former cabinet minister Keith Ashfield.

DeCourcey was appointed to the House of Commons Special Committee on Electoral Reform, which was established due to the campaign promise made by the Liberal Party that 2015 would be the last federal election decided under the first-past-the-post system. That committee travelled across Canada in 2016 to consult with Canadians as to their preference for electoral reform, and in doing so, heard widespread support for a switch from the first-past-the-post electoral system to proportional representation. The Liberal government ultimately refused to table any legislation to enact electoral reform.

In spring 2018 DeCourcey was criticized for violating House of Commons rules by using his taxpayer-funded newsletter to recruit volunteers for the Liberal Party.

He was defeated in the 2019 federal election by Jenica Atwin of the Green Party.

== Career after electoral politics ==
In December 2024, Trans Canada Trail announced that DeCourcey had been appointed as its director of government affairs.

== Electoral record ==
2019 Canadian federal election: Fredericton
Party	Candidate	Votes	%	±%	Expenditures
Green	Jenica Atwin	16,640	33.68	+21.26	$55,541.51
Conservative	Andrea Johnson	15,011	30.38	+1.96	$81,269.70
Liberal	Matt DeCourcey	13,544	27.41	−21.85	$82,534.73
New Democratic	Mackenzie Thomason	2,946	5.96	−3.93	$1,197.20
People's	Jason Paull	776	1.57	New	$1,322.69
Animal Protection	Lesley Thomas	286	0.58	New	$2,894.40
Libertarian	Brandon Kirby	126	0.26	New	$965.26
Communist	Jacob Patterson	80	0.16	New	$476.56
Total valid votes/expense limit		49,409	99.39		$101,795.92
Total rejected ballots		301	0.61	+0.20	
Turnout		49,710	74.63	−1.10	
Eligible voters		66,606			
Green gain from Liberal		Swing		+9.65	
Source: Elections Canada

2015 Canadian federal election
Party	Candidate	Votes	%	±%	Expenditures
Liberal	Matt DeCourcey	23,016	49.26	+25.24	–
Conservative	Keith Ashfield	13,280	28.42	-18.55	–
Green	Mary Lou Babineau	5,804	12.42	+8.27	–
New Democratic	Sharon Scott-Levesque	4,622	9.89	-14.41	–
Total valid votes/Expense limit		46,722	100.0		$194,784.13
Total rejected ballots		188	–	–	
Turnout		46,910	–	–	
Eligible voters		60,587			
Source: Elections Canada
