= Steve Hicks =

Canadian politician

His Worship Steve Hicks

28th Mayor of Fredericton
- Incumbent
- Assumed office June 1, 2026
- Preceded by: Kate Rogers

Personal details
- Spouse: Angela Hicks
- Children: 2

Steve Hicks is a Canadian politician who has been mayor of Fredericton since 2026. He previously served as a city councillor, first elected in 2008 and serving for four terms. His wife, Angela, succeeded him as a city councillor.

Hicks previously worked in the criminal and social justice fields, while also working for the Government of New Brunswick as a probation officer. As a city councillor, he represented Ward 5 and served as deputy mayor. In 2026, he was elected Fredericton's mayor, defeating Jenica Atwin. He is a graduate of St. Thomas University and is married with two children.

== Electoral history ==
Candidate	Vote	%
Steve Hicks	10,239	53.27
Jenica Atwin	8,604	44.76
John M. Reid	379	1.97
