= 2016 New Brunswick municipal elections =

Canadian municipal elections

Municipal elections were held in the Canadian province of New Brunswick on May 9, 2016. Here is a summary of the mayoral results in the major communities in the province and the council results for the three largest cities.

== Bathurst ==
Mayoral Candidate	Vote	%
Paolo Fongemie	3,064	54.00
Richard Barbeau	1,831	32.27
Hugh L. Comeau	525	9.25
Anne-Marie Gammon	254	4.48

== Beaubassin East ==
Mayoral Candidate	Vote	%
Ronnie Duguay	1,246	48.15
Jean-Albert Cormier (X)	761	29.40
Marcel Doiron	581	22.45

== Campbellton ==
Mayoral Candidate	Vote	%
Stephanie M. Anglehart-Paulin	1,118	34.67
Ian Comeau	1,090	33.80
Bruce N. MacIntosh (X)	1,017	31.53

== Dieppe ==
Mayoral Candidate	Vote	%
Yvon Lapierre (X)	6,184	83.60
Fred Pellerin	1,213	16.40

== Edmundston ==
Mayoral Candidate	Vote	%
Cyrille Simard (X)	4,753	62.75
Jacques P. Martin	2,821	37.25

== Fredericton ==
Mayoral Candidate	Vote	%
Mike O'Brien	8,192	53.85
Brad Woodside (X)	7,022	46.15

Fredericton City Council

Ward 1
Candidate	Vote	%
Dan Keenan (X)	Acclaimed	
Ward 2
Candidate	Vote	%
Mark A. Peters	536	42.30
Jamie Cummings	261	20.60
Dana Scott	249	19.65
Joseph D. Fisher	221	17.44
Ward 3
Candidate	Vote	%
Bruce Grandy (X)	781	49.12
Kevin Brewer	472	29.69
Kent Fox	337	21.19
Ward 4
Candidate	Vote	%
Eric D. Price	Acclaimed	
Ward 5
Candidate	Vote	%
Steven M. Hicks (X)	Acclaimed	
Ward 6
Candidate	Vote	%
Eric Megarity (X)	782	56.67
Marilyn K. Kerton (X)	598	43.33
Ward 7
Candidate	Vote	%
Kevin Darrah	788	69.00
Tony Whalen	354	31.00
Ward 8
Candidate	Vote	%
Greg K. Ericson (X)	887	82.90
Brennen J. de Carufel	183	17.10
Ward 9
Candidate	Vote	%
Stephen A. Chase (X)	1,060	81.41
Cassia Sanzida Baten	242	18.59
Ward 10
Candidate	Vote	%
John MacDermid (X)	740	56.19
Stephen T. Kelly	577	43.81
Ward 11
Candidate	Vote	%
Kate Rogers (X)	693	68.55
Louie Youssef	228	22.55
William Blake	53	5.24
Ryan Cobb	27	3.66
Ward 12
Candidate	Vote	%
Henri Mallet	675	36.87
Jonathan Richardson	517	28.24
Gerry Maher	399	21.79
Roger Michaud	127	6.94
David A. Bowen	113	6.17

== Grand Bay–Westfield ==
Mayoral Candidate	Vote	%
Grace Losier (X)	1,038	51.18
Adrian Webb	990	48.82

== Grand Falls ==
Mayoral Candidate	Vote	%
Marcel Deschenes	1,639	55.06
Richard Keeley (X)	1,338	44.94

== Miramichi ==
Mayoral Candidate	Vote	%
Gerry Cormier (X)	4,151	53.97
Peggy M. McLean	1,537	19.98
John Winston Foran	1,342	17.45
René J. R. Smith	538	7.00
Keith E. Kenny	123	1.60

=== November 16, 2016 mayoral by-election ===
Mayoral Candidate	Vote	%
Adam Lordon	4,216	58.22
Larry Lynch	1,961	27.08
Peggy M. McLean	1,064	14.69

== Moncton ==
Mayoral Candidate	Vote	%
Dawn E. Arnold	9,789	52.65
Brian Hicks	8,805	47.35

Moncton City Council

At large (2 to be elected)
Candidate	Vote	%
Greg Turner	7,604	22.74
Pierre A. Boudreau (X)	6,616	19.79
Doug Pond	6,198	18.54
Phylomène Zangio	4,535	13.56
Darren Robertson	2,665	7.97
Jean-Marie Martial Nadeau	2,586	7.73
Leo Doiron	2,108	6.31
Peter Surette	1,121	3.35
Ward 1 (2 to be elected)
Candidate	Vote	%
Shawn Crossman (X)	3,241	41.63
Paulette Thériualt (X)	2,561	32.90
Dan Ross	1,325	17.02
Christopher M. Palmer	658	8.45
Ward 2 (2 to be elected)
Candidate	Vote	%
Blair Lawrence (X)	2,815	39.27
Charles Léger (X)	2,679	37.37
Todd Hansen	1,674	23.35
Ward 3 (2 to be elected)
Candidate	Vote	%
Rob McKee	3,759	41.32
Bryan David Butler	2,365	26.00
Tamara Nichol	2,082	22.89
Craig A. McCluskey	891	9.79
Ward 4 (2 to be elected)
Candidate	Vote	%
René Landry (X)	2,985	39.71
Paul Pellerin (X)	2,868	38.15
Andrew J. Williams	1,664	22.14

=== November 16, 2016 Ward 4 by-election ===
Candidate	Vote	%
Susan F. Edgett	1,080	41.13
Paul Richard	1,060	40.37
Roy MacMullin	418	15.92
Michael Campbell	68	2.59

== Oromocto ==
Mayoral Candidate	Vote	%
Bob Powell (X)	Acclaimed	

Plebiscite

Do you want the Town of Oromocto to provide bi-weekly curbside collection of recyclable paper, plastics and metal cans, which will require a forty dollar ($40) per year increase to the eighty dollar ($80) per year fee currently charged to each residential unit for garbage collection?
Option	Vote	%
No	728	78.11
Yes	204	21.89

== Quispamsis ==
Mayoral Candidate	Vote	%
Gary Clark	2,411	47.40
Murray Driscoll (X)	2,150	42.26
Beth A. Fitzpatrick	526	10.34

== Riverview ==
Mayoral Candidate	Vote	%
Ann Seamans (X)	5,124	85.61
Scott Bulman	861	14.39

== Rothesay ==
Mayoral Candidate	Vote	%
Nancy Grant	2,424	62.73
Pat Gallagher Jette	1,440	37.27

== Sackville ==
Mayoral Candidate	Vote	%
John Higham	1,624	81.00
Virgil Hammock	381	19.00

== Saint John ==
Mayoral Candidate	Vote	%
Don Darling	8,139	42.95
Shelley Rinehart	6,812	35.94
Bill Farren	3,184	16.80
Patty Higgins	604	3.19
Howard Arthur Yeomans	213	1.12

Saint John City Council

At large (2 to be elected)
Candidate	Vote	%
Shirley McAlary (X)	11,265	36.25
H. Gary Sullivan	5,743	18.48
Phil J. Comeau	5,526	17.78
John Campbell	4,273	13.75
Albert A. Vincent	2,356	7.58
Glenn Patrick Griffin	1,914	6.16
Ward 1 (2 to be elected)
Candidate	Vote	%
Greg Norton (X)	4,107	41.36
Blake Armstrong	2,832	28.52
Ivan Court	1,984	19.98
Alec R. J. Montgomery	548	5.52
John Peter Brown	460	4.63
Ward 2 (2 to be elected)
Candidate	Vote	%
John MacKenzie (X)	3,316	54.67
Sean Casey	1,624	26.78
Larry E. Harlow	1,125	18.55
Ward 3 (2 to be elected)
Candidate	Vote	%
Gerry Lowe (X)	2,488	43.04
Donna Reardon (X)	2,107	36.45
Alex White	633	10.95
Allen Leslie	552	9.55
Ward 4 (2 to be elected)
Candidate	Vote	%
Ray Stowbridge (X)	2,659	31.59
David Merrithew (X)	2,657	31.56
Daryl R. Bishop	1,282	15.23
Bruce Court	1,026	12.19
David Connell	794	9.43

=== May 6, 2019 Ward 3 by-election ===
Candidate	Vote	%
David Hickey	758	33.81
Andrew Costin	370	16.50
Brad Mitchell	318	14.18
Katelin R. Dean	312	13.92
Frank James	299	13.34
Adam J. C. Salesse	110	4.91
Anthony Capson	75	3.35

== Shediac ==
Mayoral Candidate	Vote	%
Jacques LeBlanc (X)	Acclaimed	

== Tracadie ==
Mayoral Candidate	Vote	%
Denis Losier	4,656	58.17
Aldéoda Losier (X)	3,348	41.83

== Woodstock ==
Mayoral Candidate	Vote	%
Arthur L. Slipp (X)	Acclaimed	
