= Donna Reardon =

Canadian politician

Her Worship Donna Reardon
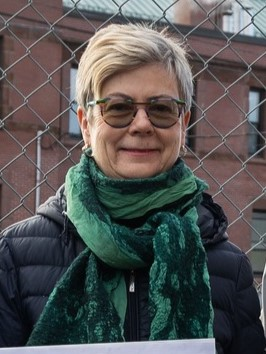
- Reardon in 2024

79th Mayor of Saint John, New Brunswick
- Incumbent
- Assumed office June 7, 2021
- Preceded by: Don Darling

Common Councillor of Saint John, New Brunswick
- In office May 14, 2012 – May 25, 2021 Serving with Donnie Snook, Gerry Lowe, & David Hickey
- Preceded by: Mel Norton & Donnie Snook
- Succeeded by: Gerry Lowe & David Hickey
- Constituency: Ward 3

Personal details
- Profession: Dietician, Office administrator

Donna Reardon is a Canadian politician who has served as mayor of Saint John, New Brunswick, Canada since 2021.

She was first elected as a city councillor in May 2012, and was re-elected in 2016. She was elected the 79th Mayor on May 25, 2021 in the 2021 New Brunswick municipal elections. She was officially sworn in office on June 7, 2021 in the Marco Polo Room of the Saint John Trade and Convention Centre. She is the third female Mayor of the city.

She is a trained dietician and has worked as an administrator at her husband's medical practice.

== Electoral record ==
=== 2026 Municipal General Election ===
Mayoral Candidate	Vote	%
Donna Reardon	7,168	40.26
Barry Keith Ogden	5,938	33.35
Blaine Robert Harris	4,697	26.38

=== 2021 Municipal General Election ===
Mayoral Candidate	Vote	%
Donna Reardon	10,089	60.19
Mel A. W. Vincent	5,895	35.17
Darrell Bastarache	467	2.79
Howard Arthur Yeomans	312	1.86

=== 2016 Municipal General Election ===
Ward 3 Candidate	Vote	%
Gerry Lowe	2,488	43.04
Donna Reardon	2,107	36.45
Alex White	633	10.95
Allen Leslie	552	9.55

=== 2012 Municipal General Election ===
Ward 3 Candidate	Vote	%
Donnie Snook	2,303	29.86
Donna Reardon	1,941	25.17
Patrick McCaffrey	1,142	14.81
Christie M. Belyea	924	11.98
Albert A. Vincent	622	8.07
Graeme Stewart-Robertson	576	7.47
Allen LESLIE	204	2.65
