= Mel Norton =

Canadian politician

Mel K. Norton LL.B.
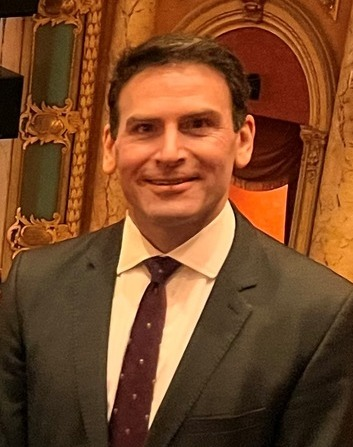
- Norton in 2024

77th Mayor of Saint John, New Brunswick
- In office May 28, 2012 – May 9, 2016
- Deputy: Shelley Rinehart
- Preceded by: Ivan Court
- Succeeded by: Don Darling

Personal details
- Born: Saint John, New Brunswick, Canada
- Party: Progressive Conservative Party of New Brunswick
- Other political affiliations: Conservative (federal)
- Profession: Lawyer; businessman

Mel K. Norton is a Canadian politician and lawyer, who served as mayor of Saint John, New Brunswick from 2012 to 2016.

== Early life and career ==
Norton was born in Saint John, New Brunswick and started his early life on Grand Manan.

He completed a bachelor of arts degree with a major in political science at the University of New Brunswick in Saint John, and then attended law school at the University of New Brunswick in Fredericton graduating in 1999.

Norton was admitted to the New Brunswick Bar in 2000 and has practiced law with Lawson Creamer since that time, becoming a partner in 2010. His practice has focused on labour and employment as well as debtor/creditor law and construction litigation. Norton has been involved in the Canadian Bar Association as a past chair of the Young Lawyers Section as well as an executive member of the Labour and Employment Group. He served five years as a legal officer with the Canadian Forces during which time he also sat on the CBA's Lawyers Assistance Program committee.

His community volunteer work has included participation on a committee to establish a ward system in Saint John, the board of the Saint John Theatre Company and the board for the Abby St. Andrews Mixed Income Housing Project.

Norton currently resides in Saint John with his wife Stephanie.

== Political career ==
Norton was first elected to public office as Ward 3 councillor during a by-election in December 2010. On May 14, 2012, he was elected as the 66th mayor of Saint John in a landslide victory, earning 75.6 per of the vote and taking every poll in every neighbourhood.

On January 14, 2016, Norton announced he would not seek re-election as mayor in the 2016 municipal election.

On May 4, 2016, Norton announced his intention to run for the leadership of the Progressive Conservative Party of New Brunswick. On October 22, 2016, Norton was defeated on the third ballot of the leadership election by Blaine Higgs.
