= Jenica Atwin =

Canadian politician (born 1987)

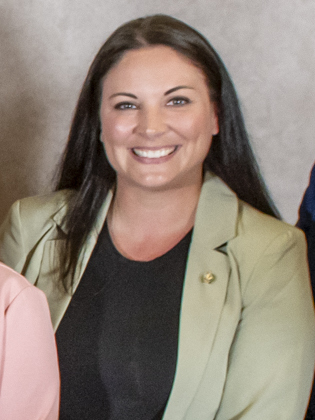
- Atwin in 2023

Member of Parliament for Fredericton
- In office October 21, 2019 – March 23, 2025
- Preceded by: Matt DeCourcey
- Succeeded by: David Myles

Parliamentary Secretary to the Minister of Indigenous Services
- In office September 16, 2023 – March 23, 2025

Personal details
- Born: Jenica Powell; January 10, 1987 (age 39) Oromocto, New Brunswick, Canada
- Party: Liberal
- Other political affiliations: Green (2019–2021)
- Spouse: Chris Atwin
- Children: 2
- Parent(s): Bob Powell (father); Ron Tremblay (stepfather)

Jenica Atwin (née Powell; born January 10, 1987) is a Canadian politician who was elected to represent the riding of Fredericton in the House of Commons of Canada in the 2019 Canadian federal election. Atwin was the first Member of Parliament of the Green Party of Canada to be elected outside of British Columbia and the first woman to be elected in the riding of Fredericton. In June 2021, she crossed the floor from the Green Party to the Liberal Party of Canada, and was re-elected as a Liberal three months later in the 2021 federal election. She declined to run in the 2025 federal election.

Before politics, Atwin was an education consultant and researcher at a First Nations Education Centre. She was a candidate for mayor of Fredericton in the 2026 New Brunswick municipal elections, placing second behind Steve Hicks.

== Early life and education ==
Jenica Atwin was born Jenica Powell and grew up in Oromocto, New Brunswick. Her father Bob Powell is the mayor of Oromocto. Her stepfather is Ron Tremblay, the Wolastoq Grand Chief. In high school, she was class president. She completed a Master's in Education at the University of New Brunswick. In 2016, Atwin co-organized a spin-off of We Day focused on introducing First Nations youth to one another and helping those who have recently moved off of reserves. This took place during Atwin's four years as a cultural transition coordinator and researcher with First Nation Education Initiative Incorporated.

== Federal politics ==
Atwin was elected to represent the riding of Fredericton in the House of Commons of Canada in the 2019 Canadian federal election, defeating incumbent MP Matt DeCourcey. She was the first Member of Parliament of the Green Party of Canada to be elected outside of British Columbia, the first third-party candidate to win the electoral district of Fredericton or its predecessor districts, which have traditionally alternated between Conservative and Liberal Members of Parliament (MPs), and the first woman to be elected in the riding of Fredericton. Along with fellow Green MPs Paul Manly and leader Elizabeth May, Atwin's election created the largest Green caucus ever at three.

In April 2021, Atwin introduced her first private members’ bill, Bill C-285, which would impose a nationwide ban on the use of glyphosate on forests and fields across Canada, stating that the use of glyphosate is a menace to human health, and plant and wildlife diversity.

In May 2021, in response to the 2021 Israel–Palestine crisis, Atwin condemned Israeli airstrikes in the Gaza Strip and called Israel's control of the area apartheid. Atwin also called out Green Party leader Annamie Paul's statement on the conflict calling for de-escalation and more dialogue as "totally inadequate". In response, Paul's senior advisor Noah Zatzman blasted Atwin and fellow Green MP Paul Manly in a May 14 Facebook post, calling their statements regarding the crisis "appalling" and antisemitic, and saying "we will work to defeat you." This followed a statement published on the party website that quoted Paul regarding the crisis, which Atwin responded to with a statement that both reiterated support for the official party policy on the Israeli–Palestinian conflict of expecting MPs to oppose the siege of Gaza and illegal settlements, and described the statement quoting Paul as "totally inadequate".

Atwin subsequently crossed the floor and joined the Liberal Party on June 10, citing lack of support from Paul's leadership after Zatzman's threat. Paul disagreed with this account and commented the events had nothing to do with Zatzman or her; however, Manly and May, the remaining Green MPs, issued a statement stating: "Unfortunately, the attack against Ms. Atwin by the Green Party leader's chief spokesperson on May 14th created the conditions that led to this crisis." On June 14, 2021, shortly after joining the Liberal caucus, Atwin apologized for her earlier remarks, saying that she "regrets her choice of words" and adding: "Palestinians are suffering. Israelis are also suffering as well as their loved ones in Canada and around the world."

On September 16, 2023, Atwin was named Parliamentary Secretary to the Minister of Indigenous Services. In August 2024, Atwin sponsored three Palestine-related petitions, one calling for Canada Pension Plan divestment from Israel, another calling for the teaching of the Nakba in school curriculums, and a third calling for the House of Commons to "re-evaluate the Immigration, Refugees and Citizenship Canada program for Gaza".

During the 2024–2025 Canadian political crisis, Atwin was one of many Liberal MPs to request that Prime Minister Justin Trudeau resign. In January 2025, Atwin decided not to run in the 2025 Canadian federal election.

== Personal life ==
Atwin placed sixth in a 2010 World Series of Poker Circuit ladies tournament in Louisiana. She is married to Oromocto First Nation band councillor Chris Atwin and has two sons.

== Awards ==
In 2021, Atwin was selected as the "Rising Star" among Maclean's 12th annual Parliamentarians of the Year.

== Electoral record ==
=== Federal ===
2021 Canadian federal election: Fredericton
Party	Candidate	Votes	%	±%	Expenditures
Liberal	Jenica Atwin	16,316	37.03	+9.62	$74,982.23
Conservative	Andrea Johnson	15,814	35.89	+5.51	$60,825.30
Green	Nicole O'Byrne	5,666	12.86	-20.82	$91,899.74
New Democratic	Shawn Oldenburg	5,564	12.63	+6.67	$1,870.60
Independent	Jen Smith	310	0.70	N/A	none listed
Libertarian	Brandon Kirby	234	0.53	+0.28	$0.00
Communist	June Patterson	158	0.36	+0.20	$0.00
Total valid votes/expense limit		44,062	100.00	–	$104,943.51
Total rejected ballots		301			
Turnout		44,363	66.72	-7.92	
Registered voters		66,043			
Liberal gain from Green		Swing		+15.22	
Source: Elections Canada

2019 Canadian federal election: Fredericton
Party	Candidate	Votes	%	±%	Expenditures
Green	Jenica Atwin	16,640	33.68	+21.26	$55,541.51
Conservative	Andrea Johnson	15,011	30.38	+1.96	$81,269.70
Liberal	Matt DeCourcey	13,544	27.41	−21.85	$82,534.73
New Democratic	Mackenzie Thomason	2,946	5.96	−3.93	$1,197.20
People's	Jason Paull	776	1.57	New	$1,322.69
Animal Protection	Lesley Thomas	286	0.58	New	$2,894.40
Libertarian	Brandon Kirby	126	0.26	New	$965.26
Communist	Jacob Patterson	80	0.16	New	$476.56
Total valid votes/expense limit		49,409	99.39		$101,795.92
Total rejected ballots		301	0.61	+0.20	
Turnout		49,710	74.63	−1.10	
Eligible voters		66,606			
Green gain from Liberal		Swing		+9.65	
Source: Elections Canada

=== Provincial ===
2018 New Brunswick general election: New Maryland-Sunbury
Party	Candidate	Votes	%	±%
Progressive Conservative	Jeff Carr	3,844	41.2	+0.25
People's Alliance	Morris Shannon	2,214	23.7	+23.7
Liberal	Alex Scholten	2,210	23.7	−7.64
Green	Jenica Atwin	902	9.7	+3.57
New Democratic	Mackenzie Thomason	143	1.5	−20.08
KISS	Danelle Titus	14	0.2	+0.2
Progressive Conservative hold		Swing		{{{3}}}
Source: Elections New Brunswick
