= 2016 Progressive Conservative Party of New Brunswick leadership election =

Canadian provincial leadership election

- Date: October 22, 2016
- Convention: Aitken Centre, Fredericton, New Brunswick
- Resigning leader: David Alward
- Won by: Blaine Higgs
- Ballots: 3

The Progressive Conservative Party of New Brunswick held a leadership election on October 22, 2016, in Fredericton, New Brunswick, to elect a new leader for the party. The position had been held in an interim capacity by Bruce Fitch since former leader David Alward's resignation on September 23, 2014, following his government's defeat in the 2014 provincial election to the Liberals led by Brian Gallant.

The front-runner for the leadership election was Blaine Higgs, a former Minister of Finance and Irving Oil executive serving in the provincial legislature for Quispamsis. His main competitor was Mel Norton, the outgoing Mayor of Saint John. Higgs won the leadership election with 1,563 votes, or 57.2 percent of the votes cast on the third ballot. After securing leadership for the party, Higgs would go on to defeat Gallant in the 2018 provincial election and serve as premier through one re-election until his defeat in his 2024 provincial re-election, after which he resigned as leader. The next leadership election is scheduled to be held in 2026, one decade after this one.

== Background ==
On September 23, 2014, then-Progressive Conservative leader David Alward announced his resignation after his party's government was defeated by the Liberal Party led by Brian Gallant in the 2014 provincial election, which had been held the previous day.

Interest in leadership came almost immediately after Alward's announcement. The following day, Brian Macdonald, the legislative member for Fredericton West-Hanwell made a proposal to serve as interim leader, though he was disinterested in seeking leadership. Don Desserud, a political scientist at the University of Prince Edward Island, considered Trevor Holder as being a strong leadership candidate. It was scheduled for an interim leader to be appointed within weeks, with a leadership convention being held at an unspecified date in the future.

== Declared candidates ==
- Brian Macdonald, MLA for Fredericton West-Hanwell

Candidacy declared: January 21, 2016.
Endorsements: Peter MacKay, Noël Kinsella, Jody Carr, Jeff Carr, Jack Carr, Carl Urquhart

- Blaine Higgs, MLA for Quispamsis (2010–2024), Minister of Finance (2010–2014)

Candidacy declared: March 17, 2016.
Endorsements: Bill Oliver, Sherry Wilson, Brian Keirstead, Rob Moore, Ernie Steeves

- Monica Barley, Moncton lawyer

Candidacy declared: April 15, 2016.
Endorsements: Claude Williams, Ted Flemming

- Mike Allen, MP for Tobique—Mactaquac (2006–2015)

Candidacy declared: April 21, 2016.
Endorsements: Kirk MacDonald, Richard Bragdon, Pam Lynch

- Mel Norton, Mayor of Saint John, New Brunswick (2012–2016)

Candidacy declared: May 4, 2016.
Endorsements: Gary Crossman, Dorothy Shephard, Trevor Holder, Glen Savoie, Ross Wetmore, Rodney Weston.

- Jake Stewart, MLA for Southwest Miramichi-Bay du Vin (2010–2021)

Candidacy declared: May 26, 2016.
Endorsements: Jim Parrott

- Jean Dubé, MLA for Campbellton (2001–2003), MP for Madawaska—Restigouche (1997–2000)

Candidacy declared: June 27, 2016.

Chose not to endorse: Bruce Fitch, Madeleine Dubé, Bruce Northrup, Stewart Fairgrieve

=== Declined candidates ===
- Madeleine Dubé, MLA for Edmundston-Saint Basile, former Health Minister, Education Minister, and Social Development Minister
- Ted Flemming, MLA for Rothesay, former Health Minister (2012–2014)

== Process ==
All members who have paid the $40 membership fee were eligible to vote on October 22 at the Aitken Centre or at one of several satellite locations around the province. The election used a one member, one vote process. Balloting continued until one candidate received 50% + 1 of ballots cast. A maximum of four candidates were allowed to proceed to the second ballot. As there was no victor on the second ballot, the lowest placed candidate was dropped from the third and subsequent ballots until one candidate received the required level of support.

== Election results ==
Up to four candidates with more than 15% is required to move to the second ballot; more than 50% of the vote is required to win the election.

Legend

= Eliminated from next round
= Winner

2016 PCNB leadership ballot
Candidate	First ballot		Second ballot			Third ballot		
Candidate	Votes	%	Votes	%	+/-	Votes	%	+/-
Blaine Higgs	1,228	22.37	1,417	34.56	+12.19	1,563	57.21	+22.65
Mel Norton	1,078	19.64	993	24.22	+4.58	1,169	42.79	+18.57
Monica Barley	948	17.27	861	21.00	+3.73	Endorsed Norton		
Mike Allen	892	16.25	829	20.22	+3.97	Endorsed Higgs		
Jake Stewart	700	12.75	Endorsed Barley					
Brian Macdonald	605	11.02	Endorsed Barley					
Jean F. Dubé	39	0.71	Endorsed Higgs					

== Timeline ==
- September 22, 2014 – Provincial election results in the defeat of Premier David Alward's Progressive Conservative government after a single term.
- September 23, 2014 – Alward announces his resignation as party leader.
- October 18, 2014 – Bruce Fitch is chosen by the party caucus to serve as interim leader.
- January 21, 2016 – Brian Macdonald announces his candidacy for leader.
- January 30, 2016 – Party executive meets and sets October 22, 2016 as the date for the leadership convention and announces that the convention will be held at the Aitken Centre in Fredericton.
- March 17, 2016 – Blaine Higgs announces his candidacy for leader.
- April 15, 2016 – Monica Barley announces her candidacy for leader.
- April 21, 2016 – Mike Allen announces his candidacy for leader.
- May 4, 2016 – Mel Norton announces his candidacy for leader.
- May 26, 2016 – Jake Stewart, MLA for Southwest Miramichi-Bay du Vin announces his candidacy for leader.
- July 27, 2016 – Jean F. Dubé announces his candidacy for leader.
- August 26, 2016 – Due to the large number of candidates the party executive modifies the rules so that only a maximum of four candidates will be permitted to proceed to the second ballot, if one is required.
- October 22, 2016 – Leadership convention is held, Blaine Higgs is elected leader after three ballots.
