= Fredericton City Hall =

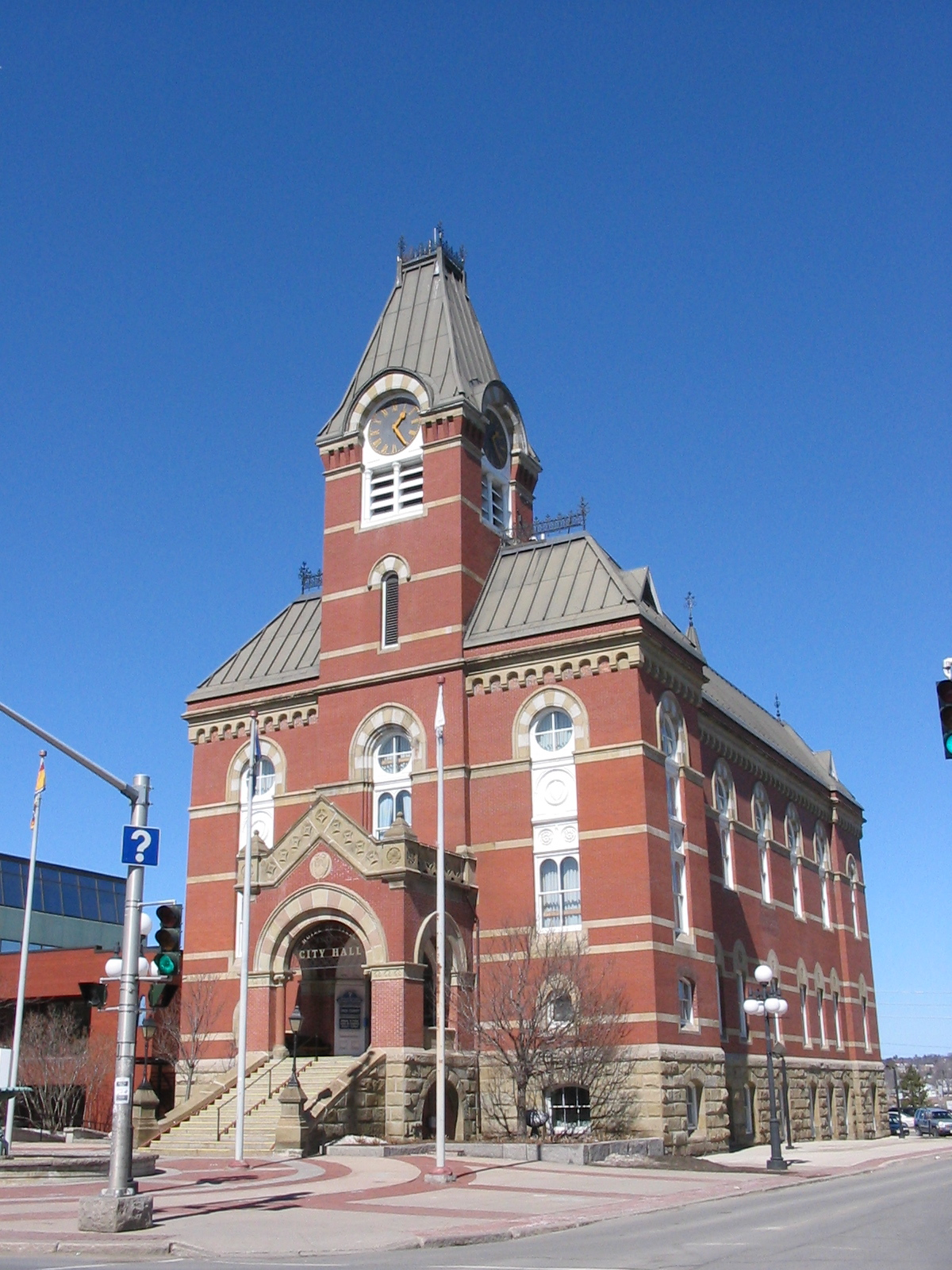
- Fredericton City Hall, March 26, 2005
- Interactive map of Fredericton City Hall
- Location: 397 Queen Street; Fredericton, New Brunswick; E3B 1B5
- Coordinates: 45°57′48.5284″N 66°38′35.6017″W
- Built: January 1, 1875-January 1, 1876
- Architect: McKean and Fairweather
- Architectural style: Second Empire
- Governing body: Fredericton City Council

National Historic Site of Canada
- Official name: Fredericton City Hall National Historic Site of Canada
- Designated: November 23, 1984

New Brunswick Heritage Conservation Act
- Official name: Fredericton City Hall
- Type: Local Historic Place
- Designated: September 11, 2006

The Fredericton City Hall is the meeting place of the Fredericton City Council in Fredericton, New Brunswick, Canada. The three-storey building was constructed between 1875 and 1876 by architects McKean and Fairweather and built by H. B. Crosby and O. M. Campbell in the Second Empire style. It is located near Phoenix Square in Downtown Fredericton.

The building was declared a National Historic Site of Canada on November 23, 1984 because its imposing exterior and the many functions it has performed illustrate the building's importance to the community. Moreover, it is the oldest municipal hall in Atlantic Canada still used for civic administration, and the building is distinguished by the use of its basement as a market before 1951, a function rarely combined with municipal halls by the late 19th century.

Between 1883 and 1971, the Fredericton Police was headquartered here.
