= Mike O'Brien (Canadian politician) =

Canadian politician

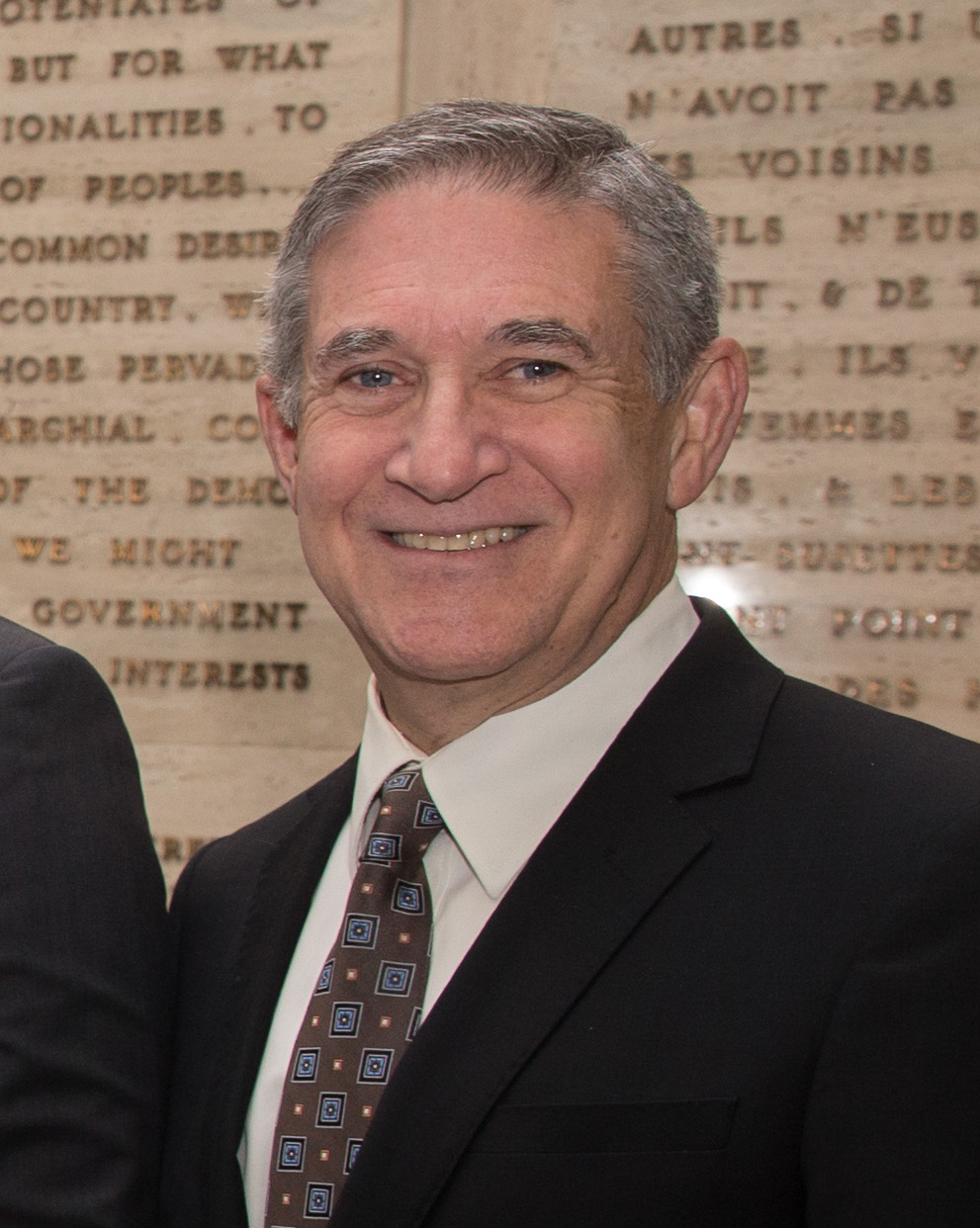

Mayor of Fredericton, New Brunswick
- In office 2016–2021
- Preceded by: Brad Woodside
- Succeeded by: Kate Rogers

Michael O'Brien is a Canadian politician, who was elected mayor of Fredericton, New Brunswick in the 2016 municipal election. He defeated incumbent mayor Brad Woodside.

Prior to winning the mayoralty, O'Brien served on Fredericton City Council as a city councillor from 2001 to 2016.

A professional engineer, he most recently worked for NB Liquor, including a period as interim president and CEO.

In 2021, he lost the municipal election to former Ward 11 city councillor Kate Rogers.
