= Thomas Carleton Allen =

Canadian attorney and politician (1852–1927)

Thomas Carleton Allen KC, LIB, DCL

Mayor of Fredericton
- In office 1890-1892

Personal details
- Born: Nov 1852 Fredericton, New Brunswick
- Died: 22 September 1927 (aged 74) Fredericton, New Brunswick
- Resting place: Forest Hill Cemetery, Fredericton
- Spouse: Louise Wetmore (m. 1878)
- Children: Two sons, one daughter
- Parent(s): Sir John Campbell, Margaret A. (Drury) Allen
- Education: Fredericton Collegiate Schools
- Alma mater: Harvard Law School
- Occupation: Attorney

Thomas Carleton Allen, KC (November 1852 in Fredericton, New Brunswick – 22 September 1927) was a Canadian attorney who was a former mayor of the city of Fredericton, 1890–1892.

== Family ==
He was the son of Sir John Campbell Allen and Margaret Austen Drury. His father was for many years Chief Justice of N. B., and mayor of Fredericton in 1851.

== Education and legal career ==
He was educated at Fredericton Collegiate Schools until 1868. After completing his general studies at the Charlotte County Grammar School, he studied law with Messrs. Botsford and Wetmore of Fredericton and with Messrs. Duff and Jeremiah Norman Travis of St. John. He graduated from Harvard Law School with a degree of Bachelor of Laws and later pursued a special course at the same institution. He was admitted an attorney, Oct., 1874, and was admitted as a barrister the following year. He practised alone in Fredericton, N. B., until 1878, when he moved to St. John, and became identified with W. B. Chandler under the name of Chandler and Allen, which firm existed until 1883. He was appointed Clerk of the Pleas and Court in Equity, Apr., 1883. While in practice he was retained as counsel for Mrs. Merritt of New York, who contested the will of Charles Merritt, which involved a large estate and which, after being in the court for three years, was settled out of court.

== Personal life ==
He married Louise Wetmore in December 1878; they had two sons, one daughter.
