= Kate Rogers (politician) =

Canadian politician

Mayor of Fredericton, New Brunswick
- In office June 14, 2021 – June 1, 2026
- Preceded by: Mike O'Brien
- Succeeded by: Steve Hicks

Kate Rogers is a Canadian politician who has served as Mayor of Fredericton since 2021; she is the first woman to serve in that role.

Before winning the mayoralty, Rogers served on the Fredericton City Council as the councillor for ward 11, having been elected in 2012 and 2016. Prior to the municipal election in 2021, Rogers served as the only woman on the city council. She defeated incumbent mayor Mike O'Brien in 2021. She did not seek re-election in 2026.

== Electoral history ==
2021 municipal election

Mayoral Candidate	Vote	%
Kate Rogers	9,056	54.37
Mike O'Brien (X)	5,045	30.29
Corinne Hersey	2,252	13.52
Drew Brown	302	1.81

== Personal life ==
Rogers is married to Mike Wolfe; the couple has two daughters.
