= Brad Woodside =

Canadian politician

His Worship Brad Woodside

Mayor of Fredericton, New Brunswick
- In office 2004–2016
- Preceded by: Les Hull
- Succeeded by: Mike O'Brien
- In office 1986–1999
- Preceded by: Elbridge Wilkins
- Succeeded by: Sandy DiGiacinto

Personal details
- Born: Bradley Stanford Woodside; October 9, 1948 (age 77) Fredericton, New Brunswick

Bradley Stanford Woodside (born October 9, 1948, in Fredericton, New Brunswick) is a Canadian Politician who served as the mayor of Fredericton, New Brunswick, between 1986 and 1999 and again between 2004 and 2016. Woodside also served as the president of the Federation of Canadian Municipalities. First elected as a city councillor for Fredericton City Council in 1981, he also served as deputy mayor. In 1986, Woodside was elected Mayor of Fredericton and served eight terms as mayor over the next 30 years, which makes him the longest-serving mayor of Fredericton.

In 1999, Woodside resigned as mayor to run for MLA of the Fredericton North riding (No. 43) for the Liberal party. He lost to Peter Forbes of the Progressive Conservatives. Woodside ran for mayor again in 2004 and won.

As mayor, Woodside promoted information technology in Fredericton, and helped develop information technology infrastructure such as the Fred eZone wireless zone. During his tenure as mayor, music festivals have been promoted in Fredericton including the Harvest Jazz and Blues Festival, the Country Music Festival, and FredRock. While infill development and sustainability have been priorities of his tenure as mayor, he has also faced controversy over sprawling box-store development in the university woods, a previously protected wooded area.

Woodside received an honorary doctor of laws degree from St. Thomas University in 2011. Eleven professors at the small liberal arts university protested, in part because of his refusal to proclaim Pride Weekend in the 1990s.

In the 2016 municipal election, Woodside was defeated by city councillor Mike O'Brien.

1988 Canadian federal election: Fredericton
Party	Candidate	Votes	%	±%
Progressive Conservative	Bud Bird	20,494	42.98	-15.87
Liberal	Brad Woodside	18,939	39.72	+16.66
New Democratic	Allan Sharp	4,922	10.32	-6.89
Confederation of Regions	Greg Hargrove	2,755	5.78	Ø
Rhinoceros	Chris Fullerton	316	0.66	Ø
Independent	Harry Marshall	253	0.53	-0.35
Total valid votes		47,679	100.00	
