= 2021 New Brunswick municipal elections =

Canadian municipal elections

- May 10, 2021
- Registered: 576,703
- Turnout: 30.35%

Municipal elections were held in the Canadian province of New Brunswick on May 10, 2021. They were originally supposed to be held May 11, 2020, but were postponed one year due to the COVID-19 pandemic in New Brunswick. Furthermore, elections in some municipalities in Northwestern New Brunswick were held on May 25 due to those areas being under lockdown. Elections were also held for district education councils and regional health authorities (Horizon Health Network and Vitalité Health Network), and there were two plebiscites (annexation of the town and parish of Saint-Quentin and allowing people to own hens for non-commercial purposes in Blacks Harbour).

Here is a summary of the mayoral races in the largest municipalities in the province and the council races for the three largest cities. Election results were released on May 25, following the postponed elections in Northwest New Brunswick.

== Bathurst ==
The candidates for mayor are as follows:

Mayoral Candidate	Vote	%
Kim Chamberlain	2,825	66.31
Richard Barbeau	977	22.93
Greg Bossé	458	10.75

== Beaubassin East ==
The candidates for mayor are as follows:

Mayoral Candidate	Vote	%
Louise Landry	1,105	45.89
Susan Cormier	832	34.55
Ronnie Duguay (X)	389	16.15
Justin A. Guignard	82	3.41

== Campbellton ==
The candidates for mayor are as follows:

Mayoral Candidate	Vote	%
Ian Comeau	1,895	66.00
Joey Goulette	520	18.11
Gilles Roy	456	15.88

== Dieppe ==
The candidates for mayor are as follows:

Mayoral Candidate	Vote	%
Yvon Lapierre (X)	Acclaimed	

== Edmundston ==
The race in Edmundston will be held on May 25 due to a lockdown in Northwestern New Brunswick.

The candidates for mayor are as follows:

Mayoral Candidate	Vote	%
Eric Marquis	4,453	63.52
Lise Ouellette	2,557	36.48

== Fredericton ==
The candidates are as follows:

=== Mayor ===
Candidates

- Andrew Brown
- Corinne Saunders Hersey - Sociology professor at St. Thomas University.
- Mike O'Brien - Incumbent mayor.
- Kate Rogers - Ward 11 city councillor.

Results

Mayoral Candidate	Vote	%
Kate Rogers	9,056	54.37
Mike O'Brien (X)	5,045	30.29
Corinne Hersey	2,252	13.52
Drew Brown	302	1.81

=== Fredericton City Council ===
Ward 1
Candidate	Vote	%
Margo Sheppard	685	53.60
Karen Grant	454	35.52
Dennis Atchison	139	10.88
Ward 2
Candidate	Vote	%
Mark Peters (X)	712	59.88
Sean Winslow	477	40.12
Ward 3
Candidate	Vote	%
Bruce Grandy (X)	604	43.11
Anthea Plummer	399	28.48
Troy Haines	398	28.41
Ward 4
Candidate	Vote	%
Jocelyn Pike	478	51.01
Sheldon Currie	305	32.55
Eric Price (X)	154	16.44
Ward 5
Candidate	Vote	%
Steve Hicks (X)	789	59.91
Denver Boreland	528	40.09
Ward 6
Candidate	Vote	%
Eric MeGarity (X)	614	43.89
Maegen Black	406	29.02
Sharon Levesque	308	22.02
Ian LeTourneau	71	5.08
Ward 7
Candidate	Vote	%
Kevin Darrah (X)	613	52.26
Gail Costello	560	47.74
Ward 8
Candidate	Vote	%
Greg Ericson (X)	632	48.77
Scott Smith	350	27.01
Joshua Paul	314	24.23
Ward 9
Candidate	Vote	%
Ruth Breen	888	55.71
Stephen A. Chase (X)	647	40.59
Jeff Shanks	59	3.70
Ward 10
Candidate	Vote	%
Cassandra M. Blackmore	928	48.61
Kelly L. Murray	642	33.63
Alan J. Atkins	339	17.76
Ward 11
Candidate	Vote	%
Jason LeJeune	689	59.04
Louie Youssef	382	32.73
David Wells	96	8.23
Ward 12
Candidate	Vote	%
Henri Mallet (X)	703	38.44
Janet Moser	680	37.18
Kandise Brown	446	24.38

== Grand Falls ==
The candidates for mayor are as follows:

Mayoral Candidate	Vote	%
Marcel Yvon Deschênes (X)	Acclaimed	

== Miramichi ==
The candidates for mayor are as follows:

Mayoral Candidate	Vote	%
Adam Lordon (X)	Acclaimed	

== Moncton ==
The candidates are as follows:

=== Mayor ===
Candidates

- Dawn Arnold - incumbent mayor
- Erik Gingles - runs video-news site Buzzlocal.

Mayoral Candidate	Vote	%
Dawn Arnold (X)	9,998	58.76
Erik Gingles	7,016	41.24

=== Moncton City Council ===
At large (2 to be elected)
Candidate	Vote	%
Monique LeBlanc	6,686	21.96
Marty Kingston	6,645	21.83
Yves Belliveau	4,673	15.35
Krysta Cowling	4,427	14.54
Isabelle Forest	3,372	11.08
Craig McCluskey	2,718	8.93
Hafsah Ayub Mohammad	1,920	6.31
Ward 1 (2 to be elected)
Candidate	Vote	%
Shawn Crossman (X)	2,531	33.76
Paulette Thériualt (X)	1,532	20.43
Patrick Richard	1,451	19.35
Réal Allain	1,115	14.87
Dan Ross	869	11.59
Ward 2 (2 to be elected)
Candidate	Vote	%
Charles Léger (X)	1,472	20.19
Daniel Bourgeois	1,339	18.36
Bettina Moores	1,331	18.25
Blair Lawrence (X)	1,323	18.14
Jeff Wallace	1,022	14.02
Peter Colwell	805	11.04
Ward 3 (2 to be elected)
Candidate	Vote	%
Bryan D. Butler (X)	2,447	30.69
Dave Steeves	2,131	26.73
Tamara Nichol	2,081	26.10
Diani Blanco	1,313	16.47
Ward 4 (2 to be elected)
Candidate	Vote	%
Paul Richard	2,779	40.83
Susan F. Edgett (X)	2,249	33.65
Paul Pellerin (X)	1,706	25.52

== Oromocto ==
The candidates for mayor are as follows:

Mayoral Candidate	Vote	%
Robert Edward Powell (X)	Acclaimed	

== Quispamsis ==
The candidates for mayor are as follows:

Mayoral Candidate	Vote	%
Libby O'Hara	3,790	84.39
Gary D. Clark (X)	701	15.61

== Riverview ==
The candidates for mayor are as follows:

Mayoral Candidate	Vote	%
Andrew J. LeBlanc	3,235	53.79
Tammy L. Rampersaud	2,779	46.21

== Rothesay ==
The candidates for mayor are as follows:

Mayoral Candidate	Vote	%
Nancy E. Grant (X)	3,020	92.19
Elizabeth Kramer	256	7.81

== Sackville ==
The candidates for mayor are as follows:

Mayoral Candidate	Vote	%
Shawn Mesheau	1,067	55.43
Ron Aiken	858	44.57

== Saint John ==
The candidates are as follows:

=== Mayor ===
Candidates

- Darrell Bastarache - Landscaper, noted for his controversial statements and support for conspiracy theories.
- Donna Reardon - Ward 3 councillor, dietitian and medical administrator.
- Mel Vincent Jr. - Home builder and real estate broker. Son of longtime councillor Mel Vincent Sr. Ran for the Progressive Conservative Party of New Brunswick in the 2003 provincial election.
- Howard Yeomans - Retired accountant. Ran for mayor in 2016, finishing last with 213 votes.

Results

Mayoral Candidate	Vote	%
Donna E. Reardon	10,089	60.19
Mel A. W. Vincent	5,895	35.17
Darrell Bastarache	467	2.79
Howard A. Yeomans	312	1.86

=== Saint John City Council ===
At large (2 to be elected)
Candidate	Vote	%
Brent Harris	8,487	31.93
H. Gary Sullivan (X)	6,963	26.20
Dean M. Secord	3,461	13.02
Neil S. Clements	2,935	11.04
Arty Watson	1,909	7.18
Steven Henderson	1,438	5.41
Anthony Capson	909	3.42
Guy Verna	479	1.80
Ward 1 (2 to be elected)
Candidate	Vote	%
Greg Norton (X)	2,861	32.62
Joanna F. E. Killen	1,941	22.13
Blake Armstrong (X)	1,566	17.85
Richard Lee	1,519	17.32
Sean Patrick Crowley	630	7.18
Steven J. Woodin	135	1.54
Christopher R. Withers	120	1.37
Ward 2 (2 to be elected)
Candidate	Vote	%
Barry Ogden	1,760	23.51
John MacKenzie (X)	1,249	16.69
Jocelyn M. Stevens	900	12.02
Patty Higgins	691	9.23
Jacob W. Stackhouse	636	8.50
Jason L. Alcorn	485	6.48
Deborah Dianne McCormack	373	4.98
Tamara L. Steele	336	4.49
Conor Vienneau	279	3.73
Jerald H. Kunitzky	196	2.62
Russell Wilson	194	2.59
Justin B. Tinker	142	1.90
Larry E. Harlow	133	1.78
Tim Little	111	1.48
Ward 3 (2 to be elected)
Candidate	Vote	%
Gerry Lowe	1,540	27.11
David Hickey (X)	1,532	26.97
Mariah A. Darling	1,460	25.70
Frank James	418	7.36
Barbara Ellemberg	309	5.44
Adam J. C. Salesse	202	3.56
Peter Duncan	118	2.08
Jordan R. Hollingsworth	101	1.78
Ward 4 (2 to be elected)
Candidate	Vote	%
Greg R. Stewart	1,141	15.19
Paula Radwan	1,128	15.02
Gina E. Hooley	1,120	14.91
Ray Stowbridge (X)	1,022	13.60
Bruce P. Court	620	8.25
Dan O'Connor	600	7.99
Daryl Ronald Bishop	538	7.16
Kimberley Mary Hughes	533	7.10
Lynaya L. Astephen	405	5.39
Christopher C. Daigle	405	5.39

==== By-election ====
A by-election was held in Ward 3 on December 9, 2024, following the election of David Hickey in the 2024 New Brunswick general election:

Results:

Candidate	Vote	%
Mariah Darling	375	32.02
Ryan Moore	269	22.97
Adam Donnelly	114	9.74
Kevin M. McCann	114	9.74
Andrew Miller	70	5.98
Lisa Morris	67	5.72
P.J. Duncan	45	3.84
Bryan Wilson	44	3.76
Arty Watson	36	3.07
Jennifer Thompson	24	2.05
Dan Benoit	13	1.11

== Shediac ==
The candidates for mayor are as follows:

Mayoral Candidate	Vote	%
Roger Caissie (X)	1,716	59.85
Léo Doiron	1,151	40.15

== Tracadie ==
The candidates for mayor are as follows:

Mayoral Candidate	Vote	%
Denis Losier (X)	5,637	69.22
Jean-Yves McGraw	2,507	30.78

== Woodstock ==
The candidates for mayor are as follows:

Mayoral Candidate	Vote	%
Arthur L. Slipp (X)	Acclaimed	

== See also ==
- Administrative divisions of New Brunswick
- Elections in Canada
