= Fredericton City Council =

Type
- Type: City council

History
- Founded: March 30, 1848

Leadership
- Mayor of Fredericton: Kate Rogers, non-partisan since May 10, 2021
- Deputy Mayor of Fredericton: Greg Ericson, non-partisan

Structure
- Seats: 13
- Fredericton Council Chamber committees: Development Committee, Community Services Committee, Finance and Administration Committee, Information Technology Committee, Planning and Priorities Committee, Public Safety and Environment Committee, Transportation, Planning Advisory Committee, Preservation Review Board, Riverfront Advisory Committee, Tree Commission, Working Committee on Community/University Relations
- Length of term: 4 years

Elections
- Last election: May 10, 2021

Meeting place
- Fredericton Council Chamber; Fredericton City Hall; Fredericton, New Brunswick

Website
- www.fredericton.ca/en/citygovernment/CityCouncil.asp

Fredericton City Council is the municipal governing body of the city of Fredericton, New Brunswick, Canada.

The twelve members of the mayor-council meets at Fredericton City Hall in the Fredericton Council Chamber. Each member is elected for a four-year term to represent one ward.

== Current City Council (elected in 2021) ==
Councillor	Ward
Kate Rogers	Mayor
Margo Sheppard	1
Mark Peters	2
Bruce Gandy	3
Jocelyn Pike	4
Steven Hicks	5
Eric Megarity	6
Kevin Darrah	7
Greg Ericson	8
Ruth Breen	9
Cassandra M. Blackmore	10
Jason LeJeune	11
Henri Mallet	12
