= Alban Landry =

Canadian politician

Member of the New Brunswick Legislative Assembly for Nepisiguit
- In office September 11, 1995 – June 7, 1999
- Preceded by: Frank Branch
- Succeeded by: Joel Bernard

Personal details
- Born: October 17, 1934 Bathurst, New Brunswick, Canada
- Died: August 4, 2013 (aged 78) Beresford, New Brunswick, Canada
- Party: Liberal
- Occupation: Training officer

Alban Landry (October 17, 1934 – August 4, 2013) was a politician in the province of New Brunswick, Canada. He was elected to the Legislative Assembly of New Brunswick in 1995 and defeated for re-election by Joel Bernard in 1999.

He represented the electoral district of Nepisiguit.
