= Fredericton-Silverwood =

Defunct provincial electoral district in New Brunswick, Canada

New Brunswick electoral district
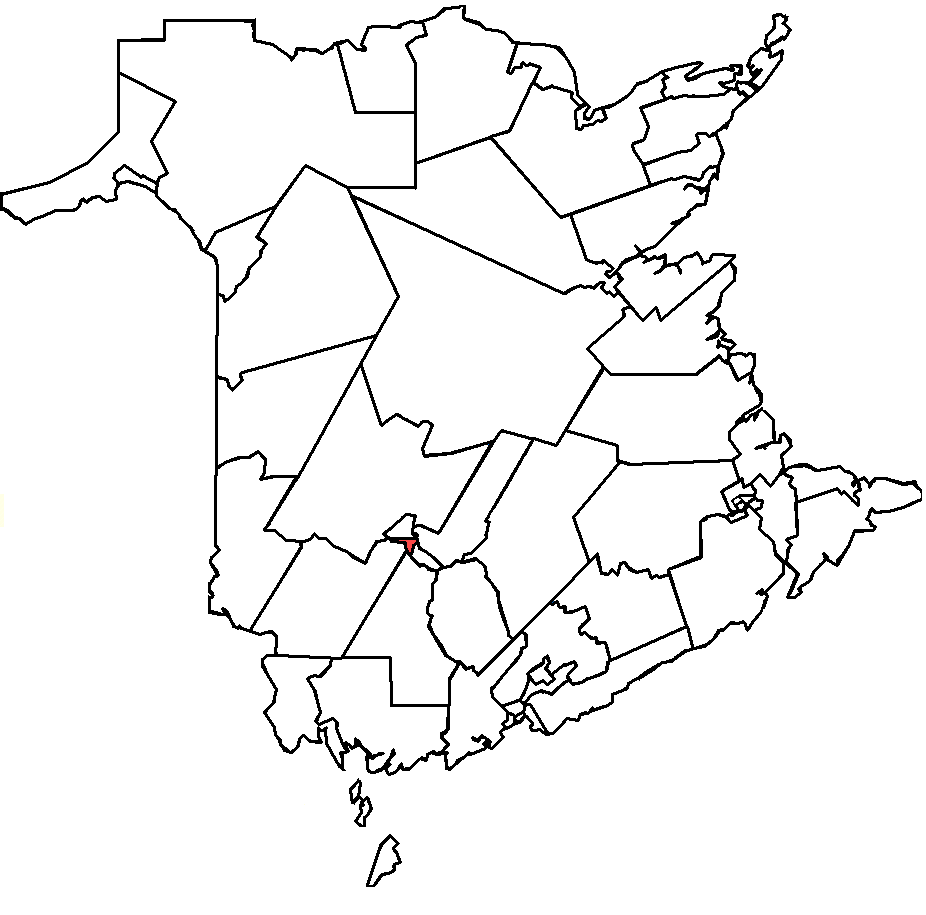
- Coordinates: 45.949°N 66.669°W

Defunct provincial electoral district
- Legislature: Legislative Assembly of New Brunswick
- District created: 1973
- District abolished: 2013
- First contested: 1974
- Last contested: 2010

Demographics
- Population (2001): 13,977
- Electors: 11,846
- Census division: York County
- Census subdivision: Fredericton

Fredericton-Silverwood was a provincial electoral district for the Legislative Assembly of New Brunswick, Canada. It was first created using the name Fredericton South in the 1973 redrawing of electoral districts by splitting the two-member district of Fredericton and was first used in the 1974 general election. Its name was changed to Fredericton-Silverwood in the 2006 redrawing of electoral districts. The riding was split in two along Smythe Street in the 2013 redistribution, with half of the riding going to Fredericton South and half to Fredericton West-Hanwell.

== History ==
It was created in 1973 as Fredericton South and included those portions of the old multi-member district of Fredericton south of the Saint John River. It lost eastern territory in the 1994 electoral redistribution to the new district of Fredericton-Fort Nashwaak and again lost eastern territory in 2006 this time to the new district of Fredericton-Lincoln. Its name was changed in 2006 to Fredericton-Silverwood to prevent confusion among city residents who would identify with "Fredericton South" as residents of the south side of the Saint John River, many of whom were not in the district.

The district was a bellwether, having been won by the governing party in every general election from its creation through its abolishment.

== Members of the Legislative Assembly ==
Assembly	Years	Member	Party
Fredericton South; Riding created from Fredericton
48th	1974–1978	George Everett Chalmers	Progressive Conservative
49th	1978–1982	Bud Bird	Progressive Conservative
50th	1982–1987	Dave Clark	Progressive Conservative
51st	1987–1991	Russ King	Liberal
52nd	1991–1995	Russ King	Liberal
53rd	1995–1998	Russ King	Liberal
53rd	1998–1999	Brad Green	Progressive Conservative
54th	1999–2003	Brad Green	Progressive Conservative
55th	2003–2006	Brad Green	Progressive Conservative
Fredericton-Silverwood
56th	2006–2010	Rick Miles	Liberal
57th	2010–2014	Brian Macdonald	Progressive Conservative
Riding dissolved into Fredericton South, Fredericton West-Hanwell and New Maryland-Sunbury

== Election results ==
=== Fredericton-Silverwood ===
2010 New Brunswick general election
Party	Candidate	Votes	%	±%
Progressive Conservative	Brian Macdonald	2,955	38.50	-2.47
Liberal	Rick Miles	2,507	32.66	-14.78
New Democratic	Tony Myatt	1,234	16.08	+4.49
Green	Jim Wolstenholme	912	11.88	–
Independent	Jim Andrews	67	0.87	–
Total valid votes		7,675	100.0	
Total rejected ballots		37	0.48	
Turnout		7,712	67.39	
Eligible voters		11,443		
Progressive Conservative gain from Liberal		Swing		+6.16

2006 New Brunswick general election
Party	Candidate	Votes	%	±%
Liberal	Rick Miles	3,335	47.44	+12.20
Progressive Conservative	Brad Green	2,880	40.97	-0.72
New Democratic	Dennis Atchison	815	11.59	-11.49
Total valid votes		7,030	100.0	
Liberal notional gain from Progressive Conservative		Swing		+6.46

=== Fredericton South ===
2003 New Brunswick general election
Party	Candidate	Votes	%	±%
Progressive Conservative	Brad Green	3,309	41.69	-8.84
Liberal	Misty Dawn McLaughlin	2,797	35.24	+4.08
New Democratic	Nan Luke	1,832	23.08	+5.60
Total valid votes		7,938	100.0	
Progressive Conservative hold		Swing		-6.46

1999 New Brunswick general election
Party	Candidate	Votes	%	±%
Progressive Conservative	Brad Green	4,070	50.53	+5.44
Liberal	Lorraine Silliphant	2,510	31.16	-10.20
New Democratic	Myrna Gunter	1,409	17.49	+3.93
Natural Law	Michael McKay	66	0.82	–
Total valid votes		8,055	100.0	
Progressive Conservative hold		Swing		+7.82

New Brunswick provincial by-election, 1998 on the resignation of Russ King
Party	Candidate	Votes	%	±%
Progressive Conservative	Brad Green	2,295	45.09	+20.48
Liberal	Lorraine Silliphant	2,105	41.36	-10.10
New Democratic	Dick Grant	690	13.56	+0.61
Total valid votes		5,090	100.0	
Progressive Conservative gain from Liberal		Swing		+15.29

1995 New Brunswick general election
Party	Candidate	Votes	%	±%
Liberal	Russ King	4,141	51.46	+13.43
Progressive Conservative	David Peterson	1,980	24.61	+3.25
New Democratic	Myrna Gunter	1,042	12.95	+0.81
Confederation of Regions	Dave O'Brien	776	9.64	-17.70
Natural Law	Michael McKay	108	1.34	–
Total valid votes		8,047	100.0	
Liberal hold		Swing		+5.09

1991 New Brunswick general election
Party	Candidate	Votes	%	±%
Liberal	Russ King	4,584	38.03	-21.07
Confederation of Regions	Meryl Sarty	3,295	27.34	–
Progressive Conservative	Jamie Henderson	2,575	21.36	-0.02
New Democratic	Pauline MacKenzie	1,463	12.14	-6.45
Independent	Harry John Marshall	136	1.13	+0.20
Total valid votes		12,053	100.0	
Liberal hold		Swing		-24.20

1987 New Brunswick general election
Party	Candidate	Votes	%	±%
Liberal	Russ King	7,384	59.10	+21.69
Progressive Conservative	David Clark	2,672	21.38	-25.77
New Democratic	Shauna Mackenzie	2,323	18.59	+3.90
Independent	Harry John Marshall	116	0.93	+0.19
Total valid votes		12,495	100.0	
Liberal gain from Progressive Conservative		Swing		+23.73

1982 New Brunswick general election
Party	Candidate	Votes	%	±%
Progressive Conservative	Dave Clark	5,507	47.15	-5.41
Liberal	Steve Patterson	4,369	37.41	-3.07
New Democratic	Tom Good	1,716	14.69	+8.57
Independent	Harry John Marshall	87	0.74	-0.14
Total valid votes		11,679	100.0	
Progressive Conservative hold		Swing		-1.17

1978 New Brunswick general election
Party	Candidate	Votes	%	±%
Progressive Conservative	J. W. "Bud" Bird	5,525	52.56	-4.14
Liberal	Stephen Patterson	4,252	40.48	+4.53
New Democratic	Margo Dunn	643	6.12	-0.34
Independent	Harry John Marshall	92	0.88	-0.02
Total valid votes		10,512	100.0	
Progressive Conservative hold		Swing		-4.34

1974 New Brunswick general election
Party	Candidate	Votes	%
Progressive Conservative	Dr. G. Everett Chalmers	5,936	56.70
Liberal	Daniel M. Hurley	3,764	35.95
New Democratic	Douglas C. Birdwise	676	6.46
Independent	Harry John Marshall	94	0.90
Total valid votes		10,470	100.0
The previous multi-member riding of Fredericton went totally Progressive Conservative in the last election, with Everett Chalmers being one of two incumbents.

== See also ==
- List of New Brunswick provincial electoral districts
- Canadian provincial electoral districts
