= Dave Clark (Canadian politician) =

Canadian politician

David R. Clark, Q.C. is a Progressive Conservative Canadian politician. He was elected in 1982 as the Member for the Legislative Assembly of New Brunswick for the Fredericton South provincial electoral district, serving in that role until 1987. He was appointed to Cabinet in 1985 and served as Minister of Justice and Attorney-General from 1985 - 1987.

Preceded by Bud Bird	MLA for Fredericton-Silverwood; 1982–1987	Succeeded by Russell King
