= Cheryl Lavoie =

Canadian politician

Member of the New Brunswick Legislative Assembly for Nepisiguit
- In office September 18, 2006 – September 27, 2010
- Preceded by: Frank Branch
- Succeeded by: Ryan Riordon

Personal details
- Party: Liberal

Cheryl Lavoie is a politician in the province of New Brunswick, Canada. She was elected to the Legislative Assembly of New Brunswick in 2006 as the Liberal MLA for Nepisiguit. She was made minister of state for seniors and minister responsible for the Community Non-profit Organizations Secretariat in March 2010.

Preceded by Rick Miles	Chair of the Liberal caucus 2009–2010	Succeeded by Burt Paulin
