= Robert Howie (politician) =

Canadian politician

The Honourable J. Robert Howie PC

Member of the Canadian Parliament for York-Sunbury
- In office 1972–1988
- Preceded by: J. Chester MacRae
- Succeeded by: Bud Bird

Personal details
- Born: October 2, 1929 Fredericton, New Brunswick
- Died: November 25, 2017 (aged 88) Fredericton, New Brunswick
- Party: Progressive Conservative Party of Canada
- Education: University of New Brunswick

J. Robert Howie, PC (October 2, 1929 – November 25, 2017) was a Canadian politician.

== Career ==
Howie was a native of Fredericton and graduated from the University of New Brunswick. He served as a lawyer before his election to Parliament.

== Political career ==
Howie was first elected to the House of Commons of Canada in the 1972 federal election as the Progressive Conservative Member of Parliament for York—Sunbury.

After the Tories won a minority government in the 1979 federal election, Howie was appointed to Cabinet as Minister of State for Transport in the short-lived government of Prime Minister Joe Clark. He returned to the Opposition as a result of the 1980 election that defeated the Tory government.

Howie returned to the government side of the House when the Brian Mulroney Tories won the 1984 federal election but was not invited into the Cabinet. He did not run in the 1988, and retired from politics.

=== Electoral history ===
1984 Canadian federal election: Fredericton
Party	Candidate	Votes	%	±%
Progressive Conservative	Robert Howie	25,190	58.85	+11.15
Liberal	Loretta Washburn	9,873	23.06	-13.90
New Democratic	Allan Sharp	7,366	17.21	+2.66
Independent	Harry Marshall	377	0.88	+0.34
Total valid votes		42,806	100.00	

1980 Canadian federal election: Fredericton
Party	Candidate	Votes	%	±%
Progressive Conservative	Robert Howie	18,246	47.70	-7.35
Liberal	Dan Hurley	14,138	36.96	+7.02
New Democratic	Phillip Booker	5,567	14.55	+0.19
Independent	Harry Marshall	205	0.54	-0.11
Libertarian	Jay Nauss	95	0.25	Ø
Total valid votes		38,251	100.00	
lop.parl.ca

1979 Canadian federal election: Fredericton
Party	Candidate	Votes	%	±%
Progressive Conservative	Robert Howie	21,722	55.05	+4.78
Liberal	Pete Mockler	11,815	29.94	-10.32
New Democratic	Phillip Booker	5,665	14.36	+4.90
Independent	Harry Marshall	258	0.65	Ø
Total valid votes		39,460	100.00	

1974 Canadian federal election: Fredericton
Party	Candidate	Votes	%	±%
Progressive Conservative	Robert Howie	17,673	50.27	-2.70
Liberal	John McNair	14,153	40.26	+2.97
New Democratic	Kevin White	3,327	9.46	-0.27
Total valid votes		35,153	100.00	
lop.parl.ca

1972 Canadian federal election: Fredericton
Party	Candidate	Votes	%	±%
Progressive Conservative	Robert Howie	20,362	52.97	-2.42
Liberal	Ray Dixon	14,335	37.29	-4.05
New Democratic	Beverley Wallace	3,741	9.73	+6.46
Total valid votes		38,438	100.00	

== Personal life ==
Howie and his wife Nancy had four children. He died in 2017 at the age of 88.

21st Canadian Ministry (1979–1980) – Cabinet of Joe Clark
Cabinet post (1)
Predecessor	Office	Successor
	Minister of State for Transport; 1979-1980	
Parliament of Canada
Preceded by J. Chester MacRae	Member of Parliament for Fredericton; 1972-1988	Succeeded by Bud Bird
