= Fredericton—Oromocto =

Federal electoral district in New Brunswick, Canada

New Brunswick electoral district
- Interactive map of riding boundaries from the 2025 federal election
- Coordinates: 45.955°N 66.463°W

Federal electoral district
- Legislature: House of Commons
MP
David Myles
Liberal
- District created: 1914
- First contested: 1917
- Last contested: 2025
- District webpage: profile, map

Demographics
- Population (2021): 87,436
- Electors (2025): 66,234
- Area (km²): 1,499.26
- Pop. density (per km²): 58.3
- Census division(s): Sunbury, Queens, York
- Census subdivision(s): Fredericton, Oromocto, New Maryland, Devon, Oromocto

Fredericton—Oromocto (formerly known as Fredericton—York—Sunbury and simply Fredericton) is a federal electoral district in New Brunswick, Canada, that has been represented in the House of Commons of Canada since 1988. Its population in 2021 was 87,436. Its predecessor riding, York—Sunbury, was represented in the House of Commons from 1917 to 1988.

The district includes the city of Fredericton, and the town of Oromocto and vicinity.

The neighbouring ridings are Miramichi—Grand Lake, New Brunswick Southwest, and Tobique—Mactaquac.

== Demographics ==
Historical population
Year	Pop.	±%
2001	82,782	—
2006	85,886	+3.7%
2011	93,181	+8.5%

According to the 2021 Canadian census; 2023 representation

Racial groups: 83.8% White, 5.0% Indigenous, 2.4% South Asian, 2.3% Black, 1.9% Arab, 1.5% Chinese
Languages: 83.9% English, 8.9% French, 1.6% Arabic
Religions: 52.7% Christian (20.6% Catholic, 6.3% Baptist, 6.0% United Church, 5.6% Anglican, 1.6% Pentecostal, 12.6% Other), 2.9% Muslim, 1.1% Hindu, 41.4% No religion
Median income (2020): $42,000
Average income (2020): $51,700

== History ==
"York—Sunbury" riding was created in 1914 from parts of Sunbury—Queen's and York ridings. Previously, York County was its own riding and Sunbury County was joined with Queens County.

The riding was named after York and Sunbury counties of which it was composed.

In 1987, York—Sunbury was abolished. Some rural areas in the southern parts of the riding were transferred to Carleton—Charlotte riding, and a largely uninhabited area, moved to Miramichi. The remainder was incorporated into "Fredericton" riding. It was renamed "Fredericton—York—Sunbury" shortly after the 1988 election.

Fredericton-York-Sudbury was abolished in 1996 when more rural areas were moved into other districts (particularly Tobique—Mactaquac and New Brunswick Southwest, and a new riding named "Fredericton" was created. The Minto and Chipman areas were added to the riding in 2003. As per the 2012 federal electoral redistribution, this riding will lost territory to Miramichi—Grand Lake, New Brunswick Southwest and Tobique—Mactaquac, and gained some land from New Brunswick Southwest.

In the 2008 election, the Conservatives gained this seat from the Liberals. The Conservatives were strongest in the rural parts of this riding, outside of Fredericton proper. Within the city, the Liberals still held their own with the NDP capturing a handful of polls, including the University of New Brunswick, and a couple along Parkside Drive.

In the 2019 election, the riding got its first-ever "third party" MP from the Greens. Jenica Atwin won the seat from the former incumbent Liberal MP, Matt DeCourcey, who came third behind the Conservative candidate.

Following the 2022 Canadian federal electoral redistribution, the riding was renamed Fredericton—Oromocto. Its border with Tobique—Mactaquac was rerouted to follow the northern border of the City of Fredericton (2023 borders), and it lost the remainder of the Parishes of Maugerville, Sheffield and Canning to Miramichi—Grand Lake; and lost Burton Parish to Saint John—St. Croix, except for those parts of the parish that were transferred to the Town of Oromocto in 2023.

== Federal riding associations ==
Riding associations are the local branches of the national political parties:

Party	Association name	CEO	HQ city
Conservative Party of Canada	Fredericton—Oromocto Conservative Association	Ian Douglas Baird	Fredericton
Green Party of Canada	Fredericton—Oromocto Green Party Association	Anthea M. Plummer	Fredericton
Liberal Party of Canada	Fredericton—Oromocto Federal Liberal Association	Noreen M. Bonnell	Fredericton
New Democratic Party	Fredericton—Oromocto Federal NDP Riding Association	Shannon Cruickshank	Ottawa, Ontario

== Members of Parliament ==
This riding has elected the following members of Parliament:

Parliament	Years	Member	Party
York—Sunbury; Riding created from Sunbury—Queen's and York
13th	1917–1921	Harry Fulton McLeod	Government (Unionist)
13th	1921–1921	Richard Hanson	Conservative
14th	1921–1925	Richard Hanson	Conservative
15th	1925–1926	Richard Hanson	Conservative
16th	1926–1930	Richard Hanson	Conservative
17th	1930–1935	Richard Hanson	Conservative
18th	1935–1940	William George Clark	Liberal
19th	1940–1945	Richard Hanson	National Government
20th	1945–1947	Hedley Francis Gregory Bridges	Liberal
20th	1947–1949	Milton Fowler Gregg	Liberal
21st	1949–1953	Milton Fowler Gregg	Liberal
22nd	1953–1957	Milton Fowler Gregg	Liberal
23rd	1957–1958	John Chester MacRae	Progressive Conservative
24th	1958–1962	John Chester MacRae	Progressive Conservative
25th	1962–1963	John Chester MacRae	Progressive Conservative
26th	1963–1965	John Chester MacRae	Progressive Conservative
27th	1965–1968	John Chester MacRae	Progressive Conservative
28th	1968–1972	John Chester MacRae	Progressive Conservative
29th	1972–1974	Robert Howie	Progressive Conservative
30th	1974–1979	Robert Howie	Progressive Conservative
31st	1979–1980	Robert Howie	Progressive Conservative
32nd	1980–1984	Robert Howie	Progressive Conservative
33rd	1984–1988	Robert Howie	Progressive Conservative
Fredericton
34th	1988–1993	Bud Bird	Progressive Conservative
Fredericton—York—Sunbury
35th	1993–1997	Andy Scott	Liberal
Fredericton
36th	1997–2000	Andy Scott	Liberal
37th	2000–2004	Andy Scott	Liberal
38th	2004–2006	Andy Scott	Liberal
39th	2006–2008	Andy Scott	Liberal
40th	2008–2011	Keith Ashfield	Conservative
41st	2011–2015	Keith Ashfield	Conservative
42nd	2015–2019	Matt DeCourcey	Liberal
43rd	2019–2021	Jenica Atwin	Green
43rd	2021–2021	Jenica Atwin	Liberal
44th	2021–2025	Jenica Atwin	Liberal
45th	2025–present	David Myles	Liberal

== Election results ==
=== Fredericton–Oromocto ===
==== 2025 ====
2025 Canadian federal election
Party	Candidate	Votes	%	±%	Expenditures
Liberal	David Myles	30,750	61.29	+23.51	$104,116.35
Conservative	Brian Macdonald	16,200	32.29	-2.22	$101,916.42
Green	Pam Allen-Leblanc	1,568	3.13	-9.76	$64,109.83
New Democratic	Nicki Lyons-MacFarlane	908	1.81	-11.19	$304.25
Canadian Future	Dominic Cardy	345	0.69	N/A	$737.30
People's	Heather Michaud	208	0.41	+0.07	$18.03
Communist	June Patterson	146	0.29	-0.05	$0.00
Centrist	Brandon Ellis	44	0.09	N/A	$711.00
Total valid votes		50,169	99.52	+0.17	$120,219.77
Total rejected ballots		243	0.48	–0.17	
Turnout		50,412	75.75	+9.84	
Eligible voters (Note: Number of eligible voters does not include election day registrations.)		66,550			
Liberal notional hold		Swing		+12.86	
Source: Elections Canada

2021 federal election redistributed results
Party	Vote	%
Liberal	16,012	37.79
Conservative	14,624	34.51
New Democratic	5,508	13.00
Green	5,461	12.89
Independent	276	0.65
Libertarian	204	0.48
Communist	146	0.34
People's	144	0.34
Total valid votes	42,375	99.35
Rejected ballots	278	0.65
Registered voters/ estimated turnout	64,711	65.91

=== Fredericton, 1997-present ===
==== 2021 ====
2021 Canadian federal election: Fredericton
Party	Candidate	Votes	%	±%	Expenditures
Liberal	Jenica Atwin	16,316	37.03	+9.62	$74,982.23
Conservative	Andrea Johnson	15,814	35.89	+5.51	$60,825.30
Green	Nicole O'Byrne	5,666	12.86	-20.82	$91,899.74
New Democratic	Shawn Oldenburg	5,564	12.63	+6.67	$1,870.60
Independent	Jen Smith	310	0.70	N/A	none listed
Libertarian	Brandon Kirby	234	0.53	+0.28	$0.00
Communist	June Patterson	158	0.36	+0.20	$0.00
Total valid votes/expense limit		44,062	100.00	–	$104,943.51
Total rejected ballots		301			
Turnout		44,363	66.72	-7.92	
Registered voters		66,043			
Liberal gain from Green		Swing		+15.22	
Source: Elections Canada

==== 2019 ====
2019 Canadian federal election: Fredericton
Party	Candidate	Votes	%	±%	Expenditures
Green	Jenica Atwin	16,640	33.68	+21.26	$55,541.51
Conservative	Andrea Johnson	15,011	30.38	+1.96	$81,269.70
Liberal	Matt DeCourcey	13,544	27.41	−21.85	$82,534.73
New Democratic	Mackenzie Thomason	2,946	5.96	−3.93	$1,197.20
People's	Jason Paull	776	1.57	New	$1,322.69
Animal Protection	Lesley Thomas	286	0.58	New	$2,894.40
Libertarian	Brandon Kirby	126	0.26	New	$965.26
Communist	Jacob Patterson	80	0.16	New	$476.56
Total valid votes/expense limit		49,409	99.39		$101,795.92
Total rejected ballots		301	0.61	+0.20	
Turnout		49,710	74.63	−1.10	
Eligible voters		66,606			
Green gain from Liberal		Swing		+9.65	
Source: Elections Canada

==== 2015 ====
2015 Canadian federal election: Fredericton
Party	Candidate	Votes	%	±%	Expenditures
Liberal	Matt DeCourcey	23,016	49.26	+25.24	$98,991.33
Conservative	Keith Ashfield	13,280	28.42	-18.55	$79,507.14
Green	Mary Lou Babineau	5,804	12.42	+8.27	$159,022.44
New Democratic	Sharon Scott-Levesque	4,622	9.89	-14.41	–
Total valid votes/expense limit		46,722	100.0		$195,873.36
Total rejected ballots		188	0.40	–	
Turnout		46,910	77.43	–	
Eligible voters		60,587			
Liberal gain from Conservative		Swing		+21.90	
Source: Elections Canada

2011 federal election redistributed results
Party	Vote	%
Conservative	18,213	46.97
New Democratic	9,423	24.30
Liberal	9,314	24.02
Green	1,609	4.15
Others	213	0.55

==== 2011 ====
2011 Canadian federal election: Fredericton
Party	Candidate	Votes	%	±%	Expenditures
Conservative	Keith Ashfield	21,573	48.38	+5.85	$80,569.94
New Democratic	Jesse Travis	10,626	23.83	+8.47	$8,535.27
Liberal	Randy McKeen	10,336	23.18	-8.35	$53,834.28
Green	Louise Comeau	1,790	4.01	-6.15	$8,177.72
Independent	Adam Scott Ness	266	0.60	–	$101.69
Total valid votes/expense limit		44,591	100.0		$83,547.51
Total rejected, unmarked and declined ballots		207	0.46	-0.11	
Turnout		44,798	64.24	+2.11	
Eligible voters		69,732			
Conservative hold		Swing		-1.31	

==== 2008 ====
2008 Canadian federal election: Fredericton
Party	Candidate	Votes	%	±%	Expenditures
Conservative	Keith Ashfield	17,962	42.53	+7.87	$73,954.11
Liberal	David Innes	13,319	31.53	-10.27	$64,776.23
New Democratic	Jesse Travis	6,490	15.36	-5.89	$6,944.89
Green	Mary Lou Babineau	4,293	10.16	+8.28	$8,526.99
Canadian Action	Ben Kelly	168	0.39	–	none listed
Total valid votes/expense limit		42,232	100.0		$80,195
Total rejected, unmarked and declined ballots		242	0.57	+0.13	
Turnout		42,474	62.13	-5.86	
Eligible voters		68,368			
Conservative gain from Liberal		Swing		+9.07	

==== 2006 ====
2006 Canadian federal election: Fredericton
Party	Candidate	Votes	%	±%	Expenditures
Liberal	Andy Scott	19,649	41.80	-4.95	$63,544.32
Conservative	Pat Lynch	16,292	34.66	+1.18	$57,563.68
New Democratic	John Carty	9,988	21.25	+3.89	$33,143.96
Green	Philip Duchastel	884	1.88	-0.47	none listed
Independent	David Raymond Amos	198	0.42	–	none listed
Total valid votes/expense limit		47,011	100.0		$75,043
Total rejected, unmarked and declined ballots		207	0.44		
Turnout		47,218	67.99		
Eligible voters		69,453			
Liberal hold		Swing		-3.06	

==== 2004 ====
2004 Canadian federal election: Fredericton
Party	Candidate	Votes	%	±%	Expenditures
Liberal	Andy Scott	19,819	46.75	+8.97	$60,726.40
Conservative	Kent Fox	14,193	33.48	-21.22	$61,658.27
New Democratic	John Carty	7,360	17.36	+10.41	$21,188.88
Green	Daron Letts	997	2.35	–	$1,194.22
Total valid votes/expense limit		42,396	100.0		$73,437
Total rejected, unmarked and declined ballots		264	0.62		
Turnout		42,633	61.82		
Eligible voters		68,968			
Liberal notional hold		Swing		+15.10	
Changes from 2000 are based on redistributed results. Conservative Party change is based on the combination of Canadian Alliance and Progressive Conservative Party totals.

2000 federal election redistributed results
Party	Vote	%
Liberal	15,151	37.78
Progressive Conservative	12,185	30.38
Alliance	9,753	24.32
New Democratic	2,787	6.95
Others	228	0.57

==== 2000 ====
2000 Canadian federal election: Fredericton
Party	Candidate	Votes	%	±%
Liberal	Andy Scott	14,175	38.60	+4.48
Progressive Conservative	Raj Venugopal	10,919	29.73	-0.44
Alliance	Allan Neill	8,814	24.00	+2.24
New Democratic	Michael Dunn	2,584	7.04	-6.02
Natural Law	William Parker	233	0.63	-0.26
Total valid votes		36,725	100.00	
Rejected ballots		213	0.58	
Turnout		36,938	62.8	

Change for the Canadian Alliance is based on the 1997 results of its predecessors, the Reform Party.

==== 1997 ====
1997 Canadian federal election: Fredericton
Party	Candidate	Votes	%	±%
Liberal	Andy Scott	12,252	34.12	-12.54
Progressive Conservative	Cleveland Allaby	10,835	30.17	+0.95
Reform	Mark McCready	7,815	21.76	+4.74
New Democratic	Patricia Hughes	4,689	13.06	+8.06
Natural Law	Jeanne Geldart	321	0.89	+0.07
Total valid votes		35,912	100.00	

Change from 1993 is not based on redistributed results.

=== Fredericton—York—Sunbury, 1989–1997 ===
1993 Canadian federal election: Fredericton
Party	Candidate	Votes	%	±%
Liberal	Andy Scott	21,868	46.66	+6.94
Progressive Conservative	Bud Bird	13,696	29.22	-13.76
Reform	Jack Lamey	7,977	17.02	Ø
New Democratic	Pauline MacKenzie	2,343	5.00	-5.32
Natural Law	Neil Dickie	382	0.82	Ø
Canada Party	Steven Gillrie	373	0.80	Ø
Independent	Doreen Fraser	226	0.48	-5.30
Total valid votes		46 865	100.00	

Doreen Fraser was nominated as a Confederation of Regions candidate, but was listed as an Independent because that party did not run enough candidates to be officially recognized.

=== Fredericton, 1987–1989 ===
1988 Canadian federal election: Fredericton
Party	Candidate	Votes	%	±%
Progressive Conservative	Bud Bird	20,494	42.98	-15.87
Liberal	Brad Woodside	18,939	39.72	+16.66
New Democratic	Allan Sharp	4,922	10.32	-6.89
Confederation of Regions	Greg Hargrove	2,755	5.78	Ø
Rhinoceros	Chris Fullerton	316	0.66	Ø
Independent	Harry Marshall	253	0.53	-0.35
Total valid votes		47,679	100.00	

=== York—Sunbury, 1917–1987 ===
1984 Canadian federal election: Fredericton
Party	Candidate	Votes	%	±%
Progressive Conservative	Robert Howie	25,190	58.85	+11.15
Liberal	Loretta Washburn	9,873	23.06	-13.90
New Democratic	Allan Sharp	7,366	17.21	+2.66
Independent	Harry Marshall	377	0.88	+0.34
Total valid votes		42,806	100.00	

1980 Canadian federal election: Fredericton
Party	Candidate	Votes	%	±%
Progressive Conservative	Robert Howie	18,246	47.70	-7.35
Liberal	Dan Hurley	14,138	36.96	+7.02
New Democratic	Phillip Booker	5,567	14.55	+0.19
Independent	Harry Marshall	205	0.54	-0.11
Libertarian	Jay Nauss	95	0.25	Ø
Total valid votes		38,251	100.00	
lop.parl.ca

1979 Canadian federal election: Fredericton
Party	Candidate	Votes	%	±%
Progressive Conservative	Robert Howie	21,722	55.05	+4.78
Liberal	Pete Mockler	11,815	29.94	-10.32
New Democratic	Phillip Booker	5,665	14.36	+4.90
Independent	Harry Marshall	258	0.65	Ø
Total valid votes		39,460	100.00	

1974 Canadian federal election: Fredericton
Party	Candidate	Votes	%	±%
Progressive Conservative	Robert Howie	17,673	50.27	-2.70
Liberal	John McNair	14,153	40.26	+2.97
New Democratic	Kevin White	3,327	9.46	-0.27
Total valid votes		35,153	100.00	
lop.parl.ca

1972 Canadian federal election: Fredericton
Party	Candidate	Votes	%	±%
Progressive Conservative	Robert Howie	20,362	52.97	-2.42
Liberal	Ray Dixon	14,335	37.29	-4.05
New Democratic	Beverley Wallace	3,741	9.73	+6.46
Total valid votes		38,438	100.00	

1968 Canadian federal election: Fredericton
Party	Candidate	Votes	%	±%
Progressive Conservative	John Chester MacRae	17,394	55.39	+6.87
Liberal	Paul Burden	12,983	41.34	-4.40
New Democratic	Patrick Callaghan	1,028	3.27	-2.47
Total valid votes		31,405	100.00	

1965 Canadian federal election: Fredericton
Party	Candidate	Votes	%	±%
Progressive Conservative	John Chester MacRae	15,813	48.52	+0.04
Liberal	Paul Burden	14,909	45.74	+0.78
New Democratic	Patrick Callaghan	1,872	5.74	+2.67
Total valid votes		32,594	100.00	

1963 Canadian federal election: Fredericton
Party	Candidate	Votes	%	±%
Progressive Conservative	John Chester MacRae	15,827	48.48	-0.11
Liberal	David Dickson	14,678	44.96	+2.09
Social Credit	George Nickerson	1,142	3.50	-1.32
New Democratic	Lovell Clark	1,001	3.07	-0.65
Total valid votes		32,648	100.00	

1962 Canadian federal election: Fredericton
Party	Candidate	Votes	%	±%
Progressive Conservative	John Chester MacRae	15,255	48.59	-4.83
Liberal	David Dickson	13,461	42.87	-1.45
Social Credit	George Nickerson	1,513	4.82	Ø
New Democratic	John Simonds	1,167	3.72	+1.46
Total valid votes		31,396	100.00	

Changes for the New Democratic Party are based on the 1958 results of its predecessor, the Cooperative Commonwealth Federation.

1958 Canadian federal election: Fredericton
Party	Candidate	Votes	%	±%
Progressive Conservative	John Chester MacRae	15,813	53.42	+3.96
Liberal	David Dickson	13,118	44.32	-3.89
Co-operative Commonwealth	Lawrence Bright	669	2.26	-0.07
Total valid votes		29,600	100.00	

1957 Canadian federal election: Fredericton
Party	Candidate	Votes	%	±%
Progressive Conservative	John Chester MacRae	13,356	49.46	+6.71
Liberal	Milton Fowler Gregg	13,018	48.21	-4.49
Co-operative Commonwealth	Lawrence Bright	628	2.33	-2.21
Total valid votes		27,002	100.00	

1953 Canadian federal election: Fredericton
Party	Candidate	Votes	%	±%
Liberal	Milton Fowler Gregg	12,888	52.70	+3.90
Progressive Conservative	Ewart Clair Atkinson	10,455	42.75	-1.91
Co-operative Commonwealth	Charles Watson	1,111	4.54	-1.99
Total valid votes		24,454	100.00	

1949 Canadian federal election: Fredericton
Party	Candidate	Votes	%	±%
Liberal	Milton Fowler Gregg	12,158	48.80	-2.47
Progressive Conservative	Ewart Clair Atkinson	11,127	44.66	+10.65
Co-operative Commonwealth	Murray Young	1,628	6.53	-8.19
Total valid votes		24,913	100.00	

By-election on 1947 On the death of Francis Bridges
Party	Candidate	Votes	%	±%
Liberal	Milton Fowler Gregg	12,237	51.27	+3.05
Progressive Conservative	Ernest William Sansom	8,119	34.01	-10.31
Co-operative Commonwealth	Murray Young	3,514	14.72	+7.27
Total valid votes		23,870	100.00	

1945 Canadian federal election: Fredericton
Party	Candidate	Votes	%	±%
Liberal	Hedley Francis Gregory Bridges	10,828	48.22	-0.68
Progressive Conservative	Ernest William Sansom	9,953	44.32	-6.78
Co-operative Commonwealth	Murray Young	1,674	7.45	Ø
Total valid votes		22,455	100.00	

1940 Canadian federal election: Fredericton
Party	Candidate	Votes	%	±%
National Government	Richard Hanson	10,352	51.10	+5.53
Liberal	Peter J. Hughes	9,908	48.90	+2.05
Total valid votes		20,260	100.00	

1935 Canadian federal election: Fredericton
Party	Candidate	Votes	%	±%
Liberal	William George Clark	9,296	46.85	+15.92
Conservative	Richard Hanson	9,042	45.57	-23.50
Reconstruction	Errol MacDonald	1,506	7.59	Ø
Total valid votes		19,844	100.00	

1930 Canadian federal election: Fredericton
Party	Candidate	Votes	%	±%
Conservative	Richard Hanson	10,166	69.07	+3.61
Liberal	Fraser Winslow	4,552	30.93	-3.61
Total valid votes		14,718	100.00	
Source: lop.parl.ca

1926 Canadian federal election: Fredericton
Party	Candidate	Votes	%	±%
Conservative	Richard Hanson	8,451	65.46	-7.46
Liberal	Peter J. Hughes	4,459	34.54	+7.46
Total valid votes		12,910	100.00	

1925 Canadian federal election: Fredericton
Party	Candidate	Votes	%	±%
Conservative	Richard Hanson	8,636	72.92	+19.97
Liberal	Charles Robert Hawkins	3,207	27.08	-19.97
Total valid votes		11,843	100.00	

1921 Canadian federal election: Fredericton
Party	Candidate	Votes	%	±%
Conservative	Richard Hanson	7,777	52.95	-0.62
Liberal	William James Osborne	6,911	47.05	+0.62
Total valid votes		14,688	100.00	

By-election on 1921
Party	Candidate	Votes	%	±%
Conservative	Richard Hanson	7,107	53.57	-15.65
Liberal	Ernest W. Stairs	6,160	46.43	+15.65
Total valid votes		13,267	100.00	

1917 Canadian federal election: Fredericton
Party	Candidate	Votes	%
Government (Unionist)	Harry Fulton McLeod	6,957	69.22
Liberal	Nelson Brown	3,093	30.78
Total valid votes		10,050	100.00

== Student vote results ==
=== 2011 ===
In 2011, a student vote was conducted at participating Canadian schools to parallel the 2011 Canadian federal election results. The vote was designed to educate students and simulate the electoral process for persons who have not yet reached the legal majority. Schools with a large student body that reside in another electoral district had the option to vote for candidates outside of the electoral district then where they were physically located.

2011 Canadian federal election
Party	Candidate	Votes	%
New Democratic	Jesse Travis	1,067	30.02
Conservative	Keith Ashfield	1,035	29.12
Green	Louise Comeau	648	18.23
Liberal	Randy McKeen	631	17.75
Independent	Adam Scott Ness	173	4.87
Total valid votes		3,554	100.00

== See also ==
- List of Canadian electoral districts
- Historical federal electoral districts of Canada
