= Pat Callaghan (politician) =

Canadian politician (1927–2009)

Leader of the New Brunswick New Democratic Party
- In office October 16, 1971 – November 21, 1971
- Preceded by: J. Albert Richardson
- Succeeded by: J. Albert Richardson

Personal details
- Born: 1927 Scotland
- Died: January 5, 2009 (aged 81) Fredericton, New Brunswick
- Party: New Brunswick New Democratic Party
- Other political affiliations: Labour Party; Scottish National Party

Patrick Michael Callaghan (1927 – January 5, 2009) was a politician in New Brunswick, Canada who was briefly leader of the New Democratic Party of New Brunswick.

Callaghan was born in Scotland and raised in Dunbarton and the Red Clydeside area of Scotland which was known for its radicalism. As a youth he joined the Scottish National Party followed by the Labour Party. In 1954, he emigrated to Halifax, Nova Scotia and then moved to New Brunswick where he settled in Fredericton, established a window cleaning business, and joined the province's Co-operative Commonwealth Federation which became the New Democratic Party in 1962.

He was a candidate for the federal NDP in 1965 and 1968. In 1970, he was approached by a group of young radical socialists active at the University of New Brunswick and established a riding association in York—Sunbury with himself as president. The group soon became involved with the Ontario-based Waffle movement, a left wing socialist faction within the NDP and helped found the New Brunswick chapter of the Waffle in late 1970. The Waffle became a dominant force in the New Brunswick NDP in 1971 and Callaghan announced his intention to seek the party's leadership. Due to conflicts between Wafflers and anti-Wafflers over the legitimacy of the party's fall convention at which the New Brunswick Waffle manifesto had been approved, the party split into two, on October 16, 1971, with one faction led by Callaghan and a second, non-Waffle faction led by J. Albert Richardson with both men claiming to be NDP leader. The federal NDP intervened on November 12, 1971 by suspending the New Brunswick NDP and calling a special convention for November 21 to resolve the dispute. The Wafflers were demoralized by this and Callaghan spoke of leaving the NDP and reviving the CCF. Callaghan and many other Wafflers did not attend the special convention which saw the re-election of J. Albert Richardson as party leader. The Waffle declined and was inactive by the end of the year.

== Electoral history ==
1968 Canadian federal election: Fredericton
Party	Candidate	Votes	%	±%
Progressive Conservative	John Chester MacRae	17,394	55.39	+6.87
Liberal	Paul Burden	12,983	41.34	-4.40
New Democratic	Patrick Callaghan	1,028	3.27	-2.47
Total valid votes		31,405	100.00	

1965 Canadian federal election: Fredericton
Party	Candidate	Votes	%	±%
Progressive Conservative	John Chester MacRae	15,813	48.52	+0.04
Liberal	Paul Burden	14,909	45.74	+0.78
New Democratic	Patrick Callaghan	1,872	5.74	+2.67
Total valid votes		32,594	100.00	
