= Rick Miles =

Canadian politician

Member of the New Brunswick Legislative Assembly for Fredericton-Silverwood
- In office September 18, 2006 – September 27, 2010
- Preceded by: Brad Green
- Succeeded by: Brian Macdonald

Personal details
- Party: Liberal
- Occupation: Businessman

Rick Miles is a Canadian politician from New Brunswick. As a member of the Liberal Party, Miles represented the constituency of Fredericton-Silverwood in the Legislative Assembly from 2006 to 2010.

== Biography ==
A former member of the Canadian Forces, Miles was a businessman in Fredericton prior to entering politics. In the 2006 general election, Miles defeated former Brad Green, a former Progressive Conservative MLA and cabinet minister Brad Green.

On November 28, 2006, he was elected caucus chair for his Liberal Party. On July 24, 2009, he was added to the province's cabinet as Minister of Environment under premier Shawn Graham.

Miles lost his bid for re-election in the 2010 general election to Progressive Conservative candidate Brian Macdonald. In 2012, an extended conflict of interest probe into Miles ultimately concluded with the provincial conflict-of-interest commissioner declining to recommend a further investigation.

New Brunswick provincial government of Shawn Graham
Cabinet post (1)
Predecessor	Office	Successor
T. J. Burke	Minister of Environment; July 24, 2009 – October 12, 2010	Margaret-Ann Blaney
Other offices
new district	MLA for Fredericton-Silverwood; 2006–2010	Succeeded by Brian Macdonald
Preceded by Donald Arseneault	Chair of the Liberal caucus 2006–2009	Succeeded by Cheryl Lavoie
