= Milton Fowler Gregg =

Canadian politician

Brigadier The Honourable Milton Fowler Gregg VC, PC, OC, CBE, MC & Bar, ED, CD
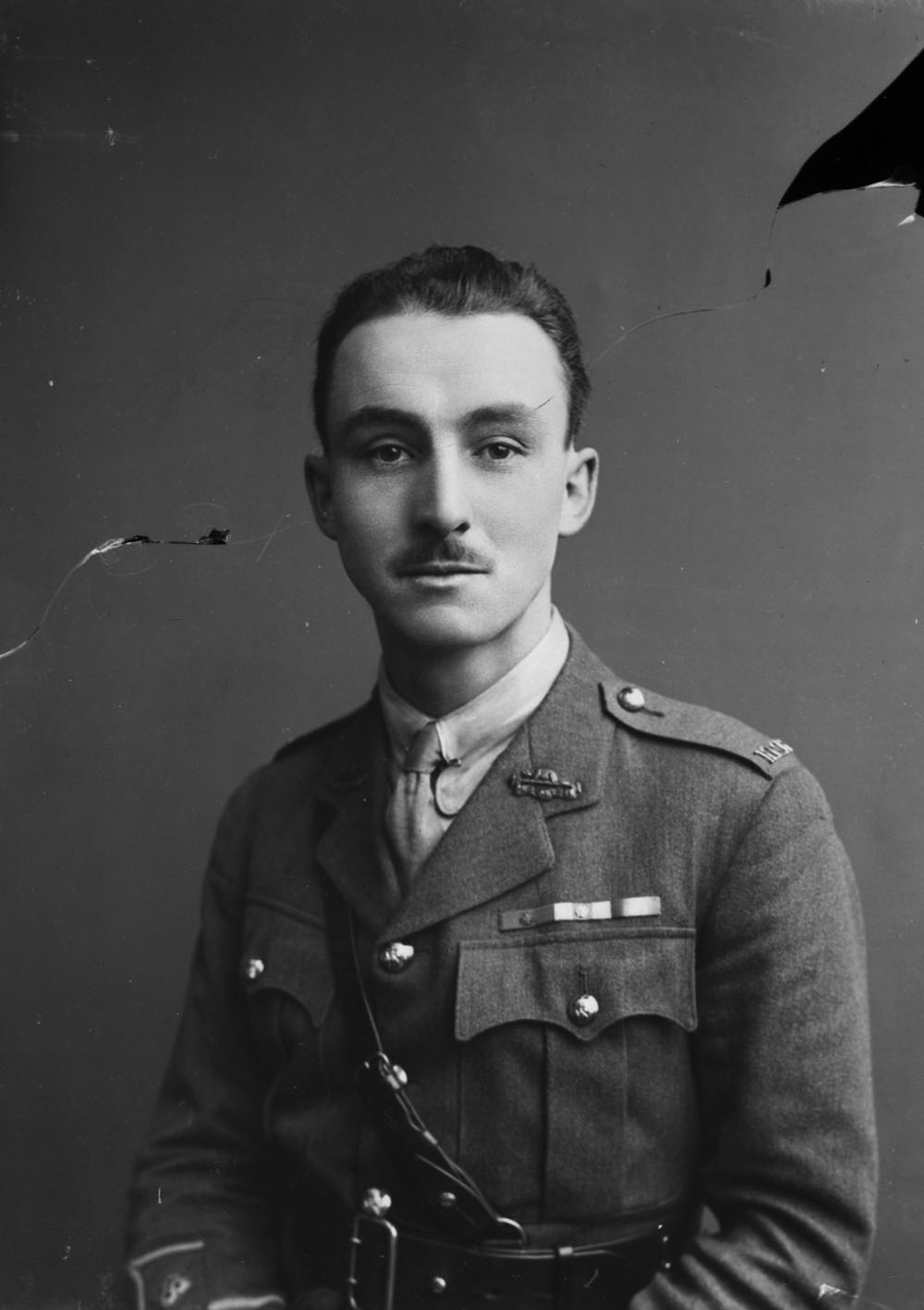
- Gregg as a junior officer in 1917.

Minister of Labour
- In office 7 August 1950 – 20 June 1957
- Prime Minister: Louis St. Laurent
- Preceded by: Paul Martin Sr. (acting)
- Succeeded by: Michael Starr

Minister of Veterans Affairs
- In office 19 January 1948 – 6 August 1950
- Prime Minister: William Lyon Mackenzie King; Louis St. Laurent
- Preceded by: Ian Alistair Mackenzie
- Succeeded by: Hugues Lapointe

Minister of Fisheries
- In office 2 September 1947 – 18 January 1948
- Prime Minister: William Lyon Mackenzie King
- Preceded by: Ernest Bertrand (acting)
- Succeeded by: James Angus MacKinnon

Member of Parliament for York—Sunbury
- In office 20 October 1947 – 10 June 1957
- Preceded by: Hedley Francis Gregory Bridges
- Succeeded by: John Chester MacRae

5th Sergeant-at-Arms of the Canadian House of Commons
- In office 1934–1944
- Clerk: Arthur Beauchesne
- Preceded by: Harry Judson Coghill
- Succeeded by: Arthur Beauchesne (acting); William John Franklin

Personal details
- Born: 10 April 1892 Kings County, New Brunswick, Canada
- Died: 13 March 1978 (aged 85) Fredericton, New Brunswick, Canada
- Resting place: Snider Mountain Baptist Church Cemetery, Snider Mountain
- Party: Liberal
- Spouse: Erica Deichmann Gregg
- Education: Acadia University

Military service
- Branch/service: Canadian Expeditionary Force
- Years of service: 1914–1943
- Rank: Brigadier
- Unit: The Royal Canadian Regiment
- Commands: West Nova Scotia Regiment
- Battles/wars: First World War; Second World War
- Awards: Victoria Cross; Officer of the Order of Canada; Commander of the Order of the British Empire; Military Cross & Bar; Canadian Efficiency Decoration; Canadian Forces' Decoration

Brigadier Milton Fowler Gregg, VC, PC, OC, CBE, MC & Bar, ED, CD (10 April 1892 – 13 March 1978) was a Canadian military officer and a First World War recipient of the Victoria Cross, the highest award for gallantry in the face of the enemy that can be awarded to British and Commonwealth forces. In later life, he was a Member of the Canadian Parliament, cabinet minister, academic, soldier and diplomat.

== Early life ==
Gregg was born in 1892 in Mountain Dale, Kings County, New Brunswick, the son of Clarissa E.(Myles) and George Lord Gregg. During the early stages of World War I he enlisted in the Canadian Army with The Black Watch (Royal Highland Regiment) of Canada in September 1914 while still studying at Acadia University. He graduated with a Master of Arts in 1916.

=== Victoria Cross ===
At the age of eighteen Gregg joined the 8th New Brunswick Hussars militia regiment. Gregg served during the First World War as a sergeant in the medical corps and later as an officer of The Royal Canadian Regiment. During combat on the Western Front in 1917, his actions earned him the Military Cross and in 1918 further valour added a bar to the Cross. Near Cambrai, Nord, France on 28 September 1918 his actions during the Battle of the Canal du Nord (part of Canada's Hundred Days) earned him the Victoria Cross.

The citation for Gregg's Victoria Cross reads:

Lt. Milton Fowler Gregg, M.C., R. Can. Regt., Nova Scotia R. – For most conspicuous bravery and initiative during operations near Cambrai, 27th September to 1st October, 1918.
On 28th September, when the advance of the brigade was held up by fire from both flanks and by thick, uncut wire, he crawled forward alone and explored the wire until he found a small gap through which he subsequently led his men and forced an entry into the enemy trench. The enemy counter-attacked in force and, through lack of bombs, the situation became critical. Although wounded Lt. Gregg returned alone under terrific fire and collected a further supply. Then rejoining his party, which by this time was much reduced in numbers, and in spite of a second wound, he reorganized his men and led them with the greatest determination against the enemy trenches, which he finally cleared. He personally killed or wounded 11 of the enemy and took 25 prisoners, in addition to 12 machine guns captured in the trench. Remaining with his company in spite of wounds he again on the 30th September led his men in attack until severely wounded. The outstanding valour of this officer saved many casualties and enabled the advance to continue.

==== Victoria Cross stolen ====
The VC awarded to Gregg, which was donated to the Royal Canadian Regiment Museum in London, Ontario, in 1979, was stolen on Canada Day (1 July 1980), when the museum was overcrowded and has been missing since. The medal set which had been placed on permanent loan to the museum by his widow Erica Deichmann Gregg included the Victoria Cross, the Order of Canada in the grade of Officer and the Military Cross with one Bar.

== Later career ==
From 1934 until 1939, Gregg was the Sergeant at Arms of the House of Commons. Following the outbreak of the Second World War in September 1939, Gregg served overseas for two years with the West Nova Scotia Regiment and then commanded officer training centres at various military facilities in Canada and retired with the rank of brigadier in 1943. In 1944, Gregg was appointed the commanding officers of CANLOAN officers at Sussex Military Camp prior to their deployment to the British Army. He was later named the first honorary president of the CANLOAN Army Officers' Association, a veterans association of CANLOAN officers.

In 1944, Gregg was appointed President of the University of New Brunswick, serving in that position until 1947 when he was elected to Parliament as Liberal member for the York-Sunbury riding. Gregg served in the cabinets of Prime Ministers William Lyon Mackenzie King and Louis St. Laurent for almost 10 years as the Minister of Fisheries, Minister of Veterans Affairs, and Minister of Labour.

Defeated in the 1957 election, Gregg went on to become the United Nations representative in Iraq, the UNICEF administrator in Indonesia, and the Canadian High Commissioner in Georgetown, British Guiana. He retired in 1968. He died on 13 March 1978 and is buried at Snider Mountain Baptist Church Cemetery in Snider Mountain, New Brunswick.

== Honours ==
Ribbon	Description	Notes
	Victoria Cross (VC)	6 January 1919
	Order of Canada (OC)	Officer; 22 December 1967; Invested 26 April 1968
	Order of the British Empire (CBE)	Commander; Military Division
	Military Cross (MC)	With 1 Bar
	1914–15 Star	
	British War Medal	
	WWI Victory Medal	
	Defence Medal	
	Canadian Volunteer Service Medal	With Overseas Clasp
	War Medal	
	King George V Silver Jubilee Medal	6 May 1935
	King George VI Coronation Medal	12 May 1937
	Queen Elizabeth II Coronation Medal	2 June 1953
	Canadian Centennial Medal	1 July 1967
	Queen Elizabeth II Silver Jubilee Medal	6 February 1977; Both British and Canadian Versions
	Volunteer Long Service Medal for India and the Colonies	
	Canadian Efficiency Decoration (ED)	
	Canadian Forces Decoration (CD)	
	Commissionaires Long Service Medal	

- Gregg was sworn into the King's Privy Council for Canada on 2 September 1947 by the Governor General of Canada FM Rt Hon Lord Alexander of Tunis on the advice of Canadian Prime Minister Rt Hon William Lyon Mackenzie King. This gave him the Honorific Title "The Honourable" and the Post Nominal Letters "PC" for Life.

=== Scholastic ===
Honorary degrees

Location	Date	School	Degree	Gave Commencement Address
Nova Scotia	1921	Acadia University		
British Columbia	26 October 1951	University of British Columbia	Doctor of Laws (LL.D)	Yes
Ontario	20 May 1977	Royal Military College of Canada	Doctor of Military Science (D.Sc.Mil)	Yes

== Legacy ==
After his death, the Milton Fowler Gregg VC Memorial Trust Fund Bursary was created in his name. It is offered annually to students entering the Royal Military College of Canada Division of Graduate Studies and Research.

The Mons Box Trophy was created by then Brigadier, The Honourable Milton F. Gregg, VC, CBE, OC, MC, ED, CD. It is awarded to the platoon commander who has exhibited the highest qualities of leadership and who is therefore, the junior officer most fit to command the men who have been placed in his charge. The Mons Box, a ceremonial cigar box, was presented to then Lieutenant Gregg by the Burgomaster of Mons, Belgium in November 1918. In addition, all members of the Canadian Corps who had reached the Mons area by Armistice Day were presented with a souvenir medallion of the City of Mons. Duplicates of this medallion are affixed to the box. Brigadier Gregg presented the Mons Box to 2 RCR on 1 June 1973. It has been presented annually since then to the winning platoon commander on the first appropriate battalion function after 1 June. The winner of the Mons Box is determined by a selection committee consisting of the Commanding Officer, the Adjutant, Company Commanders and any previous winners of the Mons Box serving in 2 RCR. These previous winners are no longer eligible to compete. All Subalterns, who have spent at least eight consecutive months of the previous year as a platoon commander, are eligible for the award. The Mons Box is displayed in the Officer's Awards cabinet in The Drift, in the Ortona Barracks, in CFB Gagetown. It is placed in front of the current winner during all Mess Dinners and it contains the after dinner cigars. Each winner of the Mons Box receives a souvenir trophy.

The Brigadier Milton F. Gregg, VC, Centre for the Study of War and Society was created at the University of New Brunswick in 2006 to further Canadians' knowledge about conflict, and is devoted to excellence in the study of war as a complex social phenomenon. Marc Milner is the first Director. The centre incorporates the UNB History and UNB Military and Strategic Studies Programs.

== Electoral history ==
1957 Canadian federal election: Fredericton
Party	Candidate	Votes	%	±%
Progressive Conservative	John Chester MacRae	13,356	49.46	+6.71
Liberal	Milton Fowler Gregg	13,018	48.21	-4.49
Co-operative Commonwealth	Lawrence Bright	628	2.33	-2.21
Total valid votes		27,002	100.00	

1953 Canadian federal election: Fredericton
Party	Candidate	Votes	%	±%
Liberal	Milton Fowler Gregg	12,888	52.70	+3.90
Progressive Conservative	Ewart Clair Atkinson	10,455	42.75	-1.91
Co-operative Commonwealth	Charles Watson	1,111	4.54	-1.99
Total valid votes		24,454	100.00	

1949 Canadian federal election: Fredericton
Party	Candidate	Votes	%	±%
Liberal	Milton Fowler Gregg	12,158	48.80	-2.47
Progressive Conservative	Ewart Clair Atkinson	11,127	44.66	+10.65
Co-operative Commonwealth	Murray Young	1,628	6.53	-8.19
Total valid votes		24,913	100.00	

By-election on 1947 On the death of Francis Bridges
Party	Candidate	Votes	%	±%
Liberal	Milton Fowler Gregg	12,237	51.27	+3.05
Progressive Conservative	Ernest William Sansom	8,119	34.01	-10.31
Co-operative Commonwealth	Murray Young	3,514	14.72	+7.27
Total valid votes		23,870	100.00	
