= Andy Scott (politician) =

Canadian politician

The Honourable Andy Scott PC

Member of Parliament for Fredericton
- In office October 25, 1993 – October 14, 2008
- Preceded by: Bud Bird
- Succeeded by: Keith Ashfield

Personal details
- Born: Robert Andrew Keith Scott; March 16, 1955 Fredericton, New Brunswick
- Died: June 24, 2013 (aged 58) Fredericton, New Brunswick
- Party: Liberal
- Spouse: Denise Cameron Scott
- Children: 3
- Profession: public servant

Robert Andrew Keith Scott PC (March 16, 1955 – June 24, 2013) was a Liberal Member of Parliament who represented the electoral district of Fredericton from 1993 to 2008. He was a member the Cabinet of Canada, most recently serving as the eighteenth Minister of Indian Affairs and Northern Development (2004–2006).

== Early life ==
Scott was born in 1955 in Fredericton, New Brunswick, and grew up in Barker's Point, a working-class neighbourhood. He was the only son in a family of four children. His parents both supported the Liberal Party, with his father especially an avid volunteer. The family business involved making cement blocks and fireplaces for houses. His father also volunteered for a summer camp for disabled children.

== Political career ==
In the late 1980s, he was a senior civil servant with the provincial Liberal government of Frank McKenna. He ran in the 1993 federal election and won convincingly, becoming the first Liberal MP elected in Fredericton since 1957.

He was re-elected in the 1997 election and was named Solicitor General of Canada. In 1998, New Democratic Party MP Dick Proctor said he overheard Scott on an airplane talking about several sensitive national matters, including the then-ongoing Vancouver Asia-Pacific Economic Cooperation (APEC) inquiry. Scott was alleged to have stated that several Royal Canadian Mounted Police (RCMP) officers (who had used pepper spray against protesters) would take the blame at the end of it all. He denied prejudging the outcome, but later resigned his post as Solicitor General.

In an incident in the fall of 2003, Scott was hospitalised after being physically assaulted by a constituent angry over his government's support for same-sex marriage.

Scott returned to the Cabinet in December 2003, when he was named Minister of State for Infrastructure by Paul Martin. Following the 2004 federal election, he was promoted to the position of Minister of Indian Affairs and Northern Development.

On March 5, 2007, he announced that he would not seek re-election in the 2008 federal election.

== After politics ==
On October 22, 2008, it was announced that Andy Scott would assume a research post in social policy at the University of New Brunswick.

== Death ==
Scott died of cancer on June 24, 2013, at the age of 58, from non-Hodgkin lymphoma.

== Electoral history ==
2006 Canadian federal election: Fredericton
Party	Candidate	Votes	%	±%	Expenditures
Liberal	Andy Scott	19,649	41.80	-4.95	$63,544.32
Conservative	Pat Lynch	16,292	34.66	+1.18	$57,563.68
New Democratic	John Carty	9,988	21.25	+3.89	$33,143.96
Green	Philip Duchastel	884	1.88	-0.47	none listed
Independent	David Raymond Amos	198	0.42	–	none listed
Total valid votes/expense limit		47,011	100.0		$75,043
Total rejected, unmarked and declined ballots		207	0.44		
Turnout		47,218	67.99		
Eligible voters		69,453			
Liberal hold		Swing		-3.06	

2004 Canadian federal election: Fredericton
Party	Candidate	Votes	%	±%	Expenditures
Liberal	Andy Scott	19,819	46.75	+8.97	$60,726.40
Conservative	Kent Fox	14,193	33.48	-21.22	$61,658.27
New Democratic	John Carty	7,360	17.36	+10.41	$21,188.88
Green	Daron Letts	997	2.35	–	$1,194.22
Total valid votes/expense limit		42,396	100.0		$73,437
Total rejected, unmarked and declined ballots		264	0.62		
Turnout		42,633	61.82		
Eligible voters		68,968			
Liberal notional hold		Swing		+15.10	
Changes from 2000 are based on redistributed results. Conservative Party change is based on the combination of Canadian Alliance and Progressive Conservative Party totals.

2000 Canadian federal election: Fredericton
Party	Candidate	Votes	%	±%
Liberal	Andy Scott	14,175	38.60	+4.48
Progressive Conservative	Raj Venugopal	10,919	29.73	-0.44
Alliance	Allan Neill	8,814	24.00	+2.24
New Democratic	Michael Dunn	2,584	7.04	-6.02
Natural Law	William Parker	233	0.63	-0.26
Total valid votes		36,725	100.00	
Rejected ballots		213	0.58	
Turnout		36,938	62.8	

Change for the Canadian Alliance is based on the 1997 results of its predecessors, the Reform Party.

1997 Canadian federal election: Fredericton
Party	Candidate	Votes	%	±%
Liberal	Andy Scott	12,252	34.12	-12.54
Progressive Conservative	Cleveland Allaby	10,835	30.17	+0.95
Reform	Mark McCready	7,815	21.76	+4.74
New Democratic	Patricia Hughes	4,689	13.06	+8.06
Natural Law	Jeanne Geldart	321	0.89	+0.07
Total valid votes		35,912	100.00	

Change from 1993 is not based on redistributed results.

1993 Canadian federal election: Fredericton
Party	Candidate	Votes	%	±%
Liberal	Andy Scott	21,868	46.66	+6.94
Progressive Conservative	Bud Bird	13,696	29.22	-13.76
Reform	Jack Lamey	7,977	17.02	Ø
New Democratic	Pauline MacKenzie	2,343	5.00	-5.32
Natural Law	Neil Dickie	382	0.82	Ø
Canada Party	Steven Gillrie	373	0.80	Ø
Independent	Doreen Fraser	226	0.48	-5.30
Total valid votes		46 865	100.00	

Doreen Fraser was nominated as a Confederation of Regions candidate, but was listed as an Independent because that party did not run enough candidates to be officially recognized.

27th Canadian Ministry (2003–2006) – Cabinet of Paul Martin
Cabinet posts (2)
Predecessor	Office	Successor
Andy Mitchell	Minister of Indian Affairs and Northern Development; 2004–2006	Jim Prentice
	Minister of State (Infrastructure); 2003–2004	
Special Cabinet Responsibilities
Predecessor	Title	Successor
Denis Coderre	Federal Interlocutor for Métis and Non-Status Indians; 2004–2006	Jim Prentice
26th Canadian Ministry (1993–2003) – Cabinet of Jean Chrétien
Cabinet post (1)
Predecessor	Office	Successor
Herb Gray	Solicitor General of Canada; 1997–1998	Lawrence MacAulay
