= Brian Macdonald (politician) =

Canadian politician

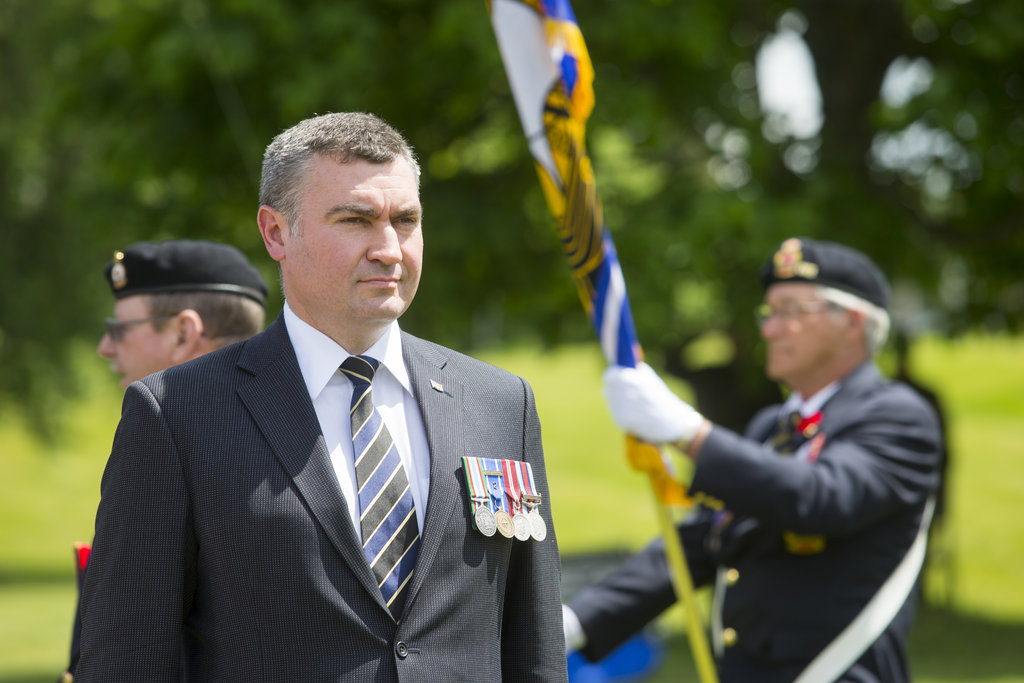
- Brian Macdonald at LAV unveiling

Member of the Legislative Assembly of New Brunswick
- In office October 12, 2010 – September 24, 2018
- Preceded by: Rick Miles
- Succeeded by: Dominic Cardy
- Constituency: Fredericton West-Hanwell (2014–2018); Fredericton-Silverwood (2010–2014)

Personal details
- Born: Brian Thomas Macdonald
- Party: Progressive Conservative
- Other political affiliations: Conservative (federal)
- Education: University of King's College; Royal Military College; London School of Economics

Military service
- Allegiance: Canada
- Branch: Canadian Army
- Unit: Royal Canadian Regiment
- Conflicts / operations: Bosnian war; NATO intervention; Iraq War

Brian Thomas Macdonald is a Canadian politician, who was elected to the Legislative Assembly of New Brunswick in the 2010 provincial election. He represented the electoral district of Fredericton West-Hanwell (and previously for Fredericton-Silverwood) until 2018 as a member of the Progressive Conservatives.

Macdonald served as Government Whip and Legislative Secretary to the Premier with responsible for Intergovernmental Affairs and Military Affairs from 2010 to 2014.

In the 2014 provincial election he was elected in the new riding of Fredericton West-Hanwell defeating New Brunswick NDP leader Dominic Cardy.

On January 21, 2016, Macdonald announced his candidacy for the leadership of the Progressive Conservative Party of New Brunswick.

On June 22, 2016 Macdonald helped to unveil the LAV Memorial for Canadian soldiers killed in Afghanistan in Oromocto.

On March 3, 2024, Macdonald was chosen to be the Conservative Party of Canada candidate for the riding of Fredericton—Oromocto in the upcoming 45th Canadian Federal Election, which was scheduled for April 28, 2025.

== Personal ==
Before entering provincial politics, Macdonald served in the Canadian Armed Forces in Bosnia and worked in Iraq. He had served as a policy advisor to the previous Minister of National Defence Peter Mackay.

== Education ==
Macdonald studied politics and history at the Royal Military College of Canada. Macdonald did his graduate studies in England at the London School of Economics where he earned his master's degree in politics as a Mackenzie King Travelling Scholar.

== Electoral record ==
2025 Canadian federal election: Fredericton—Oromocto
Party	Candidate	Votes	%	±%
Liberal	David Myles	30,750	61.29	+23.51
Conservative	Brian Macdonald	16,200	32.29	-2.22
Green	Pam Allen-Leblanc	1,568	3.13	-9.76
New Democratic	Nicki Lyons-MacFarlane	908	1.81	-11.19
Canadian Future	Dominic Cardy	345	0.69	N/A
People's	Heather Michaud	208	0.41	+0.07
Communist	June Patterson	146	0.29	-0.05
Centrist	Brandon Ellis	44	0.09	N/A
Total valid votes		50,169	99.52	
Total rejected ballots		243	0.48	-0.17
Turnout		50,412	75.75	+9.84
Eligible voters (Note: Number of eligible voters does not include election day registrations.)		66,550		
Liberal notional hold		Swing		+12.86
Source: Elections Canada

2014 New Brunswick general election: Fredericton West-Hanwell
Party	Candidate	Votes	%
Progressive Conservative	Brian Macdonald	2,971	35.21
New Democratic	Dominic Cardy	2,502	29.65
Liberal	Bernadine Gibson	2,384	28.25
Green	Gayla MacIntosh	582	6.90
Total valid votes		8,439	99.73
Total rejected ballots		23	0.27
Turnout		8,462	68.67
Eligible voters		12,323	
Source: Elections New Brunswick

2010 New Brunswick general election: Fredericton-Silverwood
Party	Candidate	Votes	%	±%
Progressive Conservative	Brian Macdonald	2,955	38.50	-2.47
Liberal	Rick Miles	2,507	32.66	-14.78
New Democratic	Tony Myatt	1,234	16.08	+4.49
Green	Jim Wolstenholme	912	11.88	–
Independent	Jim Andrews	67	0.87	–
Total valid votes		7,675	100.0	
Total rejected ballots		37	0.48	
Turnout		7,712	67.39	
Eligible voters		11,443		
Progressive Conservative gain from Liberal		Swing		+6.16
