= Bud Bird =

Canadian businessman

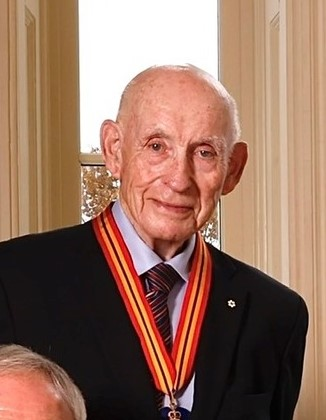
- Bird, as a recipient of the 2023 Order of New Brunswick award

Member of Parliament for Fredericton
- In office 1988–1993
- Preceded by: Robert Howie
- Succeeded by: Andy Scott

Member of the New Brunswick Legislative Assembly for Fredericton-Silverwood
- In office 1978–1982
- Preceded by: George Everett Chalmers
- Succeeded by: Dave Clark

Mayor of Fredericton
- In office 1969–1974
- Preceded by: William T. Walker
- Succeeded by: Elbridge Wilkins

Personal details
- Born: John Williston Bird; March 22, 1932 (age 94) Fredericton, New Brunswick, Canada
- Party: Progressive Conservative Party of New Brunswick
- Profession: businessman

John Williston "Bud" Bird, PC OC ONB (born March 22, 1932) is a Canadian businessman. He is a former mayor of Fredericton, a Progressive Conservative Party of New Brunswick member of the Legislative Assembly of New Brunswick, and a Progressive Conservative Party of Canada member of the House of Commons of Canada.

== Business career ==
In 1958, he founded J. W. Bird and Company Limited, suppliers to the construction industry. In 1975, he acquired William Stairs Son & Morrow Ltd. of Halifax, Nova Scotia, becoming Bird Stairs Limited. The business was sold to employees and today he operates Bird Holdings Ltd.

== Political offices ==
Bird served as Mayor of Fredericton from 1969 to 1974. He was elected to the Legislative Assembly of New Brunswick in 1978 and served as in the government of Richard Hatfield as Minister of Natural Resources from November 21, 1978, until he resigned from the legislature on June 10, 1982.

Bird ran in the November 21, 1988 Federal election, winning a seat in the 34th Canadian Parliament for the Fredericton riding. He was defeated in the 1993 election.

A sport fisherman and conservationist, Bird is Chairman Emeritus of the Miramichi Salmon Association and has been a Director of both the Atlantic Salmon Federation of Canada and Atlantic Salmon Federation of the United States.

In 2001, Bird was made an Officer of the Order of Canada.

== Electoral history ==
1993 Canadian federal election: Fredericton
Party	Candidate	Votes	%	±%
Liberal	Andy Scott	21,868	46.66	+6.94
Progressive Conservative	Bud Bird	13,696	29.22	-13.76
Reform	Jack Lamey	7,977	17.02	Ø
New Democratic	Pauline MacKenzie	2,343	5.00	-5.32
Natural Law	Neil Dickie	382	0.82	Ø
Canada Party	Steven Gillrie	373	0.80	Ø
Independent	Doreen Fraser	226	0.48	-5.30
Total valid votes		46 865	100.00	

Doreen Fraser was nominated as a Confederation of Regions candidate, but was listed as an Independent because that party did not run enough candidates to be officially recognized.

1988 Canadian federal election: Fredericton
Party	Candidate	Votes	%	±%
Progressive Conservative	Bud Bird	20,494	42.98	-15.87
Liberal	Brad Woodside	18,939	39.72	+16.66
New Democratic	Allan Sharp	4,922	10.32	-6.89
Confederation of Regions	Greg Hargrove	2,755	5.78	Ø
Rhinoceros	Chris Fullerton	316	0.66	Ø
Independent	Harry Marshall	253	0.53	-0.35
Total valid votes		47,679	100.00	

New Brunswick provincial government of Richard Hatfield
Cabinet post (1)
Predecessor	Office	Successor
Roland Boudreau	Minister of Natural Resources; 1978–1983	Edwin G. Allen
