= Hedley Francis Gregory Bridges =

Canadian politician (1902–1947)

The Honourable Hedley Francis Gregory Bridges PC

Member of Parliament for York—Sunbury
- In office June 11, 1945 – August 10, 1947
- Preceded by: Richard Hanson
- Succeeded by: Milton Fowler Gregg

Member of the Legislative Assembly of New Brunswick for Restigouche
- In office June 27, 1935 – November 19, 1939

Personal details
- Born: April 7, 1902 Fredericton, New Brunswick, Canada
- Died: August 10, 1947 (aged 45) Ottawa, Ontario, Canada
- Party: Liberal
- Cabinet: Minister of Fisheries (1945–1947)

Hedley Francis Gregory Bridges (April 7, 1902 – August 10, 1947) was a Canadian politician.

Born in Fredericton, New Brunswick, the son of Hedley Vicars Burpee Bridges and Mabel Eloise Fulton Gregory, he was educated at the University of New Brunswick. He studied law and was called to the Bar of New Brunswick in 1927. Bridges served as solicitor for the Royal Bank of Canada at Campbellton. He also taught school and was a high school principal.

Bridges was a member of the Legislative Assembly of New Brunswick for the electoral district of Restigouche from 1935 to 1939. From 1936 to 1938, he was the Speaker of the Legislative Assembly. During World War II, he served in the Canadian Army with the II Canadian Corps. After the war, he was elected to the House of Commons of Canada representing the riding of York—Sunbury in the 1945 federal election. A Liberal, from 1945 until his death in 1947, he was the Minister of Fisheries.

== Electoral history ==
1945 Canadian federal election: Fredericton
Party	Candidate	Votes	%	±%
Liberal	Hedley Francis Gregory Bridges	10,828	48.22	-0.68
Progressive Conservative	Ernest William Sansom	9,953	44.32	-6.78
Co-operative Commonwealth	Murray Young	1,674	7.45	Ø
Total valid votes		22,455	100.00	

Political offices
Preceded by Frederick C. Squires	Speaker of the Legislative Assembly of New Brunswick; 1936–1938	Succeeded by Charles H. Blakeney
