= Richard Hanson (Canadian politician) =

Canadian politician

The Honourable Richard Hanson PC KC
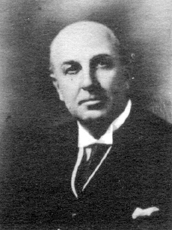

Leader of the Opposition
- In office May 14, 1940 – January 28, 1943
- Preceded by: Robert Manion
- Succeeded by: Gordon Graydon

Interim Leader of the Conservative Party
- In office May 5, 1940 – November 11, 1941
- Preceded by: Robert Manion
- Succeeded by: Arthur Meighen

Minister of Trade and Commerce
- In office November 17, 1934 – October 22, 1935
- Prime Minister: R. B. Bennett
- Preceded by: Henry Herbert Stevens
- Succeeded by: William Daum Euler

Member of Parliament for York—Sunbury
- In office March 25, 1940 – June 10, 1945
- Preceded by: William George Clark
- Succeeded by: Hedley Francis Gregory Bridges
- In office May 28, 1921 – October 13, 1935
- Preceded by: Harry Fulton McLeod
- Succeeded by: William George Clark

Mayor of Fredericton
- In office 1918–1920

Personal details
- Born: Richard Burpee Hanson; March 20, 1879 Bocabec, New Brunswick, Canada
- Died: July 10, 1948 (aged 69)
- Party: Conservative
- Spouse: Jean Balfour Neill (m. 1906)
- Children: 1
- Education: Mount Allison University; Dalhousie Law School
- Profession: Lawyer

Richard Burpee Hanson, PC KC (March 20, 1879 – July 14, 1948) was a Canadian politician who served as interim leader of the Conservative Party from May 14, 1940, until November 11, 1941.

== Early life and education ==
Hanson was born on March 20, 1879, in Bocabec, Charlotte County, New Brunswick, to parents Richard B. and Hannah Hanson. He was educated in public schools in St. Andrews, New Brunswick, Mount Allison University, and Dalhousie Law School.

== Career ==
Hanson was admitted to the Bar of New Brunswick in November 1902 and was created a King's Counsel by the Government of New Brunswick in January 1917. From 1918 to 1920, he was Mayor of Fredericton.

First elected as a Conservative Member of Parliament (MP) for the New Brunswick electoral district of York—Sunbury in the 1921 general election, Hanson served continuously in the House of Commons of Canada until his defeat in the 1935 election. He was appointed to the Cabinet of R. B. Bennett in 1934 as Minister of Trade and Commerce.

In the 1940 election, he returned to Parliament despite the poor showing of the Conservatives in that election and the personal defeat of Robert Manion. Since Manion resigned two months after the election, the Conservative caucus chose Hanson as interim leader and he served as Conservative Party Leader until Arthur Meighen was appointed the party's new leader in November 1941. As Meighen did not have a seat in the House (and then failed to win a seat through a by-election), Hanson continued as Leader of the Opposition until 1943.

== Death and legacy ==
Hanson died on July 14, 1948, due to illness. The University of New Brunswick hands out the Richard Burpee Hanson Prize to a Faculty of Arts male student with the highest grades in English and History in the Sophomore level.

== Archives ==
There is a Richard Burpee Hanson fonds at Library and Archives Canada.

== Electoral history ==
1940 Canadian federal election: Fredericton
Party	Candidate	Votes	%	±%
National Government	Richard Hanson	10,352	51.10	+5.53
Liberal	Peter J. Hughes	9,908	48.90	+2.05
Total valid votes		20,260	100.00	

1935 Canadian federal election: Fredericton
Party	Candidate	Votes	%	±%
Liberal	William George Clark	9,296	46.85	+15.92
Conservative	Richard Hanson	9,042	45.57	-23.50
Reconstruction	Errol MacDonald	1,506	7.59	Ø
Total valid votes		19,844	100.00	

1930 Canadian federal election: Fredericton
Party	Candidate	Votes	%	±%
Conservative	Richard Hanson	10,166	69.07	+3.61
Liberal	Fraser Winslow	4,552	30.93	-3.61
Total valid votes		14,718	100.00	
Source: lop.parl.ca

1926 Canadian federal election: Fredericton
Party	Candidate	Votes	%	±%
Conservative	Richard Hanson	8,451	65.46	-7.46
Liberal	Peter J. Hughes	4,459	34.54	+7.46
Total valid votes		12,910	100.00	

1925 Canadian federal election: Fredericton
Party	Candidate	Votes	%	±%
Conservative	Richard Hanson	8,636	72.92	+19.97
Liberal	Charles Robert Hawkins	3,207	27.08	-19.97
Total valid votes		11,843	100.00	

1921 Canadian federal election: Fredericton
Party	Candidate	Votes	%	±%
Conservative	Richard Hanson	7,777	52.95	-0.62
Liberal	William James Osborne	6,911	47.05	+0.62
Total valid votes		14,688	100.00	

Party political offices
Preceded by Robert Manion	Leader of the Conservative Party; 1940–1941; Interim	Succeeded by Arthur Meighen
