= Ryan Riordon =

Canadian politician

MLA for Nepisiguit
- In office October 12, 2010 – 2014
- Preceded by: Cheryl Lavoie
- Succeeded by: riding dissolved

Personal details
- Born: 1982 (age 43–44)
- Party: Progressive Conservative

Ryan Riordon (born 1982) is a Canadian politician, who was elected to the Legislative Assembly of New Brunswick in the 2010 provincial election. He represented the electoral district of Nepisiguit as a member of the Progressive Conservatives until 2014, when he was defeated by Denis Landry in the redistributed riding of Bathurst East-Nepisiguit-Saint-Isidore.
