= Nepisiguit (electoral district) =

Defunct provincial electoral district in New Brunswick, Canada

Nepisiquit
New Brunswick electoral district

Defunct provincial electoral district
- Legislature: Legislative Assembly of New Brunswick
- District created: 1973
- First contested: 1974
- Last contested: 2010

Demographics
- Population (2006): 11,970
- Electors (2010): 8,415

Nepisiguit was a provincial electoral district for the Legislative Assembly of New Brunswick, Canada. It was known as Nepisiguit-Chaleur from 1974 to 1995.

== Members of the Legislative Assembly ==
Assembly	Years	Member	Party
Nepisiguit-Chaleur; Riding created from Gloucester
48th	1974–1978	Frank Branch	Liberal
49th	1978–1982	Frank Branch	Liberal
50th	1982–1987	Frank Branch	Liberal
51st	1987–1991	Frank Branch	Liberal
52nd	1991–1995	Frank Branch	Liberal
Nepisiguit
53rd	1995–1999	Alban Landry	Liberal
54th	1999–2003	Joel Bernard	Progressive Conservative
55th	2003–2006	Frank Branch	Liberal
55th	2006–2006	Frank Branch	Independent
56th	2006–2010	Cheryl Lavoie	Liberal
57th	2010–2014	Ryan Riordon	Progressive Conservative
Riding dissolved into Bathurst East-Nepisiguit-Saint-Isidore, Restigouche-Chaleur and Bathurst West-Beresford

== Election results ==
=== Nepisiguit ===
2010 New Brunswick general election
Party	Candidate	Votes	%	±%
Progressive Conservative	Ryan Riordon	2,454	41.03	-1.33
Liberal	Cheryl Lavoie	1,944	32.50	-16.70
New Democratic	Pierre Cyr	1,474	24.64	+16.20
Green	Patrice Des Lauriers	109	1.82	–
Total valid votes		5,981	100.0	
Total rejected ballots		58	0.96	
Turnout		6,039	71.76	
Eligible voters		8,415		
Progressive Conservative gain from Liberal		Swing		+7.68

2006 New Brunswick general election
Party	Candidate	Votes	%	±%
Liberal	Cheryl Lavoie	2,844	49.20	-3.86
Progressive Conservative	Gerry Legere	2,449	42.36	+8.99
New Democratic	Charles Fournier	488	8.44	-5.12
Total valid votes		5,781	100.0	
Total rejected ballots		62	1.06	
Turnout		5,843	64.39	
Eligible voters		9,074		
Liberal notional gain from Independent		Swing		-6.42

2003 New Brunswick general election
Party	Candidate	Votes	%	±%
Liberal	Frank Branch	3,498	53.06	+19.25
Progressive Conservative	Joel Bernard	2,200	33.37	-5.11
New Democratic	Normand Savoie	894	13.56	-14.14
Total valid votes		6,592	99.01	
Total rejected ballots		66	0.99	+0.33
Turnout		6,658	67.50	-3.09
Eligible voters		9,864		
Liberal gain from Progressive Conservative		Swing		+12.18

1999 New Brunswick general election
Party	Candidate	Votes	%	±%
Progressive Conservative	Joel Bernard	2,534	38.48	+8.18
Liberal	Alban Landry	2,227	33.82	-23.82
New Democratic	Gilles Halley	1,824	27.70	+16.99
Total valid votes		6,585	99.34	
Total rejected ballots		44	0.66	-0.50
Turnout		6,629	70.59	+1.33
Eligible voters		9,391		
Progressive Conservative gain from Liberal		Swing		+16.00

1995 New Brunswick general election
Party	Candidate	Votes	%	±%
Liberal	Alban Landry	3,715	57.64	-1.91
Progressive Conservative	Anne-Marie Gammon	1,953	30.30	+20.52
New Democratic	Normand Savoie	690	10.71	-7.90
Natural Law	Andie Haché	87	1.35	–
Total valid votes		6,445	98.83	
Total rejected ballots		76	1.17	-0.32
Turnout		6,521	69.25	-10.65
Eligible voters		9,416		
Liberal hold		Swing		-11.22

=== Nepisiguit-Chaleur ===
1991 New Brunswick general election
Party	Candidate	Votes	%	±%
Liberal	Frank Branch	3,752	59.56	-19.44
New Democratic	Karen Ann McCrea	1,172	18.60	+13.59
Confederation of Regions	Laurie Alan Daley	760	12.06	–
Progressive Conservative	Robert Hornibrook	616	9.78	-6.21
Total valid votes		6,300	98.51	
Total rejected ballots		95	1.49	+0.98
Turnout		6,395	79.91	-6.04
Eligible voters		8,003		
Liberal hold		Swing		-16.52

1987 New Brunswick general election
Party	Candidate	Votes	%	±%
Liberal	Frank Branch	5,086	79.00	+19.01
Progressive Conservative	Claude Albert	1,029	15.98	-9.69
New Democratic	Harry Scott	323	5.02	-5.82
Total valid votes		6,438	99.49	
Total rejected ballots		33	0.51	-0.00
Turnout		6,471	85.95	-1.70
Eligible voters		6,471		
Liberal hold		Swing		+14.35

1982 New Brunswick general election
Party	Candidate	Votes	%	±%
Liberal	Frank Branch	3,510	59.99	-1.70
Progressive Conservative	Patrice Battah	1,502	25.67	+4.13
New Democratic	Sherwood Scott	634	10.84	–
Parti acadien	Léon Losier	205	3.50	-13.27
Total valid votes		5,851	99.49	
Total rejected ballots		30	0.51	-0.73
Turnout		5,881	87.65	+4.37
Eligible voters		6,710		
Liberal hold		Swing		-2.91

1978 New Brunswick general election
Party	Candidate	Votes	%	±%
Liberal	Frank Branch	3,156	61.69	+5.09
Progressive Conservative	Hilaire Brideau	1,102	21.54	-18.52
Parti acadien	Paul-Émile Mourant	858	16.77	+13.43
Total valid votes		5,116	98.76	
Total rejected ballots		64	1.24	+0.18
Turnout		5,180	83.28	+0.93
Eligible voters		6,220		
Liberal hold		Swing		+11.81

1974 New Brunswick general election
Party	Candidate	Votes	%
Liberal	Frank Branch	2,488	56.60
Progressive Conservative	Edmond Landry	1,761	40.06
Parti acadien	André Dumont	147	3.34
Total valid votes		4,396	98.94
Total rejected ballots		47	1.06
Turnout		4,443	83.25
Eligible voters		5,395	
This riding came from the multi-member riding of Gloucester, which elected 5 Liberals (out of 5 seats) in 1970; one Progressive Conservative member was elected in a 1972 by-election. Frank Branch was one of five incumbents.

== See also ==
- List of New Brunswick provincial electoral districts
- Canadian provincial electoral districts
