= Joel Bernard =

Canadian conservative politician

Joel Bernard MLA

Member of the Legislative Assembly of New Brunswick
- In office 1999–2003
- Preceded by: Alban Landry
- Succeeded by: Frank Branch
- Constituency: Nepisiguit

Personal details
- Born: December 8, 1963 (age 62) Dalhousie, New Brunswick, Canada
- Party: Conservative Party of Canada
- Other political affiliations: Progressive Conservative
- Profession: Politician

Joel Bernard (born December 8, 1963) is a Canadian conservative politician.

== Political career ==
=== Provincial ===
He was elected to the Legislative Assembly of New Brunswick, representing Nepisiguit, in the general election of 1999 and became deputy speaker of the Legislature. He was defeated in his bid for a second term in the 2003 election by former Member of the Legislative Assembly (MLA) Frank Branch. Branch had represented the area from 1970 to 1995, when he retired and did not seek re-election.

Bernard was one of several defeated Progressive Conservative MLAs who were appointed to government positions by Premier Bernard Lord following their defeat in the 2003 election.

Bernard had been appointed to oversee and economic development fund for the Restigouche-Baie des Chaleurs region. He took a leave of absence from his position in March 2004 to be a Conservative candidate in the 2004 federal election.

=== Federal ===
In late April 2005, Bernard announced he would be a candidate for the Conservative nomination for the riding of Ottawa—Orléans for the next federal election. On May 16, he was defeated by Royal Galipeau, a former member of the Liberal Party of Canada, for the nomination by a margin of 174 to 126, who went on to win the seat in the election.

From 2006 to 2008, Bernard held the position of Senior Policy Advisor in the office of Stockwell Day, Minister of Public Safety in the new Conservative government.

In the 2008 federal election, the Conservative Party brought Bernard to Nova Scotia to run against Conservative-turned-Independent Bill Casey in the riding of Cumberland–Colchester–Musquodoboit Valley. On election night, Casey was re-elected by over 22,000 votes, with Bernard finishing third, polling just under 9%.

Bernard was the Senior Policy Advisor for aerospace, procurements, industrial regional benefits and the auto file to Tony Clement, Minister of Industry Canada, until he left the position in 2010. Since then, he has held several positions of Senior Policy Advisor for Fisheries & Oceans Canada, International Development and La francophonie. He later was employed as a Parliamentary Affairs Advisor for Pierre Paul-Hus, the Shadow minister for Public Safety, Border Security and Emergency Preparedness and the Member of Parliament for Charlesbourg – Haute – Saint-Charles.

In March 2019, Bernard won the Ottawa—Vanier Conservative nomination contest, becoming their candidate for the 2019 federal election.

== Personal life ==
He lives in Ottawa, Ontario with his wife Catherine and his two children, Lilianne and Samuel. Joel retired in December 2023 and is the co-founder of the Hill Advisory Network (THAN). THAN is a mentoring service made available free of charge to Parliament Hill Staffers (All political stripes).

== Electoral record ==
=== Federal ===
2021 Canadian federal election: Gatineau
Party	Candidate	Votes	%	±%	Expenditures
Liberal	Steven MacKinnon	26,267	50.0	-2.1	$55,420.93
Bloc Québécois	Geneviève Nadeau	12,278	23.4	+2.0	$13,121.18
Conservative	Joel Bernard	5,752	11.0	+0.7	$3,144.49
New Democratic	Fernanda Rengel	4,508	8.6	-2.4	$51.11
People's	Mathieu Saint-Jean	2,264	4.3	+3.3	$4,401.73
Green	Rachid Jemmah	783	1.5	-2.6	$0.00
Free	Luc Lavoie	411	0.8	N/A	$564.48
Rhinoceros	Sébastien Grenier	178	0.3	N/A	$0.00
Marxist–Leninist	Pierre Soublière	56	0.1	±0.0	$0.00
Total valid votes/expense limit		52,497	98.5	–	$113,382.26
Total rejected ballots		818	1.5		
Turnout		53,315	63.8		
Registered voters		83,618			
Liberal hold		Swing		-2.0	
Source: Elections Canada

2019 Canadian federal election: Ottawa—Vanier
Party	Candidate	Votes	%	±%	Expenditures
Liberal	Mona Fortier	32,679	51.2	0	$76,159.78
New Democratic	Stéphanie Mercier	13,516	21.2	-7.5	none listed
Conservative	Joel Bernard	11,118	17.4	+2	$18,239.00
Green	Oriana Ngabirano	4,796	7.5	+4.2	$8,669.23
People's	Paul Durst	1,064	1.7		$6,338.44
Rhinoceros	Derek Miller	229	0.4		$0.00
Independent	Joel Altman	211	0.3		$281.93
Communist	Michelle Paquette	115	0.2		$496.90
Independent	Daniel James McHugh	94	0.1		$0.00
Marxist–Leninist	Christian Legeais	59	0.1		$0.00
Total valid votes/expense limit		63,881	100.0		
Total rejected ballots		699			
Turnout		64,580	71.0		
Eligible voters		91,015			
Liberal hold		Swing		+3.75	
Source: Elections Canada

2008 Canadian federal election
Party	Candidate	Votes	%	±%	Expenditures
Independent	Bill Casey	27,303	69.01	+16.97	$68,549.58
New Democratic	Karen Olsson	4,874	12.32	-8.42	$6,944.11
Conservative	Joel Bernard	3,493	8.83	-43.21	$35,846.73
Liberal	Tracy Parsons	3,344	8.45	-15.44	$28,266.26
Independent	Rick Simpson	550	1.39	+0.17	none listed
Total valid votes/Expense limit		39,564	100.0		$84,518
Total rejected, unmarked and declined ballots		201	0.51	+0.04	
Turnout		39,765	57.77	-4.08	
Eligible voters		68,831			
Independent gain from Conservative		Swing		+12.68	

2004 Canadian federal election: Acadie—Bathurst
Party	Candidate	Votes	%	±%	Expenditures
New Democratic	Yvon Godin	23,857	53.93	+7.26	$61,745.98
Liberal	Serge Rousselle	14,452	32.67	-7.75	$60,252.15
Conservative	Joel Bernard	4,841	10.94	-1.97	$51,943.73
Green	Mario Lanteigne	1,085	2.45	–	$7,040.66
Total valid votes/expense limit		44,235	100.0		$71,582
Total rejected, unmarked and declined ballots		527	1.18	-0.04	
Turnout		44,762	70.38	-4.99	
Eligible voters		63,603			
New Democratic notional hold		Swing		+7.50	
Changes from 2000 are based on redistributed results. Conservative Party change is based on the combination of Canadian Alliance and Progressive Conservative Party totals.

=== Provincial ===
2003 New Brunswick general election
Party	Candidate	Votes	%	±%
Liberal	Frank Branch	3,498	53.06	+19.24
Progressive Conservative	Joel Bernard	2,200	33.37	-5.11
New Democratic	Normand Savoie	894	13.56	-14.14
Total valid votes		6,592	100.0	
Liberal gain from Progressive Conservative		Swing		+12.18

1999 New Brunswick general election
Party	Candidate	Votes	%	±%
Progressive Conservative	Joel Bernard	2,534	38.48	+8.18
Liberal	Alban Landry	2,227	33.82	-23.82
New Democratic	Gilles Halley	1,824	27.70	+16.99
Total valid votes		6,585	100.0	
Progressive Conservative gain from Liberal		Swing		+16.00
