= John Chester MacRae =

Canadian politician

J. Chester MacRae MC
- Official 1968 portrait

Member of Parliament for York-Sunbury
- In office June 10, 1957 – October 29, 1972
- Preceded by: Milton Fowler Gregg
- Succeeded by: Robert Howie

Personal details
- Born: August 29, 1912 Hope Town, Quebec, Canada
- Died: October 5, 1997 (aged 85) Fredericton, New Brunswick, Canada
- Party: Progressive Conservative

John Chester "Chet" MacRae MC (August 29, 1912 – October 5, 1997) was a Canadian school teacher, soldier, and politician. Known by his second name, Chester, he was widely referred to as "Chet."

Born in Hope Town, Quebec, MacRae lived most of his life in the Province of New Brunswick. He graduated from high school in Campbellton, New Brunswick then attended the provincial Normal School in Fredericton. He taught in the public school system until 1940.

A veteran of World War II, serving in the Canadian Army he rose to the rank of captain in New Brunswick's North Shore Regiment and participated in the D-Day Normandy Landings in France. He was awarded a number of medals including the Military Cross. In later years he was appointed an honorary Colonel of the First Battalion Royal New Brunswick Regiment, the Carleton-York regiment.

MacRae was first elected to the House of Commons of Canada in 1957 as the Progressive Conservative Party's candidate in the York-Sunbury riding. He was re-elected in 1958, 1962, 1963, 1965, and 1968. He served until September 1, 1972.

He died at a Fredericton hospital in 1997.

== Archives ==
There is a John Chester MacRae fonds at Library and Archives Canada. Archival reference number is R3367.

== Electoral history ==
1968 Canadian federal election: Fredericton
Party	Candidate	Votes	%	±%
Progressive Conservative	John Chester MacRae	17,394	55.39	+6.87
Liberal	Paul Burden	12,983	41.34	-4.40
New Democratic	Patrick Callaghan	1,028	3.27	-2.47
Total valid votes		31,405	100.00	

1965 Canadian federal election: Fredericton
Party	Candidate	Votes	%	±%
Progressive Conservative	John Chester MacRae	15,813	48.52	+0.04
Liberal	Paul Burden	14,909	45.74	+0.78
New Democratic	Patrick Callaghan	1,872	5.74	+2.67
Total valid votes		32,594	100.00	

1963 Canadian federal election: Fredericton
Party	Candidate	Votes	%	±%
Progressive Conservative	John Chester MacRae	15,827	48.48	-0.11
Liberal	David Dickson	14,678	44.96	+2.09
Social Credit	George Nickerson	1,142	3.50	-1.32
New Democratic	Lovell Clark	1,001	3.07	-0.65
Total valid votes		32,648	100.00	

1962 Canadian federal election: Fredericton
Party	Candidate	Votes	%	±%
Progressive Conservative	John Chester MacRae	15,255	48.59	-4.83
Liberal	David Dickson	13,461	42.87	-1.45
Social Credit	George Nickerson	1,513	4.82	Ø
New Democratic	John Simonds	1,167	3.72	+1.46
Total valid votes		31,396	100.00	

Changes for the New Democratic Party are based on the 1958 results of its predecessor, the Cooperative Commonwealth Federation.

1958 Canadian federal election: Fredericton
Party	Candidate	Votes	%	±%
Progressive Conservative	John Chester MacRae	15,813	53.42	+3.96
Liberal	David Dickson	13,118	44.32	-3.89
Co-operative Commonwealth	Lawrence Bright	669	2.26	-0.07
Total valid votes		29,600	100.00	

1957 Canadian federal election: Fredericton
Party	Candidate	Votes	%	±%
Progressive Conservative	John Chester MacRae	13,356	49.46	+6.71
Liberal	Milton Fowler Gregg	13,018	48.21	-4.49
Co-operative Commonwealth	Lawrence Bright	628	2.33	-2.21
Total valid votes		27,002	100.00	
