= Fredericton West-Hanwell =

Provincial electoral district in New Brunswick, Canada

New Brunswick electoral district
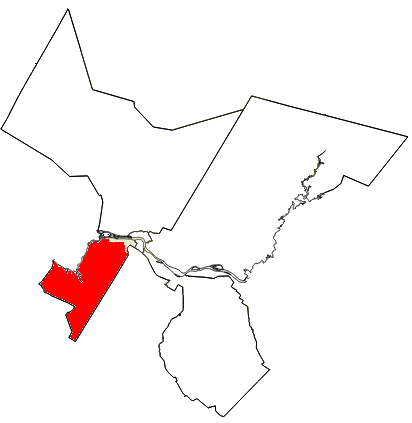
- The riding of Fredericton West-Hanwell in relation to other Fredericton electoral districts. The parts of the riding within Fredericton are gold, the balance of the riding is red.
- Coordinates: 45.853°N 66.854°W

Defunct provincial electoral district
- Legislature: Legislative Assembly of New Brunswick
- District created: 2013
- First contested: 2014
- Last contested: 2020

Demographics
- Population (2011): 16,147
- Electors (2013): 11,127
- Census division: York
- Census subdivision(s): Fredericton, Hanwell, Kingsclear

Fredericton West-Hanwell (French: Fredericton-Ouest-Hanwell) was a provincial electoral district for the Legislative Assembly of New Brunswick, Canada. It was first contested in the 2014 general election, having been created in the 2013 redistribution of electoral boundaries by combining portions of the Fredericton-Silverwood and York electoral districts.

The district included the southwestern part of the city of Fredericton as well as two adjacent communities: Hanwell and Kingsclear, and the Kingsclear First Nation.

Beginning with the 2024 New Brunswick general election, the constituency was redistributed into the new Fredericton South-Silverwood and Hanwell-New Maryland constituencies.

== Members of the Legislative Assembly ==
Assembly	Years	Member	Party
Riding created from York (1995–2014) and Fredericton-Silverwood
58th	2014–2018	Brian Macdonald	Progressive Conservative
59th	2018–2020	Dominic Cardy	Progressive Conservative
60th	2020–2022	Dominic Cardy	Progressive Conservative
60th	2022–2024	Dominic Cardy	Independent
Riding dissolved into Fredericton South-Silverwood, Hanwell-New Maryland, Carleton-York and Fredericton-Lincoln

== Election results ==
2020 New Brunswick general election
Party	Candidate	Votes	%	±%
Progressive Conservative	Dominic Cardy	4,726	52.88	+21.06
Green	Susan Jonah	1,745	19.53	+2.22
Liberal	Chris Duffie	1,510	16.90	-11.03
People's Alliance	Mel Keeling	825	9.23	-11.72
New Democratic	Armand Cormier	131	1.47	-0.52
Total valid votes		8,937	99.84	
Total rejected ballots		14	0.16	
Turnout		8,951	72.26	
Eligible voters		12,387		
Progressive Conservative hold		Swing		+9.42
Source: Elections New Brunswick

2018 New Brunswick general election
Party	Candidate	Votes	%	±%
Progressive Conservative	Dominic Cardy	2,739	31.82	-3.38*
Liberal	Cindy Miles	2,404	27.93	-0.32
People's Alliance	Jason Paull	1,803	20.95	--
Green	Susan Jonah	1,490	17.31	+10.41
New Democratic	Olivier Hébert	171	1.99	-27.66
Total valid votes		8,607	99.78	
Total rejected ballots		19	0.22	-0.05
Turnout		8,626	69.10	+0.43
Eligible voters		12,483		
Progressive Conservative hold		Swing		-1.53
*Progressive Conservative vote share change is in comparison to that of PC candidate in 2014. Dominic Cardy's personal vote share change in comparison to his share as NDP candidate in 2014 was +2.17%.
Source: Elections New Brunswick

2014 New Brunswick general election
Party	Candidate	Votes	%
Progressive Conservative	Brian Macdonald	2,971	35.21
New Democratic	Dominic Cardy	2,502	29.65
Liberal	Bernadine Gibson	2,384	28.25
Green	Gayla MacIntosh	582	6.90
Total valid votes		8,439	99.73
Total rejected ballots		23	0.27
Turnout		8,462	68.67
Eligible voters		12,323	
This riding was created from parts of the former riding of York and Fredericton-Silverwood, both elected a Progressive Conservative in the previous election. Brian Macdonald was the incumbent from Fredericton-Silverwood.
Source: Elections New Brunswick

== See also ==
- List of New Brunswick provincial electoral districts
- Canadian provincial electoral districts
