= J. Albert Richardson =

Leader of the New Brunswick New Democratic Party
- In office 1970–1971
- Preceded by: Jack Currie
- Succeeded by: Pat Callaghan
- In office 1971–1976
- Preceded by: Pat Callaghan
- Succeeded by: John LaBossiere

Personal details
- Born: c. 1938 Chatham, New Brunswick
- Died: April 2, 2002 (aged 64) Bellefond, New Brunswick
- Party: New Brunswick New Democratic Party
- Occupation: Trade union official, politician

J. Albert Richardson (c. 1938 – April 2, 2002) was a trade unionist and politician who was leader of the New Brunswick New Democratic Party from 1970 until 1976 save for a one-month interruption in late 1971.

A woods contractor in the Miramichi, Richardson became active in the union movement and was a staff representative with the Canadian Food and Allied Workers union (CFAW) and later served as secretary-treasurer of the New Brunswick Federation of Labour from 1981 to 1986.

As NDP leader, Richardson was on the right wing of the party and opposed to the militancy of radicalized university students involved with the NDP. He criticized left winger NDPers who had protested the implementation of the War Measures Act during the 1970 October Crisis and was challenged by the New Brunswick chapter of The Waffle, a left wing faction in the NDP made up of Marxist students as well as older leftist activists. Under the leadership of veteran Fredericton socialist Pat Callaghan, the Waffle narrowly had its manifesto adopted by the New Brunswick NDP at a convention in the fall of 1971. The Waffle took over the party with Callaghan displacing Richardson as leader in October 1971. However, the federal party intervened and called a special convention the next month which routed the Waffle and restored Richardson as party leader.

Richardson was one of only three candidates who ran for the NDP in the 1967 provincial election, the first the party contested since its founding in 1962. He led the NDP through the 1970 and 1974 provincial elections, in which the party ran seats in most of the province's ridings for the first time, but failed to win any seats or take the party above 3% of the popular vote. He stepped down in 1976 and returned to the union movement. He died on April 2, 2002.
