= Frank Branch =

Canadian politician (1944–2018)

Member of the New Brunswick Legislative Assembly for Nepisiguit-Chaleur
- In office 1974–1995

Member of the New Brunswick Legislative Assembly for Gloucester County
- In office 1970–1974

Member of the New Brunswick Legislative Assembly for Nepisiguit
- In office 2003–2006

Personal details
- Born: May 7, 1944 Bathurst, New Brunswick
- Died: October 22, 2018 (aged 74) Bathurst, New Brunswick
- Party: Liberal

Frank Richard Branch (May 7, 1944 – October 22, 2018) was a Canadian politician.

== Life and career ==
Branch was born on May 7, 1944, in Bathurst, New Brunswick. A Liberal, he was first elected to the New Brunswick Legislature to the multi-member riding for Gloucester County in the 1970 provincial election He was re-elected to the legislature for the single member riding of Nepisiguit-Chaleur in 1974, 1978, 1982, 1987 and 1991. He served as speaker from 1987 to 1991 but was neither elected speaker nor named to the cabinet following the 1991 elections and thus did not run for re-election in 1995.

While retired from politics, he chaired a regional forestry marketing board for eight years before he sought re-election in the new, though largely unchanged, riding of Nepisiguit in 2003, where he defeated incumbent Progressive Conservative Joel Bernard by a margin of nearly 2-to-1.

In October 2005, the North Shore Forest Products marketing board, of which Branch is general manager, was taken under investigation for unspecified reasons. On January 13, 2006, Branch left the Liberal caucus to sit as an independent pending the outcome of the investigation and on March 23, 2006, the Canadian Broadcasting Corporation reported that he had been fired.

He served as chair of the legislature's Public Accounts Committee from the 2003 election until he left the Liberal caucus to sit as an independent. He did not seek re-election in 2006.

In 2012, Branch pled guilty to fraud of over $5,000 and was sentenced to one year of house arrest and two years of probation. He was additionally ordered to pay $15,000 in restitution to the North Shore Forest Products Marketing Board.

On October 22, 2018, Branch died from cancer in Bathurst, at the age of 74.
