= Russell King (politician) =

Canadian politician

Member of the Legislative Assembly
- In office 1987–1998
- Constituency: Fredericton South

Personal details
- Born: April 29, 1940 (age 86) St. Stephen, New Brunswick, Canada
- Party: Liberal Party of New Brunswick
- Occupation: Politician, physician

Russell Hugh Tennant "Russ" King (born April 29, 1940) is a physician and former political figure in New Brunswick, Canada.

King represented Fredericton South from 1987 to 1998 as a Liberal member.

He was born in St. Stephen, New Brunswick, the son of John C. King. He was educated at Mount Allison University and Dalhousie University Medical School. He served as Minister of Advanced Education and Training from 1987 to 1991 and Minister of Health and Community Services from 1991 to 1998. King resigned his seat and cabinet post in 1998 to return to his medical practice in Fredericton.
