= New Brunswick electoral redistribution =

Reallocation of electoral districts

Unlike most other provinces and the federal government, the province of New Brunswick until very recently had no statutory mechanism for electoral district redistribution. Thus, redistributions were not predictable and occurred only when consensus in the Legislative Assembly of New Brunswick demanded it. Throughout most of New Brunswick's early history redistribution was a result of the addition of new counties, upon which the districts were based, which expanded from seven in 1785 to fifteen in 1874.

Starting in 2005–2006, electoral distributions were undertaken under statutory requirements first immediately thereafter and initially after every decennial Canadian census starting in 2011, however the Act was later amendment to hold them after every two general elections.

The populations of New Brunswick's electoral districts are required to stay within 15 percent of the average number of voters in each district, with deviations up to 25 percent allowed when needed to ensure fair linguistic representation. In 2023, the province passed legislation allowing for an exception to this rule to avoid adding 800 mostly francophone voters to the mostly anglophone riding of Tantramar.

== List of electoral redistributions ==
- 1785 New Brunswick electoral distribution
- 1795 New Brunswick electoral redistribution
- 1824 New Brunswick electoral redistribution
- 1826 New Brunswick electoral redistribution
- 1827 New Brunswick electoral redistribution
- 1834 New Brunswick electoral redistribution
- 1838 New Brunswick electoral redistribution
- 1842 New Brunswick electoral redistribution
- 1845 New Brunswick electoral redistribution
- 1846 New Brunswick electoral redistribution
- 1874 New Brunswick electoral redistribution
- 1891 New Brunswick electoral redistribution
- 1895 New Brunswick electoral redistribution
- 1912 New Brunswick electoral redistribution
- 1924 New Brunswick electoral redistribution
- 1926 New Brunswick electoral redistribution
- 1946 New Brunswick electoral redistribution
- 1967 New Brunswick electoral redistribution
- 1973 New Brunswick electoral redistribution
- 1994 New Brunswick electoral redistribution
- 2006 New Brunswick electoral redistribution
- 2013 New Brunswick electoral redistribution
- 2021 New Brunswick electoral redistribution

== History of districts ==
=== 1784-1995 ===
From the founding of New Brunswick until 1995, no electoral district crossed a county line. All districts through this time period can be traced back to one of New Brunswick's original 8 counties. From the 1973 redistribution until the abolishment of these districts at the 1995 election, all districts had 1 member.

	Electoral Districts																		
Original County	1785	1795	1824	1826	1827	1834	1838	1842	1845	1846	1874	1891	1895	1912	1924	1926	1946	1967	1973
Charlotte	Charlotte (4 members)														Charlotte (3 members)	Charlotte (4 members)			Charlotte Centre
Charlotte	Charlotte (4 members)														Charlotte (3 members)	Charlotte (4 members)			Charlotte West
Charlotte	Charlotte (4 members)														Charlotte (3 members)	Charlotte (4 members)			Charlotte-Fundy
Charlotte	Charlotte (4 members)														St. Stephen-Milltown (1 member)	Charlotte (4 members)			St. Stephen-Milltown
Kings	Kings (2 members)								Kings (3 members)										Kings Centre
Kings	Kings (2 members)								Kings (3 members)										Kings East
Kings	Kings (2 members)								Kings (3 members)										Kings West
Northumberland	Northumberland (2 members)			Northumberland (2 members)	Northumberland (2 members)				Northumberland (4 members)									Northumberland (5 members)	Bay du Vin
Northumberland	Northumberland (2 members)			Northumberland (2 members)	Northumberland (2 members)				Northumberland (4 members)									Northumberland (5 members)	Chatham
Northumberland	Northumberland (2 members)			Northumberland (2 members)	Northumberland (2 members)				Northumberland (4 members)									Northumberland (5 members)	Miramichi Bay
Northumberland	Northumberland (2 members)			Northumberland (2 members)	Northumberland (2 members)				Northumberland (4 members)									Northumberland (5 members)	Miramichi-Newcastle
Northumberland	Northumberland (2 members)			Northumberland (2 members)	Northumberland (2 members)				Northumberland (4 members)									Northumberland (5 members)	Southwest Miramichi
Northumberland	Northumberland (2 members)			Northumberland (2 members)	Kent (1 member)	Kent (2 members)							Kent (3 members)						Kent Centre
Northumberland	Northumberland (2 members)			Northumberland (2 members)	Kent (1 member)	Kent (2 members)							Kent (3 members)						Kent North
Northumberland	Northumberland (2 members)			Northumberland (2 members)	Kent (1 member)	Kent (2 members)							Kent (3 members)						Kent South
Northumberland	Northumberland (2 members)			Gloucester (1 member)		Gloucester (2 members)	Gloucester (2 members)						Gloucester (3 members)	Gloucester (4 members)			Gloucester (5 members)	Gloucester (5 members)	Caraquet
Northumberland	Northumberland (2 members)			Gloucester (1 member)		Gloucester (2 members)	Gloucester (2 members)						Gloucester (3 members)	Gloucester (4 members)			Gloucester (5 members)	Gloucester (5 members)	Nepisiguit-Chaleur
Northumberland	Northumberland (2 members)			Gloucester (1 member)		Gloucester (2 members)	Gloucester (2 members)						Gloucester (3 members)	Gloucester (4 members)			Gloucester (5 members)	Gloucester (5 members)	Nigadoo-Chaleur
Northumberland	Northumberland (2 members)			Gloucester (1 member)		Gloucester (2 members)	Gloucester (2 members)						Gloucester (3 members)	Gloucester (4 members)			Gloucester (5 members)	Gloucester (5 members)	Shippagan-les-Îles
Northumberland	Northumberland (2 members)			Gloucester (1 member)		Gloucester (2 members)	Gloucester (2 members)						Gloucester (3 members)	Gloucester (4 members)			Gloucester (5 members)	Gloucester (5 members)	Tracadie
Northumberland	Northumberland (2 members)			Gloucester (1 member)		Gloucester (2 members)	Gloucester (2 members)						Gloucester (3 members)	Gloucester (4 members)			Gloucester (5 members)	Bathurst (1 member)	
Northumberland	Northumberland (2 members)			Gloucester (1 member)		Gloucester (2 members)	Restigouche (1 member)	Restigouche (2 members)									Restigouche (3 members)	Restigouche (3 members)	Dalhousie
Northumberland	Northumberland (2 members)			Gloucester (1 member)		Gloucester (2 members)	Restigouche (1 member)	Restigouche (2 members)									Restigouche (3 members)	Restigouche (3 members)	Restigouche East
Northumberland	Northumberland (2 members)			Gloucester (1 member)		Gloucester (2 members)	Restigouche (1 member)	Restigouche (2 members)									Restigouche (3 members)	Restigouche (3 members)	Restigouche West
Northumberland	Northumberland (2 members)			Gloucester (1 member)		Gloucester (2 members)	Restigouche (1 member)	Restigouche (2 members)									Restigouche (3 members)	Campbellton (1 member)	
Queens	Queens (2 members)																		Queens North
Queens	Queens (2 members)																		Queens South
Saint John	Saint John (6 members)	Saint John City (2 members)										Saint John City (4 members)						Saint John Centre (4 members)	Saint John Harbour
Saint John	Saint John (6 members)	Saint John City (2 members)										Saint John City (4 members)						Saint John Centre (4 members)	Saint John North
Saint John	Saint John (6 members)	Saint John City and County (4 members)										Saint John City (4 members)						Saint John Centre (4 members)	Saint John Park
Saint John	Saint John (6 members)	Saint John City and County (4 members)										Saint John City (4 members)						Saint John Centre (4 members)	Saint John South
Saint John	Saint John (6 members)	Saint John City and County (4 members)										Saint John County (2 members)						Saint John East (2 members)	East Saint John
Saint John	Saint John (6 members)	Saint John City and County (4 members)										Saint John County (2 members)						Saint John East (2 members)	Saint John-Fundy
Saint John	Saint John (6 members)	Saint John City and County (4 members)										Saint John County (2 members)						Saint John West (1 member)	
Sunbury	Sunbury (2 members)																		Oromocto
Sunbury	Sunbury (2 members)																		Sunbury
Westmorland	Westmorland (4 members)								Westmorland (4 members)					Westmorland (4 members)					Memramcook
Westmorland	Westmorland (4 members)								Westmorland (4 members)					Westmorland (4 members)					Petitcodiac
Westmorland	Westmorland (4 members)								Westmorland (4 members)					Westmorland (4 members)					Shediac
Westmorland	Westmorland (4 members)								Westmorland (4 members)					Westmorland (4 members)					Tantramar
Westmorland	Westmorland (4 members)								Westmorland (4 members)					Moncton (1 member)			Moncton (2 members)	Moncton (3 members)	Moncton East
Westmorland	Westmorland (4 members)								Westmorland (4 members)					Moncton (1 member)			Moncton (2 members)	Moncton (3 members)	Moncton North
Westmorland	Westmorland (4 members)								Westmorland (4 members)					Moncton (1 member)			Moncton (2 members)	Moncton (3 members)	Moncton West
Westmorland	Westmorland (4 members)								Albert (2 members)										Albert
Westmorland	Westmorland (4 members)								Albert (2 members)										Riverview
York	York (4 members)					York (4 members)									York (3 members)	York (4 members)		York (2 members)	York North
York	York (4 members)					York (4 members)									York (3 members)	York (4 members)		York (2 members)	York South
York	York (4 members)					York (4 members)									Fredericton (1 member)	York (4 members)		Fredericton (2 members)	Fredericton North
York	York (4 members)					York (4 members)									Fredericton (1 member)	York (4 members)		Fredericton (2 members)	Fredericton South
York	York (4 members)					Carleton (2 members)				Carleton (2 members)			Carleton (3 members)						Carleton Centre
York	York (4 members)					Carleton (2 members)				Carleton (2 members)			Carleton (3 members)						Carleton North
York	York (4 members)					Carleton (2 members)				Carleton (2 members)			Carleton (3 members)						Carleton South
York	York (4 members)					Carleton (2 members)				Victoria (2 members)	Victoria (1 member)		Victoria (2 members)						Grand Falls
York	York (4 members)					Carleton (2 members)				Victoria (2 members)	Victoria (1 member)		Victoria (2 members)						Victoria-Tobique
York	York (4 members)					Carleton (2 members)				Victoria (2 members)	Madawaska (1 member)		Madawaska (2 members)				Madawaska (3 members)	Madawaska (3 members)	Madawaska Centre
York	York (4 members)					Carleton (2 members)				Victoria (2 members)	Madawaska (1 member)		Madawaska (2 members)				Madawaska (3 members)	Madawaska (3 members)	Madawaska South
York	York (4 members)					Carleton (2 members)				Victoria (2 members)	Madawaska (1 member)		Madawaska (2 members)				Madawaska (3 members)	Madawaska (3 members)	Madawaska-les-Lacs
York	York (4 members)					Carleton (2 members)				Victoria (2 members)	Madawaska (1 member)		Madawaska (2 members)				Madawaska (3 members)	Edmundston (1 member)	
