= Speaker of the Legislative Assembly of New Brunswick =

Canadian provincial legislative officer

- Président de l'Assemblée législative du Nouveau-Brunswick
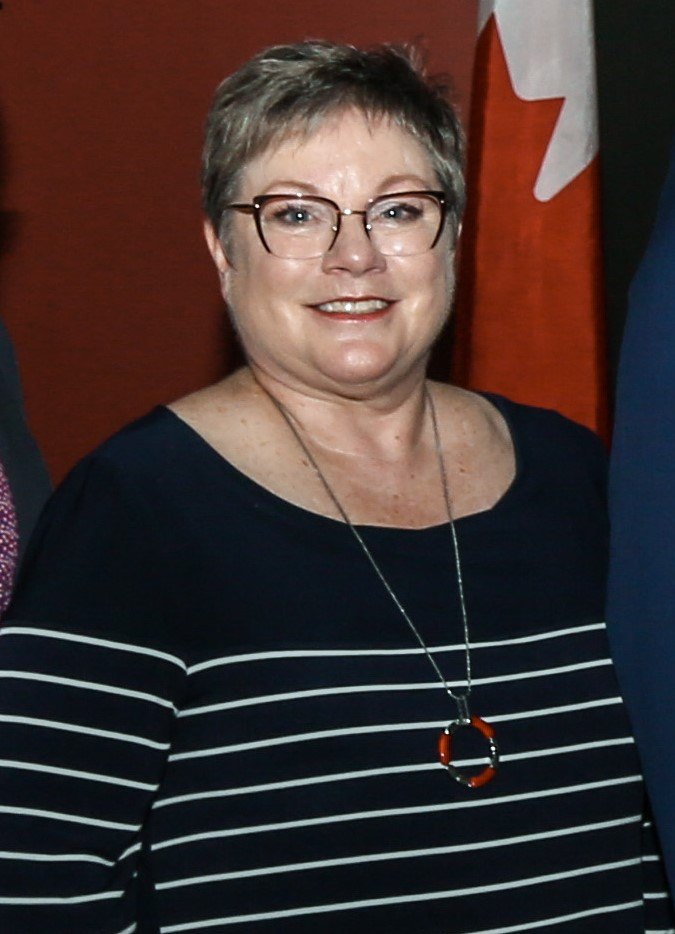
- Incumbent; Francine Landry since November 1, 2024
- Legislative Assembly of New Brunswick
- Member of: Legislative Assembly
- Seat: New Brunswick Legislative Building
- Formation: January 3, 1786
- First holder: Amos Botsford

The Speaker of the Legislative Assembly of New Brunswick is the presiding officer of the provincial legislature. Since 1994 the position has been elected by MLAs using a secret ballot. Previously, the Speaker had been appointed by motion of the house, in practice moved by the Premier of New Brunswick usually after consultation with the Leader of the Opposition. Shirley Dysart was the first Speaker to be elected by their peers.

The Speaker is usually a member of the governing party. The only recent exceptions have been Robert McCready and Michael Malley. McCready was appointed by motion of Premier Richard Hatfield following the close election of 1978. Hatfield's Progressive Conservative Party had won only 30 seats compared to the 28 seats won by the opposition Liberal Party. McCready was a member of the Liberal caucus and was appointed over the objection of the Liberal Party. The Liberal opposition argued on a point of order before the clerk of the assembly that precedent required that the opposition support the motion appointing speaker, but the clerk allowed the motion to be put and carried by the government. Malley was elected in 2006 while sitting as an independent. Malley had left the government caucus following a cabinet shuffle that had seen the incumbent speaker, Bev Harrison, join the cabinet leaving the post vacant. Malley argued that he should have been included in the cabinet for regional reasons and left the government caucus in protest; to prevent losing control of the legislature in a tenuous minority government situation, the Progressive Conservative caucus supported Malley as speaker. Malley later changed his party affiliation, amid some controversy, back to that of the governing Progressive Conservatives while occupying the speakership.

== List of speakers ==
No.	Name Electoral district (Birth–Death)	Term of office	Party	Legislature
1	Amos Botsford; MLA for Westmorland (1744/1745–1812)	1786–1812	Independent	1st
1	Amos Botsford; MLA for Westmorland (1744/1745–1812)	1786–1812	Independent	2nd
1	Amos Botsford; MLA for Westmorland (1744/1745–1812)	1786–1812	Independent	3rd
1	Amos Botsford; MLA for Westmorland (1744/1745–1812)	1786–1812	Independent	4th
1	Amos Botsford; MLA for Westmorland (1744/1745–1812)	1786–1812	Independent	5th
2	John Robinson; MLA for Saint John City (1762–1828)	1813–1816	Independent	5th
3	William Botsford; MLA for Westmorland (1773–1864)	1817–1823	Independent	6th
3	William Botsford; MLA for Westmorland (1773–1864)	1817–1823	Independent	7th
3	William Botsford; MLA for Westmorland (1773–1864)	1817–1823	Independent	8th
4	Ward Chipman Jr. MLA for Saint John County (1787–1851)	1824–1825	Independent	8th
5	Harry Peters; MLA for Saint John City (1788–1870)	1826–1827	Independent	8th
6	Richard Simonds; MLA for Northumberland (1789–1836)	1828	Independent	9th
7	Charles Simonds; MLA for Saint John County (1783–1859)	1829–1830	Independent	9th
7	Charles Simonds; MLA for Saint John County (1783–1859)	1829–1830	Independent	10th
8	William Crane; MLA for Westmorland (1785–1853)	1831–1834	Independent	10th
(7)	Charles Simonds; MLA for Saint John County (1783–1859)	1835–1842	Independent	11th
(7)	Charles Simonds; MLA for Saint John County (1783–1859)	1835–1842	Independent	12th
9	John Wesley Weldon; MLA for Kent (1809–1885)	1843–1850	Independent	13th
9	John Wesley Weldon; MLA for Kent (1809–1885)	1843–1850	Independent	14th
(7)	Charles Simonds; MLA for Saint John County (1783–1859)	1851	Independent	15th
(8)	William Crane; MLA for Westmorland (1785–1853)	1852–1853	Independent	15th
10	Daniel Hanington; MLA for Westmorland (1804–1889)	1853–1856	Independent	15th
10	Daniel Hanington; MLA for Westmorland (1804–1889)	1853–1856	Independent	16th
(7)	Charles Simonds; MLA for Saint John County (1783–1859)	1856–1857	Independent	17th
11	James A. Harding; MLA for Saint John City (1820–1893)	1857–1858	Independent	18th
12	John Mercer Johnson; MLA for Northumberland (1818–1868)	1859–1862	Independent	18th
12	John Mercer Johnson; MLA for Northumberland (1818–1868)	1859–1862	Independent	19th
13	John Campbell Allen; MLA for York (1817–1898)	1863–1864	Independent	19th
14	Edwin Arnold Vail; MLA for Kings (1817–1885)	1865–1866	Independent	20th
15	John Hamilton Gray; MLA for Saint John County (1814–1889)	1866–1867	Independent	21st
16	Bliss Botsford; MLA for Westmorland (1813–1890)	1868–1870	Independent	21st
(14)	Edwin Arnold Vail; MLA for Kings (1817–1885)	1871–1874	Independent	22nd
17	William Wedderburn; MLA for Saint John City (1834–1918)	1875–1878	Independent	23rd
18	Benjamin Robert Stephenson; MLA for Charlotte (1835–1890)	1879–1882	Independent	24th
19	James E. Lynott; MLA for Charlotte (1839–1890)	1883–1886	Independent	25th
20	William Pugsley; MLA for Kings (1850–1925)	1887–1889	Independent	26th
21	Albert Scott White; MLA for Kings (1855–1931)	1890–1892	Independent	27th
22	John Percival Burchill; MLA for Northumberland (1855–1923)	1893–1899	Independent	28th
22	John Percival Burchill; MLA for Northumberland (1855–1923)	1893–1899	Independent	29th
23	Clifford William Robinson; MLA for Westmorland (1866–1944)	1901–1907	Independent	30th
23	Clifford William Robinson; MLA for Westmorland (1866–1944)	1901–1907	Independent	31st
24	Charles J. Osman; MLA for Albert (1851–1922)	1907	Independent	31st
25	Donald Morrison; MLA for Northumberland (1852–1920)	1908	Independent	32nd
26	George Johnson Clarke; MLA for Charlotte (1857–1917)	1909–1914	Independent	32nd
26	George Johnson Clarke; MLA for Charlotte (1857–1917)	1909–1914	Independent	33rd
27	Walter B. Dickson; MLA for Albert (1847–1916)	1914–1916	Independent	33rd
28	Olivier-Maximin Melanson; MLA for Westmorland (1854–1926)	1916	Independent	33rd
29	William Currie; MLA for Restigouche (1862–1934)	1917–1918	Liberal	34th
30	Judson Hetherington; MLA for Queens (1866–1928)	1919–1920	Liberal	34th
31	Allison Dysart; MLA for Kent (1880–1962)	1921–1925	Liberal	35th
32	Joseph Leonard O'Brien; MLA for Northumberland (1895–1973)	1926–1930	Conservative	36th
33	Frederick C. Squires; MLA for Carleton (1881–1960)	1931–1935	Conservative	37th
34	Hedley Francis Gregory Bridges; MLA for Restigouche (1902–1947)	1936–1938	Liberal	38th
35	Frederic McGrand; MLA for Queens (1895–1988)	1940–1944	Liberal	39th
36	Harry O. Downey; MLA for Albert (1897–1974)	1945–1952	Liberal	40th
36	Harry O. Downey; MLA for Albert (1897–1974)	1945–1952	Liberal	41st
37	Elmor T. Kennedy; MLA for Kings (1885–1953)	1953	Progressive Conservative	42nd
38	Walter Powers; MLA for Victoria (1895–1954)	1954	Progressive Conservative	42nd
39	J. Arthur Moore; MLA for Queens (1891–1979)	1955–1960	Progressive Conservative	42nd
39	J. Arthur Moore; MLA for Queens (1891–1979)	1955–1960	Progressive Conservative	43rd
40	Ernest Richard; MLA for Gloucester (1922–2006)	1960–1963	Liberal	44th
41	Bernard Jean; MLA for Gloucester (1925–2012)	1963–1966	Liberal	45th
42	H. H. Williamson; MLA for Gloucester (1916–1972)	1966–1967	Liberal	45th
43	Robert McCready; MLA for Bathurst (1921–1995)	1968–1970	Liberal	46th
44	Lawrence Garvie; MLA for Fredericton (1933–2011)	1971–1973	Progressive Conservative	47th
45	William J. Woodroffe; MLA for Saint John East (until 1974); MLA for Saint John-Fundy (from 1974) (1933–2003)	1973–1978	Progressive Conservative	47th
45	William J. Woodroffe; MLA for Saint John East (until 1974); MLA for Saint John-Fundy (from 1974) (1933–2003)	1973–1978	Progressive Conservative	48th
(43)	Robert McCready; MLA for Queens South (1921–1995)	1979–1980	Liberal	49th
46	James N. Tucker Jr. MLA for Charlotte-Fundy (born 1934)	1981–1985	Progressive Conservative	49th
46	James N. Tucker Jr. MLA for Charlotte-Fundy (born 1934)	1981–1985	Progressive Conservative	50th
47	Charles Gallagher; MLA for Carleton North (1925–2007)	1985–1987	Progressive Conservative	50th
48	Frank Branch; MLA for Nepisiguit-Chaleur (1944–2018)	1987–1991	Liberal	51st
49	Shirley Dysart; MLA for Saint John Park (1928–2016)	1991–1994	Liberal	52nd
50	Gérald Clavette; MLA for Madawaska Centre (born 1941)	1994	Liberal	52nd
(49)	Shirley Dysart; MLA for Saint John Park (1928–2016)	1994–1995	Liberal	52nd
51	Danny Gay; MLA for Miramichi Bay (born 1950)	1995–1998	Liberal	53rd
52	John McKay; MLA for Miramichi Centre (born 1948)	1998–1999	Liberal	53rd
53	Bev Harrison; MLA for Hampton-Belleisle (born 1942)	1999–2006	Progressive Conservative	54th
53	Bev Harrison; MLA for Hampton-Belleisle (born 1942)	1999–2006	Progressive Conservative	55th
54	Michael Malley; MLA for Miramichi-Bay du Vin (born 1962)	2006	Progressive Conservative	55th
55	Eugene McGinley; MLA for Grand Lake-Gagetown (1935–2019)	2007	Liberal	56th
56	Roy Boudreau; MLA for Campbellton-Restigouche Centre (1946–2023)	2007–2010	Liberal	56th
57	Dale Graham; MLA for Carleton (born 1951)	2010–2014	Progressive Conservative	57th
58	Chris Collins; MLA for Moncton Centre (born 1951)	2014–2018	Liberal	58th
59	Daniel Guitard; MLA for Restigouche-Chaleur (born 1959)	2018–2020	Liberal	59th
60	Bill Oliver; MLA for Kings Centre (born 1959)	2020–2024	Progressive Conservative	60th
61	Francine Landry; MLA for Madawaska Les Lacs-Edmundston (born 1959)	2024–present	Liberal	61st
