= 47th New Brunswick Legislature =

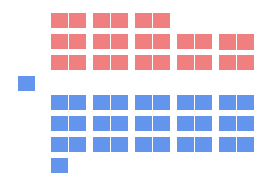
Rendition of party representation in the 47th New Brunswick Legislative Assembly decided by the 1970 election. Progressive Conservatives (32) Liberals (26)

The 47th New Brunswick Legislative Assembly represented New Brunswick between March 2, 1971, and October 11, 1974.

Wallace Samuel Bird was Lieutenant-Governor of New Brunswick in 1971. In October of that year, he was succeeded by Hédard Joseph Robichaud.

Lawrence Garvie was chosen as speaker in 1971. William J. Woodroffe became speaker in 1973.

The Progressive Conservative Party, led by Richard Hatfield, defeated the Liberals to form the government.

== Members ==
Electoral District	Name	Party	First elected / previously elected
Albert	Brenda Robertson	Progressive Conservative	1967
Albert	Malcolm MacLeod	Progressive Conservative	1970
Bathurst	H. H. Williamson (Note: died in 1972)	Liberal	1960
Bathurst	Eugene McGinley (1972)	Liberal	1972
Campbellton	J.C. Van Horne	Progressive Conservative	1967, (Note: Restigouche) 1968
Campbellton	Fernand Dubé (1974)	Progressive Conservative	1974
Carleton	Richard B. Hatfield	Progressive Conservative	1961
Carleton	Charles Gallagher	Progressive Conservative	1970
Carleton	Edison Stairs	Progressive Conservative	1960
Charlotte	G. W. N. Cockburn	Progressive Conservative	1967
Charlotte	Leland McGaw	Progressive Conservative	1967
Charlotte	John E. Rigby	Progressive Conservative	1967
Charlotte	DeCosta Young	Progressive Conservative	1967
Charlotte	James N. Tucker, Jr. (1973)	Progressive Conservative	1973
Edmundston	Jean-Maurice Simard	Progressive Conservative	1970
Fredericton	George Everett Chalmers	Progressive Conservative	1960
Fredericton	Lawrence Garvie	Progressive Conservative	1968
Gloucester	J. Omer Boudreau	Liberal	1963
Gloucester	André Robichaud	Liberal	1970
Gloucester	Bernard A. Jean (Note: resigned)	Liberal	1960
Gloucester	A. A. Ferguson	Liberal	1967
Gloucester	Frank Branch	Liberal	1970
Gloucester	Lorenzo Morais (1972)	Progressive Conservative	1972
Kent	Louis J. Robichaud	Liberal	1952
Kent	André F. Richard	Liberal	1956
Kent	Alan R. Graham	Liberal	1967
Kent	Omer Léger (1971)	Progressive Conservative	1971
Kings	John B.M. Baxter	Progressive Conservative	1962
Kings	Cyril B. Sherwood	Progressive Conservative	1952
Kings	George E. Horton	Progressive Conservative	1962
Madawaska	Gérald Clavette	Liberal	1967
Madawaska	Laurier Lévesque	Liberal	1960
Madawaska	Daniel Daigle	Liberal	1970
Moncton	Paul Creaghan	Progressive Conservative	1970
Moncton	Arthur Buck	Progressive Conservative	1970
Moncton	Jean-Paul LeBlanc	Progressive Conservative	1970
Northumberland	Frank E. Kane	Liberal	1969
Northumberland	Graham Crocker	Liberal	1960
Northumberland	Norbert Thériault	Liberal	1960
Northumberland	Edgar LeGresley	Liberal	1970
Northumberland	Clarence S. Menzies	Liberal	1960
Queens	Wilfred Bishop	Progressive Conservative	1952
Queens	Robert McCready	Liberal	1967
Restigouche	Edèse J. Bujold	Liberal	1970
Restigouche	Rayburn Doucett	Liberal	1970
Restigouche	J. Alfred Roussel	Liberal	1970
Saint John Centre	J. Lorne McGuigan	Progressive Conservative	1967
Saint John Centre	Eric L. Teed	Progressive Conservative	1970
Saint John Centre	Robert J. Higgins	Liberal	1967
Saint John Centre	George E. McInerney	Progressive Conservative	1952
Saint John Centre	John W. Turnbull (1973)	Liberal	1973
Saint John East	Charles A. McIlveen	Progressive Conservative	1960
Saint John East	William J. Woodroffe	Progressive Conservative	1967
Saint John East	Gerald Merrithew (1972)	Progressive Conservative	1972
Saint John West	Rodman Logan	Progressive Conservative	1963
Sunbury	Reginald W. Mabey	Progressive Conservative	1970
Sunbury	Horace Smith	Progressive Conservative	1970
Victoria	J. Stewart Brooks	Progressive Conservative	1952
Victoria	Joseph E. M. Ouellette	Progressive Conservative	1970
Westmorland	Joseph E. Leblanc	Liberal	1952
Westmorland	W. Wynn Meldrum	Liberal	1965
Westmorland	William J. McNevin	Liberal	1970
Westmorland	Cléophas Léger	Liberal	1952
York	Harry Ames (Note: died in 1973)	Progressive Conservative	1952
York	Carl Mooers	Progressive Conservative	1967
York	David Bishop (1974)	Progressive Conservative	1974

== Notes ==
Preceded by 46th New Brunswick Legislature	Legislative Assemblies of New Brunswick; 1970–1974	Succeeded by 48th New Brunswick Legislature
