= 48th New Brunswick Legislature =

US legislative assembly

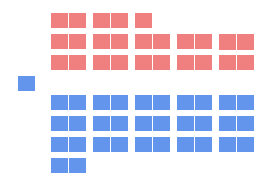
Rendition of party representation in the 48th New Brunswick Legislative Assembly following the 1974 election. Progressive Conservatives (33) Liberals (25)

The 48th New Brunswick Legislative Assembly was created following a general election in 1974. It was dissolved on September 15, 1978.

== Leadership ==
The speaker was William J. Woodroffe.

Premier Richard Hatfield led the government. The Progressive Conservative Party was the ruling party.

== Members ==
Electoral District	Name	Party	First elected / previously elected
Albert	Malcolm MacLeod	Progressive Conservative	1970
Bathurst	Eugene McGinley	Liberal	1972
Bay du Vin	Norbert Thériault	Liberal	1960
Campbellton	Fernand G. Dubé	Progressive Conservative	1974
Caraquet	Onil Doiron	Liberal	1974
Carleton Centre	Richard Hatfield	Progressive Conservative	1961
Carleton North	Charles Gallagher	Progressive Conservative	1970
Carleton South	A. Edison Stairs	Progressive Conservative	1960
Charlotte Centre	Decosta Young	Progressive Conservative	1967
Charlotte-Fundy	James N. Tucker, Jr.	Progressive Conservative	1973
Charlotte West	Leland McGaw	Progressive Conservative	1967
Chatham	Frank E. Kane	Liberal	1969
Dalhousie	John Potter	Progressive Conservative	1974
Edmundston	Jean-Maurice Simard	Progressive Conservative	1970
Fredericton North	Lawrence Garvie	Progressive Conservative	1968
Fredericton South	George Everett Chalmers	Progressive Conservative	1960
Grand Falls	Everard Daigle	Liberal	1974
Kent Centre	Alan R. Graham	Liberal	1967
Kent North	Joseph Daigle	Liberal	1974
Kent South	Omer Léger	Progressive Conservative	1971
Kings Centre	Harold Fanjoy	Progressive Conservative	1974
Kings East	George E. Horton	Progressive Conservative	1962
Kings West	John B.M. Baxter	Progressive Conservative	1962
Madawaska Centre	Gérald Clavette	Liberal	1967
Madawaska-les-Lacs	Jean-Pierre Ouellet	Progressive Conservative	1974
Madawaska South	Daniel Daigle	Liberal	1970
Memramcook	William Malenfant	Liberal	1974
Miramichi Bay	Edgar LeGresley	Liberal	1970
Miramichi-Newcastle	John McKay	Liberal	1974
Southwest Miramichi	Sterling Hambrook	Progressive Conservative	1974
Moncton East	Raymond Frenette	Liberal	1974
Moncton North	Michael McKee	Liberal	1974
Moncton West	Paul Creaghan	Progressive Conservative	1970
Nepisiguit-Chaleur	Frank Branch	Liberal	1970
Nigadoo-Chaleur	Roland Boudreau	Progressive Conservative	1974
Oromocto	LeRoy Washburn	Liberal	1974
Petitcodiac	Bill Harmer	Progressive Conservative	1974
Queens North	Wilfred Bishop	Progressive Conservative	1952
Queens South	Robert Corbett	Progressive Conservative	1974
Restigouche East	Rayburn Doucett	Liberal	1970
Restigouche West	Alfred Roussel	Liberal	1970
Riverview	Brenda Robertson	Progressive Conservative	1967
Saint John East	Gerald Merrithew	Progressive Conservative	1972
Saint John-Fundy	William J. Woodroffe	Progressive Conservative	1967
Saint John Harbour	John W. Turnbull	Liberal	1973
Saint John North	Shirley Dysart	Liberal	1974
Saint John Park	Robert J. Higgins	Liberal	1967
Saint John South	John Mooney	Liberal	1974
Saint John West	Rodman Logan	Progressive Conservative	1963
St. Stephen-Milltown	William Cockburn	Progressive Conservative	1967
Shediac	Azor LeBlanc	Liberal	1974
Shippagan-les-Îles	André Robichaud	Liberal	1970
Sunbury	Horace Smith	Progressive Conservative	1970
Tantramar	Lloyd Folkins	Progressive Conservative	1974
Tracadie	Adjutor Ferguson	Liberal	1967
Victoria-Tobique	J. Stewart Brooks (Note: resigned)	Progressive Conservative	1952
Victoria-Tobique	J. Douglas Moore (1976)	Progressive Conservative	1976
York North	David Bishop	Progressive Conservative	1974
York South	Les Hull	Progressive Conservative	1974

== See also ==
- 1974 New Brunswick general election

== Notes ==
Preceded by 47th Assembly	New Brunswick Legislative Assemblies; 1974–1978	Succeeded by 49th Assembly
