= 51st New Brunswick Legislature =

Canadian provincial assembly

- Majority parliament
- c. 1987 – Aug. 22, 1991

Parliament leaders
- Premier: Frank McKenna
- Leader of the Opposition: Camille Thériault

Party caucuses
- Government: Liberal Party
- Opposition: Liberal Party shadow cabinet*
- * The Liberal Party won every seat in the Assembly, so Premier McKenna named several members of his own caucus to act as an opposition.

Legislative Assembly
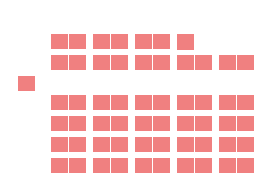
- Seating arrangements of the Legislative Assembly
- Speaker of the Assembly: Frank Branch
- Members: 58 MLA seats

Sovereign
- Monarch: Elizabeth II; 6 February 1952 – 8 September 2022
← 50th	→ 52nd

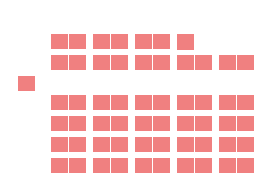
Rendition of party representation in the 51st New Brunswick Legislative Assembly following the 1987 election. Liberals (58)

The 51st New Brunswick Legislative Assembly was created following a general election in 1987. It was dissolved on August 22, 1991.

== Leadership ==
The speaker was Frank Branch.

Premier Frank McKenna led the government. The Liberal Party won all the seats; but to ensure the proper functioning of the parliamentary system, Frank McKenna named several members of his own caucus, led by Camille Thériault, to serve as the Official Opposition. The government also allowed the Progressive Conservative Party, which finished second place in the election in the number of votes received, to submit written questions to ministers during Question Period.

== Members ==
All were elected in the 31st general election held on October 13, 1987, except for Denis Losier, who was elected in a by-election held after Doug Young resigned his seat.

== List of Members ==
Electoral District	Name	Party	First elected / previously elected
Albert	Harold A. Terris	Liberal	1987
Bathurst	Paul Kenny	Liberal	1978
Bay du Vin	Reginald MacDonald	Liberal	1979, 1987
Campbellton	Edmond Blanchard	Liberal	1987
Caraquet	Bernard Thériault	Liberal	1987
Carleton Centre	Allison DeLong	Liberal	1987
Carleton North	Fred Harvey	Liberal	1987
Carleton South	Bruce A. Smith	Liberal	1987
Charlotte Centre	Sheldon Lee	Liberal	1978
Charlotte-Fundy	Eric Allaby	Liberal	1987
Charlotte West	Reid Hurley	Liberal	1987
Chatham	Frank McKenna	Liberal	1982
Dalhousie	Allan E. Maher	Liberal	1978
Edmundston	Roland Beaulieu	Liberal	1986
Fredericton North	Jim Wilson	Liberal	1987
Fredericton South	Russell H.T. King	Liberal	1987
Grand Falls	Paul Duffie	Liberal	1987
Kent Centre	Alan R. Graham	Liberal	1967
Kent North	Conrad Landry	Liberal	1982
Kent South	Camille Thériault	Liberal	1987
Kings Centre	Kal Seaman	Liberal	1987
Kings East	Pete Dalton	Liberal	1987
Kings West	Laureen Jarrett	Liberal	1987
Madawaska Centre	Gérald Clavette	Liberal	1967, 1987
Madawaska-les-Lacs	Georges Corriveau	Liberal	1987
Madawaska South	Pierrette Ringuette	Liberal	1987
Memramcook	Gregory H. O'Donnell	Liberal	1987
Miramichi Bay	Danny Gay	Liberal	1987
Miramichi-Newcastle	John McKay	Liberal	1974, 1987
Moncton East	Raymond Frenette	Liberal	1974
Moncton North	Michael McKee	Liberal	1974
Moncton West	James E. Lockyer	Liberal	1987
Nepisiguit-Chaleur	Frank Branch †	Liberal	1970
Nigadoo-Chaleur	Pierre Godin	Liberal	1978
Oromocto	Tom Gilbert	Liberal	1987
Petitcodiac	Hollis Steeves	Liberal	1987
Queens North	Doug Tyler	Liberal	1987
Queens South	Vaughn Blaney	Liberal	1987
Restigouche East	Rayburn Doucett	Liberal	1970
Restigouche West	Jean-Paul Savoie	Liberal	1987
Riverview	Hubert Seamans	Liberal	1985
Saint John East	Peter Trites	Liberal	1984 (Note: First elected as a NDP)
Saint John-Fundy	Stuart Jamieson	Liberal	1987
Saint John Harbour	Louis Murphy	Liberal	1978
Saint John North	Leo McAdam	Liberal	1987
Saint John Park	Shirley Dysart	Liberal	1974
Saint John South	John Mooney	Liberal	1974, 1987
Saint John West	Jane Barry	Liberal	1987
Shediac	Azor LeBlanc	Liberal	1974
Shippagan-les-Îles	Aldéa Landry	Liberal	1987
Southwest Miramichi	Morris Vernon Green	Liberal	1978
St. Stephen-Milltown	Ann Breault	Liberal	1987
Sunbury	Doug Harrison	Liberal	1987
Tantramar	Marilyn Trenholme	Liberal	1987
Tracadie	M. Douglas Young (resigned)	Liberal	1978
Tracadie	Denis Losier (elected on November 14, 1988)	Liberal	1988
Victoria-Tobique	Larry Kennedy	Liberal	1987
York North	Bob Simpson	Liberal	1987
York South	Al Lacey	Liberal	1987

Italics denotes a party leader
† denotes the Speaker

== See also ==
- 1987 New Brunswick general election
- Legislative Assembly of New Brunswick

== Notes ==
Preceded by 50th Assembly	New Brunswick Legislative Assemblies; 1987–1991	Succeeded by 52nd Assembly
