= 52nd New Brunswick Legislature =

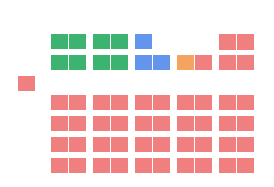
Rendition of party representation in the 52nd New Brunswick Legislative Assembly, at its first session after the 1991 election. Liberal MLAs (46) Confederation of Regions MLAs (8) Progressive Conservative MLAs (3) New Democratic MLAs (1)

The 52nd New Brunswick Legislative Assembly was created following a general election in 1991 and was dissolved on August 12, 1995.

== Leadership ==
The speaker from its first meeting until April 25, 1994, was Shirley Dysart, Dysart stepped down as speaker at the request of the government who wanted to appoint Gérald Clavette as speaker. When the legislature met in the fall, Clavette was appointed speaker by motion and shortly thereafter the House adopted new rules to elect the speaker by secret ballot. Clavette resigned to re-seek the office of Speaker under the new rules and was defeated by Dysart who returned to the speakership for the balance of the life of the assembly.

Premier Frank McKenna led the government for the life of the assembly.

The opposition was led for the life of the assembly by Danny Cameron, despite various changes in Cameron's status as leader of the New Brunswick Confederation of Regions Party. In 1994, when there became an equality of members (six each) between CoR and the Progressive Conservatives, the Speaker ruled that CoR would retain its position as the official opposition.

Dennis Cochrane led the Progressive Conservatives for the life of the assembly.

Elizabeth Weir led the New Democrats for the life of the assembly.

== Members ==
All were elected in the 32nd general election held on September 11, 1991, except for

- John Lebans elected in a by-election on February 15, 1993
- Dale Graham elected in a by-election on June 28, 1993
- Percy Mockler elected in a by-election on November 29, 1993
- Elvy Robichaud elected in a by-election on September 26, 1994,

Three members left their respective caucuses over the course of the assembly to sit as independents:

- Beverly Brine, a former Confederation of Regions member
- Brent Taylor, a former Confederation of Regions member
- Jean Gauvin, a former Progressive Conservative

=== Members at dissolution ===
Electoral District	Name	Party	First elected / previously elected
Albert	Beverly Brine	Confederation of Regions	1991
Albert	Beverly Brine	Independent	1991
Bathurst	Marcelle Mersereau	Liberal	1991
Bay du Vin	Reginald MacDonald	Liberal	1979, 1987
Campbellton	Edmond Blanchard	Liberal	1987
Caraquet	Bernard Thériault	Liberal	1987
Carleton Centre	Allison DeLong	Liberal	1987
Carleton North	Fred Harvey	Liberal	1987
Carleton North	Dale Graham (1993)	Progressive Conservative	1993
Carleton South	Bruce A. Smith	Liberal	1987
Charlotte Centre	Sheldon Lee	Liberal	1978
Charlotte-Fundy	Eric Allaby	Liberal	1987
Charlotte West	Reid Hurley	Liberal	1987
Chatham	Frank McKenna	Liberal	1982
Dalhousie	Allan E. Maher	Liberal	1978
Edmundston	Roland Beaulieu	Liberal	1986
Fredericton North	Edwin G. Allen	Confederation of Regions	1978, (Note: First elected as a Progressive Conservative) 1991
Fredericton South	Russell H. T. King	Liberal	1987
Grand Falls	Paul Duffie	Liberal	1987
Kent Centre	Alan R. Graham	Liberal	1967
Kent North	Conrad Landry	Liberal	1982
Kent South	Camille Thériault	Liberal	1987
Kings Centre	Georgie Day	Liberal	1991
Kings East	Hazen Myers	Progressive Conservative	1978, 1991
Kings West	Laureen Jarrett	Liberal	1987
Madawaska Centre	Gérald Clavette	Liberal	1967, 1987
Madawaska-les-Lacs	Georges Corriveau	Liberal	1987
Madawaska South	Pierrette Ringuette	Liberal	1987
Madawaska South	Percy Mockler (1993)	Progressive Conservative	1982, 1993
Memramcook	Greg O'Donnell	Liberal	1987
Miramichi Bay	Danny Gay	Liberal	1987
Miramichi-Newcastle	John McKay	Liberal	1974, 1987
Moncton East	Raymond Frenette	Liberal	1974
Moncton North	Michael McKee	Liberal	1974
Moncton North	John Lebans (1993)	Liberal	1993
Moncton West	James E. Lockyer	Liberal	1987
Nepisiguit-Chaleur	Frank Branch	Liberal	1970
Nigadoo-Chaleur	Albert Doucet	Liberal	1991
Oromocto	Ab Rector	Confederation of Regions	1991
Petitcodiac	Dennis Cochrane	Progressive Conservative	1991
Queens North	Doug Tyler	Liberal	1987
Queens South	Vaughn Blaney	Liberal	1987
Restigouche East	Rayburn Doucett	Liberal	1970
Restigouche West	Jean-Paul Savoie	Liberal	1987
Riverview	Gordon Willden	Confederation of Regions	1991
Saint John East	George J. Jenkins	Liberal	1991
Saint John-Fundy	Stuart Jamieson	Liberal	1987
Saint John Harbour	Louis Murphy	Liberal	1978
Saint John North	Leo McAdam	Liberal	1987
Saint John Park	Shirley Dysart †	Liberal	1974
Saint John South	Elizabeth Weir	New Democratic	1991
Saint John West	Jane Barry	Liberal	1987
Shediac	Bernard Richard	Liberal	1991
Shippagan-les-Îles	Jean Gauvin	Progressive Conservative	1978, 1991
Shippagan-les-Îles	Jean Gauvin	Independent	1978, 1991
Southwest Miramichi	Brent Taylor	Confederation of Regions	1991
Southwest Miramichi	Brent Taylor	Independent	1991
St. Stephen-Milltown	Ann Breault	Liberal	1987
Sunbury	Max White	Confederation of Regions	1991
Tantramar	Marilyn Trenholme	Liberal	1987
Tracadie	Denis Losier	Liberal	1988
Tracadie	Elvy Robichaud (1994)	Progressive Conservative	1994
Victoria-Tobique	Larry Kennedy	Liberal	1987
York North	Gregory James Hargrove	Confederation of Regions	1991
York South	Danny Cameron	Confederation of Regions	1991

Italics denotes a party leader
† denotes the Speaker

=== Former members ===
- Fred Harvey, a Liberal, was first elected to the legislature in the 1987 election, resigned after being convicted of election fraud.
- Michael McKee, a Liberal, was first elected to the legislature in the 1974 election, resigned after being appointed a judge.
- Pierrette Ringuette, a Liberal, was first elected to the legislature in the 1987 election, resigned after being elected to the House of Commons of Canada.
- Denis Losier, a Liberal, was first elected to the legislature in a 1988 by-election and resigned in 1994.
- John Lebans, a Liberal, was first elected to the legislature in a 1993 by-election, he resigned on June 26, 1995

== See also ==
- 1991 New Brunswick general election
- Legislative Assembly of New Brunswick

== Notes ==
Preceded by 51st Assembly	New Brunswick Legislative Assemblies; 1991–1995	Succeeded by 53rd Assembly
