= Wayne Long =

Canadian politician

The Honourable Wayne Long PC MP
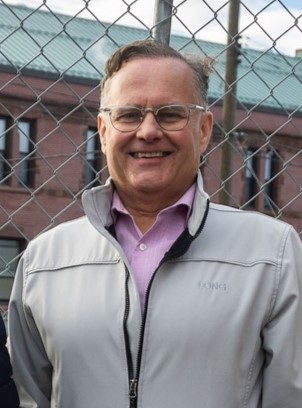
- Long in 2024

Secretary of State (Canada Revenue Agency and financial institutions)
- Incumbent
- Assumed office May 13, 2025
- Prime Minister: Mark Carney
- Preceded by: Élisabeth Brière

Member of Parliament for Saint John—Kennebecasis Saint John—Rothesay (2015-2025)
- Incumbent
- Assumed office October 19, 2015
- Preceded by: Rodney Weston

Personal details
- Born: April 13, 1963 (age 63) Saint John, New Brunswick
- Party: Liberal
- Profession: Hockey Executive; Businessman

Wayne Long PC MP (born April 13, 1963) is a Canadian politician who was elected to represent the riding of Saint John—Rothesay (now Saint John—Kennebecasis) in the House of Commons of Canada for the Liberal party in the 2015 federal election. He has since been re-elected three times. In 2025, he was assigned a cabinet role as the Secretary of State responsible for the Canada Revenue Agency and financial institutions.

Long was the president of the Saint John Sea Dogs QMJHL team from 2005 to 2015.

== Political career ==
As the Liberal Party's nominee in Saint John—Rothesay, Long drew media attention for his outspoken support of the Energy East oil pipeline project. Long's position was far more forthright than that of the Liberal Party as a whole, which had promised to take a neutral stance. Long promised to aggressively lobby within the Liberal caucus to support the project.

In September 2017, Long made headlines for announcing his opposition to tax changes for private corporations proposed by Liberal Finance Minister Bill Morneau. On October 4, 2017, he was the only Liberal MP to vote for a Conservative Party opposition motion to extend the consultation period.

In February 2021, alongside Nathaniel Erskine-Smith, Long was one of only two Liberal MPs to vote in favour of an NDP-proposed motion to take a first step towards developing a national pharmacare system. The bill, proposed by Peter Julian, would have established the conditions for federal financial contributions to provincial drug insurance plans. The following year, the Liberal Party would commit to work towards a "universal national pharmacare program" as part of their confidence and supply agreement with the NDP following the 2021 federal election.

On December 13, 2023, a video emerged showing Long arguing with protesters calling for a ceasefire in the Gaza war during a scheduled holiday celebration for the Liberal Party. Staff member Jeannette Arsenault, who accompanied him, accused the protesters of "believing in terrorism." The following month, Long apologized for his remarks in a statement released on Facebook.

On June 24, 2024, the Liberals lost the Toronto—St. Paul's by-election, a seat vacated by former minister Carolyn Bennett and represented by the Liberals since 1993, and the first time the Liberals lost a seat that they had held prior to a by-election during the 44th Parliament. In the aftermath of the by-election loss, Long became the first Liberal MP to call on Trudeau publicly to resign. In the 2025 Liberal Party of Canada leadership election, he endorsed Mark Carney. Long initially intended not to seek re-election in the 2025 federal election prior to the resignation of Trudeau, but later announced that he would seek re-election if Carney wins leadership.

== Electoral record ==
2025 Canadian federal election: Saint John—Kennebecasis
Party	Candidate	Votes	%	±%	Expenditures
Liberal	Wayne Long	26,129	58.11	+15.51	$89,086.94
Conservative	Melissa Young	16,787	37.33	+0.94	$118,235.65
New Democratic	Armand Cormier	1,206	2.68	-10.50	$915.35
Green	David MacFarquhar	737	1.64	-1.29	$7,442.76
Libertarian	Austin Venedam	108	0.24	N/A	$0.00
Total valid votes		44,967	99.43	–0.02	$120,580.81
Total rejected ballots		257	0.57	+0.02	
Turnout		45,224	70.01	+9.44	
Eligible voters (Note: Number of eligible voters does not include election day registrations.)		64,595			
Liberal notional hold		Swing		+7.28	
Source: Elections Canada

2021 Canadian federal election: Saint John—Rothesay
Party	Candidate	Votes	%	±%	Expenditures
Liberal	Wayne Long	17,371	46.38	+8.94	$86,136.71
Conservative	Mel Norton	12,315	32.88	-1.07	$89,711.32
New Democratic	Don Paulin	4,821	12.87	+0.64	$4,012.75
People's	Nicholas Pereira	2,001	5.34	+2.29	$3,899.08
Green	Ann McAllister	948	2.53	-7.57	$365.47
Total valid votes/expense limit		37,456	–	–	$103,960.22
Total rejected ballots					
Turnout			58.99	-6.19	
Registered voters		63,495			
Liberal hold		Swing		+5.01	
Source: Elections Canada

2019 Canadian federal election: Saint John—Rothesay
Party	Candidate	Votes	%	±%	Expenditures
Liberal	Wayne Long	15,443	37.43	-11.37	$65,376.07
Conservative	Rodney Weston	14,006	33.95	+3.41	$98,624.09
New Democratic	Armand Cormier	5,046	12.23	-5.30	$2,746.93
Green	Ann McAllister	4,165	10.10	+6.97	none listed
People's	Adam J. C. Salesse	1,260	3.05		none listed
Independent	Stuart Jamieson	1,183	2.87		$6,611.27
Independent	Neville Barnett	150	0.36		$170.00
Total valid votes/expense limit		41,253	99.40		
Total rejected ballots		250	0.60	+0.12	
Turnout		41,503	65.18	-3.65	
Eligible voters		63,677			
Liberal hold		Swing		-7.39	
Source: Elections Canada

2015 Canadian federal election: Saint John—Rothesay
Party	Candidate	Votes	%	±%	Expenditures
Liberal	Wayne Long	20,634	48.80	+32.81	–
Conservative	Rodney Weston	12,915	30.54	-19.18	–
New Democratic	AJ Griffin	7,411	17.53	-13.2	–
Green	Sharon Murphy	1,321	3.12	+0.35	–
Total valid votes/expense limit		42,281	100.0		$196,334.01
Total rejected ballots		205	–	–	
Turnout		42,486	69.38	–	
Eligible voters		61,236			
Source: Elections Canada

Order of precedence
Preceded by Anna Gainey as Secretary of State	Order of Precedence of Canada as Secretary of State	Succeeded by Stephanie McLean as Secretary of State
