= John Potter (Canadian politician) =

Canadian politician

Member of the Legislative Assembly of New Brunswick
- In office 1974–1978
- Succeeded by: Allan E. Maher
- Constituency: Dalhousie

Personal details
- Born: November 11, 1911 Moncton, New Brunswick
- Died: 1985 (aged 73–74)
- Party: Progressive Conservative Party of New Brunswick
- Spouse: Marjorie Roberta MacNaughton
- Children: 3
- Education: Mount Allison University; McGill University
- Occupation: Physician

John McBeath Potter (November 11, 1911 – 1985) was a Canadian politician. He served in the Legislative Assembly of New Brunswick from 1974 to 1978 as member of the Progressive Conservative party from the riding of Dalhousie.
