= 1991 New Brunswick general election =

Canadian provincial election

- September 23, 1991

58 seats of the Legislative Assembly of New Brunswick 30 seats needed for a majority
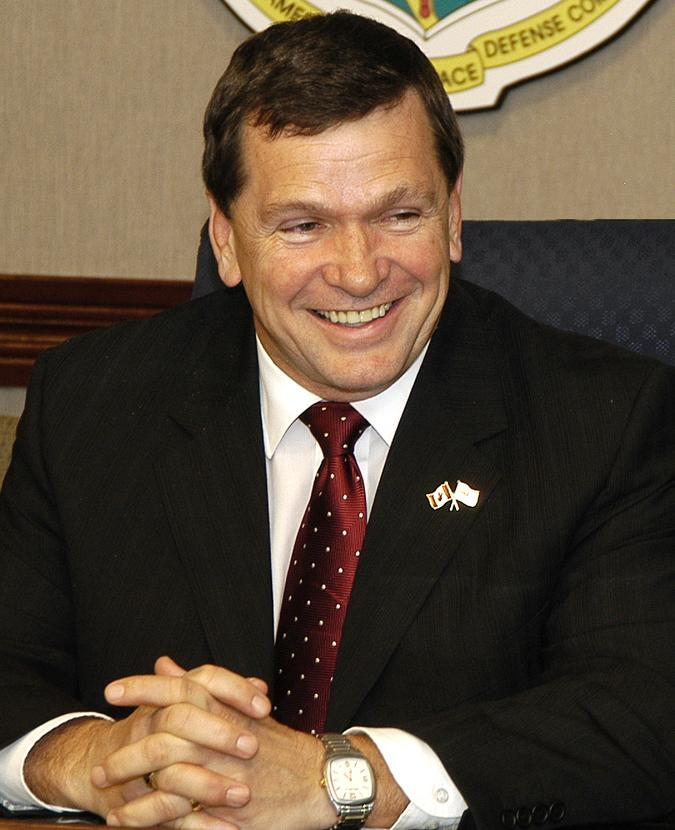
	First party	Second party
		CoR
Leader	Frank McKenna	Arch Pafford
Party	Liberal	Confederation of Regions
Leader since	1985	1989
Leader's seat	Chatham	Ran in Miramichi-Newcastle (lost)
Last election	58 seats, 60.39%	New party
Seats won	46	8
Seat change	▼12	▲8
Popular vote	193,890	87,256
Percentage	47.11%	21.18%
Swing	▼13.28pp	New party
	Third party	Fourth party
	PC	NDP
Leader	Dennis Cochrane	Elizabeth Weir
Party	Progressive Conservative	New Democratic
Leader since	1990	1988
Leader's seat	Petitcodiac	Saint John South
Last election	0 seats, 28.59%	0 seats, 10.55%
Seats won	3	1
Seat change	▲3	▲1
Popular vote	85,210	44,384
Percentage	20.69%	10.78%
Swing	▼7.89pp	▲0.23pp
- Popular vote by riding. As this is an FPTP election, seat totals are not determined by popular vote, but instead via results by each riding.
Premier before election
Frank McKenna
Liberal
Premier after election
Frank McKenna
Liberal

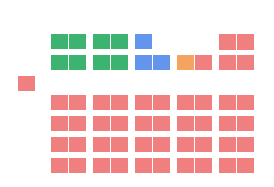
Rendition of party representation in the 52nd New Brunswick Legislative Assembly decided by this election. Liberals (46) Confederation of Regions (8) Progressive Conservatives (3) New Democrats (1)

The 1991 New Brunswick general election was held on September 23, 1991, to elect 58 members to the 52nd New Brunswick Legislative Assembly, the governing house of the province of New Brunswick, Canada.

As expected, the Liberal Party won a large majority. Many were surprised that the Confederation of Regions Party formed the official opposition. Though they ran even with the PCs in popular vote, their concentration of support in rural anglophone ridings gave them considerably more seats. Weir's personal popularity and name recognition was not enough to give her party more seats as she, and the Tories, had votes relatively evenly spread around the province.

== Background ==
Though Frank McKenna's Liberals were expected to win a second term after sweeping all 58 seats in 1987, any of the other three parties were considered contenders for official opposition.

The New Democratic Party was led by Elizabeth Weir, who had been the strongest and most consistent voice of opposition to the Liberals since her election as party leader in 1988. In the ensuing three years, thanks to the lack of opposition members in the legislature (MLAs), her firebrand style had made her a well-known name in New Brunswick politics.

The fledgling Confederation of Regions Party had been created out of the ashes of the Hatfield Tories when the latter went from majority government to zero seats in 1987. CoR was running numerous former Tory MLAs and candidates, and even some former Tory cabinet ministers. Its base of support was in English-speaking regions of New Brunswick, where many conservatives had become alienated by Hatfield's close relationship with Acadians.

The Progressive Conservatives had been in power for the majority of years since confederation, and 17 straight years before 1987. Even so, the scandals of the final Hatfield years and the growing unpopularity of the federal Progressive Conservatives hindered their success. Additionally they had perceived internal problems having gone through four leaders since the last election: Hatfield, then two-year interim leader Malcolm MacLeod then Barbara Baird, and then Dennis Cochrane.

== Opinion polls ==
Evolution of voting intentions at provincial level
Polling firm	Last day of survey	Source	NBLA	CoR	NBPC	NBNDP	Other	ME	Sample
Election 1991	September 23, 1991		47.11	21.18	20.69	10.78	0.24		
Baseline Research	August 1991		51	15	19	13	—N/a	4	350
Baseline Research	August 1991		51	15	22	10	—N/a	4	350
Baseline Research	July 1991		53	—N/a	18	—N/a	—N/a	—N/a	350
Omnifacts	June 1991		37	—N/a	8	17	—N/a	—N/a	—N/a
Baseline Research	January 1991		58	15	8	19	—N/a	—N/a	350
Baseline Research	March 1990		58	12	17	13	—N/a	—N/a	—N/a
Baseline Research	January 1990		58	12	17	13	—N/a	—N/a	358
Baseline Research	June 1989		63	9	17	—N/a	—N/a	6	—N/a
New Brunswick Confederation of Regions Party founded (1989)
Election 1987	October 13, 1987		60.39	-	28.59	10.55	0.47		

== Close results ==
A number of races were close 2 or 3 way contests with only a small fraction of votes separating the winner from the losers. The tables below highlight the seats that the three major parties missed by less than 10 percentage points (pp) and the margins between them and the winner.

Liberal	Confederation of Regions	Progressive Conservative
1. Riverview (-0.27pp from CoR); 2. Kings East (-0.33pp from PC); 3. Shippegan-les-îles (-0.51pp from PC); 4. Petitcodiac (-1.16pp from PC); 5. Saint John South (-1.82pp from NDP); 6. Southwest Miramichi (-2.35pp from CoR); 7. Oromocto (-2.94pp from CoR); 8. York South (-6.68pp from CoR)	1. Queens North (-0.20pp from Lib); 2. Petitcodiac (-0.60pp from PC); 3. Kings Centre (-1.37pp from Lib); 4. Saint John East (-1.56pp from Lib); 5. Saint John Fundy (-4.91pp from Lib); 6. Miramichi-Newcastle (-7.52pp from Lib); 7. Carleton South (-7.55pp from Lib); 8. Kings East (-9.17pp from PC); 9. Queens South (-9.19pp from Lib)	1. Carleton North (-2.55pp from Lib); 2. Saint John Fundy (-2.56pp from Lib); 3. Miramichi-Newcastle (-3.50pp from Lib); 4. Kings Centre (-6.81pp from Lib)

== Results ==
=== Results by party ===
Summary of the 1991 Legislative Assembly of New Brunswick election results
Party	Party leader	# of candidates	Seats				Popular vote		
Party	Party leader	# of candidates	1987	Dissolution	**Elected**	% Change	#	%	Change
Liberal	Frank McKenna	58	58	58	**46**	-20.7%	193,890	47.11%	-13.28%
Confederation of Regions	Arch Pafford	48	-	0	**8**	-	87,256	21.18%	-
Progressive Conservative	Dennis Cochrane	58	0	0	**3**	-	85,210	20.69%	-7.89%
New Democratic	Elizabeth Weir	58	0	0	**1**	-	44,384	10.78%	+0.23%
Independent		2	-	-	-		850	0.21%	-0.26%
**Total**		**224**	**58**	**58**	**58**	-	**411,590**	**100%**	
Source: http://www.gnb.ca/elections

Popular vote
Liberal	47.11%
Conf. of Regions	21.18%
PC	20.69%
New Democratic	10.78%
Others	0.24%

Seats summary
Liberal	79.31%
Conf. of Regions	13.79%
PC	5.17%
New Democratic	1.72%

=== Results by region ===
Party Name		North	Central	South West	South East	Total
Liberal	Seats:	15	8	14	9	46
Liberal	Popular Vote:	57.0	40.1	39.8	51.4	47.1
Confederation of Regions	Seats:	0	6	0	2	8
Confederation of Regions	Popular Vote:	5.8	35.4	25.6	17.8	21.2
Progressive Conservative	Seats:	1	0	1	1	3
Progressive Conservative	Popular Vote:	23.6	19.2	21.3	18.6	20.7
New Democratic	Seats:	0	0	1	0	1
New Democratic	Popular Vote:	13.0	5.2	13.3	12.1	10.8
Total seats:		16	14	16	12	58

=== Results by riding ===
Legend

- **bold** denotes party leader
- † denotes an incumbent who is not running for re-election

==== North ====
Consisting of Victoria, Madawaska, Restigouche and Gloucester county ridings.

Electoral district	Candidates					Incumbent
Electoral district	Liberal	CoR	PC	NDP	Other	Incumbent
Victoria-Tobique	Larry R. Kennedy 2,854	Carl Skaarup 1,580	Neville J. Crabbe 1,664	Cheryl Ann Elizabeth Pelkey 308		Larry Kennedy
Grand Falls	Paul Duffie 3,617	Roy Simon Dee 197	Léo R. Thériault 1,209	Clyde Winchester 207		Paul Duffie
Madawaska-les-Lacs	Georges Corriveau 2,906		Raout Cyr 2,211	Gérard Caron 601		Georges Corriveau
Madawaska Centre	Gérald Clavette 2,942		Don Marmen 1,706	Jean-Marie St-Onge 412		Gérald Clavette
Edmundston	Roland Beaulieu 3,686		Patrick Dalpé 1,156	Réal Couturier 719		Roland Beaulieu
Madawaska South	Pierrette Ringuette 2,843		Théo Poitras 1,715	Julien Tardif 209		Pierrette Ringuette
Restigouche West	Jean Paul Savoie 3,922	Robert A. Boudreau 517	Félix J. Dubé 2,524	Rino Pelletier 302		Jean Paul Savoie
Campbellton	Edmond Blanchard 3,599	Ronald Rioux 1,062	Bill Ferguson 934	Douglas Gordon Kingston 593		Edmond Blanchard
Dalhousie	Allan Maher 2,804	Isabelle Ann Culverwell Davis 451	Scott Chedore 608	Aurele Ferlotte 1,927		Allan Maher
Restigouche East	Rayburn Doucett 3,023	Norman Shea 381	Richard Lapointe 294	Walter Gauthier Jr. 1,241		Rayburn Doucett
Nigadoo-Chaleur	Albert Doucet 4,732		David Boudreau 466	Raoul Charest 1,696	Ulric DeGrace (Ind.) 714	Albert Doucet
Nepisiguit-Chaleur	Frank Branch 3,752	Laurie Alan Daley 760	Robert Hornibrook 616	Karen Ann McCrea 1,172		Frank Branch
Bathurst	Marcelle Mersereau 4,047	Laurie Joseph Robichaud 1,280	Claire Wilt 1,025	Colette Buttimer 832		Paul Kenny†
Caraquet	Bernard Thériault 5,298		Gilbert Godin 2,279	Roger Duguay 2,167		Bernard Thériault
Shippagan-les-Îles	Aldéa Landry 4,831		Jean Gauvin 4,881	John Gagnon 128		Aldéa Landry
Tracadie	Denis Losier 6,374		Colette McGraw 2,103	Pierre Cousineau 1,427		Denis Losier

==== Central ====
Consisting of Carleton, York, Sunbury and Northumberland county ridings.

Electoral district	Candidates					Incumbent
Electoral district	Liberal	CoR	PC	NDP	Other	Incumbent
Carleton North	Fred Harvey 2,163	Jack Salmon 857	Dale Graham 2,032	Anna Marie Kilfoil 84		Fred Harvey
Carleton Centre	Allison DeLong 2,087	Lois M. Clark 1,281	Mary Hatfield 1,387	Linda Marie Lawrence 104		Allison DeLong
Carleton South	Bruce Smith 2,462	Jerry Covey 2,036	Bill Hamilton 890	Arthur L. Slipp 254		Bruce Smith
York North	Bob Simpson 3,825	Gregory James Hargrove 5,463	Mark A. Moir 1,174	Chris Orenstein 450		Bob Simpson
York South	Al Lacey 4,754	Danny Cameron 5,607	Marven Grant 1,797	Rita Hurley 602		Al Lacey
Fredericton South	Russ King 4,584	Meryl Sarty 3,295	Jamie Henderson 2,575	Pauline MacKenzie 1,463	Henry John Marshall (Ind.) 136	Russ King
Fredericton North	Jim Wilson 3,864	Ed Allen 6,052	Donald H. Parent 1,810	Richard Stephen DeSaulniers 553		Jim Wilson
Sunbury	Shawn Perry 2,616	Max White 3,935	Keith Ashfield 799	Barbara Ann Fairley 306		Doug Harrison†
Oromocto	Tom Gilbert 2,036	Albert Rector 2,197	Joe Mombourquette 939	Alton Shears 297		Tom Gilbert
Southwest Miramichi	Claude Stewart 2,798	Brent Taylor 2,954	Donald Long 701	Larry Lynch 193		Morris Green†
Miramichi-Newcastle	John McKay 2,583	**Arch Pafford** 2,252	Paul Dawson 2,573	Liane Tiboudeau-Doucet 315		John McKay
Chatham	**Frank McKenna** 3,147	Jim West 1,563	Richard Hilchey 598	Wera Baldwin 383		Frank McKenna
Bay du Vin	Reg MacDonald 2,834	John J. Keating 604	Muriel Lamkey 1,608	Jeanne Thériault 220		Reg MacDonald
Miramichi Bay	Danny Gay 3,940	James Grant MacIntosh 638	Emilien LeBreton 2,117	Norman A. Richardson 493		Danny Gay

==== South West ====
Consisting of Queens, Kings, Saint John and Charlotte county ridings.

Electoral district	Candidates					Incumbent
Electoral district	Liberal	CoR	PC	NDP	Other	Incumbent
Queens North	Doug Tyler 1,740	Constance Melissa Webber 1,654	Clayton Chase 256	Susan Barton 94		Doug Tyler
Queens South	Vaughn Blaney 1,543	Jarvis M. Ducey 1,205	Larry C. Black 676	Gordon Black 255		Vaughn Blaney
Kings West	Laureen Jarrett 6,219	Glendon F. Jones 3,810	Nancy E. Grant 3,267	Roger M. Olmstead 1,494		Laureen Jarrett
Kings Centre	Georgie Day 3,011	Colby Fraser 2,882	Charles Edward Murray 2,371	Marian Jefferies 1,133		Kal Seaman†
Kings East	Tim Wilson 2,843	Mel Stockford 2,098	Hazen Myers 2,871	Anne-Marie Dupuis 617		Pete Dalton†
Saint John Fundy	Stuart Jamieson 2,213	Gary William Vincent 1,868	Bev Harrison 2,033	Kathleen Fudge 907		Stuart Jamieson
East Saint John	George J. Jenkins 2,785	Gary Ewart 2,650	Don Elliott 1,360	Ben Donaldson 1,868		Peter Trites†
Saint John Harbour	Louis Murphy 1,779	Marie Gerrior 844	Nargis Kheraj 496	Al Maund 968		Louis Murphy
Saint John South	John Mooney 1,596	Ray McDevitt 549	Paddy Addison 514	**Elizabeth Weir** 1,675		John Mooney
Saint John Park	Shirley Dysart 1,743	Richard Condon Sullivan Kinsella 825	Shirley McAlary 733	Judith Meinert 777		Shirley Dysart
Saint John North	Leo McAdam 1,892	Peter A. Whitebone 950	Doug Shippee 1,089	Julie Galbraith 966		Leo McAdam
Saint John West	Jane Barry 3,527	Jim Webb 2,471	Gerry Maher 1,559	Robert W. Hickes 1,382		Jane Barry
Charlotte-Fundy	Eric Allaby 1,950	Keith B. Guptilt 957	Sharon Tucker 757	Dorothy Matthews 183		Eric Allaby
Charlotte Centre	Sheldon Lee 2,195	Connie M. Stewart 516	Stanley John Smith 471	Jean Stewart 162		Sheldon Lee
Charlotte West	Reid Hurley 1,796	Mabel Groom 768	Bev Lawrence 1,077	Ellen Smith 281		Reid Hurley
St. Stephen-Milltown	Ann Breault 1,820	Robert Michael Booth 798	Ken Stevens 1,129	Irene Tobin 114		Ann Breault

==== South East ====
Consisting of Kent, Westmorland and Albert county ridings.

Electoral district	Candidates					Incumbent
Electoral district	Liberal	CoR	PC	NDP	Other	Incumbent
Kent North	Conrad Landry 3,377		Dominique Babineau 939	Docile Doiron 1,011		Conrad Landry
Kent Centre	Alan Graham 3,025	Percy Beers 626	David MacDonald 347	Neil Gardner 379		Alan Graham
Kent South	Camille Thériault 5,573		Jean-Claude Cormier 2,023	Gérald Mazerolle 1,256		Camille Thériault
Shediac	Bernard Richard 7,298	Lester Russell Hyslop 481	Emile Goguen Dupré 1,240	Patrick Allain 830		Azor LeBlanc†
Tantramar	Marilyn Trenholme 3,008	Clarke Edgar Sheppard 1,091	William R. Campbell 556	Robert Hall 1,419		Marilyn Trenholme
Memramcook	Greg O'Donnell 6,393	Julia Elnora LeBlanc 407	Jean-Robert Gaudet 680	Martin Aubin 1,797		Greg O'Donnell
Moncton East	J. Raymond Frenette 4,041	William André Joseph LeSage 1,120	John Hansen 1,026	Mary Elizabeth McLaughlin 1,416		Ray Frenette
Moncton North	Mike McKee 4,797	Tom Taylor 1,780	John MacFarlane 1,262	J.C. Bourque 973		Mike McKee
Moncton West	Jim Lockyer 3,558	Arthur M. Hayden 1,691	Ben D. Stymiest 1,483	Stephanie Day Domingue 726		Jim Lockyer
Petitcodiac	Hollis S. Steeves 4,698	Leona May Geldart 4,786	**Dennis Cochrane** 4,879	Richard Hay 1,204		Hollis Steeves
Riverview	Hubert Seamans 3,115	Gordon B. Willden 3,139	Ross MacCallum 2,084	Wayne Brown 594		Hubert Seamans
Albert	Lee Martin 1,432	Beverly M. Brine 2,328	Wayne Steeves 1,641	Elizabeth Venart 277		Harold Terris†
