= 1994 New Brunswick electoral redistribution =

The 1992-1994 New Brunswick electoral redistribution was the first re-alignment of electoral districts in New Brunswick, Canada, since 1973. Under this redistribution, several districts were changed significantly due to considerable population shifts from the northern part of the province to the south. The total number of districts was reduced from 58 to 55. Due to considerable population shifts over the course of two decades, some ridings were merged, while others were split in two, and some were unchanged.

The draft recommendations of new districts was created by a royal commission appointed by Premier Frank McKenna in late 1991, which completed its report in 1993. The report was then referred to the provincial legislature which made changes, including the addition of a district and several boundary and name changes. The changes to districts were proclaimed into law in 1994.

== Largely unchanged districts ==
1994 district	Changes from 1973
Albert	Added a small portion of the town of Riverview
Bathurst	unchanged
Campbellton	Added a small portion of the old Dalhousie district
Caraquet	Lost territory to the new Centre-Péninsule district
Dieppe-Memramcook	Renamed from Memramcook to reflect the growth of Dieppe which is with its boundaries; lost small amount of territory to Tantramar while gaining approximately equal amount from Petitcodiac
Edmundston	Adds small portion of the old Madawaska Centre district
Fredericton North	territory east of the Nashwaak River ceded to Fredericton-Fort Nashwaak
Fredericton South	Added large portion of old York South district while losing a small amount of territory to the new Fredericton-Fort Nashwaak district
Grand Falls Region	The old Grand Falls district + small portions of Madawaska County
Kent South	Loses small amount of territory to the new Kent district while gaining an approximately equal amount from both Petitcodiac and the old Shediac district
Kings East	Loses territory to Petitcodiac
Lamèque-Shippagan-Miscou	The old district Shippagan-les-Isles loses some territory to the new Centre-Péninsule district and is renamed to reflect all of the large communities in the riding
Mactaquac	The old York North district less some small amounts of territory, renamed to reflect the fact that the community within the riding has adopted the name "Mactaquac" based on its proximity to the Mactaquac Dam
Madawaska-les-Lacs	Gained small amounts of Madawaska Centre
Miramichi Bay	unchanged
Miramichi Centre	The old district of Miramichi-Newcastle, renamed to reflect the merger of Newcastle into the new city of Miramichi
Moncton East	Added small parts from neighbouring ridings while losing a small part to the new Moncton South district
Moncton North	unchanged
Moncton South	Most of the old Moncton West with small parts from Moncton East
Nepisiguit	Old district of Nepisiguit-Chaleur less small amounts of territory ceded to Nigadoo-Chaleur along the Bay of Chaleur plus equal parts of Nigadoo-Chaleur
Nigadoo-Chaleur	Small amounts of territory added from Nepisiguit-Chaleur and Restigouche East; while some territory shifts to the new Nepisiguit district
Oromocto-Gagetown	Renamed from Oromocto to reflect the importance of CFB Gagetown and added small amounts of territory from Queens South
Petitcodiac	Loses that part of the city of Moncton that had been in its boundaries and gains small portions of Kings East
Restigouche West	unchanged save those (unpopulated) parts of Mount Carleton Provincial Park that were not in its boundaries
Riverview	Cedes a small portion of territory to Albert
Saint John Champlain	The old district of East Saint John plus small parts of Saint John Park and Saint John-Fundy; renamed to reflect the new naming scheme used for Saint John districts
Saint John Lancaster	Most of the old district of Saint John West with small parts of the old Saint John Harbour
Saint John-Fundy	Lost small amounts of territory to Saint John-Kings and Saint John Champlain
Shediac-Cap-Pelé	Renamed to reflect that the riding encompasses much more than just the town of Shediac while losing some territory to Kent South
Southwest Miramichi	Gained small amounts of territory from York North and Bay du Vin
Tantramar	Essentially unchanged added one poll each from two neighbouring ridings
Tracadie-Sheila	Renamed to reflect the amalgamation of Tracadie and Sheila; lost some territory to the new Centre-Péninsule district
Victoria-Tobique	unchanged
Woodstock	The old Carleton South district plus parts of Carleton Centre and York South.
York	Those parts of York South not shifted to other districts with small parts of York North

== Merged districts ==
1994 district	Created from
Carleton	Merger of all of Carleton North and most of Carleton Centre some of which went to Woodstock
Charlotte	Created from a merger of most of Charlotte Centre and the mainland from Charlotte-Fundy with small parts of Saint John West
Dalhousie-Restigouche East	Full merger of Dalhousie and Restigouche East save for a few polls from each that went to adjacent ridings
Kent	All of Kent Centre merge with most of Kent North and portions of Kent South
Madawaska-la-Vallée	Merger of Madawaska Centre and Madawaska South save for small parts ceded to other districts
Miramichi-Bay du Vin	Merger of Chatham and approximately half of Bay du Vin
Saint John Harbour	Merger of the old Saint John Harbour riding and the Saint John South riding; the name is a misnomer in that half of the old district of Saint John Harbour went to the new district of Saint John Lancaster while this includes the whole of the old Saint John South riding
Saint John Portland	Merger of Saint John North and most of Saint John Park
Western Charlotte	Merger of St. Stephen-Milltown and Charlotte West save for the island of Campobello which goes to the new district Fundy Isles

== New districts ==
New district	Boundary explanation
Centre-Péninsule	Created from pieces of Caraquet, Shippagan-les-Îles, Tracadie and Nepisiguit-Chaleur
Fredericton-Fort Nashwaak	Created from parts of Fredericton North and Fredericton South
Fundy Isles	This new riding, far smaller than the provincial average in population, consists of the three populated islands of the Bay of Fundy taking one each from old Charlotte County districts
Grand Bay-Westfield	Created from parts of Kings Centre, Queens South and Saint John West in and around the town of Grand Bay-Westfield
Grand Lake	Created from all of the riding of Queens North plus parts of Sunbury and Queens South
Hampton-Belleisle	Created from parts of Kings Centre and Kings West
Kennebecasis	The old Kings West riding less territory moved to Hampton-Belleisle and to Saint John-Kings and renamed to a more specific and commonly understood name
Moncton Crescent	Created from most of the Petitcodiac riding that was within and around the city of Moncton plus several polls from neighbouring ridings
New Maryland	Created from large parts of Sunbury and York South with small parts of Queens South and Charlotte-Fundy
Rogersville-Kouchibouguac	Created from parts of Kent North and Bay du Vin
Saint John-Kings	Created from much of Kings West and small parts of the city of Saint John from the districts of Saint John-Fundy and East Saint John

Preceded by 1973	New Brunswick electoral redistributions	Succeeded by 2006
