= Saint John East (electoral district, 1967–1974) =

Defunct provincial electoral district in New Brunswick, Canada

New Brunswick electoral district

Defunct provincial electoral district
- Legislature: Legislative Assembly of New Brunswick
- District created: 1967
- District abolished: 1973
- First contested: 1967
- Last contested: 1970

Saint John East was a provincial electoral district for the Legislative Assembly of New Brunswick, Canada. It utilized a bloc voting system to elect candidates and was created from Saint John County in 1967. The district was abolished with the 1973 electoral redistribution, when the province moved to single-member ridings.

== Members of the Legislative Assembly ==
Legislature	Years	Member	Party	Member	Party
Riding created from Saint John County
46th	1967 – 1970	Charles A. McIlveen	Progressive Conservative	William J. Woodroffe	Progressive Conservative
47th	1970 – 1972	Charles A. McIlveen	Progressive Conservative	William J. Woodroffe	Progressive Conservative
47th	1972 – 1974	Gerald Merrithew	Progressive Conservative	William J. Woodroffe	Progressive Conservative
Riding dissolved into East Saint John and Saint John-Fundy

== Election results ==
New Brunswick provincial by-election, 11 December 1972
Party	Candidate	Votes	Elected
Progressive Conservative	Gerry S. Merrithew	3,408	✓
Liberal	Gordie M. Foster	2,825	
New Democratic	Eldon Richardson, Jr.	275	

1970 New Brunswick general election
Party	Candidate	Votes	Elected
Progressive Conservative	Charles A. McIlveen	5,332	✓
Progressive Conservative	William J. Woodroffe	5,200	✓
Liberal	Fred Cave	3,102	
Liberal	Michael B. McGrath	2,863	
New Democratic	Lindsay F. Sabean	579	
New Democratic	Alphonse Hébert	565	

1967 New Brunswick general election
Party	Candidate	Votes	Elected
Progressive Conservative	Charles A. McIlveen	5,052	✓
Progressive Conservative	William J. Woodroffe	5,033	✓
Liberal	Fred Cave	3,541	
Liberal	Paul E. Mackin	3,388	

== See also ==
- List of New Brunswick provincial electoral districts
- Canadian provincial electoral districts
