= Kings West (New Brunswick electoral district) =

Defunct provincial electoral district in New Brunswick, Canada

New Brunswick electoral district
- Coordinates: 45.461°N 65.887°W

Defunct provincial electoral district
- Legislature: Legislative Assembly of New Brunswick
- District created: 1973
- District abolished: 1994
- First contested: 1974
- Last contested: 1991

Demographics
- Electors (1991): 19,681
- Census division: Kings County

Kings West was a provincial electoral district for the Legislative Assembly of New Brunswick, Canada. The riding consisted of the towns of Hampton, Rothesay and Quispamsis, and their surroundings.

The district was created in 1973, when the multi-member district Kings was subdivided into Kings Centre, Kings East and Kings West. In 1994, it was split again to create the districts of Hampton-Belleisle, Kennebecasis, and Saint John-Kings.

== Members of the Legislative Assembly ==
Kings West
Assembly	Years	Member	Party
Riding created from Kings
48th	1974–1978	John B. M. Baxter, Jr.	Progressive Conservative
49th	1978–1982	John B. M. Baxter, Jr.	Progressive Conservative
50th	1982–1987	John B. M. Baxter, Jr.	Progressive Conservative
51st	1987–1991	Laureen Jarrett	Liberal
52nd	1991–1995	Laureen Jarrett	Liberal
Riding dissolved into Kennebecasis, Saint John-Kings and Hampton-Belleisle

== Election results ==
1991 New Brunswick general election
Party	Candidate	Votes	%	±%
Liberal	Laureen Jarrett	6,219	42.05	-6.19
Confederation of Regions	Glendon F. Jones	3,810	25.76	–
Progressive Conservative	Dr. Nancy E. Grant	3,267	22.09	+1.90
New Democratic	Roger M. Olmstead	1,494	10.10	-21.48
Total valid votes		14,790	100.0	
Liberal hold		Swing		-15.98

1987 New Brunswick general election
Party	Candidate	Votes	%	±%
Liberal	Laureen Jarrett	6,717	48.24	+20.20
New Democratic	George Little	4,397	31.58	+5.15
Progressive Conservative	Don Horne	2,811	20.19	-25.34
Total valid votes		13,925	100.0	
Liberal gain from Progressive Conservative		Swing		+7.52

1982 New Brunswick general election
Party	Candidate	Votes	%	±%
Progressive Conservative	John B. M. Baxter	5,226	45.53	-3.81
Liberal	Malcolm A. Barry	3,219	28.04	-8.82
New Democratic	George Little	3,034	26.43	+12.63
Total valid votes		11,479	100.0	
Progressive Conservative hold		Swing		+2.50

1978 New Brunswick general election
Party	Candidate	Votes	%	±%
Progressive Conservative	John B. M. Baxter	4,047	49.34	+0.33
Liberal	Jack Stevens	3,023	36.86	-8.25
New Democratic	George Little	1,132	13.80	+7.92
Total valid votes		8,202	100.0	
Progressive Conservative hold		Swing		+4.29

1974 New Brunswick general election
Party	Candidate	Votes	%
Progressive Conservative	John B. M. Baxter	3,328	49.01
Liberal	Jack J. E. Stevens	3,063	45.11
New Democratic	Robert Hatfield	399	5.88
Total valid votes		6,790	100.0
The previous multi-member riding of Kings went totally Progressive Conservative in the last election. John B. M. Baxter, Jr. was one of three incumbents from Kings.

== See also ==
- List of New Brunswick provincial electoral districts
- Canadian provincial electoral districts
