= Rodney Weston =

Canadian businessman and politician

Rodney H. Weston

Member of Parliament for Saint John
- In office October 14, 2008 – August 4, 2015
- Preceded by: Paul Zed
- Succeeded by: Wayne Long

Member of the New Brunswick Legislative Assembly for Saint John-Fundy
- In office 1999–2003
- Preceded by: Stuart Jamieson
- Succeeded by: Stuart Jamieson

Chairman of the Standing Committee on Fisheries and Oceans
- In office February 3, 2009 – August 4, 2015
- Preceded by: Fabian Manning
- Succeeded by: Scott Simms

Personal details
- Born: March 28, 1964 (age 62) Saint John, New Brunswick
- Party: Conservative
- Spouse: Dawn Connolly
- Profession: Small business owner/operator

Rodney H. Weston (born March 28, 1964) is a businessman and politician in New Brunswick, Canada. He represented the Saint John electoral district as a Member of Parliament from 2008 until 2015.

== Biography ==
Weston was born in Saint John, New Brunswick, the son of Lester and Phyllis Weston. He was a post-secondary student at New Brunswick Community College.

Weston owned and operated a gas station and also was a trucking contractor as well as chief of the St. Martins Volunteer Fire Department.

Weston entered public life in his service as deputy mayor for St. Martins.

Weston ran to represent the riding of Saint John-Fundy in the Legislative Assembly of New Brunswick as a Progressive Conservative member in the 1995 New Brunswick general election, coming second to Liberal incumbent Stuart Jamieson. He defeated Jamieson in 1999 and was Minister of Agriculture, Fisheries & Aquaculture from 2001 to 2003. In 2003, Jamieson defeated Weston when he ran for re-election. After the election, the province's premier, Bernard Lord, hired him as his chief of staff.

In his first foray into federal politics, in 2008, Weston was elected as Conservative MP for the electoral district of Saint John, defeating incumbent Liberal Paul Zed. He was re-elected in 2011 but did not hold his seat, in the now renamed Saint John—Rothesay, when at the 2015 Canadian federal election the Liberal Party of Canada won every seat east of Quebec. Weston personally lost to challenger Wayne Long, a business figure in Saint John.

Weston ran in Saint John—Rothesay again in 2019 but was not elected, coming second behind Long.

== Electoral record ==
=== Federal ===
2019 Canadian federal election: Saint John—Rothesay
Party	Candidate	Votes	%	±%	Expenditures
Liberal	Wayne Long	15,443	37.43	-11.37	$65,376.07
Conservative	Rodney Weston	14,006	33.95	+3.41	$98,624.09
New Democratic	Armand Cormier	5,046	12.23	-5.30	$2,746.93
Green	Ann McAllister	4,165	10.10	+6.97	none listed
People's	Adam J. C. Salesse	1,260	3.05		none listed
Independent	Stuart Jamieson	1,183	2.87		$6,611.27
Independent	Neville Barnett	150	0.36		$170.00
Total valid votes/expense limit		41,253	99.40		
Total rejected ballots		250	0.60	+0.12	
Turnout		41,503	65.18	-3.65	
Eligible voters		63,677			
Liberal hold		Swing		-7.39	
Source: Elections Canada

2015 Canadian federal election: Saint John—Rothesay
Party	Candidate	Votes	%	±%	Expenditures
Liberal	Wayne Long	20,634	48.80	+32.81	–
Conservative	Rodney Weston	12,915	30.54	-19.18	–
New Democratic	AJ Griffin	7,411	17.53	-13.2	–
Green	Sharon Murphy	1,321	3.12	+0.35	–
Total valid votes/expense limit		42,281	100.0		$196,334.01
Total rejected ballots		205	–	–	
Turnout		42,486	69.38	–	
Eligible voters		61,236			
Source: Elections Canada

2011 Canadian federal election: Saint John—Rothesay
Party	Candidate	Votes	%	±%	Expenditures
Conservative	Rodney Weston	18,456	49.73	+10.18	$79,348.63
New Democratic	Rob Moir	11,382	30.67	+14.71	$23,584.68
Liberal	Stephen Chase	5,964	16.07	-22.06	$42,496.31
Green	Sharon Murphy-Flatt	1,017	2.74	-2.68	$2,700.77
Independent	Arthur Watson Jr.	294	0.79	–	$251.37
Total valid votes/expense limit		37,113	100.0		$82,011.29
Total rejected, unmarked and declined ballots		176	0.47		
Turnout		37,289	58.02	+4.01	
Eligible voters		64,264			
Conservative hold		Swing		-2.26	

2008 Canadian federal election: Saint John—Rothesay
Party	Candidate	Votes	%	±%	Expenditures
Conservative	Rodney Weston	13,782	39.55	+0.25	$73,497.84
Liberal	Paul Zed	13,285	38.13	-4.79	$69,234.99
New Democratic	Tony Mowery	5,560	15.96	+0.32	$2,720.91
Green	Mike Richardson	1,888	5.42	+3.28	$1,008.49
Marijuana	Michael Moffat	330	0.95	–	none listed
Total valid votes/expense limit		34,845	100.0		$79,702
Total rejected, unmarked and declined ballots		187	0.53	±0	
Turnout		35,032	54.01	-7.38	
Eligible voters		64,868			
Conservative gain from Liberal		Swing		+2.52	

=== Provincial ===
2003 New Brunswick general election: Saint John-Fundy
Party	Candidate	Votes	%	±%
Liberal	Stuart Jamieson	2,698	47.68	+15.54
Progressive Conservative	Rodney Weston	2,271	40.14	-17.60
New Democratic	Liam Freill	517	9.14	+0.93
Grey	Marjorie MacMurray	172	3.04	–
Total valid votes		5,658	100.0	
Liberal gain from Progressive Conservative		Swing		+16.57

1999 New Brunswick general election: Saint John-Fundy
Party	Candidate	Votes	%	±%
Progressive Conservative	Rodney Weston	3,473	57.74	+19.71
Liberal	Stuart Jamieson	1,933	32.14	-8.98
New Democratic	Robert E. Holmes-Lauder	494	8.21	-8.06
Confederation of Regions	David Lytle	115	1.91	-1.85
Total valid votes		6,015	100.0	
Progressive Conservative gain from Liberal		Swing		+14.34

1995 New Brunswick general election: Saint John-Fundy
Party	Candidate	Votes	%	±%
Liberal	Stuart Jamieson	2,447	41.12	+9.60
Progressive Conservative	Rodney Weston	2,263	38.03	+9.07
New Democratic	Aubrey Fougere	968	16.27	+3.35
Confederation of Regions	Bernard Toole	224	3.76	-22.85
Natural Law	Phyllis Johnston	49	0.82	–
Total valid votes		5,951	100.0	
Liberal hold		Swing		+0.26

New Brunswick provincial government of Bernard Lord
Cabinet post (1)
Predecessor	Office	Successor
Paul Robichaud	Minister of Agriculture, Fisheries & Aquaculture; 2001–2003	David Alward
