= Restigouche East =

Provincial electoral district in New Brunswick, Canada

New Brunswick electoral district
- The riding of Restigouche East (as it exists from 2023) in relation to other New Brunswick electoral districts

Provincial electoral district
- Legislature: Legislative Assembly of New Brunswick
MLA
Guy Arseneault
Liberal
- District created: 2023
- First contested: 2024

Restigouche East (French: Restigouche-Est) is a provincial electoral district in New Brunswick, Canada. It was created from the multi-member district of Restigouche in the 1973 electoral redistribution, and abolished in the 1994 electoral redistribution.

Following the 2023 redistribution, the riding was re-created from parts of Campbellton-Dalhousie, Restigouche West, Restigouche-Chaleur and Bathurst West-Beresford.

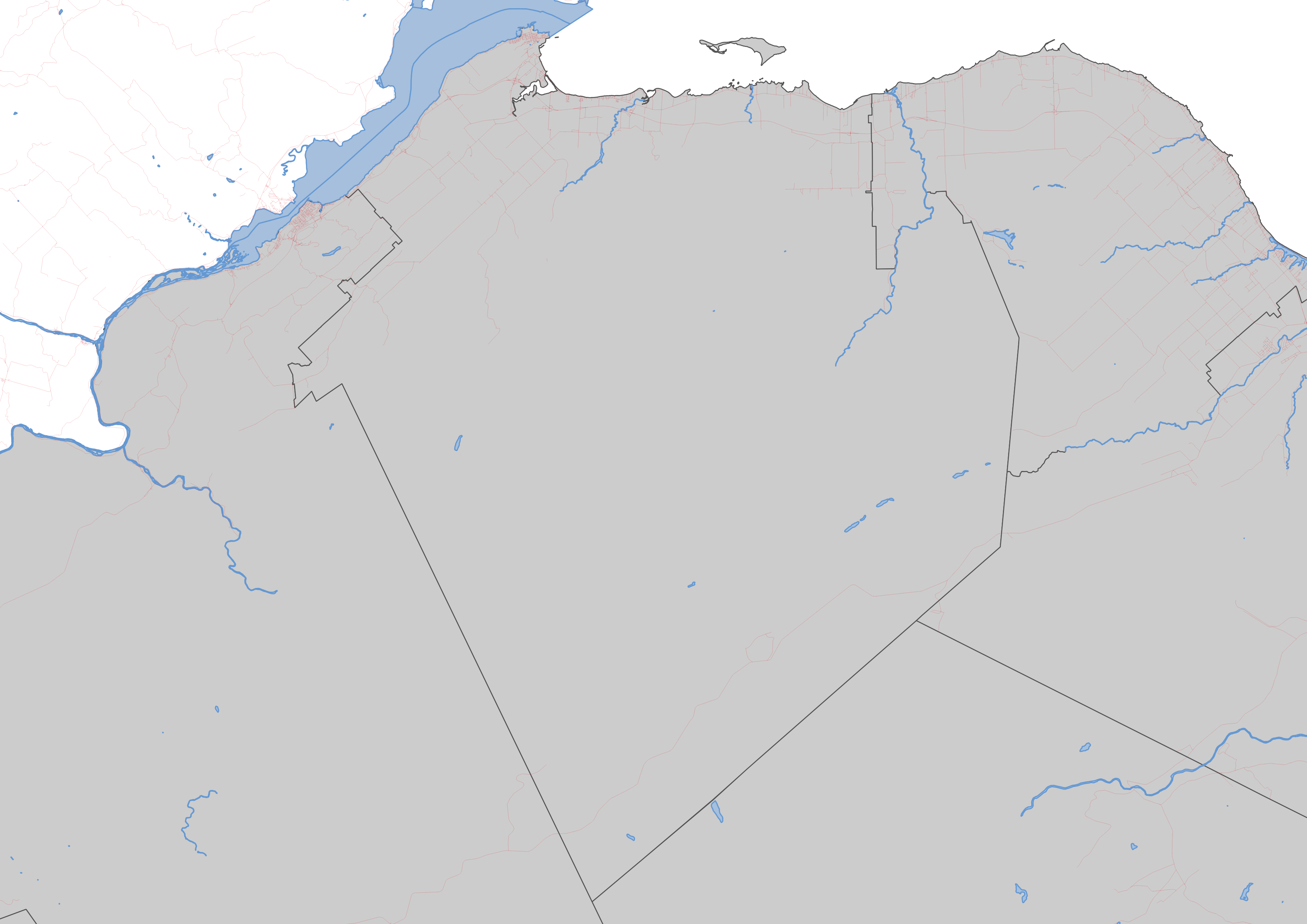
Restigouche East (as it exists from 2023) and the roads in the riding

== Members of the Legislative Assembly ==
Assembly	Years	Member	Party
Riding created from Restigouche
48th	1974–1978	Rayburn Doucett	Liberal
49th	1978–1982	Rayburn Doucett	Liberal
50th	1982–1987	Rayburn Doucett	Liberal
51st	1987–1991	Rayburn Doucett	Liberal
52nd	1991–1995	Rayburn Doucett	Liberal
Riding dissolved into Dalhousie-Restigouche East
Riding re-created from Campbellton-Dalhousie, Restigouche West, Restigouche-Chaleur and Bathurst West-Beresford
61st	2024–Present	Guy Arseneault	Liberal

Restigouche East
New Brunswick electoral district

Defunct provincial electoral district
- Legislature: Legislative Assembly of New Brunswick
- District created: 1973
- District abolished: 1994
- First contested: 1974
- Last contested: 1991

== Election results ==
2024 New Brunswick general election
Party	Candidate	Votes	%	±%
Liberal	Guy Arseneault	3,590	53.2%	-13.7
Progressive Conservative	Normand Pelletier	2,271	33.6%	+16.7
New Democratic	Daisy Petersen	501	7.4%	
Green	Gilles Cormier	389	5.8%	-10.1
Total valid votes		6,751		
Total rejected ballots				
Turnout				
Eligible voters				
Liberal hold		Swing		
Source: Elections New Brunswick

2020 provincial election redistributed results
Party	%
Liberal	66.9
Progressive Conservative	16.9
Green	15.9

1991 New Brunswick general election
Party	Candidate	Votes	%	±%
Liberal	Rayburn Doucett	3,023	61.21	-4.19
New Democratic	Walter Gauthier, Jr.	1,241	25.13	+21.46
Confederation of Regions	Norman Shea	381	7.71	–
Progressive Conservative	Richard Lapointe	294	5.95	-24.97
Total valid votes		4,939	100.0	
Liberal hold		Swing		-12.82

1987 New Brunswick general election
Party	Candidate	Votes	%	±%
Liberal	Rayburn Doucett	3,382	65.40	+16.42
Progressive Conservative	Paul E. McIntyre	1,599	30.92	-9.83
New Democratic	Wayne Lapointe	190	3.67	-6.60
Total valid votes		5,171	100.0	
Liberal hold		Swing		+13.12

1982 New Brunswick general election
Party	Candidate	Votes	%	±%
Liberal	Rayburn Donald Doucett	2,418	48.98	+0.10
Progressive Conservative	Aurèle Desrosiers	2,012	40.75	+7.07
New Democratic	Wayne Lapointe	507	10.27	-1.96
Total valid votes		4,937	100.0	
Liberal hold		Swing		-3.48

1978 New Brunswick general election
Party	Candidate	Votes	%	±%
Liberal	Rayburn Donald Doucett	2,035	48.88	-14.77
Progressive Conservative	Guy Laviolette	1,402	33.68	+2.44
New Democratic	Gail Walsh	509	12.23	+7.12
Parti acadien	Roland Godin	217	5.21	–
Total valid votes		4,163	100.0	
Liberal hold		Swing		-8.60

1974 New Brunswick general election
Party	Candidate	Votes	%
Liberal	Rayburn Donald Doucett	2,292	63.65
Progressive Conservative	Harmon Leigh McCormick	1,125	31.24
New Democratic	Dorothy Ravenscroft	184	5.11
Total valid votes		3,601	100.0
The previous multi-member riding of Restigouche went totally Liberal in the previous election, with Rayburn Doucett being one of three incumbents.

== See also ==
- List of New Brunswick provincial electoral districts
- Canadian provincial electoral districts
