= Queens North =

Defunct provincial electoral district in New Brunswick, Canada

New Brunswick electoral district

Defunct provincial electoral district
- Legislature: Legislative Assembly of New Brunswick
- District created: 1973
- District abolished: 1994
- First contested: 1974
- Last contested: 1991

Queens North was a provincial electoral district in New Brunswick, Canada. It was created from the multi-member riding of Queens in the 1973 electoral redistribution, and was abolished in the 1994 electoral redistribution.

== Members of the Legislative Assembly ==
Assembly	Years	Member	Party
Riding created from Queens
48th	1974–1978	Wilfred Bishop	Progressive Conservative
49th	1978–1982	Wilfred Bishop	Progressive Conservative
50th	1982–1987	Wilfred Bishop	Progressive Conservative
51st	1987–1991	Doug Tyler	Liberal
52nd	1991–1995	Doug Tyler	Liberal
Riding dissolved into Grand Lake

== Election results ==
1991 New Brunswick general election
Party	Candidate	Votes	%	±%
Liberal	Doug Tyler	1,740	46.47	-11.91
Confederation of Regions	Constance Melissa Webber	1,654	44.18	–
Progressive Conservative	Clayton Chase	256	6.84	-31.22
New Democratic	Susan Barton	94	2.51	-1.05
Total valid votes		3,744	100.0	
Liberal hold		Swing		-28.04
Confederation of Regions candidate Constance Webber gained 6.12 percentage points from her performance in 1987 running as a Progressive Conservative.

1987 New Brunswick general election
Party	Candidate	Votes	%	±%
Liberal	Doug Tyler	2,212	58.38	+20.87
Progressive Conservative	Constance M. Webber	1,442	38.06	-15.83
New Democratic	Ruth Nightingale	135	3.56	-2.42
Total valid votes		3,789	100.0	
Liberal gain from Progressive Conservative		Swing		+18.35

1982 New Brunswick general election
Party	Candidate	Votes	%	±%
Progressive Conservative	Wilfred G. Bishop	1,911	53.89	-10.37
Liberal	Cyril MacDonald	1,330	37.51	+1.77
New Democratic	Frank Wuhr	212	5.98	–
Independent	William Taylor	93	2.62	–
Total valid votes		3,546	100.0	
Progressive Conservative hold		Swing		-6.07

1978 New Brunswick general election
Party	Candidate	Votes	%	±%
Progressive Conservative	Wilfred George Bishop	2,059	64.26	+2.65
Liberal	Eva Andries	1,145	35.74	-2.65
Total valid votes		3,204	100.0	
Progressive Conservative hold		Swing		+2.65

1974 New Brunswick general election
Party	Candidate	Votes	%
Progressive Conservative	Wilfred G. Bishop	1,961	61.61
Liberal	Mike Jardine	1,222	38.39
Total valid votes		3,183	100.0
The previous multi-member riding of Queens elected one Progressive Conservative and one Liberal in the previous election. Wilfred Bishop was one of two incumbents.

== See also ==
- List of New Brunswick provincial electoral districts
- Canadian provincial electoral districts
