= Chatham (electoral district) =

Defunct provincial electoral district in New Brunswick, Canada

Coordinates: 47.0235°N 65.4484°W

New Brunswick electoral district

Defunct provincial electoral district
- Legislature: Legislative Assembly of New Brunswick
- District created: 1973
- District abolished: 1994
- First contested: 1974
- Last contested: 1991

Chatham was a provincial electoral district New Brunswick, Canada. It was created from the multi-member riding of Northumberland in the 1973 electoral redistribution, and was abolished in the 1994 electoral redistribution.

== Members of the Legislative Assembly ==
Assembly	Years	Member	Party
Riding created from Northumberland
48th	1974–1978	Frank Kane	Liberal
49th	1978–1982	Frank Kane	Liberal
50th	1982–1987	Frank McKenna	Liberal
51st	1987–1991	Frank McKenna	Liberal
52nd	1991–1995	Frank McKenna	Liberal
Riding dissolved into Miramichi-Bay du Vin

== Election results ==
1991 New Brunswick general election
Party	Candidate	Votes	%	±%
Liberal	Frank McKenna	3,147	55.30	-22.97
Confederation of Regions	Jim West	1,563	27.46	–
Progressive Conservative	Richard Hilchey	598	10.51	-7.05
New Democratic	Wera Baldwin	383	6.73	+2.56
Total valid votes		5,691	100.0	
Liberal hold		Swing		-25.22

1987 New Brunswick general election
Party	Candidate	Votes	%	±%
Liberal	Frank McKenna	4,653	78.27	+33.04
Progressive Conservative	Leon Bremner	1,044	17.56	-26.27
New Democratic	Patricia Marie Clancy	248	4.17	-6.77
Total valid votes		5,945	100.0	
Liberal hold		Swing		+29.66

1982 New Brunswick general election
Party	Candidate	Votes	%	±%
Liberal	Frank McKenna	2,618	45.23	-9.68
Progressive Conservative	John J. Barry	2,537	43.83	+5.86
New Democratic	John T. McLaughlin	633	10.94	+3.81
Total valid votes		5,788	100.0	
Liberal hold		Swing		-7.77

1978 New Brunswick general election
Party	Candidate	Votes	%	±%
Liberal	Frank E. Kane	2,920	54.91	+5.80
Progressive Conservative	Greg Barry	2,019	37.97	-6.31
New Democratic	Lloyd Vienneau	379	7.13	+0.52
Total valid votes		5,318	100.0	
Liberal hold		Swing		+6.06

1974 New Brunswick general election
Party	Candidate	Votes	%
Liberal	Frank E. Kane	2,513	49.11
Progressive Conservative	Robert Martin	2,266	44.28
New Democratic	J.A. Richardson	338	6.61
Total valid votes		5,117	100.0
The previous multi-member riding of Northumberland went totally Liberal in the last election, with Frank Kane being one of five incumbents.

== See also ==
- List of New Brunswick provincial electoral districts
- Canadian provincial electoral districts
