= 49th New Brunswick Legislature =

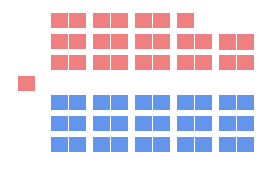
Rendition of party representation in the 49th New Brunswick Legislative Assembly following the 1978 election. Progressive Conservatives (30) Liberals (28)

The 49th New Brunswick Legislative Assembly was created following a general election in 1978. It was dissolved on September 1, 1982.

== Leadership ==
Robert McCready was chosen as speaker in 1979 even though he had been elected as a Liberal member. James Tucker succeeded McCready as speaker in 1981.

Premier Richard Hatfield led the government. The Progressive Conservative Party was the ruling party.

== List of Members ==
Electoral District	Name	Party	First elected / previously elected
Albert	Malcolm MacLeod	Progressive Conservative	1970
Bathurst	Paul Kenny	Liberal	1978
Bay du Vin	Norbert Thériault	Liberal	1960
Bay du Vin	Reginald MacDonald (1979)	Liberal	1979
Campbellton	Fernand G. Dubé	Progressive Conservative	1974
Caraquet	Onil Doiron	Liberal	1974
Carleton Centre	Richard Hatfield	Progressive Conservative	1961
Carleton North	Charles Gallagher	Progressive Conservative	1970
Carleton South	Paul Steven Porter	Progressive Conservative	1978
Charlotte Centre	Sheldon Lee	Liberal	1978
Charlotte-Fundy	James N. Tucker, Jr.	Progressive Conservative	1973
Charlotte West	Leland McGaw	Progressive Conservative	1967
Chatham	Frank E. Kane	Liberal	1969
Dalhousie	Allan E. Maher	Liberal	1978
Edmundston	Jean-Maurice Simard	Progressive Conservative	1970
Fredericton North	Edwin G. Allen	Progressive Conservative	1978
Fredericton South	J.W. Bird	Progressive Conservative	1978
Grand Falls	Everard Daigle	Liberal	1974
Kent Centre	Alan R. Graham	Liberal	1967
Kent North	Joseph Daigle	Liberal	1974
Kent South	Bertin LeBlanc	Liberal	1978
Kings Centre	Harold Fanjoy	Progressive Conservative	1974
Kings East	Hazen Myers	Progressive Conservative	1978
Kings West	John B.M. Baxter	Progressive Conservative	1962
Madawaska-Centre	Gérald Clavette	Liberal	1967
Madawaska-les-Lacs	Jean-Pierre Ouellet	Progressive Conservative	1974
Madawaska South	Héliodore Côté	Liberal	1978
Memramcook	William Malenfant	Liberal	1974
Miramichi Bay	Edgar LeGresley	Liberal	1970
Miramichi-Newcastle	John McKay	Liberal	1974
Southwest Miramichi	Morris Vernon Green	Liberal	1978
Moncton East	Raymond Frenette	Liberal	1974
Moncton North	Michael McKee	Liberal	1974
Moncton West	Mabel DeWare	Progressive Conservative	1978
Nepisiguit-Chaleur	Frank Branch	Liberal	1970
Nigadoo-Chaleur	Pierre Godin	Liberal	1978
Oromocto	LeRoy Washburn	Liberal	1974
Petitcodiac	Bill Harmer	Progressive Conservative	1974
Queens North	Wilfred Bishop	Progressive Conservative	1952
Queens South	Robert McCready	Liberal	1967, 1978
Queens South	Robert McCready	Independent	1967, 1978
Queens South	Robert McCready	Progressive Conservative	1967, 1978
Restigouche East	Rayburn Doucett	Liberal	1970
Restigouche West	Alfred Roussel	Liberal	1970
Riverview	Brenda Robertson	Progressive Conservative	1967
Saint John East	Gerald Merrithew	Progressive Conservative	1972
Saint John-Fundy	Bev Harrison	Progressive Conservative	1978
Saint John Harbour	Louis Murphy	Liberal	1978
Saint John North	Eric Kipping	Progressive Conservative	1978
Saint John Park	Shirley Dysart	Liberal	1974
Saint John South	Nancy Teed	Progressive Conservative	1978
Saint John West	Rodman Logan	Progressive Conservative	1963
St. Stephen-Milltown	William Cockburn	Progressive Conservative	1967
Shediac	Azor LeBlanc	Progressive Conservative	1974
Shippagan-les-Îles	Jean Gauvin	Progressive Conservative	1978
Sunbury	Horace Smith	Progressive Conservative	1970
Tantramar	Lloyd Folkins	Progressive Conservative	1974
Tracadie	Douglas Young	Liberal	1978
Victoria-Tobique	J. Douglas Moore	Progressive Conservative	1976
York North	David Bishop	Progressive Conservative	1974
York South	Les Hull	Progressive Conservative	1974

== See also ==
- 1978 New Brunswick general election
- Legislative Assembly of New Brunswick

Preceded by 48th Assembly	New Brunswick Legislative Assemblies; 1978–1982	Succeeded by 50th Assembly
