= 1967 New Brunswick electoral redistribution =

Redistribution of electoral boundaries

The 1967 New Brunswick electoral redistribution was the first redistribution of electoral district boundaries in the New Brunswick, Canada, since 1926, and the first change in number of members since 1946.

At the time, New Brunswick operated on electoral districts with fixed boundaries, and the number of members to which they were entitled varied based upon their respective population. From 1926 to 1967, each of the province's 15 counties was a district. The cities of Saint John and Moncton were districts in their own rights. These districts elected members using the bloc voting system.

Under this redistribution, all six of New Brunswick's cities became electoral districts, and Saint John County was split into two districts, creating a total of 22 ridings.

For the first time since 1946, this created several districts that returned only one member using the first past the post system.

== Electoral districts ==
- Albert: Albert County; two members
- Bathurst: City of Bathurst; one member
- Campbellton: City of Campbellton, Village of Atholville and the Village of Tide Head; one member
- Carleton: Carleton County; three members
- Charlotte: Charlotte County; four members
- Edmundston: City of Edmundston; one member
- Fredericton: City of Fredericton; two members
- Gloucester: Gloucester County less the City of Bathurst; five members
- Kent: Kent County; three members
- Kings: Kings County; three members
- Madawaska: Madawaska County less the City of Edmundston; three members
- Moncton: City of Moncton; three members
- Northumberland: Northumberland County; five members
- Queens: Queens County; two members
- Restigouche: Restigouche County less the riding of Campbellton; three members
- Saint John Centre: City of Saint John; four members
- Saint John East: Saint John County east of the Saint John River and outside of the City of Saint John; two members
- Saint John West: Saint John County west of the Saint John River and outside of the City of Saint John; one member
- Sunbury: Sunbury County; two members
- Victoria: Victoria County; two members
- Westmorland: Westmorland County less the City of Moncton; four members
- York: York County less the City of Fredericton; two members

| Preceded by 1946 | New Brunswick electoral redistributions | Succeeded by 1973 |
