= 50th New Brunswick Legislature =

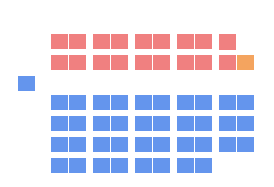
Rendition of party representation in the 50th New Brunswick Legislative Assembly following the 1982 election. Progressive Conservatives (39) Liberals (18) New Democrats (1)

The 50th New Brunswick Legislative Assembly was created following a general election in 1982. It was dissolved on August 29, 1987.

== Leadership ==
James Tucker was chosen as speaker in 1983. Charles Gallagher became speaker in 1985 after Tucker was named to a cabinet post.

Premier Richard Hatfield led the government. The Progressive Conservative Party was the ruling party.

== List of Members ==
Electoral District	Name	Party	First elected / previously elected
Albert	Malcolm MacLeod	Progressive Conservative	1970
Bathurst	Paul Kenny	Liberal	1978
Bay du Vin	Roger Wedge	Progressive Conservative	1982
Campbellton	Fernand G. Dubé	Progressive Conservative	1974
Caraquet	Emery Robichaud	Progressive Conservative	1982
Carleton Centre	Richard Hatfield	Progressive Conservative	1961
Carleton North	Charles Gallagher	Progressive Conservative	1970
Carleton South	Paul Steven Porter	Progressive Conservative	1978
Charlotte Centre	Sheldon Lee	Liberal	1978
Charlotte-Fundy	James N. Tucker, Jr.	Progressive Conservative	1973
Charlotte West	Leland McGaw	Progressive Conservative	1967
Chatham	Frank McKenna	Liberal	1982
Dalhousie	Allan E. Maher	Liberal	1978
Edmundston	Jean-Maurice Simard (Note: named to Senate)	Progressive Conservative	1970
Edmundston	Roland Beaulieu (1986)	Liberal	1986
Fredericton North	Edwin G. Allen	Progressive Conservative	1978
Fredericton South	David Clark	Progressive Conservative	1982
Grand Falls	Everard Daigle	Liberal	1974
Kent Centre	Alan R. Graham	Liberal	1967
Kent North	Conrad Landry	Liberal	1982
Kent South	Omer Léger	Progressive Conservative	1971, 1982
Kings Centre	Harold Fanjoy	Progressive Conservative	1974
Kings East	Hazen Myers	Progressive Conservative	1978
Kings West	John B.M. Baxter	Progressive Conservative	1962
Madawaska-Centre	Gérald Clavette (Note: resigned)	Liberal	1967
Madawaska-Centre	Donald Marmen (1984)	Progressive Conservative	1984
Madawaska-les-Lacs	Jean-Pierre Ouellet	Progressive Conservative	1974
Madawaska South	Percy Mockler	Progressive Conservative	1982
Memramcook	Clarence Cormier	Progressive Conservative	1982
Miramichi Bay	James Gordon	Progressive Conservative	1982
Miramichi-Newcastle	Paul Dawson	Progressive Conservative	1982
Southwest Miramichi	Morris Vernon Green	Liberal	1978
Moncton East	Raymond Frenette	Liberal	1974
Moncton North	Michael McKee	Liberal	1974
Moncton West	Mabel DeWare	Progressive Conservative	1978
Nepisiguit-Chaleur	Frank Branch	Liberal	1970
Nigadoo-Chaleur	Pierre Godin	Liberal	1978
Oromocto	Joe Mombourquette	Progressive Conservative	1982
Petitcodiac	Bill Harmer	Progressive Conservative	1974
Queens North	Wilfred Bishop	Progressive Conservative	1952
Queens South	Robert McCready	Progressive Conservative	1967, (Note: First elected as a Liberal) 1978 (Note: Re-elected as a Liberal)
Restigouche East	Rayburn Doucett	Liberal	1970
Restigouche West	Yvon Poitras	Progressive Conservative	1982
Riverview	Brenda Robertson	Progressive Conservative	1967
Riverview	Hubert Seamans (1985)	Liberal	1985
Saint John East	Gerald Merrithew	Progressive Conservative	1972
Saint John East	Peter Trites (1984)	New Democrat	1984
Saint John East	Peter Trites (1984)	Liberal	1984
Saint John-Fundy	Bev Harrison	Progressive Conservative	1978
Saint John Harbour	Louis Murphy	Liberal	1978
Saint John North	Eric Kipping	Progressive Conservative	1978
Saint John Park	Shirley Dysart	Liberal	1974
Saint John South	Nancy Teed	Progressive Conservative	1978
Saint John West	G. M. Keith Dow	Progressive Conservative	1982
St. Stephen-Milltown	Robert Jackson	Progressive Conservative	1982
Shediac	Azor LeBlanc	Liberal	1974
Shippagan-les-Îles	Jean Gauvin	Progressive Conservative	1978
Sunbury	Horace Smith	Progressive Conservative	1970
Tantramar	Robert Hall	New Democrat	1982
Tracadie	Douglas Young	Liberal	1978
Victoria-Tobique	J. Douglas Moore	Progressive Conservative	1976
York North	David Bishop	Progressive Conservative	1974
York South	Les Hull	Progressive Conservative	1974

== See also ==
- 1982 New Brunswick general election
- Legislative Assembly of New Brunswick

== Notes ==
Preceded by 49th Assembly	New Brunswick Legislative Assemblies; 1982–1987	Succeeded by 51st Assembly
