= Charles A. McIlveen =

Canadian politician (1910–1972)

Member of the Legislative Assembly of New Brunswick
- In office 1960–1972
- Constituency: Saint John County (1960–67); Saint John East (1967–72)

Personal details
- Born: March 9, 1910 Saint John, New Brunswick
- Died: June 26, 1972 (aged 62) Saint John, New Brunswick
- Party: Progressive Conservative Party of New Brunswick
- Spouse: Annie Jean Anthony
- Children: 4
- Occupation: manager

Charles Addy McIlveen (March 9, 1910 – July 26, 1972) was a Canadian politician. He served in the Legislative Assembly of New Brunswick from 1960 to 1972 as member of the Progressive Conservative party.
