= Fredericton (provincial electoral district) =

Defunct provincial electoral district in New Brunswick, Canada

New Brunswick electoral district

Defunct provincial electoral district
- Legislature: Legislative Assembly of New Brunswick
- District created: 1967
- District abolished: 1973
- First contested: 1967
- Last contested: 1970

Fredericton was a provincial electoral district in New Brunswick, Canada. It was separated from the riding of York from 1924 until it was absorbed back into York in 1926. The riding was recreated in 1967 and existed until 1973 when New Brunswick went from bloc voting to single-member ridings.

== Members of the Legislative Assembly ==
| Legislature | Years | Member | Party | Member | Party |
|---|---|---|---|---|---|
Riding created from York
| 36th | 1925 – 1930 | Charles D. Richards | Conservative | | |
Riding dissolved into York
Riding re-created from York
| 46th | 1967 – 1967 | George Everett Chalmers | Progressive Conservative | John F. McInerney | Progressive Conservative |
| 46th | 1968 – 1970 | George Everett Chalmers | Progressive Conservative | Lawrence Garvie | Progressive Conservative |
| 46th | 1970 – 1974 | George Everett Chalmers | Progressive Conservative | Lawrence Garvie | Progressive Conservative |
Riding dissolved into Fredericton North and Fredericton South

== Election results ==
=== 1967–1973 ===
1970 New Brunswick general election
| Party | Candidate | Votes | Elected |
|---|---|---|---|
| Progressive Conservative | G. Everett Chalmers | 11,249 | ✓ |
| Progressive Conservative | Lawrence Garvie | 10,459 | ✓ |
| Liberal | Edward N. Reynolds | 6,079 | |
| Liberal | William L. Hoyt | 5,829 | |
| New Democratic | Patrick Michael Callaghan | 723 | |
| New Democratic | Charles Joseph Khoury | 595 | |

New Brunswick provincial by-election, 10 June 1968
| Party | Candidate | Votes | Elected |
|---|---|---|---|
| Progressive Conservative | Lawrence Garvie | 8,240 | ✓ |
| Liberal | John Page | 5,305 | |

1967 New Brunswick general election
| Party | Candidate | Votes | Elected |
|---|---|---|---|
| Progressive Conservative | Dr. Everett Chalmers | 9,693 | ✓ |
| Progressive Conservative | Dr. J.F. McInerney | 9,145 | ✓ |
| Liberal | David Hughes | 6,988 | |
| Liberal | Daniel M. Hurley | 6,538 | |

== See also ==
- List of New Brunswick provincial electoral districts
- Canadian provincial electoral districts
