= Dalhousie (electoral district) =

Defunct provincial electoral district in New Brunswick, Canada

New Brunswick electoral district

Defunct provincial electoral district
- Legislature: Legislative Assembly of New Brunswick
- District created: 1973
- District abolished: 1994
- First contested: 1974
- Last contested: 1991

Dalhousie was a provincial electoral district in New Brunswick, Canada. It was created from the multi-member riding of Restigouche in the 1973 electoral redistribution, and abolished in the 1994 electoral redistribution.

== Members of the Legislative Assembly ==
Assembly	Years	Member	Party
Riding created from Restigouche
48th	1974–1978	John Potter	Progressive Conservative
49th	1978–1982	Allan Maher	Liberal
50th	1982–1987	Allan Maher	Liberal
51st	1987–1991	Allan Maher	Liberal
52nd	1991–1995	Allan Maher	Liberal
Riding dissolved into Dalhousie-Restigouche East and Campbellton

== Election results ==
1991 New Brunswick general election
Party	Candidate	Votes	%	±%
Liberal	Allan Maher	2,804	48.43	-29.09
New Democratic	Aurele Ferlotte	1,927	33.28	+26.70
Progressive Conservative	Scott Chedore	608	10.50	-5.41
Confederation of Regions	Isabelle Ann Culverwell Davis	451	7.79	–
Total valid votes		5,790	100.0	
Liberal hold		Swing		-27.90

1987 New Brunswick general election
Party	Candidate	Votes	%	±%
Liberal	Allan Maher	4,479	77.52	+22.30
Progressive Conservative	Scott Chedore	919	15.91	-16.50
New Democratic	Stewart Beckingham	380	6.58	-4.21
Total valid votes		5,778	100.0	
Liberal hold		Swing		+19.40

1982 New Brunswick general election
Party	Candidate	Votes	%	±%
Liberal	Allan Maher	3,179	55.22	+5.17
Progressive Conservative	A.R. Sandy MacLean	1,866	32.41	-8.00
New Democratic	Bertha Huard	621	10.79	+5.76
Parti acadien	Réal Gendron	91	1.58	-2.94
Total valid votes		5,757	100.0	
Liberal hold		Swing		+6.58

1978 New Brunswick general election
Party	Candidate	Votes	%	±%
Liberal	Allan E. Maher	2,726	50.05	+7.48
Progressive Conservative	Aubrey Brownie	2,201	40.41	-9.03
New Democratic	Léopold Arseneault	274	5.03	+1.00
Parti acadien	Réal Gendron	246	4.52	+0.55
Total valid votes		5,447	100.0	
Liberal gain from Progressive Conservative		Swing		+8.26

1974 New Brunswick general election
Party	Candidate	Votes	%
Progressive Conservative	John Potter	2,627	49.44
Liberal	Allan Maher	2,262	42.57
New Democratic	John McEwen	214	4.03
Parti acadien	Réal Gendron	211	3.97
Total valid votes		5,314	100.0
The previous multi-member riding of Restigouche went totally Liberal in the previous election. None of the three incumbents ran in this riding.

== See also ==
- List of New Brunswick provincial electoral districts
- Canadian provincial electoral districts
