= Carleton Centre =

Defunct provincial electoral district in New Brunswick, Canada

New Brunswick electoral district

Defunct provincial electoral district
- Legislature: Legislative Assembly of New Brunswick
- District created: 1973
- District abolished: 1994
- First contested: 1974
- Last contested: 1991

Carleton Centre was a provincial electoral district in New Brunswick, Canada. It was created in the 1973 electoral redistribution from the multi-member riding of Carleton, and was abolished in the 1994 electoral redistribution.

== Members of the Legislative Assembly ==
Assembly	Years	Member	Party
Riding created from Carleton (1834–1974)
48th	1974–1978	Richard Hatfield	Progressive Conservative
49th	1978–1982	Richard Hatfield	Progressive Conservative
50th	1982–1987	Richard Hatfield	Progressive Conservative
51st	1987–1991	Allison DeLong	Liberal
52nd	1991–1995	Allison DeLong	Liberal
Riding dissolved into Carleton (1995–2014) and Woodstock

== Election results ==
1991 New Brunswick general election
Party	Candidate	Votes	%	±%
Liberal	Allison DeLong	2,087	42.95	-14.84
Progressive Conservative	Mary Hatfield	1,387	28.54	-9.88
Confederation of Regions	Lois M. Clark	1,281	26.36	–
New Democratic	Linda Marie Lawrence	104	2.14	-1.65
Total valid votes		4,859	100.0	
Liberal hold		Swing		-2.48

1987 New Brunswick general election
Party	Candidate	Votes	%	±%
Liberal	Allison Winston DeLong	2,787	57.79	+12.57
Progressive Conservative	Richard B. Hatfield	1,853	38.42	-13.43
New Democratic	Kathryn Campbell	183	3.79	+0.86
Total valid votes		4,823	100.0	
Liberal gain from Progressive Conservative		Swing		+13.00

1982 New Brunswick general election
Party	Candidate	Votes	%	±%
Progressive Conservative	Richard B. Hatfield	2,266	51.85	-2.24
Liberal	David E. Crouse	1,976	45.22	-0.69
New Democratic	L. William Maxon	128	2.93	–
Total valid votes		4,370	100.0	
Progressive Conservative hold		Swing		-0.78

1978 New Brunswick general election
Party	Candidate	Votes	%	±%
Progressive Conservative	Richard B. Hatfield	2,043	54.09	-7.97
Liberal	David Crouse	1,734	45.91	+7.97
Total valid votes		3,777	100.0	
Progressive Conservative hold		Swing		-7.97

1974 New Brunswick general election
Party	Candidate	Votes	%
Progressive Conservative	Richard B. Hatfield	2,033	62.06
Liberal	Aage Skaarup	1,243	37.94
Total valid votes		3,276	100.0
The former multi-member riding of Carleton went totally Progressive Conservative in the last election, with Richard Hatfield being one of three incumbents.

== See also ==
- List of New Brunswick provincial electoral districts
- Canadian provincial electoral districts
