= Madawaska Centre =

Defunct provincial electoral district in New Brunswick, Canada

Coordinates: 47.468°N 68.007°W

New Brunswick electoral district

Defunct provincial electoral district
- Legislature: Legislative Assembly of New Brunswick
- District created: 1973
- District abolished: 1994
- First contested: 1974
- Last contested: 1991

Madawaska Centre was a provincial electoral district in New Brunswick, Canada. It was created in the 1973 electoral redistribution from the multi-member riding of Madawaska and abolished in the 1994 electoral redistribution.

== Members of the Legislative Assembly ==
Assembly	Years	Member	Party
Riding created from Madawaska
48th	1974–1978	Gérald Clavette	Liberal
49th	1978–1982	Gérald Clavette	Liberal
50th	1982–1987	Gérald Clavette	Liberal
51st	1987–1991	Gérald Clavette	Liberal
52nd	1991–1995	Gérald Clavette	Liberal
Riding dissolved into Madawaska-la-Vallée, Edmundston and Madawaska-les-Lacs

== Election results ==
1991 New Brunswick general election
Party	Candidate	Votes	%	±%
Liberal	Gérald Clavette	2,942	58.14	-1.24
Progressive Conservative	Don Marmen	1,706	33.72	+0.41
New Democratic	Jean-Marie St-Onge	412	8.14	+0.80
Total valid votes		5,060	100.0	
Liberal hold		Swing		-0.82

1987 New Brunswick general election
Party	Candidate	Votes	%	±%
Liberal	Gérald Clavette	3,136	59.38	-7.19
Progressive Conservative	Don Marmen	1,759	33.31	+5.66
New Democratic	Paul Morneault	386	7.31	+1.53
Total valid votes		5,281	100.0	
Liberal hold		Swing		-6.42

1982 New Brunswick general election
Party	Candidate	Votes	%	±%
Liberal	Gérald Clavette	2,774	66.57	+6.34
Progressive Conservative	Jacques Tremblay	1,152	27.65	-9.23
New Democratic	Rodolphe Martin	241	5.78	–
Total valid votes		4,167	100.0	
Liberal hold		Swing		+7.78

1978 New Brunswick general election
Party	Candidate	Votes	%	±%
Liberal	Gérald Clavette	2,208	60.23	-4.05
Progressive Conservative	Léonard Plourde	1,352	36.88	+1.16
Parti acadien	Aline Thérèse Gagnon	106	2.89	–
Total valid votes		3,666	100.0	
Liberal hold		Swing		-2.60

== See also ==
- List of New Brunswick provincial electoral districts
- Canadian provincial electoral districts
