= Saint John-Fundy =

Defunct provincial electoral district in New Brunswick, Canada

New Brunswick electoral district
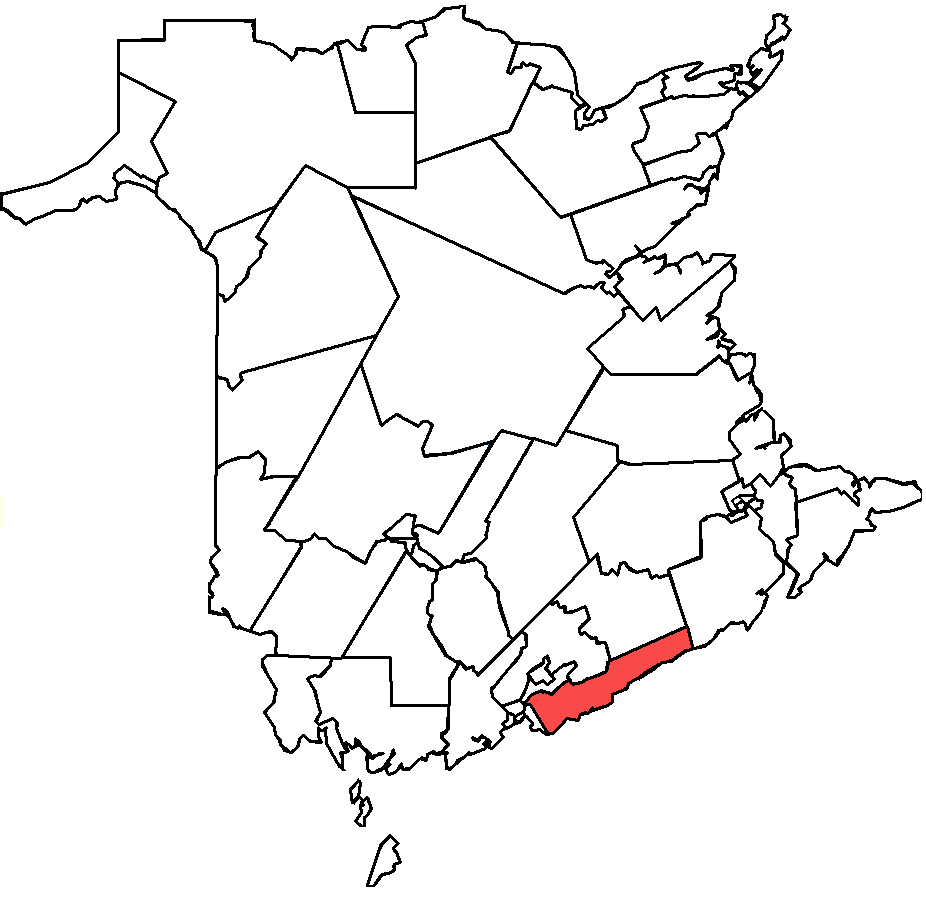
- Saint John-Fundy in relation to other New Brunswick Provincial electoral districts
- Coordinates: 45.471°N 65.491°W

Defunct provincial electoral district
- Legislature: Legislative Assembly of New Brunswick
- District created: 1973
- District abolished: 2013
- First contested: 1974
- Last contested: 2010

Demographics
- Population (): 14,510
- Census division: Saint John
- Census subdivision(s): Saint John, Fundy-St. Martins

Saint John-Fundy was a provincial electoral district for the Legislative Assembly of New Brunswick, Canada.

== Members of the Legislative Assembly ==
Assembly	Years	Member	Party
Riding created from Saint John East (1967–1974)
48th	1974–1978	Bill Woodroffe	Progressive Conservative
49th	1978–1982	Bev Harrison	Progressive Conservative
50th	1982–1987	Bev Harrison	Progressive Conservative
51st	1987–1991	Stuart Jamieson	Liberal
52nd	1991–1995	Stuart Jamieson	Liberal
53rd	1995–1999	Stuart Jamieson	Liberal
54th	1999–2003	Rodney Weston	Progressive Conservative
55th	2003–2006	Stuart Jamieson	Liberal
56th	2006–2010	Stuart Jamieson	Liberal
57th	2010–2014	Glen Savoie	Progressive Conservative
Riding dissolved into Saint John East, Rothesay, Hampton and Sussex-Fundy-St. Martins

== Election results ==
2010 New Brunswick general election
Party	Candidate	Votes	%	±%
Progressive Conservative	Glen Savoie	2,908	52.02	+14.17
Liberal	Gary Keating	1,734	31.02	-24.44
New Democratic	Lise Lennon	592	10.59	+3.90
Green	Matthew Ian Clark	185	3.31	–
People's Alliance	Glenn McAllister	171	3.06	–
Total valid votes		5,590	100.0	
Total rejected ballots		35	0.62	
Turnout		5,625	57.62	
Eligible voters		9,763		
Progressive Conservative gain from Liberal		Swing		+19.30
Source: Elections New Brunswick

2006 New Brunswick general election
Party	Candidate	Votes	%	±%
Liberal	Stuart Jamieson	3,124	55.46	+7.78
Progressive Conservative	Jim Huttges	2,132	37.85	-2.29
New Democratic	Mark LeBlanc	377	6.69	-2.45
Total valid votes		5,633	100.0	
Liberal hold		Swing		+5.04

2003 New Brunswick general election
Party	Candidate	Votes	%	±%
Liberal	Stuart Jamieson	2,698	47.68	+15.54
Progressive Conservative	Rodney Weston	2,271	40.14	-17.60
New Democratic	Liam Freill	517	9.14	+0.93
Grey	Marjorie MacMurray	172	3.04	–
Total valid votes		5,658	100.0	
Liberal gain from Progressive Conservative		Swing		+16.57

1999 New Brunswick general election
Party	Candidate	Votes	%	±%
Progressive Conservative	Rodney Weston	3,473	57.74	+19.71
Liberal	Stuart Jamieson	1,933	32.14	-8.98
New Democratic	Robert E. Holmes-Lauder	494	8.21	-8.06
Confederation of Regions	David Lytle	115	1.91	-1.85
Total valid votes		6,015	100.0	
Progressive Conservative gain from Liberal		Swing		+14.34

1995 New Brunswick general election
Party	Candidate	Votes	%	±%
Liberal	Stuart Jamieson	2,447	41.12	+9.60
Progressive Conservative	Rodney Weston	2,263	38.03	+9.07
New Democratic	Aubrey Fougere	968	16.27	+3.35
Confederation of Regions	Bernard Toole	224	3.76	-22.85
Natural Law	Phyllis Johnston	49	0.82	–
Total valid votes		5,951	100.0	
Liberal hold		Swing		+0.26

1991 New Brunswick general election
Party	Candidate	Votes	%	±%
Liberal	Stuart Jamieson	2,213	31.52	-9.87
Progressive Conservative	Bev Harrison	2,033	28.96	-7.49
Confederation of Regions	Gary William Vincent	1,868	26.61	–
New Democratic	Kathleen Fudge	907	12.92	-9.25
Total valid votes		7,012	100.0	
Liberal hold		Swing		-1.19

1987 New Brunswick general election
Party	Candidate	Votes	%	±%
Liberal	Stuart Jamieson	2,724	41.39	+14.09
Progressive Conservative	Bev Harrison	2,399	36.45	-11.46
New Democratic	Ben Donaldson	1,459	22.17	-2.61
Total valid votes		6,582	100.0	
Liberal gain from Progressive Conservative		Swing		+12.78

1982 New Brunswick general election
Party	Candidate	Votes	%	±%
Progressive Conservative	Bev Harrison	3,064	47.91	-0.91
Liberal	Fred Fuller	1,746	27.30	-3.16
New Democratic	Lawrence D. Hanley	1,585	24.78	+4.06
Total valid votes		6,395	100.0	
Progressive Conservative hold		Swing		+1.12

1978 New Brunswick general election
Party	Candidate	Votes	%	±%
Progressive Conservative	Beverly J. Harrison	2,196	48.82	+0.19
Liberal	Kevin Kilfoil	1,370	30.46	-15.97
New Democratic	Larry Hanley	932	20.72	+15.78
Total valid votes		4,498	100.0	
Progressive Conservative hold		Swing		+8.08

1974 New Brunswick general election
Party	Candidate	Votes	%
Progressive Conservative	W.J. "Bill" Woodroffe	2,125	48.63
Liberal	Gordon Foster	2,029	46.43
New Democratic	Eldon Richardson	216	4.94
Total valid votes		4,370	100.0
The previous multi-member riding of Saint John East went totally Progressive Conservative in the last election, with William J. Woodroffe being one of two incumbents.

== See also ==
- List of New Brunswick provincial electoral districts
- Canadian provincial electoral districts
