= 1973 New Brunswick electoral redistribution =

The 1973 New Brunswick electoral redistribution was the most radical redistribution of electoral districts in the history of New Brunswick, Canada. Under this redistribution, New Brunswick changed from a mixture of multi-member districts and single-member districts to a scheme of only single-member districts, from bloc voting electoral system to first past the post.

As the number of members per district had been re-evaluated as recently as 1967, the number of members was not changed, and multi-member districts were simply subdivided to form single-member districts.

Prior to the redistribution, New Brunswick had had the longest and deepest experience of multi-member districts of any province in Canada. The Block voting system in use though denied voters the proportional representation that they might otherwise have enjoyed.

== Transition of districts ==
Former electoral district	New electoral districts
Albert	Albert; Riverview
Bathurst	unchanged
Campbellton	unchanged
Carleton	Carleton Centre; Carleton North; Carleton South
Charlotte	Charlotte Centre; Charlotte-Fundy; Charlotte West; St. Stephen-Milltown
Edmundston	unchanged
Fredericton	Fredericton North; Fredericton South
Gloucester	Caraquet; Nepisiguit-Chaleur; Nigadoo-Chaleur; Shippagan-les-Îles; Tracadie
Kent	Kent Centre; Kent North; Kent South
Kings	Kings Centre; Kings East; Kings West
Madawaska	Madawaska Centre; Madawaska-les-Lacs; Madawaska South
Moncton	Moncton East; Moncton North; Moncton West
Northumberland	Bay du Vin; Chatham; Miramichi Bay; Miramichi-Newcastle; Southwest Miramichi
Queens	Queens North; Queens South
Restigouche	Dalhousie; Restigouche East; Restigouche West
Saint John Centre	Saint John Harbour; Saint John North; Saint John Park; Saint John South
Saint John East	East Saint John; Saint John-Fundy
Saint John West	unchanged
Sunbury	Oromocto; Sunbury
Victoria	Grand Falls; Victoria-Tobique
Westmorland	Memramcook; Petitcodiac; Shediac; Tantramar
York	York North; York South

== List of electoral districts ==
(each district returns one member)

- Albert
- Bathurst
- Bay du Vin
- Campbellton
- Caraquet
- Carleton Centre
- Carleton North
- Carleton South
- Charlotte Centre
- Charlotte-Fundy
- Charlotte West
- Chatham
- Dalhousie
- East Saint John
- Edmundston
- Fredericton North
- Fredericton South
- Grand Falls
- Kent Centre
- Kent North
- Kent South
- Kings Centre
- Kings East
- Kings West
- Madawaska Centre
- Madawaska-les-Lacs
- Madawaska South
- Memramcook
- Miramichi Bay
- Miramichi-Newcastle
- Moncton East
- Moncton North
- Moncton West
- Nepisiguit-Chaleur
- Nigadoo-Chaleur
- Oromocto
- Petitcodiac
- Queens North
- Queens South
- Restigouche East
- Restigouche West
- Riverview
- Saint John-Fundy
- Saint John Harbour
- Saint John North
- Saint John Park
- Saint John South
- Saint John West
- St. Stephen-Milltown
- Shediac
- Shippagan-les-Îles
- Southwest Miramichi
- Sunbury
- Tantramar
- Tracadie
- Victoria-Tobique
- York North
- York South

Preceded by 1967	New Brunswick electoral redistributions	Succeeded by 1994
