= Saint John Park =

Defunct provincial electoral district in New Brunswick, Canada

New Brunswick electoral district

Defunct provincial electoral district
- Legislature: Legislative Assembly of New Brunswick
- District created: 1973
- District abolished: 1994
- First contested: 1974
- Last contested: 1991

Saint John Park was a provincial electoral district in New Brunswick, Canada. It was created from the multi-member riding of Saint John Centre in the 1973 electoral redistribution, and was abolished in the 1994 electoral redistribution.

== Members of the Legislative Assembly ==
Assembly	Years	Member	Party
Riding created from Saint John Centre
48th	1974–1978	Robert Higgins	Liberal
49th	1978–1982	Shirley Dysart	Liberal
50th	1982–1987	Shirley Dysart	Liberal
51st	1987–1991	Shirley Dysart	Liberal
52nd	1991–1995	Shirley Dysart	Liberal
Riding dissolved into Saint John Portland and Saint John Champlain

== Election results ==
1991 New Brunswick general election
Party	Candidate	Votes	%	±%
Liberal	Shirley Dysart	1,743	42.74	-16.33
Confederation of Regions	Richard Condon Sullivan Kinsella	825	20.23	–
New Democratic	Judith Meinert	777	19.05	-3.23
Progressive Conservative	Shirley McAlary	733	17.97	-0.69
Total valid votes		4,078	100.0	
Liberal hold		Swing		-18.28

1987 New Brunswick general election
Party	Candidate	Votes	%	±%
Liberal	Shirley Dysart	2,596	59.07	+13.16
New Democratic	Paul Allen Maccovour	979	22.28	+7.43
Progressive Conservative	Jean Porter	820	18.66	-20.57
Total valid votes		4,395	100.0	
Liberal hold		Swing		+2.86

1982 New Brunswick general election
Party	Candidate	Votes	%	±%
Liberal	Shirley Dysart	2,247	45.91	-1.09
Progressive Conservative	Twyla Hartt	1,920	39.23	-0.66
New Democratic	David T. Pye	727	14.85	+1.74
Total valid votes		4,894	100.0	
Liberal hold		Swing		-0.22

1978 New Brunswick general election
Party	Candidate	Votes	%	±%
Liberal	Shirley Dysart	1,976	47.00	-15.14
Progressive Conservative	Garry Bona	1,677	39.89	+5.97
New Democratic	David T. Pye	551	13.11	+9.16
Total valid votes		4,204	100.0	
Liberal hold		Swing		-10.56

1974 New Brunswick general election
Party	Candidate	Votes	%
Liberal	Robert Higgins	3,307	62.14
Progressive Conservative	Donald S. Greenlaw	1,805	33.92
New Democratic	Gary Donald Nesbit	210	3.95
Total valid votes		5,322	100.0
The previous multi-member riding of Saint John Centre elected three Progressive Conservatives and one Liberal in the previous election, one of the PC seats was won by a Liberal in a by-election. Robert J. Higgins was one of four incumbents.

== See also ==
- List of New Brunswick provincial electoral districts
- Canadian provincial electoral districts
