= William J. Woodroffe =

Canadian politician

Speaker of the Legislative Assembly of New Brunswick
- In office 1973–1978
- Preceded by: Lawrence Garvie
- Succeeded by: Robert McCready

MLA for Saint John-Fundy
- In office 1967–1978
- Succeeded by: Bev Harrison

Personal details
- Born: May 13, 1933 Saint John, New Brunswick
- Died: September 24, 2003 (aged 70)
- Party: Progressive Conservative
- Spouse: Doreen S. Mills
- Occupation: Insurance Adjustor

William J. "Bill" Woodroffe (May 13, 1933 – September 26, 2003) was a political figure in New Brunswick, Canada. He represented Saint John East in the Legislative Assembly of New Brunswick from 1967 to 1978 as a Progressive Conservative member.

He was born in Saint John, New Brunswick, the son of Raymond Henry Woodroffe and Lilia Helen Sewell. In 1957, he married Doreen S. Mills. He had one son and two daughters. He served as a member of the Saint John City Council. Woodroffe was speaker for the provincial assembly from 1973 to 1978, during the Premiership of PC Richard Hatfield.
