= George Everett Chalmers =

Canadian politician

George Everett Chalmers (June 5, 1905 – April 26, 1993) was a medical doctor, surgeon and political figure in New Brunswick, Canada. He represented the ridings of York County, City of Fredericton and Fredericton South in the Legislative Assembly of New Brunswick from 1963 to 1978 as a Progressive Conservative member.

He was born in Bathurst, New Brunswick, the son of George Wilson Chalmers and May Branch. Chalmers was educated at the University of New Brunswick and McGill University Faculty of Medicine, from which he graduated in 1933. He interned for 2 years at the Royal Victoria Hospital in Montreal, QC and 1 year at the Saint John General Hospital in Saint John, NB before moving to Fredericton, NB in 1936.

During World War II he enlisted as a Lieutenant in the Royal Canadian Army Medical Corps but was unable to serve abroad due to diabetes. In 1939 Dr. Chalmers was a founding member of the Fredericton Medical Clinic, the city's largest health clinic. He served as a city councillor for the Fredericton City Council from 1945 to 1949.

== Political career ==
Dr. Chalmers became involved in politics in 1948 when he supported former Ontario premier George Drew at the leadership convention in his successful bid to lead the Progressive Conservative Party of Canada; Drew having defeated his opponent John Diefenbaker on the first ballot.

Between 1947 and 1960, Dr. Chalmers was a key backroom supporter of the Progressive Conservative Party of New Brunswick while at the same time serving as Surgeon-in-Chief, President of the Medical Staff, and member of the Board of Directors for the Victoria Public Hospital in Fredericton. Chalmers used his influence with PC Party Leader and Premier of New Brunswick Hugh John Flemming to upgrade medical facilities in Fredericton during the 1950s.

Dr. Chalmers ran as a Progressive Conservative candidate in the riding of Fredericton South during the 1960 provincial election and was successful in being elected as a member of Her Majesty's Loyal Opposition in the Legislative Assembly of New Brunswick. He was re-elected as a member of the opposition in the 1963 and 1967 elections, during which time he also served on the hospital building committee, which was seeking to replace the Victoria Public Hospital with a new regional hospital.

Upon Dr. Chalmers' re-election in the 1970 provincial election, the Progressive Conservatives under the leadership of Richard Hatfield formed the government. Chalmers was appointed to the Executive Council and served as a "Minister Without Portfolio" from 1970 to 1972 and again from 1976 to 1978. Chalmers used his cabinet position in the early 1970s to advocate for the new regional hospital, as well as for solutions to alcohol and drug addiction problems in the province.

The opening of Fredericton's new regional hospital in 1976 saw it named the Dr. Everett Chalmers Regional Hospital in honour of his efforts.

Chalmers left politics and retired from actively practising medicine in 1978. He was appointed chair of the Alcoholism and Drug Dependency Commission of New Brunswick and served as a consulting emeritus in general surgery at the hospital named after him.

Dr. Chalmers died on April 26, 1993, in Fredericton.

== Personal life ==
In 1935 Dr. Chalmers married Eloise Roberts and they had two children. Chalmers' wife died in 1954 and in 1956 he re-married to Mrs. Winnifred Hickey who already had two children from her previous marriage; they subsequently had two additional children. His brother Robert Chalmers (1913 - 2003) was a prominent local obstetrician and gynecologist.

Dr. Chalmers' eldest daughter Sharon Pollock was a Canadian playwright. The character "Ev" in Pollock's play Doc is based on Dr. Everett Chalmers

His granddaughter Jennifer Pollock was an active political figure in Alberta. She represented Ward 1 and Ward 2 as a Public School Trustee on the Calgary Board of Education from 1992 to 1999. She was a candidate for the Liberal Party of Canada in the federal riding of Calgary West in the 2006 and 2008 federal elections.

== See also ==
- Dr. Everett Chalmers Regional Hospital
