= Stuart Jamieson =

Canadian politician (born 1951)

Member of the New Brunswick Legislative Assembly for Saint John-Fundy
- In office June 9, 2003 – September 27, 2010
- Preceded by: Rodney Weston
- Succeeded by: Glen Savoie
- In office October 13, 1987 – June 7, 1999
- Preceded by: Bev Harrison
- Succeeded by: Rodney Weston

Personal details
- Born: October 22, 1951 (age 74) Saint John, New Brunswick, Canada
- Party: Liberal

Stuart Jamieson (born October 22, 1951, in Saint John, New Brunswick) was a politician in the Province of New Brunswick, Canada. A self-employed carpenter, he was elected to the Legislative Assembly of New Brunswick in 1987 and re-elected in 1991, 1995 and re-elected again in 2003 and 2006 after having been defeated in 1999.

He represented the electoral district of Saint John-Fundy and was a member of the cabinet from 1998 to 1999 and from 2006 to 2010. He was removed from cabinet on February 5, 2010, for suggesting that the NB Power deal be put to a referendum.

New Brunswick provincial government of Shawn Graham
Cabinet post (1)
| Predecessor | Office | Successor |
|---|---|---|
| Joan MacAlpine-Stiles | Minister of Tourism and Parks; 2006–2010 | incumbent |
Special Cabinet Responsibilities
| Predecessor | Title | Successor |
| Bev Harrison | Government House Leader; 2006–2007 | Mike Murphy |
New Brunswick provincial government of Camille Thériault
Cabinet post (1)
| Predecessor | Office | Successor |
| Doug Tyler | Minister of Agriculture and Rural Development; 1998–1999 | Milton Sherwood |
