= Allan E. Maher =

Canadian politician and funeral director

Allan E. Maher (born February 16, 1938) is a former funeral director and political figure in New Brunswick, Canada. He represented Dalhousie in the Legislative Assembly of New Brunswick from 1978 to 1995 as a Liberal member.

He was born in Chatham, New Brunswick, the son of Holt A. Maher and Dorothea Ferguson, and was educated at the New England Institute. In 1958, he married Helen K. Payne. Maher served as mayor of Dalhousie. He was an unsuccessful candidate for a seat in the provincial assembly in 1974 before being elected in 1978. Maher served in the province's Executive Council as Minister of Finance and as Minister responsible for the New Brunswick Liquor Corporation. Maher went on to serve as chairman for the board of governors for the New Brunswick Sports Hall of Fame In 2012–2013, he was co-chair of the New Brunswick Electoral Boundaries Commission.
