= Lawrence Garvie =

Canadian politician

Lawrence R. Garvie (June 23, 1933 – March 11, 2011) was a lawyer and former politician in New Brunswick, Canada. He represented the City of Fredericton and then Fredericton North in the Legislative Assembly of New Brunswick from 1968 to 1978 as a Progressive Conservative member.

He was born in Westmount, Quebec, the son of Gordon S. Garvie and Helen Carten, and educated in Fredericton and at the University of New Brunswick. In 1960, he married Valerie Bennetts. He was first elected to the provincial assembly in a 1968 by-election held after the death of John F. McInerney. Garvie served as speaker for the assembly from 1971 to 1972. He then became a member of Premier Richard Hatfield's Cabinet, serving as Minister of Health from 1972 to 1974, Minister of Economic Growth from 1974 to 1976 (he became the first Minister of Commerce and Development when the department was renamed during the latter part of his tenure), Minister of Finance from 1976 to 1977 and Minister of Labour from 1977 to 1978. While serving as Minister of Economic Growth, Garvie played a role in stopping further government funding of the Bricklin sports car. He retired from politics in 1978.

Garvie died on March 11, 2011, at the Chalmers Regional Hospital in Fredericton, New Brunswick.
