= 1974 New Brunswick general election =

Canadian provincial election

← 1970	November 18, 1974	1978 →

58 seats of the Legislative Assembly of New Brunswick 30 seats needed for a majority
	First party	Second party
		Lib
Leader	Richard Hatfield	Robert Higgins
Party	Progressive Conservative	Liberal
Leader since	1967	1971
Leader's seat	Carleton Centre	Saint John Park
Last election	32	26
Seats won	33	25
Seat change	▲1	▼1
Percentage	46.86%	47.52%
Swing	▼1.54%	▼1.08
- Popular vote by riding. As this is an FPTP election, seat totals are not determined by popular vote, but instead via results by each riding.
Premier before election
Richard Hatfield
Progressive Conservative
Premier after election
Richard Hatfield
Progressive Conservative

The 1974 New Brunswick general election was held on November 18, 1974, to elect 58 members to the 48th New Brunswick Legislative Assembly, the governing house of the province of New Brunswick, Canada. It saw Richard Hatfield's Progressive Conservative Party of New Brunswick win its second majority government with a gain of one seat despite losing the popular vote to Robert J. Higgins's New Brunswick Liberal Party. For the second election in a row, the Conservatives received a majority in the parliament despite receiving fewer votes than the Liberals.

Despite the Hatfield government's involvement in the failed Bricklin SV-1 automobile plant and a series of kickback schemes, there were few surprises during the campaign. Hatfield had made inroads in the Acadian community since the 1970 election, winning three francophone seats in by-elections. The Acadian support proved key during Hatfield's entire term as premier.

This was the first New Brunswick election in which candidates contested only single-member ridings, established as a result of the 1973 electoral redistribution; previous elections had each county as an electoral district electing a varying number of members, based on their respective populations, with multi-member districts predominating.

== Results ==
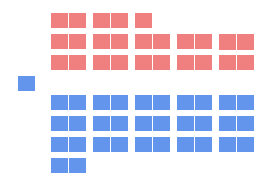
Rendition of party representation in the 48th New Brunswick Legislative Assembly decided by this election Progressive Conservatives (33) Liberals (25)

Summary of the 1974 Legislative Assembly of New Brunswick election results
Party	Party leader	# of candidates	Seats				Popular vote		
Party	Party leader	# of candidates	1970	Dissolution	Elected	Change	#	%	% Change
Progressive Conservative	Richard Hatfield	58	32	32	33	+1	145,304	46.86	-1.54
Liberal	Robert Higgins	58	26	26	25	-1	147,372	47.53	-1.08
New Democratic	Albert Richardson	35	0	0	0	0	9,092	2.93	+0.10
Parti Acadien	Euclide Chaisson	13	0	0	0	0	3,607	1.16	
Independents		11	0	0	0	0	4,723	1.52	

Popular vote
Liberal	47.53%
PC	46.86%
New Democratic	2.93%
Others	2.68%

Seats summary
PC	56.90%
Liberal	43.10%
