= 53rd New Brunswick Legislature =

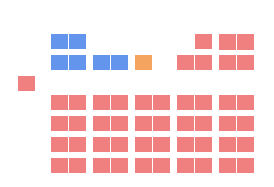
Rendition of party representation in the 53rd New Brunswick Legislative Assembly, at its first session after the 1995 election. Liberals (48) Progressive Conservatives (6) New Democrats (1)

The 53rd New Brunswick Legislative Assembly was created following a general election in 1995 and was dissolved on May 8, 1999.

== Leadership ==
The speaker from its first meeting until July 21, 1997, was Danny Gay, Gay resigned the speakership to join the cabinet. John McKay was elected to succeed Gay as speaker later in the session.

Premier Frank McKenna led the government from the beginning of the assembly until he resigned on October 12, 1997. He was succeeded as Premier by Ray Frenette who served as interim leader of McKenna's Liberals until Camille Thériault was elected as permanent leader. Thériault led the government as Premier from May 14, 1998

The opposition was led from the forming of the assembly until 1997 by Bernard Valcourt, then by Elvy Robichaud who served as parliamentary leader of the Progressive Conservatives until Bernard Lord, who succeeded Valcourt as PC leader in 1997, gained a seat in 1998.

Elizabeth Weir led the third party New Democrats for the life of the assembly.

== Members ==
All were elected in the 33rd general election held on September 11, 1995, except for James Doyle and Peter Mesheau, elected in by-elections on November 17, 1997, and Shawn Graham, Brad Green and Bernard Lord elected in by-elections on October 19, 1998. Albert Doucet was removed from the Liberal cabinet on February 5, 1997 and then was removed from caucus in March of that year, sitting as an independent until January 30, 1998 when he was accepted back into the Liberal fold.

=== Members at dissolution ===
Name	Party	Electoral District	First elected / previously elected
**Harry Doyle**	Liberal	Albert	1995
**Marcelle Mersereau**	Liberal	Bathurst	1991
**Edmond Blanchard**	Liberal	Campbellton	1987
**Bernard Thériault**	Liberal	Caraquet	1987
Dale Graham	Progressive Conservative	Carleton	1993
Denis Landry	Liberal	Centre-Péninsule	1995
**Sheldon Lee**	Liberal	Charlotte	1978
Carolle de Ste. Croix	Liberal	Dalhousie-Restigouche East	1995
**Greg O'Donnell**	Liberal	Dieppe-Memramcook	1987
Bernard Valcourt	Progressive Conservative	Edmundston	1995
Jim Wilson	Liberal	Fredericton North	1987, 1995
**Russell H. T. King**	Liberal	Fredericton South	1987
Brad Green (1998)	Progressive Conservative	Fredericton South	1998
**Greg Byrne**	Liberal	Fredericton-Fort Nashwaak	1995
Eric Allaby	Liberal	Fundy Isles	1987
Milt Sherwood	Progressive Conservative	Grand Bay-Westfield	1995
Paul Duffie	Liberal	Grand Falls Region	1987
**Doug Tyler**	Liberal	Grand Lake	1987
**Georgie Day**	Liberal	Hampton-Belleisle	1991
Peter LeBlanc	Liberal	Kennebecasis	1995
**Alan R. Graham**	Liberal	Kent	1967
Shawn Graham (1998)	Liberal	Kent	1998
**Camille Thériault**	Liberal	Kent South	1987
LeRoy Armstrong	Liberal	Kings East	1995
**Jean-Camille DeGrâce**	Liberal	Lamèque-Shippagan-Miscou	1995
David Olmstead	Liberal	Mactaquac	1995
Percy Mockler	Progressive Conservative	Madawaska-la-Vallée	1982, 1993
Jeannot Volpé	Progressive Conservative	Madawaska-les-Lacs	1995
**Danny Gay**	Liberal	Miramichi Bay	1987
John McKay†	Liberal	Miramichi Centre	1974, 1987
**Frank McKenna**	Liberal	Miramichi-Bay du Vin	1982
James Doyle (1997)	Liberal	Miramichi-Bay du Vin	1997
Ken MacLeod	Liberal	Moncton Crescent	1995
**Raymond Frenette**	Liberal	Moncton East	1974
Bernard Lord (1998)	Progressive Conservative	Moncton East	1998
**Gene Devereux**	Liberal	Moncton North	1995
**James E. Lockyer**	Liberal	Moncton South	1987
Alban Landry	Liberal	Nepisiguit	1995
**Joan Kingston**	Liberal	New Maryland	1995
**Albert Doucet**	Liberal	Nigadoo-Chaleur	1991
**Albert Doucet**	Independent	Nigadoo-Chaleur	1991
**Albert Doucet**	Liberal	Nigadoo-Chaleur	1991
Vaughn Blaney	Liberal	Oromocto-Gagetown	1987
Hollis Steeves	Liberal	Petitcodiac	1987, 1995
**Jean-Paul Savoie**	Liberal	Restigouche West	1987
Al Kavanaugh	Liberal	Riverview	1995
Kenneth Johnson	Liberal	Rogersville-Kouchibouguac	1995
**Roly MacIntyre**	Liberal	Saint John Champlain	1995
Elizabeth Weir	New Democratic	Saint John Harbour	1991
Jane Barry	Liberal	Saint John Lancaster	1987
Leo McAdam	Liberal	Saint John Portland	1987
**Stuart Jamieson**	Liberal	Saint John-Fundy	1987
Laureen Jarrett	Liberal	Saint John-Kings	1987
**Bernard Richard**	Liberal	Shediac-Cap-Pélé	1991
**Reg MacDonald**	Liberal	Southwest Miramichi	1979, 1987
**Marilyn Trenholme**	Liberal	Tantramar	1987
Peter Mesheau (1997)	Progressive Conservative	Tantramar	1997
Elvy Robichaud	Progressive Conservative	Tracadie-Sheila	1994
Larry Kennedy	Liberal	Victoria-Tobique	1987
**Ann Breault**	Liberal	Western Charlotte	1987
Bruce Smith	Liberal	Woodstock	1987
John Flynn	Liberal	York	1995

Bold denotes a member of the cabinet.
Italics denotes a party leader
† denotes the Speaker

=== Former members ===
- Marilyn Trenholme Counsell, a Liberal, was first elected to the legislature in the 1987 election, she resigned in 1997 to accept an appointment as Lieutenant-Governor of New Brunswick.
- Frank McKenna, a Liberal, was first elected to the legislature in the 1982 election, he resigned in 1997 in conjunction with his resignation as Premier.
- Ray Frenette, a Liberal, was first elected to the legislature in the 1974 election, he resigned in 1998 following his resignation as Premier.
- Alan Graham, a Liberal, was first elected to the legislature in the 1967 election, he resigned in 1998 after retiring from the cabinet.
- Russell King, a Liberal, was first elected to the legislature in the 1987 election, he resigned in 1998 after retiring from the cabinet.

== See also ==
- 1995 New Brunswick general election
- Legislative Assembly of New Brunswick

Preceded by 52nd Assembly	New Brunswick Legislative Assemblies; 1995–1999	Succeeded by 54th Assembly
