= 1995 New Brunswick general election =

Canadian provincial election

- September 11, 1995

55 seats of the Legislative Assembly of New Brunswick 28 seats needed for a majority
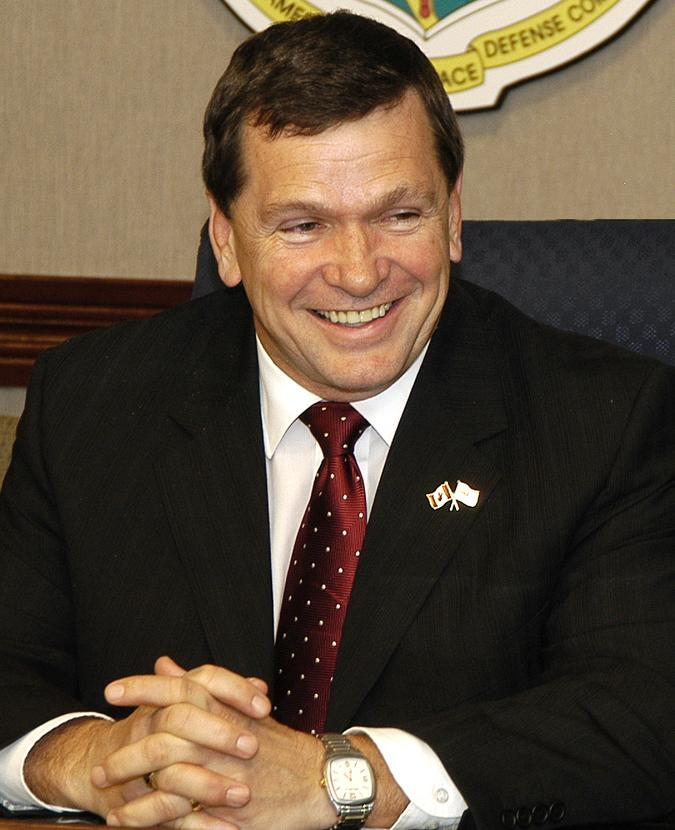
	First party	Second party
		PC
Leader	Frank McKenna	Bernard Valcourt
Party	Liberal	Progressive Conservative
Leader since	1985	1995
Leader's seat	Miramichi-Bay du Vin	Edmundston
Last election	46	3
Seats won	48	6
Seat change	▲2	▲3
Popular vote	201,150	120,247
Percentage	51.63%	30.87%
Swing	▲4.52%	▲10.17%
	Third party	Fourth party
	NDP	CoR
Leader	Elizabeth Weir	Greg Hargrove
Party	New Democratic	Confederation of Regions
Leader since	1988	1995
Leader's seat	Saint John Harbour	Mactaquac (lost re-election)
Last election	1	8
Seats won	1	0
Seat change	Steady	▼8
Popular vote	37,579	27,684
Percentage	9.65%	7.11%
Swing	▼1.13%	▼14.09%
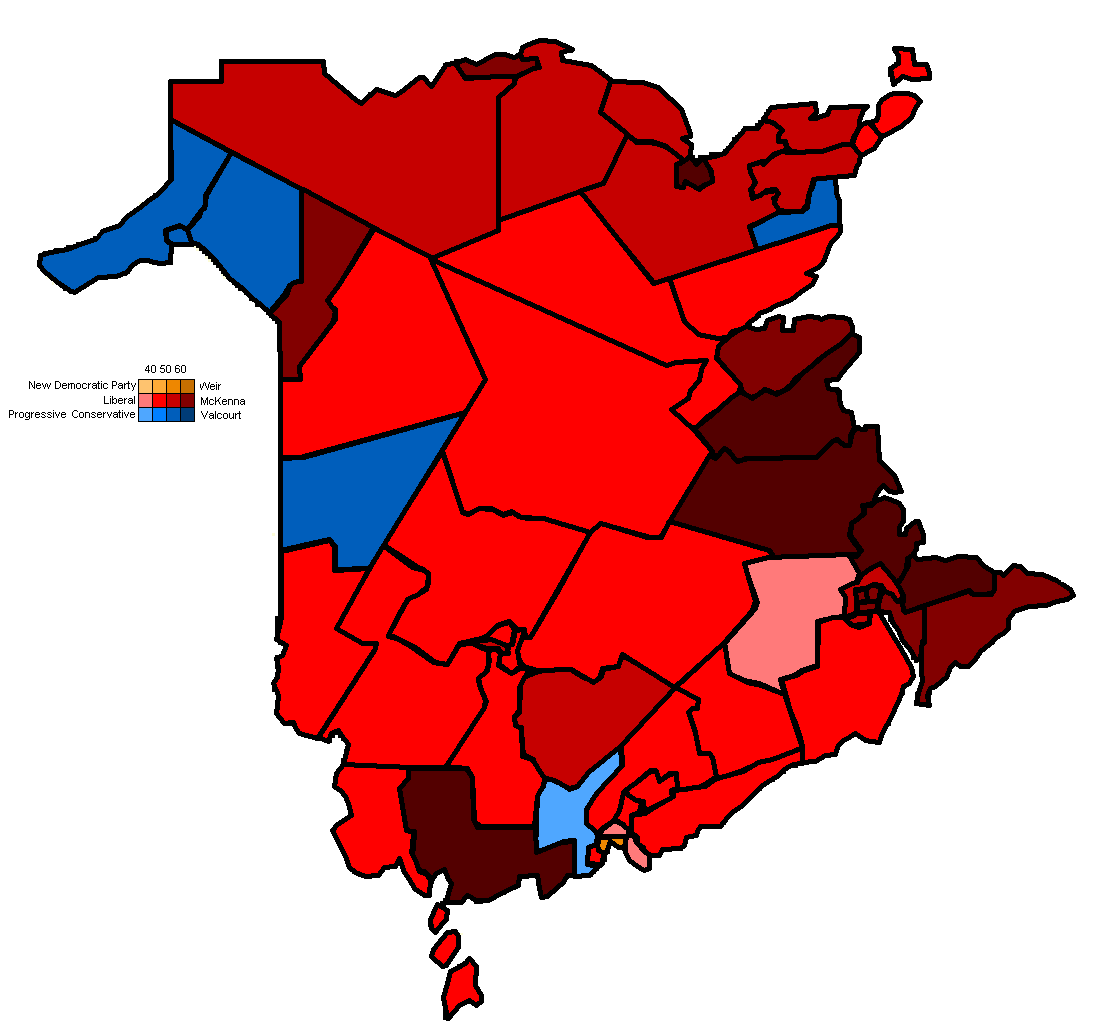
- Map of New Brunswick's ridings coloured in based on the winning parties and their popular vote
Premier before election
Frank McKenna
Liberal
Premier after election
Frank McKenna
Liberal

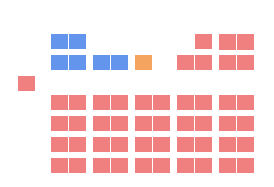
Rendition of party representation in the 53rd New Brunswick Legislative Assembly decided by this election. Liberals (48) Progressive Conservatives (6) New Democrats (1)

The 1995 New Brunswick general election was held on September 11, 1995, to elect the 55 members of the 53rd New Brunswick Legislative Assembly.

The Liberals won their third consecutive majority government, with Premier McKenna's personal popularity aiding the Liberals in retaining a large majority. The PCs managed only 6 seats, while the CoR lost all theirs. The combined PC-CoR vote exceeded that of the Liberals in an additional 10 ridings (Albert, Fundy Isles, Kings East, Mactaquac, Petitcodiac, Saint John-Fundy, Southwest Miramichi, Victoria-Tobique, Western Charlotte and Woodstock).

== Background ==
The election marked the debut of Bernard Valcourt as a provincial politician, and as leader of a reinvigorated Progressive Conservative Party. A popular politician from Edmundston, Valcourt had served as an MP from 1984 to 1993, serving in the cabinets of Prime Ministers Brian Mulroney and Kim Campbell. The New Brunswick PCs had been in the political wilderness for the better part of a decade; they were shut out of the legislature in 1987, and only managed a third-place showing with 3 seats in 1991. The internal disarray of the CoR party had vacated room on the right for the PCs, and polls suggested a more competitive race than in the previous few elections.

Frank McKenna's Liberal Party sought a third term in government, as the Confederation of Regions (CoR) party struggled to survive after considerable internal strife. Elizabeth Weir tried to expand her New Democratic Party's foothold in the legislature.

This election was the first since 1974 to feature a boundary redistribution, with an overall reduction in the size of the legislature from 58 to 55 seats.

== Opinion polls ==
Evolution of voting intentions at provincial level
Polling firm	Last day of survey	Source	NBLA	NBPC	NBNDP	CoR	Other	ME	Sample
Election 1995	September 11, 1995		51.63	30.87	9.65	7.11	0.75		
Omnifacts	September 4, 1995		66	21	9	4	—N/a	4.5	498
Corporate Research Associates	August 1995		64	12	5	6	—N/a	—N/a	—N/a
Omnifacts	August 1995		56	15.9	4.6	1.4	—N/a	—N/a	614
Election 1991	September 23, 1991		47.11	20.69	10.78	21.18	0.24		

== Results ==
Party	Party Leader	# of candidates	Seats				Popular Vote		
Party	Party Leader	# of candidates	1991	Dissolution	Elected	% Change	#	%	Change
Liberal	Frank McKenna	55	46	42	48	+4.3%	201,150	51.63%	+4.52%
Progressive Conservative	Bernard Valcourt	55	3	6	6	+100%	120,247	30.87%	+10.17%
New Democratic	Elizabeth Weir	55	1	1	1	-	37,579	9.65%	-1.13%
Confederation of Regions	Greg Hargrove	36	8	6	0	-100%	27,684	7.11%	-14.09%
Natural Law	Christopher Collrin	17	*	-	-	-	1,267	0.33%	*
Independents		8	-	2	-	-	1,635	0.42%	+0.21%
Vacant				1					
Total		226	58	58	55	-5.45%	389,562	100%	-5.65%

* Natural Law did not contest the 1991 election.

Popular vote
Liberal	51.63%
PC	30.87%
New Democratic	9.65%
Conf. of Regions	7.11%
Others	0.74%

Seats summary
Liberal	87.27%
PC	10.91%
New Democratic	1.82%

== Candidates ==
Many new and changed districts were used for the first time in this election as a result of an electoral redistribution.

Legend

- **bold** denotes a party leader
- italics denotes a potential candidate who has not received his/her party's nomination
- † denotes an incumbent who is not running for re-election
- * denotes an incumbent seeking re-election in a new district

=== Northern New Brunswick ===
Electoral district	Candidates				Incumbent
Electoral district	Liberal	PC	NDP	Other	Incumbent
1. Restigouche West	Jean Paul Savoie 3,745	Luc LeBrun 3,230	Wendy Martin 200	Marcelle Lamontagne (Natural Law) 93	Jean-Paul Savoie
2. Campbellton	Edmond Blanchard 4,831	Florent Jim Levesque 1,207	Louis Renaud 425	Harold I. Hargrove (CoR) 368; Laurent Maltais (Natural Law) 93	Edmond Blanchard
3. Dalhousie-Restigouche East	Carolle de Ste. Croix 4,006	Gail Walsh 743	Aurèle Ferlatte 2,753	Charles Gendron Stewart (Ind.) 220; Chris Jensen (Natural Law) 81	Allan Maher†
3. Dalhousie-Restigouche East	Carolle de Ste. Croix 4,006	Gail Walsh 743	Aurèle Ferlatte 2,753	Charles Gendron Stewart (Ind.) 220; Chris Jensen (Natural Law) 81	merged district
3. Dalhousie-Restigouche East	Carolle de Ste. Croix 4,006	Gail Walsh 743	Aurèle Ferlatte 2,753	Charles Gendron Stewart (Ind.) 220; Chris Jensen (Natural Law) 81	Rayburn Doucett†
4. Nigadoo-Chaleur	Albert Doucet 4,421	Maxime Lejeune 2,555	Ulric DeGrâce 662	Francine Richard (Natural Law) 126	Albert Doucet
5. Bathurst	Marcelle Mersereau 4,956	Graham Wiseman 695	Kim Power 824	William Parker (Natural Law) 88	Marcelle Mersereau
6. Nepisiguit	Alban Landry 3,715	Anne-Marie Gammon 1,953	Normand Savoie 690	Andie Haché (Natural Law) 87	Frank Branch†
7. Caraquet	Bernard Thériault 4,367	Bernard Haché 1,804	Jean-Marie Nadeau 1,792	Marc Boulay (Natural Law) 68	Bernard Thériault
8. Lamèque-Shippagan-Miscou	Jean-Camille DeGrâce 4,124	Paul Robichaud 4,096	Daniel Brindle 222	Gilles Godin 56	Jean Gauvin†
9. Centre-Péninsule	Denis Landry 3,448	Roland Mallais 2,749	Pierre Cousineau 373		new district
10. Tracadie-Sheila	George McLaughlin 3,803	Elvy Robichaud 4,214	Aldoria Noël 172		Elvy Robichaud

=== Eastern New Brunswick ===
Electoral district	Candidates				Incumbent
Electoral district	Liberal	PC	NDP	Other	Incumbent
11. Miramichi Bay	Danny Gay 3,504	Jim Gordon 3,334	Mary M. Parker 237	Allison Furlotte (CoR) 91	Danny Gay
12. Miramichi-Bay du Vin	**Frank McKenna** 5,089	Scott Hickey 2,114	Debbie McGraw 617	Brian E. Farrah (Natural Law) 92	**Frank McKenna**
12. Miramichi-Bay du Vin	**Frank McKenna** 5,089	Scott Hickey 2,114	Debbie McGraw 617	Brian E. Farrah (Natural Law) 92	merged district
12. Miramichi-Bay du Vin	**Frank McKenna** 5,089	Scott Hickey 2,114	Debbie McGraw 617	Brian E. Farrah (Natural Law) 92	Reg MacDonald
13. Miramichi Centre	John McKay 4,081	Paul Dawson 3,803	Terry Carter 353		John McKay
14. Southwest Miramichi	Reg MacDonald* 3,227	Andy Dawson 2,326	Allan Goodfellow 337	Gerald Stewart (CoR) 1,055; Gayer Holmes (Ind.) 147	Brent Taylor†
15. Rogersville-Kouchibouguac	Kenneth Johnson 3,530	Hermel Mazerolle 2,728	Charles Richard 493		new district
16. Kent	Alan Graham 4,318	Stéphane Comeau 903	John LaBossiere 522	Percy R. Beers (CoR) 387	Alan Graham
16. Kent	Alan Graham 4,318	Stéphane Comeau 903	John LaBossiere 522	Percy R. Beers (CoR) 387	merged district
16. Kent	Alan Graham 4,318	Stéphane Comeau 903	John LaBossiere 522	Percy R. Beers (CoR) 387	Conrad Landry†
17. Kent South	Camille Thériault 6,313	Charles Ryan 1,774	Clifford Meunier 740		Camille Thériault
18. Shediac-Cap-Pélé	Bernard Richard 6,963	Jean-Claude Bourque 1,006	John Gagnon 543		Bernard Richard

=== Southeastern New Brunswick ===
Electoral district	Candidates					Incumbent
Electoral district	Liberal	PC	NDP	CoR	Other	Incumbent
19. Tantramar	Marilyn Trenholme 3,414	Eric Wheeler 654	Berkeley Fleming 844	Julia Stevens 553		Marilyn Trenholme Counsell
20. Dieppe-Memramcook	Greg O'Donnell 6,639	Bernard Lord 2,181	Bernice Butler 577	Robert Henry 177		Greg O'Donnell
21. Moncton East	Ray Frenette 4,466	Brian Donaghy 1,302	Gérard Snow 854	Gerry Fullerton 604		Ray Frenette
22. Moncton South	Jim Lockyer 4,332	Bob Leighton 1,236	Blair McInnis 577	Don Freeman 861		James E. Lockyer
23. Moncton North	Gene Devereux 4,333	Marc LeBlanc 1,139	Mark Robar 608	Cyril Flanagan 945	Michael Boucher (Natural Law) 40	vacant
24. Moncton Crescent	Kenneth R. MacLeod 3,832	Barbara Winsor 1,489	Richard Hay 426	Dean Ryder 1,017	Richard Mullins 227	new district
25. Petitcodiac	Hollis Steeves 2,398	Charles Harmer 1,650	Jennifer Stairs 310	Tom Taylor 1,673		Dennis Cochrane†
26. Riverview	Al Kavanaugh 4,090	Scott MacGregor 1,712	David Bailie 317	Doug Roper 1,436		Gordon Wilden*
27. Albert	Harry Doyle 2,871	Wayne Steeves 1,964	Elizabeth Venart 353	Doug Duff 1,350		Beverly Brine†
28. Kings East	LeRoy Armstrong 3,074	Hazen Myers 3,030	Brian Stone 325	Gordon Willden* 548	Brian A. Chown (Ind.) 193	Hazen Myers

=== Greater Saint John & Fundy Coast ===
Electoral district	Candidates					Incumbent
Electoral district	Liberal	PC	NDP	CoR	Other	Incumbent
29. Hampton-Belleisle	Georgie Day* 3,310	Ronald Hatfield 2,837	Shirley Short 870	Ben Macaulay 456	Neil Dickie (Natural Law) 69	new district
30. Kennebecasis	Peter LeBlanc 3,279	John van Kralingen 2,069	Elizabeth Thompson 1,522	Bob Ross 471		new district
31. Saint John-Fundy	Stuart Jamieson 2,447	Rodney Weston 2,263	Aubrey Fougere 968	Bernard Toole 224	Phyllis Johnston (Natural Law) 49	Stuart Jamieson
32. Saint John-Kings	Laureen Jarrett 3,176	Bill Artiss 2,561	Pam Coates 825		Gary Ewart (Ind.) 497; Allison Pring (Natural Law) 60	new district
33. Saint John Champlain	Roly MacIntyre 2,222	Lisa Keenan 1,547	Paula Tippett 1,888	Christina Green 200		George Jenkins†
34. Saint John Harbour	Robert A. Higgins 1,813	Lloyd Betts 702	**Elizabeth Weir** 2,901	Roland Griffith 137	Janice MacMillan (Natural Law) 52	John Mooney†
34. Saint John Harbour	Robert A. Higgins 1,813	Lloyd Betts 702	**Elizabeth Weir** 2,901	Roland Griffith 137	Janice MacMillan (Natural Law) 52	merged district
34. Saint John Harbour	Robert A. Higgins 1,813	Lloyd Betts 702	**Elizabeth Weir** 2,901	Roland Griffith 137	Janice MacMillan (Natural Law) 52	**Elizabeth Weir**
35. Saint John Portland	Leo McAdam 2,454	Trevor Holder 2,113	Greg Barry 1,507	Terry Van Duzee 209		Leo McAdam
35. Saint John Portland	Leo McAdam 2,454	Trevor Holder 2,113	Greg Barry 1,507	Terry Van Duzee 209		merged district
35. Saint John Portland	Leo McAdam 2,454	Trevor Holder 2,113	Greg Barry 1,507	Terry Van Duzee 209		Shirley Dysart†
36. Saint John Lancaster	Jane Barry 2,954	Norm McFarlane 2,673	Kenneth Wilcox 1,030	Peter Whitebone 215	Richard Gerrior (Ind.) 188; **Christopher Collrin (Natural Law)** 49	Jane Barry
37. Grand Bay-Westfield	Edward Kelly 1,583	Milt Sherwood 2,332	Julie Dingwell 1,471	Colby Fraser 527		new district
38. Charlotte	Sheldon Lee 3,645	Sharon Tucker 1,269	Eugene Dugas 124	Lynn Mason 107	Teresa James (Ind.) 54	Sheldon Lee
38. Charlotte	Sheldon Lee 3,645	Sharon Tucker 1,269	Eugene Dugas 124	Lynn Mason 107	Teresa James (Ind.) 54	merged district
38. Charlotte	Sheldon Lee 3,645	Sharon Tucker 1,269	Eugene Dugas 124	Lynn Mason 107	Teresa James (Ind.) 54	Eric Allaby
39. Fundy Isles	Eric Allaby* 1,201	Bob Jackson 1,111	Bill Barteau 77	John Cunningham 171		new district
40. Western Charlotte	Ann Breault 3,076	Ken Stevens 1,752	John Alexander 257	Tony Huntjens 1,590		Reid Hurley†
40. Western Charlotte	Ann Breault 3,076	Ken Stevens 1,752	John Alexander 257	Tony Huntjens 1,590		merged district
40. Western Charlotte	Ann Breault 3,076	Ken Stevens 1,752	John Alexander 257	Tony Huntjens 1,590		Ann Breault

=== Greater Fredericton ===
Electoral district	Candidates					Incumbent
Electoral district	Liberal	PC	NDP	CoR	Other	Incumbent
41. Oromocto-Gagetown	Vaughn Blaney* 3,537	Jody Carr 1,861	Sandra Burtt 390	Ab Rector 914		Ab Rector
42. Grand Lake	Doug Tyler* 3,743	Stephen McCready 2,177	Danny Young 420	Connie Webber 1,501		new district
43. Fredericton North	Jim Wilson 4,235	Walter Brown 1,778	Elaine Perkins 1,074	Ross Ingram 1,569		Ed Allen†
44. Fredericton-Fort Nashwaak	Greg Byrne 3,241	Brent Bishop 1,464	Patricia Kennedy 929	Nancy Curtis 857		new district
45. Fredericton South	Russ King 4,141	David Peterson 1,980	Dick Grant 1,042	Dave O'Brien 776	Jeanne Geldart (Natural Law) 108	Russ King
46. New Maryland	Joan Kingston 3,719	Robert Penney 1,759	Eric Keating 636	Max White* 1,873		new district
47. York	John Flynn 3,632	Martin MacMullin 1,815	Mary van Gaal 546	Stephen Little 1,350	Patricia Carlson (Natural Law) 56	Danny Cameron†
48. Mactaquac	David Olmstead 3,106	Donald Parent 2,131	Thomas Steep 505	**Greg Hargrove** 1,755		**Greg Hargrove**

=== Upper Saint John River Valley ===
Electoral district	Candidates				Incumbent
Electoral district	Liberal	PC	NDP	Other	Incumbent
49. Woodstock	Bruce Smith 3,306	Fred Hanson 3,058	David Kennedy 530	Lynn Avery (CoR) 687	Bruce Smith
50. Carleton	Butch Green 3,216	Dale Graham 4,016	Deanna Grant 220	David Kilcollins (CoR) 438	Allison DeLong†
50. Carleton	Butch Green 3,216	Dale Graham 4,016	Deanna Grant 220	David Kilcollins (CoR) 438	merged district
50. Carleton	Butch Green 3,216	Dale Graham 4,016	Deanna Grant 220	David Kilcollins (CoR) 438	Dale Graham
51. Victoria-Tobique	Larry Kennedy 2,845	Greg Inman 2,838	Leslie Ferguson 114	Kevin Jensen (CoR) 592; Carter Edgar (Ind.) 109	Larry Kennedy
52. Grand Falls Region	Paul Duffie 4,583	Jean-Guy Laforest 2,301	André Faust 264		Paul Duffie
53. Madawaska-la-Vallée	Gérald Clavette 2,908	Percy Mockler 3,964	Jean-Marie St. Onge 118		Gérald Clavette
53. Madawaska-la-Vallée	Gérald Clavette 2,908	Percy Mockler 3,964	Jean-Marie St. Onge 118		merged district
53. Madawaska-la-Vallée	Gérald Clavette 2,908	Percy Mockler 3,964	Jean-Marie St. Onge 118		Percy Mockler
54. Edmundston	Roland Beaulieu 2,803	**Bernard Valcourt** 4,215	Maureen Michaud 102		Roland Beaulieu
55. Madawaska-les-Lacs	Georges Corriveau 3,085	Jeannot Volpé 4,060	John Nowlan 103		Georges Corriveau
