= York (provincial electoral district, 1995–2014) =

Defunct provincial electoral district in New Brunswick, Canada

Coordinates: 45.677°N 67.105°W

New Brunswick electoral district
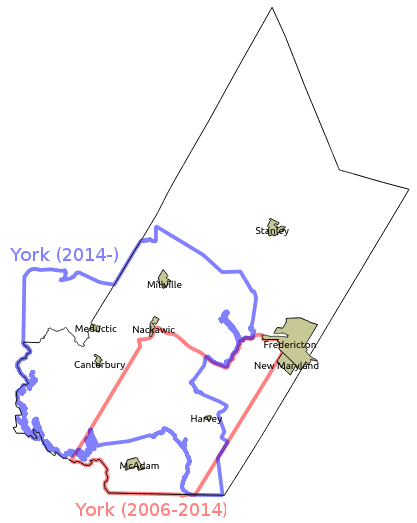
- The electoral district of defunct York (red) and new district of Carleton-York (blue) that succeeded it, as they relate to York County and its municipalities

Defunct provincial electoral district
- Legislature: Legislative Assembly of New Brunswick
- District created: 1994
- District abolished: 2013
- First contested: 1995
- Last contested: 2010

Demographics
- Population (2006): 12,723

York was a provincial electoral district for the Legislative Assembly of New Brunswick, Canada, in the southwestern portion of the province. It was created in 1995 from a large part of the former York South and a small part of York North.

== Members of the Legislative Assembly ==
Assembly	Years	Member	Party
Riding created from York South and York North
53rd	1995–1999	John Flynn	Liberal
54th	1999–2003	Donald Kinney	Progressive Conservative
55th	2003–2006	Scott Targett	Liberal
56th	2006–2010	Carl Urquhart	Progressive Conservative
57th	2010–2014	Carl Urquhart	Progressive Conservative
Riding dissolved into Fredericton West-Hanwell, Charlotte-Campobello and Carleton-York

== Election results ==
2010 New Brunswick general election
Party	Candidate	Votes	%	±%
Progressive Conservative	Carl Urquhart	3,576	56.18	+7.93
Liberal	Winston Gamblin	1,433	22.51	-23.30
New Democratic	Sharon Scott-Levesque	998	15.68	+9.73
Green	Jean Louis Deveau	358	5.62	–
Total valid votes		6,365	100.0	
Total rejected ballots		17	0.27	
Turnout		6,382	71.69	
Eligible voters		8,902		
Progressive Conservative hold		Swing		+15.62

2006 New Brunswick general election
Party	Candidate	Votes	%	±%
Progressive Conservative	Carl Urquhart	3,100	48.25	+5.56
Liberal	Trent Jewett	2,943	45.81	-3.45
New Democratic	Derek Simon	382	5.95	-2.10
Total valid votes		6,425	100.0	
Progressive Conservative gain from Liberal		Swing		+4.50

2003 New Brunswick general election
Party	Candidate	Votes	%	±%
Liberal	Scott Targett	3,783	49.26	+5.54
Progressive Conservative	Don Kinney	3,278	42.69	-7.38
New Democratic	Gary Hughes	618	8.05	+2.86
Total valid votes		7,679	100.0	
Liberal gain from Progressive Conservative		Swing		+6.46

1999 New Brunswick general election
Party	Candidate	Votes	%	±%
Progressive Conservative	Don Kinney	4,332	50.07	+25.54
Liberal	John Flynn	3,783	43.72	-5.37
New Democratic	Josh Johnson	449	5.19	-2.19
Confederation of Regions	Malcolm MacNeil	88	1.02	-17.23
Total valid votes		8,652	100.0	
Progressive Conservative gain from Liberal		Swing		+15.46

1995 New Brunswick general election
Party	Candidate	Votes	%	±%
Liberal	John Flynn	3,632	49.09	
Progressive Conservative	Martin MacMullin	1,815	24.53	
Confederation of Regions	Stephen Little	1,350	18.25	
New Democratic	Mary van Gaal	546	7.38	
Natural Law	Patricia Carlson	56	0.76	
Total valid votes		7,399	100.0	
Liberal notional gain		Swing		

== See also ==
- List of New Brunswick provincial electoral districts
- Canadian provincial electoral districts
