= Donald Arseneault =

Canadian politician

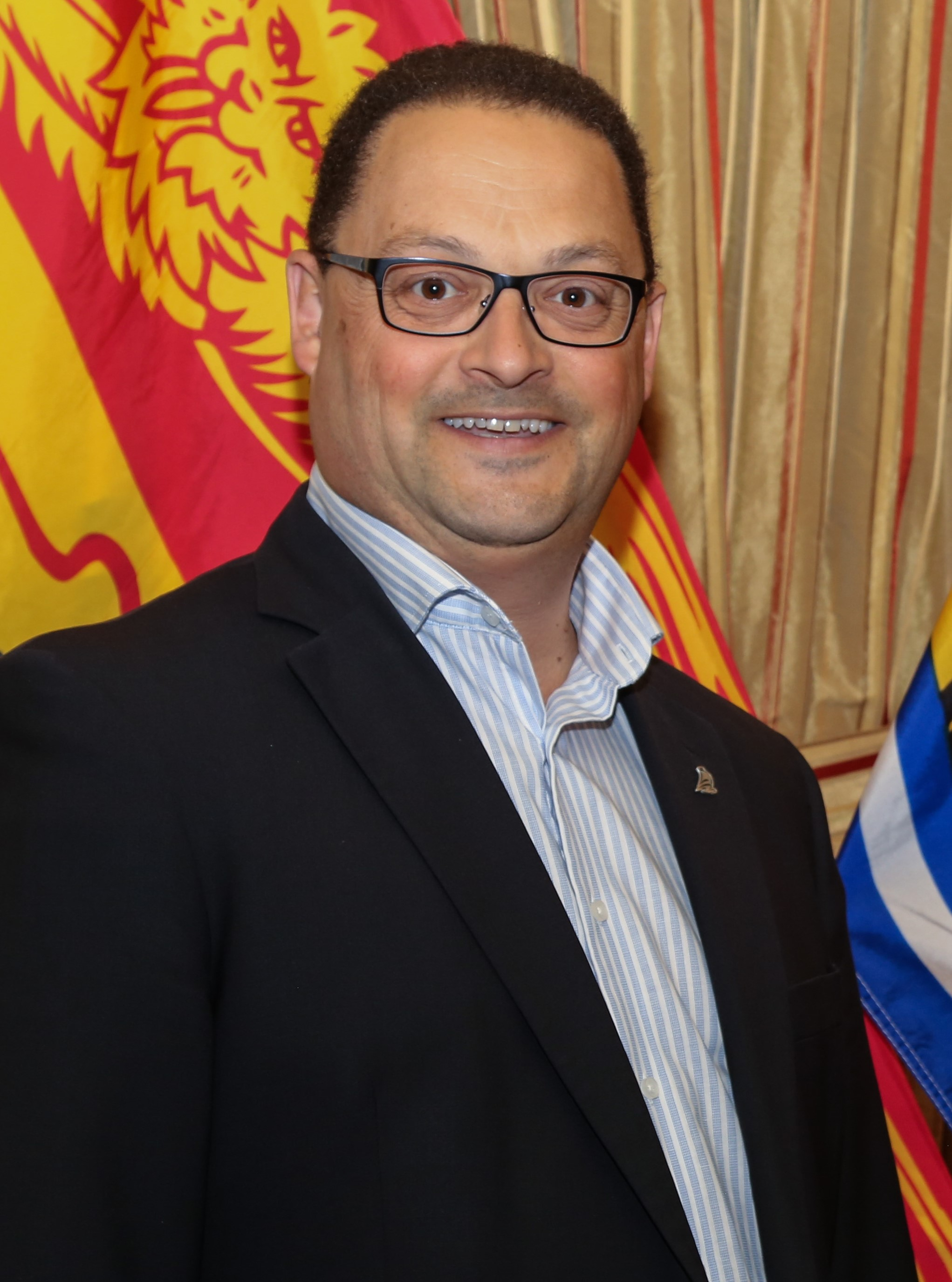
- Arsenault in 2017

Member of the New Brunswick Legislative Assembly for Campbellton-Dalhousie Dalhousie-Restigouche East (2003-2014)
- In office June 9, 2003 – November 30, 2017
- Preceded by: Dennis Furlong
- Succeeded by: Guy Arseneault

Personal details
- Born: January 4, 1974 (age 52) Dalhousie, New Brunswick
- Party: Liberal

Donald Arseneault (born in Dalhousie, New Brunswick) is a New Brunswick politician. He is the former Liberal member of the Legislative Assembly of New Brunswick for the riding of Dalhousie-Restigouche East.

At the time one of the youngest members of the legislature, Arseneault worked in the civil service before being elected in the 2003 election. He was named to the opposition shadow cabinet following the election as critic for both the Office of Human Resources and the Department of Intergovernmental and International Relations. He was elected caucus chair in 2004 and was shuffled to be critic for tourism in early 2005.

He was re-elected in 2006 and his party formed the government and he became Minister of Natural Resources. He also chairs a cabinet committee on forestry issues consisting of fellow ministers Victor Boudreau, Greg Byrne and Jack Keir. On 12 November 2008, he became minister of post-secondary education, training and labour.

In the Brian Gallant government, which won the 2014 New Brunswick general election, he was named the Minister of Energy and Mines.

After being shuffled out of Cabinet on September 5, 2017, Arseneault came under fire a month later when he accepted the government relations manager for Canada's Building Trades Unions and announced he would simultaneously hold his seat as a Member of the Legislative Assembly. Although he was cleared by Integrity commissioner Alexandre Deschênes, who warned him that while there were things he should avoid doing whilst holding the job, nothing in the law prevented him from taking it. As a result of the controversy and given an ultimatum by Premier Brian Gallant, Arseneault announced he would resign as an MLA, effective November 30, 2017.

Aresenault served as campaign manager to Kevin Vickers' Liberal campaign during the 2020 General election. Vickers resigned after the Liberals were reduced to 17 seats from 20. Subsequently he announced on the 28th of October, 2021 that he was going to enter the 2022 Liberal Leadership Election to succeed Vickers.

== Sources ==
- Derwin Gowan, Cabinet committee will tackle forestry issues, Telegraph-Journal. Page A2, October 12, 2006.

New Brunswick provincial government of Brian Gallant
Cabinet posts (3)
Predecessor	Office	Successor
Francine Landry	Minister of Post-Secondary Education, Training and Labour; June 6, 2016 – September 5, 2017	Roger Melanson (Post-Secondary Education); Gilles LePage (Labour, Employment and Population Growth)
Brian Gallant	Minister of Intergovernmental Affairs; June 6, 2016 – September 5, 2017	Bill Fraser
Craig Leonard	Minister of Energy and Mines; October 7, 2014 – June 6, 2016	Rick Doucet
Special Cabinet Responsibilities
Predecessor	Title	Successor
unknown	Minister responsible for Official Languages; October 7, 2014 – September 5, 2017	Brian Kenny
New Brunswick provincial government of Shawn Graham
Cabinet posts (2)
Predecessor	Office	Successor
Ed Doherty	Minister of Post-Secondary Education, Training and Labour; November 12, 2008 – October 12, 2010	Martine Coulombe
Keith Ashfield	Minister of Natural Resources; October 3, 2006 – November 12, 2008	Wally Stiles
Special Cabinet Responsibilities
Predecessor	Title	Successor
Dale Graham	Deputy Premier of New Brunswick; May 10, 2010 – October 12, 2010	Paul Robichaud
Roland Haché	Minister responsible for the Northern New Brunswick Initiative; 2009 – October 12, 2010	none

Preceded by Scott Targett	Chair of the Liberal caucus 2004–2006	Succeeded by Rick Miles
