= Carleton (New Brunswick provincial electoral district, 1995–2014) =

Defunct provincial electoral district in New Brunswick, Canada

New Brunswick electoral district
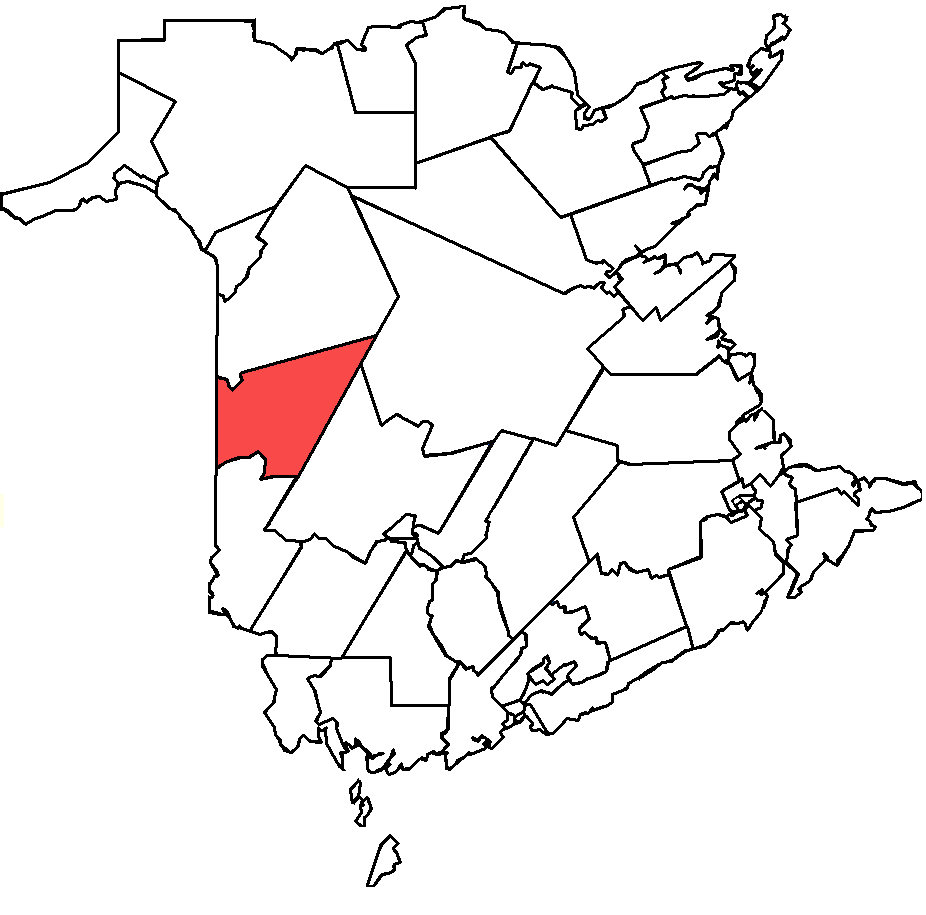
- Coordinates: 46.420°N 67.511°W

Defunct provincial electoral district
- Legislature: Legislative Assembly of New Brunswick
- District created: 1994
- District abolished: 2013
- First contested: 1995
- Last contested: 2010

Demographics
- Population (2006): 13,674

Carleton was a provincial electoral district for the Legislative Assembly of New Brunswick, Canada.

This district contained most of northern portions of Carleton. It was created in the 1994 electoral redistribution out of Carleton North and most of Carleton Centre. It was considered one of the safest seats in the province for the Progressive Conservatives, having elected a representative of that party since its creation, including in the 1995 election when the PCs won only 6 of 55 seats.

The district was slightly altered in the 2006 redistribution when it lost small amounts of territory to the Victoria-Tobique district.

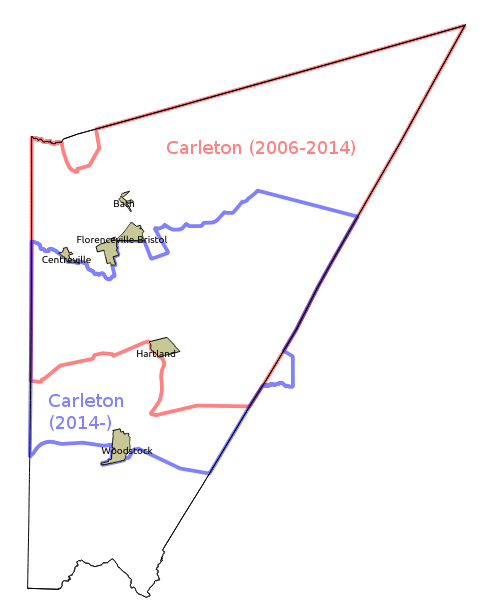
The electoral districts of Carleton (2006–2014) and Carleton (2014–) as they relate to Carleton County and its municipalities.

The district was abolished in the 2013 redistribution. However, a new substantially different district named Carleton was created using less than half of its population and a majority of the population of the old Woodstock district.

It was held by Dale Graham of the New Brunswick Progressive Conservative Party since its creation.

== Members of the Legislative Assembly ==
| Assembly | Years | Member | Party |
|---|---|---|---|
Riding created from Carleton North and Carleton Centre
| 53rd | 1995–1999 | Dale Graham | Progressive Conservative |
| 54th | 1999–2003 | Dale Graham | Progressive Conservative |
| 55th | 2003–2006 | Dale Graham | Progressive Conservative |
| 56th | 2006–2010 | Dale Graham | Progressive Conservative |
| 57th | 2010–2014 | Dale Graham | Progressive Conservative |
Riding dissolved into Carleton-Victoria and Carleton (2014–)

== Election results ==
2010 New Brunswick general election
| Party | Candidate | Votes | % | ±% |
|---|---|---|---|---|
| Progressive Conservative | Dale Graham | 3,885 | 61.76 | -2.37 |
| Liberal | Peter Cook | 1,709 | 27.17 | -5.06 |
| Green | Tegan Wong-Daugherty | 380 | 6.04 | – |
| New Democratic | Jacob Elsinga | 316 | 5.29 | +1.65 |
| Total valid votes | | 6,290 | 100.0 | |
| Total rejected ballots | | 29 | 0.46 | |
| Turnout | | 6,319 | 69.75 | |
| Eligible voters | | 9,059 | | |
| Progressive Conservative hold | | Swing | | +1.34 |

2006 New Brunswick general election
| Party | Candidate | Votes | % | ±% |
|---|---|---|---|---|
| Progressive Conservative | Dale Graham | 4,145 | 64.13 | +3.57 |
| Liberal | Gwen Cullins-Jones | 2,083 | 32.23 | -0.82 |
| New Democratic | Jason Robar | 235 | 3.64 | -2.75 |
| Total valid votes | | 6,463 | 100.0 | |
| Progressive Conservative hold | | Swing | | +2.20 |

2003 New Brunswick general election
| Party | Candidate | Votes | % | ±% |
|---|---|---|---|---|
| Progressive Conservative | Dale Graham | 4,190 | 60.56 | +3.38 |
| Liberal | Grant Robinson | 2,287 | 33.05 | -7.57 |
| New Democratic | Betty Brown | 442 | 6.39 | +4.18 |
| Total valid votes | | 6,919 | 100.0 | |
| Progressive Conservative hold | | Swing | | +5.48 |

1999 New Brunswick general election
| Party | Candidate | Votes | % | ±% |
|---|---|---|---|---|
| Progressive Conservative | Dale Graham | 4,561 | 57.18 | +6.28 |
| Liberal | Grant Robinson | 3,240 | 40.62 | -0.14 |
| New Democratic | Betty Brown | 176 | 2.21 | -0.58 |
| Total valid votes | | 7,977 | 100.0 | |
| Progressive Conservative hold | | Swing | | +3.22 |

1995 New Brunswick general election
| Party | Candidate | Votes | % | ±% |
|---|---|---|---|---|
| Progressive Conservative | Dale Graham | 4,016 | 50.90 | |
| Liberal | Butch Green | 3,216 | 40.76 | |
| Confederation of Regions | David Kilcollins | 438 | 5.55 | |
| New Democratic | Deanna Grant | 220 | 2.79 | |
| Total valid votes | | 7,890 | 100.0 | |
| Progressive Conservative notional gain | | Swing | | |

== Former district ==
A multi-member district, which was also considered a conservative stronghold, existed here prior to 1973. For more information on this district, see Carleton (1834–1974 electoral district).

== See also ==
- List of New Brunswick provincial electoral districts
- Canadian provincial electoral districts
