= Donald Kinney =

Canadian politician (1957–2021)

R. Donald Kinney

Member of the New Brunswick Legislative Assembly for York
- In office 1999–2003
- Preceded by: John Flynn
- Succeeded by: Scott Targett

Personal details
- Born: 5 April 1957 Harvey Station, New Brunswick, Canada
- Died: 4 March 2021 (aged 63) Fredericton, New Brunswick, Canada
- Party: Progressive Conservative

Ralph Donald Kinney (5 April 1957 – 4 March 2021) was a businessman and political figure in New Brunswick, Canada. He represented York in the Legislative Assembly of New Brunswick from 1999 to 2003.

He was born in Harvey Station, New Brunswick, the son of Don Kinney. He worked with Capital Insurance Services Ltd. and then M.S.C. Insurance, later becoming owner of the second company, renamed McAdam Insurance Services Ltd. He died in 2021 from cancer at the age of 63.
