= Miramichi East (electoral district) =

Provincial electoral district in New Brunswick, Canada

New Brunswick electoral district

Provincial electoral district
- Legislature: Legislative Assembly of New Brunswick
MLA
Michelle Conroy
Progressive Conservative
- District created: 2023
- First contested: 2024

Demographics
- Census subdivision(s): Greater Miramichi, Miramichi

Miramichi East (French: Miramichi-Est) is a provincial electoral district for the Legislative Assembly of New Brunswick, Canada. It was created out of parts of Miramichi, Miramichi Bay-Neguac, and parts of Kent North.

== District created ==
It was created in 2023 and was first contested in the 2024 New Brunswick general election. It covers the southern portion of Miramichi, and the eastern portion of Southwest Miramichi-Bay du Vin. The riding covers the southern and eastern portions of Miramichi and the southeastern areas in the Greater Miramichi Rural District.

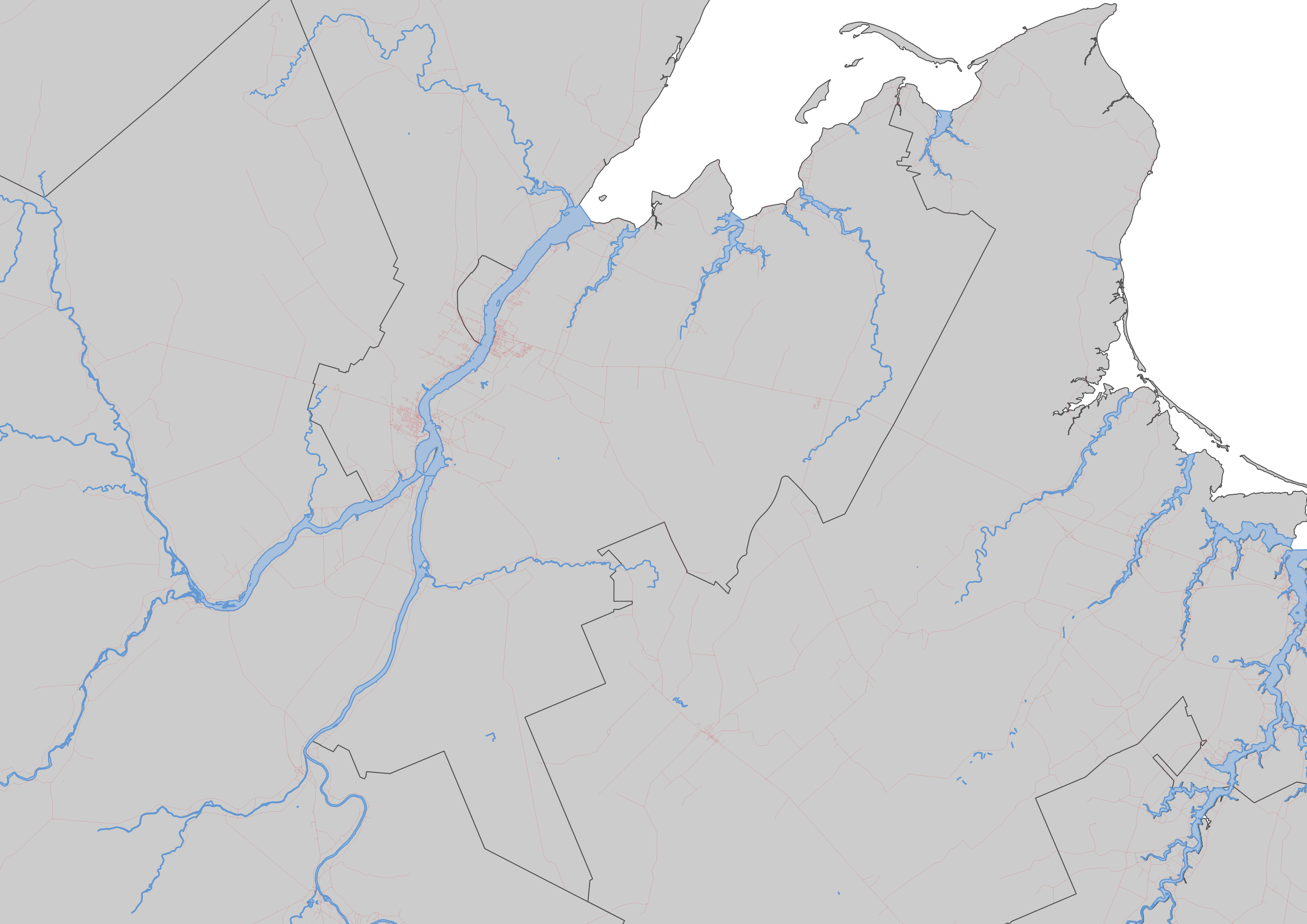
Miramichi East (as it exists from 2023) and the roads in the riding

== Election results ==
2024 New Brunswick general election
Party	Candidate	Votes	%	±%
Progressive Conservative	Michelle Conroy	3,633	50.8%	+23.6
Liberal	Veronique Arsenault	2,921	40.9%	+15.6
Green	Josh Shaddick	355	5.0%	+1.1
People's Alliance	Tom L'Huillier	236	3.3%	-38.0
Total valid votes		7,145		
Total rejected ballots				
Turnout				
Eligible voters				
Source: Elections New Brunswick

2020 provincial election redistributed results
Party	%
People's Alliance	41.3
Progressive Conservative	27.2
Liberal	25.3
Green	3.9
New Democratic Party	1.9

== See also ==
- List of New Brunswick provincial electoral districts
- Canadian provincial electoral districts
