= Kirk MacDonald (politician) =

Canadian politician

Member of the New Brunswick Legislative Assembly for Mactaquac
- In office June 7, 1999 – September 18, 2006
- Preceded by: David Olmstead
- Succeeded by: riding redistributed

Member of the New Brunswick Legislative Assembly for York North
- In office September 18, 2006 – September 22, 2014
- Preceded by: first member
- Succeeded by: riding redistributed

Member of the New Brunswick Legislative Assembly for Fredericton-York
- In office September 22, 2014 – August 23, 2018
- Preceded by: first member
- Succeeded by: Rick DeSaulniers

Dean of the Legislative Assembly of New Brunswick
- In office August 21, 2014 – August 23, 2018 Serving with David Alward (2014 – 2015); Madeleine Dubé (2014 – 2018); Jody Carr; Trevor Holder
- Preceded by: Dale Graham

Personal details
- Born: August 8, 1975 (age 50) Stanley, New Brunswick
- Party: Progressive Conservative
- Occupation: Mill Owner

Kirk Douglas MacDonald is a former politician in the province of New Brunswick, Canada. Born in Stanley, New Brunswick, he earned a Bachelor of Business Administration degree from the University of New Brunswick in 1997. He was elected to the Legislative Assembly of New Brunswick in 1999 and re-elected in 2003, 2006 and 2010 and 2014.

He represented the electoral district of Fredericton-York and was a member of the cabinet as Minister of Business New Brunswick in 2006. He lost re-election in the 2018 election.

New Brunswick provincial government of Bernard Lord
Cabinet post (1)
Predecessor	Office	Successor
Peter Mesheau	Minister of Business New Brunswick; 2006	Greg Byrne
Special Cabinet Responsibilities
Predecessor	Title	Successor
Bernard Lord	Minister responsible for Red Tape Reduction; 2006	Victor Boudreau
