= Scott Targett =

Canadian politician and businessman

Member of the New Brunswick Legislative Assembly for York
- In office 2003–2006
- Preceded by: Donald Kinney
- Succeeded by: Carl Urquhart

Personal details
- Born: New Brunswick, Canada
- Party: Liberal Party of New Brunswick
- Spouse: Rhonda MacDonald
- Children: 3
- Education: University of New Brunswick

Scott Targett is a businessman in the province of New Brunswick, Canada. He is also a former politician having served in the Legislative Assembly of New Brunswick from 2003 to 2006.

A Liberal, he served in the shadow cabinet of Shawn Graham critiquing the ministers of natural resources and later human resources. He was also chair of the Liberal caucus from 2003 to 2004.

Born in rural New Brunswick, Targett was educated at the University of New Brunswick. He married Rhonda MacDonald.

Preceded by Bernard Richard	Chair of the Liberal caucus 2003–2004	Succeeded by Donald Arseneault
