= Miramichi (provincial electoral district) =

Provincial electoral district in New Brunswick, Canada

New Brunswick electoral district
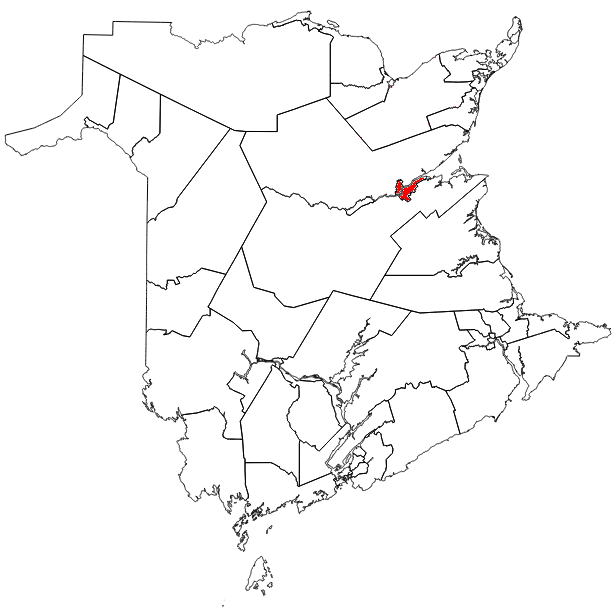
- The riding of Miramichi in relation to other New Brunswick electoral districts.
- Coordinates: 46.996°N 65.501°W

Defunct provincial electoral district
- Legislature: Legislative Assembly of New Brunswick
- District created: 2013
- District abolished: 2023
- First contested: 2014
- Last contested: 2020

Demographics
- Population (2011): 14,200
- Electors (2013): 11,262
- Census division: Northumberland
- Census subdivision: Miramichi (city)

Miramichi was a provincial electoral district for the Legislative Assembly of New Brunswick, Canada. It was contested in the 2014 general election, having been created in the 2013 redistribution of electoral boundaries.

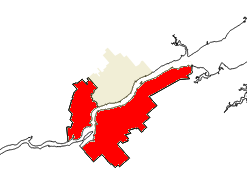
The riding of Miramichi (red) in relation to the balance of the city of Miramichi (gold).

The district comprised mainly the portions of the former ridings of Miramichi Centre and Miramichi-Bay du Vin that fell within the Miramichi city limits, namely the former communities of Newcastle and Chatham. Other parts of the city of Miramichi such as Nordin and Douglastown fall in the Miramichi Bay-Neguac district.

== Members of the Legislative Assembly ==
| Assembly | Years | Member | Party |
|---|---|---|---|
Riding created from Miramichi Centre and Miramichi-Bay du Vin
| 58th | 2014–2018 | Bill Fraser | Liberal |
| 59th | 2018–2020 | Michelle Conroy | People's Alliance |
| 60th | 2020–2022 | Michelle Conroy | People's Alliance |
| 60th | 2022–2024 | Michelle Conroy | Progressive Conservative |
Riding dissolved into Miramichi Bay-Neguac and Miramichi East

== Election results ==
2020 New Brunswick general election
| Party | Candidate | Votes | % | ±% |
|---|---|---|---|---|
| People's Alliance | Michelle Conroy | 3,527 | 45.11 | -1.85 |
| Liberal | Kevin Vickers | 2,239 | 28.64 | -6.38 |
| Progressive Conservative | Charles Barry | 1,508 | 19.29 | +4.98 |
| Green | Joshua Shaddick | 398 | 5.09 | +2.75 |
| New Democratic | Eileen Clancy Teslenko | 92 | 1.18 | -0.19 |
| Independent | Tristan Sutherland | 54 | 0.69 | – |
| Total valid votes | | 7,818 | | |
| Total rejected ballots | | 12 | 0.15 | -0.06 |
| Turnout | | 7,830 | 71.91 | -0.57 |
| Eligible voters | | 10,888 | | |
| People's Alliance hold | | Swing | | +2.27 |
Source: Elections New Brunswick

2018 New Brunswick general election
| Party | Candidate | Votes | % | ±% |
|---|---|---|---|---|
| People's Alliance | Michelle Conroy | 3,788 | 46.96 | – |
| Liberal | Bill Fraser | 2,825 | 35.02 | -14.98 |
| Progressive Conservative | Peggy McLean | 1,154 | 14.31 | -20.20 |
| Green | Louann Savage | 189 | 2.34 | -1.52 |
| New Democratic | Douglas Mullin | 110 | 1.36 | -2.76 |
| Total valid votes | | 8,066 | 99.79 | |
| Total rejected ballots | | 17 | 0.21 | -0.37 |
| Turnout | | 8,083 | 72.48 | |
| Eligible voters | | 11,152 | | |
| People's Alliance gain from Liberal | | Swing | | +30.97 |
Source: Elections New Brunswick

2014 New Brunswick general election
| Party | Candidate | Votes | % |
|---|---|---|---|
| Liberal | Bill Fraser | 3,974 | 50.00 |
| Progressive Conservative | Robert Trevors | 2,743 | 34.51 |
| Independent | Michael "Tanker" Malley | 596 | 7.50 |
| New Democratic | Roger Vautour | 328 | 4.13 |
| Green | Patty Deitch | 307 | 3.86 |
| Total valid votes | | 7,948 | 100.0 |
| Total rejected ballots | | 46 | 0.58 |
| Turnout | | 7,994 | 71.07 |
| Eligible voters | | 11,248 | |
This riding was created from parts of Miramichi Centre and Miramichi-Bay du Vin, which elected a Progressive Conservative and a Liberal, respectively, in the previous election. Bill Fraser was the incumbent from Miramichi-Bay du Vin, and Robert Trevors was the incumbent from Miramichi Centre.
Source: Elections New Brunswick
