= Carl Urquhart =

Canadian politician

Minister of Public Safety
- In office November 9, 2018 – September 14, 2020
- Premier: Blaine Higgs
- Preceded by: Denis Landry (Justice and Public Safety)

Member of the New Brunswick Legislative Assembly for Carleton-York
- In office September 22, 2014 – September 14, 2020
- Preceded by: District created
- Succeeded by: Richard Ames

Member of the New Brunswick Legislative Assembly for York
- In office September 18, 2006 – September 22, 2014
- Preceded by: Scott Targett
- Succeeded by: District abolished

Personal details
- Party: Progressive Conservative

Carl Urquhart is a former politician in the province of New Brunswick, Canada. He was elected to the Legislative Assembly of New Brunswick in the 2006 election as the Progressive Conservative MLA for York. He represented that district until the 2014 election, when he was reelected in the redistributed riding of Carleton-York. Urquhart was re-elected in the 2018 provincial election and served as a Minister under Premier Blaine Higgs. He did not re-offer in the 2020 election.
