= Miramichi-Bay du Vin =

Defunct provincial electoral district in New Brunswick, Canada

New Brunswick electoral district
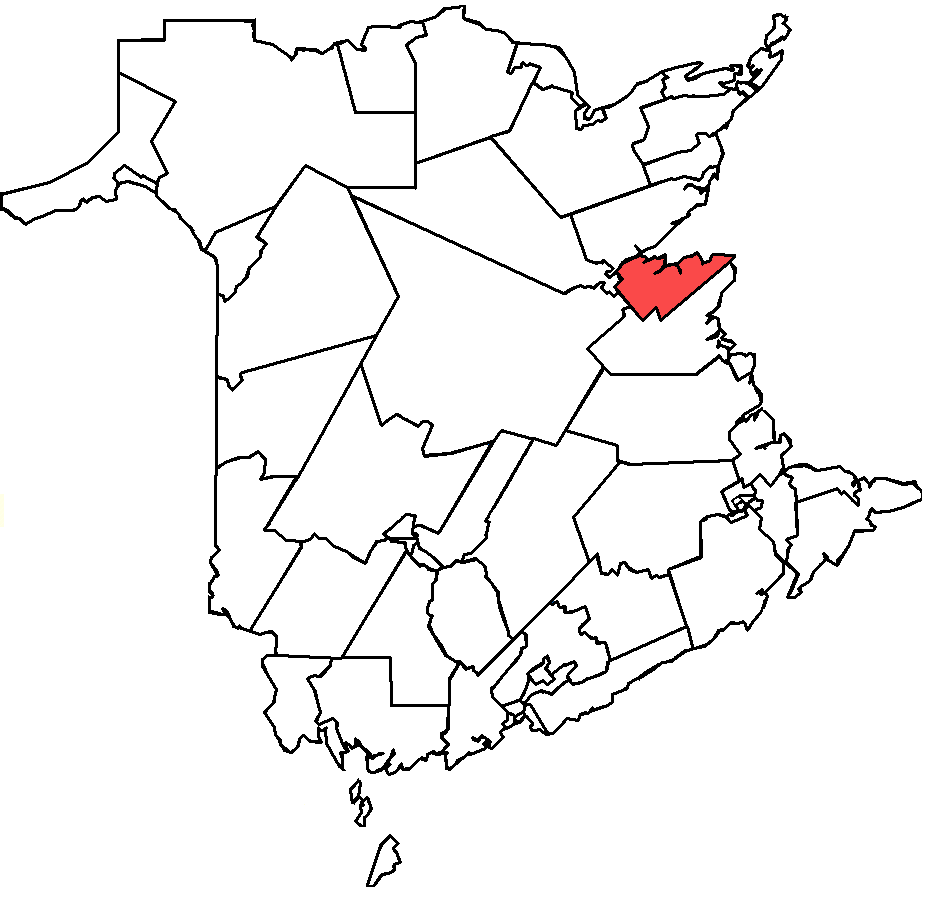
- Miramichi-Bay du Vin in relation to other New Brunswick Provincial electoral districts
- Coordinates: 46.970°N 65.182°W

Defunct provincial electoral district
- Legislature: Legislative Assembly of New Brunswick
- District created: 1994
- District abolished: 2013
- First contested: 1995
- Last contested: 2010

Demographics
- Population (2010): 11,949
- Electors (2010): 8,899

Miramichi-Bay du Vin (French: Miramichi-Baie-du-Vin) was a provincial electoral district for the Legislative Assembly of New Brunswick, Canada.

== Members of the Legislative Assembly ==
Assembly	Years	Member	Party
Riding created from Chatham and Bay du Vin
53rd	1995–1997	Frank McKenna	Liberal
53rd	1997–1999	James Doyle	Liberal
54th	1999–2003	Michael Malley	Progressive Conservative
55th	2003–2006	Michael Malley	Progressive Conservative
55th	2006–2006	Michael Malley	Independent
55th	2006–2006	Michael Malley	Progressive Conservative
56th	2006–2010	Bill Fraser	Liberal
57th	2010–2014	Bill Fraser	Liberal
Riding dissolved into Miramichi and Southwest Miramichi-Bay du Vin

== Election results ==
2010 New Brunswick general election
Party	Candidate	Votes	%	±%
Liberal	Bill Fraser	3,290	49.65	-9.42
Progressive Conservative	Joan Cripps	2,614	39.45	+1.03
New Democratic	Kelly Clancy-King	507	7.65	+5.14
Green	Ronald Mazerolle	215	3.24	–
Total valid votes		6,626	100.0	
Total rejected ballots		85	1.27	
Turnout		6,711	75.41	
Eligible voters		8,899		
Liberal hold		Swing		-5.22

2006 New Brunswick general election
Party	Candidate	Votes	%	±%
Liberal	Bill Fraser	4,171	59.07	+15.06
Progressive Conservative	Michael J. "Tanker" Malley	2,713	38.42	-11.34
New Democratic	Dwayne Hancock	177	2.51	-3.72
Total valid votes		7,061	100.0	
Total rejected ballots		43	0.61	
Turnout		7,104	74.19	
Eligible voters		9,575		
Liberal notional gain from Progressive Conservative		Swing		+13.20

2003 New Brunswick general election
Party	Candidate	Votes	%	±%
Progressive Conservative	Michael Malley	3,917	49.76	-12.83
Liberal	Frank Trevors	3,464	44.01	+8.31
New Democratic	Dwayne Hancock	490	6.23	+4.52
Total valid votes		7,871	100.0	
Progressive Conservative hold		Swing		-10.57

1999 New Brunswick general election
Party	Candidate	Votes	%	±%
Progressive Conservative	Michael Malley	5,393	62.59	+28.11
Liberal	James Doyle	3,076	35.70	-12.58
New Democratic	John Gagnon	147	1.71	-15.54
Total valid votes		8,616	100.0	
Progressive Conservative gain		Swing		+20.34

New Brunswick provincial by-election, 1997
Party	Candidate	Votes	%	±%
Liberal	James Doyle	3,387	48.28	-16.04
Progressive Conservative	Jerry Donahue	2,419	34.48	+7.76
New Democratic	Debbie McGraw	1,210	17.25	+9.45
Total valid votes		7,016	100.0	
Liberal hold		Swing		-11.90

1995 New Brunswick general election
Party	Candidate	Votes	%	±%
Liberal	Frank McKenna	5,089	64.32	
Progressive Conservative	Scott Hickey	2,114	26.72	
New Democratic	Debbie McGraw	617	7.80	
Natural Law	Brian E. Farrah	92	1.16	
Total valid votes		7,912	100.0	
Liberal notional hold		Swing		

== See also ==
- List of New Brunswick provincial electoral districts
- Canadian provincial electoral districts
