= Charles Gallagher (New Brunswick politician) =

Canadian politician

Member of the Legislative Assembly of New Brunswick for Carleton North
- In office 1970–1987

New Brunswick Minister of Education
- In office 1976–1982

New Brunswick Minister of Health
- In office 1982–1985

Speaker of the New Brunswick Legislative Assembly
- In office 1985–1987

Personal details
- Born: September 21, 1925 Centreville, New Brunswick
- Died: June 20, 2007 (aged 81) Saint John, New Brunswick
- Party: 9

Charles Gunter Gallagher (September 21, 1925 – June 20, 2007) was a farmer and political figure in New Brunswick, Canada. He represented Carleton County and then Carleton North in the Legislative Assembly of New Brunswick as a Progressive Conservative member from 1970 to 1987.

He was born in Centreville, New Brunswick, the son of James Isaac Gallagher and May Irene Gunter. Gallagher was educated at the Nova Scotia Agricultural College, Macdonald College and McGill University. In 1948, he married Kathleen Frances Olmstead. Gallagher was speaker for the provincial assembly from 1985 to 1987. He served in the province's Executive Council as Minister of Education from 1976 to 1982 and Minister of Health from 1982 to 1985. Gallagher was defeated by Fred Harvey when he ran for reelection in 1987. From 1991 to 1993, he was a member of a Commission examining Rural Land Use and Environmental Concerns in the province. In 2007, he died at Saint John.
