= Fred Harvey (politician) =

Canadian politician

MLA for Carleton North
- In office 1987–1993
- Preceded by: Charles Gallagher
- Succeeded by: Dale Graham

Personal details
- Born: November 11, 1942 (age 83) Argyle, New Brunswick
- Party: New Brunswick Liberal Association

B. Fred Harvey (born November 11, 1942) is a former Canadian politician. He served in the Legislative Assembly of New Brunswick from 1987 to 1993 as a Liberal member for the constituency of Carleton North.
