= Eric Kipping =

Canadian politician

MLA for Saint John North
- In office 1978–1987
- Preceded by: Shirley Dysart
- Succeeded by: Leo McAdam

Personal details
- Born: March 16, 1925 Glace Bay, Nova Scotia
- Died: October 24, 2017 (aged 92)
- Party: Progressive Conservative Party of New Brunswick

Eric John Kipping (March 16, 1925 – October 24, 2017) was a Canadian politician. He served in the Legislative Assembly of New Brunswick from 1978 to 1987, as a Progressive Conservative member for the constituency of Saint John North.
