= Dalhousie-Restigouche East =

Defunct provincial electoral district in New Brunswick, Canada

New Brunswick electoral district
- Coordinates: 47.887°N 66.381°W

Defunct provincial electoral district
- Legislature: Legislative Assembly of New Brunswick
- District created: 1995
- First contested: 1995
- Last contested: 2010

Demographics
- Population (2006): 14,109
- Electors (2010): 10,309

Dalhousie-Restigouche East (French: Dalhousie-Restigouche-est) was a provincial electoral district for the Legislative Assembly of New Brunswick, Canada.

== Members of the Legislative Assembly ==
| Assembly | Years | Member | Party |
|---|---|---|---|
Riding created from Dalhousie and Restigouche East
| 53rd | 1995–1999 | Carolle de Ste. Croix | Liberal |
| 54th | 1999–2003 | Dennis Furlong | Progressive Conservative |
| 55th | 2003–2006 | Donald Arseneault | Liberal |
| 56th | 2006–2010 | Donald Arseneault | Liberal |
| 57th | 2010–2014 | Donald Arseneault | Liberal |
Riding dissolved into Campbellton-Dalhousie, Restigouche West and Restigouche-Chaleur

== Election results ==
2010 New Brunswick general election
| Party | Candidate | Votes | % | ±% |
|---|---|---|---|---|
| Liberal | Donald Arseneault | 3,634 | 46.34 | -22.12 |
| Progressive Conservative | Joseph Elias | 2,629 | 33.52 | +7.63 |
| New Democratic | Ray Godin | 1,406 | 17.93 | +12.28 |
| Green | Susan Smissaert | 173 | 2.21 | – |
| Total valid votes | | 7,842 | 100.0 | |
| Total rejected ballots | | 86 | 1.08 | |
| Turnout | | 7,928 | 76.90 | |
| Eligible voters | | 10,309 | | |
| Liberal hold | | Swing | | -14.88 |

2006 New Brunswick general election
| Party | Candidate | Votes | % | ±% |
|---|---|---|---|---|
| Liberal | Donald Arseneault | 5,502 | 68.46 | +20.47 |
| Progressive Conservative | Ronald Joseph Barriault | 2,081 | 25.89 | -17.13 |
| New Democratic | Lyndsey Gallant | 454 | 5.65 | -3.33 |
| Total valid votes | | 8,037 | 100.0 | |
| Total rejected ballots | | 143 | 1.75 | |
| Turnout | | 8,180 | 73.39 | |
| Eligible voters | | 11,146 | | |
| Liberal notional hold | | Swing | | +18.80 |

2003 New Brunswick general election
| Party | Candidate | Votes | % | ±% |
|---|---|---|---|---|
| Liberal | Donald Arseneault | 3,445 | 47.99 | +13.34 |
| Progressive Conservative | Paul Emile McIntyre | 3,088 | 43.02 | -20.01 |
| New Democratic | Joel William Hickey | 645 | 8.98 | +6.65 |
| Total valid votes | | 7,178 | 100.0 | |
| Liberal gain from Progressive Conservative | | Swing | | +16.68 |

1999 New Brunswick general election
| Party | Candidate | Votes | % | ±% |
|---|---|---|---|---|
| Progressive Conservative | Dennis Furlong | 5,148 | 63.03 | +53.51 |
| Liberal | Carolle de Ste. Croix | 2,830 | 34.65 | -16.69 |
| New Democratic | Joel William Hickey | 190 | 2.33 | -32.95 |
| Natural Law | Francine Richard | 0 | 0.00 | -1.04 |
| Total valid votes | | 8,168 | 100.0 | |
| Progressive Conservative gain from Liberal | | Swing | | +35.10 |

1995 New Brunswick general election
| Party | Candidate | Votes | % | ±% |
|---|---|---|---|---|
| Liberal | Carolle de Ste. Croix | 4,006 | 51.34 | |
| New Democratic | Aurèle Ferlatte | 2,753 | 35.28 | |
| Progressive Conservative | Gail Walsh | 743 | 9.52 | |
| Independent | Charles Gendron Stewart | 220 | 2.82 | |
| Natural Law | Chris Jensen | 81 | 1.04 | |
| Total valid votes | | 7,803 | 100.0 | |
| Liberal notional gain | | Swing | | |

== See also ==
- List of New Brunswick provincial electoral districts
- Canadian provincial electoral districts
