= David Bishop (Canadian politician) =

Canadian politician

MLA for York North
- In office 1974–1987
- Succeeded by: Robert B. Simpson

Personal details
- Born: David Crouse; March 15, 1942 Woodstock, New Brunswick
- Died: July 8, 2017 (aged 75) Fredericton, New Brunswick
- Party: Progressive Conservative Party of New Brunswick
- Occupation: clergyman

Adelbert David Bishop (March 15, 1942 – July 8, 2017) was a Canadian politician. He served in the Legislative Assembly of New Brunswick from 1974 to 1987, as a Progressive Conservative member for the constituency of York North. He died in 2017.
