= Carleton North (electoral district) =

Defunct provincial electoral district in New Brunswick, Canada

New Brunswick electoral district
- Coordinates: 46.484°N 67.589°W

Defunct provincial electoral district
- Legislature: Legislative Assembly of New Brunswick
- District created: 1973
- District abolished: 1994
- First contested: 1974
- Last contested: 1991

Demographics
- Electors (1991): 6,001

Carleton North was a provincial electoral district for the Legislative Assembly of New Brunswick, Canada.

This district contained the northern third of Carleton County, including the municipalities of Bath, Bristol, Centreville, and Florenceville.

From 1974 to 1987 the seat was represented by Progressive Conservative Charles Gallagher who served as a senior cabinet minister until 1985 before becoming speaker of the legislature.

In 1987, Liberal Fred Harvey was elected in a landslide which saw the Liberals win every seat in the legislature. Harvey was narrowly re-elected in 1991 but was expelled from the legislature in 1993 for violations of the Elections Act.

Dale Graham, a Progressive Conservative, was elected in a 1993 by-election. Graham was re-elected five times in the successor district of Carleton and serve as deputy premier and speaker.

== Members of the Legislative Assembly ==
Assembly	Years	Member	Party
Riding created from Carleton (1834–1974)
48th	1974–1978	Charles Gallagher	Progressive Conservative
49th	1978–1982	Charles Gallagher	Progressive Conservative
50th	1982–1987	Charles Gallagher	Progressive Conservative
51st	1987–1991	Fred Harvey	Liberal
52nd	1991–1993	Fred Harvey	Liberal
52nd	1993–1995	Dale Graham	Progressive Conservative
Riding dissolved into Carleton (1995–2014)

== Election results ==
New Brunswick provincial by-election, 28 June 1993
Party	Candidate	Votes	%	±%
Progressive Conservative	Dale Graham	2,365	50.20	+10.64
Liberal	Dean Rupert Crabbe	1,534	32.56	-9.55
Confederation of Regions	Phil Dunbar	770	16.34	-0.35
New Democratic	Anna Marie Kilfoil	42	0.89	-0.75
Total valid votes		4,711	100.0	
Progressive Conservative gain from Liberal		Swing		+10.10

1991 New Brunswick general election
Party	Candidate	Votes	%	±%
Liberal	Fred Harvey	2,163	42.11	-13.10
Progressive Conservative	Dale Graham	2,032	39.56	-0.77
Confederation of Regions	Jack Salmon	857	16.69	–
New Democratic	Anna Marie Kilfoil	84	1.64	-2.82
Total valid votes		5,136	100.0	
Liberal hold		Swing		-6.16

1987 New Brunswick general election
Party	Candidate	Votes	%	±%
Liberal	B. Fred Harvey	2,687	55.21	+13.68
Progressive Conservative	Charles G. Gallagher	1,963	40.33	-12.37
New Democratic	Anna Marie Kilfoil	217	4.46	-1.32
Total valid votes		4,867	100.0	
Liberal gain from Progressive Conservative		Swing		+13.02

1982 New Brunswick general election
Party	Candidate	Votes	%	±%
Progressive Conservative	Charles G. Gallagher	2,189	52.70	-5.89
Liberal	Robert D. MacElwain	1,725	41.53	+0.12
New Democratic	Larry Lamont	240	5.78	–
Total valid votes		4,154	100.0	
Progressive Conservative hold		Swing		-3.00

1978 New Brunswick general election
Party	Candidate	Votes	%	±%
Progressive Conservative	Charles G. Gallagher	2,397	58.59	+3.91
Liberal	Samuel J. "Sam" Perkins	1,694	41.41	-3.91
Total valid votes		4,091	100.0	
Progressive Conservative hold		Swing		+3.91

1974 New Brunswick general election
Party	Candidate	Votes	%
Progressive Conservative	Charles G. Gallagher	2,238	54.68
Liberal	Robert A. White	1,855	45.32
Total valid votes		4,093	100.0
The previous multi-member riding of Carleton went totally Progressive Conservative in the last election, with Charles Gallagher being one of three incumbents.

== See also ==
- List of New Brunswick provincial electoral districts
- Canadian provincial electoral districts
