= George E. Horton =

Canadian politician

Member of the Legislative Assembly of New Brunswick
- In office 1962–1978
- Succeeded by: Hazen Myers
- Constituency: Kings (1962–74); Kings East (1974–78)

Personal details
- Born: January 14, 1910 Moncton, New Brunswick
- Died: February 15, 1992 (aged 82) Sussex Corner, New Brunswick
- Party: Progressive Conservative Party of New Brunswick
- Spouse: Alyce Geralidine Steeves
- Children: 3
- Occupation: merchant

George Edgar Horton (January 14, 1910 – February 15, 1992) was a Canadian politician. He served in the Legislative Assembly of New Brunswick from 1962 to 1978 as member of the Progressive Conservative party.
