= Pete Dalton =

Canadian politician

Member of the Legislative Assembly of New Brunswick
- In office 1987–1991
- Preceded by: Hazen Myers
- Succeeded by: Hazen Myers
- Constituency: Kings East

Personal details
- Party: New Brunswick Liberal Association

Pius A. "Pete" Dalton is a former Canadian politician. He served in the Legislative Assembly of New Brunswick from 1987 to 1991 as a Liberal member for the constituency of Kings East.
