= LeRoy Armstrong =

Canadian businessman and politician (1936–2022)

MLA for Kings East
- In office 2003–2006
- Preceded by: Douglas Cosman
- Succeeded by: Bruce Northrup
- In office 1995–1999
- Preceded by: Hazen Myers
- Succeeded by: Douglas Cosman

Personal details
- Born: 31 December 1936 Searsville, New Brunswick
- Died: 27 April 2022 (aged 85) Saint John, New Brunswick
- Party: New Brunswick Liberal Association
- Profession: Businessman

Thomas LeRoy Armstrong (31 December 1936 – 27 April 2022) was a Canadian businessman and politician. He was the member of the Legislative Assembly of New Brunswick for the riding of Kings East.

Armstrong was born in Searsville, New Brunswick. In his youth he worked in the forestry, rail and grocery businesses before moving to Apohaqui, New Brunswick in 1965 and founding a trucking operation, which he merged into a larger operation in 1985 called Kingsco. Kingsco is still an active business of which Armstrong was a part.

A Liberal, he was first elected to the legislature in the 1995 election but was defeated in the 1999 election which saw the Liberals lose 35 seats to the Progressive Conservatives.

Armstrong was re-elected in 2003 and served for the duration of the 55th New Brunswick Legislative Assembly as opposition critic for agriculture. He was defeated in his bid for re-election in the 2006 election.

Armstrong also served as chairman of The Concerned Citizens Group. He died on 27 April 2022, at the Saint John Regional Hospital at the age of 85.
