= Saint John North =

Defunct provincial electoral district in New Brunswick, Canada

New Brunswick electoral district

Defunct provincial electoral district
- Legislature: Legislative Assembly of New Brunswick
- District created: 1973
- District abolished: 1994
- First contested: 1974
- Last contested: 1991

Saint John North was a provincial electoral district in New Brunswick, Canada. It was created from the multi-member riding of Saint John Centre in the 1973 electoral redistribution, and was abolished in the 1994 electoral redistribution.

== Members of the Legislative Assembly ==
Assembly	Years	Member	Party
Riding created from Saint John Centre
48th	1974–1978	Shirley Dysart	Liberal
49th	1978–1982	Eric Kipping	Progressive Conservative
50th	1982–1987	Eric Kipping	Progressive Conservative
51st	1987–1991	Leo McAdam	Liberal
52nd	1991–1995	Leo McAdam	Liberal
Riding dissolved into Saint John Portland

== Election results ==
1991 New Brunswick general election
Party	Candidate	Votes	%	±%
Liberal	Leo McAdam	1,892	38.64	-17.89
Progressive Conservative	Doug Shippee	1,089	22.24	-1.68
New Democratic	Julie Galbraith	966	19.73	+0.18
Confederation of Regions	Peter A. Whitebone	950	19.40	–
Total valid votes		4,897	100.0	
Liberal hold		Swing		-8.10

1987 New Brunswick general election
Party	Candidate	Votes	%	±%
Liberal	Leo A. McAdam	2,753	56.53	+17.91
Progressive Conservative	Eric John Kipping	1,165	23.92	-17.40
New Democratic	Lesley Orill MacLean	952	19.55	-0.51
Total valid votes		4,870	100.0	
Liberal gain from Progressive Conservative		Swing		+17.66

1982 New Brunswick general election
Party	Candidate	Votes	%	±%
Progressive Conservative	Eric J. Kipping	2,223	41.32	-7.49
Liberal	Joseph A. Day	2,078	38.62	-1.56
New Democratic	Erik Kraglund	1,079	20.06	+9.05
Total valid votes		5,380	100.0	
Progressive Conservative hold		Swing		-2.96

1978 New Brunswick general election
Party	Candidate	Votes	%	±%
Progressive Conservative	Eric J. Kipping	1,906	48.81	+0.98
Liberal	Harry G. Colwell	1,569	40.18	-9.27
New Democratic	Henry Thomas Watts	430	11.01	+8.28
Total valid votes		3,905	100.0	
Progressive Conservative gain from Liberal		Swing		+5.12

1974 New Brunswick general election
Party	Candidate	Votes	%
Liberal	Shirley Dysart	2,231	49.45
Progressive Conservative	Hugh John Flemming	2,158	47.83
New Democratic	Keith Parks	123	2.73
Total valid votes		4,512	100.0
The previous multi-member riding of Saint John Centre elected three Progressive Conservatives and one Liberal in the previous election, one of the PC seats was won by a Liberal in a by-election. None of the four incumbents ran in this riding.

== See also ==
- List of New Brunswick provincial electoral districts
- Canadian provincial electoral districts
