= Robert B. Simpson =

Canadian politician

Bob Simpson

MLA for York North
- In office 1987–1991
- Preceded by: David Bishop
- Succeeded by: Greg Hargrove

Personal details
- Born: Robert Blaine Simpson; October 12, 1943 (age 82) Chatham, New Brunswick
- Party: New Brunswick Liberal Association
- Spouse: Rowena Simpson
- Children: Dr. Chris Simpson, Rob Simpson
- Occupation: educator, executive

Robert Blaine Simpson (born October 12, 1943) is a former politician in New Brunswick, Canada.

== Education ==
Robert Simpson was born in Chatham, New Brunswick, on October 12, 1943. He graduated from Chatham High School in 1962 and went on to obtain a BA, BEd, and MEd from the University of New Brunswick.

== Personal life ==
He is married to Rowena Simpson, a former mayor of Nackawic.

== Career ==
He was a teacher, vice principal, and principal in the school systems of Nackawic and Canterbury, NB.

He served as mayor of Nackawic from 1974 to 1983. During this time, the village, formed only in 1968, was formally incorporated as a town (1976). This rapid advancement in municipal status was a feat not accomplished by any municipality in New Brunswick before or since.

He was the founding president of Western New Brunswick Crimestoppers Association and served as the vice president of the Towns of New Brunswick Association. He was also a founding member of the Capital Region Development Corporation.

In 1985, he contested the Liberal nomination for the provincial riding of York North. Six candidates vied for the nomination, and the nomination convention held in Fredericton attracted 2,400 attendees - the largest individual riding nomination meeting in the history of elected politics in New Brunswick. He was elected as the Liberal member for York North in the 1987 electoral sweep by the Liberal Party, winning the seat for the Liberals with a plurality of over 3,500 votes in a traditionally Tory seat. All 58 seats in New Brunswick were captured by Frank McKenna's Liberals in that historic election. Simpson became the first Liberal elected in the riding of York North since 1953.

He distinguished himself in the Legislative Assembly, serving as the Labour advocate and as the co-chair of the Select Committee on the Meech Lake Accord. New Brunswick's stand on the Meech Lake Accord was one of the pivotal moments in the national debate on the Accord, which eventually met its demise following the failure of the Manitoba legislature to ratify it. He also served on the Law Amendments Committee and the Crown Corporations Committee, as well as serving as the Chair of the Economic Policy Development Committee. He was defeated in 1991 by Greg Hargrove, the candidate representing the anti-bilingualism Confederation of Regions Party (CoR), which opposed official bilingualism in New Brunswick. The Confederation of Regions Party won 8 seats in the 1991 election, primarily in the Fredericton area, and formed the Official Opposition.

Simpson went on to serve as chair of the board of the Region 3 Health Corporation (later, River Valley Health) in New Brunswick. From 2001 to 2008, he was the executive director of the New Brunswick Healthcare Association, a federation of the province's eight regional health authorities. From 2008 to 2010, he served as the executive director of the New Brunswick Health Research Foundation, helping to establish a firm footing for funded health research in New Brunswick.

In May, 2016, he was elected as a councillor in Nackawic, NB, winning re-election in 2020. In 2022, he was elected as one of two Ward 3 councillors in the newly formed municipality of Nackawic-Millville Rural Community, a new municipal entity consisting of the former Town of Nackawic, the former Village of Millville, and parts of several surrounding rural communities including Southampton, Dumfries, Queensbury, Temperance Vale, Springfield, Howland Ridge, Hawkins' Corner, and Maple Ridge.

== Awards ==
He was a recipient of the Canada 125 medal in 1992 and the Queen's Golden Jubilee Medal in 2002.
