= Bruce Northrup =

Canadian politician

Bruce Northrup MLA

Minister of Public Safety
- In office 23 September 2013 – 7 October 2014
- Premier: David Alward
- Preceded by: Robert Trevors
- Succeeded by: Stephen Horsman

Minister of Natural Resources
- In office 12 October 2010 – 23 September 2013
- Premier: David Alward
- Preceded by: Wally Stiles
- Succeeded by: Paul Robichaud

Member of the New Brunswick Legislative Assembly for Sussex-Fundy-St. Martins Kings East (2006-2014)
- In office September 18, 2006 – August 17, 2020
- Preceded by: LeRoy Armstrong
- Succeeded by: Tammy Scott-Wallace

Personal details
- Born: 1955 (age 70–71) Sussex, New Brunswick
- Party: Liberal (from 2024)
- Other political affiliations: Progressive Conservative (until 2020)

Bruce N. Northrup (born 1955) is a Canadian politician in the province of New Brunswick. He was elected to the Legislative Assembly of New Brunswick in the 2006 election as the Progressive Conservative MLA for Kings East. Northrup has acted as official Opposition critic for energy and NB Power issues. He acted the critic for Department of Natural Resources interests and the official Opposition whip. He was re-elected in September 2010, and served as the Minister of Natural Resources. Following the 2014 election of the 58th New Brunswick Legislature, he became the Public Safety critic.

In February 2020, Northrup challenged Blaine Higgs' controversial and later cancelled decision to limit access to healthcare in rural areas by closing several rural hospital emergency departments. He announced his leave from provincial politics later that year; he returned to politics in 2024, having switched to the Liberal Association, and announced his intention to seek the Liberal nomination for Sussex-Three Rivers in the 2024 provincial election. He was announced as the Liberal candidate on August 6, 2024.
