= Dennis Furlong =

Canadian politician and physician (1945–2018)

Member of the New Brunswick Legislative Assembly for Dalhousie-Restigouche East
- In office 1999–2003
- Preceded by: Carolle de Ste. Croix
- Succeeded by: Donald Arseneault

Personal details
- Born: July 22, 1945 St. John's, Newfoundland
- Died: March 9, 2018 (aged 72) Campbellton, New Brunswick
- Party: Progressive Conservative Party of New Brunswick
- Education: University of New Brunswick; University of Oregon; Memorial University of Newfoundland
- Profession: physician

Dennis Jerome Furlong (July 22, 1945 – March 9, 2018) was a physician and former political figure in New Brunswick, Canada. He represented Dalhousie-Restigouche East in the Legislative Assembly of New Brunswick from 1999 to 2003. He was a member of the Progressive Conservative Party of New Brunswick.

== Early life ==
He was born in St. John's, Newfoundland and was educated at the University of New Brunswick, the University of Oregon and Memorial University, receiving a M.D. from the latter institution.

== Career ==
Furlong set up practice in Dalhousie, New Brunswick. From 1985 to 1986, he was president of the College of Physicians and Surgeons of New Brunswick and, from 1988 to 1989, he was president of the New Brunswick Medical Society. He served as Minister of Health and Community Services from 1999 to 2000, Minister of Health and Wellness from 2000 to 2001 and Minister of Education from 2001 to 2003. In November 2005, Furlong took over as head of the inquiry into the use of Agent Orange at CFB Gagetown after the resignation of Vaughn Blaney. He was named as the chair of the New Brunswick Trauma System Advisory Committee in October 2007.

== Death ==
Furlong died March 9, 2018.

== Publications ==
- Medicare Myths. 50 myths we've endured about the Canadian health care system. 2004. ISBN 1-894372-39-5

== Notes ==
New Brunswick provincial government of Bernard Lord
Cabinet posts (3)
Predecessor	Office	Successor
Elvy Robichaud	Minister of Education; 2001–2003	Madeleine Dubé
self as Minister of Health and Community Services	Minister of Health and Wellness; 2000–2001	Elvy Robichaud
Ann Breault	Minister of Health and Community Services; 1999–2000	self as Minister of Health and Wellness
