= David Olmstead =

Canadian politician

Member of the New Brunswick Legislative Assembly for Mactaquac
- In office September 11, 1995 – June 7, 1999
- Preceded by: Greg Hargrove
- Succeeded by: Kirk MacDonald

Personal details
- Party: Liberal

David Olmstead is a politician in the province of New Brunswick, Canada He was elected to the Legislative Assembly of New Brunswick in 1995 and defeated for re-election by Kirk MacDonald in 1999.

He represented the electoral district of Mactaquac.
