= Michelle Conroy =

Canadian politician

Michelle Conroy MLA
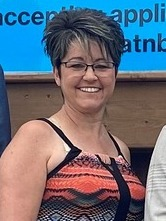
- Conroy in 2024

Member of the New Brunswick Legislative Assembly for Miramichi East (Miramichi, 2018-2024)
- Incumbent
- Assumed office September 24, 2018
- Preceded by: Bill Fraser

Personal details
- Born: Chatham, New Brunswick
- Party: Progressive Conservative Party of New Brunswick
- Other political affiliations: People's Alliance of New Brunswick (2018-2022)
- Occupation: Health Care Administrator

Michelle Conroy is a member of the Progressive Conservative Party of New Brunswick and an MLA in the Legislative Assembly of New Brunswick representing the riding of Miramichi East. From 2018 to 2024, she was the MLA for Miramichi.

Conroy was re-elected in the 2020 provincial election, defeating the Liberal Party Leader Kevin Vickers by more than 1000 votes.

On March 30, 2022, Conroy announced she will be leaving the People's Alliance of New Brunswick to join the Progressive Conservative Party of New Brunswick.

Prior to her election, she worked in health care administration.

== Election results ==
2024 New Brunswick general election: Miramichi East
Party	Candidate	Votes	%	±%
Progressive Conservative	Michelle Conroy	3,633	50.8%	+23.6
Liberal	Veronique Arsenault	2,921	40.9%	+15.6
Green	Josh Shaddick	355	5.0%	+1.1
People's Alliance	Tom L'Huillier	236	3.3%	-38.0
Total valid votes		7,145		
Total rejected ballots		18		
Turnout		7,163	69.7	
Eligible voters		9,991		
Source: Elections New Brunswick

2020 New Brunswick general election
Party	Candidate	Votes	%	±%
People's Alliance	Michelle Conroy	3,527	45.11	-1.85
Liberal	Kevin Vickers	2,239	28.64	-6.38
Progressive Conservative	Charles Barry	1,508	19.29	+4.98
Green	Joshua Shaddick	398	5.09	+2.75
New Democratic	Eileen Clancy Teslenko	92	1.18	-0.19
Independent	Tristan Sutherland	54	0.69	–
Total valid votes		7,818		
Total rejected ballots		12	0.15	-0.06
Turnout		7,830	71.91	-0.57
Eligible voters		10,888		
People's Alliance hold		Swing		+2.27
Source: Elections New Brunswick

2018 New Brunswick general election
Party	Candidate	Votes	%	±%
People's Alliance	Michelle Conroy	3,788	46.96	--
Liberal	Bill Fraser	2,825	35.02	-14.98
Progressive Conservative	Peggy McLean	1,154	14.31	-20.20
Green	Louann Savage	189	2.34	-1.52
New Democratic	Douglas Mullin	110	1.36	-2.76
Total valid votes		8,066	99.79	
Total rejected ballots		17	0.21	-0.37
Turnout		8,083	73.19	+2.12
Eligible voters		11,044		
People's Alliance gain from Liberal		Swing		+30.97
Source: Elections New Brunswick
