= Sussex-Fundy-St. Martins =

Provincial electoral district in New Brunswick, Canada

New Brunswick electoral district
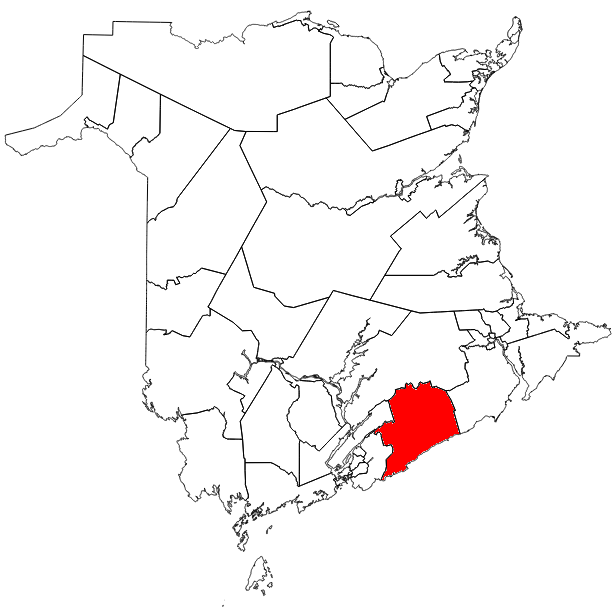
- The riding of Sussex-Fundy-St. Martins in relation to other New Brunswick electoral districts

Defunct provincial electoral district
- Legislature: Legislative Assembly of New Brunswick
- District created: 1973
- District abolished: 2023
- First contested: 1974
- Last contested: 2020

Demographics
- Population (2011): 15,978
- Electors (2013): 11,118
- Census division(s): Kings, Saint John, Albert

Sussex-Fundy-St. Martins was a provincial electoral district for the Legislative Assembly of New Brunswick, Canada. It was created as Kings East in 1973 and was slightly altered in the subsequent redistributions of 1994, 2006 and New Brunswick electoral redistribution, 2013. Its name was changed from Kings East to Sussex-Fundy-St. Martins in the 2013 redistribution, while gaining parts of Hampton-Kings and Saint John-Fundy in the process.

The riding name referred to Sussex Parish, the Bay of Fundy and Fundy-St. Martins.

== Members of the Legislative Assembly ==
Assembly	Years	Member	Party
Kings East; Riding created from Kings
48th	1974–1978	George Horton	Progressive Conservative
49th	1978–1982	Hazen Myers	Progressive Conservative
50th	1982–1987	Hazen Myers	Progressive Conservative
51st	1987–1991	Pete Dalton	Liberal
52nd	1991–1995	Hazen Myers	Progressive Conservative
53rd	1995–1999	LeRoy Armstrong	Liberal
54th	1999–2003	Douglas Cosman	Progressive Conservative
55th	2003–2006	LeRoy Armstrong	Liberal
56th	2006–2010	Bruce Northrup	Progressive Conservative
57th	2010–2014	Bruce Northrup	Progressive Conservative
Sussex-Fundy-St. Martins
58th	2014–2018	Bruce Northrup	Progressive Conservative
59th	2018–2020	Bruce Northrup	Progressive Conservative
60th	2020–2024	Tammy Scott-Wallace	Progressive Conservative
Riding dissolved into Sussex-Three Rivers, Hampton-Fundy-St. Martins, Albert-Riverview, Arcadia-Butternut Valley-Maple Hills and Kings Centre

== Election results ==
=== Sussex-Fundy-St. Martins ===
2020 New Brunswick general election
Party	Candidate	Votes	%	±%
Progressive Conservative	Tammy Scott-Wallace	4,366	56.29	+6.83
People's Alliance	Jim Bedford	1,321	17.03	-7.26
Liberal	Cully Robinson	971	12.52	-3.19
Green	Tim Thompson	969	12.49	+5.95
New Democratic	Jonas Lanz	129	1.66	-1.63
Total valid votes		7,756		
Total rejected ballots		20	0.26	+0.14
Turnout		7,776	64.92	+0.87
Eligible voters		11,978		
Progressive Conservative hold		Swing		+7.04
Source: Elections New Brunswick

2018 New Brunswick general election
Party	Candidate	Votes	%	±%
Progressive Conservative	Bruce Northrup	3,816	49.46	-0.40
People's Alliance	Jim Bedford	1,874	24.29	+13.90
Liberal	Ian Smyth	1,212	15.71	-7.48
Green	Fred Harrison	505	6.55	-1.18
New Democratic	Dawna Robertson	254	3.29	-5.55
Independent	David Raymond Amos	54	0.70	--
Total valid votes		7,715	100.0	
Total rejected ballots		9	0.12	
Turnout		7,724	64.05	
Eligible voters		12,060		
Source: Elections New Brunswick

2014 New Brunswick general election
Party	Candidate	Votes	%	±%
Progressive Conservative	Bruce Northrup	3,677	49.86	-16.87
Liberal	Heike MacGregor	1,710	23.19	+2.05
People's Alliance	LeRoy Armstrong	766	10.39	–
New Democratic	William Carter	652	8.84	+1.58
Green	Stephanie Coburn	570	7.73	+2.86
Total valid votes		7,375	100.0	
Total rejected ballots		24	0.32	
Turnout		7,399	61.55	
Eligible voters		12,022		
Progressive Conservative notional hold		Swing		-9.46
Source: Elections New Brunswick

=== Kings East ===
2010 New Brunswick general election
Party	Candidate	Votes	%	±%
Progressive Conservative	Bruce Northrup	4,470	66.74	+9.54
Liberal	George Horton	1,415	21.13	-18.18
New Democratic	Robert Murray	487	7.27	+3.79
Green	Jenna Milligan	326	4.87	–
Total valid votes		6,698	100.0	
Total rejected ballots		50	0.74	
Turnout		6,748	67.37	
Eligible voters		10,016		
Progressive Conservative hold		Swing		+13.86
Source: Elections New Brunswick

2006 New Brunswick general election
Party	Candidate	Votes	%	±%
Progressive Conservative	Bruce Northrup	4,071	57.20	+17.76
Liberal	LeRoy Armstrong	2,798	39.31	-6.76
New Democratic	Dana Robert Brown	248	3.48	-11.00
Total valid votes		7,117	100.0	
Progressive Conservative gain from Liberal		Swing		+12.26
Source: Elections New Brunswick

2003 New Brunswick general election
Party	Candidate	Votes	%	±%
Liberal	LeRoy Armstrong	3,169	46.07	+12.43
Progressive Conservative	Doug Cosman	2,713	39.44	-20.48
New Democratic	George Horton	996	14.48	+9.56
Total valid votes		6,878	100.0	
Liberal gain from Progressive Conservative		Swing		+16.46
Source: Elections New Brunswick

1999 New Brunswick general election
Party	Candidate	Votes	%	±%
Progressive Conservative	Doug Cosman	4,310	59.92	+17.66
Liberal	LeRoy Armstrong	2,420	33.64	-9.23
New Democratic	Jessica Coleman	354	4.92	+0.39
Confederation of Regions	Eldon MacKay	109	1.52	-6.12
Total valid votes		7,193	100.0	
Progressive Conservative gain from Liberal		Swing		+13.44
Source: Elections New Brunswick

1995 New Brunswick general election
Party	Candidate	Votes	%	±%
Liberal	LeRoy Armstrong	3,074	42.87	+9.14
Progressive Conservative	Hazen Myers	3,030	42.26	+8.20
Confederation of Regions	Gordon Willden	548	7.64	-17.25
New Democratic	Brian Stone	325	4.53	-2.79
Independent	Brian A. Chown	193	2.69	–
Total valid votes		7,170	100.0	
Liberal gain from Progressive Conservative		Swing		+0.47
Source: Elections New Brunswick

1991 New Brunswick general election
Party	Candidate	Votes	%	±%
Progressive Conservative	Hazen Myers	2,871	34.06	+0.74
Liberal	Tim Wilson	2,843	33.73	-23.03
Confederation of Regions	Mel Stockford	2,098	24.89	–
New Democratic	Anne-Marie Dupuis	617	7.32	-2.60
Total valid votes		8,429	100.0	
Progressive Conservative gain from Liberal		Swing		+11.88
Source: Elections New Brunswick

1987 New Brunswick general election
Party	Candidate	Votes	%	±%
Liberal	P.A. "Pete" Dalton	4,662	56.76	+25.80
Progressive Conservative	Hazen Myers	2,737	33.32	-21.24
New Democratic	Mark Dibblee Connell	815	9.92	-4.56
Total valid votes		8,214	100.0	
Liberal gain from Progressive Conservative		Swing		+23.52
Source: Elections New Brunswick

1982 New Brunswick general election
Party	Candidate	Votes	%	±%
Progressive Conservative	Hazen Elmer Myers	3,808	54.56	-2.20
Liberal	Gordon A. Lewis	2,161	30.96	-6.31
New Democratic	Mark Connell	1,011	14.48	+8.51
Total valid votes		6,980	100.0	
Progressive Conservative hold		Swing		+2.06
Source: Elections New Brunswick

1978 New Brunswick general election
Party	Candidate	Votes	%	±%
Progressive Conservative	Hazen Myers	3,251	56.76	+5.10
Liberal	Gordon A. Lewis	2,135	37.27	-4.65
New Democratic	Ernest A. Seedhouse	342	5.97	–
Total valid votes		5,728	100.0	
Progressive Conservative hold		Swing		+4.88
Source: Elections New Brunswick

1974 New Brunswick general election
Party	Candidate	Votes	%
Progressive Conservative	George Edgar Horton	2,805	51.66
Liberal	John Philip Hynes	2,276	41.92
Independent	George W. Wallace	349	6.43
Total valid votes		5,430	100.0
Source: Elections New Brunswick
