= Bill Fraser (Canadian politician) =

Canadian politician

Minister of Transportation and Infrastructure
- In office June 6, 2016 – October 5, 2018
- Premier: Brian Gallant
- Preceded by: Roger Melanson
- Succeeded by: Denis Landry

Minister of Tourism, Heritage, and Culture
- In office October 7, 2014 – June 6, 2016
- Premier: Brian Gallant
- Preceded by: Trevor Holder
- Succeeded by: John Ames

Member of the New Brunswick Legislative Assembly for Miramichi
- In office September 22, 2014 – September 24, 2018
- Succeeded by: Michelle Conroy

Member of the New Brunswick Legislative Assembly for Miramichi-Bay du Vin
- In office September 18, 2006 – September 22, 2014
- Preceded by: Michael Malley

Personal details
- Party: Liberal

Bill D. Fraser is a politician in the province of New Brunswick, Canada. He was elected to the Legislative Assembly of New Brunswick in the 2006 election as the Liberal MLA for Miramichi-Bay du Vin.

In the 2014 election, he was re-elected in the redistributed riding of Miramichi. He ran again in 2018, but was defeated by Michelle Conroy of the People's Alliance of New Brunswick.
