= Greg Hargrove =

Canadian politician

MLA for York North
- In office 1991–1995
- Preceded by: Robert B. Simpson
- Succeeded by: none, districted abolished

Personal details
- Born: Gregory James Hargrove; March 4, 1959 (age 67) Fredericton, New Brunswick
- Party: New Brunswick Confederation of Regions Party
- Spouse: Wanda

Gregory James Hargrove (born March 4, 1959) is a former politician in New Brunswick, Canada. He led the New Brunswick Confederation of Regions Party from 1995-1999.

Born in Fredericton, New Brunswick in 1959, he was elected to the Legislative Assembly of New Brunswick in the 1991 election along with seven other members of CoR. He defeated incumbent Liberal Robert Simpson in the riding of York North, who had been elected as the first Liberal in the riding since 1953, in the 1987 Liberal sweep. The CoR party went through numerous leadership disputes, and Hargrove eventually became the leader in July 1995 shortly before that year's election. He was defeated in his bid for re-election in the riding of Mactaquac, placing a strong third place.

The CoR party failed to win any seats in the legislature in the 1995 election. Hargrove attempted to re-enter the House in a 1997 by-election in Tantramar, but finished a distant fourth of four candidates, getting only 2.5% of the vote, compared to 10% for the CoR candidate two years earlier.

He continued to the lead the party until after the writs were dropped for the 1999 election, but declined to contest a seat and resigned the leadership. He was replaced as leader by Jim Webb.

1988 Canadian federal election: Fredericton
Party	Candidate	Votes	%	±%
Progressive Conservative	Bud Bird	20,494	42.98	-15.87
Liberal	Brad Woodside	18,939	39.72	+16.66
New Democratic	Allan Sharp	4,922	10.32	-6.89
Confederation of Regions	Greg Hargrove	2,755	5.78	Ø
Rhinoceros	Chris Fullerton	316	0.66	Ø
Independent	Harry Marshall	253	0.53	-0.35
Total valid votes		47,679	100.00	
