= York North (New Brunswick provincial electoral district) =

Coordinates: 46.1505°N 66.913°W

New Brunswick electoral district

Defunct provincial electoral district
- Legislature: Legislative Assembly of New Brunswick
- District created: 1973
- District abolished: 2013
- First contested: 1974
- Last contested: 2010

Demographics
- Population (2006): 14,169

York North was a provincial electoral district for the Legislative Assembly of New Brunswick, Canada. It was first created in the 1973 out of the old two member district of York by taking those parts of York County outside the city of Fredericton and north of the Saint John River. The districts boundaries were significantly altered in 1994 — losing the villages of Nackawic, Millville and surrounding communities — and its name was changed to Mactaquac as a result. In 2006, its boundaries were restored to nearly its original configuration and though the Electoral Boundaries Commission did not recommend a name change, the legislature later decided to revert it to its original name as well.

== Members of the Legislative Assembly ==
Assembly	Years	Member	Party
York North; Riding created from York (1785–1974)
48th	1974–1978	David Bishop	Progressive Conservative
49th	1978–1982	David Bishop	Progressive Conservative
50th	1982–1987	David Bishop	Progressive Conservative
51st	1987–1991	Bob Simpson	Liberal
52nd	1991–1995	Greg Hargrove	Confederation of Regions
Mactaquac
53rd	1995–1999	David Olmstead	Liberal
54th	1999–2003	Kirk MacDonald	Progressive Conservative
55th	2003–2006	Kirk MacDonald	Progressive Conservative
York North
56th	2006–2010	Kirk MacDonald	Progressive Conservative
57th	2010–2014	Kirk MacDonald	Progressive Conservative
Riding dissolved into Carleton-York and Fredericton-York

== Election results ==
=== York North (2006–2014) ===
2010 New Brunswick general election
Party	Candidate	Votes	%	±%
Progressive Conservative	Kirk MacDonald	4,492	63.33	+7.65
Liberal	Eugene Price	1,237	17.44	-21.69
New Democratic	Genevieve MacRae	675	9.52	+4.32
People's Alliance	Steven P. Hawkes	385	5.43	–
Green	Jarrod Currie	304	4.29	–
Total valid votes		7,093	100.0	
Total rejected ballots		40	0.56	
Turnout		7,133	69.31	
Eligible voters		10,291		
Progressive Conservative hold		Swing		+14.67

2006 New Brunswick general election
Party	Candidate	Votes	%	±%
Progressive Conservative	Kirk MacDonald	4,061	55.68	+10.52
Liberal	Larry Jewett	2,854	39.13	-4.66
New Democratic	Anne M. Leslie	379	5.20	-5.86
Total valid votes		7,294	100.0	
Progressive Conservative hold		Swing		+7.59

=== Mactaquac ===
2003 New Brunswick general election
Party	Candidate	Votes	%	±%
Progressive Conservative	Kirk MacDonald	3,337	45.16	-13.81
Liberal	Ray Dillon	3,236	43.79	+11.86
New Democratic	Philip Morgan	817	11.06	+4.86
Total valid votes		7,390	100.0	
Progressive Conservative hold		Swing		-12.84

1999 New Brunswick general election
Party	Candidate	Votes	%	±%
Progressive Conservative	Kirk MacDonald	4,405	58.97	+30.55
Liberal	David Olmstead	2,385	31.93	-9.50
New Democratic	Sandra Burtt	463	6.20	-0.54
Confederation of Regions	Wilmot F. Ross	217	2.90	-20.51
Total valid votes		7,470	100.0	
Progressive Conservative gain from Liberal		Swing		+20.02

1995 New Brunswick general election
Party	Candidate	Votes	%	±%
Liberal	David Olmstead	3,106	41.43	+6.38
Progressive Conservative	Donald Herbert Parent	2,131	28.42	+17.66
Confederation of Regions	Gregory James Hargrove	1,755	23.41	-26.65
New Democratic	Thomas R. Steep	505	6.74	+2.62
Total valid votes		7,497	100.0	
Liberal gain from Confederation of Regions		Swing		-5.64

=== York North (1974–1995) ===
1991 New Brunswick general election
Party	Candidate	Votes	%	±%
Confederation of Regions	Gregory James Hargrove	5,463	50.06	–
Liberal	Bob Simpson	3,825	35.05	-27.10
Progressive Conservative	Mark A. Moir	1,174	10.76	-16.35
New Democratic	Chris Orenstein	450	4.12	-6.62
Total valid votes		10,912	100.0	
Confederation of Regions gain from Liberal		Swing		+38.58

1987 New Brunswick general election
Party	Candidate	Votes	%	±%
Liberal	Bob Simpson	6,221	62.15	+21.68
Progressive Conservative	David Bishop	2,714	27.11	-20.11
New Democratic	Craig Melanson	1,075	10.74	-1.57
Total valid votes		10,010	100.0	
Liberal gain from Progressive Conservative		Swing		+20.90

1982 New Brunswick general election
Party	Candidate	Votes	%	±%
Progressive Conservative	David Bishop	4,278	47.22	-1.48
Liberal	John Hildebrand	3,667	40.47	-1.03
New Democratic	Elizabeth Weir	1,115	12.31	+2.51
Total valid votes		9,060	100.0	
Progressive Conservative hold		Swing		-0.22

1978 New Brunswick general election
Party	Candidate	Votes	%	±%
Progressive Conservative	Adelbert David Bishop	3,681	48.70	-3.64
Liberal	Richard Albert Carr	3,137	41.50	-2.37
New Democratic	Albert Fraser MacDonald	741	9.80	+6.01
Total valid votes		7,559	100.0	
Progressive Conservative hold		Swing		-0.64

1974 New Brunswick general election
Party	Candidate	Votes	%
Progressive Conservative	David Bishop	3,800	52.34
Liberal	Ronald McGuigan	3,185	43.87
New Democratic	Linda M. Hatheway	275	3.79
Total valid votes		7,260	100.0
The previous multi-member riding of York went totally Progressive Conservative in the previous election. Neither of the two incumbents ran in this riding.
