= Department of Human Resources (New Brunswick) =

Department of the government of New Brunswick, Canada

Agency overview
- Formed: 2012
- Jurisdiction: New Brunswick
- Parent department: Government of New Brunswick

The Department of Human Resources is an executive department of the government of New Brunswick. It was created in 2001 from the management board division of the Department of Finance as the Office of Human Resources. Its mandate is to manage the internal human resources of the provincial civil service. It was merged back with management board with both becoming a part of the Executive Council Office in 2011, however it reverted to a standalone agency in October 2012 now styled as the Department, rather than Office, of Human Resources.

== Ministers ==
When the post was created it was styled minister responsible for the office of human resources and was held in addition to another portfolio. From 2003 onward it has been styled minister of human resources, though from October 2010 to October 2012, it was again held in addition to a more senior portfolio.

#	Minister	Term	Government
1.	Elvy Robichaud	October 9, 2001 - 2002 as minister of health and wellness	under Bernard Lord
2.	Rodney Weston	2002 - June 27, 2003 as minister of agriculture, fisheries and aquaculture	under Bernard Lord
3.	Rose-May Poirier	June 27, 2003 - February 14, 2006	under Bernard Lord
4.	Dale Graham	February 14, 2006 - October 3, 2006	under Bernard Lord
5.	Hédard Albert	October 3, 2006 - November 12, 2008	under Shawn Graham
6.	Rick Brewer	Nov. 12, 2008 - Oct. 12, 2010	under Shawn Graham
7.	Blaine Higgs	Oct. 12, 2010 - Oct. 9, 2012 as minister of finance	under David Alward
8.	Troy Lifford	Oct. 9, 2012 - September 23, 2013	under David Alward
9.	Robert Trevors	September 23, 2013 - October 7, 2014	under David Alward
10.	Denis Landry	October 7, 2014 -	Brian Gallant
