= Hazen Myers =

Canadian politician (1934–2021)

MLA for Kings East
- In office 1978–1987
- Preceded by: George Horton
- Succeeded by: Pete Dalton
- In office 1991–1995
- Preceded by: Pete Dalton
- Succeeded by: LeRoy Armstrong

Personal details
- Born: October 22, 1934 Norton, New Brunswick
- Died: May 24, 2021 (aged 86) Apohaqui, New Brunswick
- Party: Progressive Conservative Party of New Brunswick
- Spouse: Joyce Culligan (m.1955)
- Children: four
- Profession: Businessman

Hazen Elmer "Hank" Myers (October 22, 1934 – May 24, 2021) was a Canadian politician. He served in the Legislative Assembly of New Brunswick from 1978 to 1987 and from 1991 to 1995, as a Progressive Conservative member for the constituency of Kings East.
