= John Flynn (New Brunswick politician) =

New Brunswick politician (1954–2021)

Member of the New Brunswick Legislative Assembly for York
- In office 1995–1999
- Preceded by: none
- Succeeded by: Donald Kinney

Personal details
- Born: February 10, 1954 Saint Margarets, New Brunswick, Canada
- Died: December 4, 2021 (aged 67) Fredericton, New Brunswick, Canada
- Party: Liberal Party of New Brunswick

John Patrick Flynn (February 10, 1954 – December 4, 2021) was a former bank manager and political figure in New Brunswick, Canada. He represented York in the Legislative Assembly of New Brunswick from 1995 to 1999 as a Liberal member.

He was born in Saint Margarets, New Brunswick, the son of Thomas J. Flynn and Geraldine Daley. He was first married to Bonnie Vincent, and second to Heike Flynn. Flynn was defeated when he ran for reelection in 1999.

He died on December 4, 2021, in Fredericton, New Brunswick, after a brief battle with cancer.
