= Michael Malley =

Canadian politician

Speaker of the Legislative Assembly of New Brunswick
- In office March 28, 2006 – February 6, 2007
- Preceded by: Bev Harrison
- Succeeded by: Eugene McGinley

Member of the New Brunswick Legislative Assembly for Miramichi-Bay du Vin
- In office 1999–2006
- Preceded by: James Doyle
- Succeeded by: Bill Fraser

Personal details
- Born: July 8, 1962 (age 63) Chatham, New Brunswick
- Party: Progressive Conservative Party of New Brunswick

Michael "Tanker" Malley (born July 8, 1962) is a former Canadian politician in New Brunswick, Canada. He represented the riding of Miramichi-Bay du Vin in the Legislative Assembly of New Brunswick from 1999 to 2006 and served as Speaker of the Assembly for part of 2006.

== Political career ==
Malley, a former Miramichi city councillor and bus driver, was first elected to the legislature in the 1999 election and was re-elected in 2003.

The 2003 election returned his Progressive Conservatives to a majority government of just a one-seat margin. Malley was named whip, a position of expanded importance in a legislature with such close numbers. He was widely called upon by leaders in his community to leave the government in 2004 if the Lord government did not back away from rumoured health care cuts in the region. In the end, the cuts were not as severe as had been rumoured and Malley remained in caucus.

On February 17, 2006, shortly after a cabinet shuffle, Malley announced he would leave the Conservative caucus to sit as an independent. He expressed disappointment in the government's overall direction and in his not being included in cabinet despite being the only representative of Miramichi in the Conservative caucus.

Premier Bernard Lord alleged Malley had less savory motives for leaving Lord's governing Conservative party. Lord alleged at a news conference that Malley made five specific demands in exchange for staying with the Conservatives, including: more money for his constituency office, more help for the Miramichi's troubled paper mill and the appointment of a friend as his special assistant. Lord further alleged that Malley demanded he immediately appoint Fredericton lawyer Cleveland Allaby, who Lord called a "good friend" of Mr. Malley's, as provincial court judge in the Miramichi. Allaby, however, denied this allegation. Malley also denied these allegations.

Malley's floor crossing changed Lord's Progressive Conservative government from a majority to a minority, leaving the house standings at 27 Progressive Conservatives, 26 Liberals, and two independents – Malley and former Liberal Frank Branch. When Malley announced he was leaving the Conservatives, he stated that he would use his new position of influence to support legislation that helps the poor people of New Brunswick and residents of the Miramichi region.

=== Speaker of the Legislative Assembly of New Brunswick ===
On March 28, 2006, Malley was acclaimed as Speaker of the Legislature after Tony Huntjens, the nominee of Bernard Lord, withdrew his name. Electing Malley as speaker, a position in which one only votes in the case of a tie, instead of a member of the government caucus, provides the government considerable more flexibility. Though still technically a minority government, by tradition, should there be a tie on a vote of confidence, the Speaker would vote in favour of the government.

On April 13, 2006, Malley announced he was rejoining the Progressive Conservative caucus, though as Speaker he would not attend caucus meetings and he would remain impartial. Liberal leader Shawn Graham and New Democratic Party leader Allison Brewer (whose party is not currently represented in the legislature, but was from 1991 to 2005) criticized the decision. Graham said Malley was making the legislature the "laughing stock" of the Commonwealth because of the unusual and unprecedented move of a, by definition, non-partisan Speaker announcing from his chair his change in partisan affiliation. Brewer said a mockery was being made of office of speaker. As Malley remains only able to vote in the case of a tie, the actual status of the legislature is unchanged with 27 ordinally voting members of the government, 27 members of the opposition and an impartial Speaker. The significance of this move, however, is a motion passed by the legislature in 2003 which requires the opposition withhold a vote on committees on which the government does not have a majority in order to "preserve the government majority". Premier Benard Lord argues he now has a majority again and the opposition should honour the terms of that motion while the Opposition has said that they do not recognize a change of affiliation from a speaker in the chair and will still operate as if the government were in a minority situation until such time as the Speaker resigns, sits among the Conservative caucus and re-offers for his office as a Conservative.

Through much of May, the Government and Opposition began to negotiate to bring some order back to the legislature. With only two parties represented, the tight numbers make it difficult for the Government to pass some of its agenda through the House and they had proposed radical rule changes to increase their majority inside of legislative committees. The Liberals opposed this saying it would turn the legislature into little more than a rubber stamp. A counter proposal offered by the Liberals was to see Malley resign as speaker and, in exchange, the Liberals would allow one of their members to stand for the post therefore increasing the working majority of the government by two votes. In exchange, the Liberals wanted an early election in the fall of 2006. Though the Conservative Government rejected this offer, the Liberals and Conservatives began negotiations which included the possibility of removing Malley from office. On May 24, 2006, Government House Leader Bev Harrison, Malley's predecessor as Speaker, said the government would not force Malley from office but, were he still Speaker, he would resign to resolve the deadlock. Malley refused to comment to the media on this situation.

A vote on May 30, 2006 to remove Malley from office was defeated 27 to 25. Later, however, fellow Progressive Conservative Peter Mesheau announced his plans to resign from the legislature and rather than face another minority, Bernard Lord called an election.

In the general provincial election of September 18, 2006, Malley lost his seat to Liberal challenger Bill Fraser. Malley was soundly defeated, trailing his opponent by better than 20 percentage points in the popular vote.

Following his defeat, Malley was expected to continue to receive a salary as Speaker, though not as MLA, until a new Speaker is elected on February 6, 2007. This attracted some controversy.

Preceded by Bev Harrison	Speaker of the Legislative Assembly of New Brunswick; 2006-2007	Succeeded by Eugene McGinley
Preceded by James Doyle (Liberal)	Member of the Legislative Assembly for Miramichi-Bay du Vin; 1999-2006	Succeeded by Bill Fraser (Liberal)
