= Douglas I. Cosman =

Canadian politician

Douglas Ivan Cosman (born May 21, 1938) is a minister, businessman, and former political figure in New Brunswick, Canada. He represented Kings East in the Legislative Assembly of New Brunswick from 1999 to 2003 as a Progressive Conservative member.

He was born at Head of Millstream, Kings County, New Brunswick, the eldest son of Kenneth Cosman and Helen (Riedle) Cosman. He studied at Mount Allison University and Pine Hill Divinity Hall in Halifax. Cosman was ordained a minister in the United Church and served in Albert County from 1962 to 1965. He then served as a chaplain in the Royal Canadian Air Force until he retired from the Air Force in 1991. Thereafter he continued to serve the Church. With his wife, he operated a bed and breakfast and motel. They have four children–Vaughn, Mary, Gail and Valerie.
