= James Doyle (New Brunswick politician) =

Canadian politician (1932–2020)

Member of the New Brunswick Legislative Assembly for Miramichi-Bay du Vin
- In office 1997–1999
- Preceded by: Frank McKenna
- Succeeded by: Michael Malley

Personal details
- Born: November 28, 1932 Dalhousie, New Brunswick
- Died: April 15, 2020 (aged 87) Fredericton, New Brunswick
- Party: New Brunswick Liberal Association
- Profession: educator

James Albert Doyle (November 28, 1932 – April 15, 2020) was the Member of the New Brunswick Legislative Assembly (MLA) for the constituency of Miramichi-Bay du Vin from 1997 to 1999. He succeeded former MLA Frank McKenna upon his retirement as member for the provincial constituency.

Originally from Dalhousie, New Brunswick, he spent his working life in Chatham, New Brunswick. He was a longtime educator, retiring as Principal of James M. Hill High School. In retirement, he was instrumental in establishing a campus of St. Thomas University in the Miramichi. He died in 2020 in Fredericton, aged 87.
