= Carolle de Ste. Croix =

Canadian politician

MLA for Dalhousie-Restigouche East
- In office 1995–1999
- Preceded by: district created
- Succeeded by: Dennis Furlong

Personal details
- Born: Marie Carolle Lise de Ste-Croix; November 28, 1968 (age 56); Dalhousie, New Brunswick
- Political party: Liberal
- Occupation: educator, researcher, politician

Marie Carolle Lise de Ste-Croix (born November 28, 1968) is a Canadian educator, researcher and former political figure in New Brunswick. She represented Dalhousie-Restigouche East in the Legislative Assembly of New Brunswick from 1995 to 1999 as a Liberal member.

== Biography ==
She was born in Dalhousie, New Brunswick and graduated from Mount Allison University in 1990 with a Bachelor of Arts in Canadian Studies. She then received a Masters in Science from the University of Guelph. De Ste-Croix was a teacher and French instructor in Iqaluit. She was defeated when she ran for re-election in 1999. Since September 2006, she has worked as Director of Alumni and Development for Mount Allison University.
