= Dale Graham =

Canadian politician (born 1951)

Speaker of the Legislative Assembly of New Brunswick
- In office October 27, 2010 – October 25, 2014
- Preceded by: Roy Boudreau
- Succeeded by: Chris Collins

Deputy Premier of New Brunswick
- In office June 21, 1999 – October 3, 2006
- Premier: Bernard Lord
- Preceded by: Doug Tyler
- Succeeded by: Donald Arseneault

Minister of Human Resources
- In office February 14, 2006 – October 3, 2006
- Premier: Bernard Lord
- Preceded by: Rose-May Poirier
- Succeeded by: Hédard Albert

Minister of Supply and Services
- In office June 21, 1999 – February 14, 2006
- Premier: Bernard Lord
- Preceded by: Greg O'Donnell
- Succeeded by: Bev Harrison

Member of the New Brunswick Legislative Assembly for Carleton
- In office September 11, 1995 – September 22, 2014
- Preceded by: District created
- Succeeded by: District abolished

Member of the New Brunswick Legislative Assembly for Carleton North
- In office June 28, 1993 – September 11, 1995
- Preceded by: Fred Harvey
- Succeeded by: District abolished

Personal details
- Born: Dale Allison Graham; October 6, 1951 (age 73); Woodstock, New Brunswick
- Political party: Progressive Conservative

Dale Allison Graham (born October 6, 1951) is a former politician in New Brunswick, Canada. He served as an MLA from 1993 to 2014, as Speaker of the Legislative Assembly of New Brunswick from 2010 to 2014, and as a member of the provincial cabinet from 1999 to 2006.

== Early life and career ==
Born in Woodstock, New Brunswick, the son of Robert Graham and Letha Delong, Graham attended school in Centreville. He became a small business owner and was involved in local politics at the school board level. He married Shelley McDougall in 1972. In the 1991 provincial election, Graham was defeated by Liberal incumbent Fred Harvey, however Harvey's victory was later declared void when Harvey was convicted of violating election spending laws. Graham was successful in a by-election in 1993 winning the Carleton North seat. Graham went on to be re-elected in the new electoral district of Carleton in the 1995, 1999, 2003, 2006 and 2010 elections.

Graham's 1993 victory was a key test for his Progressive Conservative Party of New Brunswick. His party had been defeated provincially in 1987 going from having led the government for 17 years to being shut out of the legislature. Though the party regained 3 seats in the 58 seat legislature in 1991, the upstart Confederation of Regions Party of New Brunswick (CoR) had won 8 seats and claimed official opposition. Graham's victory was seen as a sign that CoR would not necessarily displace the Progressive Conservatives as the voice of conservatism in Anglophone New Brunswick.

In 1999, Graham's party was returned to government. Graham, who co-chaired the election campaign, was named deputy premier and Minister of Supply and Services. On July 21, 2005, Graham added the responsibilities of Minister of Environment & Local Government on an acting basis when his cabinet colleague Brenda Fowlie was forced to resign from the cabinet. He retained the portfolio until November 21, 2005.

In a cabinet shuffle on February 14, 2006, Graham was shuffled to the post of minister responsible for the Office of Human Resources and for Service New Brunswick. He retained his honorary post of deputy premier.

His party failed to win a plurality of seats in the 2006 election so Graham left cabinet and returned to opposition. He was re-elected in 2010 and his party returned to government, and he became dean of the legislature; he was excluded from cabinet but was elected to serve as speaker of the legislature. He did not seek re-election in 2014.

| Roy Boudreau | Speaker of Legislative Assembly of New Brunswick; 2010–2014 | Chris Collins |
| new district | MLA for Carleton; 1995–2014 | district abolished |
| Vacant Title last held by Fred Harvey (Liberal) | MLA for Carleton North; 1993–1995 | district abolished |

New Brunswick provincial government of Bernard Lord
Cabinet posts (3)
| Predecessor | Office | Successor |
| Rose-May Poirier | Minister of Human Resources; 2006 | Hédard Albert |
| Greg O'Donnell | Minister of Supply and Services; 1999–2006 | Bev Harrison |
| Brenda Fowlie | Minister of Environment and Local Government (acting); 2005 | Trevor Holder |
Special Cabinet Responsibilities
| Predecessor | Title | Successor |
| Doug Tyler | Deputy Premier of New Brunswick; 1999–2006; Deputy Premier was not included in the next cabinet | Donald Arseneault |
| Percy Mockler | Minister responsible for Service New Brunswick; 2006 | Greg Byrne |
