= Leo McAdam =

Canadian politician (1929–2024)

Member of the Legislative Assembly of New Brunswick
- In office 1987–1995
- Preceded by: Eric Kipping
- Succeeded by: District abolished
- Constituency: Saint John North

Personal details
- Born: July 3, 1929 Lake Verde, Prince Edward Island
- Died: July 17, 2024 (aged 95)
- Party: New Brunswick Liberal Association
- Spouse: Mary Eileen Harley Barbara Thomas
- Children: 7
- Occupation: businessman

Leo Anthony McAdam (July 3, 1929 – July 17, 2024) was a Canadian politician. He served in the Legislative Assembly of New Brunswick from 1987 to 1995 as a Liberal member from the constituency of Saint John North. McAdam died on July 17, 2024, at the age of 95.
