= Carleton-York =

Provincial electoral district in New Brunswick, Canada

New Brunswick electoral district
- The riding of Carleton-York (as it exists from 2023) in relation to other New Brunswick electoral districts
- Coordinates: 45.913°N 67.293°W

Provincial electoral district
- Legislature: Legislative Assembly of New Brunswick
MLA
Richard Ames
Progressive Conservative
- District created: 2013
- First contested: 2014
- Last contested: 2024

Demographics
- Population (2011): 15,790
- Electors (2013): 11,336
- Census division(s): York, Carleton

Carleton-York is a provincial electoral district for the Legislative Assembly of New Brunswick, Canada. It was contested for the first time in the 2014 general election. It was created in the 2013 redistribution of electoral boundaries.

The district draws its population from the northwestern parts of York County and southern parts of Carleton County, the boundaries commission proposed it be named "York" which might have been confused with its immediate predecessor of the same name which was based in southwestern York County. The two districts share only about 12% of population in common. Accordingly, a committee of the legislative assembly changed the name to Carleton-York before the district could be contested.

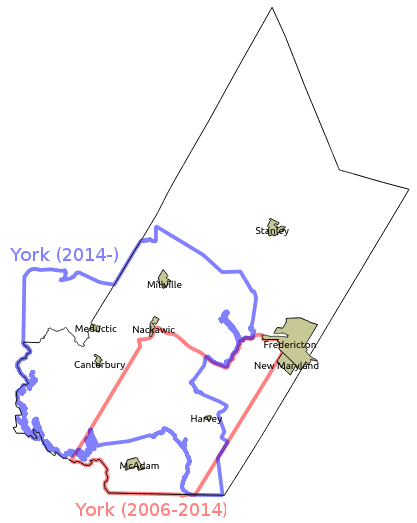
The electoral districts of York (2006–2014) and York (2014– ) as they relate to York County and its municipalities.

The new district includes all of Carleton County south of the town of Woodstock, and northwestern parts of York County including Nackawic-Millville, Lakeland Ridges and Harvey.

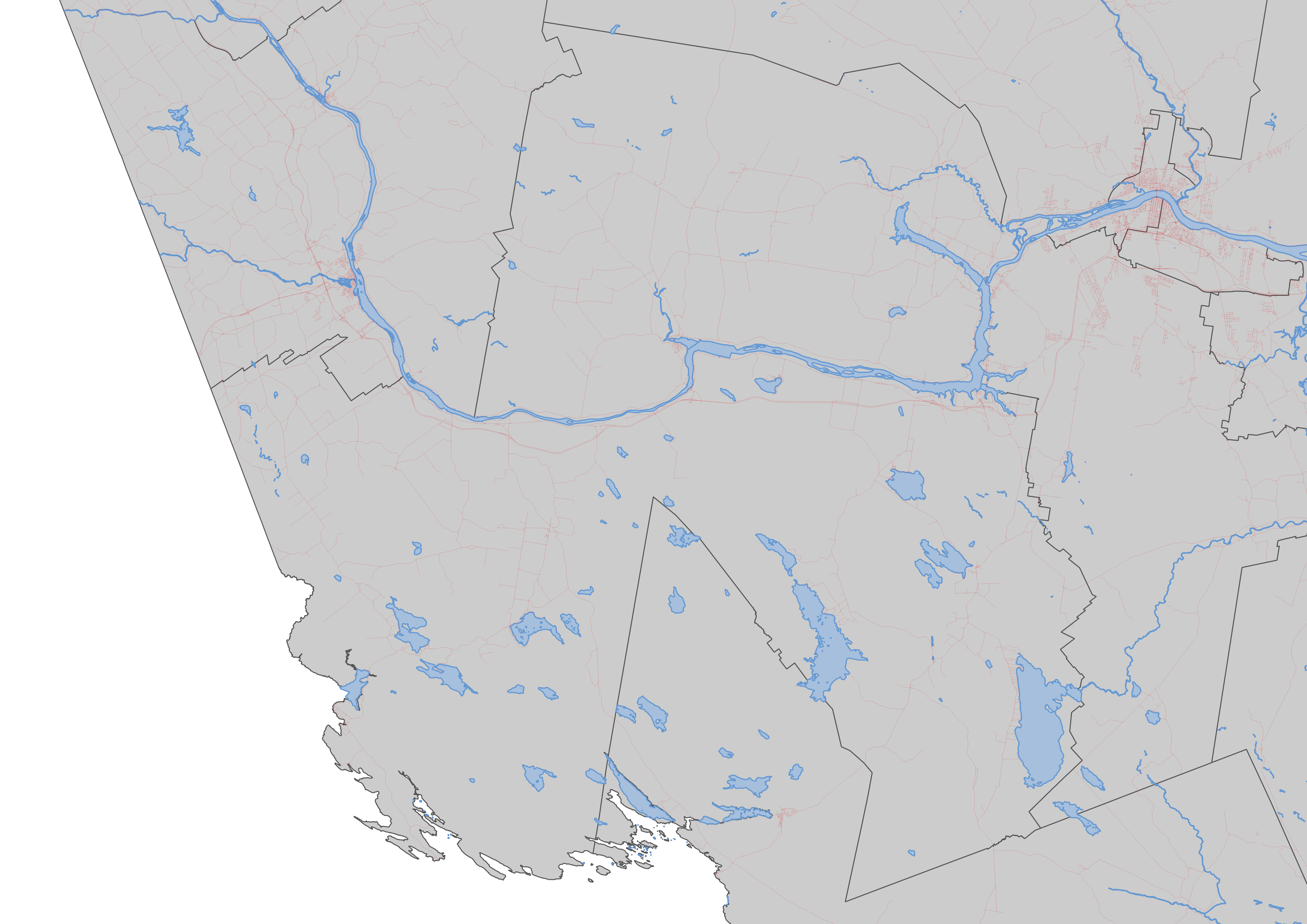
Carleton-York (as it exists from 2023) and the roads in the riding

== Members of the Legislative Assembly ==
| Assembly | Years | Member | Party |
|---|---|---|---|
Riding created from York North, Woodstock and York (1995–2014)
| 58th | 2014–2018 | Carl Urquhart | Progressive Conservative |
| 59th | 2018–2020 | Carl Urquhart | Progressive Conservative |
| 60th | 2020–2024 | Richard Ames | Progressive Conservative |
| 61st | 2024–Present | Richard Ames | Progressive Conservative |

== Election results ==
2024 New Brunswick general election
| Party | Candidate | Votes | % | ±% |
|---|---|---|---|---|
| Progressive Conservative | Richard Ames | 4,622 | 58.9% | +1.07 |
| Liberal | Chris Duffie | 2,136 | 27.2% | +15.76 |
| Green | Burt Folkins | 675 | 8.6% | -2.24 |
| People's Alliance | Sterling Wright | 415 | 5.3% | -13.25 |
| Total valid votes | | 7,848 | | |
| Total rejected ballots | | | | |
| Turnout | | | | |
| Eligible voters | | | | |
Source: Elections New Brunswick

2020 New Brunswick general election
| Party | Candidate | Votes | % | ±% |
|---|---|---|---|---|
| Progressive Conservative | Richard Ames | 4,750 | 57.83 | +20.67 |
| People's Alliance | Gary Lemmon | 1,524 | 18.55 | -12.24 |
| Liberal | Robert Kitchen | 940 | 11.44 | -7.11 |
| Green | Louise Comeau | 890 | 10.84 | +0.86 |
| New Democratic | Jarrett Oldenburg | 110 | 1.34 | -1.70 |
| Total valid votes | | 8,214 | 99.90 | |
| Total rejected ballots | | 8 | 0.10 | |
| Turnout | | 8,222 | 67.54 | |
| Eligible voters | | 12,174 | | |
| Progressive Conservative hold | | Swing | | +16.46 |
Source: Elections New Brunswick

2018 New Brunswick general election
| Party | Candidate | Votes | % | ±% |
|---|---|---|---|---|
| Progressive Conservative | Carl Urquhart | 3,118 | 37.16 | -9.37 |
| People's Alliance | Gary Lemmon | 2,583 | 30.79 | +23.33 |
| Liberal | Jackie Morehouse | 1,556 | 18.55 | -9.44 |
| Green | Sue Rickards | 837 | 9.98 | +2.33 |
| New Democratic | Robert Kitchen | 255 | 3.04 | -7.33 |
| KISS | Lloyd Maurey | 40 | 0.48 | -- |
| Total valid votes | | 8,389 | 100.0 | |
| Total rejected ballots | | 10 | | |
| Turnout | | 8,399 | 69.61% | |
| Eligible voters | | 12,066 | | |
| Progressive Conservative hold | | Swing | | -16.3 |
Source: Elections New Brunswick

2014 New Brunswick general election
| Party | Candidate | Votes | % |
|---|---|---|---|
| Progressive Conservative | Carl Urquhart | 3,662 | 46.53 |
| Liberal | Ashley Cummings | 2,203 | 27.99 |
| New Democratic | Jacob Elsinga | 816 | 10.37 |
| Green | Terry Wishart | 602 | 7.65 |
| People's Alliance | David Graham | 587 | 7.46 |
| Total valid votes | | 7,870 | 100.0 |
| Total rejected ballots | | 16 | 0.20 |
| Turnout | | 7,886 | 65.08 |
| Eligible voters | | 12,117 | |
This riding was created from York North, Woodstock and the former riding of York, all of which elected a Progressive Conservative in the previous election. Carl Urquhart was the incumbent from the former riding of York.
Source: Elections New Brunswick

== See also ==
- List of New Brunswick provincial electoral districts
- Canadian provincial electoral districts
