= Sherry Wilson =

Canadian politician

Sherry Wilson MLA
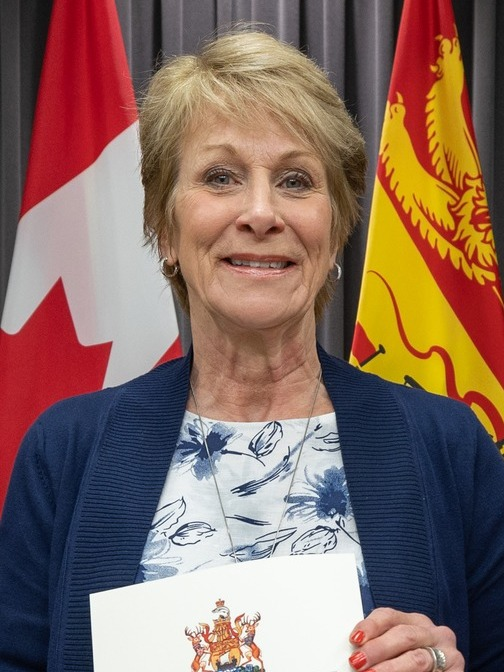
- Wilson in 2024

Minister responsible for Addictions and Mental Health Services
- In office June 27, 2023 – November 2, 2024
- Preceded by: Bruce Fitch
- Succeeded by: Rob McKee

Minister of Service New Brunswick
- In office November 9, 2018 – September 29, 2020
- Premier: Blaine Higgs
- Preceded by: Benoît Bourque
- Succeeded by: Mary Wilson

Member of the New Brunswick Legislative Assembly for Albert-Riverview
- Incumbent
- Assumed office October 21, 2024
- Preceded by: District created

Member of the New Brunswick Legislative Assembly for Moncton Southwest
- In office September 22, 2014 – October 21, 2024
- Preceded by: District created
- Succeeded by: District abolished

Member of the New Brunswick Legislative Assembly for Petitcodiac
- In office September 27, 2010 – September 22, 2014
- Preceded by: Wally Stiles
- Succeeded by: District abolished

Dean of the Legislative Assembly of New Brunswick
- Incumbent
- Assumed office September 19, 2024
- Preceded by: Bruce Fitch

Personal details
- Born: Intervale, New Brunswick, Canada
- Party: Progressive Conservative

Sherry Wilson is a Canadian politician, who was elected to the Legislative Assembly of New Brunswick in the 2014 provincial election. Since 2024, she represents the electoral district of Albert-Riverview as a member of the Progressive Conservatives. She was first elected as the MLA for Petitcodiac in 2010 and was re-elected in Moncton Southwest in the 2014, 2018, and 2020 provincial elections. After the 2024 election, she became the longest serving member of the Legislative Assembly of New Brunswick.

== Early life ==
Wilson grew up on a dairy farm in Intervale, New Brunswick and attended schools in Petitcodiac. She is one of nine children. Following high school, she completed a business and secretarial course at Campbellton Community College.

== Before politics ==
After college she began working at Hub Meat Packers in Moncton where she was Credit Manager Assistant and after moving to Edmonton, Alberta, she worked at the University Hospital in administration. After two years in Alberta, she moved back to New Brunswick, settling in Riverview, where she bought her own business in 1984.

Wilson also volunteered for the RCMP from 1991 to 1999 as Victim Services Coordinator. In 2002 and 2003, she was the president of the Downtown Riverview Business Association and in 2004 she was elected to Riverview Town Council and was re-elected in 2008. She sat on the Codiac Regional Policing Authority Board, the Immigration Board, and the Finn report committee, among other committees and boards, and served as deputy mayor in 2005.

== Political career ==
Wilson ran for a seat to the New Brunswick Legislature in the 2010 provincial election. She stood as a Progressive Conservative candidate in the electoral district of Petitcodiac. She defeated Wally Stiles, a former cabinet minister who crossed the floor from the Progressive Conservatives to the Liberals in 2007, to take back the seat for her party. After the Petitcodiac electoral district was abolished in the 2013 electoral redistribution, Wilson ran and was re-elected in the newly created district of Moncton Southwest in the 2014 provincial election. She was re-elected again in the 2018 and 2020 provincial elections.

On November 9, 2018, she was sworn-in as Minister of Service New Brunswick and Minister responsible for Women's Equality, in the Progressive Conservative government of Premier Blaine Higgs. On June 27, 2023, she was sworn-in as the Minister responsible for Addictions and Mental Health Services.

As a result of the 2021 electoral redistribution, Wilson is running in the 2024 provincial election in the Albert-Riverview electoral district.

On September 30, 2024, Wilson released a National Day for Truth and Reconciliation statement on her campaign page in which she compared residential schools to the parental rights movement, specifically making a comparison to the original version of Policy 713. Her statement received criticism from opposition parties, with several indigenous peoples also calling for her withdrawal as a candidate for the party, including by Pabineau First Nation Chief Terry Richardson as well as by the six Wolastoqey Nation chiefs, who released a statement reading: "That she would try to draw this dog-whistle comparison on the National Day for Truth and Reconciliation should make every New Brunswicker ashamed that she was recently a minister for this province in the Higgs government."

== Electoral record ==
=== Albert-Riverview ===
2024 New Brunswick general election: Albert-Riverview
Party	Candidate	Votes	%	±%
Progressive Conservative	Sherry Wilson	4,363	52.4%	-9.95
Liberal	Dave Gouthro	2,599	31.2%	+19.81
Green	Liam MacDougall	972	11.7%	-1.36
People's Alliance	Sharon Buchanan	297	3.6%	-8.49
Libertarian	William Jones	97	1.2%	
Total valid votes		8,328		
Total rejected ballots				
Turnout				
Eligible voters				
Source: Elections New Brunswick

=== Moncton Southwest ===
2020 New Brunswick general election
Party	Candidate	Votes	%	±%
Progressive Conservative	Sherry Wilson	3,679	52.13	10.39
Liberal	René Ephestion	1,561	22.12	-16.00
Green	Claire Kelly	927	13.13	+0.17
People's Alliance	Susan Matthews	667	9.45	--
New Democratic	Juliana McIntosh	224	3.17	-4.02
Total valid votes		7,058		
Total rejected ballots		12	0.17	-0.33
Turnout		7,070	58.47	+0.59
Eligible voters		12,081		
Progressive Conservative hold		Swing		+13.20
Source: Elections New Brunswick

2018 New Brunswick general election
Party	Candidate	Votes	%	±%
Progressive Conservative	Sherry Wilson	2,920	41.73	+2.97
Liberal	Susy Campos	2,667	38.11	+3.14
Green	Sarah Colwell	907	12.96	+6.93
New Democratic	Hailey Duffy	503	7.19	-10.17
Total valid votes		6,997	100.0	
Total rejected ballots		35	0.50	
Turnout		7,032	57.98	
Eligible voters		12,128		
Source: Elections New Brunswick

2014 New Brunswick general election
Party	Candidate	Votes	%
Progressive Conservative	Sherry Wilson	2,523	38.80
Liberal	Tyson Milner	2,274	34.97
New Democratic	Charles Doucet	1,129	17.36
Green	Mathieu Pierre LaPlante	392	6.03
People's Alliance	Lucy Goguen	184	2.83
Total valid votes		6,502	100.0
Total rejected ballots		26	0.40
Turnout		6,528	54.77
Eligible voters		11,919	
This riding was created from parts of Moncton North, Petitcodiac, Moncton West and Moncton Crescent, all of which elected Progressive Conservatives in the previous election. Sherry Wilson was the incumbent from Petitcodiac.
Source: Elections New Brunswick

=== Petitcodiac ===
2010 New Brunswick general election
Party	Candidate	Votes	%	±%
Progressive Conservative	Sherry Wilson	4,133	55.69	-9.22
Liberal	Wally Stiles	1,772	23.87	-5.73
Green	Bethany Thorne-Dykstra	856	11.53	–
New Democratic	Leta Both	661	8.91	+3.43
Total valid votes		7,422	100.0	
Total rejected ballots		44	0.59	
Turnout		7,466	68.40	
Eligible voters		10,915		
Progressive Conservative gain from Liberal		Swing		-1.74
Liberal candidate Wally Stiles lost 41.04 percentage points from his 2006 performance running as a Progressive Conservative.
Source: Elections New Brunswick
