= Jack MacDougall =

New Brunswick green politician

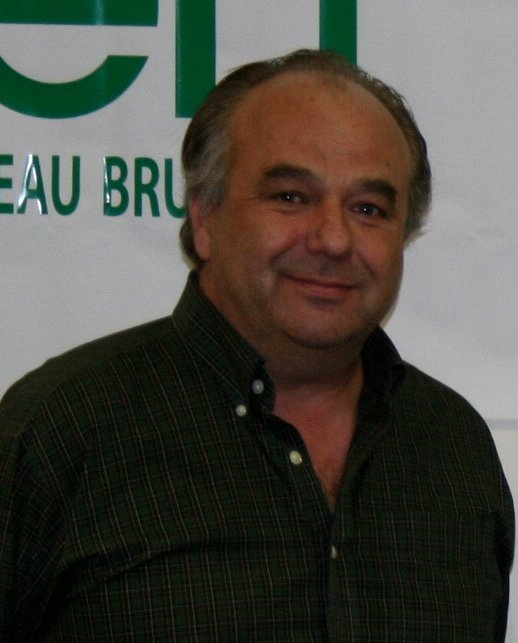
- MacDougall in August 2010

Leader of the Green Party of New Brunswick
- In office 2009–2011
- Preceded by: Erik Millett (interim)
- Succeeded by: Greta Doucet (interim)

Personal details
- Born: 1953 (age 72–73)
- Party: Green Party of New Brunswick (2008–); New Brunswick Liberal Association (–2008)

Jack MacDougall (born 1953) is a former politician in New Brunswick, Canada.

He was owner-operator of a taxi business in Saint John, New Brunswick which he sold prior to 1982. In 1982, he led a 1-year, $1 million fundraising campaign to save the Imperial Theatre. He worked for the Liberal Party of New Brunswick from 1984 to 1999. In 2002, he was an unsuccessful candidate for leader of the party. In August 2008, he was hired by the Green Party of Canada as Maritimes Organizer.

On September 24, 2009, MacDougall was acclaimed the leader of the Green Party of New Brunswick. In the 2010 general election, the Green Party polled 4.5 per cent of the vote and elected no members. In his own riding of Fredericton-Nashwaaksis, MacDougall finished third with 9.4 per cent of the vote. He resigned as leader on September 12, 2011.

He received an award "for breaking the mold" for his work in saving the Imperial Theatre in 2013.

== Electoral record ==
2010 New Brunswick general election: Fredericton-Nashwaaksis
Party	Candidate	Votes	%	±%
Progressive Conservative	Troy Lifford	3,720	47.56	+0.57
Liberal	T.J. Burke	2,760	35.29	-13.85
Green	Jack MacDougall	741	9.47	–
New Democratic	Dana Brown	601	7.68	+3.81
Total valid votes		7,822	100.0	
Total rejected ballots		32	0.41	
Turnout		7,854	69.93	
Eligible voters		11,232		
Progressive Conservative gain from Liberal		Swing		+7.21
Source: Elections New Brunswick

2002 New Brunswick Liberal Association leadership election May 12, 2002
Candidate	Votes	%
Shawn Graham	1,349	74.5
Jack MacDougall	461	25.5

== See also ==
- List of Green party leaders in Canada
