= John Lebans =

Canadian politician

Member of the New Brunswick Legislative Assembly for Moncton North
- In office February 15, 1993 – June 26, 1995
- Preceded by: Michael McKee
- Succeeded by: Gene Devereux

Personal details
- Party: Liberal
- Occupation: Accountant

John Lebans is a former politician in the province of New Brunswick, Canada. He was elected to the Legislative Assembly of New Brunswick in a February 15, 1993 by-election to replace Michael McKee, who was appointed to a judgeship. Lebans chose not to run for re-election and resigned on June 26, 1995 just before the 1995 election.

He represented the electoral district of Moncton North.
