= Dieppe-Memramcook =

Electoral district in New Brunswick, Canada

New Brunswick electoral district
- The riding of Dieppe-Memramcook (as it exists from 2023) in relation to other New Brunswick electoral districts

Provincial electoral district
- Legislature: Legislative Assembly of New Brunswick
MLA
Natacha Vautour
Liberal
- District created: 2023
- First contested: 2024

Dieppe-Memramcook
New Brunswick electoral district

Defunct provincial electoral district
- Legislature: Legislative Assembly of New Brunswick
- District created: 1973
- District abolished: 2006
- First contested: 1974
- Last contested: 2003

Dieppe-Memramcook is a provincial electoral district for the Legislative Assembly of New Brunswick, Canada. It was known as Memramcook from 1974 to 1994, and renamed Dieppe-Memramcook, until its dissolution in 2006.

Following the 2023 redistribution, the riding was re-created out of parts of Dieppe and Memramcook-Tantramar.

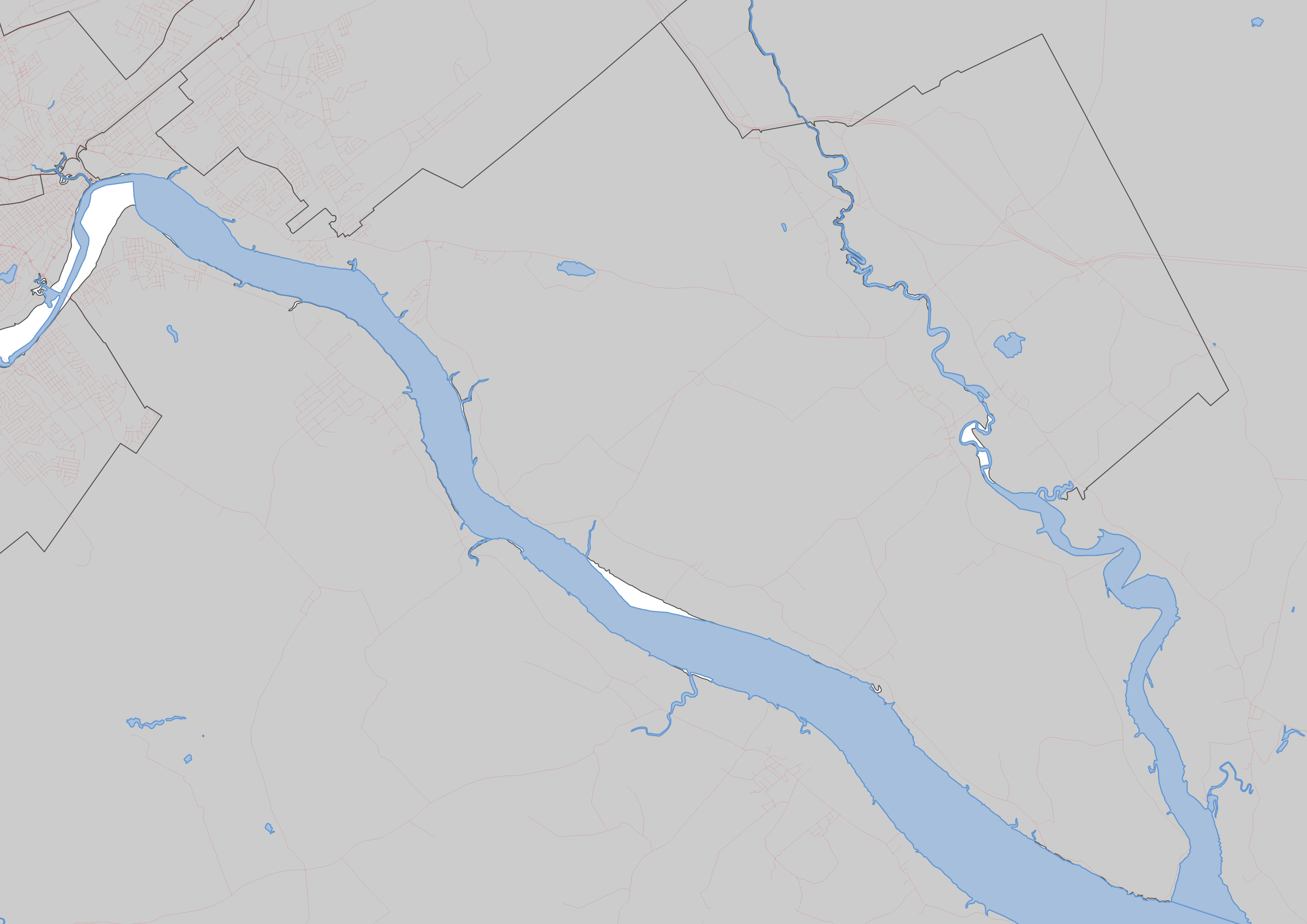
Dieppe-Memramcook (as it exists from 2023) and the roads in the riding

== Members of the Legislative Assembly ==
Assembly	Years	Member	Party
Memramcook; Riding created from Westmorland
48th	1974–1978	William Malenfant	Liberal
49th	1978–1982	William Malenfant	Liberal
50th	1982–1987	Clarence Cormier	Progressive Conservative
51st	1987–1991	Greg O'Donnell	Liberal
52nd	1991–1995	Greg O'Donnell	Liberal
Dieppe-Memramcook
53rd	1995–1999	Greg O'Donnell	Liberal
54th	1999–2003	Cy LeBlanc	Progressive Conservative
55th	2003–2006	Cy LeBlanc	Progressive Conservative
Riding dissolved into Memramcook-Lakeville-Dieppe and Dieppe Centre
Riding recreated from Dieppe and Memramcook-Tantramar
61st	2024–Present	Natacha Vautour	Liberal

== Election results ==
=== Dieppe-Memramcook ===
2024 New Brunswick general election
Party	Candidate	Votes	%	±%
Liberal	Natacha Vautour	5,600	66.3%	+4.9
Green	Jacques Giguère	1,531	18.1%	+1.0
Progressive Conservative	Dean Léonard	1,311	15.5%	-3.9
Total valid votes				
Total rejected ballots				
Turnout				
Eligible voters				
Source: Elections New Brunswick

2020 provincial election redistributed results
Party	%
Liberal	61.4
Progressive Conservative	19.4
Green	17.1
New Democratic	1.6
People's Alliance	0.3

2003 New Brunswick general election
Party	Candidate	Votes	%	±%
Progressive Conservative	Cy LeBlanc	5,541	47.05	-1.62
Liberal	Elie Richard	5,451	46.28	+1.99
New Democratic	Hélène Lapointe	786	6.67	-0.37
Total valid votes		11,778	99.22	
Total rejected ballots		93	0.78	+0.05
Turnout		11,871	71.01	-7.17
Eligible voters		16,718		
Progressive Conservative hold		Swing		-1.81

1999 New Brunswick general election
Party	Candidate	Votes	%	±%
Progressive Conservative	Cy LeBlanc	5,206	48.66	+25.88
Liberal	Greg O'Donnell	4,738	44.29	-25.06
New Democratic	Marc LeBel	754	7.05	+1.02
Total valid votes		10,698	99.27	
Total rejected ballots		79	0.73	-0.14
Turnout		10,777	78.17	+2.61
Eligible voters		13,786		
Progressive Conservative gain from Liberal		Swing		+25.47

1995 New Brunswick general election
Party	Candidate	Votes	%	±%
Liberal	Greg O'Donnell	6,639	69.34	+0.43
Progressive Conservative	Bernard Lord	2,181	22.78	+15.45
New Democratic	Bernice Butler	577	6.03	-13.34
Confederation of Regions	Robert Henry	177	1.85	-2.54
Total valid votes		9,574	99.13	
Total rejected ballots		84	0.87	+0.29
Turnout		9,658	75.56	-6.60
Eligible voters		12,782		
Liberal hold		Swing		-7.51

=== Memramcook ===
1991 New Brunswick general election
Party	Candidate	Votes	%	±%
Liberal	Greg O'Donnell	6,393	68.91	+11.33
New Democratic	Martin Aubin	1,797	19.37	+9.09
Progressive Conservative	Jean-Robert Gaudet	680	7.33	-24.81
Confederation of Regions	Julia Elnora LeBlanc	407	4.39	–
Total valid votes		9,277	99.42	
Total rejected ballots		54	0.58	+0.11
Turnout		9,331	82.16	-5.72
Eligible voters		11,357		
Liberal hold		Swing		+1.12

1987 New Brunswick general election
Party	Candidate	Votes	%	±%
Liberal	Greg O'Donnell	5,220	57.58	+10.66
Progressive Conservative	Clarence Cormier	2,914	32.14	-15.74
New Democratic	Claire Doiron	932	10.28	+5.08
Total valid votes		9,066	99.59	
Total rejected ballots		43	0.47	+0.02
Turnout		9,109	87.88	-1.65
Eligible voters		10,365		
Liberal gain from Progressive Conservative		Swing		+13.20

1982 New Brunswick general election
Party	Candidate	Votes	%	±%
Progressive Conservative	Clarence Cormier	4,032	47.88	+28.46
Liberal	Bill Malenfant	3,951	46.92	-19.43
New Democratic	Ulysse Bastarache	438	5.20	+0.23
Total valid votes		8,421	99.51	
Total rejected ballots		38	0.45	-0.59
Turnout		8,459	89.53	+8.97
Eligible voters		9,448		
Progressive Conservative gain from Liberal		Swing		+23.94

1978 New Brunswick general election
Party	Candidate	Votes	%	±%
Liberal	Bill Malenfant	4,605	66.34	+5.47
Progressive Conservative	Euclide Daigle	1,348	19.42	-14.28
Parti acadien	Donatien Gaudet	643	9.26	+6.54
New Democratic	Joseph Eugene Guy LeBlanc	345	4.97	+2.26
Total valid votes		6,941	98.96	
Total rejected ballots		73	1.04	+0.42
Turnout		8,459	80.57	-5.61
Eligible voters		8,706		
Liberal hold		Swing		+9.88

1974 New Brunswick general election
Party	Candidate	Votes	%
Liberal	Bill Malenfant	3,869	60.87
Progressive Conservative	Euclide Daigle	2,142	33.70
Parti acadien	Rose-Anna LeBlanc	173	2.72
New Democratic	Donald Davidson	172	2.71
Total valid votes		6,356	99.37
Total rejected ballots		40	0.53
Turnout		6,396	86.18
Eligible voters		7,422	
The previous multi-member riding of Westmorland went totally Liberal in the previous election. Neither of the four incumbents ran in this election.

== See also ==
- List of New Brunswick provincial electoral districts
- Canadian provincial electoral districts
