= 2026 Green Party of New Brunswick leadership election =

Canadian political party leadership election

- December 5, 2026
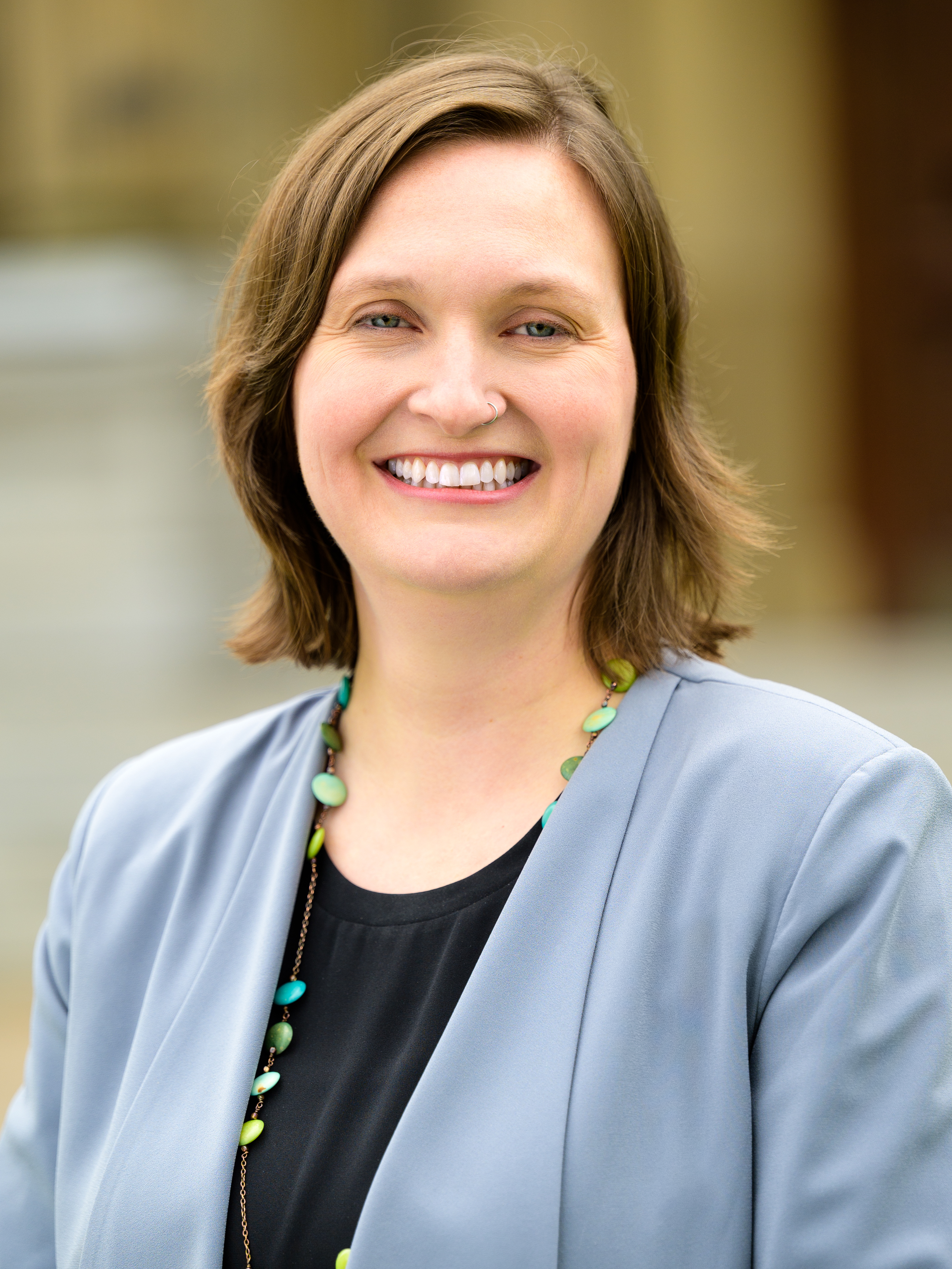
Candidate	Megan Mitton
Results	Acclaimed
leader before election
David Coon
Elected leader
Megan Mitton

2026 Green Party of New Brunswick leadership election
- Date: December 5, 2026
- Convention: Fredericton, New Brunswick
- Resigning leader: David Coon
- Won by: Megan Mitton
- Ballots: 1
- Candidates: 1 (+ none of the above)
- Entrance fee: $10,000
- Spending limit: $75,000

In 2026, the Green Party of New Brunswick will hold a leadership election to acclaim David Coon's successor. This will be the party's first leadership election since 2012. MLA Megan Mitton will be acclaimed leader on December 5 as the only candidate in the race.

== Timeline ==
- June 4, 2026 – David Coon announces his pending resignation as GPNB leader.
- July 14, 2026 – Party announces rules and a timeline for the leadership election.
- August 4, 2026 – Leadership applications open.
- September 28, 2026 – Candidates announced.
- October 14, 2026 – Endorsements deadline.
- October 14, 2026 – First $5000 fundraising installment due.
- November 17, 2026 – Second $5000 fundraising installment due.
- November 21, 2026 – Membership cut-off for voting eligibility.
- November 21, 2026 – Online voting opens.
- December 4, 2026 – Online voting and mail-in voting closes.
- December 5, 2026 – Leadership convention and in-person voting.

== Candidates ==
=== Approved ===
- Megan Mitton, MLA for Tantramar (2018–present)

==== Withdrawn ====
- Matt Toner, former deputy leader of the Green Party of British Columbia

=== Declined ===
- Kevin Arseneau, MLA for Kent North (2018–2024)
