= Office of the Attorney General (New Brunswick) =

Agency overview
- Formed: 2012
- Jurisdiction: New Brunswick
- Agency executive: Rob McKee, Attorney General
- Parent department: Government of New Brunswick

The Office of the Attorney General (French: Cabinet du procureur général) is a part of the government of New Brunswick. It is charged providing legal services to all departments and agencies of the government.

The post of attorney general is the most senior legal official in New Brunswick and has existed since the creation of New Brunswick as a crown colony in 1784 and for much of contemporary history the attorney general oversaw the Department of Justice carrying the dual title of Minister of Justice, as is currently the case. Loyalist Jonathan Bliss served as the first attorney general, beginning in the late eighteenth century.

From 2006 to 2012, the Office of the Attorney General was separated from the Department of Justice. On February 14, 2006 when Premier Bernard Lord restructured the cabinet, largely out of necessity, the basic functions of attorney general were separated from the Justice Department so as to allow Brad Green, the only lawyer in his caucus, to take on a larger portfolio. The Department of Justice and Consumer Affairs was established taking over responsibility for "protection of the public interest" from the Attorney General. On October 3, 2006, Bernard Lord left office and was replaced as Premier by Shawn Graham. Graham named T.J. Burke to be both Attorney General and Minister of Justice and Consumer Affairs, however in legislation to realign government departments passed on March 2, 2007 the Office of the Attorney General and the Department of Justice and Consumer Affairs remained separate entities. A subsequent bill was introduced on December 19, 2007 specifying the role of the Office of the Attorney General as a separate department.

However, the subsequent premier, David Alward, remerged the two departments into the Department of Justice and Attorney General in 2012. Alward again separated these roles in 2013, when Ted Flemming was named attorney general, with Troy Lifford becoming minister of justice.

== Attorneys general ==
Minister	Term
Ward Chipman (acting)	November, 1784 – May 15, 1785
Jonathan Bliss	February 2, 1785 (appointed) – June 28, 1809 (assumed office May 16)
Thomas Wetmore	July 26, 1809 – March 22, 1828
Robert Parker (acting)	March 1828 – September 7, 1828
Charles Jeffery Peters	September 7, 1828 – February 3, 1848
Lemuel Allan Wilmot	July 23, 1848 – January 8, 1851
J. A. Street	January 10, 1851 – November 1, 1854
Charles Fisher	November 1, 1854 – May 1856
John Hamilton Gray	June 21, 1856 – June 1857
Charles Fisher (2nd time)	June 1, 1857 – May 27, 1861?
A. J. Smith	April 27, 1861 – October 10, 1862
J. M. Johnson	1862–1865
J. C. Allen	April 1865 – September 21, 1865
A. J. Smith (2nd time)	September 21, 1865 – April 14, 1866
Charles Fisher (3rd time)	April 14, 1866 – September 1867
A.R. Wetmore	September 25, 1867 – May 25, 1870
George E. King	May 25, 1870 – May 3, 1878
J. J. Fraser	June 1878 – May 23, 1882
E. McLeod	May 23, 1882 – February 26, 1883
A.G. Blair	March 3, 1883 – July 17, 1896
James Mitchell	July 17, 1896 – October 29, 1897
A. S. White	November 3, 1897 – 1899
H. R. Emmerson	February 1900 – August 31, 1900
William Pugsley	September 1, 1900 – May 31, 1907
C. W. Robinson	May 31, 1907 – October 28, 1907
H. A. McKeown	October 28, 1907 – March 24, 1908
J. D. Hazen	March 24, 1908 – October 10, 1911
W.C.H. Grimmer	October 16, 1911 – January 22, 1914?
George J. Clarke	January 22, 1914 – December 17, 1914
J. B. M. Baxter	December 17, 1914 – April 4, 1917?
J. P. Byrne	April 4, 1917 – October 4, 1924?
I. C. Rand	October 4, 1924 – September 10, 1925
J.B.M. Baxter (2nd time)	September 10, 1925 – May 18, 1931
C. D. Richards	May 18, 1931 – 1933
W. H. Harrison	1933 – July 16, 1935
John B. McNair	July 16, 1935 – March 13, 1940
John B. McNair (cont'd)	March 13, 1940 – October 8, 1952
William J. West	October 8, 1952 – October 17, 1958
R. G. L. Fairweather	October 17, 1958 – July 12, 1960
Louis Robichaud	July 12, 1960 – May 13, 1965
Wendell W. Meldrum	May 13, 1965 – April 5, 1966
Bernard A. Jean	April 6, 1966 – November 12, 1970
John B. M. Baxter, Jr.	November 12, 1970 – December 3, 1974
Paul Creaghan	December 3, 1974 – March 16, 1977
Rodman Logan	March 22, 1977 – October 30, 1982
Fernand G. Dubé	October 30, 1982 – October 3, 1985
David Clark	October 3, 1985 – October 27, 1987
James E. Lockyer	October 27, 1987 – October 9, 1991
Edmond Blanchard	October 9, 1991 – September 26, 1995
Paul Duffie	September 26, 1995 – March 20, 1997
Bernard Richard (acting)	March 20, 1997 – July 23, 1997
James E. Lockyer (2nd time)	July 23, 1997 – May 14, 1998
Greg Byrne	May 14, 1998 – June 21, 1999
Brad Green	June 27, 1999 – October 3, 2006
Thomas J. Burke	October 3, 2006 – June 22, 2009
Michael Murphy	June 22, 2009 – January 4, 2010
Kelly Lamrock	January 4, 2010 – September 26, 2010
Marie-Claude Blais	October 12, 2010 – September 23, 2013
Hugh (Ted) Flemming	September 23, 2013 – October 7, 2014
Serge Rousselle	October 7, 2014 – May 11, 2018
Brian Gallant	May 11, 2018 – November 9, 2018
Andrea Anderson-Mason	November 9, 2018 – September 29, 2020
Hugh (Ted) Flemming (2nd time)	September 29, 2020 – November 2, 2024
Rob McKee	November 2, 2024–present
