= Moncton Southwest =

Electoral district in New Brunswick, Canada

New Brunswick electoral district
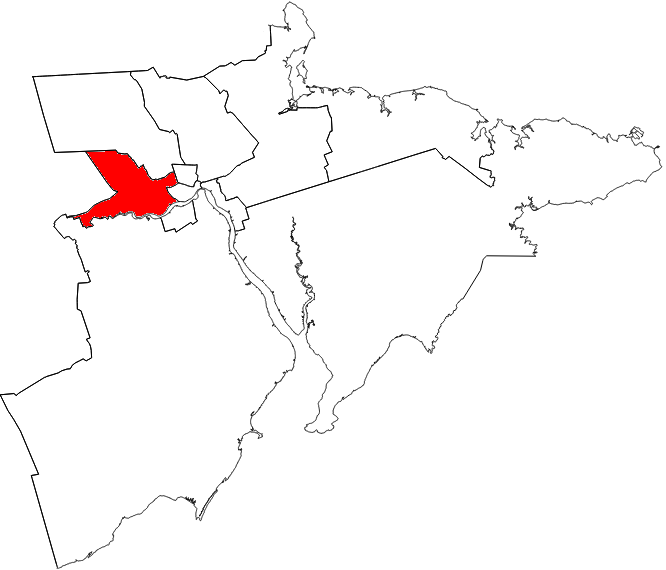
- The riding of Moncton Southwest in relation to other southeastern New Brunswick electoral districts
- Coordinates: 46.085°N 64.916°W

Defunct provincial electoral district
- Legislature: Legislative Assembly of New Brunswick
- District created: 2013
- District abolished: 2023
- First contested: 2014
- Last contested: 2020

Demographics
- Population (2011): 15,669
- Electors (2013): 11,106
- Census division: Westmorland
- Census subdivision: Moncton

Moncton Southwest (French: Moncton-Sud-Ouest) was a provincial electoral district for the Legislative Assembly of New Brunswick, Canada. It was contested in the 2014 general election, having been created in the 2013 redistribution of electoral boundaries.

The district included the southwestern corner of the city of Moncton and some surrounding communities. It was created out of parts of the old districts of Moncton North, Petitcodiac, Moncton West and Moncton Crescent.

== Members of the Legislative Assembly ==
Assembly	Years	Member	Party
Riding created from Moncton North, Petitcodiac, Moncton West and Moncton Crescent
58th	2014–2018	Sherry Wilson	Progressive Conservative
59th	2018–2020	Sherry Wilson	Progressive Conservative
60th	2020–2024	Sherry Wilson	Progressive Conservative
Riding dissolved into Moncton Centre, Moncton Northwest, Arcadia-Butternut Valley-Maple Hills, Moncton South, Sussex-Three Rivers and Albert-Riverview

== Election results ==
2020 New Brunswick general election
Party	Candidate	Votes	%	±%
Progressive Conservative	Sherry Wilson	3,679	52.13	10.39
Liberal	René Ephestion	1,561	22.12	-16.00
Green	Claire Kelly	927	13.13	+0.17
People's Alliance	Susan Matthews	667	9.45	--
New Democratic	Juliana McIntosh	224	3.17	-4.02
Total valid votes		7,058		
Total rejected ballots		12	0.17	-0.33
Turnout		7,070	58.47	+0.59
Eligible voters		12,081		
Progressive Conservative hold		Swing		+13.20
Source: Elections New Brunswick

2018 New Brunswick general election
Party	Candidate	Votes	%	±%
Progressive Conservative	Sherry Wilson	2,920	41.73	+2.97
Liberal	Susy Campos	2,667	38.11	+3.14
Green	Sarah Colwell	907	12.96	+6.93
New Democratic	Hailey Duffy	503	7.19	-10.17
Total valid votes		6,997	100.0	
Total rejected ballots		35	0.50	
Turnout		7,032	57.98	
Eligible voters		12,128		
Source: Elections New Brunswick

2014 New Brunswick general election
Party	Candidate	Votes	%
Progressive Conservative	Sherry Wilson	2,523	38.80
Liberal	Tyson Milner	2,274	34.97
New Democratic	Charles Doucet	1,129	17.36
Green	Mathieu Pierre LaPlante	392	6.03
People's Alliance	Lucy Goguen	184	2.83
Total valid votes		6,502	100.0
Total rejected ballots		26	0.40
Turnout		6,528	54.77
Eligible voters		11,919	
This riding was created from parts of Moncton North, Petitcodiac, Moncton West and Moncton Crescent, all of which elected Progressive Conservatives in the previous election. Sherry Wilson was the incumbent from Petitcodiac.
Source: Elections New Brunswick
