= 2002 New Brunswick Liberal Association leadership election =

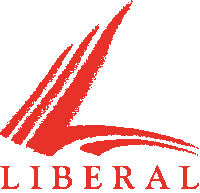
- Date: May 12, 2002
- Convention: Fredericton
- Resigning leader: Camille Thériault
- Won by: Shawn Graham
- Ballots: 1
- Candidates: 2

The New Brunswick Liberal Association held a leadership election in 2002 to replace former leader Camille Thériault with a new leader to lead the party into the 2003 election. Shawn Graham was elected over Jack MacDougall, after a number of high-profile candidates decided not to seek the leadership or had dropped out.

== Candidates ==
- Shawn Graham, MLA since 1998 and son of former long-time MLA and deputy premier Alan Graham.
- Jack MacDougall, former executive director of the party.

=== Withdrawn candidate ===
- Paul Duffie, MLA from 1987 to 1999 and cabinet minister from 1991 to 1997. Duffie contested delegate selection meetings but withdrew before the convention.

=== Non candidates ===
The following candidates were rumoured to be considering runs but did not enter the race.

- Greg Byrne, MLA from 1995 to 1999, cabinet minister from 1997 to 1999 and 1998 leadership runner up.
- Steve MacKinnon, former executive director of the party.
- Francis McGuire, former aide to premier Frank McKenna and former deputy minister of economic development.
- Mike Murphy, former president of the party.
- Bernard Richard, MLA since 1991, cabinet minister from 1995 to 1998, 1998 leadership candidate and interim leader.

== Results ==
The leadership contest was conducted in two-tiers. First, Liberal members voted in their ridings for their leadership candidate of choice, after which delegates from each riding were elected proportionally to the votes of their members. Second, delegates voted at the May convention.

=== Delegate selection meetings ===
Liberal delegate selection results Feb. to Mar., 2002
| Candidate | % of delegates |
|---|---|
| Shawn Graham | 48.0 |
| Paul Duffie | 35.6 |
| Jack MacDougall | 8.4 |
| uncommitted | 7.1 |

=== Convention ===
2002 Liberal leadership convention results May 12, 2002
| Candidate | Votes | % |
|---|---|---|
| Shawn Graham | 1,349 | 74.5 |
| Jack MacDougall | 461 | 25.5 |
