= Bill Harmer =

Canadian politician (born 1937)

MLA for Petitcodiac
- In office 1974–1987
- Succeeded by: Hollis Steeves

Personal details
- Born: January 18, 1937 (age 89) Saint John, New Brunswick
- Party: Progressive Conservative Party of New Brunswick
- Spouse: Prudence Myrna Ritchie
- Occupation: Farm Machinery Dealer

Charles William E. Harmer (born January 18, 1937) is a Canadian politician. He served in the Legislative Assembly of New Brunswick from 1974 to 1987, as a Progressive Conservative member for the constituency of Petitcodiac.
