= Clarence Cormier =

Canadian politician

MLA for Memramcook
- In office 1982–1987
- Preceded by: Bill Malenfant
- Succeeded by: Greg O'Donnell

Mayor of Dieppe
- In office 1977-1983
- Preceded by: Bill Malenfant
- Succeeded by: Bill Malenfant

Personal details
- Born: July 14, 1930 Saint-Antoine, New Brunswick
- Died: April 26, 2012 (aged 81) Moncton, New Brunswick
- Party: Progressive Conservative Party of New Brunswick
- Spouse: Bernette Cormier
- Children: 4

Clarence J. Cormier (July 14, 1930 – April 26, 2012) was a Canadian politician. He served in the Legislative Assembly of New Brunswick from 1982 to 1987, as a Progressive Conservative member for the constituency of Memramcook. He was minister of education from 1982 to 1985, and was the first Acadian to occupy that position. He was also mayor of Dieppe, New Brunswick from 1977 to 1983.
