= Megan Mitton =

Canadian politician (born 1986)

Megan Mitton MLA
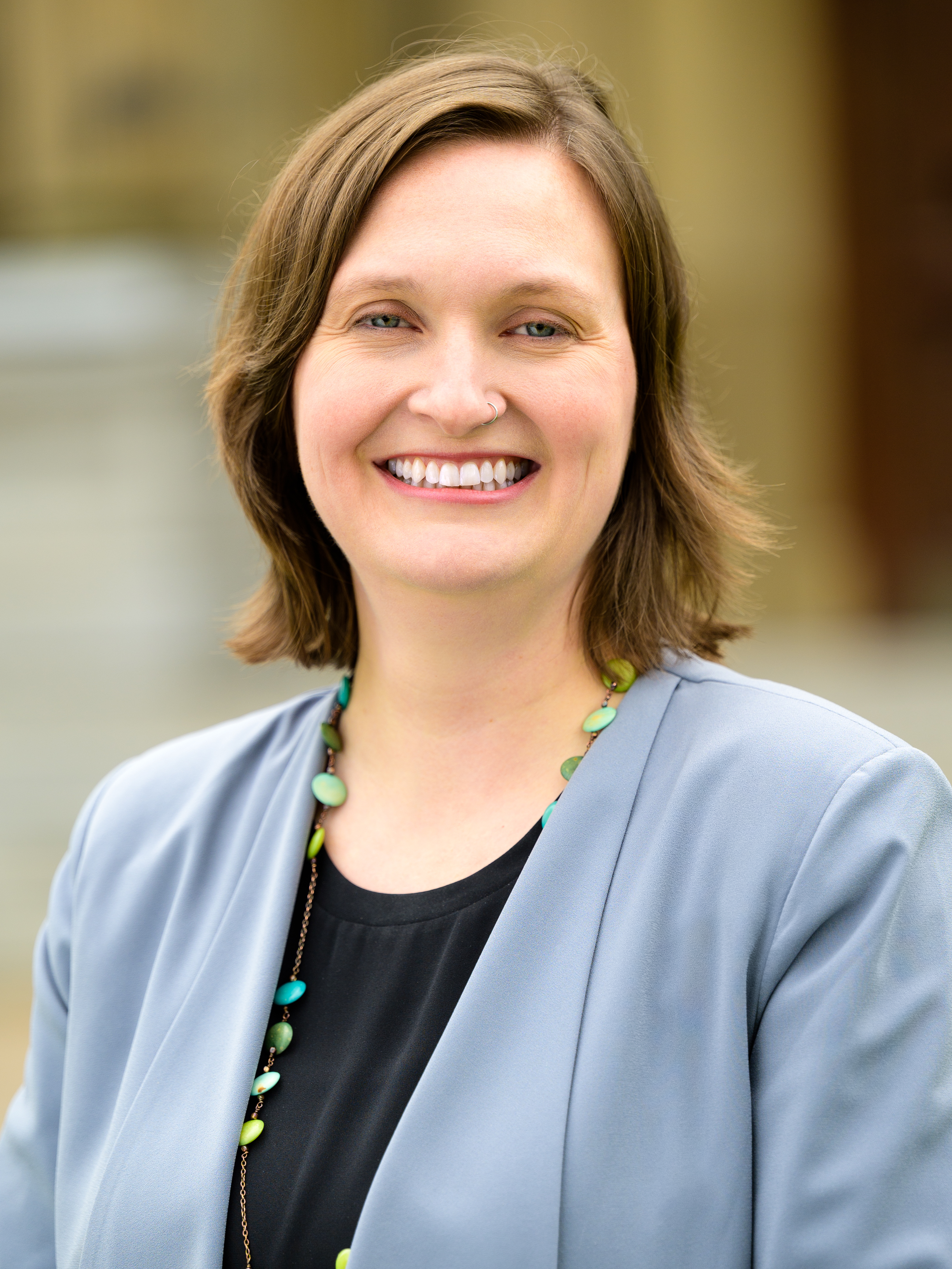
- Mitton in 2023

Leader-designate of the Green Party of New Brunswick
- Assuming office December 5, 2026
- Succeeding: David Coon

Member of the New Brunswick Legislative Assembly for Memramcook-Tantramar
- Incumbent
- Assumed office September 24, 2018
- Preceded by: Bernard LeBlanc

Co-deputy leader of the Green Party of New Brunswick
- Incumbent
- Assumed office September 14, 2023; Serving with Kevin Arseneau

Personal details
- Born: May 2, 1986 (age 40) Moncton, New Brunswick, Canada
- Party: Green
- Children: 2
- Education: McGill University

Megan Mitton (born May 2, 1986) is a Canadian politician, who was elected to the Legislative Assembly of New Brunswick in the 2018 election. She represents the electoral district of Memramcook-Tantramar as a member of the Green Party, of which she is one of the deputy leaders.

== Early life and education ==
Mitton grew up in Sackville and graduated from Tantramar Regional High School. She earned her Bachelor of Arts at McGill University where she studied international development, political science and women’s studies.

== Political career ==
Mitton ran as the Green Party candidate in the 2014 election, finishing third behind Bernard LeBlanc and incumbent Mike Olscamp.

In 2016, Mitton was elected to serve as a Sackville Town Councillor. She served on the committees for Tourism and Business Development, Corporate Affairs and Strategic Development, the Sackville Arts Wall, Public Safety, and Policy and By-law.

Mitton was first elected to the Legislative Assembly of New Brunswick on September 24, 2018. She became the first Green MLA to be elected in her riding, the first woman elected as a Green MLA in New Brunswick history, and one of the first 10 Green parliamentarians elected in Canada.

Mitton was re-elected to the 60th Legislature on September 14, 2020. Mitton is a member of the Standing Committees on Public Accounts, Climate Change and Environmental Stewardship, Private Bills, and Social Policy. She is also the Green Caucus Advocate on matters of Healthy and Inclusive Communities, Climate Justice, and Education.

On September 14, 2023, Mitton as well as Kevin Arseneau were both appointed as Deputy Leaders of the Green Party of New Brunswick.

Mitton announced her candidacy in the 2026 Green Party of New Brunswick leadership election in September 2026, and will be acclaimed party leader in December.

== Electoral record ==
2024 New Brunswick general election: Tantramar
Party	Candidate	Votes	%	±%
Green	Megan Mitton	2,468	48.9%	+7.29
Liberal	John Higham	1,276	25.3%	-9.96
Progressive Conservative	Bruce Phinney	1,166	23.1%	+2.71
New Democratic	Evelyne Godfrey	84	1.7%	
Libertarian	Donna Allen	57	1.1%	
Total valid votes		5,051		
Total rejected ballots				
Turnout				
Eligible voters				
Green hold		Swing		
Source: Elections New Brunswick

2020 New Brunswick general election
Party	Candidate	Votes	%	±%
Green	Megan Mitton	3,425	41.61	+3.28
Liberal	Maxime Bourgeois	2,902	35.26	-2.94
Progressive Conservative	Carole Duguay	1,678	20.39	+1.90
People's Alliance	Heathere Collins	192	2.33	
Independent	Jefferson George Wright	34	0.41	
Total valid votes		8,231		
Total rejected ballots		13	0.16	-0.13
Turnout		8,244	70.36	+1.03
Eligible voters		11,717		
Green hold		Swing		+3.11
Source: Elections New Brunswick

2018 New Brunswick general election
Party	Candidate	Votes	%	±%
Green	Megan Mitton	3,148	38.33	+23.03
Liberal	Bernard LeBlanc	3,137	38.20	-7.44
Progressive Conservative	Etienne Gaudet	1,518	18.48	-7.96
New Democratic	Hélène Boudreau	410	4.99	-7.63
Total valid votes		8,213	99.71	
Total rejected ballots		24	0.29	-0.17
Turnout		8,237	69.33	
Eligible voters		11,881		
Green gain from Liberal		Swing		+15.24

2014 New Brunswick general election
Party	Candidate	Votes	%	±%
Liberal	Bernard LeBlanc	3,515	45.64	+26.67
Progressive Conservative	Mike Olscamp	2,037	26.45	-30.23
Green	Megan Mitton	1,178	15.29	+1.64
New Democratic	Hélène Boudreau	972	12.62	+1.92
Total valid votes		7,702	100.0	
Total rejected ballots		36	0.47	
Turnout		7,738	66.56	
Eligible voters		11,626		
Liberal notional gain from Progressive Conservative		Swing		+28.45
Source: Elections New Brunswick
