= Wally Stiles =

Canadian politician

R. Wallis "Wally" Stiles

Member of the New Brunswick Legislative Assembly for Petitcodiac
- In office June 7, 1999 – September 27, 2010
- Preceded by: Hollis Steeves
- Succeeded by: Sherry Wilson

Personal details
- Born: October 18, 1950 (age 75) Sussex, New Brunswick
- Party: Progressive Conservative (1999–2007); Liberal (2007–present)
- Spouse: Joan MacAlpine

R. Wallis "Wally" Stiles (born October 18, 1950 in Sussex, New Brunswick, Canada) is a New Brunswick politician. He represented the electoral district of Petitcodiac in the Legislative Assembly of New Brunswick from 1999–2010. On September 17, 2005, he married fellow MLA Joan MacAlpine making them the first husband and wife to serve together in the New Brunswick legislature.

== Early life ==
A 1973 graduate of the University of New Brunswick with a Bachelor of Business Administration degree, he worked for various companies as a controller and also managed his own private woodlot where he produced maple sugar.

== Local politics ==
He was involved with his local riding association for some years and was elected to Petitcodiac municipal council in 1995 and 1998. In 1998, he received the most votes of any of the candidates of councillor which entitled him to the position of deputy mayor.

== Provincial political career ==
He was elected to the legislature in the 1999 provincial election and served as chairman of the select committee on private passenger automobile insurance in 2002-2003. This committee was charged with investigating the surging insurance rates in the province and making recommendations to curb and reduce them; something that would become a major issue in the 2003 election.

Stiles was re-elected in 2003 and would serve as vice-chairman of the select committee to study public auto insurance which was chaired by New Brunswick New Democratic Party leader Elizabeth Weir. In late February 2006 he became the whip and caucus chair for his party. This was following a cabinet shuffle on February 14, 2006 in which incumbent caucus chair Jody Carr was named to cabinet and the crossing of the floor of Michael Malley on February 17, 2006, who had been serving as Progressive Conservative whip.

On April 17, 2007, he announced that he would cross the floor to join the Liberal party, along with his wife and fellow MLA Joan MacAlpine. On October 31, 2007, he was named to the Liberal cabinet.

In the 2010 general election, Stiles was defeated by Progressive Conservative Sherry Wilson.

== Sources ==
- Stiles' official bio
- 1998 New Brunswick Municipal Election results (pdf)
- CBC coverage of the 2003 New Brunswick election

New Brunswick provincial government of Shawn Graham
Cabinet posts (2)
Predecessor	Office	Successor
Donald Arseneault	Minister of Natural Resources; 2008–2010	Bruce Northrup
Hédard Albert	Minister of Human Resources; 2007–2008	Rick Brewer
