= Mike Olscamp =

Canadian politician

Michael Olscamp

Member of the New Brunswick Legislative Assembly for Tantramar
- In office September 18, 2006 – September 27, 2014
- Preceded by: Peter Mesheau
- Succeeded by: Bernard LeBlanc

Minister of Agriculture, Aquaculture and Fisheries
- In office October 12, 2010 – October 7, 2014
- Premier: David Alward
- Preceded by: Ronald Ouellette; Rick Doucet
- Succeeded by: Rick Doucet

Personal details
- Born: Campbellton, New Brunswick
- Political party: Progressive Conservative
- Spouse: Karen
- Occupation: teacher, politician

Michael Robert Olscamp is a politician in the province of New Brunswick, Canada, and a retired teacher. He was elected to the Legislative Assembly of New Brunswick in the 2006 election as the Progressive Conservative MLA for Tantramar. He did not win re-election in 2014.

== Biography ==
He graduated from Campbellton Composite High School and then achieved journeyman status as an electrician. In 1972–73, he enrolled in the Vocational Teacher Training Program at the New Brunswick Institute of Technology in Moncton. He then went on to earn a Bachelor of Education from the University of Moncton.

Olscamp taught vocational education at Tantramar Regional High School in Sackville. After teaching he was vice-principal of the high school in the 1980s. He was then recruited as Director of Inmate Programs at minimum security Westmorland Institution in Dorchester.

He decided to return to a career in the field of public education by teaching at Port Elgin Regional Memorial School for four years. He then returned to Tantramar Regional High School and taught French.

A sports enthusiast, Olscamp spent three decades coaching the Tantramar area youth. He coached basketball from the elementary through high school levels winning three provincial championships at the high school level. Prior to being elected to the Legislative Assembly of New Brunswick, he served as the assistant coach of the Mount Allison Mounties Men's basketball team.

He is married to Karen and has two sons, Andrew and William.
