= Rob McKee =

Canadian politician

The Honourable Rob McKee KC MLA

Attorney General of New Brunswick
- Incumbent
- Assumed office November 2, 2024
- Premier: Susan Holt
- Preceded by: Ted Flemming

Minister of Justice
- Incumbent
- Assumed office November 2, 2024
- Premier: Susan Holt
- Preceded by: Ted Flemming

Leader of the Opposition of New Brunswick
- In office September 21, 2022 – May 9, 2023
- Preceded by: Roger Melanson
- Succeeded by: Susan Holt

Member of the New Brunswick Legislative Assembly for Moncton Centre
- Incumbent
- Assumed office September 24, 2018
- Preceded by: Chris Collins

Personal details
- Born: November 20, 1985 (age 40) Moncton, New Brunswick, Canada
- Party: Liberal
- Spouse: Tara McKee
- Children: 2
- Education: Université de Moncton
- Occupation: Politician; lawyer

Robert McKee KC MLA (born November 20, 1985) is a Canadian politician who was elected to the Legislative Assembly of New Brunswick in the 2018 election. He represents the electoral district of Moncton Centre as a member of the Liberal Party. He was re-elected in the 2020 and 2024 provincial elections. He was the leader of the opposition in New Brunswick from September 2022 to May 2023.

== Education ==
Fluently bilingual in English and French, his education includes a Bachelor of Laws from Université de Moncton, a Bachelor of Applied Management in Accounting from the University of New Brunswick in Saint John, a Diploma in Accounting from the New Brunswick Community College and a high school diploma from the Athol Murray College of Notre Dame in Wilcox, Saskatchewan.

== Political career ==
Prior to his election in the legislature, he served as a city councillor for Moncton City Council, elected in 2016.

McKee became Leader of the Official Opposition in the New Brunswick legislature after the election of Susan Holt as New Brunswick Liberal Party leader in September 2022, since Holt did not yet have a seat in the legislature. In April 2023 Holt won a by-election and became a member of the legislature, which enabled her to take the post of Leader of the Official Opposition in May.

McKee has held the critic portfolios for Health, Justice and Attorney General and Finance and Treasury Board. Also a lawyer, he practiced at Fowler Law in Moncton.

McKee was re-elected in the 2024 general election. On November 1, 2024, it was announced that he was placed in cabinet as Minister of Justice, Attorney General, and Minister responsible for Addictions and Mental Health Services.

== Personal life ==
He is married to Tara (Pobihushchy) McKee with two children, Michael and Anna.

McKee is a third generation McKee to be elected to the New Brunswick Legislature as his father and grandfather were both Members of the Legislative Assembly. Michael McKee represented Moncton North from 1974 to 1993 and Killeen McKee represented Kent from 1940 to 1950.

== Electoral record ==
2024 New Brunswick general election: Moncton Centre
Party	Candidate	Votes	%	±%
Liberal	Rob McKee	3,501	56.54	+26.4
Progressive Conservative	Dave Melanson	1,738	28.07	-9.9
Green	Sarah Colwell	711	11.48	-10.5
New Democratic	James Ryan	242	3.91	+0.5
Total valid votes		6,192	99.74	
Total rejected ballots		16	0.26	
Turnout		6,208	56.50	
Eligible voters		10,988		
Liberal notional gain from Progressive Conservative		Swing		+18.2
Source: Elections New Brunswick

2020 New Brunswick general election
Party	Candidate	Votes	%	±%
Liberal	Rob McKee	2,448	38.91	-4.68
Green	Carole Chan	1,725	27.42	+14.96
Progressive Conservative	Jean Poirier	1,642	26.10	+10.23
People's Alliance	Aaron Richter	308	4.90	-0.10
New Democratic	James Caldwell	168	2.67	-1.03
Total valid votes		6,291		
Total rejected ballots		15	0.24	-0.00
Turnout		6,306	59.27	+1.08
Eligible voters		10,639		
Liberal hold		Swing		-9.82
Source: Elections New Brunswick

2018 New Brunswick general election
Party	Candidate	Votes	%	±%
Liberal	Rob McKee	2,698	43.59	-9.39
Independent	Chris Collins	1,200	19.39	
Progressive Conservative	Claudette Boudreau-Turner	982	15.87	-9.35
Green	Jean-Marie Nadeau	771	12.46	+4.40
People's Alliance	Kevin McClure	309	4.99	
New Democratic	Jessica Caissie	229	3.70	-10.04
Total valid votes		6,189	99.76	
Total rejected ballots		15	0.24	-0.20
Turnout		6,204	59.11	+0.72
Eligible voters		10,495		
Liberal hold		Swing		-14.39
