= List of mayors of Dieppe, New Brunswick =

This is a list of mayors of Dieppe, New Brunswick. The current mayor is Yvon Lapierre, who started his current term in 2012. His most recent re-election was in 2021.

== Mayors ==
#	Name	Term start	Term end	Notes
1st	Adélard Savoie	1952	1953	
2nd	Alphée J. LeBlanc	1954	1956	
3rd	Régis LeBlanc	1956	1971	
4th	William Malenfant	1971	1977	
5th	Clarence Cormier	1977	1983	
6th	William Malenfant	1983	1998	
7th	Yvon Lapierre	1998	2005	
8th	Achille Maillet	2005	2008	
9th	Jean LeBlanc	2008	2012	
10th	Yvon Lapierre	2012	still incumbent	
