= Fredericton-Nashwaaksis =

Defunct provincial electoral district in New Brunswick, Canada

New Brunswick electoral district
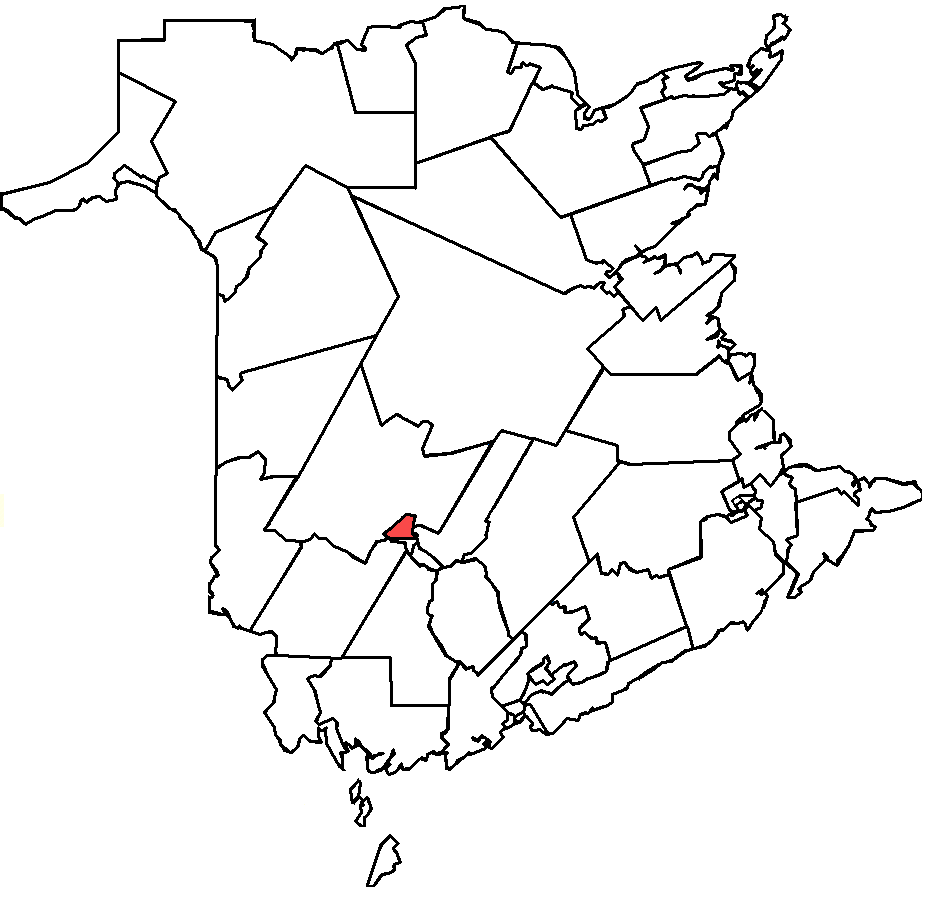
- Coordinates: 46.007°N 66.710°W

Defunct provincial electoral district
- Legislature: Legislative Assembly of New Brunswick
- District created: 2006
- District abolished: 2013
- First contested: 2006
- Last contested: 2010

Demographics
- Population (2001): 14,304
- Electors: 11,165
- Census division: York County
- Census subdivision(s): City of Fredericton, Parish of Douglas, Parish of Estey's Bridge, Parish of St. Mary's

Fredericton-Nashwaaksis was a provincial electoral district for the Legislative Assembly of New Brunswick, Canada. It was first created in the 2006 redrawing of electoral districts and was first used in the general election later that year.

== History ==
It was created in 2006 as a result of rapid population growth in the city of Fredericton north of the Saint John River. It includes those parts of the old Fredericton North district that were west of the Westmorland Street Bridge as well as some suburban communities previously in the district of Mactaquac.

== Members of the Legislative Assembly ==
Assembly	Years	Member	Party
Riding created from Fredericton North and Mactaquac
56th	2006–2010	T.J. Burke	Liberal
57th	2010–2014	Troy Lifford	Progressive Conservative
Riding dissolved into Fredericton North and Fredericton-York

== Election results ==
2010 New Brunswick general election
Party	Candidate	Votes	%	±%
Progressive Conservative	Troy Lifford	3,720	47.56	+0.57
Liberal	T.J. Burke	2,760	35.29	-13.85
Green	Jack MacDougall	741	9.47	–
New Democratic	Dana Brown	601	7.68	+3.81
Total valid votes		7,822	100.0	
Total rejected ballots		32	0.41	
Turnout		7,854	69.93	
Eligible voters		11,232		
Progressive Conservative gain from Liberal		Swing		+7.21
Source: Elections New Brunswick

2006 New Brunswick general election
Party	Candidate	Votes	%	±%
Liberal	T.J. Burke	3,883	49.14	
Progressive Conservative	Mike Smith	3,713	46.99	
New Democratic	Aaron Doucette	306	3.87	
Total valid votes		7,902	100.0	
Liberal notional gain		Swing		

* This was a new district being contested for the first time, being made up in parts from the former districts of Fredericton North and Mactaquac. The majority of the district came from Fredericton North, which had been held by the Liberals, while Mactaquac had been held by the Progressive Conservatives. Burke was the incumbent from Fredericton North.

== See also ==
- List of New Brunswick provincial electoral districts
- Canadian provincial electoral districts
