= Bernard LeBlanc =

Canadian politician

Bernard LeBlanc MLA

Member of the New Brunswick Legislative Assembly for Memramcook-Lakeville-Dieppe
- In office September 18, 2006 – September 22, 2014
- Preceded by: Position established
- Succeeded by: Riding redistributed

Member of the New Brunswick Legislative Assembly for Memramcook-Tantramar
- In office September 22, 2014 – September 24, 2018
- Preceded by: Position established
- Succeeded by: Megan Mitton

Personal details
- Party: Liberal

Bernard R. LeBlanc (born 1949) is a politician in the province of New Brunswick, Canada. He was elected to the Legislative Assembly of New Brunswick in the 2006 election as the Liberal MLA for the new district of Memramcook-Lakeville-Dieppe.

He was appointed to cabinet on November 12, 2008.

On February 11, 2010, LeBlanc resigned from cabinet, amid allegations that an email he sent violated the privacy rights of a Fredericton-area woman by revealing private information about her.

New Brunswick provincial government of Shawn Graham
Cabinet posts (2)
| Predecessor | Office | Successor |
|---|---|---|
| Mike Murphy | Minister of Justice and Consumer Affairs; January 4, 2010 – February 11, 2010 | Marie-Claude Blais |
| Carmel Robichaud | Minister of Local Government; 2008–2010 | Chris Collins |
