= Lloyd Folkins =

Canadian politician (1913–1994)

Member of the Legislative Assembly of New Brunswick
- In office 1964–1982
- Succeeded by: Robert Hall
- Constituency: Tantramar

Personal details
- Born: September 24, 1913 Salisbury, New Brunswick
- Died: September 7, 1994 (aged 81)
- Party: Progressive Conservative Party of New Brunswick
- Spouse: Hilda Marion Dobbin
- Children: 4
- Occupation: accountant, farmer

Lloyd George Folkins (February 24, 1913 – September 7, 1994) was a Canadian politician. He served in the Legislative Assembly of New Brunswick from 1974 to 1982 as a member of the Progressive Conservative party from the constituency of Tantramar.

In 1996, Squire Street in Sackville, NB was renamed Folkins Drive in honour of Lloyd G. Folkins, former mayor and MLA for Tantramar.
