= Bill Malenfant =

Canadian politician

MLA for Memramcook
- In office 1974–1982
- Succeeded by: Clarence Cormier

Mayor of Dieppe
- In office 1971-1977
- Preceded by: Régis LeBlanc
- Succeeded by: Clarence Cormier

Mayor of Dieppe
- In office 1983-1998
- Preceded by: Clarence Cormier
- Succeeded by: Yvon Lapierre

Personal details
- Born: June 16, 1929 Dieppe, New Brunswick
- Died: December 16, 2016 (aged 87) Dr. Georges-L.-Dumont University Hospital Centre, Moncton
- Party: New Brunswick Liberal Association

William Malenfant (June 16, 1929 – December 16, 2016) was a Canadian politician. He served in the Legislative Assembly of New Brunswick from 1974 to 1982, as a Liberal member for the constituency of Memramcook. He was also a former mayor of Dieppe, New Brunswick.

Malenfant died on December 16, 2016, at the age of 87.
