= Marie-Claude Blais =

Canadian politician

The Honourable Marie-Claude Blais

Justice of the Court of Queen's Bench of New Brunswick
- Incumbent
- Assumed office May 5, 2015
- Nominated by: Peter MacKay
- Premier: Brian Gallant
- Preceded by: Peter S. Glennie

Member of the New Brunswick Legislative Assembly for Moncton North
- In office October 12, 2010 – September 22, 2014
- Preceded by: Mike Murphy
- Succeeded by: Chris Collins

New Brunswick Attorney General
- In office October 12, 2010 – September 19, 2013
- Preceded by: Kelly Lamrock
- Succeeded by: Ted Flemming

New Brunswick Minister of Justice
- In office October 12, 2010 – September 19, 2013
- Preceded by: Bernard LeBlanc
- Succeeded by: Troy Lifford

Minister of Education and Early Childhood Development
- In office September 19, 2013 – October 7, 2014
- Preceded by: Jody Carr
- Succeeded by: Serge Rousselle

Personal details
- Party: Progressive Conservative
- Profession: Lawyer/Judge

Marie-Claude Blais is a Canadian politician, who was elected to the Legislative Assembly of New Brunswick in the 2010 provincial election. She represented the electoral district of Moncton North as a member of the Progressive Conservatives from 2010 to 2014.

Blais is a graduate in law from the Université de Moncton and the Université de Sherbrooke, and has practised law for 12 years. She has been a member of the Progressive Conservative Party of New Brunswick since 1997, and served as party executive director and legal counsel for several years.

In addition to her professional activities, Blais is active in the Moncton community, and involved in parish and local community organizations. She has also participated in the organization of the campaign to finance the renovation of Aberdeen Cultural Centre, an important site of Acadian cultural life in the region.

She was sworn in on October 12, 2010 to the positions of Attorney-General and Minister of Justice and Consumer Affairs of New Brunswick in the government of David Alward. She was defeated in the 2014 general election by Liberal Chris Collins.

In May 2015, she was appointed Justice of the Court of the Queens Bench of New Brunswick.
