= 2007 Moncton East provincial by-election =

← 2006	March 5, 2007	2010 →

Moncton East riding
- Turnout: N/A
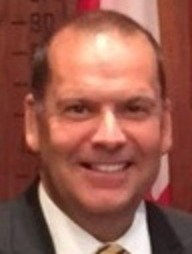
	First party	Second party	Third party
		PC	NDP
Candidate	Chris Collins	Chad Peters	Hélène Lapointe
Party	Liberal	Progressive Conservative	New Democratic
Popular vote	21,113	1,508	373
Percentage	58.3%	33.4%	8.3%
Swing	▲17.7%	▼21.4%	▲3.7%
MLA before election
Bernard Lord
Progressive Conservative
Subsequent MLA
Chris Collins
Liberal

A provincial by-election was held in New Brunswick on March 5, 2007 to fill the vacancy in the Legislative Assembly riding of Moncton East.

As a result of Bernard Lord's resignation, a by-election had to be called within six months of January 31, 2007. The date was set for March 5, 2007. The governing Liberals were hopeful that they could win the seat as it was held by Liberal Ray Frenette from 1974 to 1998 and because they are showing strength in recent opinion polls across the province.

== Candidates ==
- The Liberal leader, Premier Shawn Graham, said he would not interfere in the nomination process, leaving it up to the riding to determine a candidate but that, as he has only three women in his caucus, he added that he "will be actively searching for women to run". Of the three candidates there were two men (Chris Collins, Daniel LeBlanc) and one woman (Gilberte Losier). Chris Collins, a Moncton city councillor, was nominated as the Liberal candidate.
- Chad Peters, a staffer with the Conservative Party's legislative office, and a former Elvis impersonator, was nominated on February 10, 2007.
- Hélène Lapointe, a former president of the New Brunswick New Democratic Party, was acclaimed her party's nominee on February 17, 2007.

== Results ==
By-election on March 5, 2007
Party	Candidate	Votes	%	±%
Liberal	Chris Collins	2,628	58.3%	+17.7%
Progressive Conservative	Chad Peters	1,508	33.4%	-21.4%
New Democratic	Hélène Lapointe	373	8.3%	+3.7%
