= Moncton Centre (electoral district) =

Provincial electoral district in New Brunswick, Canada

New Brunswick electoral district
- The riding of Moncton Centre (as it exists from 2023) in relation to other New Brunswick electoral districts
- Coordinates: 46.114°N 64.801°W

Provincial electoral district
- Legislature: Legislative Assembly of New Brunswick
MLA
Rob McKee
Liberal
- District created: 2013
- First contested: 2014
- Last contested: 2024

Demographics
- Population (2011): 15,273
- Electors (2013): 11,368
- Census division: Westmorland
- Census subdivision: Moncton

Moncton Centre is a provincial electoral district for the Legislative Assembly of New Brunswick, Canada. It was contested in the 2014 general election, having been created in the 2013 redistribution of electoral boundaries.

The district includes the geographic centre of Moncton, but excludes the downtown which falls in Moncton South.

It draws about 60% of its population from the old Moncton East and about 40% from the old district of Moncton North. Moncton East incumbent Chris Collins won the 2014 election.

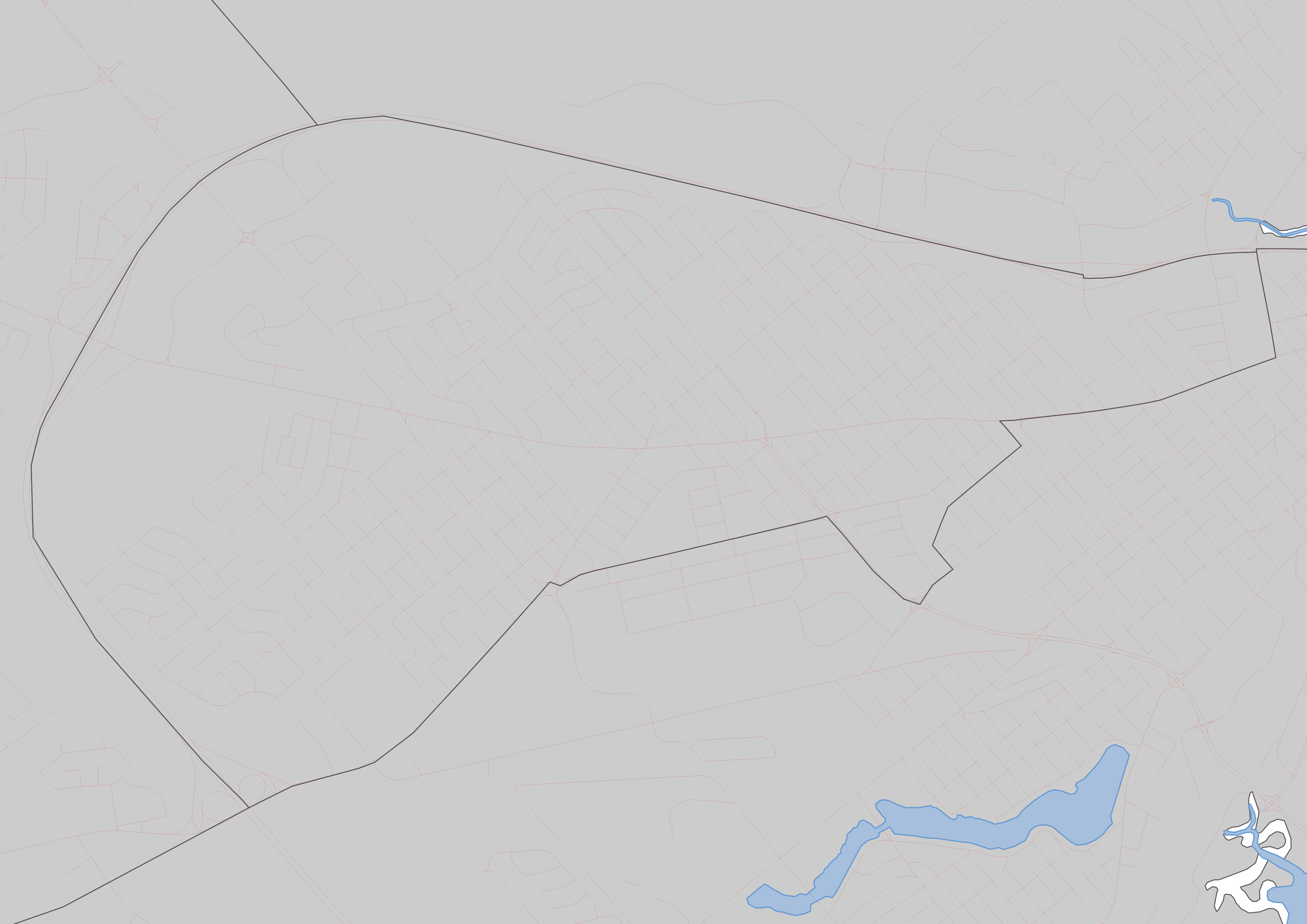
Moncton Centre (as it exists from 2023) and the roads in the riding

== Members of the Legislative Assembly ==
Assembly	Years	Member	Party
Riding created from Moncton East (1974–2014) and Moncton North
58th	2014–2018	Chris Collins	Liberal
58th	2018–2018	Chris Collins	Independent
59th	2018–2020	Rob McKee	Liberal
60th	2020–2024	Rob McKee	Liberal
61st	2024–Present	Rob McKee	Liberal

== Election results ==
2024 New Brunswick general election
Party	Candidate	Votes	%	±%
Liberal	Rob McKee	3,501	56.54	+26.4
Progressive Conservative	Dave Melanson	1,738	28.07	-9.9
Green	Sarah Colwell	711	11.48	-10.5
New Democratic	James Ryan	242	3.91	+0.5
Total valid votes		6,192	99.74	
Total rejected ballots		16	0.26	
Turnout		6,208	56.50	
Eligible voters		10,988		
Liberal notional gain from Progressive Conservative		Swing		+18.2
Source: Elections New Brunswick

2020 provincial election redistributed results
Party	%
Progressive Conservative	38.0
Liberal	30.1
Green	22.0
People's Alliance	6.4
New Democratic	3.4

2020 New Brunswick general election
Party	Candidate	Votes	%	±%
Liberal	Rob McKee	2,448	38.91	-4.68
Green	Carole Chan	1,725	27.42	+14.96
Progressive Conservative	Jean Poirier	1,642	26.10	+10.23
People's Alliance	Aaron Richter	308	4.90	-0.10
New Democratic	James Caldwell	168	2.67	-1.03
Total valid votes		6,291		
Total rejected ballots		15	0.24	-0.00
Turnout		6,306	59.27	+1.08
Eligible voters		10,639		
Liberal hold		Swing		-9.82
Source: Elections New Brunswick

2018 New Brunswick general election
Party	Candidate	Votes	%	±%
Liberal	Rob McKee	2,698	43.59	-9.39
Independent	Chris Collins	1,200	19.39	--
Progressive Conservative	Claudette Boudreau-Turner	982	15.87	-9.35
Green	Jean-Marie Nadeau	771	12.46	+4.40
People's Alliance	Kevin McClure	309	4.99	--
New Democratic	Jessica Caissie	229	3.70	-10.04
Total valid votes		6,189	99.76	
Total rejected ballots		15	0.24	-0.20
Turnout		6,204	59.19	
Eligible voters		10,661		
Liberal hold		Swing		-14.39

2014 New Brunswick general election
Party	Candidate	Votes	%
Liberal	Chris Collins	3,339	52.98
Progressive Conservative	Marie-Claude Blais	1,589	25.21
New Democratic	Luc Leblanc	866	13.74
Green	Jeffrey McCluskey	508	8.06
Total valid votes		6,302	100.0
Total rejected ballots		28	0.44
Turnout		6,330	58.39
Eligible voters		10,841	
This riding was created from parts of the previous riding of Moncton East and Moncton North, which elected a Liberal and a Progressive Conservative, respectively, in the previous election. Chris Collins was the incumbent from Moncton East, and Marie-Claude Blais was the incumbent from Moncton North.
Source: Elections New Brunswick

== See also ==
- List of New Brunswick provincial electoral districts
- Canadian provincial electoral districts
