= Petitcodiac (electoral district) =

Defunct provincial electoral district in New Brunswick, Canada

New Brunswick electoral district
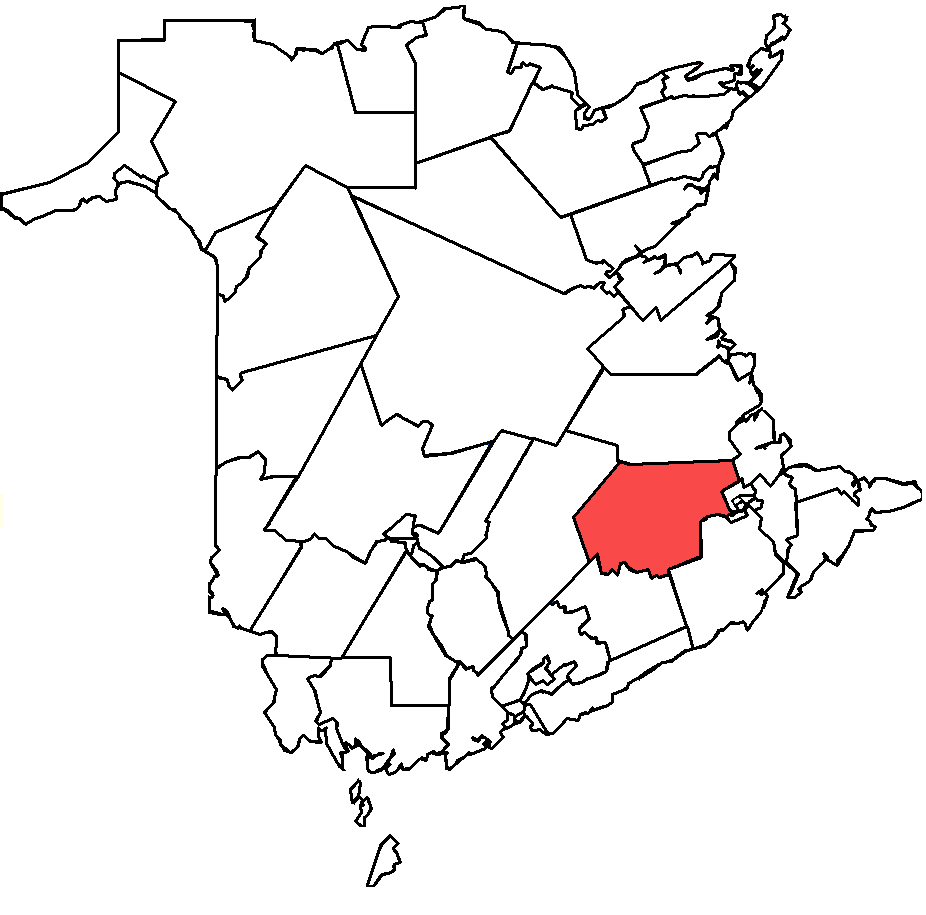
- Petitcodiac in relation to other New Brunswick Provincial electoral districts
- Coordinates: 46.100°N 65.207°W

Defunct provincial electoral district
- Legislature: Legislative Assembly of New Brunswick
- District created: 1973
- District abolished: 2013
- First contested: 1974
- Last contested: 2010

Demographics
- Population (): 14,581

Petitcodiac was a provincial electoral district for the Legislative Assembly of New Brunswick, Canada.

== Members of the Legislative Assembly ==
Assembly	Years	Member	Party
Riding created from Westmorland
48th	1974–1978	Bill Harmer	Progressive Conservative
49th	1978–1982	Bill Harmer	Progressive Conservative
50th	1982–1987	Bill Harmer	Progressive Conservative
51st	1987–1991	Hollis Steeves	Liberal
52nd	1991–1995	Dennis Cochrane	Progressive Conservative
53rd	1995–1999	Hollis Steeves	Liberal
54th	1999–2003	Wally Stiles	Progressive Conservative
55th	2003–2006	Wally Stiles	Progressive Conservative
56th	2006–2007	Wally Stiles	Progressive Conservative
56th	2007–2010	Wally Stiles	Liberal
57th	2010–2014	Sherry Wilson	Progressive Conservative
Riding dissolved into Gagetown-Petitcodiac, Moncton Southwest, Albert, Moncton East and Moncton Northwest

== Election results ==
2010 New Brunswick general election
Party	Candidate	Votes	%	±%
Progressive Conservative	Sherry Wilson	4,133	55.69	-9.22
Liberal	Wally Stiles	1,772	23.87	-5.73
Green	Bethany Thorne-Dykstra	856	11.53	–
New Democratic	Leta Both	661	8.91	+3.43
Total valid votes		7,422	100.0	
Total rejected ballots		44	0.59	
Turnout		7,466	68.40	
Eligible voters		10,915		
Progressive Conservative gain from Liberal		Swing		-1.74
Liberal candidate Wally Stiles lost 41.04 percentage points from his 2006 performance running as a Progressive Conservative.
Source: Elections New Brunswick

2006 New Brunswick general election
Party	Candidate	Votes	%	±%
Progressive Conservative	Wally Stiles	4,640	64.91	+4.35
Liberal	Terry Keating	2,116	29.60	-2.57
New Democratic	Rebecca Lewis-Marshall	392	5.48	+0.30
Total valid votes		7,148	100.0	
Progressive Conservative hold		Swing		+3.46
Source: Elections New Brunswick

2003 New Brunswick general election
Party	Candidate	Votes	%	±%
Progressive Conservative	Wally Stiles	3,481	60.56	-8.76
Liberal	Bethany Dykstra	1,849	32.17	+13.22
New Democratic	Tracy Trott	298	5.18	-2.03
Grey	Dan Leaman	120	2.09	-2.41
Total valid votes		5,748	100.0	
Progressive Conservative hold		Swing		-10.99
Source: Elections New Brunswick

1999 New Brunswick general election
Party	Candidate	Votes	%	±%
Progressive Conservative	Wally Stiles	4,284	69.32	+41.93
Liberal	Gary Armstrong	1,171	18.95	-20.81
New Democratic	Blair McInnis	447	7.23	+2.09
Grey	Donald Alward	278	4.50	–
Total valid votes		6,180	100.0	
Progressive Conservative gain from Liberal		Swing		+31.37
Source: Elections New Brunswick

1995 New Brunswick general election
Party	Candidate	Votes	%	±%
Liberal	Hollis Steeves	2,398	39.76	+9.58
Confederation of Regions	Tom Taylor	1,673	27.74	-3.00
Progressive Conservative	Charles Harmer	1,650	27.36	-3.98
New Democratic	Jennifer Stairs	310	5.14	-2.59
Total valid votes		6,031	100.0	
Liberal gain from Progressive Conservative		Swing		+6.29
Source: Elections New Brunswick

1991 New Brunswick general election
Party	Candidate	Votes	%	±%
Progressive Conservative	Dennis Cochrane	4,879	31.34	+2.48
Confederation of Regions	Leona May Geldart	4,786	30.74	–
Liberal	Hollis S. Steeves	4,698	30.18	-23.13
New Democratic	Richard Hay	1,204	7.73	-10.00
Total valid votes		15,567	100.0	
Progressive Conservative gain from Liberal		Swing		-14.13
Source: Elections New Brunswick

1987 New Brunswick general election
Party	Candidate	Votes	%	±%
Liberal	Hollis S. Steeves	7,081	53.31	+20.65
Progressive Conservative	C.W. "Bill" Harmer	3,833	28.86	-25.86
New Democratic	Richard James Hay	2,368	17.83	+5.20
Total valid votes		13,282	100.0	
Liberal gain from Progressive Conservative		Swing		+23.26
Source: Elections New Brunswick

1982 New Brunswick general election
Party	Candidate	Votes	%	±%
Progressive Conservative	C.W. "Bill" Harmer	6,388	54.72	+3.70
Liberal	Hollis Stanley Steeves	3,813	32.66	-2.87
New Democratic	Charles B. Sullivan	1,474	12.63	+6.18
Total valid votes		11,675	100.0	
Progressive Conservative hold		Swing		+3.28
Source: Elections New Brunswick

1978 New Brunswick general election
Party	Candidate	Votes	%	±%
Progressive Conservative	C. W. "Bill" Harmer	4,911	51.02	+2.97
Liberal	Harold Alward	3,420	35.53	-1.42
New Democratic	Ronald McGrath	621	6.45	+3.30
Independent	Rev. C. Edward Pickett	556	5.78	–
Parti acadien	Patrick D. Clarke	117	1.22	–
Total valid votes		9,625	100.0	
Progressive Conservative hold		Swing		+2.20
Source: Elections New Brunswick

1974 New Brunswick general election
Party	Candidate	Votes	%
Progressive Conservative	C.W. "Bill" Harmer	3,914	48.05
Liberal	Wendell J. Maxwell	3,010	36.95
Independent	Ronald T. Sabine	965	11.85
New Democratic	Joyce Marie Sullivan	257	3.15
Total valid votes		8,146	100.0
The previous multi-member riding of Westmorland went totally Liberal in the previous election. Neither of the four incumbents ran in this election.
Source: Elections New Brunswick

== See also ==
- List of New Brunswick provincial electoral districts
- Canadian provincial electoral districts
