= Memramcook-Lakeville-Dieppe =

Defunct provincial electoral district in New Brunswick, Canada

New Brunswick electoral district
- Memramcook-Lakeville-Dieppe in relation to other New Brunswick Provincial electoral districts

Defunct provincial electoral district
- Legislature: Legislative Assembly of New Brunswick
- District created: 2006
- District abolished: 2013
- First contested: 2006
- Last contested: 2010

Memramcook-Lakeville-Dieppe was a provincial electoral district for the Legislative Assembly of New Brunswick, Canada.

== History ==
It was created in 2006 as a result the large population increase in the city of Dieppe. The district was carved largely out of the old riding of Dieppe-Memramcook taking about 1/5 of Dieppe, the village of Memramcook and surrounding areas. The community of Lakeville was also a part of this riding, having come from the neighbouring district of Moncton Crescent.

== Members of the Legislative Assembly ==
Assembly	Years	Member	Party
Riding created from Dieppe-Memramcook, Shediac-Cap-Pelé and Moncton Crescent
56th	2006–2010	Bernard LeBlanc	Liberal
57th	2010–2014	Bernard LeBlanc	Liberal
Riding dissolved into Memramcook-Tantramar, Dieppe, Moncton East and Shediac Bay-Dieppe

== Election results ==
2010 New Brunswick general election
Party	Candidate	Votes	%	±%
Liberal	Bernard LeBlanc	3,423	50.82	-5.62
Progressive Conservative	Fortunat Duguay	2,171	32.23	-7.11
New Democratic	Denis Brun	708	10.51	+6.28
Green	Fanny Leblanc	433	6.43	–
Total valid votes		6,735	100.0	
Total rejected ballots		80	1.17	
Turnout		6,815	69.63	
Eligible voters		9,787		
Liberal hold		Swing		+0.74
Source: Elections New Brunswick

2006 New Brunswick general election
Party	Candidate	Votes	%	±%
Liberal	Bernard LeBlanc	3,845	56.44	
Progressive Conservative	Fortunat Duguay	2,680	39.34	
New Democratic	Carl Bainbridge	288	4.23	
Total valid votes		6,813	100.0	
Liberal notional gain		Swing		

== See also ==
- List of New Brunswick provincial electoral districts
- Canadian provincial electoral districts
