= Robert Hall (New Brunswick politician) =

Canadian politician

Member of the Legislative Assembly for Tantramar
- In office October 12, 1982 – October 13, 1987
- Preceded by: Lloyd Folkins
- Succeeded by: Marilyn Trenholme

Personal details
- Born: November 30, 1930 Cape Spear, New Brunswick
- Died: June 7, 2016 (aged 85) Moncton, New Brunswick
- Party: New Democratic
- Profession: Teacher

Robert Arthur Hall (November 30, 1930 – June 7, 2016) was a Canadian politician. He served in the Legislative Assembly of New Brunswick from 1982 to 1987, as a NDP member for the constituency of Tantramar. He was the first New Democrat to be elected to the legislature.

He had also served several terms on the village council of Port Elgin, New Brunswick, at one point having served as mayor of that community. Hall died in 2016 at the age of 85.
