= Department of Justice and Consumer Affairs =

Canadian government department

The Department of Justice is a part of the Government of New Brunswick. It is charged with the protection of the public interest and, as such, oversees the insurance industry, financial institutions, pensions and rental housing.

The department was established on February 14, 2006 when Premier Bernard Lord restructured government under the name Department of Justice and Consumer Affairs. It was created out of necessity as Lord wanted to appoint Brad Green, the only lawyer in his caucus, as Minister of Health. In order to facilitate this the Office of the Attorney General, which Green continued to occupy as Health Minister, was severed from the Department of Justice which was in turn renamed the Department of Justice and Consumer Affairs.

On October 3, 2006, new Premier Shawn Graham named T. J. Burke as both Attorney General and Minister of Justice and Consumer Affairs, however in legislation to realign government departments passed on March 2, 2007 the Office of the Attorney General and the Department of Justice and Consumer Affairs remained separate entities.

On March 15, 2012 it was merged back together with the Office of Attorney General to form the Department of Justice and Attorney General. However, it was again created in September 2013 when non-lawyer Troy Lifford was appointed minister of justice. In 2016, its separation from the functions of the Office of the Attorney General were further confirmed when it was merged into a new Department of Justice and Public Safety.

== Ministers ==
#	Minister	Term	Administration
1.	Bruce Fitch	February 14, 2006 – October 3, 2006	under Bernard Lord
2.	T. J. Burke*	October 3, 2006 – June 22, 2009	under Shawn Graham
3.	Mike Murphy*	June 22, 2009 – January 4, 2010	under Shawn Graham
4.	Bernard LeBlanc	January 4, 2010 – February 11, 2010	under Shawn Graham
	Kelly Lamrock (acting)	February 11, 2010 – May 10, 2010	under Shawn Graham
	Bernard LeBlanc (second time)	May 10, 2010 – October 12, 2010	under Shawn Graham
5.	Marie-Claude Blais*†	October 12, 2010 – March 15, 2012	under David Alward
6.	Troy Lifford	September 23, 2013 – October 7, 2014	under David Alward
7.	Stephen Horsman	October 7, 2014 - June 6, 2016	

* Burke, Murphy and Blais each served jointly as Minister of Justice and Consumer Affairs and Attorney General of New Brunswick, while Lamrock served as Attorney General when serving as acting Minister of Justice and Consumer Affairs.
† Blais continued as Minister of Justice and Attorney General.
