= Moncton East (electoral district, 1974–2014) =

Defunct provincial electoral district in New Brunswick, Canada

Moncton East (1974–2014)
New Brunswick electoral district
- Coordinates: 46.110°N 64.782°W

Defunct provincial electoral district
- Legislature: Legislative Assembly of New Brunswick
- District created: 1973
- District abolished: 2013
- First contested: 1974
- Last contested: 2010

Demographics
- Census division: Westmorland
- Census subdivision: Moncton

Moncton East (French: Moncton-Est) was a provincial electoral district for the Legislative Assembly of New Brunswick, Canada. Prior to 2007, it has been held by only two individuals both of whom served as Premier of New Brunswick. Ray Frenette, a Liberal who served as premier from 1997 to 1998, represented the district from its creation for the 1974 election until he resigned in 1998. Bernard Lord, a Progressive Conservative who served as premier from 1999 to 2006, won the seat in a by-election after Frenette's resignation until his own resignation on January 31, 2007. Its last MLA, Liberal Chris Collins, was elected in a by-election to replace Lord.

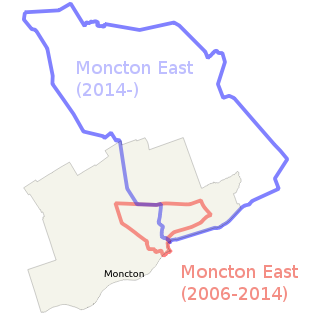
The electoral districts of Moncton East (2006–2014) and Moncton East (2014–) as they relate to the city of Moncton.

The district was abolished at the 2013 redistribution, however a new district by the same name was created out of a minority of its territory and population.

== Members of the Legislative Assembly ==
Assembly	Years	Member	Party
Riding created from Moncton
48th	1974–1978	Ray Frenette	Liberal
49th	1978–1982	Ray Frenette	Liberal
50th	1982–1987	Ray Frenette	Liberal
51st	1987–1991	Ray Frenette	Liberal
52nd	1991–1995	Ray Frenette	Liberal
53rd	1995–1998	Ray Frenette	Liberal
53rd	1998–1999	Bernard Lord	Progressive Conservative
54th	1999–2003	Bernard Lord	Progressive Conservative
55th	2003–2006	Bernard Lord	Progressive Conservative
56th	2006–2007	Bernard Lord	Progressive Conservative
56th	2007–2010	Chris Collins	Liberal
57th	2010–2014	Chris Collins	Liberal
Riding dissolved into Moncton Centre, Moncton East (2014–present) and Moncton South

== Election results ==
2010 New Brunswick general election
Party	Candidate	Votes	%	±%
Liberal	Chris Collins	2,641	41.58	-16.70
Progressive Conservative	Karen Nelson	2,462	38.76	+5.32
New Democratic	Teresa Sullivan	626	9.86	+1.59
Green	Roy MacMullin	599	9.43	–
Total valid votes		6,352	100.0	
Total rejected ballots		76	1.18	
Turnout		6,428	59.80	
Eligible voters		10,749		
Liberal hold		Swing		-11.01
Source: Elections New Brunswick

New Brunswick provincial by-election, March 5, 2007
Party	Candidate	Votes	%	±%
Liberal	Chris Collins	2,628	58.28	+17.67
Progressive Conservative	Chad Peters	1,508	33.44	-21.37
New Democratic	Hélène Lapointe	373	8.27	+3.69
Total valid votes		4,509	100.0	
Liberal gain from Progressive Conservative		Swing		+19.52

2006 New Brunswick general election
Party	Candidate	Votes	%	±%
Progressive Conservative	Bernard Lord	3,816	54.81	+2.69
Liberal	Brian Gallant	2,827	40.61	+1.77
New Democratic	Mark Robar	319	4.58	-4.45
Total valid votes		6,962	100.0	
Progressive Conservative hold		Swing		+0.46

2003 New Brunswick general election
Party	Candidate	Votes	%	±%
Progressive Conservative	Bernard Lord	4,177	52.12	-14.35
Liberal	Chris Collins	3,113	38.84	+12.92
New Democratic	Jean-Marie Nadeau	724	9.03	+2.16
Total valid votes		8,014	100.0	
Progressive Conservative hold		Swing		-13.64

1999 New Brunswick general election
Party	Candidate	Votes	%	±%
Progressive Conservative	Bernard Lord	5,248	66.47	+15.54
Liberal	Kevin John Fram	2,046	25.92	-13.81
New Democratic	Mark Robar	542	6.87	-2.47
Natural Law	Laurent Maltais	59	0.75	–
Total valid votes		7,895	100.0	
Progressive Conservative hold		Swing		+14.68

New Brunswick provincial by-election, 1998
Party	Candidate	Votes	%	±%
Progressive Conservative	Bernard Lord	3,266	50.93	+32.91
Liberal	Charlie Bourgeois	2,548	39.73	-22.07
New Democratic	Beth McLaughlin	599	9.34	-2.48
Total valid votes		6,413	100.0	
Progressive Conservative gain from Liberal		Swing		+27.49

1995 New Brunswick general election
Party	Candidate	Votes	%	±%
Liberal	Ray Frenette	4,466	61.80	+8.65
Progressive Conservative	Brian Frederick Donaghy	1,302	18.02	+4.53
New Democratic	Gérard Snow	854	11.82	-6.80
Confederation of Regions	Gerry Fullerton	604	8.36	-6.37
Total valid votes		7,226	100.0	
Liberal hold		Swing		+2.06

1991 New Brunswick general election
Party	Candidate	Votes	%	±%
Liberal	Ray Frenette	4,041	53.15	-17.22
New Democratic	Mary Elizabeth McLaughlin	1,416	18.62	+4.27
Confederation of Regions	William André Joseph LeSage	1,120	14.73	–
Progressive Conservative	John Hansen	1,026	13.49	-1.79
Total valid votes		7,603	100.0	
Liberal hold		Swing		-10.74

1987 New Brunswick general election
Party	Candidate	Votes	%	±%
Liberal	Ray Frenette	5,131	70.37	+19.01
Progressive Conservative	David Cutler	1,114	15.28	-20.89
New Democratic	Raymond Boucher	1,046	14.35	+5.11
Total valid votes		7,291	100.0	
Liberal hold		Swing		+19.95

1982 New Brunswick general election
Party	Candidate	Votes	%	±%
Liberal	Ray Frenette	3,817	51.36	-4.75
Progressive Conservative	Norman H. Crossman	2,688	36.17	+7.46
New Democratic	Raymond Boucher	687	9.24	+0.77
Parti acadien	Gilles Frenette	165	2.22	-4.49
Independent	Raymond Leger	75	1.01	
Total valid votes		7,432	100.0	
Liberal hold		Swing		-6.10

1978 New Brunswick general election
Party	Candidate	Votes	%	±%
Liberal	Ray Frenette	3,921	56.11	+7.94
Progressive Conservative	Raymond J. Thibodeau	2,006	28.71	-14.95
New Democratic	John William Kingston	592	8.47	+4.26
Parti acadien	Simone LeBlanc-Rainsville	469	6.71	–
Total valid votes		6,988	100.0	
Liberal hold		Swing		

1974 New Brunswick general election
Party	Candidate	Votes	%
Liberal	Ray Frenette	4,210	48.17
Progressive Conservative	Jean-Paul LeBlanc	3,816	43.66
New Democratic	Gregory Murphy	368	4.21
Independent	Sanford Phillips	346	3.96
Total valid votes		8,740	100.0
The previous multi-member riding of Moncton went totally Progressive Conservative in the last election, with Jean-Paul LeBlanc being one of three incumbents.

== See also ==
- List of New Brunswick provincial electoral districts
- Canadian provincial electoral districts
