= Natacha Vautour =

Canadian politician from New Brunswick

Member of the New Brunswick Legislative Assembly for Dieppe-Memramcook
- Incumbent
- Assumed office October 21, 2024
- Preceded by: new district

Personal details
- Party: Liberal

Natacha Vautour is a Canadian politician, who was elected to the Legislative Assembly of New Brunswick in the 2024 election. She was elected in the riding of Dieppe-Memramcook.

Vautour is an educator by profession.

== Electoral record ==
2024 New Brunswick general election: Dieppe-Memramcook
| Party | Candidate | Votes | % | ±% |
|---|---|---|---|---|
| Liberal | Natacha Vautour | 5,600 | 66.3% | +4.9 |
| Green | Jacques Giguère | 1,531 | 18.1% | +1.0 |
| Progressive Conservative | Dean Léonard | 1,311 | 15.5% | -3.9 |
| Total valid votes | | | | |
| Total rejected ballots | | | | |
| Turnout | | | | |
| Eligible voters | | | | |
Source: Elections New Brunswick
