= Greg O'Donnell =

Canadian politician

Gregory Hugh O'Donnell (April 8, 1952 — May 26, 2016) was a businessman and former political figure in New Brunswick, Canada. He represented Memramcook and then Dieppe-Memramcook in the Legislative Assembly of New Brunswick from 1987 to 1999 as a Liberal member.

He was born in Memramcook, New Brunswick, the son of William O'Donnell and Julia Leblanc. He was educated at the Université de Moncton. O'Donnell served as Minister of Supply and Services from 1998 to 1999. In 1995, he defeated Lord Bernard to win his seat in the provincial assembly. O'Donnell was defeated when he ran for reelection in 1999.
