= T. J. Burke =

Canadian politician

Thomas Jack Burke

Member of the New Brunswick Legislative Assembly for Fredericton-Nashwaaksis Fredericton North (2003-2006)
- In office June 9, 2003 – September 27, 2010
- Preceded by: D. Peter Forbes
- Succeeded by: Troy Lifford

Personal details
- Born: February 23, 1972 (age 54) Los Angeles, California
- Party: Liberal
- Occupation: Lawyer

Thomas Jack "T.J." Burke KC (born 1972) is a New Brunswick lawyer

As a Wolastoqiyik member of Tobique First Nation, Burke made history when he was elected becoming the first Indigenous person elected to a legislature anywhere in the Maritimes. He served in the Legislative Assembly of New Brunswick from 2003-2010 and was a member of the executive council from 2006 to 2009 by serving as Minister of Justice and Attorney General.

Burke was born in Los Angeles, California. His family returned to Canada in 1978, and he was raised in Fredericton, New Brunswick. He graduated from Fredericton High School in 1990. After high school, Burke enlisted in the United States Military where he served from 1991 to 1995 as a paratrooper with the 82nd Airborne Division, one of America's elite military units. Following his service in the U.S. military, Burke again returned to Canada and completed a Bachelor of Arts at the University of New Brunswick (New Brunswick) and a law degree at Dalhousie University. He practiced law in Fredericton until he was named to the Provincial cabinet.

Burke received national attention on December 15, 2005, when the legislature unanimously passed his tireless work and dedication on creating a motion declaring 2006 the "Year of the War Bride".

On September 28, 2010, Burke was defeated by Progressive Conservative candidate Troy Lifford and lost his seat in the Legislature.

Since his departure from politics, Burke has become one of New Brunswick's prominent criminal law defence lawyers and out of court room negotiators. He is regarded by many of his peers as a tireless advocate for the wrongfully accused and relentless defence lawyer in the court room. Burke was appointed and served a term as Canada's Chief Federal Negotiator on an important legal file.

Burke has argued successful cases before all level of court including the Supreme Court of Canada. He has received various academic and public awards through law and politics, such as the Queen's Diamond Jubilee Awards. He has taught courses at both St. Thomas University and the University of New Brunswick's law school and is a recipient of the Queen's Counsel designation, a special recognition reserved for senior members of the legal community, who have distinguished themselves in their areas of legal practise.

New Brunswick provincial government of Shawn Graham
Cabinet posts (3)
Predecessor	Office	Successor
Roland Haché	Minister of Environment; 2009	Rick Miles
Brad Green	Attorney General of New Brunswick; 2006–2009	Mike Murphy
Bruce Fitch	Minister of Justice and Consumer Affairs; 2006–2009	Mike Murphy
