= Gene Devereux =

Canadian politician

Gene Devereux is a former politician in the province of New Brunswick, Canada. He was elected to the Legislative Assembly of New Brunswick in 1995 and defeated in a bid for re-election in 1999.

He represented the electoral district of Moncton North and served as minister of the environment. He was the Liberal candidate for Moncton West in the 2006 election, but was defeated by 304 votes.
