= Michael McKee (politician) =

Canadian politician

Michael George McKee (born March 22, 1940) is a lawyer, judge, former Catholic priest, and former political figure in New Brunswick, Canada. He represented Moncton North in the Legislative Assembly of New Brunswick from 1974 to 1993 as a Liberal member.

== Early years and priesthood ==
He was born in Bouctouche, New Brunswick, the son of Killeen McKee and Juliette Michaud, and was educated at St. Thomas University, Holy Heart Seminary and the University of New Brunswick. McKee was a parish priest for five years in Moncton and was chaplain for the Dorchester Penitentiary for four years. He left the priesthood and married Winnifred Anne Shaw in 1982.

== Politics ==
Michael McKee (often known as "Mike") was elected as a Liberal MLA for Moncton North in 1974 served in opposition until 1987. He became a member of the province's Executive Council as Minister of Labour and Minister for Multiculturalism from 1987 to 1991 under Premier Frank McKenna. He was out of cabinet from 1991 onwards to 1993.

He is one of three generations of Liberal members of the Legislative Assembly. His father Killeen McKee was a member from 1940 to 1952, and his son Rob McKee has been a member since 2018.

== Judiciary ==
McKee resigned his seat in 1993 after being named a judge in the provincial court and retired as provincial court justice in March 2015.
