= Department of Justice and Attorney General (New Brunswick) =

Agency overview
- Jurisdiction: New Brunswick
- Parent department: Government of New Brunswick

The Department of Justice and Attorney General in New Brunswick, a Canadian province, a department in the New Brunswick government. Traditionally headed by the Attorney General, the functions of the attorney general were split from it from February 14, 2006, to March 15, 2012, and then again in 2013. Prior to 2006, it was known simply as the Department of Justice.

It is charged with the protection of the public interest and, as such, oversees the insurance industry, financial institutions, pensions and rental housing, and with providing legal services to all departments and agencies of the government.

The following two departments were created when this department was split up in 2006, and were brought back together in 2012:

- The Office of the Attorney General, which oversaw many of the functions traditionally associated with the department; and
- The Department of Justice and Consumer Affairs which oversaw many of the regulatory functions of the department which had been in place for the "protection of the public interest".

== See also ==
- Justice ministry
- Politics of New Brunswick
