= Mike Murphy (New Brunswick politician) =

Canadian lawyer and politician

Michael Murphy

Member of the New Brunswick Legislative Assembly for Moncton North
- In office June 9, 2003 – September 27, 2010
- Preceded by: René Landry
- Succeeded by: Marie-Claude Blais

Personal details
- Born: January 25, 1958 (age 68) Moncton, New Brunswick
- Party: Liberal
- Occupation: lawyer

Michael Barry Murphy KC (born January 25, 1958) is a New Brunswick lawyer and politician.

== Biography ==
Murphy graduated from Moncton High School in 1976, from the University of New Brunswick with a Bachelor of Business Administration in 1980 and a Bachelor of Laws in 1983. He received his Master of Laws from Osgoode Hall Law School in 2002.

A personal injury lawyer, Murphy was president of the New Brunswick Liberal Association from 1988 to 1993.

In 2001, Murphy considered running for the leadership of the New Brunswick Liberal Party, but dropped out after forming an early campaign team. He supported Shawn Graham, the eventual winner.

He was first elected to the Legislative Assembly of New Brunswick in the 2003 election, the only Liberal to win a seat in Moncton. Following the election, he was named as opposition critic for the Department of Family and Community Services, a post he held until being elevated to finance critic in early 2005.

He was re-elected in the 2006 election and joined the cabinet as Minister of Health.

In June 2009, Murphy became the Attorney General and Justice Minister. He resigned from cabinet in January 2010 to spend more time with his family and return to practising law. At the time, Murphy said the decision had nothing to do with the government, but later admitted that he did quit over NB Power, but said he felt it was more honourable to not say so at the time. In early 2010, Murphy took a partner position at the law firm of Cox and Palmer in Moncton. In 2011 he formed his own firm which has expanded to over 30 employees. In 2022, it was re-branded as the Mike Murphy Law Group, and expanded into Halifax, Nova Scotia, where his son, Aodhan Murphy, resides

=== New Brunswick Liberal Association leadership election, 2012 ===
On January 5, 2012, Murphy announced he was entering the race for the leadership of the New Brunswick Liberal Party. In October 2012, at the leadership convention, Murphy was defeated on the first ballot by Brian Gallant.

2012 Liberal leadership election results
Candidate	Points	%
Brian Gallant	3,259.44	59.26
Michael Murphy	2,089.39	37.99
Nick Duivenvoorden	151.17	2.75

New Brunswick provincial government of Shawn Graham
Cabinet posts (3)
Predecessor	Office	Successor
T. J. Burke	Attorney General of New Brunswick; 2009–2010	Kelly Lamrock
T. J. Burke	Minister of Justice and Consumer Affairs; 2009–2010	Bernard LeBlanc
Brad Green	Minister of Health; 2006–2009	Mary Schryer
Special Cabinet Responsibilities
Predecessor	Title	Successor
Stuart Jamieson	Government House Leader; 2007–2010	Greg Byrne
