= Moncton North (electoral district) =

Defunct provincial electoral district in New Brunswick, Canada

New Brunswick electoral district
- Coordinates: 46.139°N 64.785°W

Defunct provincial electoral district
- Legislature: Legislative Assembly of New Brunswick
- District created: 1973
- District abolished: 2013
- First contested: 1974
- Last contested: 2010

Demographics
- Census division: Westmorland
- Census subdivision: Moncton

Moncton North (French: Moncton-Nord) was a provincial electoral district for the Legislative Assembly of New Brunswick, Canada.

== Members of the Legislative Assembly ==
Assembly	Years	Member	Party
Riding created from Moncton
48th	1974–1978	Michael McKee	Liberal
49th	1978–1982	Michael McKee	Liberal
50th	1982–1987	Michael McKee	Liberal
51st	1987–1991	Michael McKee	Liberal
52nd	1991–1993	Michael McKee	Liberal
52nd	1993–1995	John Lebans	Liberal
53rd	1995–1999	Gene Devereux	Liberal
54th	1999–2003	René Landry	Progressive Conservative
55th	2003–2006	Mike Murphy	Liberal
56th	2006–2010	Mike Murphy	Liberal
57th	2010–2014	Marie-Claude Blais	Progressive Conservative
Riding dissolved into Moncton Southwest and Moncton Centre

== Election results ==
2010 New Brunswick general election
Party	Candidate	Votes	%	±%
Progressive Conservative	Marie-Claude Blais	2,349	44.95	+0.06
Liberal	Kevin Robart	1,910	36.55	-12.63
New Democratic	Jean Guimond	511	9.78	+3.85
Green	Greta Doucet	365	6.98	–
People's Alliance	Carl Bainbridge	91	1.74	–
Total valid votes		5,226	100.0	
Total rejected ballots		44	0.83	
Turnout		5,270	55.47	
Eligible voters		9,501		
Progressive Conservative gain from Liberal		Swing		+6.34
Source: Elections New Brunswick

2006 New Brunswick general election
Party	Candidate	Votes	%	±%
Liberal	Mike Murphy	2,705	49.18	-0.53
Progressive Conservative	Marie-Claude Blais	2,469	44.89	+2.19
New Democratic	Cindy Rix	326	5.93	-1.66
Total valid votes		5,500	100.0	
Liberal hold		Swing		-1.36

2003 New Brunswick general election
Party	Candidate	Votes	%	±%
Liberal	Mike Murphy	3,555	49.71	+17.85
Progressive Conservative	René Landry	3,054	42.70	-9.51
New Democratic	Nancy McBain	543	7.59	-6.91
Total valid votes		7,152	100.0	
Liberal gain from Progressive Conservative		Swing		+13.68

1999 New Brunswick general election
Party	Candidate	Votes	%	±%
Progressive Conservative	René Landry	3,776	52.21	+36.09
Liberal	Gene Devereux	2,304	31.86	-29.47
New Democratic	Nancy Hartling	1,049	14.50	+5.89
Confederation of Regions	John Gallant	103	1.42	-11.96
Total valid votes		7,232	100.0	
Progressive Conservative gain from Liberal		Swing		+32.78

1995 New Brunswick general election
Party	Candidate	Votes	%	±%
Liberal	Gene Devereux	4,333	61.33	+0.56
Progressive Conservative	Marc LeBlanc	1,139	16.12	+4.81
Confederation of Regions	Cyril Flanagan	945	13.38	-8.34
New Democratic	Mark Robar	608	8.61	+2.40
Natural Law	Michael Boucher	40	0.57	–
Total valid votes		7,065	100.0	
Liberal hold		Swing		-2.12

New Brunswick provincial by-election, 1993
Party	Candidate	Votes	%	±%
Liberal	John M. Lebans	3,601	60.77	+6.33
Confederation of Regions	Richard H. Mullins	1,287	21.72	+1.52
Progressive Conservative	Don Canning	670	11.31	-3.01
New Democratic	Jean-Claude Bourque	368	6.21	-4.83
Total valid votes		5,926	100.0	
Liberal hold		Swing		+2.40

1991 New Brunswick general election
Party	Candidate	Votes	%	±%
Liberal	Mike McKee	4,797	54.44	-20.63
Confederation of Regions	Tom Taylor	1,780	20.20	–
Progressive Conservative	John MacFarlane	1,262	14.32	+1.95
New Democratic	J.C. Bourque	973	11.04	-1.52
Total valid votes		8,812	100.0	
Liberal hold		Swing		-20.42

1987 New Brunswick general election
Party	Candidate	Votes	%	±%
Liberal	Mike McKee	6,570	75.07	+19.64
New Democratic	Chris Collins	1,099	12.56	+3.24
Progressive Conservative	Stephen M. Trueman	1,083	12.37	-22.88
Total valid votes		8,752	100.0	
Liberal hold		Swing		+8.20

1982 New Brunswick general election
Party	Candidate	Votes	%	±%
Liberal	Mike McKee	4,768	55.43	+1.49
Progressive Conservative	Kathryn Barnes	3,032	35.25	-2.13
New Democratic	Thomas F. Wilson	802	9.32	+3.42
Total valid votes		8,602	100.0	
Liberal hold		Swing		+1.81

1978 New Brunswick general election
Party	Candidate	Votes	%	±%
Liberal	Father Mike McKee	4,362	53.94	-4.90
Progressive Conservative	Albert L. Galbraith	3,023	37.38	-1.39
New Democratic	Guy J. Richard	477	5.90	+3.51
Parti acadien	David Britton	225	2.78	–
Total valid votes		8,087	100.0	
Liberal hold		Swing		-1.76

1974 New Brunswick general election
Party	Candidate	Votes	%
Liberal	Father Mike McKee	5,040	58.84
Progressive Conservative	Arthur H. Buck	3,321	38.77
New Democratic	Phyllis Torrance	205	2.39
Total valid votes		8,566	100.0
The previous multi-member riding of Moncton went totally Progressive Conservative in the last election, with Arthur Buck being one of three incumbents.

== See also ==
- List of New Brunswick provincial electoral districts
- Canadian provincial electoral districts
