= Hollis Steeves =

Canadian politician

- Born: 5 March 1935; Moncton, New Brunswick
- Occupations: Farmer and former political figure in New Brunswick, Canada

Hollis Steeves (March 5, 1935 – January 19, 2019) is a farmer and former political figure in New Brunswick, Canada. He represented Petitcodiac in the Legislative Assembly of New Brunswick from 1987 to 1991 and from 1995 to 1999 as a Liberal member.

== Early life ==
He was born in Moncton, New Brunswick, the son of Stanley and Thelma Steeves, and educated at the Ontario Police College.

== Career ==
Steeves was a police officer in Ontario for several years. He returned to New Brunswick, where he became a cattle farmer, also raising horses. Steeves ran unsuccessfully for a seat in the provincial assembly in 1982. He retired from politics in 1999.

== Family life ==
He was married to Ilse Klingenhoff.
