= Chris Collins (Canadian politician) =

Canadian politician (born 1962)

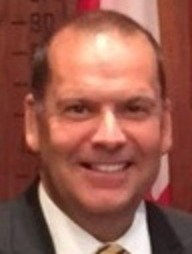

Speaker of the Legislative Assembly of New Brunswick
- In office October 25, 2014 – October 23, 2018
- Preceded by: Dale Graham
- Succeeded by: Daniel Guitard

Member of the New Brunswick Legislative Assembly for Moncton East
- In office March 5, 2007 – 2014
- Preceded by: Bernard Lord
- Succeeded by: riding dissolved

Member of the New Brunswick Legislative Assembly for Moncton Centre
- In office 2014–2018
- Preceded by: first member
- Succeeded by: Rob McKee

Personal details
- Born: June 23, 1962 (age 63) Saint John, New Brunswick
- Party: Independent
- Other political affiliations: Liberal (before 2018)

Chris Collins (born June 23, 1962) is a former Canadian politician from Moncton, New Brunswick. He served as MLA for the riding of Moncton Centre from 2014 until 2018, having previously served part of one term as a city councillor for Moncton City Council. On October 24, 2014, Collins was elected Speaker of the Legislative Assembly of New Brunswick succeeding Dale Graham. Collins was defeated in the 2018 provincial election.

== Politics ==
Collins first entered politics as a New Brunswick New Democratic Party candidate in the 1987 election. He was not active in politics thereafter until his son, Sean, became ill with cancer in 2002. Frustrated by the lack of support and the lack of assistance in travel costs for he and his family to go see his son who was being treated at the IWK Health Centre in Halifax, Nova Scotia, he tried to meet his local Member of Legislative Assembly. That MLA was Bernard Lord, who was concurrently serving as Premier of New Brunswick and would not take his meetings.

Frustrated, Collins ran under the Liberal banner in the 2003 election against Lord, a Progressive Conservative, in the district of Moncton East. Collins made it a close race and for parts of election night, Collins led Lord, though Lord was eventually victorious by a margin of 10%. Collins sought election to Moncton City Council in the 2004 municipal elections and won. He was widely expected to face Lord in a rematch in what would have been the 2006 election but was travelling to Australia with his son when the election was called a year earlier than expected. Collins was elected however to replace Lord in a by-election on March 5, 2007, after Lord resigned the leadership of his party and his seat in the legislature following his government's defeat in the 2006 election.

Under Premier Shawn Graham, Collins served as Minister for Local Government.

On October 24, 2014, Collins was elected Speaker of the Legislative Assembly of New Brunswick succeeding Dale Graham.

On April 5, 2018, Premier Brian Gallant suspended Collins from the Liberal caucus pending an investigation into allegations of harassment made against Collins by a former employee of the Legislative Assembly. Gallant also said that his government would request the legislative administration committee suspend Collins as speaker until the third-party investigation is complete.

On April 9, 2018, Speaker Collins announced he would step aside from his Administrative responsibilities as Speaker until an investigation could be completed. On July 27, 2018, Speaker Collins resumed full Speaker responsibilities and served as Speaker until the election of a new Speaker following the Gallant Government's defeat.

On May 19, 2018, Collins announced he was launching a lawsuit for libel and slander against Premier Brian Gallant. Collins also asked the Clerk of The Legislative Assembly of New Brunswick to move his seat to the opposite side of the house and he completed his term as an Independent MLA making the Gallant government a de facto minority government.

Collins ran for re-election in 2018 as an Independent and was defeated.

Collins' son Sean died on July 9, 2007, at the age of 13. Collins is a board member of Advocacy for Canadian Childhood Oncology Research Network.

On October 3, 2022, Collins became the executive director of Canadian Parents for French New Brunswick, an advocacy group that promotes French as a second language.
