= Troy Lifford =

Canadian politician

Member of the New Brunswick Legislative Assembly for Fredericton-Nashwaaksis
- In office September 27, 2010 – September 22, 2014
- Preceded by: T.J. Burke
- Succeeded by: Stephen Horsman

Personal details
- Born: 1975 (age 50–51)
- Party: Progressive Conservative

Troy Lifford is a Canadian politician, who was elected to the Legislative Assembly of New Brunswick in the 2010 provincial election. He represented the electoral district of Fredericton-Nashwaaksis as a member of the Progressive Conservatives until the 2014 provincial election, when he was defeated by Stephen Horsman in the redistributed seat of Fredericton North.

== Cabinet positions ==
New Brunswick provincial government of David Alward
Cabinet posts (2)
Predecessor	Office	Successor
Marie-Claude Blais	Minister of Justice; September 19, 2013–October 7, 2014	Stephen Horsman
Blaine Higgs	Minister of Human Resources; October 9, 2012–September 19, 2013	Robert Trevors
