= Tantramar (electoral district) =

Provincial electoral district in New Brunswick, Canada

New Brunswick electoral district
- The riding of Tantramar (as it exists from 2023) in relation to other New Brunswick electoral districts

Provincial electoral district
- Legislature: Legislative Assembly of New Brunswick
MLA
Megan Mitton
Green
- District created: 1973
- First contested: 1974
- Last contested: 2024

Demographics
- Population (2011): 15,884
- Electors (2013): 11,368

Tantramar is a provincial electoral district for the Legislative Assembly of New Brunswick, Canada.

It was created in the 1973 electoral redistribution and first used in the 1974 election as Tantramar. It went largely unchanged in both the 1994 redistribution and 2006 redistribution, even though it was well below the allowable population variance in the latter. In 2006, the electoral boundaries commission ruled that the district was an exceptional case, as it was surrounded by water and the province of Nova Scotia to the south and west, and to predominantly francophone areas to the north and east that would become significant minorities were they added to the district. The 2013 boundaries commission refused to persist the exception and added the francophone village of Memramcook from the former riding of Memramcook-Lakeville-Dieppe to the district, giving the riding the new name of Memramcook-Tantramar. This change is the subject of a constitutional challenge by francophone activists.

Following the 2023 redistribution, the riding was renamed back to Tantramar.

This was the first seat to elect a New Democrat to the legislature, in 1982.

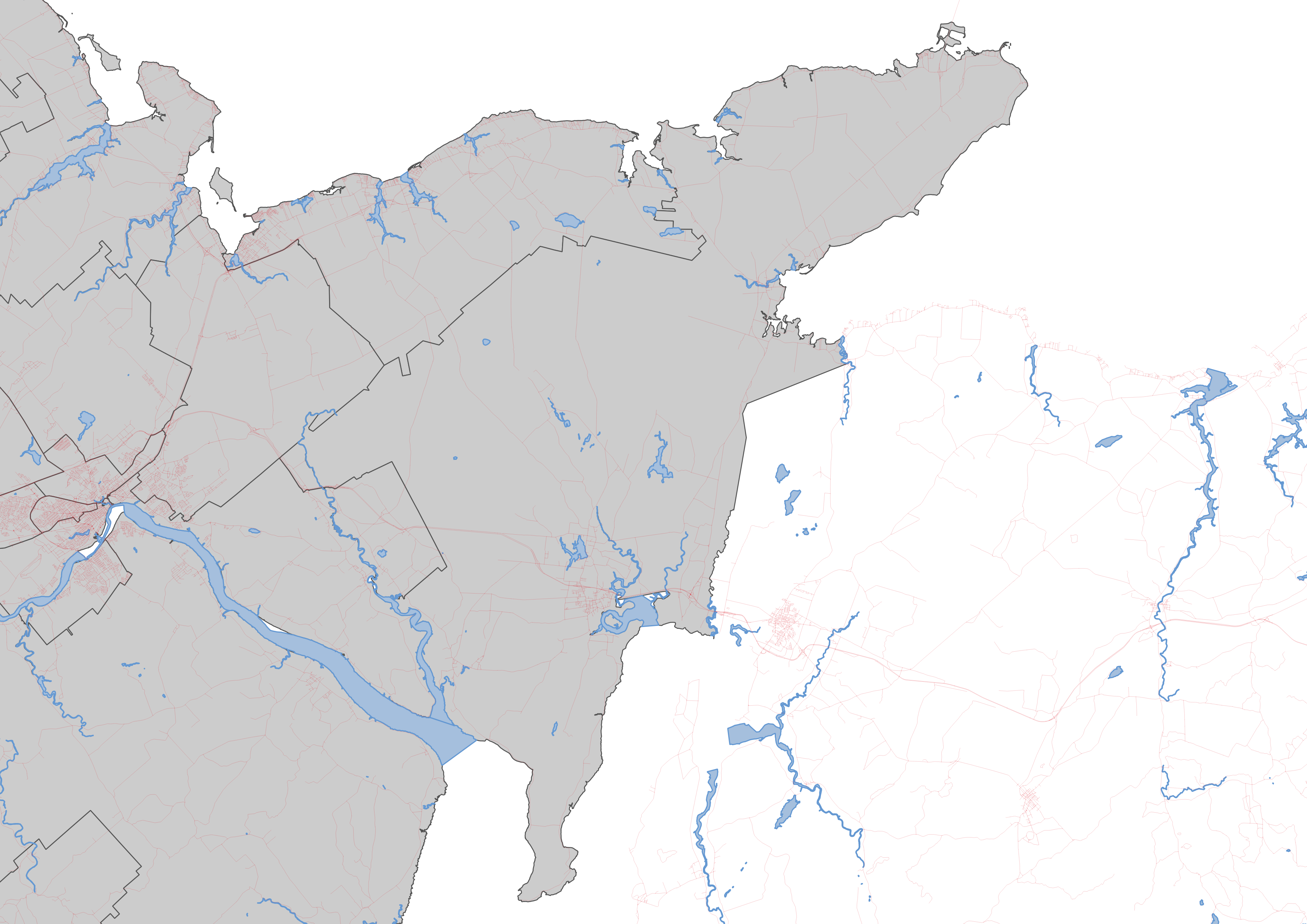
Tantramar (as it exists from 2023) and the roads in the riding

== Members of the Legislative Assembly ==
Assembly	Years	Member	Party
Tantramar; Riding created from Westmorland
48th	1974–1978	Lloyd Folkins	Progressive Conservative
49th	1978–1982	Lloyd Folkins	Progressive Conservative
50th	1982–1987	Robert Arthur Hall	New Democratic
51st	1987–1991	Marilyn Trenholme	Liberal
52nd	1991–1995	Marilyn Trenholme	Liberal
53rd	1995–1997	Marilyn Trenholme	Liberal
53rd	1997–1999	Peter Mesheau	Progressive Conservative
54th	1999–2003	Peter Mesheau	Progressive Conservative
55th	2003–2006	Peter Mesheau	Progressive Conservative
56th	2006–2010	Mike Olscamp	Progressive Conservative
57th	2010–2014	Mike Olscamp	Progressive Conservative
Memramcook-Tantramar
58th	2014–2018	Bernard LeBlanc	Liberal
59th	2018–2020	Megan Mitton	Green
60th	2020–2024	Megan Mitton	Green
Tantramar
61st	2024–Present	Megan Mitton	Green

== Election results ==
=== Tantramar ===
2024 New Brunswick general election
Party	Candidate	Votes	%	±%
Green	Megan Mitton	2,468	48.9%	+7.29
Liberal	John Higham	1,276	25.3%	-9.96
Progressive Conservative	Bruce Phinney	1,166	23.1%	+2.71
New Democratic	Evelyne Godfrey	84	1.7%	
Libertarian	Donna Allen	57	1.1%	
Total valid votes		5,051		
Total rejected ballots				
Turnout				
Eligible voters				
Green hold		Swing		
Source: Elections New Brunswick

=== Memramcook-Tantramar ===
2020 New Brunswick general election
Party	Candidate	Votes	%	±%
Green	Megan Mitton	3,425	41.61	+3.28
Liberal	Maxime Bourgeois	2,902	35.26	-2.94
Progressive Conservative	Carole Duguay	1,678	20.39	+1.90
People's Alliance	Heather Collins	192	2.33	
Independent	Jefferson George Wright	34	0.41	
Total valid votes		8,231		
Total rejected ballots		13	0.16	-0.13
Turnout		8,244	70.36	+1.03
Eligible voters		11,717		
Green hold		Swing		+3.11
Source: Elections New Brunswick

2018 New Brunswick general election
Party	Candidate	Votes	%	±%
Green	Megan Mitton	3,148	38.33	+23.03
Liberal	Bernard LeBlanc	3,137	38.20	-7.44
Progressive Conservative	Etienne Gaudet	1,518	18.48	-7.96
New Democratic	Hélène Boudreau	410	4.99	-7.63
Total valid votes		8,213	99.71	
Total rejected ballots		24	0.29	-0.17
Turnout		8,237	69.33	
Eligible voters		11,881		
Green gain from Liberal		Swing		+15.24

2014 New Brunswick general election
Party	Candidate	Votes	%	±%
Liberal	Bernard LeBlanc	3,515	45.64	+26.67
Progressive Conservative	Mike Olscamp	2,037	26.45	-30.23
Green	Megan Mitton	1,178	15.29	+1.64
New Democratic	Hélène Boudreau	972	12.62	+1.92
Total valid votes		7,702	100.0	
Total rejected ballots		36	0.47	
Turnout		7,738	66.56	
Eligible voters		11,626		
Liberal notional gain from Progressive Conservative		Swing		+28.45
Source: Elections New Brunswick

=== Tantramar ===
2010 New Brunswick general election
Party	Candidate	Votes	%	±%
Progressive Conservative	Mike Olscamp	2,707	56.68	+2.27
Liberal	Beth Barczyk	906	18.97	-15.78
Green	Margaret Tusz-King	652	13.65	–
New Democratic	Bill Evans	511	10.70	-0.14
Total valid votes		4,776	100.0	
Total rejected ballots		23	0.48	
Turnout		4,799	66.29	
Eligible voters		7,239		
Progressive Conservative hold		Swing		+9.02
Source: Elections New Brunswick

2006 New Brunswick general election
Party	Candidate	Votes	%	±%
Progressive Conservative	Mike Olscamp	2,690	54.41	-3.88
Liberal	John Higham	1,718	34.75	+3.45
New Democratic	Virgil Hammock	536	10.84	+0.43
Total valid votes		4,944		
Progressive Conservative hold		Swing		-3.66

2003 New Brunswick general election
Party	Candidate	Votes	%	±%
Progressive Conservative	Peter Mesheau	2,922	58.29	-4.50
Liberal	Susan Purdy	1,569	31.30	+13.76
New Democratic	Geoff Martin	522	10.41	-8.36
Total valid votes		5,013		
Progressive Conservative hold		Swing		-9.13

1999 New Brunswick general election
Party	Candidate	Votes	%	±%
Progressive Conservative	Peter Mesheau	3,311	62.79	+28.74
New Democratic	Heather Patterson	990	18.77	-11.44
Liberal	Kirk W. Meldrum	925	17.54	-15.68
Independent	Frank Comeau	47	0.89	–
Total valid votes		5,273		
Progressive Conservative hold		Swing		+20.09

New Brunswick provincial by-election, 1997
Party	Candidate	Votes	%	±%
Progressive Conservative	Peter Mesheau	1,597	34.05	+22.08
Liberal	Ross Monk	1,558	33.22	-29.25
New Democratic	Heather Patterson	1,417	30.21	+14.77
Confederation of Regions	Greg Hargrove	118	2.52	-7.60
Total valid votes		4,690		
Progressive Conservative gain from Liberal		Swing		+25.66
Greg Hargrove was the leader of CoR running as a parachute candidate.

1995 New Brunswick general election
Party	Candidate	Votes	%	±%
Liberal	Marilyn Trenholme	3,414	62.47	+12.95
New Democratic	Berkeley Fleming	844	15.44	-7.92
Progressive Conservative	H. Eric Wheeler	654	11.97	+2.82
Confederation of Regions	Julia Elnora Stevens	553	10.12	-7.84
Total valid votes		5,465		
Liberal hold		Swing		+10.44

1991 New Brunswick general election
Party	Candidate	Votes	%	±%
Liberal	Marilyn Trenholme	3,008	49.52	-2.54
New Democratic	Robert Arthur Hall	1,419	23.36	-6.71
Confederation of Regions	Clarke Edgar Sheppard	1,091	17.96	–
Progressive Conservative	William R. Campbell	556	9.15	-8.72
Total valid votes		6,074		
Liberal hold		Swing		+2.08

1987 New Brunswick general election
Party	Candidate	Votes	%	±%
Liberal	Marilyn Trenholme	3,160	52.06	+29.45
New Democratic	Robert Arthur Hall	1,825	30.07	-12.35
Progressive Conservative	Lloyd Folkins	1,085	17.87	-17.10
Total valid votes		6,070		
Liberal gain from New Democratic		Swing		+20.90

1982 New Brunswick general election
Party	Candidate	Votes	%	±%
New Democratic	Robert Arthur Hall	2,503	42.42	+5.24
Progressive Conservative	Irvin D. Robinson	2,063	34.97	-4.04
Liberal	John Gideon Carter	1,334	22.61	-1.20
Total valid votes		5,900		
New Democratic gain from Progressive Conservative		Swing		+4.64

1978 New Brunswick general election
Party	Candidate	Votes	%	±%
Progressive Conservative	Lloyd Folkins	2,019	39.01	-6.34
New Democratic	Robert Arthur Hall	1,924	37.18	+22.07
Liberal	James G. Purdy	1,232	23.81	-15.73
Total valid votes		5,175		
Progressive Conservative hold		Swing		-14.20

1974 New Brunswick general election
Party	Candidate	Votes	%
Progressive Conservative	Lloyd Folkins	2,402	45.35
Liberal	John Bryden	2,094	39.54
New Democratic	Colin McCabe	800	15.11
Total valid votes		5,296	
The previous multi-member riding of Westmorland went totally Liberal in the previous election. Neither of the four incumbents ran in this election.

== See also ==
- List of New Brunswick provincial electoral districts
- Canadian provincial electoral districts
