= Jill Green (politician) =

Canadian politician

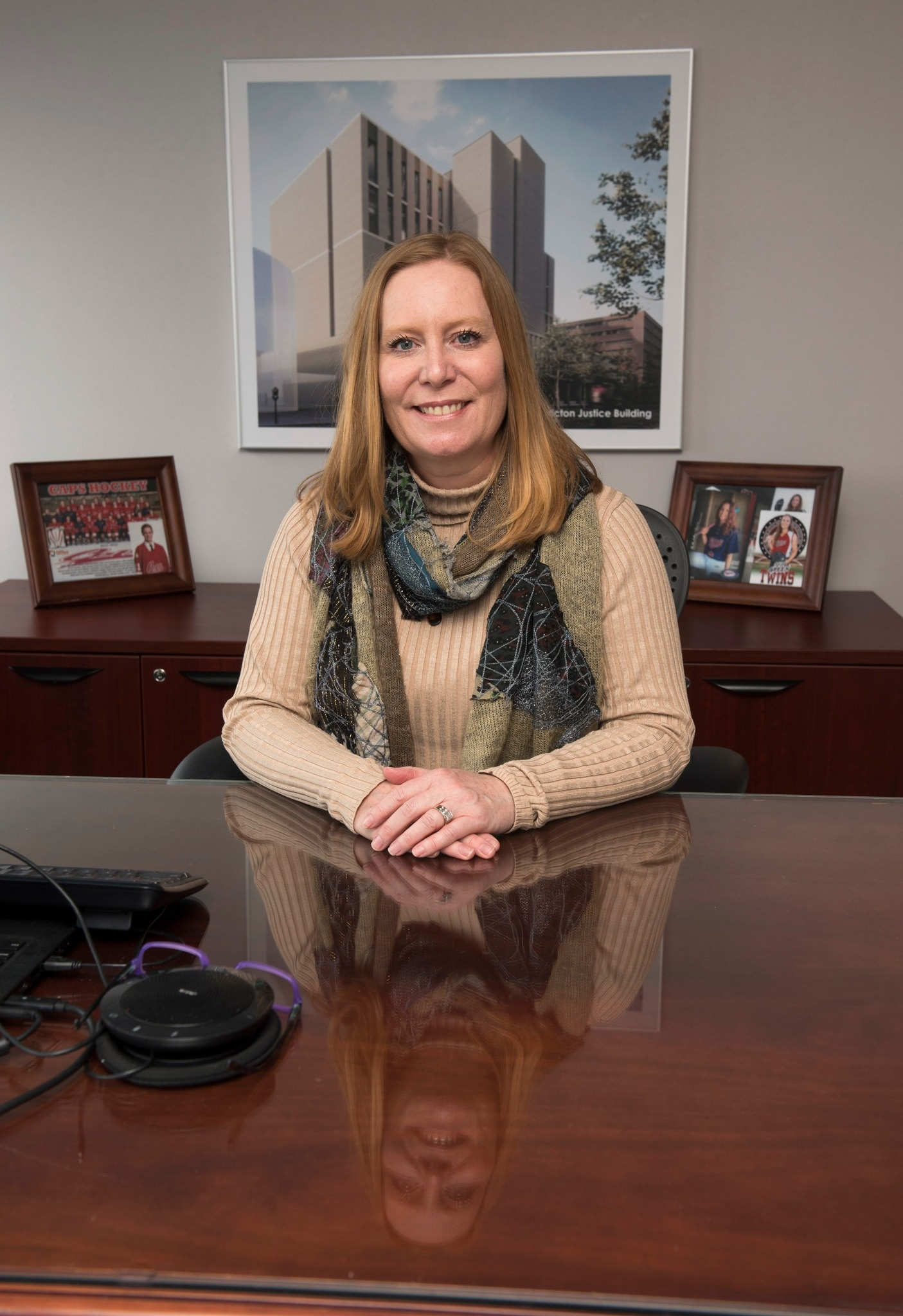

Minister of Social Development
- In office June 27, 2023 – November 2, 2024
- Premier: Blaine Higgs
- Preceded by: Dorothy Shephard
- Succeeded by: Cindy Miles

Minister of Service New Brunswick
- In office October 13, 2022 – June 27, 2023
- Preceded by: Mary Wilson
- Succeeded by: Mary Wilson

Minister of Transportation and Infrastructure
- In office September 29, 2020 – October 13, 2022
- Preceded by: Bill Oliver
- Succeeded by: Jeff Carr

Member of the New Brunswick Legislative Assembly for Fredericton North
- In office September 14, 2020 – September 19, 2024
- Preceded by: Stephen Horsman
- Succeeded by: Luke Randall

Personal details
- Party: Progressive Conservative

Jill Green is a Canadian Progressive Conservative politician who represented Fredericton North in the Legislative Assembly of New Brunswick from 2020 until her defeat in the 2024 New Brunswick general election. Green was a member of the Executive Council of New Brunswick as Minister of Transportation and Infrastructure from 2020 until 2022, Minister of Service New Brunswick from 2022 until 2023 and Minister of Social Development from 2023 until 2024.

Green was born in Fredericton North, and graduated in 1995 with a degree in civil engineering from the University of New Brunswick. She is a Fellow in the Canadian Academy of Engineers, and received the 2017 BMO Innovation and Global Growth Award for her work as a CEO in engineering.

== Electoral history ==
2024 New Brunswick general election: Fredericton North
Party	Candidate	Votes	%	±%
Liberal	Luke Randall	4,130	51.13	+32.7
Progressive Conservative	Jill Green	2,753	34.08	-7.5
Green	Anthea Plummer	922	11.41	-19.8
New Democratic	Matthew Stocek	120	1.49	+0.3
People's Alliance	Glen Davis	107	1.32	-6.3
Libertarian	Andrew Vandette	46	0.57	
Total valid votes		8,078	99.80	
Total rejected ballots		16	0.20	
Turnout		8,094	64.99	
Eligible voters		12,454		
Liberal gain from Progressive Conservative		Swing		+20.1
Source: Elections New Brunswick

2020 New Brunswick general election: Fredericton North
Party	Candidate	Votes	%	±%
Progressive Conservative	Jill Green	3,226	41.12	+12.89
Green	Luke Randall	2,464	31.41	+14.42
Liberal	Stephen Horsman	1,464	18.66	-12.95
People's Alliance	Allen Price	591	7.53	-13.83
New Democratic	Mackenzie Thomason	100	1.27	-0.53
Total valid votes		7,845	100.0	
Total rejected ballots		42	0.53	
Turnout		7,887	67.87	
Eligible voters		11,620		
Progressive Conservative gain from Liberal		Swing		-0.77

2018 New Brunswick general election: Fredericton North
Party	Candidate	Votes	%	±%
Liberal	Stephen Horsman	2,443	31.61	-1.99
Progressive Conservative	Jill Green	2,182	28.23	-3.50
People's Alliance	Lynn King	1,651	21.36	+17.21
Green	Tamara White	1,313	16.99	+6.72
New Democratic	Scarlett Tays	139	1.80	-18.45
Total valid votes		7,728	99.79	
Total rejected ballots		16	0.21	-0.03
Turnout		7,744	66.48	+0.34
Eligible voters		11,648		
Liberal hold		Swing		+0.75
