= Serge Brideau =

Canadian singer and politician

- Born: Tracadie, New Brunswick, Canada
- Occupations: Singer, politician
- Musical career
- Genres: Folk; rock
- Member of: Les Hôtesses d'Hilaire

Personal details
- Party: Green

Serge Brideau is a Canadian singer and politician who is a member of Les Hôtesses d'Hilaire, an Acadian folk-rock band in New Brunswick. Within politics, Brideau has run for the provincial legislature as a member of the Green Party of New Brunswick. He was the Green candidate for the Tracadie riding in the 2024 provincial election.

== Career ==
Brideau is from Tracadie. He is a member of Les Hôtesses d'Hilaire as its singer. Brideau has also served as an activist and as vice-president of the Acadian Society of New Brunswick.

In 2019, Brideau was the subject of media attention after improvising lyrics during a National Acadian Day performance to criticize the unilingual Premier Blaine Higgs, while also raising the middle finger. During the COVID-19 pandemic, Brideau worked as a caregiver.

In 2023, Brideau ran for the Legislative Assembly of New Brunswick as the Green Party candidate in the by-election of the Bathurst East-Nepisiguit-Saint-Isidore riding held on April 24, though was defeated by New Brunswick Liberal Association leader Susan Holt. He ran for the Green Party in the 2024 provincial election in the riding of Tracadie, but was defeated by Liberal candidate Keith Chiasson.

== Election results ==
2024 New Brunswick general election: Tracadie
Party	Candidate	Votes	%	±%
Liberal	Keith Chiasson	5,030	53.53	−16.67
Green	Serge Brideau	3,829	40.75	+33.35
Progressive Conservative	Gertrude Mclaughlin	537	5.72	−16.68
Total valid votes		9,396	100.0	
Liberal hold		Swing		
Source: Elections New Brunswick
