= Jim Wilson (New Brunswick politician) =

Canadian politician

Member of the Legislative Assembly of New Brunswick
- In office 1987–1991; 1995–1999
- Preceded by: Lawrence Garvie; Edwin G. Allen
- Succeeded by: Edwin G. Allen; D. Peter Forbes
- Constituency: Fredericton North

Personal details
- Born: July 31, 1937 Fredericton, New Brunswick
- Died: July 10, 2005 (aged 67) Fredericton, New Brunswick
- Party: New Brunswick Liberal Association
- Spouse: Mary Brown
- Children: 2
- Occupation: businessman

James E. Wilson (July 31, 1937 – July 10, 2005) was a Canadian politician. He served in the Legislative Assembly of New Brunswick as a Liberal member from the constituency of Fredericton North.
