= Denis Losier =

Canadian politician

Denis Losier PC CM (born June 14, 1952) is a businessman, economist and former public servant and politician. He was appointed to the Security Intelligence Review Committee on September 3, 2008 and by virtue of that position has been sworn in as a member of the Queen's Privy Council for Canada.

Educated at the University of Moncton and the University of Western Ontario as an economist, Losier worked for the federal Ministry for Regional Industrial Expansion in the 1970s. He has also served as president of the Société des Acadiens du Nouveau-Brunswick.

From 1984 to 1986 he was First Secretary for Industrial Cooperation at the Canadian Embassy in Paris. Upon his return to Canada he became Executive Director of the Conseil d'Entreprises du Nouveau-Brunswick.

In 2011, he was made a Member of the Order of Canada.

He is married to Cécile Mallais and they have three children: Joshua, Jessica and Andrée Pascale.

== Political career ==
In 1988, he was appointed Deputy Commissioner of Economic Development in the office of New Brunswick Premier Frank McKenna and, later that year, was elected to the Legislative Assembly of New Brunswick as the Liberal MLA for Tracadie. He was re-elected in 1991.

Losier served as Minister of Fisheries and Aquaculture from 1989 to 1991 when he was appointed Minister of Commerce and Technology and Minister of Tourism, Recreation and Heritage which was combined into the position of Minister of Economic Development and Tourism. He retired from the position and from cabinet in 1994.

== Business career ==
Losier has been President and Chief Executive Officer of the Assumption Mutual Life Insurance Company of Moncton from September 1, 1994 until his retirement in 2012. He also served as Chairman of Assumption Life's subsidiaries and Louisbourg Investments, a company specializing in pension fund management, as well as for several associations and groups, namely, Atlantic Provinces Economic Council, Conseil économique du N.-B., Beauséjour Regional Health Authority, Fondation Dr-Georges-L.-Dumont, Atlantic Cancer Research Institute as well as chair of its Discoveries Campaign. He is a former member of the Board of the Canadian Life and Health Insurance Association, NAV CANADA and Canadian Blood Services.
