= Serge Rousselle =

Canadian politician

Serge Rousselle MLA
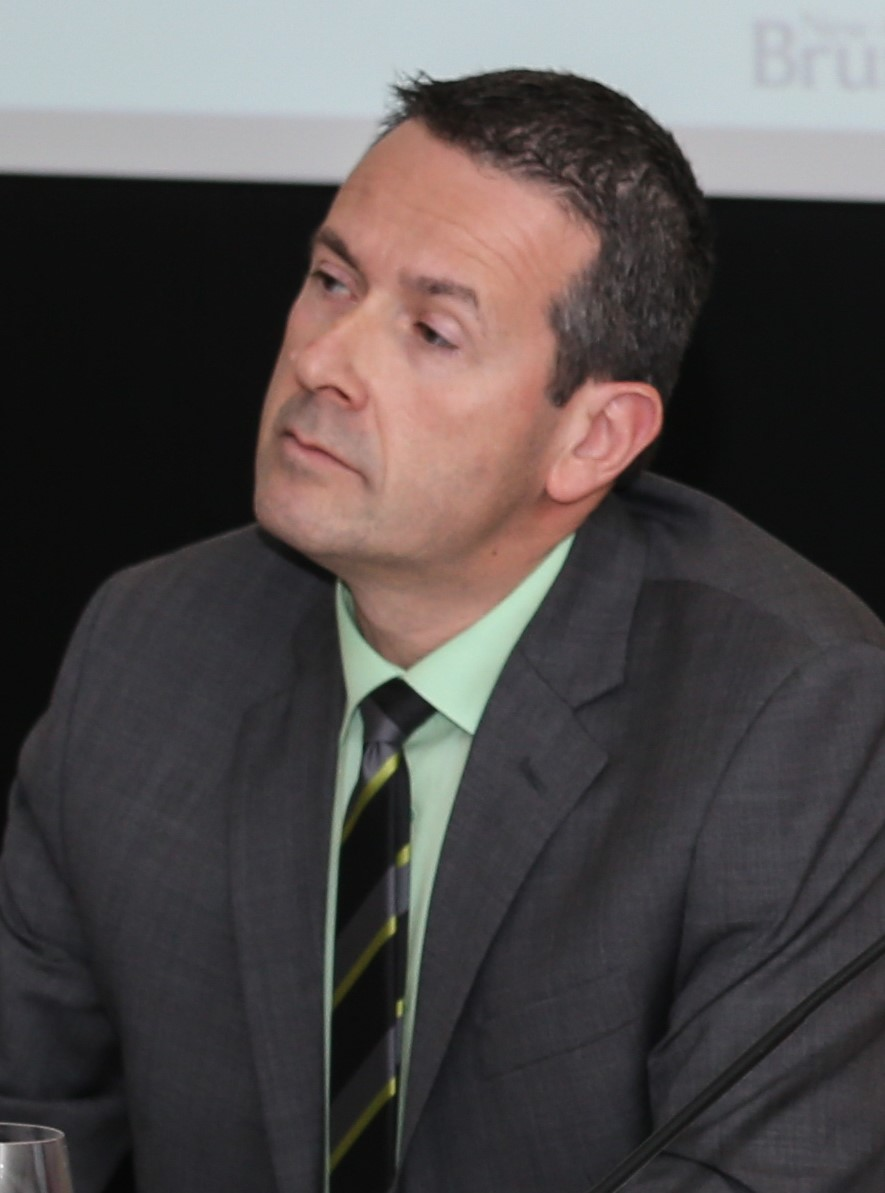
- Rousselle in 2017

Minister of Government Services
- In office September 5, 2017 – May 11, 2018
- Premier: Brian Gallant
- Preceded by: Ed Doherty
- Succeeded by: Benoit Bourque

Minister of Environment and Local Government
- In office June 6, 2016 – May 11, 2018
- Premier: Brian Gallant
- Preceded by: Brian Kenny
- Succeeded by: Andrew Harvey

Attorney General of New Brunswick
- In office October 7, 2014 – May 11, 2018
- Premier: Brian Gallant
- Preceded by: Ted Flemming
- Succeeded by: Brian Gallant

Minister of Education and Early Childhood Development
- In office October 7, 2014 – June 6, 2016
- Premier: Brian Gallant
- Preceded by: Marie-Claude Blais
- Succeeded by: Brian Kenny

Member of the New Brunswick Legislative Assembly for Tracadie-Sheila
- In office September 22, 2014 – 2018
- Preceded by: Claude Landry
- Succeeded by: Keith Chiasson

Personal details
- Party: Liberal

Serge Rousselle is a Canadian politician, who was elected to the Legislative Assembly of New Brunswick in the 2014 provincial election. He represented the electoral district of Tracadie-Sheila as a member of the Liberal Party until 2018, when he did not run for reelection and was succeeded by his former constituency assistant Keith Chiasson.

On October 7, 2014, Rousselle was appointed to the Executive Council of New Brunswick as Minister of Education and Early Childhood Development, and Attorney General.

He holds undergraduate degrees in political science and law from the University of Ottawa as well as a Master of Law from the University of Cambridge and a Doctor of Law from McGill University. After being abroad for his studies, he returned to Tracadie, New Brunswick, and was a professor at the Université de Moncton law faculty from 1992 to 2014. He served as dean from 2000 to 2004.

Rousselle has also held various positions in organizations at the provincial, federal, and international level. Among other positions, he was head of the Bureau des Amériques of the Agence universitaire de la Francophonie, was President of the Council of Canadian Law Deans as well as President of the Association des juristes d’expression française du Nouveau-Brunswick.

Rousselle is the co-author of the book entitled "Éducation et droits collectifs : au-delà de l'article 23 de la Charte" (2003, Editions de la francophonie), which was awarded the 2003 France-Acadie award.

== Election results ==
2014 New Brunswick general election
Party	Candidate	Votes	%	±%
Liberal	Serge Rousselle	5,916	64.61	+45.65
Progressive Conservative	Claude Landry	2,195	23.97	-24.86
New Democratic	François Rousselle	861	9.40	-22.81
Green	Nancy Benoit	121	1.32	–
Independent	Donald Thomas	64	0.70	–
Total valid votes		9,157	100.0	
Total rejected ballots		30	0.33	
Turnout		9,187	76.92	
Eligible voters		11,943		
Liberal notional gain from Progressive Conservative		Swing		+35.26

2006 New Brunswick general election: Tracadie-Sheila
Party	Candidate	Votes	%	±%
Progressive Conservative	Claude Landry	4,043	53.38	-2.94
Liberal	Serge Rousselle	3,281	43.32	+7.76
Independent	Stéphane Richardson	250	3.30	–
Total valid votes		7,574		
Total rejected, unmarked and declined ballots		135	1.75	-0.39
Turnout		7,709	84.87	-0.24
Progressive Conservative hold		Swing		-5.35
Independent candidate Stéphane Richardson earned 4.82% fewer votes than when he ran for the New Democratic Party in 2003. Changes are not based on redistributed results.

2004 Canadian federal election: Acadie—Bathurst
Party	Candidate	Votes	%	±%	Expenditures
New Democratic	Yvon Godin	23,857	53.93	+7.26	$61,745.98
Liberal	Serge Rousselle	14,452	32.67	-7.75	$60,252.15
Conservative	Joel Bernard	4,841	10.94	-1.97	$51,943.73
Green	Mario Lanteigne	1,085	2.45	–	$7,040.66
Total valid votes/Expense limit		44,235	100.0		$71,582
Total rejected, unmarked and declined ballots		527	1.18	-0.04	
Turnout		44,762	70.38	-4.99	
Eligible voters		63,603			
New Democratic notional hold		Swing		+7.50	
Changes from 2000 are based on redistributed results. Conservative Party change is based on the combination of Canadian Alliance and Progressive Conservative Party totals.

1999 New Brunswick general election: Tracadie-Sheila
Party	Candidate	Votes	%	±%
Progressive Conservative	Elvy Robichaud	5,453	62.94	+11.48
Liberal	Serge Rousselle	2,926	33.77	-12.67
New Democratic	Claudette Duguay	285	3.29	+1.19
Total valid votes		8,664		
Progressive Conservative hold		Swing		+12.08
