= Les Hôtesses d'Hilaire =

Canadian rock band

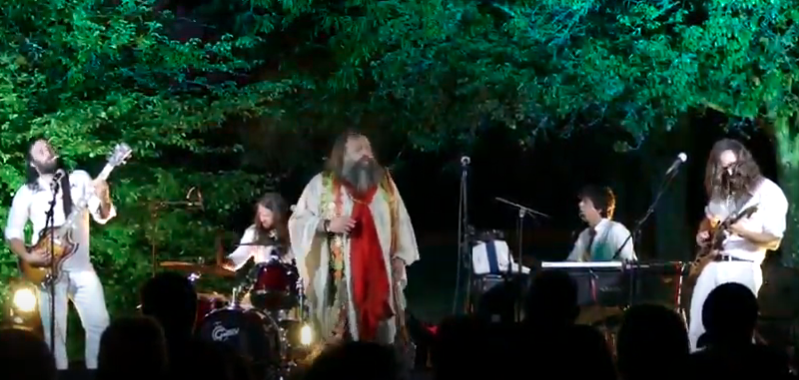
- Left to right Michel Vienneau, Maxence Cormier, Serge Brideau, Léandre Bourgeois, Mico Roy

Background information
- Origin: Moncton, New Brunswick, Canada
- Genres: Alternative rock; Progressive rock; psychedelic rock; Garage rock; Art rock; Hard rock
- Years active: 2012–present
- Label: L-A be
- Members: Maxence Cormier; Michel Vienneau; Mico Roy; Léandre Bourgeois; Serge Brideau
- Past members: Guillaume Lavoie
- Website: leshotessesdhilaire.com

Les Hôtesses d'Hilaire is a Canadian rock band based in Moncton, New Brunswick.

== History ==
Bass player Michel Vienneau, drummer Guillaume Lavoie, and guitarist Mico Roy formed a three-piece band, when Mico Roy urged the bandmates to join with singer/songwriter Serge Brideau (then playing under Serge Brido). Guillaume Lavoie left the band to move to Montreal and was replaced by percussionist Maxence Cormier. Around the same time, keyboardist Léandre Bourgeois joined the band.

At first, the band performed under the name Serge et ses orifices ("Serge and his orifices"), but later changed its name to Les Hôtesses d'Hilaire in honour of Serge's father, Hilaire.

In 2012 the band released its more acoustic-based EP, which was then followed by three studio albums, and one live album. In 2018 the band received critical acclaim for the rock opera Viens avec moi, which was also released as both a live and a studio album. The studio album was performed by the band, and the live version was performed by the band and the original cast.

In 2016, the band started receiving critical recognition, winning four New Brunswick Music prizes that year: Rock artist of the Year, Group Recording of the Year (for Touche-moi pas là), Enregistrement de l'année (for Touche-moi pas là), and Choix du public. They again won Rock artist of the Year in 2017. They also received 5 public choice awards. They also received numerous nominations at the ADISQ in 2016 and 2019. The band became the object of controversy when in 2017, while playing in the Radio-Canada show Entrée Principale, Serge Brideau performed wearing a pink dress. That same year, they received two prizes at the East Coast Music Awards.

All members of the band, as well as Benoit Bouchard, Pascal Lejeune, and Pierre-Guy Blanchard take part in composing the band's songs.

== Activism and social engagement ==
The band often incorporates political themes or stances in their lyrics, or in their public performances, most notably relating to the politics of New Brunswick. Among the main issues noticeable are bilingualism and French language / Acadian rights. This led notably to a direct call-out of New Brunswick Premier Blaine Higgs's unilingualism at the Acadian World Congress (Congrès Mondial Acadien) in 2019.

The band's frontman, Serge Brideau, is also a vocal advocate against numerous social and economical issues, among which conjugal violence. In 2020 he held a fund drive for Accueil Sainte-Famille in Tracadie, NB., where he raised $24,292. The profits derived for the album Live à Caraquet – 15 août also go directly to Accueil Sainte-Famille, Tracadie. In 2020, Brideau also became vice-president of the Acadian Society of New Brunswick. Alongside lobbying for bilingual rights, he also actively lobbies in regards to the lack of healthcare workers who take care of the elderly, and in retirement homes.

== Tributes ==
Il the spring of 2022, the Edmundston-base brewery Brasserie du Petit-Sault released a tribute Witbier called "Hilaire à boire". The can shows a stylized version of the Hilaire à boire album cover and the Live à Caraquet - 15 août album cover.

== Discography ==
=== Studio albums ===
- Hilaire à boire (2013)
- Party de ruisseau (2014)
- Touche-moi pas là (2015)
- Viens avec moi (studio album) (2018)
- Pas l'temps d'niaiser (2022)

=== Live albums ===
- Viens avec moi - live (2019)
- Live à Caraquet – 15 août (2020)

=== EPs ===
- Les Hôtesses d'Hilaire EP (2012)
