= Luke Randall =

Canadian politician

Luke Randall MLA

Minister responsible for Opportunities NB
- Incumbent
- Assumed office November 2, 2024
- Premier: Susan Holt
- Preceded by: Greg Turner

Minister responsible for Economic Development and Small Business
- Incumbent
- Assumed office November 2, 2024
- Premier: Susan Holt
- Preceded by: Greg Turner

Minister responsible for NB Liquor and Cannabis NB
- Incumbent
- Assumed office November 2, 2024
- Premier: Susan Holt

Member of the Legislative Assembly of New Brunswick for Fredericton North
- Incumbent
- Assumed office October 21, 2024
- Preceded by: Jill Green

Personal details
- Party: Liberal

Luke Randall is a Canadian politician, who was elected to the Legislative Assembly of New Brunswick in the 2024 New Brunswick general election. He represents the electoral district of Fredericton North as a member of the New Brunswick Liberal Association.

Prior to his election to the legislature, Randall and his husband Tyler were co-owners of Endeavours and ThinkPlay, an art and gaming supply store in downtown Fredericton. He previously ran as a Green Party candidate for the same district in the 2020 New Brunswick general election, switching to the Liberals in 2024 due to his support of Liberal leader Susan Holt.

He is the province's first out gay member of the Legislative Assembly, as Richard Hatfield was not out during his political career.

On November 1, 2024, it was announced that he was placed on the cabinet as Minister responsible for Opportunities NB, Minister responsible for Economic Development and Small Business, and Minister responsible for NB Liquor and Cannabis NB.

== Electoral record ==
2024 New Brunswick general election: Fredericton North
Party	Candidate	Votes	%	±%
Liberal	Luke Randall	4,130	51.13	+32.7
Progressive Conservative	Jill Green	2,753	34.08	-7.5
Green	Anthea Plummer	922	11.41	-19.8
New Democratic	Matthew Stocek	120	1.49	+0.3
People's Alliance	Glen Davis	107	1.32	-6.3
Libertarian	Andrew Vandette	46	0.57	
Total valid votes		8,078	99.80	
Total rejected ballots		16	0.20	
Turnout		8,094	64.99	
Eligible voters		12,454		
Liberal gain from Progressive Conservative		Swing		+20.1
Source: Elections New Brunswick

2020 New Brunswick general election
Party	Candidate	Votes	%	±%
Progressive Conservative	Jill Green	3,227	41.13	+12.89
Green	Luke Randall	2,464	31.40	+14.41
Liberal	Stephen Horsman	1,464	18.66	-12.95
People's Alliance	Allen Price	591	7.53	-13.83
New Democratic	Mackenzie Thomason	100	1.27	-0.52
Total valid votes		7,846	99.47	
Total rejected ballots		42	0.53	+0.33
Turnout		7,888	66.29	-0.20
Eligible voters		11,900		
Progressive Conservative gain from Liberal		Swing		+12.92
