= ANBL =

ANBL may refer to:

- Alcool NB Liquor (or New Brunswick Liquor Corporation)
- Australian National Basketball League, the pre-eminent professional men's basketball league in Oceania
