= Keith Chiasson =

Canadian politician

Keith Chiasson MLA

Minister of Indigenous Affairs
- Incumbent
- Assumed office November 2, 2024
- Premier: Susan Holt
- Preceded by: Réjean Savoie

Member of the New Brunswick Legislative Assembly for Tracadie-Sheila
- Incumbent
- Assumed office September 24, 2018
- Preceded by: Serge Rousselle

Personal details
- Party: Liberal

Keith Raymond Chiasson is a Canadian politician, who was elected to the Legislative Assembly of New Brunswick in the 2018 election. He represents the electoral district of Tracadie-Sheila as a member of the Liberal Party.

Chiasson was re-elected in the 2020 provincial election. As of September 8, 2024, he serves as the Official Opposition critic for Local Government and Local Governance Reform. He was re-elected in the 2024 general election in the riding of Tracadie. On November 1, 2024, it was announced that he was placed on the cabinet as Minister of Indigenous Affairs.

== Election results ==
2024 New Brunswick general election: Tracadie
Party	Candidate	Votes	%	±%
Liberal	Keith Chiasson	5,030	53.53	−16.67
Green	Serge Brideau	3,829	40.75	+33.35
Progressive Conservative	Gertrude Mclaughlin	537	5.72	−16.68
Total valid votes		9,396	100.0	
Liberal hold		Swing		
Source: Elections New Brunswick

2020 New Brunswick general election
Party	Candidate	Votes	%	±%
Liberal	Keith Chiasson	6,175	69.55	+20.77
Progressive Conservative	Diane Carey	2,059	23.19	-3.79
Green	Chris LeBlanc	645	7.26	+2.86
Total valid votes		8,879	100.00	
Total rejected ballots		56	0.63	-0.07
Turnout		8,935	75.28	+1.12
Eligible voters		11,869		
Liberal hold		Swing		+12.28
Source: Elections New Brunswick

2018 New Brunswick general election
Party	Candidate	Votes	%	±%
Liberal	Keith Chiasson	4,320	48.77	-15.83
Progressive Conservative	Claude Landry	2,390	26.98	+3.01
New Democratic	Francis Duguay	1,213	13.70	+4.29
Independent	Stéphane Richardson	544	6.14	
Green	Nancy Benoit	390	4.40	+3.08
Total valid votes		8,861	99.30	
Total rejected ballots		62	0.70	+0.37
Turnout		8,919	74.53	-2.39
Eligible voters		11,967		
Liberal hold		Swing		-9.42
