= Cannabis NB =

Canadian cannabis retailer

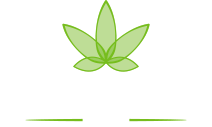
- Company type: Crown corporation
- Industry: Retail
- Founded: October 17, 2018; 7 years ago
- Headquarters: Canada
- Number of locations: 26
- Key people: Lori Stickles (CEO); Luke Randall (Minister)
- Products: Cannabis sales and distribution
- Net income: $5.1 million (1st quarter 2023)
- Owner: Government of New Brunswick
- Parent: New Brunswick Liquor Corporation
- Website: cannabis-nb.com

Cannabis NB (CNB) is a Crown corporation responsible for retail sales of cannabis products in the Canadian province of New Brunswick. It is incorporated as a subsidiary of the New Brunswick Liquor Corporation.

== History ==
In 2017, the New Brunswick government announced the establishment of up to 20 cannabis distributor locations in 15 communities, all operated by NB Liquor. By December 2017, 11 of these locations were granted and were to be opened in July 2018.

Cannabis NB was established in 2018, following the introduction of the Cannabis Act, legalizing cannabis use across Canada. After initially struggling financially, Cannabis NB started profiting towards the end of 2019 and fully paid off $37 million from startup costs in February 2022.
