= Tracadie (electoral district) =

Provincial electoral district in New Brunswick, Canada

New Brunswick electoral district

Provincial electoral district
- Legislature: Legislative Assembly of New Brunswick
MLA
Keith Chiasson
Liberal
- District created: 2023
- First contested: 2024

Tracadie
New Brunswick electoral district

Defunct provincial electoral district
- Legislature: Legislative Assembly of New Brunswick
- District created: 1973
- District abolished: 1994
- First contested: 1974
- Last contested: 1994

Tracadie is a provincial electoral district for the Legislative Assembly of New Brunswick, Canada. It was originally created in 1974 and was replaced by the Tracadie-Sheila district in 1995. Following the 2023 redistribution, the riding was re-created out of Tracadie-Sheila, Bathurst East-Nepisiguit-Saint-Isidore, Shippagan-Lamèque-Miscou and Caraquet.

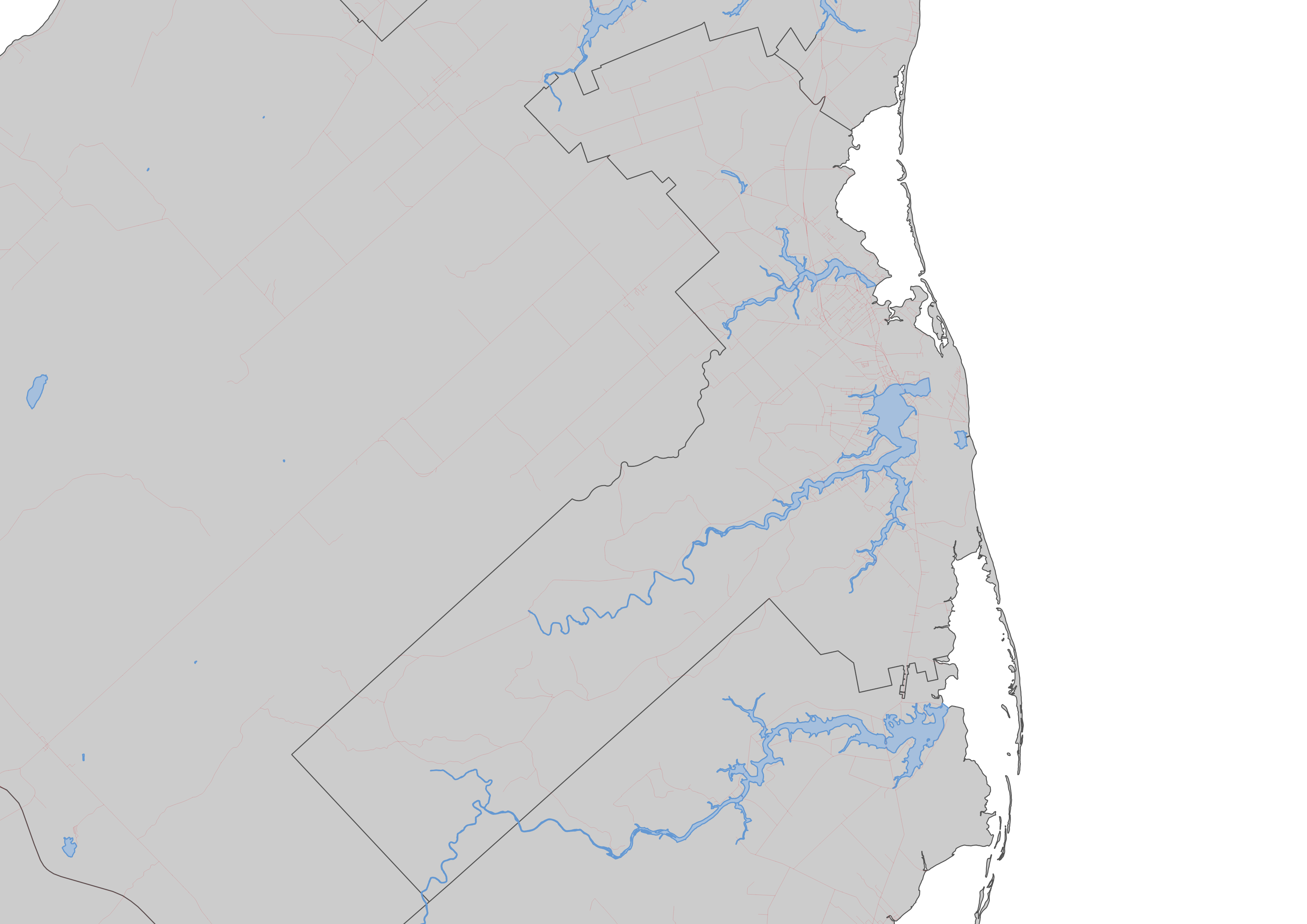
Tracadie (as it exists from 2023) and the roads in the riding

== Members of the Legislative Assembly ==
Assembly	Years	Member	Party
RIding created from Gloucester
48th	1974–1978	Adjutor Ferguson	Liberal
49th	1978–1982	Doug Young	Liberal
50th	1982–1987	Doug Young	Liberal
51st	1987–1988	Doug Young	Liberal
51st	1988–1991	Denis Losier	Liberal
52nd	1991–1994	Denis Losier	Liberal
52nd	1994–1995	Elvy Robichaud	Progressive Conservative
Riding dissolved into Tracadie-Sheila and Centre-Péninsule
Riding re-created from Tracadie-Sheila, Bathurst East-Nepisiguit-Saint-Isidore, Shippagan-Lamèque-Miscou and Caraquet
61st	2024–Present	Keith Chiasson	Liberal

== Election results ==
2024 New Brunswick general election
Party	Candidate	Votes	%	±%
Liberal	Keith Chiasson	5030	53.53	−16.67
Green	Serge Brideau	3829	40.75	+33.35
Progressive Conservative	Gertrude Mclaughlin	537	5.72	−16.68
Total valid votes		9396	100.0	
Liberal hold		Swing		
Source: Elections New Brunswick

2020 provincial election redistributed results
Party	%
Liberal	70.2
Progressive Conservative	22.4
Green	7.4

New Brunswick provincial by-election, 26 September 1994
Party	Candidate	Votes	%	±%
Progressive Conservative	Elvy Robichaud	5,605	56.45	+35.22
Liberal	Aquila Comeau	4,249	42.79	−21.57
Confederation of Regions	Gisèle Blanchard	75	0.76	–
New Democratic	nil	withdrawn		
Total valid votes		9,929	100.0	
Progressive Conservative gain from Liberal		Swing		+28.40

1991 New Brunswick general election
Party	Candidate	Votes	%	±%
Liberal	Denis Losier	6,374	64.36	−18.53
Progressive Conservative	Colette McGraw	2,103	21.23	–
New Democratic	Pierre Cousineau	1,427	14.41	–
Total valid votes		9,904	100.0	
Liberal hold		Swing		−19.88

New Brunswick provincial by-election, 14 November 1988
Party	Candidate	Votes	%	±%
Liberal	Denis Losier	5,359	82.89	+24.29
Independent	Yvon T. McGraw	1,106	17.11	–
Total valid votes		6,465	100.0	
Liberal hold		Swing		+3.59

1987 New Brunswick general election
Party	Candidate	Votes	%	±%
Liberal	Douglas M. Young	5,787	58.60	+1.17
Progressive Conservative	Colette McGraw	3,081	31.20	−6.02
New Democratic	Serge Robichaud	823	8.33	–
Independent	Fernand Losier	184	1.86	−0.23
Total valid votes		9,875	100.0	
Liberal hold		Swing		+3.60

1982 New Brunswick general election
Party	Candidate	Votes	%	±%
Liberal	Doug Young	5,308	57.43	+0.40
Progressive Conservative	Henri Thomas	3,440	37.22	+4.76
Parti acadien	Michael Blanchard	301	3.26	−7.25
Independent	Fernand Losier	193	2.09	–
Total valid votes		9,242	100.0	
Liberal hold		Swing		−2.18

1978 New Brunswick general election
Party	Candidate	Votes	%	±%
Liberal	Douglas M. Young	4,374	57.03	+0.26
Progressive Conservative	George McLaughlin	2,490	32.46	−4.40
Parti acadien	Alyre Morais	806	10.51	+4.14
Total valid votes		7,670	100.0	
Liberal hold		Swing		+2.33

1974 New Brunswick general election
Party	Candidate	Votes	%
Liberal	Adjutor Ferguson	3,501	56.77
Progressive Conservative	Paul Boudreau	2,273	36.86
Parti acadien	Réjean Comeau	393	6.37
Total valid votes		6,167	100.0
The previous multi-member riding of Gloucester elected 5 (of 5) Liberals in the last election, and one Progressive Conservative member was elected in the 1972 by-election. Adjutor Ferguson was one of five incumbents.

== See also ==
- List of New Brunswick provincial electoral districts
- Canadian provincial electoral districts
