= Edwin G. Allen =

Canadian politician

Edwin Gerald Allen (March 8, 1920 – January 10, 2001) was a politician in New Brunswick, Canada. He served in the Legislative Assembly of New Brunswick from 1978 to 1987 and again from 1991 to 1995. His son, Mike Allen, later became a member of the House of Commons of Canada.

He was first elected to the then-safe Progressive Conservative seat of Fredericton North in the 1978 election that produced a nearly deadlocked legislature. He sat as a backbench supporter of Premier Richard Hatfield until after the 1982 election, in which the Conservatives won a large majority, when he was named to the cabinet as Minister of Supply and Services. He was defeated in the 1987 election which saw the PC Party lose all of its seats.

Following his defeat, he became a member of the new Confederation of Regions Party, known as CoR, which was formed by many anglophone conservatives. Running under the CoR banner, he was re-elected to his old seat in 1991. CoR formed the official opposition and he became house leader. He did not seek re-election in 1995.
