= Fredericton North =

Provincial electoral district in New Brunswick, Canada

Fredericton North (2014-present)
New Brunswick electoral district
- The riding of Fredericton North (as it exists from 2023) in relation to other New Brunswick electoral districts

Provincial electoral district
- Legislature: Legislative Assembly of New Brunswick
MLA
Luke Randall
Liberal
- District created: 2013
- First contested: 2014
- Last contested: 2024

Demographics
- Population (2011): 15,511
- Electors (2013): 11,366
- Census division: York
- Census subdivision: Fredericton

Fredericton North (1974-2006)
New Brunswick electoral district

Defunct provincial electoral district
- Legislature: Legislative Assembly of New Brunswick
- District created: 1973
- District abolished: 2006
- First contested: 1974
- Last contested: 2003

Demographics
- Electors (2003): 14,096
- Census division: York

Fredericton North (French: Fredericton-Nord) is a provincial electoral district for the Legislative Assembly of New Brunswick, Canada, from the electoral redistribution of 1973 to the electoral redistribution of 2006, and was contested again from the 2014 New Brunswick general election onward. It was split between the ridings of Fredericton-Nashwaaksis and Fredericton-Fort Nashwaak from 2006 until 2014.

From 1974 to 2003, the riding consisted of the whole of the northside of the city of Fredericton. From 2014, it contained only a subset of that former territory, namely the former towns of Devon and Nashwaaksis (excluding parts north of the Ring Road).

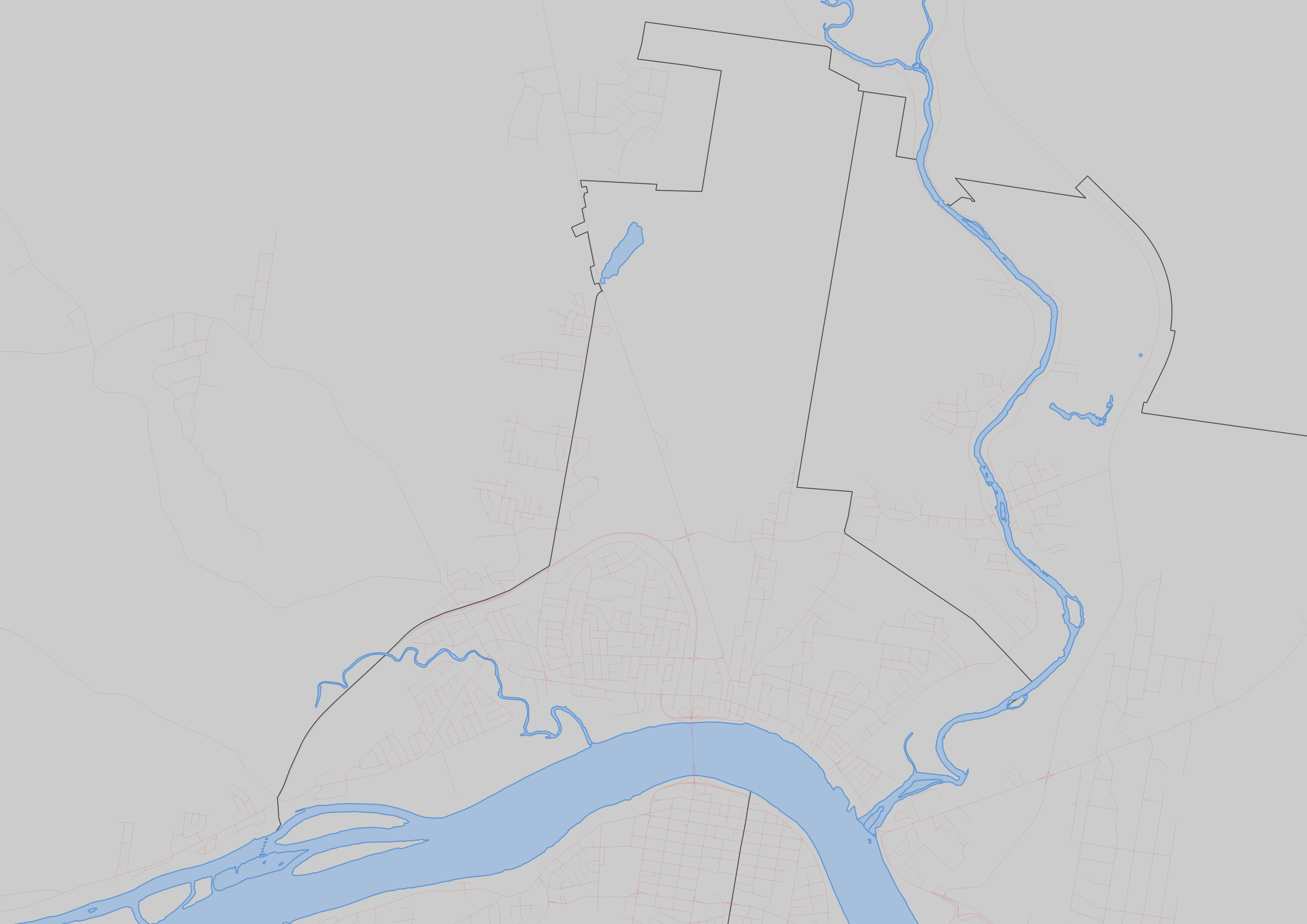
Fredericton North (as it exists from 2023) and the roads in the riding

== Members of the Legislative Assembly ==
Assembly	Years	Member	Party
Riding created from Fredericton
48th	1974–1978	Lawrence Garvie	Progressive Conservative
49th	1978–1982	Ed Allen	Progressive Conservative
50th	1982–1987	Ed Allen	Progressive Conservative
51st	1987–1991	Jim Wilson	Liberal
52nd	1991–1995	Ed Allen	Confederation of Regions
53rd	1995–1999	Jim Wilson	Liberal
54th	1999–2003	D. Peter Forbes	Progressive Conservative
55th	2003–2006	Thomas J. Burke	Liberal
Riding dissolved into Fredericton-Nashwaaksis and Fredericton-Fort Nashwaak
Riding re-created from Fredericton-Nashwaaksis and Fredericton-Fort Nashwaak
58th	2014–2018	Stephen Horsman	Liberal
59th	2018–2020	Stephen Horsman	Liberal
60th	2020–2024	Jill Green	Progressive Conservative
61st	2024–Present	Luke Randall	Liberal

== Election results ==
=== 2020–present ===
2024 New Brunswick general election
Party	Candidate	Votes	%	±%
Liberal	Luke Randall	4,130	51.13	+32.7
Progressive Conservative	Jill Green	2,753	34.08	-7.5
Green	Anthea Plummer	922	11.41	-19.8
New Democratic	Matthew Stocek	120	1.49	+0.3
People's Alliance	Glen Davis	107	1.32	-6.3
Libertarian	Andrew Vandette	46	0.57	
Total valid votes		8,078	99.80	
Total rejected ballots		16	0.20	
Turnout		8,094	64.99	
Eligible voters		12,454		
Liberal gain from Progressive Conservative		Swing		+20.1
Source: Elections New Brunswick

2020 provincial election redistributed results
Party	%
Progressive Conservative	41.6
Green	31.2
Liberal	18.4
People's Alliance	7.6
New Democratic	1.2

2020 New Brunswick general election
Party	Candidate	Votes	%	±%
Progressive Conservative	Jill Green	3,227	41.13	+12.89
Green	Luke Randall	2,464	31.40	+14.41
Liberal	Stephen Horsman	1,464	18.66	-12.95
People's Alliance	Allen Price	591	7.53	-13.83
New Democratic	Mackenzie Thomason	100	1.27	-0.52
Total valid votes		7,846	99.47	
Total rejected ballots		42	0.53	+0.33
Turnout		7,888	66.29	-0.20
Eligible voters		11,900		
Progressive Conservative gain from Liberal		Swing		+12.92

2018 New Brunswick general election
Party	Candidate	Votes	%	±%
Liberal	Stephen Horsman	2,443	31.61	-1.99
Progressive Conservative	Jill Green	2,182	28.23	-3.50
People's Alliance	Lynn King	1,651	21.36	+17.21
Green	Tamara White	1,313	16.99	+6.72
New Democratic	Scarlett Tays	139	1.80	-18.45
Total valid votes		7,728	100.0	
Total rejected ballots		16	0.21	-0.03
Turnout		7,744	66.48	+0.34
Eligible voters		11,648		
Liberal hold		Swing		+0.75

2014 New Brunswick general election
Party	Candidate	Votes	%
Liberal	Stephen Horsman	2,589	33.60
Progressive Conservative	Troy Lifford	2,445	31.73
New Democratic	Brian Duplessis	1,560	20.25
Green	Madeleine Berrevoets	791	10.27
People's Alliance	Patricia Wilkins	320	4.15
Total valid votes		7,705	100.0
Total rejected ballots		18	0.23
Turnout		7,723	66.14
Eligible voters		11,676	
Voting results declared after judicial recount.
This riding was created from parts of Fredericton-Nashwaaksis and Fredericton-Fort Nashwaak, both elected a Progressive Conservative in the previous election. Troy Lifford was the incumbent from Fredericton-Nashwaaksis.
Source: Elections New Brunswick

=== 1974–2006 ===
2003 New Brunswick general election
Party	Candidate	Votes	%	±%
Liberal	T.J. Burke	4,163	47.35	+4.59
Progressive Conservative	D. Peter Forbes	3,211	36.52	-10.67
New Democratic	Dennis Atchison	1,418	16.13	+8.82
Total valid votes		8,792	100.0	
Liberal gain from Progressive Conservative		Swing		+7.63

1999 New Brunswick general election
Party	Candidate	Votes	%	±%
Progressive Conservative	D. Peter Forbes	4,081	47.19	+26.65
Liberal	Brad Woodside	3,698	42.76	-6.17
New Democratic	Todd Joseph Tingley	632	7.31	-5.10
Confederation of Regions	Ronald Rubar	203	2.35	-15.78
Natural Law	William Parker	34	0.39	–
Total valid votes		8,648	100.0	
Progressive Conservative gain from Liberal		Swing		+16.41

1995 New Brunswick general election
Party	Candidate	Votes	%	±%
Liberal	Jim Wilson	4,235	48.93	+17.46
Progressive Conservative	Walter Brown	1,778	20.54	+5.80
Confederation of Regions	Ross Ingram	1,569	18.13	-31.16
New Democratic	Elaine Perkins	1,074	12.41	+7.91
Total valid votes		8,656	100.0	
Liberal gain from Confederation of Regions		Swing		+5.83

1991 New Brunswick general election
Party	Candidate	Votes	%	±%
Confederation of Regions	Ed Allen	6,052	49.29	–
Liberal	Jim Wilson	3,864	31.47	-26.54
Progressive Conservative	Donald H. Parent	1,810	14.74	-16.44
New Democratic	Richard Stephen DeSaulniers	553	4.50	-3.23
Total valid votes		12,279	100.0	
Confederation of Regions gain from Liberal		Swing		+37.92
Confederation of Regions candidate Ed Allen gained 18.11 percentage points from his performance in the 1987 election running as a Progressive Conservative.

1987 New Brunswick general election
Party	Candidate	Votes	%	±%
Liberal	Jim Wilson	6,667	58.01	+26.48
Progressive Conservative	Ed Allen	3,584	31.18	-28.37
New Democratic	Carman J. Burns	888	7.73	-1.19
Independent	Gordon "Brian" King	354	3.08	–
Total valid votes		11,493	100.0	
Liberal gain from Progressive Conservative		Swing		+27.42

1982 New Brunswick general election
Party	Candidate	Votes	%	±%
Progressive Conservative	Edwin G. Allen	6,392	59.55	+3.68
Liberal	Bob C. Chase	3,384	31.53	-5.63
New Democratic	Nancy MacFarland	958	8.92	+1.95
Total valid votes		10,734	100.0	
Progressive Conservative hold		Swing		+4.66

1978 New Brunswick general election
Party	Candidate	Votes	%	±%
Progressive Conservative	Edwin G. Allen	5,304	55.87	+3.22
Liberal	Carl Edward Howe	3,528	37.16	-7.58
New Democratic	Christopher Devlin Hicks	662	6.97	+4.36
Total valid votes		9,494	100.0	
Progressive Conservative hold		Swing		+5.40

1974 New Brunswick general election
Party	Candidate	Votes	%
Progressive Conservative	Lawrence Garvie	4,792	52.65
Liberal	Carl Edward Howe	4,072	44.74
New Democratic	Michel Goudreau	238	2.61
Total valid votes		9,102	100.0
The previous multi-member riding of Fredericton went totally Progressive Conservative in the last election, with Lawrence Garvie being one of two incumbents.

== See also ==
- List of New Brunswick provincial electoral districts
- Canadian provincial electoral districts
