= Claude Landry =

Canadian politician

MLA for Tracadie-Sheila
- In office 2006–2014
- Preceded by: Elvy Robichaud
- Succeeded by: Serge Rousselle

Personal details
- Born: April 29, 1955 (age 70) Tracadie, New Brunswick
- Party: Progressive Conservative

Claude Landry (born April 29, 1955) was a politician in the province of New Brunswick, Canada. He was elected to the Legislative Assembly of New Brunswick in the 2006 election as the Progressive Conservative MLA for Tracadie-Sheila. He was Deputy Speaker and named Legislative Secretary to the Minister of Education and Early Childhood Development in 2010. He was defeated by Serge Rousselle as the MLA for Tracadie-Sheila in the 2014 provincial election.

Claude Landry was born on April 29, 1955, in Tracadie, New Brunswick. His parents, Bernadette and Emile Landry, had eight children, and Claude has a twin brother, Paul. He obtained a diploma of health sciences degree from the Université de Moncton in 1976 and his Doctor of Dental Surgery from Université de Montréal in 1982. He practised as a dentist in Tracadie from 1982 to 1991 and in Neguac, New Brunswick, from 1991 to 2001. From 2001 to 2006, Landry was the executive assistant to the New Brunswick Minister of Health and Wellness, Elvy Robichaud.

Landry was a member of the Tracadie-Sheila municipal council from 1992 to 1995. He served as a member of the board of several organizations, including the Jeux de l'Acadie as chef de mission for the Grand Falls games in 1992, the Musée historique de Tracadie, the comité sauvegarde de l'hôpital de Tracadie, and as a member of the Coopérative funéraire la Colombe.
