= Stephen Horsman =

Canadian politician

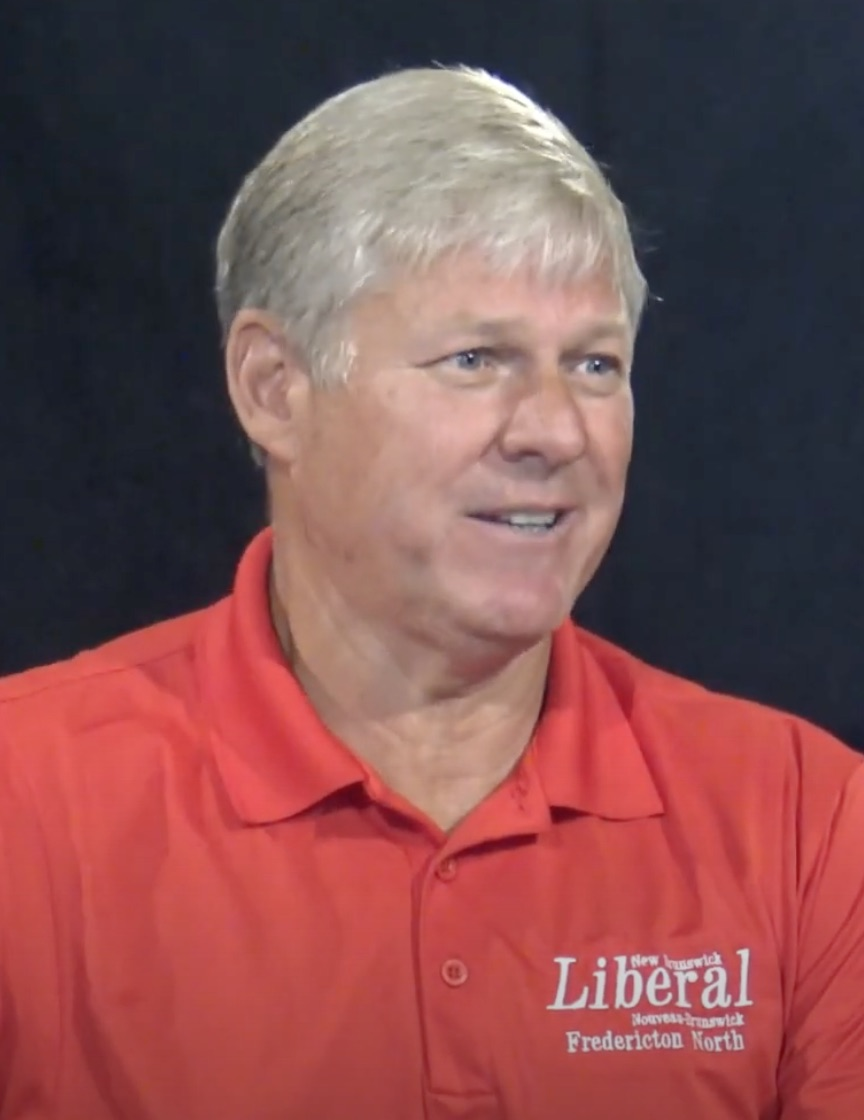

Deputy Premier of New Brunswick
- In office October 7, 2014 – November 9, 2018
- Premier: Brian Gallant
- Preceded by: Paul Robichaud
- Succeeded by: Robert Gauvin

Minister of Families and Children
- In office June 6, 2016 – November 9, 2018
- Premier: Brian Gallant
- Preceded by: Cathy Rogers
- Succeeded by: Dorothy Shephard (Social Development)

Minister of Public Safety
- In office October 7, 2014 – June 6, 2016
- Premier: Brian Gallant
- Preceded by: Bruce Northrup
- Succeeded by: Denis Landry

Minister of Justice
- In office October 7, 2014 – June 6, 2016
- Premier: Brian Gallant
- Preceded by: Troy Lifford
- Succeeded by: Denis Landry

Member of the New Brunswick Legislative Assembly for Fredericton North
- In office September 22, 2014 – August 17, 2020

Personal details
- Party: Liberal

Stephen B. Horsman is a Canadian politician, who was elected to the Legislative Assembly of New Brunswick in the 2014 provincial election. He represented the electoral district of Fredericton North as a member of the Liberal Party until his defeat in the 2020 New Brunswick general election.

When Gallant's government was formally sworn into office on October 7, 2014, Horsman was named to the Executive Council of New Brunswick as Minister of Public Safety and Justice and as deputy premier.

It was rumoured that the controversy over the government veto to the judicial appointment process was at the centre of the ministerial reshuffle of June 2016, which saw Stephen Horsman replaced by Denis Landry in the Justice portfolio. Horsman was tasked at this juncture with the families and children ministry.

== Electoral record ==
2024 New Brunswick general election: Oromocto-Sunbury
Party	Candidate	Votes	%	±%
Progressive Conservative	Mary Wilson	4,381	52.7%	-3.4
Liberal	Stephen Horsman	2,725	32.8%	+18.3
Green	Emerald Gibson	868	10.4%	-3.0
New Democratic	Glenna Hanley	341	4.1%	+2.4
Total valid votes		8,315		
Total rejected ballots				
Turnout				
Eligible voters				
Progressive Conservative hold		Swing		
Source: Elections New Brunswick
