= Tracadie-Sheila (electoral district) =

Provincial electoral district in New Brunswick, Canada

New Brunswick electoral district
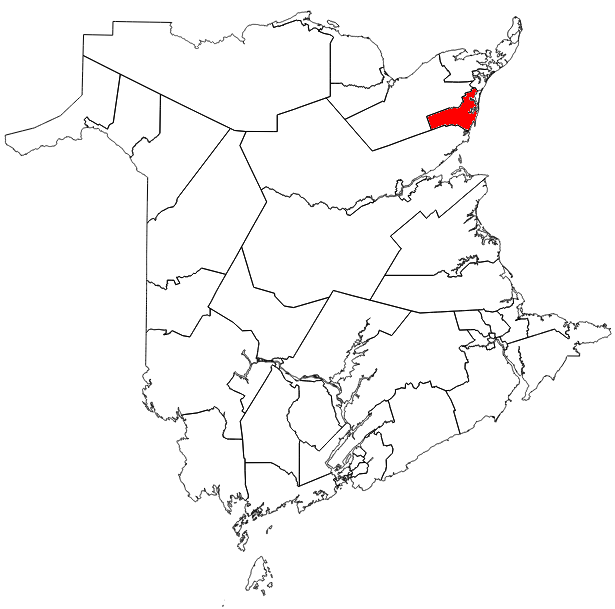
- The riding of Tracadie-Sheila (as it exists from 2014) in relation to other New Brunswick electoral districts
- Coordinates: 47.476°N 65.101°W

Defunct provincial electoral district
- Legislature: Legislative Assembly of New Brunswick
- District created: 1994
- District abolished: 2023
- First contested: 1995
- Last contested: 2020

Demographics
- Population (2011): 14,438
- Electors (2013): 11,315

Tracadie-Sheila was a provincial electoral district for the Legislative Assembly of New Brunswick, Canada. It is centred on the town of Tracadie-Sheila and is 95% French speaking.

== Members of the Legislative Assembly ==
Assembly	Years	Member	Party
Riding created from Tracadie
53rd	1995–1999	Elvy Robichaud	Progressive Conservative
54th	1999–2003	Elvy Robichaud	Progressive Conservative
55th	2003–2006	Elvy Robichaud	Progressive Conservative
56th	2006–2010	Claude Landry	Progressive Conservative
57th	2010–2014	Claude Landry	Progressive Conservative
58th	2014–2018	Serge Rousselle	Liberal
59th	2018–2020	Keith Chiasson	Liberal
60th	2020–2024	Keith Chiasson	Liberal
Riding redistributed into Tracadie and Miramichi Bay-Neguac

== Election results ==
=== 2014–present ===
2020 New Brunswick general election
Party	Candidate	Votes	%	±%
Liberal	Keith Chiasson	6,175	69.55	+20.77
Progressive Conservative	Diane Carey	2,059	23.19	-3.79
Green	Chris LeBlanc	645	7.26	+2.86
Total valid votes		8,879	100.00	
Total rejected ballots		56	0.63	-0.07
Turnout		8,935	75.28	+1.12
Eligible voters		11,869		
Liberal hold		Swing		+12.28
Source: Elections New Brunswick

2018 New Brunswick general election
Party	Candidate	Votes	%	±%
Liberal	Keith Chiasson	4,320	48.77	-15.83
Progressive Conservative	Claude Landry	2,390	26.98	+3.01
New Democratic	Francis Duguay	1,213	13.70	+4.29
Independent	Stéphane Richardson	544	6.14	
Green	Nancy Benoit	390	4.40	+3.08
Total valid votes		8,861	99.30	
Total rejected ballots		62	0.70	+0.37
Turnout		8,919	74.16	
Eligible voters		12,027		
Liberal hold		Swing		-9.42

2014 New Brunswick general election
Party	Candidate	Votes	%	±%
Liberal	Serge Rousselle	5,916	64.61	+45.65
Progressive Conservative	Claude Landry	2,195	23.97	-24.86
New Democratic	François Rousselle	861	9.40	-22.81
Green	Nancy Benoit	121	1.32	–
Independent	Donald Thomas	64	0.70	–
Total valid votes		9,157	100.0	
Total rejected ballots		30	0.33	
Turnout		9,187	76.92	
Eligible voters		11,943		
Liberal notional gain from Progressive Conservative		Swing		+35.26

=== 1995–2010 ===
2010 New Brunswick general election
Party	Candidate	Votes	%	±%
Progressive Conservative	Claude Landry	3,806	48.83	-4.55
New Democratic	Roger Duguay	2,511	32.21	–
Liberal	Norma McGraw	1,478	18.96	-24.36
Total valid votes		7,795	100.0	
Total rejected ballots		86	1.09	-0.66
Turnout		7,881	83.10	+3.78
Eligible voters		9,484		
Progressive Conservative hold		Swing		-18.38

2006 New Brunswick general election
Party	Candidate	Votes	%	±%
Progressive Conservative	Claude Landry	4,043	53.38	-2.94
Liberal	Serge Rousselle	3,281	43.32	+7.76
Independent	Stéphane Richardson	250	3.30	–
Total valid votes		7,574		
Total rejected ballots		135	1.75	-0.39
Turnout		7,709	79.32	-5.79
Eligible voters		9,718		
Progressive Conservative notional hold		Swing		-5.35
Independent candidate Stéphane Richardson earned 4.82% fewer votes than when he ran for the New Democratic Party in 2003. Changes are not based on redistributed results.

2003 New Brunswick general election
Party	Candidate	Votes	%	±%
Progressive Conservative	Elvy Robichaud	4,583	56.32	-6.62
Liberal	Weldon McLaughlin	2,894	35.56	+1.79
New Democratic	Stéphane Richardson	661	8.12	+4.83
Total valid votes		8,138		
Total rejected, unmarked and declined ballots		178	2.14	
Turnout		8,316	85.11	
Progressive Conservative hold		Swing		-4.20

1999 New Brunswick general election
Party	Candidate	Votes	%	±%
Progressive Conservative	Elvy Robichaud	5,453	62.94	+11.48
Liberal	Serge Rousselle	2,926	33.77	-12.67
New Democratic	Claudette Duguay	285	3.29	+1.19
Total valid votes		8,664		
Progressive Conservative hold		Swing		+12.08

1995 New Brunswick general election
Party	Candidate	Votes	%	±%
Progressive Conservative	Elvy Robichaud	4,214	51.46	
Liberal	George McLaughlin	3,803	46.44	
New Democratic	Aldoria Noel	172	2.10	
Total valid votes		8,189		

== See also ==
- Tracadie (electoral district)
