= D. Peter Forbes =

Canadian politician, electrical engineered, and lawyer

Donald Peter Forbes

Member of the Legislative Assembly of New Brunswick
- In office 1999–2003
- Constituency: Fredericton North

Personal details
- Born: October 3, 1940 (age 86) Edmundston, New Brunswick, Canada
- Party: Progressive Conservative Party of New Brunswick
- Education: University of New Brunswick
- Occupation: Electrical engineer, Lawyer, Politician

Donald Peter Forbes (born October 3, 1940) is an electrical engineer, lawyer and former political figure in New Brunswick, Canada. He represented Fredericton North in the Legislative Assembly of New Brunswick from 1999 to 2003 as a Progressive Conservative member.

He was born in Edmundston, New Brunswick, the son of Donald Forbes and Patricia Clarke, and was educated in Scotland, England and the University of New Brunswick, where he first studied electrical engineering and later returned for his LLB. Forbes practiced law from 1974 until 1988. He then established a company which provided computer services and another which developed geographic information systems. In 1997, he resumed the practice of law. His life partner is Deborah Johnston. Forbes ran unsuccessfully for reelection in 2003.
