= New Brunswick Liquor Corporation =

New Brunswick Liquor Corporation _{Société des alcools du Nouveau-Brunswick}
- Company type: Crown corporation
- Industry: Retail (Department & Discount)
- Founded: 1976
- Headquarters: Fredericton, New Brunswick
- Key people: Lori Stickles, President & CEO.
- Products: Liquor sales both to consumers and to businesses
- Subsidiaries: Cannabis NB
- Website: www.anbl.com

The New Brunswick Liquor Corporation (French: Société des alcools du Nouveau-Brunswick), operating as Alcool NB Liquor (ANBL), is the provincial Crown corporation of the Canadian province of New Brunswick responsible for the purchase, importation, distribution and retail activity for all alcoholic beverages in the province. It serves the public and licensees through 40 corporate retail outlets, 90 private agency store outlets, 91 local producer agency stores, and 67 grocery stores selling wine, cider and beer, as of July 2, 2023. Its subsidiary Cannabis NB is also responsible for all retail sales of recreational cannabis in the province.

Its product portfolio comprises more than 2,300 products, including wines, spirits, beers and other products, such as coolers and cider products, and locally produced alcoholic beverages.

In the last 47 years, ANBL has built a network of stores in more than 29 communities around New Brunswick, and currently employs roughly 480 people. Its Retail Operations Centre is located in Fredericton.

ANBL is directed by an eight-member Board of Directors, seven appointed by the Lieutenant Governor in Council, and the eight being the CEO. Audited net income for the 2022-2023 fiscal year was $199.8 million.

ANBL is a partner behind social responsibility programs in New Brunswick. ANBL encourages the responsible use of beverage alcohol by initiating a continued conversation around making educated decisions, responsible consumption and hosting, and ending impaired driving. ANBL sponsors select community events throughout New Brunswick through its Safe Ride Program where ANBL provides a designated driver to patrons, free of charge.

ANBL has partnered with several organizations to raise funds and bring awareness to critical community services, such as food security, in New Brunswick. Some of these organizations include Food Depot Alimentaire, United Ways of NB & Centre Bénévolat de la Péninsule Acadienne and MADD Canada.
