= Acadian Society of New Brunswick =

- Société de l'Acadie du Nouveau-Brunswick
- Current logo
- Abbreviation: SANB
- Formation: 1973; 53 years ago
- Type: Advocacy group
- Purpose: Activism
- Headquarters: Petit-Rocher, New Brunswick
- Region served: New Brunswick, Canada
- Members: 25,000+
- Official language: Acadian French
- President: Vacant
- Website: www.sanb.ca

The Acadian Society of New Brunswick (French: Société de l'Acadie du Nouveau-Brunswick) (SANB) is a French Canadian advocacy organization representing Francophones and Acadians in the province of New Brunswick.

== Description ==
The Société de l'Acadie du Nouveau-Brunswick (SANB), known in English as the Acadian Society of New Brunswick, is an organization representing Francophones and Acadians in New Brunswick, the only bilingual province in Canada and the largest Acadian population in the country. The organization, which has received federal funding, holds an annual general meeting. Presidency for SANB runs on democratic elections, and as of April 2024 there is a current election underway with three candidates.

== History ==
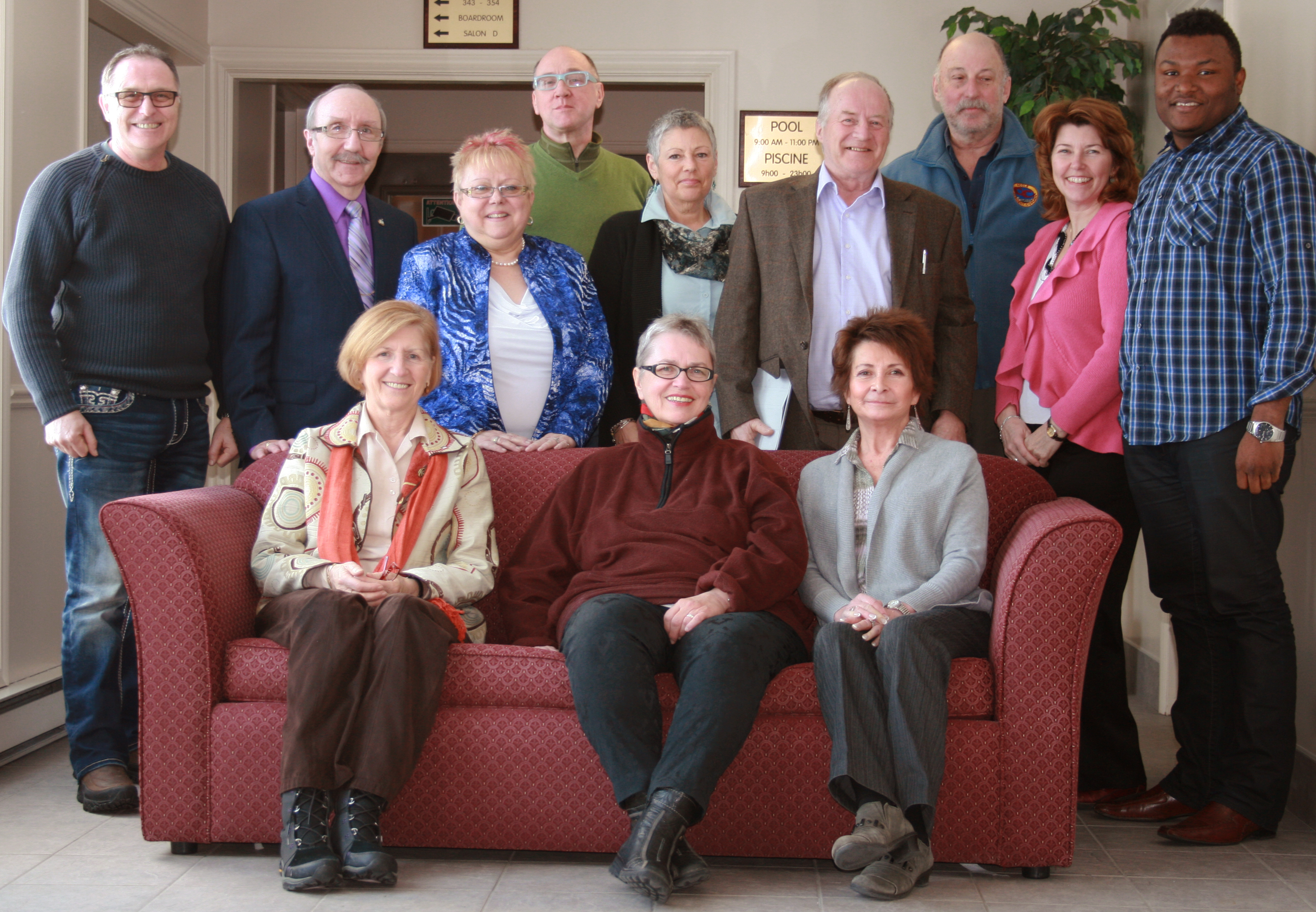
2015 SANB board of directors

In June 1973, the Société des Acadiens du Nouveau-Brunswick (SANB) was created in Shippagan, resulting from a meeting held the year prior. The following year, the organization became involved in efforts made to revive the French language in Moncton. In 1979, the organization was involved in the holding of a conference to discuss the creation of an Acadian province separated from New Brunswick, with proposals being made as early as 1976. During the 1980 Quebec referendum, SANB expressed support for voting 'yes', with president Jean-Claude Leblanc making an interpretation of the status quo being favored by those voting 'no', stating that it "leads directly, quickly and undeniably to the assimilation of francophones and their disappearance in the more-or-less long term." In 1986, SANB participated in discussions regarding compensations for the Expulsion of the Acadians.

SANB was previously based in Moncton. In 1980, the organization relocated to Petit-Rocher following a meeting held in Memramcook. In 1988, the organization was renamed to the Société des Acadiens et des Acadiennes du Nouveau-Brunswick (SAANB) and renamed again in 2008 to the Société de l'Acadie du Nouveau-Brunswick.

=== Opposition to anti-bilingualism ===
The organization has expressed a strong opposition to anti-bilingualism, with then-president Michel Doucet labelling members of the Confederation of Regions Party, a now-defunct right-wing, anti-bilingual political party, as "extremists" in 1989. In 1998, the organization sent a complaint to the New Brunswick Judicial Council regarding one of their francophone judges for remarks she made towards Acadians during a court session in Tracadie, resulting in the judge being fired the following year.

In 2002, the Government of New Brunswick's proposition of Bill 17, related to the healthcare system, led to CANB filing a civil suit against them, stating "nothing in the bill promises that all health services will be available in French." In 2022, SANB criticized the Progressive Conservative Party of New Brunswick for adding two new MLAs from the People's Alliance. The added politicians, Kris Austin and Michelle Conroy, have been described as expressing anti-bilingual opinions. Later that year, calls were made to Premier Blaine Higgs for the removal of Austin from an Official Languages Act examination group by multiple organizations including SANB. The organization also made further calls for a review to be conducted regarding the leadership of Higgs.

== Arms ==
Coat of arms of Acadian Society of New Brunswick

Crest
A halcyon wings elevated and addorsed Or perched on a nest Gules issuant from waves Argent.
Escutcheon
Tierced wavy in fess Azure Argent and Gules a turreted tower Or its portal and windows Azure.
Supporters
Two pantheons Azure unguled Argent their mullets Or each resting its interior hind leg on a carriage wheel Azure and standing on a dirt road Or.
