= Executive Council of New Brunswick =

Governmental cabinet of New Brunswick, Canada

Agency overview
- Jurisdiction: New Brunswick
- Agency executives: Louise Imbeault, Lieutenant Governor of New Brunswick; Susan Holt, Premier of New Brunswick
- Parent department: Government of New Brunswick

The Executive Council of New Brunswick (French: Conseil exécutif du Nouveau-Brunswick), informally and more commonly, the Cabinet of New Brunswick (French: Cabinet du Nouveau-Brunswick), is the Cabinet of the Canadian province of New Brunswick.

Almost always made up of members of the Legislative Assembly of New Brunswick, though not necessarily so, New Brunswick's Cabinet is similar in structure and role to the federal Cabinet of Canada, while being smaller in size. As federal and provincial responsibilities and areas of jurisdiction differ, there are a number of different portfolios between the federal and provincial governments. For example, education being a provincial domain, New Brunswick has a Minister of Education, while the federal Cabinet would not.

The Lieutenant-Governor of New Brunswick, as representative of the King in Right of New Brunswick, appoints the Premier and the Executive Council of whichever party forms government in a given legislature, which exists to advise them on the governance of the Province. The term "Lieutenant-Governor in Council" refers to the Lieutenant-Governor acting on the recommendations of Cabinet, though they have no real decision-making authority. Members of the Executive Council, called Cabinet Ministers, are appointed on the recommendation of the Premier, at whose pleasure they serve, and each oversees a certain area of the provincial government, called a "portfolio". Some Ministers head entire government departments ("Minister of ..."), while others are responsible for parts of departments or cross-government initiatives ("Minister responsible for ...").

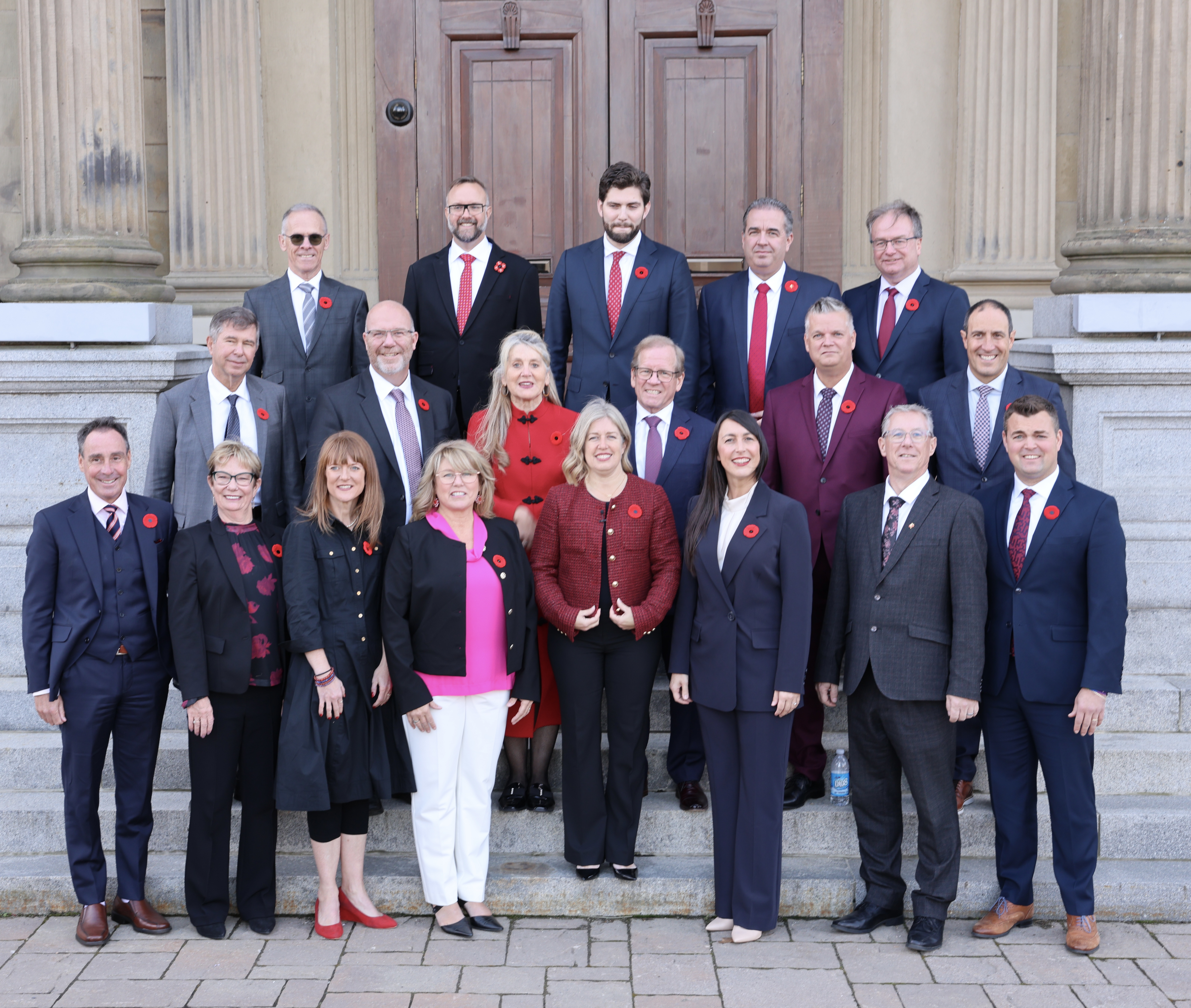
Premier Susan Holt alongside new members of the Executive Council in 2024.

The Cabinet meets on a weekly basis during the fall, winter and spring, and a monthly basis during the summer, at which Ministers and the Premier discuss policy matters and the governance of the Province. Such meetings are confidential, under the principle of "Cabinet confidentiality", and Ministers must agree to present a united front based on whichever decision is taken. Government departments will often bring proposals to Cabinet for direction or approval (for example, to draft a Bill or enter into an agreement), on which Cabinet will issue a decision and, where applicable, provide a recommendation to the Lieutenant-Governor for issuing an Order-in-Council.

There are currently two committees within the Cabinet: Policy and Priorities Board, which studies strategic and policy matters and is chaired by the Premier, and Treasury Board, which studies financial and administrative matters and is chaired by the Minister of Finance. The two committees may also hold a joint meeting. There was previously a COVID-19 Cabinet Committee, which, uniquely, included members from all parties in the New Brunswick Legislative Assembly. However, in late 2021, committee members from the Green and Liberal parties quit the committee over a controversy in which the provincial government had issued an emergency order forcing striking healthcare workers back to work.

== Current cabinet ==
The current Cabinet is led by Premier Susan Holt. The governing party is the Liberal Association.

Lieutenant governor		Since
Louise Imbeault		January 22, 2025
Minister	Portfolio	Since
Susan Holt	Premier	November 2, 2024
Susan Holt	President of the Executive Council	November 2, 2024
Susan Holt	Minister responsible for Official Languages	November 2, 2024
René Legacy	Deputy Premier	November 2, 2024
René Legacy	Minister of Finance and Treasury Board	November 2, 2024
René Legacy	Minister responsible for Energy	November 2, 2024
René Legacy	Minister responsible for the Right to Information and Protection of Privacy Act	November 2, 2024
Rob McKee	Minister of Justice	November 2, 2024
Rob McKee	Attorney General	November 2, 2024
Rob McKee	Minister responsible for Addictions and Mental Health Services	November 2, 2024
John Dornan	Minister of Health	November 2, 2024
Claire Johnson	Minister of Education and Early Childhood Development	November 2, 2024
Keith Chiasson	Minister of Indigenous Affairs	November 2, 2024
Cindy Miles	Minister of Social Development	November 2, 2024
Cindy Miles	Minister responsible for the Economic and Social Inclusion Corporation	November 2, 2024
Chuck Chiasson	Minister of Transportation and Infrastructure	November 2, 2024
Gilles LePage	Minister of Environment and Climate Change	November 2, 2024
Gilles LePage	Minister responsible for the Regional Development Corporation	November 2, 2024
Aaron Kennedy	Minister of Local Government	November 2, 2024
Aaron Kennedy	Minister responsible for Service New Brunswick	November 2, 2024
Isabelle Thériault	Minister of Tourism, Heritage and Culture	November 2, 2024
Robert Gauvin	Minister of Public Safety	November 2, 2024
Robert Gauvin	Minister responsible for la Francophonie	November 2, 2024
Alyson Townsend	Minister of Post-Secondary Education, Training and Labour	November 2, 2024
Alyson Townsend	Minister responsible for the Research and Productivity Council	November 2, 2024
Alyson Townsend	Minister responsible for the Regulatory Accountability and Reporting Act	November 2, 2024
John Herron	Minister of Natural Resources	November 2, 2024
Pat Finnigan	Minister of Agriculture, Aquaculture and Fisheries	November 2, 2024
Lyne Chantal Boudreau	Minister responsible for Seniors	November 2, 2024
Lyne Chantal Boudreau	Minister responsible for Women's Equality	November 2, 2024
Jean-Claude D'Amours	Minister of Intergovernmental Affairs	November 2, 2024
Jean-Claude D'Amours	Minister responsible for Immigration	November 2, 2024
Jean-Claude D'Amours	Minister responsible for Military Affairs	November 2, 2024
David Hickey	Minister responsible for the New Brunswick Housing Corporation	November 2, 2024
Luke Randall	Minister responsible for Opportunities NB	November 2, 2024
Luke Randall	Minister responsible for Economic Development and Small Business	November 2, 2024
Luke Randall	Minister responsible for NB Liquor and Cannabis NB	November 2, 2024
